= 1978 Romika Cup – Doubles =

Doubles
- 1978 Romika Cup

Final
- Champions: (Romania) Ion Țiriac (Argentina) Guillermo Vilas
- Runners-up: (West Germany) Jürgen Fassbender (Netherlands) Tom Okker
- Score: 3–6, 6–4, 7–6

Events
Singles	Doubles
← 1977 ·	Bavarian Tennis Championships	· 1979 →

František Pála and Balázs Taróczy were the defending champions, but lost in the first round this year.

Ion Țiriac and Guillermo Vilas won the title, defeating Jürgen Fassbender and Tom Okker 3–6, 6–4, 7–6 in the final.

== Seeds ==
1. (South Africa) Bob Hewitt / (West Germany) Karl Meiler (semifinals)
2. (West Germany) Jürgen Fassbender / (Netherlands) Tom Okker (final)
3. (France) François Jauffret / (Spain) Antonio Muñoz (quarterfinals)
4. (Romania) Ion Țiriac / (Argentina) Guillermo Vilas (champions)

== Draw ==
Key

- Q = Qualifier
- WC = Wild card
- LL = Lucky loser
- Alt = Alternate
- ITF = ITF entry
- PR = Protected ranking
- SR = Special ranking
- SE = Special exempt
- JE = Junior exempt
- JR = Junior Accelerator Programme entrant
- CO = College Accelerator Programme entrant
- NG = Next Gen Accelerator Program entrant
- w/o = Walkover
- r = Retired
- d = Defaulted

=== Draw ===
First round
1	(South Africa) B Hewitt (West Germany) K Meiler	6	6
(United States) Bill Bartlett (Australia) C Letcher	4	4
(Australia) M Edmondson (Australia) J Marks	4	3
(Egypt) I El Shafei (New Zealand) B Fairlie	6	6
(United Kingdom) J Feaver (Australia) J James	2	6	3
(Australia) B Carmichael (United Kingdom) B Mottram	6	3	6
(Austria) H Kary (New Zealand) O Parun	1	3
4	(Romania) I Țiriac (Argentina) G Vilas	6	6
3	(France) F Jauffret (Spain) A Muñoz	6	6
(Czechoslovakia) F Pála (Hungary) B Taróczy	3	1
(Argentina) R Cano (Brazil) C Kirmayr	6	6
(Socialist Federal Republic of Yugoslavia) Ž Franulović (Socialist Federal Republic of Yugoslavia) N Pilić	4	3
(Israel) S Krulevitz (South Africa) J Yuill	6	6
(Chile) P Cornejo (Chile) H Gildemeister	3	3
(West Germany) U Pinner (West Germany) R Probst	2	5
2	(West Germany) J Fassbender (Netherlands) T Okker	6	7

Quarterfinals
1	(South Africa) B Hewitt (West Germany) K Meiler	7	6
(Egypt) I El Shafei (New Zealand) B Fairlie	6	3
(Australia) B Carmichael (United Kingdom) B Mottram	1	3
4	(Romania) I Țiriac (Argentina) G Vilas	6	6
3	(France) F Jauffret (Spain) A Muñoz	6	3
(Argentina) R Cano (Brazil) C Kirmayr	7	6
(Israel) S Krulevitz (South Africa) J Yuill	4	6
2	(West Germany) J Fassbender (Netherlands) T Okker	6	7

Semifinals
1	(South Africa) B Hewitt (West Germany) K Meiler	6	6	4
4	(Romania) I Țiriac (Argentina) G Vilas	7	4	6
(Argentina) R Cano (Brazil) C Kirmayr	4	5
2	(West Germany) J Fassbender (Netherlands) T Okker	6	7

Final
4	(Romania) I Țiriac (Argentina) G Vilas	3	6	7
2	(West Germany) J Fassbender (Netherlands) T Okker	6	4	6
