= 1975 Bavarian Tennis Championships – Singles =

Singles
- 1975 BMW Open

Final
- Champion: (Argentina) Guillermo Vilas
- Runner-up: (West Germany) Karl Meiler
- Score: 2–6, 6–0, 6–2, 6–3

Details
- Draw: 32
- Seeds: 8

Events
Singles	Doubles
← 1974 ·	BMW Open	· 1976 →

Jürgen Fassbender was the defending champion, but lost in the first round this year.

Guillermo Vilas won the title, defeating Karl Meiler 2–6, 6–0, 6–2, 6–3 in the final.

== Seeds ==
1. (Argentina) Guillermo Vilas (champion)
2. (Romania) Ilie Năstase (semifinals)
3. (Czechoslovakia) Jan Kodeš (quarterfinals)
4. (West Germany) Jürgen Fassbender (first round)
5. (West Germany) Karl Meiler (final)
6. (Australia) Dick Crealy (first round)
7. (Socialist Federal Republic of Yugoslavia) Nikola Pilić (first round)
8. (West Germany) Hans-Jürgen Pohmann (quarterfinals)

== Draw ==
Key

- Q = Qualifier
- WC = Wild card
- LL = Lucky loser
- Alt = Alternate
- ITF = ITF entry
- PR = Protected ranking
- SR = Special ranking
- SE = Special exempt
- JE = Junior exempt
- JR = Junior Accelerator Programme entrant
- CO = College Accelerator Programme entrant
- NG = Next Gen Accelerator Program entrant
- w/o = Walkover
- r = Retired
- d = Defaulted

=== Finals ===
Semifinals
1	(Argentina) Guillermo Vilas	6	6	6
(West Germany) Ulrich Pinner	3	0	1
5	(West Germany) Karl Meiler	7	6	7
2	(Romania) Ilie Năstase	5	2	6

Final
1	(Argentina) Guillermo Vilas	2	6	6	6
5	(West Germany) Karl Meiler	6	0	2	3

=== Section 1 ===
First round
1	(Argentina) G Vilas	6	6
(Netherlands) R Thung	3	3
(Czechoslovakia) M Holeček	3	7	2
(Czechoslovakia) F Pála	6	5	6
(West Germany) H Elschenbroich	6	6
(Japan) J Kuki	4	2
(Colombia) I Molina	3	6	6
7	(Socialist Federal Republic of Yugoslavia) N Pilić	6	4	2
6	(Australia) D Crealy	3	6
(South Africa) J Yuill	6	7
(West Germany) U Pinner	6	6
(Colombia) J Velasco Sr.	3	3
(Czechoslovakia) P Hutka	6	5	6
(Mexico) M Lara	3	7	4
(Australia) P Kronk	6	1	7
4	(West Germany) J Fassbender	3	6	6

Second round
1	(Argentina) G Vilas	7	7
(Czechoslovakia) F Pála	6	6
(West Germany) H Elschenbroich	6	6
(Colombia) I Molina	2	1
(South Africa) J Yuill	2	4
(West Germany) U Pinner	6	6
(Czechoslovakia) P Hutka	7	6
(Australia) P Kronk	6	4

Quarterfinals
1	(Argentina) G Vilas	6	7
(West Germany) H Elschenbroich	2	5
(West Germany) U Pinner	6	6
(Czechoslovakia) P Hutka	2	4

Semifinals
1	(Argentina) G Vilas	6	6	6
(West Germany) U Pinner	3	0	1

=== Section 2 ===
First round
3	(Czechoslovakia) J Kodeš	6	5	6
(Czechoslovakia) J Písecký	3	7	3
(Austria) H Kary	3	6	6
(Australia) B Phillips-Moore	6	0	3
(United States) D Dell	6	0	7
(Poland) W Fibak	3	6	6
(United States) F McNair	7	3	1
5	(West Germany) K Meiler	5	6	6
8	(West Germany) H-J Pohmann	7	6
(Australia) S Ball	6	0
(Mexico) J Loyo-Mayo	6	6	6
(Argentina) J Ganzábal	1	7	3
(United States) S Krulevitz	6	7
(West Germany) H-J Plötz	2	6
(Paraguay) V Pecci Sr.	3	3
2	(Romania) I Năstase	6	6

Second round
3	(Czechoslovakia) J Kodeš	6	6
(Austria) H Kary	3	2
(United States) D Dell	3	6
5	(West Germany) K Meiler	6	7
8	(West Germany) H-J Pohmann	6	6
(Mexico) J Loyo-Mayo	2	0
(United States) S Krulevitz	3	4
2	(Romania) I Năstase	6	6

Quarterfinals
3	(Czechoslovakia) J Kodeš	6	4
5	(West Germany) K Meiler	7	6
8	(West Germany) H-J Pohmann	3	6
2	(Romania) I Năstase	6	7

Semifinals
5	(West Germany) K Meiler	7	6	7
2	(Romania) I Năstase	5	2	6
