= 1974 Bavarian Tennis Championships – Doubles =

Doubles
- 1974 Bavarian Tennis Championships

Final
- Champions: (Spain) Antonio Muñoz (Spain) Manuel Orantes
- Runners-up: (West Germany) Jürgen Fassbender (West Germany) Hans-Jürgen Pohmann
- Score: 2–6, 6–4, 7–6, 6–2

Events
Singles	Doubles
← 1973 ·	Bavarian Tennis Championships	· 1975 →

This was the first edition of the event.

Antonio Muñoz and Manuel Orantes won the title, defeating Jürgen Fassbender and Hans-Jürgen Pohmann 2–6, 6–4, 7–6, 6–2 in the final.

== Seeds ==
1. (Spain) Juan Gisbert Sr. / (Romania) Ilie Năstase (semifinals)
2. (West Germany) Jürgen Fassbender / (West Germany) Hans-Jürgen Pohmann (final)
3. (Italy) Paolo Bertolucci / (Italy) Adriano Panatta (semifinals)
4. (Spain) Antonio Muñoz / (Spain) Manuel Orantes (champions)

== Draw ==
Key

- Q = Qualifier
- WC = Wild card
- LL = Lucky loser
- Alt = Alternate
- ITF = ITF entry
- PR = Protected ranking
- SR = Special ranking
- SE = Special exempt
- JE = Junior exempt
- JR = Junior Accelerator Programme entrant
- CO = College Accelerator Programme entrant
- NG = Next Gen Accelerator Program entrant
- w/o = Walkover
- r = Retired
- d = Defaulted

=== Draw ===
First round
1	(Spain) J Gisbert Sr. (Romania) I Năstase	6	6
(Czechoslovakia) M Holeček	4	2
(West Germany) Atilla Korpas (West Germany) H-J Plötz	4	6	5
(France) G Goven (France) F Jauffret	6	3	7
(West Germany) K Meiler (West Germany) U Pinner	6	6	8
(Austria) H Kary (Chile) J Pinto-Bravo	3	7	10
(United States) Robert Kreiss (Romania) T Ovici	6	4
4	(Spain) A Muñoz (Spain) M Orantes	7	6
3	(Italy) P Bertolucci (Italy) A Panatta	6	6
(France) P Dominguez (Socialist Federal Republic of Yugoslavia) B Jovanović	1	3
(Italy) C Barazzutti (Socialist Federal Republic of Yugoslavia) N Špear	5	3
(Australia) D Crealy (Australia) B Phillips-Moore	7	6
(Argentina) J Ganzábal (France) P Proisy	3	6
(Israel) S Krulevitz (New Zealand) J Simpson	6	7
(West Germany) Gunther Gnettner (West Germany) W Zirngibl	0	3
2	(West Germany) J Fassbender (West Germany) H-J Pohmann	6	6

Quarterfinals
1	(Spain) J Gisbert Sr. (Romania) I Năstase	7	7
(France) G Goven (France) F Jauffret	6	6
(Austria) H Kary (Chile) J Pinto-Bravo	0	2
4	(Spain) A Muñoz (Spain) M Orantes	6	6
3	(Italy) P Bertolucci (Italy) A Panatta	3	6	6
(Australia) D Crealy (Australia) B Phillips-Moore	6	3	4
(Israel) S Krulevitz (New Zealand) J Simpson	3	1
2	(West Germany) J Fassbender (West Germany) H-J Pohmann	6	6

Semifinals
1	(Spain) J Gisbert Sr. (Romania) I Năstase	6	6
4	(Spain) A Muñoz (Spain) M Orantes	7	7
3	(Italy) P Bertolucci (Italy) A Panatta	3	2
2	(West Germany) J Fassbender (West Germany) H-J Pohmann	6	6

Final
4	(Spain) A Muñoz (Spain) M Orantes	2	6	7	6
2	(West Germany) J Fassbender (West Germany) H-J Pohmann	6	4	6	2
