= 1975 Bavarian Tennis Championships – Doubles =

Doubles
- 1975 BMW Open

Final
- Champions: (Poland) Wojtek Fibak (Czechoslovakia) Jan Kodeš
- Runners-up: (Czechoslovakia) Milan Holeček (West Germany) Karl Meiler
- Score: 7–5, 6–3

Events
Singles	Doubles
← 1974 ·	BMW Open	· 1976 →

Antonio Muñoz and Manuel Orantes were the defending champions, but did not participate this year.

Wojtek Fibak and Jan Kodeš won the title, defeating Milan Holeček and Karl Meiler 7–5, 6–3 in the final.

== Seeds ==
1. (Romania) Ilie Năstase / (Argentina) Guillermo Vilas (quarterfinals)
2. (West Germany) Jürgen Fassbender / (West Germany) Hans-Jürgen Pohmann (semifinals)
3. (Poland) Wojtek Fibak / (Czechoslovakia) Jan Kodeš (champions)
4. (Czechoslovakia) Milan Holeček / (West Germany) Karl Meiler (final)

== Draw ==
Key

- Q = Qualifier
- WC = Wild card
- LL = Lucky loser
- Alt = Alternate
- ITF = ITF entry
- PR = Protected ranking
- SR = Special ranking
- SE = Special exempt
- JE = Junior exempt
- JR = Junior Accelerator Programme entrant
- CO = College Accelerator Programme entrant
- NG = Next Gen Accelerator Program entrant
- w/o = Walkover
- r = Retired
- d = Defaulted

=== Draw ===
First round
1	(Romania) I Năstase (Argentina) G Vilas	6	7
(Australia) B Phillips-Moore (South Africa) J Yuill	2	5
(Mexico) M Lara (Mexico) J Loyo-Mayo	6	2	2
(Australia) D Crealy (Socialist Federal Republic of Yugoslavia) N Pilić	2	6	6
(Argentina) J Ganzábal (Paraguay) V Pecci	6	4	5
(West Germany) U Pinner (West Germany) H-J Plötz	1	6	7
(Australia) P Kronk (Japan) J Kuki	5	6
4	(Czechoslovakia) M Holeček (West Germany) K Meiler	7	7
3	(Poland) W Fibak (Czechoslovakia) J Kodeš	6	6
(United States) D Dell (Israel) S Krulevitz	1	4
(Czechoslovakia) P Huťka (Czechoslovakia) F Pála	6	6
(Colombia) I Molina (Colombia) J Velasco Sr.	1	4
(West Germany) H Elschenbroich (Austria) H Kary	2	6	0
(Australia) S Ball (United States) F McNair	6	1	6
(Czechoslovakia) J Písecký (Netherlands) R Thung	3	2
2	(West Germany) J Fassbender (West Germany) H-J Pohmann	6	6

Quarterfinals
1	(Romania) I Năstase (Argentina) G Vilas	6	2	6
(Australia) D Crealy (Socialist Federal Republic of Yugoslavia) N Pilić	4	6	7
(West Germany) U Pinner (West Germany) H-J Plötz	6	4
4	(Czechoslovakia) M Holeček (West Germany) K Meiler	7	6
3	(Poland) W Fibak (Czechoslovakia) J Kodeš	6	6
(Czechoslovakia) P Huťka (Czechoslovakia) F Pála	2	4
(Australia) S Ball (United States) F McNair	3	3
2	(West Germany) J Fassbender (West Germany) H-J Pohmann	6	6

Semifinals
(Australia) D Crealy (Socialist Federal Republic of Yugoslavia) N Pilić	6	6	4
4	(Czechoslovakia) M Holeček (West Germany) K Meiler	7	3	6
3	(Poland) W Fibak (Czechoslovakia) J Kodeš	6	6
2	(West Germany) J Fassbender (West Germany) H-J Pohmann	1	2

Final
4	(Czechoslovakia) M Holeček (West Germany) K Meiler	5	3
3	(Poland) W Fibak (Czechoslovakia) J Kodeš	7	6
