= 1974 Bavarian Tennis Championships – Singles =

Singles
- 1974 Bavarian Tennis Championships

Final
- Champion: (West Germany) Jürgen Fassbender
- Runner-up: (France) François Jauffret
- Score: 6–2, 5–7, 6–1, 6–4

Details
- Draw: 32
- Seeds: 8

Events
Singles	Doubles
← 1973 ·	Bavarian Tennis Championships	· 1975 →

The 1974 Bavarian Tennis Championships – Singles was an event of the 1974 Bavarian Tennis Championships men's tennis tournament and was played on outdoor clay courts at the MTTC Iphitos in Munich, West Germany between 13 May and 19 May 1974. The draw comprised 32 players and eight of them were seeded. Sandy Mayer was the defending Bavarian Tennis Championships singles champion but did not compete in this edition. Seventh-seeded Jürgen Fassbender won the title, defeating fifth-seeded François Jauffret in the final, 6–2, 5–7, 6–1, 6–4.

== Seeds ==
1. (Romania) Ilie Năstase (quarterfinals)
2. (Spain) Manuel Orantes (quarterfinals)
3. (Italy) Adriano Panatta (semifinals)
4. (Italy) Paolo Bertolucci (quarterfinals)
5. (France) François Jauffret (final)
6. (West Germany) Karl Meiler (quarterfinals)
7. (West Germany) Jürgen Fassbender (champion)
8. (West Germany) Hans-Jürgen Pohmann (second round)

== Draw ==
Key

- Q = Qualifier
- WC = Wild card
- LL = Lucky loser
- Alt = Alternate
- ITF = ITF entry
- PR = Protected ranking
- SR = Special ranking
- SE = Special exempt
- JE = Junior exempt
- JR = Junior Accelerator Programme entrant
- CO = College Accelerator Programme entrant
- NG = Next Gen Accelerator Program entrant
- w/o = Walkover
- r = Retired
- d = Defaulted

=== Finals ===
Semifinals
(Italy) Corrado Barazzutti	1	2	0
5	(France) François Jauffret	6	6	6
3	(Italy) Claudio Panatta	4	6	1	1
7	(West Germany) Jürgen Fassbender	6	3	6	6

Final
5	(France) François Jauffret	2	7	1	4
7	(West Germany) Jürgen Fassbender	6	5	6	6

=== Section 1 ===
First round
1	(Romania) I Năstase	6	7
(West Germany) A Korpás	2	5
(West Germany) H Elschenbroich	0	3
(France) P Dominguez	6	6
(France) P Proisy	3	3
(Italy) C Barazzutti	6	6
(New Zealand) J Simpson	5	6
8	(West Germany) H-J Pohmann	7	7
5	(France) F Jauffret	7	4	6
(Spain) A Muñoz	5	6	2
(Socialist Federal Republic of Yugoslavia) B Jovanović	6	6
(Spain) J Gisbert Sr.	1	4
(Australia) D Crealy	3	7	6
(United States) R Kreiss	6	6	4
(United States) S Krulevitz	6	7	5
4	(Italy) P Bertolucci	7	5	7

Second round
1	(Romania) I Năstase	6	6
(France) P Dominguez	4	4
(Italy) C Barazzutti	7	6
8	(West Germany) H-J Pohmann	5	0
5	(France) F Jauffret	6	6
(Socialist Federal Republic of Yugoslavia) B Jovanović	2	1
(Australia) D Crealy	3	7	3
4	(Italy) P Bertolucci	6	6	6

Quarterfinals
1	(Romania) I Năstase	6	6	1
(Italy) C Barazzutti	3	7	6
5	(France) F Jauffret	6	6
4	(Italy) P Bertolucci	3	2

Semifinals
(Italy) C Barazzutti	1	2	0
5	(France) F Jauffret	6	6	6

=== Section 2 ===
First round
3	(Italy) C Panatta	6	1
(Socialist Federal Republic of Yugoslavia) N Špear	0	0^{r}
(Spain) J Higueras	3	0^{r}
(Romania) T Ovici	6	2
(Czechoslovakia) M Holeček	2	4
(Austria) H Kary	6	6
(Argentina) J Ganzábal	6	4	2
6	(West Germany) K Meiler	4	6	6
7	(West Germany) J Fassbender	6	6
(Chile) J Pinto-Bravo	2	2
(France) G Goven	6	6
(Australia) B Phillips-Moore	0	4
(Italy) A Zugarelli	2	2
(West Germany) U Pinner	6	6
(West Germany) H-J Plötz	2	3
2	(Spain) M Orantes	6	6

Second round
3	(Italy) C Panatta	6	6
(Romania) T Ovici	1	1
(Austria) H Kary	6	4	0
6	(West Germany) K Meiler	3	6	6
7	(West Germany) J Fassbender	6	6
(France) G Goven	3	1
(West Germany) U Pinner	5	0
2	(Spain) M Orantes	7	6

Quarterfinals
3	(Italy) C Panatta	7	4	6
6	(West Germany) K Meiler	5	6	3
7	(West Germany) J Fassbender	6	7
2	(Spain) M Orantes	4	5

Semifinals
3	(Italy) C Panatta	4	6	1	1
7	(West Germany) J Fassbender	6	3	6	6
