= 1976 Romika Cup – Doubles =

Doubles
- 1976 Romika Cup

Final
- Champions: (Spain) Juan Gisbert Sr. (Spain) Manuel Orantes
- Runners-up: (West Germany) Jürgen Fassbender (West Germany) Hans-Jürgen Pohmann
- Score: 1–6, 6–3, 6–2, 2–3^{(r)}

Events
Singles	Doubles
← 1975 ·	Bavarian Tennis Championships	· 1977 →

Wojtek Fibak and Jan Kodeš were the defending champions, but Fibak did not participate this year. Kodeš partnered Jiří Hřebec, losing in the semifinals.

Juan Gisbert Sr. and Manuel Orantes won the title, defeating Jürgen Fassbender and Hans-Jürgen Pohmann 1–6, 6–3, 6–2, 2–3^{(r)} in the final.

== Seeds ==
1. (Spain) Juan Gisbert Sr. / (Spain) Manuel Orantes (champions)
2. (West Germany) Jürgen Fassbender / (West Germany) Hans-Jürgen Pohmann (final, retired)

== Draw ==
Key

- Q = Qualifier
- WC = Wild card
- LL = Lucky loser
- Alt = Alternate
- ITF = ITF entry
- PR = Protected ranking
- SR = Special ranking
- SE = Special exempt
- JE = Junior exempt
- JR = Junior Accelerator Programme entrant
- CO = College Accelerator Programme entrant
- NG = Next Gen Accelerator Program entrant
- w/o = Walkover
- r = Retired
- d = Defaulted

=== Draw ===
First round
1	(Spain) J Gisbert Sr. (Spain) M Orantes	6	7
(Argentina) R Cano (Colombia) I Molina	1	5
(United States) M Cahill (United States) J Whitlinger	6	7	7
(Italy) C Barazzutti (Austria) H Kary	7	6	6
(Spain) J Higueras (United States) R Reid	6	6
(France) G Goven (France) F Jauffret	7	7
(West Germany) U Pinner (West Germany) W Zirngibl	5	4
(Czechoslovakia) J Hřebec (Czechoslovakia) J Kodeš	7	6
(Australia) D Crealy (Australia) K Warwick	6	2	7
(United States) Bill Bartlett (Australia) C Letcher	2	6	5
(United States) J Austin (India) S Menon	1	6	6
(United Kingdom) J Lloyd (United Kingdom) R Taylor	6	3	3
(Sweden) B Andersson (Socialist Federal Republic of Yugoslavia) N Pilić	4	4
(Czechoslovakia) M Holeček (West Germany) H-J Plötz	6	6
(Switzerland) C Dowdeswell (Australia) P Kronk	2	3
2	(West Germany) J Fassbender (West Germany) H-J Pohmann	6	6

Quarterfinals
1	(Spain) J Gisbert Sr. (Spain) M Orantes	3	7	6
(United States) M Cahill (United States) J Whitlinger	6	5	1
(France) G Goven (France) F Jauffret	3	3
(Czechoslovakia) J Hřebec (Czechoslovakia) J Kodeš	6	6
(Australia) D Crealy (Australia) K Warwick	6	6
(United States) J Austin (India) S Menon	4	4
(Czechoslovakia) M Holeček (West Germany) H-J Plötz	4	2
2	(West Germany) J Fassbender (West Germany) H-J Pohmann	6	6

Semifinals
1	(Spain) J Gisbert Sr. (Spain) M Orantes	6	7
(Czechoslovakia) J Hřebec (Czechoslovakia) J Kodeš	4	6
(Australia) D Crealy (Australia) K Warwick	4	2
2	(West Germany) J Fassbender (West Germany) H-J Pohmann	6	6

Final
1	(Spain) J Gisbert Sr. (Spain) M Orantes	1	6	6	2
2	(West Germany) J Fassbender (West Germany) H-J Pohmann	6	3	2	3^{r}
