= 1978 Romika Cup – Singles =

Singles
- 1978 Romika Cup

Final
- Champion: (Argentina) Guillermo Vilas
- Runner-up: (United Kingdom) Buster Mottram
- Score: 6–1, 6–3, 6–3

Details
- Draw: 32
- Seeds: 8

Events
Singles	Doubles
← 1977 ·	Bavarian Tennis Championships	· 1979 →

Željko Franulović was the defending champion but lost in the semifinals to Buster Mottram.

Guillermo Vilas won in the final 6–1, 6–3, 6–3 against Mottram.

== Seeds ==
1. (Argentina) Guillermo Vilas (champion)
2. (United Kingdom) Buster Mottram (final)
3. (Hungary) Balázs Taróczy (semifinals)
4. (West Germany) Karl Meiler (quarterfinals)
5. (Chile) Hans Gildemeister (second round)
6. (Socialist Federal Republic of Yugoslavia) Željko Franulović (semifinals)
7. (United States) Pat Du Pré (first round)
8. (Czechoslovakia) Jiří Hřebec (first round)

== Draw ==
Key

- Q = Qualifier
- WC = Wild card
- LL = Lucky loser
- Alt = Alternate
- ITF = ITF entry
- PR = Protected ranking
- SR = Special ranking
- SE = Special exempt
- JE = Junior exempt
- JR = Junior Accelerator Programme entrant
- CO = College Accelerator Programme entrant
- NG = Next Gen Accelerator Program entrant
- w/o = Walkover
- r = Retired
- d = Defaulted

=== Final ===
Semifinals
1	(Argentina) Guillermo Vilas	6	6	6
3	(Hungary) Balázs Taróczy	1	7	1
6	(Socialist Federal Republic of Yugoslavia) Željko Franulović	6	4	3
2	(United Kingdom) Buster Mottram	4	6	6

Final
1	(Argentina) Guillermo Vilas	6	6	6
2	(United Kingdom) Buster Mottram	1	3	3

=== Section 1 ===
First round
1	(Argentina) G Vilas	6	6
(West Germany) G Gnettner	4	3
(West Germany) J Fassbender	7	4	6
(New Zealand) O Parun	6	6	4
(France) G Goven	7	1	4
(Czechoslovakia) V Zednik	6	6	6
(Chile) P Cornejo	3	0
5	(Chile) H Gildemeister	6	6
3	(Hungary) B Taróczy	6	3	7
(Netherlands) L Sanders	3	6	5
(Socialist Federal Republic of Yugoslavia) N Pilić	6	6	7
(New Zealand) B Fairlie	2	7	5
(South Africa) J Yuill	1	0
(West Germany) U Pinner	6	6
(Australia) J James	1	5
7	(United States) P Du Pré	6	7

Second round
1	(Argentina) G Vilas	6	6
(West Germany) J Fassbender	2	4
(Czechoslovakia) V Zednik	6	4	6
5	(Chile) H Gildemeister	3	6	4
3	(Hungary) B Taróczy	6	3	7
(Socialist Federal Republic of Yugoslavia) N Pilić	2	6	5
(West Germany) U Pinner	6	4	6
7	(United States) P Du Pré	1	6	2

Quarterfinals
1	(Argentina) G Vilas	6	7
(Czechoslovakia) V Zednik	2	5
3	(Hungary) B Taróczy	6	6
(West Germany) U Pinner	3	4

Semifinals
1	(Argentina) G Vilas	6	6	6
3	(Hungary) B Taróczy	1	7	1

=== Section 2 ===
First round
6	(Socialist Federal Republic of Yugoslavia) Ž Franulović	7	6
(Netherlands) T Okker	5	1
Q	(United Kingdom) J Feaver	6	7
(Egypt) I El Shafei	3	6
(France) J-F Caujolle	3	2
(Austria) P Feigl	6	6
(South Africa) B Hewitt	6	5
4	(West Germany) K Meiler	7	6
8	(Czechoslovakia) J Hřebec	3	2
(France) F Jauffret	6	6
Q	(Brazil) C Kirmayr	6	6
Q	(West Germany) M Wünschig	3	2
Q	(Argentina) R Cano	6	6
(Austria) H Kary	2	2
(West Germany) W Zerngibl	4	5
2	(United Kingdom) B Mottram	6	7

Second round
6	(Socialist Federal Republic of Yugoslavia) Ž Franulović	6	6	6
Q	(United Kingdom) J Feaver	7	0	1
(Austria) P Feigl	2	2
4	(West Germany) K Meiler	6	6
(France) F Jauffret	4	7	4
Q	(Brazil) C Kirmayr	6	6	6
Q	(Argentina) R Cano	6	2	1
2	(United Kingdom) B Mottram	2	6	6

Quarterfinals
6	(Socialist Federal Republic of Yugoslavia) Ž Franulović	6	6
4	(West Germany) K Meiler	1	2
Q	(Brazil) C Kirmayr	6	4	3
2	(United Kingdom) B Mottram	4	6	6

Semifinals
6	(Socialist Federal Republic of Yugoslavia) Ž Franulović	6	4	3
2	(United Kingdom) B Mottram	4	6	6
