= 1977 Romika Cup – Doubles =

Doubles
- 1977 Romika Cup

Final
- Champions: (Czechoslovakia) František Pala (Hungary) Balázs Taróczy
- Runners-up: (Socialist Federal Republic of Yugoslavia) Nikola Špear (United States) John Whitlinger
- Score: 6–3, 6–4

Events
Singles	Doubles
← 1976 ·	Bavarian Tennis Championships	· 1978 →

Juan Gisbert Sr. and Manuel Orantes were the defending champions, but did not participate this year.

František Pala and Balázs Taróczy won the title, defeating Nikola Špear and John Whitlinger 6–3, 6–4 in the final.

== Seeds ==
1. (West Germany) Jürgen Fassbender / (West Germany) Karl Meiler (first round)
2. (Australia) Bob Carmichael / (Australia) Dick Crealy (first round)

== Draw ==
Key

- Q = Qualifier
- WC = Wild card
- LL = Lucky loser
- Alt = Alternate
- ITF = ITF entry
- PR = Protected ranking
- SR = Special ranking
- SE = Special exempt
- JE = Junior exempt
- JR = Junior Accelerator Programme entrant
- CO = College Accelerator Programme entrant
- NG = Next Gen Accelerator Program entrant
- w/o = Walkover
- r = Retired
- d = Defaulted

=== Draw ===
First round
1	(West Germany) J Fassbender (West Germany) K Meiler	3	6
(Socialist Federal Republic of Yugoslavia) Ž Franulović (Socialist Federal Republic of Yugoslavia) N Pilić	6	7
(France) P Dominguez (France) F Jauffret	6	7
(Czechoslovakia) J Hřebec (Austria) H Kary	2	6
(Socialist Federal Republic of Yugoslavia) N Špear (United States) J Whitlinger	6	5	7
(France) J-F Caujolle (Spain) J Higueras	1	7	5
(West Germany) F Gebert (West Germany) W Zirngibl	2	6
(Paraguay) V Pecci (Chile) B Prajoux	6	7
(Australia) C Letcher (Czechoslovakia) V Zedník	4	6
(United States) P Du Pré (India) S Menon	6	7
(West Germany) K Eberhard (West Germany) U Pinner	6	3	2
(United Kingdom) R Lewis (United Kingdom) R Taylor	3	6	6
(Bolivia) R Benavides (Colombia) I Molina	3	0
(Czechoslovakia) F Pala (Hungary) B Taróczy	6	6
(Switzerland) C Dowdeswell (South Africa) D Schneider	7	6
2	(Australia) B Carmichael (Australia) D Crealy	6	4

Quarterfinals
(Socialist Federal Republic of Yugoslavia) Ž Franulović (Socialist Federal Republic of Yugoslavia) N Pilić	6	6	7
(France) P Dominguez (France) F Jauffret	7	2	6
(Socialist Federal Republic of Yugoslavia) N Špear (United States) J Whitlinger	7	3	7
(Paraguay) V Pecci (Chile) B Prajoux	6	6	5
(United States) P Du Pré (India) S Menon	6	6
(United Kingdom) R Lewis (United Kingdom) R Taylor	4	4
(Czechoslovakia) F Pala (Hungary) B Taróczy	6	6
(Switzerland) C Dowdeswell (South Africa) D Schneider	3	2

Semifinals
(Socialist Federal Republic of Yugoslavia) Ž Franulović (Socialist Federal Republic of Yugoslavia) N Pilić	6	3	4
(Socialist Federal Republic of Yugoslavia) N Špear (United States) J Whitlinger	3	6	6
(United States) P Du Pré (India) S Menon	6	3	4
(Czechoslovakia) F Pala (Hungary) B Taróczy	4	6	6

Final
(Socialist Federal Republic of Yugoslavia) N Špear (United States) J Whitlinger	3	4
(Czechoslovakia) F Pala (Hungary) B Taróczy	6	6
