= 1977 Romika Cup – Singles =

Singles
- 1977 Romika Cup

Final
- Champion: (Socialist Federal Republic of Yugoslavia) Željko Franulović
- Runner-up: (Paraguay) Victor Pecci Sr.
- Score: 6–1, 6–1, 6–7, 7–5

Details
- Draw: 32
- Seeds: 2

Events
Singles	Doubles
← 1976 ·	Bavarian Tennis Championships	· 1978 →

Manuel Orantes was the defending champion, but did not participate this year.

Željko Franulović won the title, defeating Victor Pecci Sr. 6–1, 6–1, 6–7, 7–5 in the final.

== Seeds ==
1. (France) Jean-Louis Haillet (first round)
2. (Italy) Corrado Barazzutti (first round)

== Draw ==
Key

- Q = Qualifier
- WC = Wild card
- LL = Lucky loser
- Alt = Alternate
- ITF = ITF entry
- PR = Protected ranking
- SR = Special ranking
- SE = Special exempt
- JE = Junior exempt
- JR = Junior Accelerator Programme entrant
- CO = College Accelerator Programme entrant
- NG = Next Gen Accelerator Program entrant
- w/o = Walkover
- r = Retired
- d = Defaulted

=== Final ===
Semifinals
(Spain) José Higueras	4	4
(Socialist Federal Republic of Yugoslavia) Željko Franulović	6	6
(Australia) Dick Crealy	2	0
(Paraguay) Victor Pecci Sr.	6	6

Final
(Socialist Federal Republic of Yugoslavia) Željko Franulović	6	6	6	7
(Paraguay) Victor Pecci Sr.	1	1	7	5

=== Section 1 ===
First round
1	(France) J-L Haillet	6	4
(Switzerland) C Dowdeswell	7	6
(Spain) J Higueras	7	4	6
(France) J-F Caujolle	5	6	1
(West Germany) R Gehring	3	3
(France) P Proisy	6	6
(India) S Menon	6	1	6
(West Germany) U Pinner	3	6	1
(Hungary) B Taróczy	6	6
(West Germany) G Gnettner	2	4
(Chile) H Gildemeister	7	1	7
(Chile) B Prajoux	6	6	5
(Socialist Federal Republic of Yugoslavia) Ž Franulović	7	6
(United Kingdom) R Lewis	5	0
(West Germany) F Gebert	3	6	6
(France) F Jauffret	6	2	3

Second round
(Switzerland) C Dowdeswell	0	5
(Spain) J Higueras	6	7
(France) P Proisy	6	6
(India) S Menon	2	4
(Hungary) B Taróczy	0	6	1
(Chile) H Gildemeister	6	1	6
(Socialist Federal Republic of Yugoslavia) Ž Franulović	6	3	6
(West Germany) F Gebert	3	6	3

Quarterfinals
(Spain) J Higueras	6	6
(France) P Proisy	4	3
(Chile) H Gildemeister	4	0
(Socialist Federal Republic of Yugoslavia) Ž Franulović	6	6

Semifinals
(Spain) J Higueras	4	4
(Socialist Federal Republic of Yugoslavia) Ž Franulović	6	6

=== Section 2 ===
First round
(Australia) D Crealy	4	6	7
(West Germany) J Fassbender	6	3	5
(Australia) C Letcher	4	1
(West Germany) K Meiler	6	6
(United Kingdom) R Taylor	6	4
(Czechoslovakia) F Pala	7	6
(Colombia) I Molina	6	7
(Italy) P Bertolucci	3	5
(Paraguay) V Pecci Sr.	6	6
(West Germany) W Zirngibl	4	3
(West Germany) P Elter	6	6
(Czechoslovakia) J Hřebec	0	0
(Czechoslovakia) V Zedník	2	6	4
(Austria) H Kary	6	4	6
(Socialist Federal Republic of Yugoslavia) N Pilić	6	6
2	(Italy) C Barazzutti	4	0

Second round
(Australia) D Crealy	6	6
(West Germany) K Meiler	1	3
(Czechoslovakia) F Pala	3	3
(Colombia) I Molina	6	6
(Paraguay) V Pecci Sr.	6	6
(West Germany) P Elter	3	3
(Austria) H Kary	5	2
(Socialist Federal Republic of Yugoslavia) N Pilić	7	6

Quarterfinals
(Australia) D Crealy	6	6
(Colombia) I Molina	3	1
(Paraguay) V Pecci Sr.	6	7
(Socialist Federal Republic of Yugoslavia) N Pilić	3	5

Semifinals
(Australia) D Crealy	2	0
(Paraguay) V Pecci Sr.	6	6
