= 1974 Bavarian Tennis Championships =

- Date: 13–19 May
- Edition: 58th
- Category: Grand Prix (Group C)
- Draw: 32S / 16D
- Prize money: $25,000
- Surface: Clay / outdoor
- Location: Munich, West Germany
- Venue: MTTC Iphitos

Champions

Singles
- (West Germany) Jürgen Fassbender

Doubles
- (Spain) Antonio Muñoz / (Spain) Manuel Orantes
← 1973 ·	Bavarian Tennis Championships	· 1975 →

The 1974 Bavarian Tennis Championships was a men's Grand Prix tennis circuit tournament held at the MTTC Iphitos in Munich, West Germany which was played on outdoor clay courts. It was the 58th edition of the tournament and was held from 13 May through 19 May 1974. Seventh-seeded Jürgen Fassbender won the singles title.

== Finals ==
=== Singles ===
(West Germany) Jürgen Fassbender defeated (France) François Jauffret 6–2, 5–7, 6–1, 6–4

- It was Fassbender's only singles title of the year and the 2nd of his career.

=== Doubles ===
(Spain) Antonio Muñoz / (Spain) Manuel Orantes defeated (West Germany) Jürgen Fassbender / (West Germany) Hans-Jürgen Pohmann 2–6, 6–4, 7–6, 6–2

- It was Muñoz's 2nd title of the year and the 2nd of his career. It was Orantes's 2nd title of the year and the 22nd of his career.
