= 1976 Romika Cup – Singles =

Singles
- 1976 Romika Cup

Final
- Champion: (Spain) Manuel Orantes
- Runner-up: (West Germany) Karl Meiler
- Score: 6–1, 6–4, 6–1

Details
- Draw: 32
- Seeds: 8

Events
Singles	Doubles
← 1975 ·	Bavarian Tennis Championships	· 1977 →

Guillermo Vilas was the defending champion, but did not participate this year.

Manuel Orantes won the title, defeating Karl Meiler 6–1, 6–4, 6–1 in the final.

== Draw ==
Key

- Q = Qualifier
- WC = Wild card
- LL = Lucky loser
- Alt = Alternate
- ITF = ITF entry
- PR = Protected ranking
- SR = Special ranking
- SE = Special exempt
- JE = Junior exempt
- JR = Junior Accelerator Programme entrant
- CO = College Accelerator Programme entrant
- NG = Next Gen Accelerator Program entrant
- w/o = Walkover
- r = Retired
- d = Defaulted

=== Finals ===
Semifinals
(Spain) Manuel Orantes	6	6
(Austria) Hans Kary	1	4
(West Germany) Karl Meiler	5	6	6
(Czechoslovakia) Jan Kodeš	7	4	4

Final
(Spain) Manuel Orantes	6	6	6
(West Germany) Karl Meiler	1	4	1

=== Section 1 ===
First round
(Spain) M Orantes	6	6
(Australia) C Letcher	0	4
(West Germany) U Pinner	6	6
(France) G Goven	2	2
(West Germany) H-J Plötz	3	6	6
(West Germany) W Zirngibl	6	2	4
(Socialist Federal Republic of Yugoslavia) N Pilić	6	3
(France) F Jauffret	7	6
(Argentina) R Cano	4	6	6
(Socialist Federal Republic of Yugoslavia) Z Franulović	6	1	2
(West Germany) J Fassbender	5	7	1
(United States) M Cahill	7	6	6
(Sweden) B Andersson	6	6
(Rhodesia) C Dowdeswell	3	2
(Austria) H Kary	6	4	6
(Italy) C Barazzutti	3	6	4

Second round
(Spain) M Orantes	1	6	6
(West Germany) U Pinner	6	2	1
(West Germany) H-J Plötz	3	4
(France) F Jauffret	6	6
(Argentina) R Cano	2	3
(United States) M Cahill	6	6
(Sweden) B Andersson	6	0
(Austria) H Kary	7	6

Quarterfinals
(Spain) M Orantes	6	6
(France) F Jauffret	2	0
(United States) M Cahill	2	7	1
(Austria) H Kary	6	6	6

Semifinals
(Spain) M Orantes	6	6
(Austria) H Kary	1	4

=== Section 2 ===
First round
(West Germany) K Meiler	6	6
(United Kingdom) J Lloyd	4	1
(Colombia) I Molina	3	4
(Spain) M Santana	6	6
(United Kingdom) R Taylor	7	6
(West Germany) K Eberhard	5	4
(Czechoslovakia) J Hřebec	6	3	6
(Spain) J Higueras	2	6	3
(Spain) J Gisbert Sr.	6	6
(Australia) K Warwick	1	3
(Australia) P Kronk	6	5	1
(West Germany) H-J Pohmann	4	7	6
(Czechoslovakia) V Zednik	3	4
(Australia) D Crealy	6	6
(West Germany) F Gebert	4	2
(Czechoslovakia) J Kodeš	6	6

Second round
(West Germany) K Meiler	6	6
(Spain) M Santana	1	3
(United Kingdom) R Taylor	3	4
(Czechoslovakia) J Hřebec	6	6
(Spain) J Gisbert Sr.	1	6	6
(West Germany) H-J Pohmann	6	3	4
(Australia) D Crealy	2	6	3
(Czechoslovakia) J Kodeš	6	1	6

Quarterfinals
(West Germany) K Meiler	7	6
(Czechoslovakia) J Hřebec	5	4
(Spain) J Gisbert Sr.	3	3
(Czechoslovakia) J Kodeš	6	6

Semifinals
(West Germany) K Meiler	5	6	6
(Czechoslovakia) J Kodeš	7	4	4
