= 1979 Romika Cup – Singles =

Singles
- 1979 Romika Cup

Final
- Champion: (Spain) Manuel Orantes
- Runner-up: (Poland) Wojtek Fibak
- Score: 6–3, 6–2, 6–4

Details
- Draw: 32
- Seeds: 8

Events
Singles	Doubles
← 1978 ·	Bavarian Tennis Championships	· 1980 →

Guillermo Vilas was the defending champion, but did not participate this year.

Manuel Orantes won the title, defeating Wojtek Fibak 6–3, 6–2, 6–4 in the final.

== Seeds ==
1. (Spain) Manuel Orantes (champion)
2. (Poland) Wojtek Fibak (final)
3. (Hungary) Balázs Taróczy (second round)
4. (Paraguay) Víctor Pecci, Sr. (second round)
5. (Netherlands) Tom Okker (second round)
6. (West Germany) Ulrich Pinner (second round)
7. (West Germany) Rolf Gehring (second round)
8. (Socialist Federal Republic of Yugoslavia) Željko Franulović (second round)

== Draw ==
Key

- Q = Qualifier
- WC = Wild card
- LL = Lucky loser
- Alt = Alternate
- ITF = ITF entry
- PR = Protected ranking
- SR = Special ranking
- SE = Special exempt
- JE = Junior exempt
- JR = Junior Accelerator Programme entrant
- CO = College Accelerator Programme entrant
- NG = Next Gen Accelerator Program entrant
- w/o = Walkover
- r = Retired
- d = Defaulted

=== Final ===
Semifinals
1	(Spain) Manuel Orantes	6	6
(Czechoslovakia) Jiří Hřebec	4	2
Q	(Ecuador) Andrés Gómez	4	1
2	(Poland) Wojciech Fibak	6	6

Final
1	(Spain) Manuel Orantes	6	6	6
2	(Poland) Wojtek Fibak	3	2	4

=== Section 1 ===
First round
1	(Spain) M Orantes	6	6
(Australia) R Case	0	1
(New Zealand) R Simpson	6	6
(West Germany) G Gnettner	0	3
(Czechoslovakia) P Hutka	6	5
(West Germany) W Zirngibl	7	7
(Australia) D Carter	2	3
6	(West Germany) U Pinner	6	6
3	(Hungary) B Taróczy	6	6
(West Germany) K Eberhard	2	4
(West Germany) K Meiler	4	5
(Colombia) I Molina	6	7
(Czechoslovakia) J Hřebec	6	6
(Venezuela) J Andrew	2	3
(France) P Dominguez	3	6	5
8	(Socialist Federal Republic of Yugoslavia) Ž Franulović	6	3	7

Second round
1	(Spain) M Orantes	2	6	6
(New Zealand) R Simpson	6	4	3
(West Germany) W Zirngibl	7	6
6	(West Germany) U Pinner	5	1
3	(Hungary) B Taróczy	2	6	6
(Colombia) I Molina	6	0	7
(Czechoslovakia) J Hřebec	6	6
8	(Socialist Federal Republic of Yugoslavia) Ž Franulović	4	4

Quarterfinals
1	(Spain) M Orantes	6	3	6
(West Germany) W Zirngibl	1	6	4
(Colombia) I Molina	6	5	2
(Czechoslovakia) J Hřebec	1	7	6

Semifinals
1	(Spain) M Orantes	6	6
(Czechoslovakia) J Hřebec	4	2

=== Section 2 ===
First round
7	(West Germany) R Gehring	7	6
(South Africa) R Moore	6	1
(Australia) J James	6	1
Q	(Ecuador) A Gómez	7	6
(Czechoslovakia) J Kodeš	6	7
(Brazil) J Soares	3	5
Q	(Czechoslovakia) S Birner	2	4
4	(Paraguay) V Pecci	6	6
5	(Netherlands) T Okker	4	6	6
Q	(Spain) A Muñoz	6	3	1
(West Germany) P Elter	6	6	6
(Sweden) K Johansson	7	2	1
(United States) R Fagel	6	6
Q	(France) C Roger-Vasselin	2	1
(France) J-L Haillet	3	4
2	(Poland) W Fibak	6	6

Second round
7	(West Germany) R Gehring	6	4
Q	(Ecuador) A Gómez	7	6
(Czechoslovakia) J Kodeš	4	6	7
4	(Paraguay) V Pecci	6	4	6
5	(Netherlands) T Okker	6	5
(West Germany) P Elter	7	7
(United States) R Fagel	4	6	3
2	(Poland) W Fibak	6	3	6

Quarterfinals
Q	(Ecuador) A Gómez	4	7	6
(Czechoslovakia) J Kodeš	6	6	4
(West Germany) P Elter	2	3
2	(Poland) W Fibak	6	6

Semifinals
Q	(Ecuador) A Gómez	4	1
2	(Poland) W Fibak	6	6
