= 1976 Romika Cup =

- Date: 4–9 May
- Edition: 60th
- Category: Grand Prix (Two Star)
- Draw: 32S / 16D
- Prize money: $50,000
- Surface: Clay / outdoor
- Location: Munich, West Germany
- Venue: MTTC Iphitos

Champions

Singles
- (Spain) Manuel Orantes

Doubles
- (Spain) Juan Gisbert Sr. / (Spain) Manuel Orantes
- Bavarian International Tennis Championships

The 1976 Romika Cup, also known by as the Bavarian Tennis Championships, was a men's tennis tournament that was part of the Two Star category of the 1976 Grand Prix tennis circuit. The tournament was held at the MTTC Iphitos in Munich, West Germany and ran from 4 May through 9 May 1976. Manuel Orantes won the singles title.

== Finals ==
=== Singles ===
(Spain) Manuel Orantes defeated (West Germany) Karl Meiler 6–1, 6–4, 6–1

- It was Orantes's 4th title of the year and the 42nd of his career.

=== Doubles ===
(Spain) Juan Gisbert Sr. / (Spain) Manuel Orantes defeated (West Germany) Jürgen Fassbender / (West Germany) Hans-Jürgen Pohmann 1–6, 6–3, 6–2, 2–3 (Meiler and Pohmann retired)

- It was Gisbert Sr.'s 1st title of the year and the 1st of his career. It was Orantes's 3rd title of the year and the 41st of his career.
