= 1978 Romika Cup =

- Date: 23–28 May
- Edition: 62nd
- Draw: 32S / 16D
- Prize money: $75,000
- Surface: Clay / outdoor
- Location: Munich, West Germany
- Venue: MTTC Iphitos

Champions

Singles
- (Argentina) Guillermo Vilas

Doubles
- (Romania) Ion Țiriac / (Argentina) Guillermo Vilas
- Bavarian Tennis Championships

The 1978 Romika Cup was a men's Grand Prix Tennis Circuit tournament held in Munich, West Germany. It was the 62nd edition of the tournament and was held from 23 May through 28 May 1978. It is now part of the ATP Tour. First-seeded Guillermo Vilas won the singles title, his second after 1975.

== Finals ==
=== Singles ===
(Argentina) Guillermo Vilas defeated (United Kingdom) Buster Mottram 6–1, 6–3, 6–3

- It was Vilas's 2nd singles title of the year and the 37th of his career.

=== Doubles ===
(Romania) Ion Țiriac / (Argentina) Guillermo Vilas defeated (West Germany) Jürgen Fassbender / (Netherlands) Tom Okker 3–6, 6–4, 7–6

- It was Tiriac's 1st title of the year and the 19th of his career. It was Vilas's 2nd title of the year and the 49th of his career.
