= 1979 Romika Cup – Doubles =

Doubles
- 1979 Romika Cup

Final
- Champions: (Poland) Wojtek Fibak (Netherlands) Tom Okker
- Runners-up: (West Germany) Jürgen Fassbender (France) Jean-Louis Haillet
- Score: 7–6, 7–5

Details
- Draw: 16
- Seeds: 4

Events
Singles	Doubles
- Bavarian Tennis Championships

Ion Țiriac and Guillermo Vilas were the defending champions, but did not participate this year.

Wojtek Fibak and Tom Okker won the title, defeating Jürgen Fassbender and Jean-Louis Haillet 7–6, 7–5 in the final.

== Seeds ==
1. (Poland) Wojtek Fibak / (Netherlands) Tom Okker (champions)
2. (Paraguay) Víctor Pecci / (Hungary) Balázs Taróczy (first round)
3. (Australia) Ross Case / (Czechoslovakia) Jan Kodeš (first round)
4. (West Germany) Jürgen Fassbender / (France) Jean-Louis Haillet (final)

== Draw ==
Key

- Q = Qualifier
- WC = Wild card
- LL = Lucky loser
- Alt = Alternate
- ITF = ITF entry
- PR = Protected ranking
- SR = Special ranking
- SE = Special exempt
- JE = Junior exempt
- JR = Junior Accelerator Programme entrant
- CO = College Accelerator Programme entrant
- NG = Next Gen Accelerator Program entrant
- w/o = Walkover
- r = Retired
- d = Defaulted

=== Draw ===
First round
1	(Poland) W Fibak (Netherlands) T Okker	7	6
(Australia) P Kronk (Australia) C Letcher	6	2
(Socialist Federal Republic of Yugoslavia) Ž Franulović (France) C Roger-Vasselin	7	6
(South Africa) R Moore (New Zealand) R Simpson	5	3
3	(Australia) R Case (Czechoslovakia) J Kodeš	6	3	4
(United States) B Martin (Colombia) I Molina	2	6	6
(Australia) D Carter (Australia) J James	6	4	3
(Venezuela) J Andrew (Brazil) J Soares	3	6	6
(West Germany) K Eberhard (West Germany) K Meiler	3	6	6
(West Germany) P Elter (West Germany) R Probst	6	4	3
(France) P Dominguez (France) G Moretton	3	6	6
4	(West Germany) J Fassbender (France) J-L Haillet	6	4	7
(West Germany) R Gehring (Czechoslovakia) P Složil	6	2	7
(West Germany) A Maurer (West Germany) Manuel Maurer	4	6	6
(Czechoslovakia) J Hřebec (Czechoslovakia) P Huťka	7	3	6
2	(Paraguay) V Pecci (Hungary) B Taróczy	6	6	3

Quarterfinals
1	(Poland) W Fibak (Netherlands) T Okker	DEF
(Socialist Federal Republic of Yugoslavia) Ž Franulović (France) C Roger-Vasselin
(United States) B Martin (Colombia) I Molina	7	6
(Venezuela) J Andrew (Brazil) J Soares	5	2
(West Germany) K Eberhard (West Germany) K Meiler	6	3	2
4	(West Germany) J Fassbender (France) J-L Haillet	3	6	6
(West Germany) R Gehring (Czechoslovakia) P Složil	1	4
(Czechoslovakia) J Hřebec (Czechoslovakia) P Huťka	6	6

Semifinals
1	(Poland) W Fibak (Netherlands) T Okker	6	7
(United States) B Martin (Colombia) I Molina	4	6
4	(West Germany) J Fassbender (France) J-L Haillet	7	3	7
(Czechoslovakia) J Hřebec (Czechoslovakia) P Huťka	5	6	6

Final
1	(Poland) W Fibak (Netherlands) T Okker	7	7
4	(West Germany) J Fassbender (France) J-L Haillet	6	5
