= 1979 Romika Cup =

- Date: 22–27 May
- Edition: 63rd
- Draw: 32S / 16D
- Prize money: $75,000
- Surface: Clay / outdoor
- Location: Munich, West Germany
- Venue: MTTC Iphitos

Champions

Singles
- (Spain) Manuel Orantes

Doubles
- (Poland) Wojtek Fibak / (Netherlands) Tom Okker
- Bavarian Tennis Championships

The 1979 Romika Cup was a men's Grand Prix Tennis Circuit tennis tournament held at the MTTC Iphitos in Munich, West Germany. It was the 63rd edition of the tournament which was held from 22 May through 27 May 1979. First-seeded Manuel Orantes won the singles title, his second at the event after 1976.

== Finals ==
=== Singles ===
(Spain) Manuel Orantes defeated (Poland) Wojciech Fibak 6–3, 6–2, 6–4

- It was Orantes's only title of the year and the 52nd of his career.

=== Doubles ===
(Poland) Wojciech Fibak / (Netherlands) Tom Okker defeated (West Germany) Jürgen Fassbender / (France) Jean-Louis Haillet 7–6, 7–5

- It was Fibak's 6th title of the year and the 44th of his career. It was Okker's 4th title of the year and the 85th of his career.
