= 1977 Romika Cup =

- Date: 26 April – 1 May
- Edition: 61st
- Category: Grand Prix (Two Star)
- Draw: 32S / 16D
- Prize money: $75,000
- Surface: Clay / outdoor
- Location: Munich, West Germany
- Venue: MTTC Iphitos

Champions

Singles
- (Socialist Federal Republic of Yugoslavia) Željko Franulović

Doubles
- (Czechoslovakia) František Pala / (Hungary) Balázs Taróczy
- Bavarian Tennis Championships

The 1977 Romika Cup was a men's tennis tournament played on outdoor clay courts at the MTTC Iphitos in Munich, West Germany. It was part of the 1977 Grand Prix tennis circuit and categorized as a Two Star event. The tournament was held from 26 April through 1 May 1977. Željko Franulović won the singles title.

== Finals ==
=== Singles ===
(Socialist Federal Republic of Yugoslavia) Željko Franulović defeated (Paraguay) Víctor Pecci Sr. 6–1, 6–1, 6–7, 7–5

- It was Franulović's only title of the year and the 13th of his career.

=== Doubles ===
(Czechoslovakia) František Pala / (Hungary) Balázs Taróczy defeated (Socialist Federal Republic of Yugoslavia) Nikola Špear / (United States) John Whitlinger 6–3, 6–4

- It was Pala's only title of the year and the 1st of his career. It was Taróczy's only title of the year and the 3rd of his career.
