= 1975 Bavarian Tennis Championships =

- Date: 7–11 May
- Edition: 59th
- Category: Grand Prix (Grade B)
- Draw: 32S / 16D
- Prize money: $50,000
- Surface: Clay
- Location: Munich, West Germany
- Venue: MTTC Iphitos

Champions

Singles
- (Argentina) Guillermo Vilas

Doubles
- (Poland) Wojtek Fibak / (Czechoslovakia) Jan Kodeš
- Bavarian Tennis Championships

The 1975 Bavarian Tennis Championships was a men's Grand Prix tennis circuit tournament held in Munich, West Germany. The tournament was played on outdoor clay courts and was held from 7 May though 11 May 1975. First-seeded Guillermo Vilas won the singles title.

== Finals ==
=== Singles ===
(Argentina) Guillermo Vilas defeated (West Germany) Karl Meiler 2–6, 6–0, 6–2, 6–3

- It was Vilas's 2nd title of the year and the 15th of his career.

=== Doubles ===
(Poland) Wojtek Fibak / (Czechoslovakia) Jan Kodeš defeated (Czechoslovakia) Milan Holeček / (West Germany) Karl Meiler 7–5, 6–3

- It was Fibak's 1st title of the year and the 1st of his career. It was Kodes's 1st title of the year and the 14th of his career.

== See also ==
- 1975 Munich WCT
