= Gallia Club International =

Defunct tennis tournament
- Founded: 1924; 101 years ago
- Abolished: 1968; 57 years ago
- Location: Cannes, France
- Venue: Hôtel Gallia Palace Cannes Lawn Tennis Club
- Surface: Clay / outdoor

The Gallia Club International was a men's and women's international clay court tennis tournament founded in 1924 as the Gallia Club de Cannes Championship. Also known as the Cannes Gallia Club International the tournament was first played at the Gallia Lawn Tennis Club at the Hôtel Gallia Palace in Cannes, France. In 1944 the event moved to the Cannes Lawn Tennis Club where it ran annually until 1968.

== History ==
The Gallia Lawn Tennis Club was built in late 1922 adjacent to the Hôtel Gallia Palace in Cannes. In 1924 it established the Gallia Club de Cannes Championship tournament. The tournament was discontinued due to the second world war. In 1948 the tournament was re-established as the Gallia Club International and continued each year until 1968. In 1960 the hotel was transformed into apartments. In 1993 the Tennis Club was refurbished and became the Lucien Barrière Tennis Club, but now is no more existent.

== Event Names ==
- Gallia Club de Cannes Championship (1924–1929)
- Gallia Club International Championship (1931–1939)
- Gallia Club International (1948–1968)
