= John Whitlinger =

American tennis player (born 1954)

- Country (sports): United States
- Born: February 4, 1954 (age 72) Neenah, Wisconsin, U.S.
- Height: 5 ft 9 in (175 cm)
- Retired: 1982
- Plays: Right-handed
- College: Stanford

Singles
- Career record: 45–77
- Career titles: 0
- Highest ranking: No. 75 (June 2, 1975)

Grand Slam singles results
- French Open: 1R (1977)
- Wimbledon: 1R (1976)
- US Open: 1R (1974, 1975, 1976)

Doubles
- Career record: 75–97
- Career titles: 1
- Highest ranking: No. 854 (January 3, 1983)

Grand Slam doubles results
- French Open: 1R (1977)
- Wimbledon: 1R (1976)
- US Open: 3R (1975)

Coaching achievements
- Coachee singles titles total: 1 (2010, Bradley Klahn)
- Coachees doubles titles total: 1 (2004, KC Corkery and Sam Worburg)

Coaching awards and records
- Awards 1997 ITA National Assistant Coach of the Year

John Whitlinger (born February 4, 1954) is a former professional tennis player from the United States.

== Playing career ==
Whitlinger played in 10 majors in his career. He won one doubles title in his career and reached the round of 16 in singles at the Cincinnati Open in 1974. As a collegiate player at Stanford, he won the NCAA “triple crown” of tennis (singles, doubles, and team championships) in 1974.

== Career finals ==
=== Doubles (1–6) ===
Result	W/L	Date	Tournament	Surface	Partner	Opponents	Score
Loss	0–1	Aug 1974	Cincinnati, U.S.	Hard	(United States) James Delaney	(United States) Dick Dell (United States) Sherwood Stewart	6–4, 6–7, 2–6
Loss	0–2	Jul 1975	Chicago, U.S.	Carpet	(United States) Mike Cahill	(Australia) John Alexander (Australia) Phil Dent	3–6, 4–6
Loss	0–3	Apr 1976	Sacramento, U.S.	Carpet	(United States) Mike Cahill	(United States) Tom Gorman (United States) Sherwood Stewart	6–3, 4–6, 4–6
Loss	0–4	Aug 1976	Boston, U.S.	Clay	(United States) Mike Cahill	(Australia) Ray Ruffels (Australia) Allan Stone	6–3, 3–6, 6–7
Win	1–4	Sep 1976	Bermuda	Clay	(United States) Mike Cahill	(Australia) Dick Crealy (Australia) Ray Ruffels	6–4, 4–6, 7–6
Loss	1–5	May 1977	Munich, Germany	Clay	(Socialist Federal Republic of Yugoslavia) Nikola Špear	(Czechoslovakia) František Pala (Hungary) Balázs Taróczy	3–6, 4–6
Loss	1–6	Oct 1977	Perth, Australia	Hard	(United States) Nick Saviano	(Australia) Ray Ruffels (Australia) Allan Stone	2–6, 1–6

== Coaching career ==
Whitlinger coached the Stanford men's tennis team as an associate from 1987 to 2004, and as head coach from 2005 until his retirement in 2014. He coached KC Corkery and Sam Warburg to the 2004 NCAA Doubles Championship and Bradley Klahn to the 2010 NCAA Singles Championship.

== Personal ==
Whitlinger married his wife, Jan Martin, in 1980. Whitlinger's son J.J. (John Jr.) Whitlinger is a men's tennis coach at Furman University. His daughter, Dr. Claire Whitlinger, is a Professor of Sociology at Furman University. He has two nieces who are professional tennis players, Teri and Tami Whitlinger, and he is the son of former professional basketball player Warren Whitlinger.

== Honors and awards ==
- 1997 ITA National Associate Coach of the Year
- Fox River Valley Tennis Hall of Fame Class of 1998
- ITA Collegiate Hall of Fame Class of 1999
- 2006 Pac-10 Coach of the Year
- USTA Midwest Section Hall of Fame Class of 2010
- Neenah High School Hall of Fame Class of 2015
- Stanford Athletic Hall of Fame 1978
