= Buster Mottram =

English tennis player

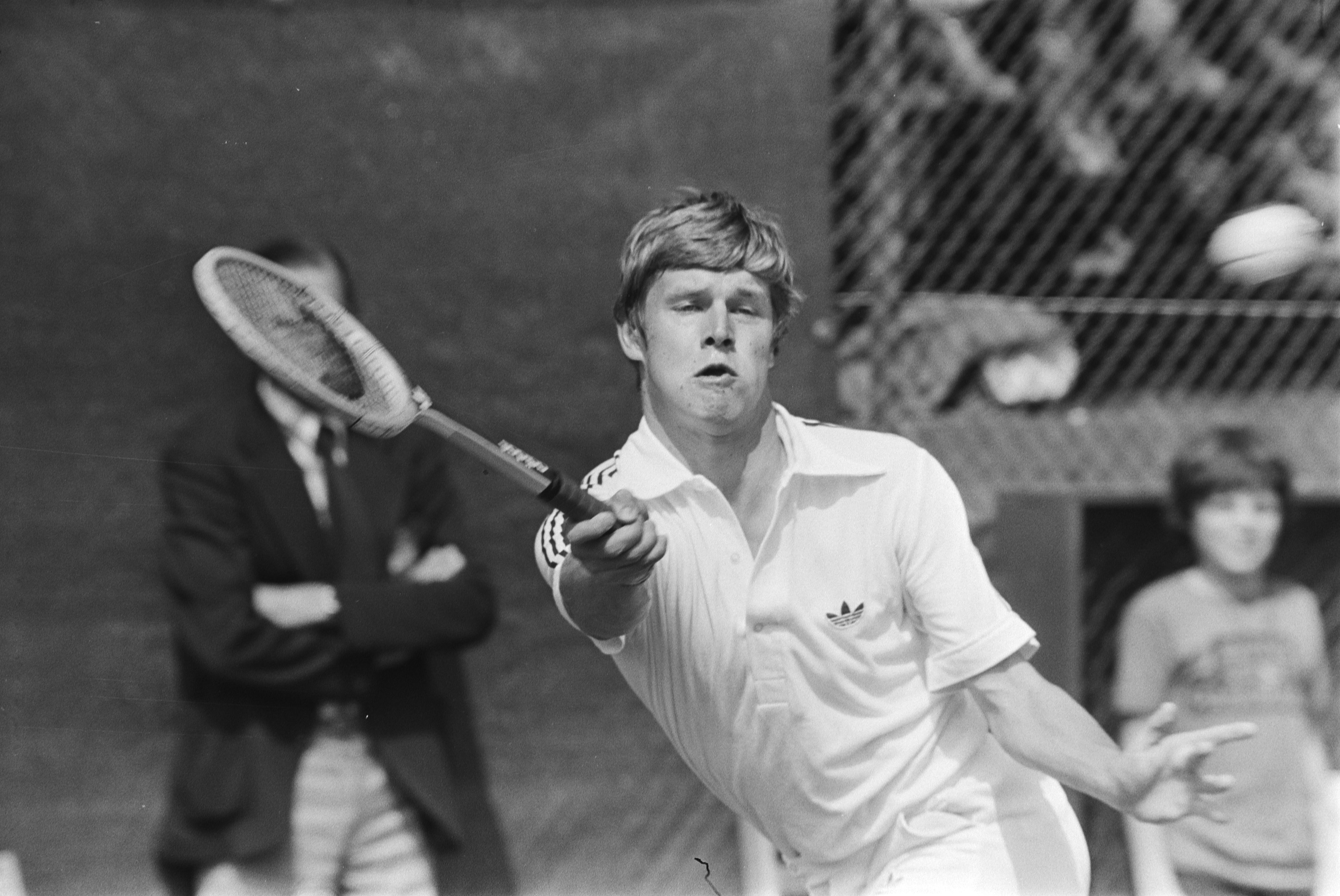
- Country (sports): United Kingdom
- Residence: Kingston upon Thames, England
- Born: 25 April 1955 (age 71) Kingston upon Thames, England
- Height: 6 ft 3 in (1.91 m)
- Plays: Right-handed (one-handed backhand)

Singles
- Career record: 285–171
- Career titles: 2
- Highest ranking: No. 15 (17 July 1978)

Grand Slam singles results
- French Open: 4R (1977)
- Wimbledon: 4R (1982)
- US Open: 4R (1980)

Doubles
- Career record: 111–118
- Career titles: 5
- Highest ranking: No. 164 (3 January 1983)

Grand Slam doubles results
- Wimbledon: 3R (1981, 1983)
- US Open: 3R (1973)

Team competitions
- Davis Cup: F (1978), SF (1981)

Christopher "Buster" Mottram (born 25 April 1955 in Kingston upon Thames) is an English former tennis player and UK number 1, who achieved a career-high singles ranking of world No. 15 on 17 July 1978 and again on 7 February 1983.

== Early life ==
Mottram is the son of Tony Mottram and Joy Gannon, leading British tennis players in the 1950s. He was brought up in south-west London and educated at King's College School in Wimbledon. His sister Linda was also a successful tennis player, who competed at the Wimbledon Championships alongside her brother in 1978.

== Career ==
Mottram was a promising tennis player from an early age, having been coached by his father with the assistance of the Lawn Tennis Association. Having already emerged as the youngest-ever winner of the British under-21 championships, the zenith of his junior career came upon reaching the finals of the Boys' Singles tournaments at both the French Open and Wimbledon in 1972; while prevailing at Roland Garros (becoming only the second ever British champion), he lost the Junior Wimbledon final to Björn Borg in three closely-contested sets. Mottram also competed in the Men's Singles draw at Wimbledon that same year, losing in the second round to Dick Stockton.

Much of Mottram's success as an adult professional came early: in April 1975, aged 19, he won his first title at the Johannesburg WCT event, defeating Bob Hewitt and Björn Borg en route to a straight-sets triumph over the fourth seed Tom Okker in the final. That same year he engineered an even more "spectacular" win over recent Wimbledon victor Arthur Ashe in the finals of the inaugural Nations Cup in Kingston, Jamaica. But this promising start failed to materialise into anything more enduring, and his only other singles title came the following year at Palma de Mallorca in Spain. From then on, Mottram solidified his reputation as a consistent journeyman with a preference for the clay court season (somewhat unusual in a British player). His finest Grand Slam appearance was on that surface, when he recorded impressive wins over Patrick Proisy and Paolo Bertolucci during the opening stages of the French Open in 1977 before narrowly losing in the fourth round to the reigning champion, Adriano Panatta. (Bertolucci later admitted that losing to Mottram after taking the first set 6–0 was the most regrettable moment of his career.)

Mottram succeeded Mark Cox as British No. 1 in 1978, a position he held until 1983. After losing four singles finals in 1977/78 (twice to Guillermo Vilas, his toughest and most frequent opponent on clay), Mottram's main achievements were in doubles tournaments. In 1982, however, he made a run to the fourth round of Wimbledon (his best ever performance there in either singles or doubles) and lost by a slender margin in the final of the Dutch Open. After hovering in the lower reaches of the world's top 20 for most of that year, Mottram peaked at No. 15 for the second time in February 1983. This was a coda to his career, however, for he retired from professional tennis just seven months later, citing dissatisfaction with the "hassle" involved in playing international tournaments throughout the year.

=== Davis Cup ===
Perhaps more important than any individual achievement was Mottram's record in the Davis Cup; in the words of one contemporary observer, he "thrives on team spirit and is one of the few for whom the responsibility of playing for his country brings out the best in both his tennis and character." This was not always obvious, for Mottram's relationship with the British tennis authorities – and other players – was often turbulent and abrasive. For over 18 months Mottram refused to play under Paul Hutchins, Britain's Davis Cup captain, after the latter criticised his performance at Wimbledon during the 1976 Championships. When Mottram called upon Hutchins to resign it unsettled several members of the Cup team so much that they felt compelled to strike back: John Lloyd, in an interview with the Daily Express, said that Mottram "has gone too far this time, even by his own standards. He is a tragic tennis case... one of those players who thinks he's bigger than his country; bigger than everything."

Mottram and Hutchins were subsequently reconciled, but further trouble ensued when anti-fascist protestors camped outside Redlands Tennis Club in Bristol to protest at Mottram's inclusion in the squad that would face Austria in the European quarter-final of the 1978 Davis Cup. And yet, despite this and other controversial episodes off the court, Mottram was to emerge as the leading figure in the British team's successful journey to the Cup final that year, registering vital triumphs at various stages of the competition. Arguably, his best ever Cup performance was against world No. 7 Brian Gottfried in the second rubber of the final, when he came back from two sets and match point down to win in five. Another impressive showing came the following year, when he executed a near-flawless victory (6–0, 6–4, 6–4) over Adriano Panatta in front of an aggressively partisan crowd at the Foro Italico in Rome. (He defeated Panatta in all three of their Davis Cup meetings.) Overall, Mottram represented Britain in the Davis Cup eight times, scoring 31 wins and just 10 losses.

== Career finals ==
=== Singles: 7 (2 titles / 5 runner-ups) ===
Result	W-L	Date	Tournament	Surface	Opponent	Score
Win	1–0	Apr 1975	Johannesburg, South Africa	Hard	(Netherlands) Tom Okker	6–4, 6–2
Win	2–0	Apr 1976	Palma, Majorca, Spain	Clay	(Japan) Jun Kuki	7–5, 6–3, 6–3
Loss	2–1	Feb 1977	Dayton, U.S.	Carpet (i)	(United States) Jeff Borowiak	3–6, 3–6
Loss	2–2	Apr 1977	Murcia, Spain	Clay	(Spain) José Higueras	4–6, 0–6, 3–6
Loss	2–3	Dec 1977	Johannesburg, South Africa	Hard	(Argentina) Guillermo Vilas	6–7^{(4–7)}, 3–6, 4–6
Loss	2–4	May 1978	Munich, West Germany	Clay	(Argentina) Guillermo Vilas	1–6, 3–6, 3–6
Loss	2–5	Jul 1982	Hilversum, Netherlands	Clay	(Hungary) Balázs Taróczy	6–7^{(5–7)}, 7–6^{(7–3)}, 3–6, 6–7^{(5–7)}

=== Doubles: 11 (5 titles / 6 runner-ups) ===
Result	W-L	Date	Tournament	Surface	Partner	Opponents	Score
Win	1–0	Apr 1974	Charlotte, U.S.	Unknown	(Mexico) Raúl Ramírez	(Australia) Owen Davidson (Australia) John Newcombe	6–3, 1–6, 6–3
Win	2–0	Jul 1977	Kitzbühel, Austria	Clay	(United Kingdom) Roger Taylor	(Switzerland) Colin Dowdeswell (Australia) Chris Kachel	7–6, 6–4
Win	3–0	Oct 1977	Basel, Switzerland	Carpet	(United Kingdom) Mark Cox	(United Kingdom) John Feaver (Australia) John James	7–5, 6–4, 6–3
Loss	3–1	Oct 1978	Tokyo, Japan	Clay	(Socialist Federal Republic of Yugoslavia) Željko Franulović	(Australia) Ross Case (Australia) Geoff Masters	2–6, 6–4, 1–6
Loss	3–2	Nov 1979	Johannesburg, South Africa	Hard	(United States) Mike Cahill	(South Africa) Bob Hewitt (South Africa) Frew McMillan	6–1, 1–6, 4–6
Loss	3–3	Jul 1980	Hilversum, Netherlands	Clay	(United States) Tony Giammalva	(Netherlands) Tom Okker (Hungary) Balázs Taróczy	5–7, 3–6, 6–7
Win	4–3	Mar 1981	Stuttgart, West Germany	Carpet	(United States) Nick Saviano	(United States) Craig Edwards (United States) Eddie Edwards	3–6, 6–1, 6–2
Loss	4–4	Apr 1981	Bournemouth, UK	Clay	(Czechoslovakia) Tomáš Šmíd	(Argentina) Ricardo Cano (Paraguay) Víctor Pecci	4–6, 6–3, 3–6
Loss	4–5	Feb 1982	Genoa, Italy	Carpet	(United States) Mike Cahill	(Czechoslovakia) Pavel Složil (Czechoslovakia) Tomáš Šmíd	7–6, 5–7, 3–6
Win	5–5	Apr 1982	Bournemouth, UK	Clay	(Australia) Paul McNamee	(France) Henri Leconte (Romania) Ilie Năstase	3–6, 7–6, 6–3
Loss	5–6	Oct 1982	Amsterdam, Netherlands	Carpet (i)	(South Africa) Kevin Curren	(United States) Fritz Buehning (Czechoslovakia) Tomáš Šmíd	6–4, 3–6, 0–6

== Politics ==
While Mottram was still playing professionally, he became known for his right-wing views. He expressed support for the National Front, supported the policies of Enoch Powell, and applied unsuccessfully for the Conservative parliamentary candidacy in several constituencies. He also competed in South Africa at a time when many players were boycotting events there, leading to his appearance on a United Nations blacklist (alongside other players such as Guillermo Vilas and Billie Jean King).

Mottram's politics strained the already tense relationship he had with the British tennis establishment, who were reportedly angry when he wrote a letter supporting Margaret Thatcher in her battles with the trades unions and signed it "on behalf of the Davis Cup team". He subsequently formed a songwriting partnership with the black entertainer Kenny Lynch, writing the song "Average Man".

In November 2008, Mottram was expelled from the UK Independence Party (UKIP) after attempting to broker an electoral pact with the British National Party. UKIP leader Nigel Farage said there were "no circumstances whatsoever" in which UKIP would do a deal with the BNP, declaring his party to be non-racist.
