= Antonio Muñoz (tennis) =

Spanish tennis player (born 1951)

- Country (sports): Spain
- Born: 1 March 1951 (age 75) Barcelona, Spain
- Plays: Right-handed

Singles
- Career record: 216–259
- Career titles: 2
- Highest ranking: No. 74 (15 October 1973)

Grand Slam singles results
- French Open: 3R (1974)
- Wimbledon: 2R (1979)
- US Open: 2R (1972, 1974, 1975, 1977)

Doubles
- Career record: 108–129
- Career titles: 3

Grand Slam doubles results
- French Open: QF (1972)
- Wimbledon: 2R (1970)
- US Open: QF (1972)

Team competitions
- Davis Cup: SF (1972)

Antonio Muñoz (born 1 March 1951) is a former professional tennis player from Barcelona, Spain.

Muñoz won two singles titles. He won the 1968 Cannes Gallia Club International defeating José Guerrero in the final. He won the 1977 France 1 Indoor Satellite where he defeated Christophe Roger-Vasselin, a later semifinalist in the French Open, in the final.

He reached a career-high singles ranking of world No. 74 in 1973. As a junior, Muñoz won the boys' singles at the French Open in 1969.

During his career, Muñoz reached seven ATP doubles finals, winning on three occasions.

== Career finals ==
=== Doublesl: 7 (3 titles / 4 runner-ups) ===
Legend
Grand Slam (0)
Tennis Masters Cup (0)
ATP Masters Series (0)
ATP Tour (3)

Result	W-L	Date	Tournament	Surface	Partner	Opponents	Score
Loss	0–1	Oct 1973	Barcelona, Spain	Clay	(Spain) Manuel Orantes	(Romania) Ilie Năstase (Netherlands) Tom Okker	6–4, 3–6, 2–6
Win	1–1	May 1974	Munich, West Germany	Clay	(Spain) Manuel Orantes	(West Germany) Jürgen Fassbender (West Germany) Hans-Jürgen Pohmann	2–6, 6–4, 7–6, 6–2
Win	2–1	Oct 1974	Madrid, Spain	Clay	(France) Patrice Dominguez	(United States) Brian Gottfried (Mexico) Raúl Ramírez	6–1, 6–3
Win	3–1	Jul 1977	Hilversum, Netherlands	Grass	(Spain) José Higueras	(France) Jean-Louis Haillet (France) François Jauffret	6–1, 6–4, 2–6, 6–1
Loss	3–2	Oct 1977	Madrid, Spain	Clay	(Spain) Manuel Orantes	(South Africa) Bob Hewitt (South Africa) Frew McMillan	7–6, 6–7, 3–6, 1–6
Loss	3–3	Nov 1977	Buenos Aires, Argentina	Clay	(Argentina) Ricardo Cano	(Romania) Ion Țiriac (Argentina) Guillermo Vilas	4–6, 0–6
Loss	3–4	May 1978	Hamburg, West Germany	Clay	(Paraguay) Víctor Pecci	(Poland) Wojciech Fibak (Netherlands) Tom Okker	2–6, 4–6
