= Milan Holeček =

Czech tennis player (born 1943)

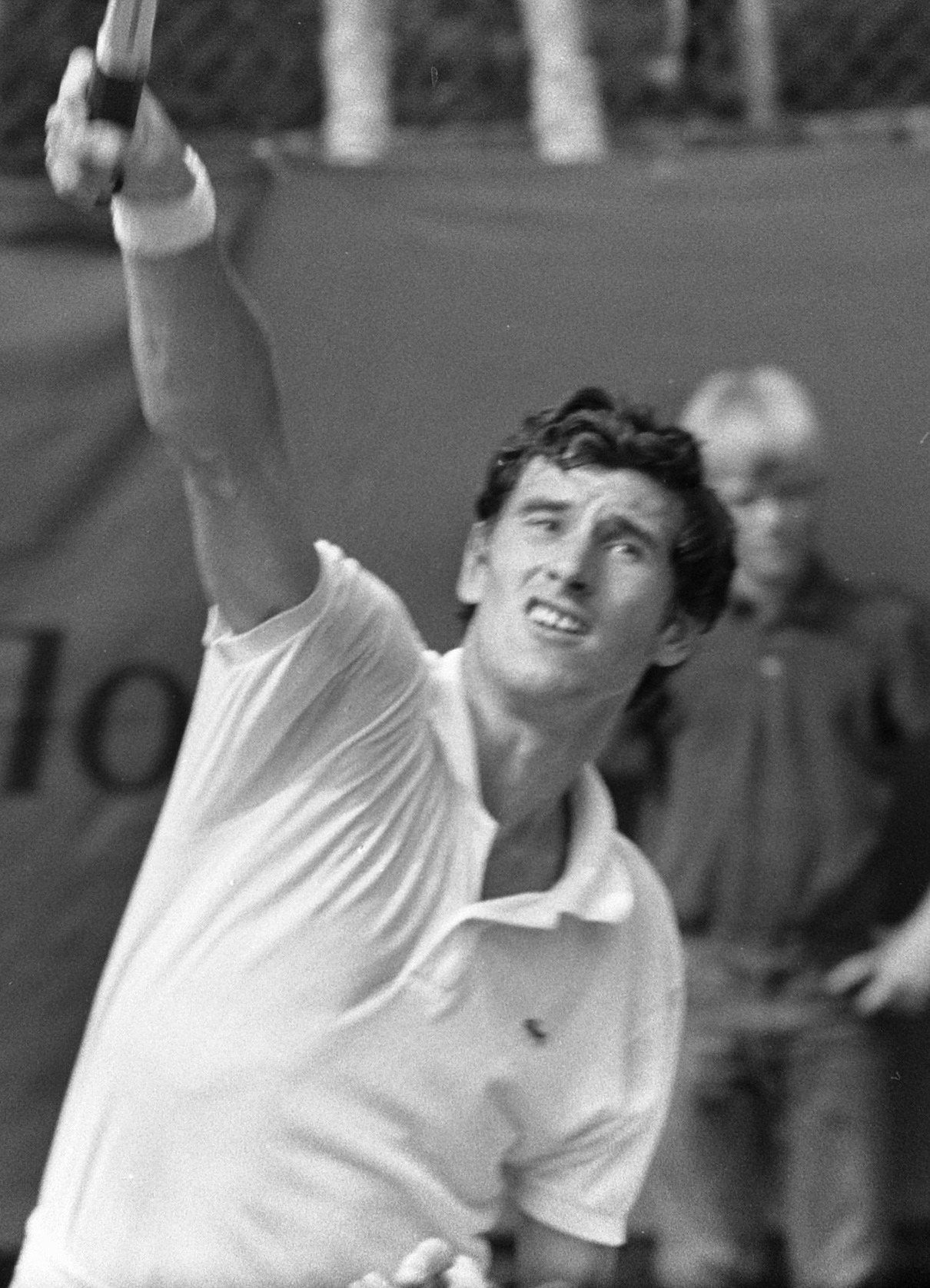
- Country (sports): Czechoslovakia
- Born: 23 October 1943 (age 82) Pardubice, Czechoslovakia
- Height: 6 ft 3 in (191 cm)
- Plays: Right-handed

Singles
- Career record: 117–159
- Career titles: 1
- Highest ranking: No. 71 (19 April 1974)

Grand Slam singles results
- Australian Open: 2R (1974)
- French Open: 4R (1967, 1973)
- Wimbledon: 3R (1969)
- US Open: 4R (1971)

Doubles
- Career record: 70–103
- Highest ranking: No. 94 (1 March 1976)

Milan Holeček (born 23 October 1943) is a right-handed former professional tennis player from Czechoslovakia, who retired in 1976. He reached a career-high ranking of No. 71 in singles on 19 April 1974.

== Open Era career finals ==
=== Singles (1 win – 1 loss) ===
Result	W–L	Date	Tournament	Surface	Opponent	Score
Loss	0–1	Mar 1969	Kingston, Jamaica	Hard (i)	(Brazil) Thomaz Koch	2–6, 3–6
Win	1–1	Mar 1971	Pensacola, United States	Hard (i)	(Socialist Federal Republic of Yugoslavia) Nikola Špear	4–6, 6–3, 6–3

=== Singles (1 wins – 1 loss) ===
Result	W–L	Date	Tournament	Surface	Opponents	Opponents	Score
Win	1–0	May 1971	Houston, United States	Clay	(New Zealand) Onny Parun	(United States) Tom Edlefsen (United States) Frank Froehling	1–6, 7–6, 6–4
Loss	1–1	May 1975	Munich, Germany	Clay	(West Germany) Karl Meiler	(Poland) Wojciech Fibak (Czechoslovakia) Jan Kodeš	5–7, 3–6
