= František Pála =

Czech tennis player

- Country (sports): Czechoslovakia
- Residence: Brussels, Belgium
- Born: 28 March 1944 (age 82) Velké Popovice, Bohemia and Moravia
- Plays: Left-handed

Singles
- Career record: 57–108
- Career titles: 0

Grand Slam singles results
- French Open: 3R (1970, 1972)
- Wimbledon: 3R (1972)
- US Open: 2R (1975)

Doubles
- Career record: 61–94
- Career titles: 1

Grand Slam doubles results
- French Open: 2R (1970, 1971, 1972, 1975, 1976)
- Wimbledon: 2R (1971, 1972)
- US Open: 1R (1971, 1976)

František Pála (born 28 March 1944) is a former professional tennis player from the Czech Republic who competed for Czechoslovakia. His son Petr was also a tennis player.

== Career ==
The Czechoslovak player took part in 15 Davis Cup ties for his national team, the first in 1966. At a tie in Barcelona in 1972, Pala had a win over Manuel Orantes. Earlier that year, in a tie against Sweden, Pala defeated Björn Borg, although the Swede was only 15 at the time. In all he played 25 rubbers, of which he won 15, all but one of them in singles. He later served as Czechoslovak Davis Cup captain.

Pála, who won the Czechoslovak Championships in 1973, played in the singles draw of 18 Grand Slam tournaments and made the third round three times, at the 1970 French Open, 1972 French Open and 1972 Wimbledon Championships.

He had his best year on the tennis circuit in 1972, when he was a finalist at Monte Carlo and Madrid, losing both matches to Ilie Năstase. As a doubles player he was able to reach three finals and won one of them, the 1977 BMW Open.

== Grand Prix/WCT career finals ==
=== Singles: 2 (0–2) ===
Result	W/L	Date	Tournament	Surface	Opponent	Score
Loss	0–1	Apr 1972	Monte Carlo, Monaco	Clay	(Romania) Ilie Năstase	1–6, 0–6, 3–6
Loss	0–2	Apr 1972	Madrid, Spain	Clay	(Romania) Ilie Năstase	0–6, 0–6, 1–6

=== Doubles: 3 (1–2) ===
Result	W/L	Date	Tournament	Surface	Partner	Opponents	Score
Loss	0–1	Apr 1972	Monte Carlo, Monaco	Clay	(Czechoslovakia) Jiří Hřebec	(France) Patrice Beust (France) Daniel Contet	6–3, 1–6, 10–12, 2–6
Loss	0–2	Jul 1974	Kitzbühel, Austria	Clay	(Hungary) Balázs Taróczy	(Colombia) Iván Molina (Colombia) Jairo Velasco	6–2, 6–7, 4–6, 4–6
Win	1–2	May 1977	Munich, West Germany	Clay	(Hungary) Balázs Taróczy	(Socialist Federal Republic of Yugoslavia) Nikola Špear (United States) John Whitlinger	6–3, 6–4
