= Hans-Jürgen Pohmann =

German tennis player

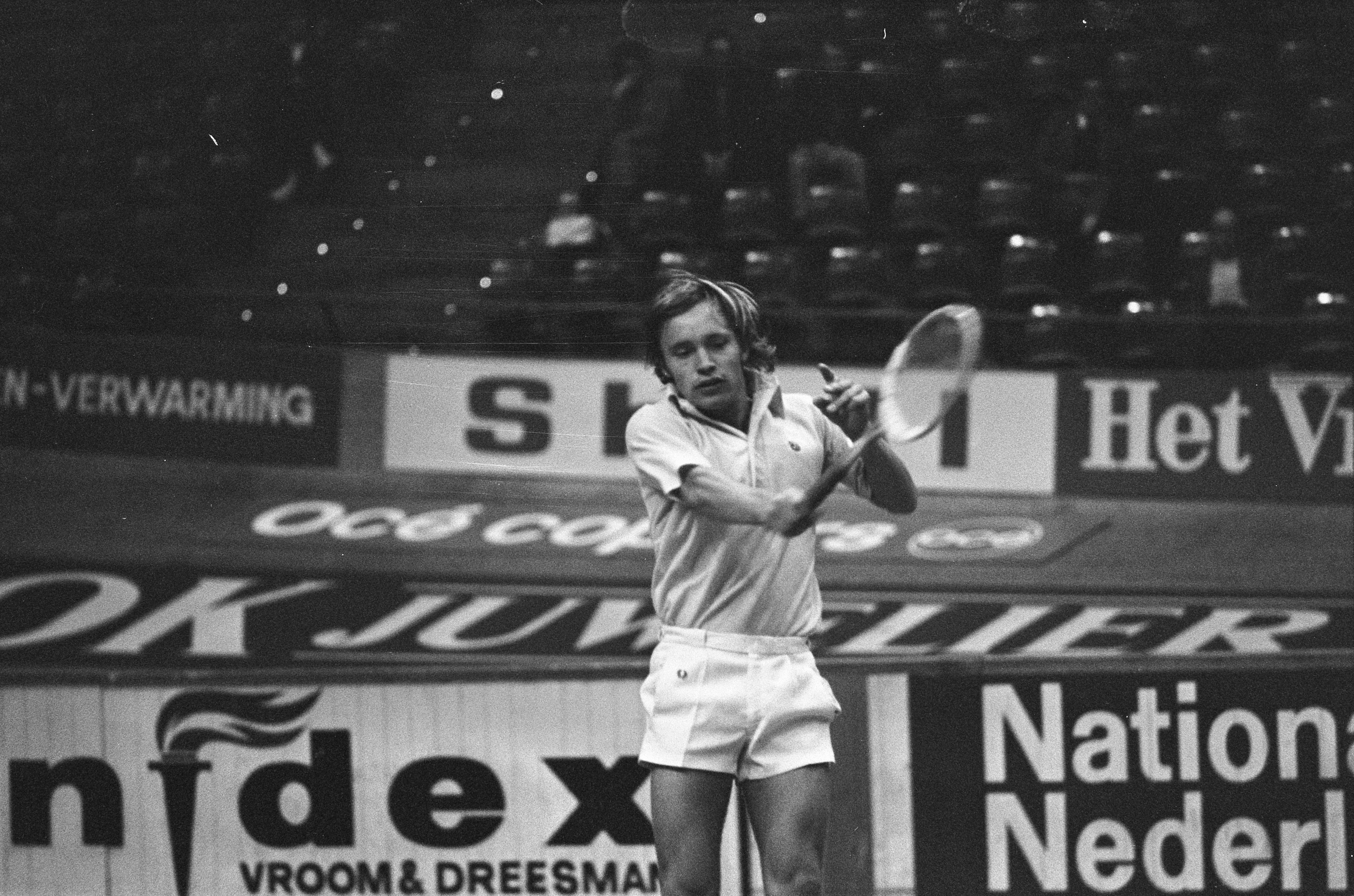
- Country (sports): West Germany
- Born: 23 May 1947 (age 79) Cologne, West Germany
- Height: 1.78 m (5 ft 10 in)
- Plays: Right-handed

Singles
- Career record: 118–124
- Career titles: 1
- Highest ranking: No. 30 (23 August 1973)

Grand Slam singles results
- French Open: QF (1974)
- Wimbledon: 4R (1973)
- US Open: 3R (1975)

Doubles
- Career record: 155–96
- Career titles: 5

Grand Slam doubles results
- French Open: SF (1973)
- Wimbledon: SF (1975)
- US Open: 3R (1975)

Other doubles tournaments
- Tour Finals: RR – 2nd (1975)

Hans-Jürgen Pohmann (born 23 May 1947) is a former professional tennis player from Germany.

During his career, Pohmann won one singles and five doubles titles on the Grand Prix circuit (precursor to the ATP Tour). He reached the quarter finals of the 1974 French Open, beating Adriano Panatta before losing to François Jauffret. As of 2011, he was a commentator for the German television network RBB.

Pohmann was involved in a controversial second round match at the 1976 US Open against Ilie Năstase. At 5–5 in the deciding third set Năstase was furious at a photographer and hit a ball at him and swung his racket near him. The crowd were at fever pitch by this point. Then Pohmann "lunged for a ball and fell grimacing painfully to the ground holding his right leg in great pain". There was a delay and the cramp subsided and "Pohmann continued to Năstase's obvious annoyance. Three times Pohmann went down on his cramped leg and three times he came back to fight Năstase to a standstill". With the aid of the tournament physician, who attended the leg, Pohmann saved three match points and the set entered a tie-break. Năstase was screaming at the umpire and making obscenities to the crowd. Pohmann had two match points but Năstase won and then screamed at Pohmann as the two approached the net. The umpire George Armstrong refused to shake Năstase's hand as the Romanian continued raving. Năstase and Pohmann nearly came to blows in the clubhouse after the match before being separated. Later, Năstase claimed the match should have been forfeited to him when Pohmann was unable to continue play immediately.

== Career finals ==
=== Singles (1 title, 2 runner-ups) ===
Result	W/L	Date	Tournament	Surface	Opponent	Scores
Win	1–0	Jun 1973	Berlin, Germany	Hard	(West Germany) Karl Meiler	6–3, 3–6, 6–3, 6–3
Loss	1–1	Nov 1974	Manila, Philippines	Hard	(Egypt) Ismail El Shafei	6–7, 1–6
Loss	1–2	Jun 1976	Berlin, Germany	Hard	(Paraguay) Víctor Pecci	1–6, 2–6, 7–5, 3–6

=== Doubles (5 titles, 13 runner-ups) ===
Result	W/L	Date	Tournament	Surface	Partner	Opponents	Scores
Win	1.	Jul 1972	Kitzbühel, Austria	Clay	(West Germany) Jürgen Fassbender	(Australia) Mal Anderson (Australia) Geoff Masters	7–6, 6–4, 6–4
Win	2.	Jun 1973	Hamburg, Germany	Clay	(West Germany) Jürgen Fassbender	(Spain) Manuel Orantes (Romania) Ion Țiriac	7–6, 7–6, 7–6
Loss	1.	Oct 1973	Manila, Philippines	Hard	(West Germany) Jürgen Fassbender	(Mexico) Marcello Lara (United States) Sherwood Stewart	2–6, 0–6
Loss	2.	May 1974	Munich, Germany	Clay	(West Germany) Jürgen Fassbender	(Spain) Antonio Muñoz (Spain) Manuel Orantes	6–2, 4–6, 6–7, 2–6
Win	3.	May 1974	Hamburg, Germany	Clay	(West Germany) Jürgen Fassbender	(United States) Brian Gottfried (Mexico) Raúl Ramírez	6–3, 6–4, 6–4
Loss	3.	Aug 1974	Indianapolis, U.S.	Clay	(West Germany) Jürgen Fassbender	(United States) Jimmy Connors (Romania) Ilie Năstase	7–6, 3–6, 4–6
Loss	4.	Aug 1974	Montreal, Canada	Hard	(West Germany) Jürgen Fassbender	(Spain) Manuel Orantes (Argentina) Guillermo Vilas	1–6, 6–2, 2–6
Loss	5.	Aug 1974	Boston, U.S.	Clay	(United States) Marty Riessen	(United States) Robert Lutz (United States) Stan Smith	6–3, 4–6, 3–6
Loss	6.	Nov 1974	Jakarta, Indonesia	Hard	(West Germany) Jürgen Fassbender	(Egypt) Ismail El Shafei (United States) Roscoe Tanner	5–7, 3–6
Loss	7.	Mar 1975	London WCT, UK	Carpet	(West Germany) Jürgen Fassbender	(Italy) Paolo Bertolucci (Italy) Adriano Panatta	3–6, 4–6
Win	4.	Jul 1975	Gstaad, Switzerland	Clay	(West Germany) Jürgen Fassbender	(United Kingdom) Colin Dowdeswell (Australia) Ken Rosewall	6–4, 9–7, 6–1
Loss	8.	Aug 1975	Indianapolis, U.S.	Clay	(Poland) Wojciech Fibak	(Spain) Juan Gisbert Sr. (Spain) Manuel Orantes	5–7, 0–6
Loss	9.	Aug 1975	Columbus, U.S.	Hard	(West Germany) Jürgen Fassbender	(United States) Robert Lutz (United States) Stan Smith	2–6, 7–6, 3–6
Loss	10.	Nov 1975	Buenos Aires, Argentina	Clay	(West Germany) Jürgen Fassbender	(Italy) Paolo Bertolucci (Italy) Adriano Panatta	6–7, 7–6, 4–6
Loss	11.	May 1976	Munich, Germany	Clay	(West Germany) Jürgen Fassbender	(Spain) Juan Gisbert Sr. (Spain) Manuel Orantes	6–1, 3–6, 2–6, 3–2, ret.
Loss	12.	Jun 1976	Berlin, Germany	Hard	(West Germany) Jürgen Fassbender	(Chile) Patricio Cornejo (Spain) Antonio Muñoz	5–7, 1–6
Win	5.	Jul 1976	Gstaad, Switzerland	Clay	(West Germany) Jürgen Fassbender	(Italy) Paolo Bertolucci (Italy) Adriano Panatta	7–5, 6–3, 6–3
Loss	13.	Jul 1976	Kitzbühel, Austria	Clay	(West Germany) Jürgen Fassbender	(Czechoslovakia) Jiří Hřebec (Czechoslovakia) Jan Kodeš	7–6, 2–6, 4–6
