= Ulrich Pinner =

German tennis player

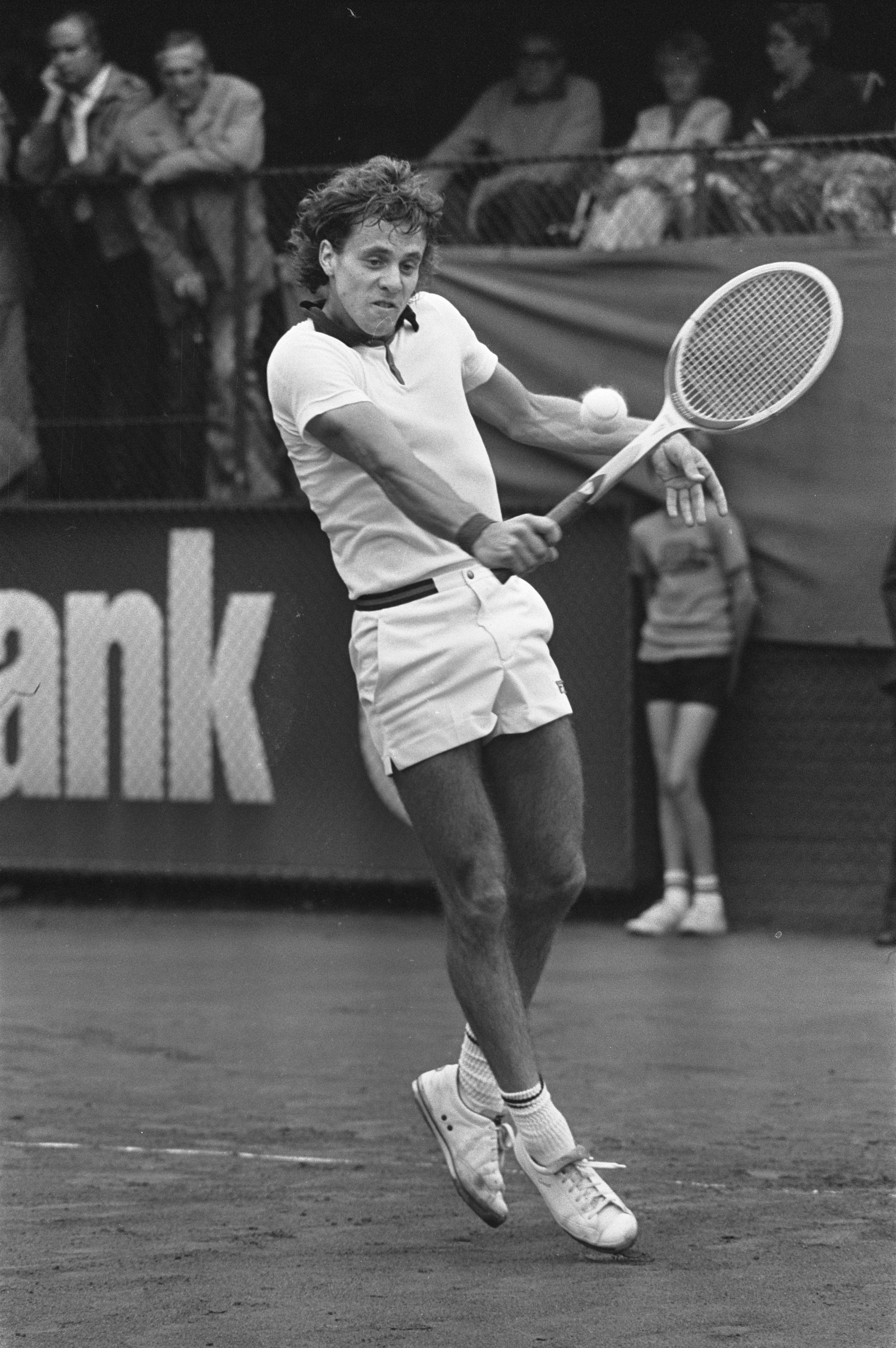
- Pinner, 1975 in Hilversum
- Country (sports): West Germany
- Residence: Essen, Germany
- Born: 7 February 1954 (age 71); Zittau, East Germany
- Turned pro: 1973
- Retired: 1984
- Plays: Right-handed (one-handed backhand)

Singles
- Career record: 138–125
- Career titles: 2 ATP, 2 Challenger
- Highest ranking: No. 19 (13 August 1979)

Grand Slam singles results
- Australian Open: 2R (1975)
- French Open: 3R (1976, 1977)
- Wimbledon: 3R (1975, 1976)

Doubles
- Career record: 17–51
- Career titles: 0
- Highest ranking: No. 521 (8 October 1981)

Grand Slam doubles results
- Australian Open: 2R (1974)

Ulrich Pinner (born 7 February 1954) is a former professional tennis player from Germany. He achieved a career-high singles ranking of world No. 19 in August 1979 and was the German No. 1 from 1978-1980.

Pinner participated in ten Davis Cup ties for West Germany from 1976 to 1982, posting a 12–8 record in singles and a 2–1 record in doubles.

== Career finals ==
=== Singles: 5 (4–1) ===
Legend
Grand Slam (0)
ATP Masters Series (0)
ATP Tour (2)
Challengers (2)

Result	No.	Year	Tournament	Surface	Opponent	Score
Win	1.	1978	Stuttgart Outdoor, Germany	Clay	(Australia) Kim Warwick	6–2, 6–2, 7–6
Win	2.	1979	Gstaad, Switzerland	Clay	(Australia) Peter McNamara	6–2, 6–4, 7–5
Loss	1.	1979	Stuttgart Outdoor, Germany	Clay	(Czechoslovakia) Tomáš Šmíd	4–6, 0–6, 2–6
Win	3.	1981	Barcelona, Spain	Clay	(Spain) Miguel Mir	6–3, 6–1
Win	4.	1981	Travemünde, Germany	Clay	(West Germany) Peter Elter	6–4, 4–6, 6–3
