= Bavarian International Tennis Championships =

Coordinates: 48°11′06″N 11°36′50″E

BMW Open
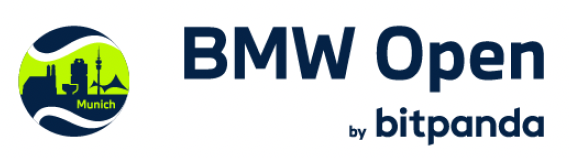

ATP Tour
- Event name: BMW Open by Bitpanda
- Founded: 1899; 127 years ago
- Location: Munich; Germany
- Venue: MTTC Iphitos e.V.
- Category: ATP 250 / ATP International Series / ATP World Series (1990–2024); ATP 500 (2025–present)
- Surface: Clay / outdoors
- Draw: 32S / 16D
- Prize money: €2,561,110 (2026)
- Website: bmwopen.de

Current champions (2026)
- Singles: (United States) Ben Shelton
- Doubles: (Germany) Jakob Schnaitter (Germany) Mark Wallner

The BMW Open (its sponsored name since 1990) or the Bavarian International Tennis Championships (German: Internationale Tennis-Meisterschaften von Bayern) is an ATP Tour 500 tennis event held at the MTTC Iphitos in Munich, Germany. The tournament is played on outdoor clay courts as part of the ATP calendar. In 2025, it was upgraded to an ATP 500 level event. Founded in 1899 as a combined men's and women's event, it is also known as the Bavarian Open and is currently presented by Bitpanda.

== History ==
In 1899, the tournament's first edition was held by the tennis club Münchner Tennis- und Turnierclub (MTTC) Iphitos, which was the first tennis club in Munich having been formed in 1892 by students. The club only had grass courts, and the first edition was therefore played on grass. The tournament was founded as a combined men's and women's event, until 1973 when the women's tournament was discontinued. From 1969 the tournament was also branded as the Bavarian Open.

The Center Court of the MTTC has been in Aumeisterweg since 1930, and holds 5,600 people. The tournament has offered prize money since 1970, when the total prizes amounted to $20,000.

== Finals ==
=== Men's singles ===
(incomplete roll)

| Year | Champions | Runners-up | Score |
|---|---|---|---|
| 1899 | (Austria-Hungary) Richard Blaul | (German Empire) Mr. Stratzer | 7–5, 4–6, 6–3. |
| 1900 | (German Empire) Rudolf Pummerer | (United Kingdom) Harold R. Bates | 6–0, 9–7. |
| 1904 | (Czechoslovakia) Zdeněk Žemla | (German Empire) Rudolf Pummerer | 6–1, 6–2, 7–5. |
| 1905 | (German Empire) Rudolf Pummerer | (German Empire) Otto Paul Lindpaintner | 6–1, 6–2, 6–3. |
| 1908 | (United Kingdom) George Logie | (German Empire) Heinrich Kleinschroth | 7–5, 6–2, 6–1. |
| 1909 | (Austria-Hungary) Felix Pipes | (German Empire) Robert Kleinschroth | 6–0, ret. |
| 1910 | (German Empire) Heinrich Kleinschroth | (German Empire) Hugo Albrecht | 6–1, 6–0, 6–1. |
| 1928 | (Argentina) Guillermo Robson | (Denmark) Erik Worm | 6–3, 5–7, 7–5. |
| 1929 | (Italy) Alberto Del Bono | (Denmark) Erik Worm | 6–4, 6–4. |
| 1930 | (France) Emmanuel du Plaix | (United States) Richard B. Bell | 2–6, 6–3, 3–6, 6–2, 6–4. |
| 1931 | (Japan) Hyotaro Sato | (Spain) Enrique Maier | 7–5, 4–6, 7–5, 6–1. |
| 1932 | (Germany) Heinz Remmert | (United States) William Lawrence Breese | 6–1, 3–6, 6–3, 8–6. |
| 1933 | (United States) William Lawrence Breese | (Germany) Edler von der Planitz | 6–4, 6–1. |
| 1935 | (Germany) Heinz Tüscher | (Germany) Eberhard Nourney | 4–6, 6–2, 8–6. |
| 1936 | (Germany) Alfred Gerstl | (Germany) Rolf Göpfert | 6–4, 6–3. |
| 1937 | (Austria) Georg von Metaxa | (Germany) Ludwig Louis Haensch | 4–6, 6–2, 4–6, 7–5, 6–3. |
| 1938 | (Germany) Edmund Bartkowiak | (Germany) Joachim Hildebrandt | 6-3, 6-2, 1-1, ret. |
| 1939 | (Germany) Henner Henkel | (Germany) Engelbert Koch | 6–4, 6–4, 6–2. |
| 1940–1945 | Not held | | |
| 1946 | (Germany) Gottfried von Cramm | (Czechoslovakia) Roderich Menzel | 6–3, 6–0, 6–3. |
| 1947 | (Czechoslovakia) Roderich Menzel | (Germany) Gottfried von Cramm | 6–2, 6–4, 6–2. |
| 1948 | (Germany) Helmuth Gulcz | (Germany) Willi Stingl | 7–5, retd. |
| 1949 | (Germany) Gottfried von Cramm | (Germany) Ernst Buchholz | 3–6, 7–5, 6–1, 6–0. |
| 1950 | (Germany) Gottfried von Cramm | (Czechoslovakia) Jan Dostál | 6–4, 6–4, 6–1. |
| 1951 | (Italy) Rolando Del Bello | (Czechoslovakia) Roderich Menzel | 6–2, 1–6, 7–5, 6–2. |
| 1952 | Not held | | |
| 1953 | (Egypt) Jaroslav Drobný | (Brazil) Armando Vieira | 6–3, 6–1, 6–3. |
| 1954 | (United States) Budge Patty | (United States) Hugh Stewart | 6–4, 6–2, 6–4. |
| 1955 | (United States) Budge Patty | (United States) Art Larsen | 6–3, 6–3, 6–3. |
| 1956 | (United States) Budge Patty | (Australia) Lew Hoad | 1–6, 0–6, 6–2, 7–5, 6–4. |
| 1957 | (Australia) Mervyn Rose | (United States) Budge Patty | 5–7, 12–10, 5–7, 6–2, 6–4. |
| 1958 | (Italy) Orlando Sirola | (Chile) Luis Ayala | 3–6, 7–5, 1–6, 11–9, 6–4. |
| 1959 | (Australia) Bob Hewitt | (France) Pierre Darmon | 6–3, 6–3, 8–6. |
| 1960 | (Australia) Don Candy | (Sweden) Jan-Erik Lundqvist | 5–7, 6–3, 6–0, 3–6, 6–2. |
| 1961 | (Australia) Roy Emerson | (Australia) Bob Hewitt | 6–2, 6–3, 6–2. |
| 1962 | (Brazil) José Edison Mandarino | (Spain) Manuel Santana | 1–6, 6–3, 6–2, 6–4. |
| 1963 | (Chile) Patricio Rodríguez | (Socialist Federal Republic of Yugoslavia) Nikola Pilić | 1–6, 4–6, 7–5, 9–7, 6–2. |
| 1964 | (Spain) Manuel Santana | (Australia) Bob Hewitt | 6–2, 6–3, 11–9. |
| 1965 | (West Germany) Christian Kuhnke | (West Germany) Ingo Buding | 6–4, 6–1, 6–3. |
| 1966 | (Hungary) István Gulyás | (West Germany) Wilhelm Bungert | 6–4, 4–6, 8–6, 9–7. |
| 1967 | (Australia) Martin Mulligan | (West Germany) Wilhelm Bungert | 6–4, 3–6, 6–4, 6–4. |
| 1968 | (Italy) Martin Mulligan | (Romania) Ion Țiriac | 6–3, 3–6, 7–5, 6–3. |
↓ Open Era ↓
| 1969 | (South Africa) Bob Hewitt | (West Germany) Christian Kuhnke | 6–4, 3–6, 6–2, 6–2. |
| 1970 | (Romania) Ion Țiriac | (Socialist Federal Republic of Yugoslavia) Nikola Pilić | 2–6, 9–7, 6–3, 6–4. |
| 1971 | (Spain) Juan Gisbert Sr | (Hungary) Péter Szőke | 6–2, 6–4, 6–4. |
| 1972 | Not held | | |
| 1973 | (United States) Sandy Mayer | (West Germany) Harald Elschenbroich | 6–4, 6–3, 6–3 |
| 1974 | (West Germany) Jürgen Fassbender | (France) François Jauffret | 6–2, 5–7, 6–1, 6–4 |
| 1975 | (Argentina) Guillermo Vilas | (West Germany) Karl Meiler | 2–6, 6–0, 6–2, 6–3 |
| 1976 | (Spain) Manuel Orantes | (West Germany) Karl Meiler | 6–1, 6–4, 6–1 |
| 1977 | (Socialist Federal Republic of Yugoslavia) Željko Franulović | (Paraguay) Víctor Pecci | 6–1, 6–1, 6–7, 7–5 |
| 1978 | (Argentina) Guillermo Vilas | (United Kingdom) Buster Mottram | 6–1, 6–3, 6–3 |
| 1979 | (Spain) Manuel Orantes | (Poland) Wojciech Fibak | 6–3, 6–2, 6–4 |
| 1980 | (West Germany) Rolf Gehring | (France) Christophe Freyss | 6–2, 0–6, 6–2, 6–2 |
| 1981 | (New Zealand) Chris Lewis | (France) Christophe Roger-Vasselin | 4–6, 6–2, 2–6, 6–1, 6–1 |
| 1982 | (United States) Gene Mayer | (West Germany) Peter Elter | 3–6, 6–3, 6–2, 6–1 |
| 1983 | (Czechoslovakia) Tomáš Šmíd | (Sweden) Joakim Nyström | 6–0, 6–3, 4–6, 2–6, 7–5 |
| 1984 | (Czechoslovakia) Libor Pimek | (United States) Gene Mayer | 6–4, 4–6, 7–6, 6–4 |
| 1985 | (Sweden) Joakim Nyström | (West Germany) Hans Schwaier | 6–1, 6–0 |
| 1986 | (Spain) Emilio Sánchez | (West Germany) Ricki Osterthun | 6–1, 6–3 |
| 1987 | (Argentina) Guillermo Pérez Roldán | (Czechoslovakia) Marián Vajda | 6–3, 7–6 |
| 1988 | (Argentina) Guillermo Pérez Roldán | (Sweden) Jonas Svensson | 7–5, 6–3 |
| 1989 | (Soviet Union) Andrei Chesnokov | (Czechoslovakia) Martin Střelba | 5–7, 7–6, 6–2 |
↓ ATP Tour 250 (Note: Known as World Series from 1990 till 1999 and International Series from 2000 till 2008.) ↓
| 1990 | (Czechoslovakia) Karel Nováček | (Austria) Thomas Muster | 6–4, 6–2 |
| 1991 | (Sweden) Magnus Gustafsson | (Argentina) Guillermo Pérez Roldán | 3–6, 6–3, 4–3, retired |
| 1992 | (Sweden) Magnus Larsson | (Czechoslovakia) Petr Korda | 6–4, 4–6, 6–1 |
| 1993 | (United States) Ivan Lendl | (Germany) Michael Stich | 7–6^{(7–2)}, 6–3 |
| 1994 | (Germany) Michael Stich | (Czech Republic) Petr Korda | 6–2, 2–6, 6–3 |
| 1995 | (South Africa) Wayne Ferreira | (Germany) Michael Stich | 7–5, 7–6^{(8–6)} |
| 1996 | (Czech Republic) Slava Doseděl | (Spain) Carlos Moyá | 6–4, 4–6, 6–3 |
| 1997 | (Australia) Mark Philippoussis | (Spain) Àlex Corretja | 7–6^{(7–3)}, 1–6, 6–4 |
| 1998 | (Sweden) Thomas Enqvist | (United States) Andre Agassi | 6–7^{(4–7)}, 7–6^{(8–6)}, 6–4 |
| 1999 | (Argentina) Franco Squillari | (Romania) Andrei Pavel | 6–4, 6–3 |
| 2000 | (Argentina) Franco Squillari | (Germany) Tommy Haas | 6–4, 6–4 |
| 2001 | (Czech Republic) Jiří Novák | (France) Anthony Dupuis | 6–4, 7–5 |
| 2002 | (Morocco) Younes El Aynaoui | (Germany) Rainer Schüttler | 6–4, 6–4 |
| 2003 | (Switzerland) Roger Federer | (Finland) Jarkko Nieminen | 6–1, 6–4 |
| 2004 | (Russia) Nikolay Davydenko | (Netherlands) Martin Verkerk | 6–4, 7–5 |
| 2005 | (Argentina) David Nalbandian | (Romania) Andrei Pavel | 6–4, 6–1 |
| 2006 | (Belgium) Olivier Rochus | (Belgium) Kristof Vliegen | 6–4, 6–2 |
| 2007 | (Germany) Philipp Kohlschreiber | (Russia) Mikhail Youzhny | 2–6, 6–3, 6–4 |
| 2008 | (Chile) Fernando González | (Italy) Simone Bolelli | 7–6^{(7–4)}, 6–7^{(4–7)}, 6–3 |
| 2009 | (Czech Republic) Tomáš Berdych | (Russia) Mikhail Youzhny | 6–4, 4–6, 7–6^{(7–5)} |
| 2010 | (Russia) Mikhail Youzhny | (Croatia) Marin Čilić | 6–3, 4–6, 6–4 |
| 2011 | (Russia) Nikolay Davydenko | (Germany) Florian Mayer | 6–3, 3–6, 6–1 |
| 2012 | (Germany) Philipp Kohlschreiber | (Croatia) Marin Čilić | 7–6^{(10–8)}, 6–3 |
| 2013 | (Germany) Tommy Haas | (Germany) Philipp Kohlschreiber | 6–3, 7–6^{(7–3)} |
| 2014 | (Slovakia) Martin Kližan | (Italy) Fabio Fognini | 2–6, 6–1, 6–2 |
| 2015 | (United Kingdom) Andy Murray | (Germany) Philipp Kohlschreiber | 7–6^{(7–4)}, 5–7, 7–6^{(7–4)} |
| 2016 | (Germany) Philipp Kohlschreiber | (Austria) Dominic Thiem | 7–6^{(9–7)}, 4–6, 7–6^{(7–4)} |
| 2017 | (Germany) Alexander Zverev | (Argentina) Guido Pella | 6–4, 6–3 |
| 2018 | (Germany) Alexander Zverev | (Germany) Philipp Kohlschreiber | 6–3, 6–3 |
| 2019 | (Chile) Cristian Garín | (Italy) Matteo Berrettini | 6–1, 3–6, 7–6^{(7–1)} |
| 2020 | Not held due to COVID-19 | | |
| 2021 | (Georgia (country)) Nikoloz Basilashvili | (Germany) Jan-Lennard Struff | 6–4, 7–6^{(7–5)} |
| 2022 | (Denmark) Holger Rune | (Netherlands) Botic van de Zandschulp | 3–4, retired |
| 2023 | (Denmark) Holger Rune | (Netherlands) Botic van de Zandschulp | 6–4, 1–6, 7–6^{(7–3)} |
| 2024 | (Germany) Jan-Lennard Struff | (United States) Taylor Fritz | 7–5, 6–3 |
↓ ATP Tour 500 ↓
| 2025 | (Germany) Alexander Zverev | (United States) Ben Shelton | 6–2, 6–4 |
| 2026 | (United States) Ben Shelton | (Italy) Flavio Cobolli | 6–2, 7–5 |

=== Men's doubles (since 1974) ===
| Year | Champions | Runners-up | Score |
|---|---|---|---|
| 1974 | (Spain) Antonio Muñoz (Spain) Manuel Orantes | (West Germany) Jürgen Fassbender (West Germany) Hans-Jürgen Pohmann | 2–6, 6–4, 7–6, 6–2 |
| 1975 | (Poland) Wojciech Fibak (Czechoslovakia) Jan Kodeš | (Czechoslovakia) Milan Holeček (West Germany) Karl Meiler | 7–5, 6–3 |
| 1976 | (Spain) Juan Gisbert (Spain) Manuel Orantes | (Germany) Jürgen Fassbender (Germany) Hans-Jürgen Pohmann | 1–6, 6–3, 6–2, 2–3, retired |
| 1977 | (Czechoslovakia) František Pála (Hungary) Balázs Taróczy | (Socialist Federal Republic of Yugoslavia) Nikki Spear (United States) John Whitlinger | 6–3, 6–4 |
| 1978 | (Romania) Ion Țiriac (Argentina) Guillermo Vilas | (West Germany) Jürgen Fassbender (Netherlands) Tom Okker | 3–6, 6–4, 7–6 |
| 1979 | (Poland) Wojciech Fibak (Netherlands) Tom Okker | (West Germany) Jürgen Fassbender (France) Jean-Louis Haillet | 7–6, 7–5 |
| 1980 | (Switzerland) Heinz Günthardt (South Africa) Bob Hewitt | (Australia) David Carter (New Zealand) Chris Lewis | 7–6, 6–1 |
| 1981 | (Australia) David Carter (Australia) Paul Kronk | (United States) Eric Fromm (Israel) Shlomo Glickstein | 6–3, 6–4 |
| 1982 | (United States) Chip Hooper (United States) Mel Purcell | (South Africa) Tian Viljoen (South Africa) Danie Visser | 6–4, 7–6 |
| 1983 | (New Zealand) Chris Lewis (Czechoslovakia) Pavel Složil | (Sweden) Anders Järryd (Czechoslovakia) Tomáš Šmíd | 6–4, 6–2 |
| 1984 | (West Germany) Boris Becker (Poland) Wojciech Fibak | (United States) Eric Fromm (Romania) Florin Segărceanu | 6–4, 4–6, 6–1 |
| 1985 | (Australia) Mark Edmondson (Australia) Kim Warwick | (Spain) Sergio Casal (Spain) Emilio Sánchez | 4–6, 7–5, 7–5 |
| 1986 | (Spain) Sergio Casal (Spain) Emilio Sánchez | (Australia) Broderick Dyke (Australia) Wally Masur | 6–3, 4–6, 6–3 |
| 1987 | (United States) Jim Pugh (United States) Blaine Willenborg | (Spain) Sergio Casal (Spain) Emilio Sánchez | 7–6, 4–6, 6–4 |
| 1988 | (United States) Rick Leach (United States) Jim Pugh | (Argentina) Alberto Mancini (Argentina) Christian Miniussi | 7–6, 6–1 |
| 1989 | (Spain) Javier Sánchez (Hungary) Balázs Taróczy | (Australia) Peter Doohan (Australia) Laurie Warder | 7–6, 6–3 |
↓ ATP Tour 250 ↓
| 1990 | (West Germany) Udo Riglewski (West Germany) Michael Stich | (Czechoslovakia) Petr Korda (Czechoslovakia) Tomáš Šmíd | 6–1, 6–4 |
| 1991 | (United States) Patrick Galbraith (United States) Todd Witsken | (Sweden) Anders Järryd (South Africa) Danie Visser | 7–5, 6–4 |
| 1992 | (South Africa) David Adams (Netherlands) Menno Oosting | (Australia) Carl Limberger (Czechoslovakia) Tomáš Anzari | 3–6, 7–5, 6–3 |
| 1993 | (Czech Republic) Martin Damm (Sweden) Henrik Holm | (Czech Republic) Karel Nováček (Germany) Carl-Uwe Steeb | 6–0, 3–6, 7–5 |
| 1994 | (Russia) Yevgeny Kafelnikov (Czech Republic) David Rikl | (Germany) Boris Becker (Czech Republic) Petr Korda | 7–6, 7–5 |
| 1995 | (United States) Trevor Kronemann (Australia) David Macpherson | (Argentina) Luis Lobo (Spain) Javier Sánchez | 6–3, 6–4 |
| 1996 | (South Africa) Lan Bale (Netherlands) Stephen Noteboom | (France) Olivier Delaître (Italy) Diego Nargiso | 4–6, 7–6, 6–4 |
| 1997 | (Argentina) Pablo Albano (Spain) Àlex Corretja | (Germany) Karsten Braasch (Germany) Jens Knippschild | 3–6, 7–5, 6–2 |
| 1998 | (Australia) Todd Woodbridge (Australia) Mark Woodforde | (Australia) Joshua Eagle (Australia) Andrew Florent | 6–0, 6–3 |
| 1999 | (Argentina) Daniel Orsanic (Argentina) Mariano Puerta | (Italy) Massimo Bertolini (Italy) Cristian Brandi | 7–6, 3–6, 7–6 |
| 2000 | (South Africa) David Adams (South Africa) John-Laffnie de Jager | (Belarus) Max Mirnyi (Socialist Federal Republic of Yugoslavia) Nenad Zimonjić | 6–4, 6–4 |
| 2001 | (Czech Republic) Petr Luxa (Czech Republic) Radek Štěpánek | (Brazil) Jaime Oncins (Argentina) Daniel Orsanic | 5–7, 6–2, 7–6 |
| 2002 | (Czech Republic) Petr Luxa (Czech Republic) Radek Štěpánek | (Czech Republic) Petr Pála (Czech Republic) Pavel Vízner | 6–0, 6–7, [11–9] |
| 2003 | (Zimbabwe) Wayne Black (Zimbabwe) Kevin Ullyett | (Australia) Joshua Eagle (United States) Jared Palmer | 6–3, 7–5 |
| 2004 | (United States) James Blake (The Bahamas) Mark Merklein | (Austria) Julian Knowle (Serbia and Montenegro) Nenad Zimonjić | 6–2, 6–4 |
| 2005 | (Croatia) Mario Ančić (Austria) Julian Knowle | (Germany) Florian Mayer (Germany) Alexander Waske | 6–3, 1–6, 6–3 |
| 2006 | (Romania) Andrei Pavel (Germany) Alexander Waske | (Austria) Alexander Peya (Germany) Björn Phau | 6–4, 6–2 |
| 2007 | (Germany) Philipp Kohlschreiber (Russia) Mikhail Youzhny | (Czech Republic) Jan Hájek (Czech Republic) Jaroslav Levinský | 6–1, 6–4 |
| 2008 | (Germany) Michael Berrer (Germany) Rainer Schüttler | (United States) Scott Lipsky (United States) David Martin | 7–5, 3–6, [10–8] |
| 2009 | (Czech Republic) Jan Hernych (Czech Republic) Ivo Minář | (Australia) Ashley Fisher (Australia) Jordan Kerr | 6–4, 6–4 |
| 2010 | (Austria) Oliver Marach (Spain) Santiago Ventura | (United States) Eric Butorac (Germany) Michael Kohlmann | 5–7, 6–3, [16–14] |
| 2011 | (Italy) Simone Bolelli (Argentina) Horacio Zeballos | (Germany) Andreas Beck (Germany) Christopher Kas | 7–6^{(7–3)}, 6–4 |
| 2012 | (Czech Republic) František Čermák (Slovakia) Filip Polášek | (Belgium) Xavier Malisse (Belgium) Dick Norman | 6–4, 7–5 |
| 2013 | (Finland) Jarkko Nieminen (Russia) Dmitry Tursunov | (Cyprus) Marcos Baghdatis (United States) Eric Butorac | 6–1, 6–4 |
| 2014 | (United Kingdom) Jamie Murray (Australia) John Peers | (United Kingdom) Colin Fleming (United Kingdom) Ross Hutchins | 6–4, 6–2 |
| 2015 | (Austria) Alexander Peya (Brazil) Bruno Soares | (Germany) Alexander Zverev (Germany) Mischa Zverev | 4–6, 6–1, [10–5] |
| 2016 | (Finland) Henri Kontinen (Australia) John Peers | (Colombia) Juan Sebastián Cabal (Colombia) Robert Farah | 6–3, 3–6, [10–7] |
| 2017 | (Colombia) Juan Sebastián Cabal (Colombia) Robert Farah | (France) Jérémy Chardy (France) Fabrice Martin | 6–3, 6–3 |
| 2018 | (Croatia) Ivan Dodig (United States) Rajeev Ram | (Croatia) Nikola Mektić (Austria) Alexander Peya | 6–3, 7–5 |
| 2019 | (Denmark) Frederik Nielsen (Germany) Tim Pütz | (Brazil) Marcelo Demoliner (India) Divij Sharan | 6–4, 6–2 |
| 2020 | Not held due to COVID-19 | | |
| 2021 | (Germany) Kevin Krawietz (Netherlands) Wesley Koolhof | (Belgium) Sander Gillé (Belgium) Joran Vliegen | 4–6, 6–4, [10–5] |
| 2022 | (Germany) Kevin Krawietz (Germany) Andreas Mies | (Brazil) Rafael Matos (Spain) David Vega Hernández | 4–6, 6–4, [10–7] |
| 2023 | (Austria) Alexander Erler (Austria) Lucas Miedler | (Germany) Kevin Krawietz (Germany) Tim Pütz | 6–3, 6–4 |
| 2024 | (India) Yuki Bhambri (France) Albano Olivetti | (Germany) Andreas Mies (Germany) Jan-Lennard Struff | 7–6^{(8–6)}, 7–6^{(7–5)} |
↓ ATP Tour 500 ↓
| 2025 | (Sweden) André Göransson (Netherlands) Sem Verbeek | (Germany) Kevin Krawietz (Germany) Tim Pütz | 6–4, 6–4 |
| 2026 | (Germany) Jakob Schnaitter (Germany) Mark Wallner | (France) Théo Arribagé (France) Albano Olivetti | 6–4, 6–7^{(4–7)}, [12–10] |

== See also ==
- Munich WCT
- List of tennis tournaments
