= Jürgen Fassbender =

German tennis player

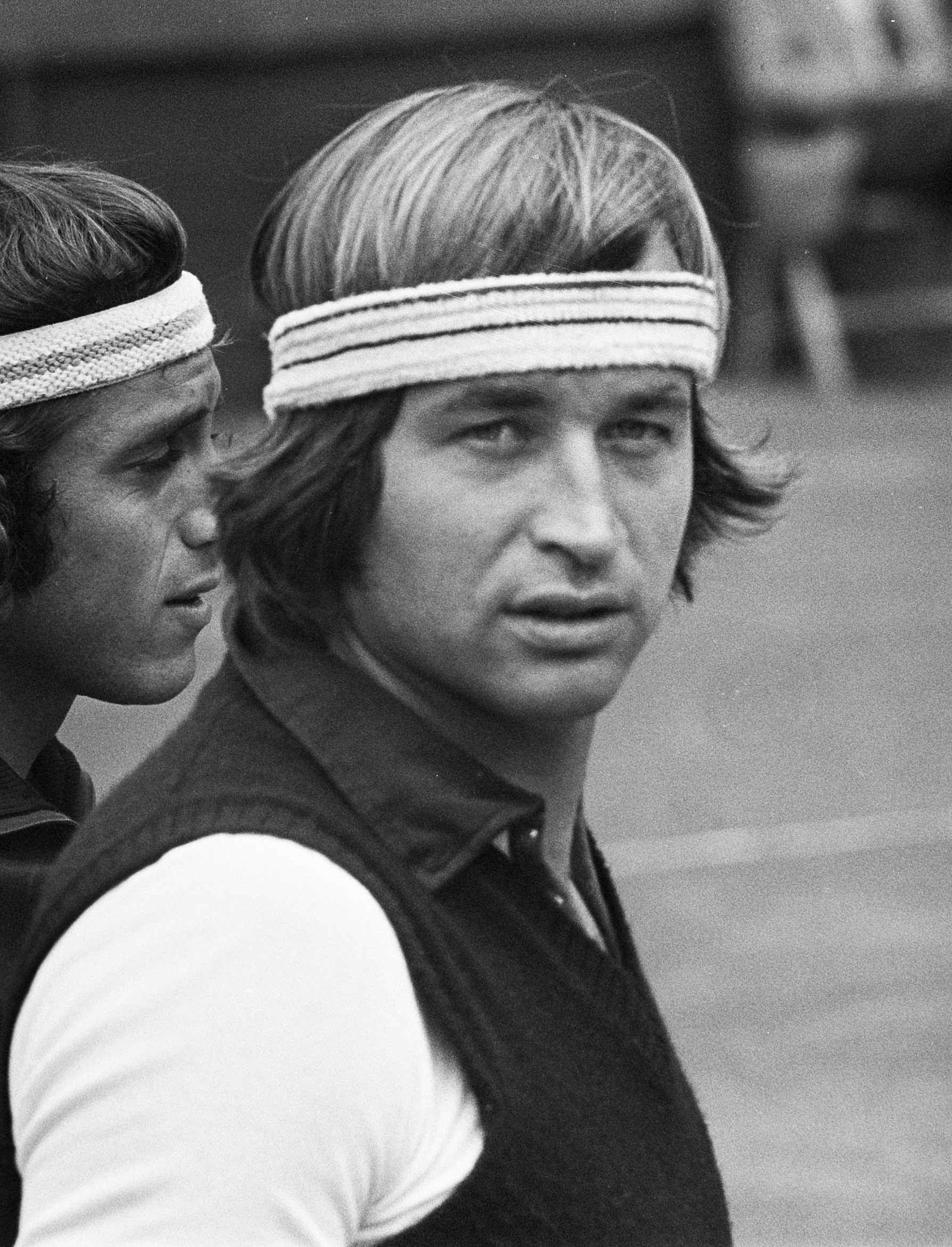
- Jürgen Fassbender in 1975
- Country (sports): West Germany
- Born: 28 May 1948 (age 78) Wesseling, Allied-occupied Germany
- Retired: 1981
- Plays: Right-handed

Singles
- Career record: 185–170
- Career titles: 3
- Highest ranking: No. 31 (23 August 1973)

Grand Slam singles results
- French Open: 3R (1973, 1974)
- Wimbledon: QF (1973)
- US Open: 2R (1972)

Other tournaments
- Olympic Games: 1R (1968, demonstration)

Doubles
- Career record: 250–129
- Career titles: 16
- Highest ranking: No. 22 (1 March 1976)

Grand Slam doubles results
- French Open: SF (1973)
- Wimbledon: SF (1973, 1975)
- US Open: 3R (1975)

Other doubles tournaments
- Tour Finals: RR – 2nd (1975)

Other mixed doubles tournaments
- Olympic Games: F (1968, demonstration)

Jürgen Fassbender (German: Faßbender, born 28 May 1948) is a retired German tennis player.

On the ATP Tour, Fassbender won three singles and 15 doubles titles. His best Grand Slam singles result was reaching the quarterfinals at the 1973 Wimbledon Championships. In doubles, he reached the semifinals of the 1973 French Open and the 1973 and 1975 Wimbledon Championships.

Between 1968 and 1979, he played in 23 ties for the German Davis Cup team and compiled a record of 20 wins and 14 losses. Best team result was winning the European Zone and reaching the Inter-Zonal semifinal in 1968.

== Career finals ==
=== Singles: 6 (3 titles / 3 runner-ups) ===
Result	W–L	Date	Tournament	Surface	Opponent	Score
Loss	0–1	Jul 1972	Düsseldorf, Germany	Clay	(Romania) Ilie Năstase	0–6, 2–6, 1–6
Win	1–1	Mar 1973	Charleston, United States	Carpet (i)	(United States) Clark Graebner	4–6, 6–1, 6–4
Loss	1–2	Mar 1974	Paramus, United States	Carpet (i)	(United States) Sandy Mayer	1–6, 3–6
Win	2–2	May 1974	Munich, Germany	Clay	(France) François Jauffret	6–2, 5–7, 6–1, 6–4
Loss	2–3	Feb 1975	Boca Raton, United States	Hard	(United States) Jimmy Connors	4–6, 2–6
Win	3–3	Mar 1975	Düsseldorf, Germany	Hard (i)	(Belgium) Bernard Mignot	6–3, 6–3, 6–4

=== Doubles: 35 (16 titles / 19 runner-ups) ===
Result	W–L	Date	Tournament	Surface	Partner	Opponents	Score
Win	1–0	Aug 1968	Kitzbühel, Austria	Clay	(West Germany) Wilhelm Bungert	(United Kingdom) Gerald Battrick (United Kingdom) Bobby Wilson	6–3, 7–5
Loss	1–1	Aug 1969	Hamburg, Germany	Clay	(France) Jean-Claude Barclay	(Netherlands) Tom Okker (United States) Marty Riessen	1–6, 2–6, 4–6
Loss	1–2	Jun 1972	London Queen's Club, UK	Grass	(West Germany) Karl Meiler	(United States) Jim McManus (United States) Jim Osborne	6–4, 3–6, 5–7
Win	2–2	Jul 1972	Kitzbühel, Austria	Clay	(West Germany) Hans-Jürgen Pohmann	(Australia) Mal Anderson (Australia) Geoff Masters	7–6, 6–4, 6–4
Win	3–2	Jan 1973	Birmingham, United States	Hard	(South Africa) Pat Cramer	(United States) Clark Graebner (Romania) Ion Țiriac	6–4, 7–5
Loss	3–3	Feb 1973	Salisbury, United States	Hard (i)	(Spain) Juan Gisbert Sr.	(United States) Clark Graebner (Romania) Ilie Năstase	6–2, 4–6, 3–6
Win	4–3	Jun 1973	Hamburg, Germany	Clay	(West Germany) Hans-Jürgen Pohmann	(Spain) Manuel Orantes (Romania) Ion Țiriac	7–6, 7–6, 7–6
Loss	4–4	Oct 1973	Manila, Philippines	Hard	(West Germany) Hans-Jürgen Pohmann	(Mexico) Marcello Lara (United States) Sherwood Stewart	2–6, 0–6
Loss	4–5	Nov 1973	Christchurch, New Zealand	Carpet (i)	(New Zealand) Jeff Simpson	(India) Anand Amritraj (United States) Fred McNair	w/o
Win	5–5	Jan 1974	Omaha, United States	Carpet (i)	(West Germany) Karl Meiler	(Australia) Ian Fletcher (Australia) Kim Warwick	6–2, 6–4
Win	6–5	Feb 1974	Baltimore, United States	Carpet (i)	(West Germany) Karl Meiler	(Australia) Owen Davidson (United States) Clark Graebner	7–6, 7–5
Win	7–5	Feb 1974	Little Rock, United States	Carpet (i)	(West Germany) Karl Meiler	(United States) Vitas Gerulaitis (South Africa) Bob Hewitt	6–0, 6–2
Win	8–5	Mar 1974	Calgary, Canada	Hard (i)	(West Germany) Karl Meiler	(Colombia) Iván Molina (Colombia) Jairo Velasco Sr.	6–4, 6–4
Win	9–5	Mar 1974	Tempe, Arizona	Hard	(West Germany) Karl Meiler	(Australia) Ian Fletcher (Australia) Kim Warwick	4–6, 6–4, 7–5
Loss	9–6	May 1974	Munich, Germany	Clay	(West Germany) Hans-Jürgen Pohmann	(Spain) Antonio Muñoz (Spain) Manuel Orantes	6–2, 4–6, 6–7, 2–6
Win	10–6	May 1974	Hamburg, Germany	Clay	(West Germany) Hans-Jürgen Pohmann	(United States) Brian Gottfried (Mexico) Raúl Ramírez	6–3, 6–4, 6–4
Loss	10–7	Aug 1974	Indianapolis, United States	Clay	(West Germany) Hans-Jürgen Pohmann	(United States) Jimmy Connors (Romania) Ilie Năstase	7–6, 3–6, 4–6
Loss	10–8	Aug 1974	Montreal, Canada	Hard	(West Germany) Hans-Jürgen Pohmann	(Spain) Manuel Orantes (Argentina) Guillermo Vilas	1–6, 6–2, 2–6
Loss	10–9	Nov 1974	Jakarta, Indonesia	Hard	(West Germany) Hans-Jürgen Pohmann	(Egypt) Ismail El Shafei (United States) Roscoe Tanner	5–7, 3–6
Win	11–9	Jan 1975	Birmingham, United States	Carpet (i)	(West Germany) Karl Meiler	(United Kingdom) Colin Dowdeswell (South Africa) John Yuill	6–1, 3–6, 7–6
Loss	11–10	Feb 1975	Boca Raton, United States	Hard	(Romania) Ion Țiriac	(Spain) Juan Gisbert Sr. (United States) Clark Graebner	2–6, 1–6
Loss	11–11	Mar 1975	London WCT, UK	Carpet (i)	(West Germany) Hans-Jürgen Pohmann	(Italy) Paolo Bertolucci (Italy) Adriano Panatta	3–6, 4–6
Win	12–11	Jul 1975	Gstaad, Switzerland	Clay	(West Germany) Hans-Jürgen Pohmann	(United Kingdom) Colin Dowdeswell (Australia) Ken Rosewall	6–4, 9–7, 6–1
Loss	12–12	Aug 1975	Columbus, United States	Hard	(West Germany) Hans-Jürgen Pohmann	(United States) Bob Lutz (United States) Stan Smith	2–6, 7–6, 3–6
Loss	12–13	Nov 1975	Buenos Aires, Argentina	Clay	(West Germany) Hans-Jürgen Pohmann	(Italy) Paolo Bertolucci (Italy) Adriano Panatta	6–7, 7–6, 4–6
Loss	12–14	May 1976	Munich, Germany	Clay	(West Germany) Hans-Jürgen Pohmann	(Spain) Juan Gisbert Sr. (Spain) Manuel Orantes	6–1, 3–6, 2–6, 3–2 ret.
Loss	12–15	Jun 1976	Berlin, Germany	Hard	(West Germany) Hans-Jürgen Pohmann	(Chile) Patricio Cornejo (Spain) Antonio Muñoz	5–7, 1–6
Win	13–15	Jul 1976	Gstaad, Switzerland	Clay	(West Germany) Hans-Jürgen Pohmann	(Italy) Paolo Bertolucci (Italy) Adriano Panatta	7–5, 6–3, 6–3
Loss	13–16	Jul 1976	Kitzbühel, Austria	Clay	(West Germany) Hans-Jürgen Pohmann	(Czechoslovakia) Jiří Hřebec (Czechoslovakia) Jan Kodeš	7–6, 2–6, 4–6
Win	14–16	May 1977	Düsseldorf, Germany	Clay	(West Germany) Karl Meiler	(Australia) Paul Kronk (Australia) Cliff Letcher	6–3, 6–3
Win	15–16	Jul 1977	Gstaad, Switzerland	Clay	(West Germany) Karl Meiler	(United Kingdom) Colin Dowdeswell (South Africa) Bob Hewitt	6–4, 7–6
Loss	15–17	Mar 1978	Lagos, Nigeria	Clay	(United Kingdom) Colin Dowdeswell	(United States) George Hardie (India) Sashi Menon	3–6, 6–3, 5–7
Loss	15–18	May 1978	Munich, Germany	Clay	(Netherlands) Tom Okker	(Romania) Ion Țiriac (Argentina) Guillermo Vilas	6–3, 4–6, 6–7
Win	16–18	Jun 1978	Berlin, Germany	Clay	(United Kingdom) Colin Dowdeswell	(Socialist Federal Republic of Yugoslavia) Željko Franulović (Chile) Hans Gildemeister	6–3, 6–4
Loss	16–19	May 1979	Munich, Germany	Clay	(France) Jean-Louis Haillet	(Poland) Wojciech Fibak (Netherlands) Tom Okker	6–7, 5–7
