= 1973 Grand Prix (tennis) =

Tennis competition

1973 Grand Prix circuit
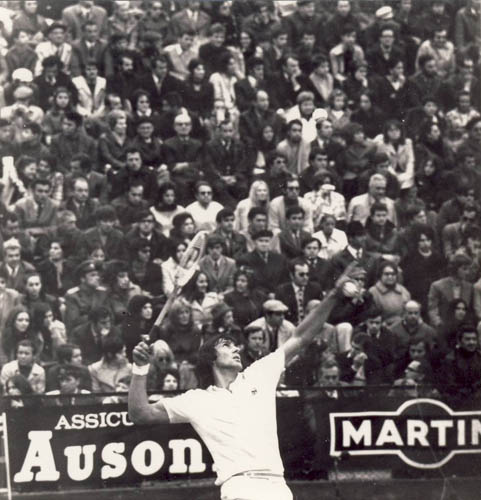
- Ilie Năstase finished the year as the inaugural ATP world No. 1. He won 14 titles during the season, including a major at the French Open, as well as the Masters Grand Prix.

Details
- Duration: 3 January 1973 – 26 December 1973
- Edition: 4th
- Tournaments: 72
- Categories: Group AA (3); Masters (1); Group A (11); Group B (19); Group C (18)

Achievements (singles)
- Most titles: (Romania) Ilie Năstase (14)
- Most finals: (Romania) Ilie Năstase (17)
- Prize money leader: (Romania) Ilie Năstase
- Points leader: (Romania) Ilie Năstase

The 1973 Commercial Union Assurance Grand Prix was a tennis circuit administered by the International Lawn Tennis Federation (ILTF) which served as a forerunner to the current Association of Tennis Professionals (ATP) World Tour and the Women's Tennis Association (WTA) Tour. The circuit consisted of the four modern Grand Slam tournaments and open tournaments recognised by the ILTF. Bonus points were awarded to players who were nominated to play in certain 1973 Davis Cup ties and who missed tournaments through competing in those ties. The Commercial Union Assurance Masters is included in this calendar but did not count towards the Grand Prix.

== Schedule ==
Key

AA events
Grand Prix Masters
A events
B events
C events
Team events

=== December 1972 ===
Week	Tournament	Champions	Runners-up	Semifinalists	Quarterfinalists
26 Dec	Australian Open; Melbourne, Australia; Grand Slam – Group A Grass – $27,450 – 56S/32D; Singles – Doubles	(Australia) John Newcombe; 6–3, 6–7, 7–5, 6–1	(New Zealand) Onny Parun	(West Germany) Karl Meiler (France) Patrick Proisy	(France) Wanaro N'Godrella (Soviet Union) Alex Metreveli (Australia) John Cooper (Australia) Bob Carmichael
26 Dec	Australian Open; Melbourne, Australia; Grand Slam – Group A Grass – $27,450 – 56S/32D; Singles – Doubles	(Australia) Mal Anderson (Australia) John Newcombe; 6–3, 6–4, 7–6	(Australia) John Alexander (Australia) Phil Dent	(West Germany) Karl Meiler (France) Patrick Proisy	(France) Wanaro N'Godrella (Soviet Union) Alex Metreveli (Australia) John Cooper (Australia) Bob Carmichael

=== May ===
Week	Tournament	Champions	Runners-up	Semifinalists	Quarterfinalists
7 May	Rothmans British Hard Court Championships; Bournemouth, Great Britain; Group B Clay – 64S/32D/32XD	(Italy) Adriano Panatta; 6–8, 7–5, 6–3, 8–6	(Romania) Ilie Năstase	(Australia) Barry Phillips-Moore (Australia) Ross Case	(Australia) Geoff Masters (United Kingdom) Buster Mottram (France) François Jauffret (France) Patrice Dominguez
7 May	Rothmans British Hard Court Championships; Bournemouth, Great Britain; Group B Clay – 64S/32D/32XD	(Spain) Juan Gisbert Sr. (Romania) Ilie Năstase; 6–4, 8–6	(Italy) Adriano Panatta (Romania) Ion Țiriac	(Australia) Barry Phillips-Moore (Australia) Ross Case	(Australia) Geoff Masters (United Kingdom) Buster Mottram (France) François Jauffret (France) Patrice Dominguez
7 May	Rothmans British Hard Court Championships; Bournemouth, Great Britain; Group B Clay – 64S/32D/32XD	(United Kingdom) Virginia Wade (South Africa) Frew McMillan; 6–2, 6–3	(South Africa) Ilana Kloss (South Africa) Bernard Mitton	(Australia) Barry Phillips-Moore (Australia) Ross Case	(Australia) Geoff Masters (United Kingdom) Buster Mottram (France) François Jauffret (France) Patrice Dominguez
21 May	French Open; Paris, France; Grand Slam – Group AA; Clay – 128S/64D/32XD; Singles – Doubles – Mixed doubles	(Romania) Ilie Năstase; 6–3, 6–3, 6–0	(Socialist Federal Republic of Yugoslavia) Nikola Pilić	(Italy) Adriano Panatta (United States) Tom Gorman	(Netherlands) Tom Okker (Italy) Paolo Bertolucci (Czechoslovakia) Jan Kodeš (United Kingdom) Roger Taylor
21 May	French Open; Paris, France; Grand Slam – Group AA; Clay – 128S/64D/32XD; Singles – Doubles – Mixed doubles	(Australia) John Newcombe (Netherlands) Tom Okker; 6–1, 3–6, 6–3, 5–7, 6–4	(United States) Jimmy Connors (Romania) Ilie Năstase	(Italy) Adriano Panatta (United States) Tom Gorman	(Netherlands) Tom Okker (Italy) Paolo Bertolucci (Czechoslovakia) Jan Kodeš (United Kingdom) Roger Taylor
21 May	French Open; Paris, France; Grand Slam – Group AA; Clay – 128S/64D/32XD; Singles – Doubles – Mixed doubles	(France) Françoise Dürr (France) Jean-Claude Barclay; 6–1, 6–4	(Netherlands) Betty Stöve (France) Patrice Dominguez	(Italy) Adriano Panatta (United States) Tom Gorman	(Netherlands) Tom Okker (Italy) Paolo Bertolucci (Czechoslovakia) Jan Kodeš (United Kingdom) Roger Taylor

=== June ===
Week	Tournament	Champions	Runners-up	Semifinalists	Quarterfinalists
4 Jun	Italian Open; Rome, Italy; Group A Clay – $101,600 – 96S/48D	(Romania) Ilie Năstase; 6–1, 6–1, 6–1	(Spain) Manuel Orantes	(Netherlands) Tom Okker (Italy) Paolo Bertolucci	(United States) Stan Smith (Hungary) Péter Szőke (Czechoslovakia) Jiří Hřebec (Czechoslovakia) Jan Kodeš
4 Jun	Italian Open; Rome, Italy; Group A Clay – $101,600 – 96S/48D	(Australia) John Newcombe (Netherlands) Tom Okker; 6–3, 6–2, 6–4	(Australia) Ross Case (Australia) Geoff Masters	(Netherlands) Tom Okker (Italy) Paolo Bertolucci	(United States) Stan Smith (Hungary) Péter Szőke (Czechoslovakia) Jiří Hřebec (Czechoslovakia) Jan Kodeš
4 Jun	Berlin Open; Berlin, West Germany; Group C Clay – 32S/16D	(West Germany) Hans-Jürgen Pohmann; 6–3, 3–6, 6–3, 6–3	(West Germany) Karl Meiler	(West Germany) Jürgen Fassbender (United States) Eddie Dibbs	(West Germany) Attila Korpás (West Germany) Ulrich Pinner (West Germany) Harald Elschenbroich (Belgium) Bernard Mignot
4 Jun	Berlin Open; Berlin, West Germany; Group C Clay – 32S/16D	(West Germany) Jürgen Fassbender (West Germany) Hans-Jürgen Pohmann; 4–6, 6–4, 6–4	(Mexico) Raúl Ramírez (Mexico) Joaquín Loyo-Mayo	(West Germany) Jürgen Fassbender (United States) Eddie Dibbs	(West Germany) Attila Korpás (West Germany) Ulrich Pinner (West Germany) Harald Elschenbroich (Belgium) Bernard Mignot
11 Jun	German Open; Hamburg, West Germany; Group B Clay – 62S/28D	(United States) Eddie Dibbs; 6–1, 3–6, 7–6, 6–3	(West Germany) Karl Meiler	(Chile) Jaime Fillol (West Germany) Jürgen Fassbender	(United States) Paul Gerken (West Germany) Harald Elschenbroich (Czechoslovakia) Jiří Hřebec (Italy) Martin Mulligan
11 Jun	German Open; Hamburg, West Germany; Group B Clay – 62S/28D	(West Germany) Jürgen Fassbender (West Germany) Hans-Jürgen Pohmann; 7–6, 7–6, 7–6	(Spain) Manuel Orantes (Romania) Ion Țiriac	(Chile) Jaime Fillol (West Germany) Jürgen Fassbender	(United States) Paul Gerken (West Germany) Harald Elschenbroich (Czechoslovakia) Jiří Hřebec (Italy) Martin Mulligan
11 Jun	John Player Open; Nottingham, Great Britain; Group B Grass – 40S/21D	(United States) Erik van Dillen; 3–6, 6–1, 6–1	(South Africa) Frew McMillan	(United States) Tom Gorman (United States) Jimmy Connors	(India) Jaidip Mukerjea (United Kingdom) Mark Cox (United States) Dick Stockton (United Kingdom) Stephen Warboys
11 Jun	John Player Open; Nottingham, Great Britain; Group B Grass – 40S/21D	(United States) Tom Gorman (United States) Erik van Dillen; 6–4, 6–4	(Australia) Bob Carmichael (South Africa) Frew McMillan	(United States) Tom Gorman (United States) Jimmy Connors	(India) Jaidip Mukerjea (United Kingdom) Mark Cox (United States) Dick Stockton (United Kingdom) Stephen Warboys
18 Jun	Rothmans Championships; London, Great Britain; Group C Grass – 48S/32D; Singles – Doubles	(Romania) Ilie Năstase; 9–8, 6–3	(United Kingdom) Roger Taylor	(Soviet Union) Alex Metreveli (Australia) Owen Davidson	(Egypt) Ismail El Shafei (West Germany) Jürgen Fassbender (Australia) John Newcombe (South Africa) Cliff Drysdale
18 Jun	Rothmans Championships; London, Great Britain; Group C Grass – 48S/32D; Singles – Doubles	(Netherlands) Tom Okker (United States) Marty Riessen; 6–4, 7–5	(Australia) Ray Keldie (South Africa) Raymond Moore	(Soviet Union) Alex Metreveli (Australia) Owen Davidson	(Egypt) Ismail El Shafei (West Germany) Jürgen Fassbender (Australia) John Newcombe (South Africa) Cliff Drysdale
18 Jun	Rothmans South of England Championships; Eastbourne, Great Britain; Group B Grass – 32S/16D	(United Kingdom) Mark Cox; 6–2, 2–6, 6–3	(France) Patrice Dominguez	(New Zealand) Onny Parun (Australia) Allan Stone	(United States) Paul Gerken (Spain) Andrés Gimeno (Australia) Ian Fletcher (United Kingdom) Graham Stilwell
18 Jun	Rothmans South of England Championships; Eastbourne, Great Britain; Group B Grass – 32S/16D	(Sweden) Ove Bengtson (United States) Jim McManus; 6–4, 4–6, 7–5	(Spain) Manuel Orantes (Romania) Ion Țiriac	(New Zealand) Onny Parun (Australia) Allan Stone	(United States) Paul Gerken (Spain) Andrés Gimeno (Australia) Ian Fletcher (United Kingdom) Graham Stilwell
25 Jun	Wimbledon Championships; London, Great Britain; Grand Slam – Group AA; Grass – 128S/64D/56XD; Singles – Doubles – Mixed doubles	(Czechoslovakia) Jan Kodeš; 6–1, 9–8^{(7–5)}, 6–3	(Soviet Union) Alex Metreveli	(United States) Sandy Mayer (United Kingdom) Roger Taylor	(West Germany) Jürgen Fassbender (United States) Jimmy Connors (Sweden) Björn Borg (India) Vijay Amritraj
25 Jun	Wimbledon Championships; London, Great Britain; Grand Slam – Group AA; Grass – 128S/64D/56XD; Singles – Doubles – Mixed doubles	(United States) Jimmy Connors (Romania) Ilie Năstase; 3–6, 6–3, 6–4, 8–9^{(3–7)}, 6–1	(Australia) John Cooper (Australia) Neale Fraser	(United States) Sandy Mayer (United Kingdom) Roger Taylor	(West Germany) Jürgen Fassbender (United States) Jimmy Connors (Sweden) Björn Borg (India) Vijay Amritraj
25 Jun	Wimbledon Championships; London, Great Britain; Grand Slam – Group AA; Grass – 128S/64D/56XD; Singles – Doubles – Mixed doubles	(United States) Billie Jean King (Australia) Owen Davidson; 6–3, 6–2	(United States) Janet Newberry (Mexico) Raúl Ramírez	(United States) Sandy Mayer (United Kingdom) Roger Taylor	(West Germany) Jürgen Fassbender (United States) Jimmy Connors (Sweden) Björn Borg (India) Vijay Amritraj

=== July ===
Week	Tournament	Champions	Runners-up	Semifinalists	Quarterfinalists
9 Jul	Swedish Open; Båstad, Sweden; Group B Clay – $50,000 – 32S/22D; Singles – Doubles	(United States) Stan Smith; 6–4, 6–2, 7–6	(Spain) Manuel Orantes	(Sweden) Björn Borg (Sweden) Leif Johansson	(Italy) Martin Mulligan (Chile) Jaime Pinto Bravo (Australia) Bob Carmichael (Italy) Antonio Zugarelli
9 Jul	Swedish Open; Båstad, Sweden; Group B Clay – $50,000 – 32S/22D; Singles – Doubles	(Socialist Federal Republic of Yugoslavia) Nikola Pilić (United States) Stan Smith; 2–6, 6–4, 6–4	(Australia) Bob Carmichael (South Africa) Frew McMillan	(Sweden) Björn Borg (Sweden) Leif Johansson	(Italy) Martin Mulligan (Chile) Jaime Pinto Bravo (Australia) Bob Carmichael (Italy) Antonio Zugarelli
9 Jul	Swiss Open; Gstaad, Switzerland; Group B Clay – 32S	(Romania) Ilie Năstase; 6–4, 6–3, 6–3	(Australia) Roy Emerson	(France) Patrick Proisy (West Germany) Karl Meiler	(New Zealand) Brian Fairlie (Australia) Allan Stone (United States) Sandy Mayer (Netherlands) Tom Okker
9 Jul	Green Shield Welsh Open; Newport, Great Britain; Group C Grass – 64S/32D	(United Kingdom) Roger Taylor; 9–8, 8–6	(Australia) Bob Giltinan	(United Kingdom) John Paish (New Zealand) Jeff Simpson	(South Africa) Terry Ryan (Australia) John Bartlett (South Africa) Byron Bertram (United States) Dick Bohrnstedt
9 Jul	Green Shield Welsh Open; Newport, Great Britain; Group C Grass – 64S/32D	Title shared.	(South Africa) Bertram / (Australia) Lloyd (Australia) Giltinan / (Australia) Keldie	(United Kingdom) John Paish (New Zealand) Jeff Simpson	(South Africa) Terry Ryan (Australia) John Bartlett (South Africa) Byron Bertram (United States) Dick Bohrnstedt
16 Jul	U.S. Professional Tennis Championships; Boston, United States; Group B Hard – 32S/16D; Singles	(United States) Jimmy Connors; 6–3, 4–6, 6–4, 3–6, 6–2	(United States) Arthur Ashe	(United States) Cliff Richey (United States) Clark Graebner	(United States) Dick Stockton (United States) Marty Riessen (Australia) John Alexander (United States) Roscoe Tanner
16 Jul	Austrian Open; Kitzbühel, Austria; Group C Clay – 32S/17D	Title shared.	(Mexico) Raúl Ramírez (Spain) Manuel Orantes	(Mexico) Marcelo Lara (Romania) Ion Țiriac	(Czechoslovakia) Vladimír Zedník (Brazil) José Edison Mandarino (Australia) Barry Phillips-Moore (Soviet Union) Vladimir Korotkov
16 Jul	Austrian Open; Kitzbühel, Austria; Group C Clay – 32S/17D	(United States) Jim McManus (Mexico) Raúl Ramírez; 6–2, 6–2, 6–3	(Brazil) José Edison Mandarino (Argentina) Tito Vázquez	(Mexico) Marcelo Lara (Romania) Ion Țiriac	(Czechoslovakia) Vladimír Zedník (Brazil) José Edison Mandarino (Australia) Barry Phillips-Moore (Soviet Union) Vladimir Korotkov
16 Jul	Dutch Open; Hilversum, the Netherlands; Group C Clay – 32S/16D; Singles	(Netherlands) Tom Okker; 2–6, 6–4, 6–4, 6–7, 6–3	(Spain) Andrés Gimeno	(Australia) Allan Stone (Australia) Geoff Masters	(France) Wanaro N'Godrella (West Germany) Attila Korpás (Australia) Ian Fletcher (Colombia) Iván Molina
16 Jul	Dutch Open; Hilversum, the Netherlands; Group C Clay – 32S/16D; Singles	(Colombia) Iván Molina (Australia) Allan Stone; 4–6, 7–6, 6–4	(Spain) Andrés Gimeno (Spain) Antonio Muñoz	(Australia) Allan Stone (Australia) Geoff Masters	(France) Wanaro N'Godrella (West Germany) Attila Korpás (Australia) Ian Fletcher (Colombia) Iván Molina
23 Jul	Washington Star International; Washington, United States; Group A Clay – $75,000 – 64S/32D	(United States) Arthur Ashe; 6–4, 6–2	(Netherlands) Tom Okker	(Chile) Jaime Fillol (United States) Tom Gorman	(United States) Paul Gerken (United States) Marty Riessen (Socialist Federal Republic of Yugoslavia) Nikola Pilić (United States) Dick Stockton
23 Jul	Washington Star International; Washington, United States; Group A Clay – $75,000 – 64S/32D	(Australia) Ross Case (Australia) Geoff Masters; 2–6, 6–4, 6–4	(Australia) Dick Crealy (Rhodesia) Andrew Pattison	(Chile) Jaime Fillol (United States) Tom Gorman	(United States) Paul Gerken (United States) Marty Riessen (Socialist Federal Republic of Yugoslavia) Nikola Pilić (United States) Dick Stockton
23 Jul	Volvo International; Bretton Woods, United States; Group C Clay – $25,000 – 32S/16D; Singles – Doubles	(India) Vijay Amritraj; 7–5, 2–6, 7–5	(United States) Jimmy Connors	(Australia) Ian Fletcher (Australia) John Alexander	(Australia) Bob Carmichael (United Kingdom) Gerald Battrick (United States) Tom Edlefsen (Australia) Rod Laver
23 Jul	Volvo International; Bretton Woods, United States; Group C Clay – $25,000 – 32S/16D; Singles – Doubles	(Australia) Rod Laver (Australia) Fred Stolle; 7–6, 4–6, 7–5	(Australia) Bob Carmichael (South Africa) Frew McMillan	(Australia) Ian Fletcher (Australia) John Alexander	(Australia) Bob Carmichael (United Kingdom) Gerald Battrick (United States) Tom Edlefsen (Australia) Rod Laver
30 Jul	First National Bank Classic; Louisville, United States; Group A Clay – $75,000 – 64S/32D	(Spain) Manuel Orantes; 3–6, 6–3, 6–4	(Australia) John Newcombe	(United States) Vitas Gerulaitis (Argentina) Guillermo Vilas	(Australia) Dick Crealy (Australia) Ross Case (Socialist Federal Republic of Yugoslavia) Nikola Pilić (Spain) Antonio Muñoz
30 Jul	First National Bank Classic; Louisville, United States; Group A Clay – $75,000 – 64S/32D	(Spain) Manuel Orantes (Romania) Ion Țiriac; 0–6, 6–4, 6–3	(United States) Clark Graebner (Australia) John Newcombe	(United States) Vitas Gerulaitis (Argentina) Guillermo Vilas	(Australia) Dick Crealy (Australia) Ross Case (Socialist Federal Republic of Yugoslavia) Nikola Pilić (Spain) Antonio Muñoz
30 Jul	Buckeye Championships; Columbus, United States; Group C Hard – $25,000 – 32S/16D	(United States) Jimmy Connors; 3–6, 6–3, 6–3	(United States) Charlie Pasarell	(United States) Paul Gerken (Pakistan) Haroon Rahim	(United States) Pancho Gonzales (Rhodesia) Andrew Pattison (Australia) Colin Dibley (United States) Brian Gottfried
30 Jul	Buckeye Championships; Columbus, United States; Group C Hard – $25,000 – 32S/16D	(United Kingdom) Gerald Battrick (United Kingdom) Graham Stilwell; 6–4, 7–6	(Australia) Colin Dibley (United States) Charlie Pasarell	(United States) Paul Gerken (Pakistan) Haroon Rahim	(United States) Pancho Gonzales (Rhodesia) Andrew Pattison (Australia) Colin Dibley (United States) Brian Gottfried

=== August ===
Week	Tournament	Champions	Runners-up	Semifinalists	Quarterfinalists
6 Aug	Western Championships; Cincinnati, United States; Group B Clay – $50,000 – 32S/16D	(Romania) Ilie Năstase; 5–7, 6–3, 6–4	(Spain) Manuel Orantes	(Socialist Federal Republic of Yugoslavia) Nikola Pilić (United States) Jimmy Connors	(Australia) John Alexander (Argentina) Guillermo Vilas (United States) Roscoe Tanner (France) Patrick Proisy
6 Aug	Western Championships; Cincinnati, United States; Group B Clay – $50,000 – 32S/16D	(Australia) John Alexander (Australia) Phil Dent; 1–6, 7–6, 7–6	(United States) Brian Gottfried (Mexico) Raúl Ramírez	(Socialist Federal Republic of Yugoslavia) Nikola Pilić (United States) Jimmy Connors	(Australia) John Alexander (Argentina) Guillermo Vilas (United States) Roscoe Tanner (France) Patrick Proisy
6 Aug	Tanglewood International Tennis Classic; Clemmons, United States; Group C Clay – 32S/16D	(Chile) Jaime Fillol; 6–2, 6–4	(United Kingdom) Gerald Battrick	(United States) Jeff Borowiak (India) Vijay Amritraj	(Australia) Ross Case (New Zealand) Brian Fairlie (France) Georges Goven (South Africa) Frew McMillan
6 Aug	Tanglewood International Tennis Classic; Clemmons, United States; Group C Clay – 32S/16D	(Australia) Bob Carmichael (South Africa) Frew McMillan; 6–3, 6–4	(New Zealand) Brian Fairlie (Egypt) Ismail El Shafei	(United States) Jeff Borowiak (India) Vijay Amritraj	(Australia) Ross Case (New Zealand) Brian Fairlie (France) Georges Goven (South Africa) Frew McMillan
13 Aug	U.S. Clay Court Championships; Indianapolis, United States; Group B Clay – $90,000 – 50S/22D	(Spain) Manuel Orantes; 6–4, 6–1, 6–4	(France) Georges Goven	(United States) Cliff Richey (Mexico) Raúl Ramírez	(United States) Brian Gottfried (United States) Roscoe Tanner (France) Patrick Proisy (Italy) Paolo Bertolucci
13 Aug	U.S. Clay Court Championships; Indianapolis, United States; Group B Clay – $90,000 – 50S/22D	(Australia) Bob Carmichael (South Africa) Frew McMillan; 6–3, 6–4	(Spain) Manuel Orantes (Romania) Ion Țiriac	(United States) Cliff Richey (Mexico) Raúl Ramírez	(United States) Brian Gottfried (United States) Roscoe Tanner (France) Patrick Proisy (Italy) Paolo Bertolucci
13 Aug	Pennsylvania Championships; Merion, United States; Group C Grass – 64S/32D	(United States) Mike Estep; 7–5, 3–6, 7–6, 3–6, 7–5	(United States) Gene Scott	(India) Vijay Amritraj (United States) Herb Fitzgibbon	(United States) Brian Teacher (Australia) Ian Fletcher (India) Anand Amritraj (France) Jean-Baptiste Chanfreau
13 Aug	Pennsylvania Championships; Merion, United States; Group C Grass – 64S/32D	(Australia) Colin Dibley (Australia) Allan Stone; 7–6, 6–3	(United States) Jeff Austin (United States) Fred McNair	(India) Vijay Amritraj (United States) Herb Fitzgibbon	(United States) Brian Teacher (Australia) Ian Fletcher (India) Anand Amritraj (France) Jean-Baptiste Chanfreau
20 Aug	Canadian Open; Toronto, Ontario, Canada; Group A Hard – $100,000 – 64S/32D; Singles – Doubles	(Netherlands) Tom Okker; 6–3, 6–2, 6–1	(Spain) Manuel Orantes	(South Africa) Cliff Drysdale (Colombia) Iván Molina	(Italy) Paolo Bertolucci (Sweden) Björn Borg (Australia) John Newcombe (United States) Arthur Ashe
20 Aug	Canadian Open; Toronto, Ontario, Canada; Group A Hard – $100,000 – 64S/32D; Singles – Doubles	(Australia) Rod Laver (Australia) Ken Rosewall; 7–5, 7–6	(Australia) Owen Davidson (Australia) John Newcombe	(South Africa) Cliff Drysdale (Colombia) Iván Molina	(Italy) Paolo Bertolucci (Sweden) Björn Borg (Australia) John Newcombe (United States) Arthur Ashe
20 Aug	Eastern Championships; South Orange, United States; Group C Grass – 32S/16D	(Australia) Colin Dibley; 6–4, 6–7, 6–4	(India) Vijay Amritraj	(United States) Pancho Gonzales (United States) Clark Graebner	(United States) Paul Gerken (United States) Dick Stockton (Romania) Ion Țiriac (New Zealand) Onny Parun
20 Aug	Eastern Championships; South Orange, United States; Group C Grass – 32S/16D	(United States) Jimmy Connors (Romania) Ilie Năstase; 6–7, 6–3, 6–2	(United States) Pancho Gonzales (United States) Tom Gorman	(United States) Pancho Gonzales (United States) Clark Graebner	(United States) Paul Gerken (United States) Dick Stockton (Romania) Ion Țiriac (New Zealand) Onny Parun
27 Aug	US Open; New York City, United States; Grand Slam – Group AA; Grass – $118,000–128S/62D/32XD; Singles – Doubles – Mixed doubles	(Australia) John Newcombe; 6–4, 1–6, 4–6, 6–2, 6–3	(Czechoslovakia) Jan Kodeš	(United States) Stan Smith (Australia) Ken Rosewall	(New Zealand) Onny Parun (Socialist Federal Republic of Yugoslavia) Nikola Pilić (India) Vijay Amritraj (United States) Jimmy Connors
27 Aug	US Open; New York City, United States; Grand Slam – Group AA; Grass – $118,000–128S/62D/32XD; Singles – Doubles – Mixed doubles	(Australia) Owen Davidson (Australia) John Newcombe; 7–5, 2–6, 7–5, 7–5	(Australia) Rod Laver (Australia) Ken Rosewall	(United States) Stan Smith (Australia) Ken Rosewall	(New Zealand) Onny Parun (Socialist Federal Republic of Yugoslavia) Nikola Pilić (India) Vijay Amritraj (United States) Jimmy Connors
27 Aug	US Open; New York City, United States; Grand Slam – Group AA; Grass – $118,000–128S/62D/32XD; Singles – Doubles – Mixed doubles	(United States) Billie Jean King (Australia) Owen Davidson; 6–3, 3–6, 7–6	(Australia) Margaret Court (United States) Marty Riessen	(United States) Stan Smith (Australia) Ken Rosewall	(New Zealand) Onny Parun (Socialist Federal Republic of Yugoslavia) Nikola Pilić (India) Vijay Amritraj (United States) Jimmy Connors

=== September ===
Week	Tournament	Champions	Runners-up	Semifinalists	Quarterfinalists
10 Sep	U.S. Hard Court Championships; Aptos, United States; Group C Hard – 32S/16D	(United States) Jeff Austin; 7–6, 6–4	(New Zealand) Onny Parun	(Pakistan) Haroon Rahim (United States) Dick Bohrnstedt	(United States) Tom Edlefsen (United States) Erik van Dillen (United Kingdom) John Lloyd (United States) Mike Machette
10 Sep	U.S. Hard Court Championships; Aptos, United States; Group C Hard – 32S/16D	(United States) Jeff Austin (United States) Fred McNair; 6–2, 6–1	(South Africa) Raymond Moore (New Zealand) Onny Parun	(Pakistan) Haroon Rahim (United States) Dick Bohrnstedt	(United States) Tom Edlefsen (United States) Erik van Dillen (United Kingdom) John Lloyd (United States) Mike Machette
10 Sep	Rainier International Tennis Classic; Seattle, United States; Group C Carpet (i) – $37,500 – 32S/16D; Singles – Doubles	(Netherlands) Tom Okker; 7–5, 6–4	(Australia) John Alexander	(United States) Tom Gorman (United States) Cliff Richey	(Denmark) Torben Ulrich (United Kingdom) Mark Cox (United States) Brian Gottfried (United States) Arthur Ashe
10 Sep	Rainier International Tennis Classic; Seattle, United States; Group C Carpet (i) – $37,500 – 32S/16D; Singles – Doubles	(United States) Tom Gorman (Netherlands) Tom Okker; 2–6, 6–4, 7–6	(Australia) Bob Carmichael (South Africa) Frew McMillan	(United States) Tom Gorman (United States) Cliff Richey	(Denmark) Torben Ulrich (United Kingdom) Mark Cox (United States) Brian Gottfried (United States) Arthur Ashe
17 Sep	Pacific Southwest Open; Los Angeles, United States; Group A Hard – $75,000 – 64S/32D; Singles – Doubles	(United States) Jimmy Connors; 7–5, 7–6^{(11–9)}	(Netherlands) Tom Okker	(Mexico) Raúl Ramírez (Romania) Ilie Năstase	(United States) Stan Smith (United States) Charlie Pasarell (Australia) Ken Rosewall (South Africa) Raymond Moore
17 Sep	Pacific Southwest Open; Los Angeles, United States; Group A Hard – $75,000 – 64S/32D; Singles – Doubles	(Czechoslovakia) Jan Kodeš (Czechoslovakia) Vladimír Zedník; 6–2, 6–4	(United States) Jimmy Connors (Romania) Ilie Năstase	(Mexico) Raúl Ramírez (Romania) Ilie Năstase	(United States) Stan Smith (United States) Charlie Pasarell (Australia) Ken Rosewall (South Africa) Raymond Moore
24 Sep	Pacific Coast Championships; San Francisco, United States; Group B Hard – $50,000 – 32S/16D; Singles – Doubles	(Australia) Roy Emerson; 5–7, 6–1, 6–4	(Sweden) Björn Borg	(South Africa) Raymond Moore (United States) Arthur Ashe	(United States) Stan Smith (United States) Tom Gorman (United States) Roscoe Tanner (Australia) John Alexander
24 Sep	Pacific Coast Championships; San Francisco, United States; Group B Hard – $50,000 – 32S/16D; Singles – Doubles	(Australia) Roy Emerson (United States) Stan Smith; 6–2, 6–1	(Sweden) Ove Bengtson (United States) Jim McManus	(South Africa) Raymond Moore (United States) Arthur Ashe	(United States) Stan Smith (United States) Tom Gorman (United States) Roscoe Tanner (Australia) John Alexander
24 Sep	Tam International; Chicago, United States; Group B Carpet (i) – 32S/16D	(Netherlands) Tom Okker; 3–6, 7–6, 6–3	(Australia) John Newcombe	(Romania) Ilie Năstase (United States) Marty Riessen	(United Kingdom) Graham Stilwell (United Kingdom) Gerald Battrick (United States) Eddie Dibbs (United States) Brian Gottfried
24 Sep	Tam International; Chicago, United States; Group B Carpet (i) – 32S/16D	(Australia) Owen Davidson (Australia) John Newcombe; 6–7, 7–6, 7–6	(United Kingdom) Gerald Battrick (United Kingdom) Graham Stilwell	(Romania) Ilie Năstase (United States) Marty Riessen	(United Kingdom) Graham Stilwell (United Kingdom) Gerald Battrick (United States) Eddie Dibbs (United States) Brian Gottfried

=== October ===
Week	Tournament	Champions	Runners-up	Semifinalists	Quarterfinalists
1 Oct	Fort Worth Open; Fort Worth, United States; Group B Hard – 32S/16D	(United States) Eddie Dibbs; 7–5, 6–2, 6–4	(United States) Brian Gottfried	(Chile) Jaime Fillol (United States) Roscoe Tanner	(Australia) Phil Dent (United States) Harold Solomon (Rhodesia) Andrew Pattison (Australia) John Newcombe
1 Oct	Fort Worth Open; Fort Worth, United States; Group B Hard – 32S/16D	(United States) Brian Gottfried (United States) Dick Stockton; 7–6, 6–4	(Australia) Owen Davidson (Australia) John Newcombe	(Chile) Jaime Fillol (United States) Roscoe Tanner	(Australia) Phil Dent (United States) Harold Solomon (Rhodesia) Andrew Pattison (Australia) John Newcombe
1 Oct	Quebec Open; Quebec, Canada; Group B 32S/16D	(United States) Jimmy Connors; 6–1, 6–1, 6–7, 6–0	(United States) Marty Riessen	(United Kingdom) Mark Cox (Sweden) Kjell Johansson	(New Zealand) Onny Parun (South Africa) Raymond Moore (United States) Clark Graebner (Sweden) Tenny Svensson
1 Oct	Quebec Open; Quebec, Canada; Group B 32S/16D	(Australia) Bob Carmichael (South Africa) Frew McMillan; 6–2, 7–6	(United States) Jimmy Connors (United States) Marty Riessen	(United Kingdom) Mark Cox (Sweden) Kjell Johansson	(New Zealand) Onny Parun (South Africa) Raymond Moore (United States) Clark Graebner (Sweden) Tenny Svensson
1 Oct	Osaka Open; Osaka, Japan; Group C Hard – 32S/16D	(Australia) Ken Rosewall; 6–2, 6–4	(Japan) Toshiro Sakai	(South Africa) Cliff Drysdale (Socialist Federal Republic of Yugoslavia) Željko Franulović	(Japan) Jun Kuki (Czechoslovakia) Milan Holeček (Australia) Paul Kronk (United States) Sherwood Stewart
1 Oct	Osaka Open; Osaka, Japan; Group C Hard – 32S/16D	(United States) Jeff Borowiak (United States) Tom Gorman; 6–4, 7–6	(Japan) Jun Kamiwazumi (Australia) Ken Rosewall	(South Africa) Cliff Drysdale (Socialist Federal Republic of Yugoslavia) Željko Franulović	(Japan) Jun Kuki (Czechoslovakia) Milan Holeček (Australia) Paul Kronk (United States) Sherwood Stewart
8 Oct	Trofeo Conde de Godó; Barcelona, Spain; Group A Clay – 58S/32D; Singles – Doubles	(Romania) Ilie Năstase; 2–6, 6–1, 8–6, 6–4	(Spain) Manuel Orantes	(Czechoslovakia) Jan Kodeš (Sweden) Björn Borg	(Spain) José Higueras (Australia) Barry Phillips-Moore (Rhodesia) Andrew Pattison (United Kingdom) Buster Mottram
8 Oct	Trofeo Conde de Godó; Barcelona, Spain; Group A Clay – 58S/32D; Singles – Doubles	(Romania) Ilie Năstase (Netherlands) Tom Okker; 4–6, 6–3, 6–2	(Spain) Antonio Muñoz (Spain) Manuel Orantes	(Czechoslovakia) Jan Kodeš (Sweden) Björn Borg	(Spain) José Higueras (Australia) Barry Phillips-Moore (Rhodesia) Andrew Pattison (United Kingdom) Buster Mottram
8 Oct	Japan Open Tennis Championships; Tokyo, Japan; Group B 48S/24D	(Australia) Ken Rosewall; 6–1, 6–4	(Australia) John Newcombe	(West Germany) Hans-Jürgen Pohmann (South Africa) Cliff Drysdale	(Australia) Colin Dibley (United States) Brian Gottfried (United States) Jeff Borowiak (Australia) Kim Warwick
8 Oct	Japan Open Tennis Championships; Tokyo, Japan; Group B 48S/24D	(Australia) Mal Anderson (Australia) Ken Rosewall; 7–5, 7–5	(Australia) Colin Dibley (Australia) Allan Stone	(West Germany) Hans-Jürgen Pohmann (South Africa) Cliff Drysdale	(Australia) Colin Dibley (United States) Brian Gottfried (United States) Jeff Borowiak (Australia) Kim Warwick
15 Oct	Trofeo Melia; Madrid, Spain; Group A Clay – 64S/31D	(Netherlands) Tom Okker; 4–6, 6–3, 6–3, 7–5	(Chile) Jaime Fillol	(Romania) Ilie Năstase (United Kingdom) Buster Mottram	(Socialist Federal Republic of Yugoslavia) Nikola Pilić (Spain) José Higueras (Australia) Rod Laver (France) Pierre Barthès
15 Oct	Trofeo Melia; Madrid, Spain; Group A Clay – 64S/31D	(Romania) Ilie Năstase (Netherlands) Tom Okker; 6–3, 6–0	(Australia) Bob Carmichael (South Africa) Frew McMillan	(Romania) Ilie Năstase (United Kingdom) Buster Mottram	(Socialist Federal Republic of Yugoslavia) Nikola Pilić (Spain) José Higueras (Australia) Rod Laver (France) Pierre Barthès
15 Oct	Indian Open; New Delhi, India; Group B 32S/16D	(India) Vijay Amritraj; 6–4, 5–7, 8–9, 6–3, 11–9	(Australia) Mal Anderson	(Mexico) Raúl Ramírez (United States) Mike Estep	(Australia) Ian Fletcher (Australia) Fred Stolle (United States) Paul Gerken (India) Jasjit Singh
15 Oct	Indian Open; New Delhi, India; Group B 32S/16D	(United States) Jim McManus (Mexico) Raúl Ramírez; 6–2, 6–4	(India) Anand Amritraj (India) Vijay Amritraj	(Mexico) Raúl Ramírez (United States) Mike Estep	(Australia) Ian Fletcher (Australia) Fred Stolle (United States) Paul Gerken (India) Jasjit Singh
15 Oct	Milo International Tennis Classic; Manila, the Philippines; Group C 32S/16D	(Australia) Ross Case; 6–1, 6–0	(Australia) Geoff Masters	(Australia) John Newcombe (Australia) Colin Dibley	(Czechoslovakia) Milan Holeček (West Germany) Jürgen Fassbender (West Germany) Hans-Jürgen Pohmann (Australia) Allan Stone
15 Oct	Milo International Tennis Classic; Manila, the Philippines; Group C 32S/16D	(Mexico) Marcelo Lara (United States) Sherwood Stewart; 4–6, 7–5, 7–6	(West Germany) Jürgen Fassbender (West Germany) Hans-Jürgen Pohmann	(Australia) John Newcombe (Australia) Colin Dibley	(Czechoslovakia) Milan Holeček (West Germany) Jürgen Fassbender (West Germany) Hans-Jürgen Pohmann (Australia) Allan Stone
22 Oct	Aryamehr Cup; Tehran, Iran; Group A Clay – 48S/21D	(Mexico) Raúl Ramírez; 6–7, 6–1, 7–5, 6–3	(Australia) John Newcombe	(Socialist Federal Republic of Yugoslavia) Željko Franulović (Australia) Rod Laver	(Romania) Ilie Năstase (Australia) Syd Ball (West Germany) Hans-Jürgen Pohmann (Australia) Bob Giltinan
22 Oct	Aryamehr Cup; Tehran, Iran; Group A Clay – 48S/21D	(Australia) Rod Laver (Australia) John Newcombe; 7–6, 6–2	(Australia) Ross Case (Australia) Geoff Masters	(Socialist Federal Republic of Yugoslavia) Željko Franulović (Australia) Rod Laver	(Romania) Ilie Năstase (Australia) Syd Ball (West Germany) Hans-Jürgen Pohmann (Australia) Bob Giltinan
22 Oct	Czechoslovakian Championships; Prague, Czechoslovakia; Group C Clay – 32S/16D	(Czechoslovakia) Jiří Hřebec; 4–6, 6–1, 3–6, 6–0, 7–5	(Czechoslovakia) Jan Kodeš	(Czechoslovakia) Jan Písecký (Sweden) Ove Bengtson	(Czechoslovakia) Vladimír Zedník (Czechoslovakia) František Pála (Australia) Barry Phillips-Moore (Sweden) Kjell Johansson
22 Oct	Czechoslovakian Championships; Prague, Czechoslovakia; Group C Clay – 32S/16D	(Czechoslovakia) Jan Kodeš (Czechoslovakia) Vladimír Zedník; 7–6, 7–6	(Hungary) Róbert Machán (Hungary) Balázs Taróczy	(Czechoslovakia) Jan Písecký (Sweden) Ove Bengtson	(Czechoslovakia) Vladimír Zedník (Czechoslovakia) František Pála (Australia) Barry Phillips-Moore (Sweden) Kjell Johansson
29 Oct	Jean Becker Open; Paris, France; Group B Hard (i) – $50,000 – 48S/23D; Singles – Doubles	(Romania) Ilie Năstase; 4–6, 6–1, 3–6, 6–0, 6–2	(United States) Stan Smith	(Netherlands) Tom Okker (West Germany) Karl Meiler	(France) Jean-Baptiste Chanfreau (United States) Arthur Ashe (United States) Roscoe Tanner (Sweden) Leif Johansson
29 Oct	Jean Becker Open; Paris, France; Group B Hard (i) – $50,000 – 48S/23D; Singles – Doubles	(Spain) Juan Gisbert Sr. (Romania) Ilie Năstase; 6–4, 6–4	(United States) Arthur Ashe (United States) Roscoe Tanner	(Netherlands) Tom Okker (West Germany) Karl Meiler	(France) Jean-Baptiste Chanfreau (United States) Arthur Ashe (United States) Roscoe Tanner (Sweden) Leif Johansson
29 Oct	Indonesia Open; Jakarta, Indonesia; Group C 32S/16D	(Australia) John Newcombe; 7–6, 7–6, 6–3	(Australia) Ross Case	(Australia) Ian Fletcher (West Germany) Jürgen Fassbender	(Mexico) Marcelo Lara (Australia) Ray Keldie (Indonesia) Gondo Widjojo (Australia) Allan Stone
29 Oct	Indonesia Open; Jakarta, Indonesia; Group C 32S/16D	(United States) Mike Estep (Australia) Ian Fletcher; 7–5, 6–4	(Australia) John Newcombe (Australia) Allan Stone	(Australia) Ian Fletcher (West Germany) Jürgen Fassbender	(Mexico) Marcelo Lara (Australia) Ray Keldie (Indonesia) Gondo Widjojo (Australia) Allan Stone
29 Oct	Viceroy Classic; Hong Kong; Group C Hard – 32S/16D; Singles – Doubles	(Australia) Rod Laver; 6–3, 3–6, 6–2, 6–2	(United States) Charlie Pasarell	(India) Anand Amritraj (Australia) Fred Stolle	(United States) Paul Gerken (Australia) Mal Anderson (United States) Brian Gottfried (Mexico) Raúl Ramírez
29 Oct	Viceroy Classic; Hong Kong; Group C Hard – 32S/16D; Singles – Doubles	(Australia) Colin Dibley (Australia) Rod Laver; 6–3, 5–7, 17–15	(United States) Paul Gerken (United States) Brian Gottfried	(India) Anand Amritraj (Australia) Fred Stolle	(United States) Paul Gerken (Australia) Mal Anderson (United States) Brian Gottfried (Mexico) Raúl Ramírez

=== November ===
Week	Tournament	Champions	Runners-up	Semifinalists	Quarterfinalists
5 Nov	Stockholm Open; Stockholm, Sweden; Group A Hard (i) – 48S/24D; Singles – Doubles	(United States) Tom Gorman; 6–3, 4–6, 7–6^{(7–5)}	(Sweden) Björn Borg	(Netherlands) Tom Okker (United States) Jimmy Connors	(United States) Stan Smith (United States) Arthur Ashe (Spain) Manuel Orantes (Socialist Federal Republic of Yugoslavia) Nikola Pilić
5 Nov	Stockholm Open; Stockholm, Sweden; Group A Hard (i) – 48S/24D; Singles – Doubles	(United States) Jimmy Connors (Romania) Ilie Năstase; 6–3, 6–7, 6–2	(Australia) Bob Carmichael (South Africa) Frew McMillan	(Netherlands) Tom Okker (United States) Jimmy Connors	(United States) Stan Smith (United States) Arthur Ashe (Spain) Manuel Orantes (Socialist Federal Republic of Yugoslavia) Nikola Pilić
5 Nov	Australian Indoor Championships; Sydney, Australia; Group B Hard (i) – 32S/16D; Singles – Doubles	(Australia) Rod Laver; 3–6, 7–5, 6–3, 3–6, 6–4	(Australia) John Newcombe	(Australia) Phil Dent (Australia) Ken Rosewall	(Australia) Geoff Masters (Australia) Ross Case (United States) Sherwood Stewart (Mexico) Raúl Ramírez
5 Nov	Australian Indoor Championships; Sydney, Australia; Group B Hard (i) – 32S/16D; Singles – Doubles	(Australia) Rod Laver (Australia) John Newcombe; 7–6, 6–2	(Australia) Mal Anderson (Australia) Ken Rosewall	(Australia) Phil Dent (Australia) Ken Rosewall	(Australia) Geoff Masters (Australia) Ross Case (United States) Sherwood Stewart (Mexico) Raúl Ramírez
12 Nov	Dewar Cup; London, Great Britain; Group B Carpet (i) – 32S/16D	(Netherlands) Tom Okker; 6–3, 6–4	(Romania) Ilie Năstase	(United States) Jimmy Connors (United Kingdom) Mark Cox	(South Africa) Raymond Moore (France) Patrick Proisy (United States) Tom Gorman (Romania) Ion Țiriac
12 Nov	Dewar Cup; London, Great Britain; Group B Carpet (i) – 32S/16D	(United Kingdom) Mark Cox (Australia) Owen Davidson; 6–4, 8–6	(United Kingdom) Gerald Battrick (United Kingdom) Graham Stilwell	(United States) Jimmy Connors (United Kingdom) Mark Cox	(South Africa) Raymond Moore (France) Patrick Proisy (United States) Tom Gorman (Romania) Ion Țiriac
12 Nov	Benson & Hedges Classic; Christchurch, New Zealand; Group C 29S/12D	(Australia) Fred Stolle; 7–6, 6–4, 6–1	(United States) Brian Gottfried	(United States) Sherwood Stewart (United States) Fred McNair	(Australia) Allan Stone (United States) Dick Dell (United States) Mike Estep (United States) Jim McManus
12 Nov	Benson & Hedges Classic; Christchurch, New Zealand; Group C 29S/12D	(India) Anand Amritraj (United States) Fred McNair; Walkover	(West Germany) Jürgen Fassbender (New Zealand) Jeff Simpson	(United States) Sherwood Stewart (United States) Fred McNair	(Australia) Allan Stone (United States) Dick Dell (United States) Mike Estep (United States) Jim McManus
19 Nov	South African Championships (Note: The tournament started on 14 November.); Johannesburg, South Africa; Group A Hard – 32S/16D/16XD	(United States) Jimmy Connors; 6–4, 7–6, 6–3	(United States) Arthur Ashe	(South Africa) Cliff Drysdale (Netherlands) Tom Okker	(South Africa) Byron Bertram (South Africa) Bob Hewitt (Chile) Jaime Fillol (United Kingdom) Mark Cox
19 Nov	South African Championships; Johannesburg, South Africa; Group A Hard – 32S/16D/16XD	(United States) Arthur Ashe (Netherlands) Tom Okker; 6–2, 4–6, 6–2, 6–4	(Australia) Lew Hoad (South Africa) Bob Maud	(South Africa) Cliff Drysdale (Netherlands) Tom Okker	(South Africa) Byron Bertram (South Africa) Bob Hewitt (Chile) Jaime Fillol (United Kingdom) Mark Cox
19 Nov	South African Championships; Johannesburg, South Africa; Group A Hard – 32S/16D/16XD	(Australia) Evonne Goolagong (West Germany) Jürgen Fassbender; 6–3, 6–2	(South Africa) Ilana Kloss (South Africa) Bernard Mitton	(South Africa) Cliff Drysdale (Netherlands) Tom Okker	(South Africa) Byron Bertram (South Africa) Bob Hewitt (Chile) Jaime Fillol (United Kingdom) Mark Cox
19 Nov	South American Championships; Buenos Aires, Argentina; Group B Clay – 32S/4D; Singles	(Argentina) Guillermo Vilas; 3–6, 6–7, 6–4, 6–6^{(5–5)} ret.	(Sweden) Björn Borg	(Colombia) Iván Molina (United States) Eddie Dibbs	(Romania) Ion Țiriac (Socialist Federal Republic of Yugoslavia) Željko Franulović (Romania) Toma Ovici (Chile) Jaime Pinto Bravo
19 Nov	South American Championships; Buenos Aires, Argentina; Group B Clay – 32S/4D; Singles	(Argentina) Ricardo Cano (Argentina) Guillermo Vilas; 7–6, 6–2	(Chile) Patricio Cornejo (Colombia) Iván Molina	(Colombia) Iván Molina (United States) Eddie Dibbs	(Romania) Ion Țiriac (Socialist Federal Republic of Yugoslavia) Željko Franulović (Romania) Toma Ovici (Chile) Jaime Pinto Bravo
26 Nov	Davis Cup Final; Cleveland, United States – carpet	Australia; 5–0	United States	Romania; Czechoslovakia	

=== December ===
Week	Tournament	Champions	Runners-up	Semifinalists	Quarterfinalists
3 Dec	Commercial Union Assurance Masters; Boston, United States; Hard (i) – $50,000 – 8S; Singles	(Romania) Ilie Năstase; 6–3, 7–5, 4–6, 6–3	(Netherlands) Tom Okker	(United States) Jimmy Connors (Australia) John Newcombe	Round robin (Czechoslovakia) Jan Kodeš (United States) Tom Gorman (United States) Stan Smith (Spain) Manuel Orantes

== Grand Prix points system ==
The tournaments listed above were divided into four groups. Group AA consisted of the Triple Crown – the French Open, the Wimbledon Championships and the US Open – while the other tournaments were divided into Groups A, B and C by prize money and draw size. Points were allocated based on these groups and the finishing position of a player in a tournament. No points were awarded to first round losers and ties were settled by the number of tournaments played. The points allocation is listed below:

Group AA
- Champion: 100
- Runner-up: 75
- Semifinalist: 50
- Quarterfinalist: 25
- Fourth Round: 12
- Third Round: 6
- Second Round: 3

Group A
- Champion: 60
- Runner-up: 40
- Semifinalist: 30
- Quarterfinalist: 15
- 9th – 16th: 7
- 17th – 32nd: 3
- 33rd – 64th: 1

Group B
- Champion: 40
- Runner-up: 30
- Semifinalist: 20
- 5th – 8th: 10
- 9th – 16th: 5
- 17th – 32nd: 2

Group C
- Champion: 20
- Runner-up: 15
- Semifinalist: 10
- 5th – 8th: 5
- 9th – 16th: 3
- 17th – 32nd: 1

== Grand Prix rankings ==
1) Ilie Năstase 610 points, 2) John Newcombe 512.5 points, 3) Tom Okker 498 points, 4) Jimmy Connors 383 points, 5) Manuel Orantes 358.5 points, 6) Jan Kodeš 315 points, 7) Stan Smith 274 points, 8) Tom Gorman 270 points, 9) Björn Borg 240 points, 10) Arthur Ashe 236 points, 11) Rod Laver 230 points, 12) Nikki Pilic 210 points, 13) Jaime Fillol 203 points, 14) Raúl Ramírez 186.5 points, 15) Onny Parun 177 points, 16) Vijay Amritraj 169.5 points, 17) Ken Rosewall 169 points, 18) Eddie Dibbs 155 points, 19) Karl Meiler 155 points, 20) Marty Riessen 141 points, 21) Alex Metreveli 141 points, 22) Jiří Hřebec 131 points, 23) Ross Case 126 points, 24) Roger Taylor 126 points, 25) Guillermo Vilas 121 points, 26) Adriano Panatta 119 points, 27) Brian Gottfried 118 points, 28) Mark Cox 118 points, 29) Jürgen Fassbender 115 points, 30) Charles Pasarell 112 points, 31) Cliff Drysdale 112 points, 32) Paolo Bertolucci 104 points, 33) Geoff Masters 100 points, 34) Ray Moore 98 points, 35) John Alexander 98 points

== ATP rankings ==
On 23 August 1973 the Association of Tennis Professionals published its first list of computer rankings, using points averages rather than points totals in their calculations. These are the ATP rankings of the top twenty singles players in the first list and at the end of the 1973 season, with numbers of ranking points, points averages, numbers of tournaments played, year-end rankings in 1973, highest and lowest positions during the season and number of spots gained or lost from the first rankings to the year-end rankings.

As of 23 August 1973
Rk	Name
1	Ilie Năstase (ROM)
2	Manuel Orantes (ESP)
3	Stan Smith (USA)
4	Arthur Ashe (USA)
5	Rod Laver (AUS)
6	Ken Rosewall (AUS)
7	John Newcombe (AUS)
8	Adriano Panatta (ITA)
9	Tom Okker (NED)
10	Jimmy Connors (USA)
11	Jan Kodeš (TCH)
12	Paolo Bertolucci (ITA)
13	Roger Taylor (GBR)
14	Marty Riessen (USA)
15	Tom Gorman (USA)
16	Nikola Pilić (YUG)
17	Cliff Richey (USA)
18	Mark Cox (GBR)
19	Roy Emerson (AUS)
20	Karl Meiler (FRG)

Year-end rankings 1973 (14 December 1973)
Rk	Name	Points	Average	High	Low	Change
1	Ilie Năstase (ROM)			1		=
2	John Newcombe (AUS)			2	7	▲5
3	Jimmy Connors (USA)			3	10	▲7
4	Tom Okker (NED)			4	9	▲5
5	Stan Smith (USA)			3	5	▼2
6	Ken Rosewall (AUS)			6	7	=
7	Manuel Orantes (ESP)			2	7	▼5
8	Rod Laver (AUS)			5	10	▼3
9	Jan Kodeš (TCH)			5	11	▲2
10	Arthur Ashe (USA)			4	10	▼6
11	Tom Gorman (USA)					
12	Roy Emerson (AUS)					
13	Marty Riessen (USA)					
14	Adriano Panatta (ITA)					
15	Nikola Pilić (YUG)					
16	Roger Taylor (GBR)					
17	Jaime Fillol (CHI)					
18	Björn Borg (SWE)					
19	Cliff Richey (USA)					
20	Paolo Bertolucci (ITA)					

== See also ==
- 1973 World Championship Tennis circuit
- 1973 WTA Tour
- 1973 USLTA Indoor Circuit
