= 1973 Volvo International – Doubles =

Doubles
- 1973 Volvo International

Final
- Champion: (Australia) Rod Laver (Australia) Fred Stolle
- Runner-up: (Australia) Bob Carmichael (South Africa) Frew McMillan
- Score: 7–6, 4–6, 7–5

Details
- Draw: 14

Events
Singles	Doubles
- Volvo International

The 1973 Volvo International – Doubles was one of the competitions of the 1973 Volvo International tennis tournament held on outdoor clay courts at the Mount Washington Hotel in Bretton Woods, New Hampshire, United States, between July 23 and July 29, 1973. The draw comprised 14 teams. Rod Laver and Fred Stolle won the doubles title after a three-sets victory in the final against Bob Carmichael and Frew McMillan, 7–6, 4–6, 7–5.

== Draw ==
Key

- Q = Qualifier
- WC = Wild card
- LL = Lucky loser
- Alt = Alternate
- ITF = ITF entry
- PR = Protected ranking
- SR = Special ranking
- SE = Special exempt
- JE = Junior exempt
- JR = Junior Accelerator Programme entrant
- CO = College Accelerator Programme entrant
- NG = Next Gen Accelerator Program entrant
- w/o = Walkover
- r = Retired
- d = Defaulted

First Round
(United States) Jeff Austin (United States) Steve Faulk	4	3
(Australia) John Bartlett (Australia) Kim Warwick	6	6
(Venezuela) Humphrey Hose (United States) Rudy Hernando	4	6	6
(United States) William Higgins (United States) Franklin Robbins	6	3	3
(Australia) Ian Fletcher (South Africa) Terry Ryan	6	6	3
(Australia) John Alexander (United States) Chuck McKinley	7	4	6
(India) Anand Amritraj (India) Vijay Amritraj	w/o
(United States) Terry Moor (United States) Unknown
(Japan) Jun Kamiwazumi (Japan) Toshiro Sakai	3	4
(United States) Tom Edlefsen (United States) Tom Leonard	6	6
(South Africa) Pat Cramer (United States) Butch Seewagen	w/o
(Australia) Ken Fletcher (Colombia) Iván Molina

Quarterfinals
(Australia) Rod Laver (Australia) Fred Stolle	w/o
(Australia) John Bartlett (Australia) Kim Warwick
(Venezuela) Humphrey Hose (United States) Rudy Hernando	3	1
(Australia) John Alexander (United States) Chuck McKinley	6	6
(India) Anand Amritraj (India) Vijay Amritraj	6	2	6
(United States) Tom Edlefsen (United States) Tom Leonard	4	6	3
(South Africa) Pat Cramer (United States) Butch Seewagen	6	3	2
(Australia) Bob Carmichael (South Africa) Frew McMillan	3	6	6

Semifinals
(Australia) Rod Laver (Australia) Fred Stolle	2	6	6
(Australia) John Alexander (United States) Chuck McKinley	6	3	4
(India) Anand Amritraj (India) Vijay Amritraj	6	5
(Australia) Bob Carmichael (South Africa) Frew McMillan	7	7

Final
(Australia) Rod Laver (Australia) Fred Stolle	7	4	7
(Australia) Bob Carmichael (South Africa) Frew McMillan	6	6	5
