= 1973 Volvo International =

- Date: July 23–29
- Edition: 1st
- Category: Grand Prix (C)
- Draw: 28S / 14D
- Prize money: $25,000
- Surface: Clay / outdoor
- Location: Bretton Woods, New Hampshire, United States
- Venue: Mount Washington Hotel

Champions

Singles
- (India) Vijay Amritraj

Doubles
- (Australia) Rod Laver / (Australia) Fred Stolle
- Volvo International

The 1973 Volvo International was a men's tennis tournament played on outdoor clay courts at the Mount Washington Hotel in Bretton Woods, New Hampshire in the United States. The event was part of the 1973 Commercial Union Assurance Grand Prix circuit and classified as C category. The tournament was held from July 23 through July 29, 1973. Eighth-seeded Vijay Amritraj won the singles title.

== Finals ==
=== Singles ===
(India) Vijay Amritraj defeated (United States) Jimmy Connors 7–5, 2–6, 7–5

- It was Amritraj's 1st title of the year and the 1st of his career.

=== Doubles ===
(Australia) Rod Laver / (Australia) Fred Stolle defeated (Australia) Bob Carmichael / (South Africa) Frew McMillan 2–6, 6–3, 6–4

- It was Laver's 10th title of the year and the 47th of his professional career. It was Stolle's 3rd title of the year and the 12th of his professional career.
