= 1973 Dutch Open (tennis) =

- Date: 16–22 July
- Edition: 16th
- Category: Grand Prix (Group C)
- Draw: 32S / 16D
- Surface: Clay / outdoor
- Location: Hilversum, Netherlands
- Venue: 't Melkhuisje

Champions

Men's singles
- (Netherlands) Tom Okker

Women's singles
- (Netherlands) Betty Stöve

Men's doubles
- (Colombia) Iván Molina / (Australia) Allan Stone

Women's doubles
- (Netherlands) Betty Stöve / (West Germany) Helga Masthoff

Mixed doubles
- (Netherlands) Tine Zwaan / (Australia) Geoff Masters
- Dutch Open

The 1973 Dutch Open was a combined men's and women's tennis tournament staged at 't Melkhuisje in Hilversum, Netherlands. The men's event was part of the Grand Prix circuit and categorized in Group C. The tournament was played on outdoor clay courts and was held from 16 July to 23 July 1973. It was the 16th edition of the tournament. Tom Okker and Betty Stöve won the singles titles.

== Finals ==
=== Men's singles ===
(Netherlands) Tom Okker defeated (Spain) Andrés Gimeno 2–6, 6–4, 6–4, 6–7, 6–3

=== Women's singles ===
(Netherlands) Betty Stöve defeated (West Germany) Helga Masthoff 7–5, 6–2

=== Men's doubles ===
(Colombia) Iván Molina / (Australia) Allan Stone defeated (Spain) Andrés Gimeno / (Spain) Antonio Muñoz 4–6, 7–6, 6–4

=== Women's doubles ===
(Netherlands) Betty Stöve / (West Germany) Helga Masthoff defeated (Netherlands) Trudy Walhof / (South Africa) Brigitte Cuypers 6–2, 7–6

=== Mixed doubles ===
(Netherlands) Tine Zwaan / (Australia) Geoff Masters defeated (Netherlands) Betty Stöve / (South Africa) Robert Maud 6–1, 6–4
