= 1973 Viceroy Classic =

Tennis tournament

- Date: 29 October – 4 November
- Edition: 1st
- Category: Grand Prix (Grade C)
- Draw: 32S / 16D
- Prize money: $25,000
- Surface: Hard / outdoor
- Location: Hong Kong

Champions

Singles
- (Australia) Rod Laver

Doubles
- (Australia) Colin Dibley / (Australia) Rod Laver
- Hong Kong Open

The 1973 Viceroy Classic, also known as the Hong Kong Open, was a men's tennis tournament played on outdoor hard courts in Hong Kong. It was the inaugural edition of the event and was held from 29 October through 4 November 1973. The tournament was part of the Grade C tier of the 1973 Grand Prix tennis circuit. Rod Laver won the singles title.

== Finals ==
=== Singles ===
(Australia) Rod Laver defeated (United States) Charlie Pasarell 6–3, 3–6, 6–2, 6–2

- It was Laver's 6th singles title of the year and the 61st of his career in the Open Era.

=== Doubles ===
(Australia) Colin Dibley / (Australia) Rod Laver defeated (United States) Paul Gerken / (United States) Brian Gottfried 6–3, 5–7, 17–15
