= 1973 South African Open (tennis) =

- Date: 14–27 November
- Edition: 70th
- Category: Grand Prix A series
- Draw: 32S / 32D
- Surface: Hard / outdoor
- Location: Johannesburg, South Africa
- Venue: Ellis Park Tennis Stadium

Champions

Men's singles
- (United States) Jimmy Connors

Women's singles
- (United States) Chris Evert

Men's doubles
- (United States) Arthur Ashe / (Netherlands) Tom Okker

Women's doubles
- (South Africa) Linky Boshoff / (South Africa) Ilana Kloss
- South African Open

The 1973 South African Open was a combined men's and women's tennis tournament played on outdoor hard courts in Johannesburg, South Africa that was part of the 1973 Commercial Union Assurance Grand Prix. It was the 70th edition of the tournament and was held from 14 November through 27 November 1973. Jimmy Connors and Chris Evert won the singles titles.

== Finals ==
=== Men's singles ===
(United States) Jimmy Connors defeated (United States) Arthur Ashe 6–4, 7–6, 6–3

=== Women's singles ===
(United States) Chris Evert defeated (Australia) Evonne Goolagong 6–3, 6–3

=== Men's doubles ===
(United States) Arthur Ashe / (Netherlands) Tom Okker defeated (Australia) Lew Hoad / (South Africa) Robert Maud 6–2, 4–6, 6–2, 6–4

=== Women's doubles ===
(South Africa) Linky Boshoff / (South Africa) Ilana Kloss defeated (United States) Chris Evert / (United Kingdom) Virginia Wade 7–6, 2–6, 6–1
