= 1973 Viceroy Classic – Singles =

Tennis tournament event

Singles
- 1973 Viceroy Classic

Final
- Champion: (Australia) Rod Laver
- Runner-up: (United States) Charlie Pasarell
- Score: 6–3, 3–6, 6–2, 6–2

Details
- Draw: 32

Events
Singles	Doubles
Hong Kong Open	· 1974 →

The 1973 Viceroy Classic – Singles was an event of the 1973 Viceroy Classic men's tennis tournament that was played in Hong Kong from 29 October until 4 November 1973. The draw comprised 32 players. Rod Laver won the singles title, defeating Charlie Pasarell in the final, 6–3, 3–6, 6–2, 6–2.

== Draw ==
=== Key ===
- Q = Qualifier
- WC = Wild card
- LL = Lucky loser
- Alt = Alternate
- SE = Special exempt
- PR = Protected ranking
- ITF = ITF entry
- JE = Junior exempt
- w/o = Walkover
- r = Retired
- d = Defaulted
- SR = Special ranking

=== Finals ===
Semifinals
(Australia) Rod Laver	6	6
(India) Anand Amritraj	3	3
(Australia) Fred Stolle	0	7	4
(United States) Charlie Pasarell	6	6	6

Final
(Australia) Rod Laver	6	3	6
(United States) Charlie Pasarell	3	6	2

=== Top half ===
First Round
(Australia) Rod Laver	4	6	6
(United States) Dick Dell	6	3	3
(Australia) John Cooper	7	6	6
(Australia) Bob Giltinan	6	7	0
(United States) Paul Gerken	6	6
(Philippines) Alexander Marcial	0	4
(Australia) Syd Ball	7	7
(Philippines) Eddie Cruz	6	6
(United States) Sherwood Stewart	6	6
(Australia) Colin Dibley	4	1
(India) Anand Amritraj	6	6
(Hong Kong) Jeck Chu	3	2
(Australia) Mal Anderson	6	6
(Hong Kong) Alan Ho	1	0
(Czechoslovakia) Milan Holeček	6	6
(Philippines) Kenneth Tsui	1	0

Second Round
(Australia) Rod Laver	6	7
(Australia) John Cooper	3	5
(United States) Paul Gerken	3	7	11
(Australia) Syd Ball	6	6	9
(United States) Sherwood Stewart	6	5	6
(India) Anand Amritraj	4	7	8
(Australia) Mal Anderson	6	7
(Czechoslovakia) Milan Holeček	3	6

Quarterfinals
(Australia) Rod Laver	7	6
(United States) Paul Gerken	6	2
(India) Anand Amritraj	6	6
(Australia) Mal Anderson	3	4

Semifinals
(Australia) Rod Laver	6	6
(India) Anand Amritraj	3	3

=== Bottom half ===
First Round
(United States) Jim McManus	6	6
(Japan) Osamu Ishiguro	1	2
(Australia) Fred Stolle	6	6
(Hong Kong) K. S. Leung	1	3
(New Zealand) Jeff Simpson	6	6
(Hong Kong) Po Tau	4	0
(United States) Brian Gottfried	6	6
(Hong Kong) William Koo	1	0
(Australia) John Bartlett	6	7
(Socialist Federal Republic of Yugoslavia) Željko Franulović	1	6
(Mexico) Raúl Ramírez	6	4	6
(Australia) Ashley Cooper	4	6	1
(United States) Charlie Pasarell	6	6
(Hong Kong) Charles Chang	4	2
(India) Vijay Amritraj	6	6
(Hong Kong) Tau Luu	2	2

Second Round
(United States) Jim McManus	2	3
(Australia) Fred Stolle	6	6
(New Zealand) Jeff Simpson	4	1
(United States) Brian Gottfried	6	6
(Australia) John Bartlett	3	2
(Mexico) Raúl Ramírez	6	6
(United States) Charlie Pasarell	6	6
(India) Vijay Amritraj	3	4

Quarterfinals
(Australia) Fred Stolle	6	6
(United States) Brian Gottfried	3	4
(Mexico) Raúl Ramírez	2	6
(United States) Charlie Pasarell	6	7

Semifinals
(Australia) Fred Stolle	0	7	4
(United States) Charlie Pasarell	6	6	6
