= 1973 Berlin Open =

- Date: 4–11 June
- Edition: 1st
- Category: Grand Prix (Group C)
- Draw: 32S / 16D
- Prize money: $25,000
- Surface: Clay / outdoor
- Location: Berlin, West Germany

Champions

Singles
- (West Germany) Hans-Jürgen Pohmann

Doubles
- (West Germany) Jürgen Fassbender / (Australia) Allan Stone
- Berlin Open

The 1973 Berlin Open was a men's tennis tournament staged in Berlin, West Germany. The men's event was part of the Grand Prix circuit and categorized in Group C. The tournament was played on outdoor clay courts and was held from 4 June until 11 June 1973. It was the inaugural edition of the tournament and Hans-Jürgen Pohmann won the singles title.

== Finals ==
=== Singles ===
(West Germany) Hans-Jürgen Pohmann defeated (West Germany) Karl Meiler 6–3, 3–6, 6–3, 6–3

- It was Pohmann's first singles title of his career.

=== Doubles ===
(West Germany) Jürgen Fassbender / (West Germany) Hans-Jürgen Pohmann defeated (Mexico) Raúl Ramírez / (Mexico) Joaquín Loyo-Mayo 4–6, 6–4, 6–4
