= 1973 Australian Indoor Championships – Singles =

Singles
- 1973 Australian Indoor Championships

Final
- Champion: (Australia) Rod Laver
- Runner-up: (Australia) John Newcombe
- Score: 3–6, 7–5, 6–3, 3–6, 6–4

Details
- Draw: 32

Events
Singles	Doubles
- Australian Indoor Tennis Championships

Rod Laver won in the final of the Australian Indoor Tennis Championships singles event 3–6, 7–5, 6–3, 3–6, 6–4 against John Newcombe. Ken Rosewall won the play-off match for third place against Phil Dent in three sets, 4–6, 6–3, 6–0.

== Draw ==
Key

- Q = Qualifier
- WC = Wild card
- LL = Lucky loser
- Alt = Alternate
- ITF = ITF entry
- PR = Protected ranking
- SR = Special ranking
- SE = Special exempt
- JE = Junior exempt
- JR = Junior Accelerator Programme entrant
- CO = College Accelerator Programme entrant
- NG = Next Gen Accelerator Program entrant
- w/o = Walkover
- r = Retired
- d = Defaulted

Semifinals
(Australia) John Newcombe	6	6
(Australia) Phil Dent	3	4
(Australia) Ken Rosewall	4	6	6
(Australia) Rod Laver	6	3	8

Final
(Australia) John Newcombe	6	5	6	3	6
(Australia) Rod Laver	3	7	3	6	4

=== Section 1 ===
First round
(Australia) J Newcombe	6	4	6
(Australia) J Alexander	3	6	4
(United States) C Pasarell	6	6
(Australia) P Kronk	3	3
(Australia) G Masters	7	6
(United States) B Gottfried	6	3
(India) J Singh	7	6
(India) A Amritraj	6	1
(West Germany) J Fassbender	6	6
(India) V Amritraj	1	4
(Australia) P Dent	4	6	6
(Socialist Federal Republic of Yugoslavia) Ž Franulović	6	4	1
(United States) M Estep	6	6
(Australia) M Anderson	3	1
(Australia) R Case	6	6	6
(Australia) F Stolle	7	1	4

Second round
(Australia) J Newcombe	6	3	6
(United States) C Pasarell	4	6	3
(Australia) G Masters	7	6
(India) J Singh	5	4
(West Germany) J Fassbender	3	3
(Australia) P Dent	6	6
(United States) M Estep	7	3	5
(Australia) R Case	5	6	7

Quarterfinals
(Australia) J Newcombe	6	6
(Australia) G Masters	3	4
(Australia) P Dent	7	6
(Australia) R Case	6	2

Semifinals
(Australia) J Newcombe	6	6
(Australia) P Dent	3	4

=== Section 2 ===
First round
(Australia) K Rosewall	6	7
(Australia) B Giltinan	1	5
(Australia) I Fletcher	6	4	7
(Australia) A Stone	4	6	5
(United States) J McManus	6	7
(Australia) C Dibley	4	6
(United States) S Stewart	6	2
(Mexico) M Lara	2	0	r
(Australia) R Laver	6	6
(United States) K McMillan	2	2
(United States) P Gerken	6	6
(Australia) M Mulligan	4	1
(Mexico) R Ramírez	6	6
(Czechoslovakia) M Holeček	3	3
(New Zealand) R Simpson	7	7
(Australia) D Crealy	6	5

Second round
(Australia) K Rosewall	6	6
(Australia) I Fletcher	3	0
(United States) J McManus	4	6	5
(United States) S Stewart	6	2	7
(Australia) R Laver	6	7
(United States) P Gerken	2	5
(Mexico) R Ramírez	6	6
(New Zealand) R Simpson	3	4

Quarterfinals
(Australia) K Rosewall	7	6
(United States) S Stewart	5	2
(Australia) R Laver	6	7
(Mexico) R Ramírez	0	5

Semifinals
(Australia) K Rosewall	4	6	6
(Australia) R Laver	6	3	8
