= 1973 U.S. Pro Tennis Championships =

- Date: July 16–23
- Edition: 46th
- Category: Grand Prix (Group B)
- Draw: 32S / 16D
- Prize money: $60,000
- Surface: Hard / outdoor
- Location: Chestnut Hill, Massachusetts
- Venue: Longwood Cricket Club

Champions

Singles
- (United States) Jimmy Connors

Doubles
- (United States) Stan Smith / (United States) Erik van Dillen
← 1972 ·	U.S. Pro Tennis Championships	· 1974 →

The 1973 U.S. Pro Tennis Championships was a men's tennis tournament played on outdoor hard court at the Longwood Cricket Club in Chestnut Hill, Massachusetts in the United States. The event was classified as a Group B category tournament and was part of the 1973 Grand Prix circuit. It was the 46th edition of the tournament and was held from July 16 through July 23, 1973. Unseeded Jimmy Connors won the singles title and the accompanying $12,000 first prize money. Due to a rain-delay the final was played on Monday, July 24.

== Finals ==
=== Singles ===
(United States) Jimmy Connors defeated (United States) Arthur Ashe 6–3, 4–6, 6–4, 3–6, 6–2

- It was Connors' 7th singles title of the year and the 13th of his career.

=== Doubles ===
(United States) Stan Smith / (United States) Erik van Dillen defeated (Egypt) Ismail El Shafei / (United States) Marty Riessen 4–6, 6–4, 7–5
