= 1973 Volvo International – Singles =

Singles
- 1973 Volvo International

Final
- Champion: (India) Vijay Amritraj
- Runner-up: (United States) Jimmy Connors
- Score: 7–5, 2–6, 7–5

Details
- Draw: 28
- Seeds: 8

Events
| Singles | Doubles |
- Volvo International

The 1973 Volvo International – Singles was one of the competitions of the 1973 Volvo International tennis tournament held in Bretton Woods, New Hampshire, United States, between July 23 and July 29, 1973. The draw comprised 28 players of which eight were seeded. Eighth-seeded Vijay Amritraj won the singles title after a 7–5, 2–6, 7–5 win in the final against first-seeded Jimmy Connors.

== Seeds ==
A champion seed is indicated in bold text while text in italics indicates the round in which that seed was eliminated. The top four seeds received a bye to the second round.

1. (United States) Jimmy Connors (final)
2. (Australia) Rod Laver (quarterfinals)
3. (Australia) Ian Fletcher (semifinals)
4. (Australia) John Alexander (semifinals)
5. (United Kingdom) Gerald Battrick (quarterfinals)
6. (United States) Tom Edlefsen (quarterfinals)
7. (Australia) Bob Carmichael (quarterfinals)
8. (India) **Vijay Amritraj (champion)**

== Draw ==
Key

- Q = Qualifier
- WC = Wild card
- LL = Lucky loser
- Alt = Alternate
- ITF = ITF entry
- PR = Protected ranking
- SR = Special ranking
- SE = Special exempt
- JE = Junior exempt
- JR = Junior Accelerator Programme entrant
- CO = College Accelerator Programme entrant
- NG = Next Gen Accelerator Program entrant
- w/o = Walkover
- r = Retired
- d = Defaulted

=== Final ===
| Final |
| 1 | (United States) Jimmy Connors | 5 | **6** | 5 |
| | (India) **Vijay Amritraj** | **7** | 2 | **7** |

=== Section 1 ===
First round
(United States) S Faulk | 1 | 2
(Australia) **K Warwick** | **6** | **6**
(United States) B McKinley | **6** | 4 | 0
(United States) **F Robbins** | 1 | **6** | **6**
(South Africa) P Cramer | 0 | 1
7 | (Australia) **B Carmichael** | **6** | **6**
(United States) **B Seewagen** | 6 | **6** | **7**
(South Africa) T Ryan | **7** | 4 | 6
(Australia) J Bartlett | 3 | 2
(Japan) **T Sakai** | **6** | **6**
(Japan) J Kamiwazumi | 5 | **6** | 3
5 | (United Kingdom) **G Battrick** | **7** | 4 | **6**

Second round
1 | (United States) **J Connors** | 4
(Australia) K Warwick | 1^{r}
(United States) F Robbins | **6** | 6 | 3
7 | (Australia) **B Carmichael** | 4 | **7** | **6**
3 | (Australia) **I Fletcher** | **6** | **6**
(United States) B Seewagen | 1 | 1
(Japan) T Sakai | 6 | 3
5 | (United Kingdom) **G Battrick** | **7** | **6**

Quarterfinals
1 | (United States) **J Connors** | **6** | 4 | **6**
7 | (Australia) B Carmichael | 2 | **6** | 0
3 | (Australia) **I Fletcher** | 3 | **7** | **6**
5 | (United Kingdom) G Battrick | **6** | 5 | 3

Semifinals
1 | (United States) **J Connors** | **6** | **6**
3 | (Australia) I Fletcher | 4 | 4

=== Section 2 ===
First round
6 | (United States) **T Edlefsen** | **6** | 5 | **6**
O R Cruz | 4 | **7** | 3
(India) A Amritraj | 3 | 4
(United States) **T Moor** | **6** | **6**
(South Africa) **F McMillan** | **6** | 3 | **6**
(United States) W Higgins | 3 | **6** | 3
8 | (India) **V Amritraj** | 4 | **6** | **7**
(Venezuela) H Hose | **6** | 4 | 5
(United States) **J Austin** | **6** | **6**
(United States) T Leonard | 3 | 0
(United States) I Harris | 1 | 0
(United States) **R Fernando** | **6** | **6**

Second round
6 | (United States) **T Edlefsen** | **6** | **6**
(United States) T Moor | 3 | 1
(South Africa) F McMillan | 6 | 2
4 | (Australia) **J Alexander** | **7** | **6**
8 | (India) **V Amritraj** | **7** | 5 | **6**
(United States) J Austin | 6 | **7** | 2
(United States) R Fernando | d
2 | (Australia) **R Laver**

Quarterfinals
6 | (United States) T Edlefsen | 2 | 0
4 | (Australia) **J Alexander** | **6** | **6**
8 | (India) **V Amritraj** | 6 | **7** | **6**
2 | (Australia) R Laver | **7** | 6 | 3

Semifinals
4 | (Australia) J Alexander | 4 | 3
8 | (India) **V Amritraj** | **6** | **6**
