= 1973 Dutch Open – Men's singles =

Men's singles
- 1973 Dutch Open

Final
- Champion: (Netherlands) Tom Okker
- Runner-up: (Spain) Andrés Gimeno
- Score: 2–6, 6–4, 6–4, 6–7, 6–3

Details
- Draw: 32

Events
Singles	men	women
Doubles	men	women
- Dutch Open

The 1973 Dutch Open – Men's singles was an event of the 1973 Dutch Open tennis tournament played on outdoor clay courts in Hilversum, Netherlands between 16 July and 22 July 1973. John Cooper was the defending champion, but did not compete in this edition. Tom Okker won the singles title, defeating Andrés Gimeno in the final 2–6, 6–4, 6–4, 6–7, 6–3.

== Draw ==
Key

- Q = Qualifier
- WC = Wild card
- LL = Lucky loser
- Alt = Alternate
- ITF = ITF entry
- PR = Protected ranking
- SR = Special ranking
- SE = Special exempt
- JE = Junior exempt
- JR = Junior Accelerator Programme entrant
- CO = College Accelerator Programme entrant
- NG = Next Gen Accelerator Program entrant
- w/o = Walkover
- r = Retired
- d = Defaulted

=== Finals ===
Semifinals
(Netherlands) Tom Okker	6	7	7
(Australia) Allan Stone	2	6	6
(Spain) Andrés Gimeno	6	4	6	6
(Australia) Geoff Masters	1	6	1	2

Final
(Netherlands) Tom Okker	2	6	6	6	6
(Spain) Andrés Gimeno	6	4	4	7	3

=== Top half ===
First Round
(Netherlands) Tom Okker	6	6
(Switzerland) Rolf Spitzer	3	3
(United Kingdom) John Lloyd	6	6
(Hungary) János Benyik	4	4
(Australia) Ross Case	3	6	8
(Netherlands) Louk Sanders	6	3	6
(France) Wanaro N'Godrella	6	6
(Netherlands) Marian Laudin	4	4
(Spain) Antonio Muñoz	1	7	3
(Hungary) Bertalan Csoknyai	6	5	6
(France) Georges Goven	3	6	5
(West Germany) Attila Korpás	6	3	7
(Australia) Allan Stone	6	0	6
(Japan) Jun Kuki	4	6	2
(Chile) Jaime Pinto Bravo	6	6
(Netherlands) Rolf Thung	4	3

Second Round
(Netherlands) Tom Okker	6	6
(United Kingdom) John Lloyd	1	2
(Australia) Ross Case	0	4
(France) Wanaro N'Godrella	6	6
(Hungary) Bertalan Csoknyai	3	3
(West Germany) Attila Korpás	6	6
(Australia) Allan Stone	2	6	6
(Chile) Jaime Pinto Bravo	6	4	4

Quarterfinals
(Netherlands) Tom Okker	7	6
(France) Wanaro N'Godrella	6	1
(West Germany) Attila Korpás	6	0
(Australia) Allan Stone	7	6

Semifinals
(Netherlands) Tom Okker	6	7	7
(Australia) Allan Stone	2	6	6

=== Bottom half ===
First Round
(Spain) Andrés Gimeno	6	6
(South Africa) Pat Cramer	3	3
(Japan) Jun Kamiwazumi	4	4
(France) Jean-Baptiste Chanfreau	6	6
(South Africa) Bob Maud	4	6	1
(Denmark) Tom Christensen	6	3	6
(Australia) Ian Fletcher	6	6
(Netherlands) Fred Hemmes Sr.	3	0
(Australia) Geoff Masters	3	6	6
(India) Anand Amritraj	6	0	2
(United Kingdom) Stephen Warboys	3	4
(Netherlands) Jan Hordijk	6	6
(India) Vijay Amritraj	6	6
(Netherlands) Nick Fleury	0	1
(Colombia) Iván Molina	6	6
(France) Jean-François Caujolle	3	1

Second Round
(Spain) Andrés Gimeno	6	6
(France) Jean-Baptiste Chanfreau	3	1
(Denmark) Tom Christensen	1	2
(Australia) Ian Fletcher	6	6
(Australia) Geoff Masters	6	6
(Netherlands) Jan Hordijk	1	2
(India) Vijay Amritraj	5	6	4
(Colombia) Iván Molina	7	3	6

Quarterfinals
(Spain) Andrés Gimeno	4	6	6
(Australia) Ian Fletcher	6	3	0
(Australia) Geoff Masters	6	6
(Colombia) Iván Molina	1	2

Semifinals
(Spain) Andrés Gimeno	6	4	6
(Australia) Geoff Masters	1	6	1
