= 1973 Japan Open Tennis Championships =

- Date: 8–14 October
- Edition: 1st
- Category: Grand Prix (B)
- Prize money: $60,000
- Surface: Hard / outdoor
- Location: Tokyo, Japan

Champions

Men's singles
- (Australia) Ken Rosewall

Women's singles
- (Australia) Evonne Goolagong

Men's doubles
- (Australia) Mal Anderson / (Australia) Ken Rosewall
- Japan Open

The 1973 Fred Perry Japan Open Tennis Championships was a combined men's and women's tennis tournament played on outdoor hard courts and took place in Tokyo, Japan. The tournament was held from 8 October through 14 October 1973. The men's events were part of the 1973 Commercial Union Assurance Grand Prix circuit and graded as B category whereas the women's competition was a non-tour event. Ken Rosewall won the men's singles title, earning him the $12,000 first prize, while Evonne Goolagong won the women's singles event and received $5,000.

== Finals ==
=== Men's singles ===
(Australia) Ken Rosewall defeated (Australia) John Newcombe, 6–1, 6–4

=== Men's doubles ===
(Australia) Mal Anderson / (Australia) Ken Rosewall defeated (Australia) Colin Dibley / (Australia) Allan Stone, 7–5, 7–5

=== Women's singles ===
(Australia) Evonne Goolagong defeated (West Germany) Helga Niessen Masthoff, 6–3, 6–4
