= 1973 Rothmans South of England Championships =

Tennis tournament

- Date: 18–23 June
- Edition: 79th
- Category: Grand Prix (C class)
- Draw: 32S / 16D
- Prize money: $25,000
- Surface: Grass / outdoor
- Location: Eastbourne, England
- Venue: Devonshire Park Lawn Tennis Club

Champions

Singles
- (United Kingdom) Mark Cox

Doubles
- (Sweden) Ove Bengtson / (United States) Jim McManus
← 1972 ·	South of England Championships

The 1973 Rothmans South of England Championships was men's tennis tournament played on outdoor grass courts at Devonshire Park Lawn Tennis Club in Eastbourne, England. The event was part of the Grand Prix circuit and was categorized as C class. It was the 79th and last edition of the tournament and was held from 18 June until 23 June 1973. Mark Cox won the singles title, his third at the event after 1963 and 1968.

== Finals ==
=== Singles ===
(United Kingdom) Mark Cox defeated (France) Patrice Dominguez 6–2, 2–6, 6–3

=== Doubles ===
(Sweden) Ove Bengtson / (United States) Jim McManus defeated (Spain) Manuel Orantes / (Romania) Ion Țiriac 6–4, 4–6, 7–5
