= 1973 Australian Indoor Championships =

- Date: 4–11 November
- Edition: 1st
- Category: Grand Prix (Group B)
- Draw: 32S / 16D
- Prize money: $50,000
- Location: Sydney, Australia
- Venue: Hordern Pavilion

Champions

Singles
- (Australia) Rod Laver

Doubles
- (Australia) Rod Laver / (Australia) John Newcombe
- Australian Indoor Championships

The 1973 Australian Indoor Championships was a men's tennis tournament played on indoor hard courts at the Hordern Pavilion in Sydney, Australia. It was part of the 1973 Commercial Union Assurance Grand Prix as a Group B category tournament. It was the inaugural edition of the tournament and was held from 4 November through 11 November 1973. Rod Laver won the singles title and the accompanying $10,000 first-prize money.

== Finals ==
=== Singles ===
(Australia) Rod Laver defeated (Australia) John Newcombe 3–6, 7–5, 6–3, 3–6, 6–4

- It was Laver's 7th and last singles title of the year and the 63rd of his career in the Open Era.

=== Doubles ===
(Australia) Rod Laver / (Australia) John Newcombe defeated (Australia) Mal Anderson / (Australia) Ken Rosewall 7–6, 6–2

- It was Laver's 13th title of the year and the 49th of his career. It was Newcombe's 10th title of the year and the 48th of his career.
