= 1973 Rothmans Canadian Open =

- Date: August 20–26
- Edition: 84th
- Surface: Clay / outdoor
- Location: Toronto, Ontario, Canada
- Venue: Toronto Lawn Tennis Club

Champions

Men's singles
- (Netherlands) Tom Okker

Women's singles
- (Australia) Evonne Goolagong

Men's doubles
- (Australia) Rod Laver / (Australia) Ken Rosewall

Women's doubles
- (Australia) Evonne Goolagong / (United States) Peggy Michel
- Canadian Open

The 1973 Rothmans Canadian Open was a tennis tournament played on outdoor clay courts at the Toronto Lawn Tennis Club in Toronto in Canada that was part of the 1973 Commercial Union Assurance Grand Prix and of the 1973 WTA Tour. It was the 84th edition of the tournament and was held from August 20 through August 26, 1973. Tom Okker and Evonne Goolagong won the singles titles.

== Finals ==
=== Men's singles ===
(Netherlands) Tom Okker defeated (Spain) Manuel Orantes 6–3, 6–2, 6–1

- It was Okker's 12th title of the year and the 45th of his career.

=== Women's singles ===
(Australia) Evonne Goolagong defeated (West Germany) Helga Niessen Masthoff 7–6, 6–4

- It was Goolagong's 6th title of the year and the 37th of her career.

=== Men's doubles ===
(Australia) Rod Laver / (Australia) Ken Rosewall defeated (Australia) Owen Davidson / (Australia) John Newcombe 7–5, 7–6

- It was Laver's 9th title of the year and the 45th of his career. It was Rosewall's 6th professional title of the year and the 28th of his career.

=== Women's doubles ===
(Australia) Evonne Goolagong / (United States) Peggy Michel defeated (Czechoslovakia) Martina Navrátilová / (West Germany) Helga Niessen Masthoff 6–3, 6–2

- It was Goolagong's 7th title of the year and the 38th of her career. It was Michel's 1st title of the year and the 1st of her career.
