= 1973 Australian Indoor Championships – Doubles =

Doubles
- 1973 Australian Indoor Championships

Final
- Champions: (Australia) Rod Laver (Australia) John Newcombe
- Runners-up: (Australia) Malcolm Anderson (Australia) Ken Rosewall
- Score: 7–6, 6–2

Details
- Draw: 16

Events
Singles	Doubles
- Australian Indoor Championships

Rod Laver and John Newcombe won in the final 7–6, 6–2 against Malcolm Anderson and Ken Rosewall.

== Draw ==
Key

- Q = Qualifier
- WC = Wild card
- LL = Lucky loser
- Alt = Alternate
- ITF = ITF entry
- PR = Protected ranking
- SR = Special ranking
- SE = Special exempt
- JE = Junior exempt
- JR = Junior Accelerator Programme entrant
- CO = College Accelerator Programme entrant
- NG = Next Gen Accelerator Program entrant
- w/o = Walkover
- r = Retired
- d = Defaulted

=== Draw ===
First round
(Australia) R Laver (Australia) J Newcombe	6	6
(West Germany) J Fassbender (New Zealand) J Simpson	3	4
(Mexico) M Lara (India) J Singh	3	6	1
(Socialist Federal Republic of Yugoslavia) Ž Franulović (Czechoslovakia) M Holeček	6	4	6
(United States) P Gerken (United States) B Gottfried	1	6	8
(Australia) F Stolle (Australia) A Stone	6	3	10
(Australia) R Case (Australia) G Masters	4	2
(United States) M Estep (Australia) I Fletcher	6	6
(Australia) J Alexander (Australia) P Dent	7	3	5
(United States) F McNair (United States) C Pasarell	6	6	7
(Australia) S Ball (Australia) B Giltinan	6	6
(Australia) C Dibley (United States) J McManus	7	7
(Australia) M Anderson (Australia) K Rosewall	6	6
(Australia) D Crealy (Australia) P Kronk	2	4
(India) A Amritraj (United States) W Brown	4	4
(United States) D Dell (United States) S Stewart	6	6

Quarterfinals
(Australia) R Laver (Australia) J Newcombe
(Socialist Federal Republic of Yugoslavia) Ž Franulović (Czechoslovakia) M Holeček
(Australia) F Stolle (Australia) A Stone	6	4	8
(United States) M Estep (Australia) I Fletcher	4	6	10
(United States) F McNair (United States) C Pasarell	6	4
(Australia) C Dibley (United States) J McManus	7	6
(Australia) M Anderson (Australia) K Rosewall	6	6
(United States) D Dell (United States) S Stewart	1	4

Semifinals
(Australia) R Laver (Australia) J Newcombe	6	6
(United States) M Estep (Australia) I Fletcher	2	2
(Australia) C Dibley (United States) J McManus	6	4
(Australia) M Anderson (Australia) K Rosewall	7	6

Final
(Australia) R Laver (Australia) J Newcombe	7	6
(Australia) M Anderson (Australia) K Rosewall	6	2
