= 1973 Viceroy Classic – Doubles =

Tennis tournament event

Doubles
- 1973 Viceroy Classic

Final
- Champion: (Australia) Colin Dibley (Australia) Rod Laver
- Runner-up: (United States) Paul Gerken (United States) Brian Gottfried
- Score: 6–3, 5–7, 17–15

Details
- Draw: 12

Events
Singles	Doubles
- Hong Kong Open

The 1973 Viceroy Classic – Doubles was an event of the 1973 Viceroy Classic men's tennis tournament that was played in Hong Kong from 29 October until 4 November 1973. The draw consisted of 12 teams. Colin Dibley and Rod Laver won the doubles title, defeating Paul Gerken and Brian Gottfried in the final, 6–3, 5–7, 17–15.

== Draw ==
Key

- Q = Qualifier
- WC = Wild card
- LL = Lucky loser
- Alt = Alternate
- ITF = ITF entry
- PR = Protected ranking
- SR = Special ranking
- SE = Special exempt
- JE = Junior exempt
- JR = Junior Accelerator Programme entrant
- CO = College Accelerator Programme entrant
- NG = Next Gen Accelerator Program entrant
- w/o = Walkover
- r = Retired
- d = Defaulted

First Round
(Japan) Kenichi Hirai (Japan) Kiyoshi Tanabe	2	1
(Philippines) Federico Deyro (Philippines) Raymundo Deyro	6	6
(Mexico) Marcello Lara (United States) Sherwood Stewart	6	6
(Hong Kong) Wei Leung (Philippines) Kenneth Tsui	2	2
(Australia) Paul Kronk (Peru) Felix Ponte	1	4
(Australia) William Lloyd (Australia) Kim Warwick	6	6
(Philippines) Eddie Cruz (Czechoslovakia) Milan Holeček	7	4	2
(Philippines) Bien Dimalanta (Philippines) Alexander Marcial	6	6	6

Quarterfinals
(Australia) John Newcombe (United States) Charlie Pasarell	6	6
(Philippines) Federico Deyro (Philippines) Raymundo Deyro	4	4
(Mexico) Marcello Lara (United States) Sherwood Stewart	4	6	7
(Australia) Colin Dibley (Australia) Allan Stone	6	2	6
(West Germany) Jürgen Fassbender (West Germany) Hans-Jürgen Pohmann	6	6
(Australia) William Lloyd (Australia) Kim Warwick	2	0
(Philippines) Bien Dimalanta (Philippines) Alexander Marcial	3	4
(Australia) Ross Case (Australia) Geoff Masters	6	6

Semifinals
(Australia) John Newcombe (United States) Charlie Pasarell	6	5	2
(Mexico) Marcello Lara (United States) Sherwood Stewart	4	7	6
(West Germany) Jürgen Fassbender (West Germany) Hans-Jürgen Pohmann	6	6	7
(Australia) Ross Case (Australia) Geoff Masters	7	4	6

Final
(Mexico) Marcello Lara (United States) Sherwood Stewart	4	7	7
(West Germany) Jürgen Fassbender (West Germany) Hans-Jürgen Pohmann	6	5	6
