= 1973 Rothmans Canadian Open – Men's singles =

Men's singles
- 1973 Rothmans Canadian Open

Final
- Champion: (Netherlands) Tom Okker
- Runner-up: (Spain) Manuel Orantes
- Score: 6–3, 6–2, 6–1

Details
- Draw: 64
- Seeds: 16

Events
Singles	men	women
Doubles	men	women
← 1972 ·	Canadian Open	· 1974 →

The 1973 Rothmans Canadian Open – Men's singles was an event of the 1973 Rothmans Canadian Open tennis tournament that was played at the Toronto Lawn Tennis Club in Toronto in Canada rom August 20 through August 26, 1973. The draw comprised 64 players and 16 players were seeded. Ilie Năstase was the defending champion but did not participate in this edition. Third-seeded Tom Okker won the singles title, defeating fourth-seeded Manuel Orantes in the final, 6–3, 6–2, 6–1. He earned $15,000 first-prize money as well as 60 ranking points which moved him into third position on the Grand Prix ranking.

== Seeds ==
1. (United States) Stan Smith (first round)
2. (United States) Arthur Ashe (quarterfinals)
3. (Netherlands) Tom Okker (champion)
4. (Spain) Manuel Orantes (final)
5. (Socialist Federal Republic of Yugoslavia) Nikola Pilić (third round)
6. (Australia) Rod Laver (third round)
7. (Australia) Ken Rosewall (third round)
8. (United States) Marty Riessen (first round)
9. (Italy) Adriano Panatta (first round)
10. (Australia) John Newcombe (quarterfinals)
11. (United Kingdom) Mark Cox (third round)
12. (United States) Cliff Richey (first round)
13. (Chile) Jaime Fillol (third round)
14. (Australia) John Alexander (third round)
15. (Sweden) Björn Borg (quarterfinals)
16. (Italy) Paolo Bertolucci (quarterfinals)

Click on the seed number of a player to go to their draw section.

== Draw ==
=== Key ===
- Q = Qualifier
- WC = Wild card
- LL = Lucky loser
- Alt = Alternate
- SE = Special exempt
- PR = Protected ranking
- ITF = ITF entry
- JE = Junior exempt
- w/o = Walkover
- r = Retired
- d = Defaulted
- SR = Special ranking

=== Finals ===
Quarterfinals
(South Africa) Cliff Drysdale	6	6
16	(Italy) Paolo Bertolucci	2	4
4	(Spain) Manuel Orantes	7	7^{7}
15	(Sweden) Björn Borg	5	6^{4}
10	(Australia) John Newcombe	6^{3}	2
3	(Netherlands) Tom Okker	7^{7}	6
(Colombia) Iván Molina	6	6
2	(United States) Arthur Ashe	4	3

Semifinals
(South Africa) Cliff Drysdale	4	4
4	(Spain) Manuel Orantes	6	6
3	(Netherlands) Tom Okker	6	6^{3}	6
(Colombia) Iván Molina	3	7^{7}	1

Final
4	(Spain) Manuel Orantes	3	2	1
3	(Netherlands) Tom Okker	6	6	6

=== Top half ===
==== Section 1 ====
First Round
1	(United States) Stan Smith	6	5
(United States) Eddie Dibbs	7	7
(United States) Jeff Borowiak	6^{5}	5
(South Africa) Cliff Drysdale	7^{7}	7
13	(Chile) Jaime Fillol	6	6
(Canada) David Brown	4	2
(Australia) Ian Fletcher	6	6
(Italy) Corrado Barazzutti	1	0
8	(United States) Marty Riessen	3	2
(United States) Charlie Pasarell	6	6
(France) Patrick Proisy	6	6
(Venezuela) Humphrey Hose	1	3
16	(Italy) Paolo Bertolucci	6	7
(Sweden) Ove Bengtson	3	5
(Sweden) Rolf Norberg	2	7	6
(United States) Jim McManus	6	5	2

Second Round
(United States) Eddie Dibbs	6^{8}	6
(South Africa) Cliff Drysdale	7^{10}	7
13	(Chile) Jaime Fillol	6	6
(Australia) Ian Fletcher	4	3
(United States) Charlie Pasarell	6	6	6
(France) Patrick Proisy	7	3	2
16	(Italy) Paolo Bertolucci	6	6
(Sweden) Rolf Norberg	4	3

Third Round
(South Africa) Cliff Drysdale	6	5	7
13	(Chile) Jaime Fillol	3	7	6
(United States) Charlie Pasarell	6	4	2
16	(Italy) Paolo Bertolucci	1	6	6

Quarterfinals
(South Africa) Cliff Drysdale	6	6
16	(Italy) Paolo Bertolucci	2	4

==== Section 2 ====
First Round
4	(Spain) Manuel Orantes	3	6	6
(United States) Frank Froehling	6	2	3
(Canada) Don McCormick	2	1
(France) Wanaro N'Godrella	6	6
14	(Australia) John Alexander	6	7
(Canada) Tony Bardsley	4	6
(Czechoslovakia) Milan Holeček	6	5	6
(Australia) Bob Carmichael	1	7	2
7	(Australia) Ken Rosewall	6	6^{5}	6
(Italy) Tonino Zugarelli	3	7^{7}	4
(Argentina) Guillermo Vilas	6	6
(United States) Mike Estep	2	1
15	(Sweden) Björn Borg	6	6
(South Africa) Pat Cramer	4	2
(Australia) Phil Dent	2	6	2
(Australia) Dick Crealy	6	3	6

Second Round
4	(Spain) Manuel Orantes	6	6
(France) Wanaro N'Godrella	2	3
14	(Australia) John Alexander	6	7
(Czechoslovakia) Milan Holeček	0	5
7	(Australia) Ken Rosewall	7	6
(Argentina) Guillermo Vilas	6	0
15	(Sweden) Björn Borg	6	6
(Australia) Dick Crealy	2	3

Third Round
4	(Spain) Manuel Orantes	7	6
14	(Australia) John Alexander	5	3
7	(Australia) Ken Rosewall	6	1	5
15	(Sweden) Björn Borg	2	6	7

Quarterfinals
4	(Spain) Manuel Orantes	7	7^{7}
15	(Sweden) Björn Borg	5	6^{4}

=== Bottom half ===
==== Section 3 ====
First Round
(United Kingdom) Graham Stilwell	6	7
(Canada) Keith Carpenter	3	5
(South Africa) Ray Moore	2	1
10	(Australia) John Newcombe	6	6
(Canada) Chris Burr	2	2
(France) Jean-Baptiste Chanfreau	6	6
(Chile) Patricio Cornejo	4	1
5	(Socialist Federal Republic of Yugoslavia) Nikola Pilić	6	6
(South Africa) Frew McMillan	6	6
(Egypt) Ismail El Shafei	7	7
(Mexico) Raúl Ramírez	1	3
11	(United Kingdom) Mark Cox	6	6
(United Kingdom) Gerald Battrick	6	6
(Australia) Owen Davidson	2	2
(Australia) Ross Case	6	3	2
3	(Netherlands) Tom Okker	4	6	6

Second Round
(United Kingdom) Graham Stilwell	3	4
10	(Australia) John Newcombe	6	6
(France) Jean-Baptiste Chanfreau	6	6	0
5	(Socialist Federal Republic of Yugoslavia) Nikola Pilić	4	7	6
(Egypt) Ismail El Shafei	2	0
11	(United Kingdom) Mark Cox	6	6
(United Kingdom) Gerald Battrick	2	0
3	(Netherlands) Tom Okker	6	6

Third Round
10	(Australia) John Newcombe	6	6
5	(Socialist Federal Republic of Yugoslavia) Nikola Pilić	4	4
11	(United Kingdom) Mark Cox	6	4	4
3	(Netherlands) Tom Okker	4	6	6

Quarterfinals
10	(Australia) John Newcombe	6^{3}	2
3	(Netherlands) Tom Okker	7^{7}	6

==== Section 4 ====
First Round
(United States) John Fort	1	1
(Colombia) Iván Molina	6	6
(Canada) Mike Belkin	6	6
9	(Italy) Adriano Panatta	4	3
(United States) Erik van Dillen	6^{6}	6	6
(United States) Harold Solomon	7^{8}	2	2
(Australia) Geoff Masters	3	0
6	(Australia) Rod Laver	6	6
(France) Georges Goven	4	6	4
(Pakistan) Haroon Rahim	6	1	6
(France) Patrice Dominguez	1	6	6
12	(United States) Cliff Richey	6	3	4
(Czechoslovakia) Jiří Hřebec	6	4
(Rhodesia) Andrew Pattison	7	6
(Spain) Antonio Muñoz	4	1
2	(United States) Arthur Ashe	6	6

Second Round
(Colombia) Iván Molina	6	6
(Canada) Mike Belkin	4	2
(United States) Erik van Dillen	0	5
6	(Australia) Rod Laver	6	7
(Pakistan) Haroon Rahim	1	6	3
(France) Patrice Dominguez	6	3	6
(Rhodesia) Andrew Pattison	4	6	6
2	(United States) Arthur Ashe	6	2	7

Third Round
(Colombia) Iván Molina	4	6	6
6	(Australia) Rod Laver	6	2	3
(France) Patrice Dominguez	5	6	3
2	(United States) Arthur Ashe	7	1	6

Quarterfinals
(Colombia) Iván Molina	6	6
2	(United States) Arthur Ashe	4	3
