= 1973 Rothmans Canadian Open – Men's doubles =

Men's doubles
- 1973 Rothmans Canadian Open

Final
- Champion: (Australia) Rod Laver (Australia) Ken Rosewall
- Runner-up: (Australia) Owen Davidson (Australia) John Newcombe

Details
- Draw: 32
- Seeds: 4

Events
Singles	men	women
Doubles	men	women
← 1972 ·	Canadian Open	· 1974 →

The 1973 Rothmans Canadian Open – Men's doubles was an event of the 1973 Rothmans Canadian Open tennis tournament that was played at the Toronto Lawn Tennis Club in Toronto in Canada rom August 20 through August 26, 1973. The draw comprised 32 teams of which four were seeded. Ilie Năstase and Ion Țiriac were the defending champion but did not participate in this edition. Third-seeded Rod Laver and Ken Rosewall won the doubles title, defeating unseeded Owen Davidson and John Newcombe in the final, 7–5, 7–6.

== Seeds ==
1. (Netherlands) Tom Okker / (United States) Marty Riessen (first round)
2. (United States) Stan Smith / (United States) Erik van Dillen (first round, withdrew)
3. (Australia) Rod Laver / (Australia) Ken Rosewall (champions)
4. (Australia) Bob Carmichael / (South Africa) Frew McMillan (quarterfinals)

== Draw ==
=== Key ===
- Q = Qualifier
- WC = Wild card
- LL = Lucky loser
- Alt = Alternate
- SE = Special exempt
- PR = Protected ranking
- ITF = ITF entry
- JE = Junior exempt
- w/o = Walkover
- r = Retired
- d = Defaulted
- SR = Special ranking

=== Finals ===
Semifinals
(Chile) Patricio Cornejo (Chile) Jaime Fillol	3	7^{7}	3
3	(Australia) Rod Laver (Australia) Ken Rosewall	6	6^{4}	6
(Australia) Owen Davidson (Australia) John Newcombe	6	7^{7}
(United Kingdom) Gerald Battrick (United Kingdom) Graham Stilwell	4	6^{1}

Final
3	(Australia) Rod Laver (Australia) Ken Rosewall	7	7
(Australia) Owen Davidson (Australia) John Newcombe	5	6

=== Top half ===
First Round
1	(Netherlands) Tom Okker (United States) Marty Riessen	6	4	2
(Spain) Antonio Muñoz (Spain) Manuel Orantes	4	6	6
(Sweden) Björn Borg (Sweden) Rolf Norberg	6^{9}	6	2
(Canada) Mike Belkin (United States) Eddie Dibbs	7^{11}	3	6
(Chile) Patricio Cornejo (Chile) Jaime Fillol	6	6
(Canada) David Brown (Canada) Chris Burr	4	3
(Australia) Dick Crealy (Rhodesia) Andrew Pattison	6	7
(United States) Mike Estep (Czech Republic) Milan Holeček	3	6
3	(Australia) Rod Laver (Australia) Ken Rosewall	6	6
(Canada) Don McCormick (United States) Harold Solomon	0	2
(United States) John Fort (Czech Republic) Jiří Hřebec	3	5
(France) Jean-Baptiste Chanfreau (France) Georges Goven	6	7
(Australia) John Alexander (Australia) Phil Dent	6	2	6
(United States) Arthur Ashe (United States) Frank Froehling	4	6	4
(Pakistan) Haroon Rahim (Argentina) Guillermo Vilas	6	6
(France) Patrice Dominguez (France) Patrick Proisy	4	4

Second Round
(Spain) Antonio Muñoz (Spain) Manuel Orantes	6	6
(Canada) Mike Belkin (United States) Eddie Dibbs	4	4
(Chile) Patricio Cornejo (Chile) Jaime Fillol	4	7^{7}	6
(Australia) Dick Crealy (Rhodesia) Andrew Pattison	6	6^{4}	3
3	(Australia) Rod Laver (Australia) Ken Rosewall	5	6	6
(France) Jean-Baptiste Chanfreau (France) Georges Goven	7	0	2
(Australia) John Alexander (Australia) Phil Dent	6	4
(Pakistan) Haroon Rahim (Argentina) Guillermo Vilas	7	6

Quarterfinals
(Spain) Antonio Muñoz (Spain) Manuel Orantes	6^{3}	3
(Chile) Patricio Cornejo (Chile) Jaime Fillol	7^{7}	6
3	(Australia) Rod Laver (Australia) Ken Rosewall	7^{8}	7
(Pakistan) Haroon Rahim (Argentina) Guillermo Vilas	6^{6}	6

Semifinals
(Chile) Patricio Cornejo (Chile) Jaime Fillol	3	7^{7}	3
3	(Australia) Rod Laver (Australia) Ken Rosewall	6	6^{4}	6

=== Bottom half ===
First Round
(Sweden) Ove Bengtson (United States) Jim McManus	4	7	2
(Australia) Ian Fletcher (United States) Charlie Pasarell	6	5	6
(Canada) Tony Bardsley (Canada) Keith Carpenter	6	3
(Australia) Owen Davidson (Australia) John Newcombe	7	6
(United Kingdom) Mark Cox (Egypt) Ismail El Shafei	6	4	5
(Australia) Ross Case (Australia) Geoff Masters	1	6	7
(France) Wanaro N'Godrella (South Africa) Terry Ryan	4	6	4
4	(Australia) Bob Carmichael (South Africa) Frew McMillan	6	2	6
(South Africa) Pat Cramer (South Africa) Ray Moore	5	2
(Italy) Corrado Barazzutti (Italy) Tonino Zugarelli	7	6
(United Kingdom) Gerald Battrick (United Kingdom) Graham Stilwell	6^{4}	6	6
(South Africa) Cliff Drysdale (Socialist Federal Republic of Yugoslavia) Nikola Pilić	7^{7}	0	4
(Italy) Paolo Bertolucci (Italy) Adriano Panatta	0	2
(United States) Jeff Borowiak (Mexico) Raúl Ramírez	6	6
(Venezuela) Humphrey Hose (Colombia) Iván Molina	w/o
2	(United States) Stan Smith (United States) Erik van Dillen

Second Round
(Australia) Ian Fletcher (United States) Charlie Pasarell	1	0
(Australia) Owen Davidson (Australia) John Newcombe	6	6
(Australia) Ross Case (Australia) Geoff Masters	2	6^{3}
4	(Australia) Bob Carmichael (South Africa) Frew McMillan	6	7^{7}
(Italy) Corrado Barazzutti (Italy) Tonino Zugarelli	1	1
(United Kingdom) Gerald Battrick (United Kingdom) Graham Stilwell	6	6
(United States) Jeff Borowiak (Mexico) Raúl Ramírez	6	6
(Venezuela) Humphrey Hose (Colombia) Iván Molina	1	4

Quarterfinals
(Australia) Owen Davidson (Australia) John Newcombe	6	3	7
4	(Australia) Bob Carmichael (South Africa) Frew McMillan	4	6	5
(United Kingdom) Gerald Battrick (United Kingdom) Graham Stilwell	6	6
(United States) Jeff Borowiak (Mexico) Raúl Ramírez	3	4

Semifinals
(Australia) Owen Davidson (Australia) John Newcombe	6	7^{7}
(United Kingdom) Gerald Battrick (United Kingdom) Graham Stilwell	4	6^{1}
