= 1973 U.S. Pro Tennis Championships – Singles =

Singles
- 1973 U.S. Pro Tennis Championships

Final
- Champion: (United States) Jimmy Connors
- Runner-up: (United States) Arthur Ashe
- Score: 6–3, 4–6, 6–4, 3–6, 6–2

Details
- Draw: 32
- Seeds: 2

Events
Singles	Doubles
← 1972 ·	U.S. Pro Tennis Championships	· 1974 →

The 1973 U.S. Pro Tennis Championships – Singles was an event of the 1973 U.S. Pro Tennis Championships tennis tournament and was played on outdoor hard courts at the Longwood Cricket Club in Chestnut Hill, Massachusetts in the United States between July 16 and July 23, 1973. The draw comprised 32 players and two of them were seeded. Bob Lutz was the defending U.S. Pro Tennis Championships champion but withdrew from his first-round match against Brian Gottfried. Jimmy Connors won the title by defeating second-seeded Arthur Ashe 6–3, 4–6, 6–4, 3–6, 6–2 in the final.

== Seeds ==
1. (United States) Stan Smith (first round)
2. (United States) Arthur Ashe (final)

== Draw ==
=== Key ===
- Q = Qualifier
- WC = Wild card
- LL = Lucky loser
- Alt = Alternate
- SE = Special exempt
- PR = Protected ranking
- ITF = ITF entry
- JE = Junior exempt
- w/o = Walkover
- r = Retired
- d = Defaulted
- SR = Special ranking

=== Finals ===
Semifinals
(United States) Jimmy Connors	6	6
(United States) Cliff Richey	0	2
(United States) Clark Graebner	3	5
2	(United States) Arthur Ashe	6	7

Final
(United States) Jimmy Connors	6	4	6	3	6
2	(United States) Arthur Ashe	3	6	4	6	2

=== Top half ===
First Round
1	(United States) Stan Smith	3	3
(United States) Jimmy Connors	6	6
(Chile) Jaime Fillol	6	6^{3}	5
(South Africa) Ray Moore	2	7^{7}	7
(United States) Dick Stockton	7^{7}	6
(Australia) Dick Crealy	6^{5}	1
(Australia) Bob Carmichael	4	2
(Croatia) Nikola Pilić	6	6
(United States) Marty Riessen	6	7
(Egypt) Ismail El Shafei	1	5
(United Kingdom) Gerald Battrick	7^{8}	4	1
(United States) Paul Gerken	6^{6}	6	6
(United States) Cliff Richey	7^{7}	6
(Pakistan) Haroon Rahim	6^{2}	1
(United States) Doug Crawford	3	6^{3}
(Zimbabwe) Andrew Pattison	6	7^{7}

Second Round
(United States) Jimmy Connors	6	2	6
(South Africa) Ray Moore	1	6	3
(United States) Dick Stockton	7^{7}	6
(Croatia) Nikola Pilić	6^{5}	3
(United States) Marty Riessen	6	7
(United States) Paul Gerken	4	5
(United States) Cliff Richey	6	6
(Zimbabwe) Andrew Pattison	2	4

Quarterfinals
(United States) Jimmy Connors	6	6
(United States) Dick Stockton	4	4
(United States) Marty Riessen	4	6	6
(United States) Cliff Richey	6	1	7

Semifinals
(United States) Jimmy Connors	6	6
(United States) Cliff Richey	0	2

=== Bottom half ===
First Round
(United States) Clark Graebner	6	6
(United States) Paul Sullivan	1	2
(United States) Erik van Dillen	2	6	6
(United States) Tom Gorman	6	4	1
(United States) Brian Gottfried	w/o
(United States) Bob Lutz
(United States) Jeff Borowiak	4	7^{7}	4
(Australia) John Alexander	6	6^{5}	6
(United Kingdom) Graham Stilwell	6	6^{8}	6
(United States) Mike Estep	3	7^{10}	2
(United States) Eddie Dibbs	2	4
(United States) Roscoe Tanner	6	6
(United States) Charlie Pasarell	6	6
(Australia) Phil Dent	4	4
(United States) Harold Solomon	6^{4}	6	3
2	(United States) Arthur Ashe	7^{7}	2	6

Second Round
(United States) Clark Graebner	6	6
(United States) Erik van Dillen	4	1
(United States) Brian Gottfried	6^{3}	6	4
(Australia) John Alexander	7^{7}	3	6
(United Kingdom) Graham Stilwell	4	4
(United States) Roscoe Tanner	6	6
(United States) Charlie Pasarell	3	1
2	(United States) Arthur Ashe	6	6

Quarterfinals
(United States) Clark Graebner	7	6
(Australia) John Alexander	5	4
(United States) Roscoe Tanner	6	4	5
2	(United States) Arthur Ashe	4	6	7

Semifinals
(United States) Clark Graebner	3	5
2	(United States) Arthur Ashe	6	7
