= Franklin Robbins =

American tennis player

- Full name: Franklin Dale Robbins
- Country (sports): United States
- Born: June 13, 1950 Utah
- Height: 6’1”

Singles
- Career record: 9–32
- Highest ranking: No. 182 (August 23, 1973)

Grand Slam singles results
- US Open: 3R (1967)

Franklin Dale Robbins (June 13, 1950) was an American tennis player. He reached a career high ranking of 182 and appeared at the 1969 US Open.
