= Vijay Amritraj =

Indian sports commentator, actor, and tennis player

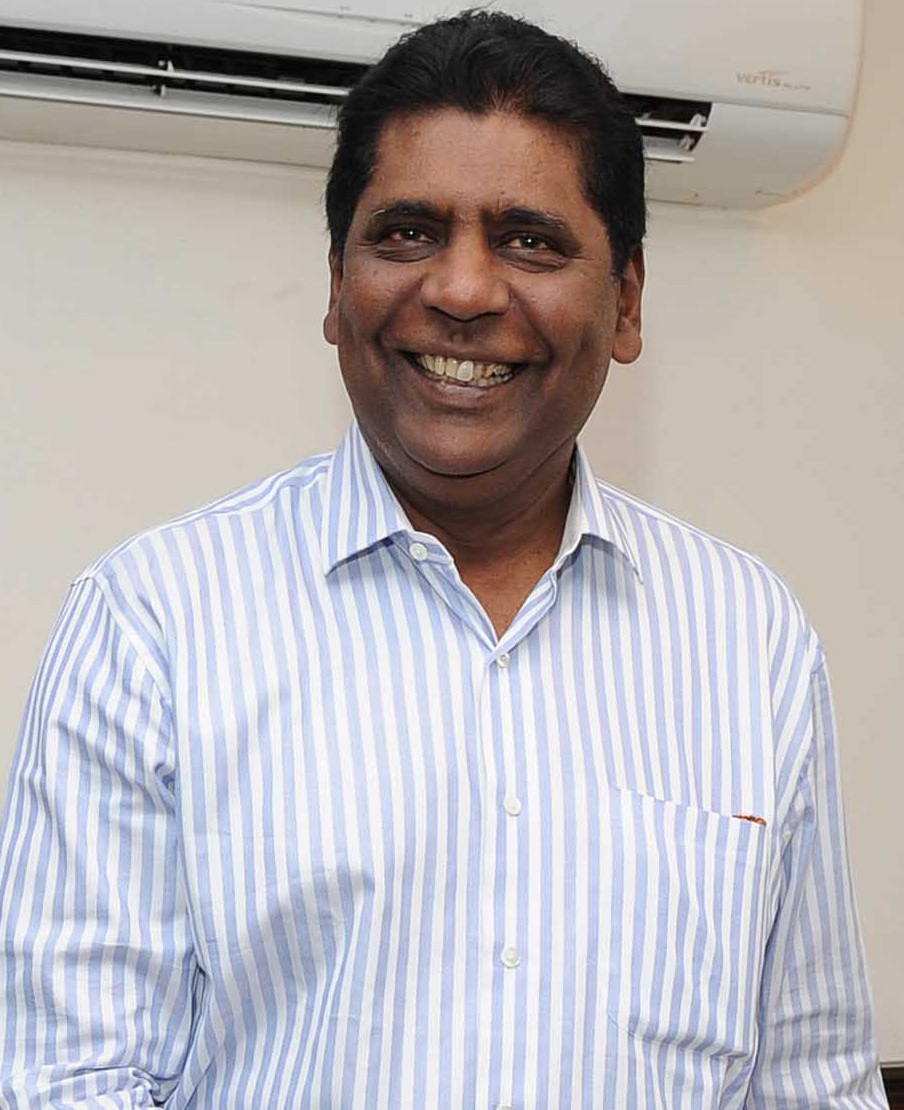
- Amritraj in 2017
- Country (sports): India
- Residence: Southern California, U.S.
- Born: 14 December 1953 (age 72) Madras, Madras State, India
- Height: 6 ft 4 in (1.93 m)
- Turned pro: 1970
- Retired: 1993
- Plays: Right-handed (one-handed backhand)
- Prize money: $1,331,913
- Int. Tennis HoF: 2024 (member page)

Singles
- Career record: 399–308
- Career titles: 15
- Highest ranking: No. 18 (7 July 1980)

Grand Slam singles results
- Australian Open: 2R (1984)
- French Open: 3R (1974)
- Wimbledon: QF (1973, 1981)
- US Open: QF (1973, 1974)

Other tournaments
- WCT Finals: SF (1982)

Doubles
- Career record: 264–218
- Career titles: 14
- Highest ranking: No. 23 (24 March 1980)

Grand Slam doubles results
- Wimbledon: SF (1976)
- US Open: QF (1973, 1976)

Team competitions
- Davis Cup: F (1974, 1987)

Vijay Amritraj (Tamil pronunciation: [ˈʋɪdʒaɪ amrit̪ˈɾaːdʒ]; born 14 December 1953) is an Indian retired professional tennis player, sports commentator and actor. He was awarded the Padma Shri (India's fourth-highest civilian honour), in 1983, and the Padma Bhushan (India's third-highest civilian honour) in 2026. In 2022, he was honored for his contributions to tennis in London by the International Tennis Hall of Fame and International Tennis Federation. On July 20, 2024 he was inducted into the International Tennis Hall of Fame in Newport, Rhode Island.

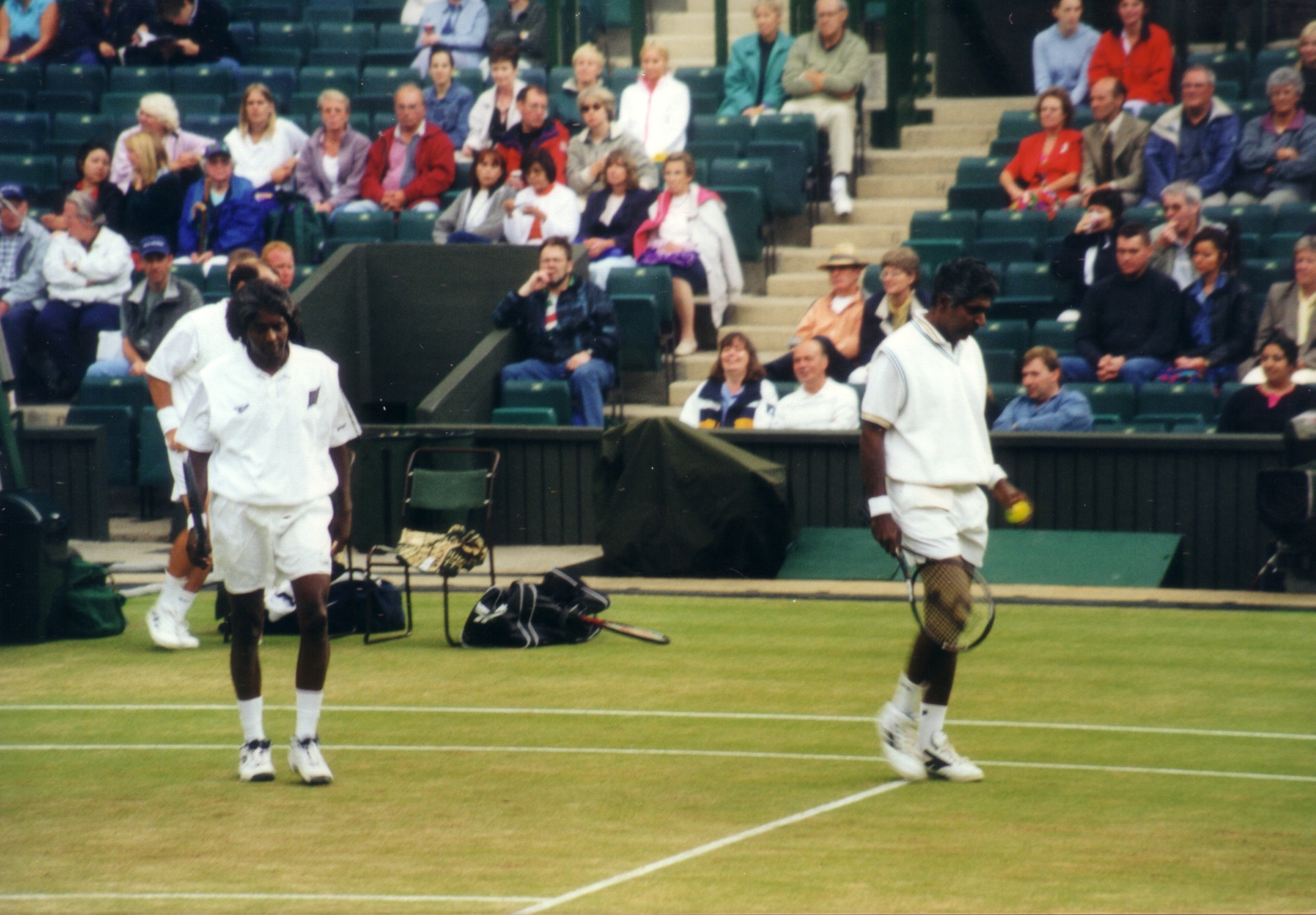
Vijay Amritraj partnering brother Anand at the 2000 Wimbledon Championships

== Early life ==
Vijay was born in Madras, India, to a Tamil Christian Nadar family, consisting of parents Maggie Dhairyam and Robert Amritraj, and brothers Anand Amritraj and Ashok Amritraj, who were also international tennis players.

== Career ==
After playing his first Grand Prix event in 1970, Amritraj achieved his first success in singles in 1973 when he reached the quarterfinals at two Grand Slam events. At Wimbledon, he lost in five sets to the eventual champion Jan Kodeš and later that summer at the US Open, lost to Ken Rosewall after having beaten Rod Laver two rounds earlier.

Amritraj beat Björn Borg in the second round in the US Open in 1974, losing to Rosewall in quarterfinals. In 1979, he lost in the second round of Wimbledon to defending champion Borg after being up two sets to one and leading 4–1 in the fourth set. He reached his career-high ranking in singles of world No. 16 in July 1980. In 1981, he reached the quarterfinals of Wimbledon before losing in five sets to Jimmy Connors. He beat John McEnroe in the first round of Cincinnati Masters in 1984. Overall, he had five career wins over Jimmy Connors in their eleven matches.

Amritraj was part of the India Davis Cup team that reached the finals in 1974 and 1987. Amritraj had a career singles win–loss record 405–312, winning 15 singles and 13 doubles titles.

== Acting career ==
Amritraj has also pursued an acting career. His best known role is probably as the MI6 intelligence operative Vijay in the 1983 James Bond film Octopussy. He also appeared briefly in Star Trek IV: The Voyage Home (1986) as starship captain Joel Randolph.

He was also a regular character in the NBC TV series The Last Precinct and the Yakov Smirnoff comedy What a Country!, as well as a guest star on various television shows such as Hart to Hart. He has since gone on to become a sports commentator, has been a judge at the Miss Universe pageant, and has developed a multimedia business. Amritraj also hosts a talk show named Dimensions with Vijay Amritraj broadcast on CNN-IBN.

== Personal life ==
Amritraj lives in Southern California with his wife Shyamala and sons Prakash Amritraj and Vikram.

Prakash and his paternal cousin Stephen Amritraj are also professional tennis players.

On 9 February 2001, Vijay was appointed a United Nations Messenger of Peace. He has been raising awareness on the issues of drugs and HIV/AIDS and has raised funds to fight the spread of AIDS worldwide.

https://vijayamritrajfoundation.net

He founded The Vijay Amritraj Foundation in 2006.

== Filmography ==
Film
Year	Title	Role	Notes
1983	Octopussy	Vijay	
1985	Nine Deaths of the Ninja	Rankin	
1986	Star Trek IV: The Voyage Home	Starship Captain Joel Randolph	

== Career statistics ==
=== Singles performance timeline ===
Key
W	F	SF	QF	#R	RR	Q#	P#	DNQ	A	Z#	PO	G	S	B	NMS	NTI	P	NH

(W) winner; (F) finalist; (SF) semifinalist; (QF) quarterfinalist; (#R) rounds 4, 3, 2, 1; (RR) round-robin stage; (Q#) qualification round; (P#) preliminary round; (DNQ) did not qualify; (A) absent; (Z#) Davis/Fed Cup Zonal Group (with number indication) or (PO) play-off; (G) gold, (S) silver or (B) bronze Olympic/Paralympic medal; (NMS) not a Masters tournament; (NTI) not a Tier I tournament; (P) postponed; (NH) not held; (SR) strike rate (events won / competed); (W–L) win–loss record.

Tournament	1972	1973	1974	1975	1976	1977	1978	1979	1980	1981	1982	1983	1984	1985	1986	1987	1988	1989	1990	SR
Australian Open	A	A	A	A	A	A	A	A	A	A	A	1R	2R	A	A	A	A	A	A	0 / 2
French Open	A	A	3R	A	A	A	A	A	A	A	A	A	A	A	A	A	A	A	A	0 / 1
Wimbledon	2R	QF	2R	2R	2R	2R	2R	2R	1R	QF	3R	1R	1R	4R	1R	2R	A	A	1R	0 / 17
US Open	1R	QF	QF	2R	1R	1R	1R	2R	3R	3R	A	A	2R	1R	A	A	A	A	A	0 / 12

== Career finals ==
Legend
Grand Slam (0)
Grand Prix Super Series (0)
Grand Prix Circuit (15)

=== Singles: 27 (19 titles / 8 runner-ups) ===
Result	W/L	Date	Tournament	Surface	Opponent	Score
Win	1–0	Jul 1973	Bretton Woods, U.S.	Clay	(United States) Jimmy Connors	7–5, 2–6, 7–5
Loss	1–1	Aug 1973	South Orange, U.S.	Grass	(Australia) Colin Dibley	4–6, 7–6, 4–6
Win	2–1	Oct 1973	New Delhi, India	Grass	(Australia) Mal Anderson	6–4, 5–7, 8–9, 6–3, 11–9
Loss	2–2	Mar 1974	Tempe, U.S.	Hard	(United States) Jimmy Connors	1–6, 2–6
Win	3–2	Jun 1974	Beckenham, England	Grass	(United States) Tom Gorman	6–7, 6–2, 6–4
Win	4–2	Aug 1975	Columbus, U.S.	Hard	(United States) Bob Lutz	6–4, 7–5
Win	5–2	Nov 1975	Calcutta, India	Clay	(Spain) Manuel Orantes	7–5, 6–3
Win	6–2	Mar 1976	Memphis, U.S.	Carpet (i)	(United States) Stan Smith	6–2, 0–6, 6–0
Win	7–2	Sep 1976	Newport, U.S.	Grass	(United States) Brian Teacher	6–3, 4–6, 6–3, 6–1
Win	8–2	Jan 1977	Auckland, New Zealand	Grass	(United States) Tim Wilkison	7–6, 5–7, 6–1, 6–2
Win	9–2	Nov 1977	Bombay, India	Clay	(United States) Terry Moor	7–6, 6–4
Win	10–2	Sep 1978	Mexico City, Mexico	Carpet (i)	(Mexico) Raúl Ramírez	6–4, 6–4
Loss	10–3	Oct 1978	Cologne, West Germany	Hard (i)	(Poland) Wojciech Fibak	2–6, 1–0 ret.
Win	11–3	Nov 1979	Bombay, India	Clay	(West Germany) Peter Elter	6–1, 7–5
Loss	11–4	Feb 1980	WCT Invitational Salisbury, U.S.	Carpet (i)	(Sweden) Björn Borg	5–7, 1–6, 3–6
Loss	11–5	Mar 1980	Milan, Italy	Carpet (i)	(United States) John McEnroe	2–6, 4–6
Win	12–5	Jul 1980	Newport, U.S.	Grass	(Zimbabwe) Andrew Pattison	6–1, 5–7, 6–3
Win	13–5	Nov 1980	Bangkok, Thailand	Carpet (i)	(United States) Brian Teacher	6–3, 7–5
Loss	13–6	Dec 1980	WCT Challenge Cup, Canada	Carpet (i)	(United States) John McEnroe	1–6, 6–2, 1–6
Loss	13–7	Mar 1981	Salisbury WCT, U.S.	Carpet (i)	(United States) Bill Scanlon	6-3, 2-2, 4-6, 6-3, 4-6
Loss	13–8	Aug 1983	Stowe, U.S.	Hard	(Australia) John Fitzgerald	6–3, 2–6, 5–7
Win	14–8	Jul 1984	Newport, U.S.	Grass	(United States) Tim Mayotte	3–6, 6–4, 6–4
Win	15–8	Jun 1986	Bristol, England	Grass	(France) Henri Leconte	7–6, 1–6, 8–6

=== Doubles: 29 (13 titles / 15 runner-ups) ===
Result	W/L	Date	Tournament	Surface	Partner	Opponents	Score
Loss	0–1	Oct 1973	New Delhi, India		(India) Anand Amritraj	(United States) Jim McManus (Mexico) Raúl Ramírez	2–6, 4–6
Win	1–1	Nov 1974	Bombay, India	Clay	(India) Anand Amritraj	(Australia) Dick Crealy (New Zealand) Onny Parun	6–4, 7–6
Loss	1–2	Aug 1974	South Orange, U.S.	Hard	(India) Anand Amritraj	(United States) Brian Gottfried (Mexico) Raúl Ramírez	6–7, 7–6, 6–7
Win	2–2	Aug 1974	Columbus, U.S.	Hard	(India) Anand Amritraj	(United States) Tom Gorman (United States) Bob Lutz	walkover
Loss	2–3	Feb 1975	Toronto, Canada	Carpet (i)	(India) Anand Amritraj	(United States) Dick Stockton (United States) Erik van Dillen	4–6, 5–7, 1–6
Loss	2–4	Mar 1975	Washington D.C., U.S.	Carpet (i)	(India) Anand Amritraj	(United States) Mike Estep (New Zealand) Jeff Simpson	6–7^{5}, 3–6
Win	3–4	Mar 1975	Atlanta, U.S.	Carpet (i)	(India) Anand Amritraj	(United Kingdom) Mark Cox (South Africa) Cliff Drysdale	6–3, 6–2
Loss	3–5	Aug 1975	Louisville, U.S.	Clay	(India) Anand Amritraj	(Poland) Wojciech Fibak (Argentina) Guillermo Vilas	(not played)
Win	4–5	Sep 1975	Los Angeles, U.S.	Hard	(India) Anand Amritraj	(South Africa) Cliff Drysdale (United States) Marty Riessen	7–6, 4–6, 6–4
Loss	4–6	Nov 1975	Calcutta, India	Clay	(India) Anand Amritraj	(Spain) Juan Gisbert (Spain) Manuel Orantes	6–1, 4–6, 3–6
Win	5–6	Mar 1976	Memphis, U.S.	Carpet (i)	(India) Anand Amritraj	(United States) Roscoe Tanner (United States) Marty Riessen	6–3, 6–4
Loss	5–7	Mar 1977	St. Louis, U.S.	Carpet (i)	(United States) Dick Stockton	(Romania) Ilie Năstase (Italy) Adriano Panatta	4–6, 6–3, 6–7^{6}
Loss	5–8	Mar 1977	Rotterdam, Netherlands	Carpet (i)	(United States) Dick Stockton	(Poland) Wojciech Fibak (Netherlands) Tom Okker	4–6, 4–6
Win	6–8	May 1977	Masters Doubles WCT, U.S.	Carpet (i)	(United States) Dick Stockton	(United States) Vitas Gerulaitis (Italy) Adriano Panatta	7–6, 7–6, 4–6, 6–3
Win	7–8	Jun 1977	London, England	Grass	(India) Anand Amritraj	(United Kingdom) David Lloyd (United Kingdom) John Lloyd	6–1, 6–2
Win	8–8	Sep 1978	Mexico City, Mexico	Carpet (i)	(India) Anand Amritraj	(United States) Fred McNair (Mexico) Raúl Ramírez	6–4, 7–5
Loss	8–9	Apr 1979	Cairo, Egypt	Clay	(India) Anand Amritraj	(Australia) Peter McNamara (Australia) Paul McNamee	5–7, 4–6
Loss	8–10	Jul 1979	Louisville, U.S.	Hard	(Mexico) Raúl Ramírez	(United States) Marty Riessen (United States) Sherwood Stewart	2–6, 6–1, 1–6
Loss	8–11	Oct 1979	Sydney, Australia	Hard	(United States) Pat DuPré	(Australia) Rod Frawley (Paraguay) Francisco González	walkover
Win	9–11	Mar 1980	Rotterdam, Netherlands	Carpet (i)	(United States) Stan Smith	(United States) Bill Scanlon (United States) Brian Teacher	6–4, 6–3
Win	10–11	Mar 1980	Frankfurt, West Germany	Carpet (i)	(United States) Stan Smith	(Southern Rhodesia) Andrew Pattison (United States) Butch Walts	6–7, 6–2, 6–2
Loss	10–12	Aug 1981	Columbus, U.S.	Hard	(India) Anand Amritraj	(United States) Bruce Manson (United States) Brian Teacher	1–6, 1–6
Loss	10–13	Nov 1982	Baltimore, Maryland, U.S.	Carpet (i)	(Australia) Fred Stolle	(India) Anand Amritraj (United States) Tony Giammalva	5–7, 2–6
Win	11–13	Nov 1982	Chicago, U.S.	Carpet (i)	(India) Anand Amritraj	(United States) Mike Cahill (United States) Bruce Manson	3–6, 6–3, 6–3
Win	12–13	Jul 1983	Newport, U.S.	Grass	(Australia) John Fitzgerald	(United States) Tim Gullikson (United States) Tom Gullikson	6–3, 6–4
Loss	12–14	Aug 1983	Columbus, U.S.	Hard	(Australia) John Fitzgerald	(United States) Scott Davis (United States) Brian Teacher	1–6, 6–4, 6–7
Loss	12–15	Oct 1984	Stockholm, Sweden	Hard (i)	(Romania) Ilie Năstase	(France) Henri Leconte (Czechoslovakia) Tomáš Šmíd	6–3, 6–7, 4–6
Win	13–15	Jul 1986	Newport, U.S.	Grass	(United States) Tim Wilkison	(South Africa) Eddie Edwards (Paraguay) Francisco González	4–6, 7–5, 7–6

Awards
First	ATP Most Improved Player; 1973	Succeeded by Guillermo Vilas
