= 1974 Grand Prix (tennis) =

Tennis circuit

1974 Grand Prix tour
Details
- Duration: 26 December 1973 – 10 December 1974
- Edition: 5th
- Tournaments: 49
- Categories: TC events (3); GPM events (1); AA events (12); A events (6); B events (17); C events (10)

Achievements (singles)
- Most titles: (United States) Jimmy Connors (7) (Argentina) Guillermo Vilas (7)
- Most finals: (United States) Jimmy Connors (8)
- Prize money leader: (Argentina) Guillermo Vilas ($219,844)
- Points leader: (Argentina) Guillermo Vilas (746)

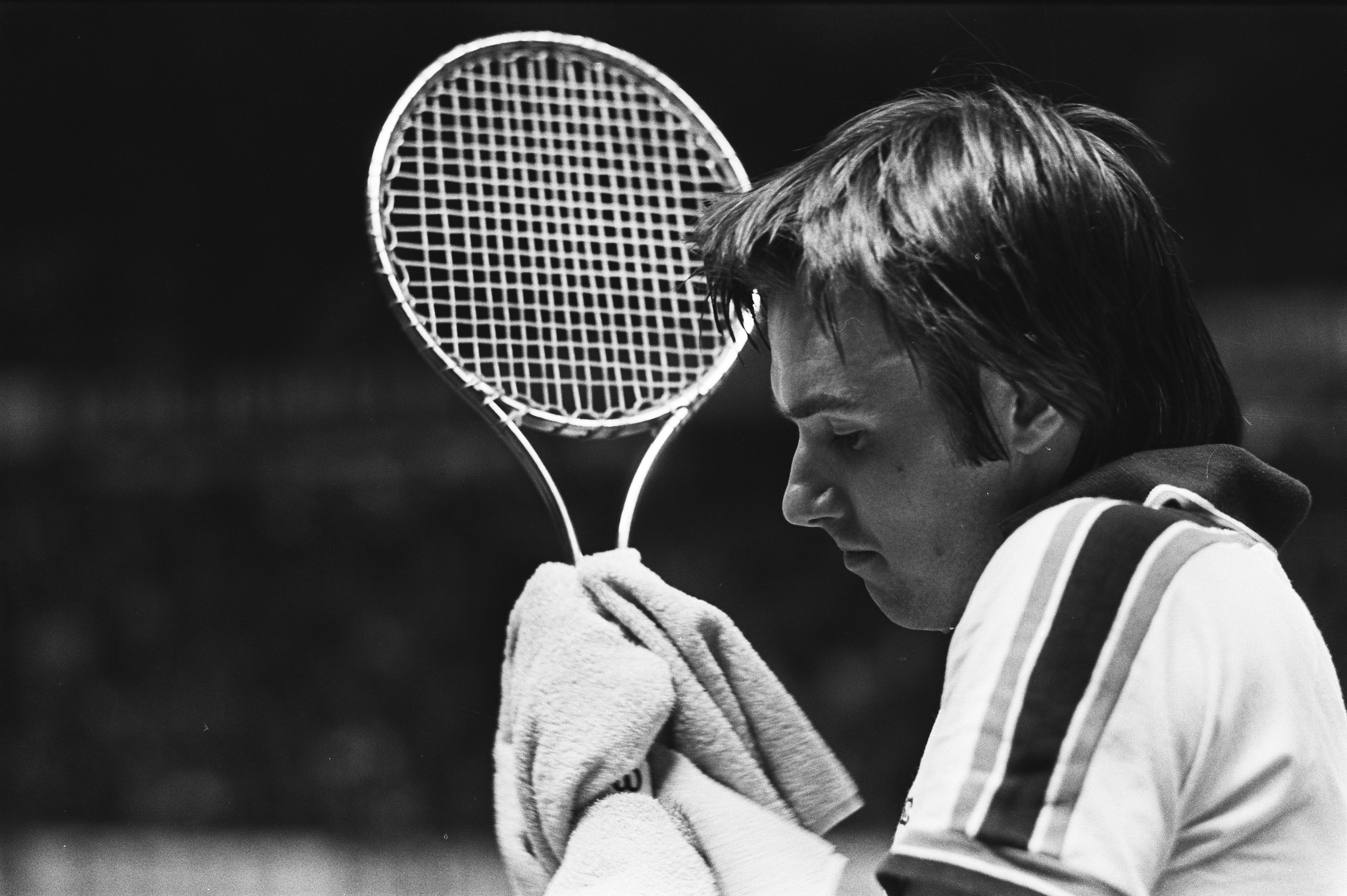
Jimmy Connors finished the year as ATP world No. 1 for the first time in his career. Connors won seven titles during the season, including three majors at the Australian Open, Wimbledon Championships, and the US Open (though the Australian Open was a Group B event rather than a Triple Crown event like the other majors).

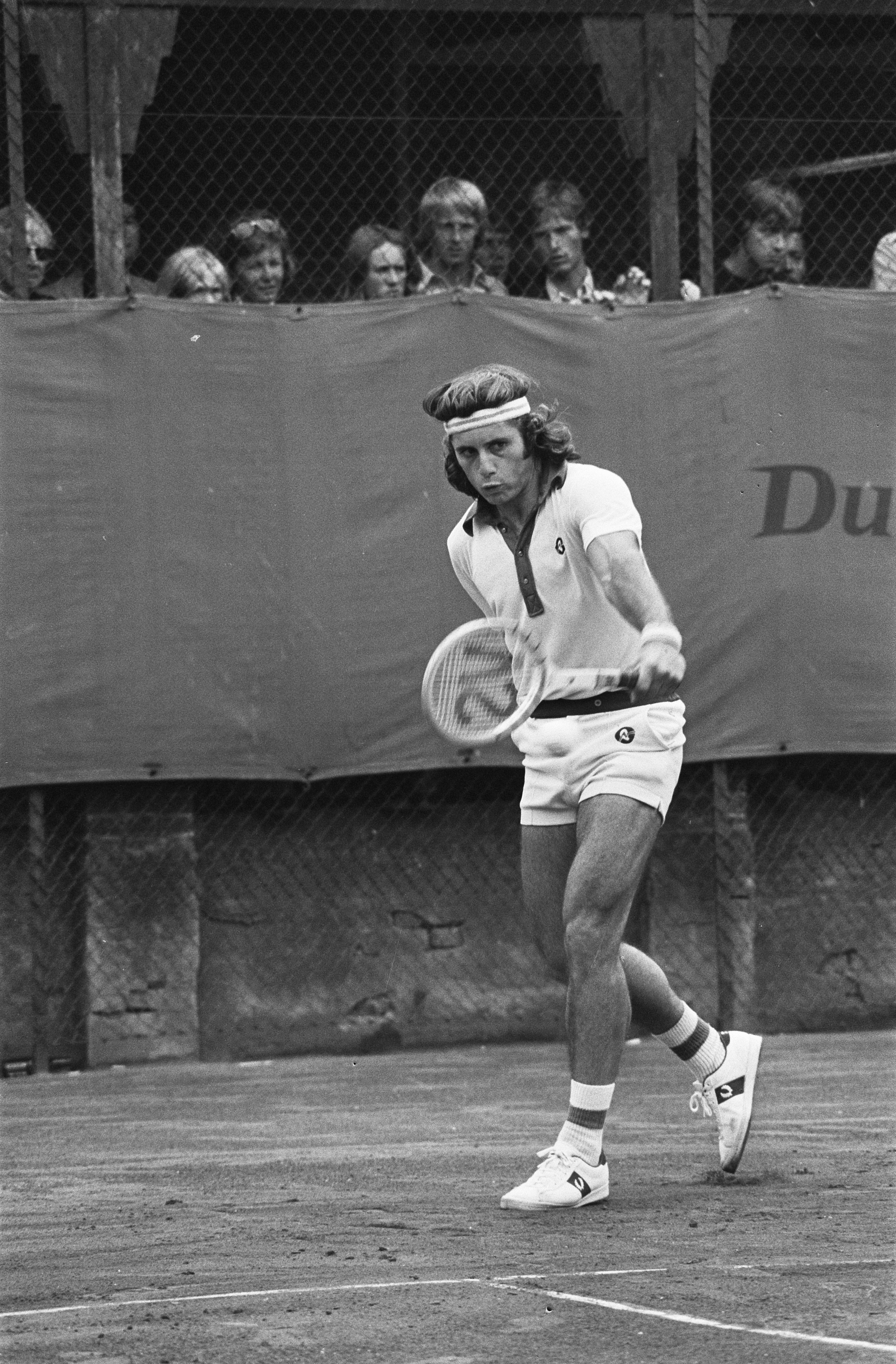
Guillermo Vilas was the 1974 Grand Prix No. 1. Vilas won seven tournaments during the season, including the Masters Grand Prix.

The 1974 Commercial Union Assurance Grand Prix was a professional tennis circuit administered by the International Lawn Tennis Federation (ILTF) which served as a forerunner to the current Association of Tennis Professionals (ATP) World Tour and the Women's Tennis Association (WTA) Tour. The circuit consisted of the four modern Grand Slam tournaments and open tournaments recognised by the ILTF. The season-ending Commercial Union Assurance Masters and Davis Cup Final are included in this calendar but did not count towards the Grand Prix ranking.

== Schedule ==
The Grand Prix circuit was scheduled from May until December so that it would not to conflict with the competing World Championship Tennis circuit which ran from January until early May.

Key

Triple Crown
Grand Prix Masters
Group AA events
Group A events
Group B events
Group C events
Team events

=== December 1973 ===
Week	Tournament	Champions	Runners-up	Semifinalists	Quarterfinalists
26 Dec	Australian Open; Melbourne, Australia; Grand Slam; Group B Grass – $33,400 – 64S/35D; Singles – Doubles	(United States) Jimmy Connors; 7–6^{(9–7)}, 6–4, 4–6, 6–3	(Australia) Phil Dent	(Australia) Ross Case (Australia) John Alexander	(Australia) John Newcombe (Australia) Colin Dibley (Australia) Bob Giltinan (Czechoslovakia) Vladimir Zednik
26 Dec	Australian Open; Melbourne, Australia; Grand Slam; Group B Grass – $33,400 – 64S/35D; Singles – Doubles	(Australia) Ross Case (Australia) Geoff Masters; 6–7, 6–3, 6–4	(Australia) Syd Ball (Australia) Bob Giltinan	(Australia) Ross Case (Australia) John Alexander	(Australia) John Newcombe (Australia) Colin Dibley (Australia) Bob Giltinan (Czechoslovakia) Vladimir Zednik

=== May ===
Week	Tournament	Champions	Runners-up	Semifinalists	Quarterfinalists
6 May	Trofeo Vat 69; Florence, Italy; Group C Clay – $25,000 – 32S/16D; Singles – Doubles	(Italy) Adriano Panatta; 6–3, 6–1	(Italy) Paolo Bertolucci	(New Zealand) Onny Parun (Argentina) Julián Ganzábal	(New Zealand) Jeff Simpson (Sweden) Leif Johansson (Australia) Barry Phillips-Moore (Italy) Vincenzo Franchitti
6 May	Trofeo Vat 69; Florence, Italy; Group C Clay – $25,000 – 32S/16D; Singles – Doubles	(Italy) Paolo Bertolucci (Italy) Adriano Panatta; 6–3, 3–6, 6–4	(Hungary) Róbert Machán (Hungary) Balázs Taróczy	(New Zealand) Onny Parun (Argentina) Julián Ganzábal	(New Zealand) Jeff Simpson (Sweden) Leif Johansson (Australia) Barry Phillips-Moore (Italy) Vincenzo Franchitti
13 May	Bavarian Championships; Munich, West Germany; Group C Clay – 32S/16D; Singles – Doubles	(West Germany) Jürgen Fassbender; 6–2, 5–7, 6–1, 6–4	(France) François Jauffret	(Italy) Corrado Barazzutti (Italy) Adriano Panatta	(Romania) Ilie Năstase (Italy) Paolo Bertolucci (West Germany) Karl Meiler (Spain) Manuel Orantes
13 May	Bavarian Championships; Munich, West Germany; Group C Clay – 32S/16D; Singles – Doubles	(Spain) Antonio Muñoz (Spain) Manuel Orantes; 2–6, 6–4, 7–6, 6–2	(West Germany) Jürgen Fassbender (West Germany) Hans-Jürgen Pohmann	(Italy) Corrado Barazzutti (Italy) Adriano Panatta	(Romania) Ilie Năstase (Italy) Paolo Bertolucci (West Germany) Karl Meiler (Spain) Manuel Orantes
20 May	Rothmans British Hard Court; Championships; Bournemouth, Great Britain; Group B Clay – 50S/24D/32XD	(Romania) Ilie Năstase; 6–1, 6–3, 6–0	(Italy) Paolo Bertolucci	(Italy) Corrado Barazzutti (Austria) Hans Kary	(Colombia) Jairo Velasco (Australia) Dick Crealy (France) Patrice Dominguez (Argentina) Julián Ganzábal
20 May	Rothmans British Hard Court; Championships; Bournemouth, Great Britain; Group B Clay – 50S/24D/32XD	(Spain) Juan Gisbert Sr. (Romania) Ilie Năstase; 6–4, 6–2, 6–0	(Italy) Corrado Barazzutti (Italy) Paolo Bertolucci	(Italy) Corrado Barazzutti (Austria) Hans Kary	(Colombia) Jairo Velasco (Australia) Dick Crealy (France) Patrice Dominguez (Argentina) Julián Ganzábal
20 May	Rothmans British Hard Court; Championships; Bournemouth, Great Britain; Group B Clay – 50S/24D/32XD	(United Kingdom) Lesley Charles (United Kingdom) Mark Farrell; 6–1, 6–3	(United States) Sharon Walsh (United Kingdom) Stephen Warboys	(Italy) Corrado Barazzutti (Austria) Hans Kary	(Colombia) Jairo Velasco (Australia) Dick Crealy (France) Patrice Dominguez (Argentina) Julián Ganzábal
20 May	German Open; Hamburg, West Germany; Group B Clay – 36S/16D/16XD	(United States) Eddie Dibbs; 6–2, 6–2, 6–3	(West Germany) Hans-Joachim Plötz	(Argentina) Guillermo Vilas (Chile) Jaime Fillol	(France) François Jauffret (France) Patrick Proisy (Spain) Antonio Muñoz (Czechoslovakia) Jiří Hřebec
20 May	German Open; Hamburg, West Germany; Group B Clay – 36S/16D/16XD	(West Germany) Jürgen Fassbender (West Germany) Hans-Jürgen Pohmann; 6–3, 6–4, 6–4	(United States) Brian Gottfried (Mexico) Raúl Ramírez	(Argentina) Guillermo Vilas (Chile) Jaime Fillol	(France) François Jauffret (France) Patrick Proisy (Spain) Antonio Muñoz (Czechoslovakia) Jiří Hřebec
20 May	German Open; Hamburg, West Germany; Group B Clay – 36S/16D/16XD	(West Germany) Heide Orth (West Germany) Jürgen Fassbender; 7–6, 6–3	(West Germany) Katja Ebbinghaus (West Germany) Hans-Jürgen Pohmann	(Argentina) Guillermo Vilas (Chile) Jaime Fillol	(France) François Jauffret (France) Patrick Proisy (Spain) Antonio Muñoz (Czechoslovakia) Jiří Hřebec
27 May	Italian Open; Rome, Italy; Group AA; Clay – $90,000 – 64S/32D; Singles – Doubles	(Sweden) Björn Borg; 6–3, 6–4, 6–2	(Romania) Ilie Năstase	(United States) Stan Smith (Argentina) Guillermo Vilas	(Soviet Union) Alex Metreveli (United States) Brian Gottfried (Spain) Manuel Orantes (United States) Steve Krulevitz
27 May	Italian Open; Rome, Italy; Group AA; Clay – $90,000 – 64S/32D; Singles – Doubles	(United States) Brian Gottfried (Mexico) Raúl Ramírez; 6–3, 6–2, 6–3	(Spain) Juan Gisbert Sr. (Romania) Ilie Năstase	(United States) Stan Smith (Argentina) Guillermo Vilas	(Soviet Union) Alex Metreveli (United States) Brian Gottfried (Spain) Manuel Orantes (United States) Steve Krulevitz

=== June ===
Week	Tournament	Champions	Runners-up	Semifinalists	Quarterfinalists
3 Jun; 10 Jun	French Open; Paris, France; Grand Slam; Triple Crown; Clay – $150,000 – 128S/64D/32XD; Singles – Doubles – Mixed doubles	(Sweden) Björn Borg; 2–6, 6–7, 6–0, 6–1, 6–1	(Spain) Manuel Orantes	(United States) Harold Solomon (France) François Jauffret	(Romania) Ilie Năstase (Mexico) Raúl Ramírez (Chile) Patricio Cornejo (West Germany) Hans-Jürgen Pohmann
3 Jun; 10 Jun	French Open; Paris, France; Grand Slam; Triple Crown; Clay – $150,000 – 128S/64D/32XD; Singles – Doubles – Mixed doubles	(Australia) Dick Crealy (New Zealand) Onny Parun; 6–2, 6–2, 3–6, 5–7, 6–1	(United States) Bob Lutz (United States) Stan Smith	(United States) Harold Solomon (France) François Jauffret	(Romania) Ilie Năstase (Mexico) Raúl Ramírez (Chile) Patricio Cornejo (West Germany) Hans-Jürgen Pohmann
3 Jun; 10 Jun	French Open; Paris, France; Grand Slam; Triple Crown; Clay – $150,000 – 128S/64D/32XD; Singles – Doubles – Mixed doubles	(Czechoslovakia) Martina Navratilova (Colombia) Iván Molina; 6–3, 6–3	(France) Rosie Darmon (Mexico) Marcelo Lara|	(United States) Harold Solomon (France) François Jauffret	(Romania) Ilie Năstase (Mexico) Raúl Ramírez (Chile) Patricio Cornejo (West Germany) Hans-Jürgen Pohmann
17 Jun	John Player Open; Nottingham, Great Britain; Group AA; Grass – 62S/30D	(United States) Stan Smith; 6–3, 1–6, 6–3	(Soviet Union) Alex Metreveli	(United States) Roscoe Tanner (United States) Marty Riessen	(Czechoslovakia) Jan Kodeš (United States) Jimmy Connors (New Zealand) Onny Parun (United States) Tom Gorman
17 Jun	John Player Open; Nottingham, Great Britain; Group AA; Grass – 62S/30D	(United States) Charlie Pasarell (United States) Erik van Dillen; 9–7, 6–3	(United States) Bob Lutz (United States) Stan Smith	(United States) Roscoe Tanner (United States) Marty Riessen	(Czechoslovakia) Jan Kodeš (United States) Jimmy Connors (New Zealand) Onny Parun (United States) Tom Gorman
24 Jun; 1 Jul	Wimbledon Championships; London, Great Britain; Grand Slam; Triple Crown; Grass – $167,125 – 128S/64D/56XD; Singles – Doubles – Mixed doubles	(United States) Jimmy Connors; 6–1, 6–1, 6–4	(Australia) Ken Rosewall	(United States) Stan Smith (United States) Dick Stockton	(Australia) John Newcombe (Egypt) Ismail El Shafei (Czechoslovakia) Jan Kodeš (Soviet Union) Alex Metreveli
24 Jun; 1 Jul	Wimbledon Championships; London, Great Britain; Grand Slam; Triple Crown; Grass – $167,125 – 128S/64D/56XD; Singles – Doubles – Mixed doubles	(Australia) John Newcombe (Australia) Tony Roche; 8–6, 6–4, 6–4	(United States) Bob Lutz (United States) Stan Smith	(United States) Stan Smith (United States) Dick Stockton	(Australia) John Newcombe (Egypt) Ismail El Shafei (Czechoslovakia) Jan Kodeš (Soviet Union) Alex Metreveli
24 Jun; 1 Jul	Wimbledon Championships; London, Great Britain; Grand Slam; Triple Crown; Grass – $167,125 – 128S/64D/56XD; Singles – Doubles – Mixed doubles	(United States) Billie Jean King (Australia) Owen Davidson; 6–3, 9–7	(United Kingdom) Lesley Charles (United Kingdom) Mark Farrell	(United States) Stan Smith (United States) Dick Stockton	(Australia) John Newcombe (Egypt) Ismail El Shafei (Czechoslovakia) Jan Kodeš (Soviet Union) Alex Metreveli

=== July ===
Week	Tournament	Champions	Runners-up	Semifinalists	Quarterfinalists
8 Jul	Swedish Open; Båstad, Sweden; Group B Clay – $50,000 – 32S/16D; Singles – Doubles	(Sweden) Björn Borg; 6–3, 6–0, 6–7, 6–3	(Italy) Adriano Panatta	(New Zealand) Onny Parun (Italy) Paolo Bertolucci	(Italy) Corrado Barazzutti (Italy) Antonio Zugarelli (Sweden) Leif Johansson (Sweden) Jan-Erik Lundqvist
8 Jul	Swedish Open; Båstad, Sweden; Group B Clay – $50,000 – 32S/16D; Singles – Doubles	(Italy) Paolo Bertolucci (Italy) Adriano Panatta; 3–6, 6–2, 6–4	(Sweden) Ove Bengtson (Sweden) Björn Borg	(New Zealand) Onny Parun (Italy) Paolo Bertolucci	(Italy) Corrado Barazzutti (Italy) Antonio Zugarelli (Sweden) Leif Johansson (Sweden) Jan-Erik Lundqvist
8 Jul	Swiss Open; Gstaad, Switzerland; Group B Clay – $50,000 – 32S/16D; Singles – Doubles	(Argentina) Guillermo Vilas; 6–1, 6–2	(Spain) Manuel Orantes	(Australia) Roy Emerson (India) Vijay Amritraj	(Mexico) Marcelo Lara (Egypt) Ismail El Shafei (Australia) Barry Phillips-Moore (France) François Jauffret
8 Jul	Swiss Open; Gstaad, Switzerland; Group B Clay – $50,000 – 32S/16D; Singles – Doubles	(Spain) José Higueras (Spain) Manuel Orantes; 7–5, 0–6, 6–1, 9–8	(Australia) Roy Emerson (Brazil) Thomaz Koch	(Australia) Roy Emerson (India) Vijay Amritraj	(Mexico) Marcelo Lara (Egypt) Ismail El Shafei (Australia) Barry Phillips-Moore (France) François Jauffret
8 Jul	Carrolls Irish Open; Dublin, Ireland; Group C Hard – 29S/22D	(United States) Sherwood Stewart; 6–3, 9–8	(Rhodesia) Colin Dowdeswell	(South Africa) John Yuill (South Africa) Bob Maud	(Australia) Colin Dibley (United States) Robert Kreiss (United States) Dick Dell (Venezuela) Jorge Andrew
8 Jul	Carrolls Irish Open; Dublin, Ireland; Group C Hard – 29S/22D	(Rhodesia) Colin Dowdeswell (South Africa) John Yuill; 6–3, 6–2	(Argentina) Lito Álvarez (Venezuela) Jorge Andrew	(South Africa) John Yuill (South Africa) Bob Maud	(Australia) Colin Dibley (United States) Robert Kreiss (United States) Dick Dell (Venezuela) Jorge Andrew
15 Jul	Chicago International; Chicago, United States; Group B Carpet – 32S/16D	(United States) Stan Smith; 3–6, 6–1, 6–4	(United States) Marty Riessen	(United States) Eddie Dibbs (United States) Dick Dell	(United States) Brian Gottfried (United States) Fred McNair (United States) Roscoe Tanner (Mexico) Raúl Ramírez
15 Jul	Chicago International; Chicago, United States; Group B Carpet – 32S/16D	(United States) Tom Gorman (United States) Marty Riessen; 4–6, 6–3, 7–5	(United States) Brian Gottfried (Mexico) Raúl Ramírez	(United States) Eddie Dibbs (United States) Dick Dell	(United States) Brian Gottfried (United States) Fred McNair (United States) Roscoe Tanner (Mexico) Raúl Ramírez
15 Jul	Head Cup; Kitzbühel, Austria; Group C Clay – 32S/16D	(Hungary) Balázs Taróczy; 6–1, 6–4, 6–4	(New Zealand) Onny Parun	(Spain) Manuel Orantes (Colombia) Jairo Velasco	(Poland) Tadeusz Nowicki (West Germany) Frank Gebert (Austria) Hans Kary (Czechoslovakia) Milan Holeček
15 Jul	Head Cup; Kitzbühel, Austria; Group C Clay – 32S/16D	(Colombia) Iván Molina (Colombia) Jairo Velasco; 2–6, 7–6, 6–4, 6–4	(Czechoslovakia) František Pála (Hungary) Balázs Taróczy	(Spain) Manuel Orantes (Colombia) Jairo Velasco	(Poland) Tadeusz Nowicki (West Germany) Frank Gebert (Austria) Hans Kary (Czechoslovakia) Milan Holeček
15 Jul	Dutch Open; Hilversum, the Netherlands; Group C Clay – 32S/16D; Singles – Doubles	(Argentina) Guillermo Vilas; 6–4, 6–2, 1–6, 6–3	(Australia) Barry Phillips-Moore	(Mexico) Marcelo Lara (Australia) Paul Kronk	(Argentina) Julián Ganzábal (United Kingdom) John Lloyd (Netherlands) Louk Sanders (Japan) Jun Kamiwazumi
15 Jul	Dutch Open; Hilversum, the Netherlands; Group C Clay – 32S/16D; Singles – Doubles	(Argentina) Tito Vázquez (Argentina) Guillermo Vilas; 6–2, 3–6, 6–1, 6–2	(Argentina) Lito Álvarez (Argentina) Julián Ganzábal	(Mexico) Marcelo Lara (Australia) Paul Kronk	(Argentina) Julián Ganzábal (United Kingdom) John Lloyd (Netherlands) Louk Sanders (Japan) Jun Kamiwazumi
22 Jul	Washington Star International; Washington, United States; Group AA; Clay – $100,000 – 64S/32D	(United States) Harold Solomon; 1–6, 6–3, 6–4	(Argentina) Guillermo Vilas	(United States) Billy Martin (United States) Marty Riessen	(United States) Stan Smith (New Zealand) Onny Parun (Australia) John Alexander (United States) Arthur Ashe
22 Jul	Washington Star International; Washington, United States; Group AA; Clay – $100,000 – 64S/32D	(United States) Tom Gorman (United States) Marty Riessen; 7–5, 6–1	(Chile) Patricio Cornejo (Chile) Jaime Fillol	(United States) Billy Martin (United States) Marty Riessen	(United States) Stan Smith (New Zealand) Onny Parun (Australia) John Alexander (United States) Arthur Ashe
29 Jul	First National Bank Classic; Louisville, United States; Group AA; Clay – $100,000 – 64S/32D	(Argentina) Guillermo Vilas; 6–4, 7–5	(Chile) Jaime Fillol	(United States) Eddie Dibbs (Spain) Manuel Orantes	(United States) Stan Smith (United States) Harold Solomon (Australia) John Alexander (United States) Arthur Ashe
29 Jul	First National Bank Classic; Louisville, United States; Group AA; Clay – $100,000 – 64S/32D	(United States) Charlie Pasarell (United States) Erik van Dillen; 6–2, 6–3	(West Germany) Jürgen Fassbender (West Germany) Hans-Jürgen Pohmann	(United States) Eddie Dibbs (Spain) Manuel Orantes	(United States) Stan Smith (United States) Harold Solomon (Australia) John Alexander (United States) Arthur Ashe
29 Jul	Western Championships; Cincinnati, United States; Group C Carpet (i) – $30,000 – 32S/16D	(United States) Marty Riessen; 7–6, 7–6	(United States) Bob Lutz	(Australia) Colin Dibley (United States) Sherwood Stewart	(United States) Steve Krulevitz (United States) Brian Teacher (Japan) Jun Kamiwazumi (United States) Henry Bunis
29 Jul	Western Championships; Cincinnati, United States; Group C Carpet (i) – $30,000 – 32S/16D	(United States) Dick Dell (United States) Sherwood Stewart; 4–6, 7–6, 6–2	(United States) Jim Delaney (United States) John Whitlinger	(Australia) Colin Dibley (United States) Sherwood Stewart	(United States) Steve Krulevitz (United States) Brian Teacher (Japan) Jun Kamiwazumi (United States) Henry Bunis

=== August ===
Week	Tournament	Champions	Runners-up	Semifinalists	Quarterfinalists
5 Aug	U.S. Clay Court Championships; Indianapolis, United States; Group AA; Clay – $100,000 – 64S/32D; Singles – Doubles	(United States) Jimmy Connors; 5–7, 6–3, 6–4	(Sweden) Björn Borg	(Spain) Manuel Orantes (Mexico) Raúl Ramírez	(New Zealand) Onny Parun (Argentina) Guillermo Vilas (United States) Brian Gottfried (Romania) Ilie Năstase
5 Aug	U.S. Clay Court Championships; Indianapolis, United States; Group AA; Clay – $100,000 – 64S/32D; Singles – Doubles	(United States) Jimmy Connors (Romania) Ilie Năstase; 6–7, 6–3, 6–4	(West Germany) Jürgen Fassbender (West Germany) Hans-Jürgen Pohmann	(Spain) Manuel Orantes (Mexico) Raúl Ramírez	(New Zealand) Onny Parun (Argentina) Guillermo Vilas (United States) Brian Gottfried (Romania) Ilie Năstase
5 Aug	Volvo International; Bretton Woods, United States; Group B Clay – $50,000 – 32S/16D; Singles – Doubles	(Australia) Rod Laver; 6–4, 6–3	(United States) Harold Solomon	(Australia) John Alexander (India) Vijay Amritraj	(India) Anand Amritraj (United States) Eddie Dibbs (United States) Jeff Borowiak (France) François Jauffret
5 Aug	Volvo International; Bretton Woods, United States; Group B Clay – $50,000 – 32S/16D; Singles – Doubles	(United States) Jeff Borowiak (Australia) Rod Laver; 6–3, 6–2	(France) Georges Goven (France) François Jauffret	(Australia) John Alexander (India) Vijay Amritraj	(India) Anand Amritraj (United States) Eddie Dibbs (United States) Jeff Borowiak (France) François Jauffret
12 Aug	Rothmans Canadian Open; Group AA; Toronto, Ontario, Canada; Clay – $100,000 – 64S/32D	(Argentina) Guillermo Vilas; 6–4, 6–2, 6–3	(Spain) Manuel Orantes	(Spain) Juan Gisbert Sr. (Netherlands) Tom Okker	(Mexico) Marcelo Lara (West Germany) Hans-Jürgen Pohmann (Sweden) Björn Borg (United States) Harold Solomon
12 Aug	Rothmans Canadian Open; Group AA; Toronto, Ontario, Canada; Clay – $100,000 – 64S/32D	(Spain) Manuel Orantes (Argentina) Guillermo Vilas; 6–1, 2–6, 6–2	(West Germany) Jürgen Fassbender (West Germany) Hans-Jürgen Pohmann	(Spain) Juan Gisbert Sr. (Netherlands) Tom Okker	(Mexico) Marcelo Lara (West Germany) Hans-Jürgen Pohmann (Sweden) Björn Borg (United States) Harold Solomon
12 Aug	City National Buckeye Championships; Columbus, United States; Group B Hard – $50,000 – 32S/16D	(Mexico) Raúl Ramírez; 3–6, 7–6^{(7–3)}, 6–4	(United States) Roscoe Tanner	(Venezuela) Humphrey Hose (United States) Tom Gorman	(United States) Sherwood Stewart (India) Vijay Amritraj (United States) John Whitlinger (United States) Rick Fisher
12 Aug	City National Buckeye Championships; Columbus, United States; Group B Hard – $50,000 – 32S/16D	(India) Anand Amritraj (India) Vijay Amritraj; Walkover	(United States) Tom Gorman (United States) Bob Lutz	(Venezuela) Humphrey Hose (United States) Tom Gorman	(United States) Sherwood Stewart (India) Vijay Amritraj (United States) John Whitlinger (United States) Rick Fisher
19 Aug	U.S. Professional Tennis Championships; Boston, United States; Group AA; Clay – $100,000 – 64S/32D; Singles – Doubles	(Sweden) Björn Borg; 7–6^{(7–3)}, 6–1, 6–1	(Netherlands) Tom Okker	(Argentina) Guillermo Vilas (Czechoslovakia) Jan Kodeš	(Egypt) Ismail El Shafei (Romania) Ilie Năstase (United States) Marty Riessen (United States) Arthur Ashe
19 Aug	U.S. Professional Tennis Championships; Boston, United States; Group AA; Clay – $100,000 – 64S/32D; Singles – Doubles	(United States) Bob Lutz (United States) Stan Smith; 3–6, 6–4, 6–3	(United States) Marty Riessen (West Germany) Hans-Jürgen Pohmann	(Argentina) Guillermo Vilas (Czechoslovakia) Jan Kodeš	(Egypt) Ismail El Shafei (Romania) Ilie Năstase (United States) Marty Riessen (United States) Arthur Ashe
19 Aug	Medi-Quik Open; South Orange, United States; Group B Grass – $50,000 – 32S/16D	(Soviet Union) Alex Metreveli; Walkover	(United States) Jimmy Connors	(Australia) Kim Warwick (India) Anand Amritraj	(United States) Billy Martin (United States) Sherwood Stewart (United States) Brian Gottfried (India) Vijay Amritraj
19 Aug	Medi-Quik Open; South Orange, United States; Group B Grass – $50,000 – 32S/16D	(United States) Brian Gottfried (Mexico) Raúl Ramírez; 7–6, 6–7, 7–6	(India) Anand Amritraj (India) Vijay Amritraj	(Australia) Kim Warwick (India) Anand Amritraj	(United States) Billy Martin (United States) Sherwood Stewart (United States) Brian Gottfried (India) Vijay Amritraj
19 Aug	Pennsylvanian Championships; Merion, United States; Group C Grass – 64S/30D	(United Kingdom) John Lloyd; 6–0, 4–6, 6–3, 7–5	(United States) John Whitlinger	(Australia) Ray Keldie (United States) Ferdi Taygan	(United States) Mike Estep (United States) Fred McNair (United States) Jim Delaney (United States) Brian Teacher
19 Aug	Pennsylvanian Championships; Merion, United States; Group C Grass – 64S/30D	(United States) Roy Barth (Venezuela) Humphrey Hose; 7–6, 6–2	(United States) Mike Machette (United States) Fred McNair	(Australia) Ray Keldie (United States) Ferdi Taygan	(United States) Mike Estep (United States) Fred McNair (United States) Jim Delaney (United States) Brian Teacher
26 Aug; 2 Sep	US Open; New York City, United States; Grand Slam; Triple Crown; Grass – $150,000 – 128S/51D/32XD; Singles – Doubles – Mixed doubles	(United States) Jimmy Connors; 6–1, 6–0, 6–1	(Australia) Ken Rosewall	(United States) Roscoe Tanner (Australia) John Newcombe	(Soviet Union) Alex Metreveli (United States) Stan Smith (India) Vijay Amritraj (United States) Arthur Ashe
26 Aug; 2 Sep	US Open; New York City, United States; Grand Slam; Triple Crown; Grass – $150,000 – 128S/51D/32XD; Singles – Doubles – Mixed doubles	(United States) Bob Lutz (United States) Stan Smith; 6–3, 6–3	(Chile) Patricio Cornejo (Chile) Jaime Fillol	(United States) Roscoe Tanner (Australia) John Newcombe	(Soviet Union) Alex Metreveli (United States) Stan Smith (India) Vijay Amritraj (United States) Arthur Ashe
26 Aug; 2 Sep	US Open; New York City, United States; Grand Slam; Triple Crown; Grass – $150,000 – 128S/51D/32XD; Singles – Doubles – Mixed doubles	(United States) Pam Teeguarden (Australia) Geoff Masters; 6–1, 7–6	(United States) Chris Evert (United States) Jimmy Connors	(United States) Roscoe Tanner (Australia) John Newcombe	(Soviet Union) Alex Metreveli (United States) Stan Smith (India) Vijay Amritraj (United States) Arthur Ashe

=== September ===
Week	Tournament	Champions	Runners-up	Semifinalists	Quarterfinalists
9 Sep	Perspectus Tennis Classic; Cedar Grove, United States; Group B Clay – $50,000 - 32S/16D	(Romania) Ilie Năstase; 6–4, 7–6	(Spain) Juan Gisbert Sr.	(Brazil) Thomaz Koch (United States) Charles Owens	(Australia) Ray Ruffels (West Germany) Jürgen Fassbender (Australia) Barry Phillips-Moore (United Kingdom) Roger Taylor
9 Sep	Perspectus Tennis Classic; Cedar Grove, United States; Group B Clay – $50,000 - 32S/16D	(United States) Steve Siegel (Australia) Kim Warwick; 4–6, 6–2, 6–1	(Australia) Dick Crealy (United States) Bob Tanis	(Brazil) Thomaz Koch (United States) Charles Owens	(Australia) Ray Ruffels (West Germany) Jürgen Fassbender (Australia) Barry Phillips-Moore (United Kingdom) Roger Taylor
16 Sep	Pacific Southwest Open; Los Angeles, United States; Group AA; Hard – $175,000 – 64S/32D; Singles – Doubles	(United States) Jimmy Connors; 6–3, 6–1	(United States) Harold Solomon	(Rhodesia) Andrew Pattison (United States) Tom Gorman	(United States) Jeff Borowiak (United States) Roscoe Tanner (United States) Arthur Ashe (Mexico) Raúl Ramírez
16 Sep	Pacific Southwest Open; Los Angeles, United States; Group AA; Hard – $175,000 – 64S/32D; Singles – Doubles	(Australia) Ross Case (Australia) Geoff Masters; 6–3, 6–2	(United States) Brian Gottfried (Mexico) Raúl Ramírez	(Rhodesia) Andrew Pattison (United States) Tom Gorman	(United States) Jeff Borowiak (United States) Roscoe Tanner (United States) Arthur Ashe (Mexico) Raúl Ramírez
23 Sep	Fireman's Fund International; San Francisco, United States; Group AA; Carpet (i) – $175,000 – 64S/32D	(Australia) Ross Case; 6–3, 5–7, 6–4	(United States) Arthur Ashe	(New Zealand) Onny Parun (United States) Charlie Pasarell	(United States) Jimmy Connors (United States) Vitas Gerulaitis (United States) Dick Stockton (United States) Sandy Mayer
23 Sep	Fireman's Fund International; San Francisco, United States; Group AA; Carpet (i) – $175,000 – 64S/32D	(United States) Bob Lutz (United States) Stan Smith; 6–4, 7–6^{(8–6)}	(Australia) John Alexander (Australia) Syd Ball	(New Zealand) Onny Parun (United States) Charlie Pasarell	(United States) Jimmy Connors (United States) Vitas Gerulaitis (United States) Dick Stockton (United States) Sandy Mayer
30 Sep	Hawaii Open; Maui, United States; Group B 50,000 – hard – 32S/16D	(Australia) John Newcombe; 7–6, 7–6	(United States) Roscoe Tanner	(United States) Dick Stockton (United States) Sherwood Stewart	(Australia) Colin Dibley (Australia) Ray Ruffels (United States) Tom Gorman (New Zealand) Onny Parun
30 Sep	Hawaii Open; Maui, United States; Group B 50,000 – hard – 32S/16D	(United States) Dick Stockton (United States) Roscoe Tanner; 6–3, 7–6	(Australia) Owen Davidson (Australia) John Newcombe	(United States) Dick Stockton (United States) Sherwood Stewart	(Australia) Colin Dibley (Australia) Ray Ruffels (United States) Tom Gorman (New Zealand) Onny Parun

=== October ===
Week	Tournament	Champions	Runners-up	Semifinalists	Quarterfinalists
7 Oct	Melia Trophy; Madrid, Spain; Group A Clay – 64S/32D	(Romania) Ilie Năstase; 6–4, 5–7, 6–2, 4–6, 6–4	(Sweden) Björn Borg	(Argentina) Guillermo Vilas (Spain) Manuel Orantes	(Czechoslovakia) Jan Kodeš (United States) Harold Solomon (Mexico) Raúl Ramírez (Netherlands) Tom Okker
7 Oct	Melia Trophy; Madrid, Spain; Group A Clay – 64S/32D	(France) Patrice Dominguez (Spain) Antonio Muñoz; 6–1, 6–3	(United States) Brian Gottfried (Mexico) Raúl Ramírez	(Argentina) Guillermo Vilas (Spain) Manuel Orantes	(Czechoslovakia) Jan Kodeš (United States) Harold Solomon (Mexico) Raúl Ramírez (Netherlands) Tom Okker
7 Oct	Japan Open Tennis Championships; Tokyo, Japan; Group A Clay – 48S/24D	(Australia) John Newcombe; 3–6, 6–2, 6–3	(Australia) Ken Rosewall	(Australia) Kim Warwick (United States) Dick Stockton	(New Zealand) Onny Parun (United States) Roscoe Tanner (United States) Cliff Richey (Australia) Ross Case
7 Oct	Japan Open Tennis Championships; Tokyo, Japan; Group A Clay – 48S/24D	Not completed. (4 pairs remaining)		(Australia) Kim Warwick (United States) Dick Stockton	(New Zealand) Onny Parun (United States) Roscoe Tanner (United States) Cliff Richey (Australia) Ross Case
14 Oct	Trofeo Conde de Godó; Barcelona, Spain; Group A Clay – $75,000 – 64S/32D; Singles – Doubles	(Romania) Ilie Năstase; 8–6, 9–7, 6–3	(Spain) Manuel Orantes	(France) François Jauffret (Sweden) Björn Borg	(Poland) Wojciech Fibak (United States) Harold Solomon (Chile) Jaime Fillol (Czechoslovakia) Jan Kodeš
14 Oct	Trofeo Conde de Godó; Barcelona, Spain; Group A Clay – $75,000 – 64S/32D; Singles – Doubles	(Spain) Juan Gisbert Sr. (Romania) Ilie Năstase; 3–6, 6–0, 6–2	(Spain) Manuel Orantes (Argentina) Guillermo Vilas	(France) François Jauffret (Sweden) Björn Borg	(Poland) Wojciech Fibak (United States) Harold Solomon (Chile) Jaime Fillol (Czechoslovakia) Jan Kodeš
14 Oct	Australian Indoor Championships; Sydney, Australia; Group A Hard (i) – $75,000 – 32S/16D; Singles – Doubles	(Australia) John Newcombe; 6–4, 6–3, 6–4	(United States) Cliff Richey	(Australia) Tony Roche (Australia) Ken Rosewall	(New Zealand) Onny Parun (Australia) Allan Stone (Australia) Phil Dent (United States) Roscoe Tanner
14 Oct	Australian Indoor Championships; Sydney, Australia; Group A Hard (i) – $75,000 – 32S/16D; Singles – Doubles	(Australia) Ross Case (Australia) Geoff Masters; 6–4, 6–4	(Australia) John Newcombe (Australia) Tony Roche	(Australia) Tony Roche (Australia) Ken Rosewall	(New Zealand) Onny Parun (Australia) Allan Stone (Australia) Phil Dent (United States) Roscoe Tanner
21 Oct	Aryamehr Cup; Tehran, Iran; Group AA; Clay – $100,000 – 48S/21D	(Argentina) Guillermo Vilas; 6–0, 6–3, 6–1	(Mexico) Raúl Ramírez	(Brazil) Thomaz Koch (Sweden) Björn Borg	(United States) Brian Gottfried (Netherlands) Tom Okker (United Kingdom) Roger Taylor (United States) Eddie Dibbs
21 Oct	Aryamehr Cup; Tehran, Iran; Group AA; Clay – $100,000 – 48S/21D	(Spain) Manuel Orantes (Argentina) Guillermo Vilas; 7–6, 2–6, 6–2	(United States) Brian Gottfried (Mexico) Raúl Ramírez	(Brazil) Thomaz Koch (Sweden) Björn Borg	(United States) Brian Gottfried (Netherlands) Tom Okker (United Kingdom) Roger Taylor (United States) Eddie Dibbs
21 Oct	Benson & Hedges Classic; Christchurch, New Zealand; Group C Hard (i) – 32S/15D	(United States) Roscoe Tanner; 6–4, 6–2	(Australia) Ray Ruffels	(United States) Sandy Mayer (New Zealand) Onny Parun	(Australia) Fred Stolle (West Germany) Jürgen Fassbender (Australia) Dick Crealy (United States) Cliff Richey
21 Oct	Benson & Hedges Classic; Christchurch, New Zealand; Group C Hard (i) – 32S/15D	(Egypt) Ismail El Shafei (United States) Roscoe Tanner; Walkover	(Australia) Syd Ball (Australia) Ray Ruffels	(United States) Sandy Mayer (New Zealand) Onny Parun	(Australia) Fred Stolle (West Germany) Jürgen Fassbender (Australia) Dick Crealy (United States) Cliff Richey
21 Oct	South Pacific Championships; Melbourne, Australia; Group C Clay – 32S/16D; Singles – Doubles	(United States) Dick Stockton; 6–2, 6–3, 6–2	(Australia) Geoff Masters	(Australia) John Newcombe (United States) Sherwood Stewart	(Australia) Cliff Letcher (Australia) Allan Stone (Australia) Paul Kronk (Australia) Ernie Ewert
21 Oct	South Pacific Championships; Melbourne, Australia; Group C Clay – 32S/16D; Singles – Doubles	(United States) Raz Reid (Australia) Allan Stone; 7–6, 6–4	(United States) Mike Estep (Australia) Paul Kronk	(Australia) John Newcombe (United States) Sherwood Stewart	(Australia) Cliff Letcher (Australia) Allan Stone (Australia) Paul Kronk (Australia) Ernie Ewert
28 Oct	Jean Becker Open; Paris, France; Group B Hard (i) – $50,000 – 32S/16D; Singles – Doubles	(United States) Brian Gottfried; 6–3, 5–7, 8–6, 6–0	(United States) Eddie Dibbs	(Chile) Jaime Fillol (United States) Arthur Ashe	(Argentina) Guillermo Vilas (United States) Charlie Pasarell (United States) Harold Solomon (Brazil) Thomaz Koch
28 Oct	Jean Becker Open; Paris, France; Group B Hard (i) – $50,000 – 32S/16D; Singles – Doubles	(France) Patrice Dominguez (France) François Jauffret; 7–5, 6–4	(United States) Brian Gottfried (Mexico) Raúl Ramírez	(Chile) Jaime Fillol (United States) Arthur Ashe	(Argentina) Guillermo Vilas (United States) Charlie Pasarell (United States) Harold Solomon (Brazil) Thomaz Koch
28 Oct	Indonesia Open; Jakarta, Indonesia; Group B Hard – 32S/16D	(New Zealand) Onny Parun; 6–3, 6–3, 6–4	(Australia) Kim Warwick	(West Germany) Jürgen Fassbender (Australia) Dick Crealy	(United States) Roscoe Tanner (Australia) Ross Case (United States) Sherwood Stewart (Japan) Jun Kuki
28 Oct	Indonesia Open; Jakarta, Indonesia; Group B Hard – 32S/16D	(Egypt) Ismail El Shafei (United States) Roscoe Tanner; 7–5, 6–3	(West Germany) Jürgen Fassbender (West Germany) Hans-Jürgen Pohmann	(West Germany) Jürgen Fassbender (Australia) Dick Crealy	(United States) Roscoe Tanner (Australia) Ross Case (United States) Sherwood Stewart (Japan) Jun Kuki
28 Oct	Stadthalle Open; Group C Vienna, Austria; Hard (i) – 32S/16D	(United States) Vitas Gerulaitis; 6–4, 3–6, 6–3, 6–2	(Rhodesia) Andrew Pattison	(United States) Tom Gorman (Hungary) Balázs Taróczy	(West Germany) Karl Meiler (South Africa) Raymond Moore (Austria) Hans Kary (Austria) Ingo Wimmer
28 Oct	Stadthalle Open; Group C Vienna, Austria; Hard (i) – 32S/16D	(South Africa) Raymond Moore (Rhodesia) Andrew Pattison; 6–4, 5–7, 6–4	(South Africa) Bob Hewitt (South Africa) Frew McMillan	(United States) Tom Gorman (Hungary) Balázs Taróczy	(West Germany) Karl Meiler (South Africa) Raymond Moore (Austria) Hans Kary (Austria) Ingo Wimmer

=== November ===
Week	Tournament	Champions	Runners-up	Semifinalists	Quarterfinalists
4 Nov	Stockholm Open; Stockholm, Sweden; Group AA; Hard (i) – $100,000 – 64S/32D; Singles – Doubles	(United States) Arthur Ashe; 6–2, 6–2	(Netherlands) Tom Okker	(Sweden) Björn Borg (Argentina) Guillermo Vilas	(Spain) Manuel Orantes (United States) Marty Riessen (Spain) Juan Gisbert Sr. (Mexico) Raúl Ramírez
4 Nov	Stockholm Open; Stockholm, Sweden; Group AA; Hard (i) – $100,000 – 64S/32D; Singles – Doubles	(Netherlands) Tom Okker (United States) Marty Riessen; 2–6, 6–3, 6–4	(South Africa) Bob Hewitt (South Africa) Frew McMillan	(Sweden) Björn Borg (Argentina) Guillermo Vilas	(Spain) Manuel Orantes (United States) Marty Riessen (Spain) Juan Gisbert Sr. (Mexico) Raúl Ramírez
4 Nov	Viceroy Classic; Hong Kong, Hong Kong; Group B Hard – $50,000 – 32S/16D	No final due to rain.		(Australia) J. Newcombe vs. (New Zealand) O. Parun (United States) R. Tanner vs. (Australia) K. Rosewall	(United Kingdom) Roger Taylor (Australia) Phil Dent (Australia) Ross Case (Australia) Bob Carmichael
4 Nov	Viceroy Classic; Hong Kong, Hong Kong; Group B Hard – $50,000 – 32S/16D	Not completed. (4 pairs remaining) |		(Australia) J. Newcombe vs. (New Zealand) O. Parun (United States) R. Tanner vs. (Australia) K. Rosewall	(United Kingdom) Roger Taylor (Australia) Phil Dent (Australia) Ross Case (Australia) Bob Carmichael
11 Nov	Dewar Cup; London, Great Britain; Group A Carpet (i) – 32S/16D	(United States) Jimmy Connors; 6–2, 7–6	(United States) Brian Gottfried	(Netherlands) Tom Okker (Argentina) Guillermo Vilas	(United States) Harold Solomon (United States) Arthur Ashe (Spain) Manuel Orantes (Mexico) Raúl Ramírez
11 Nov	Dewar Cup; London, Great Britain; Group A Carpet (i) – 32S/16D	(United States) Jimmy Connors (Romania) Ilie Năstase; 3–6, 7–6, 6–3	(United States) Brian Gottfried (Mexico) Raúl Ramírez	(Netherlands) Tom Okker (Argentina) Guillermo Vilas	(United States) Harold Solomon (United States) Arthur Ashe (Spain) Manuel Orantes (Mexico) Raúl Ramírez
11 Nov	Indian Open; Bombay, India; Group B Clay – $50,000 – 32S/16D	(New Zealand) Onny Parun; 6–3, 6–3, 7–6	(Australia) Tony Roche	(United States) John Andrews (Australia) Dick Crealy	(India) Anand Amritraj (Spain) Manuel Santana (India) Vijay Amritraj (United States) Dick Dell
11 Nov	Indian Open; Bombay, India; Group B Clay – $50,000 – 32S/16D	(India) Anand Amritraj (India) Vijay Amritraj; 6–4, 7–6	(Australia) Dick Crealy (New Zealand) Onny Parun	(United States) John Andrews (Australia) Dick Crealy	(India) Anand Amritraj (Spain) Manuel Santana (India) Vijay Amritraj (United States) Dick Dell
11 Nov	Philippine Open; Manila, the Philippines; Group B Clay (i) – 32S/14D	(Egypt) Ismail El Shafei; 7–6, 6–1	(West Germany) Hans-Jürgen Pohmann	(Australia) John Newcombe (Japan) Jun Kuki	(United Kingdom) Roger Taylor (United States) John Austin (United States) Fred McNair (West Germany) Jürgen Fassbender
11 Nov	Philippine Open; Manila, the Philippines; Group B Clay (i) – 32S/14D	(Australia) Syd Ball (Australia) Ross Case; 6–3, 6–7, 9–7	(United States) Mike Estep (Mexico) Marcelo Lara	(Australia) John Newcombe (Japan) Jun Kuki	(United Kingdom) Roger Taylor (United States) John Austin (United States) Fred McNair (West Germany) Jürgen Fassbender
11 Nov	Oslo Open; Oslo, Norway; Group C Hard (i) – $25,000 – 32S/16D	(United States) Jeff Borowiak; 6–3, 6–2	(West Germany) Karl Meiler	(South Africa) Bob Hewitt (Sweden) Jan-Erik Lundqvist	(Austria) Hans Kary (United States) Vitas Gerulaitis (United States) Paul Gerken (Pakistan) Haroon Rahim
11 Nov	Oslo Open; Oslo, Norway; Group C Hard (i) – $25,000 – 32S/16D	(West Germany) Karl Meiler (Pakistan) Haroon Rahim; 6–3, 6–2	(United States) Jeff Borowiak (United States) Vitas Gerulaitis	(South Africa) Bob Hewitt (Sweden) Jan-Erik Lundqvist	(Austria) Hans Kary (United States) Vitas Gerulaitis (United States) Paul Gerken (Pakistan) Haroon Rahim
18 Nov	South African Breweries Open; Johannesburg, South Africa; Group AA; Hard – 32S/32D/16XD	(United States) Jimmy Connors; 7–6, 6–3, 6–1	(United States) Arthur Ashe	(United States) Harold Solomon (Mexico) Raúl Ramírez	(Rhodesia) Andrew Pattison (Netherlands) Tom Okker (United States) Marty Riessen (Australia) Ken Rosewall
18 Nov	South African Breweries Open; Johannesburg, South Africa; Group AA; Hard – 32S/32D/16XD	(South Africa) Bob Hewitt (South Africa) Frew McMillan; 7–6, 6–4, 6–3	(Netherlands) Tom Okker (United States) Marty Riessen	(United States) Harold Solomon (Mexico) Raúl Ramírez	(Rhodesia) Andrew Pattison (Netherlands) Tom Okker (United States) Marty Riessen (Australia) Ken Rosewall
18 Nov	South African Breweries Open; Johannesburg, South Africa; Group AA; Hard – 32S/32D/16XD	(Australia) Margaret Court (United States) Marty Riessen; 6–0, 6–2	(South Africa) Ilana Kloss (West Germany) Jürgen Fassbender	(United States) Harold Solomon (Mexico) Raúl Ramírez	(Rhodesia) Andrew Pattison (Netherlands) Tom Okker (United States) Marty Riessen (Australia) Ken Rosewall
18 Nov	South American Championships; Buenos Aires, Argentina; Group A Clay – $50,000 – 32S/23D; Singles	(Argentina) Guillermo Vilas; 6–3, 0–6, 7–5, 6–2	(Spain) Manuel Orantes	(Brazil) José Edison Mandarino (Colombia) Iván Molina	(Bolivia) Ramiro Benavides (Socialist Federal Republic of Yugoslavia) Željko Franulović (Argentina) Ricardo Cano (Paraguay) Víctor Pecci
18 Nov	South American Championships; Buenos Aires, Argentina; Group A Clay – $50,000 – 32S/23D; Singles	(Spain) Manuel Orantes (Argentina) Guillermo Vilas; 6–4, 6–3	(Chile) Patricio Cornejo (Chile) Jaime Fillol	(Brazil) José Edison Mandarino (Colombia) Iván Molina	(Bolivia) Ramiro Benavides (Socialist Federal Republic of Yugoslavia) Željko Franulović (Argentina) Ricardo Cano (Paraguay) Víctor Pecci
25 Nov	Davis Cup Final	South Africa; Walkover (Note: South Africa won by default after the Indian Government refused to let their Davis Cup team play; this was in protest against the racial policies of the South African Government.)	India	Soviet Union; Italy	

=== December ===
Week	Tournament	Champions	Runners-up	Semifinalists	Quarterfinalists
10 Dec	Commercial Union Assurance Masters; Melbourne, Australia; Masters Grand Prix; Grass – $100,000 – 8S; Singles	(Argentina) Guillermo Vilas; 7–6, 6–2, 3–6, 3–6, 6–4	(Romania) Ilie Năstase	(Mexico) Raúl Ramírez (Australia) John Newcombe	Round robin (Sweden) Björn Borg (New Zealand) Onny Parun (Spain) Manuel Orantes (United States) Harold Solomon

== Points system ==
The tournaments of the Grand Prix circuit were divided into five groups. Group TC consisted of the Triple Crown events—the French Open, the Wimbledon Championships, and the US Open—while the other tournaments were divided into four other groups—AA, A, B, and C—by prize money and draw size. Group AA tournaments had a minimum prize money of $100,000 while the minimum for Group A, B and C tournaments was $75,000, $50,000 and $25,000 respectively. Points were allocated based on these groups and the finishing position of a player in a tournament. No points were awarded to first-round losers, and ties were settled by the number of tournaments played. Grand Prix points were also allocated to doubles results for the first time this year and are listed in brackets in the points allocation below:

Group TC
- Champion: 120 (24)
- Runner-up: 90 (18)
- Semifinalist: 60 (12)
- Quarterfinalist: 30 (6)
- Fourth Round: 15 (3)
- Third Round: 7 (1)
- Second Round: 3

Group AA
- Champion: 80 (16)
- Runner-up: 60 (12)
- Semifinalist: 40 (8)
- Quarterfinalist: 20 (4)
- 9th – 16th: 10 (2)
- 17th – 32nd: 5

Group A
- Champion: 60 (12)
- Runner-up: 45 (9)
- Semifinalist: 30 (6)
- Quarterfinalist: 15 (3)
- 9th – 16th: 7 (1)
- 17th – 32nd: 3

Group B
- Champion: 40 (8)
- Runner-up: 30 (6)
- Semifinalist: 20 (4)
- 5th – 8th: 10 (2)
- 9th – 16th: 5

Group C
- Champion: 20 (4)
- Runner-up: 15 (3)
- Semifinalist: 10 (2)
- 5th – 8th: 5 (1)
- 9th – 16th: 3

In addition a player could earn ranking points for participating in the Davis Cup team competition if the matches coincided with a Grand Prix tournament.

== Standings ==
Rk	Name	TC		AA		A		B		C		Played	Titles	Prize money	Bonus Pool	Points
Rk	Name	Played	Titles	Played	Titles	Played	Titles	Played	Titles	Played	Titles	Played	Titles	Prize money	Bonus Pool	Points
1	(Argentina) Guillermo Vilas	3	0	9	3	4	1	3	1	1	1	20	6	$119,844	$100,000	797
2	(United States) Jimmy Connors	2	2	6	3	1	1	2	1	0	0	11	7	$130,760	$55,000	714
3	(Spain) Manuel Orantes	3	0	9	0	4	0	3	0	1	0	20	0	$86,872	$37,500	622
4	(Sweden) Björn Borg	3	1	7	2	2	0	2	1	0	0	14	4	$97,616	$27,500	607
5	(Mexico) Raúl Ramírez	3	0	10	0	3	0	5	1	0	0	21	1	$60,775	$22,500	488
6	(Romania) Ilie Năstase	3	0	5	0	3	2	2	2	1	0	14	4	$73,198	$19,750	482
7	(New Zealand) Onny Parun	3	0	9	0	2	0	9	2	2	0	25	2	$61,552	$17,750	452.5
8	(United States) Harold Solomon	2	0	11	1	3	0	5	0	0	0	21	1	$58,705	$16,000	429
9	(United States) Arthur Ashe	3	0	9	1	2	0	2	0	0	0	16	1	$53,119	$15,000	422
10	(United States) Stan Smith	3	0	7	1	0	0	1	1	0	0	11	2	$56,700	$14,000	416
11	(United States) Roscoe Tanner	3	0	7	0	2	0	6	0	1	1	19	1	$51,077	$13,000	397.5
12	(Australia) John Newcombe	2	0	1	0	2	2	4	1	1	0	10	3	$62,475	–	397.25
13	(United States) Brian Gottfried	3	0	6	0	0	0	3	0	1	0	20	0	$50,915	$12,000	370
14	(Netherlands) Tom Okker	2	0	5	0	3	0	0	0	0	0	10	0	$42,539	$11,500	333
15	(United States) Marty Riessen	3	0	7	0	1	0	1	0	1	1	13	1	$42,316	$11,000	331

== ATP rankings ==
These are the ATP rankings of the top twenty singles players at the end of the 1973 season and at the end of the 1974 season, with numbers of ranking points, points averages, numbers of tournaments played, year-end rankings in 1974, highest and lowest positions during the season and number of spots gained or lost from the first rankings to the year-end rankings.

As of 14 December 1973
Rk	Name
1	Ilie Năstase (ROM)
2	John Newcombe (AUS)
3	Jimmy Connors (USA)
4	Tom Okker (NED)
5	Stan Smith (USA)
6	Ken Rosewall (AUS)
7	Manuel Orantes (ESP)
8	Rod Laver (AUS)
9	Jan Kodeš (TCH)
10	Arthur Ashe (USA)
11	Tom Gorman (USA)
12	Roy Emerson (AUS)
13	Marty Riessen (USA)
14	Adriano Panatta (ITA)
15	Nikola Pilić (YUG)
16	Roger Taylor (GBR)
17	Jaime Fillol (CHI)
18	Björn Borg (SWE)
19	Cliff Richey (USA)
20	Paolo Bertolucci (ITA)

Year-end rankings 1974 (17 January 1975)
Rk	Name	Points	Average	High	Low	Change
1	Jimmy Connors (USA)	768	59.08			▲ +2
2	John Newcombe (AUS)	753	37.65			=
3	Björn Borg (SWE)	813	35.358			▲ +15
4	Rod Laver (AUS)	447	34.38			▲ +4
5	Guillermo Vilas (ARG)	786	29.11			▲ +26
6	Tom Okker (NED)	595	28.33			▼ −2
7	Arthur Ashe (USA)	778	27.79			▲ +3
8	Ken Rosewall (AUS)	324	27.00			▼ −2
9	Stan Smith (USA)	593	25.78			▼ −4
10	Ilie Năstase (ROM)	615	25.63			▼ −9
11	Manuel Orantes (ESP)	560	20.74			▼ −4
12	Marty Riessen (USA)	452	18.08			▲ +1
13	Alex Metreveli (URS)	281	17.56			▲ +21
14	Roscoe Tanner (USA)	513	16.55			▲ +10
15	Harold Solomon (USA)	521	15.32			▲ +43
16	Dick Stockton (USA)	322	14.64			▲ +12
17	Jan Kodeš (TCH)	305	14.52			▼ −8
18	Raúl Ramírez (MEX)	498	14.23			▲ +7
19	Cliff Drysdale (RSA)	196	14.00			▲ +5
20	Eddie Dibbs (USA)	389	13.41			▲ +25

*The official ATP year-end rankings were listed from January 17th, 1975.

== List of tournament winners ==
The list of winners and number of Grand Prix singles titles won, sorted by number of titles (Grand Slam titles in bold):

- (United States) Jimmy Connors (7) **Melbourne**, **Wimbledon**, Indianapolis, **US Open**, Los Angeles, London, Johannesburg
- (Argentina) Guillermo Vilas (7) Gstaad, Hilversum, Louisville, Toronto, Tehran, Buenos Aires, Masters
- (Sweden) Björn Borg (4) Rome, **French Open**, Båstad, Boston
- (Romania) Ilie Năstase (4) Bournemouth, Cedar Grove, Madrid, Barcelona
- (Australia) John Newcombe (3) Maui, Tokyo, Sydney Indoor
- (United States) Jeff Borowiak (2) Charlotte, Oslo
- (New Zealand) Onny Parun (2) Jakarta, Bombay
- (United States) Stan Smith (2) Nottingham, Chicago
- (United States) Arthur Ashe (1) Stockholm
- (Australia) Ross Case (1) San Francisco
- (United States) Eddie Dibbs (1) Hamburg
- (West Germany) Jürgen Fassbender (1) Munich
- (United States) Vitas Gerulaitis (1) Vienna
- (United States) Brian Gottfried (1) Paris Bercy
- (Australia) Rod Laver (1) Bretton Woods
- (United Kingdom) John Lloyd (1) Merion
- (Soviet Union) Alex Metreveli (1) South Orange
- (Italy) Adriano Panatta (1) Florence
- (Mexico) Raúl Ramírez (1) Columbus
- (United States) Marty Riessen (1) Cincinnati
- (Egypt) Ismail El Shafei (1) Manila
- (United States) Harold Solomon (1) Washington, D.C.
- (United States) Sherwood Stewart (1) Dublin
- (United States) Roscoe Tanner (1) Christchurch
- (Hungary) Balázs Taróczy (1) Kitzbühel

The following players won their first Grand Prix title in 1974:

- (Sweden) Björn Borg Auckland
- (United States) Jeff Borowiak Charlotte
- (West Germany) Jürgen Fassbender Munich
- (United States) Vitas Gerulaitis Vienna
- (United Kingdom) John Lloyd Merion
- (New Zealand) Onny Parun Jakarta
- (Egypt) Ismail El Shafei Manila
- (United States) Harold Solomon Washington, D.C.
- (United States) Sherwood Stewart Dublin
- (Hungary) Balázs Taróczy Kitzbühel

== See also ==
- 1974 World Championship Tennis circuit
- 1974 USLTA Indoor Circuit
- 1974 WTA Tour
