= 1974 Japan Open Tennis Championships =

- Date: 7–13 October
- Edition: 2nd
- Category: Grand Prix (A)
- Draw: 64S / 32D
- Prize money: $100,000
- Surface: Hard / outdoor
- Location: Tokyo, Japan

Champions

Men's singles
- (Australia) John Newcombe

Women's singles
- (Brazil) Maria Bueno

Men's doubles
- final not played

Women's doubles
- (Australia) Ann Kiyomura / (Japan) Kazuko Sawamatsu
- Japan Open

The 1974 Japan Open Tennis Championships was a combined men's and women's tennis tournament played on hard courts and took place in Tokyo, Japan. The men's events were part of the 1974 Commercial Union Assurance Grand Prix while the women's tournament was a non-tour event. The tournament was held from 7 October through 13 October 1974. First-seeded John Newcombe won the men's singles title and the accompanying $15,000 first prize money and Maria Bueno won the women's singles event.

== Finals ==
=== Men's singles ===
(Australia) John Newcombe defeated (Australia) Ken Rosewall 3–6, 6–2, 6–3

=== Women's singles ===
(Brazil) Maria Bueno defeated (West Germany) Katja Ebbinghaus 3–6, 6–4, 6–3

=== Doubles ===
Not completed due to rain.
