= 1974 World Championship Tennis Finals =

- Date: May 8–12
- Edition: 4th
- Category: World Championship Tennis
- Draw: 8S
- Prize money: $100,000
- Surface: Carpet / Indoor
- Location: Dallas, Texas, US
- Venue: Moody Coliseum

Champions

Singles
- (Australia) John Newcombe
← 1973 ·	WCT Finals	· 1975 →

The 1974 World Championship Tennis Finals was a men's tennis tournament played on indoor carpet courts. It was the 4th edition of the WCT Finals and was part of the 1974 World Championship Tennis circuit. The tournament was played at the Moody Coliseum in Dallas, Texas in the United States and was held from May 8 through May 12, 1974. Fourth-seeded John Newcombe won the singles title.

== Finals ==
=== Singles ===
(Australia) John Newcombe defeated (Sweden) Björn Borg 4–6, 6–3, 6–3, 6–2

- It was Newcombe's 8th title of the year and the 56th of his career.

== See also ==
- 1974 Commercial Union Assurance Masters
- 1974 WCT World Doubles
