= 1974 Australian Indoor Championships =

- Date: 13–20 October
- Edition: 2nd
- Category: Grand Prix (Group A)
- Draw: 32S / 16D
- Prize money: $70,000
- Location: Sydney, Australia
- Venue: Hordern Pavilion

Champions

Singles
- (Australia) John Newcombe

Doubles
- (Australia) Ross Case / (Australia) Geoff Masters
- Australian Indoor Championships

The 1974 Australian Indoor Championships was a men's professional tennis tournament played on indoor hard courts at the Hordern Pavilion in Sydney, Australia. It was part of the 1974 Commercial Union Assurance Grand Prix circuit as a Group A category event. It was the second edition of the tournament and was held from 13 October through 20 October 1974. First-seeded John Newcombe won the singles title.

== Finals ==
=== Singles ===
(Australia) John Newcombe defeated (United States) Cliff Richey 6–4, 6–3, 6–4

- It was Newcombe's 12th title of the year and the 60th of his career.

=== Doubles ===
(Australia) Ross Case / (Australia) Geoff Masters defeated (Australia) John Newcombe / (Australia) Tony Roche 6–4, 6–4

- It was Case's 5th title of the year and the 8th of his career. It was Masters' 3rd title of the year and the 5th of his career.
