= 1974 Pacific Southwest Open =

- Date: September 16–22
- Edition: 48th
- Category: Grand Prix (AA)
- Draw: 64S / 32D
- Prize money: $175,000
- Surface: Hard / outdoor
- Location: Los Angeles, California, U.S.
- Venue: Los Angeles Tennis Club

Champions

Singles
- (United States) Jimmy Connors

Doubles
- (Australia) Ross Case / (Australia) Geoff Masters
- Pacific Southwest Open

The 1974 Pacific Southwest Open was a men's tennis tournament played on outdoor hard courts at the Los Angeles Tennis Club in Los Angeles, California in the United States. The event was categorized as an AA Group tournament and was part of the 1974 Grand Prix tennis circuit. It was the 48th edition of the tournament and ran from September 16 through September 22, 1974. First-seeded and defending champion Jimmy Connors won the singles title after having survived two matchpoints in his first round match against Mal Anderson. With his victory Connors earned $16,000 first prize money as well as 80 Grand Prix ranking points.

== Finals ==
=== Singles ===
(United States) Jimmy Connors defeated (United States) Harold Solomon 6–3, 6–1

- It was Connors' 13th singles title of the year and the 30th of his career.

=== Doubles ===
(Australia) Ross Case / (Australia) Geoff Masters defeated (United States) Brian Gottfried / (Mexico) Raúl Ramírez 6–3, 6–2
