= 1974 City National Buckeye Championships =

- Date: August 13–19
- Edition: 5th
- Category: Grand Prix (Group B)
- Draw: 32S / 16D
- Prize money: $50,000
- Surface: Hard / outdoor
- Location: Grove City, Columbus, Ohio, United States
- Venue: Buckeye Boys Ranch

Champions

Singles
- (Mexico) Raúl Ramírez

Doubles
- (India) Anand Amritraj / (India) Vijay Amritraj
← 1973 ·	Columbus Open	· 1975 →

The 1974 City National Buckeye Championships was a men's tennis tournament played on outdoor hard courts at the Buckeye Boys Ranch in Grove City, Columbus, Ohio in the United States that was part of Group B of the 1974 Grand Prix circuit. It was the fifth edition of the tournament and was held from August 13 through August 19, 1974. Fourth-seeded Raúl Ramírez won his second consecutive singles title at the event and earned $9,000 first-prize money.

== Finals ==
=== Singles ===
(Mexico) Raúl Ramírez defeated (United States) Roscoe Tanner 3–6, 7–6^{(7–3)}, 6–4

- It was Ramírez' 1st singles title of the year and 3rd of his career.

=== Doubles ===
(India) Anand Amritraj / (India) Vijay Amritraj defeated (United States) Tom Gorman / (United States) Bob Lutz walkover
