= 1974 World Championship Tennis Finals – Singles =

Singles
- 1974 World Championship Tennis Finals

Final
- Champion: (Australia) John Newcombe
- Runner-up: (Sweden) Björn Borg
- Score: 4–6, 6–3, 6–3, 6–2

Details
- Draw: 8
- Seeds: 8

Events
Singles
← 1973 ·	World Championship Tennis Finals	· 1975 →

Stan Smith was the defending champion but lost in the semifinals to John Newcombe.

Newcombe won in the final 4–6, 6–3, 6–3, 6–2 against Björn Borg.

== Seeds ==
A champion seed is indicated in bold text while text in italics indicates the round in which that seed was eliminated.

1. (Australia) Rod Laver (quarterfinals)
2. (Sweden) Björn Borg (final)
3. (Romania) Ilie Năstase (quarterfinals)
4. (Australia) **John Newcombe (champion)**
5. (Netherlands) Tom Okker (quarterfinals)
6. (Czechoslovakia) Jan Kodeš (semifinals)
7. (United States) Arthur Ashe (quarterfinals)
8. (United States) Stan Smith (semifinals)

== Draw ==
=== Key ===
- Q = Qualifier
- WC = Wild card
- LL = Lucky loser
- Alt = Alternate
- SE = Special exempt
- PR = Protected ranking
- ITF = ITF entry
- JE = Junior exempt
- w/o = Walkover
- r = Retired
- d = Defaulted
- SR = Special ranking

Quarterfinals
1	(Australia) Rod Laver	**7^{8}**	4	4	5
8	(United States) **Stan Smith**	6^{6}	**6**	**6**	**7**
4	(Australia) **John Newcombe**	**6**	**6**	**6**
5	(Netherlands) Tom Okker	3	3	2
6	(Czechoslovakia) **Jan Kodeš**	**7^{7}**	**6**	**7**
3	(Romania) Ilie Năstase	6^{3}	1	5
7	(United States) Arthur Ashe	5	4	6^{6}
2	(Sweden) **Björn Borg**	**7**	**6**	**7^{8}**

Semifinals
8	(United States) Stan Smith	1	**6**	6^{3}	2
4	(Australia) **John Newcombe**	**6**	3	**7^{7}**	**6**
6	(Czechoslovakia) Jan Kodeš	**6**	4	3	2
2	(Sweden) **Björn Borg**	4	**6**	**6**	**6**

Final
4	(Australia) **John Newcombe**	4	**6**	**6**	**6**
2	(Sweden) Björn Borg	**6**	3	3	2
