= 1974 Volvo International – Doubles =

Doubles
- 1974 Volvo International

Final
- Champions: (United States) Jeff Borowiak (Australia) Rod Laver
- Runners-up: (France) Georges Goven (France) François Jauffret
- Score: 6–3, 6–2

Details
- Draw: 16
- Seeds: 4

Events
Singles	Doubles
← 1973 ·	Volvo International	· 1975 →

Rod Laver and Fred Stolle were the defending champions but only Laver competed that year with Jeff Borowiak.

Borowiak and Laver won in the final 6–3, 6–2 against Georges Goven and François Jauffret.

== Seeds ==
Champion seeds are indicated in bold text while text in italics indicates the round in which those seeds were eliminated.

1. (Chile) Patricio Cornejo / (Chile) Jaime Fillol (semifinals)
2. (India) Anand Amritraj / (India) Vijay Amritraj (quarterfinals)
3. (United States) **Jeff Borowiak** / (Australia) **Rod Laver (champions)**
4. (Egypt) Ismail El Shafei / (United States) Paul Gerken (first round)

== Draw ==
=== Key ===
- Q = Qualifier
- WC = Wild card
- LL = Lucky loser
- Alt = Alternate
- SE = Special exempt
- PR = Protected ranking
- ITF = ITF entry
- JE = Junior exempt
- w/o = Walkover
- r = Retired
- d = Defaulted
- SR = Special ranking

First round
1	(Chile) **P Cornejo** (Chile) **J Fillol**	4	**7**	**6**
(India) As Amritraj (United States) T Hoehn	**6**	6	4
(United States) D Crawford (United States) A Neely	6	4
(United States) **E Dibbs** (United States) **H Solomon**	**7**	**6**
3	(United States) **J Borowiak** (Australia) **R Laver**	3	**6**	**6**
(United States) M Powers (United States) S Siegel	**6**	1	2
(Colombia) **I Molina** (Colombia) **J Velasco, Sr.**	**7**	**7**
(Sweden) J-E Lundquist (Sweden) T Svensson	6	6
(France) **G Goven** (France) **F Jauffret**	**6**	4	**7**
(United States) S Krulevitz (United Kingdom) J Lloyd	3	**6**	5
(United States) **J Andrews** (United States) **R Fisher**	**6**	**6**
4	(Egypt) I El Shafei (United States) P Gerken	3	4
(Australia) **J Alexander** (Australia) **P Doerner**	**6**	**6**
(West Germany) C Kuhnke (Australia) B Phillips-Moore	2	2
(South Africa) B Bertram (United States) S Turner	**6**	3	3
2	(India) **An Amritraj** (India) **V Amritraj**	4	**6**	**6**

Quarterfinals
1	(Chile) **P Cornejo** (Chile) **J Fillol**	6	**7**	**6**
(United States) E Dibbs (United States) H Solomon	**7**	6	4
3	(United States) **J Borowiak** (Australia) **R Laver**	**7**	**6**
(Colombia) I Molina (Colombia) J Velasco, Sr.	6	2
(France) **G Goven** (France) **F Jauffret**	5	**7**	**6**
(United States) J Andrews (United States) R Fisher	**7**	6	2
(Australia) **J Alexander** (Australia) **P Doerner**	**6**	**6**
2	(India) An Amritraj (India) V Amritraj	3	4

Semifinals
1	(Chile) P Cornejo (Chile) J Fillol	6	5
3	(United States) **J Borowiak** (Australia) **R Laver**	**7**	**7**
(France) **G Goven** (France) **F Jauffret**	**6**	**7**
(Australia) J Alexander (Australia) P Doerner	4	6

Final
3	(United States) **J Borowiak** (Australia) **R Laver**	**6**	**6**
(France) G Goven (France) F Jauffret	3	2
