= 1974 WCT World Doubles =

- Date: May 2–5
- Edition: 2nd
- Category: World Championship Tennis
- Draw: 8D
- Prize money: $80,000
- Surface: Carpet / indoor
- Location: Montreal, Quebec, Canada
- Venue: Maurice Richard Arena

Champions

Doubles
- (South Africa) Bob Hewitt / (South Africa) Frew McMillan
- WCT World Doubles

The 1974 WCT World Doubles, also known by its sponsored name Rothman's World Doubles Championship, was a men's tennis tournament played on indoor carpet courts at the Maurice Richard Arena in Montreal, Canada that was part of the 1974 World Championship Tennis circuit. It was the tour finals for the doubles season of the WCT Tour and featured the eight (Note: The two top-ranking teams from each of the three WCT groups (Red, Blue, Green) qualified plus the next two highest ranking teams from any of these groups.) top-ranking teams. It was the second edition of the tournament and was held from May 2 through May 5, 1974. The South African team of Bob Hewitt and Frew McMillan won the title and earned $40,000 first-prize money.

== Final ==
=== Doubles ===
(South Africa) Bob Hewitt / (South Africa) Frew McMillan defeated (Australia) Owen Davidson / (Australia) John Newcombe 6–2, 6–7^{(6–8)}, 6–1, 6–2

== See also ==
- 1974 World Championship Tennis Finals
