= 1974 Australian Indoor Championships – Doubles =

Doubles
- 1974 Australian Indoor Championships

Final
- Champions: (Australia) Ross Case (Australia) Geoff Masters
- Runners-up: (Australia) John Newcombe (Australia) Tony Roche
- Score: 6–4, 6–4

Events
Singles	Doubles
← 1973 ·	Australian Indoor Championships	· 1975 →

Rod Laver and John Newcombe were the defending champions but only Newcombe competed that year with Tony Roche. Newcombe and Roche lost in the final 6–4, 6–4 to Ross Case and Geoff Masters.

== Seeds ==
1. (Australia) John Newcombe / (Australia) Tony Roche (final)
2. (Australia) Ross Case / (Australia) Geoff Masters (champions)
3. (West Germany) Jürgen Fassbender / (West Germany) Hans-Jürgen Pohmann (semifinals)
4. (Australia) Dick Crealy / (New Zealand) Onny Parun (quarterfinals)

== Draw ==
=== Key ===
- Q = Qualifier
- WC = Wild card
- LL = Lucky loser
- Alt = Alternate
- ITF = ITF entry
- PR = Protected ranking
- SR = Special ranking
- SE = Special exempt
- JE = Junior exempt
- JR = Junior Accelerator Programme entrant
- CO = College Accelerator Programme entrant
- NG = Next Gen Accelerator Program entrant
- w/o = Walkover
- r = Retired
- d = Defaulted

=== Main draw ===
First round
1	(Australia) J Newcombe (Australia) T Roche	7	7
(United States) J Austin (United States) F McNair	5	6
(Egypt) I El Shafei (United States) R Tanner	6	6
(Australia) W Bowrey (Australia) P Dent	1	4
4	(Australia) D Crealy (New Zealand) O Parun	6	1	6
(United States) S Stewart (United States) D Stockton	4	6	3
(Australia) B Giltinan (Australia) K Warwick	6	4
(Australia) S Ball (Australia) A Stone	7	6
(United States) M Estep (Australia) P Kronk	6	7
(Australia) L Hoad (Australia) K Rosewall	3	5
(New Zealand) B Fairlie (Australia) F Stolle	6	3	5
3	(West Germany) J Fassbender (West Germany) H-J Pohmann	3	6	7
(United States) G R Reid (Australia) R Ruffels	7	2	3
(Australia) B Carmichael (Australia) C Dibley	5	6	6
(Australia) M Anderson (United States) C Richey	3	7	2
2	(Australia) R Case (Australia) G Masters	6	5	6

Quarterfinals
1	(Australia) J Newcombe (Australia) T Roche	6	6
(Egypt) I El Shafei (United States) R Tanner	4	3
4	(Australia) D Crealy (New Zealand) O Parun	6	3
(Australia) S Ball (Australia) A Stone	7	6
(United States) M Estep (Australia) P Kronk	7	2	3
3	(West Germany) J Fassbender (West Germany) H-J Pohmann	5	6	6
(Australia) B Carmichael (Australia) C Dibley	7	2	3
2	(Australia) R Case (Australia) G Masters	5	6	6

Semifinals
1	(Australia) J Newcombe (Australia) T Roche	6	6
(Australia) S Ball (Australia) A Stone	4	4
3	(West Germany) J Fassbender (West Germany) H-J Pohmann	5	1
2	(Australia) R Case (Australia) G Masters	7	6

Final
1	(Australia) J Newcombe (Australia) T Roche	4	4
2	(Australia) R Case (Australia) G Masters	6	6
