= 1974 Volvo International – Singles =

Singles
- 1974 Volvo International

Final
- Champion: (Australia) Rod Laver
- Runner-up: (United States) Harold Solomon
- Score: 6–4, 6–3

Details
- Draw: 32
- Seeds: 8

Events
Singles	Doubles
← 1973 ·	Volvo International	· 1975 →

Vijay Amritraj was the defending champion but lost in the semifinals to Harold Solomon.

Rod Laver won in the final 6–4, 6–3 against Solomon.

== Seeds ==
A champion seed is indicated in bold text while text in italics indicates the round in which that seed was eliminated.

1. (Australia) **Rod Laver (champion)**
2. (United States) Harold Solomon (final)
3. (United States) Eddie Dibbs (quarterfinals)
4. (India) Vijay Amritraj (semifinals)
5. (Chile) Jaime Fillol (second round)
6. (Australia) John Alexander (semifinals)
7. (Egypt) Ismail El Shafei (first round)
8. (France) François Jauffret (quarterfinals)

== Draw ==
=== Key ===
- Q = Qualifier
- WC = Wild card
- LL = Lucky loser
- Alt = Alternate
- SE = Special exempt
- PR = Protected ranking
- ITF = ITF entry
- JE = Junior exempt
- w/o = Walkover
- r = Retired
- d = Defaulted
- SR = Special ranking

First round
1	(Australia) **R Laver**	**6**	**6**
(United Kingdom) J Lloyd	4	3
(United States) **M Powers**	3	**6**	**7**
(India) Ashok Amritraj	**6**	2	6
(Australia) C Dibley	2	4
(United States) **P Gerken**	**6**	**6**
(India) **Anand Amritraj**	4	**7**	**6**
7	(Egypt) I El Shafei	**6**	6	4
3	(United States) **E Dibbs**	**6**	1	**6**
(United States) A Neely	0	**6**	4
(South Africa) B Bertram	4	2
(France) **G Goven**	**6**	**6**
(Colombia) **I Molina**	**6**	**6**
(United States) J Holladay	3	3
(West Germany) C Kuhnke	2	1
6	(Australia) **J Alexander**	**6**	**6**
5	(Chile) **J Fillol**	**6**	**6**
(Australia) B Phillips-Moore	3	0
(United States) R Fisher	3	3
(United States) **J Borowiak**	**6**	**6**
(United States) S Siegel	5	5
(Chile) **P Cornejo**	**7**	**7**
(United States) S Turner	6	0
4	(India) **V Amritraj**	**7**	**6**
8	(France) **F Jauffret**	4	**6**	**7**
(United States) D Crawford	**6**	1	6
(United States) S Krulevitz	2	**7**	2
(Sweden) **J-E Lundquist**	**6**	6	**6**
(Colombia) **J Velasco, Sr.**	**6**	**7**
(Sweden) T Svensson	1	6
(United States) J Andrews	1	**7**	2
2	(United States) **H Solomon**	**6**	6	**6**

Second round
1	(Australia) **R Laver**	**6**	**6**
(United States) M Powers	1	0
(United States) P Gerken	1	4
(India) **Anand Amritraj**	**6**	**6**
3	(United States) **E Dibbs**	**6**	4	**6**
(France) G Goven	2	**6**	2
(Colombia) I Molina	2	5
6	(Australia) **J Alexander**	**6**	**7**
5	(Chile) J Fillol	6	**6**	2
(United States) **J Borowiak**	**7**	0	**6**
(Chile) P Cornejo	**6**	3	3
4	(India) **V Amritraj**	0	**6**	**6**
8	(France) **F Jauffret**	4	**6**	**6**
(Sweden) J-E Lundquist	**6**	3	2
(Colombia) J Velasco, Sr.	2	6
2	(United States) **H Solomon**	**6**	**7**

Quarterfinals
1	(Australia) **R Laver**	**6**	**6**
(India) Anand Amritraj	4	3
3	(United States) E Dibbs	2	3
6	(Australia) **J Alexander**	**6**	**6**
(United States) J Borowiak	**6**	4	3
4	(India) **V Amritraj**	3	**6**	**6**
8	(France) F Jauffret	5	2
2	(United States) **H Solomon**	**7**	**6**

Semifinals
1	(Australia) **R Laver**	4	**6**	**6**
6	(Australia) J Alexander	**6**	4	4
4	(India) V Amritraj	1	3
2	(United States) **H Solomon**	**6**	**6**

Final
1	(Australia) **Rod Laver**	**6**	**6**
2	(United States) Harold Solomon	4	3
