= 1974 Trofeo Vat 69 =

Tennis tournament

- Date: 6–12 May
- Edition: 2nd
- Category: Grand Prix (Group C)
- Draw: 32S / 16D
- Prize money: $25,000
- Surface: Clay / outdoor
- Location: Florence, Italy

Champions

Singles
- (Italy) Adriano Panatta

Doubles
- (Italy) Paolo Bertolucci / (Italy) Adriano Panatta
- ATP Florence

The 1974 Trofeo Vat 69 was a men's tennis tournament played on outdoor clay courts in Florence, Italy that was part of the Group C tier of the 1974 Commercial Union Assurance Grand Prix circuit. It was the second edition of the tournament and was played from 6 May until 12 May 1974. Adriano Panatta won the singles title.

== Finals ==
=== Singles ===
(Italy) Adriano Panatta defeated (Italy) Paolo Bertolucci 6–3, 6–1

- It was Panatta's 1st singles title of the year and the 3rd of his career.

=== Doubles ===
(Italy) Paolo Bertolucci / (Italy) Adriano Panatta defeated (Hungary) Róbert Machán / (Hungary) Balázs Taróczy 6–3, 3–6, 6–4
