= 1974 Australian Indoor Championships – Singles =

Singles
- 1974 Australian Indoor Championships

Final
- Champion: (Australia) John Newcombe
- Runner-up: (United States) Cliff Richey
- Score: 6–4, 6–3, 6–4

Details
- Draw: 32
- Seeds: 8

Events
| Singles | Doubles |
| ← 1973 · | Australian Indoor Tennis Championships | · 1975 → |

Rod Laver was the defending singles champion at the Australian Indoor Tennis Championships but did not compete that year. First-seeded John Newcombe won in the final 6–4, 6–3, 6–4 against Cliff Richey. Richey threatened to quit the match after being called for a foot fault but eventually played on when the linesman was changed. The final was the best of 5 sets while all other rounds were the best of 3 sets.

== Seeds ==
1. (Australia) John Newcombe (champion)
2. (Australia) Ken Rosewall (semifinals)
3. (United States) Roscoe Tanner (quarterfinals)
4. (United States) Dick Stockton (first round)
5. (Australia) Tony Roche (semifinals)
6. (United States) Cliff Richey (final)
7. (Australia) Phil Dent (quarterfinals)
8. (New Zealand) Onny Parun (quarterfinals)

== Draw ==
=== Key ===
- Q = Qualifier
- WC = Wild card
- LL = Lucky loser
- Alt = Alternate
- SE = Special exempt
- PR = Protected ranking
- ITF = ITF entry
- JE = Junior exempt
- w/o = Walkover
- r = Retired
- d = Defaulted
- SR = Special ranking

Semifinals
1 | (Australia) John Newcombe | 4 | 6 | 6
5 | (Australia) Tony Roche | 6 | 1 | 4
6 | (United States) Cliff Richey | 7 | 5 | 6
2 | (Australia) Ken Rosewall | 6 | 7 | 1

Final
1 | (Australia) John Newcombe | 6 | 6 | 6
6 | (United States) Cliff Richey | 4 | 3 | 4

=== Top half ===
First round
1 | (Australia) J Newcombe | 6 | 6
(Australia) R Ruffels | 4 | 4
(United States) M Estep | 6 | 6
(Australia) P Kronk | 3 | 1
(Australia) C Dibley | 6 | 6 | 4
(Australia) R Case | 3 | 7 | 6
(United States) S Stewart | 7 | 6 | 4
8 | (New Zealand) O Parun | 5 | 7 | 6
4 | (United States) D Stockton | 6 | 4
(Australia) A Stone | 7 | 6
(West Germany) H-J Pohmann | 6 | 3
(Australia) F Stolle | 7 | 6
(Australia) G Masters | 4 | 6 | 1
(United States) F McNair | 6 | 3 | 6
(Australia) S Ball | 4 | 5
5 | (Australia) T Roche | 6 | 7

Second round
1 | (Australia) J Newcombe | 6 | 7
(United States) M Estep | 1 | 6
(Australia) R Case | 2 | 6
8 | (New Zealand) O Parun | 6 | 7
(Australia) A Stone | 3
(Australia) F Stolle | 1 | d
(United States) F McNair | 2 | 4
5 | (Australia) T Roche | 6 | 6

Quarterfinals
1 | (Australia) J Newcombe | 7 | 6
8 | (New Zealand) O Parun | 6 | 3
(Australia) A Stone | 6 | 6 | 1
5 | (Australia) T Roche | 7 | 4 | 6

Semifinals
1 | (Australia) J Newcombe | 4 | 6 | 6
5 | (Australia) T Roche | 6 | 1 | 4

=== Bottom half ===
First round
6 | (United States) C Richey | 6 | 6
(United States) J Austin | 1 | 4
(United States) G R Reid | 6 | 6
(West Germany) J Fassbender | 2 | 3
(Egypt) I El Shafei | 7 | 6
(Australia) K Warwick | 6 | 4
(Australia) D Crealy | 2 | 3
3 | (United States) R Tanner | 6 | 6
7 | (Australia) P Dent | 7 | 6
(Australia) C Kachel | 6 | 2
(Australia) W Bowrey | 6 | 7
(Australia) B Giltinan | 2 | 6
(Australia) M Anderson | 1 | 3
(Australia) B Carmichael | 6 | 6
(New Zealand) B Fairlie | 6 | 2
2 | (Australia) K Rosewall | 7 | 6

Second round
6 | (United States) C Richey | 6 | 6
(United States) G R Reid | 1 | 2
(Egypt) I El Shafei | 2 | 4
3 | (United States) R Tanner | 6 | 6
7 | (Australia) P Dent | 3 | 7 | 6
(Australia) W Bowrey | 6 | 6 | 2
(Australia) B Carmichael | 5 | 4
2 | (Australia) K Rosewall | 7 | 6

Quarterfinals
6 | (United States) C Richey | 5 | 6 | 6
3 | (United States) R Tanner | 7 | 2 | 3
7 | (Australia) P Dent | 5 | 6
2 | (Australia) K Rosewall | 7 | 7

Semifinals
6 | (United States) C Richey | 7 | 5 | 6
2 | (Australia) K Rosewall | 6 | 7 | 1
