= 1974 Viceroy Classic =

Tennis tournament

- Date: 4–10 November
- Edition: 2nd
- Category: Grand Prix (Group B)
- Draw: 32S / 16D
- Prize money: $50,000
- Surface: Hard / outdoor
- Location: Hong Kong

Champions

Singles
- No champions

Doubles
- No champions
- Hong Kong Open

The 1974 Viceroy Classic, also known as the Hong Kong Open, was a men's tennis tournament played on outdoor hard courts in Hong Kong. It was the second edition of the event and was held from 4 November through 10 November 1974. The tournament was part of the Group B category of the 1974 Grand Prix tennis circuit. Due to persistent bad weather caused by typhoon Gloria the semifinals and finals were initially postponed by a day but were subsequently cancelled as players had to travel to the next tournament.

== Finals ==
=== Singles ===
- Not played

=== Doubles ===
- Not played
