= 1974 South African Open (tennis) =

- Date: 18–26 November
- Edition: 71st
- Category: Grand Prix AA series
- Draw: 64S
- Prize money: $100,000
- Surface: Hard / outdoor
- Location: Johannesburg, South Africa
- Venue: Ellis Park Tennis Stadium
- Attendance: 107,000

Champions

Men's singles
- (United States) Jimmy Connors

Women's singles
- (Australia) Kerry Melville

Men's doubles
- (South Africa) Bob Hewitt / (South Africa) Frew McMillan

Women's doubles
- (South Africa) Ilana Kloss / (Australia) Kerry Melville
- South African Open

The 1974 South African Open, also known by its sponsored name South African Breweries Open, was a combined men's and women's tennis tournament played on outdoor hard courts in Johannesburg, South Africa that was part of the 1974 Commercial Union Assurance Grand Prix. It was the 71st edition of the tournament and was held from 18 November through 26 November 1974. Jimmy Connors and Kerry Melville won the singles titles.

== Finals ==
=== Men's singles ===
(United States) Jimmy Connors defeated (United States) Arthur Ashe 7–6, 6–3, 6–1

=== Women's singles ===
(Australia) Kerry Melville defeated (Australia) Dianne Fromholtz 6–3, 7–5

=== Men's doubles ===
(South Africa) Bob Hewitt / (South Africa) Frew McMillan defeated (Netherlands) Tom Okker / (United States) Marty Riessen 7–5, 6–4, 6–3

=== Women's doubles ===
(South Africa) Ilana Kloss / (Australia) Kerry Melville defeated (Australia) Margaret Court / (Australia) Dianne Fromholtz 6–2, 6–3
