= 1974 Commercial Union Assurance Masters =

- Date: 10–15 December
- Edition: 5th
- Category: Masters
- Draw: 8S
- Prize money: $100,000
- Surface: Grass / outdoor
- Location: Melbourne, Australia

Champions

Singles
- (Argentina) Guillermo Vilas
- ATP Finals

The 1974 Masters (also known as the 1974 Commercial Union Assurance Masters for sponsorship reasons) was a men's tennis tournament played on outdoor grass courts in Kooyong, Melbourne in Australia. It was the fifth edition of the Masters Grand Prix and was held from 10 December through 15 December 1974. Guillermo Vilas won the title.

== Finals ==
=== Singles ===
(Argentina) Guillermo Vilas defeated (Romania) Ilie Năstase, 7–6^{(8–6)}, 6–2, 3–6, 3–6, 6–4.

- It was Vilas' 7th singles title of the year and the 8th of his career.

== See also ==
- 1974 World Championship Tennis Finals
- 1974 WCT World Doubles
