= Mike Powers (tennis) =

American tennis player

- Country (sports): United States
- Born: September 24, 1950 (age 75)
- Height: 5 ft 10 in (178 cm)

Singles
- Career record: 1–4
- Highest ranking: No. 210 (Nov 6, 1974)

Grand Slam singles results
- French Open: Q1 (1975)

Mike Powers (born September 24, 1950) is an American former professional tennis player.

Powers, a native of Glen Cove, New York, played on the hockey and tennis teams at Brown University. He was an All-Ivy first-team selection for singles in 1973 and on the professional tour had a best world ranking of 210. At the 1974 Volvo International in Bretton Woods he saved a match point to defeat Wimbledon junior finalist Ashok Amritraj in the first round, before falling in his next match to Rod Laver.
