= 1974 Trofeo Vat 69 – Singles =

Singles
- 1974 Trofeo Vat 69

Final
- Champion: (Italy) Adriano Panatta
- Runner-up: (Italy) Paolo Bertolucci
- Score: 6–3, 6–1

Details
- Draw: 32

Events
Singles	Doubles
← 1973 ·	ATP Florence	· 1975 →

The 1974 Trofeo Vat 69 – Singles was an event of the 1974 Trofeo Vat 69 men's tennis tournament and was played on outdoor clay courts in Florence, Italy between 6 May and 12 May 1974. The draw comprised 32 players. Ilie Năstase was the defending ATP Florence singles champion but did not compete in this edition. Adriano Panatta won the title by defeating Paolo Bertolucci in the final, 6–3, 6–1.

== Draw ==
=== Key ===
- Q = Qualifier
- WC = Wild card
- LL = Lucky loser
- Alt = Alternate
- SE = Special exempt
- PR = Protected ranking
- ITF = ITF entry
- JE = Junior exempt
- w/o = Walkover
- r = Retired
- d = Defaulted
- SR = Special ranking

=== Finals ===
Semifinals
(Italy) Paolo Bertolucci	5	6	6
(New Zealand) Onny Parun	7	4	1
(Argentina) Julián Ganzábal	6	5	2
(Italy) Adriano Panatta	3	7	6

Final
(Italy) Paolo Bertolucci	3	1
(Italy) Adriano Panatta	6	6

=== Top half ===
First Round
(Italy) Paolo Bertolucci	6	5	6
(Italy) Marco Consolini	3	7	1
(Sweden) Tenny Svensson	6	7
(Australia) Paul Kronk	0	6
(Sweden) Kjell Johansson	2	6	6
(Socialist Federal Republic of Yugoslavia) Nikola Špear	6	4	1
(Italy) Piero Toci	6	5	6
(New Zealand) Jeff Simpson	4	7	7
(New Zealand) Onny Parun	7	6
(Italy) Pietro Marzano	5	3
(Sweden) Birger Andersson	1	4
(Hungary) Balázs Taróczy	6	6
(Italy) Tonino Zugarelli	6	6
(France) Jean-Louis Haillet	3	4
(Japan) Jun Kuki	2	0
(Sweden) Leif Johansson	6	6

Second Round
(Italy) Paolo Bertolucci	6	6
(Sweden) Tenny Svensson	1	3
(Sweden) Kjell Johansson	3	1
(New Zealand) Jeff Simpson	6	6
(New Zealand) Onny Parun	6	6
(Hungary) Balázs Taróczy	1	3
(Italy) Tonino Zugarelli	2	0
(Sweden) Leif Johansson	6	6

Quarterfinals
(Italy) Paolo Bertolucci	6	6
(New Zealand) Jeff Simpson	2	1
(New Zealand) Onny Parun	6	6
(Sweden) Leif Johansson	1	4

Semifinals
(Italy) Paolo Bertolucci	5	6	6
(New Zealand) Onny Parun	7	4	1

=== Bottom half ===
First Round
(Italy) Corrado Barazzutti	3	6	7
(Argentina) Lito Álvarez	6	2	5
(Hungary) Péter Szőke	3	6	5
(Australia) Barry Phillips-Moore	6	1	7
(France) Éric Deblicker	6	4	3
(Argentina) Julián Ganzábal	3	6	6
(Hungary) Róbert Machán	6	6
(Italy) Martin Mulligan	2	0
(Italy) Vincenzo Franchitti	6	7
(United States) Robert Kreiss	1	5
(United States) Steve Krulevitz	5	7	6
(Australia) Dick Crealy	7	5	4
(Chile) Patricio Rodríguez	0	5
(Italy) Ezio Di Matteo	6	7
(France) Christophe Casa	1	2
(Italy) Adriano Panatta	6	6

Second Round
(Italy) Corrado Barazzutti	6	5	3
(Australia) Barry Phillips-Moore	3	7	6
(Argentina) Julián Ganzábal	7	7
(Hungary) Róbert Machán	5	6
(Italy) Vincenzo Franchitti	6	6
(United States) Steve Krulevitz	4	3
(Italy) Ezio Di Matteo	2	1
(Italy) Adriano Panatta	6	6

Quarterfinals
(Australia) Barry Phillips-Moore	2	3
(Argentina) Julián Ganzábal	6	6
(Italy) Vincenzo Franchitti	6	2
(Italy) Adriano Panatta	7	6

Semifinals
(Argentina) Julián Ganzábal	6	5	2
(Italy) Adriano Panatta	3	7	6
