= 1974 Trofeo Vat 69 – Doubles =

Doubles
- 1974 Trofeo Vat 69

Final
- Champion: (Italy) Paolo Bertolucci (Italy) Adriano Panatta
- Runner-up: (Hungary) Róbert Machán (Hungary) Balázs Taróczy
- Score: 6–3, 3–6, 6–4

Details
- Draw: 16

Events
| Singles | Doubles |
| ← 1973 · | ATP Florence | · 1975 → |

The 1974 Trofeo Vat 69 – Doubles was an event of the 1974 Trofeo Vat 69 men's tennis tournament and was played on outdoor clay courts in Florence, Italy between 6 May and 12 May 1974. The draw consisted of 16 teams. Paolo Bertolucci and Adriano Panatta were the defending ATP Florence doubles champions and regained the title by defeating Róbert Machán and Balázs Taróczy in the final, 6–3, 3–6, 6–4.

== Draw ==
=== Key ===
- Q = Qualifier
- WC = Wild card
- LL = Lucky loser
- Alt = Alternate
- SE = Special exempt
- PR = Protected ranking
- ITF = ITF entry
- JE = Junior exempt
- w/o = Walkover
- r = Retired
- d = Defaulted
- SR = Special ranking

First Round
(Hungary) Róbert Machán (Hungary) Balázs Taróczy | 3 | 6 | 6
(Sweden) Birger Andersson (Sweden) Tenny Svensson | 6 | 2 | 4
(France) Christophe Casa (France) Éric Deblicker | 2 | 6 | 6
(Italy) Ezio Di Matteo (Italy) Piero Toci | 6 | 3 | 3
(New Zealand) Onny Parun (New Zealand) Jeff Simpson | 6 | 7
(United States) Robert Kreiss (United States) Steve Krulevitz | 3 | 5
(Socialist Federal Republic of Yugoslavia) Nikola Špear (Hungary) Péter Szőke | 6 | 1 | 6
(Sweden) Leif Johansson (Japan) Jun Kuki | 4 | 6 | 1
(France) Jean-Louis Haillet (Sweden) Kjell Johansson | 6 | 3 | 2
(Italy) Corrado Barazzutti (Italy) Tonino Zugarelli | 4 | 6 | 6
(Italy) Vincenzo Franchitti (Italy) Pietro Marzano | 6 | 6
(Australia) Dick Crealy (Australia) Barry Phillips-Moore | 1 | 4
(Argentina) Lito Álvarez (Argentina) Julián Ganzábal | 7 | 6
(Australia) Paul Kronk (Socialist Federal Republic of Yugoslavia) Unknown | 6 | 4
(Venezuela) Jorge Andrew (Italy) Marco Consolini | 3 | 3
(Italy) Paolo Bertolucci (Italy) Adriano Panatta | 6 | 6

Quarterfinals
(Hungary) Róbert Machán (Hungary) Balázs Taróczy | 6 | 6
(France) Christophe Casa (France) Éric Deblicker | 2 | 1
(New Zealand) Onny Parun (New Zealand) Jeff Simpson | 6 | 5 | 7
(Socialist Federal Republic of Yugoslavia) Nikola Špear (Hungary) Péter Szőke | 4 | 7 | 5
(Italy) Corrado Barazzutti (Italy) Tonino Zugarelli | 3 | 6
(Italy) Vincenzo Franchitti (Italy) Pietro Marzano | 6 | 7
(Argentina) Lito Álvarez (Argentina) Julián Ganzábal | 6 | 2 | 4
(Italy) Paolo Bertolucci (Italy) Adriano Panatta | 4 | 6 | 6

Semifinals
(Hungary) Róbert Machán (Hungary) Balázs Taróczy | 6 | 6
(New Zealand) Onny Parun (New Zealand) Jeff Simpson | 3 | 1
(Italy) Vincenzo Franchitti (Italy) Pietro Marzano | 6 | 2 | 4
(Italy) Paolo Bertolucci (Italy) Adriano Panatta | 4 | 6 | 6

Final
(Hungary) Róbert Machán (Hungary) Balázs Taróczy | 3 | 6 | 4
(Italy) Paolo Bertolucci (Italy) Adriano Panatta | 6 | 3 | 6
