= 1974 Pacific Southwest Open – Singles =

Singles
- 1974 Pacific Southwest Open

Final
- Champion: (United States) Jimmy Connors
- Runner-up: (United States) Harold Solomon
- Score: 6–3, 6–1

Details
- Draw: 64
- Seeds: 16

Events
Singles	Doubles
- Los Angeles Open

The 1974 Pacific Southwest Open – Singles was an event of the 1974 Pacific Southwest Open tennis tournament and was played on outdoor hard courts at the Los Angeles Tennis Club in Los Angeles, in the United States, between September 16 and September 22, 1974. The draw comprised 64 players of which 16 were seeded. First-seeded Jimmy Connors was the defending Pacific Southwest Open singles champion and he retained his title by defeating seventh-seeded Harold Solomon in the final, 6–3, 6–1.

== Seeds ==
1. (United States) Jimmy Connors (champion)
2. (United States) Stan Smith (first round)
3. (United States) Arthur Ashe (quarterfinals)
4. (United States) Marty Riessen (first round)
5. (United States) Roscoe Tanner (quarterfinals)
6. (United States) Tom Gorman (semifinals)
7. (United States) Harold Solomon (final)
8. (United States) Eddie Dibbs (first round)
9. (Mexico) Raúl Ramírez (quarterfinals)
10. (Australia) John Alexander (third round)
11. (Chile) Jaime Fillol (third round)
12. (Rhodesia) Andrew Pattison (semifinals)
13. (New Zealand) Onny Parun (first round)
14. (Australia) Ross Case (third round)
15. (United States) Brian Gottfried (third round)
16. (Australia) Roy Emerson (third round)

Click on the seed number of a player to go to their draw section.

== Draw ==
Key

- Q = Qualifier
- WC = Wild card
- LL = Lucky loser
- Alt = Alternate
- ITF = ITF entry
- PR = Protected ranking
- SR = Special ranking
- SE = Special exempt
- JE = Junior exempt
- JR = Junior Accelerator Programme entrant
- CO = College Accelerator Programme entrant
- NG = Next Gen Accelerator Program entrant
- w/o = Walkover
- r = Retired
- d = Defaulted

=== Finals ===
Quarterfinals
1	(United States) Jimmy Connors	7	6	6
(United States) Jeff Borowiak	6	7	1
12	(Rhodesia) Andrew Pattison	2	6	6
5	(United States) Roscoe Tanner	6	4	3
6	(United States) Tom Gorman	6	6
3	(United States) Arthur Ashe	2	2
7	(United States) Harold Solomon	7	6
9	(Mexico) Raúl Ramírez	5	4

Semifinals
1	(United States) Jimmy Connors	7	7
12	(Rhodesia) Andrew Pattison	5	6
6	(United States) Tom Gorman	6	6	0
7	(United States) Harold Solomon	2	7	6

Final
1	(United States) Jimmy Connors	6	6
7	(United States) Harold Solomon	3	1

=== Top half ===
==== Section 1 ====
First Round
1	(United States) Jimmy Connors	6	5	7
(Australia) Mal Anderson	3	7	6
(New Zealand) Jeff Simpson	3	7	4
(United States) Brian Teacher	6	5	6
14	(Australia) Ross Case	6	6
Q	(United States) Larry Nagler	3	3
(Australia) Allan Stone	6	6
Q	(South Africa) Pat Cramer	1	2
8	(United States) Eddie Dibbs	6	4
(United States) Jeff Borowiak	7	6
LL	(United States) Dennis Ralston	7	7
(United States) Charlie Pasarell	6	5
15	(United States) Brian Gottfried	7	6
(Australia) Colin Dibley	6	4
Q	(United States) John Andrews	6	6
(United States) Fred McNair	4	4

Second Round
1	(United States) Jimmy Connors	6	6	6
(United States) Brian Teacher	2	7	2
14	(Australia) Ross Case	6	6
(Australia) Allan Stone	0	2
(United States) Jeff Borowiak	6	6
LL	(United States) Dennis Ralston	3	2
15	(United States) Brian Gottfried	6	6
Q	(United States) John Andrews	2	2

Third Round
1	(United States) Jimmy Connors	7	6
14	(Australia) Ross Case	6	3
(United States) Jeff Borowiak	6	6
15	(United States) Brian Gottfried	4	3

Quarterfinals
1	(United States) Jimmy Connors	7	6	6
(United States) Jeff Borowiak	6	7	1

==== Section 2 ====
First Round
4	(United States) Marty Riessen	1	7	6
(Australia) Paul Kronk	6	5	7
(Rhodesia) Roger Dowdeswell	7	7
LL	(United States) Rick Fisher	5	5
12	(Rhodesia) Andrew Pattison	6	6
(Australia) Dick Crealy	3	2
(France) Jean-Baptiste Chanfreau	6	2
LL	(United States) Roy Barth	7	6
5	(United States) Roscoe Tanner	6	4	7
(United States) Tom Leonard	3	6	5
(West Germany) Jürgen Fassbender	7	5	6
(Australia) Geoff Masters	5	7	2
10	(Australia) John Alexander	6	6
(United States) Paul Gerken	4	2
(United States) Sherwood Stewart	6	2	6
(United States) Dick R. Bohrnstedt	3	6	2

Second Round
(Australia) Paul Kronk	4	4
(Rhodesia) Roger Dowdeswell	6	6
12	(Rhodesia) Andrew Pattison	6	6
LL	(United States) Roy Barth	3	1
5	(United States) Roscoe Tanner	7	6
(West Germany) Jürgen Fassbender	5	2
10	(Australia) John Alexander	6	6	7
(United States) Sherwood Stewart	2	7	5

Third Round
(Rhodesia) Roger Dowdeswell	2	2
12	(Rhodesia) Andrew Pattison	6	6
5	(United States) Roscoe Tanner	7	7
10	(Australia) John Alexander	5	6

Quarterfinals
12	(Rhodesia) Andrew Pattison	2	6	6
5	(United States) Roscoe Tanner	6	4	3

=== Bottom half ===
==== Section 3 ====
First Round
Q	(Brazil) João Soares	4	5
(United States) Jeff Austin	6	7
Q	(United States) Alex Olmedo	1	2
16	(Australia) Roy Emerson	6	6
(Chile) Patricio Cornejo	6	5	2^{r}
(South Africa) John Yuill	3	7	5
Q	(United Kingdom) Michael Wayman	4	0
6	(United States) Tom Gorman	6	6
(United States) Doug Crawford	6	5	2^{r}
(United States) Billy Martin	3	7	5
(South Africa) Raymond Moore	6	3
11	(Chile) Jaime Fillol	7	6
(Australia) Barry Phillips-Moore	4	5
(United States) William Brown	6	7
(United States) Tom Edlefsen	4	6
3	(United States) Arthur Ashe	6	7

Second Round
(United States) Jeff Austin	5	3
16	(Australia) Roy Emerson	7	6
(South Africa) John Yuill	3	4
6	(United States) Tom Gorman	6	6
(United States) Billy Martin	4	4
11	(Chile) Jaime Fillol	6	6
(United States) William Brown	6	3	1
3	(United States) Arthur Ashe	4	6	6

Third Round
16	(Australia) Roy Emerson	7	4	6
6	(United States) Tom Gorman	6	6	7
11	(Chile) Jaime Fillol	2	4
3	(United States) Arthur Ashe	6	6

Quarterfinals
6	(United States) Tom Gorman	6	6
3	(United States) Arthur Ashe	2	2

==== Section 4 ====
First Round
(United States) Jim McManus	1	2
(United States) Steve Krulevitz	6	6
(United States) Dick Dell	7	3	7
13	(New Zealand) Onny Parun	6	6	5
(Australia) Syd Ball	6	6
Q	(United States) John Fort	1	2
LL	(Mexico) Joaquín Loyo-Mayo	2	2
7	(United States) Harold Solomon	6	6
(Sweden) Leif Johansson	3	2
(United States) Bob Lutz	6	6
(United States) Raz Reid	2	3
9	(Mexico) Raúl Ramírez	6	6
(United States) Robert Kreiss	6	6
(United States) Mike Estep	3	4
(United States) Erik van Dillen	6	2	6
2	(United States) Stan Smith	3	6	2

Second Round
(United States) Steve Krulevitz	6	6
(United States) Dick Dell	0	4
(Australia) Syd Ball	1	1
7	(United States) Harold Solomon	6	6
(United States) Bob Lutz	6	2
9	(Mexico) Raúl Ramírez	7	6
(United States) Robert Kreiss	7	7
(United States) Erik van Dillen	6	5

Third Round
(United States) Steve Krulevitz	6	3	2
7	(United States) Harold Solomon	3	6	6
9	(Mexico) Raúl Ramírez	6	6
(United States) Robert Kreiss	3	1

Quarterfinals
7	(United States) Harold Solomon	7	6
9	(Mexico) Raúl Ramírez	5	4
