= 1974 Commercial Union Assurance Masters – Singles =

Singles
- 1974 Commercial Union Assurance Masters

Final
- Champion: (Argentina) Guillermo Vilas
- Runner-up: (Romania) Ilie Năstase
- Score: 7–6^{(8–6)}, 6–2, 3–6, 3–6, 6–4

Details
- Draw: 8S

Events
Singles
← 1973 ·	ATP Finals	· 1975 →

Guillermo Vilas defeated the three-time defending champion Ilie Năstase in the final, 7–6, 6–2, 3–6, 3–6, 6–4 to win the singles title at the 1974 Commercial Union Assurance Masters.

== Draw ==
=== Key ===
- Q = Qualifier
- WC = Wild card
- LL = Lucky loser
- Alt = Alternate
- SE = Special exempt
- PR = Protected ranking
- ITF = ITF entry
- JE = Junior exempt
- w/o = Walkover
- r = Retired
- d = Defaulted
- SR = Special ranking

=== Finals ===
Semifinals
(Romania) Ilie Năstase	6	7	6
(Australia) John Newcombe	3	6	2
(Mexico) Raúl Ramírez	6	3	2	5
(Argentina) Guillermo Vilas	4	6	6	7

Final
(Romania) Ilie Năstase	6^{6}	2	6	6	4
(Argentina) Guillermo Vilas	7^{8}	6	3	3	6

=== Blue group ===
	(Sweden) Borg	(Australia) Newcombe	(New Zealand) Parun	(Argentina) Vilas	RR; W–L	Set; W–L	Game; W–L	Standings
(Sweden) Björn Borg		6–7, 6–7	3–6, 6–3, 10–8	5–7, 1–6	1–2	2–5	37–44	3
(Australia) John Newcombe	7–6, 7–6		6–4, 6–4	4–6, 6–7	2–1	4–2	36–33	2
(New Zealand) Onny Parun	6–3, 3–6, 8–10	4–6, 4–6		5–7, 6–3, 9–11	0–3	2–6	45–52	4
(Argentina) Guillermo Vilas	7–5, 6–1	6–4, 7–6	7–5, 3–6, 11–9		3–0	6–1	47–36	1

Standings are determined by: 1. number of wins; 2. number of matches; 3. in two-players-ties, head-to-head records; 4. in three-players-ties, percentage of sets won, or of games won; 5. steering-committee decision.

=== White group ===
	(Romania) Năstase	(Spain) Orantes	(Mexico) Ramírez	(United States) Solomon	RR; W–L	Set; W–L	Game; W–L	Standings
(Romania) Ilie Năstase		6–4, 6–2	6–4, 2–6, 6–3	6–3, 6–4	3–0	6–1	38–26	1
(Spain) Manuel Orantes	4–6, 2–6		3–6, 1–6	6–1, 6–1	1–2	2–4	22–26	3
(Mexico) Raúl Ramírez	4–6, 6–2, 3–6	6–3, 6–1		6–1, 6–1	2–1	5–2	37–20	2
(United States) Harold Solomon	3–6, 4–6	1–6, 1–6	1–6, 1–6		0–3	0–6	11–36	4

Standings are determined by: 1. number of wins; 2. number of matches; 3. in two-players-ties, head-to-head records; 4. in three-players-ties, percentage of sets won, or of games won; 5. steering-committee decision.

== See also ==
- ATP World Tour Finals appearances
