= 1974 Pacific Southwest Open – Doubles =

Doubles
- 1974 Pacific Southwest Open

Final
- Champion: (Australia) Ross Case (Australia) Geoff Masters
- Runner-up: (United States) Brian Gottfried (Mexico) Raúl Ramírez
- Score: 6–3, 6–2

Details
- Draw: 32
- Seeds: 8

Events
Singles	Doubles
- Los Angeles Open

The 1974 Pacific Southwest Open – Doubles was an event of the 1974 Pacific Southwest Open tennis tournament and was played on outdoor hard courts at the Los Angeles Tennis Club in Los Angeles, in the United States, between September 16 and September 22, 1974. The draw comprised 32 teams of which eight were seeded. Jan Kodeš and Vladimír Zedník were the defending Pacific Southwest Open doubles champions but did not compete in this edition. The eighth-seeded team of Ross Case and Geoff Masters won the title by defeating the fourth-seeded team of Brian Gottfried and Raúl Ramírez in the final, 6–3, 6–2.

== Seeds ==
1. (United States) Bob Lutz / (United States) Stan Smith (second round)
2. (United States) Pancho Gonzales / (United States) Tom Gorman (second round)
3. (United States) Charlie Pasarell / (United States) Erik van Dillen (first round)
4. (United States) Brian Gottfried / (Mexico) Raúl Ramírez (final)
5. (Chile) Patricio Cornejo / (Chile) Jaime Fillol (quarterfinals)
6. (United States) Arthur Ashe / (United States) Roscoe Tanner (semifinals)
7. (Australia) Dick Crealy / (New Zealand) Onny Parun (quarterfinals)
8. (Australia) Ross Case / (Australia) Geoff Masters (champions)

== Draw ==
Key

- Q = Qualifier
- WC = Wild card
- LL = Lucky loser
- Alt = Alternate
- ITF = ITF entry
- PR = Protected ranking
- SR = Special ranking
- SE = Special exempt
- JE = Junior exempt
- JR = Junior Accelerator Programme entrant
- CO = College Accelerator Programme entrant
- NG = Next Gen Accelerator Program entrant
- w/o = Walkover
- r = Retired
- d = Defaulted

=== Finals ===
Semifinals
(United States) Dennis Ralston (Australia) Allan Stone	5	4
4	(United States) Brian Gottfried (Mexico) Raúl Ramírez	7	6
8	(Australia) Ross Case (Australia) Geoff Masters	7	7
6	(United States) Arthur Ashe (United States) Roscoe Tanner	5	6

Final
4	(United States) Brian Gottfried (Mexico) Raúl Ramírez	3	2
8	(Australia) Ross Case (Australia) Geoff Masters	6	6

=== Top half ===
First Round
1	(United States) Bob Lutz (United States) Stan Smith	7	7
(United States) Eddie Dibbs (United States) Harold Solomon	6	6
(United States) Billy Martin (United States) Alex Olmedo	3	6	4
(United States) Dennis Ralston (Australia) Allan Stone	6	4	6
7	(Australia) Dick Crealy (New Zealand) Onny Parun	6	6
(Australia) Mal Anderson (Australia) Roy Emerson	3	4
(United States) Scott Carnahan (Brazil) João Soares	4	6	6
(United States) Jeff Austin (United States) Fred McNair	6	3	4
4	(United States) Brian Gottfried (Mexico) Raúl Ramírez	6	6
(United States) William Brown (Australia) Paul Kronk	1	4
(United States) Dick R. Bohrnstedt (United States) Mike MacHette	7	6
(United States) Mike Estep (New Zealand) Jeff Simpson	6	2
5	(Chile) Patricio Cornejo (Chile) Jaime Fillol	6	6	6
(United States) Doug Crawford (Sweden) Leif Johansson	4	7	4
(United States) John Andrews (United States) Rick Fisher	2	1
(Australia) Colin Dibley (West Germany) Jürgen Fassbender	6	6

Second Round
1	(United States) Bob Lutz (United States) Stan Smith	2	5
(United States) Dennis Ralston (Australia) Allan Stone	6	7
7	(Australia) Dick Crealy (New Zealand) Onny Parun	7	7
(United States) Scott Carnahan (Brazil) João Soares	5	6
4	(United States) Brian Gottfried (Mexico) Raúl Ramírez	7	6
(United States) Dick R. Bohrnstedt (United States) Mike MacHette	6	2
5	(Chile) Patricio Cornejo (Chile) Jaime Fillol	6	6
(Australia) Colin Dibley (West Germany) Jürgen Fassbender	3	4

Quarterfinals
(United States) Dennis Ralston (Australia) Allan Stone	6	5	7
7	(Australia) Dick Crealy (New Zealand) Onny Parun	4	7	6
4	(United States) Brian Gottfried (Mexico) Raúl Ramírez	7	6
5	(Chile) Patricio Cornejo (Chile) Jaime Fillol	6	1

Semifinals
(United States) Dennis Ralston (Australia) Allan Stone	5	4
4	(United States) Brian Gottfried (Mexico) Raúl Ramírez	7	6

=== Bottom half ===
First Round
(Rhodesia) Roger Dowdeswell (United States) Steve Krulevitz	6	3	7
(United States) Gene Stuart Malin (United States) Steve Messmer	3	6	6
(United States) Tom Edlefsen (United States) Tom Leonard	7	3	4
8	(Australia) Ross Case (Australia) Geoff Masters	6	6	6
(United States) Roy Barth (South Africa) John Yuill	6	4	3
(Australia) John Alexander (Australia) Syd Ball	4	6	6
(South Africa) Raymond Moore (Rhodesia) Andrew Pattison	7	7
3	(United States) Charlie Pasarell (United States) Erik van Dillen	6	6
(South Africa) Pat Cramer (United States) Robert Kreiss	4	4
(United States) Jimmy Connors (United States) Spencer Segura	6	6
(United States) Jeff Borowiak (United States) Jim McManus	4	6
6	(United States) Arthur Ashe (United States) Roscoe Tanner	6	7
(United States) Dick Dell (United States) Sherwood Stewart	6	2	6
(United States) Paul Gerken (United States) Raz Reid	1	6	4
(Mexico) Joaquín Loyo-Mayo (Australia) Barry Phillips-Moore	3	4
2	(United States) Pancho Gonzales (United States) Tom Gorman	6	6

Second Round
(Rhodesia) Roger Dowdeswell (United States) Steve Krulevitz	0	6
8	(Australia) Ross Case (Australia) Geoff Masters	6	7
(Australia) John Alexander (Australia) Syd Ball	4	6	6
(South Africa) Ray Moore (Rhodesia) Andrew Pattison	6	4	7
(United States) Jimmy Connors (United States) Spencer Segura	4	4
6	(United States) Arthur Ashe (United States) Roscoe Tanner	6	6
(United States) Dick Dell (United States) Sherwood Stewart	6	6
2	(United States) Pancho Gonzales (United States) Tom Gorman	3	4

Quarterfinals
8	(Australia) Ross Case (Australia) Geoff Masters	7	6
(South Africa) Raymond Moore (Rhodesia) Andrew Pattison	5	3
6	(United States) Arthur Ashe (United States) Roscoe Tanner	3	6	7
(United States) Dick Dell (United States) Sherwood Stewart	6	3	5

Semifinals
8	(Australia) Ross Case (Australia) Geoff Masters	7	7
6	(United States) Arthur Ashe (United States) Roscoe Tanner	5	6
