= 1974 Volvo International =

- Date: August 5–9
- Edition: 2nd
- Category: Grand Prix (Group B)
- Draw: 32S / 16D
- Prize money: $50,000
- Surface: Clay / outdoor
- Location: Bretton Woods, New Hampshire; United States
- Venue: Mount Washington Resort

Champions

Singles
- (Australia) Rod Laver

Doubles
- (United States) Jeff Borowiak / (Australia) Rod Laver
- Volvo International

The 1974 Volvo International was a men's tennis tournament played on outdoor clay courts at the Mount Washington Resort in Bretton Woods, New Hampshire in the United States. The tournament was part of the 1974 Commercial Union Assurance Grand Prix and was classified in the Group B tier. It was the second edition of the tournament and was held from August 5 through August 9, 1974. First-seeded Rod Laver won the singles title.

== Finals ==
=== Singles ===
(Australia) Rod Laver defeated (United States) Harold Solomon 6–4, 6–3

- It was Laver's 6th singles title of the year and the 68th of his career in the Open Era.

=== Doubles ===
(United States) Jeff Borowiak / (Australia) Rod Laver defeated (France) Georges Goven / (France) François Jauffret 6–3, 6–2

- It was Borowiak's 3rd title of the year and the 4th of his career. It was Laver's 9th title of the year and the 60th of his professional career.
