= John Newcombe =

Australian tennis player (born 1944)

John Newcombe AO OBE
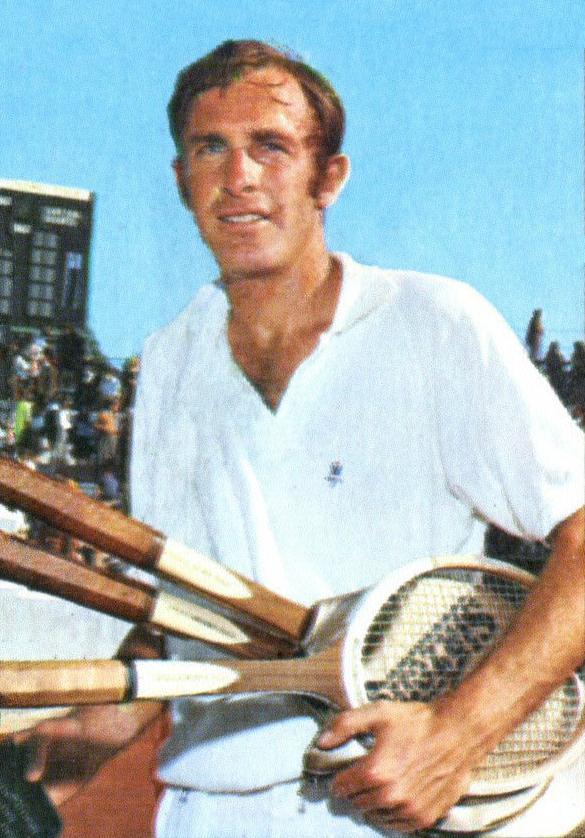
- Newcombe in 1968
- Full name: John David Newcombe
- Country (sports): Australia
- Residence: Sydney, Australia
- Born: 23 May 1944 (age 82) Sydney, Australia
- Height: 1.83 m (6 ft 0 in)
- Turned pro: 1967 (amateur from 1960)
- Retired: 1981
- Plays: Right-handed (one-handed backhand)
- Prize money: US$1,062,408
- Int. Tennis HoF: 1986 (member page)

Singles
- Career record: 1072–401 (72.8%)
- Career titles: 68 (41 Open Era titles listed by ATP)
- Highest ranking: No. 1 (1967, Lance Tingay); No. 1 (3 June 1974, ATP)

Grand Slam singles results
- Australian Open: W (1973, 1975)
- French Open: QF (1965, 1969)
- Wimbledon: W (1967, 1970, 1971)
- US Open: W (1967, 1973)

Other tournaments
- Tour Finals: SF (1973, 1974)
- WCT Finals: W (1974)
- Professional majors

Doubles
- Career record: 333–115 (74.3%)
- Career titles: 33
- Highest ranking: No. 1 (1965)

Grand Slam doubles results
- Australian Open: W (1965, 1967, 1971, 1973, 1976)
- French Open: W (1967, 1969, 1973)
- Wimbledon: W (1965, 1966, 1968, 1969, 1970, 1974)
- US Open: W (1967, 1971, 1973)

Grand Slam mixed doubles results
- Australian Open: W (1965)
- French Open: F (1965)
- US Open: W (1964)

Team competitions
- Davis Cup: W (1964, 1965, 1966, 1967, 1973)

John David Newcombe AO OBE (born 23 May 1944) is an Australian former professional tennis player. He was ranked as the world No. 1 in both men's singles and men's doubles. Newcombe won a combined 26 major titles: seven in singles, a former record 17 in men's doubles, and two in mixed doubles. He also contributed to five Davis Cup titles for Australia during an age when the Davis Cup was deemed as significant as the majors.

== Career ==
=== Amateur ===
Newcombe played several sports as a boy before devoting himself to tennis. Newcombe's powerful serve and volley was the backbone of his attacking game. He frequently came up with a second-serve ace. He was the Australian junior champion from 1961 to 1963 and was a member of Australia's Davis Cup winning team in 1964.

In singles, Newcombe entered the Australian Championships in January 1960 aged 15 years and 8 months and lost in the first round to Bob Mark. He was younger than three other 15 year old entrants: Vivian McGrath in 1932, Dinny Pails in 1937 and Lleyton Hewitt in 1997. Newcombe's first Grand Slam singles final was at the US championships in 1966 when he lost in four sets to Fred Stolle (both players were unseeded).

Newcombe's first Grand Slam singles title came at Wimbledon 1967, when he lost five games in beating Wilhelm Bungert in the final in straight sets. At the 1967 U.S. Championships, he beat Clark Graebner in straight sets in the final. Newcombe was the top ranked amateur in the world in 1967 according to Lance Tingay, World Tennis and an Ulrich Kaiser panel of 13 experts and was the first recipient of the Martini and Rossi award after finishing top of their points system in 1967.

=== Professional ===
In January 1968, Newcombe signed a three-year professional contract with Lamar Hunt's World Championship Tennis (WCT) and became part of the "Handsome Eight", the original eight WCT players. Newcombe was guaranteed $135,000 annually, which was higher than what the best paid baseball player received that year. The open era began in April 1968.

Although all his Grand Slam singles titles were won on grass, Newcombe showed his prowess on clay when he won the 1968 German Open, beating Cliff Drysdale in straight sets in the final and the 1969 Italian Open, beating Tony Roche in five sets in the final. In the 1969 Wimbledon final, Newcombe led 4–1 in the third set at one set all before Rod Laver won in four sets.

In the 1970 Wimbledon quarter finals, Newcombe outlasted Roy Emerson 11–9 in the fifth set in a "dour three-hour serve-and volley battle". In the final Newcombe beat Rosewall in five sets. "If Rosewall had the shots and the crowd behind him, Newcombe had the youth, the strength- and the service". He was ranked world number one in 1970 by Tingay, World Tennis, Bud Collins, Mike Gibson and Tennis magazine (Germany).

In the 1971 Wimbledon final, Newcombe beat Stan Smith in five sets. It "was a battle of power serves and volleys, with the Aussie's experience finally winning out". He was ranked world No. 1 in 1971 by Tingay, Rex Bellamy, Collins, Frank Rostron and World Tennis and he and Stan Smith were joint recipients of The 'Martini and Rossi' Award, voted for by 11 journalists. As a member of the WCT professional tour group and the Players' Union, Newcombe was banned by the International Tennis Federation from competing in the 1972 Wimbledon Championships and he joined the ATP boycott of the event in 1973.

Newcombe won his first Australian Open singles title in 1973 with a four set victory over Onny Parun in the final. In the quarter finals of the 1973 US Open Newcombe beat Jimmy Connors, not losing his serve in a straight sets win. In the semis he overcame Rosewall and in the final, Newcombe beat Jan Kodeš in five sets. "Newcombe's superior service power- he thundered down 15 aces against 6 by Kodes- got him the victory". In 1973 Newcombe was ranked world No. 1 by Tingay and Judith Elian.

Newcombe was the WCT champion for 1974, defeating Tom Okker, Stan Smith, and Björn Borg in the final. "Big John, puffing and snorting like an old bull, handled Borg's flashy, go-for-broke attack with sometimes casual confidence". In winning his last Grand Slam singles title in 1975, Newcombe won his quarter final against Geoff Masters 10-8 in the fifth set, then came from 5-2 down and 3 match points down in the fifth set to beat Roche in the semi finals and in the final beat Connors in four sets. His last Grand Slam singles final at the 1976 Australian Open was played during a severe windstorm that caused the match to be suspended for half an hour and Newcombe lost in four sets to Mark Edmondson.

Newcombe was the last of the Australians who dominated tennis in the 1950s, 60s and 70s.

=== Doubles ===
He won his first Grand Slam title in 1965 by taking the Australian Championships doubles title with fellow Australian Tony Roche. That same year, the duo won the Wimbledon doubles title. They teamed to win the Australian doubles championship three more times, Wimbledon another four times and the US Championships in 1967, the French Championships in 1967, and the French Open in 1969. They won 12 Grand Slam titles, which remained the all-time record for a men's doubles team until 2013, when it was surpassed by Bob and Mike Bryan.

=== Legacy ===
Newcombe was captain of the Australian Davis Cup team from 1995 until 2000, leading his team to victory in 1999, defeating France in the final.

In his 1979 autobiography, Jack Kramer, the long-time tennis promoter and great player himself, included Newcombe in his list of the 21 greatest players of all time. In 2018 tennis.com listed Newcombe as the 15th greatest player in the open era.

Newcombe was inducted into the Sport Australia Hall of Fame in 1985 and in 1986 his achievements were recognised with his induction into the International Tennis Hall of Fame.

== Grand Slam finals ==
=== Singles: 10 (7 titles, 3 runner-ups) ===
Result	Year	Championship	Surface	Opponent	Score
Loss	1966	U.S. Championships	Grass	(Australia) Fred Stolle	6–4, 10–12, 3–6, 4–6
Win	1967	Wimbledon	Grass	(West Germany) Wilhelm Bungert	6–2, 6–1, 6–1
Win	1967	U.S. Championships	Grass	(United States) Clark Graebner	6–4, 6–4, 8–6
↓ Open Era ↓
Loss	1969	Wimbledon	Grass	(Australia) Rod Laver	4–6, 7–5, 4–6, 4–6
Win	1970	Wimbledon	Grass	(Australia) Ken Rosewall	5–7, 6–3, 6–2, 3–6, 6–1
Win	1971	Wimbledon	Grass	(United States) Stan Smith	6–3, 5–7, 2–6, 6–4, 6–4
Win	1973	Australian Open	Grass	(New Zealand) Onny Parun	6–3, 6–7, 7–5, 6–1
Win	1973	US Open	Grass	(Czechoslovakia) Jan Kodeš	6–4, 1–6, 4–6, 6–2, 6–3
Win	1975	Australian Open	Grass	(United States) Jimmy Connors	7–5, 3–6, 6–4, 7–6
Loss	1976	Australian Open	Grass	(Australia) Mark Edmondson	7–6, 3–6, 6–7, 1–6

== Grand Slam performance timeline ==
=== Singles ===
Key
W	F	SF	QF	#R	RR	Q#	DNQ	A	NH

(W) winner; (F) finalist; (SF) semifinalist; (QF) quarterfinalist; (#R) rounds 4, 3, 2, 1; (RR) round-robin stage; (Q#) qualification round; (DNQ) did not qualify; (A) absent; (NH) not held; (SR) strike rate (events won / competed); (W–L) win–loss record.

Tournament	1960	1961	1962	1963	1964	1965	1966	1967	1968	1969	1970	1971	1972	1973	1974	1975	1976	1977		1978	SR	W–L	Win %
Australian Open	1R	A	QF	QF	QF	SF	SF	SF	A	QF	QF	3R	QF	W	QF	W	F	A	QF	A	2 / 16	46–14	76.7
French Open	A	3R	3R	2R	2R	QF	3R	4R	A	QF	A	A	A	1R	A	A	1R	A		A	0 / 10	16–10	61.5
Wimbledon	A	1R	2R	1R	1R	4R	3R	W	4R	F	W	W	A	A	QF	A	3R	A		4R	3 / 14	45–11	80.4
US Open	A	A	A	4R	3R	A	F	W	QF	SF	SF	1R	3R	W	SF	A	A	A		A	2 / 11	45–9	83.3
Win–loss	0–1	0–2	5–3	5–3	5–4	10–3	14–4	20–2	7–2	18–4	13–2	8–2	4–2	12–1	12–3	6–0	7–3	3–1		3–1	7 / 41	152–44	77.6

Source: World Tennis

== See also ==
- List of Grand Slam men's singles champions
- World number one male tennis player rankings
- Tennis male players statistics

== Bibliography ==
- Collins, Bud; Hollander, Zander (1997). Bud Collins' Tennis Encyclopedia (3rd ed.). Detroit: Visible Ink Press. ISBN 978-1578590001.

Achievements
Preceded by Ilie Năstase	world No. 1; 3 June 1974 – 28 July 1974	Succeeded by Jimmy Connors
