= 1975 Grand Prix (tennis) =

Professional tennis circuit

1975 Grand Prix circuit
Details
- Duration: 26 December 1974 – 16 December 1975
- Edition: 6th
- Tournaments: 44
- Categories: TC events (3); GPM events (1); AA events (15); A events (6); B events (19)

Achievements (singles)
- Most titles: (Spain) Manuel Orantes (6)
- Most finals: (Spain) Manuel Orantes (9)
- Prize money leader: (Argentina) Guillermo Vilas ($237,392)
- Points leader: (Argentina) Guillermo Vilas (850)

Awards
- Player of the year: (United States) Arthur Ashe
- Newcomer of the year: (United States) Vitas Gerulaitis

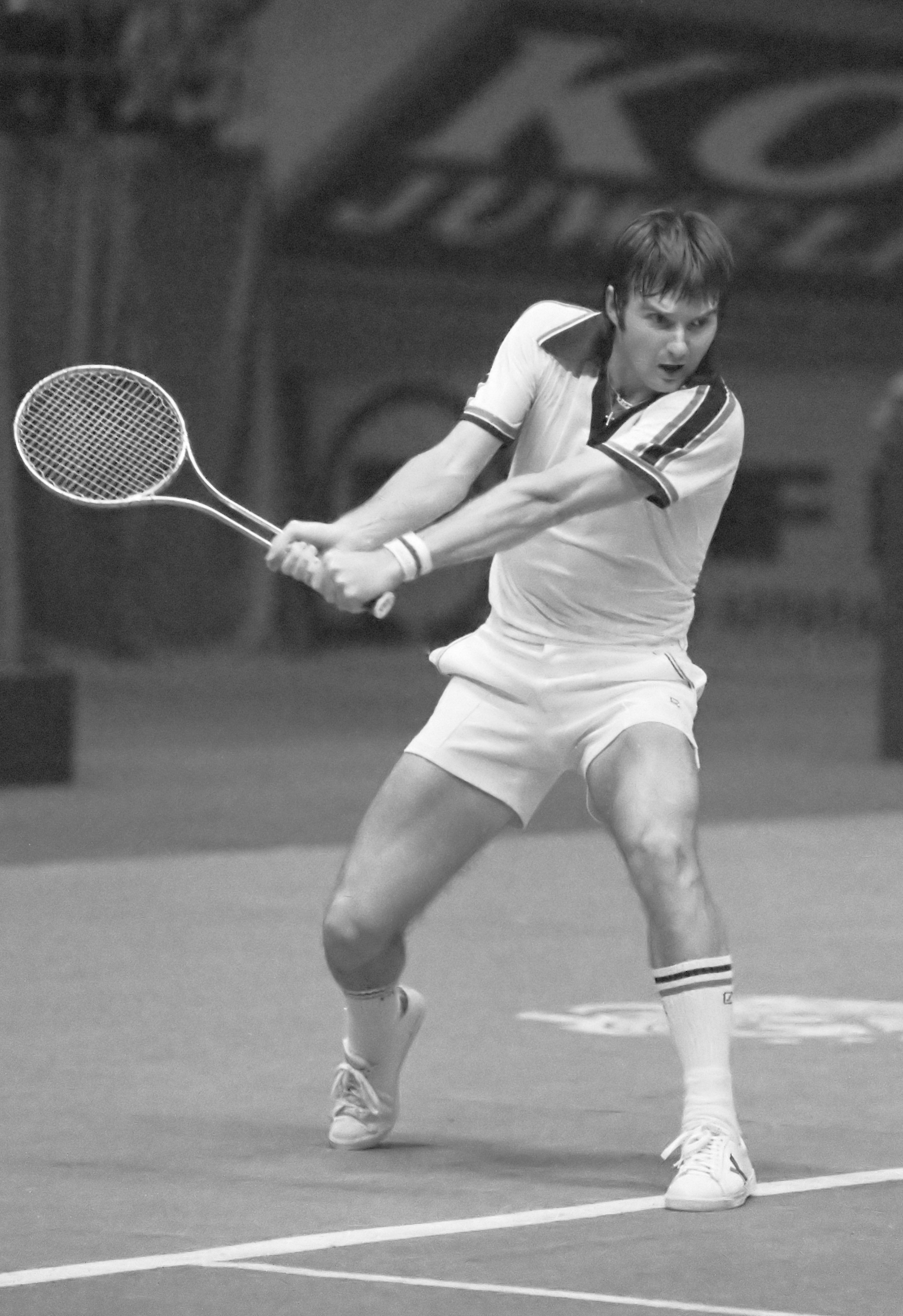
Jimmy Connors finished the year as ATP world No. 1 for the second time in his career. Connors won two tournaments during the season, and was runner-up at three majors at the Australian Open, the Wimbledon Championships and the US Open (though the Australian Open was a Group B event rather than a Triple Crown event like the other majors).

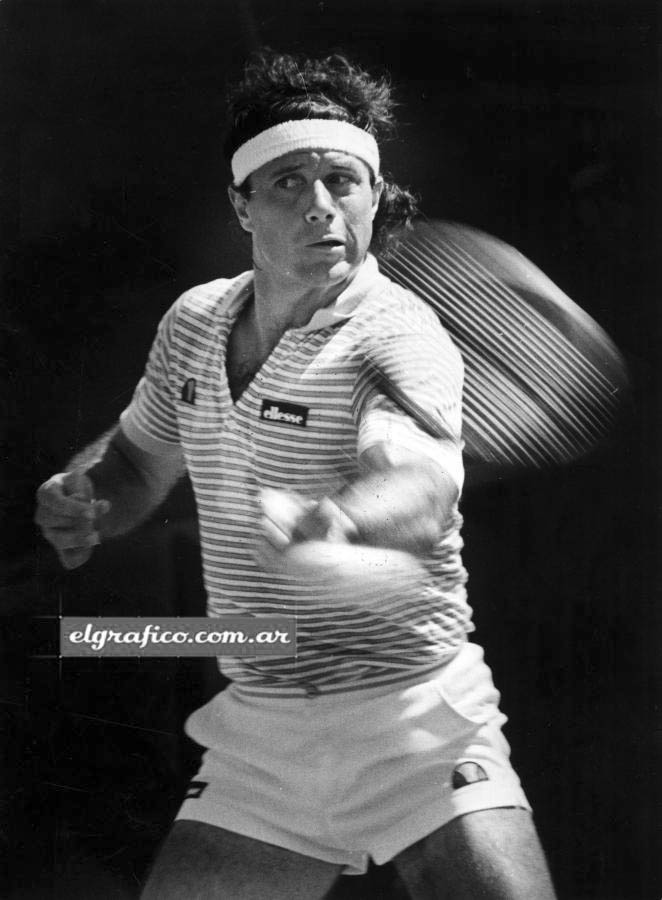
Guillermo Vilas was the 1975 Grand Prix No. 1. Vilas won five tournaments during the season, and was runner-up at a major at the French Open.

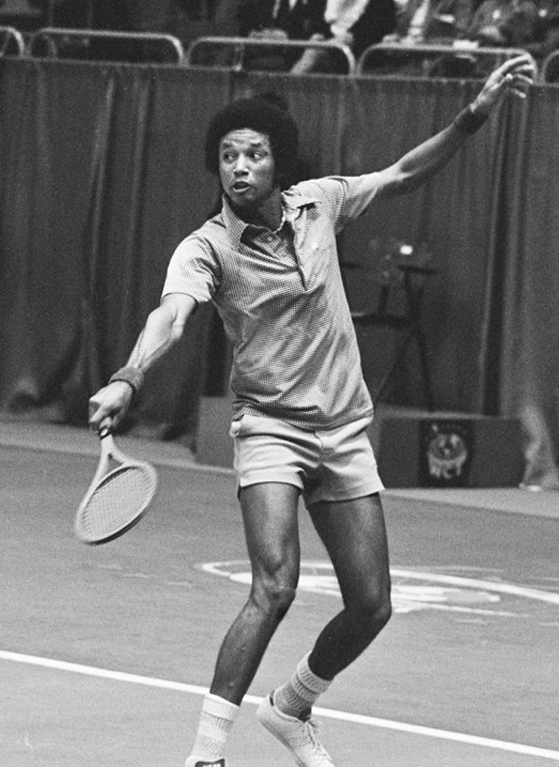
Arthur Ashe was named the ATP Player of the Year. Ashe won three tournaments during the season, including a major at the Wimbledon Championships.

The 1975 Commercial Union Assurance Grand Prix was a professional tennis circuit administered by the International Lawn Tennis Federation (ILTF) which served as a forerunner to the current Association of Tennis Professionals (ATP) World Tour and the Women's Tennis Association (WTA) Tour. The circuit consisted of the four modern Grand Slam tournaments and open tournaments recognised by the ILTF. The Commercial Union Assurance Masters, Davis Cup Final and Nations Cup are included in this calendar but did not count towards the Grand Prix.

The men's schedule started in December 1974 with the Australian Open and continued in May 1975 following the conclusion of the rival 1975 World Championship Tennis circuit which ran from January to early May.

== Schedule ==
Key

Triple Crown
Grand Prix Masters
Group AA events
Group A events
Group B events
Team events

=== December 1974 ===
Week	Tournament	Champions	Runners-up	Semifinalists	Quarterfinalists
26 Dec	Australian Open; Melbourne, Australia; Grand Slam; Group B Grass – $50,000 – 32S/32D; Singles – Doubles	(Australia) John Newcombe; 7–5, 3–6, 6–4, 7–6^{(9–7)}	(United States) Jimmy Connors	(Australia) Dick Crealy (Australia) Tony Roche	(Australia) Kim Warwick (Australia) John Alexander (Soviet Union) Alex Metreveli (Australia) Geoff Masters
26 Dec	Australian Open; Melbourne, Australia; Grand Slam; Group B Grass – $50,000 – 32S/32D; Singles – Doubles	(Australia) John Alexander (Australia) Phil Dent; 6–3, 7–6	(Australia) Bob Carmichael (Australia) Allan Stone	(Australia) Dick Crealy (Australia) Tony Roche	(Australia) Kim Warwick (Australia) John Alexander (Soviet Union) Alex Metreveli (Australia) Geoff Masters

=== May ===
Week	Tournament	Champions	Runners-up	Semifinalists	Quarterfinalists
5 May	Bavarian Championships; Munich, West Germany; Group B Clay – $50,000 – 32S/16D; Singles – Doubles	(Argentina) Guillermo Vilas; 2–6, 6–0, 6–2, 6–3	(West Germany) Karl Meiler	(West Germany) Ulrich Pinner (Romania) Ilie Năstase	(West Germany) Harald Elschenbroich (Czechoslovakia) Pavel Hutka (Czechoslovakia) Jan Kodeš (West Germany) Hans-Jürgen Pohmann
5 May	Bavarian Championships; Munich, West Germany; Group B Clay – $50,000 – 32S/16D; Singles – Doubles	(Poland) Wojciech Fibak (Czechoslovakia) Jan Kodeš; 7–5, 6–3	(Czechoslovakia) Milan Holeček (West Germany) Karl Meiler	(West Germany) Ulrich Pinner (Romania) Ilie Năstase	(West Germany) Harald Elschenbroich (Czechoslovakia) Pavel Hutka (Czechoslovakia) Jan Kodeš (West Germany) Hans-Jürgen Pohmann
12 May	Coca-Cola British Hard Court Championships; Bournemouth, Great Britain; Group B Clay – $50,000 – 48S/24D/16XD	(Spain) Manuel Orantes; 6–3, 4–6, 6–2, 7–5	(New Zealand) Onny Parun	(Argentina) Guillermo Vilas (France) Patrick Proisy	(South Africa) Bernard Mitton (United Kingdom) Roger Taylor (Czechoslovakia) Jan Kodeš (Romania) Ilie Năstase
12 May	Coca-Cola British Hard Court Championships; Bournemouth, Great Britain; Group B Clay – $50,000 – 48S/24D/16XD	(Spain) Juan Gisbert Sr. (Spain) Manuel Orantes; 8–6, 6–3	(Australia) Syd Ball (Australia) Dick Crealy	(Argentina) Guillermo Vilas (France) Patrick Proisy	(South Africa) Bernard Mitton (United Kingdom) Roger Taylor (Czechoslovakia) Jan Kodeš (Romania) Ilie Năstase
12 May	Coca-Cola British Hard Court Championships; Bournemouth, Great Britain; Group B Clay – $50,000 – 48S/24D/16XD	(United States) Sharon Walsh (United Kingdom) David Lloyd; 3–6, 8–6, 7–5	(United Kingdom) Lesley Charles (United Kingdom) Mark Farrell	(Argentina) Guillermo Vilas (France) Patrick Proisy	(South Africa) Bernard Mitton (United Kingdom) Roger Taylor (Czechoslovakia) Jan Kodeš (Romania) Ilie Năstase
19 May	German Open; Hamburg, West Germany; Group AA; Clay – $100,000 – 64S/32D	(Spain) Manuel Orantes; 3–6, 6–2, 6–2, 4–6, 6–1	(Czechoslovakia) Jan Kodeš	(Italy) Paolo Bertolucci (Romania) Ilie Năstase	(Argentina) Guillermo Vilas (Poland) Wojciech Fibak (New Zealand) Onny Parun (United Kingdom) Roger Taylor
19 May	German Open; Hamburg, West Germany; Group AA; Clay – $100,000 – 64S/32D	(Spain) Juan Gisbert Sr. (Spain) Manuel Orantes; 6–3, 7–6	(Poland) Wojciech Fibak (Czechoslovakia) Jan Kodeš	(Italy) Paolo Bertolucci (Romania) Ilie Năstase	(Argentina) Guillermo Vilas (Poland) Wojciech Fibak (New Zealand) Onny Parun (United Kingdom) Roger Taylor
26 May	Italian Open; Rome, Italy; Group AA; Clay – $100,000 – 64S/32D	(Mexico) Raúl Ramírez; 7–6, 7–5, 7–5	(Spain) Manuel Orantes	(Romania) Ilie Năstase (Argentina) Guillermo Vilas	(Sweden) Björn Borg (United States) Eddie Dibbs (United States) Harold Solomon (New Zealand) Onny Parun
26 May	Italian Open; Rome, Italy; Group AA; Clay – $100,000 – 64S/32D	(United States) Brian Gottfried (Mexico) Raúl Ramírez; 6–4, 7–6, 2–6, 6–1	(United States) Jimmy Connors (Romania) Ilie Năstase	(Romania) Ilie Năstase (Argentina) Guillermo Vilas	(Sweden) Björn Borg (United States) Eddie Dibbs (United States) Harold Solomon (New Zealand) Onny Parun
26 May	Agfacolor Cup; Düsseldorf, West Germany; Group B Clay – $50,000 – 32S/16D	(Chile) Jaime Fillol; 6–4, 1–6, 6–0, 7–5	(Czechoslovakia) Jan Kodeš	(Australia) Colin Dibley (France) François Jauffret	(South Africa) Raymond Moore (West Germany) Harald Elschenbroich (Austria) Hans Kary (Romania) Toma Ovici
26 May	Agfacolor Cup; Düsseldorf, West Germany; Group B Clay – $50,000 – 32S/16D	(France) François Jauffret (Czechoslovakia) Jan Kodeš; 6–2, 6–3	(West Germany) Harald Elschenbroich (Austria) Hans Kary	(Australia) Colin Dibley (France) François Jauffret	(South Africa) Raymond Moore (West Germany) Harald Elschenbroich (Austria) Hans Kary (Romania) Toma Ovici

=== June ===
Week	Tournament	Champions	Runners-up	Semifinalists	Quarterfinalists
3 Jun	French Open; Paris, France; Grand Slam; Triple Crown; Clay – 128S/64D/32XD; Singles – Doubles – Mixed doubles	(Sweden) Björn Borg; 6–2, 6–3, 6–4	(Argentina) Guillermo Vilas	(Italy) Adriano Panatta (United States) Eddie Dibbs	(United States) Harold Solomon (United States) John Andrews (New Zealand) Onny Parun (Mexico) Raúl Ramírez
3 Jun	French Open; Paris, France; Grand Slam; Triple Crown; Clay – 128S/64D/32XD; Singles – Doubles – Mixed doubles	(United States) Brian Gottfried (Mexico) Raúl Ramírez; 6–2, 2–6, 6–2, 6–4	(Australia) John Alexander (Australia) Phil Dent	(Italy) Adriano Panatta (United States) Eddie Dibbs	(United States) Harold Solomon (United States) John Andrews (New Zealand) Onny Parun (Mexico) Raúl Ramírez
3 Jun	French Open; Paris, France; Grand Slam; Triple Crown; Clay – 128S/64D/32XD; Singles – Doubles – Mixed doubles	(Uruguay) Fiorella Bonicelli (Brazil) Thomaz Koch; 6–4, 7–6	(United States) Pam Teeguarden (Chile) Jaime Fillol	(Italy) Adriano Panatta (United States) Eddie Dibbs	(United States) Harold Solomon (United States) John Andrews (New Zealand) Onny Parun (Mexico) Raúl Ramírez
17 Jun	John Player Open; Nottingham, Great Britain; Group AA; Grass – $100,000 – 64S/30D	(Netherlands) Tom Okker; 6–1, 3–6, 6–3	(Australia) Tony Roche	(United States) Roscoe Tanner (Australia) Phil Dent	(United States) Jimmy Connors (United States) Arthur Ashe (Australia) Bob Carmichael (Argentina) Guillermo Vilas
17 Jun	John Player Open; Nottingham, Great Britain; Group AA; Grass – $100,000 – 64S/30D	(United States) Charlie Pasarell (United States) Roscoe Tanner; 6–2, 6–3	(Netherlands) Tom Okker (United States) Marty Riessen	(United States) Roscoe Tanner (Australia) Phil Dent	(United States) Jimmy Connors (United States) Arthur Ashe (Australia) Bob Carmichael (Argentina) Guillermo Vilas
24 Jun	Wimbledon Championships; London, Great Britain; Grand Slam; Triple Crown; Grass – 128S/64D/64XD; Singles – Doubles – Mixed doubles	(United States) Arthur Ashe; 6–1, 6–1, 5–7, 6–4	(United States) Jimmy Connors	(United States) Roscoe Tanner (Australia) Tony Roche	(Mexico) Raúl Ramírez (Argentina) Guillermo Vilas (Sweden) Björn Borg (Netherlands) Tom Okker
24 Jun	Wimbledon Championships; London, Great Britain; Grand Slam; Triple Crown; Grass – 128S/64D/64XD; Singles – Doubles – Mixed doubles	(United States) Vitas Gerulaitis (United States) Sandy Mayer; 7–5, 8–6, 6–4	(Rhodesia) Colin Dowdeswell (Australia) Allan Stone	(United States) Roscoe Tanner (Australia) Tony Roche	(Mexico) Raúl Ramírez (Argentina) Guillermo Vilas (Sweden) Björn Borg (Netherlands) Tom Okker
24 Jun	Wimbledon Championships; London, Great Britain; Grand Slam; Triple Crown; Grass – 128S/64D/64XD; Singles – Doubles – Mixed doubles	(Australia) Margaret Court (United States) Marty Riessen; 6–4, 7–5	(Netherlands) Betty Stöve (Australia) Allan Stone	(United States) Roscoe Tanner (Australia) Tony Roche	(Mexico) Raúl Ramírez (Argentina) Guillermo Vilas (Sweden) Björn Borg (Netherlands) Tom Okker

=== July ===
Week	Tournament	Champions	Runners-up	Semifinalists	Quarterfinalists
7 Jul	Swedish Open; Båstad, Sweden; Group B Clay – $50,000 – 32S/16D	(Spain) Manuel Orantes; 6–0, 6–3	(Spain) José Higueras	(Brazil) Thomaz Koch (Italy) Corrado Barazzutti	(Sweden) Björn Borg (Spain) Juan Gisbert Sr. (Egypt) Ismail El Shafei (France) Patrick Proisy
7 Jul	Swedish Open; Båstad, Sweden; Group B Clay – $50,000 – 32S/16D	(Sweden) Ove Bengtson (Sweden) Björn Borg; 7–6, 7–5	(Spain) Juan Gisbert Sr. (Spain) Manuel Orantes	(Brazil) Thomaz Koch (Italy) Corrado Barazzutti	(Sweden) Björn Borg (Spain) Juan Gisbert Sr. (Egypt) Ismail El Shafei (France) Patrick Proisy
7 Jul	Swiss Open; Gstaad, Switzerland; Group B Clay – $50,000 – 32S/16D; Singles – Doubles	(Australia) Ken Rosewall; 6–4, 6–4, 6–3	(West Germany) Karl Meiler	(Colombia) Jairo Velasco (Argentina) Guillermo Vilas	(United States) Jeff Borowiak (Colombia) Iván Molina (Mexico) Marcelo Lara (Socialist Federal Republic of Yugoslavia) Nikola Pilić
7 Jul	Swiss Open; Gstaad, Switzerland; Group B Clay – $50,000 – 32S/16D; Singles – Doubles	(West Germany) Jürgen Fassbender (West Germany) Hans-Jürgen Pohmann; 6–4, 9–7, 6–1	(Rhodesia) Colin Dowdeswell (Australia) Ken Rosewall	(Colombia) Jairo Velasco (Argentina) Guillermo Vilas	(United States) Jeff Borowiak (Colombia) Iván Molina (Mexico) Marcelo Lara (Socialist Federal Republic of Yugoslavia) Nikola Pilić
7 Jul	Head Cup; Kitzbühel, Austria; Group B Clay – $50,000 – 32S/16D	(Italy) Adriano Panatta; 2–6, 6–2, 7–5, 6–4	(Czechoslovakia) Jan Kodeš	(West Germany) Ulrich Pinner (Poland) Wojciech Fibak	(Austria) Hans Kary (Hungary) János Benyik (Hungary) Balázs Taróczy (Czechoslovakia) Jiří Hřebec
7 Jul	Head Cup; Kitzbühel, Austria; Group B Clay – $50,000 – 32S/16D	(Italy) Paolo Bertolucci (Italy) Adriano Panatta; 6–2, 6–2, 7–6	(France) Patrice Dominguez (France) François Jauffret	(West Germany) Ulrich Pinner (Poland) Wojciech Fibak	(Austria) Hans Kary (Hungary) János Benyik (Hungary) Balázs Taróczy (Czechoslovakia) Jiří Hřebec
14 Jul	Chicago International; Chicago, United States; Group B Carpet – $50,000 – 32S/16D	(United States) Roscoe Tanner; 6–1, 6–7, 7–6	(Australia) John Alexander	(United States) Dick Stockton (Rhodesia) Andrew Pattison	(India) Sashi Menon (United States) Brian Gottfried (United States) Sherwood Stewart (Pakistan) Haroon Rahim
14 Jul	Chicago International; Chicago, United States; Group B Carpet – $50,000 – 32S/16D	(Australia) John Alexander (Australia) Phil Dent; 6–3, 6–4	(United States) Mike Cahill (United States) John Whitlinger	(United States) Dick Stockton (Rhodesia) Andrew Pattison	(India) Sashi Menon (United States) Brian Gottfried (United States) Sherwood Stewart (Pakistan) Haroon Rahim
14 Jul	Dutch Open; Hilversum, the Netherlands; Group B Clay – $50,000 – 32S/15D; Singles – Doubles	(Argentina) Guillermo Vilas; 6–4, 6–7, 6–2, 6–3	(Socialist Federal Republic of Yugoslavia) Željko Franulović	(Paraguay) Víctor Pecci (West Germany) Ulrich Pinner	(West Germany) Jürgen Fassbender (Egypt) Ismail El Shafei (Socialist Federal Republic of Yugoslavia) Nikola Špear (France) François Jauffret
14 Jul	Dutch Open; Hilversum, the Netherlands; Group B Clay – $50,000 – 32S/15D; Singles – Doubles	(Poland) Wojciech Fibak (Argentina) Guillermo Vilas; 6–4, 6–3	(Socialist Federal Republic of Yugoslavia) Željko Franulović (United Kingdom) John Lloyd	(Paraguay) Víctor Pecci (West Germany) Ulrich Pinner	(West Germany) Jürgen Fassbender (Egypt) Ismail El Shafei (Socialist Federal Republic of Yugoslavia) Nikola Špear (France) François Jauffret
21 Jul	Washington Star International; Washington, United States; Group AA; Clay – $100,000 – 64S/32D	(Argentina) Guillermo Vilas; 6–1, 6–3	(United States) Harold Solomon	(Mexico) Raúl Ramírez (United States) Cliff Richey	(Chile) Jaime Fillol (United States) Eddie Dibbs (Romania) Ilie Năstase (United States) Arthur Ashe
21 Jul	Washington Star International; Washington, United States; Group AA; Clay – $100,000 – 64S/32D	(United States) Bob Lutz (United States) Stan Smith; 7–5, 2–6, 6–1	(United States) Brian Gottfried (Mexico) Raúl Ramírez	(Mexico) Raúl Ramírez (United States) Cliff Richey	(Chile) Jaime Fillol (United States) Eddie Dibbs (Romania) Ilie Năstase (United States) Arthur Ashe
28 Jul	First National Bank Classic; Louisville, United States; Group AA; Clay – $100,000 – 64S/30D	(Argentina) Guillermo Vilas; 6–4, 6–3	(Romania) Ilie Năstase	(Chile) Jaime Fillol (United States) Arthur Ashe	(Socialist Federal Republic of Yugoslavia) Željko Franulović (Spain) Manuel Orantes (Mexico) Raúl Ramírez (Australia) John Alexander
28 Jul	First National Bank Classic; Louisville, United States; Group AA; Clay – $100,000 – 64S/30D	Not played.	(Poland) Fibak / (Argentina) Vilas (India) A. Amritraj / (India) V. Amritraj	(Chile) Jaime Fillol (United States) Arthur Ashe	(Socialist Federal Republic of Yugoslavia) Željko Franulović (Spain) Manuel Orantes (Mexico) Raúl Ramírez (Australia) John Alexander
28 Jul	Western Championships; Cincinnati, United States; Group B Clay – $50,000 – 32S/16D	(United States) Tom Gorman; 7–5, 2–6, 6–4	(United States) Sherwood Stewart	(South Africa) Byron Bertram (United States) Stan Smith	(United States) Brian Teacher (South Africa) Cliff Drysdale (Australia) Dick Crealy (United States) Robert Kreiss
28 Jul	Western Championships; Cincinnati, United States; Group B Clay – $50,000 – 32S/16D	(Australia) Phil Dent (South Africa) Cliff Drysdale; 7–6, 6–4	(Mexico) Marcelo Lara (Mexico) Joaquín Loyo-Mayo	(South Africa) Byron Bertram (United States) Stan Smith	(United States) Brian Teacher (South Africa) Cliff Drysdale (Australia) Dick Crealy (United States) Robert Kreiss

=== August ===
Week	Tournament	Champions	Runners-up	Semifinalists	Quarterfinalists
4 Aug	U.S. Clay Court Championships; Indianapolis, United States; Group AA; Clay – $130,000 – 64S/32D; Singles – Doubles	(Spain) Manuel Orantes; 6–2, 6–2	(United States) Arthur Ashe	(Argentina) Guillermo Vilas (New Zealand) Onny Parun	(United States) Eddie Dibbs (Spain) Juan Gisbert Sr. (Colombia) Iván Molina (Chile) Jaime Fillol
4 Aug	U.S. Clay Court Championships; Indianapolis, United States; Group AA; Clay – $130,000 – 64S/32D; Singles – Doubles	(Spain) Juan Gisbert Sr. (Spain) Manuel Orantes; 7–5, 6–0	(Poland) Wojciech Fibak (West Germany) Hans-Jürgen Pohmann	(Argentina) Guillermo Vilas (New Zealand) Onny Parun	(United States) Eddie Dibbs (Spain) Juan Gisbert Sr. (Colombia) Iván Molina (Chile) Jaime Fillol
4 Aug	Volvo International; North Conway, United States; Group B Clay – $100,000 – 48S/20D; Singles – Doubles	(United States) Jimmy Connors; 6–2, 6–2	(Australia) Ken Rosewall	(Australia) Rod Laver (Romania) Ilie Năstase	(Paraguay) Víctor Pecci (United States) Norman Holmes (South Africa) Raymond Moore (Australia) John Alexander
4 Aug	Volvo International; North Conway, United States; Group B Clay – $100,000 – 48S/20D; Singles – Doubles	(Pakistan) Haroon Rahim (United States) Erik van Dillen; 7–6, 7–6	(Australia) John Alexander (Australia) Phil Dent	(Australia) Rod Laver (Romania) Ilie Năstase	(Paraguay) Víctor Pecci (United States) Norman Holmes (South Africa) Raymond Moore (Australia) John Alexander
11 Aug	Rothmans Canadian Open; Toronto, Ontario, Canada; Group AA; Clay – $100,000 – 64S/32D	(Spain) Manuel Orantes; 7–6, 6–0, 6–1	(Romania) Ilie Năstase	(Australia) Phil Dent (Spain) Juan Gisbert Sr.	(Poland) Wojciech Fibak (Australia) John Alexander (Italy) Adriano Panatta (West Germany) Hans-Joachim Plötz
11 Aug	Rothmans Canadian Open; Toronto, Ontario, Canada; Group AA; Clay – $100,000 – 64S/32D	(South Africa) Cliff Drysdale (South Africa) Raymond Moore; 6–4, 5–7, 7–6	(Czechoslovakia) Jan Kodeš (Romania) Ilie Năstase	(Australia) Phil Dent (Spain) Juan Gisbert Sr.	(Poland) Wojciech Fibak (Australia) John Alexander (Italy) Adriano Panatta (West Germany) Hans-Joachim Plötz
11 Aug	City National Buckeye Championships; Columbus, United States; Group B $50,000 – Clay – 32S/16D	(India) Vijay Amritraj; 6–4, 7–5	(United States) Bob Lutz	(United States) Stan Smith (United States) Tom Gorman	(West Germany) Jürgen Fassbender (South Africa) Bernard Mitton (United States) Jim Delaney (United States) Sherwood Stewart
11 Aug	City National Buckeye Championships; Columbus, United States; Group B $50,000 – Clay – 32S/16D	(United States) Bob Lutz (United States) Stan Smith; 6–2, 6–7, 6–3	(West Germany) Jürgen Fassbender (West Germany) Hans-Jürgen Pohmann	(United States) Stan Smith (United States) Tom Gorman	(West Germany) Jürgen Fassbender (South Africa) Bernard Mitton (United States) Jim Delaney (United States) Sherwood Stewart
18 Aug	U.S. Professional Tennis Championships; Boston, United States; Group AA; Clay – $100,000 – 64S/32D; Singles – Doubles	(Sweden) Björn Borg; 6–3, 6–4, 6–2	(Argentina) Guillermo Vilas	(United States) Arthur Ashe (Australia) John Alexander	(Australia) Rod Laver (Poland) Wojciech Fibak (Spain) Manuel Orantes (Mexico) Raúl Ramírez
18 Aug	U.S. Professional Tennis Championships; Boston, United States; Group AA; Clay – $100,000 – 64S/32D; Singles – Doubles	(United States) Brian Gottfried (Mexico) Raúl Ramírez; 4–6, 6–3, 7–6	(United States) John Andrews (United States) Mike Estep	(United States) Arthur Ashe (Australia) John Alexander	(Australia) Rod Laver (Poland) Wojciech Fibak (Spain) Manuel Orantes (Mexico) Raúl Ramírez
18 Aug	Tennis Week Open; South Orange, United States; Group B Clay – $50,000 – 32S/12D	(Romania) Ilie Năstase; 7–6, 6–1	(South Africa) Bob Hewitt	(India) Vijay Amritraj (India) Anand Amritraj	(United States) Jimmy Connors (South Africa) Raymond Moore (United States) Victor Amaya (Hungary) Balázs Taróczy
18 Aug	Tennis Week Open; South Orange, United States; Group B Clay – $50,000 – 32S/12D	(United States) Jimmy Connors (Romania) Ilie Năstase; 6–2, 6–3	(Australia) Dick Crealy (United Kingdom) John Lloyd	(India) Vijay Amritraj (India) Anand Amritraj	(United States) Jimmy Connors (South Africa) Raymond Moore (United States) Victor Amaya (Hungary) Balázs Taróczy
25 Aug	US Open; New York City, United States; Grand Slam; Triple Crown; Clay – $166,810–128S/64D/32XD; Singles – Doubles – Mixed doubles	(Spain) Manuel Orantes; 6–4, 6–3, 6–3	(United States) Jimmy Connors	(Sweden) Björn Borg (Argentina) Guillermo Vilas	(Rhodesia) Andrew Pattison (United States) Eddie Dibbs (Romania) Ilie Năstase (Chile) Jaime Fillol
25 Aug	US Open; New York City, United States; Grand Slam; Triple Crown; Clay – $166,810–128S/64D/32XD; Singles – Doubles – Mixed doubles	(United States) Jimmy Connors (Romania) Ilie Năstase; 6–4, 7–6	(Netherlands) Tom Okker (United States) Marty Riessen	(Sweden) Björn Borg (Argentina) Guillermo Vilas	(Rhodesia) Andrew Pattison (United States) Eddie Dibbs (Romania) Ilie Năstase (Chile) Jaime Fillol
25 Aug	US Open; New York City, United States; Grand Slam; Triple Crown; Clay – $166,810–128S/64D/32XD; Singles – Doubles – Mixed doubles	(United States) Rosemary Casals (United States) Dick Stockton; 6–3, 7–6	(United States) Billie Jean King (Australia) Fred Stolle	(Sweden) Björn Borg (Argentina) Guillermo Vilas	(Rhodesia) Andrew Pattison (United States) Eddie Dibbs (Romania) Ilie Năstase (Chile) Jaime Fillol

=== September ===
Week	Tournament	Champions	Runners-up	Semifinalists	Quarterfinalists
15 Sep	Pacific Southwest Open; Los Angeles, United States; Group AA; Hard – $100,000 – 64S/32D; Singles – Doubles	(United States) Arthur Ashe; 3–6, 7–5, 6–3	(United States) Roscoe Tanner	(Mexico) Raúl Ramírez (United States) Harold Solomon	(United States) Bob Lutz (United States) Marty Riessen (United States) Dick Stockton (Australia) Allan Stone
15 Sep	Pacific Southwest Open; Los Angeles, United States; Group AA; Hard – $100,000 – 64S/32D; Singles – Doubles	(India) Anand Amritraj (India) Vijay Amritraj; 7–6^{(7–3)}, 4–6, 6–4	(South Africa) Cliff Drysdale (United States) Marty Riessen	(Mexico) Raúl Ramírez (United States) Harold Solomon	(United States) Bob Lutz (United States) Marty Riessen (United States) Dick Stockton (Australia) Allan Stone
22 Sep	Fireman's Fund International; San Francisco, United States; Group AA; Carpet (i) – $100,000 – 64S/32D; Singles – Doubles	(United States) Arthur Ashe; 6–0, 7–6^{(7–4)}	(Argentina) Guillermo Vilas	(United States) Jeff Borowiak (Australia) Geoff Masters	(United States) Bob Lutz (United States) Dick Stockton (South Africa) Cliff Drysdale (United States) Sandy Mayer
22 Sep	Fireman's Fund International; San Francisco, United States; Group AA; Carpet (i) – $100,000 – 64S/32D; Singles – Doubles	(United States) Fred McNair (United States) Sherwood Stewart; 6–2, 7–6^{(7–3)}	(Australia) Allan Stone (Australia) Kim Warwick	(United States) Jeff Borowiak (Australia) Geoff Masters	(United States) Bob Lutz (United States) Dick Stockton (South Africa) Cliff Drysdale (United States) Sandy Mayer
29 Sep	Hawaii Open; Maui, United States; Group B Hard – $50,000 – 32S/20D	(United States) Jimmy Connors; 6–1, 6–0	(United States) Sandy Mayer	(South Africa) Bernard Mitton (Pakistan) Haroon Rahim	(United States) Billy Martin (United States) Bob Lutz (United States) Jeff Borowiak (Australia) Allan Stone
29 Sep	Hawaii Open; Maui, United States; Group B Hard – $50,000 – 32S/20D	(United States) Fred McNair (United States) Sherwood Stewart; 3–6, 7–6, 6–3	(United States) Jeff Borowiak (Pakistan) Haroon Rahim	(South Africa) Bernard Mitton (Pakistan) Haroon Rahim	(United States) Billy Martin (United States) Bob Lutz (United States) Jeff Borowiak (Australia) Allan Stone
29 Sep	Nations Cup; Kingston, Jamaica $100,000 – 8 countries	United States; 2–1	United Kingdom	Chile; India	Mexico; West Germany; Australia; Commonwealth Caribbean

=== October ===
Week	Tournament	Champions	Runners-up	Semifinalists	Quarterfinalists
6 Oct	Trofeo Melia; Madrid, Spain; Group A Clay – $75,000 – 64S/32D	(Czechoslovakia) Jan Kodeš; 5–7, 2–6, 7–6, 6–2, 6–3	(Italy) Adriano Panatta	(Sweden) Björn Borg (Chile) Jaime Fillol	(Argentina) Guillermo Vilas (United States) Eddie Dibbs (Romania) Ilie Năstase (Spain) Manuel Orantes
6 Oct	Trofeo Melia; Madrid, Spain; Group A Clay – $75,000 – 64S/32D	(Czechoslovakia) Jan Kodeš (Romania) Ilie Năstase; 7–6, 4–6, 9–7	(Spain) Juan Gisbert Sr. (Spain) Manuel Orantes	(Sweden) Björn Borg (Chile) Jaime Fillol	(Argentina) Guillermo Vilas (United States) Eddie Dibbs (Romania) Ilie Năstase (Spain) Manuel Orantes
6 Oct	South Pacific Championships; Melbourne, Australia; Group B Clay – $50,000 – 32S/16D	(United States) Brian Gottfried; 6–2, 7–6, 6–1	(United States) Harold Solomon	(Australia) Phil Dent (United States) Cliff Richey	(Australia) Geoff Masters (United States) Nick Saviano (Australia) Ross Case (Australia) Dick Crealy
6 Oct	South Pacific Championships; Melbourne, Australia; Group B Clay – $50,000 – 32S/16D	(Australia) Ross Case (Australia) Geoff Masters; 6–4, 6–0	(United States) Brian Gottfried (Mexico) Raúl Ramírez	(Australia) Phil Dent (United States) Cliff Richey	(Australia) Geoff Masters (United States) Nick Saviano (Australia) Ross Case (Australia) Dick Crealy
13 Oct	Custom Credit Australian Indoor Championships; Sydney, Australia; Group AA; Hard (i) – $100,000 – 48S/24D	(United States) Stan Smith; 7–6, 6–2	(United States) Bob Lutz	(United States) Brian Gottfried (Australia) Ross Case	(United States) Sandy Mayer (Australia) John Alexander (United States) Tom Gorman (Australia) Geoff Masters
13 Oct	Custom Credit Australian Indoor Championships; Sydney, Australia; Group AA; Hard (i) – $100,000 – 48S/24D	(United States) Brian Gottfried (Mexico) Raúl Ramírez; 6–4, 6–2	(Australia) Ross Case (Australia) Geoff Masters	(United States) Brian Gottfried (Australia) Ross Case	(United States) Sandy Mayer (Australia) John Alexander (United States) Tom Gorman (Australia) Geoff Masters
13 Oct	Trofeo Conde de Godó; Barcelona, Spain; Group A Clay – $75,000 – 64S/32D; Singles – Doubles	(Sweden) Björn Borg; 1–6, 7–6, 6–3, 6–2	(Italy) Adriano Panatta	(Argentina) Guillermo Vilas (Chile) Jaime Fillol	(United States) Eddie Dibbs (Czechoslovakia) Jan Kodeš (Romania) Ilie Năstase (Spain) Manuel Orantes
13 Oct	Trofeo Conde de Godó; Barcelona, Spain; Group A Clay – $75,000 – 64S/32D; Singles – Doubles	(Sweden) Björn Borg (Argentina) Guillermo Vilas; 3–6, 6–4, 6–3	(Poland) Wojciech Fibak (West Germany) Karl Meiler	(Argentina) Guillermo Vilas (Chile) Jaime Fillol	(United States) Eddie Dibbs (Czechoslovakia) Jan Kodeš (Romania) Ilie Năstase (Spain) Manuel Orantes
20 Oct	Aryamehr Cup; Tehran, Iran; Group AA; Clay – $100,000 – 48S/24D	(United States) Eddie Dibbs; 1–6, 6–4, 7–5, 6–4	(Colombia) Iván Molina	(Argentina) Guillermo Vilas (France) Patrick Proisy	(Italy) Corrado Barazzutti (New Zealand) Onny Parun (Colombia) Jairo Velasco (Spain) Manuel Orantes
20 Oct	Aryamehr Cup; Tehran, Iran; Group AA; Clay – $100,000 – 48S/24D	(Spain) Juan Gisbert Sr. (Spain) Manuel Orantes; 7–5, 6–7, 6–1, 6–4	(South Africa) Bob Hewitt (South Africa) Frew McMillan	(Argentina) Guillermo Vilas (France) Patrick Proisy	(Italy) Corrado Barazzutti (New Zealand) Onny Parun (Colombia) Jairo Velasco (Spain) Manuel Orantes
20 Oct	Hitachi-Datsun Tennis Classic; Perth, Australia; Group B Hard – $50,000 – 32S/16D	(United States) Harold Solomon; 6–2, 7–6, 7–5	(United States) Sandy Mayer	(United States) Brian Gottfried (Australia) Ross Case	(United States) Cliff Richey (Australia) Tony Roche (Australia) Syd Ball (United States) Tom Gorman
20 Oct	Hitachi-Datsun Tennis Classic; Perth, Australia; Group B Hard – $50,000 – 32S/16D	(United States) Brian Gottfried (Mexico) Raúl Ramírez; 2–6, 6–4, 6–4, 6–0	(Australia) Ross Case (Australia) Geoff Masters	(United States) Brian Gottfried (Australia) Ross Case	(United States) Cliff Richey (Australia) Tony Roche (Australia) Syd Ball (United States) Tom Gorman
27 Oct	Philta International; Manila, the Philippines; Group A Hard – $75,000 – 32S/16D	(Australia) Ross Case; 6–3, 6–1	(Italy) Corrado Barazzutti	(Spain) José Higueras (Australia) Ken Rosewall	(Spain) Manuel Orantes (Australia) John Newcombe (Australia) Dick Crealy (West Germany) Hans-Jürgen Pohmann
27 Oct	Philta International; Manila, the Philippines; Group A Hard – $75,000 – 32S/16D	(Australia) Ross Case (Australia) Geoff Masters; 6–1, 6–2	(Australia) Syd Ball (Australia) Kim Warwick	(Spain) José Higueras (Australia) Ken Rosewall	(Spain) Manuel Orantes (Australia) John Newcombe (Australia) Dick Crealy (West Germany) Hans-Jürgen Pohmann
27 Oct	Jean Becker Open; Paris, France; Group B Hard (i) – $50,000 – 32S/18D; Singles – Doubles	(Netherlands) Tom Okker; 6–3, 2–6, 6–3, 3–6, 6–4	(United States) Arthur Ashe	(South Africa) Raymond Moore (Romania) Ilie Năstase	(United States) Roscoe Tanner (Chile) Jaime Fillol (United States) Eddie Dibbs (New Zealand) Onny Parun
27 Oct	Jean Becker Open; Paris, France; Group B Hard (i) – $50,000 – 32S/18D; Singles – Doubles	(Poland) Wojciech Fibak (West Germany) Karl Meiler; 6–4, 7–6	(Romania) Ilie Năstase (Netherlands) Tom Okker	(South Africa) Raymond Moore (Romania) Ilie Năstase	(United States) Roscoe Tanner (Chile) Jaime Fillol (United States) Eddie Dibbs (New Zealand) Onny Parun

=== November ===
Week	Tournament	Champions	Runners-up	Semifinalists	Quarterfinalists
2 Nov	Stockholm Open; Stockholm, Sweden; Group AA; Carpet – $100,000 – 64S/32D	(Italy) Adriano Panatta; 4-6, 6-3, 7-5	(United States) Jimmy Connors	(New Zealand) Onny Parun (Sweden) Björn Borg	(United States) Arthur Ashe (United States) Roscoe Tanner (Romania) Ilie Năstase (South Africa) Bernard Mitton
2 Nov	Stockholm Open; Stockholm, Sweden; Group AA; Carpet – $100,000 – 64S/32D	(South Africa) Bob Hewitt (South Africa) Frew McMillan; 3–6, 6–3, 6–4	(United States) Charlie Pasarell (United States) Roscoe Tanner	(New Zealand) Onny Parun (Sweden) Björn Borg	(United States) Arthur Ashe (United States) Roscoe Tanner (Romania) Ilie Năstase (South Africa) Bernard Mitton
2 Nov	Japan Open Tennis Championships; Tokyo, Japan; Group AA; Hard – $100,000 – 48S/24D	(Mexico) Raúl Ramírez; 6–4, 7–5, 6–3	(Spain) Manuel Orantes	(Australia) Tony Roche (Australia) Ken Rosewall	(United States) Harold Solomon (Australia) Dick Crealy (Australia) John Newcombe (West Germany) Hans-Jürgen Pohmann
2 Nov	Japan Open Tennis Championships; Tokyo, Japan; Group AA; Hard – $100,000 – 48S/24D	(United States) Brian Gottfried (Mexico) Raúl Ramírez; 7–6, 6–4	(Spain) Juan Gisbert Sr. (Spain) Manuel Orantes	(Australia) Tony Roche (Australia) Ken Rosewall	(United States) Harold Solomon (Australia) Dick Crealy (Australia) John Newcombe (West Germany) Hans-Jürgen Pohmann
9 Nov	Dewar Cup (Note: The tournament began at Meadowbanks in Edinburgh on 8 November and moved to the Royal Albert Hall in London on 12 November.); Edinburgh/London, Great Britain; Group A Carpet – 48S/23D	(United States) Eddie Dibbs; 1–6, 6–1, 7–5	(United States) Jimmy Connors	(United Kingdom) Buster Mottram (Romania) Ilie Năstase	(United States) Arthur Ashe (Czechoslovakia) Jan Kodeš (Pakistan) Haroon Rahim (South Africa) Bernard Mitton
9 Nov	Dewar Cup; Edinburgh/London, Great Britain; Group A Carpet – 48S/23D	(Poland) Wojciech Fibak (West Germany) Karl Meiler; 6–1, 7–5	(United States) Jimmy Connors (Romania) Ilie Năstase	(United Kingdom) Buster Mottram (Romania) Ilie Năstase	(United States) Arthur Ashe (Czechoslovakia) Jan Kodeš (Pakistan) Haroon Rahim (South Africa) Bernard Mitton
9 Nov	South American Championships; Buenos Aires, Argentina; Group A Clay – $50,000 – 32S/28D	(Argentina) Guillermo Vilas; 6–1, 6–4, 6–4	(Italy) Adriano Panatta	(Argentina) Ricardo Cano (Chile) Jaime Fillol	(Socialist Federal Republic of Yugoslavia) Željko Franulović (Colombia) Iván Molina (Paraguay) Víctor Pecci (Brazil) José Edison Mandarino
9 Nov	South American Championships; Buenos Aires, Argentina; Group A Clay – $50,000 – 32S/28D	(Italy) Paolo Bertolucci (Italy) Adriano Panatta; 7–6, 6–7, 6–4	(West Germany) Jürgen Fassbender (West Germany) Hans-Jürgen Pohmann	(Argentina) Ricardo Cano (Chile) Jaime Fillol	(Socialist Federal Republic of Yugoslavia) Željko Franulović (Colombia) Iván Molina (Paraguay) Víctor Pecci (Brazil) José Edison Mandarino
9 Nov	Citizen's Classic; Hong Kong, Hong Kong; Group B Hard – $50,000 – 32S/16D	(United States) Tom Gorman; 6–3, 6–1, 6–1	(United States) Sandy Mayer	(Mexico) Raúl Ramírez (United States) Brian Gottfried	(Spain) Juan Gisbert Sr. (Australia) Bob Carmichael (Australia) John Newcombe (Netherlands) Tom Okker
9 Nov	Citizen's Classic; Hong Kong, Hong Kong; Group B Hard – $50,000 – 32S/16D	(Netherlands) Tom Okker (Australia) Ken Rosewall; 6–3, 6–4	(Australia) Bob Carmichael (United States) Sandy Mayer	(Mexico) Raúl Ramírez (United States) Brian Gottfried	(Spain) Juan Gisbert Sr. (Australia) Bob Carmichael (Australia) John Newcombe (Netherlands) Tom Okker
16 Nov	South African Breweries Open; Johannesburg, South Africa; Group AA; Hard – $100,000 – 43S/24D/16XD	(United States) Harold Solomon; 6–3, 6–2, 5–7, 6–2	(United States) Brian Gottfried	(West Germany) Karl Meiler (New Zealand) Onny Parun	(South Africa) Pat Cramer (South Africa) Frew McMillan (South Africa) Raymond Moore (Rhodesia) Andrew Pattison
16 Nov	South African Breweries Open; Johannesburg, South Africa; Group AA; Hard – $100,000 – 43S/24D/16XD	(South Africa) Bob Hewitt (South Africa) Frew McMillan; 7–5, 6–4	(West Germany) Karl Meiler (United States) Charlie Pasarell	(West Germany) Karl Meiler (New Zealand) Onny Parun	(South Africa) Pat Cramer (South Africa) Frew McMillan (South Africa) Raymond Moore (Rhodesia) Andrew Pattison
16 Nov	South African Breweries Open; Johannesburg, South Africa; Group AA; Hard – $100,000 – 43S/24D/16XD	Title shared.	(South Africa) Kloss / (South Africa) Bertram (United States) Carnahan / (United States) Russell	(West Germany) Karl Meiler (New Zealand) Onny Parun	(South Africa) Pat Cramer (South Africa) Frew McMillan (South Africa) Raymond Moore (Rhodesia) Andrew Pattison
16 Nov	Indian Open; Calcutta, India; Group A $50,000 – Clay – 32S/16D	(India) Vijay Amritraj; 7–5, 6–3	(Spain) Manuel Orantes	(United States) Mike Cahill (Australia) Kim Warwick	(United States) Tom Gorman (United States) Sandy Mayer (Pakistan) Haroon Rahim (Spain) Juan Gisbert Sr.
16 Nov	Indian Open; Calcutta, India; Group A $50,000 – Clay – 32S/16D	(Spain) Juan Gisbert Sr. (Spain) Manuel Orantes; 1–6, 6–4, 6–3	(India) Anand Amritraj (India) Vijay Amritraj	(United States) Mike Cahill (Australia) Kim Warwick	(United States) Tom Gorman (United States) Sandy Mayer (Pakistan) Haroon Rahim (Spain) Juan Gisbert Sr.
30 Nov	Commercial Union Assurance Masters; Stockholm, Sweden; Grand Prix Masters; Carpet (i) – $130,000 – 8S/4D; Singles – Doubles	(Romania) Ilie Năstase; 6–2, 6–2, 6–1	(Sweden) Björn Borg	(Argentina) Guillermo Vilas (United States) Arthur Ashe	Round robin (Spain) Manuel Orantes (Italy) Adriano Panatta (United States) Harold Solomon (Mexico) Raúl Ramírez
30 Nov	Commercial Union Assurance Masters; Stockholm, Sweden; Grand Prix Masters; Carpet (i) – $130,000 – 8S/4D; Singles – Doubles	(Spain) Juan Gisbert Sr. (Spain) Manuel Orantes; 7–5, 6–1	(West Germany) Jürgen Fassbender (West Germany) Hans-Jürgen Pohmann	(Argentina) Guillermo Vilas (United States) Arthur Ashe	Round robin (Spain) Manuel Orantes (Italy) Adriano Panatta (United States) Harold Solomon (Mexico) Raúl Ramírez

=== December ===
Week	Tournament	Champions	Runners-up	Semifinalists	Quarterfinalists
14 Dec	Davis Cup Final; Stockholm, Sweden – carpet (i)	Sweden; 3–2	Czechoslovakia	Chile; Australia	Spain; France; South Africa; New Zealand

== Grand Prix points system ==
The tournaments listed above were divided into four groups. Group TC consisted of the Triple Crown – the French Open, the Wimbledon Championships and the US Open – while the other tournaments were divided into three other groups – AA, A and B – by prize money and draw size. Points were allocated based on these groups and the finishing position of a player in a tournament. No points were awarded to first round losers and ties were settled by the number of tournaments played. The points allocation – with doubles points listed in brackets – can be found below:

Group TC
- Champion: 120 (24)
- Runner-up: 90 (18)
- Semifinalist: 60 (12)
- Quarterfinalist: 30 (6)
- Fourth Round: 15 (3)
- Third Round: 7 (1)
- Second Round: 3

Group AA
- Champion: 80 (16)
- Runner-up: 60 (12)
- Semifinalist: 40 (8)
- Quarterfinalist: 20 (4)
- 9th – 16th: 10 (2)
- 17th – 32nd: 5

Group A
- Champion: 60 (12)
- Runner-up: 45 (9)
- Semifinalist: 30 (6)
- Quarterfinalist: 15 (3)
- 9th – 16th: 7 (1)
- 17th – 32nd: 3

Group B
- Champion: 40 (8)
- Runner-up: 30 (6)
- Semifinalist: 20 (4)
- 5th – 8th: 10 (2)
- 9th – 16th: 5

== Standings ==
Rk	Name	Points
1	Guillermo Vilas (ARG)	850
2	Manuel Orantes (ESP)	764
3	Björn Borg (SWE)	560
4	Arthur Ashe (USA)	550
5	Ilie Năstase (ROM)	485
6	Jimmy Connors (USA)	470
7	Raúl Ramírez (MEX)	402
8	Adriano Panatta (ITA)	393
9	Harold Solomon (USA)	375
10	Eddie Dibbs (USA)	370

== ATP rankings ==
These are the ATP rankings of the top twenty singles players at the end of the 1974 season and at the end of the 1975 season, with numbers of ranking points, points averages, numbers of tournaments played, year-end rankings in 1975, highest and lowest positions during the season and number of spots gained or lost from the first rankings to the year-end rankings.

As of 20 December 1974
Rk	Name
1	Jimmy Connors (USA)
2	John Newcombe (AUS)
3	Björn Borg (SWE)
4	Rod Laver (AUS)
5	Guillermo Vilas (ARG)
6	Tom Okker (NED)
7	Arthur Ashe (USA)
8	Stan Smith (USA)
9	Ken Rosewall (AUS)
10	Ilie Năstase (ROU)
11	Manuel Orantes (ESP)
12	Marty Riessen (USA)
13	Alex Metreveli (URS)
14	Roscoe Tanner (USA)
15	Dick Stockton (USA)
16	Harold Solomon (USA)
17	Jan Kodeš (TCH)
18	Cliff Drysdale (RSA)
19	Raúl Ramírez (MEX)
20	François Jauffret (FRA)

Year-end rankings 1975 (15 December 1975)
Rk	Name	Points	Average	High	Low	Change
1	Jimmy Connors (USA)	769	42.72			=
2	Guillermo Vilas (ARG)	893	42.52			▲ +3
3	Björn Borg (SWE)	728	38.32			=
4	Arthur Ashe (USA)	905	37.71			▲ +3
5	Manuel Orantes (ESP)	887	35.48			▲ +6
6	Ken Rosewall (AUS)	387	29.77			▲ +3
7	Ilie Năstase (ROU)	699	29.12			▲ +3
8	John Alexander (AUS)	587	24.46			▲ +18
9	Roscoe Tanner (USA)	569	23.71			▲ +5
10	Rod Laver (AUS)	351	23.40			▼ −6
11	Tom Okker (NED)	326	23.29			▼ −5
12	Tony Roche (AUS)	279	23.25			▲ +15
13	Raúl Ramírez (MEX)	620	22.14			▲ +6
14	Adriano Panatta (ITA)	485	20.21			▲ +24
15	Vitas Gerulaitis (USA)	286	19.07			▲ +30
16	Jaime Fillol (CHI)	469	18.04			▲ +15
17	Harold Solomon (USA)	582	17.64			▼ −1
18	Eddie Dibbs (USA)	450	17.31			▲ +4
19	Jan Kodeš (TCH)	342	16.29			▼ −2
20	John Newcombe (AUS)	187	15.58			▼ −18

== List of tournament winners ==
The list of winners and number of Grand Prix singles titles won, alphabetically by last number of titles:

- (Spain) Manuel Orantes (6) Bournemouth, Hamburg, Båstad, Indianapolis, Montreal, US Open
- (Argentina) Guillermo Vilas (5) Munich, Hilversum, Washington, D.C., Louisville, Buenos Aires
- (United States) Arthur Ashe (3) Wimbledon, Los Angeles, San Francisco
- (Sweden) Björn Borg (3) French Open, Boston, Barcelona
- (Romania) Ilie Năstase (3) Barcelona, South Orange, Masters
- (India) Vijay Amritraj (2) Columbus, Calcutta
- (Australia) Ross Case (2) Manila, Sydney Indoor
- (United States) Jimmy Connors (2) North Conway, Maui
- (United States) Tom Gorman (2) Cincinnati, Hong Kong
- (Netherlands) Tom Okker (2) Nottingham, Paris (Jean Becker)
- (Italy) Adriano Panatta (2) Kitzbühel, Stockholm
- (Mexico) Raúl Ramírez (2) Rome, Tokyo Outdoor
- (United States) Harold Solomon (2) Perth, Johannesburg
- (United States) Eddie Dibbs (1) Tehran
- (Chile) Jaime Fillol (1) Düsseldorf
- (United States) Brian Gottfried (1) Melbourne Indoor
- (Czechoslovakia) Jan Kodeš (1) Madrid
- (Australia) John Newcombe (1) Australian Open
- (Australia) Ken Rosewall (1) Gstaad
- (United States) Stan Smith (1) Sydney Indoor

No players won their first Grand Prix title in 1975.

== See also ==
- 1975 World Championship Tennis circuit
- 1975 USLTA-IPA Indoor Circuit
- 1975 WTA Tour
