= 1975 Suisse Open Gstaad – Doubles =

Doubles
- 1975 Suisse Open Gstaad

Final
- Champion: (West Germany) Jürgen Fassbender (West Germany) Hans-Jürgen Pohmann
- Runner-up: (Rhodesia) Colin Dowdeswell (Australia) Ken Rosewall
- Score: 6–4, 9–7, 6–1

Details
- Draw: 16

Events
| Singles | Doubles |
| ← 1974 · | Swiss Open | · 1976 → |

The 1975 Suisse Open Gstaad – Doubles was an event of the 1975 Suisse Open Gstaad tennis tournament and was played on outdoor red clay courts in Gstaad, Switzerland from 7 July until 13 July 1975. The draw consisted of 16 teams. José Higueras and Manuel Orantes were the defending Swiss Open doubles champions but did not compete in this edition. The German team of Jürgen Fassbender and Hans-Jürgen Pohmann won the title by defeating Colin Dowdeswell and singles winner Ken Rosewall in the final, 6–4, 9–7, 6–1.

== Draw ==
=== Key ===
- Q = Qualifier
- WC = Wild card
- LL = Lucky loser
- Alt = Alternate
- SE = Special exempt
- PR = Protected ranking
- ITF = ITF entry
- JE = Junior exempt
- w/o = Walkover
- r = Retired
- d = Defaulted
- SR = Special ranking

First Round
(West Germany) Jürgen Fassbender (West Germany) Hans-Jürgen Pohmann | 6 | 6
(Australia) Barry Phillips-Moore (Serbia) Nikola Špear | 3 | 3
(Argentina) Guillermo Vilas (Argentina) Tito Vázquez | 3 | 6 | 6
(Japan) Kenichi Hirai (Japan) Toshiro Sakai | 6 | 0 | 1
(Brazil) Carlos Kirmayr (Japan) Jun Kuki | 6 | 6
(United Kingdom) Gerald Battrick (United Kingdom) Graham Stilwell | 4 | 3
(United States) Jeff Borowiak (Socialist Federal Republic of Yugoslavia) Nikola Pilić | 4 | 6 | 6
(Argentina) Elio Lito Alvarez (Belgium) Bernard Mignot | 6 | 2 | 1
(Mexico) Marcello Lara (Mexico) Joaquín Loyo-Mayo | 6 | 6
(Switzerland) Petr Kanderal (Switzerland) Dimitri Sturdza | 1 | 4
(Australia) John Alexander (United Kingdom) Roger Taylor | 6 | 6
(West Germany) Karl Meiler (West Germany) Hans-Joachim Plötz | 2 | 3
(Colombia) Iván Molina (Colombia) Jairo Velasco Sr. | 6 | 6
(United States) Dick Dell (United States) Rick Fisher | 4 | 4
(United Kingdom) Colin Dowdeswell (Australia) Ken Rosewall | 6 | 6
(France) Jean-François Caujolle (Venezuela) Humphrey Hose | 0 | 1

Quarterfinals
(West Germany) Jürgen Fassbender (West Germany) Hans-Jürgen Pohmann | 6 | 8
(Argentina) Guillermo Vilas (Argentina) Tito Vázquez | 4 | 6
(Brazil) Carlos Kirmayr (Japan) Jun Kuki | 3 | 1
(United States) Jeff Borowiak (Socialist Federal Republic of Yugoslavia) Nikola Pilić | 6 | 6
(Mexico) Marcello Lara (Mexico) Joaquín Loyo-Mayo | 6 | 6 | 2
(Australia) John Alexander (United Kingdom) Roger Taylor | 4 | 8 | 6
(Colombia) Iván Molina (Colombia) Jairo Velasco Sr. | 2 | 3
(United Kingdom) Colin Dowdeswell (Australia) Ken Rosewall | 6 | 6

Semifinals
(West Germany) Jürgen Fassbender (West Germany) Hans-Jürgen Pohmann | 6 | 7
(United States) Jeff Borowiak (Socialist Federal Republic of Yugoslavia) Nikola Pilić | 2 | 5
(Australia) John Alexander (United Kingdom) Roger Taylor | 8 | 3 | 4
(United Kingdom) Colin Dowdeswell (Australia) Ken Rosewall | 6 | 6 | 6

Final
(West Germany) Jürgen Fassbender (West Germany) Hans-Jürgen Pohmann | 6 | 9 | 6
(United Kingdom) Colin Dowdeswell (Australia) Ken Rosewall | 4 | 7 | 1
