= 1975 Suisse Open Gstaad – Singles =

Singles
- 1975 Suisse Open Gstaad

Final
- Champion: (Australia) Ken Rosewall
- Runner-up: (West Germany) Karl Meiler
- Score: 6–4, 6–4, 6–3

Details
- Draw: 32
- Seeds: 2

Events
Singles	Doubles
← 1974 ·	Swiss Open	· 1976 →

The 1975 Suisse Open Gstaad – Singles was an event of the 1975 Suisse Open Gstaad tennis tournament and was played on outdoor red clay courts in Gstaad, Switzerland from 7 July until 13 July 1975. The draw comprised 32 players and two of them were seeded. Guillermo Vilas was the defending Swiss Open singles champion but lost in the semifinals. First-seeded Ken Rosewall won the title by defeating unseeded Karl Meiler in the final, 6–4, 6–4, 6–3.

== Seeds ==
1. (Australia) Ken Rosewall (champion)
2. (Argentina) Guillermo Vilas (semifinals)

== Draw ==
=== Key ===
- Q = Qualifier
- WC = Wild card
- LL = Lucky loser
- Alt = Alternate
- SE = Special exempt
- PR = Protected ranking
- ITF = ITF entry
- JE = Junior exempt
- w/o = Walkover
- r = Retired
- d = Defaulted
- SR = Special ranking

=== Finals ===
Semifinals
1	(Australia) Ken Rosewall	9	6	6
(Colombia) Jairo Velasco Sr.	7	0	2
(West Germany) Karl Meiler	6	6	4	6
2	(Argentina) Guillermo Vilas	3	4	6	4

Final
1	(Australia) Ken Rosewall	6	6	6
(West Germany) Karl Meiler	4	4	3

=== Top half ===
First Round
1	(Australia) Ken Rosewall	6	6
(Belgium) Bernard Mignot	3	4
(Serbia) Nikola Špear	4	4
(Brazil) Carlos Kirmayr	6	6
(United States) Jeff Borowiak	8	6
(West Germany) Hans-Joachim Plötz	6	3
(Australia) Barry Phillips-Moore	1	2
(United Kingdom) Colin Dowdeswell	6	6
(Australia) John Alexander	9	1	6
(United States) Dick Dell	7	6	1
(Colombia) Jairo Velasco Sr.	6	6
(Switzerland) Dimitri Sturdza	4	1
(West Germany) Hans-Jürgen Pohmann	4	6	5
(United Kingdom) Gerald Battrick	6	1	7
(Colombia) Iván Molina	7	6
(Japan) Toshiro Sakai	5	1

Second Round
1	(Australia) Ken Rosewall	6	6
(Brazil) Carlos Kirmayr	3	3
(United States) Jeff Borowiak	4	6	10
(United Kingdom) Colin Dowdeswell	6	3	8
(Australia) John Alexander	6	6	1
(Colombia) Jairo Velasco Sr.	0	8	6
(United Kingdom) Gerald Battrick	1	1
(Colombia) Iván Molina	6	6

Quarterfinals
1	(Australia) Ken Rosewall	7	6
(United States) Jeff Borowiak	5	4
(Colombia) Jairo Velasco Sr.	6	6
(Colombia) Iván Molina	0	1

Semifinals
1	(Australia) Ken Rosewall	9	6	6
(Colombia) Jairo Velasco Sr.	7	0	2

=== Bottom half ===
First Round
(Venezuela) Humphrey Hose	1	2
(France) Jean-François Caujolle	6	6
(Argentina) Tito Vázquez	4	3
(West Germany) Karl Meiler	6	6
(United Kingdom) Graham Stilwell	3	6	6
(Mexico) Marcello Lara	6	4	8
(Argentina) Elio Lito Alvarez	6	6	8
(United Kingdom) Roger Taylor	8	2	10
(United States) Rick Fisher	4	2
(Socialist Federal Republic of Yugoslavia) Nikola Pilić	6	6
(Mexico) Joaquín Loyo-Mayo	2	1
(West Germany) Jürgen Fassbender	6	6
(Switzerland) Petr Kanderal	6	5	1
(Japan) Jun Kuki	3	7	6
(Japan) Kenichi Hirai	2	4
2	(Argentina) Guillermo Vilas	6	6

Second Round
(France) Jean-François Caujolle	5	3
(West Germany) Karl Meiler	7	6
(Mexico) Marcello Lara	8	2	6
(United Kingdom) Roger Taylor	6	6	0
(Socialist Federal Republic of Yugoslavia) Nikola Pilić	1	6	6
(West Germany) Jürgen Fassbender	6	3	4
(Japan) Jun Kuki	5	0
2	(Argentina) Guillermo Vilas	7	6

Quarterfinals
(West Germany) Karl Meiler	4	6	10
(Mexico) Marcello Lara	6	0	8
(Socialist Federal Republic of Yugoslavia) Nikola Pilić	2	9	5
2	(Argentina) Guillermo Vilas	6	8	7

Semifinals
(West Germany) Karl Meiler	6	6	4
2	(Argentina) Guillermo Vilas	3	4	6
