= 1975 Pacific Coast Open =

- Date: September 22–28
- Edition: 87th
- Category: Grand Prix (Grade AA)
- Draw: 64S / 32D
- Prize money: $100,000
- Surface: Hard / indoor
- Location: San Francisco, California, United States
- Venue: Cow Palace

Champions

Singles
- (United States) Arthur Ashe

Doubles
- (United States) Fred McNair / (United States) Sherwood Stewart
- Pacific Coast Championships

The 1975 Pacific Coast Open, also known by its sponsored name Fireman's Fund International, was a men's tennis tournament played on indoor hard courts (Supreme Court) at the Cow Palace in San Francisco, California in the United States. The event was part of the Grade AA category of the 1975 Grand Prix circuit. It was the 87th edition of the tournament and ran from September 22 through September 28, 1975. Arthur Ashe won the singles title and $16,000 first prize money. The total attendance for the tournament was 55,000.

== Finals ==
=== Singles ===
(United States) Arthur Ashe defeated (Argentina) Guillermo Vilas 6–0, 7–6^{(7–4)}

=== Doubles ===
(United States) Fred McNair / (United States) Sherwood Stewart defeated (Australia) Allan Stone / (Australia) Kim Warwick 6–2, 7–6^{(7–3)}
