= 1975 Citizen's Classic =

Tennis tournament

- Date: 10–16 November
- Edition: 3rd
- Category: Grand Prix (Grade B)
- Draw: 32S / 16D
- Prize money: $50,000
- Surface: Hard / outdoor
- Location: Hong Kong

Champions

Singles
- (United States) Tom Gorman

Doubles
- (Netherlands) Tom Okker / (Australia) Ken Rosewall
- Hong Kong Open

The 1975 Citizen's Classic, also known as the Hong Kong Open, was a men's tennis tournament played on outdoor hard courts in Hong Kong. It was the third edition of the event and was held from 10 November through 16 November 1975. The tournament was part of the Grade B tier of the 1975 Grand Prix tennis circuit. Unseeded Tom Gorman won the singles title.

== Finals ==
=== Singles ===
(United States) Tom Gorman defeated (United States) Sandy Mayer 6–3, 6–1, 6–1

- It was Gorman's 2nd singles title of the year and the 5th of his career.

=== Doubles ===
(Netherlands) Tom Okker / (Australia) Ken Rosewall defeated (Australia) Bob Carmichael / (United States) Sandy Mayer 6–3, 6–4
