= 1975 Hitachi-Datsun Tennis Classic =

- Date: 20–26 October
- Edition: 1st
- Category: Grand Prix (Group B)
- Draw: 32S / 16D
- Prize money: $50,000
- Surface: Carpet / indoor
- Location: Perth, Western Australia, Australia
- Venue: Perth Entertainment Centre

Champions

Singles
- (United States) Harold Solomon

Doubles
- (United States) Brian Gottfried / (Mexico) Raúl Ramírez
- Perth Indoor Tennis Classic

The 1975 Hitachi-Datsun Tennis Classic, also known as the West Coast Classic, was an Association of Tennis Professionals men's tournament played on indoor carpet courts at the Perth Entertainment Centre in Perth, Western Australia, Australia that was part of Group B category of the 1975 Grand Prix tennis circuit. It was the inaugural edition of the tournament and was held from 20 October until 26 October 1975. Fifth-seeded Harold Solomon won the singles title.

== Finals ==
=== Singles ===
(United States) Harold Solomon defeated (United States) Sandy Mayer 6–2, 7–6, 7–5

- It was Solomon's 3rd singles title of the year and the 4th of his career.

=== Doubles ===
(United States) Brian Gottfried / (Mexico) Raúl Ramírez defeated (Australia) Ross Case / (Australia) Geoff Masters 2–6, 6–4, 6–4, 6–0
