= 1974 Suisse Open Gstaad =

- Date: 8–14 July
- Edition: 29th
- Category: Grand Prix (B)
- Draw: 32S / 16D
- Prize money: $50,000
- Surface: Clay / outdoor
- Location: Gstaad, Switzerland

Champions

Singles
- (Argentina) Guillermo Vilas

Doubles
- (Spain) José Higueras / (Spain) Manuel Orantes
- Swiss Open

The 1974 Suisse Open Gstaad was a men's tennis tournament played on outdoor clay courts in Gstaad, Switzerland. It was the 29th edition of the tournament and was held from 8 July through 14 July 1974. The tournament was part of the Grand Prix tennis circuit and categorized in Group B. Guillermo Vilas won the singles title and the accompanying $8,000 prize money.

== Finals ==
=== Singles ===
(Argentina) Guillermo Vilas defeated (Spain) Manuel Orantes 6–1, 6–2

- It was Vilas' first singles title of the year and the second of his career.

=== Doubles ===
(Spain) José Higueras / (Spain) Manuel Orantes defeated (Australia) Roy Emerson / (Brazil) Thomaz Koch 7–5, 0–6, 6–1, 9–8
