= 1975 Volvo International – Singles =

Singles
- 1975 Volvo International

Final
- Champion: (United States) Jimmy Connors
- Runner-up: (Australia) Ken Rosewall
- Score: 6–2, 6–2

Details
- Draw: 48
- Seeds: 4

Events
Singles	Doubles
← 1974 ·	Volvo International	· 1976 →

The 1975 Volvo International – Singles was an event of the 1975 Volvo International tennis tournament and was played on outdoor clay courts in North Conway, New Hampshire, in the United States, between August 4, and August 10, 1975. The draw comprised 48 players and 4 of them were seeded. Rod Laver was the defending South Pacific Tennis Classic singles champion but lost in the semifinals to Jimmy Connors. First-seeded Jimmy Connors won the singles title after a victory in the final against second-seeded Ken Rosewall, 6–2, 6–2.

== Seeds ==
All four seeds received a bye to the second round.

1. (United States) Jimmy Connors (champion)
2. (Australia) Ken Rosewall (final)
3. (Romania) Ilie Năstase (semifinals)
4. (Australia) Rod Laver (semifinals)

== Draw ==
=== Key ===
- Q = Qualifier
- WC = Wild card
- LL = Lucky loser
- Alt = Alternate
- ITF = ITF entry
- PR = Protected ranking
- SR = Special ranking
- SE = Special exempt
- JE = Junior exempt
- JR = Junior Accelerator Programme entrant
- CO = College Accelerator Programme entrant
- NG = Next Gen Accelerator Program entrant
- w/o = Walkover
- r = Retired
- d = Defaulted

=== Finals ===
Semifinals
1	(United States) Jimmy Connors	6	6
4	(Australia) Rod Laver	4	4
3	(Romania) Ilie Năstase	5	6	6
2	(Australia) Ken Rosewall	7	1	7

Final
1	(United States) Jimmy Connors	6	6
2	(Australia) Ken Rosewall	2	2

=== Top half ===
==== Section 1 ====
First round
(Australia) J James	6	6
(United States) B Bishop	3	3
(Australia) J Bartlett	6	7
(United States) R Fisher	4	6
(Paraguay) V Pecci	6	6
(United States) F Taygan	3	4
(United States) W Blocher	7	6	6
(Venezuela) H Hose	6	7	0

Second round
1	(United States) J Connors	7	6
(Australia) J James	5	3
(Australia) J Bartlett	4	0
(Socialist Federal Republic of Yugoslavia) N Špear	6	6
(Australia) P Dent	4	3
(Paraguay) V Pecci	6	6
(United States) W Blocher	4	2
(Australia) D Crealy	6	6

Third round
1	(United States) J Connors	6	6
(Socialist Federal Republic of Yugoslavia) N Špear	1	4
(Paraguay) V Pecci	6	7
(Australia) D Crealy	4	6

Quarterfinals
1	(United States) J Connors	7	2	6
(Paraguay) V Pecci	6	6	4

==== Section 2 ====
First round
(Czechoslovakia) F Pala
(West Germany) F Gebert	d
(United States) A Neely	6	2	3
(United Kingdom) G Battrick	2	6	6
(United States) L Turville	4	2
(United Kingdom) J Lloyd	6	6
(Sweden) T Svensson	2	6	1
(United States) N Holmes	6	3	6

Second round
4	(Australia) R Laver
(Czechoslovakia) F Pala	d
(United Kingdom) G Battrick	6	6
(Pakistan) H Rahim	4	4
(United States) J Borowiak	5	6	3
(United Kingdom) J Lloyd	7	0	6
(United States) N Holmes	6	7
(United States) G Hardie	1	5

Third round
4	(Australia) R Laver	2	6	6
(United Kingdom) G Battrick	6	3	2
(United Kingdom) J Lloyd	6	2
(United States) N Holmes	7	6

Quarterfinals
4	(Australia) R Laver	6	6
(United States) N Holmes	0	2

=== Bottom half ===
==== Section 3 ====
First round
(Australia) C Dibley	6	6	6
(United Kingdom) M Farrell	7	4	3
(West Germany) H-J Plötz	6	4	6
(Brazil) J Rasgado	2	6	4
(Rhodesia) C Dowdeswell	6	6
(Argentina) L Álvarez	3	4
(United Kingdom) G Stilwell	6	6
(United States) F Salazar	0	0

Second round
(South Africa) R Moore	6	6
(Australia) C Dibley	4	3
(West Germany) H-J Plötz	6	6
(United States) H Solomon	3	2
(France) P Proisy	d
(Rhodesia) C Dowdeswell
(United Kingdom) G Stilwell	3	2
3	(Romania) I Năstase	6	6

Third round
(South Africa) R Moore	6	7
(West Germany) H-J Plötz	3	6
(Rhodesia) C Dowdeswell	5	6	2
3	(Romania) I Năstase	7	3	6

Quarterfinals
(South Africa) R Moore	3	4
3	(Romania) I Năstase	6	6

==== Section 4 ====
First round
(United States) W Brown
(United States) B Walts	d
(United States) E van Dillen	6	6
(United Kingdom) J Feaver	2	4
(Venezuela) J Andrew	6	2	5
(South Africa) J Yuill	3	6	7
(United States) J Bouquin	4	1
(United Kingdom) M Robinson	6	6

Second round
(Sweden) K Johansson	6	6
(United States) W Brown	1	2
(United States) E van Dillen	1	4
(Australia) J Alexander	6	6
(Australia) B Phillips-Moore	6	6
(South Africa) J Yuill	2	4
(United Kingdom) M Robinson	4	3
2	(Australia) K Rosewall	6	6

Third round
(Sweden) K Johansson	0	6
(Australia) J Alexander	6	7
(Australia) B Phillips-Moore	4	2
2	(Australia) K Rosewall	6	6

Quarterfinals
(Australia) J Alexander	0	3
2	(Australia) K Rosewall	6	6
