= 1975 Volvo International =

- Date: August 4–10
- Edition: 3rd
- Category: Grand Prix (B grade)
- Draw: 64S / 32D
- Prize money: $100,000
- Surface: Clay / outdoor
- Location: North Conway, New Hampshire, US

Champions

Singles
- (United States) Jimmy Connors

Doubles
- (Pakistan) Haroon Rahim / (United States) Erik van Dillen
- Volvo International

The 1975 Volvo International was a men's tennis tournament played on outdoor clay courts in North Conway, New Hampshire, in the United States and was part of the 1975 Commercial Union Assurance Grand Prix. It was the third edition of the tournament and was held from August 4 though August 10, 1975. First-seeded Jimmy Connors won the singles title.

== Finals ==
=== Singles ===
(United States) Jimmy Connors defeated (Australia) Ken Rosewall 6–2, 6–2

- It was Connors' 7th singles title of the year and the 39th of his career.

=== Doubles ===
(Pakistan) Haroon Rahim / (United States) Erik van Dillen defeated (Australia) John Alexander / (Australia) Phil Dent 6–3, 1–6, 7–5

- It was Rahim's only title of the year and the 2nd of his career. It was Van Dillen's 3rd title of the year and the 8th of his career.
