= 1975 Swedish Open =

- Date: 7–13 July
- Edition: 28th
- Category: Grand Prix (Group B)
- Draw: 32S/16D
- Surface: Clay / outdoor
- Location: Båstad, Sweden

Champions

Men's singles
- (Spain) Manuel Orantes

Women's singles
- (United Kingdom) Sue Barker

Men's doubles
- (Sweden) Ove Nils Bengtson / (Sweden) Björn Borg

Women's doubles
- (United States) Janet Newberry / (United States) Pam Teeguarden
- Swedish Open

The 1975 Swedish Open was a combined men's and women's tennis tournament played on outdoor clay courts held in Båstad, Sweden. It was classified as a Group B category tournament and was part of the 1975 Grand Prix circuit. It was the 28th edition of the tournament and was held from 7 July until 7 July 1975. Manuel Orantes and Sue Barker won the singles titles.

== Finals ==
=== Men's singles ===
(Spain) Manuel Orantes defeated (Spain) José Higueras 6–0, 6–3

=== Women's singles ===
(United Kingdom) Sue Barker defeated (West Germany) Helga Masthoff 6–4, 6–0

=== Men's doubles ===
(Sweden) Ove Nils Bengtson / (Sweden) Björn Borg defeated (Spain) Juan Gisbert / (Spain) Manuel Orantes 7–6, 7–5

=== Women's doubles ===
(United States) Janet Newberry / (United States) Pam Teeguarden defeated (Uruguay) Fiorella Bonicelli / (Argentina) Raquel Giscafré 6–3, 6–3
