= 1975 Volvo International – Doubles =

Doubles
- 1975 Volvo International

Final
- Champion: (Pakistan) Haroon Rahim (United States) Erik van Dillen
- Runner-up: (Australia) John Alexander (Australia) Phil Dent
- Score: 6–3, 1–6, 7–5

Details
- Draw: 20

Events
Singles	Doubles
- Volvo International

The 1975 Volvo International – Doubles was an event of the 1975 Volvo International tennis tournament and was played on outdoor clay courts in North Conway, New Hampshire, in the United States, between August 4, and August 10, 1975. The draw comprised 20 teams. Jeff Borowiak and Rod Laver were the defending South Pacific Tennis Classic doubles champions but did not participate in this edition. The team of Haroon Rahim and Erik van Dillen won the doubles title by defeating John Alexander and Phil Dent in the final, 6–3, 1–6, 7–5.

== Draw ==
Key

- Q = Qualifier
- WC = Wild card
- LL = Lucky loser
- Alt = Alternate
- ITF = ITF entry
- PR = Protected ranking
- SR = Special ranking
- SE = Special exempt
- JE = Junior exempt
- JR = Junior Accelerator Programme entrant
- CO = College Accelerator Programme entrant
- NG = Next Gen Accelerator Program entrant
- w/o = Walkover
- r = Retired
- d = Defaulted

=== Finals ===
Semifinals
(Australia) John Alexander (Australia) Phil Dent	6	6
(Argentina) Elio Lito Alvarez (Paraguay) Víctor Pecci	4	3
(United States) Armistead Neely (Sweden) Tenny Svensson	4	6	2
(Pakistan) Haroon Rahim (United States) Erik van Dillen	6	3	6

Final
(Australia) John Alexander (Australia) Phil Dent	6	6
(Pakistan) Haroon Rahim (United States) Erik van Dillen	7	7

=== Top half ===
First Round
(Brazil) Joaquim Rasgado (United States) Larry Turville	6	5	6
(United States) William Brown (United States) George Hardie	4	7	4
(Australia) John James (Australia) Barry Phillips-Moore	1	7	6
(Sweden) Kjell Johansson (United Kingdom) Martin Robinson	6	5	1

Second Round
(Australia) John Alexander (Australia) Phil Dent	6	3	7
(Brazil) Joaquim Rasgado (United States) Larry Turville	3	6	5
(United Kingdom) Gerald Battrick (United Kingdom) Graham Stilwell	6	6
(United States) Woody Blocher (United States) Rick Fisher	2	4
(United Kingdom) Mark Farrell (United Kingdom) John Lloyd	6	1	7
(Australia) John James (Australia) Barry Phillips-Moore	3	6	5
(Argentina) Elio Lito Alvarez (Paraguay) Víctor Pecci	7	3	6
(Australia) Dick Crealy (United Kingdom) Colin Dowdeswell	5	6	3

Quarterfinals
(Australia) John Alexander (Australia) Phil Dent	6	4	6
(United Kingdom) Gerald Battrick (United Kingdom) Graham Stilwell	1	6	3
(United Kingdom) Mark Farrell (United Kingdom) John Lloyd	5	6	3
(Argentina) Elio Lito Alvarez (Paraguay) Víctor Pecci	7	3	6

Semifinals
(Australia) John Alexander (Australia) Phil Dent	6	6
(Argentina) Elio Lito Alvarez (Paraguay) Víctor Pecci	4	3

=== Bottom half ===
First Round
(Australia) Colin Dibley (South Africa) Raymond Moore	6	6	7
(United States) Norman Holmes (Serbia) Nikola Špear	7	1	5
(Pakistan) Haroon Rahim (United States) Erik van Dillen	6	6
(United Kingdom) John Feaver (South Africa) John Yuill	3	3

Second Round
(Australia) Colin Dibley (South Africa) Raymond Moore	7	5	7
(United States) Jeff Borowiak (Australia) Rod Laver	6	7	6
(United States) Armistead Neely (Sweden) Tenny Svensson	6	6
(Australia) John Bartlett (West Germany) Hans-Joachim Plötz	3	2
(Pakistan) Haroon Rahim (United States) Erik van Dillen	6	6
(Venezuela) Jorge Andrew (Venezuela) Humphrey Hose	3	3
(United States) Jimmy Connors (Romania) Ilie Năstase	6	6
(United States) Ben Bishop (United States) Joe Bouquin	1	3

Quarterfinals
(Australia) Colin Dibley (South Africa) Raymond Moore	6	2
(United States) Armistead Neely (Sweden) Tenny Svensson	7	6
(Pakistan) Haroon Rahim (United States) Erik van Dillen	w/o
(United States) Jimmy Connors (Romania) Ilie Năstase

Semifinals
(United States) Armistead Neely (Sweden) Tenny Svensson	4	6	2
(Pakistan) Haroon Rahim (United States) Erik van Dillen	6	3	6
