= 1975 City National Buckeye Championships =

- Date: August 12–18
- Edition: 6th
- Category: Grand Prix (Group B)
- Draw: 32S / 16D
- Prize money: $50,000
- Surface: Hard / outdoor
- Location: Grove City, Columbus, Ohio, United States
- Venue: Buckeye Boys Ranch

Champions

Singles
- (India) Vijay Amritraj

Doubles
- (United States) Bob Lutz / (United States) Stan Smith
- Columbus Open

The 1975 City National Buckeye Championships was a men's tennis tournament played on outdoor hard courts at the Buckeye Boys Ranch in Grove City, Columbus, Ohio in the United States that was part of Group B category of the 1975 Grand Prix circuit. It was the sixth edition of the tournament and was held from August 12 through August 18, 1975. Fourth-seeded Vijay Amritraj won the singles title and earned $9,000 first-prize money.

== Finals ==
=== Singles ===
(India) Vijay Amritraj defeated (United States) Bob Lutz 6–4, 7–5

- It was Amritraj's 1st singles title of the year and 5th of his career.

=== Doubles ===
(United States) Bob Lutz / (United States) Stan Smith defeated (West Germany) Jürgen Fassbender / (West Germany) Hans-Jürgen Pohmann 6–2, 6–7, 6–3
