= 1975 Torneo Godó =

- Date: 13–19 October
- Edition: 23rd
- Category: Grand Prix circuit (Grade A)
- Draw: 64S / 32D
- Surface: Clay / outdoor
- Location: Barcelona, Spain
- Venue: Real Club de Tenis Barcelona

Champions

Men's singles
- (Sweden) Björn Borg

Women's singles
- (United States) Janice Metcalf

Men's doubles
- (Sweden) Björn Borg / (Argentina) Guillermo Vilas
- Torneo Godó

The 1975 Torneo Godó or Trofeo Conde de Godó was a combined men's and women's tennis tournament that took place on outdoor clay courts at the Real Club de Tenis Barcelona in Barcelona, Spain. It was the 23rd edition of the tournament and the men's events were part of the 1975 Grand Prix circuit. It was held from 13 October until 19 October 1975. Fourth-seeded Björn Borg won the singles title.

== Finals ==
=== Men's singles ===
(Sweden) Björn Borg defeated (Italy) Adriano Panatta 1–6, 7–6, 6–3, 6–2

- It was Borg's 5th singles title of the year and the 13th of his career.

=== Women's singles ===
(United States) Janice Metcalf defeated (West Germany) Iris Riedel 4–6, 6–1, 6–4

=== Men's doubles ===
(Sweden) Björn Borg / (Argentina) Guillermo Vilas defeated (Poland) Wojciech Fibak / (West Germany) Karl Meiler 3–6, 6–4, 6–3
