= 1974 Suisse Open Gstaad – Singles =

Singles
- 1974 Suisse Open Gstaad

Final
- Champion: (Argentina) Guillermo Vilas
- Runner-up: (Spain) Manuel Orantes
- Score: 6–1, 6–2

Details
- Draw: 32

Events
Singles	Doubles
← 1973 ·	Swiss Open	· 1975 →

The 1974 Suisse Open Gstaad – Singles was an event of the 1974 Suisse Open Gstaad tennis tournament and was played on outdoor red clay courts in Gstaad, Switzerland from 8 July until 14 July 1974. The draw consistent of 32 players. Ilie Năstase was the defending Swiss Open singles champion but did not compete in this edition. Guillermo Vilas won the title by defeating Manuel Orantes in the final, 6–1, 6–2.

== Draw ==
=== Key ===
- Q = Qualifier
- WC = Wild card
- LL = Lucky loser
- Alt = Alternate
- SE = Special exempt
- PR = Protected ranking
- ITF = ITF entry
- JE = Junior exempt
- w/o = Walkover
- r = Retired
- d = Defaulted
- SR = Special ranking

=== Finals ===
Semifinals
(Australia) Roy Emerson	3	5	2
(Argentina) Guillermo Vilas	6	7	6
(India) Vijay Amritraj	1	3	2
(Spain) Manuel Orantes	6	6	6

Final
(Argentina) Guillermo Vilas	6	6
(Spain) Manuel Orantes	1	2

=== Top half ===
First Round
(Australia) Roy Emerson	6	6
(India) Anand Amritraj	2	1
(Spain) Antonio Munoz	4	3
(Brazil) Thomaz Koch	6	6
(France) Patrice Dominguez	6	6
(Czechoslovakia) Milan Holeček	2	1
(Mexico) Marcello Lara	8	6
(Paraguay) Víctor Pecci	6	4
(Argentina) Guillermo Vilas	6	7
(United Kingdom) John Lloyd	1	5
(France) Patrick Proisy	6	2	6
(Brazil) José Edison Mandarino	4	6	3
(Egypt) Ismail El Shafei	6	6
(Japan) Jun Kuki	0	2
(Spain) José Higueras	9	2	8
(Switzerland) Petr Kanderal	8	6	6

Second Round
(Australia) Roy Emerson	6	3	6
(Brazil) Thomaz Koch	2	6	0
(France) Patrice Dominguez	5	1
(Mexico) Marcello Lara	7	6
(Argentina) Guillermo Vilas	7	3	8
(France) Patrick Proisy	5	6	6
(Egypt) Ismail El Shafei	6	6
(Spain) José Higueras	2	4

Quarterfinals
(Australia) Roy Emerson	3	6	6
(Mexico) Marcello Lara	6	0	3
(Argentina) Guillermo Vilas	6	8
(Egypt) Ismail El Shafei	2	6

Semifinals
(Australia) Roy Emerson	3	5	2
(Argentina) Guillermo Vilas	6	7	6

=== Bottom half ===
First Round
(Argentina) Tito Vázquez	6	1	2
(Australia) Barry Phillips-Moore	4	6	6
(France) Wanaro N'Godrella	6	6
(United States) Jeff Borowiak	3	3
(South Africa) Derek Schroder	3	7	6
(France) Georges Goven	6	5	4
(Chile) Patricio Rodríguez	6	8
(India) Vijay Amritraj	8	9
(United States) Jim McManus	4	3
(Spain) Juan Gisbert Sr.	6	6
(India) Ashok Amritraj	5	8	4
(France) François Jauffret	7	6	6
(Switzerland) Dimitri Sturdza	6	7
(Australia) Dick Crealy	2	5
(Switzerland) Michel Burgener	4	3
(Spain) Manuel Orantes	6	6

Second Round
(Australia) Barry Phillips-Moore	6	6
(France) Wanaro N'Godrella	4	0
(South Africa) Derek Schroder	3	4
(India) Vijay Amritraj	6	6
(Spain) Juan Gisbert Sr.	7	6	4
(France) François Jauffret	5	8	6
(Switzerland) Dimitri Sturdza	1	1
(Spain) Manuel Orantes	6	6

Quarterfinals
(Australia) Barry Phillips-Moore	5	4
(India) Vijay Amritraj	7	6
(France) François Jauffret	9	3	3
(Spain) Manuel Orantes	8	6	6

Semifinals
(India) Vijay Amritraj	1	3	2
(Spain) Manuel Orantes	6	6	6
