= 1975 Pacific Coast Open – Doubles =

Doubles
- 1975 Pacific Coast Open

Final
- Champion: (United States) Fred McNair (United States) Sherwood Stewart
- Runner-up: (Australia) Allan Stone (Australia) Kim Warwick
- Score: 6–2, 7–6^{(7–3)}

Details
- Draw: 32
- Seeds: 8

Events
Singles	Doubles
- Pacific Coast Championships

The 1975 Pacific Coast Open – Doubles was an event of the 1975 Pacific Coast Open tennis tournament and was played on outdoor hard courts at the Cow Palace in San Francisco, California, in the United States between September 22 and September 28, 1975. The draw comprised 32 teams of which eight were seeded. Bob Lutz and Stan Smith were the defending Pacific Coast Open doubles champions but lost in the first round. The fourth-seeded team of Fred McNair and Sherwood Stewart won the title by defeating the unseeded team of Allan Stone and Kim Warwick in the final, 6–2, 7–6^{(7–3)}.

== Seeds ==
1. (United States) Brian Gottfried / (Mexico) Raúl Ramírez (second round)
2. (Australia) Dick Crealy / (Australia) Colin Dibley (quarterfinals)
3. (South Africa) Ray Moore / (New Zealand) Onny Parun (first round)
4. (United States) Fred McNair / (United States) Sherwood Stewart (champions)
5. (United States) Charlie Pasarell / (United States) Roscoe Tanner (second round)
6. (withdrew)
7. (West Germany) Jürgen Fassbender / (United States) Raz Reid (first round)
8. (United States) Dick Stockton / (United States) Erik van Dillen (quarterfinals)

== Draw ==
Key

- Q = Qualifier
- WC = Wild card
- LL = Lucky loser
- Alt = Alternate
- ITF = ITF entry
- PR = Protected ranking
- SR = Special ranking
- SE = Special exempt
- JE = Junior exempt
- JR = Junior Accelerator Programme entrant
- CO = College Accelerator Programme entrant
- NG = Next Gen Accelerator Program entrant
- w/o = Walkover
- r = Retired
- d = Defaulted

=== Finals ===
Semifinals
(Australia) Allan Stone (Australia) Kim Warwick	6	6
(Australia) Bob Carmichael (Australia) Geoff Masters	4	4
4	(United States) Fred McNair (United States) Sherwood Stewart	6	3	6
(United States) Dick Dell (United States) Billy Martin	1	6	3

Final
(Australia) Allan Stone (Australia) Kim Warwick	2	6^{3}
4	(United States) Fred McNair (United States) Sherwood Stewart	6	7^{7}

=== Top half ===
First Round
1	(United States) Brian Gottfried (Mexico) Raúl Ramírez	1	7^{7}	6
(United States) Hank Pfister (Australia) Adrian Rowe	6	6^{1}	2
(Australia) Allan Stone (Australia) Kim Warwick	6	6
(Argentina) Lito Álvarez (Paraguay) Víctor Pecci	0	3
LL	(South Africa) Cliff Drysdale unknown	6	6
(United States) Henry Kamakana (United States) Greg Shephard	4	3
(United States) Arthur Ashe (United States) Dennis Ralston	6	7^{7}
(United States) Tom Gorman (United States) Bob Lutz	4	6^{2}
3	(South Africa) Ray Moore (New Zealand) Onny Parun	5	6	5
(Australia) Steve Docherty (South Africa) Bernard Mitton	7	4	7
(Australia) Bob Carmichael (Australia) Geoff Masters	6	6
(United States) Jim Delaney (United States) Tim Gullikson	1	0
5	(United States) Charlie Pasarell (United States) Roscoe Tanner	7^{7}	3	7
(United States) Mike Cahill (United States) John Whitlinger	6^{4}	6	5
(United States) Robert Kreiss (India) Sashi Menon
(United States) Jeff Borowiak (Pakistan) Haroon Rahim	w/o

Second Round
1	(United States) Brian Gottfried (Mexico) Raúl Ramírez	4	6	6^{6}
(Australia) Allan Stone (Australia) Kim Warwick	6	4	7^{8}
LL	(South Africa) Cliff Drysdale unknown	1	4
(United States) Arthur Ashe (United States) Dennis Ralston	6	6
(Australia) Steve Docherty (South Africa) Bernard Mitton	4	5
(Australia) Bob Carmichael (Australia) Geoff Masters	6	7
5	(United States) Charlie Pasarell (United States) Roscoe Tanner	6^{2}	6^{3}
(United States) Jeff Borowiak (Pakistan) Haroon Rahim	7^{7}	7^{7}

Quarterfinals
(Australia) Allan Stone (Australia) Kim Warwick	w/o
(United States) Arthur Ashe (United States) Dennis Ralston
(Australia) Bob Carmichael (Australia) Geoff Masters	6	6
(United States) Jeff Borowiak (Pakistan) Haroon Rahim	3	4

Semifinals
(Australia) Allan Stone (Australia) Kim Warwick	6	6
(Australia) Bob Carmichael (Australia) Geoff Masters	4	4

=== Bottom half ===
First Round
(United States) Steve Krulevitz (United States) Mike MacHette	w/o
(United Kingdom) Graham Stilwell (United States) Trey Waltke
(United States) William Brown (Brazil) Carlos Kirmayr	4	6^{6}
8	(United States) Dick Stockton (United States) Erik van Dillen	6	7^{8}
(United States) Matt Mitchell unknown	0	4
(United States) John Andrews (United States) Mike Estep	6	6
(United States) Jim McManus (United States) Jim Osborne	0	6^{3}
4	(United States) Fred McNair (United States) Sherwood Stewart	6	7^{7}
(Sweden) Tenny Svensson (Netherlands) Rolf Thung	6	3	4
(Venezuela) Jorge Andrew (Bolivia) Ramiro Benavides	3	6	6
(United States) Dick Dell (United States) Billy Martin	7	6
7	(West Germany) Jürgen Fassbender (United States) Raz Reid	5	0
(United States) Doug King (United States) Bill Maze	4	6	1
(United States) Woody Blocher (United States) George Hardie	6	3	6
(United States) Gene Mayer (United States) Sandy Mayer	3	3
2	(Australia) Dick Crealy (Australia) Colin Dibley	6	6

Second Round
(United States) Steve Krulevitz (United States) Mike MacHette	6^{3}	2
8	(United States) Dick Stockton (United States) Erik van Dillen	7^{7}	6
(United States) John Andrews (United States) Mike Estep	2	1
4	(United States) Fred McNair (United States) Sherwood Stewart	6	6
(Venezuela) Jorge Andrew (Bolivia) Ramiro Benavides	2	3
(United States) Dick Dell (United States) Billy Martin	6	6
(United States) Woody Blocher (United States) George Hardie	3	3
2	(Australia) Dick Crealy (Australia) Colin Dibley	6	6

Quarterfinals
8	(United States) Dick Stockton (United States) Erik van Dillen	7^{7}	5	6^{4}
4	(United States) Fred McNair (United States) Sherwood Stewart	6^{5}	7	7^{7}
(United States) Dick Dell (United States) Billy Martin	4	6	7^{7}
2	(Australia) Dick Crealy (Australia) Colin Dibley	6	3	6^{2}

Semifinals
4	(United States) Fred McNair (United States) Sherwood Stewart	6	3	6
(United States) Dick Dell (United States) Billy Martin	1	6	3
