= 1975 Pacific Coast Open – Singles =

Singles
- 1975 Pacific Coast Open

Final
- Champion: (United States) Arthur Ashe
- Runner-up: (Argentina) Guillermo Vilas
- Score: 6–0, 7–6^{(7–4)}

Details
- Draw: 64
- Seeds: 16

Events
| Singles | Doubles |
| ← 1974 · | Pacific Coast Championships | · 1976 → |

The 1975 Pacific Coast Open – Singles was an event of the 1975 Pacific Coast Open tennis tournament and was played on outdoor hard courts at the Cow Palace in San Francisco in the United States between September 22 and September 28, 1975. The draw comprised 64 players and 16 of them were seeded. Ross Case was the defending Pacific Coast Open singles champion but did not take part in this edition. Second-seeded Arthur Ashe won the title by defeating first-seeded Guillermo Vilas 6–0, 7–6^{(7–4)} in the final.

== Seeds ==
1. (Argentina) Guillermo Vilas (final)
2. (United States) Arthur Ashe (champion)
3. (United States) Roscoe Tanner (first round)
4. (Mexico) Raúl Ramírez (second round)
5. (Withdrew)
6. (United States) Harold Solomon (first round)
7. (United States) Marty Riessen (first round)
8. (New Zealand) Onny Parun (second round)
9. (United States) Cliff Richey (third round)
10. (United States) Dick Stockton (quarterfinals)
11. (United States) Brian Gottfried (third round)
12. (United States) Bob Lutz (quarterfinals)
13. (United States) Sandy Mayer (quarterfinals)
14. (Australia) Kim Warwick (second round)
15. (United States) Charlie Pasarell (third round)
16. (South Africa) Cliff Drysdale (quarterfinals)

Click on the seed number of a player to go to their draw section.

== Draw ==
=== Key ===
- Q = Qualifier
- WC = Wild card
- LL = Lucky loser
- Alt = Alternate
- SE = Special exempt
- PR = Protected ranking
- ITF = ITF entry
- JE = Junior exempt
- w/o = Walkover
- r = Retired
- d = Defaulted
- SR = Special ranking

=== Finals ===
Quarterfinals
2 | (United States) Arthur Ashe | 4 | 6 | 6
13 | (United States) Sandy Mayer | 6 | 2 | 3
16 | (South Africa) Cliff Drysdale | 3 | 4
(Australia) Geoff Masters | 6 | 6
(United States) Jeff Borowiak | 6 | 6
10 | (United States) Dick Stockton | 3 | 3
12 | (United States) Bob Lutz | 2 | 6^{3}
1 | (Argentina) Guillermo Vilas | 6 | 7^{7}

Semifinals
2 | (United States) Arthur Ashe | 6 | 6
(Australia) Geoff Masters | 2 | 2
(United States) Jeff Borowiak | 7 | 4 | 4
1 | (Argentina) Guillermo Vilas | 5 | 6 | 6

Final
2 | (United States) Arthur Ashe | 6 | 7^{7}
1 | (Argentina) Guillermo Vilas | 0 | 6^{4}

=== Top half ===
==== Section 1 ====
First Round
2 | (United States) Arthur Ashe | 6 | 6
(United States) Billy Martin | 3 | 3
(United States) Trey Waltke | 6^{4} | 7 | 6
(United States) Hank Pfister | 7^{7} | 5 | 3
9 | (United States) Cliff Richey | 6 | 6
(South Africa) Bernard Mitton | 4 | 3
(United States) Brian Teacher | 6 | 3 | 3
(United States) Steve Krulevitz | 0 | 6 | 6
8 | (New Zealand) Onny Parun | 6 | 4 | 6
(United States) Tim Gullikson | 3 | 6 | 1
(Netherlands) Rolf Thung | 6 | 6
(Bolivia) Ramiro Benavides | 3 | 2
13 | (United States) Sandy Mayer | 6 | 6
(United States) John Holladay | 1 | 0
(United States) Raz Reid | 6 | 5 | 5
(Argentina) Elio Lito Álvarez | 4 | 7 | 7

Second Round
2 | (United States) Arthur Ashe | 6 | 7^{7}
(United States) Trey Waltke | 4 | 6^{5}
9 | (United States) Cliff Richey | 6 | 6
(United States) Steve Krulevitz | 3 | 1
8 | (New Zealand) Onny Parun | 3 | 4
(Netherlands) Rolf Thung | 6 | 6
13 | (United States) Sandy Mayer | 6 | 6
(Argentina) Elio Lito Álvarez | 4 | 1

Third Round
2 | (United States) Arthur Ashe | 6 | 6
9 | (United States) Cliff Richey | 4 | 1
(Netherlands) Rolf Thung | 2 | 4
13 | (United States) Sandy Mayer | 6 | 6

Quarterfinals
2 | (United States) Arthur Ashe | 4 | 6 | 6
13 | (United States) Sandy Mayer | 6 | 2 | 3

==== Section 2 ====
First Round
3 | (United States) Roscoe Tanner | 6^{2} | 7^{7} | 2
(United Kingdom) Graham Stilwell | 7^{7} | 6^{3} | 6
(United States) Jim McManus | 3 | 2
(South Africa) Ray Moore | 6 | 6
16 | (South Africa) Cliff Drysdale | 6 | 7^{7}
(United States) John Andrews | 4 | 6^{3}
(Sweden) Tenny Svensson | 7^{7} | 7^{7}
(United States) Jeff Austin | 6^{2} | 6^{3}
7 | (United States) Marty Riessen | 1 | 7 | 4
(Australia) Geoff Masters | 6 | 5 | 6
(United States) Erik van Dillen | 7^{7} | 1 | 6
(Australia) Bob Carmichael | 6^{5} | 6 | 3
15 | (United States) Charlie Pasarell | 6 | 7^{8}
(West Germany) Jürgen Fassbender | 3 | 6^{6}
(United States) Mike Cahill | 6 | 2 | 4
(Paraguay) Víctor Pecci | 3 | 6 | 6

Second Round
(United Kingdom) Graham Stilwell | 6 | 6
(South Africa) Ray Moore | 1 | 3
16 | (South Africa) Cliff Drysdale | 6 | 6
(Sweden) Tenny Svensson | 3 | 4
(Australia) Geoff Masters | 7^{8} | 6
(United States) Erik van Dillen | 6^{6} | 2
15 | (United States) Charlie Pasarell | 5 | 6 | 6
(Paraguay) Víctor Pecci | 7 | 4 | 1

Third Round
(United Kingdom) Graham Stilwell | 4 | 1
16 | (South Africa) Cliff Drysdale | 6 | 6
(Australia) Geoff Masters | 6 | 6
15 | (United States) Charlie Pasarell | 2 | 3

Quarterfinals
16 | (South Africa) Cliff Drysdale | 3 | 4
(Australia) Geoff Masters | 6 | 6

=== Bottom half ===
==== Section 3 ====
First Round
(Pakistan) Haroon Rahim | 7^{7} | 3 | 4
(United States) George Hardie | 6^{5} | 6 | 6
(United States) Thomas Gorman | 7^{7} | 4 | 2
14 | (Australia) Kim Warwick | 6^{3} | 6 | 6
(United States) Sherwood Stewart | 6 | 6^{4} | 2
(United States) Dennis Ralston | 4 | 7^{7} | 6
(United States) Jeff Borowiak | 6 | 6
6 | (United States) Harold Solomon | 3 | 4
(United States) Dick Dell | 2 | 6 | 4
(India) Sashi Menon | 6 | 3 | 6
(United States) Henry Bunis | 6 | 2 | 1
10 | (United States) Dick Stockton | 3 | 6 | 6
(United States) Woody Blocher | 2 | 4
(United States) Peter Fleming | 6 | 6
(Australia) Dick Crealy | 2 | 7^{7} | 3
4 | (Mexico) Raúl Ramírez | 6 | 6^{2} | 6

Second Round
(United States) George Hardie | 3 | 6 | 7^{7}
14 | (Australia) Kim Warwick | 6 | 3 | 6^{4}
(United States) Dennis Ralston | 4 | 5
(United States) Jeff Borowiak | 6 | 7
(India) Sashi Menon | 4 | 0
10 | (United States) Dick Stockton | 6 | 6
(United States) Peter Fleming | 6 | 6
4 | (Mexico) Raúl Ramírez | 3 | 4

Third Round
(United States) George Hardie | 3 | 2
(United States) Jeff Borowiak | 6 | 6
10 | (United States) Dick Stockton | 6 | 4 | 6
(United States) Peter Fleming | 4 | 6 | 3

Quarterfinals
(United States) Jeff Borowiak | 6 | 6
10 | (United States) Dick Stockton | 3 | 3

==== Section 4 ====
First Round
(United States) Jim Delaney | 6 | 6
(Australia) Barry Phillips-Moore | 3 | 2
(Brazil) João Soares | 4 | 3
12 | (United States) Bob Lutz | 6 | 6
(United States) Robert Kreiss | 4 | 6 | 4
(Mexico) Joaquín Loyo-Mayo | 6 | 2 | 6
(Brazil) Carlos Kirmayr | 6 | 3 | 2
LL | (Venezuela) Jorge Andrew | 4 | 6 | 6
(United States) Fred McNair | 4 | 2
(Australia) Colin Dibley | 6 | 6
(United States) John Whitlinger | 2 | 1
11 | (United States) Brian Gottfried | 6 | 6
(Australia) Steve Docherty | 4 | 6^{5}
(Australia) Allan Stone | 6 | 7^{7}
(United States) Mike Estep | 1 | 4
1 | (Argentina) Guillermo Vilas | 6 | 6

Second Round
(United States) Jim Delaney | 3 | 2
12 | (United States) Bob Lutz | 6 | 6
(Mexico) Joaquín Loyo-Mayo | 3 | 5
LL | (Venezuela) Jorge Andrew | 6 | 7
(Australia) Colin Dibley | 4 | 4
11 | (United States) Brian Gottfried | 6 | 6
(Australia) Allan Stone | 6^{4} | 0
1 | (Argentina) Guillermo Vilas | 7^{7} | 6

Third Round
12 | (United States) Bob Lutz | 6 | 7
LL | (Venezuela) Jorge Andrew | 0 | 5
11 | (United States) Brian Gottfried | 6 | 1 | 4
1 | (Argentina) Guillermo Vilas | 4 | 6 | 6

Quarterfinals
12 | (United States) Bob Lutz | 2 | 6^{3}
1 | (Argentina) Guillermo Vilas | 6 | 7^{7}
