= 1975 Torneo Godó – Men's doubles =

Men's doubles
- 1975 Torneo Godó

Final
- Champion: (Sweden) Björn Borg (Argentina) Guillermo Vilas
- Runner-up: (Poland) Wojciech Fibak (West Germany) Karl Meiler
- Score: 3–6, 6–4, 6–3

Details
- Draw: 32
- Seeds: 8

Events
| Singles | men | women |
| Doubles | men | women |
- Barcelona Open

The 1975 Torneo Godó – Men's doubles was an event of the 1975 Torneo Godó tennis tournament and was played on outdoor clay courts at the Real Club de Tenis Barcelona in Barcelona, Spain, between 13 October and 19 October 1975. The draw consisted of 32 team and eight of them were seeded. Juan Gisbert and Ilie Năstase were the defending Torneo Godó doubles champions but did not compete together in this edition. The sixth-seeded team of Björn Borg and Guillermo Vilas won the doubles title after a win in the final against fifth-seeded pairing Wojciech Fibak and Karl Meiler, 3–6, 6–4, 6–3.

== Seeds ==
1. (Spain) Juan Gisbert Sr. / (Spain) Manuel Orantes (semifinals)
2. (Czechoslovakia) Jan Kodeš / (Romania) Ilie Năstase (semifinals)
3. (Germany) Jürgen Fassbender / (Germany) Hans-Jürgen Pohmann (quarterfinals)
4. (United States) Fred McNair / (United States) Sherwood Stewart (first round)
5. (Poland) Wojciech Fibak / (Germany) Karl Meiler (final)
6. (Sweden) Björn Borg / (Argentina) Guillermo Vilas (champions)
7. (Chile) Patricio Cornejo / (Chile) Jaime Fillol (first round)
8. (South Africa) Raymond Moore / (New Zealand) Onny Parun (quarterfinals)

== Draw ==
Key

- Q = Qualifier
- WC = Wild card
- LL = Lucky loser
- Alt = Alternate
- ITF = ITF entry
- PR = Protected ranking
- SR = Special ranking
- SE = Special exempt
- JE = Junior exempt
- JR = Junior Accelerator Programme entrant
- CO = College Accelerator Programme entrant
- NG = Next Gen Accelerator Program entrant
- w/o = Walkover
- r = Retired
- d = Defaulted

=== Finals ===
Semifinals
1 | (Spain) Juan Gisbert Sr. (Spain) Manuel Orantes | 3 | 7 | 3
5 | (Poland) Wojciech Fibak (Germany) Karl Meiler | 6 | 6 | 6
6 | (Sweden) Björn Borg (Argentina) Guillermo Vilas | 6 | 7
2 | (Czechoslovakia) Jan Kodeš (Romania) Ilie Năstase | 3 | 6

Final
5 | (Poland) Wojciech Fibak (Germany) Karl Meiler | 6 | 4 | 3
6 | (Sweden) Björn Borg (Argentina) Guillermo Vilas | 3 | 6 | 6

=== Top half ===
First Round
1 | (Spain) Juan Gisbert Sr. (Spain) Manuel Orantes | 7 | 6
(United States) Eddie Dibbs (France) François Jauffret | 6 | 3
(United States) Victor Amaya (United States) George Hardie | 6 | 6
(United States) Mike Fishbach (United Kingdom) Martin Robinson | 1 | 2
8 | (South Africa) Raymond Moore (New Zealand) Onny Parun | 7 | 6
(United States) Mike MacHette (India) Jasjit Singh | 5 | 0
(Argentina) Julián Ganzábal (Argentina) Tito Vázquez | 6 | 7
(Chile) Carlos Feldstedt (Chile) Jaime Pinto Bravo | 3 | 5
4 | (United States) Fred McNair (United States) Sherwood Stewart | 5 | 6 | 4
(Argentina) Elio Lito Alvarez (Paraguay) Víctor Pecci | 7 | 4 | 6
(Egypt) Ismail El Shafei (United States) Mike Estep | 6 | 7
(Spain) Ángel Giménez (Spain) Andrés Gimeno | 4 | 6
5 | (Poland) Wojciech Fibak (Germany) Karl Meiler | 7 | 2 | 6
(Bolivia) Ramiro Benavides (Brazil) José Edison Mandarino | 5 | 6 | 1
(Spain) Juan Herrera (Spain) Antonio Barranco | 2 | 3
(United Kingdom) Colin Dowdeswell (South Africa) Bernard Mitton | 6 | 6

Second Round
1 | (Spain) Juan Gisbert Sr. (Spain) Manuel Orantes | 7 | 6
(United States) Victor Amaya (United States) George Hardie | 5 | 2
8 | (South Africa) Raymond Moore (New Zealand) Onny Parun | 7 | 0 | 8
(Argentina) Julián Ganzábal (Argentina) Tito Vázquez | 5 | 6 | 6
(Argentina) Elio Lito Alvarez (Paraguay) Víctor Pecci | 6 | 6
(Egypt) Ismail El Shafei (United States) Mike Estep | 3 | 2
5 | (Poland) Wojciech Fibak (Germany) Karl Meiler | 4 | 7 | 6
(United Kingdom) Colin Dowdeswell (South Africa) Bernard Mitton | 6 | 6 | 1

Quarterfinals
1 | (Spain) Juan Gisbert Sr. (Spain) Manuel Orantes | 6 | 6
8 | (South Africa) Raymond Moore (New Zealand) Onny Parun | 2 | 3
(Argentina) Elio Lito Alvarez (Paraguay) Víctor Pecci | 4 | 4
5 | (Poland) Wojciech Fibak (Germany) Karl Meiler | 6 | 6

Semifinals
1 | (Spain) Juan Gisbert Sr. (Spain) Manuel Orantes | 3 | 7 | 3
5 | (Poland) Wojciech Fibak (Germany) Karl Meiler | 6 | 6 | 6

=== Bottom half ===
First Round
(Spain) José Castañón (Spain) Javier Soler | 6 | 4 | 2
(Colombia) Iván Molina (Colombia) Jairo Velasco Sr. | 1 | 6 | 6
(United Kingdom) John Feaver (India) Sashi Menon | 6 | 2
6 | (Sweden) Björn Borg (Argentina) Guillermo Vilas | 7 | 6
(Sweden) Birger Andersson (Brazil) Fernando Gentil | 7 | 4 | 6
(United Kingdom) Mark Farrell (United Kingdom) Stephen Warboys | 5 | 6 | 4
(Brazil) Carlos Kirmayr (United States) Jeff Austin | 6 | 3 | 3
3 | (Germany) Jürgen Fassbender (Germany) Hans-Jürgen Pohmann | 2 | 6 | 6
(Czechoslovakia) Jiří Hřebec (Austria) Hans Kary | 6 | 6
(Australia) Barry Phillips-Moore (United Kingdom) Graham Stilwell | 4 | 4
(Spain) José Higueras (Spain) Antonio Munoz | 7 | 5 | 7
7 | (Chile) Patricio Cornejo (Chile) Jaime Fillol | 6 | 7 | 5
(Argentina) Ricardo Cano (Chile) Belus Prajoux | 6 | 6
(United States) Jim McManus (Chile) Patricio Rodríguez | 2 | 3
(Argentina) Carlos Landó (Argentina) Francisco Mastelli | 1 | 3
2 | (Czechoslovakia) Jan Kodeš (Romania) Ilie Năstase | 6 | 6

Second Round
(Colombia) Iván Molina (Colombia) Jairo Velasco Sr.
6 | (Sweden) Björn Borg (Argentina) Guillermo Vilas | w/o
(Sweden) Birger Andersson (Brazil) Fernando Gentil | 2 | 1
3 | (Germany) Jürgen Fassbender (Germany) Hans-Jürgen Pohmann | 6 | 6
(Czechoslovakia) Jiří Hřebec (Austria) Hans Kary | 6 | 6
(Spain) José Higueras (Spain) Antonio Munoz | 3 | 3
(Argentina) Ricardo Cano (Chile) Belus Prajoux | 4 | 2
2 | (Czechoslovakia) Jan Kodeš (Romania) Ilie Năstase | 6 | 6

Quarterfinals
6 | (Sweden) Björn Borg (Argentina) Guillermo Vilas | 2 | 7 | 6
3 | (Germany) Jürgen Fassbender (Germany) Hans-Jürgen Pohmann | 6 | 5 | 1
(Czechoslovakia) Jiří Hřebec (Austria) Hans Kary | 3 | 2
2 | (Czechoslovakia) Jan Kodeš (Romania) Ilie Năstase | 6 | 6

Semifinals
6 | (Sweden) Björn Borg (Argentina) Guillermo Vilas | 6 | 7
2 | (Czechoslovakia) Jan Kodeš (Romania) Ilie Năstase | 3 | 6
