= 1975 Torneo Godó – Men's singles =

Men's singles
- 1975 Torneo Godó

Final
- Champion: (Sweden) Björn Borg
- Runner-up: (Italy) Adriano Panatta
- Score: 1–6, 7–6, 6–3, 6–2

Details
- Draw: 64
- Seeds: 16

Events
Singles	men	women
Doubles	men	women
- Barcelona Open

The 1975 Torneo Godó – Men's singles was an event of the 1975 Torneo Godó tennis tournament and was played on outdoor clay courts at the Real Club de Tenis Barcelona in Barcelona, Spain, between 13 October and 19 October 1975. The draw comprised 64 players and 16 of them were seeded. Third-seeded Ilie Năstase was the defending Torneo Godó singles champion but lost in the quarterfinal to Jaime Fillol. Fourth-seeded Björn Borg won the singles title after a win in the final against seventh-seeded Adriano Panatta, 1–6, 7–6, 6–3, 6–2.

== Seeds ==
1. (Argentina) Guillermo Vilas (semifinals)
2. (Spain) Manuel Orantes (quarterfinals)
3. (Romania) Ilie Năstase (quarterfinals)
4. (Sweden) Björn Borg (champion)
5. (Czech Republic) Jan Kodeš (quarterfinals)
6. (Chile) Jaime Fillol (semifinals)
7. (Italy) Adriano Panatta (final)
8. (United States) Eddie Dibbs (quarterfinals)
9. (New Zealand) Onny Parun (third round)
10. (Germany) Karl Meiler (third round)
11. (France) François Jauffret (third round)
12. (Spain) Juan Gisbert Sr. (first round)
13. (Italy) Paolo Bertolucci (first round)
14. (Spain) José Higueras (third round)
15. (Poland) Wojciech Fibak (first round)
16. (Egypt) Ismail El Shafei (first round)

Click on the seed number of a player to go to their draw section.

== Draw ==
Key

- Q = Qualifier
- WC = Wild card
- LL = Lucky loser
- Alt = Alternate
- ITF = ITF entry
- PR = Protected ranking
- SR = Special ranking
- SE = Special exempt
- JE = Junior exempt
- JR = Junior Accelerator Programme entrant
- CO = College Accelerator Programme entrant
- NG = Next Gen Accelerator Program entrant
- w/o = Walkover
- r = Retired
- d = Defaulted

=== Finals ===
Quarterfinals
1	(Argentina) Guillermo Vilas	6	3	6
8	(United States) Eddie Dibbs	0	6	2
4	(Sweden) Björn Borg	6	2	6
5	(Czech Republic) Jan Kodeš	1	6	4
6	(Chile) Jaime Fillol	6	2	9
3	(Romania) Ilie Năstase	1	6	7
7	(Italy) Adriano Panatta	6	6
2	(Spain) Manuel Orantes	1	2

Semifinals
1	(Argentina) Guillermo Vilas	3	1	6
4	(Sweden) Björn Borg	6	6	7
6	(Chile) Jaime Fillol	2	1	6	2
7	(Italy) Adriano Panatta	6	6	0	6

Final
4	(Sweden) Björn Borg	1	7	6	6
7	(Italy) Adriano Panatta	6	6	3	2

=== Top half ===
==== Section 1 ====
First Round
1	(Argentina) Guillermo Vilas	6	6
Q	(Chile) Jaime Pinto Bravo	1	4
(Brazil) José Edison Mandarino	6	7
(United States) Victor Amaya	2	5
16	(Egypt) Ismail El Shafei	2	6
(Argentina) Elio Lito Alvarez	6	8
(United Kingdom) Martin Robinson	1	4
(Czech Republic) Jiří Hřebec	6	6
8	(United States) Eddie Dibbs	6	6
(United Kingdom) Graham Stilwell	3	1
(South Africa) Bernard Mitton	6	6
Q	(Argentina) Tito Vázquez	2	4
9	(New Zealand) Onny Parun	7	6
(Sweden) Birger Andersson	5	1
(Spain) Ángel Giménez	3	6
(South Africa) Raymond Moore	6	8

Second Round
1	(Argentina) Guillermo Vilas	6	6
(Brazil) José Edison Mandarino	1	1
(Argentina) Elio Lito Alvarez	2	5
(Czech Republic) Jiří Hřebec	6	7
8	(United States) Eddie Dibbs	6	6
(South Africa) Bernard Mitton	0	1
9	(New Zealand) Onny Parun	6	5	6
(South Africa) Raymond Moore	4	7	2

Third Round
1	(Argentina) Guillermo Vilas	7	6
(Czech Republic) Jiří Hřebec	6	4
8	(United States) Eddie Dibbs	6	6
9	(New Zealand) Onny Parun	4	3

Quarterfinals
1	(Argentina) Guillermo Vilas	6	3	6
8	(United States) Eddie Dibbs	0	6	2

==== Section 2 ====
First Round
4	(Sweden) Björn Borg	4	6	6
(United Kingdom) John Feaver	6	2	1
(Paraguay) Víctor Pecci	4	7	3
(United States) Sherwood Stewart	6	5	6
13	(Italy) Paolo Bertolucci	7	6	5
(Argentina) Julián Ganzábal	5	8	7
(Germany) Harald Elschenbroich	6	6
(Brazil) Carlos Kirmayr	1	2
5	(Czech Republic) Jan Kodeš	6	6	6
(Austria) Hans Kary	3	8	2
(Colombia) Iván Molina	6	6
Q	(Spain) Antonio Domenech	2	1
12	(Spain) Juan Gisbert Sr.	0^{r}
(United Kingdom) John Lloyd	4
(Germany) Jürgen Fassbender	7	6
(Bolivia) Ramiro Benavides	5	4

Second Round
4	(Sweden) Björn Borg	6	6
(United States) Sherwood Stewart	1	0
(Argentina) Julián Ganzábal	3	6	6
(Germany) Harald Elschenbroich	6	2	3
5	(Czech Republic) Jan Kodeš	6	6
(Colombia) Iván Molina	3	4
(United Kingdom) John Lloyd	6	7
(Germany) Jürgen Fassbender	4	5

Third Round
4	(Sweden) Björn Borg	6	6
(Argentina) Julián Ganzábal	2	3
5	(Czech Republic) Jan Kodeš	7	1	6
(United Kingdom) John Lloyd	5	6	4

Quarterfinals
4	(Sweden) Björn Borg	6	2	6
5	(Czech Republic) Jan Kodeš	1	6	4

=== Bottom half ===
==== Section 3 ====
First Round
(Spain) Antonio Munoz	6	8
Q	(United States) Steven Turner	2	6
(United States) Fred McNair	6	5	2
11	(France) François Jauffret	3	7	6
(India) Jasjit Singh	6	6
Q	(Argentina) Francisco Mastelli	2	2
(United States) Jeff Austin	4	3
6	(Chile) Jaime Fillol	6	6
(Germany) Ulrich Pinner	6	6
(Chile) Patricio Cornejo	4	2
Q	(United States) George Hardie	1	2
14	(Spain) José Higueras	6	6
(India) Sashi Menon	7	5	0^{r}
(Germany) Hans-Jürgen Pohmann	5	7	2
(Spain) Juan Herrera	1	1
3	(Romania) Ilie Năstase	6	6

Second Round
(Spain) Antonio Munoz	4	5
11	(France) François Jauffret	6	7
(India) Jasjit Singh	3	4
6	(Chile) Jaime Fillol	6	6
(Germany) Ulrich Pinner	1	1
14	(Spain) José Higueras	6	6
(Germany) Hans-Jürgen Pohmann	3	3
3	(Romania) Ilie Năstase	6	6

Third Round
11	(France) François Jauffret	1	3
6	(Chile) Jaime Fillol	6	6
14	(Spain) José Higueras	6	6	6
3	(Romania) Ilie Năstase	7	4	8

Quarterfinals
6	(Chile) Jaime Fillol	6	2	9
3	(Romania) Ilie Năstase	1	6	7

==== Section 4 ====
First Round
(Argentina) Ricardo Cano	7	6
(Spain) Javier Soler	5	1
(United States) Mike MacHette	3	2
10	(Germany) Karl Meiler	6	6
(United States) Mike Estep	2	3
Q	(Spain) Antonio Barranco	6	6
(Spain) José Castañón	4	7	1
7	(Italy) Adriano Panatta	6	5	6
(United States) Mike Fishbach	10	2
(United Kingdom) Colin Dowdeswell	12	6
(Colombia) Jairo Velasco Sr.	8	10
15	(Poland) Wojciech Fibak	6	8
(Australia) Barry Phillips-Moore	6	7
Q	(United Kingdom) Stephen Warboys	3	5
(Chile) Belus Prajoux	4	4
2	(Spain) Manuel Orantes	6	6

Second Round
(Argentina) Ricardo Cano	4	6	2
10	(Germany) Karl Meiler	6	3	6
Q	(Spain) Antonio Barranco	2	1
7	(Italy) Adriano Panatta	6	6
(United Kingdom) Colin Dowdeswell	7	3	6
(Colombia) Jairo Velasco Sr.	6	6	2
(Australia) Barry Phillips-Moore	1	1
2	(Spain) Manuel Orantes	6	6

Third Round
10	(Germany) Karl Meiler	3	1
7	(Italy) Adriano Panatta	6	6
(United Kingdom) Colin Dowdeswell	5	5
2	(Spain) Manuel Orantes	7	7

Quarterfinals
7	(Italy) Adriano Panatta	6	6
2	(Spain) Manuel Orantes	1	2
