= 1975 Suisse Open Gstaad =

Torneo di Tennis

- Date: 7–13 July
- Edition: 30th
- Category: Grand Prix (Grade B)
- Draw: 32S / 16D
- Prize money: $50,000
- Surface: Clay / outdoor
- Location: Gstaad, Switzerland

Champions

Singles
- (Australia) Ken Rosewall

Doubles
- (West Germany) Jürgen Fassbender / (West Germany) Manuel Orantes
- Swiss Open

The 1975 Suisse Open Gstaad was a men's tennis tournament played on outdoor clay courts in Gstaad, Switzerland. It was the 30th edition of the tournament and was held from 7 July through 13 July 1975. The tournament was part of the Grand Prix tennis circuit and categorized in Group B. Ken Rosewall won the singles title and the accompanying $8,000 prize money.

== Finals ==
=== Singles ===
(Australia) Ken Rosewall defeated (West Germany) Karl Meiler 6–4, 6–4, 6–3

=== Doubles ===
(West Germany) Jürgen Fassbender / (West Germany) Hans-Jürgen Pohmann defeated (Rhodesia) Colin Dowdeswell / (Australia) Ken Rosewall 6–4, 9–7, 6–1
