= 1974 Suisse Open Gstaad – Doubles =

Tennis event results

Doubles
- 1974 Suisse Open Gstaad

Final
- Champion: (Spain) José Higueras (Spain) Manuel Orantes
- Runner-up: (Australia) Roy Emerson (Brazil) Thomaz Koch
- Score: 7–5, 0–6, 6–1, 9–8

Details
- Draw: 16

Events
Singles	Doubles
- Swiss Open

The 1974 Suisse Open Gstaad – Doubles was an event of the 1974 Suisse Open Gstaad tennis tournament and was played on outdoor red clay courts in Gstaad, Switzerland from 8 July until 14 July 1974. The draw consisted of 16 teams. Andrés Gimeno and Antonio Muñoz were the defending Swiss Open doubles champions but did not compete together in this edition. The Spanish team of José Higueras and Manuel Orantes won the title by defeating Roy Emerson and Thomaz Koch in the final, 7–5, 0–6, 6–1, 9–8.

== Draw ==
Key

- Q = Qualifier
- WC = Wild card
- LL = Lucky loser
- Alt = Alternate
- ITF = ITF entry
- PR = Protected ranking
- SR = Special ranking
- SE = Special exempt
- JE = Junior exempt
- JR = Junior Accelerator Programme entrant
- CO = College Accelerator Programme entrant
- NG = Next Gen Accelerator Program entrant
- w/o = Walkover
- r = Retired
- d = Defaulted

First Round
(Spain) José Higueras (Spain) Manuel Orantes	5	6	6
(Czechoslovakia) Milan Holeček (Australia) Barry Phillips-Moore	7	2	4
(Argentina) Guillermo Vilas (Argentina) Tito Vázquez	6	3	6
(Switzerland) Michel Burgener (France) Patrick Proisy	2	6	3
(Australia) Dick Crealy (Egypt) Ismail El Shafei	6	6
(Paraguay) Víctor Pecci (Chile) Patricio Rodríguez	4	2
(India) Anand Amritraj (India) Vijay Amritraj	9	4	6
(France) Patrice Dominguez (France) Wanaro N'Godrella	8	6	3
(Mexico) Marcello Lara (Spain) Antonio Muñoz	4	6	6
(United States) Jeff Borowiak (United States) Jim McManus	6	4	4
(India) Ashok Amritraj (Japan) Jun Kuki	6	4	0
(France) Georges Goven (France) François Jauffret	4	6	6
(Switzerland) Petr Kanderal (Switzerland) Dimitri Sturdza	8	2
(Spain) Juan Gisbert Sr. (Brazil) José Edison Mandarino	9	6
(United Kingdom) John Lloyd (South Africa) Derek Schroder	3	1
(Australia) Roy Emerson (Brazil) Thomaz Koch	6	6

Quarterfinals
(Spain) José Higueras (Spain) Manuel Orantes	6	7	7
(Argentina) Guillermo Vilas (Argentina) Tito Vázquez	2	9	5
(Australia) Dick Crealy (Egypt) Ismail El Shafei	7	3	6
(India) Anand Amritraj (India) Vijay Amritraj	5	6	3
(Mexico) Marcello Lara (Spain) Antonio Muñoz	6	6
(France) Georges Goven (France) François Jauffret	3	2
(Spain) Juan Gisbert Sr. (Brazil) José Edison Mandarino	2	6	4
(Australia) Roy Emerson (Brazil) Thomaz Koch	6	3	6

Semifinals
(Spain) José Higueras (Spain) Manuel Orantes	3	7	6
(Australia) Dick Crealy (Egypt) Ismail El Shafei	6	5	3
(Mexico) Marcello Lara (Spain) Antonio Muñoz	8	5	5
(Australia) Roy Emerson (Brazil) Thomaz Koch	6	7	7

Final
(Spain) José Higueras (Spain) Manuel Orantes	7	0	6	9
(Australia) Roy Emerson (Brazil) Thomaz Koch	5	6	1	8
