= 1976 Suisse Open Gstaad =

- Date: 4–11 July
- Edition: 31st
- Category: Grand Prix
- Draw: 48S / 24D
- Prize money: $75,000
- Surface: Clay / outdoor
- Location: Gstaad, Switzerland

Champions

Singles
- (Mexico) Raúl Ramírez

Doubles
- (West Germany) Jürgen Fassbender / (West Germany) Hans-Jürgen Pohmann
- Suisse Open Gstaad

The 1976 Suisse Open Gstaad was a men's tennis tournament played on outdoor clay courts in Gstaad, Switzerland. It was the 31st edition of the tournament and was held from 4 July through 11 July 1976. The tournament was part of the Grand Prix tennis circuit. Raúl Ramírez won the singles title.

== Finals ==
=== Singles ===
(Mexico) Raúl Ramírez defeated (Italy) Adriano Panatta 7–5, 6–7, 6–1, 6–3

- It was Ramírez 3rd singles title of the year and the 10th of his career.

=== Doubles ===
(West Germany) Jürgen Fassbender / (West Germany) Hans-Jürgen Pohmann defeated (Italy) Paolo Bertolucci / (Italy) Adriano Panatta 7–5, 6–3, 6–3
