= Larry Turville =

American tennis player (1949–2020)

- Full name: Lawrence Canfield Turville
- Country (sports): United States
- Born: June 4, 1949 (age 77) St. Petersburg, Florida
- Height: 6 ft 7 in (201 cm)
- Plays: Right-handed

Singles
- Career record: 4–15

Grand Slam singles results
- US Open: 1R (1969)

Doubles
- Career record: 2–10

Grand Slam doubles results
- Wimbledon: 1R (1975)

Grand Slam mixed doubles results
- French Open: 2R (1979)

Lawrence Canfield Turville (June 4, 1949 – October 10, 2020) was an American professional tennis player and college coach.

Turville, raised in St. Petersburg, Florida, was the son of Edward Turville, a non playing captain of the U.S. Davis Cup team during the early 1970s. The top ranked 18s player in Florida, Turville played collegiate tennis for Georgia Tech and earned All-American honors in 1970, reaching the fourth round of the NCAA championships. In 1971 he set up a series of satellite tournaments in Florida with his friend Armistead Neely, which were known as the World Association of Tennis Champions (WATCH) Circuit. His professional career included doubles main draw appearances at the French Open and Wimbledon. In 1979 he began an 18-year long reign as the Rice University men's head coach.
