= 1976 Agfa Colour Cup – Doubles =

Doubles
- 1976 Agfa Colour Cup

Final
- Champion: (Poland) Wojciech Fibak (West Germany) Karl Meiler
- Runner-up: (Australia) Bob Carmichael (South Africa) Ray Moore
- Score: 6–4, 4–6, 6–4

Details
- Draw: 24
- Seeds: 2

Events
Singles	Doubles
- Düsseldorf Grand Prix

The 1976 Agfa Colour Cup – Doubles was an event of the 1976 Agfa Colour Cup tennis tournament and was played on outdoor clay courts at the Rochusclub in Düsseldorf, West Germany, between 26 May and 4 June 1976. The draw consisted of 24 teams and two of them were seeded. François Jauffret and Jan Kodeš were the defending Agfa Colour Cup doubles champions but did not participate in this edition. The first-seeded team of Wojciech Fibak and Karl Meiler won the doubles title after a win in the final against unseeded pairing Bob Carmichael and Ray Moore, 6–4, 4–6, 6–4.

== Seeds ==
1. (Poland) Wojciech Fibak / (West Germany) Karl Meiler (Champions)
2. (Australia) Dick Crealy / (Spain) Juan Gisbert (Semifinals)

== Draw ==
Key

- Q = Qualifier
- WC = Wild card
- LL = Lucky loser
- Alt = Alternate
- ITF = ITF entry
- PR = Protected ranking
- SR = Special ranking
- SE = Special exempt
- JE = Junior exempt
- JR = Junior Accelerator Programme entrant
- CO = College Accelerator Programme entrant
- NG = Next Gen Accelerator Program entrant
- w/o = Walkover
- r = Retired
- d = Defaulted

=== Finals ===
Semifinals
1	(Poland) Wojciech Fibak (West Germany) Karl Meiler	6	6
(Sweden) Kjell Johansson (Hungary) Balázs Taróczy	3	4
(Australia) Bob Carmichael (South Africa) Raymond Moore	4	6	6
2	(Australia) Dick Crealy (Spain) Juan Gisbert	6	3	4

Final
1	(Poland) Wojciech Fibak (West Germany) Karl Meiler	6	4	6
(Australia) Bob Carmichael (South Africa) Raymond Moore	4	6	4

=== Top half ===
First Round
(West Germany) Ulrich Pinner (West Germany) Werner Zirngibl	6	6
(France) Jean-François Caujolle (France) Patrick Proisy	3	0
(United Kingdom) Gerald Battrick (Czechoslovakia) Pavel Huťka	6	6
(West Germany) Klaus Eberhard (West Germany) Frank Gebert	3	4
(Sweden) Kjell Johansson (Hungary) Balázs Taróczy	6	6
(Chile) Jaime Fillol (Chile) Álvaro Fillol	4	3
(Sweden) Birger Andersson (Sweden) Jan-Eric Palm	2	5
(Hungary) Szabolcs Baranyi (Hungary) Róbert Machán	6	7

Second Round
1	(Poland) Wojciech Fibak (West Germany) Karl Meiler	7	6
(West Germany) Ulrich Pinner (West Germany) Werner Zirngibl	5	1
(Colombia) Iván Molina (Colombia) Jairo Velasco Sr.	3	7	6
(United Kingdom) Gerald Battrick (Czechoslovakia) Pavel Huťka	6	5	2
(India) Anand Amritraj (Czechoslovakia) Jiří Hřebec	6	3
(Sweden) Kjell Johansson (Hungary) Balázs Taróczy	7	6
(Spain) José Higueras (Spain) Antonio Munoz	6	6
(Hungary) Szabolcs Baranyi (Hungary) Róbert Machán	4	4

Quarterfinals
1	(Poland) Wojciech Fibak (West Germany) Karl Meiler	6	5	6
(Colombia) Iván Molina (Colombia) Jairo Velasco Sr.	2	7	4
(Sweden) Kjell Johansson (Hungary) Balázs Taróczy	6	7
(Spain) José Higueras (Spain) Antonio Munoz	4	6

Semifinals
1	(Poland) Wojciech Fibak (West Germany) Karl Meiler	6	6
(Sweden) Kjell Johansson (Hungary) Balázs Taróczy	3	4

=== Bottom half ===
First Round
(Greece) Nicolas Kelaidis (Belgium) Bernard Mignot	7	6	0
(United States) Mike Cahill (United States) Tim Gullikson	6	7	6
(West Germany) Rolf Gehring (West Germany) Ulrich Marten	6	4	3
(India) Sashi Menon (Serbia) Nikola Špear	1	6	6
(South Africa) Pat Cramer (Australia) Barry Phillips-Moore	7	5	4
(South Africa) Byron Bertram (South Africa) John Yuill	6	7	6
(Sweden) Ove Bengtson (Sweden) Rolf Norberg	4	3
2	(Australia) Dick Crealy (Spain) Juan Gisbert	6	6

Second Round
(United States) Mike Cahill (United States) Tim Gullikson	6	7
(United States) John Andrews (Australia) Colin Dibley	3	6
(India) Sashi Menon (Serbia) Nikola Špear	5	3
(Australia) Bob Carmichael (South Africa) Raymond Moore	7	6
(South Africa) Byron Bertram (South Africa) John Yuill	1	6
(Egypt) Ismail El Shafei (New Zealand) Brian Fairlie	6	7
(Czechoslovakia) František Pála (Czechoslovakia) Vladimír Zedník	2	4
2	(Australia) Dick Crealy (Spain) Juan Gisbert	6	6

Quarterfinals
(United States) Mike Cahill (United States) Tim Gullikson	3	3
(Australia) Bob Carmichael (South Africa) Raymond Moore	6	6
(Egypt) Ismail El Shafei (New Zealand) Brian Fairlie	6	4	4
2	(Australia) Dick Crealy (Spain) Juan Gisbert	3	6	6

Semifinals
(Australia) Bob Carmichael (South Africa) Raymond Moore	4	6	6
2	(Australia) Dick Crealy (Spain) Juan Gisbert	6	3	4
