= 1976 Agfa Colour Cup – Singles =

Singles
- 1976 Agfa Colour Cup

Final
- Champion: (Sweden) Björn Borg
- Runner-up: (Spain) Manuel Orantes
- Score: 6–2, 6–2, 6–0

Details
- Draw: 48
- Seeds: 4

Events
Singles	Doubles
- Düsseldorf Grand Prix

The 1976 Agfa Colour Cup – Singles was an event of the 1976 Agfa Colour Cup tennis tournament and was played on outdoor clay courts at the Rochusclub in Düsseldorf, West Germany, between 26 May and 4 June 1976. The draw comprised 48 players and 4 of them were seeded. Fourth-seeded Jaime Fillol was the defending Agfa Colour Cup singles champion but lost in the semifinals to Manuel Orantes. First-seeded Björn Borg won the singles title after a win in the final against second-seeded Orantes, 6–2, 6–2, 6–0.

== Seeds ==
1. (Sweden) Björn Borg (champion)
2. (Spain) Manuel Orantes (final)
3. (withdrew)
4. (Chile) Jaime Fillol (semifinals)

Click on the seed number of a player to go to their draw section.

== Draw ==
Key

- Q = Qualifier
- WC = Wild card
- LL = Lucky loser
- Alt = Alternate
- ITF = ITF entry
- PR = Protected ranking
- SR = Special ranking
- SE = Special exempt
- JE = Junior exempt
- JR = Junior Accelerator Programme entrant
- CO = College Accelerator Programme entrant
- NG = Next Gen Accelerator Program entrant
- w/o = Walkover
- r = Retired
- d = Defaulted

=== Finals ===
Quarterfinals
1	(Sweden) Björn Borg	6	6
(South Africa) Byron Bertram	4	4
(Spain) José Higueras	6	7
(Australia) Dick Crealy	3	6
(Poland) Wojciech Fibak	4	5
4	(Chile) Jaime Fillol	6	7
(Sweden) Kjell Johansson	2	3
2	(Spain) Manuel Orantes	6	6

Semifinals
1	(Sweden) Björn Borg	6	6
(Spain) José Higueras	1	3
4	(Chile) Jaime Fillol	6	4
2	(Spain) Manuel Orantes	7	6

Final
1	(Sweden) Björn Borg	6	6	6
2	(Spain) Manuel Orantes	2	2	0

=== Top half ===
==== Section 1 ====
First Round
Q	(Czech Republic) Pavel Huťka	4	6	6
LL	(Belgium) Bernard Mignot	6	4	4
(Australia) Colin Dibley	4	2
(Spain) Antonio Munoz	6	6
(India) Sashi Menon	2	6	6
LL	(Australia) John James	6	3	3
(Germany) Attila Korpás	3	3
(United Kingdom) Gerald Battrick	6	6

Second Round
1	(Sweden) Björn Borg	6	6
Q	(Czech Republic) Pavel Huťka	3	4
Q	(Czech Republic) Vladimír Zedník	7	4	6
(Spain) Antonio Munoz	6	6	7
(Spain) Juan Gisbert Sr.	7	6
(India) Sashi Menon	6	2
(South Africa) Byron Bertram	6	6
(United Kingdom) Gerald Battrick	1	4

Third Round
1	(Sweden) Björn Borg	6	6
(Spain) Antonio Munoz	4	2
(Spain) Juan Gisbert Sr.	0	6	3
(South Africa) Byron Bertram	6	3	6

Quarterfinals
1	(Sweden) Björn Borg	6	6
(South Africa) Byron Bertram	4	4

==== Section 2 ====
First Round
LL	(Sweden) Ove Bengtson	3	1
(Czech Republic) František Pála	6	6
(South Africa) Raymond Moore	7	3	0
(Spain) José Higueras	6	6	6
(France) Patrick Proisy	6	6
(Germany) Ulrich Marten	3	3
(Australia) Dick Crealy	6	3	6
(Australia) Bob Carmichael	2	6	3

Second Round
(Czech Republic) František Pála	6	6
(United States) Mike Cahill	2	2
Q	(Hungary) Szabolcs Baranyi	2	5
(Spain) José Higueras	6	7
(France) Patrick Proisy	6	6	6
Q	(Germany) Klaus Eberhard	2	7	2
(Australia) Dick Crealy	4	7	6
(India) Anand Amritraj	6	5	4

Third Round
(Czech Republic) František Pála	4	4
(Spain) José Higueras	6	6
(France) Patrick Proisy	3	6	0
(Australia) Dick Crealy	6	3	6

Quarterfinals
(Spain) José Higueras	6	7
(Australia) Dick Crealy	3	6

=== Bottom half ===
==== Section 3 ====
First Round
(South Africa) Pat Cramer	5	1
(France) Jean-François Caujolle	7	6
LL	(Sweden) Rolf Norberg	6	6
(Austria) Hans Kary	2	1
(Germany) Ulrich Pinner	6	6
Q	(Sweden) Birger Andersson	3	3
(Hungary) Balázs Taróczy	6	4
(Czech Republic) Jiří Hřebec	7	6

Second Round
(France) Jean-François Caujolle	3	6	3
(Australia) Barry Phillips-Moore	6	1	6
LL	(Sweden) Rolf Norberg	1	3
(Poland) Wojciech Fibak	6	6
Q	(Hungary) Róbert Machán	4	4
(Germany) Ulrich Pinner	6	6
(Czech Republic) Jiří Hřebec	2	1
4	(Chile) Jaime Fillol	6	6

Third Round
(Australia) Barry Phillips-Moore	1	1
(Poland) Wojciech Fibak	6	6
(Germany) Ulrich Pinner	6	3
4	(Chile) Jaime Fillol	7	6

Quarterfinals
(Poland) Wojciech Fibak	4	5
4	(Chile) Jaime Fillol	6	7

==== Section 4 ====
First Round
(Sweden) Kjell Johansson	7	6
(Serbia) Nikola Špear	6	4
(Egypt) Ismail El Shafei	6	7
(Colombia) Iván Molina	4	5
(Germany) Werner Zirngibl	3	6	6
LL	(Sweden) Jan-Eric Palm	6	2	2
(New Zealand) Brian Fairlie	7	6
(South Africa) John Yuill	6	3

Second Round
(Germany) Rolf Gehring	1	4
(Sweden) Kjell Johansson	6	6
(Colombia) Jairo Velasco Sr.	3	6	6
(Egypt) Ismail El Shafei	6	4	3
(United States) John Andrews	3	3
(Germany) Werner Zirngibl	6	6
(New Zealand) Brian Fairlie	1	2
2	(Spain) Manuel Orantes	6	6

Third Round
(Sweden) Kjell Johansson	7	6
(Colombia) Jairo Velasco Sr.	6	2
(Germany) Werner Zirngibl	0	1
2	(Spain) Manuel Orantes	6	6

Quarterfinals
(Sweden) Kjell Johansson	2	3
2	(Spain) Manuel Orantes	6	6
