= 1976 Agfa Colour Cup =

- Date: 24–30 May
- Edition: 7th
- Category: Grand Prix (Two Star)
- Draw: 48S / 24D
- Prize money: $50,000
- Surface: Clay / outdoor
- Location: Düsseldorf, West Germany
- Venue: Rochusclub

Champions

Singles
- (Sweden) Björn Borg

Doubles
- (Poland) Wojciech Fibak / (West Germany) Karl Meiler
- Düsseldorf Grand Prix

The 1976 Agfa Colour Cup was a men's Grand Prix tennis circuit tournament held at the Rochusclub in Düsseldorf, West Germany and played on outdoor clay courts. It was the seventh edition of the tournament and was held from 24 May until 30 May 1976. First-seeded Björn Borg won the singles title.

== Finals ==
=== Singles ===
(Sweden) Björn Borg defeated (Spain) Manuel Orantes 6–2, 6–2, 6–0

- It was Borg's 4th singles title of the year and the 17th of his career.

=== Doubles ===
(Poland) Wojciech Fibak / (West Germany) Karl Meiler defeated (Australia) Bob Carmichael / (South Africa) Ray Moore 6–4, 4–6, 6–4
