= Düsseldorf Open =

Düsseldorf Open may refer to:

- Düsseldorf Open (ATP Tour)
- Düsseldorf Open (WTA Tour)
