= 1975 Düsseldorf Grand Prix =

- Date: 26 May – 1 June
- Edition: 6th
- Category: Grand Prix (Grade B)
- Draw: 32S / 16D
- Prize money: $50,000
- Surface: Clay / outdoor
- Location: Düsseldorf, West Germany
- Venue: Rochusclub

Champions

Singles
- (Chile) Jaime Fillol

Doubles
- (France) François Jauffret / (Czechoslovakia) Jan Kodeš
- Düsseldorf Grand Prix

The 1975 Düsseldorf Grand Prix, also known by its sponsored name Agfa Colour Cup, was a men's Grand Prix tennis circuit tournament held at the Rochusclub in Düsseldorf, West Germany and played on outdoor clay courts. It was the sixth edition of the tournament and was held from 26 May though 1 June 1975. Second-seeded Jaime Fillol won the singles title.

== Finals ==
=== Singles ===
(Chile) Jaime Fillol defeated (Czechoslovakia) Jan Kodeš 6–4, 1–6, 6–0, 7–5

- It was Fillol's only singles title of the year and the 6th of his career.

=== Doubles ===
(France) François Jauffret / (France) Jan Kodeš defeated (West Germany) Harald Elschenbroich / (Austria) Hans Kary 6–2, 6–3
