= WTA Düsseldorf Open =

Düsseldorf International Düsseldorf Open

Defunct tennis tournament
- Founded: 1906
- Abolished: 1974
- Location: Düsseldorf, Germany
- Venue: Rochusclub Düsseldorfer Tennisclub
- Category: ILTF (1914-1972); WTA Tour (1973); ILTF Independent Tour (1974)
- Surface: Clay / outdoor

The Düsseldorf Open was a women's clay court tennis tournament founded as a combined men's and women's tournament in 1905 called the Düsseldorf International or Internationale Düsseldorf. It remained a joint event until 1969 and was held annually at the Rochusclub Düsseldorfer Tennisclub in Düsseldorf, Germany until 1974.

== History ==
In 1898 the Rochusclub Düsseldorfer Tennisclub was founded. In 1905 the club staged the first Internationale Düsseldorf tournament. In 1906 a women's event was added to the schedule. In 1929 the Rochusclub moved to a new location where it remains today. It was held annually in Düsseldorf, Germany until 1974. The combined event was part of the Deutscher Lawn Tennis Bund (f.1902) circuit from inception until 1913. In 1914 it became part of the new ILTF Circuit until 1969. In 1970 the men's event was re branded as the Düsseldorf Grand Prix and became part of the Grand Prix tennis circuit. The women's event remained a part of the ILTF Circuit under the original name Dusseldorf International. In 1973 the women's event was branded as the Düsseldorf Open and was part of the 1973 WTA Tour for one edition only, before it returned as an event on the ILTF Independent Tour. The women's event ended in 1974 and the men's tournament was discontinued in 1977.

The Düsseldorf Open was a women's professional tennis tournament held for one year, in 1973, in Düsseldorf, West Germany. Its one-year on the WTA Tour saw a home player, Helga Masthoff, winning in the women's singles, whilst she and Heide Orth reached a women's doubles final that was not played.

== Finals ==
=== Singles ===
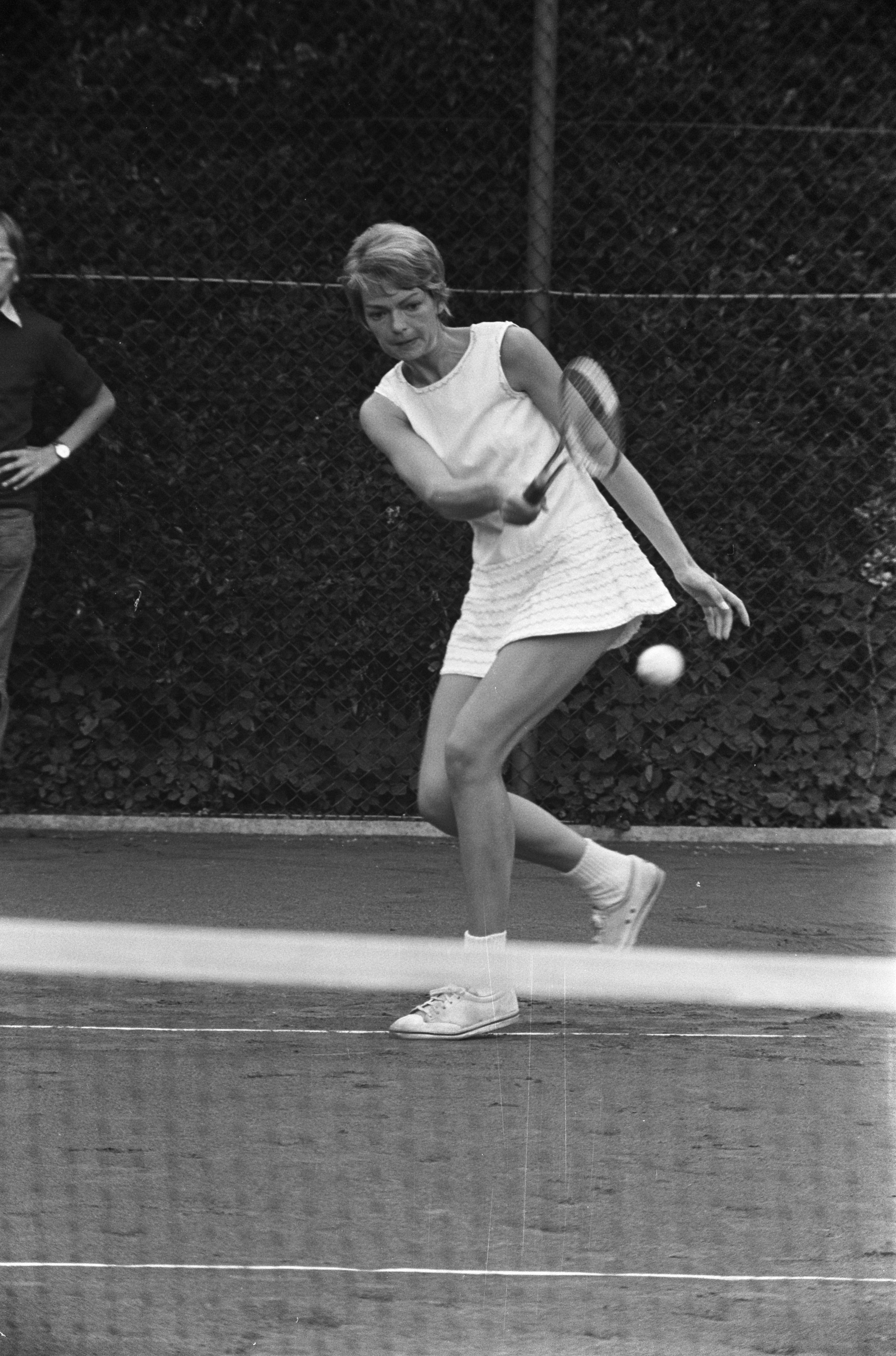
Helga Masthoff in 1973 won 4 singles titles.

(incomplete roll)

Düsseldorf International
Year	Winners	Runners-up	Score
1906	(Germany) Lucie Bergmann	(Germany) Elspeth Holzapfel	6–1, 6–4
1908	(Germany) Dagmar von Krohn	(Germany) M. Holzapfel	6–1, 6–0
1912	(Germany) Anita Heimann Lent	(Germany) Maria Deus	6–3, 6–0
1928	(Germany) Cilly Aussem	(United States) Elizabeth Ryan	7–5, 6–4
1929	(Germany) Hilde Krahwinkel	(Germany) Irma Kallmeyer	6–4, 6–1
1935	(Germany) Marie Luise Horn	(Belgium) Nelly Adamson	1–6, 6–4, 6–1
1937	(Italy) Anneliese Ullstein	(Kingdom of Yugoslavia) Hella Kovac	6–1, 6–3
1938	(United States) Gracyn Wheeler	(Germany) Rosl Kraus	6–3, 2–6, 7–5
1939	(Czechoslovakia) Hilda Walterová	(Kingdom of Yugoslavia) Alice Florian	6–1, 6–3
1952	(Australia) Thelma Coyne Long	(United Kingdom) Joan Curry	6–0, 6–1
1950	(Argentina) Mary Terán de Weiss	(West Germany) Inge Pohmann	6-2, 8-6
1955	(United States) Doris Hart	(West Germany) Erika Vollmer	6-2, 6-1
1956	(United States) Shirley Fry	(Bermuda) Heather Nicholls Brewer	6-1, 13-11
1959	(United States) Karol Fageros	(West Germany) Renate Ostermann	6-8, 6-1, 6-1
1960	(Brazil) Maria Bueno	(West Germany) Edda Buding	6-1, 6-1
1961	(Australia) Lesley Turner	(West Germany) Renate Ostermann	6-3, 6-2
1962	(Australia) Lesley Turner (2)	(Australia) Jan Lehane	6-1, 6-2
1963	(Australia) Margaret Smith	(Australia) Lesley Turner	6-3, 6-2
1964	(Australia) Margaret Smith (2)	(Australia) Lesley Turner	1-6, 6-1, 6-4
↓ Open era ↓
1969	(West Germany) Helga Niessen	(West Germany) Edda Buding	6–1, 8–6
1970	(West Germany) Helga Hosl	(West Germany) Helga Niessen	7–5, 6–4
1971	(West Germany) Helga Masthoff (2)	(Netherlands) Betty Stöve	4–6, 6–3, 6–3
1972	(South Africa) Pat Walkden Pretorius	(West Germany) Katja Ebbinghaus	6–2, 1–6, 6–3
↓ WTA Tour ↓
1973	(West Germany) Helga Masthoff (3)	(Australia) Evonne Goolagong	6–4, 6–4
↓ ILTF Independent Tour ↓
1974	(West Germany) Katja Ebbinghaus	(West Germany) Helga Masthoff	6–2, 6–1
1975	(West Germany) Helga Masthoff (4)	(Australia) Evonne Goolagong	6–4, 6–4

=== Doubles ===
Year	Champions	Score
1973	(Australia) Evonne Goolagong / (Australia) Janet Young vs. (West Germany) Helga Masthoff / (West Germany) Heide Orth	Divided (not competed)

== See also ==
- Düsseldorf Grand Prix
- ATP Düsseldorf Open
