= Jan Kodeš =

Czech tennis player (born 1946)

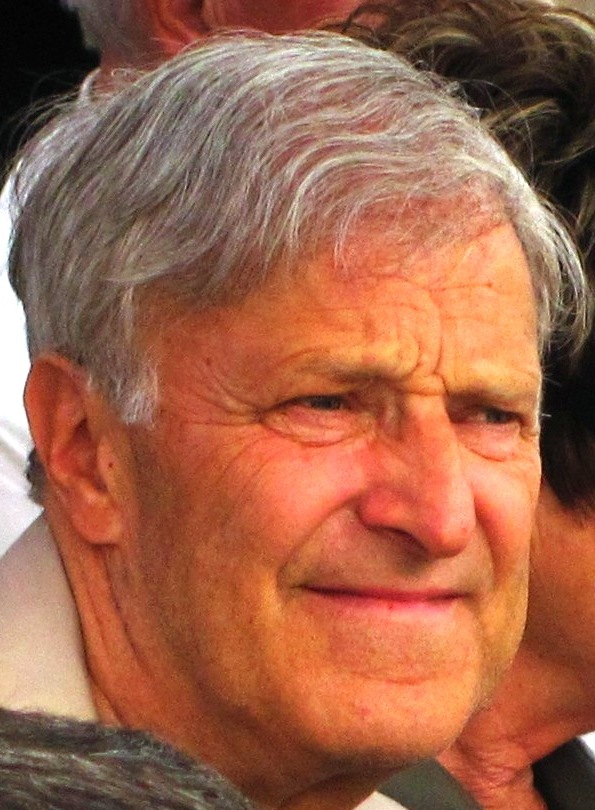
- Country (sports): Czechoslovakia
- Residence: Prague, Czech Republic
- Born: 1 March 1946 (age 80) Prague, Czechoslovakia
- Height: 1.75 m (5 ft 9 in)
- Turned pro: 1968 (amateur from 1966)
- Retired: 1983
- Plays: Right-handed (one-handed backhand)
- Prize money: $693,197
- Int. Tennis HoF: 1990 (member page)

Singles
- Career record: 630–341 in pre Open-Era & Open Era
- Career titles: 9
- Highest ranking: No. 5 (13 September 1973)

Grand Slam singles results
- French Open: W (1970, 1971)
- Wimbledon: W (1973)
- US Open: F (1971, 1973)

Other tournaments
- Tour Finals: RR (1970, 1971, 1972, 1973)
- WCT Finals: SF (1974)

Doubles
- Career record: 313-183
- Career titles: 17
- Highest ranking: No. 12 (21 May 1979)

Grand Slam doubles results
- French Open: F (1977)

Jan Kodeš (born 1 March 1946) is a Czech former professional tennis player. A three-time major singles champion, Kodeš was one of the premier players in the early 1970s.

Kodeš's greatest success was achieved on the clay courts of the French Open. He won the singles title in 1970 French Open beating Željko Franulović in straight sets in the final. He won the 1971 French Open over Ilie Năstase in the final in four sets, his "tireless running and gifted anticipation" proving too much for the Romanian. He also won Wimbledon on grass courts in 1973, beating Alex Metreveli in the final in straight sets, although the tournament was largely boycotted by top players that year in a show of solidarity over the ban of Nikola Pilić by the International Lawn Tennis Federation (ILTF).

Kodeš never played at the Australian Open, but was twice the runner-up at the US Open, in 1971 to Stan Smith and 1973 to John Newcombe. Kodeš reached his highest ATP ranking of world No. 5 in September 1973. During the Open Era, he won nine top-level singles titles and 17 doubles titles.

Kodeš was inducted into the International Tennis Hall of Fame in 1990. In 2013, he received the Czech Fair Play Award from the Czech Olympic Committee. He is an economics graduate of the Prague University.

== Career ==
Kodeš began his career just before the start of the open era. He showed early promise at the French Open, reaching the fourth round in both 1967 and 1969.

Kodeš won his first professional tournament at the St Petersburg open, beating Joaquin Loyo Mayo in the final. Kodeš went into the 1970 French open seeded seventh and enjoyed comfortable early round victories, dropping just 4 games in his first round match and seven games in his second. He defeated fellow Czech Koudelka in the third round before beating Romania tenth seed Titian’s in five sets to advance to the quarter-finals. Modes beat the unseeded Italian Martin Mulligan in straight sets to set up a quarter final tie against George’s Goven. Kodeš won in a five set thriller, coming back from two sets to one down. He beat Zeljko Franulovic in straight sets in the final to win his first Grand Slam.

Kodeš won the 1971 Catania Open, beating George's Goven in the final. 1971 saw Kodeš attempt to defend his French Open title. He went into the tournament as stop seed and advanced through the first three rounds in convincing fashion, not dropping a set. In the fourth round he had to come from 2 sets to 1 down to beat Frenchman Jauffret in five sets. He beat another Frenchman, Patrick Proisey in the quarter finals. His semi-final match saw a repeat of the previous year’s final as Kordes again beat Franulovic, this time in straight sets. He played third seed Ilie Nastase in the final. He won the first two sets, and despite losing the third, went on to win the match in four sets to secure a second straight French Open title. Fore the second consecutive year, Kodeš exited Wimbledon at the first round stage. However, he was much more successful at the US Open. Kodeš upset top seed John Newcombe in the first round, winning in four sets. After a five set battle against Barthes of France in the second round, he won his next two games in straight sets to advance to the quarter finals. He beat American Frank Froehling in straight sets to advance to face Arthur Ashe in the semis, where he beat the American in five sets to set up a clash against second seed Stan Smith in the final. After Kodeš won the first set, Smith fought back to win in four sets.

Kodeš won the Barcelona Open to secure yet another clay court title. Kodeš was unable to defend his French Open title for a third time, losing in the quarter finals against Patrick Proisy. Kodeš enjoyed a successful run at Wimbledon, reaching the quarter finals for the first time. Seeded fifth, he lost to top seed Stan Smith in the semi-finals, going out in four sets.

1973 saw Kodeš again fall at the quarter finals for stage at the French Open. He beat Jovanovic in the fourth round in five sets after convincing wins in the earlier rounds. However, he suffered a defeat to unseeded American Tom Gorman in the quarter finals, losing in four sets. With several players boycotting Wimbledon in 1973, Kodeš started he tournament as second seed. He made light work of the early rounds. In the quarter finals he faced Indian Vijay Amritraj, coming from two sets to one down to win a five set epic. This set up a semi-final against Roger Taylor, the last British player in the competition. Kodeš won a long match in five sets.in the final Modes secured a convincing win against Alex Metreveli, winning in straight sets to secure his first Wimbledon title and third Major title. Kodeš followed up his Wimbledon triumph by reaching his second Us Open title. He secured a five set victory over Nikola Pilic in the quarter finals before beating Stan Smith to avenge his previous final defeat against the American. In the final he faced the Australian John Newcombe. Kodeš took a two sets to one lead, Newcombe won the last two sets, meaning Kodeš had to settle for finishing runner up.

1974 saw a decline in Kodeš's performance at the slams. After reaching at least the quarter finals of seven of the last nine slams he had played, Kodeš went out in 5e fourth round of the French Open. He reached the quarter finals of Wimbledon but lost in five sets against Jimmy Connors. 1975 saw Kodeš fail to make it to the quarter finals stage of any of the slams, the first time this had happened since 1969. Despite this, he secured victory against Adriano Panatta at the Madrid Open. He won the Swiss Indoor Championships in 1976, beating fellow Czech Jiri Hrebec in the final. He reached the quarter finals of the 1976 US Open despite not being seeded for the tournament. He beat Arthur Ashe in the second round and continued to progress through the competition until he met Jimmy Connors in the quarter finals. Kodeš was beaten convincingly in straight sets.

In 1977 Kodeš was runner up with Wojciech Fibak in the doubles tournament at the French Open. The pair won the Barcelona Open together shortly afterwards.

Kodeš's final Grand Slam appearance came at 1981 Wimbledon, where he went out in the first round.

The final tournament victory of Kodeš career came in the Hilversum doubles in 1982, partnered by fellow Czech Tomas Smid. The last final of his career came the following year at the same tournament.

Kodeš retired from tennis in 1983.

== Davis Cup ==
Kodeš had a strong record with Czech Republic in the Davis Cup. Between 1964 and 1980, he had a 39-19 winning record in singles and 21-15 in doubles. He was part of the Czech team which finished runners up in 1975, heifer finally winning the tournament in 1980. Kodeš was the Czechoslovak team captain between 1982 and 1987.

== Career statistics ==
The table for open era finals below does not include victories and final participation in tournaments from 1966 to 1969, such as victories in international championships and tournaments in Santiago, Viña del Mar, São Paulo, Lyon, Cannes, Luxembourg, St. Petersburg (USA), Beirut, Zaragoza, Split, Varna, Plovdiv, Paris (Racing Club) and three times in the MM CSSR in Bratislava. In doubles with Javorsky in Bratislava, then with Jan Kukal, he won tournaments in Lyon, Hilversum, Macon (USA), Pittsburgh, Caracas, Istanbul, Bratislava, Beirut and Split. With Pala in Luxembourg and Zaragoza. With Rodriguez in Viña del Mar, Chile. In all these tournaments or championships, the starting field was always at least 32 players, like today's ATP tour tournaments, but they are not listed in the ATP Tour yearbooks because the ATP Tour did not exist at that time and did not publish publications.

In the book written by Petr Kolář and Jan Kodeš, "A Journey to Glory from behind the Iron Curtain", there are 25 singles wins, 27 appearances in finals, 32 doubles wins and 29 appearances in doubles finals. He participated in the first Grand Prix "Masters" tournaments (now ATP Finals) from 1970-1974 (Tokyo 1970, Paris 1971, Barcelona 1972, Boston 1973 and Dallas 1974).

=== Grand Slam finals: 5 (3 titles / 2 runner-ups) ===
Result	Year	Championship	Surface	Opponent	Score
Win	1970	French Open	Clay	(Socialist Federal Republic of Yugoslavia) Željko Franulović	6–2, 6–4, 6–0
Win	1971	French Open (2)	Clay	(Romania) Ilie Năstase	8–6, 6–2, 2–6, 7–5
Loss	1971	US Open	Grass	(United States) Stan Smith	6–3, 3–6, 2–6, 6–7^{(3–5)}
Win	1973	Wimbledon	Grass	(Soviet Union) Alex Metreveli	6–1, 9–8^{(7–5)}, 6–3
Loss	1973	US Open (2)	Grass	(Australia) John Newcombe	4–6, 6–1, 6–4, 2–6, 3–6

=== Grand Slam singles performance timeline ===
Key
W	F	SF	QF	#R	RR	Q#	DNQ	A	NH

(W) winner; (F) finalist; (SF) semifinalist; (QF) quarterfinalist; (#R) rounds 4, 3, 2, 1; (RR) round-robin stage; (Q#) qualification round; (DNQ) did not qualify; (A) absent; (NH) not held; (SR) strike rate (events won / competed); (W–L) win–loss record.

Tournament	1966	1967	1968	1969	1970	1971	1972	1973	1974	1975	1976	1977	1978	1979	1980	1981	SR	W–L	Win %
Australian Open	Absent																0 / 0	0–0	–
French Open	2R	4R	1R^{[a]}	4R	W	W	QF	QF	4R	4R	3R	4R	3R	2R	2R	1R	2 / 16	43–13	76.79
Wimbledon	1R	1R	1R	2R	1R	1R	SF	W	QF	2R	A	1R	1R	1R	2R	1R	1 / 15	19–14	57.58
US Open	A	A	A	2R	A	F	2R	F	4R	4R	QF	3R	A	2R	A	A	0 / 9	27–9	75.00
Win–loss	1–2	3–2	0–1	5–3	7–1	13–2	9–3	17–2	10–3	7–3	6–2	5–3	2–2	2–3	2–2	0–2	3 / 40	89–36	71.20

^{a} 1968 French Open counts as 0 wins, 0 losses. Fernando Gentil received a walkover in the first round, after Kodeš withdrew, does not count as a Kodeš loss (nor a Gentil win).

== Open Era finals ==
=== Singles: 28 (9 titles / 19 runner-ups) ===
Result	W-L	Date	Tournament	Surface	Opponent	Score
Win	1–0	Apr 1970	St. Petersburg, US	Clay	(Mexico) Joaquín Loyo-Mayo	6–3, 6–3, 6–3
Win	2–0	Jun 1970	French Open, Paris	Clay	(Socialist Federal Republic of Yugoslavia) Željko Franulović	6–2, 6–4, 6–0
Loss	2–1	Apr 1970	Rome, Italy	Clay	(Romania) Ilie Năstase	3–6, 6–1, 3–6, 6–8
Loss	2–2	Apr 1971	Nice, France	Clay	(Romania) Ilie Năstase	8–10, 9–11, 1–6
Win	3–2	Apr 1971	Catania, Italy	Clay	(France) Georges Goven	6–3, 6–0, 6–2
Loss	3–3	May 1971	Rome WCT, Italy	Clay	(Australia) Rod Laver	5–7, 3–6, 3–6
Win	4–3	Jun 1971	French Open, Paris	Clay	(Romania) Ilie Năstase	8–6, 6–2, 2–6, 7–5
Loss	4–4	Sep 1971	US Open, New York	Grass	(United States) Stan Smith	6–3, 3–6, 2–6, 6–7
Loss	4–5	Nov 1971	Stockholm WCT, Sweden	Hard (i)	(United States) Arthur Ashe	1–6, 6–3, 2–6, 6–1, 4–6
Loss	4–6	Apr 1972	Nice, France	Clay	(Romania) Ilie Năstase	0–6, 4–6, 3–6
Loss	4–7	May 1972	Rome, Italy	Clay	(Spain) Manuel Orantes	6–4, 1–6, 5–7, 2–6
Win	5–7	Oct 1972	Barcelona, Spain	Clay	(Spain) Manuel Orantes	6–3, 6–2, 6–3
Win	6–7	Feb 1973	Cologne, Germany	Carpet (i)	(New Zealand) Brian Fairlie	6–1, 6–3, 6–1
Loss	6–8	Apr 1973	Vancouver, Canada	Carpet (i)	(United States) Tom Gorman	6–3, 2–6, 5–7
Win	7–8	Jul 1973	Wimbledon, London	Grass	(Soviet Union) Alex Metreveli	6–1, 9–8, 6–3
Loss	7–9	Sep 1973	US Open, New York	Grass	(Australia) John Newcombe	4–6, 6–1, 6–4, 2–6, 3–6
Loss	7–10	Oct 1973	Prague, Czechoslovakia	Carpet (i)	(Czechoslovakia) Jiří Hřebec	6–4, 1–6, 6–3, 0–6, 5–7
Loss	7–11	May 1974	Acapulco, Mexico	Carpet (i)	(Netherlands) Tom Okker	2–6, 6–7
Loss	7–12	Mar 1975	Hampton, US	Carpet (i)	(United States) Jimmy Connors	6–3, 3–6, 0–6
Loss	7–13	May 1975	Hamburg, Germany	Clay	(Spain) Manuel Orantes	6–3, 2–6, 2–6, 6–4, 1–6
Loss	7–14	Jun 1975	Düsseldorf, Germany	Clay	(Chile) Jaime Fillol	4–6, 6–1, 0–6, 5–7
Loss	7–15	Jul 1975	Kitzbühel, Austria	Clay	(Italy) Adriano Panatta	6–2, 2–6, 5–7, 4–6
Win	8–15	Oct 1975	Madrid, Spain	Clay	(Italy) Adriano Panatta	6–2, 3–6, 7–6, 6–2
Win	9–15	Mar 1976	Basel, Switzerland	Carpet (i)	(Czechoslovakia) Jiří Hřebec	6–4, 6–2, 6–3
Loss	9–16	Apr 1976	Nice, France	Clay	(Italy) Corrado Barazzutti	2–6, 6–2, 7–5, 6–7, 6–8
Loss	9–17	Jul 1976	Kitzbühel, Austria	Clay	(Spain) Manuel Orantes	6–7, 2–6, 6–7
Loss	9–18	Oct 1976	Aviles, Spain	Clay	(Socialist Federal Republic of Yugoslavia) Željko Franulović	6–7, 1–6, 7–5, 6–7
Loss	9–19	Jul 1977	Kitzbühel, Austria	Clay	(Argentina) Guillermo Vilas	7–5, 2–6, 6–4, 3–6, 2–6

=== Doubles: 39 (17 titles / 22 runner-ups) ===
Result	W-L	Date	Tournament	Surface	Partner	Opponents	Score
Loss	0–1	Jul 1970	Båstad, Sweden	Clay	(Socialist Federal Republic of Yugoslavia) Željko Franulović	(Australia) Dick Crealy (Australia) Allan Stone	2–6, 6–2, 12–12 ret.
Loss	0–2	Aug 1970	Kitzbühel, Austria	Clay	(Socialist Federal Republic of Yugoslavia) Željko Franulović	(Australia) John Alexander (Australia) Phil Dent	8–10, 2–6, 4–6
Loss	0–3	Oct 1970	Phoenix, US	Hard	(United States) Charlie Pasarell	(Australia) Dick Crealy (Australia) Ray Ruffels	6–7, 3–6
Loss	0–4	Nov 1970	Buenos Aires, Argentina	Clay	(Socialist Federal Republic of Yugoslavia) Željko Franulović	(Australia) Bob Carmichael (Australia) Ray Ruffels	5–7, 2–6, 7–5, 7–6, 3–6
Loss	0–5	Mar 1971	Macon, US	Carpet	(Socialist Federal Republic of Yugoslavia) Željko Franulović	(United States) Clark Graebner (Brazil) Thomaz Koch	3–6, 6–7
Loss	0–6	Apr 1971	Catania, Italy	Clay	(Czechoslovakia) Jan Kukal	(France) Pierre Barthès (France) François Jauffret	6–7, 6–2, 3–6
Win	1–6	Aug 1971	Indianapolis, US	Clay	(Socialist Federal Republic of Yugoslavia) Željko Franulović	(United States) Clark Graebner (United States) Erik van Dillen	7–6, 5–7, 6–3
Win	2–6	Apr 1972	Nice, France	Clay	(United States) Stan Smith	(South Africa) Frew McMillan (Romania) Ilie Năstase	6–3, 3–6, 7–5
Win	3–6	Jun 1972	Hamburg, Germany	Clay	(Romania) Ilie Năstase	(South Africa) Bob Hewitt (Romania) Ion Țiriac	4–6, 6–0, 3–6, 6–2, 6–2
Loss	3–7	Aug 1972	Toronto, Canada	Clay	(Czechoslovakia) Jan Kukal	(Romania) Ilie Năstase (Romania) Ion Țiriac	6–7, 3–6
Win	4–7	Sep 1973	Los Angeles, US	Hard	(Czechoslovakia) Vladimír Zedník	(United States) Jimmy Connors (Romania) Ilie Năstase	6–2, 6–4
Win	5–7	Oct 1973	Prague, Czechoslovakia	Mateflex	(Czechoslovakia) Vladimír Zedník	(Hungary) Róbert Machán (Hungary) Balázs Taróczy	7–6, 7–6
Win	6–7	Mar 1974	Palm Desert, US	Hard	(Czechoslovakia) Vladimír Zedník	(South Africa) Raymond Moore (New Zealand) Onny Parun	6–4, 6–4
Win	7–7	Jul 1974	Düsseldorf, Germany	Clay	(Czechoslovakia) Jiří Hřebec	(Japan) Kenichi Hirai (Japan) Toshiro Sakai	6–1, 6–4
Loss	7–8	Feb 1975	Salisbury, US	Carpet	(United Kingdom) Roger Taylor	(United States) Jimmy Connors (Romania) Ilie Năstase	6–7, 2–6
Win	8–8	May 1975	Munich, Germany	Clay	(Poland) Wojciech Fibak	(Czechoslovakia) Milan Holeček (West Germany) Karl Meiler	7–5, 6–3
Loss	8–9	May 1975	Hamburg, Germany	Clay	(Poland) Wojciech Fibak	(Spain) Juan Gisbert Sr. (Spain) Manuel Orantes	3–6, 6–7
Win	9–9	Jun 1975	Düsseldorf, Germany	Clay	(France) François Jauffret	(West Germany) Harald Elschenbroich (Austria) Hans Kary	6–2, 6–3
Loss	9–10	Aug 1975	Toronto, Canada	Hard	(Romania) Ilie Năstase	(South Africa) Cliff Drysdale (South Africa) Raymond Moore	4–6, 7–5, 6–7
Win	10–10	Oct 1975	Madrid, Spain	Clay	(Romania) Ilie Năstase	(Spain) Juan Gisbert Sr. (Spain) Manuel Orantes	6–4, 3–6, 9–7
Win	11–10	Jul 1976	Kitzbühel, Austria	Clay	(Czechoslovakia) Jiří Hřebec	(West Germany) Jürgen Fassbender (West Germany) Hans-Jürgen Pohmann	6–7, 6–2, 6–4
Loss	11–11	Jan 1977	Baltimore, US	Carpet	(Australia) Ross Case	(Romania) Ion Țiriac (Argentina) Guillermo Vilas	3–6, 7–6, 4–6
Win	12–11	Apr 1977	Monte Carlo, Monaco	Clay	(France) François Jauffret	(Poland) Wojciech Fibak (Netherlands) Tom Okker	2–6, 6–3, 6–2
Loss	12–12	Jun 1977	French Open, Paris	Clay	(Poland) Wojciech Fibak	(United States) Brian Gottfried (Mexico) Raúl Ramírez	6–7, 6–4, 3–6, 4–6
Win	13–12	Oct 1977	Barcelona, Spain	Clay	(Poland) Wojciech Fibak	(South Africa) Bob Hewitt (South Africa) Frew McMillan	6–0, 6–4
Loss	13–13	Oct 1977	Vienna, Austria	Carpet	(Poland) Wojciech Fibak	(South Africa) Bob Hewitt (South Africa) Frew McMillan	4–6, 3–6
Loss	13–14	Nov 1977	Oviedo, Spain	Carpet	(Mexico) Raúl Ramírez	(United States) Fred McNair (United States) Sherwood Stewart	3–6, 1–6
Loss	13–15	Feb 1978	Springfield, US	Carpet	(United States) Marty Riessen	(United States) Robert Lutz (United States) Stan Smith	3–6, 3–6
Loss	13–16	Apr 1978	Nice, France	Clay	(Czechoslovakia) Tomáš Šmíd	(France) Patrice Dominguez (France) François Jauffret	4–6, 0–6
Loss	13–17	May 1978	Rome, Italy	Clay	(Czechoslovakia) Tomáš Šmíd	(Paraguay) Víctor Pecci (Chile) Belus Prajoux	7–6, 6–7, 1–6
Win	14–17	Jul 1978	Stuttgart, Germany	Clay	(Czechoslovakia) Tomáš Šmíd	(Brazil) Carlos Kirmayr (Chile) Belus Prajoux	6–3, 7–6
Loss	14–18	Oct 1978	Aix-en-Provence, France	Clay	(Czechoslovakia) Tomáš Šmíd	(Romania) Ion Țiriac (Argentina) Guillermo Vilas	6–7, 1–6
Win	15–18	Oct 1978	Madrid, Spain	Clay	(Poland) Wojciech Fibak	(Czechoslovakia) Pavel Složil (Czechoslovakia) Tomáš Šmíd	6–7, 6–1, 6–2
Win	16–18	May 1979	Hamburg, Germany	Clay	(Czechoslovakia) Tomáš Šmíd	(Australia) Mark Edmondson (Australia) John Marks	6–3, 6–1, 7–6
Loss	16–19	Jul 1979	Hilversum, Netherlands	Clay	(Czechoslovakia) Tomáš Šmíd	(Netherlands) Tom Okker (Hungary) Balázs Taróczy	1–6, 3–6
Loss	16–20	Aug 1979	Indianapolis, US	Clay	(Czechoslovakia) Tomáš Šmíd	(United States) Gene Mayer (United States) John McEnroe	4–6, 6–7
Loss	16–21	Nov 1980	Cologne, Germany	Carpet	(Czechoslovakia) Tomáš Šmíd	(South Africa) Bernard Mitton (Zimbabwe) Andrew Pattison	4–6, 1–6
Win	17–21	Jul 1982	Hilversum, Netherlands	Clay	(Czechoslovakia) Tomáš Šmíd	(Hungary) Balázs Taróczy (Switzerland) Heinz Günthardt	7–6, 6–4
Loss	17–22	Jul 1983	Hilversum, Netherlands	Clay	(Czechoslovakia) Tomáš Šmíd	(Switzerland) Heinz Günthardt (Hungary) Balázs Taróczy	6–3, 2–6, 3–6
