= Düsseldorf Grand Prix =

Defunct tennis tournament
- Founded: 1905
- Abolished: 1977
- Location: Düsseldorf, Germany
- Venue: Rochusclub Düsseldorfer Tennisclub
- Category: Grand Prix circuit (1970-1977)
- Surface: Clay / outdoor

The Düsseldorf Grand Prix or Großer Preis von Düsseldorf was a men's clay court tennis tournament founded in 1905 as a combined event men's and women's called the Düsseldorf International or Internationale Düsseldorf. It remained a joint event until 1969 and was held at the Rochusclub Düsseldorfer Tennisclub in Düsseldorf, Germany until 1977.

== History ==
In 1898 the Rochusclub Düsseldorfer Tennisclub was founded. In 1905 the club staged the first Internationale Düsseldorf tournament. In 1929 the club moved to a new location where it remains today. It was held annually in Düsseldorf, Germany until 1977. The combined event was sanctioned by the Deutscher Lawn Tennis Bund (f.1902). From 1914 until 1969 it was an ILTF sanctioned event. In 1970 the men's event was rebranded as the Düsseldorf Grand Prix and in 1975 it became part of the Grand Prix tennis circuit. The women's event remained a part of the ILTF Circuit under the original name Düsseldorf International. In 1973 the women's event was branded as the WTA Düsseldorf Open and was part of the 1973 WTA Tour for one edition only, before it returned as an event on the ILTF Independent Tour. The women's event ended in 1974 and the men's tournament was discontinued in 1977 and replaced at the same location by the Nations Cup.

== Finals ==
=== Singles ===
(incomplete roll)

Year	Winners	Runners-up	Score
1905	(Germany) Julius Arnold Frese	(Germany) Karl Simon	6–1, 6–3, 6–3.
1911	(Netherlands) Otto Blom	(Germany) Adolf Hammacher	1–6, 7–5, 6–4, 6–4.
1925	(Germany) Otto Froitzheim	(Germany) Willi Hannemann	6–4, 1–6, 6–3, 6–1.
1927	(France) Jean Borotra	(Germany) Otto Froitzheim	4–6, 2–6, 6–1, 6–2, 6–1.
1929	(France) Jean Borotra	(Germany) Adolf Hammacher	1–6, 7–5, 6–4, 6–4.
1930	(Japan) Hyotaro Sato	(Australia) Harry Hopman	6–4, 2–6, 6–3, 5–7, 6–4.
1937	(Kingdom of Yugoslavia) Franjo Kukuljević	(Czechoslovakia) Josef Siba	1–6, 6–3, 6–1, 6–1.
1939	(Germany) Konrad Eppler	(Germany) Herbert Werner	6–4, 6–2.
1949	(United States) Earl Cochell	(Argentina) Heraldo Weiss	6–2, 6–2, 6–1.
1950	(Argentina) Heraldo Weiss	(India) Dilip Bose	3–6, 8–6, 6–4, 6–3.
1951	(Sweden) Torsten Johansson	(Poland) Wladyslaw Skonecki	9–7, 7–5, 2–6, 6–3.
1953	(United States) Herb Flam	(Egypt) Jaroslav Drobný	3–6, 6–4, 3–6, 6–1, 6–2.
1955	(Egypt) Jaroslav Drobný	(Australia) Mervyn Rose	6–2, 6–0, 6–3.
1957	(Chile) Luis Ayala	(Australia) Mal Anderson	6–4, 6–2, 6–4.
1961	(India) Ramanathan Krishnan	(Australia) Barry Phillips-Moore	6–1, 6–2, 6–1.
1962	(West Germany) Wilhelm Bungert	(West Germany) Christian Kuhnke	5–7, 6–1, 6–4, 3–6, 6–4.
1963	(Australia) Fred Stolle	(Brazil) José Edison Mandarino	6–4, 6–4, 6–1.
1967	(West Germany) Wilhelm Bungert	(West Germany) Ingo Buding	6–1, 3–6, 6–3, 6–3.
1968	(Hungary) István Gulyás	(West Germany) Wilhelm Bungert	6–1, 6–3, 3–6, 7–5.
↓ Open era ↓
1969	(West Germany) Christian Kuhnke	(West Germany) Wilhelm Bungert	6–1, 6–8, 6–2, 6–2.
1970	(West Germany) Wilhelm Bungert	(West Germany) Christian Kuhnke	6–3, 6–0, 6–4.
1971	(West Germany) Christian Kuhnke	(Japan) Toshiro Sakai	6–3, 6–2, 6–2.
1972	(Romania) Ilie Năstase	(West Germany) Jürgen Fassbender	6–0, 6–2, 6–1
1973	(West Germany) Hans-Jürgen Pohmann	(West Germany) Jürgen Fassbender	6–2, 6–3, 6–3
1974	(Belgium) Bernard Mignot	(Czechoslovakia) Jiří Hřebec	6–1, 6–0, 0–6, 6–4
1975	(Chile) Jaime Fillol	(Czechoslovakia) Jan Kodeš	6–4, 1–6, 6–0, 7–5
1976	(Sweden) Björn Borg	(Spain) Manuel Orantes	6–2, 6–2, 6–0
1977	(Poland) Wojciech Fibak	(South Africa) Raymond Moore	6–1, 5–7, 6–2
replaced by Nations Cup

=== Doubles ===
(incomplete roll)

Year	Champions	Runners-up	Score
1974	(Czechoslovakia) Jiří Hřebec (Czechoslovakia) Jan Kodeš	(Japan) Kenichi Hirai (Japan) Toshiro Sakai	6–1, 6–4
1975	(France) François Jauffret (Czechoslovakia) Jan Kodeš	(West Germany) Harald Elschenbroich (Austria) Hans Kary	6–2, 6–3
1976	(Poland) Wojciech Fibak (West Germany) Karl Meiler	(Australia) Bob Carmichael (South Africa) Raymond Moore	6–4, 4–6, 6–4
1977	(West Germany) Jürgen Fassbender (West Germany) Karl Meiler	(Australia) Paul Kronk (Australia) Cliff Letcher	6–3, 6–3

== See also ==
- Düsseldorf Open (ATP Tour)
- Düsseldorf Open (WTA Tour)
