= Rochusclub Düsseldorfer Tennisclub =

Tennis club in Dusseldorf, Germany

Coordinates: 51°15′00″N 6°49′41″E

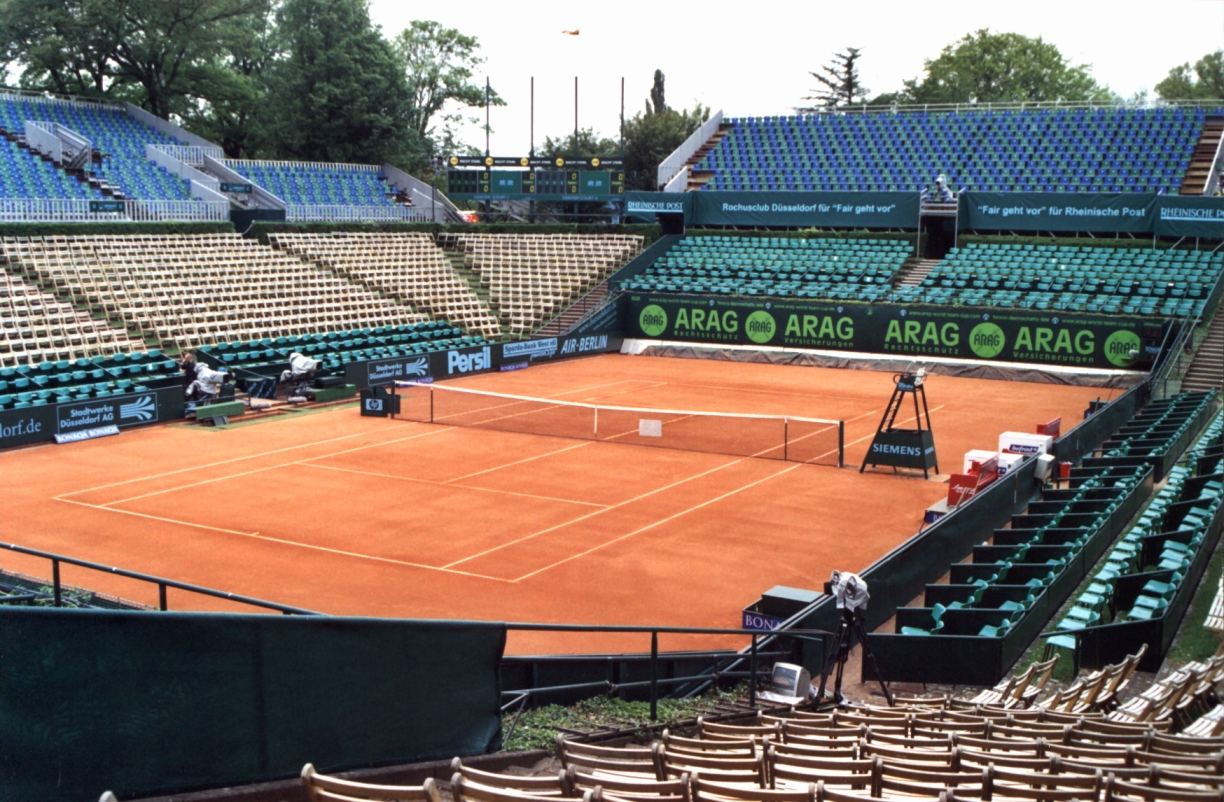
- Tennis Stadium Rochusclub
- Formation: 1898
- Legal status: Active
- Purpose: Tennis Venue
- Location: Düsseldorf, North Rhine-Westphalia, Germany
- Region served: Düsseldorf
- Official language: German
- Website: Official website

The Rochusclub Düsseldorfer Tennisclub is a tennis venue that is part of the Rochusclub sports complex located in Düsseldorf in Germany. The club was founded in 1898, before moving to a new location in 1929 where it has remained.

The club has hosted the following tennis tournaments:

(i) the Düsseldorf International (1905-1969);

(ii) the Düsseldorf Grand Prix (1970-1977); and

(iii) the ATP World Team Cup (1975-2012)

The Power Horse Cup was created to host these events since 2013, replacing the old venue.
