= 1972 Wimbledon Championships – Men's doubles =

Men's doubles
- 1972 Wimbledon Championships

Final
- Champions: (South Africa) Bob Hewitt (South Africa) Frew McMillan
- Runners-up: (United States) Stan Smith (United States) Erik van Dillen
- Score: 6–2, 6–2, 9–7

Details
- Draw: 64 (4 Q )
- Seeds: 4

Events
| Singles | men | women | | boys | girls |
| Doubles | men | women | mixed | boys | girls |
| ← 1971 · | Wimbledon Championships | · 1973 → |

Roy Emerson and Rod Laver were prevented from defending their title due to the International Lawn Tennis Federation ban on World Championship Tennis contract players competing in their tournaments.

Bob Hewitt and Frew McMillan defeated Stan Smith and Erik van Dillen in the final, 6–2, 6–2, 9–7 to win the gentlemen's doubles title at the 1972 Wimbledon Championships.

== Seeds ==
1. (South Africa) Bob Hewitt / (South Africa) Frew McMillan (champions)
2. (United States) Stan Smith / (United States) Erik van Dillen (final)
3. (France) Pierre Barthès / (Spain) Andrés Gimeno (third round)
4. (Spain) Juan Gisbert / (Spain) Manuel Orantes (quarterfinals)

Click on the seed number of a player to go to their draw section.

== Draw ==
=== Key ===
- Q = Qualifier
- WC = Wild card
- LL = Lucky loser
- Alt = Alternate
- ITF = ITF entry
- PR = Protected ranking
- SR = Special ranking
- SE = Special exempt
- JE = Junior exempt
- JR = Junior Accelerator Programme entrant
- CO = College Accelerator Programme entrant
- NG = Next Gen Accelerator Program entrant
- w/o = Walkover
- r = Retired
- d = Defaulted

=== Finals ===
Quarterfinals
1 | (South Africa) Bob Hewitt (South Africa) Frew McMillan | 6 | 6 | 6
Q | (United States) Mike Machette (Mexico) Raúl Ramírez | 1 | 2 | 4
4 | (Spain) Juan Gisbert (Spain) Manuel Orantes | 6 | 4 | 6 | 4 | 4
(Australia) John Cooper (Australia) Neale Fraser | 3 | 6 | 2 | 6 | 6
(United States) Clark Graebner (United States) Dick Stockton | 5 | 4 | 7
(Chile) Patricio Cornejo (Chile) Jaime Fillol | 7 | 6 | 9
(United States) Jim McManus (United States) Jim Osborne | 5 | 3 | 9 | 5
2 | (United States) Stan Smith (United States) Erik van Dillen | 7 | 6 | 8 | 7

Semifinals
1 | (South Africa) Bob Hewitt (South Africa) Frew McMillan | 8 | 4 | 9 | 6
(Australia) John Cooper (Australia) Neale Fraser | 6 | 6 | 8 | 2
(Chile) Patricio Cornejo (Chile) Jaime Fillol | 7 | 1 | 4
2 | (United States) Stan Smith (United States) Erik van Dillen | 9 | 6 | 6

Final
1 | (South Africa) Bob Hewitt (South Africa) Frew McMillan | 6 | 6 | 9
2 | (United States) Stan Smith (United States) Erik van Dillen | 2 | 2 | 7

=== Top half ===
==== Section 1 ====
First round
1 | (South Africa) R Hewitt (South Africa) F McMillan | 9 | 7 | 6
(United States) J Connors (United States) T Gorman | 8 | 5 | 4
(Italy) A Panatta (Italy) N Pietrangeli | 6 | 6 | 3 | 8 | 8
(France) J-B Chanfreau (France) G Goven | 1 | 3 | 6 | 9 | 10
Q | (New Zealand) J Simpson (United States) S Stewart | 6 | 8 | 6
(South Africa) P Cramer (South Africa) R Seegers | 4 | 6 | 3
(Soviet Union) S Likhachev (Soviet Union) A Metreveli | 3 | 9 | 6 | 6
(Australia) K Fletcher (Brazil) JE Mandarino | 6 | 7 | 3 | 1
Q | (United States) M Machette (Mexico) R Ramírez | 6 | 3 | 6 | 3 | 6
(Australia) R Crealy (South Africa) R Moore | 4 | 6 | 3 | 6 | 3
(United States) J Austin (United States) A Mayer | 9 | 6 | 6
(France) P Dominguez (France) P Proisy | 8 | 3 | 4
(France) F Jauffret (France) W N'Godrella | 6 | 4 | 3 | 5
(India) P Lall (India) J Mukerjea | 4 | 6 | 6 | 7
(Japan) J Kamiwazumi (Japan) T Sakai | 3 | 3 | 7
(Colombia) I Molina (Socialist Federal Republic of Yugoslavia) N Špear | 6 | 6 | 9

Second round
1 | (South Africa) R Hewitt (South Africa) F McMillan | 6 | 6 | 6
(France) J-B Chanfreau (France) G Goven | 3 | 3 | 1
Q | (New Zealand) J Simpson (United States) S Stewart | 6 | 4 | 1
(Soviet Union) S Likhachev (Soviet Union) A Metreveli | 8 | 6 | 6
Q | (United States) M Machette (Mexico) R Ramírez | 6 | 7 | 3 | 9
(United States) J Austin (United States) A Mayer | 2 | 5 | 6 | 8
(India) P Lall (India) J Mukerjea | 6 | 6 | 6
(Colombia) I Molina (Socialist Federal Republic of Yugoslavia) N Špear | 4 | 0 | 1

Third round
1 | (South Africa) R Hewitt (South Africa) F McMillan | 6 | 6 | 6
(Soviet Union) S Likhachev (Soviet Union) A Metreveli | 3 | 2 | 2
Q | (United States) M Machette (Mexico) R Ramírez | 5 | 6 | 4 | 6 | 6
(India) P Lall (India) J Mukerjea | 7 | 3 | 6 | 4 | 2

Quarterfinals
1 | (South Africa) R Hewitt (South Africa) F McMillan | 6 | 6 | 6
Q | (United States) M Machette (Mexico) R Ramírez | 1 | 2 | 4

==== Section 2 ====
First round
4 | (Spain) J Gisbert (Spain) M Orantes | 6 | 6 | 6
(United Kingdom) P Curtis (United States) V Seixas | 4 | 4 | 4
(Australia) A Dawson (Australia) W Lloyd | 7 | 7 | 6
(Sweden) O Bengtson (Czechoslovakia) V Zedník | 5 | 5 | 4
(United States) A Olmedo (United States) R Tanner | 9 | 4 | 6 | 9
(United Kingdom) A Mills (United Kingdom) R Wilson | 8 | 6 | 3 | 7
(West Germany) W Bungert (Romania) I Năstase | 6 | 8 | 7
Q | (Rhodesia) H Irvine (Australia) G Perkins | 3 | 6 | 5
(United States) P Gerken (United States) B Gottfried | 8 | 9 | 6 | 6
(Australia) S Ball (Australia) J Bartlett | 9 | 8 | 4 | 4
(Chile) J Pinto Bravo (Chile) P Rodríguez | 2 | 3 | 5
(Australia) L Hoad (South Africa) A Segal | 6 | 6 | 7
(Hungary) S Baranyi (Hungary) P Szőke | 6 | 6 | 6
(United Kingdom) C Mottram (South Africa) D Schroder | 4 | 3 | 3
(Australia) J Cooper (Australia) N Fraser | 6 | 6 | 6 | 6
(France) J-C Barclay (France) D Contet | 3 | 3 | 8 | 4

Second round
4 | (Spain) J Gisbert (Spain) M Orantes | 7 | 9 | 6
(Australia) A Dawson (Australia) W Lloyd | 5 | 8 | 3
(United States) A Olmedo (United States) R Tanner | 6 | 3 | 8 | 3
(West Germany) W Bungert (Romania) I Năstase | 1 | 6 | 9 | 6
(United States) P Gerken (United States) B Gottfried | 6 | 7 | 1
(Australia) L Hoad (South Africa) A Segal | 8 | 9 | 6
(Hungary) S Baranyi (Hungary) P Szőke | 4 | 1 | 7 | 3
(Australia) J Cooper (Australia) N Fraser | 6 | 6 | 5 | 6

Third round
4 | (Spain) J Gisbert (Spain) M Orantes | 2 | 9 | 6 | 6
(West Germany) W Bungert (Romania) I Năstase | 6 | 7 | 3 | 4
(Australia) L Hoad (South Africa) A Segal | 3 | 9 | 3 | 4
(Australia) J Cooper (Australia) N Fraser | 6 | 8 | 6 | 6

Quarterfinals
4 | (Spain) J Gisbert (Spain) M Orantes | 6 | 4 | 6 | 4 | 4
(Australia) J Cooper (Australia) N Fraser | 3 | 6 | 2 | 6 | 6

=== Bottom half ===
==== Section 3 ====
First round
(Australia) A McDonald (Australia) K Warwick | 3 | 3 | 2
(United States) C Graebner (United States) R Stockton | 6 | 6 | 6
(Argentina) R Cano (Argentina) G Vilas | 6 | 3 | 4 | 1
(United Kingdom) K Weatherley (United Kingdom) J de Mendoza | 3 | 6 | 6 | 6
(United States) R Dell (United States) G Seewagen | 2 | 9 | 5 | 6 | 6
(United Kingdom) D Lloyd (United Kingdom) J Paish | 6 | 8 | 7 | 2 | 4
Q | (Rhodesia) A Fawcett (South Africa) J Yuill | 3 | 2 | 2
(Australia) C Dibley (Australia) G Masters | 6 | 6 | 6
(Italy) C Barazzutti (Italy) A Zugarelli | 7 | 8 | 6 | 8
(South Africa) B Bertram (South Africa) W Freer | 9 | 9 | 3 | 9
(Chile) P Cornejo (Chile) J Fillol | 7 | 5 | 6 | 9
(India) A Amritraj (India) V Amritraj | 5 | 7 | 4 | 7
(Czechoslovakia) J Hřebec (Czechoslovakia) F Pála
(West Germany) J Fassbender (West Germany) K Meiler | w/o
(Australia) P Doerner (Australia) R Keldie | 2 | 6 | 9 | 4 | 5
3 | (France) P Barthès (Spain) A Gimeno | 6 | 3 | 8 | 6 | 7

Second round
(United States) C Graebner (United States) R Stockton | 6 | 6 | 6
(United Kingdom) K Weatherley (United Kingdom) J de Mendoza | 3 | 3 | 4
(United States) R Dell (United States) G Seewagen | 3 | 6 | 2 | 6 | 3
(Australia) C Dibley (Australia) G Masters | 6 | 4 | 6 | 3 | 6
(South Africa) B Bertram (South Africa) W Freer | 3 | 3 | 4
(Chile) P Cornejo (Chile) J Fillol | 6 | 6 | 6
(Czechoslovakia) J Hřebec (Czechoslovakia) F Pála | w/o
3 | (France) P Barthès (Spain) A Gimeno

Third round
(United States) C Graebner (United States) R Stockton | 5 | 9 | 6 | 6
(Australia) C Dibley (Australia) G Masters | 7 | 8 | 2 | 3
(Chile) P Cornejo (Chile) J Fillol | 9 | 6 | 6
3 | (France) P Barthès (Spain) A Gimeno | 7 | 3 | 4

Quarterfinals
(United States) C Graebner (United States) R Stockton | 5 | 4 | 7
(Chile) P Cornejo (Chile) J Fillol | 7 | 6 | 9

==== Section 4 ====
First round
(Czechoslovakia) J Kodeš (Czechoslovakia) J Kukal | 6 | 3 | 4 | 6 | 6
(Australia) I Fletcher (Australia) B Phillips-Moore | 2 | 6 | 6 | 3 | 4
(Denmark) J Ulrich (Denmark) T Ulrich | 2 | 6 | 6 | 8 | 9
(Belgium) B Mignot (New Zealand) O Parun | 6 | 3 | 4 | 9 | 11
(United States) V Gerulaitis (United States) E Scott | 6 | 9 | 4 | 8 | 7
(Greece) N Kalogeropoulos (Rhodesia) A Pattison | 4 | 8 | 6 | 9 | 9
(United States) J McManus (United States) J Osborne | 6 | 6 | 6
(United Kingdom) S Matthews (United Kingdom) S Warboys | 4 | 4 | 4
(Jamaica) L Lumsden (Jamaica) R Russell | 2 | 4 | 7
(Brazil) T Koch (Brazil) LF Tavares | 6 | 6 | 9
(Romania) P Mărmureanu (Switzerland) D Sturdza | 8 | 2 | 6 | 1
(United States) M Estep (South Africa) T Ryan | 9 | 6 | 4 | 6
(Italy) P Bertolucci (Italy) E di Matteo | 2 | 3 | 4
(United Kingdom) J Clifton (United Kingdom) P Hutchins | 6 | 6 | 6
(Hungary) I Gulyás (Austria) P Pokorny | 4 | 0 | 6 | 2
2 | (United States) S Smith (United States) E van Dillen | 6 | 6 | 3 | 6

Second round
(Czechoslovakia) J Kodeš (Czechoslovakia) J Kukal | 8 | 7 | 6 | 6
(Belgium) B Mignot (New Zealand) O Parun | 9 | 5 | 2 | 4
(Greece) N Kalogeropoulos (Rhodesia) A Pattison | 4 | 3 | 8
(United States) J McManus (United States) J Osborne | 6 | 6 | 9
(Brazil) T Koch (Brazil) LF Tavares | 7 | 4 | 5 | 6 | 6
(United States) M Estep (South Africa) T Ryan | 5 | 6 | 7 | 1 | 4
(United Kingdom) J Clifton (United Kingdom) P Hutchins | 1 | 9 | 2 | 4
2 | (United States) S Smith (United States) E van Dillen | 6 | 7 | 6 | 6

Third round
(Czechoslovakia) J Kodeš (Czechoslovakia) J Kukal | 3 | 6 | 6 | 3 | 4
(United States) J McManus (United States) J Osborne | 6 | 4 | 3 | 6 | 6
(Brazil) T Koch (Brazil) LF Tavares | 9 | 4 | 7 | 4
2 | (United States) S Smith (United States) E van Dillen | 8 | 6 | 9 | 6

Quarterfinals
(United States) J McManus (United States) J Osborne | 5 | 3 | 9 | 5
2 | (United States) S Smith (United States) E van Dillen | 7 | 6 | 8 | 7
