= 1973 Australian Open – Men's doubles =

Men's doubles
- 1973 Australian Open

Final
- Champions: (Australia) Mal Anderson (Australia) John Newcombe
- Runners-up: (Australia) John Alexander (Australia) Phil Dent
- Score: 6–3, 6–4, 7–6

Details
- Draw: 32
- Seeds: 8

Events
Singles	men	women		boys	girls
Doubles	men	women	mixed	boys	girls
WC Singles	men	women	quad
WC Doubles	men	women	quad
Legends	men	women	mixed
- Australian Open

Owen Davidson and Ken Rosewall were the defending champions.

== Seeds ==
1. (Australia) Mal Anderson / (Australia) John Newcombe (champion)
2. (Australia) John Alexander / (Australia) Phil Dent (final)
3. (Australia) Ross Case / (Australia) Geoff Masters (semifinals)
4. (Australia) John Cooper / (Australia) Colin Dibley (quarterfinals)
5. (Soviet Union) Teimuraz Kakulia / (Soviet Union) Aleksandre Metreweli (semifinals)
6. (Australia) Bob Carmichael / (Australia) Allan Stone (quarterfinals)
7. (New Zealand) Onny Parun / (Australia) Barry Phillips-Moore (second round)
8. (Australia) Bill Bowrey / (Australia) Dick Crealy (quarterfinals)

== Draw ==
Key

- Q = Qualifier
- WC = Wild card
- LL = Lucky loser
- Alt = Alternate
- ITF = ITF entry
- PR = Protected ranking
- SR = Special ranking
- SE = Special exempt
- JE = Junior exempt
- JR = Junior Accelerator Programme entrant
- CO = College Accelerator Programme entrant
- NG = Next Gen Accelerator Program entrant
- w/o = Walkover
- r = Retired
- d = Defaulted

=== Finals ===
Semifinals
1	(Australia) Mal Anderson (Australia) John Newcombe	7	2	8
5	(Soviet Union) Teimuraz Kakulia (Soviet Union) Aleksandre Metreweli	5	6	6
3	(Australia) Ross Case (Australia) Geoff Masters	7	6	4
2	(Australia) John Alexander (Australia) Phil Dent	6	7	6

Final
1	(Australia) Mal Anderson (Australia) John Newcombe	6	6	7
2	(Australia) John Alexander (Australia) Phil Dent	3	4	6

=== Top half ===
First round
1	(Australia) M Anderson (Australia) J Newcombe	6	6
(Australia) M Cocks (Australia) I Pollard	0	2
(West Germany) F Gebert (Austria) H Kary	5	4
(Australia) S Ball (Australia) B Giltinan	7	6
8	(Australia) B Bowrey (Australia) D Crealy	6	6	6
(Australia) J Bartlett (Australia) G Perkins	3	7	3
(Australia) J Stephens (Australia) C Stubs	6	3	11
(France) G Goven (France) W N'Godrella	3	6	9
4	(Australia) J Cooper (Australia) C Dibley	w/o
(Australia) R Frawley (United States) W Johnson
(France) T Bernasconi (Pakistan) S Meer	2	6	2
(West Germany) K Meiler (West Germany) H-J Plötz	6	4	6
5	(Soviet Union) T Kakulia (Soviet Union) A Metreweli	6	6
(Australia) M Pettman (Australia) A Rae	2	3
(Denmark) L Elvstrøm (Australia) P Fitzgerald	6	7	5
(Australia) N Fraser (Australia) M Rose	7	6	7

Second round
1	(Australia) M Anderson (Australia) J Newcombe	3	6	6
(Australia) S Ball (Australia) B Giltinan	6	3	4
8	(Australia) B Bowrey (Australia) D Crealy	4	7	6
(Australia) J Stephens (Australia) C Stubs	6	6	4
4	(Australia) J Cooper (Australia) C Dibley	7	7
(West Germany) K Meiler (West Germany) H-J Plötz	5	5
5	(Soviet Union) T Kakulia (Soviet Union) A Metreweli	7	6
(Australia) N Fraser (Australia) M Rose	5	4

Quarterfinals
1	(Australia) M Anderson (Australia) J Newcombe	7	6
8	(Australia) B Bowrey (Australia) D Crealy	6	1
4	(Australia) J Cooper (Australia) C Dibley	7	3	4
5	(Soviet Union) T Kakulia (Soviet Union) A Metreweli	6	6	6

Semifinals
1	(Australia) M Anderson (Australia) J Newcombe	7	2	8
5	(Soviet Union) T Kakulia (Soviet Union) A Metreweli	5	6	6

=== Bottom half ===
First round
(Japan) J Kamiwazumi (Japan) K Tanabe	6	4
(Australia) A McDonald (Australia) K Warwick	7	6
(Greece) N Kelaidis (Japan) J Kuki	4	4
6	(Australia) B Carmichael (Australia) A Stone	6	6
(Australia) W Durham (Australia) M Senior	7	7
(Hungary) R Machán (Hungary) B Taróczy	5	6
(Australia) A Dawson (Australia) P Kronk	2	4
3	(Australia) R Case (Australia) G Masters	6	6
(France) P Dominguez (France) P Proisy	6	6
(Australia) C Letcher (Australia) G Thomson	3	2
(Hungary) S Baranyi (Hungary) G Varga	6	3
7	(New Zealand) O Parun (Australia) B Phillips-Moore	7	6
(Netherlands) M Koek (Australia) F Sedgman	3	3
(Australia) J James (Australia) M Phillips	6	6
(United States) T Noonan (Australia) G Parker	3	4
2	(Australia) J Alexander (Australia) P Dent	6	6

Second round
(Australia) A McDonald (Australia) K Warwick	6	6
6	(Australia) B Carmichael (Australia) A Stone	7	7
(Australia) W Durham (Australia) M Senior	1	4
3	(Australia) R Case (Australia) G Masters	6	6
(France) P Dominguez (France) P Proisy	6	4	6
7	(New Zealand) O Parun (Australia) B Phillips-Moore	4	6	2
(Australia) J James (Australia) M Phillips	7	3	4
2	(Australia) J Alexander (Australia) P Dent	6	6	6

Quarterfinals
6	(Australia) B Carmichael (Australia) A Stone	5	4
3	(Australia) R Case (Australia) G Masters	7	6
(France) P Dominguez (France) P Proisy	3	2
2	(Australia) J Alexander (Australia) P Dent	6	6

Semifinals
3	(Australia) R Case (Australia) G Masters	7	6	4
2	(Australia) J Alexander (Australia) P Dent	6	7	6
