= 1972 French Open – Men's singles =

Men's singles
- 1972 French Open

Final
- Champion: (Spain) Andrés Gimeno
- Runner-up: (France) Patrick Proisy
- Score: 4–6, 6–3, 6–1, 6–1

Details
- Draw: 64 (16Q)
- Seeds: 16

Events
Singles	men	women		boys	girls
Doubles	men	women	mixed	boys	girls
WC Singles	men	women	quad
WC Doubles	men	women	quad
Legends	−45	45+	women
- French Open

Andrés Gimeno defeated Patrick Proisy in the final, 4–6, 6–3, 6–1, 6–1 to win the men's singles tennis title at the 1972 French Open. It was his first and only major title and, at the age of 34 years, 306 days, was the oldest first-time major champion in the Open Era.

Jan Kodeš was the two-time defending champion, but lost in the quarterfinals to Proisy.

The French Lawn Tennis Federation halved the size of the draw from 128 to 64 players in an attempt to attract the top players on tour to the tournament; this change was reverted the following year as results were mixed.

== Seeds ==
The seeded players are listed below. Andrés Gimeno is the champion; others show the round in which they were eliminated.

1. (Czechoslovakia) Jan Kodeš (quarterfinals)
2. (Romania) Ilie Năstase (first round)
3. (United States) Stan Smith (quarterfinals)
4. (Spain) Manuel Orantes (semifinals)
5. (South Africa) Bob Hewitt (first round)
6. (Spain) Andrés Gimeno (champion)
7. (France) Pierre Barthès (third round)
8. (Socialist Federal Republic of Yugoslavia) Željko Franulović (first round)
9. (France) Patrick Proisy (final)
10. (Soviet Union) Alex Metreveli (semifinals)
11. (United States) Clark Graebner (third round)
12. (United States) Jimmy Connors (second round)
13. (Chile) Jaime Fillol Sr. (second round)
14. (Czechoslovakia) František Pála (third round)
15. -
16. (Australia) Barry Phillips-Moore (third round)

== Draw ==
Key

- Q = Qualifier
- WC = Wild card
- LL = Lucky loser
- Alt = Alternate
- ITF = ITF entry
- PR = Protected ranking
- SR = Special ranking
- SE = Special exempt
- JE = Junior exempt
- JR = Junior Accelerator Programme entrant
- CO = College Accelerator Programme entrant
- NG = Next Gen Accelerator Program entrant
- w/o = Walkover
- r = Retired
- d = Defaulted

=== Finals ===
Quarterfinals
(Italy) Adriano Panatta	6	9	3	3
10	(Soviet Union) Alex Metreveli	8	7	6	6
3	(United States) Stan Smith	1	9	0	5
6	(Spain) Andrés Gimeno	6	7	6	7
(United States) Harold Solomon	4	7	3	2
4	(Spain) Manuel Orantes	6	5	6	6
9	(France) Patrick Proisy	6	6	2	6	6
1	(Czechoslovakia) Jan Kodeš	3	8	6	2	1

Semifinals
10	(Soviet Union) Alex Metreveli	6	3	1	6	3
6	(Spain) Andrés Gimeno	4	6	6	2	6
4	(Spain) Manuel Orantes	3	5	2
9	(France) Patrick Proisy	6	7	6

Final
6	(Spain) Andrés Gimeno	4	6	6	6
9	(France) Patrick Proisy	6	3	1	1

=== Top half ===
==== Section 1 ====
First preliminary round
(France) JB Chanfreau	4	0	3
Q	(Chile) P Rodríguez	6	6	6
(United Kingdom) D Lloyd	6	5	2	0
(Soviet Union) V Korotkov	1	7	6	6
LL	(Italy) M di Domenico	5	5	7	6	5
Q	(France) P Beust	7	7	5	2	7
(Chile) P Cornejo	6	11	6
(Soviet Union) S Likhachev	3	9	3

Second preliminary round
Q	(Chile) P Rodríguez	7	5	2	1
(Soviet Union) V Korotkov	5	7	6	6
Q	(France) P Beust	5	1	3
(Chile) P Cornejo	7	6	6

First round
2	(Romania) I Năstase	6	7	4	3
(Italy) A Panatta	1	9	6	6
(Soviet Union) V Korotkov	10	0	6	5	6
(Australia) C Dibley	8	6	2	7	3
(Pakistan) H Rahim	6	3	8	4	3
(South Africa) R Moore	2	6	6	6	6
(Chile) P Cornejo	3	4	6	1
(Rhodesia) A Pattison	6	6	4	6

Second round
(Italy) A Panatta	6	2	7	6
(Soviet Union) V Korotkov	1	6	5	3
(South Africa) R Moore	w/o
(Rhodesia) A Pattison

Third round
(Italy) A Panatta	6	7	6	6
(South Africa) R Moore	0	9	3	2

==== Section 2 ====
First preliminary round
(Soviet Union) T Lejus	1	2	6	1
Q	(Hungary) G Varga	6	6	4	6
(Japan) T Sakai	4	6	6	2	2
(Australia) G Masters	6	1	2	6	6
(Sweden) O Bengtson	2	10	4
Q	(Argentina) R Cano	6	12	6
(Poland) W Gąsiorek	6	6	3	3	7
(Australia) R Case	1	1	6	6	5

Second preliminary round
Q	(Hungary) G Varga	7	5	2	1
(Australia) G Masters	5	7	6	6
Q	(Argentina) R Cano	6	3	3	6	2
(Poland) W Gąsiorek	3	6	6	3	6

First round
7	(France) P Barthès	w/o
(Australia) L Hoad
(Australia) G Masters	6	6	6
(Poland) T Nowicki	1	1	2
10	(Soviet Union) A Metreveli	6	2	6	6
(West Germany) H Elschenbroich	3	6	4	3
(Poland) W Gąsiorek	5	6	6	6
(South Africa) P Cramer	7	4	4	3

Second round
7	(France) P Barthès	6	6	6
(Australia) G Masters	3	3	4
10	(Soviet Union) A Metreveli	6	6	7	7
(Poland) W Gąsiorek	0	4	9	5

Third round
7	(France) P Barthès	6	2	12	3
10	(Soviet Union) A Metreveli	8	6	10	6

==== Section 3 ====
First preliminary round
(Romania) P Mărmureanu	6	5	6
Q	(Soviet Union) T Kakulia	8	7	8
(Spain) J Guerrero	6	3	4	6
(Socialist Federal Republic of Yugoslavia) N Špear	4	6	6	8
(United States) B Gottfried	3	6	6	9
Q	(France) B Montrenaud	6	4	0	7
(France) JP Meyer	8	7	6
(United States) J Osborne	6	5	4

Second preliminary round
Q	(Soviet Union) T Kakoulia	6	7	6
(Socialist Federal Republic of Yugoslavia) N Špear	4	5	3
(United States) B Gottfried	6	6	6
(France) JP Meyer	2	4	3

First round
3	(United States) S Smith	6	6	6
(France) JL Rouyer	4	2	4
Q	(Soviet Union) T Kakoulia	0	1	5
(Belgium) B Mignot	6	6	7
14	(Czechoslovakia) F Pála	6	7	6
(United States) A Olmedo	2	5	2
(United States) B Gottfried	6	6	6
(France) P Dominguez	2	3	1

Second round
3	(United States) S Smith	6	7	7	6
(Belgium) B Mignot	3	5	9	3
14	(Czechoslovakia) F Pála	10	10	9	8
(United States) B Gottfried	8	8	11	6

Third round
3	(United States) S Smith	6	6	6
14	(Czechoslovakia) F Pála	4	0	3

==== Section 4 ====
First preliminary round
(Colombia) J Velasco	7	2	3
Q	(Italy) P Toci	9	6	6
(Denmark) T Ulrich	6	6	2	1	1
(France) D Contet	3	4	6	6	6
(Czechoslovakia) J Hřebec	6	7	6
Q	(France) F Pierson	4	5	4
(West Germany) A Korpás	6	6	6
(Japan) J Kamiwazumi	4	3	2

Second preliminary round
Q	(Italy) P Toci	4	0	6	0
(France) D Contet	6	6	0	6
(Czechoslovakia) J Hřebec	6	6	6
(West Germany) A Korpás	1	3	2

First round
6	(Spain) A Gimeno	6	6	6
(Chile) J Pinto-Bravo	2	2	1
(France) D Contet	0	2	0
(Belgium) P Hombergen	6	6	6
11	(United States) C Graebner	6	6	6
(Brazil) T Koch	2	0	2
(Czechoslovakia) J Hřebec	1	6	6	1	6
(Hungary) I Gulyás	6	2	2	6	3

Second round
6	(Spain) A Gimeno	6	6	6
(Belgium) P Hombergen	1	3	1
11	(United States) C Graebner	6	6	6
(Czechoslovakia) J Hřebec	1	0	4

Third round
6	(Spain) A Gimeno	3	6	5	6	6
11	(United States) C Graebner	6	3	7	2	1

=== Bottom half ===
==== Section 5 ====
First preliminary round
(Spain) A Muñoz	6	6	6
(Australia) J Cooper	2	0	2
Q	(United States) S Stewart	5	6	2	7
(Czechoslovakia) J Kukal	7	4	6	9
(Australia) K Warwick	5	6	9	6
(Austria) H Kary	7	3	7	4
Q	(United States) S Faulk	5	3	4
(Argentina) G Vilas	7	6	6

Second preliminary round
(Spain) A Muñoz	6	6	6
(Czechoslovakia) J Kukal	2	3	4
(Australia) K Warwick	3	0	0
(Argentina) G Vilas	6	6	6

First round
(United States) H Solomon	6
(Australia) M Mulligan	1	r.
(Spain) A Muñoz	3	5	6
12	(United States) J Connors	6	7	8
(Hungary) S Baranyi	6	9	6
(Romania) I Țiriac	2	7	3
(Argentina) G Vilas	0	8	8	2	6
5	(South Africa) B Hewitt	6	6	6	6	2

Second round
(United States) H Solomon	6	7	6
12	(United States) J Connors	4	5	1
(Hungary) S Baranyi	6	2	7	6	3
(Argentina) G Vilas	3	6	5	8	6

Third round
(United States) H Solomon	3	8	6	6	6
(Argentina) G Vilas	6	10	2	4	4

==== Section 6 ====
First preliminary round
(India) J Mukerjea	6	6	6
(France) W N'Godrella	3	2	3
Q	(United Kingdom) J De Mendoza	6	6	1	6
(Italy) E Castigliano	2	1	6	4
(Czechoslovakia) M Holeček	7	6	2	1	2
(Italy) E Di Matteo	5	3	6	6	6
Q	(Socialist Federal Republic of Yugoslavia) Z Ivančić	6	2	6	3	2
(France) M Leclercq	3	6	0	6	6

Second preliminary round
(India) J Mukerjea	3	5	2
Q	(United Kingdom) J De Mendoza	6	7	6
(Italy) E Di Matteo	6	6	11
(France) M Leclercq	2	2	9

First round
(Australia) D Crealy	2	6	9	4
(Italy) N Pietrangeli	6	3	11	6
Q	(United Kingdom) J De Mendoza	6	6	4	2
13	(Chile) J Fillol Sr.	2	8	6	6
(France) G Goven
(Socialist Federal Republic of Yugoslavia) B Jovanović	w/o
(Italy) E Di Matteo	6	1	7	1
4	(Spain) M Orantes	4	6	9	6

Second round
(Italy) N Pietrangeli	6	6	4	6
13	(Chile) J Fillol Sr.	3	2	6	4
(Socialist Federal Republic of Yugoslavia) B Jovanović	0	1	0
4	(Spain) M Orantes	6	6	6

Third round
(Italy) N Pietrangeli	2	1	3
4	(Spain) M Orantes	6	6	6

==== Section 7 ====
First preliminary round
(United States) J McManus	4	6	3	8	3
(Italy) A Zugarelli	6	3	6	6	6
Q	(South Africa) R Seegers	6	0	6	1	7
(Brazil) J Mandarino	1	6	3	6	9
(West Germany) W Bungert	1	3	3
(United Kingdom) J Paish	6	6	6
Q	(United States) S Turner	6	0	2	3
(Australia) I Fletcher	4	6	6	6

Second preliminary round
(Italy) A Zugarelli	6	2	14	2
(Brazil) J Mandarino	4	6	16	6
(United Kingdom) J Paish	4	3	1
(Australia) I Fletcher	6	6	6

First round
(Spain) J Gisbert Sr	6	6	8
(Czechoslovakia) V Zednik	4	3	6
(Brazil) J Mandarino	2	6	3
9	(France) P Proisy	6	8	6
(Italy) P Bertolucci	0	4	1
(France) F Jauffret	6	6	6
(Australia) I Fletcher	6	6	6
8	(Socialist Federal Republic of Yugoslavia) Z Franulović	4	4	1

Second round
(Spain) J Gisbert Sr	4	3	6	6
9	(France) P Proisy	6	6	2	8
(France) F Jauffret	8	3	2	4
(Australia) I Fletcher	6	6	6	6

Third round
9	(France) P Proisy	6	1	6	6
(Australia) I Fletcher	4	6	2	3

==== Section 8 ====
First preliminary round
(Colombia) I Molina	6	6	3	7	5
(Greece) N Kalogeropoulos	4	3	6	9	7
Q	(Australia) B Rheinberger	3	5	6	6	3
(West Germany) J Fassbender	6	7	3	4	6
(Italy) C Barazzutti	6	1	3	4
(France) JC Barclay	2	6	6	6
Q	(Australia) A McDonald	4	6	6	6
(South Africa) T Ryan	6	1	3	3

Second preliminary round
(Greece) N Kalogeropoulos	3	6	6	4	2
(West Germany) J Fassbender	6	3	3	6	6
(France) JC Barclay	6	3	6	7
Q	(Australia) A McDonald	1	6	0	5

First round
(New Zealand) O Parun	6	6	8
(United States) T Gorman	3	3	6
(West Germany) J Fassbender	1	4	1
16	(Australia) B Phillips-Moore	6	6	6
(Hungary) P Szőke	5	6	4	3
(South Africa) F McMillan	7	2	6	6
(France) JC Barclay	5	7	6	2
1	(Czechoslovakia) J Kodeš	7	9	2	6

Second round
(New Zealand) O Parun	2	4	2
16	(Australia) B Phillips-Moore	6	6	6
(South Africa) F McMillan	3	0	3
1	(Czechoslovakia) J Kodeš	6	6	6

Third round
16	(Australia) B Phillips-Moore	4	2	4
1	(Czechoslovakia) J Kodeš	6	6	6

Preceded by 1972 Australian Open – Men's singles	Grand Slam men's singles	Succeeded by 1972 Wimbledon Championships – Men's singles
