= 1972 Wimbledon Championships – Men's singles =

Men's singles
- 1972 Wimbledon Championships

Final
- Champion: (United States) Stan Smith
- Runner-up: (Romania) Ilie Năstase
- Score: 4–6, 6–3, 6–3, 4–6, 7–5

Details
- Draw: 128 (8 Q )
- Seeds: 8

Events
Singles	men	women		boys	girls
Doubles	men	women	mixed	boys	girls
← 1971 ·	Wimbledon Championships	· 1973 →

Stan Smith defeated Ilie Năstase in the final, 4–6, 6–3, 6–3, 4–6, 7–5 to win the gentlemen's singles tennis title at the 1972 Wimbledon Championships. It was his first Wimbledon singles title, and his second and last major singles title. Due to rain washing out the final Saturday when the final was due to take place, the men's singles final became the first match in Wimbledon history to take place on a Sunday. Not until ten years later in 1982 did Wimbledon men's singles finals start being deliberately scheduled for Sunday.

Two-time reigning champion John Newcombe was prevented from participating due to the International Lawn Tennis Federation ban on World Championship Tennis-contracted players competing in its tournaments.

== Seeds ==
1. (United States) Stan Smith (champion)
2. (Romania) Ilie Năstase (final)
3. (Spain) Manuel Orantes (semifinals)
4. (Spain) Andrés Gimeno (second round)
5. (Czechoslovakia) Jan Kodeš (semifinals)
6. (France) Pierre Barthès (fourth round)
7. (South Africa) Bob Hewitt (first round)
8. (Soviet Union) Alex Metreveli (quarterfinals)

Click on the seed number of a player to go to their draw section.

== Draw ==
=== Key ===
- Q = Qualifier
- WC = Wild card
- LL = Lucky loser
- Alt = Alternate
- ITF = ITF entry
- PR = Protected ranking
- SR = Special ranking
- SE = Special exempt
- JE = Junior exempt
- JR = Junior Accelerator Programme entrant
- CO = College Accelerator Programme entrant
- NG = Next Gen Accelerator Program entrant
- w/o = Walkover
- r = Retired
- d = Defaulted

=== Finals ===
Quarterfinals
1	(United States) Stan Smith	6	8	6
8	(Soviet Union) Alex Metreveli	2	6	2
(New Zealand) Onny Parun	2	3	4
5	(Czechoslovakia) Jan Kodeš	6	6	6
(Australia) Colin Dibley	2	0	2
3	(Spain) Manuel Orantes	6	6	6
(United States) Jimmy Connors	4	4	1
2	(Romania) Ilie Năstase	6	6	6

Semifinals
1	(United States) Stan Smith	3	6	6	7
5	(Czechoslovakia) Jan Kodeš	6	4	1	5
3	(Spain) Manuel Orantes	3	4	4
2	(Romania) Ilie Năstase	6	6	6

Final
1	(United States) Stan Smith	4	6	6	4	7
2	(Romania) Ilie Năstase	6	3	3	6	5

=== Top half ===
==== Section 1 ====
First round
1	(United States) S Smith	6	6	6
(West Germany) H-J Plötz	1	1	3
Q	(Australia) A Gardiner	2	9	2	7	4
(Rhodesia) H Irvine	6	7	6	5	6
(Chile) P Cornejo	4	8	3
(Japan) T Sakai	6	9	6
(United Kingdom) S Matthews	6	3	3	7	3
Q	(United States) A Mayer	4	6	6	5	6
(Australia) I Fletcher	6	6	6
(France) J-L Rouyer	4	3	3
(United States) A Olmedo	4	6	6	6
(Denmark) J Ulrich	6	3	3	4
Q	(Australia) W Durham	3	8	4
(Czechoslovakia) F Pála	6	9	6
(Austria) H Kary	8	6	8	3	6
(Hungary) P Szőke	6	3	9	6	0

Second round
1	(United States) S Smith	6	9	6
(Rhodesia) H Irvine	4	8	3
(Japan) T Sakai	9	3	2	4
Q	(United States) A Mayer	8	6	6	6
(Australia) I Fletcher	6	6	1	6
(United States) A Olmedo	0	4	6	3
(Czechoslovakia) F Pála	4	7	2	7	6
(Austria) H Kary	6	5	6	5	2

Third round
1	(United States) S Smith	6	7	3	9
Q	(United States) A Mayer	3	5	6	7
(Australia) I Fletcher	6	6	6
(Czechoslovakia) F Pála	1	0	1

Fourth round
1	(United States) S Smith	8	4	6	6
(Australia) I Fletcher	6	6	2	4

==== Section 2 ====
First round
8	(Soviet Union) A Metreveli	6	8	6
Q	(Italy) P Marzano	2	6	4
(New Zealand) J Simpson	3	6	1	5
(France) P Dominguez	6	4	6	7
(Denmark) T Ulrich	6	3
(United Kingdom) J Clifton	2	0^{r}
(United Kingdom) J Paish	7	6	9	6
Q	(United States) E Scott	9	4	8	3
(France) P Proisy	6	9	8	6
(Soviet Union) S Likhachev	4	8	9	4
(South Africa) P Cramer	6	7	6
(Hungary) I Gulyás	4	5	4
(France) J-C Barclay	3	5	8	4
Q	(United States) M Estep	6	7	6	6
Q	(United Kingdom) P Hutchins	3	6	5
(Japan) J Kamiwazumi	6	8	7

Second round
8	(Soviet Union) A Metreveli	7	6	6	6
(France) P Dominguez	9	1	4	4
(Denmark) T Ulrich	3	5	2
(United Kingdom) J Paish	6	7	6
(France) P Proisy	3	5	4
(South Africa) P Cramer	6	7	6
Q	(United States) M Estep	6	6	6
(Japan) J Kamiwazumi	4	2	2

Third round
8	(Soviet Union) A Metreveli	7	6	3	6
(United Kingdom) J Paish	5	3	6	4
(South Africa) P Cramer	9	6	9
Q	(United States) M Estep	8	4	7

Fourth round
8	(Soviet Union) A Metreveli	6	6	6
(South Africa) P Cramer	3	1	3

==== Section 3 ====
First round
4	(Spain) A Gimeno	6	6	6
(United Kingdom) K Weatherley	1	2	4
LL	(South Africa) A van der Merwe	2	5	2
(New Zealand) O Parun	6	7	6
(United Kingdom) J de Mendoza	6	3	2	5
(Australia) J Cooper	2	6	6	7
(Italy) E di Matteo	3	6	6	4	3
(West Germany) W Bungert	6	1	4	6	6
(Soviet Union) T Kakulia	9	7	7	6
(Australia) R Keldie	7	5	9	4
Q	(United States) R Knight	8	8	4
(United Kingdom) D Lloyd	9	9	6
(Argentina) G Vilas	5	5	5
(Czechoslovakia) J Hřebec	7	7	7
(Romania) P Mărmureanu	3	4	0
(Hungary) S Baranyi	6	6	6

Second round
4	(Spain) A Gimeno	4	6	8	9	4
(New Zealand) O Parun	6	8	6	8	6
(United Kingdom) J Cooper	7	4	6	2	3
(West Germany) W Bungert	5	6	0	6	6
(Soviet Union) T Kakulia	9	4	6	6
(United Kingdom) D Lloyd	8	6	3	4
(Czechoslovakia) J Hřebec	6	6	6
(Hungary) S Baranyi	2	2	4

Third round
(New Zealand) O Parun	6	4	9	9
(West Germany) W Bungert	4	6	7	7
(Soviet Union) T Kakulia	6	3	6	1
(Czechoslovakia) J Hřebec	4	6	8	6

Fourth round
(New Zealand) O Parun	8	6	6	0
(Czechoslovakia) J Hřebec	9	4	4	0^{r}

==== Section 4 ====
First round
5	(Czechoslovakia) J Kodeš	6	4	6	6
(Chile) P Rodríguez	1	6	1	1
(Australia) P Doerner	2	9	8	4
Q	(United States) G Seewagen	6	7	9	6
(France) J-P Meyer	3	6	8	7
(Czechoslovakia) M Holeček	6	3	9	9
(South Africa) D Schroder	6	2	3
Q	(United States) D Bleckinger	8	6	6
(India) V Amritraj	7	9	3	2	6
Q	(United States) J Austin	5	8	6	6	4
(Italy) P Bertolucci	2	3	3
(United States) J McManus	6	6	6
(Australia) W Lloyd	6	9	4	5	9
(France) W N'Godrella	4	8	6	7	11
(Belgium) P Hombergen	5	6	5	6	6
Q	(United States) R Bohrnstedt	7	1	7	4	3

Second round
5	(Czechoslovakia) J Kodeš	6	6	6
Q	(United States) G Seewagen	0	1	2
(Czechoslovakia) M Holeček	4	4	6	7
Q	(United States) D Bleckinger	6	6	1	9
(India) V Amritraj	1	2	6
(United States) J McManus	6	6	8
(France) W N'Godrella	7	6	3	4
(Belgium) P Hombergen	5	8	6	6

Third round
5	(Czechoslovakia) J Kodeš	6	6	6
Q	(United States) D Bleckinger	0	3	2
(United States) J McManus	6	6	6
(Belgium) P Hombergen	0	4	1

Fourth round
5	(Czechoslovakia) J Kodeš	6	6	6
(United States) J McManus	2	4	4

=== Bottom half ===
==== Section 5 ====
First round
(South Africa) T Ryan	3	4	2
(Australia) C Dibley	6	6	6
(Spain) A Muñoz	2	5	1
(United States) R Gonzales	6	7	6
(United States) R Tanner	6	2	6	7	7
(Colombia) J Velasco	3	6	4	9	5
(Chile) J Pinto Bravo	4	6	3	0
(Australia) A McDonald	6	3	6	6
(United States) J Osborne	4	2	6	6	5
(United Kingdom) C Mottram	6	6	3	2	7
(Brazil) T Koch	9	6	3	2	4
(United States) R Stockton	8	4	6	6	6
(Spain) J Gisbert	6	2	6	6
(United States) H Solomon	3	6	2	0
(France) J-B Chanfreau	5	8	3
6	(France) P Barthès	7	9	6

Second round
(Australia) C Dibley	6	6	8
(United States) R Gonzales	3	3	6
(United States) R Tanner	6	6	6
(Australia) A McDonald	2	2	4
(United Kingdom) C Mottram	8	1	4
(United States) R Stockton	9	6	6
(Spain) J Gisbert	4	2	4
6	(France) P Barthès	6	6	6

Third round
(Australia) C Dibley	9	6	9
(United States) R Tanner	8	4	8
(United States) R Stockton	3	3	7	4
6	(France) P Barthès	6	6	5	6

Fourth round
(Australia) C Dibley	8	6	6	6
6	(France) P Barthès	9	3	2	1

==== Section 6 ====
First round
(Mexico) J Loyo Mayo	3	2	2
(Australia) B Phillips-Moore	6	6	6
(Australia) S Ball	6	4	7	6
(South Africa) F McMillan	4	6	5	3
(Romania) I Țiriac	6	6	5	7
(Italy) A Zugarelli	4	2	7	5
(Czechoslovakia) V Zedník	2	2	7
(United States) B Gottfried	6	6	9
Q	(United States) R Stock	4	3	4
(Italy) N Pietrangeli	6	6	6
(Colombia) I Molina	3	6	6	6
(Rhodesia) A Pattison	6	2	4	3
(Australia) R Crealy	9	6	1	7
(Socialist Federal Republic of Yugoslavia) N Špear	7	2	6	5
(France) G Goven	6	5	4
3	(Spain) M Orantes	8	7	6

Second round
(Australia) B Phillips-Moore	9	6	3	6
(Australia) S Ball	8	1	6	2
(Romania) I Țiriac	6	9	9
(United States) B Gottfried	4	7	8
(Italy) N Pietrangeli	2	8	6	7
(Colombia) I Molina	6	6	3	5
(Australia) R Crealy	2	3	2
3	(Spain) M Orantes	6	6	6

Third round
(Australia) B Phillips-Moore	6	1	2
(Romania) I Țiriac	8	6	6
(Italy) N Pietrangeli	2	2	1
3	(Spain) M Orantes	6	6	6

Fourth round
(Romania) I Țiriac	4	6	3	6	3
3	(Spain) M Orantes	6	4	6	4	6

==== Section 7 ====
First round
(Brazil) JE Mandarino	4	2	1
(West Germany) K Meiler	6	6	6
(United States) E van Dillen	7	8	6
Q	(United States) S Stewart	5	6	1
(France) F Jauffret	1	7	8	6	7
(Sweden) O Bengtson	6	5	9	1	5
(Italy) C Barazzutti	6	8	2	6	0
(United Kingdom) J Feaver	4	9	6	3	6
(Czechoslovakia) J Kukal	4	8	6	6	8
Q	(Argentina) M Vázquez	6	9	4	4	6
(Italy) A Panatta	6	8	4	6	6
(Australia) N Fraser	4	9	6	4	1
(United Kingdom) S Warboys	1	6	3	4
(Greece) N Kalogeropoulos	6	1	6	6
(United States) J Connors	6	9	7
7	(South Africa) R Hewitt	3	7	5

Second round
(West Germany) K Meiler	6	6	1	4	4
(United States) E van Dillen	3	4	6	6	6
(France) F Jauffret	6	6	6
(United Kingdom) J Feaver	2	3	4
(Czechoslovakia) J Kukal	8	9	6	8
(Italy) A Panatta	9	8	8	9
(Greece) N Kalogeropoulos	3	5	6
(United States) J Connors	6	7	8

Third round
(United States) E van Dillen	6	1	4
(France) F Jauffret	8	6	6
(Italy) A Panatta	3	6	4	6
(United States) J Connors	6	0	6	8

Fourth round
(France) F Jauffret	2	3	6
(United States) J Connors	6	6	8

==== Section 8 ====
First round
LL	(New Zealand) R Clarke	2	1	0
(South Africa) R Moore	6	6	6
(Belgium) B Mignot	4	4	2
(United States) T Gorman	6	6	6
(Australia) K Warwick	0	7	6	3
(Chile) J Fillol	6	9	4	6
(Australia) G Masters	8	8	4	6	12
(India) A Amritraj	9	6	6	3	10
(West Germany) J Fassbender	4	7	7	6
(Australia) L Hoad	6	5	5	4
(India) P Lall	5	6	6	3	6
Q	(United States) P Gerken	7	3	2	6	3
(United States) C Graebner	6	3	6	6
(India) J Mukerjea	2	6	4	3
(Australia) J Bartlett	4	2	2
2	(Romania) I Năstase	6	6	6

Second round
(South Africa) R Moore	4	4	5
(United States) T Gorman	6	6	7
(Chile) J Fillol	4	8	7	6
(Australia) G Masters	6	6	5	4
(West Germany) J Fassbender	6	6	9	7
(India) P Lall	4	8	7	5
(United States) C Graebner	3	6	1	2
2	(Romania) I Năstase	6	4	6	6

Third round
(United States) T Gorman	6	7	2	4	8
(Chile) J Fillol	4	5	6	6	6
(West Germany) J Fassbender	8	3	4
2	(Romania) I Năstase	9	6	6

Fourth round
(United States) T Gorman	3	6	6	1
2	(Romania) I Năstase	6	3	8	6

Preceded by 1972 French Open	Grand Slams; Men's singles	Succeeded by 1972 U.S. Open
