= 1972 US Open – Men's singles =

Men's singles
- 1972 US Open

Final
- Champion: (Romania) Ilie Năstase
- Runner-up: (United States) Arthur Ashe
- Score: 3–6, 6–3, 6–7^{(1–5)}, 6–4, 6–3

Details
- Draw: 148
- Seeds: 16

Events
Singles	men	women		boys	girls
Doubles	men	women	mixed	boys	girls
WC Singles	men	women	quad
WC Doubles	men	women	quad
Legends	men	women	mixed
- US Open

Ilie Năstase defeated Arthur Ashe in the final, 3–6, 6–3, 6–7^{(1–5)}, 6–4, 6–3 to win the men's singles tennis title at the 1972 US Open. It was his first major singles title, becoming the first Romanian to win a singles major.

Stan Smith was the defending champion, but lost in the quarterfinals to Ashe.

This marked the last major appearance of 12-time singles major champion Roy Emerson, who lost in the first round to Fred Stolle.

== Seeds ==
The seeded players are listed below. Ilie Năstase is the champion; others show the round in which they were eliminated.

1. (United States) Stan Smith (quarterfinalist)
2. (Australia) Ken Rosewall (second round)
3. (Australia) Rod Laver (fourth round)
4. (Romania) Ilie Năstase (champion)
5. (Australia) John Newcombe (third round)
6. (United States) Arthur Ashe (finalist)
7. (Netherlands) Tom Okker (third round)
8. (Czechoslovakia) Jan Kodeš (second round)
9. (United States) Marty Riessen (third round)
10. (Spain) Manuel Orantes (third round)
11. (South Africa) Cliff Drysdale (fourth round)
12. (United States) Cliff Richey (semifinalist)
13. (United States) Bob Lutz (fourth round)
14. (Spain) Andrés Gimeno (fourth round)
15. (United States) Jimmy Connors (first round)
16. (South Africa) Bob Hewitt (fourth round)

== Draw ==
=== Key ===
- Q = Qualifier
- WC = Wild card
- LL = Lucky loser
- r = Retired

=== Final eight ===
Quarterfinals
1	(United States) Stan Smith	6	4	5
6	(United States) Arthur Ashe	7	6	7
12	(United States) Cliff Richey	3	6	6	6
(South Africa) Frew McMillan	6	1	4	2
(Australia) Fred Stolle	4	6	3	2
4	(Romania) Ilie Năstase	6	3	6	6
(United States) Roscoe Tanner	6	7	6	7	4
(United States) Tom Gorman	7	5	7	5	6

Semifinals
6	(United States) Arthur Ashe	6	6	7
12	(United States) Cliff Richey	1	4	6
4	(Romania) Ilie Năstase	4	7	6	6
(United States) Tom Gorman	6	6	2	1

Final
6	(United States) Arthur Ashe	6	3	7^{5}	4	3
4	(Romania) Ilie Năstase	3	6	6^{1}	6	6

=== Top half ===
==== Section 1 ====
First round
1	(United States) Smith	5	6	7	6
(United States) Martin	7	1	5	3
(Italy) Panatta	6	3	5	2
(United States) Graebner	4	6	7	6
(Spain) Muñoz	6	6	6	6
(United States) Holmberg	4	7	3	4
(Chile) Pinto-Bravo	4	4	7	4
(Australia) Stone	6	6	6	6
14	(Spain) Gimeno	6	7	6
(Soviet Union) Korotkov	4	5	4
(United States) Owens	4	6	6	3
(Australia) Davidson	6	3	4	6
(Australia) Ruffels	6	6	6
(United States) McNair	2	3	4
(United States) Delaney	7	4	4	4
(United States) Brown	6	6	6	6

Second round
1	(United States) Smith	6	6	6	6
(United States) Graebner	1	4	7	0
(Spain) Muñoz	1	0	7	0
(Australia) Stone	6	6	6	6
14	(Spain) Gimeno	6	4	6	6
(Australia) Davidson	4	6	4	1
(Australia) Ruffels	6	7	6
(United States) Brown	3	5	4

Third round
1	(United States) Smith	6	7	7
(Australia) Stone	3	6	5
14	(Spain) Gimeno	5
(Australia) Ruffels	2	r

Fourth round
1	(United States) Smith	2	7	6	1	6
14	(Spain) Gimeno	6	6	4	6	3

==== Section 2 ====
First round
6	(United States) Ashe	6	6	4	7
(Pakistan) Rahim	3	3	6	6
(South Africa) Maud	6	6	6	6
(Japan) Kamiwazumi	2	7	2	4
(Australia) Alexander	4	7	6	4	6
(Australia) Dent	6	6	4	6	4
(Australia) Case	6	6	6
(United States) Schunck	3	2	4
13	(United States) Lutz	6	6	6
(Australia) Dibley	4	2	2
(India) Menon	6	4	4
(Argentina) Vilas	7	6	6
(United States) Kreiss	3	4	4
(United States) Scott	6	6	6
(India) Amritraj	7	6	6
(South Africa) Schroder	6	3	4

Second round
6	(United States) Ashe	6	6	7
(South Africa) Maud	4	4	6
(Australia) Alexander	6	6	6	3	4
(Australia) Case	7	7	4	6	6
13	(United States) Lutz	6	6	7
(Argentina) Vilas	3	3	5
(United States) Scott	3	6	7	7
(India) Amritraj	6	4	6	5

Third round
6	(United States) Ashe	6	6	3	6
(Australia) Case	4	4	6	1
13	(United States) Lutz	7	6	6
(United States) Scott	6	2	2

Fourth round
6	(United States) Ashe	5	7	6	6
13	(United States) Lutz	7	5	4	3

==== Section 3 ====
First round
3	(Australia) Laver	6	6	6
(United Kingdom) Paish	2	1	3
(United Kingdom) Warboys	6	6	5	2
(United States) Seewagen	7	4	7	6
(New Zealand) Fairlie	7	6	6
(United States) Austin	6	3	2
(Czechoslovakia) Pala	4	1	2
(Chile) Fillol, Sr.	6	6	6
12	(United States) Richey	6	7	6
(United States) Gottfried	2	6	2
(United States) Olmedo	6	7	6	7
(United States) Guerry	3	6	7	6
(United States) Hagey	r
(France) Goven
(United States) Gerken	7	6	6
(United States) Walthall	6	1	2

Second round
3	(Australia) Laver	6	6	7
(United States) Seewagen	3	2	5
(New Zealand) Fairlie	4	5	3
(Chile) Fillol, Sr.	6	7	6
12	(United States) Richey	6	6	7
(United States) Olmedo	2	3	5
(France) Goven	4	1	7	7	5
(United States) Gerken	6	6	6	5	7

Third round
3	(Australia) Laver	6	4	6	6	7
(Chile) Fillol, Sr.	2	6	7	1	6
12	(United States) Richey	6	6	7	6	6
(United States) Gerken	7	3	6	7	4

Fourth round
3	(Australia) Laver	6	6	6	3
12	(United States) Richey	3	7	7	6

==== Section 4 ====
Preliminary round
(Mexico) Ramírez	4	6	6	6
(United States) Giammalva	6	2	3	3
(India) Singh	6	7	6
(United States) Turner	3	6	3
9	(United States) Riessen	6	7	3	6
(United States) Teacher	3	5	6	3
(Australia) Masters	6	7	3	6
(Australia) Fletcher	3	5	6	3
(South Africa) Moore	6	7	6
(United Kingdom) Stilwell	3	6	2
(Australia) Anderson	6	6	7
(United States) Holmes	1	2	6
(South Africa) McMillan	7	7	3	7
(United States) van Dillen	5	6	6	6
(France) Rouyer	6	6	7	6
(United Kingdom) Matthews	7	3	6	1
(United States) Leonard	4	7	7	6
(United States) McMillan	6	6	6	3
(United States) Higgins	4	7	7	7
(Brazil) Koch	6	6	5	6

First round
8	(Czechoslovakia) Kodeš	6	6	6
(United States) O'Bryant	2	4	3
(United States) Mayer	6	6	6
(France) Chanfreau	4	1	3
(France) Proisy	6	6	6
(United States) DuPré	1	4	2
(Mexico) Ramírez	6	3	6	6
(India) Singh	4	6	2	1
9	(United States) Riessen	6	6	6	6
(Australia) Masters	1	7	3	2
(South Africa) Moore	4	5	7	6	1
(Australia) Anderson	6	7	6	2	6
(South Africa) McMillan	7	7	7
(France) Rouyer	5	5	6
(United States) Leonard	6	3	6	6	7
(United States) Higgins	3	6	7	4	6

Second round
8	(Czechoslovakia) Kodeš	7	6	6	3	1
(United States) Mayer	6	3	7	6	6
(France) Proisy	2	6	6	6	4
(Mexico) Ramírez	6	2	1	7	6
9	(United States) Riessen	6	7	6	7
(Australia) Anderson	3	5	7	5
(South Africa) McMillan	6	6	6
(United States) Leonard	2	3	4

Third round
(United States) Mayer	6	6	6
(Mexico) Ramírez	3	3	1
9	(United States) Riessen	2	6	6	4
(South Africa) McMillan	6	7	4	6

Fourth round
(United States) Mayer	3	4	6	7	4
(South Africa) McMillan	6	6	3	6	6

=== Bottom half ===
==== Section 5 ====
Preliminary round
(South Africa) Ryan	6	5	6	3
(United States) McKinley	3	7	7	6
(Australia) Addison	7	3	4	7	4
(United States) Pasarell	5	6	6	5	6
(Italy) Barazzutti	4	4	2
(India) Amritraj	6	6	6
(United States) Neely	5	5	2
(United States) Gerulaitis	7	7	6
(Zimbabwe) Irvine	6	3	1	6	3
(United States) Hardie	1	6	6	3	6
(United States) Krulevitz	7	5	4	3
(France) N'Godrella	6	7	6	6
(Sweden) Bengtson	5	3	6	2
(Canada) Belkin	7	6	1	6
(Australia) Phillips-Moore	4	1	1
11	(South Africa) Drysdale	6	6	6
(Sweden) Borg	5	7	4	4
(Australia) Emerson	7	6	6	6
(United States) Fitzgibbon	6	4	2
(Australia) Stolle	7	6	6

First round
(United States) McKinley	3	4	6
(United States) Pasarell	6	6	7
(India) Amritraj	6	3	2	3
(United States) Gerulaitis	2	6	6	6
(United States) Hardie	2	6	3	4
(France) N'Godrella	6	4	6	6
(Canada) Belkin	5^{r}
11	(South Africa) Drysdale	5
(Australia) Emerson	7	4	2	2
(Australia) Stolle	6	6	6	6
(United States) Machette	1	7	6	6
(Czechoslovakia) Holeček	6	6	4	4
(United States) Dibbs	6	6	6	7
(United States) Borowiak	2	7	3	6
(Soviet Union) Kakulia	1	2	4
5	(Australia) Newcombe	6	6	6

Second round
(United States) Pasarell	7	6	6
(United States) Gerulaitis	6	3	2
(France) N'Godrella	3	6	1	4
11	(South Africa) Drysdale	6	4	6	6
(Australia) Stolle	6	6	6
(United States) Machette	3	4	3
(United States) Dibbs	3	4	3
5	(Australia) Newcombe	6	6	6

Third round
(United States) Pasarell	5	6	4	3
11	(South Africa) Drysdale	7	4	6	6
(Australia) Stolle	7	6	6
5	(Australia) Newcombe	6	4	3

Fourth round
11	(South Africa) Drysdale	6	6	4	6
(Australia) Stolle	4	7	6	7

==== Section 6 ====
First round
(Jamaica) Russell	4	6	6	3	4
(Czechoslovakia) Kukal	6	4	3	6	6
(United States) Dell	4	7	4	6
(Chile) Cornejo	6	5	6	7
(West Germany) Fassbender	6	7	6	6
(Colombia) Molina	4	6	4	3
(West Germany) Pohmann	4	2	2
16	(South Africa) Hewitt	6	6	6
(France) Dominguez	4	6	6	6
(United States) Gonzales	6	3	2	3
(United States) Reid	6	6	6
(United States) Osborne	4	2	4
(United Kingdom) Taylor	3	7	6	3	6
(Rhodesia) Pattison	6	6	3	6	3
(Colombia) Velasco Sr.	0	2	0
4	(Romania) Năstase	6	6	6

Second round
(Czechoslovakia) Kukal	3	4	2
(Chile) Cornejo	6	6	6
(West Germany) Fassbender	5	3	4
16	(South Africa) Hewitt	7	6	6
(France) Dominguez	5	6	7	6
(United States) Reid	7	4	5	4
(United Kingdom) Taylor	5	2	7	6	6
4	(Romania) Năstase	7	6	6	2	7

Third round
(Chile) Cornejo	4	4	6	1
16	(South Africa) Hewitt	6	6	3	6
(France) Dominguez	3	7	2	3
4	(Romania) Năstase	6	5	6	6

Fourth round
16	(South Africa) Hewitt	4	4	2
4	(Romania) Năstase	6	6	6

==== Section 7 ====
First round
(Japan) Sakai	6	7	6
(Japan) Kuki	2	5	4
(United Kingdom) Battrick	3	1	0
(Australia) Cooper	6	6	6
(New Zealand) Parun	4	6	6	6
(United States) Froehling	6	4	3	2
(New Zealand) Simpson	5	2	2
10	(Spain) Orantes	7	6	6
(Australia) Carmichael	6	6	7
(Australia) Doerner	4	4	6
(United States) Tanner	7	6	6
(Egypt) El Shafei	6	4	4
(Denmark) Ulrich	7	5	1	6
(United States) Solomon	6	7	6	7
(South Africa) Cramer	2	3	4
7	(Netherlands) Okker	6	6	6

Second round
(Japan) Sakai	3	3	2
(Australia) Cooper	6	6	6
(New Zealand) Parun	1	6	6	5	4
10	(Spain) Orantes	6	2	3	7	6
(Australia) Carmichael	6	5	3	6	6
(United States) Tanner	4	7	6	3	7
(United States) Solomon	1	2	2
7	(Netherlands) Okker	6	6	6

Third round
(Australia) Cooper	7	6	6
10	(Spain) Orantes	6	4	4
(United States) Tanner	6	3	7	6
7	(Netherlands) Okker	4	6	5	3

Fourth round
(Australia) Cooper	2	6	6
(United States) Tanner	6	7	7

==== Section 8 ====
First round
(Australia) Keldie	4	0	r
(Romania) Țiriac	6	1
(Ecuador) Zuleta	1	3	5
(Socialist Federal Republic of Yugoslavia) Pilić	6	6	7
(United States) McManus	2	4	6	6	6
(United States) Birchmore	6	6	1	4	3
(United States) Gorman	6	3	6	7	6
15	(United States) Connors	1	6	7	5	4
(Venezuela) Hose	7	4	7	7
(United States) Faulk	5	6	6	6
(United States) Stockton	6	6	6
(United States) Barth	4	2	4
(United Kingdom) Cox	6	6	6
(Czechoslovakia) Granát	4	1	3
(United Kingdom) Curtis	1	6	2
2	(Australia) Rosewall	6	7	6

Second round
(Romania) Țiriac	7	4	6	5	6
(Socialist Federal Republic of Yugoslavia) Pilić	6	6	3	7	7
(United States) McManus	6	4	1	3
(United States) Gorman	4	6	6	6
(Venezuela) Hose	2	3	6	6
(United States) Stockton	6	6	3	7
(United Kingdom) Cox	1	6	7	7
2	(Australia) Rosewall	6	3	6	6

Third round
(Socialist Federal Republic of Yugoslavia) Pilić	4	4	4
(United States) Gorman	6	6	6
(United States) Stockton	6	6	4	6	6
(United Kingdom) Cox	7	2	6	2	2

Fourth round
(United States) Gorman	6	6	6
(United States) Stockton	4	3	3

Preceded by 1972 Wimbledon Championships – Men's singles	Grand Slam men's singles	Succeeded by 1973 Australian Open – Men's singles
