= 1973 Australian Open – Men's singles =

Men's singles
- 1973 Australian Open

Final
- Champion: (Australia) John Newcombe
- Runner-up: (New Zealand) Onny Parun
- Score: 6–3, 6–7, 7–5, 6–1

Details
- Draw: 56
- Seeds: 12

Events
Singles	men	women		boys	girls
Doubles	men	women	mixed	boys	girls
WC Singles	men	women	quad
WC Doubles	men	women	quad
Legends	men	women	mixed
- Australian Open

John Newcombe defeated Onny Parun in the final, 6–3, 6–7, 7–5, 6–1 to win the men's singles tennis title at the 1973 Australian Open. It was his fifth major singles title.

Ken Rosewall was the two-time defending champion, but lost in the second round to Karl Meiler.

The first round was best-of-three sets, and the rest of the tournament was best-of-five sets.

== Seeds ==
The seeded players are listed below. John Newcombe is the champion; others show the round in which they were eliminated.

1. (Australia) Ken Rosewall (second round)
2. (Australia) John Newcombe (champion)
3. (Australia) Mal Anderson (second round)
4. (Soviet Union) Alex Metreveli (quarterfinals)
5. (Australia) Geoff Masters (third round)
6. (Australia) John Alexander (second round)
7. (Australia) Colin Dibley (second round)
8. (Australia) Allan Stone (third round)
9. (Australia) Barry Phillips-Moore (second round)
10. (Australia) Bob Carmichael (quarterfinals)
11. (France) Patrick Proisy (semifinals)
12. (New Zealand) Onny Parun (final)

== Draw ==
=== Key ===
- Q = Qualifier

=== Final eight ===
Quarterfinals
(West Germany) Karl Meiler	7	6	6	7
(France) Wanaro N'Godrella	6	7	3	6
4	(Soviet Union) Alex Metreveli	4	6	3	7	3
12	(New Zealand) Onny Parun	6	3	6	6	6
11	(France) Patrick Proisy	6	3	6	7
(Australia) John Cooper	4	6	1	6
10	(Australia) Bob Carmichael	4	6	3
2	(Australia) John Newcombe	6	7	6

Semifinals
(West Germany) Karl Meiler	6	3	5	1
12	(New Zealand) Onny Parun	2	6	7	6
11	(France) Patrick Proisy	6	4	2
2	(Australia) John Newcombe	7	6	6

Finals
12	(New Zealand) Onny Parun	3	7	5	1
2	(Australia) John Newcombe	6	6	7	6

=== Section 1 ===
First round
(West Germany) K Meiler	5	6	6
(Australia) J James	7	3	4
(Soviet Union) T Kakoulia	7	7
Q	(Hungary) R Machán	6	6
(Australia) S Ball	7	6
(Australia) N Fraser	5	2
Q	(Australia) M Phillips	6	6
(Japan) J Kuki	3	4
(France) W N'Godrella	6	6
(Australia) P Dent	3	4
(Australia) F Sedgman	4	6	2
9	(Australia) B Phillips-Moore	6	4	6

Second round
1	(Australia) K Rosewall	2	3	2
(West Germany) K Meiler	6	6	6
(Soviet Union) T Kakoulia	6	6	3	6
(Australia) S Ball	2	4	6	3
8	(Australia) A Stone	6	6	6
Q	(Australia) M Phillips	1	4	4
(France) W N'Godrella	6	7	7
9	(Australia) B Phillips-Moore	4	6	6

Third round
(West Germany) K Meiler	6	7	2	6
(Soviet Union) T Kakoulia	3	6	6	3
8	(Australia) A Stone	6	5	4	7	4
(France) W N'Godrella	3	7	6	5	6

Quarterfinals
(West Germany) K Meiler	7	6	6	7
(France) W N'Godrella	6	7	3	6

=== Section 2 ===
First round
Q	(Australia) M Senior	6	3	14
(Australia) K Warwick	4	6	12
(Australia) R Case	6	6
Q	(Australia) P Kronk	4	3
(West Germany) F Gebert	7	4	6
(Australia) A McDonald	6	6	3
(West Germany) H-J Plötz	6	3	7
(France) J-F Caujolle	0	6	5
Q	(Australia) C Kachel	6	6
(Australia) W Bowrey	2	3
(Austria) H Kary	4	6
12	(New Zealand) O Parun	6	7

Second round
4	(Soviet Union) A Metreveli	6	4	6	6
Q	(Australia) M Senior	2	6	2	2
(Australia) R Case	6	3	6	6
(West Germany) F Gebert	4	6	4	2
5	(Australia) G Masters	6	6	6
(West Germany) H-J Plötz	2	3	1
Q	(Australia) C Kachel	1	2	2
12	(New Zealand) O Parun	6	6	6

Third round
4	(Soviet Union) A Metreveli	4	6	6	7
(Australia) R Case	6	4	2	5
5	(Australia) G Masters	6	6	3	5
12	(New Zealand) O Parun	7	3	6	7

Quarterfinals
4	(Soviet Union) A Metreveli	4	6	3	7	3
12	(New Zealand) O Parun	6	3	6	6	6

=== Section 3 ===
First round
11	(France) P Proisy	7	3	6
Q	(Australia) W Durham	6	6	3
(Australia) W Coghlan	7	3	6
(Japan) J Kamiwazumi	6	6	3
(France) P Dominguez	7	6
(Hungary) B Taróczy	6	3
(Australia) J Cooper	6	6
(Australia) D Crealy	3	3
Q	(Australia) G Thomson	7	7
(France) T Bernasconi	6	6
(Australia) B Giltinan	6	6
(Australia) R Casey	1	2

Second round
11	(France) P Proisy	6	6	6
(Australia) W Coghlan	3	3	4
(France) P Dominguez	7	6	3	6	11
6	(Australia) J Alexander	6	7	6	3	9
(Australia) J Cooper	6	7	6
Q	(Australia) G Thomson	3	6	1
(Australia) B Giltinan	6	6	6	7
3	(Australia) M Anderson	7	2	2	6

Third round
11	(France) P Proisy	7	4	7	6
(France) P Dominguez	5	6	6	4
(Australia) J Cooper	7	6	4	6	13
(Australia) B Giltinan	5	2	6	7	11

Quarterfinals
11	(France) P Proisy	6	3	6	7
(Australia) J Cooper	4	6	1	6

=== Section 4 ===
First round
10	(Australia) B Carmichael	6	6
(Australia) J Bartlett	4	2
(Australia) J Stephens	6	3	8
Q	(Denmark) L Elvstrøm	4	6	6
(Hungary) S Baranyi	6	6	6
(Australia) C Stubs	7	3	2
(Australia) C Letcher	6	7
(Hungary) P Szőke	1	5
(France) G Goven	6	7
(Greece) N Kelaidis	2	6
(France) J-L Haillet	7	6
(Australia) G Perkins	5	4

Second round
10	(Australia) B Carmichael	6	6	6	6
(Australia) J Stephens	1	2	7	3
(Hungary) S Baranyi	3	6	6	7
7	(Australia) C Dibley	6	3	3	6
(Australia) C Letcher	3	2	7	6
(France) G Goven	6	6	6	7
(France) J-L Haillet	1	2	2
2	(Australia) J Newcombe	6	6	6

Third round
10	(Australia) B Carmichael	6	6	2	1	6
(Hungary) S Baranyi	3	4	6	6	3
(France) G Goven	1	3	3
2	(Australia) J Newcombe	6	6	6

Quarterfinals
10	(Australia) B Carmichael	4	6	3
2	(Australia) J Newcombe	6	7	6

Preceded by 1972 U.S. Open	Grand Slam men's singles	Succeeded by 1973 French Open
