= Ken Weatherley =

British tennis player

Ken Weatherley MBE
- Country (sports): Great Britain
- Born: 24 November 1947 (age 77)

Singles
- Career record: 63–91
- Career titles: 1

Grand Slam singles results
- Wimbledon: 1R (1972)

Doubles

Grand Slam doubles results
- Wimbledon: 2R (1972)

Kenneth Frank Weatherley (born 24 November 1947) is a British former professional tennis player.

== Career ==
He played his first tournament in 1963 at the Palace Hotel Covered Courts Championships in Torquay. Weatherley, a Surrey county player, was educated at the Millfield School and University of Cambridge. He made the main draw of the 1972 Wimbledon Championships.

His career singles highlights included winning his one and only title at the Les Diablerets International Championship in Switzerland in 1971. Additionally he was also a finalist at the Grantown-on-Spey Open in 1964. In 1971 he contested four other finals including the Torquay Open where he lost to Premjit Lall, the Ascona International where he lost to John de Mendoza, the Ilkley Open losing to Ray Keldie, and the Israel International Invitation where he was defeated by Hank Irvine. Weatherley played his final singles event in 1977 at the Tally-Ho! Open Tennis Championships.

A former Wimbledon committee member, he founded the charity Tennis First which helps fund young players. He was influential in getting funding for a 12-year old Emma Raducanu.
