= Tony Dawson (tennis) =

Australian-American tennis player

- Full name: Anthony Dawson
- Country (sports): Australia
- Born: 1950 (age 74–75); Sydney, Australia

Singles
- Career record: 2–8
- Highest ranking: No. 234 (30 Apr 1975)

Grand Slam singles results
- Australian Open: 1R (1968, 1975)
- French Open: Q3 (1975)
- Wimbledon: Q3 (1975)

Doubles
- Career record: 1–8

Grand Slam doubles results
- Australian Open: 1R (1973, 1975)
- Wimbledon: 2R (1972)

Anthony Dawson (born 1950) is an Australian-American former professional tennis player.

Dawson, born and raised in Sydney, played collegiate tennis in the United States for Oklahoma City University during the early 1970s. He featured twice in the singles main draw of the Australian Open and made the doubles second round of the 1972 Wimbledon Championships. In 1975 he had an upset win over Tom Gorman at a Houston WCT tournament.

Now living in Texas, Dawson competes on the ITF senior's circuit as an American.
