= Martin Koek =

Dutch tennis player

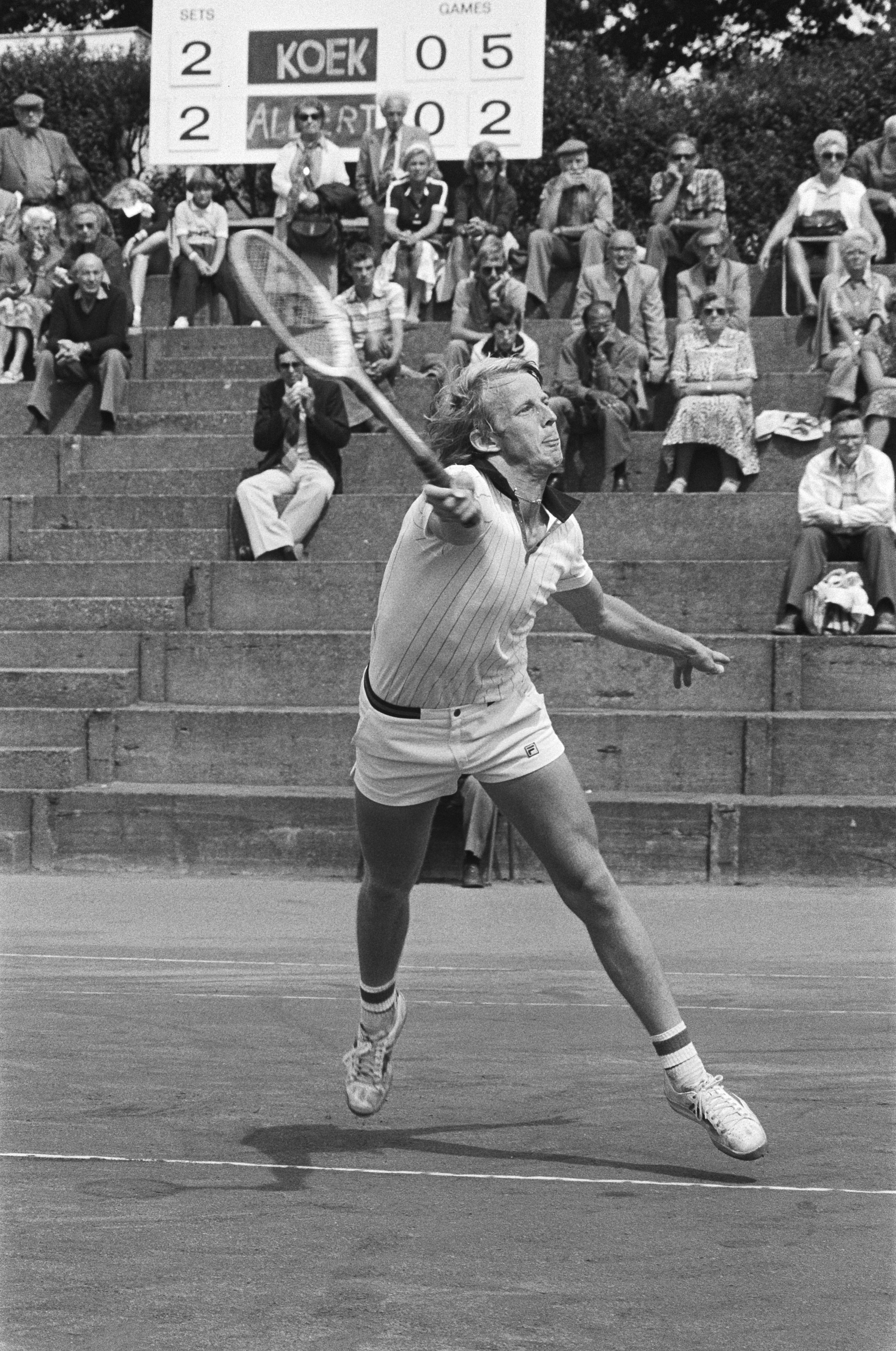
- Country (sports): Netherlands
- Born: 31 October 1952 (age 72)
- Plays: Right-handed

Singles
- Career record: 0–1
- Highest ranking: No. 555 (31 December 1978)

Doubles
- Career record: 0–1

Grand Slam doubles results
- Australian Open: 1R (1973)

Martin Koek (born 31 October 1952) is a Dutch former professional tennis player.

A right-handed player, Koek reached a career high singles ranking of 555 in the world.

Koek is most notable for his appearance in the men's doubles main draw at the 1973 Australian Open. His partner was Australian veteran Frank Sedgman, who he had spent the summer training with.

During his career he won two Dutch national championships, one for mixed doubles in 1979 and the other a men's doubles title in 1983.
