= Georges Goven =

French tennis player (born 1948)

- Country (sports): France
- Residence: Paris, France
- Born: 26 April 1948 (age 77); Lyon, France
- Height: 1.73 m (5 ft 8 in)
- Turned pro: 1968 (amateur from 1965)
- Retired: 1984
- Plays: Right-handed (one-handed backhand)

Singles
- Career record: 162–209
- Career titles: 1
- Highest ranking: No. 13 (30 November 1970)

Grand Slam singles results
- Australian Open: 3R (1965, 1973)
- French Open: SF (1970)
- Wimbledon: 3R (1966, 1972)
- US Open: 3R (1975)

Doubles
- Career record: 83–129
- Career titles: 1

Grand Slam doubles results
- Australian Open: 1R (1973)
- French Open: SF (1970)
- Wimbledon: 2R (1969, 1971, 1972)
- US Open: 2R (1969, 1970, 1971, 1972, 1973)

Georges Goven (born 26 April 1948) is a retired tennis player from France.

== Tennis career ==
=== Juniors ===
As a junior, he won the Australian Championships Boys' Singles title in 1964.

=== Amateur / Pro tour ===
Goven reached the semifinals in both singles and doubles (partnering François Jauffret) at the 1970 French Open.

He notably defeated Ilie Năstase (then world No. 7) in Paris in September 1977 with the help of the spaghetti racquet, and Vitas Gerulaitis (then world No. 5) in Florence in May 1983.

== After retirement ==
Goven has coached such players as Nicolas Escudé, Nathalie Dechy and Tatiana Golovin. He was the Davis Cup team captain from 1993 to 1994. Currently, he is the captain of the France Fed Cup team since 2005 (replacing his compatriot and former player Guy Forget) and coaches Kristina Mladenovic.

== Career finals ==
=== Doubles (1 title, 6 runner-ups) ===
Result	W/L	Date	Tournament	Surface	Partner	Opponents	Score
Win	1–0	Apr 1971	Palermo, Italy	Clay	(France) Pierre Barthès	(Romania) Ilie Năstase (Romania) Ion Țiriac	6–2, 6–3
Loss	1–1	Feb 1972	Des Moines, US	Carpet (i)	(Brazil) Thomaz Koch	(United States) Jim Osborne (United States) Jim McManus	2–6, 3–6
Loss	1–2	Apr 1972	Johannesburg, South Africa	Clay	(South Africa) Ray Moore	(South Africa) Bob Hewitt (South Africa) Frew McMillan	2–6, 2–6, 4–6
Loss	1–3	Dec 1972	Brisbane, Australia	Grass	(France) Wanaro N'Godrella	(Australia) Ross Case (Australia) Geoff Masters	2–6, 7–6, 2–6, 6–7
Loss	1–4	Apr 1973	Monte Carlo, Monaco	Clay	(France) Patrick Proisy	(Spain) Juan Gisbert (Romania) Ilie Năstase	2–6, 2–6, 2–6
Loss	1–5	Jan 1974	Philadelphia WCT, US	Carpet (i)	(France) Jean-Baptiste Chanfreau	(South Africa) Pat Cramer (United States) Mike Estep	1–6, 1–6
Loss	1–6	Aug 1974	Bretton Woods, US	Clay	(France) François Jauffret	(United States) Jeff Borowiak (Australia) Rod Laver	3–6, 2–6
