= 1972 Wimbledon Championships =

- Date: 26 June – 9 July
- Edition: 86th
- Category: Grand Slam
- Prize money: £50,330
- Surface: Grass
- Location: Church Road; SW19, Wimbledon, London, United Kingdom
- Venue: All England Lawn Tennis and Croquet Club

Champions

Men's singles
- (United States) Stan Smith

Women's singles
- (United States) Billie Jean King

Men's doubles
- (South Africa) Bob Hewitt / (South Africa) Frew McMillan

Women's doubles
- (United States) Billie Jean King / (Netherlands) Betty Stöve

Mixed doubles
- (Romania) Ilie Năstase / (United States) Rosie Casals

Boys' singles
- (Sweden) Björn Borg

Girls' singles
- (South Africa) Ilana Kloss
- Wimbledon Championships

The 1972 Wimbledon Championships was a tennis tournament that took place on the outdoor grass courts at the All England Lawn Tennis and Croquet Club in Wimbledon, London, United Kingdom. The tournament was scheduled to be held from Monday 26 June until Saturday 8 July 1972 but rain on the final Saturday meant that the men's singles, women's doubles and mixed doubles finals were played on Sunday 9 July. It was the first time in the tournament's history that finals were played on a Sunday. It was the 86th staging of the Wimbledon Championships, and the third Grand Slam tennis event of 1972.

Due to the International Lawn Tennis Federation (ILTF) ban on World Championship Tennis (WCT) contract players competing in their tournaments, the reigning men's singles champion John Newcombe was prevented from defending his title. Other players banned from competing included Rod Laver, Ken Rosewall and Arthur Ashe. First-seeded Stan Smith and second-seeded Billie Jean King won the men's and women's singles titles respectively.

== Prize money ==
The total prize money for the 1972 championships was £50,330. The winner of the men's title earned £5,000 while the women's singles champion earned £2,400.

Event	W	F	SF	QF	Round of 16	Round of 32	Round of 64	Round of 128
Men's singles	£5,000	£3,000	£1,000	£550	£300	£200	£125	£100
Women's singles	£2,400	£1,330	£600	£350	£200	£150	£100	£75
Men's doubles *	£1,000	£600	£400	£200	£0	£0	£0	—N/a
Women's doubles *	£600	£400	£200	£100	£0	£0	£0	—N/a
Mixed doubles *	£500	£350	£175	£100	£0	£0	£0	£0

_{* per team}

== Champions ==
=== Seniors ===
==== Men's singles ====
(United States) Stan Smith defeated (Romania) Ilie Năstase, 4–6, 6–3, 6–3, 4–6, 7–5

- It was Smith's 2nd (and last) career Grand Slam title, and his only Wimbledon title.

==== Women's singles ====
(United States) Billie Jean King defeated (Australia) Evonne Goolagong, 6–3, 6–3

- It was King's 8th career Grand Slam title (her 4th in the Open Era), and her 4th Wimbledon title.

==== Men's doubles ====
(South Africa) Bob Hewitt / (South Africa) Frew McMillan defeated (United States) Stan Smith / (United States) Erik van Dillen, 6–2, 6–2, 9–7

==== Women's doubles ====
(United States) Billie Jean King / (Netherlands) Betty Stöve defeated (France) Françoise Dürr / (Australia) Judy Dalton, 6–2, 4–6, 6–3

==== Mixed doubles ====
(Romania) Ilie Năstase / (United States) Rosie Casals defeated (Australia) Kim Warwick / (Australia) Evonne Goolagong, 6–4, 6–4

=== Juniors ===
==== Boys' singles ====
(Sweden) Björn Borg defeated (United Kingdom) Buster Mottram, 6–3, 4–6, 7–5

==== Girls' singles ====
(South Africa) Ilana Kloss defeated (United Kingdom) Glynis Coles, 6–4, 4–6, 6–4

== Singles seeds ==
=== Men's singles ===
1. (United States) Stan Smith (champion)
2. (Romania) Ilie Năstase (final, lost to Stan Smith)
3. (Spain) Manuel Orantes (semifinals, lost to Ilie Năstase)
4. (Spain) Andrés Gimeno (second round, lost to Onny Parun)
5. (Czechoslovakia) Jan Kodeš (semifinals, lost to Stan Smith)
6. (France) Pierre Barthès (fourth round, lost to Colin Dibley)
7. (South Africa) Bob Hewitt (first round, lost to Jimmy Connors)
8. (Soviet Union) Alex Metreveli (quarterfinals, lost to Stan Smith)

=== Women's singles ===
1. (Australia) Evonne Goolagong (final, lost to Billie Jean King)
2. (United States) Billie Jean King (champion)
3. (United States) Nancy Richey (quarterfinals, lost to Rosie Casals)
4. (United States) Chris Evert (semifinals, lost to Evonne Goolagong)
5. (Australia) Kerry Melville (third round, lost to Patti Hogan)
6. (United States) Rosie Casals (semifinals, lost to Billie Jean King)
7. (United Kingdom) Virginia Wade (quarterfinals, lost to Billie Jean King)
8. (France) Françoise Dürr (quarterfinals, lost to Evonne Goolagong)

Preceded by 1972 French Open	Grand Slams	Succeeded by 1972 US Open
