= 1971 Campionati Internazionali di Sicilia =

- Date: 12–18 April
- Edition: 23rd
- Category: Grand Prix
- Draw: 36S / 16D
- Prize money: $12,500
- Surface: Clay / outdoor
- Location: Palermo, Italy

Champions

Singles
- (United Kingdom) Roger Taylor

Doubles
- (France) Georges Goven / (France) Pierre Barthès
- Campionati Internazionali di Sicilia

The 1971 Campionati Internazionali di Sicilia, also known as the Palermo Open, was a men's tennis tournament played on outdoor clay courts in Palermo, Italy that was part of the Group C category of the 1971 Grand Prix circuit. It was the 23rd edition of the tournament and was held from 12 April until 18 April 1971. Roger Taylor won the singles title.

== Finals ==
=== Singles ===
(United Kingdom) Roger Taylor defeated (France) Pierre Barthès 6–3, 4–6, 7–6, 6–2

=== Doubles ===
(France) Georges Goven / (France) Pierre Barthès defeated (Romania) Ilie Năstase / (Romania) Ion Țiriac 6–2, 6–3
