= Les Diablerets International Championship =

Les Diablerets International Championship Championnat International des Diablerets

Defunct tennis tournament
- Tour: Swiss LTA Circuit (1899-1912); ILTF Circuit (1913-71)
- Founded: 1885; 141 years ago
- Abolished: 1971; 55 years ago
- Location: Les Diablerets, Ormont-Dessus, Vaud, Switzerland.
- Venue: Tennis Club Les Diablerets
- Surface: Clay

The Les Diablerets International Championship or Championnat International des Diablerets was men's and women's clay court tennis tournament founded in July 1885, as the Les Diablerets International Lawn Tennis Tournament. It was first played at the Le Grand Hôtel et les Diablerets then moved later to the Tennis Club Les Diablerets, Les Diablerets, Ormont-Dessus, Vaud, Switzerland. The tournament was staged annually as part of the ILTF Circuit until 1971.

== History ==
On 27 July 1885 the first Les Diablerets International Lawn Tennis Tournament was held the men's singles event was won by British player Robert Henry Legge. It was first played at the Le Grand Hôtel et les Diablerets then moved later to the Tennis Club Les Diablerets. The winner of the women's singles was won by Miss. N J Salamis. Swiss player Dimitri Sturdza won four tiles between 1966 and 1969. The tournament was run annually until 1971 the final men's singles champion was Ken Weatherley.
