= 1972 Wimbledon Championships – Girls' singles =

Girls' singles
- 1972 Wimbledon Championships

Final
- Champion: (South Africa) Ilana Kloss
- Runner-up: (United Kingdom) Glynis Coles
- Score: 6–4, 4–6, 6–4

Details
- Draw: 19

Events
Singles	men	women		boys	girls
Doubles	men	women	mixed	boys	girls
← 1971 ·	Wimbledon Championships	· 1973 →

Ilana Kloss defeated Glynis Coles in the final, 6–4, 4–6, 6–4 to win the girls' singles tennis title at the 1972 Wimbledon Championships.

== Draw ==
=== Key ===
- Q = Qualifier
- WC = Wild card
- LL = Lucky loser
- Alt = Alternate
- SE = Special exempt
- PR = Protected ranking
- ITF = ITF entry
- JE = Junior exempt
- w/o = Walkover
- r = Retired
- d = Defaulted
- SR = Special ranking

=== Finals ===
Semifinals
(South Africa) Ilana Kloss	6	6
(Sweden) I Larsson	2	3
(Republic of Ireland) Sue Minford	8	1	5
(United Kingdom) Glynis Coles	6	6	7

Final
(South Africa) Ilana Kloss	6	4	6
(United Kingdom) Glynis Coles	4	6	4

=== Top half ===
First round
(Sweden) I Larsson	8	7
(Socialist Federal Republic of Yugoslavia) Mima Jaušovec	6	5
(United States) Laurie Tenney	6	6
(Belgium) A Poelmans	3	1

Second round
(Austria) S Beregger	1	1
(South Africa) I Kloss	6	6
(Denmark) HS Andersen	9	6
(Japan) Naoko Sato	7	2
(Spain) Mónica Álvarez de Mon	8	6
(Switzerland) M Jeanneret	6	1
(Sweden) I Larsson	4	6	7
(United States) L Tenney	6	4	5

Quarterfinals
(South Africa) I Kloss	6	6
(Denmark) HS Andersen	3	0
(Spain) M Álvarez de Mon	5	1
(Sweden) I Larsson	7	6

Semifinals
(South Africa) I Kloss	6	6
(Sweden) I Larsson	2	3

=== Bottom half ===
First round
(Poland) Elżbieta Ślesicka	w/o
(Norway) T Tenman

Second round
(Norway) T Tenman	1	1
(Republic of Ireland) Sue Minford	6	6
(Finland) Elina Durchman	4	8	7
(Canada) A Straub	6	6	5
(West Germany) B Kasler	3	3
(United Kingdom) Glynis Coles	6	6
(Netherlands) J Groten	1	2
(Czechoslovakia) Renáta Tomanová	6	6

Quarterfinals
(Republic of Ireland) S Minford	6	6
(Finland) E Durchman	2	1
(United Kingdom) G Coles	6	6
(Czechoslovakia) R Tomanová	4	2

Semifinals
(Republic of Ireland) S Minford	8	1	5
(United Kingdom) G Coles	6	6	7
