= John de Mendoza =

British tennis player

- Country (sports): Great Britain
- Born: 22 August 1949 (age 75); Wimbledon, England

Singles
- Career record: 11–13

Grand Slam singles results
- French Open: 3R (1972)
- Wimbledon: 1R (1971, 1972)

Doubles
- Career record: 1–3

Grand Slam doubles results
- Wimbledon: 2R (1972)

Grand Slam mixed doubles results
- Wimbledon: 1R (1972)

John de Mendoza (born 22 August 1949) is a British former professional tennis player.

A British top-10 player, de Mendoza was active on the international tour in the 1970s. He featured in the singles main draws of both the French Open and Wimbledon during his career. In 1972 he had an upset win over Clark Graebner in the semifinals of the Welsh Championships and finished tournament runner-up to Andrew Pattison.
