= Andrés Gimeno =

Spanish tennis player (1937–2019)

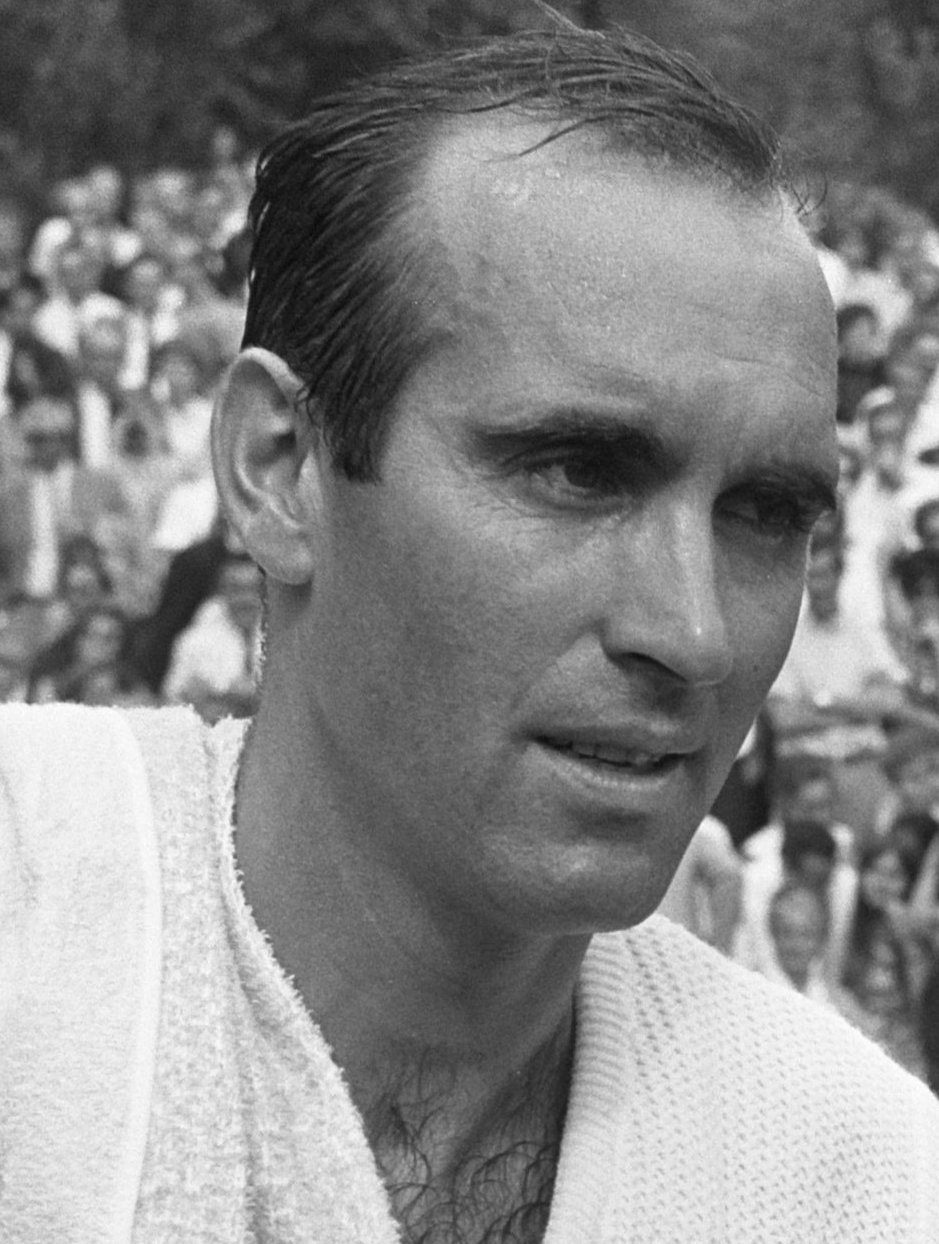
- Country (sports): Spain
- Born: 3 August 1937 Barcelona, Spain
- Died: 9 October 2019 (aged 82) Barcelona, Spain
- Height: 1.85 m (6 ft 1 in)
- Turned pro: 1960
- Retired: 1974
- Plays: Right-handed (one-handed backhand)
- Int. Tennis HoF: 2009 (member page)

Singles
- Career record: 935-535 (63.6%)
- Career titles: 41 (11 open era titles listed by ATP)

Grand Slam singles results
- Australian Open: F (1969)
- French Open: W (1972)
- Wimbledon: SF (1970)
- US Open: 4R (1969, 1972)

Other tournaments
- Tour Finals: RR (1972)
- Professional majors
- US Pro: F (1967)
- Wembley Pro: F (1965)
- French Pro: F (1962, 1967)

Doubles
- Career record: 94–60
- Career titles: 3

Grand Slam doubles results
- French Open: F (1960)
- Wimbledon: QF (1959)
- US Open: F (1968)

Andrés Gimeno Tolaguera (3 August 1937 – 9 October 2019) was a Spanish tennis player. His greatest achievement came in 1972, when he won the French Open and became the oldest first-time major champion in the Open Era at 34 years of age.

== Early years ==
Andrés came from a family which loved tennis, and his father Esteban supported his efforts to play the game. Esteban had been a good tennis player and he became Andres' coach. They practiced at Real Club de Tenis Barcelona. At an early age Andres started to become a really good tennis player, winning some important tournaments in his region. At age sixteen, he won the U-18 Championship of Spain. In 1954, he won the Championship of Spain in the doubles category playing with Juan Manuel Couder. At the same time, he stopped studying to focus on his tennis career.

He was not only a successful tennis player in Spain, but also represented his country throughout Europe. He played in the Galea's Cup, the European Championship U21, and won it in 1956 and 1957. He was the runner-up in 1958. After that, he decided to go to Australia to play with the man who was considered the best tennis coach in the world, Harry Hopman. He improved his tennis level and soon, he had two important victories in the championships in Perth and in Sydney.

== Tennis career ==
Gimeno went back to Spain in 1960 where he then had his best year as an amateur, winning the titles in Barcelona, Caracas, Monte Carlo, and at Queen's Club. In Barcelona, he became the first Spanish player to win the Torneo Conde de Godó, beating the Italian player Giuseppe Merlo. That same year he reached the doubles final of the French Open too, losing to an Australian duo. After that year, he joined the professional group World Championship Tennis, where Jack Kramer offered him $50,000 for three years, and more money for each victory. The group consisted of some of the best tennis players in history such as Rod Laver, Pancho Gonzales and Ken Rosewall.

Gimeno won the Pörtschach pro tournament in August 1963 beating Rosewall and Frank Sedgman. He also won the Genoa Pro in September 1963 beating Laver and Rosewall. Gimeno won the College Park Pro Championships in May 1964 beating Lew Hoad in the final. He won tournaments in Noordwijk and Munich in August and September 1964 beating Laver and Rosewall in both events. Gimeno won the Milan Pro in September 1965 over Laver and Rosewall and beat Laver in the final of the pro event at Port Elizabeth in October 1965. Gimeno won the US Pro hardcourt event at St. Louis in June 1966 beating Laver in the final. He won the World pro championships in Oklahoma City in July 1966 beating Laver and Rosewall. He also won the Geneva and Barcelona pro tournaments in September 1966 (both over Laver). He won the Cincinnati Pro in July 1967 beating Laver and Rosewall. In September 1967, Gimeno won the Border Pro at Selborne (over Rosewall and Fred Stolle) and the Eastern Province Pro at Port Elizabeth (over Laver and Rosewall).

Gimeno's greatest Grand Slam success as a singles player came after the Open era started in 1968 and professionals were allowed to participate in the Grand Slams. At the first ever such tournament featuring professionals, the 1968 French Open, Gimeno reached the semifinals. The following year, he reached the final of the Australian Open, where he lost to Rod Laver in three sets. Gimeno won events in Barcelona, Cologne, and New York in 1969, Dallas in 1970, and Hamburg in 1971. He also reached the semifinals at Wimbledon in 1970.

Gimeno's best year was in 1972, when he was a finalist in Brussels and Paris, and won in Los Angeles, Eastbourne, Gstaad, and at the French Open—his first and only Grand Slam championship. He held the record for the oldest male player to win the French Open (at the age of 34) until 2022, and remains the oldest first-time Grand Slam champion. In the final, he beat the French player Patrick Proisy in four sets. In 1973, he reached the final of the Dutch Open in Hilversum, where Tom Okker beat him in five sets.

Gimeno was an active Davis Cup player, recording an 18–5 singles record and 5–5 doubles record. His debut was in the match that Spain played against Egypt with one of the most important players in Spain, Manuel Santana. He could not play the competition while he was a part of the professional group, but he participated as coach in 1966. In 1973, he injured his meniscus and decided to quit playing tennis. He became the tennis coach in the RFET, Tennis' Spanish Federation and then in the Suisse Federation.

== After retiring from tennis ==
After his professional career, he decided to join the tennis circuit for retired players called Legends Championship. He also founded a tennis club in 1974 called "Club de Tenis Andres Gimeno" in Castelldefels, Barcelona.

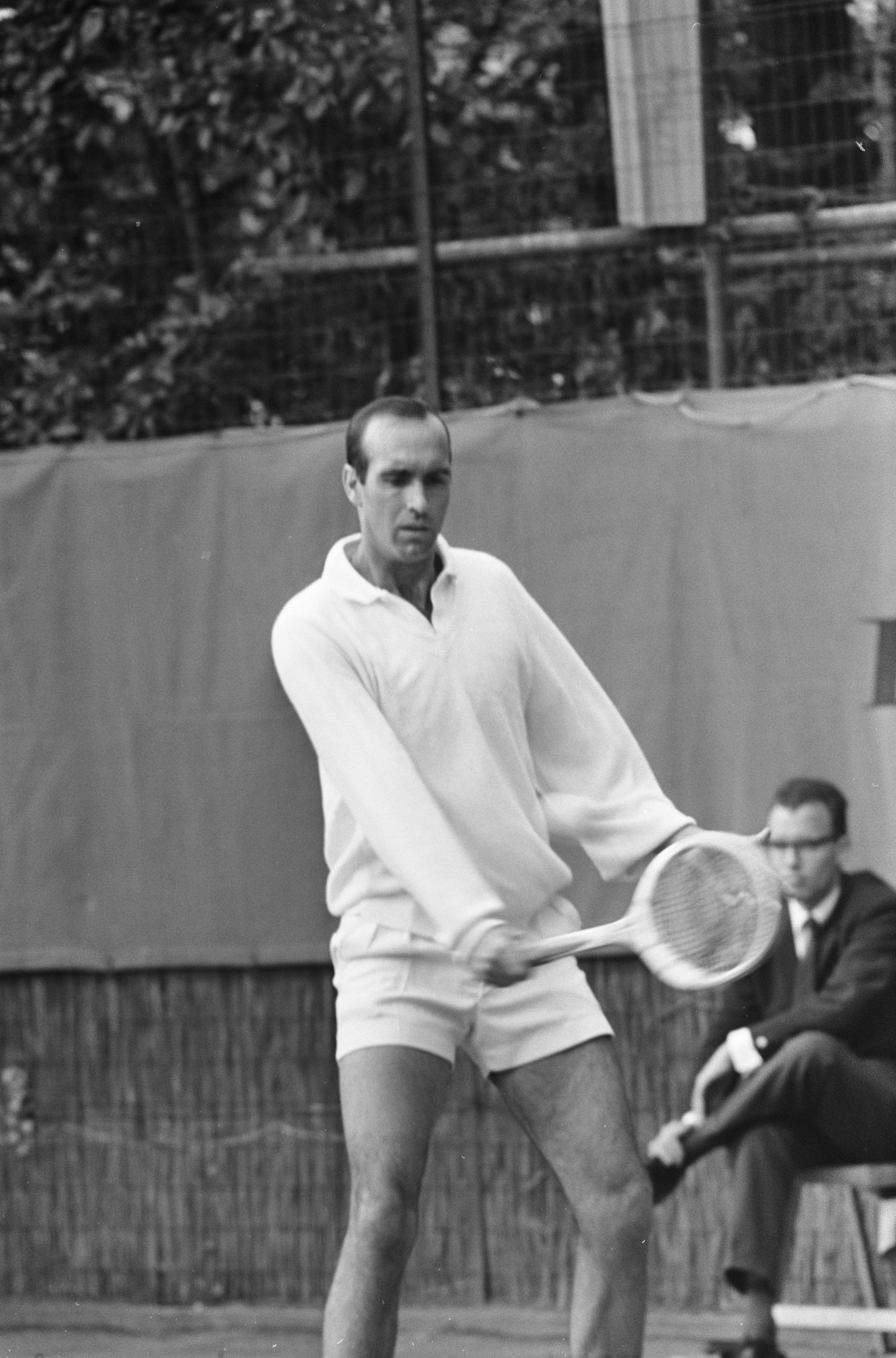
Gimeno, 1969

He was elected to the International Tennis Hall of Fame in 2009, becoming the fourth Spanish tennis player in it, after Arantxa Sánchez Vicario, Manuel Alonso and Manuel Santana.

== Personal life ==
Gimeno married Cristina Corolla in 1962 and together they had three children: Alejo Gimeno, Andrés Gimeno Jr. and Cristina Gimeno. In 2011, Gimeno lost all his money, and some of the best Spanish tennis players such as Rafael Nadal, Tommy Robredo, Feliciano López and David Ferrer played an exhibition tennis tournament in Palau Blaugrana to raise funds for him.

== Death ==
Gimeno died following a long illness, on 9 October 2019, at the age of 82.

== Grand Slam finals ==
=== Singles: 2 (1 title, 1 runner-up) ===
Result	Year	Championship	Surface	Opponent	Score
Loss	1969	Australian Open	Grass	(Australia) Rod Laver	3–6, 4–6, 5–7
Win	1972	French Open	Clay	(France) Patrick Proisy	4–6, 6–3, 6–1, 6–1

=== Doubles: 2 (2 runner-ups) ===
Result	Year	Championship	Surface	Partner	Opponents	Score
Loss	1960	French Championships	Clay	(Spain) José Luis Arilla	(Australia) Roy Emerson (Australia) Neale Fraser	2–6, 10–8, 5–7, 4–6
Loss	1968	US Open	Grass	(United States) Arthur Ashe	(United States) Bob Lutz (United States) Stan Smith	9–11, 1–6, 5–7

- Stats per ATP website bio

== Open Era career finals ==
Legend
Grand Slam (1)
Tennis Masters Cup (0)
ATP Tour (10)

=== Singles (11 wins, 13 losses) ===
Result	W/L	Date	Tournament	Surface	Opponent	Score
Win	1–0	Mar 1968	Bogotá NTL, Colombia	Clay (i)	(Australia) Fred Stolle	11–13, 6–3, 6–4
Loss	1–1	Apr 1968	Paris NTL, France	Hard (i)	(Australia) Ken Rosewall	3–6, 4–6
Win	2–1	Aug 1968	Binghamton NTL, US	Hard	(Australia) Fred Stolle	6–4, 6–1
Loss	2–2	Aug 1968	Fort Worth NTL, US	Hard	(Australia) Ken Rosewall	4–6, 3–6
Loss	2–3	Oct 1968	Corpus Christi NTL, US	Hard	(Australia) Rod Laver	2–6, 4–6
Loss	2–4	Oct 1968	São Paulo NTL-2, Brazil	Clay (i)	(Australia) Rod Laver	2–6, 6–2, 3–6
Loss	2–5	Oct 1968	La Paz NTL, Bolivia	Clay	(Australia) Rod Laver	4–6, 6–3, 5–7
Loss	2–6	Oct 1968	Lima NTL, Peru	Clay	(Australia) Fred Stolle	6–2, 2–6, 3–6
Loss	2–7	Jan 1969	Australian Open, Australia	Grass	(Australia) Rod Laver	3–6, 4–6, 5–7
Win	3–7	Mar 1969	New York-1, US	Carpet (i)	(United States) Arthur Ashe	6–1, 6–2, 3–6, 6–8, 9–7
Loss	3–8	May 1969	Amsterdam, Netherlands	Clay	(Netherlands) Tom Okker	4–6, 3–6
Win	4–8	Oct 1969	Cologne, Germany	Hard (i)	(Australia) Roy Emerson	6–3, 19–17
Win	5–8	Nov 1969	Barcelona-2, Spain	Clay	(Australia) Rod Laver	10–8, 2–6, 3–6, 6–4, 6–1
Loss	5–9	Feb 1970	Hollywood, Florida, US	Clay	(Australia) Ken Rosewall	6–3, 2–6, 6–3, 6–7, 3–6
Win	6–9	Apr 1970	Dallas, US	Carpet (i)	(Australia) Roy Emerson	6–2, 6–3, 6–2
Loss	6–10	Jun 1970	Casablanca, Morocco	Clay	(Australia) John Newcombe	4–6, 4–6, 4–6
Win	7–10	May 1971	Hamburg Open, Germany	Clay	(Hungary) Péter Szőke	6–3, 6–2, 6–2
Win	8–10	Feb 1972	Los Angeles, US	Hard (i)	(France) Pierre Barthès	6–3, 2–6, 6–3
Loss	8–11	May 1972	Brussels, Belgium	Clay	(Spain) Manuel Orantes	4–6, 1–6, 6–2, 5–7
Win	9–11	May 1972	French Open, Paris	Clay	(France) Patrick Proisy	4–6, 6–3, 6–1, 6–1
Win	10–11	Jun 1972	Eastbourne, England	Grass	(France) Pierre Barthès	7–5, 6–3
Win	11–11	Jul 1972	Gstaad, Switzerland	Clay	(Italy) Adriano Panatta	7–5, 9–8, 6–4
Loss	11–12	Oct 1972	Paris, France	Hard (i)	(United States) Stan Smith	2–6, 2–6, 5–7
Loss	11–13	Jul 1973	Hilversum, Netherlands	Clay	(Netherlands) Tom Okker	6–2, 4–6, 4–6, 7–6, 3–6

Source: ATP

== Performance timeline ==
Key
W	F	SF	QF	#R	RR	Q#	DNQ	A	NH

(W) winner; (F) finalist; (SF) semifinalist; (QF) quarterfinalist; (#R) rounds 4, 3, 2, 1; (RR) round-robin stage; (Q#) qualification round; (DNQ) did not qualify; (A) absent; (NH) not held; (SR) strike rate (events won / competed); (W–L) win–loss record.

Tournament	Amateur					Pro	Open Era						SR	W–L	Win %
Tournament	1956	1957	1958	1959	1960	1961–67	1968	1969	1970	1971	1972	1973	SR	W–L	Win %
Grand Slam tournaments
Australian Championships/Open	A	A	A	QF	A	banned		F	A	2R	A	A	0 / 3	6–3	66.67
French Championships/Open	1R	3R	4R	A	QF	banned	SF	QF	A	A	W	2R	1 / 8	23–7	76.67
Wimbledon	3R	1R	2R	3R	2R	banned	3R	4R	SF	1R	2R	A	0 / 10	17–10	62.96
US National Championships/Open	A	A	A	A	A	banned	1R	4R	1R	A	4R	A	0 / 4	6–4	60.00
Win–loss	2–2	2–2	4–2	4–2	4–2	n/a	7–3	14–4	5–2	0–2	10–2	1–1	1 / 25	52–24	68.42
Year-end championships
The Masters	Not held								A	A	RR	A	0 / 1	0–3	0.00
Win–loss	–								–	–	0–3	–	0 / 1	0–3	0.00

=== Professional Grand Slams ===
Tournament	1960	1961	1962	1963	1964	1965	1966	1967	SR	W–L	Win %
US Pro Championships	A	SF	A	A	SF	A	SF	F	0 / 4	4–4	50.00
French Pro Championship	QF	QF	F	1R	SF	QF	SF	F	0 / 8	10–8	55.55
Wembley Championships	QF	QF	QF	QF	QF	F	QF	SF	0 / 8	8–8	50.00
Win–loss	2–2	2–3	4–2	1–2	2–3	2–2	2–3	7–3	0 / 20	22–20	52.38
