= Onny Parun =

New Zealand tennis player (born 1947)

Onny Parun OBE
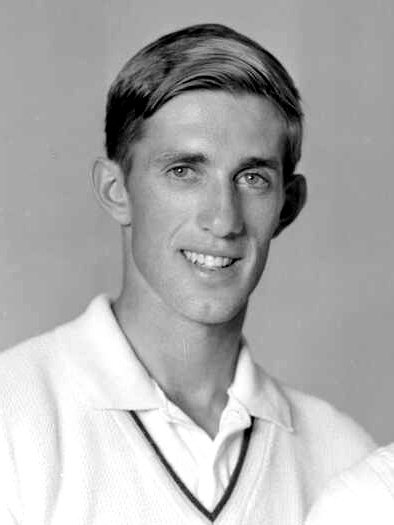
- Parun in the mid 1960s
- Country (sports): New Zealand
- Residence: Wellington, New Zealand
- Born: 15 April 1947 (age 79) Wellington, New Zealand
- Height: 188 cm (6 ft 2 in)
- Turned pro: 1969 (amateur from 1967)
- Retired: 1982
- Plays: Right-handed (one-handed backhand)

Singles
- Career record: 1007–572
- Career titles: 30
- Highest ranking: No. 18 (16 September 1975)

Grand Slam singles results
- Australian Open: F (1973)
- French Open: QF (1975)
- Wimbledon: QF (1971, 1972)
- US Open: QF (1973)

Other tournaments
- Tour Finals: RR (1974)

Doubles
- Career record: 162–221
- Career titles: 2

Grand Slam doubles results
- Australian Open: 3R (1974)
- French Open: W (1974)
- Wimbledon: 3R (1969, 1970, 1977)
- US Open: QF (1971)

Onny Parun OBE (born 15 April 1947) is a former tennis player of Croatian descent from New Zealand, who was among the world's top 20 for five years. Parun made the final of the Australian Open in 1973, losing to John Newcombe in four sets. He was also a quarterfinalist at Wimbledon in 1971 and 1972, the US Open in 1973, and the French Open in 1975. Parun eventually went on to coach the Bhatti brothers.

Parun and Australian Dick Crealy won the French Open doubles title in 1974. He also made the Masters in 1974, qualifying by finishing in the top eight on the grand prix table. Parun played Davis Cup from 1966 to 1982 and won a string of national titles, including the Benson and Hedges Open three times in four years.

Parun became the second player from New Zealand to reach a Grand Slam Singles final, 62 years after Anthony Wilding had reached the 1913 Wimbledon final, and Parun became the second player from New Zealand to win a Grand Slam Doubles title, 61 years after Wilding had won the 1914 Wimbledon doubles title and was also the last player from New Zealand to reach the finals of a Grand Slam Doubles title before Michael Venus was successful in the 2017 French Open.

Parun reached his career-high ATP singles ranking on 5 March 1975, when he became World No. 19. His brother, Tony Parun, also played professional tennis.

In September 1974, he defeated Jimmy Connors in San Francisco to end the No. 1 world ranked player's run of 160 weeks atop the ATP rankings.

In the 1982 Queen's Birthday Honours, Parun was appointed an Officer of the Order of the British Empire, for services to tennis. Since retiring from competition, Parun has been a coach, and trades shares on the US share market.

In 2023, his younger brother Melvin Joseph Parun (aged 68y) was killed in the Loafers Lodge fire.

== Grand Slam finals ==
=== Singles (1 runner-up) ===
Result	Year	Championship	Surface	Opponent	Score
Loss	1973	Australian Open	Grass	(Australia) John Newcombe	3–6, 7–6, 5–7, 1–6

=== Doubles (1 title) ===
Result	Year	Championship	Surface	Partner	Opponents	Score
Win	1974	French Open	Clay	(Australia) Dick Crealy	(United States) Robert Lutz (United States) Stanley Smith	6–3, 6–2, 3–6, 5–7, 6–1

== Grand Slam tournament performance timeline ==
Key
W	F	SF	QF	#R	RR	Q#	DNQ	A	NH

(W) winner; (F) finalist; (SF) semifinalist; (QF) quarterfinalist; (#R) rounds 4, 3, 2, 1; (RR) round-robin stage; (Q#) qualification round; (DNQ) did not qualify; (A) absent; (NH) not held; (SR) strike rate (events won / competed); (W–L) win–loss record.

=== Singles ===
Tournament	1966	1967	1968	1969	1970	1971	1972	1973	1974	1975	1976	1977		1978	1979	1980	1981	1982	SR
Australian Open	A	A	A	A	A	A	A	F	3R	A	A	A	1R	A	A	1R	1R	A	0 / 5
French Open	A	A	1R	1R	1R	1R	2R	3R	4R	QF	A	1R		1R	A	1R	1R	1R	0 / 13
Wimbledon	Q1	2R	3R	2R	1R	QF	QF	A	1R	3R	4R	3R		1R	2R	4R	A	A	0 / 13
US Open	A	A	A	1R	2R	3R	3R	QF	2R	3R	1R	3R		A	1R	1R	A	A	0 / 11
Strike rate	0 / 0	0 / 1	0 / 2	0 / 3	0 / 3	0 / 3	0 / 3	0 / 3	0 / 4	0 / 3	0 / 2	0 / 4		0 / 2	0 / 2	0 / 4	0 / 2	0 / 1	0 / 42

Note: The Australian Open was held twice in 1977, in January and December.

== Career finals ==
=== Singles: 13 (6 titles / 7 runner-ups) ===
Result	W-L	Date	Tournament	Surface	Opponent	Score
Loss	0–1	Feb 1968	Auckland, New Zealand	Grass	(Australia) Barry Phillips-Moore	3–6, 8–6, 6–1, 3–6, 2–6
Loss	0–2	Jan 1973	Australian Open, Australia	Grass	(Australia) John Newcombe	3–6, 7–6, 5–7, 1–6
Win	1–2	Jan 1973	Auckland, New Zealand	Grass	(France) Patrick Proisy	4–6, 6–7, 6–2, 6–0, 7–6
Loss	1–3	Sep 1973	Aptos, US	Hard	(United States) Jeff Austin	6–7, 4–6
Loss	1–4	Jan 1974	Auckland, New Zealand	Grass	(Sweden) Björn Borg	4–6, 3–6, 1–6
Loss	1–5	Jul 1974	Kitzbühel, Austria	Clay	(Hungary) Balázs Taróczy	1–6, 4–6, 4–6
Win	2–5	Nov 1974	Jakarta, Indonesia	Hard	(Australia) Kim Warwick	6–3, 6–3, 6–4
Win	3–5	Nov 1974	Bombay, India	Clay	(Australia) Tony Roche	6–3, 6–3, 7–6
Loss	3–6	Dec 1974	Adelaide, Australia	Grass	(Sweden) Björn Borg	4–6, 4–6, 6–3, 2–6
Win	4–6	Jan 1975	Auckland, New Zealand	Grass	(New Zealand) Brian Fairlie	4–6, 6–4, 6–4, 6–7, 6–4
Win	5–6	Dec 1975	Auckland, New Zealand	Grass	(New Zealand) Brian Fairlie	6–2, 6–3, 4–6, 6–3
Loss	5–7	Mar 1976	Washington, US	Carpet (i)	(United States) Harold Solomon	3–6, 1–6
Win	6–7	Apr 1976	Johannesburg, South Africa	Hard	(South Africa) Cliff Drysdale	7–6, 6–3

=== Doubles: 8 (3 titles / 5 runner-ups) ===
Result	W-L	Date	Tournament	Surface	Partner	Opponents	Score
Win	1–0	May 1971	Houston, US	Clay	(Czechoslovakia) Milan Holeček	(United States) Tom Edlefsen (United States) Frank Froehling	1–6, 7–6, 6–4
Loss	1–1	Sep 1973	Aptos, US	Hard	(South Africa) Ray Moore	(United States) Jeff Austin (United States) Fred McNair	2–6, 1–6
Loss	1–2	Mar 1974	Palm Desert, US	Hard	(South Africa) Ray Moore	(Czechoslovakia) Jan Kodeš (Czechoslovakia) Vladimír Zedník	4–6, 4–6
Win	2–2	Apr 1974	Tokyo, Japan	Hard	(South Africa) Ray Moore	(Spain) Juan Gisbert Sr. (United Kingdom) Roger Taylor	4–6, 6–2, 6–4
Win	3–2	Jun 1974	French Open	Clay	(Australia) Dick Crealy	(United States) Robert Lutz (United States) Stan Smith	6–3, 6–2, 3–6, 5–7, 6–1
Loss	3–3	Nov 1974	Bombay, India	Clay	(Australia) Dick Crealy	(India) Anand Amritraj (India) Vijay Amritraj	4–6, 6–7
Loss	3–4	Jan 1975	Auckland, New Zealand	Grass	(New Zealand) Brian Fairlie	(Australia) Bob Carmichael (Australia) Ray Ruffels	6–7, ret.
Loss	3–5	Jun 1978	Brussels, Belgium	Clay	(Czechoslovakia) Vladimír Zedník	(France) Jean-Louis Haillet (Italy) Antonio Zugarelli	3–6, 6–4, 5–7
