= Patrick Proisy =

French tennis player

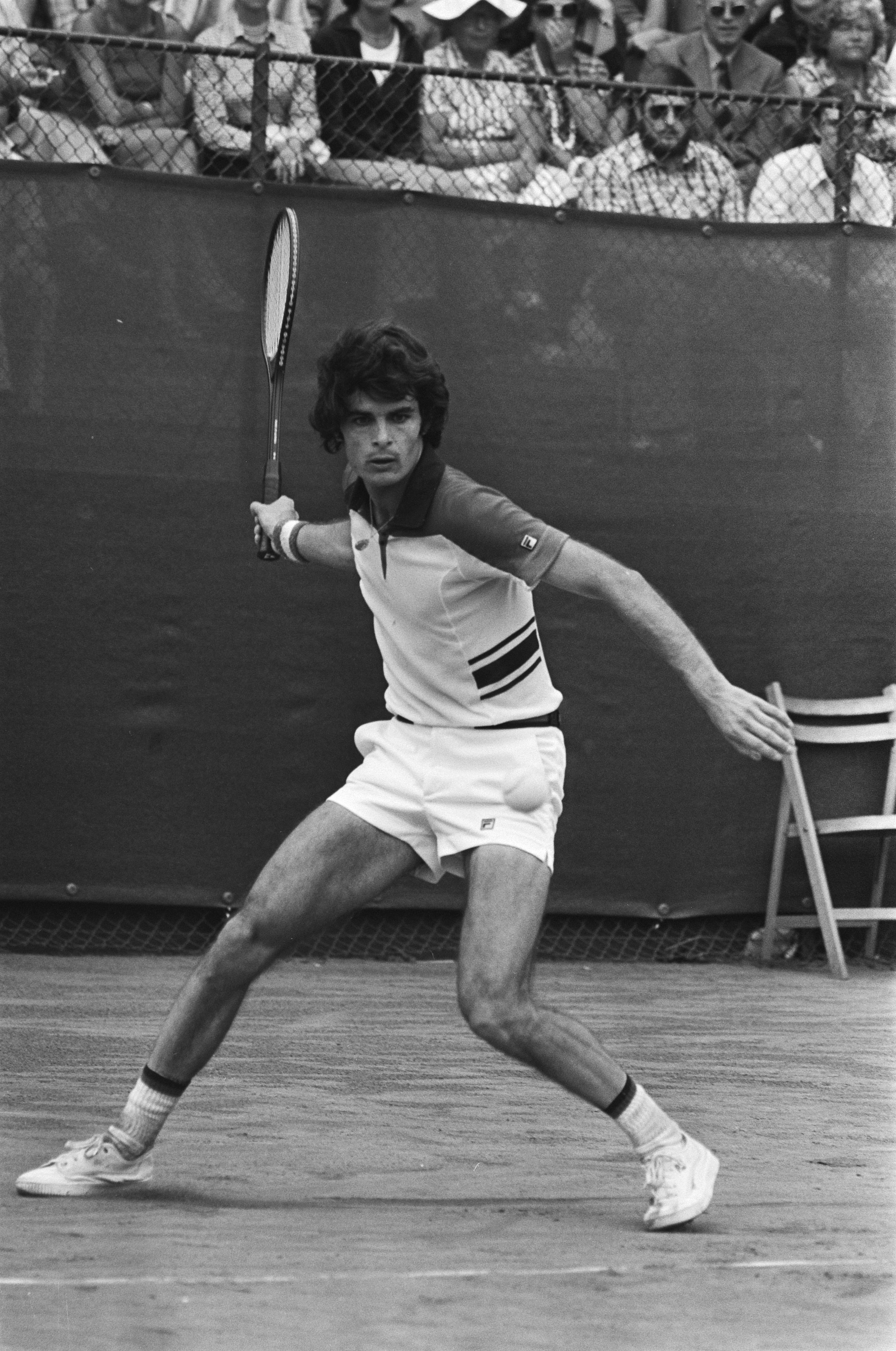
- Country (sports): France
- Residence: Paris, France
- Born: 10 September 1949 (age 77) Évreux, France
- Height: 1.80 m (5 ft 11 in)
- Turned pro: 1968
- Retired: 1981
- Plays: Right-handed (one-handed backhand)

Singles
- Career record: 200–176 (Open era)
- Career titles: 2
- Highest ranking: No. 16 (23 October 1972)

Grand Slam singles results
- Australian Open: SF (1973)
- French Open: F (1972)
- Wimbledon: 2R (1971, 1972, 1974)
- US Open: 2R (1972, 1977)

Doubles
- Career record: 72–120 (Open era)
- Career titles: 0
Medal record
Representing France
Men's Tennis
Summer Universiade
Gold medal – first place	1970 Turin	Singles

Patrick Proisy (French: [patʁik pʁwazi]; born 10 September 1949) is a French former professional tennis player best remembered for reaching the final of the French Open in 1972 (where he beat top seed and defending champion Jan Kodeš in the quarter-finals and fourth seed Manuel Orantes in the semi-finals before losing the final against sixth seeded Spaniard Andrés Gimeno in four sets). He added to that one more final (in Florence, 1976) and singles titles in Hilversum, 1977 and Perth, 1972. Proisy reached a career-high singles ranking of world No. 16 in October 1972.

== Grand Slam finals ==
=== Singles (1 runner-up) ===
Result	Year	Championship	Surface	Opponent	Score
Loss	1972	French Open	Clay	(Spain) Andrés Gimeno	6–4, 3–6, 1–6, 1–6

== Grand Slam tournament performance timeline ==
Key
W	F	SF	QF	#R	RR	Q#	DNQ	A	NH

(W) winner; (F) finalist; (SF) semifinalist; (QF) quarterfinalist; (#R) rounds 4, 3, 2, 1; (RR) round-robin stage; (Q#) qualification round; (DNQ) did not qualify; (A) absent; (NH) not held; (SR) strike rate (events won / competed); (W–L) win–loss record.

=== Singles ===
Tournament	1968	1969	1970	1971	1972	1973	1974	1975	1976	1977		1978	1979	1980	1981	SR
Australian Open	A	A	A	A	2R	SF	A	A	A	A	A	A	A	A	A	0 / 2
French Open	2R	1R	1R	QF	F	1R	3R	3R	A	2R		2R	1R	1R	2R	0 / 13
Wimbledon	Q1	Q2	1R	2R	2R	A	2R	1R	1R	A		A	A	A	A	0 / 6
US Open	A	1R	A	1R	3R	1R	A	1R	1R	2R		A	A	A	A	0 / 7
Strike rate	0 / 1	0 / 2	0 / 2	0 / 3	0 / 4	0 / 3	0 / 2	0 / 3	0 / 2	0 / 2		0 / 1	0 / 1	0 / 1	0 / 1	0 / 28

Note: The Australian Open was held twice in 1977, in January and December.

== Career finals ==
=== Singles: 5 (2 wins / 3 losses) ===
Legend (Titles)
Grand Slam (0)
Tennis Masters Cup (0)
ATP Masters Series (0)
ATP Tour (2)

Result	W–L	Date	Tournament	Surface	Opponent	Score
Loss	0–1	Jun 1972	Paris, France	Clay	(Spain) Andrés Gimeno	6–4, 3–6, 1–6, 1–6
Win	1–1	Dec 1972	Perth, Australia	Grass	(France) Wanaro N'Godrella	7–6, 6–4, 6–3
Loss	1–2	May 1975	Bournemouth, England	Clay	(Spain) Manuel Orantes	3–6, 6–4, 2–6, 5–7
Loss	1–3	May 1976	Florence, Italy	Clay	(Italy) Paolo Bertolucci	7–6, 6–2, 3–6, 2–6, 8–10
Win	2–3	Jul 1977	Hilversum, Netherlands	Clay	(Argentina) Lito Álvarez	6–2, 6–0, 6–2

== Post-playing career ==
From 1997 to 2003, Proisy was president of RC Strasbourg football club. In 2016, he received a ten-month suspended prison sentence for irregularities in transfers during his tenure; parts of transfer fees were received by the British branch of owners IMG instead of the club, who suffered on the pitch and were relegated to Ligue 2 in 2001. His sentence was reduced to six months on appeal in 2019, and part of the charges were put to a retrial in 2021. He was made to reimburse the club for €440,000.
