= Szabolcs Baranyi =

Hungarian tennis player (1944–2016)

- Country (sports): Hungary
- Born: 31 January 1944 Oradea, Romania
- Died: 3 June 2016 (aged 72)

Singles
- Career record: 42–63
- Career titles: 0
- Highest ranking: No. 94 (26 September 1973)

Grand Slam singles results
- Australian Open: 4R (1973)
- French Open: 3R (1970)
- Wimbledon: 4R (1973)

Doubles
- Career record: 27–42
- Career titles: 0

Szabolcs Baranyi (31 January 1944 – 3 June 2016) was a professional tennis player from Hungary. He enjoyed most of his tennis success while playing doubles. During his career he finished runner-up in two doubles events, on both occasions partnering compatriot Péter Szőke.

Baranyi participated in 11 Davis Cup ties for Hungary from 1969 to 1975, posting a 12–8 record in singles and a 3–3 record in doubles.

== Career finals ==
=== Doubles (2 runner-ups) ===
Result	W–L	Date	Tournament	Surface	Partner	Opponents	Score
Loss	0–1	Feb 1973	Calgary, Canada	Indoor	(Hungary) Péter Szőke	(United States) Mike Estep (Romania) Ilie Năstase	7–6, 5–7, 3–6
Loss	0–2	Feb 1979	Linz, Austria	Hard (i)	(Hungary) Péter Szőke	(France) Patrice Dominguez (France) Gilles Moretton	1–6, 4–6
