= Alex Metreveli =

Soviet tennis player

- Native name: ალექსანდრე მეტრეველი Александр Метревели
- Country (sports): Soviet Union
- Born: 2 November 1944 (age 81) Tbilisi, Georgian SSR, Soviet Union
- Turned pro: 1962
- Retired: 1979
- Plays: Right-handed (one-handed backhand)

Singles
- Career record: 474–161
- Career titles: 62
- Highest ranking: No. 9 (3 June 1974)

Grand Slam singles results
- Australian Open: SF (1972)
- French Open: SF (1972)
- Wimbledon: F (1973)
- US Open: QF (1974)

Doubles
- Career record: 81–90
- Career titles: 1

Grand Slam doubles results
- Australian Open: SF (1973)
- French Open: SF (1974)
- Wimbledon: 3R (1965, 1971, 1972, 1973)
- US Open: 3R (1974)

Grand Slam mixed doubles results
- Wimbledon: F (1968, 1970)

Alexander Irakliyevich Metreveli (Georgian: ალექსანდრე მეტრეველი, romanized: aleksandre met'reveli, pronounced [alekʰsandɾe metʼɾeveli]; Russian: Александр Ираклиевич Метревели; born 2 November 1944) is a Georgian former professional tennis player who represented the Soviet Union. He was the runner-up in men's singles at the 1973 Wimbledon Championships.

== Personal info ==
Metreveli is an honorary citizen of Australia. He was active from 1962 to 1980 and won 62 singles titles.

His grandson Aleksandre Metreveli, also a professional tennis player, has represented Georgia in the Davis Cup.

== Career ==
In 1962, aged 17, Metreveli lost 8–10, 6–3, 4–6 to Stanley Matthews in the final of the Wimbledon boys' championship.

He is best known for making the final at Wimbledon in 1973, where he lost to Jan Kodeš of Czechoslovakia. Metreveli became then the first Soviet tennis player to reach a Grand Slam singles final and, as of 2025, he remains the only player from USSR or ex Soviet countries to reach Wimbledon men's final.

Another spotlight of his career is his performance at Australian Open with three appearances where he never lost before quarter-finals and reached semi-final in 1973.

He reached a career-high singles ranking of world No. 9 in 1974 and won 9 ATP singles titles in his career. Metreveli was a member of the Dynamo sports society. He competed in professional tour events during the 1970s.

== Grand Slam finals ==
=== Singles: 1 (1 runner-up) ===
Result	Year	Championship	Surface	Opponent	Score
Loss	1973	Wimbledon	Grass	(Czechoslovakia) Jan Kodeš	1–6, 8–9^{(5–7)}, 3–6

=== Mixed doubles: 2 (2 runner-ups) ===
Result	Year	Championship	Surface	Partner	Opponents	Score
Loss	1968	Wimbledon	Grass	(Soviet Union) Olga Morozova	(Australia) Margaret Court (Australia) Ken Fletcher	1–6, 12–14
Loss	1970	Wimbledon	Grass	(Soviet Union) Olga Morozova	(United States) Rosemary Casals (Romania) Ilie Năstase	3–6, 6–4, 7–9

== Grand Slam singles performance timeline ==
Key
W	F	SF	QF	#R	RR	Q#	DNQ	A	NH

(W) winner; (F) finalist; (SF) semifinalist; (QF) quarterfinalist; (#R) rounds 4, 3, 2, 1; (RR) round-robin stage; (Q#) qualification round; (DNQ) did not qualify; (A) absent; (NH) not held; (SR) strike rate (events won / competed); (W–L) win–loss record.

Tournament	1962	1963	1964	1965	1966	1967	1968	1969	1970	1971	1972	1973	1974	1975	1976
Australian Open	A	A	A	A	A	A	A	A	A	A	SF	QF	A	QF	A
French Open	A	A	A	2R	QF	3R	1R	1R	4R	2R	SF	2R	2R	2R	A
Wimbledon	A	1R	3R	3R	2R	1R	4R	2R	2R	4R	QF	F	QF	4R	3R
US Open	3R	A	A	A	A	A	A	A	3R	A	A	A	QF	1R	2R
