= 1973 Australian Open =

- Date: 26 December 1972 – 1 January 1973
- Edition: 61st
- Category: Grand Slam (ITF)
- Surface: Grass
- Location: Melbourne, Australia
- Venue: Kooyong Lawn Tennis Club

Champions

Men's singles
- (Australia) John Newcombe

Women's singles
- (Australia) Margaret Court

Men's doubles
- (Australia) Malcolm Anderson / (Australia) John Newcombe

Women's doubles
- (Australia) Margaret Court / (United Kingdom) Virginia Wade
- Australian Open

The 1973 Australian Open was a tennis tournament played on outdoor grass courts at the Kooyong Lawn Tennis Club in Melbourne in Australia and was held from 26 December 1972 to 1 January 1973. It was the 61st edition of the Australian Open and the first Grand Slam tournament of the year.

== Seniors ==
=== Men's singles ===
(Australia) John Newcombe defeated (New Zealand) Onny Parun, 6–3, 6–7, 7–5, 6–1

- It was Newcombe's 5th career Grand Slam title, and his 1st Australian Open title.

=== Women's singles ===
(Australia) Margaret Court defeated (Australia) Evonne Goolagong, 6–4, 7–5

=== Men's doubles ===
(Australia) John Newcombe / (Australia) Malcolm Anderson defeated (Australia) John Alexander / (Australia) Phil Dent, 6–3, 6–4, 7–6

=== Women's doubles ===
(Australia) Margaret Court / (United Kingdom) Virginia Wade defeated (Australia) Kerry Harris / (Australia) Kerry Melville, 6–4, 6–4

=== Mixed doubles ===
Competition not held between 1970 and 1986.

Preceded by 1972 US Open	Grand Slams	Succeeded by 1973 French Open
