= John Cooper (tennis) =

Australian former tennis player (born 1946)

- Full name: John Richard Cooper
- Country (sports): Australia
- Born: 4 November 1946 (age 79) Alexandra, Victoria, Australia
- Turned pro: 1968 (amateur from 1964)
- Retired: 1975
- Plays: Right-handed (one-handed backhand)

Singles
- Career record: 64–71 (Open era)
- Career titles: 1
- Highest ranking: No. 30 (22 April 1968)

Grand Slam singles results
- Australian Open: QF (1972, 1973)
- French Open: 2R (1971)
- Wimbledon: QF (1967)
- US Open: 4R (1972)

Doubles
- Career record: 36–47

Grand Slam doubles results
- Australian Open: QF (1971, 1972, 1973)
- French Open: 2R (1971)
- Wimbledon: F (1973)
- US Open: 2R (1972)

Team competitions
- Davis Cup: W (1973)

John Richard Cooper (born 4 November 1946) is a former Australian male tennis player who played on the Grand Prix circuit in the 1970s. He reached the quarterfinals of Wimbledon in 1967 and the Australian Open in 1972 and 1973. Other career highlights include finishing runner-up in 1973 Wimbledon Championships doubles tournament and a singles victory at Hilversum in 1972. Cooper was also on the winning Davis Cup team in 1973.

He is the younger brother of four-time Grand Slam tournament winner Ashley Cooper.

== Grand slam finals ==
=== Doubles (1 runner-up) ===
Result	Year	Championship	Surface	Partner	Opponents	Score
Loss	1973	Wimbledon	Grass	(Australia) Neale Fraser	(United States) Jimmy Connors (Romania) Ilie Năstase	6–3, 3–6, 4–6, 9–8, 1–6

== See also ==
- List of male tennis players
