= Patrice Dominguez =

French former tennis player (1950–2015)

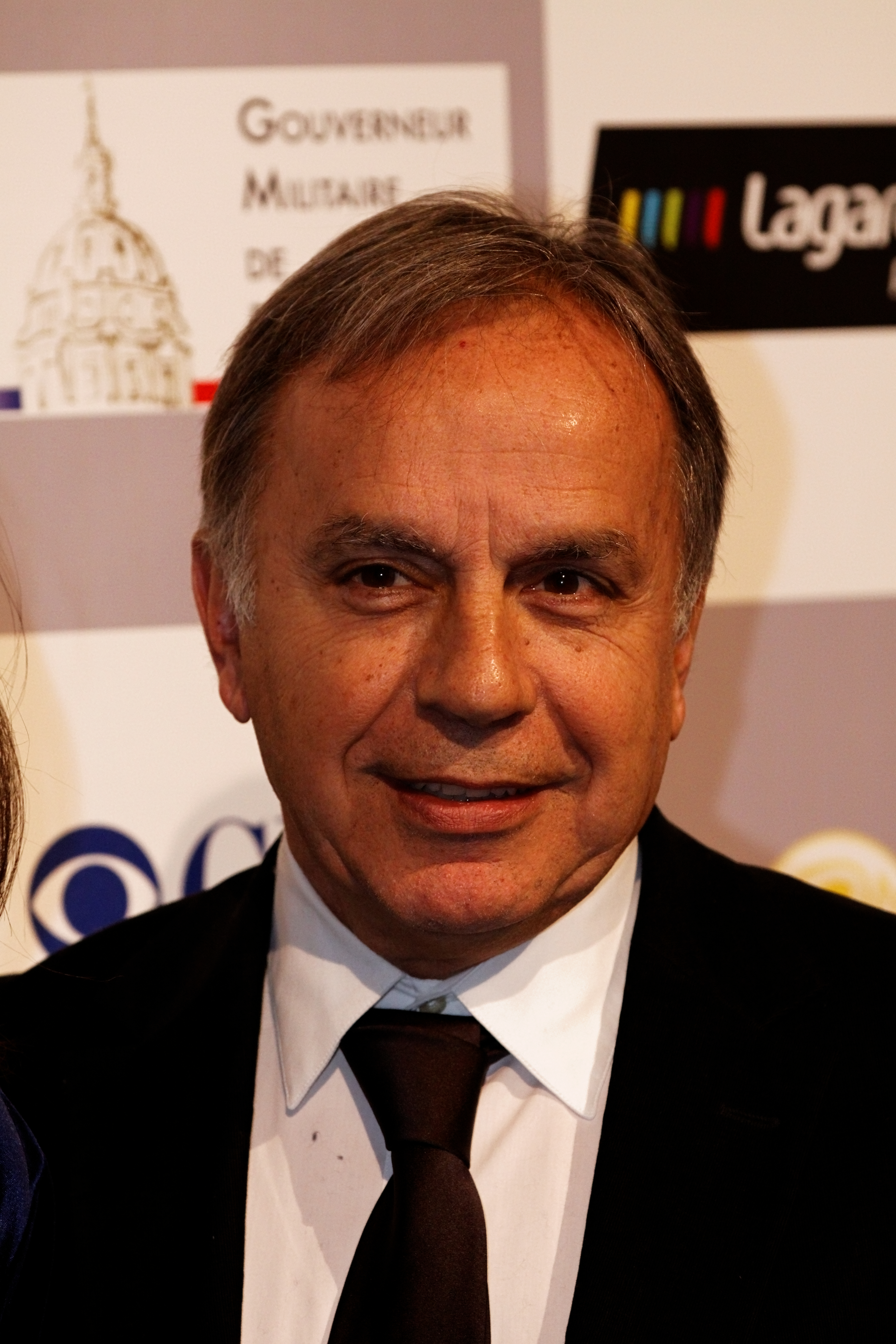
- Country (sports): France
- Born: 12 January 1950 Algiers, French Algeria
- Died: 12 April 2015 (aged 65) Paris, France
- Height: 1.74 m (5 ft 8 1/2 in)
- Plays: Left-handed

Singles
- Career record: 150–154
- Career titles: 0
- Highest ranking: No. 36 (23 August 1973)

Grand Slam singles results
- Australian Open: 4R (1973)
- French Open: 4R (1971)
- Wimbledon: 4R (1974)
- US Open: 2R (1973)

Doubles
- Career record: 107–116
- Career titles: 6

Grand Slam mixed doubles results
- French Open: F (1973, 1978)

Patrice Dominguez (12 January 1950 – 12 April 2015) was a French tennis player born in Algeria. He reached a career high ranking of No. 36 in 1973. He represented France in the Davis Cup from 1971 to 1979.

Dominguez was a finalist at the 1973 French Open mixed doubles event partnering Betty Stöve and again in 1978 partnering Virginia Ruzici.

He then became a trainer for several players such as Henri Leconte and Fabrice Santoro. He also worked as an analyst for different French media.

From 2005 to 2011, he was the national technical director of the French Tennis Federation.

Dominguez died on 12 April 2015 from a chronic illness at the age of 65.

== Grand Slam finals ==
=== Mixed doubles (2 runners-up) ===
Result	Year	Championship	Surface	Partner	Opponents	Score
Loss	1973	French Open	Clay	(Netherlands) Betty Stöve	(France) Françoise Dürr (France) Jean-Claude Barclay	1–6, 4–6
Loss	1978	French Open	Clay	(Romania) Virginia Ruzici	(Czechoslovakia) Renáta Tomanová (Czechoslovakia) Pavel Složil	6–7, ret.

== Career finals ==
=== Singles (5 runner-ups) ===
Result	W-L	Date	Tournament	Surface	Opponent	Score
Loss	0–1	Jan 1972	Sydney, Australia	Grass	(Soviet Union) Alex Metreveli	4–6, 4–6, 6–3, 1–6
Loss	0–2	Jun 1972	Manchester, UK	Grass	(Brazil) Thomaz Koch	2–6, 7–5, 4–6
Loss	0–3	Jun 1973	Eastbourne, UK	Grass	(United Kingdom) Mark Cox	2–6, 6–2, 3–6
Loss	0–4	May 1978	Florence, Italy	Clay	(Argentina) José Luis Clerc	6–4, 6–2, 6–1
Loss	0–5	Jun 1979	Berlin, Germany	Clay	(Australia) Peter McNamara	4–6, 0–6, 7–6, 2–6

Source: ATP

=== Doubles: 9 (6 titles / 3 runner-ups) ===
Result	W-L	Date	Tournament	Surface	Partner	Opponents	Score
Win	1–0	Oct 1974	Madrid, Spain	Clay	(Spain) Antonio Muñoz	(United States) Brian Gottfried (Mexico) Raúl Ramírez	6–1, 6–3
Win	2–0	Nov 1974	Paris Indoor, France	Hard (i)	(France) François Jauffret	(United States) Brian Gottfried (Mexico) Raúl Ramírez	7–5, 6–4
Loss	2–1	Apr 1975	Stockholm, Sweden	Carpet (i)	(Australia) Kim Warwick	(United States) Arthur Ashe (Netherlands) Tom Okker	3–6, 6–7
Loss	2–2	Jul 1975	Kitzbühel, Austria	Clay	(France) François Jauffret	(Italy) Paolo Bertolucci (Italy) Adriano Panatta	2–6, 2–6, 6–7
Win	3–2	Apr 1976	Nice, France	Clay	(France) François Jauffret	(Poland) Wojciech Fibak (West Germany) Karl Meiler	6–4, 3–6, 6–3
Win	4–2	Apr 1977	Murcia, Spain	Clay	(France) François Jauffret	(Chile) Patricio Cornejo (Chile) Hans Gildemeister	7–5, 6–2
Loss	4–3	Oct 1977	Aix-en-Provence, France	Clay	(Sweden) Rolf Norberg	(Romania) Ilie Năstase (Romania) Ion Țiriac	6–1, 5–7, 3–6, 3–6
Win	5–3	Apr 1978	Nice, France	Clay	(France) François Jauffret	(Czechoslovakia) Jan Kodeš (Czechoslovakia) Tomáš Šmíd	6–4, 6–0
Win	6–3	Oct 1979	Bordeaux, France	Clay	(France) Denis Naegelen	(France) Bernard Fritz (Colombia) Iván Molina	6–4, 6–4

Source: ATP
