= Wanaro N'Godrella =

French tennis player

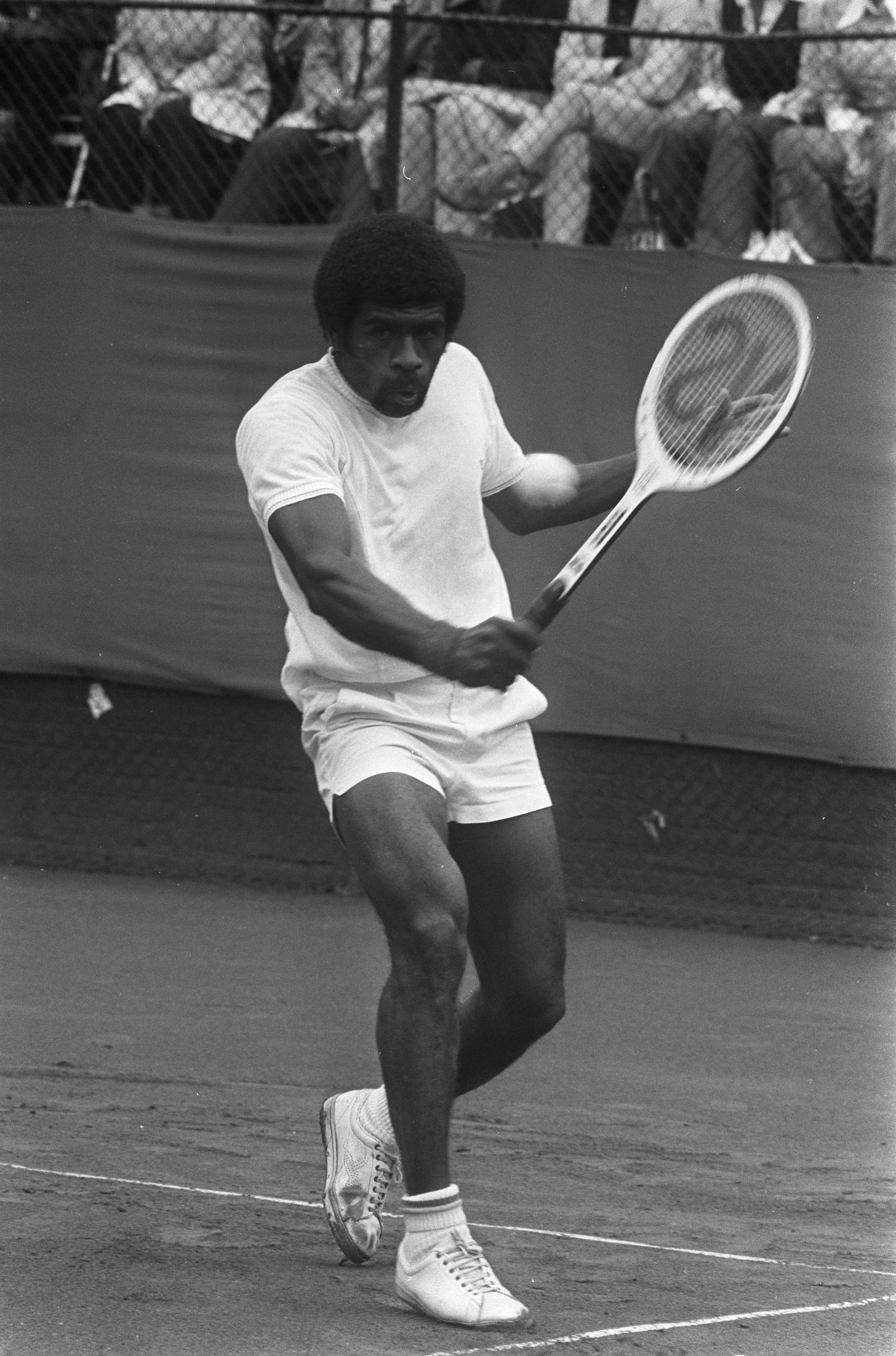
- Country (sports): France
- Born: 18 October 1949; Nouméa, New Caledonia
- Died: 26 May 2016 (aged 66); Nouméa, New Caledonia

Singles
- Highest ranking: No. 71 (15 October 1973)

Grand Slam singles results
- Australian Open: QF (1973)
- French Open: 3R (1973)
- Wimbledon: 2R (1972)
- US Open: 3R (1972)

Doubles

Grand Slam doubles results
- Australian Open: 2R (1972, 1974)
- French Open: 3R (1974)
- Wimbledon: 2R (1969)

Grand Slam mixed doubles results
- French Open: SF (1974)

Wanaro N'Godrella (18 October 1949 – 26 May 2016) was a French tennis player who was active in the late 1960s and the 1970s. His best performance at a Grand Slam tournament was reaching the quarterfinals of the singles' event at the 1973 Australian Open in which he was defeated by Karl Meiler in four sets. In 1973 and 1974 he played a doubles match for the French Davis Cup team.

He reached the highest singles ranking of No. 71 in October 1973.

N'Godrella reached the second round of the singles' event at the Wimbledon Championships in 1972. In 1973 he defeated fifth-seeded Manuel Orantes in the second round of the singles event at the French Open.

The center court at the ATP Challenger Tour event in his hometown of Nouméa is named for N'Godrella.

== Career finals ==
=== Doubles (1 runner-up) ===
Result	W-L	Date	Tournament	Surface	Partner	Opponents	Score
Loss	0–1	Sep 1972	Seattle, U.S.	Hard	(France) Jean-Baptiste Chanfreau	(Australia) Ross Case (Australia) Geoff Masters	6–4, 6–7, 4–6
