= 1972 Grand Prix (tennis) =

Tennis circuit

1972 Grand Prix circuit
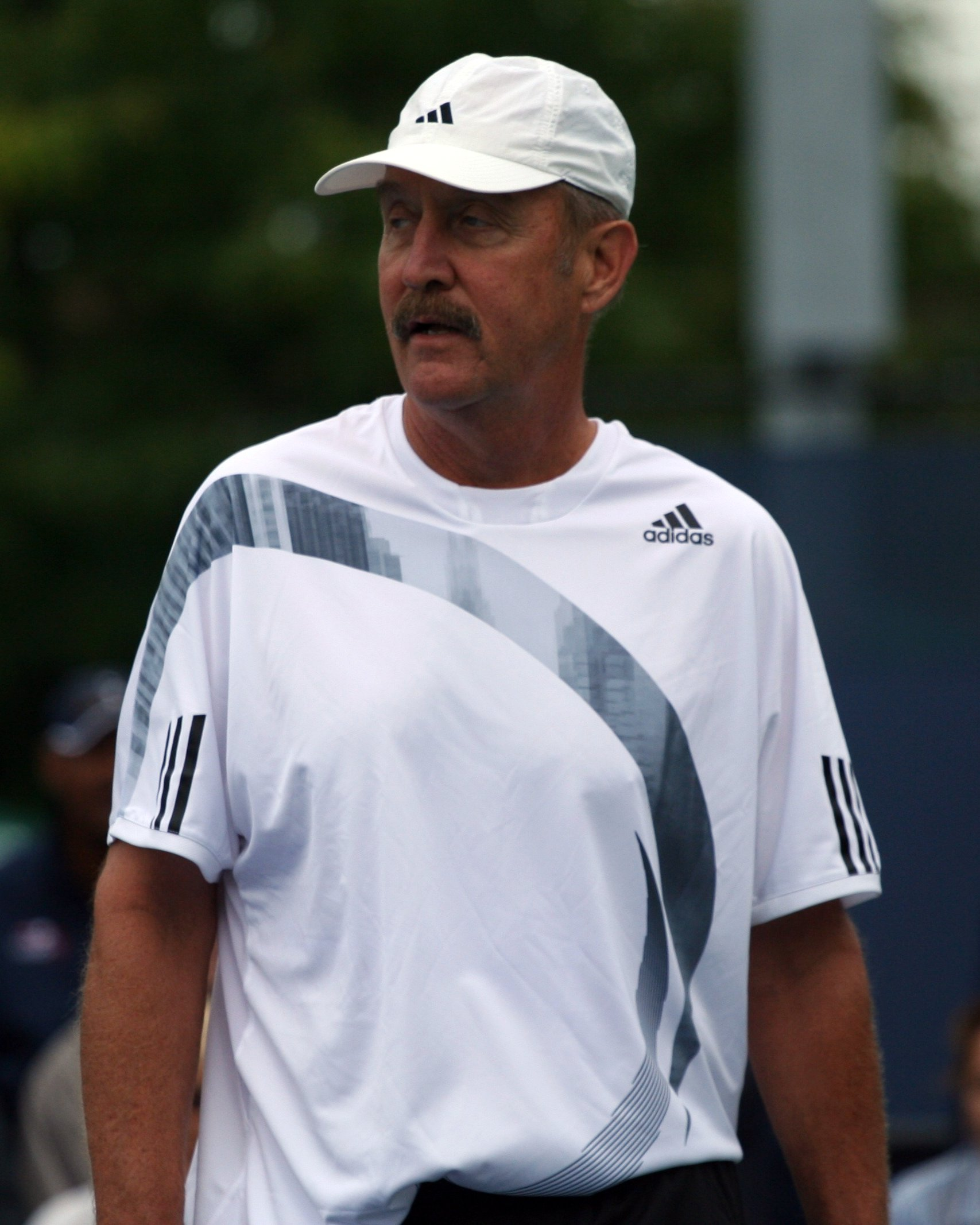
- Stan Smith at 2009 US Open

Details
- Duration: 14 February 1972 – 28 November 1972
- Edition: 3rd
- Tournaments: 33
- Categories: Group AA (3); Masters (1); Group A (7); Group B (4); Group C (14); Group D (5)

Achievements (singles)
- Most titles: (United States) Stan Smith (9)
- Most finals: (Romania) Ilie Năstase (11)
- Prize money leader: (Romania) Ilie Năstase (£21,000)
- Points leader: (Romania) Ilie Năstase (659)

The 1972 Commercial Union Assurance Grand Prix was a professional tennis circuit held that year and organized by the International Lawn Tennis Federation (ILTF). It consisted of 33 Grand Prix tournaments in different categories including three of the four Grand Slam tournaments and was followed by a season-ending Masters tournament. The circuit ran from February through November.

The 1972 Grand Prix circuit ran in competition with the 1972 World Championship Tennis circuit and, to a lesser extent, with the smaller 1972 USLTA Indoor Circuit. Five American indoor tournament in February and March were als part of the USLTA Indoor Circuit. In July 1971 at its annual meeting, the ILTF voted to ban all WCT contract professionals from their tournaments and facilities from the beginning of 1972 onwards. This meant that leading WCT players such as Rod Laver, Ken Rosewall, Arthur Ashe and John Newcombe did not initially have permission to compete in the Grand Prix circuit and Newcombe could not defend his two consecutive Wimbledon titles of 1970 and 1971. In April 1972, however, an agreement was reached between the ILTF and WCT that divided the 1973 tour in a WCT circuit that ran from January through April and a Grand Prix circuit that was scheduled for the rest of the year. Under the agreement the players contracted by the WCT could play in the Grand Prix events as of September 1972. The deal was ratified at the annual ILTF meeting in July.

== Schedule ==
Key

Group AA tournaments
Grand Prix Masters
Group A tournaments
Group B tournaments
Group C tournaments
Team events

=== February ===
Week	Tournament	Champions	Runners-up	Semifinalists	Quarterfinalists
14 Feb	The May Co. International (Note: Also part of the 1972 USLTA Indoor Circuit); Los Angeles, California, US; Group C 32S/16D	(Spain) Andrés Gimeno; 6–3, 2–6, 6–2	(France) Pierre Barthès	(United States) Jimmy Connors (Brazil) Thomaz Koch	(Czechoslovakia) Vladimír Zedník (United States) Cliff Richey (United States) Pancho Gonzales (Romania) Ilie Năstase
14 Feb	The May Co. International; Los Angeles, California, US; Group C 32S/16D	(United States) Jim Osborne (United States) Jim McManus; 6–2, 5–7, 6–4	(Romania) Ilie Năstase (Romania) Ion Țiriac	(United States) Jimmy Connors (Brazil) Thomaz Koch	(Czechoslovakia) Vladimír Zedník (United States) Cliff Richey (United States) Pancho Gonzales (Romania) Ilie Năstase
20 Feb	U.S. National Indoor Championships; Salisbury, Maryland, US; Group B Hard – $50,000 – 64S/32D	(United States) Stan Smith; 5–7, 6–2, 6–3, 6–4	(Romania) Ilie Năstase	(Pakistan) Haroon Rahim (United Kingdom) Gerald Battrick	(Chile) Jaime Fillol (United States) Clark Graebner (Spain) Manuel Orantes (United States) Tom Gorman
20 Feb	U.S. National Indoor Championships; Salisbury, Maryland, US; Group B Hard – $50,000 – 64S/32D	(Spain) Manuel Orantes (Spain) Andrés Gimeno; 6–4, 6–3	(Spain) Juan Gisbert (Czechoslovakia) Vladimír Zedník	(Pakistan) Haroon Rahim (United Kingdom) Gerald Battrick	(Chile) Jaime Fillol (United States) Clark Graebner (Spain) Manuel Orantes (United States) Tom Gorman
28 Feb	Clean Air Classic; New York, US; Group C 64S	(United States) Stan Smith; 4–6, 7–5, 6–4, 6–1	(Spain) Juan Gisbert	(United States) Cliff Richey (Romania) Ilie Năstase	(United States) Alejandro Olmedo (Sweden) Ove Nils Bengtson (Spain) Andrés Gimeno (United States) Jimmy Connors

=== March ===
Week	Tournament	Champions	Runners-up	Semifinalists	Quarterfinalists
5 Mar	National Indoor Championships; Hampton, Virginia, US; Group C Hard (i) – 32S/16D; Singles – Doubles	(United States) Stan Smith; 6–3, 6–2, 6–7, 6–4	(Romania) Ilie Năstase	(Spain) Andrés Gimeno (United States) Cliff Richey	(Spain) Juan Gisbert (United States) Jimmy Connors (France) Georges Goven (New Zealand) Ian Crookenden
5 Mar	National Indoor Championships; Hampton, Virginia, US; Group C Hard (i) – 32S/16D; Singles – Doubles	(Romania) Ion Țiriac (Romania) Ilie Năstase; 7–5, 7–5	(Spain) Andrés Gimeno (Spain) Manuel Orantes	(Spain) Andrés Gimeno (United States) Cliff Richey	(Spain) Juan Gisbert (United States) Jimmy Connors (France) Georges Goven (New Zealand) Ian Crookenden
12 Mar	Equity Funding International; Washington, D.C., US; Group C Carpet (i) – $25,000 – 32S/16D	(United States) Stan Smith; 6–3, 6–2, 6–7, 6–4	(United States) Jimmy Connors	(United States) Tom Gorman (Spain) Manuel Orantes	(United States) Jim Osborne (United States) Cliff Richey (Romania) Ilie Năstase (France) Pierre Barthès
12 Mar	Equity Funding International; Washington, D.C., US; Group C Carpet (i) – $25,000 – 32S/16D	(United States) Cliff Richey (United States) Tom Edlefsen; 6–4, 6–3	(United States) Clark Graebner (Brazil) Thomaz Koch	(United States) Tom Gorman (Spain) Manuel Orantes	(United States) Jim Osborne (United States) Cliff Richey (Romania) Ilie Năstase (France) Pierre Barthès
27 Mar	Monte Carlo Open Championships; Roquebrune-Cap-Martin, France; Group C Clay – $20,000 – 32S/32D	(Romania) Ilie Năstase; 6–1, 6–0, 6–3	(Czechoslovakia) František Pála	(Socialist Federal Republic of Yugoslavia) Boro Jovanović (Czechoslovakia) Jiří Hřebec	(Belgium) Bernard Mignot (Romania) Ion Țiriac (Hungary) Szabolcs Baranyi (Hungary) Péter Szőke
27 Mar	Monte Carlo Open Championships; Roquebrune-Cap-Martin, France; Group C Clay – $20,000 – 32S/32D	(France) Patrice Beust (France) Daniel Contet; 3–6, 6–1, 12–10, 6–2	(Czechoslovakia) Jiří Hřebec (Czechoslovakia) František Pála	(Socialist Federal Republic of Yugoslavia) Boro Jovanović (Czechoslovakia) Jiří Hřebec	(Belgium) Bernard Mignot (Romania) Ion Țiriac (Hungary) Szabolcs Baranyi (Hungary) Péter Szőke

=== April ===
Week	Tournament	Champions	Runners-up	Semifinalists	Quarterfinalists
8 Apr	South African Open ^{*} Johannesburg, South Africa; Group A Hard – 32S/16D	(United States) Cliff Richey; 6–4, 7–5, 3–6, 6–4	(Spain) Manuel Orantes	(Spain) Andrés Gimeno (Chile) Jaime Fillol	(Australia) Martin Mulligan (South Africa) Bob Hewitt (Rhodesia) Andrew Pattison (South Africa) Pat Cramer
8 Apr	South African Open ^{*} Johannesburg, South Africa; Group A Hard – 32S/16D	(South Africa) Bob Hewitt (South Africa) Frew McMillan; 6–2, 6–2, 6–4	(France) Georges Goven (South Africa) Ray Moore	(Spain) Andrés Gimeno (Chile) Jaime Fillol	(Australia) Martin Mulligan (South Africa) Bob Hewitt (Rhodesia) Andrew Pattison (South Africa) Pat Cramer
16 Apr	Melia Trophy International; Madrid, Spain; Group B Clay – 32S/32D	(Romania) Ilie Năstase; 6–0, 6–0, 6–1	(Czechoslovakia) František Pála	(Czechoslovakia) Jan Kodeš (France) Patrick Proisy	(Hungary) Szabolcs Baranyi (Spain) Andrés Gimeno (Spain) Manuel Orantes (Italy) Adriano Panatta
16 Apr	Melia Trophy International; Madrid, Spain; Group B Clay – 32S/32D	(United States) Stan Smith (Romania) Ilie Năstase; 6–3, 6–4, 6–4	(Spain) Andrés Gimeno (Spain) Manuel Orantes	(Czechoslovakia) Jan Kodeš (France) Patrick Proisy	(Hungary) Szabolcs Baranyi (Spain) Andrés Gimeno (Spain) Manuel Orantes (Italy) Adriano Panatta
23 Apr	Nice International Championships; Nice, France; Group D Clay – $30,000 – 48S/8D	(Romania) Ilie Năstase; 6–0, 6–4, 6–3	(Czechoslovakia) Jan Kodeš	(United States) Stan Smith (Socialist Federal Republic of Yugoslavia) Boro Jovanović	(Australia) Barry Phillips-Moore (Australia) Dick Crealy (France) Pierre Barthès (United Kingdom) Gerald Battrick
23 Apr	Nice International Championships; Nice, France; Group D Clay – $30,000 – 48S/8D	(United States) Stan Smith (Czechoslovakia) Jan Kodeš; 6–3, 3–6, 7–5	(South Africa) Frew McMillan (Romania) Ilie Năstase	(United States) Stan Smith (Socialist Federal Republic of Yugoslavia) Boro Jovanović	(Australia) Barry Phillips-Moore (Australia) Dick Crealy (France) Pierre Barthès (United Kingdom) Gerald Battrick
24 Apr	Italian Open; Rome, Italy ^{*} Group A Clay – $56,000 – 64S/32D	(Spain) Manuel Orantes; 4–6, 6–1, 7–5, 6–2	(Czechoslovakia) Jan Kodeš	(Romania) Ilie Năstase (Australia) Barry Phillips-Moore	(Rhodesia) Andrew Pattison (Italy) Paolo Bertolucci (Soviet Union) Alex Metreveli (France) Jean-Loup Rouyer
24 Apr	Italian Open; Rome, Italy ^{*} Group A Clay – $56,000 – 64S/32D	(Romania) Ion Țiriac (Romania) Ilie Năstase; 3–6, 3–6, 6–4, 6–3, 5–3 ret.	(South Africa) Frew McMillan (Australia) Lew Hoad	(Romania) Ilie Năstase (Australia) Barry Phillips-Moore	(Rhodesia) Andrew Pattison (Italy) Paolo Bertolucci (Soviet Union) Alex Metreveli (France) Jean-Loup Rouyer

=== May ===
Week	Tournament	Champions	Runners-up	Semifinalists	Quarterfinalists
13 May	British Hard Court Championships; Bournemouth, England ^{*} Group C Clay – 32S/16D	(South Africa) Bob Hewitt; 6–2, 6–4, 6–3	(France) Pierre Barthès	(Romania) Ilie Năstase (United States) Stan Smith	(Romania) Ion Țiriac (United States) Jimmy Connors (South Africa) Pat Cramer (West Germany) Jürgen Fassbender
13 May	British Hard Court Championships; Bournemouth, England ^{*} Group C Clay – 32S/16D	(South Africa) Frew McMillan (South Africa) Bob Hewitt; 7–5, 6–2	(Romania) Ilie Năstase (Romania) Ion Țiriac	(Romania) Ilie Năstase (United States) Stan Smith	(Romania) Ion Țiriac (United States) Jimmy Connors (South Africa) Pat Cramer (West Germany) Jürgen Fassbender
14 May	Belgian Open Championships; Brussels, Belgium; Group C Clay – $25,000 – 32S/16D	(Spain) Manuel Orantes; 6–4, 6–1, 2–6, 7–5	(Spain) Andrés Gimeno	(United States) Harold Solomon (Australia) Barry Phillips-Moore	(Belgium) Patrick Hombergen (Spain) Juan Gisbert (West Germany) Harald Elschenbroich (Czechoslovakia) Vladimír Zedník
14 May	Belgian Open Championships; Brussels, Belgium; Group C Clay – $25,000 – 32S/16D	(Spain) Manuel Orantes (Spain) Juan Gisbert; 9–7, 6–3	(Chile) Patricio Cornejo (Chile) Jaime Fillol	(United States) Harold Solomon (Australia) Barry Phillips-Moore	(Belgium) Patrick Hombergen (Spain) Juan Gisbert (West Germany) Harald Elschenbroich (Czechoslovakia) Vladimír Zedník
22 May	French Open ^{*} Paris, France; Grand Slam; Group AA; Clay	(Spain) Andrés Gimeno; 4–6, 6–3, 6–1, 6–1	(France) Patrick Proisy	(Soviet Union) Alex Metreveli (Spain) Manuel Orantes	(Italy) Adriano Panatta (United States) Stan Smith (United States) Harold Solomon (Czechoslovakia) Jan Kodeš
22 May	French Open ^{*} Paris, France; Grand Slam; Group AA; Clay	(South Africa) Frew McMillan (South Africa) Bob Hewitt; 6–3, 8–6, 3–6, 6–1	(Chile) Patricio Cornejo (Chile) Jaime Fillol	(Soviet Union) Alex Metreveli (Spain) Manuel Orantes	(Italy) Adriano Panatta (United States) Stan Smith (United States) Harold Solomon (Czechoslovakia) Jan Kodeš
22 May	French Open ^{*} Paris, France; Grand Slam; Group AA; Clay	(Australia) Evonne Goolagong (Australia) Kim Warwick; 6–2, 6–4	(France) Françoise Dürr (France) Jean-Claude Barclay	(Soviet Union) Alex Metreveli (Spain) Manuel Orantes	(Italy) Adriano Panatta (United States) Stan Smith (United States) Harold Solomon (Czechoslovakia) Jan Kodeš

=== June ===
Week	Tournament	Champions	Runners-up	Semifinalists	Quarterfinalists
5 Jun	German Open Championships; Hamburg, West Germany ^{*} Group B Clay – 32S/32D	(Spain) Manuel Orantes; 6–3, 9–8, 6–0	(Italy) Adriano Panatta	(Czechoslovakia) Jan Kodeš (South Africa) Bob Hewitt	(Romania) Ion Țiriac (United States) Jimmy Connors (South Africa) Pat Cramer (West Germany) Jürgen Fassbender
5 Jun	German Open Championships; Hamburg, West Germany ^{*} Group B Clay – 32S/32D	(Romania) Ilie Năstase (Czechoslovakia) Jan Kodeš; 4–6, 6–0, 3–6, 6–2, 6–2	(South Africa) Bob Hewitt (Romania) Ion Țiriac	(Czechoslovakia) Jan Kodeš (South Africa) Bob Hewitt	(Romania) Ion Țiriac (United States) Jimmy Connors (South Africa) Pat Cramer (West Germany) Jürgen Fassbender
17 Jun	Bristol Open; Bristol, England ^{*} Group C Grass – 32S/32D	(South Africa) Bob Hewitt; 6–4, 6–3	(United States) Alejandro Olmedo	(France) François Jauffret (United States) Clark Graebner	(United Kingdom) John De Mendoza (Australia) Colin Dibley (United Kingdom) John Paish (Rhodesia) Andrew Pattison
17 Jun	Bristol Open; Bristol, England ^{*} Group C Grass – 32S/32D	(South Africa) Frew McMillan (South Africa) Bob Hewitt; 6–3, 6–2	(United States) Clark Graebner (Australia) Lew Hoad	(France) François Jauffret (United States) Clark Graebner	(United Kingdom) John De Mendoza (Australia) Colin Dibley (United Kingdom) John Paish (Rhodesia) Andrew Pattison
26 Jun	Wimbledon ^{*} London, England; Grand Slam; Group AA; Grass	(United States) Stan Smith; 4–6, 6–3, 6–3, 4–6, 7–5	(Romania) Ilie Năstase	(Czechoslovakia) Jan Kodeš (Spain) Manuel Orantes	(Soviet Union) Alex Metreveli (New Zealand) Onny Parun (Australia) Colin Dibley (United States) Jimmy Connors
26 Jun	Wimbledon ^{*} London, England; Grand Slam; Group AA; Grass	(South Africa) Bob Hewitt (South Africa) Frew McMillan; 6–2, 6–2, 9–7	(United States) Stan Smith (United States) Erik van Dillen	(Czechoslovakia) Jan Kodeš (Spain) Manuel Orantes	(Soviet Union) Alex Metreveli (New Zealand) Onny Parun (Australia) Colin Dibley (United States) Jimmy Connors
26 Jun	Wimbledon ^{*} London, England; Grand Slam; Group AA; Grass	(United States) Rosemary Casals (Romania) Ilie Năstase; 6–4, 6–4	(Australia) Evonne Goolagong (Australia) Kim Warwick	(Czechoslovakia) Jan Kodeš (Spain) Manuel Orantes	(Soviet Union) Alex Metreveli (New Zealand) Onny Parun (Australia) Colin Dibley (United States) Jimmy Connors

=== July ===
Week	Tournament	Champions	Runners-up	Semifinalists	Quarterfinalists
16 Jul	Swedish Open; Båstad, Sweden; Group C Clay – 32S/16D	(Spain) Manuel Orantes; 6–4, 6–3, 6–1	(Romania) Ilie Năstase	(Spain) Juan Gisbert (Hungary) Balázs Taróczy	(Sweden) Björn Borg (Australia) Colin Dibley (Hungary) Szabolcs Baranyi (Brazil) Jose Mandarino
16 Jul	Swedish Open; Båstad, Sweden; Group C Clay – 32S/16D	(Spain) Manuel Orantes (Spain) Juan Gisbert; 6–3, 7–6	(Australia) Neale Fraser (Romania) Ilie Năstase	(Spain) Juan Gisbert (Hungary) Balázs Taróczy	(Sweden) Björn Borg (Australia) Colin Dibley (Hungary) Szabolcs Baranyi (Brazil) Jose Mandarino
16 Jul	Swiss Open Championships; Gstaad, Switzerland; Group C Clay – $25,000 – 32S/16D	(Spain) Andrés Gimeno; 7–5, 9–8, 6–4	(Italy) Adriano Panatta	(Romania) Ion Țiriac (Australia) Barry Phillips-Moore	(United States) Roscoe Tanner (France) Jean-Loup Rouyer (Belgium) Patrick Hombergen (United States) Sandy Mayer
16 Jul	Swiss Open Championships; Gstaad, Switzerland; Group C Clay – $25,000 – 32S/16D	(Spain) Andrés Gimeno (Spain) Antonio Muñoz; 9–8, 4–6, 6–1, 7–5	(Italy) Adriano Panatta (Romania) Ion Țiriac	(Romania) Ion Țiriac (Australia) Barry Phillips-Moore	(United States) Roscoe Tanner (France) Jean-Loup Rouyer (Belgium) Patrick Hombergen (United States) Sandy Mayer
22 Jul	Austrian Open; Kitzbühel, Austria; Group D Clay – 32S/32D	(Australia) Colin Dibley; 6–1, 6–3, 6–4	(Australia) Dick Crealy	(Brazil) Jose Mandarino (New Zealand) Onny Parun	(Australia) Harald Elschenbroich (Greece) Nicholas Kalogeropoulos (Australia) Barry Phillips-Moore (France) François Jauffret
22 Jul	Austrian Open; Kitzbühel, Austria; Group D Clay – 32S/32D	(West Germany) Hans-Jürgen Pohmann (West Germany) Jürgen Fassbender; 7–6, 6–4, 6–4	(Australia) Mal Anderson (Australia) Geoff Masters	(Brazil) Jose Mandarino (New Zealand) Onny Parun	(Australia) Harald Elschenbroich (Greece) Nicholas Kalogeropoulos (Australia) Barry Phillips-Moore (France) François Jauffret
23 Jul	Buckeye Classic; Columbus, Ohio, US; Group D Hard – $25,000 – 32S/16D; Singles – Doubles	(United States) Jimmy Connors; 7–5, 6–3, 7–5	(Rhodesia) Andrew Pattison	(United States) Dick Stockton (South Africa) Bob Hewitt	(United States) Charles Owens (United States) Steve Faulk (United States) Pancho Gonzales (United States) Jim McManus
23 Jul	Buckeye Classic; Columbus, Ohio, US; Group D Hard – $25,000 – 32S/16D; Singles – Doubles	(United States) Pancho Gonzales (United States) Jimmy Connors; 6–3, 7–5	(United States) Robert McKinley (United States) Dick Stockton	(United States) Dick Stockton (South Africa) Bob Hewitt	(United States) Charles Owens (United States) Steve Faulk (United States) Pancho Gonzales (United States) Jim McManus
30 Jul	Tanglewood International Tennis Classic; Clemmons, North Carolina, US; Group D Clay – $25,000 – 32S/16D	(South Africa) Bob Hewitt; 3–6, 6–3, 6–1	(Rhodesia) Andrew Pattison	(United States) Dick Stockton (United States) Steve Faulk	(United States) Butch Seewagen (New Zealand) Onny Parun (Australia) Ian Fletcher (United States) Jeff Austin
30 Jul	Tanglewood International Tennis Classic; Clemmons, North Carolina, US; Group D Clay – $25,000 – 32S/16D	(South Africa) Andrew Pattison (South Africa) Bob Hewitt; 6–4, 6–4	(United States) Jim McManus (United States) Jim Osborne	(United States) Dick Stockton (United States) Steve Faulk	(United States) Butch Seewagen (New Zealand) Onny Parun (Australia) Ian Fletcher (United States) Jeff Austin
31 Jul	Cincinnati Open; Cincinnati, Ohio, US ^{*} Group C Clay – $42,500 – 64S/32D	(United States) Jimmy Connors; 6–3, 6–3	(Argentina) Guillermo Vilas	(Chile) Jaime Pinto-Bravo (South Africa) Frew McMillan	(Australia) Barry Phillips-Moore (Rhodesia) Andrew Pattison (Japan) Jun Kamiwazumi (United States) Sandy Mayer
31 Jul	Cincinnati Open; Cincinnati, Ohio, US ^{*} Group C Clay – $42,500 – 64S/32D	(South Africa) Frew McMillan (South Africa) Bob Hewitt; 7–6, 6–4	(United States) Paul Gerken (Venezuela) Humphrey Hose	(Chile) Jaime Pinto-Bravo (South Africa) Frew McMillan	(Australia) Barry Phillips-Moore (Rhodesia) Andrew Pattison (Japan) Jun Kamiwazumi (United States) Sandy Mayer

=== August ===
Week	Tournament	Champions	Runners-up	Semifinalists	Quarterfinalists
7 Aug	U.S. Clay Court Championships; Indianapolis, Indiana, US ^{*} Group A Clay – $60,000 – 64S/32D	(South Africa) Bob Hewitt; 7–6, 6–1, 6–2	(United States) Jimmy Connors	(Japan) Toshiro Sakai (South Africa) Frew McMillan	(France) Patrice Dominguez (Australia) Colin Dibley (Czechoslovakia) Jan Kodeš (United States) Paul Gerken
7 Aug	U.S. Clay Court Championships; Indianapolis, Indiana, US ^{*} Group A Clay – $60,000 – 64S/32D	(South Africa) Frew McMillan (South Africa) Bob Hewitt; 6–2, 6–3	(Chile) Patricio Cornejo (Chile) Jaime Fillol	(Japan) Toshiro Sakai (South Africa) Frew McMillan	(France) Patrice Dominguez (Australia) Colin Dibley (Czechoslovakia) Jan Kodeš (United States) Paul Gerken
14 Aug	Rothmans Canadian Open Championships; Toronto, Ontario, Canada ^{*} Group A Clay – $70,000 – 128S/64D	(Romania) Ilie Năstase; 6–4, 6–3	(Rhodesia) Andrew Pattison	(Chile) Jaime Fillol (France) Patrick Proisy	(Colombia) Jairo Velasco (South Africa) Bob Hewitt (Argentina) Guillermo Vilas (Italy) Adriano Panatta
14 Aug	Rothmans Canadian Open Championships; Toronto, Ontario, Canada ^{*} Group A Clay – $70,000 – 128S/64D	(Romania) Ion Țiriac (Romania) Ilie Năstase; 7–6, 6–3	(Czechoslovakia) Jan Kodeš (Czechoslovakia) Jan Kukal	(Chile) Jaime Fillol (France) Patrick Proisy	(Colombia) Jairo Velasco (South Africa) Bob Hewitt (Argentina) Guillermo Vilas (Italy) Adriano Panatta
28 Aug	US Open; Forest Hills, New York, US ^{*} Grand Slam; Group AA; Singles – Doubles – Mixed doubles	(Romania) Ilie Năstase; 3–6, 6–3, 6–7, 6–4, 6–3	(United States) Arthur Ashe	(United States) Cliff Richey (United States) Tom Gorman	(United States) Stan Smith (South Africa) Frew McMillan (Australia) Fred Stolle (United States) Roscoe Tanner
28 Aug	US Open; Forest Hills, New York, US ^{*} Grand Slam; Group AA; Singles – Doubles – Mixed doubles	(South Africa) Cliff Drysdale (United Kingdom) Roger Taylor; 6–4, 7–6, 6–3	(Australia) Owen Davidson (Australia) John Newcombe	(United States) Cliff Richey (United States) Tom Gorman	(United States) Stan Smith (South Africa) Frew McMillan (Australia) Fred Stolle (United States) Roscoe Tanner
28 Aug	US Open; Forest Hills, New York, US ^{*} Grand Slam; Group AA; Singles – Doubles – Mixed doubles	(Australia) Margaret Court (United States) Marty Riessen; 6–3, 7–5	(United States) Rosemary Casals (Romania) Ilie Năstase	(United States) Cliff Richey (United States) Tom Gorman	(United States) Stan Smith (South Africa) Frew McMillan (Australia) Fred Stolle (United States) Roscoe Tanner

=== September ===
Week	Tournament	Champions	Runners-up	Semifinalists	Quarterfinalists
17 Sep	Central California Championships; Sacramento, California, US; Group C Hard – $25,000 – 32S/16D	(United States) Stan Smith; 6–4, 5–7, 6–4, 6–4	(Australia) Colin Dibley	(Rhodesia) Andrew Pattison (Australia) Raymond Moore	(United States) Erik van Dillen (United States) Rick Fisher (United States) Tom Edlefsen (United States) Alejandro Olmedo
17 Sep	Central California Championships; Sacramento, California, US; Group C Hard – $25,000 – 32S/16D	(United States) Stan Smith (United States) Erik van Dillen; 4–6, 6–2, 6–4	(France) Patrice Dominguez (France) Patrick Proisy	(Rhodesia) Andrew Pattison (Australia) Raymond Moore	(United States) Erik van Dillen (United States) Rick Fisher (United States) Tom Edlefsen (United States) Alejandro Olmedo
17 Sep	Rainier International Tennis Classic; Seattle, Washington, US; Group C Hard – $25,000 – 32S/8D	(Romania) Ilie Năstase; 6–4, 3–6, 6–3	(United States) Tom Gorman	(South Africa) Bob Hewitt (Chile) Jaime Fillol	(New Zealand) Onny Parun (Australia) Ian Fletcher (Australia) Ross Case (United States) Sherwood Stewart
17 Sep	Rainier International Tennis Classic; Seattle, Washington, US; Group C Hard – $25,000 – 32S/8D	(Australia) Geoff Masters (Australia) Ross Case; 4–6, 7–6, 6–4	(France) Jean-Baptiste Chanfreau (France) Wanaro N'Godrella	(South Africa) Bob Hewitt (Chile) Jaime Fillol	(New Zealand) Onny Parun (Australia) Ian Fletcher (Australia) Ross Case (United States) Sherwood Stewart
25 Sep	Golden Gate Pacific Coast Classic; Albany, California, US; Group C Carpet – $34,000 – 64S/32D	(United States) Jimmy Connors; 6–2, 7–6^{(5–3)}	(United States) Roscoe Tanner	(Rhodesia) Andrew Pattison (South Africa) Bob Hewitt	(South Africa) Frew McMillan (Chile) Jaime Fillol (France) Pierre Barthès (Australia) Colin Dibley
25 Sep	Golden Gate Pacific Coast Classic; Albany, California, US; Group C Carpet – $34,000 – 64S/32D	(South Africa) Frew McMillan (South Africa) Bob Hewitt; 6–2, 2–6, 6–2	(Sweden) Björn Borg (Sweden) Ove Nils Bengtson	(Rhodesia) Andrew Pattison (South Africa) Bob Hewitt	(South Africa) Frew McMillan (Chile) Jaime Fillol (France) Pierre Barthès (Australia) Colin Dibley
25 Sep	Pacific Southwest Open; Los Angeles, California, US; Group A Hard – $60,000 – 64S/64D; Singles – Doubles	(United States) Stan Smith; 6–4, 6–4	(United States) Roscoe Tanner	(Netherlands) Tom Okker (United States) Tom Gorman	(Spain) Manuel Orantes (Australia) Ken Rosewall (Australia) Raymond Moore (Australia) Bob Carmichael
25 Sep	Pacific Southwest Open; Los Angeles, California, US; Group A Hard – $60,000 – 64S/64D; Singles – Doubles	(United States) Pancho Gonzales (United States) Jimmy Connors; 6–3, 7–6	(Egypt) Ismail El Shafei (Australia) Brian Fairlie	(Netherlands) Tom Okker (United States) Tom Gorman	(Spain) Manuel Orantes (Australia) Ken Rosewall (Australia) Raymond Moore (Australia) Bob Carmichael

=== October ===
Week	Tournament	Champions	Runners-up	Semifinalists	Quarterfinalists
23 Oct	Trofeo Conde de Godó; Barcelona, Spain; Group A Clay – $66,250 – 32S/32D	(Czechoslovakia) Jan Kodeš; 6–3, 6–2, 6–3	(Spain) Manuel Orantes	(United States) Stan Smith (Romania) Ilie Năstase	(Rhodesia) Andrew Pattison (Australia) Colin Dibley (Spain) Andrés Gimeno (United States) Tom Gorman
23 Oct	Trofeo Conde de Godó; Barcelona, Spain; Group A Clay – $66,250 – 32S/32D	(Spain) Manuel Orantes (Spain) Juan Gisbert; 6–3, 3–6, 6–4	(South Africa) Frew McMillan (Romania) Ilie Năstase	(United States) Stan Smith (Romania) Ilie Năstase	(Rhodesia) Andrew Pattison (Australia) Colin Dibley (Spain) Andrés Gimeno (United States) Tom Gorman
30 Oct	Jean Becker Open; Paris, France; Group B Hard – $50,000 – 32S/32D; Singles – Doubles	(United States) Stan Smith; 6–2, 6–2, 7–5	(Spain) Andrés Gimeno	(Czechoslovakia) Jan Kodeš (United States) Tom Gorman	(France) Patrice Dominguez (Australia) Raymond Moore (United States) Jimmy Connors (Romania) Ilie Năstase
30 Oct	Jean Becker Open; Paris, France; Group B Hard – $50,000 – 32S/32D; Singles – Doubles	(France) François Jauffret (France) Pierre Barthès; 6–3, 6–2	(Spain) Andrés Gimeno (Spain) Juan Gisbert	(Czechoslovakia) Jan Kodeš (United States) Tom Gorman	(France) Patrice Dominguez (Australia) Raymond Moore (United States) Jimmy Connors (Romania) Ilie Năstase

=== November ===
Week	Tournament	Champions	Runners-up	Semifinalists	Quarterfinalists
12 Nov	Stockholm Open; Stockholm, Sweden; Group A Hard – $63,000 – 64S/32D; Singles – Doubles	(United States) Stan Smith; 6–4, 6–3	(Netherlands) Tom Okker	(United States) Marty Riessen (Romania) Ilie Năstase	(Socialist Federal Republic of Yugoslavia) Nikola Pilić (United Kingdom) Roger Taylor (Rhodesia) Andrew Pattison (South Africa) Cliff Drysdale
12 Nov	Stockholm Open; Stockholm, Sweden; Group A Hard – $63,000 – 64S/32D; Singles – Doubles	(United States) Marty Riessen (Netherlands) Tom Okker; 7–5, 7–6	(Australia) Colin Dibley (Australia) Roy Emerson	(United States) Marty Riessen (Romania) Ilie Năstase	(Socialist Federal Republic of Yugoslavia) Nikola Pilić (United Kingdom) Roger Taylor (Rhodesia) Andrew Pattison (South Africa) Cliff Drysdale
18 Nov	Dewar Cup; Nottingham/London, England; Carpet – 32S/16D	(Romania) Ilie Năstase; 6–4, 6–3	(United States) Tom Gorman	(United States) Jimmy Connors (New Zealand) Onny Parun	(France) Patrick Proisy (South Africa) Frew McMillan (Australia) Barry Phillips-Moore (Rhodesia) Andrew Pattison
28 Nov	Masters; Barcelona, Spain; Hard (i) – $55,000 – 8S	(Romania) Ilie Năstase; 6–3, 6–2, 3–6, 2–6, 6–3	(United States) Stan Smith		

^{*} Tournaments combined with a women's Grand Prix tour event.

== Points distribution ==
Category	W	F	SF	QF	R16	R32	R64
Group AA tournaments	100	75	50	25	12	6	–
Group A tournaments	75	52	37	18	9	–	–
Group B tournaments	50	36	25	18	6	–	–
Group C tournaments	30	20	10	5	3	–	–
Group D tournaments	20	12	6	4	–	–	–

No points were awarded for first round losers

== Standings ==
Player	Tournaments played	Points	Prize money
(Romania) Ilie Năstase	24	659	£21,000
(United States) Stan Smith	19	587	£14,700
(Spain) Manuel Orantes	19	468	£10,500
(Czechoslovakia) Jan Kodeš	14	332	£8,400
(Spain) Andrés Gimeno	20	319	£6,720
(South Africa) Bob Hewitt	15	263	£5,460
(United States) Jimmy Connors	22	251	£5,040
(United States) Tom Gorman	19	227	£4,620
(Rhodesia) Andrew Pattison	21	204	£4,200
(France) Patrick Proisy	13	172	£3,780

Cliff Richey, Roscoe Tanner, Alex Metreveli, Tom Okker and Arthur Ashe played too few Grand Prix tournaments to qualify for prize money.

== Grand Prix rankings ==
As of 1 January 1972
Rank	Name
1 (tie)	Stan Smith (USA)
1 (tie)	John Newcombe (AUS)
3	Ken Rosewall (AUS)
4	Rod Laver (AUS)
5	Jan Kodeš (TCH)
6	Tom Okker (NED)
7	Arthur Ashe (USA)
8	Ilie Năstase (ROM)
9	Cliff Drysdale (RSA)
10	Marty Riessen (USA)

Year-end rankings (December 1972)
Rank	Name	Change
1	Stan Smith (USA)	=
2	Ilie Năstase (ROM)	▲ +6
3	Ken Rosewall (AUS)	=

== List of tournament winners ==
The list of winners and number of singles titles won, alphabetically by last name:

- (United States) Jimmy Connors (6) Roanoke, Queen's Club, Columbus, Cincinnati, Albany, Jacksonville
- (Australia) John Cooper (1) Hilversum
- (Australia) Colin Dibley (1) Kitzbühel
- (United States) Tom Edlefsen (1) Kansas City
- (Spain) Andrés Gimeno (3) Los Angeles, French Open, Eastbourne, Gstaad
- (United States) Pancho Gonzalez (1) Des Moines
- (South Africa) Bob Hewitt (4) Bournemouth, Bristol, Tanglewood, Indianapolis
- (Czechoslovakia) Jan Kodeš (1) Barcelona
- (West Germany) Karl Meiler (1) Buenos Aires
- (Soviet Union) Alex Metreveli (3) Sydney, Hobart, Adelaide
- (Romania) Ilie Năstase (11) Baltimore, Omaha, Monte Carlo, Madrid, Nice, Düsseldorf, Montreal, South Orange, Seattle, US Open, London, Masters
- (Spain) Manuel Orantes (5) Caracas, Rome, Brussels, Hamburg, Båstad
- (United States) Cliff Richey (2) London Indoor, Johannesburg
- (United States) Stan Smith (7) Salisbury, Hampton, Wimbledon, Washington, D.C., Sacramento, Los Angeles, Paris Bercy, Stockholm
- (United Kingdom) Roger Taylor (1) Merion

The following players won their first Grand Prix title in 1972:

- (Australia) Colin Dibley Kitzbühel
- (South Africa) Bob Hewitt Bournemouth

== See also ==
- 1972 World Championship Tennis circuit
- 1972 USLTA Indoor Circuit
- 1972 Women's Grand Prix
- 1972 Virginia Slims Circuit
