= 1972 USLTA Indoor Circuit =

Details
- Duration: 4 December 1971 – 2 February 1972
- Edition: 2nd
- Tournaments: 14

Achievements (singles)
- Most titles: (Romania) Ilie Năstase (2)
- Most finals: (United States) Jimmy Connors (3)

The 1972 USLTA Indoor Circuit was a professional tennis circuit held in the United States that year. It consisted of 14 tournaments and was organized by Bill Riordan and sanctioned by the United States Lawn Tennis Association (USLTA).

Players who reached at least the quarter-finals of the six top tournaments received ranking points. Ilie Năstase won the first prize of $15,000 from a total bonus pool of $50,000 which was linked to the Boise Cascade Classic series of 13 U.S. indoor tournaments.

== Schedule ==
=== January ===
Week of	Tournament	Champion	Runner-up	Semifinalists	Quarterfinalists
9 Jan	Baltimore International Indoor; Baltimore, Maryland, US; Carpet (i) – 16S/8D	(Romania) Ilie Năstase; 1–6, 6–4, 7–6	(United States) Jimmy Connors	(United States) Clark Graebner (France) Pierre Barthès	(Chile) Jaime Fillol (Romania) Ion Țiriac (United States) Frank Froehling (Pakistan) Haroon Rahim
9 Jan	Baltimore International Indoor; Baltimore, Maryland, US; Carpet (i) – 16S/8D	(United States) Jimmy Connors (Pakistan) Haroon Rahim; 6–3, 3–6, 6–3	(France) Pierre Barthès (United States) Clark Graebner	(United States) Clark Graebner (France) Pierre Barthès	(Chile) Jaime Fillol (Romania) Ion Țiriac (United States) Frank Froehling (Pakistan) Haroon Rahim
12 Jan	Jacksonville International Indoor; Jacksonville, Florida, US	(United States) Jimmy Connors; 7–5, 6–4	(United States) Clark Graebner	(Chile) Jaime Fillol (United Kingdom) Gerald Battrick	(Sweden) Ove Bengtson (Pakistan) Haroon Rahim (United States) Dick Stockton (United States) Bill Higgins
12 Jan	Jacksonville International Indoor; Jacksonville, Florida, US	(United States) Jim McManus (United States) Jim Osborne; 4–6, 7–6, 6–4	(United States) Frank Froehling (Czechoslovakia) Vladimír Zedník	(Chile) Jaime Fillol (United Kingdom) Gerald Battrick	(Sweden) Ove Bengtson (Pakistan) Haroon Rahim (United States) Dick Stockton (United States) Bill Higgins
22 Jan	Rothmans International; London, UK	(United States) Cliff Richey; 7–5, 6–7, 7–5, 6–0	(United States) Clark Graebner	(Romania) Ilie Năstase (Australia) Lew Hoad	(Romania) Ion Țiriac (United States) Pancho Gonzales (United Kingdom) Gerald Battrick (France) Georges Goven
22 Jan	Rothmans International; London, UK	(United States) Tom Gorman (United States) Clark Graebner; 6–7, 7–5, 6–4, 4–6, 6–4	(South Africa) Bob Hewitt (South Africa) Frew McMillan	(Romania) Ilie Năstase (Australia) Lew Hoad	(Romania) Ion Țiriac (United States) Pancho Gonzales (United Kingdom) Gerald Battrick (France) Georges Goven
23 Jan	Roanoke International Tournament; Roanoke, Virginia, US; Carpet (i) – 9S/8D	(United States) Jimmy Connors; 6–4, 7–6	(Czechoslovakia) Vladimír Zedník	(United States) Frank Froehling (Chile) Jaime Fillol	(Sweden) Ove Bengtson (Brazil) Thomaz Koch (Pakistan) Haroon Rahim (New Zealand) Ian Crookenden
23 Jan	Roanoke International Tournament; Roanoke, Virginia, US; Carpet (i) – 9S/8D	(United States) Jimmy Connors (Pakistan) Haroon Rahim; 6–4, 3–6, 6–3	(New Zealand) Ian Crookenden (Czechoslovakia) Vladimír Zedník	(United States) Frank Froehling (Chile) Jaime Fillol	(Sweden) Ove Bengtson (Brazil) Thomaz Koch (Pakistan) Haroon Rahim (New Zealand) Ian Crookenden
30 Jan	Midlands International; Omaha, Nebraska, US; Carpet (i) – 16S/8D	(Romania) Ilie Năstase; 2–6, 6–1, 6–1	(Romania) Ion Țiriac	(France) Georges Goven (United States) Jimmy Connors	(Chile) Jaime Fillol (Spain) Andrés Gimeno (Spain) Manuel Orantes (Brazil) Thomaz Koch
30 Jan	Midlands International; Omaha, Nebraska, US; Carpet (i) – 16S/8D	(Romania) Ilie Năstase (Romania) Ion Țiriac; 5–7, 6–4, 7–6	(Spain) Andrés Gimeno (Spain) Manuel Orantes	(France) Georges Goven (United States) Jimmy Connors	(Chile) Jaime Fillol (Spain) Andrés Gimeno (Spain) Manuel Orantes (Brazil) Thomaz Koch

=== February ===
Week of	Tournament	Champion	Runner-up	Semifinalists	Quarterfinalists
1 Feb	St. Luke's Hospital International; Cleveland, Ohio, US; Hard – 8S/4D	(Czechoslovakia) Vladimír Zedník; 7–6, 6–7, 4–6, 6–2, 6–3	(Pakistan) Haroon Rahim	(France) Pierre Barthès (Sweden) Ove Bengtson	(Chile) Patricio Cornejo (United States) Jim Osborne (New Zealand) Onny Parun (United Kingdom) Gerald Battrick
1 Feb	St. Luke's Hospital International; Cleveland, Ohio, US; Hard – 8S/4D	(United Kingdom) Gerald Battrick (New Zealand) Onny Parun; 6–4, 5–7, 6–3	(Sweden) Ove Bengtson (Czechoslovakia) Vladimír Zedník	(France) Pierre Barthès (Sweden) Ove Bengtson	(Chile) Patricio Cornejo (United States) Jim Osborne (New Zealand) Onny Parun (United Kingdom) Gerald Battrick
6 Feb	Des Moines International; Des Moines, Iowa, US; 16S/8D	(United States) Pancho Gonzales; 3–6, 4–6, 6–3, 6–4, 6–2	(France) Georges Goven	(Pakistan) Haroon Rahim (Spain) Juan Gisbert	(United States) Cliff Richey (Brazil) Thomaz Koch (United States) Jim Osborne (United Kingdom) Gerald Battrick
6 Feb	Des Moines International; Des Moines, Iowa, US; 16S/8D	(United States) Jim McManus (United States) Jim Osborne; 6–2, 6–3	(France) Georges Goven (Brazil) Thomaz Koch	(Pakistan) Haroon Rahim (Spain) Juan Gisbert	(United States) Cliff Richey (Brazil) Thomaz Koch (United States) Jim Osborne (United Kingdom) Gerald Battrick
6 Feb	Greater Kansas City International; Kansas City, Missouri, US; 16S/8D	(United States) Tom Edlefsen; 6–3, 6–3	(United States) Erik van Dillen	(France) Pierre Barthès (Socialist Federal Republic of Yugoslavia) Željko Franulović	(Romania) Ilie Năstase (Spain) Manuel Orantes (Romania) Ion Țiriac (United States) Clark Graebner
6 Feb	Greater Kansas City International; Kansas City, Missouri, US; 16S/8D	(Romania) Ilie Năstase (Romania) Ion Țiriac; 6–7, 6–4, 7–6	(Spain) Andrés Gimeno (Spain) Manuel Orantes	(France) Pierre Barthès (Socialist Federal Republic of Yugoslavia) Željko Franulović	(Romania) Ilie Năstase (Spain) Manuel Orantes (Romania) Ion Țiriac (United States) Clark Graebner
14 Feb	The May Co. International (Note: Also part of the 1972 Grand Prix circuit); Los Angeles, California, US; Group C 32S/16D	(Spain) Andrés Gimeno; 6–3, 2–6, 6–2	(France) Pierre Barthès	(United States) Jimmy Connors (Brazil) Thomaz Koch	(Czechoslovakia) Vladimír Zedník (United States) Cliff Richey (United States) Pancho Gonzales (Romania) Ilie Năstase
14 Feb	The May Co. International; Los Angeles, California, US; Group C 32S/16D	(United States) Jim Osborne (United States) Jim McManus; 6–2, 5–7, 6–4	(Romania) Ilie Năstase (Romania) Ion Țiriac	(United States) Jimmy Connors (Brazil) Thomaz Koch	(Czechoslovakia) Vladimír Zedník (United States) Cliff Richey (United States) Pancho Gonzales (Romania) Ilie Năstase
20 Feb	U.S. National Indoor Championships; Salisbury, Maryland, US; Group B Hard – 64S/32D	(United States) Stan Smith; 5–7, 6–2, 6–3, 6–4	(Romania) Ilie Năstase	(Pakistan) Haroon Rahim (United Kingdom) Gerald Battrick	(Chile) Jaime Fillol (United States) Clark Graebner (Spain) Manuel Orantes (United States) Tom Gorman
20 Feb	U.S. National Indoor Championships; Salisbury, Maryland, US; Group B Hard – 64S/32D	(Spain) Manuel Orantes (Spain) Andrés Gimeno; 6–4, 6–3	(Spain) Juan Gisbert (Czechoslovakia) Vladimír Zedník	(Pakistan) Haroon Rahim (United Kingdom) Gerald Battrick	(Chile) Jaime Fillol (United States) Clark Graebner (Spain) Manuel Orantes (United States) Tom Gorman
28 Feb	Clean Air Classic; New York, US; Group C 64S	(United States) Stan Smith; 4–6, 7–5, 6–4, 6–1	(Spain) Juan Gisbert	(United States) Cliff Richey (Romania) Ilie Năstase	(United States) Alejandro Olmedo (Sweden) Ove Nils Bengtson (Spain) Andrés Gimeno (United States) Jimmy Connors

=== March ===
Week of	Tournament	Champion	Runner-up	Semifinalists	Quarterfinalists
5 Mar	National Indoor Championships; Hampton, Virginia, US; Group C Hard – 32S/16D; Singles – Doubles	(United States) Stan Smith; 6–3, 6–2, 6–7^{(3–5)}, 6–4	(Romania) Ilie Năstase	(Spain) Andrés Gimeno (United States) Cliff Richey	(Spain) Juan Gisbert (United States) Jimmy Connors (France) Georges Goven (New Zealand) Ian Crookenden
5 Mar	National Indoor Championships; Hampton, Virginia, US; Group C Hard – 32S/16D; Singles – Doubles	(Romania) Ion Țiriac (Romania) Ilie Năstase; 7–5, 7–5	(Spain) Andrés Gimeno (Spain) Manuel Orantes	(Spain) Andrés Gimeno (United States) Cliff Richey	(Spain) Juan Gisbert (United States) Jimmy Connors (France) Georges Goven (New Zealand) Ian Crookenden
6 Mar	Equity Funding International; Washington D.C., US; Carpet – 32S/16D	(United States) Stan Smith; 6–3, 6–2, 6–7, 6–4	(United States) Jimmy Connors	(United States) Tom Gorman (Spain) Manuel Orantes	(United States) Jim Osborne (France) Pierre Barthès (United States) Cliff Richey (Romania) Ilie Năstase
6 Mar	Equity Funding International; Washington D.C., US; Carpet – 32S/16D	(United States) Cliff Richey (United States) Tom Edlefsen; 6–4, 6–3	(United States) Clark Graebner (Brazil) Thomaz Koch	(United States) Tom Gorman (Spain) Manuel Orantes	(United States) Jim Osborne (France) Pierre Barthès (United States) Cliff Richey (Romania) Ilie Năstase

=== December ===
Week of	Tournament	Champion	Runner-up	Semifinalists	Quarterfinalists
9 Dec	Clean Air Classic; Seventh Regiment Armory, New York City, US; Carpet (i) – 16S/8D	(United States) Charlie Pasarell; 4–6, 6–2, 6–2	(United States) Pancho Gonzales	(Sweden) Ove Bengtson (South Africa) Frew McMillan	(United States) Eddie Dibbs (United States) Paul Gerken (United States) Dennis Ralston (Pakistan) Haroon Rahim
9 Dec	Clean Air Classic; Seventh Regiment Armory, New York City, US; Carpet (i) – 16S/8D	(United States) Clark Graebner (South Africa) Frew McMillan; 6–3, 6–2	(United States) Brian Gottfried (United States) Dick Stockton	(Sweden) Ove Bengtson (South Africa) Frew McMillan	(United States) Eddie Dibbs (United States) Paul Gerken (United States) Dennis Ralston (Pakistan) Haroon Rahim

== See also ==
- 1972 Grand Prix circuit
- 1972 World Championship Tennis circuit
