= 1971 USLTA Indoor Circuit =

Details
- Duration: January 25 – March 11
- Edition: 1st
- Tournaments: 6

Achievements (singles)
- Most titles: (Romania) Ilie Năstase (3)
- Most finals: (Romania) Ilie Năstase (4)

The 1971 USLTA Indoor Circuit, also known as the U.S. Indoor Winter Circuit, was a professional tennis circuit held in the United States that year. It consisted of six tournaments and was organized by Bill Riordan and sanctioned by the United States Lawn Tennis Association (USLTA). A $40,000 bonus pool was made available via the circuit sponsor Gillette for the top 10 points finishers. Total prize money for the tour, including the bonus, was $220,000.

== Schedule ==
=== January ===
Week of	Tournament	Champion	Runner-up	Semifinalists	Quarterfinalists
25 Jan	Midlands International; Omaha, Nebraska, US $15,000 - Carpet (i) – 16S/8D	(Romania) Ilie Năstase; 6–4, 6–3, 6–1	(United States) Cliff Richey	(Brazil) Thomaz Koch (United States) Jim McManus	(United States) Tom Gorman (United States) Frank Froehling (Pakistan) Haroon Rahim (United States) Dick Stockton
25 Jan	Midlands International; Omaha, Nebraska, US $15,000 - Carpet (i) – 16S/8D	(United States) Clark Graebner (Brazil) Thomaz Koch; 6–4, 4–6, 6–4	(United States) Jim McManus (United States) Jim Osborne	(Brazil) Thomaz Koch (United States) Jim McManus	(United States) Tom Gorman (United States) Frank Froehling (Pakistan) Haroon Rahim (United States) Dick Stockton

=== February ===
Week of	Tournament	Champion	Runner-up	Semifinalists	Quarterfinalists
4 Feb	Pontiac International; Washington D.C., US $6,500 – carpet (i) – 16S	(Chile) Jaime Fillol; 6–1, 3–6, 6–4, 6–7, 6–4	(Brazil) Thomaz Koch	(United States) Cliff Richey (Spain) Manuel Orantes	(Jamaica) Richard Russell (United States) Steve Fiske (Chile) Patricio Cornejo (Pakistan) Haroon Rahim
9 Feb	Clean Air Classic; Hawthorne, New Jersey, US; New York City, New York, US $30,000 – carpet (i) – 32S/16D	(Socialist Federal Republic of Yugoslavia) Željko Franulović; 6–2, 5–7, 6–4, 7–5	(United States) Clark Graebner	(Brazil) Thomaz Koch (Romania) Ilie Năstase	(United States) Jim Osborne (Pakistan) Haroon Rahim (United States) Tom Gorman (United States) Cliff Richey
9 Feb	Clean Air Classic; Hawthorne, New Jersey, US; New York City, New York, US $30,000 – carpet (i) – 32S/16D	(Spain) Juan Gisbert, Sr. (Spain) Manuel Orantes; 7–6, 6–2	(United States) Jimmy Connors (Pakistan) Haroon Rahim	(Brazil) Thomaz Koch (Romania) Ilie Năstase	(United States) Jim Osborne (Pakistan) Haroon Rahim (United States) Tom Gorman (United States) Cliff Richey
20 Feb	U.S. National Indoor Championships; Salisbury, Maryland, US $50,000 – hard – 64S/32D	(United States) Clark Graebner; 2–6, 7–6, 1–6, 7–6, 6–0	(United States) Cliff Richey	(Pakistan) Haroon Rahim (United Kingdom) Gerald Battrick	(Chile) Jaime Fillol (United States) Clark Graebner (Spain) Manuel Orantes (United States) Tom Gorman
20 Feb	U.S. National Indoor Championships; Salisbury, Maryland, US $50,000 – hard – 64S/32D	(Spain) Juan Gisbert, Sr. (Spain) Manuel Orantes; 7–6, 6–2	(United States) Clark Graebner (Brazil) Thomaz Koch	(Pakistan) Haroon Rahim (United Kingdom) Gerald Battrick	(Chile) Jaime Fillol (United States) Clark Graebner (Spain) Manuel Orantes (United States) Tom Gorman
25 Feb	Macon International; Macon, Georgia, US $25,000 – carpet (i) – 42S/22D	(Socialist Federal Republic of Yugoslavia) Željko Franulović; 6–4, 7–5, 5–7, 3–6, 7–6^{(5–4)}	(Romania) Ilie Năstase	(United States) Clark Graebner (Chile) Jaime Fillol	(Brazil) Edison Mandarino (United States) Tom Edlefsen (Spain) Juan Gisbert, Sr. (United States) Tom Gorman
25 Feb	Macon International; Macon, Georgia, US $25,000 – carpet (i) – 42S/22D	(United States) Clark Graebner (Brazil) Thomaz Koch; 6–3, 6–3	(Socialist Federal Republic of Yugoslavia) Željko Franulović (Czechoslovakia) Jan Kodeš	(United States) Clark Graebner (Chile) Jaime Fillol	(Brazil) Edison Mandarino (United States) Tom Edlefsen (Spain) Juan Gisbert, Sr. (United States) Tom Gorman

=== March ===
Week of	Tournament	Champion	Runner-up	Semifinalists	Quarterfinalists
1 Mar	National Indoor Championships; Hampton, Virginia, US $35,000 – carpet (i) – 32S/16D; Singles – Doubles	(Romania) Ilie Năstase; 7–5, 6–4, 7–6^{(5–0)}	(United States) Clark Graebner	(Socialist Federal Republic of Yugoslavia) Željko Franulović (Romania) Ion Țiriac	(United States) Frank Froehling (Chile) Jaime Fillol (Czechoslovakia) Jan Kodeš (Brazil) Thomaz Koch
1 Mar	National Indoor Championships; Hampton, Virginia, US $35,000 – carpet (i) – 32S/16D; Singles – Doubles	(Romania) Ilie Năstase (Romania) Ion Țiriac; 6–4, 4–6, 7–5	(United States) Clark Graebner (Brazil) Thomaz Koch	(Socialist Federal Republic of Yugoslavia) Željko Franulović (Romania) Ion Țiriac	(United States) Frank Froehling (Chile) Jaime Fillol (Czechoslovakia) Jan Kodeš (Brazil) Thomaz Koch

== Bonus pool ==
Rank	Player	Bonus
1.	(United States) Clark Graebner	$10,000
2.	(Romania) Ilie Năstase	$7,500
3.	(Socialist Federal Republic of Yugoslavia) Željko Franulović	$5,000

== See also ==
- 1971 Grand Prix circuit
- 1971 World Championship Tennis circuit
