= 1972 Buckeye Tennis Championships – Singles =

Tennis tournament event

Singles
- 1972 Buckeye Tennis Championships

Final
- Champion: (United States) Jimmy Connors
- Runner-up: (Rhodesia) Andrew Pattison
- Score: 7–5, 6–3, 7–5

Details
- Draw: 32

Events
Singles	Doubles
← 1971 ·	Columbus Open	· 1973 →

The 1972 Buckeye Tennis Championships – Singles was an event of the 1972 Buckeye Tennis Championships tennis tournament and was played at the Buckeye Boys Ranch in Grove City, Columbus, Ohio in the United States between July 17 and July 23, 1972. Tom Gorman was the defending champion, but did not compete in this edition. First-seeded Jimmy Connors won the singles title, defeating Andrew Pattison 7–5, 6–3, 7–5 in the final.

== Seeds ==
1. (United States) Jimmy Connors (Champion)
2. (South Africa) Bob Hewitt (Semifinals)

== Draw ==
=== Key ===
- Q = Qualifier
- WC = Wild card
- LL = Lucky loser
- Alt = Alternate
- SE = Special exempt
- PR = Protected ranking
- ITF = ITF entry
- JE = Junior exempt
- w/o = Walkover
- r = Retired
- d = Defaulted
- SR = Special ranking

=== Finals ===
Semifinals
1	(United States) Jimmy Connors	6	7
(United States) Dick Stockton	3	6
(Zimbabwe) Andrew Pattison	6	7
2	(South Africa) Bob Hewitt	0	5

Final
1	(United States) Jimmy Connors	7	6	7
(Zimbabwe) Andrew Pattison	5	3	5

=== Top half ===
First Round
1	(United States) Jimmy Connors	7	6
(India) Vijay Amritraj	5	0
(United States) Paul Gerken	6	7	6
(United States) Jeff Austin	7	6	3
(United States) Charles Owens	6	6
(Canada) Peter Burwash	2	2
(United States) Jim Osborne	6	7
(United States) Mike Kreiss	3	5
(United States) Dick Stockton	5	6	6
(Colombia) Iván Molina	7	2	4
(South Africa) Pat Cramer	6	6
(Colombia) Jairo Velasco Sr.	1	4
(United States) Steve Faulk	7	6
(United States) Dick Dell	6	3
(New Zealand) Jeff Simpson	6	6
(United States) Richard Johnson	4	3

Second Round
1	(United States) Jimmy Connors	6	6
(United States) Paul Gerken	4	4
(United States) Charles Owens	5	7	6
(United States) Jim Osborne	7	6	4
(United States) Dick Stockton	3	6	6
(South Africa) Pat Cramer	6	3	4
(United States) Steve Faulk	6	6
(New Zealand) Jeff Simpson	2	3

Quarterfinals
1	(United States) Jimmy Connors	6	6
(United States) Charles Owens	2	2
(United States) Dick Stockton	6	6
(United States) Steve Faulk	0	2

Semifinals
1	(United States) Jimmy Connors	6	7
(United States) Dick Stockton	3	6

=== Bottom half ===
First Round
(United States) Robert Kreiss	6	7
(Argentina) Guillermo Vilas	3	6
(Zimbabwe) Andrew Pattison	6	6
(United States) Bill Glaves	0	2
(United States) Mike Estep	7	6
(United States) Jim Delaney	6	1
(United States) Pancho Gonzales	w/o
(France) Georges Goven
(United States) Jim McManus	2	6	6
(United States) Dan Birchmore	6	3	2
(United States) Zan Guerry	6	6	7
(India) Anand Amritraj	7	1	6
(United States) Robert McKinley	6	7
(United States) Chico Hagey	4	5
2	(South Africa) Bob Hewitt	6	6	6
(United States) Butch Seewagen	7	4	2

Second Round
(United States) Robert Kreiss	3	6
(Zimbabwe) Andrew Pattison	6	7
(United States) Mike Estep	3	3
(United States) Pancho Gonzales	6	6
(United States) Jim McManus	4	6	7
(United States) Zan Guerry	6	3	5
(United States) Robert McKinley	6	3
2	(South Africa) Bob Hewitt	7	6

Quarterfinals
(Zimbabwe) Andrew Pattison	2	6	6
(United States) Pancho Gonzales	6	3	4
(United States) Jim McManus	1	1
2	(South Africa) Bob Hewitt	6	6

Semifinals
(Zimbabwe) Andrew Pattison	6	7
2	(South Africa) Bob Hewitt	0	5
