= Kreiss (surname) =

Kreiss is a surname. Notable people with this surname include:

- Lisa Bonder-Kreiss (born 1965), American tennis player
- Fanni Kreiss (born 1989), Hungarian fencer
- George Kreiss (1830–1907), American politician
- Gunilla Kreiss (born 1958), Swedish mathematician, daughter of Heinz-Otto
- Heinz-Otto Kreiss (1930–2015), German-Swedish mathematician, father of Gunilla
- Loren B. Kreiss (born 1981), American Interior designer and entrepreneur
- Murray Kreiss, founder of the Kreiss furniture company
- Robert Kreiss (born 1953), American tennis player
- Jonathan Kreiss-Tomkins (born 1989), American politician
- Yitshak Kreiss (born 1965), Israeli physician and medical administrator
