= 1981 National Revenue Tennis Classic =

- Date: August 3–9
- Edition: 12th
- Category: Grand Prix
- Draw: 32S / 16D
- Prize money: $75,000
- Surface: Hard / outdoor
- Location: Columbus, Ohio, United States
- Venue: Buckeye Boys Ranch

Champions

Singles
- (United States) Brian Teacher

Doubles
- (United States) Bruce Manson / (United States) Brian Teacher
← 1980 ·	Columbus Open	· 1982 →

The 1981 National Revenue Tennis Classic, also known as the Buckeye Championships, was a men's tennis tournament played on outdoor hardcourts at the Buckeye Boys Ranch in Grove City, a suburb of Columbus, Ohio in the United States that was part of the 1981 Volvo Grand Prix circuit. It was the 12th edition of the tournament and was held from August 3 through August 9, 1981. First-seeded Brian Teacher won the singles title and earned $15,000 first-prize money.

== Finals ==
=== Singles ===
(United States) Brian Teacher defeated (United States) John Austin 6–3, 6–2

- It was Teacher's only singles title of the year and the 5th of his career.

=== Doubles ===
(United States) Bruce Manson / (United States) Brian Teacher defeated (India) Anand Amritraj / (India) Vijay Amritraj 6–1, 6–1
