= 1971 U.S. National Indoor Tennis Championships =

- Date: February 14–21
- Edition: 1st
- Category: USLTA Indoor Circuit
- Draw: 48S / 32D
- Prize money: $50,000
- Surface: Carpet / indoor
- Location: Salisbury, Maryland, U.S.
- Venue: Wicomico Youth and Civic Center

Champions

Singles
- (United States) Clark Graebner

Doubles
- (Spain) Juan Gisbert, Sr. / (Spain) Manuel Orantes
U.S. National Indoor Championships	· 1972 →

The 1971 U.S. National Indoor Tennis Championships was a men's tennis tournament held at the Wicomico Youth and Civic Center in Salisbury, Maryland in the United States. The event was part of the 1971 USLTA Indoor Circuit and was also a Grade B event on the 1971 Grand Prix Circuit. It was the first edition of the tournament and was held from February 14 through February 21, 1971, and played on indoor carpet courts. Second-seeded national player Clark Graebner won the singles title after saving two matchpoints in the final against first-seeded Cliff Richey and earned $9,000 first-prize money.

== Finals ==
=== Singles ===
(United States) Clark Graebner defeated (United States) Cliff Richey 2–6, 7–6^{(5–4)}, 1–6, 7–6^{(5–4)}, 6–0

- It was Graebner's 1st singles title of his career in the Open Era.

=== Doubles ===
(Spain) Juan Gisbert, Sr. / (Spain) Manuel Orantes defeated (United States) Clark Graebner / (Brazil) Thomaz Koch 7–6, 6–2

== See also ==
- 1971 National Indoor Championships
- 1971 U.S. Professional Indoor
