= 1972 Equity Funding International =

- Date: March 6–12
- Edition: 1st
- Category: Grand Prix (Group C); USLTA Indoor circuit
- Draw: 32S / 16D
- Prize money: $25,000
- Surface: Carpet / indoor
- Location: Washington D.C., United States
- Venue: McDonough Gymnasium, Georgetown University

Champions

Singles
- (United States) Stan Smith

Doubles
- (United States) Cliff Richey / (United States) Tom Edlefsen
Washington Indoor	· 1973 →

The 1972 Equity Funding International, also known as the Washington Indoor, was a men's tennis tournament played on indoor carpet courts at Georgetown University's McDonough Gymnasium in Washington D.C. in the United States that was part of Group C of the 1972 Grand Prix circuit as well as of the 1972 USLTA Indoor Circuit. It was the inaugural edition of the tournament and was held from March 6 through March 12, 1972. First-seeded Stan Smith won the singles title and earned $5,000 first-prize money.

== Finals ==
=== Singles ===
(United States) Stan Smith defeated (United States) Jimmy Connors 6–3, 6–2, 6–7, 6–4

- It was Smith' 4th singles title of the year and the 40th of his career.

=== Doubles ===
(United States) Cliff Richey / (United States) Tom Edlefsen defeated (United States) Clark Graebner / (Brazil) Thomaz Koch 6–4, 6–3
