= 1972 Buckeye Tennis Championships =

- Date: July 17–23
- Edition: 3rd
- Category: Grand Prix (Group D)
- Draw: 32S / 16D
- Prize money: $25,000
- Surface: Hard / outdoor
- Location: Grove City, Columbus, Ohio, United States
- Venue: Buckeye Boys Ranch

Champions

Singles
- (United States) Jimmy Connors

Doubles
- (United States) Jimmy Connors / (United States) Pancho Gonzales
← 1971 ·	Columbus Open	· 1973 →

The 1972 Buckeye Tennis Championships, als known as the Buckeye Classic, was a men's tennis tournament played on outdoor hard courts at the Buckeye Boys Ranch in Grove City, Columbus, Ohio in the United States that was part of Group D of the 1972 Grand Prix circuit. It was the third edition of the tournament and was held from July 17 through July 23, 1972. First-seeded Jimmy Connors won the singles title and earned $5,000 first-prize money.

== Finals ==
=== Singles ===
(United States) Jimmy Connors defeated (Rhodesia) Andrew Pattison 7–5, 6–3, 7–5

- It was Connors' fourth singles title of the year and of his career.

=== Doubles ===
(United States) Jimmy Connors / (United States) Pancho Gonzales defeated (United States) Robert McKinley / (United States) Dick Stockton 6–3, 7–5
