= 1970 Buckeye Tennis Championships =

- Date: August 14–16
- Edition: 1st
- Category: Independent
- Draw: 8S / 4D
- Prize money: $12,000
- Surface: Hard / outdoor
- Location: Grove City, Columbus, Ohio, United States
- Venue: Buckeye Boys Ranch Stadium

Champions

Singles
- (United States) Bob Lutz

Doubles
- (United States) Bob Lutz / (United States) Stan Smith
Columbus Open	· 1971 →

The 1970 Buckeye Tennis Championships was a men's tennis tournament played on outdoor hard courts at the newly created 3,200 seat Buckeye Boys Ranch Stadium in Grove City, Columbus, Ohio in the United States. It was an independent, invitational tournament i.e. not part of the 1970 Grand Prix circuit but it was sanctioned by the United States Lawn Tennis Association (USLTA). It was the inaugural edition of the tournament and was held from August 14 through August 16, 1970. Bob Lutz won the singles title and earned $4,000 first-prize money.

== Finals ==
=== Singles ===
(United States) Bob Lutz defeated (United States) Tom Gorman 7–5, 1–6, 6–4, 6–2

- It was Lutz' second singles title of the year and of his career.

=== Doubles ===
(United States) Bob Lutz / (United States) Stan Smith defeated (United States) Tom Gorman / (Australia) Ray Ruffels 6–2, 8–6
