= 1972 Roanoke International =

- Date: January 21–23
- Edition: 1st
- Category: USLTA Indoor Circuit
- Draw: 9S / 8D
- Prize money: $7,500
- Surface: Carpet / indoor
- Location: Roanoke, Virginia, U.S.
- Venue: Roanoke Civic Center

Champions

Singles
- (United States) Jimmy Connors

Doubles
- (United States) Jimmy Connors / (Pakistan) Haroon Rahim
| Roanoke International Tennis Tournament | · 1973 → |

The 1972 Roanoke International was a men's tennis tournament played on indoor carpet courts at the Roanoke Civic Center in Roanoke, Virginia, in the United States that was part of the 1972 USLTA Indoor Circuit. It was the inaugural edition of the event and was held from January 21 through January 23, 1972. First-seeded Jimmy Connors won the singles title and earned $2,500 first-prize money.

== Finals ==
=== Singles ===
(United States) Jimmy Connors defeated (Czechoslovakia) Vladimír Zedník 6–4, 7–6

- It was Connors' 2nd singles title of the year and of his career.

=== Doubles ===
(United States) Jimmy Connors / (Pakistan) Haroon Rahim defeated (New Zealand) Ian Crookenden / (Czechoslovakia) Vladimír Zedník 6–4, 3–6, 6–3
