= 1982 National Revenue Tennis Classic =

- Date: August 2–8
- Edition: 13th
- Category: Grand Prix
- Draw: 32S / 16D
- Prize money: $100,000
- Surface: Hard / outdoor
- Location: Columbus, Ohio, United States
- Venue: Buckeye Boys Ranch

Champions

Singles
- (United States) Jimmy Connors

Doubles
- (United States) Tim Gullikson / (South Africa) Bernard Mitton
← 1981 ·	Columbus Open	· 1983 →

The 1982 National Revenue Tennis Classic, also known as the Buckeye Championships, was a men's tennis tournament played on outdoor hardcourts at the Buckeye Boys Ranch in Grove City, a suburb of Columbus, Ohio in the United States that was part of the 1982 Volvo Grand Prix circuit. It was the 13th edition of the tournament and was held from August 2 through August 8, 1982. First-seeded Jimmy Connors won the singles title and earned $20,000 first-prize money. It was his third singles title at the event after 1972 and 1973.

== Finals ==
=== Singles ===
(United States) Jimmy Connors defeated (United States) Brian Gottfried 7–5, 6–0

- It was Connors' 6th singles title of the year and the 95th of his career.

=== Doubles ===
(United States) Tim Gullikson / (South Africa) Bernard Mitton defeated (United States) Victor Amaya / (United States) Hank Pfister 4–6, 6–1, 6–4
