= 1972 Buckeye Tennis Championships – Doubles =

Tennis tournament event

Doubles
- 1972 Buckeye Tennis Championships

Final
- Champion: (United States) Jimmy Connors (United States) Pancho Gonzales
- Runner-up: (United States) Robert McKinley (United States) Dick Stockton
- Score: 6–3, 7–5

Details
- Draw: 16

Events
Singles	Doubles
- Columbus Open

The 1972 Buckeye Tennis Championships – Doubles was an event of the 1972 Buckeye Tennis Championships tennis tournament and was played at the Buckeye Boys Ranch in Grove City, Columbus, Ohio in the United States between July 17 and July 23, 1972. Jim Osborne and Jim McManus were the defending champions but were defeated in the semifinal. Jimmy Connors and Pancho Gonzales won the doubles title, defeating Robert McKinley and Dick Stockton in the final, 7–5, 6–3, 7–5.

== Seeds ==
1. (withdrew)
2. (South Africa) Bob Hewitt / (Zimbabwe) Andrew Pattison (semifinals)

== Draw ==
Key

- Q = Qualifier
- WC = Wild card
- LL = Lucky loser
- Alt = Alternate
- ITF = ITF entry
- PR = Protected ranking
- SR = Special ranking
- SE = Special exempt
- JE = Junior exempt
- JR = Junior Accelerator Programme entrant
- CO = College Accelerator Programme entrant
- NG = Next Gen Accelerator Program entrant
- w/o = Walkover
- r = Retired
- d = Defaulted

First Round
(United States) Jim McManus (United States) Jim Osborne	6	6
(United States) Jeff Austin (United States) Dan Birchmore	4	3
(United States) Jim Delaney (United States) Chico Hagey	6	6
(Canada) Peter Burwash (Australia) Ian Fletcher	2	3
(United States) Robert Kreiss (United States) Mike Kreiss	7	7
(France) Jean-Baptiste Chanfreau (France) Wanaro N'Godrella	6	6
(United States) Robert McKinley (United States) Dick Stockton	6	6
(United States) Dick Dell (United States) Butch Seewagen	3	3
(United States) Jimmy Connors (United States) Pancho Gonzales	6	6
(India) Anand Amritraj (India) Vijay Amritraj	4	2
(United States) Zan Guerry (United States) Charles Owens	6	6
(Colombia) Iván Molina (Colombia) Nunil Velasco	4	2
(United States) Mike Estep (New Zealand) Jeff Simpson	6	7
(United States) Paul Gerken (Argentina) Guillermo Vilas	4	5
2	(South Africa) Bob Hewitt (Zimbabwe) Andrew Pattison	6	6
(South Africa) Pat Cramer (United States) Steve Faulk	3	1

Quarterfinals
(United States) Jim McManus (United States) Jim Osborne	7	6
(United States) Jim Delaney (United States) Chico Hagey	6	3
(United States) Robert Kreiss (United States) Mike Kreiss	7	3	0
(United States) Robert McKinley (United States) Dick Stockton	6	6	6
(United States) Jimmy Connors (United States) Pancho Gonzales	6	7
(United States) Zan Guerry (United States) Charles Owens	2	6
(United States) Mike Estep (New Zealand) Jeff Simpson	6	3	3
2	(South Africa) Bob Hewitt (Zimbabwe) Andrew Pattison	4	6	6

Semifinals
(United States) Jim McManus (United States) Jim Osborne	2	2
(United States) Robert McKinley (United States) Dick Stockton	6	6
(United States) Jimmy Connors (United States) Pancho Gonzales	7	6
2	(South Africa) Bob Hewitt (Zimbabwe) Andrew Pattison	5	3

Final
(United States) Robert McKinley (United States) Dick Stockton	3	5
(United States) Jimmy Connors (United States) Pancho Gonzales	6	7
