= 1971 National Indoor Championships – Singles =

Tennis tournament event

Singles
- 1971 National Indoor Championships

Final
- Champion: (Romania) Ilie Năstase
- Runner-up: (United States) Clark Graebner
- Score: 7–5, 6–4, 7–6^{(5–0)}

Details
- Draw: 32

Events
Singles	Doubles
← 1970 ·	Hampton Grand Prix	· 1972 →

The 1971 National Indoor Championships – Singles was an event of the 1971 National Indoor Championships tennis tournament held at the Hampton Roads Coliseum in Hampton, Virginia in the United States from March 1 through March 7, 1971. Stan Smith was the defending champion but did not take part in this edition. First-seeded Ilie Năstase won the singles title, defeating Ilie Năstase 7–5, 6–4, 7–6^{(5–0)} in the final. Năstase had survived five match points during his semifinal match against Željko Franulović.

=== Key ===
- Q = Qualifier
- WC = Wild card
- LL = Lucky loser
- Alt = Alternate
- SE = Special exempt
- PR = Protected ranking
- ITF = ITF entry
- JE = Junior exempt
- w/o = Walkover
- r = Retired
- d = Defaulted
- SR = Special ranking

== Finals ==
Semifinals
(Romania) Ilie Năstase	1	6	6	5	7
(Socialist Federal Republic of Yugoslavia) Željko Franulović	6	0	2	7	5
(United States) Clark Graebner	6	6	7
(Romania) Ion Țiriac	2	2	5

Final
(Romania) Ilie Năstase	7	6	7
(United States) Clark Graebner	5	4	6

== Top half ==
First Round
(Romania) Ilie Năstase	6	6
(United States) Bobby Heald	3	0
(Jamaica) Richard Russell	6	4	6
(Socialist Federal Republic of Yugoslavia) Nikola Špear	2	6	4
(United States) Frank Froehling	4	6	7
(United Kingdom) Peter Curtis	6	0	6
(United States) Tom Gorman	1	7	6
(New Zealand) Ian Crookenden	6	5	4
(Socialist Federal Republic of Yugoslavia) Željko Franulović	6	6
(Australia) Ray Keldie	4	3
(South Africa) Byron Bertram	7	3	7
(West Germany) Ingo Buding	6	6	6
(Brazil) José Edison Mandarino	6	6
(New Zealand) Onny Parun	2	3
(Czechoslovakia) Jan Kodeš	6	6
(Austria) Hans Kary	2	3

Second Round
(Romania) Ilie Năstase	6	6
(Jamaica) Richard Russell	3	2
(United States) Frank Froehling	6	6
(United States) Tom Gorman	1	4
(Socialist Federal Republic of Yugoslavia) Željko Franulović	4	7	6
(South Africa) Byron Bertram	6	5	4
(Brazil) José Edison Mandarino	6	4	1
(Czechoslovakia) Jan Kodeš	4	6	6

Quarterfinals
(Romania) Ilie Năstase	6	6
(United States) Frank Froehling	4	1
(Socialist Federal Republic of Yugoslavia) Željko Franulović	7	3	6
(Czechoslovakia) Jan Kodeš	6	6	3

Semifinals
(Romania) Ilie Năstase	1	6	6
(Socialist Federal Republic of Yugoslavia) Željko Franulović	6	0	2

== Bottom half ==
First Round
(United States) Clark Graebner	6	3
(Australia) Terry Addison	2	0^{r}
(Italy) Martin Mulligan	4	6	6
(Czechoslovakia) Vladimír Zedník	6	0	0
(United States) Tom Edlefsen	6	6
(Hungary) Péter Szőke	1	2
(Chile) Jaime Fillol	6	6
(United States) Frank Parker	3	4
(Brazil) Thomaz Koch	6	7
(Mexico) Joaquín Loyo-Mayo	4	5
(Czechoslovakia) Milan Holeček	6	7
(United States) Jim McManus	4	5
(Romania) Ion Țiriac	6	7
(Canada) Mike Belkin	3	6
(Spain) Manuel Orantes	6	6
(United Kingdom) Gerald Battrick	3	3

Second Round
(United States) Clark Graebner	6	6
(Italy) Martin Mulligan	4	2
(United States) Tom Edlefsen	3	4
(Chile) Jaime Fillol	6	6
(Brazil) Thomaz Koch	6	5	6
(Czechoslovakia) Milan Holeček	1	7	4
(Romania) Ion Țiriac	6	6	6
(Spain) Manuel Orantes	7	0	3

Quarterfinals
(United States) Clark Graebner	5	6	6
(Chile) Jaime Fillol	7	3	1
(Brazil) Thomaz Koch	5	7	1
(Romania) Ion Țiriac	7	6	6

Semifinals
(United States) Clark Graebner	6	6	7
(Romania) Ion Țiriac	2	2	5
