= 1971 National Indoor Championships – Doubles =

Tennis tournament event

Doubles
- 1971 National Indoor Championships

Final
- Champion: (Romania) Ilie Năstase (Romania) Ion Țiriac
- Runner-up: (United States) Clark Graebner (Brazil) Thomaz Koch
- Score: 6–4, 4–6, 7–5

Details
- Draw: 16

Events
Singles	Doubles
← 1970 ·	Hampton Grand Prix	· 1972 →

The 1971 National Indoor Championships – Doubles was an event of the 1971 National Indoor Championships tennis tournament held at the Hampton Roads Coliseum in Hampton, Virginia in the United States from March 1 through March 7, 1971. Ilie Năstase and Ion Țiriac won the doubles title, defeating Clark Graebner and Thomaz Koch 6–4, 4–6, 7–5^{(5–0)} in the final.

== Draw ==
=== Key ===
- Q = Qualifier
- WC = Wild card
- LL = Lucky loser
- Alt = Alternate
- SE = Special exempt
- PR = Protected ranking
- ITF = ITF entry
- JE = Junior exempt
- w/o = Walkover
- r = Retired
- d = Defaulted
- SR = Special ranking

First Round
(Romania) Ilie Năstase (Romania) Ion Țiriac	6	6
(Czechoslovakia) Milan Holeček (Czechoslovakia) Vladimír Zedník	0	2
(Socialist Federal Republic of Yugoslavia) Nikola Špear (Brazil) Luis Felipe Tavares	4	6	6
(Germany) Ingo Buding (Italy) Martin Mulligan	6	2	4
(Socialist Federal Republic of Yugoslavia) Željko Franulović (Czech Republic) Jan Kodeš	6	6
(Mexico) Joaquín Loyo-Mayo (Brazil) José Edison Mandarino	4	1
(Chile) Patricio Cornejo (Chile) Jaime Fillol	7	7
(South Africa) Byron Bertram (New Zealand) Onny Parun	6	5
(Hungary) Szabolcs Baranyi (Hungary) Péter Szőke	6	6
(United States) Tom Gorman (United States) Jim McManus	4	4
(United Kingdom) Gerald Battrick (United Kingdom) Peter Curtis	2	6	6
(New Zealand) Ian Crookenden (United States) Bobby Heald	6	3	3
(Austria) Hans Kary (Spain) Manuel Orantes	6	6
(United States) Frank Froehling (Czech Republic) Jan Kukal	2	2
(United States) Clark Graebner (Brazil) Thomaz Koch	6	7
(Canada) Mike Belkin (United States) Tom Edlefsen	4	6

Quarterfinals
(Romania) Ilie Năstase (Romania) Ion Țiriac	6	7
(Socialist Federal Republic of Yugoslavia) Nikola Špear (Brazil) Luis Felipe Tavares	2	6
(Socialist Federal Republic of Yugoslavia) Željko Franulović (Czech Republic) Jan Kodeš	6	3	4
(Chile) Patricio Cornejo (Chile) Jaime Fillol	1	6	6
(Hungary) Szabolcs Baranyi (Hungary) Péter Szőke	6	4	4
(United Kingdom) Gerald Battrick (United Kingdom) Peter Curtis	1	6	6
(Austria) Hans Kary (Spain) Manuel Orantes	4	3
(United States) Clark Graebner (Brazil) Thomaz Koch	6	6

Semifinals
(Romania) Ilie Năstase (Romania) Ion Țiriac	7	7
(Chile) Patricio Cornejo (Chile) Jaime Fillol	6	5
(United Kingdom) Gerald Battrick (United Kingdom) Peter Curtis	0	5
(United States) Clark Graebner (Brazil) Thomaz Koch	6	7

Final
(Romania) Ilie Năstase (Romania) Ion Țiriac	6	4	7
(United States) Clark Graebner (Brazil) Thomaz Koch	4	6	5
