= 1983 Buckeye Tennis Classic =

- Date: August 1–7
- Edition: 14th
- Category: Grand Prix
- Draw: 32S / 16D
- Prize money: $100,000
- Surface: Hard / outdoor
- Location: Columbus, Ohio, United States
- Venue: Buckeye Boys Ranch

Champions

Singles
- (United States) Brian Teacher

Doubles
- (United States) Scott Davis / (United States) Brian Teacher
← 1982 ·	Columbus Open	· 1984 →

The 1983 Buckeye Tennis Classic, also known as the Columbus Open, was a men's tennis tournament played on outdoor hardcourts at the Buckeye Boys Ranch in Grove City, a suburb of Columbus, Ohio in the United States that was part of the 1983 Volvo Grand Prix circuit. It was the 14th edition of the tournament and was held from August 1 through August 7, 1983. Sixth-seeded Brian Teacher won the singles title, his second at the event after 1981, and earned $20,000 first-prize money.

== Finals ==
=== Singles ===
(United States) Brian Teacher defeated (United States) Bill Scanlon 7–6, 6–4

- It was Teacher's 2nd singles title of the year and the 8th and last of his career.

=== Doubles ===
(United States) Scott Davis / (United States) Brian Teacher defeated (India) Vijay Amritraj / (Australia) John Fitzgerald 6–1, 4–6, 7–6^{(16–14)}
