= 1972 National Indoor Championships – Singles =

Tennis tournament event

Singles
- 1972 National Indoor Championships

Final
- Champion: (United States) Stan Smith
- Runner-up: (Romania) Ilie Năstase
- Score: 6–3, 6–2, 6–7^{(3–5)}, 6–4

Details
- Draw: 32

Events
Singles	Doubles
← 1971 ·	Hampton Grand Prix	· 1973 →

The 1972 National Indoor Championships – Singles was an event of the 1972 National Indoor Championships tennis tournament held at the Hampton Roads Coliseum in Hampton, Virginia in the United States from February 28 through March 5, 1972. Ilie Năstase was the defending champion. Stan Smith won the singles title, defeating Ilie Năstase 6–3, 6–2, 6–7^{(3–5)}, 6–4 in the final.

== Draw ==
=== Key ===
- Q = Qualifier
- WC = Wild card
- LL = Lucky loser
- Alt = Alternate
- SE = Special exempt
- PR = Protected ranking
- ITF = ITF entry
- JE = Junior exempt
- w/o = Walkover
- r = Retired
- d = Defaulted
- SR = Special ranking

=== Finals ===
Semifinals
(United States) Stan Smith	7	6
(Spain) Andrés Gimeno	6	2
(United States) Cliff Richey	6	0	2
(Romania) Ilie Năstase	3	6	6

Final
(United States) Stan Smith	6	6	6	6
(Romania) Ilie Năstase	3	2	7	4

=== Top half ===
First Round
(United States) Stan Smith	7	6
(Hungary) Péter Szőke	5	3
(United States) Tom Gorman	6	3	6
(Romania) Ion Țiriac	3	6	3
(Czech Republic) Vladimír Zedník	6	6
(United Kingdom) David Lloyd	3	1
(Spain) Juan Gisbert Sr.	7	7
(United Kingdom) Gerald Battrick	6	5
(United States) Jimmy Connors	6	6
(Sweden) Ove Bengtson	4	4
(Chile) Jaime Fillol	6	6
(Austria) Hans Kary	0	3
(Australia) Ross Case	5	1
(Brazil) Thomaz Koch	7	6
(Sweden) Tenny Svensson	0	2
(Spain) Andrés Gimeno	6	6

Second Round
(United States) Stan Smith	7	6
(United States) Tom Gorman	5	0
(Czech Republic) Vladimír Zedník	1	3
(Spain) Juan Gisbert Sr.	6	6
(United States) Jimmy Connors	6	6
(Chile) Jaime Fillol	1	2
(Brazil) Thomaz Koch	7	1	5
(Spain) Andrés Gimeno	6	6	7

Quarterfinals
(United States) Stan Smith	4	6	6
(Spain) Juan Gisbert Sr.	6	2	1
(United States) Jimmy Connors	3	6
(Spain) Andrés Gimeno	6	7

Semifinals
(United States) Stan Smith	7	6
(Spain) Andrés Gimeno	6	2

=== Bottom half ===
First Round
(United States) Cliff Richey	6	6
(United States) James Parker	1	2
(Spain) Manuel Orantes	7	7
(Hungary) Szabolcs Baranyi	6	5
(France) Georges Goven	7	7
(Pakistan) Haroon Rahim	6	5
(Australia) Colin Dibley	4	6
(France) Pierre Barthès	6	7
(United States) Clark Graebner	4	2
(United States) Jim McManus	6	6
(New Zealand) Ian Crookenden	7	7
(New Zealand) Onny Parun	5	6
(United States) Tom Edlefsen	2	7	6
(Chile) Patricio Cornejo	6	6	2
(United States) Jim Osborne	4	3
(Romania) Ilie Năstase	6	6

Second Round
(United States) Cliff Richey	6	6
(Spain) Manuel Orantes	4	4
(France) Georges Goven	6	6
(France) Pierre Barthès	3	1
(United States) Jim McManus	6	3	1
(New Zealand) Ian Crookenden	4	6	6
(United States) Tom Edlefsen	2	1
(Romania) Ilie Năstase	6	6

Quarterfinals
(United States) Cliff Richey	7	6
(France) Georges Goven	5	3
(New Zealand) Ian Crookenden	1	3
(Romania) Ilie Năstase	6	6

Semifinals
(United States) Cliff Richey	6	0	2
(Romania) Ilie Năstase	3	6	6
