= Kansas City Open (tennis) =

Defunct tennis tournament
- Event name: Kansas City Open
- Tour: ILTF Circuit (1955-71, 73-76) USLTA Indoor Circuit (1972)
- Founded: 1951
- Abolished: 1979
- Location: Kansas City, Missouri, U.S.
- Surface: Hard (indoors)

The Kansas City Open was a defunct men's and women's tennis tournament founded in 1951. The event was first staged at the Plaza Tennis Center. Kansas City, Missouri, United States. The tournament ran until 1978.

== History ==
The Kansas City Open is a defunct men's and women's tennis tournament founded in 1951. The event was first staged at the Plaza Tennis Center. Kansas City, Missouri, United States and was played on outdoor hard courts until 1971. It then switched to indoor hard courts. The men's event was played on the 1972 USLTA Indoor Circuit for one year in 1972 and was played indoors. Tom Edlefsen won the singles event while Ilie Năstase and Ion Țiriac teamed-up to win the doubles event. The event was held until at least 1978.

== Venues ==
The tournament was originally held at the Plaza Tennis Center a tennis complex that was built in 1928 in Kansas City, Missouri. The venue consisted of 14 outdoor hard courts.

== Finals ==
=== Men's singles ===
(incomplete roll)

Year	Winners	Runners-up	Score
1954	(United States) Hal Surface	(United States) Ronnie Barnes	6–1, 6–3, 6–2.
1955	(United States) Gene Land	(United States) Ed Doane	6–3, 6–3, 6–3.
1959	(United States) Hal Surface	(United States) Gene Land	6–2, 3–6, 6–3.
1960	(United States) Gene Land	(United States) Henry Jungle	6–4, 5–7, 6–3.
1961	(United States) Henry Jungle	(United States) Hal Surface	6–3, 6–4.
1967	(United States) Marty Riessen	(United Kingdom) Peter Curtis	6–2, 6–1, 6–2.
1969	(United States) Ed Doane	(United States) Todd Ballinger	4–6, 6–1, retd.
1970	(United States) Arthur Ashe	(United States) Clark Graebner	6–3, 6–2.
1972	(United States) Tom Edlefsen	(United States) Erik van Dillen	6–3, 6–3
1976	(United States) David Parker	(United States) Kevin Hedberg	6–3, 6–2.

=== Doubles ===
Year	Winners	Runners-up	Score
1972	(Romania) Ilie Năstase (Romania) Ion Țiriac	(Spain) Andrés Gimeno (Spain) Manuel Orantes	6–7, 6–4, 7–6

=== Women's singles ===
(incomplete roll)

Year	Winners	Runners-up	Score
1955	(United States) Connie Cristler	(United States) Helen Ackerman	6–2, 6–3
1960	(United States) Lucille Davidson	(United States) Leonora Prosser	6–2, 6–3
1962	(United States) Lucille Davidson	(United States) Patti Doane	?
1961	(United States) Sally Rielly	(United States) Jean Mills	6–2, 6–3
1970	(United States) Kristy Pigeon	(United States) Denise Carter	6–1, 1–6, 6–1
1977	(United States) Lea Antonoplis	(United States) Sheila McInerney	6–3, 6–2
