= 1980 National Revenue Tennis Classic =

- Date: August 4–10
- Edition: 11th
- Category: Grand Prix
- Draw: 32S / 16D
- Prize money: $75,000
- Surface: Hard / outdoor
- Location: Columbus, Ohio, United States
- Venue: Buckeye Boys Ranch

Champions

Singles
- (United States) Bob Lutz

Doubles
- (United States) Brian Gottfried / (United States) Sandy Mayer
- Columbus Open

The 1980 National Revenue Tennis Classic, also known as the Buckeye Championships, was a men's tennis tournament played on outdoor hardcourts at the Buckeye Boys Ranch in Grove City, a suburb of Columbus, Ohio in the United States that was part of the 1980 Volvo Grand Prix circuit. It was the 11th edition of the tournament and was held from August 4 through August 10, 1980. Seventh-seeded Bob Lutz won the singles title, his second at the event after the inaugural edition in 1970.

== Finals ==
=== Singles ===
(United States) Bob Lutz defeated (Australia) Terry Rocavert 6–4, 6–3

- It was Lutz' 1st singles title of the year and the 9th of his career.

=== Doubles ===
(United States) Brian Gottfried / (United States) Sandy Mayer defeated (United States) Peter Fleming / (United States) Eliot Teltscher 6–4, 6–2
