= 1972 National Indoor Championships – Doubles =

Tennis tournament event

Doubles
- 1972 National Indoor Championships

Final
- Champion: (Romania) Ilie Năstase (Romania) Ion Țiriac
- Runner-up: (Spain) Andrés Gimeno (Spain) Manuel Orantes
- Score: 7–5, 7–5

Details
- Draw: 15

Events
Singles	Doubles
← 1971 ·	Hampton Grand Prix	· 1973 →

The 1972 National Indoor Championships – Doubles was an event of the 1972 National Indoor Championships tennis tournament held at the Hampton Roads Coliseum in Hampton, Virginia in the United States from February 28 through March 5, 1972. Ilie Năstase and Ion Țiriac were the defending champion. They retained their doubles title, defeating Andrés Gimeno and Manuel Orantes 7–5, 7–5 in the final.

== Seeds ==
1. (United States) Jim McManus / (United States) Jim Osborne (quarterfinals)
2. (Australia) Ross Case / (Australia) Colin Dibley (first round)

== Draw ==
=== Key ===
- Q = Qualifier
- WC = Wild card
- LL = Lucky loser
- Alt = Alternate
- SE = Special exempt
- PR = Protected ranking
- ITF = ITF entry
- JE = Junior exempt
- w/o = Walkover
- r = Retired
- d = Defaulted
- SR = Special ranking

First Round
1	(United States) Jim McManus (United States) Jim Osborne	7	7
(France) Pierre Barthès (France) Georges Goven	5	6
(United States) Tom Edlefsen (United States) Cliff Richey	7	3
(United Kingdom) Gerald Battrick (New Zealand) Onny Parun	6	6
(Hungary) Szabolcs Baranyi (Hungary) Péter Szőke	7	6
(Czechoslovakia) Milan Holeček (Brazil) Thomaz Koch	6	2
(Romania) Ilie Năstase (Romania) Ion Țiriac	6	7
(Austria) Hans Kary (United Kingdom) John Lloyd	4	5
BYE
(United States) Jimmy Connors (United States) Tom Gorman
(Sweden) Ove Bengtson (Pakistan) Haroon Rahim	6	6
(Spain) José María Gisbert (Czechoslovakia) Vladimír Zedník	4	3
(Chile) Patricio Cornejo (Chile) Jaime Fillol	6	3	6
(New Zealand) Ian Crookenden (United States) James Parker	1	6	1
(Spain) Andrés Gimeno (Spain) Manuel Orantes	7	3	6
2	(Australia) Ross Case (Australia) Colin Dibley	6	6	1

Quarterfinals
1	(United States) Jim McManus (United States) Jim Osborne	4	1
(United States) Tom Edlefsen (United States) Cliff Richey	6	6
(Hungary) Szabolcs Baranyi (Hungary) Péter Szőke	2	4
(Romania) Ilie Năstase (Romania) Ion Țiriac	6	6
(United States) Jimmy Connors (United States) Tom Gorman	7	7
(Sweden) Ove Bengtson (Pakistan) Haroon Rahim	6	5
(Chile) Patricio Cornejo (Chile) Jaime Fillol	7	6	2
(Spain) Andrés Gimeno (Spain) Manuel Orantes	5	7	6

Semifinals
(United States) Tom Edlefsen (United States) Cliff Richey	5	6	5
(Romania) Ilie Năstase (Romania) Ion Țiriac	7	2	7
(United States) Jimmy Connors (United States) Tom Gorman	4	6
(Spain) Andrés Gimeno (Spain) Manuel Orantes	6	7

Final
(Romania) Ilie Năstase (Romania) Ion Țiriac	7	7
(Spain) Andrés Gimeno (Spain) Manuel Orantes	5	5
