= 1972 U.S. National Indoor Tennis Championships =

- Date: February 13–20
- Edition: 2nd
- Category: USLTA Indoor Circuit; Grand Prix (Grade B)
- Draw: 64S / 32D
- Prize money: $50,000
- Surface: Hard / Indoor
- Location: Salisbury, Maryland, U.S.
- Venue: Wicomico Youth and Civic Center

Champions

Singles
- (United States) Stan Smith

Doubles
- (Spain) Andrés Gimeno / (Spain) Manuel Orantes
- U.S. National Indoor Championships

The 1972 U.S. National Indoor Tennis Championships was a men's tennis tournament held at the Wicomico Youth and Civic Center in Salisbury, Maryland in the United States. The event was part of the 1972 USLTA Indoor Circuit and was also a Grade B event on the 1972 Grand Prix Circuit. It was the second edition of the tournament and was held from February 13 through February 20, 1972, and played on indoor hard courts. First-seeded national Stan Smith won the singles title and $9,000 first-prize money as well as 50 Grand Prix ranking points. It was his second singles title at the event after 1969.

== Finals ==
=== Singles ===
(United States) Stan Smith defeated (Romania) Ilie Năstase 5–7, 6–2, 6–3, 6–4

- It was Smith' 1st singles title of the year and the 37th of his career.

=== Doubles ===
(Spain) Andrés Gimeno / (Spain) Manuel Orantes defeated (Spain) Juan Gisbert Sr. / (Czechoslovakia) Vladimír Zedník 6–4, 6–3

== See also ==
- 1972 National Indoor Championships
- 1972 U.S. Professional Indoor
