= 1979 Fairfield Bay Classic =

- Date: January 29 – February 4
- Edition: 6th
- Category: Grand Prix
- Draw: 32S / 16D
- Prize money: $50,000
- Surface: Hard / indoor
- Location: North Little Rock, AR, US
- Venue: Burns Park

Champions

Singles
- (United States) Vitas Gerulaitis

Doubles
- (United States) Vitas Gerulaitis / (Czechoslovakia) Vladimír Zedník
- Arkansas International Tennis Tournament

The 1979 Fairfield Bay Classic, also known as the Arkansas International, was a men's tennis tournament played on indoor hardcourts at Burns Park in North Little Rock, Arkansas in the United States that was part of the 1979 Grand Prix circuit. It was the sixth and final edition of the event and was held from January 29 through February 4, 1979. First-seeded Vitas Gerulaitis won the singles title and earned $11,500 first-prize money.

== Finals ==
=== Singles ===
(United States) Vitas Gerulaitis defeated (United States) Butch Walts 6–2, 6–2

- It was Gerulaitis' 1st singles title of the year and the 12th of his career.

=== Doubles ===
(United States) Vitas Gerulaitis / (Czechoslovakia) Vladimír Zedník defeated (Australia) Phil Dent / (Australia) Colin Dibley 5–7, 6–3, 7–5
