= Mike Lilly (comics) =

American comic book artist

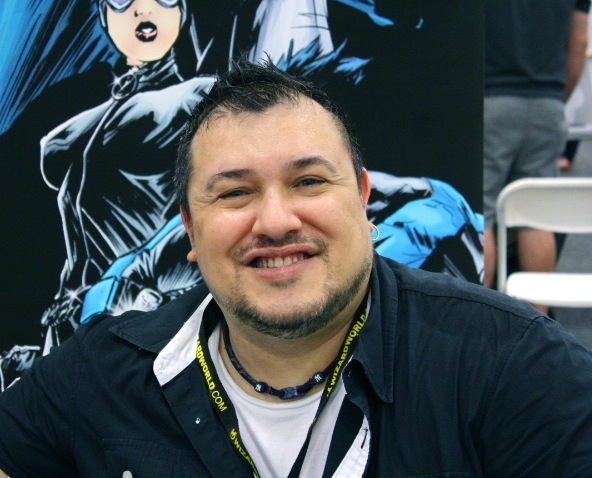
- Mike Lilly at the 2013 Wizard World New York Experience in Manhattan
- Area: Penciller
- Notable works: Annihilation: Conquest Quasar, Vampirella, Nightwing, Detective Comics

Mike Lilly is an American comic book artist known for his work on books such as Annihilation: Conquest, Quasar, Vampirella, Nightwing, Batman, Detective Comics, Marvel Knights, Punisher, Catwoman, Green Lantern, X-Men Unlimited, and Dungeons & Dragons.

== Career ==
In 2005 Lilly and writer Vito Delsante produced the creator owned World War II pulp adventure, The Mercury Chronicles.

He has collaborated with the interior design company Kreiss Enterprises. Lilly designed life size panels to depict an entire comic book story installed onto the walls of designer Loren Kreiss's New York City apartment. This pop-art piece was featured in The New York Times Real Estate section, The Financial Times Style section, Ocean Drive Magazine, Wizard Magazine and The New York Post.

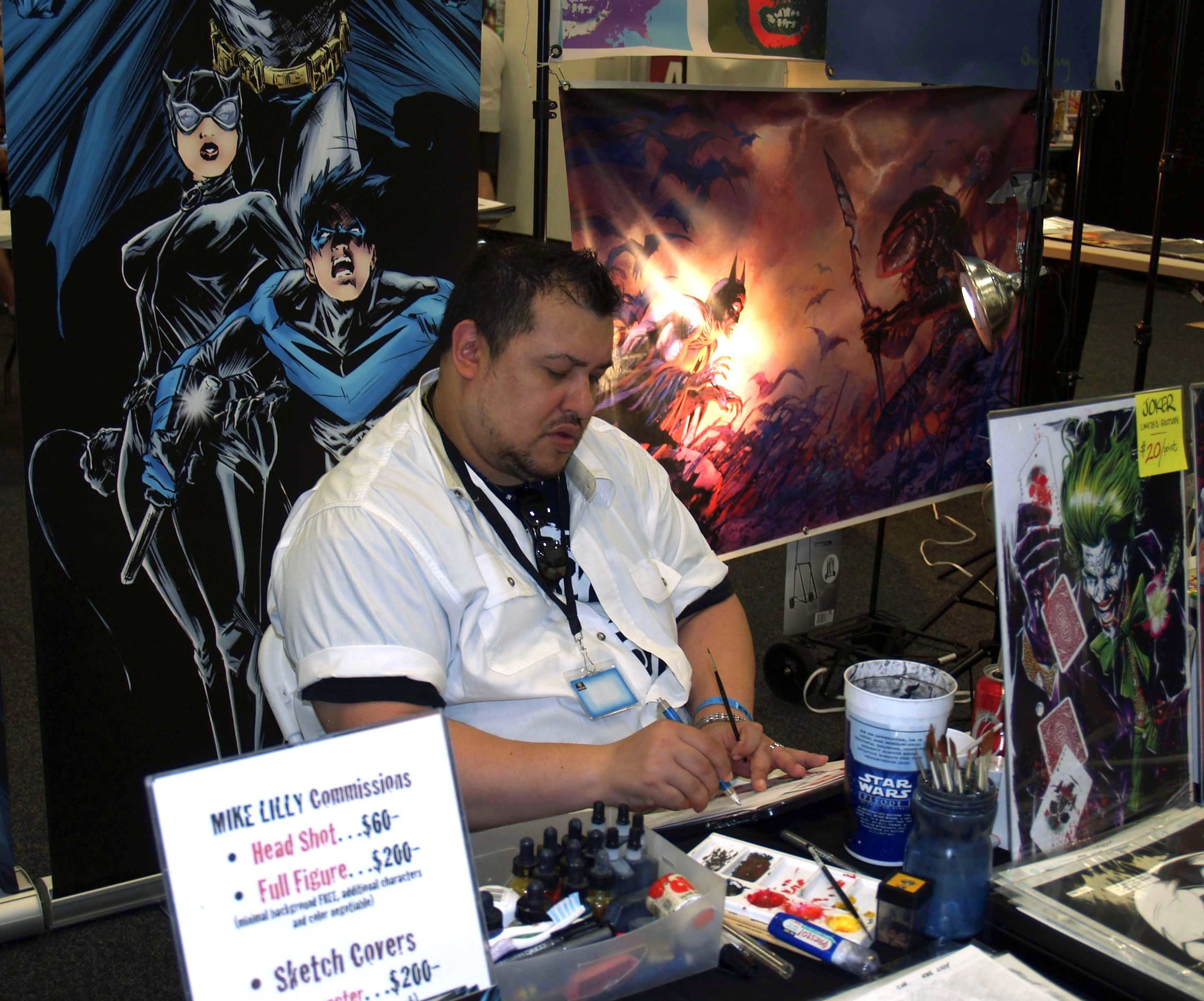
Mike Lilly sketching

Lilly also illustrated Star Wars Heritage original art sketch cards from Topps, Inc. Lilly’s original art sketch cards can also be seen for the Revenge of the Sith trading card line, The Lord of the Rings Evolution and Masterpieces series, Frankenstein from Universal, The Vintage Poster Collection sketch cards from Breygent, The Complete Avengers from Marvel Comics/Rittenhouse Archives and DC Legacy archive editions from DC Comics.

From 2002 to 2005, Lilly worked on a number of Batman-related titles for DC Comics, including Batman Special #1, Detective Comics #788-798 and Nightwing #82, 85 and 94 - 97. From 2005 - 2006, Lilly illustrated the Vampirella Revelations miniseries for Harris Comics.

In 2007 Lilly illustrated the Annihilation: Conquest: Quasar miniseries for Marvel Comics.

In 2008 Lilly signed an exclusive contract with Dynamite Entertainment, for whom he did work on Black Terror.

== Personal life ==
Lilly is based in New York City. He has a son named Robert.
