= 1972 U.S. Clay Court Championships =

- Date: August 7–13
- Edition: 4th
- Category: Grand Prix
- Draw: 64S / 32D
- Surface: Clay / outdoor
- Location: Indianapolis, Indiana, US

Champions

Men's singles
- (South Africa) Bob Hewitt

Women's singles
- (United States) Chris Evert

Men's doubles
- (South Africa) Bob Hewitt / (South Africa) Frew McMillan

Women's doubles
- (Australia) Evonne Goolagong / (Australia) Lesley Hunt
- U.S. Clay Court Championships

The 1972 U.S. Clay Court Championships was a combined men's and women's tennis tournament that was part of the 1972 Grand Prix circuit. The event was held in Indianapolis, Indiana in the United States and played on outdoor clay courts. It was the fourth edition of the tournament in the Open Era and was held in from August 7 through August 13, 1972. Bob Hewitt and Chris Evert won the singles titles.

== Finals ==
=== Men's singles ===
(South Africa) Bob Hewitt defeated (United States) Jimmy Connors 7–6, 6–1, 6–2

=== Women's singles ===
(United States) Chris Evert defeated (Australia) Evonne Goolagong 7–6, 6–1

=== Men's doubles ===
(South Africa) Bob Hewitt / (South Africa) Frew McMillan defeated (Chile) Jaime Fillol / (Chile) Patricio Cornejo 6–2, 6–3

=== Women's doubles ===
(Australia) Evonne Goolagong / (Australia) Lesley Hunt defeated (Australia) Margaret Court / (United States) Pam Teeguarden 6–2, 6–1
