= 1971 Macon International =

- Date: February 23–28
- Edition: 4th
- Category: USLTA Indoor Circuit
- Draw: 42S / 16D
- Prize money: $25,000
- Surface: Carpet / indoor
- Location: Macon, Georgia, U.S.
- Venue: Macon Coliseum

Champions

Singles
- (Socialist Federal Republic of Yugoslavia) Željko Franulović

Doubles
- (United States) Clark Graebner / (Brazil) Thomaz Koch
← 1970 ·	Macon Open	· 1972 →

The 1971 Macon International was a men's tennis tournament played on indoor carpet courts at the Macon Coliseum in Macon, Georgia, in the United States that was part of the 1971 USLTA Indoor Circuit. It was the fourth edition of the event and was held from February 23 through February 28, 1971. Second-seeded foreign player Željko Franulović won the singles title and earned $3,000 first-prize money.

== Finals ==
=== Singles ===
(Socialist Federal Republic of Yugoslavia) Željko Franulović defeated (Romania) Ilie Năstase 6–4, 7–5, 5–7, 3–6, 7–6^{(5–4)}

- It was Franulović' 2nd singles title of the year and the 7th of his career.

=== Doubles ===
(United States) Clark Graebner / (Brazil) Thomaz Koch defeated (Socialist Federal Republic of Yugoslavia) Željko Franulović / (Czechoslovakia) Jan Kodeš 6–3, 7–6
