= 1971 Buckeye Tennis Championships =

- Date: July 26 – August 1
- Edition: 2nd
- Category: Grand Prix (Group D)
- Draw: 32S / 16D
- Prize money: $20,000
- Surface: Hard / outdoor
- Location: Grove City, Columbus, Ohio, United States
- Venue: Buckeye Boys Ranch

Champions

Singles
- (United States) Tom Gorman

Doubles
- (United States) Jim Osborne / (United States) Jim McManus
← 1970 ·	Columbus Open	· 1972 →

The 1971 Buckeye Tennis Championships, als known as the Buckeye Open, was a men's tennis tournament played on outdoor hard courts at the Buckeye Boys Ranch in Grove City, Columbus, Ohio in the United States that was part of Group D of the 1971 Grand Prix circuit. It was the second edition of the tournament and was held from July 26 through August 1, 1971. Second-seeded Tom Gorman won the singles title and earned $5,000 first-prize money as well as 15 ranking points.

== Finals ==
=== Singles ===
(United States) Tom Gorman defeated (United States) Jimmy Connors 6–7, 7–6, 4–6, 7–6^{(5–2)}, 6–3

- It was Gorman's first singles title of his career.

=== Doubles ===
(United States) Jim Osborne / (United States) Jim McManus defeated (United States) Jimmy Connors / (United States) Roscoe Tanner 4–6, 7–5, 6–2
