= 1972 National Indoor Championships =

- Date: February 28 – March 5
- Edition: 3rd
- Category: Grand Prix (Group C); USLTA Indoor circuit
- Draw: 32S / 15D
- Prize money: $35,000
- Surface: Carpet / indoor
- Location: Hampton, Virginia, United States
- Venue: Hampton Roads Coliseum

Champions

Singles
- (United States) Stan Smith

Doubles
- (Romania) Ilie Năstase / (Romania) Ion Țiriac
- Hampton Grand Prix

The 1972 National Indoor Championships, also known as the Hampton Indoor, was a men's tennis tournament played on indoor carpet courts at the Hampton Roads Coliseum in Hampton, Virginia in the United States that was part of Group C of the 1972 Grand Prix circuit as well as of the 1972 USLTA Indoor Circuit. It was the third edition of the tournament and was held from February 28 through March 5, 1972. First-seeded Stan Smith won the singles title and earned $9,000 first-prize money.

== Finals ==
=== Singles ===
(United States) Stan Smith defeated (Romania) Ilie Năstase 6–3, 6–2, 6–7^{(3–5)}, 6–4

- It was Smith' 3rd singles title of the year and the 39th of his career.

=== Doubles ===
(Romania) Ilie Năstase / (Romania) Ion Țiriac defeated (Spain) Andrés Gimeno / (Spain) Manuel Orantes 7–5, 7–5

== See also ==
- 1972 U.S. National Indoor Tennis Championships
- 1972 U.S. Professional Indoor
