= 1973 Buckeye Tennis Championships =

- Date: July 30 – August 5
- Edition: 4th
- Category: Grand Prix (Group C)
- Draw: 32S / 16D
- Prize money: $25,000
- Surface: Hard / outdoor
- Location: Grove City, Columbus, Ohio, United States
- Venue: Buckeye Boys Ranch

Champions

Singles
- (United States) Jimmy Connors

Doubles
- (United Kingdom) Gerald Battrick / (United Kingdom) Graham Stilwell
- Columbus Open

The 1973 Buckeye Tennis Championships was a men's tennis tournament played on outdoor hard courts at the Buckeye Boys Ranch in Grove City, Columbus, Ohio in the United States that was part of Group C of the 1973 Grand Prix circuit. It was the fourth edition of the tournament and was held from July 30 through August 5, 1973. First-seeded Jimmy Connors won his second consecutive singles title at the event and earned $5,000 first-prize money.

== Finals ==
=== Singles ===
(United States) Jimmy Connors defeated (United States) Charlie Pasarell 3–6, 6–3, 6–3

- It was Connors' 8th singles title of the year and 14th of his career.

=== Doubles ===
(United Kingdom) Gerald Battrick / (United Kingdom) Graham Stilwell defeated (Australia) Colin Dibley / (United States) Charlie Pasarell 6–4, 7–6
