= Yitshak Kreiss =

Israeli physician

- יצחק קרייס
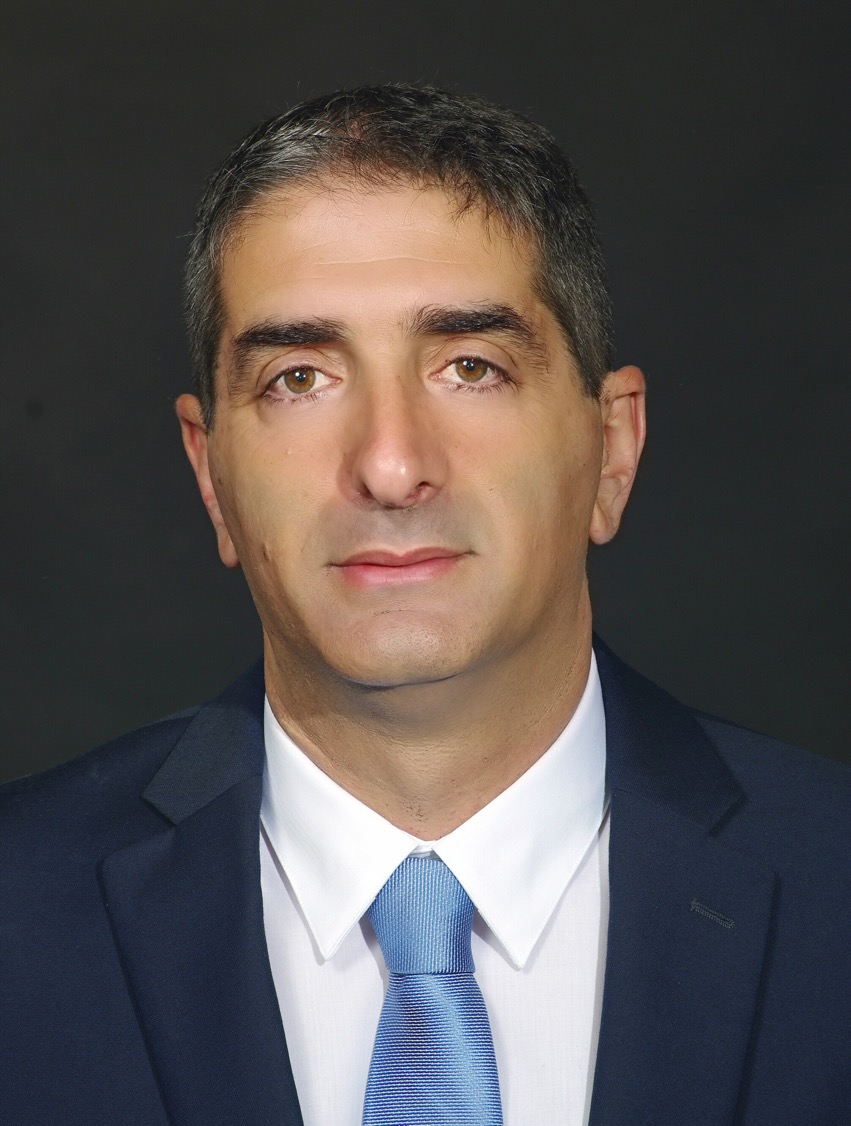
- Yitshak Kreiss
- Born: 1965 (age 60–61); Ramat Gan, Israel
- Citizenship: Israeli
- Education: Hebrew University of Jerusalem, Tel Aviv University; Harvard University

Yitshak Kreiss (Hebrew: יצחק קרייס; born 1965) is an Israeli physician and Director General of Sheba Medical Center in Tel Hashomer. Kreiss served in the Israel Defense Forces in various capacities for 25 years, achieving the rank of Brigadier General. In 2011, he was appointed Surgeon General of the IDF. Kreiss is an expert in disaster medical relief.

== Biography ==
Yitshak Kreiss was born in Ramat Gan.

In 1983, he enrolled in the Atuda program of the Israel Defense Forces and began to study medicine at the Hebrew University of Jerusalem. He did his residency in internal medicine at Sheba Medical Center. He was also earned an MHA in health administration from Tel Aviv University (2005) and an MPH in public administration from Harvard University (2007).

Kreiss is married to Inbal, senior manager for Israel Aerospace Industries who is involved in Arrow missile development. They have three children. The family lives in Shoham.

== Military career ==
Upon completing his studies, Kreiss served as a medical officer with the Paratroopers Brigade. In 1991–1994, he was attached to Unit 101. Over the years, he moved up the ranks, from a front-line combat surgeon to all levels of command. In October 2011, he assumed the post of IDF Surgeon General.

Kreiss established an IDF combat casualty care plan called "My Brother's Keeper" successfully put into practice during Operation Protective Edge. In 2019, he co-edited a comprehensive manual for setting up field hospitals which was published by Cambridge University.

== Academic career ==
Kreiss is an associate professor of medicine at Tel Aviv University and adjunct associate clinical professor at the Hebrew University School of Medicine. He is one of the heads of the MBA healthcare innovation program of the Herzliya Interdisciplinary Center and serves as a visiting professor in the Faculty of Business Administration of Florida Atlantic University.

== Medical career ==
Kreiss is an expert in disaster relief and management of field hospitals. In 1999 he led a medical unit in the IDF delegation to Macedonia to provide medical aid to Albanian refugees from Kosovo. In 2004, he headed the medical team sent to Egypt to aid victims of the Sinai terror attack. In 2010, he oversaw the establishment of a field hospital in Haiti to treat earthquake victims. As Chief Medical Officer, he led the campaign to provide humanitarian medical care for victims of the Syrian civil war. As a result, thousands of wounded Syrians have been treated in Israeli hospitals since February 2013. In November 2013, he oversaw the Israeli relief mission dispatched to the Philippines to aid casualties of Typhoon Haiyan.

On 15 August 2016, Kreiss was appointed director of Sheba Medical Center at Tel Hashomer.

In 2018, Kreiss signed the "City of Health" agreement, making Sheba Medical Center the recipient of the largest development budget ever awarded to a public hospital in Israel. The funds are earmarked for the creation of an innovative approach to healthcare capable of meeting the challenges of the future.

From the earliest days of the COVID-19 pandemic, Kreiss was at the forefront of the Israel's emergency response, with Sheba Medical Center opening the first coronavirus ward in the country. Under Kreiss's direction, a new intensive care unit with hundreds of beds was inaugurated to serve Israel in times of national emergencies.

=== Awards and recognition ===
In 2013, Kreiss was the recipient of the Dr. Jean Mayer Global Citizenship Award, granted in appreciation of his humanitarian relief efforts in times of war and peace. In 2014, he was invited by TEDMED to deliver a lecture on leadership response to crisis.

In 2018, Kreiss was ranked fifth in TheMarker's annual listing of the 100 most influential people in Israel. In 2019, the Jerusalem Post listed him as one of the 50th most important Jews in the world

== Published works ==
- Elhanan Bar-On, Kobi Peleg, Yitshak Kreiss, Field Hospitals – A Comprehensive Guide to Preparation and Operation, Cambridge University Press, January 2020, ISBN 110714132X
