= Mike Kreiss =

American furniture designer and professional tennis player (1951–2012)

- Full name: Michael Lawrence Kreiss
- Country (sports): United States
- Born: December 22, 1951
- Died: March 5, 2012 (aged 60)

Singles
- Career record: 3–20
- Highest ranking: No. 136 (March 2, 1974)

Grand Slam singles results
- US Open: 1R (1971, 1972)

Doubles
- Career record: 3–12

Michael Lawrence Kreiss (December 22, 1951 – March 5, 2012) was an American furniture designer and professional tennis player. He served as an executive of the family company Kreiss, a luxury furniture manufacturer.

Kreiss, the eldest son of Kreiss company founder Norman Kreiss, played collegiate tennis while at UCLA and featured twice in the main draw of the US Open. His middle brother Robert was a junior Wimbledon champion and youngest brother Thomas, former husband of Lisa Bonder, was also a professional player.

A furniture designer, Kreiss founded Kreiss Design in 1976, which sits within the family business.

Kreiss died in 2012 and the company is now headed by his son Loren.
