= Kreiss =

- Industry: home furnishings, interior design
- Founded: 1939
- Headquarters: Los Angeles, California, United States
- Key people: Murray Kreiss, founder Loren Kreiss, CEO & creative director
- Website: https://www.kreiss.com/

Kreiss is an American luxury furniture manufacturer, retailer and interior design firm based in Los Angeles. Kreiss is known for pioneering The California look.

== History ==
Kreiss was founded in 1939 by Murray Kreiss and his two sons Norman and Howard. The company began by importing ceramics from Japan. Norman, along with his wife Eileen, expanded the company's importing portfolio to include goods sourced from Spain, Hong Kong, China and Thailand in the early 1960s.

In 1966, Kreiss opened its first showroom in West Hollywood. In 1972, Kreiss started its first in-house manufacturing operations in Southern California and developed a furniture collection that later became known internationally as The California Look. In 1976, Kreiss Design was founded by Michael Kreiss, the eldest son of Norman and Eileen and this expanded the company's services to include interior design.

In the early 1990s, Kreiss started offering its products all over the United States. By the early 2000s, the brand had more than 24 locations across North America. The company briefly ceased operations in 2013 after the deaths of Norman and Michael the previous year.

In 2014, the brand was purchased and relaunched by Michael's eldest son Loren Kreiss, who had previously served as the company's President and Lead Product Designer. Loren is presently the company's CEO & Creative Director.

Kreiss produces all of its furniture in North America with its primary source a factory located in San Diego. Over the years, the company has attracted a number of clients including international celebrities like Paul McCartney, Ronald Reagan, Frank Sinatra, Bruce Springsteen, Janet Jackson, Magic Johnson, Michael Jordan and many others.
