= 1971 National Indoor Championships =

- Date: March 1–7
- Edition: 2nd
- Category: USLTA Indoor circuit
- Draw: 32S / 16D
- Prize money: $35,000
- Surface: Carpet / indoor
- Location: Hampton, Virginia, United States
- Venue: Hampton Roads Coliseum

Champions

Singles
- (United States) Stan Smith

Doubles
- (Romania) Ilie Năstase / (Romania) Ion Țiriac
- Hampton Grand Prix

The 1971 National Indoor Championships, also known as the Hampton Indoor, was a men's tennis tournament played on indoor carpet courts at the Hampton Roads Coliseum in Hampton, Virginia in the United States that was part of the 1971 USLTA Indoor Circuit. It was the second edition of the tournament and was held from March 1 through March 7, 1971. First-seeded Ilie Năstase won the singles title and earned $10,000 first-prize money.

== Finals ==
=== Singles ===
(Romania) Ilie Năstase defeated (United States) Clark Graebner 7–5, 6–4, 7–6^{(5–0)}

- It was Năstase's 3rd singles title of the year and the 7th of his career.

=== Doubles ===
(Romania) Ilie Năstase / (Romania) Ion Țiriac defeated (United States) Clark Graebner / (Brazil) Thomaz Koch 6–4, 4–6, 7–5

== See also ==
- 1971 U.S. National Indoor Tennis Championships
- 1971 U.S. Professional Indoor
