= Wicomico Youth and Civic Center =

Multi-purpose arena in Salisbury, Maryland

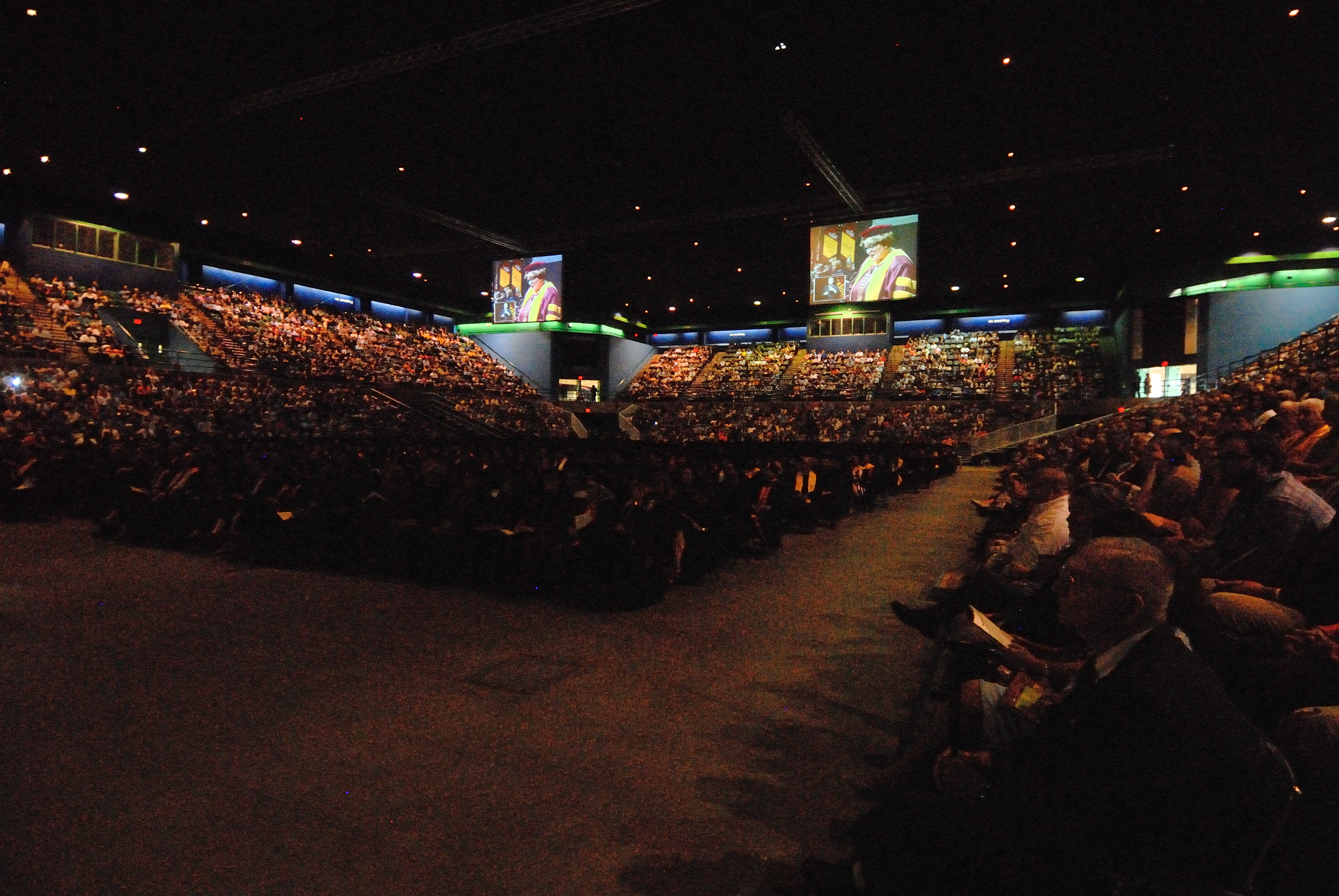
- A 2016 Salisbury University commencement ceremony inside the Wicomico Youth and Civic Center
- Interactive map of Wicomico Youth and Civic Center
- Address: 500 Glen Avenue; Salisbury, Maryland
- Coordinates: 38.360983°N 75.575702°W
- Owner: Wicomico County, Maryland
- Capacity: 6,000

Construction
- Built: 1980
- Renovated: 2017
- Cost: $7.4 million (2008-2013 renovations)

Website
- www.wicomicociviccenter.org

Wicomico Youth and Civic Center is a multi-purpose arena located in Salisbury, Maryland. The main arena contains 30,000 square feet (2,800 m^{2}) of space while the secondary arena contains 10,000 square feet (930 m^{2}). The main arena can seat 2,500 for banquets, 3,000 for theater concerts and stage shows, 5,000-6,000 for concerts and similar events. It features a 42-foot (13 m)-high ceiling. The arena opened in 1980 and replaced an auditorium which had opened in 1950 and had burned down in 1977.

Attached to the arena are ten meeting rooms totaling 9,348 square feet (868 m^{2}) of space.

Until 2016, the Civic Center had a real covenant against serving alcohol.

== Renovations ==
Renovations have occurred between 2007 and 2017. These renovations have included the upgrading of the lighting and energy systems, repairs to the block wall at the arena, folding chair replacement, stage curtain replacement, restoration of the arena lobby, the arena roof rehabilitation, repainting of one of the meeting rooms and hallways, upgrades to the sound system including rehanging of the arena speakers, a new scoreboard system, replacement of escalators, new ceiling tiles, door replacement, and new stage risers.
