= Loren B. Kreiss =

American Interior designer and artist

Loren Kreiss
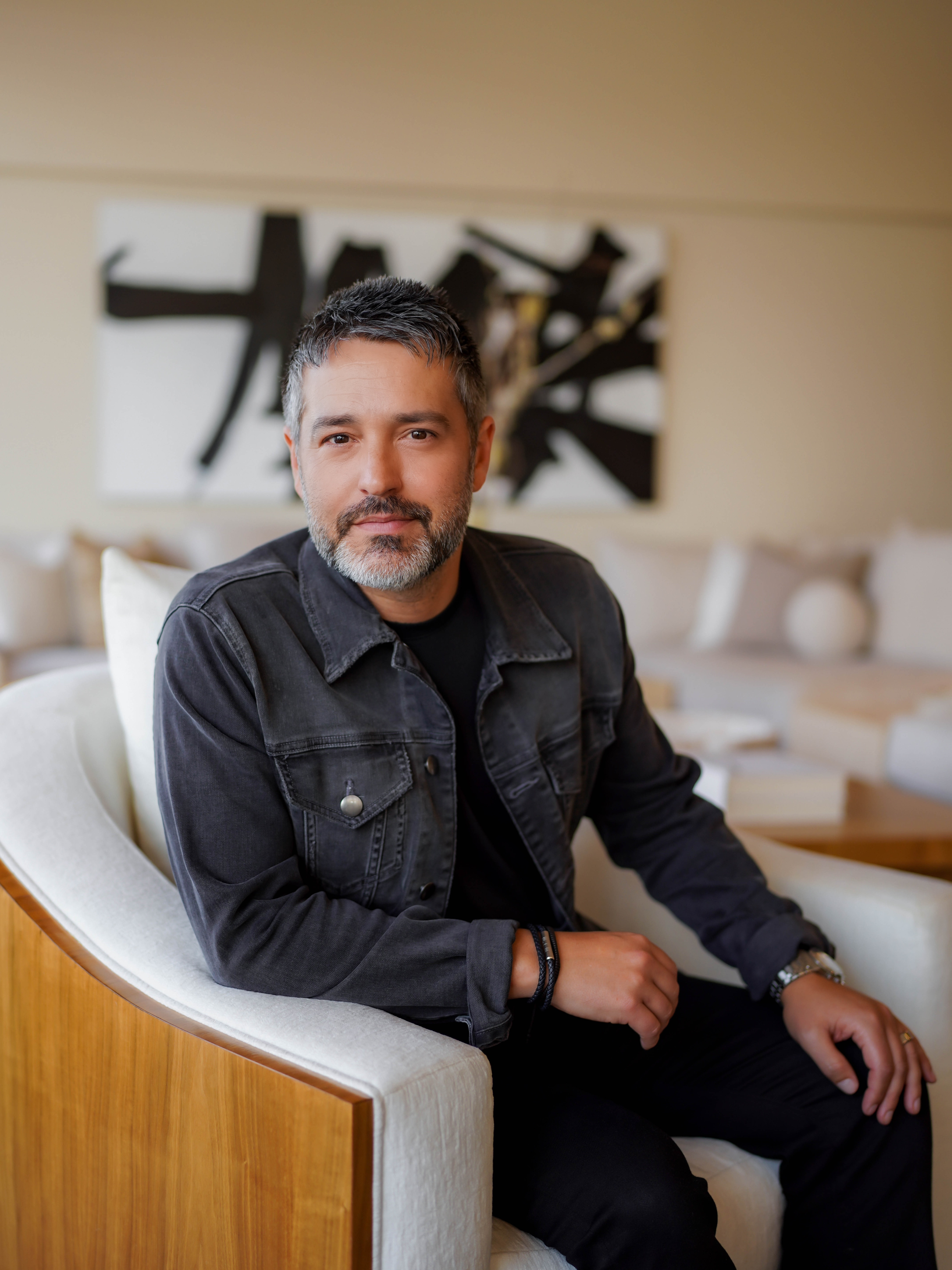
- Born: 12 February 1981 (age 45); Los Angeles, California, US
- Education: University of California at Los Angeles
- Occupations: Interior designer, Commentator & Critic
- Known for: CEO & creative director of Kreiss

Loren Kreiss (born February 12, 1981) is an American Interior designer, commentator & critic. He is the CEO & creative director of Kreiss, an American furniture brand. He has a significant presence on social media where he shares viral design advice that is often quirky and acerbic.

== Life and career ==
As a teenager, Loren started a punk music zine and record label entitled Lurid. After high school, he entered University of California at Los Angeles. At 21, he began his career with his family's business Kreiss in the company's Miami, Florida location. In 2006, he moved to New York City where he was the director of East Coast Operations. In 2009, he became the company's president and lead product designer.

After the deaths of his grandfather and father in 2011 and 2012, the company briefly ceased operations. In 2014, Loren acquired and relaunched the brand in Los Angeles. He opened the company's current flagship showroom in West Hollywood in 2016.

In the ensuing years, Kreiss has gained a following of interior designers and celebrities having designed the homes of Matthew McConaughey, DJ Khaled, Floyd Mayweather Jr., Magic Johnson, Nicki Minaj, Metro Boomin and others. In August 2021, Loren made international headlines when he acquired Pamela Anderson's Malibu Colony home.

Loren began his art career in 2005 when he created the first of a series of custom art installations entitled The Artifact and the Manipulated Living in conjunction with former Batman illustrator Mike Lilly. He also created a second art project titled Ash in collaboration with Japanese illustrator, Aya Kakeda.

In 2007, Loren ventured into photography with Hey Mister, a 15 panel photographic installation completed for the New York Foundling charitable organization. He earned The Heart of Gold award from the New York Foundling Hospital for his artistic contributions to charity.

Loren also created another art project titled Say Hello to my Little Friends in 2007. He later showcased his artworks at a solo gallery show at AFP Galleries in New York City in 2009.
