= Vladimír Zedník =

Czech tennis player (born 1947)

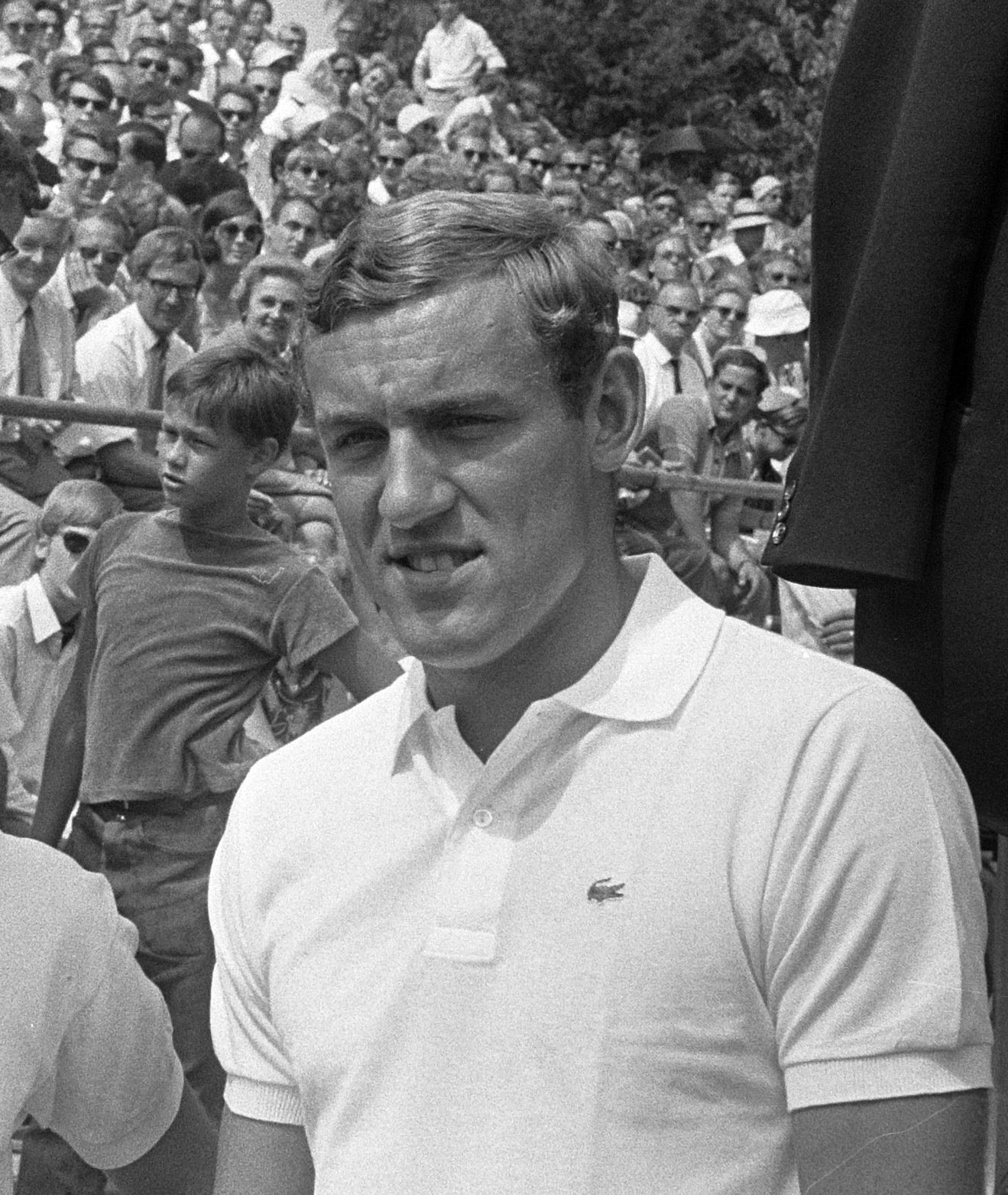
- Vladimír Zedník in 1969
- Country (sports): Czechoslovakia
- Born: 1 February 1947 (age 79) Prague, Czechoslovakia

Singles
- Career record: 100–140
- Career titles: 2
- Highest ranking: No. 35 (26 June 1978)

Grand Slam singles results
- Australian Open: QF (1974)
- French Open: 3R (1970)
- Wimbledon: 3R (1973)
- US Open: 2R (1973, 1974)

Doubles
- Career record: 83–111
- Career titles: 4
- Highest ranking: No. 109 (2 January 1978)

Team competitions
- Davis Cup: F (1975)

Vladimír Zedník (born 1 February 1947) is a Czech former professional tennis player who represented Czechoslovakia. In 1975, he was a member of the Czechoslovak team which lost 3–2 in the final of the Davis Cup to the Swedish team led by Björn Borg. During his career Zedník won two singles and four doubles titles.

== Career finals ==
=== Singles (2 titles, 3 runner-ups) ===
Result	W–L	Date	Tournament	Surface	Opponent	Score
Loss	0–1	Apr 1971	Des Moines, U.S.	Carpet	(United States) Cliff Richey	1–6, 3–6
Loss	0–2	Jan 1972	Roanoke, U.S.	Carpet	(United States) Jimmy Connors	4–6, 6–7
Win	1–2	Feb 1972	Cleveland, U.S.	Hard	(Pakistan) Haroon Rahim	7–6, 6–7, 4–6, 6–2, 6–3
Win	2–2	Jun 1978	Berlin, West Germany	Clay	(West Germany) Harald Elschenbroich	6–4, 7–5, 6–2
Loss	2–3	Jul 1978	Kitzbühel, Austria	Clay	(Australia) Chris Lewis	1–6, 4–6, 0–6

=== Doubles (4 titles, 4 runner-ups) ===
Result	W–L	Date	Tournament	Surface	Partner	Opponents	Score
Loss	0–1	Jan 1972	Roanoke, U. S.	Carpet	(New Zealand) Ian Crookenden	(United States) Jimmy Connors (Pakistan) Haroon Rahim	4–6, 6–3, 3–6
Loss	0–2	Feb 1972	Salisbury, U.S.	Hard (i)	(Spain) Juan Gisbert Sr.	(Spain) Andrés Gimeno (Spain) Manuel Orantes	4–6, 3–6
Win	1–2	Sep 1973	Los Angeles, U.S.	Hard	(Czechoslovakia) Jan Kodeš	(United States) Jimmy Connors (Romania) Ilie Năstase	6–2, 6–4
Win	2–2	Oct 1973	Prague, Czechoslovakia	Clay	(Czechoslovakia) Jan Kodeš	(Hungary) Róbert Machán (Hungary) Balázs Taróczy	7–6, 7–6
Win	3–2	Mar 1974	Palm Desert WCT, U.S.	Hard	(Czechoslovakia) Jan Kodeš	(South Africa) Raymond Moore (New Zealand) Onny Parun	6–4, 6–4
Loss	3–3	Jun 1977	Berlin, West Germany	Clay	(Czechoslovakia) Pavel Huťka	(Chile) Hans Gildemeister (Chile) Belus Prajoux	not played, shared
Loss	3–4	Jun 1978	Brussels, Belgium	Clay	(New Zealand) Onny Parun	(France) Jean-Louis Haillet (Italy) Antonio Zugarelli	3–6, 6–4, 5–7
Win	4–4	Feb 1979	Arkansas, U.S.	Hard (i)	(United States) Vitas Gerulaitis	(Australia) Phil Dent (Australia) Colin Dibley	5–7, 6–3, 7–5
