= Tom Edlefsen =

American tennis player

- Full name: Thomas B. Edlefsen
- Country (sports): United States
- Born: December 12, 1941 (age 84) Piedmont, California, U.S.
- Height: 6 ft 2 in (1.88 m)
- Plays: Right-handed

Singles
- Career record: 51–93
- Career titles: 1
- Highest ranking: No. 94 (June 3, 1974)

Grand Slam singles results
- French Open: 1R (1968, 1969, 1973)
- Wimbledon: 4R (1968)
- US Open: 3R (1962, 1965)

Doubles
- Career record: 69–75
- Career titles: 1

Thomas B. Edlefsen (born December 12, 1941) is a former professional tennis player from the United States.

== Career ==
Edlefsen was a member of three NCAA Championship winning teams while at the University of Southern California, in 1963, 1964 and 1966. He was a three time All-American.

He won the U.S. National Hardcourt doubles titles in 1963 and 1965.

At the U.S. National Indoors in 1964, Edlefsen had wins over both Arthur Ashe and Roy Emerson.

In 1967, he developed a nerve disease, Guillain–Barré syndrome, after suffering a reaction to a smallpox vaccination he had while with the Air Force Reserves. He was left with total paralysis.

He recovered after six months in hospital and returned to tennis, notably making the fourth round at the 1968 Wimbledon Championships, along the way defeating 14th seed Cliff Drysdale. Raymond Moore defeated him in the fourth round over five sets.

In 1972, Edlefsen won a singles title at the Kansas City Open and a doubles title at the Washington Indoor tournament.

== Grand Prix/WCT career finals ==
=== Singles: 1 (1–0) ===
| Result | W/L | Date | Tournament | Surface | Opponent | Score |
|---|---|---|---|---|---|---|
| Win | 1–0 | Feb 1972 | Kansas City, United States | Carpet | (United States) Erik van Dillen | 6–3, 6–3 |

=== Doubles: 3 (1–2) ===
| Result | W/L | Date | Tournament | Surface | Partner | Opponents | Score |
|---|---|---|---|---|---|---|---|
| Win | 1–0 | Mar 1972 | Washington D.C., United States | Carpet | (United States) Cliff Richey | (United States) Clark Graebner (Brazil) Thomaz Koch | 6–4, 6–3 |
| Loss | 1–1 | Mar 1974 | Barcelona, Spain | Carpet | (United States) Tom Leonard | (United States) Arthur Ashe (United States) Roscoe Tanner | 3–6, 4–6 |
| Loss | 1–2 | Apr 1974 | Tucson, United States | Hard | (Spain) Manuel Orantes | (United States) Charlie Pasarell (United States) Sherwood Stewart | 4–6, 4–6 |
