= Columbus Open =

Tennis tournament in Ohio, U.S.

Defunct tennis tournament
- Event name: Columbus Open
- Tour: Grand Prix circuit
- Founded: 1970
- Abolished: 1984
- Editions: 15
- Surface: Clay (1971–1979); Hard (1980–1984)

The Columbus Open, also known as the Buckeye Tennis Championships or Buckeye Open, is a defunct affiliated men's tennis tournament played from 1970 to 1984 in Columbus, Ohio, in the United States. The inaugural edition in 1970 was an invitational tournament with eight top independent professional players. It was played on synthetic hard court at the newly created 3,200-seat stadium at the Buckeye Boys Ranch in Grove City, a suburb of Columbus. From 1971 until 1984 the tournament was part of the Grand Prix circuit. The tournament was played on outdoor clay courts from 1971 to 1979, and then played on outdoor hard courts from 1980 to 1984.

Brian Teacher was the most successful player at the tournament, winning the singles competition twice and the doubles competition three times with three different partners; once with American William Brown, once with American Bruce Manson and once with American Scott Davis.

== Finals ==
=== Singles ===
Year	Champions	Runners-up	Score
1970	(United States) Bob Lutz	(United States) Tom Gorman	7–5, 1–6, 6–4, 6–2
1971	(United States) Tom Gorman	(United States) Jimmy Connors	6–7, 7–6, 4–6, 7–6, 6–3
1972	(United States) Jimmy Connors	(Rhodesia) Andrew Pattison	7–5, 6–3, 7–5
1973	(United States) Jimmy Connors	(United States) Charlie Pasarell	3–6, 6–3, 6–3
1974	(Mexico) Raúl Ramírez	(United States) Roscoe Tanner	3–6, 7–6, 6–4
1975	(India) Vijay Amritraj	(United States) Bob Lutz	6–4, 7–5
1976	(United States) Roscoe Tanner	(United States) Stan Smith	6–4, 7–6
1977	(Argentina) Guillermo Vilas	(United States) Brian Gottfried	6–2, 6–1
1978	(United States) Arthur Ashe	(United States) Robert Lutz	6–3, 6–4
1979	(United States) Brian Gottfried	(United States) Eddie Dibbs	6–3, 6–0
1980	(United States) Bob Lutz	(Australia) Terry Rocavert	6–4, 6–3
1981	(United States) Brian Teacher	(United States) John Austin	6–3, 6–2
1982	(United States) Jimmy Connors	(United States) Brian Gottfried	7–5, 6–0
1983	(United States) Brian Teacher	(United States) Bill Scanlon	7–6, 6–4
1984	(United States) Brad Gilbert	(United States) Hank Pfister	6–3, 3–6, 6–3

=== Doubles ===
Year	Champions	Runners-up	Score
1970	(United States) Bob Lutz (United States) Stan Smith	(United States) Tom Gorman (Australia) Ray Ruffels	6–2, 8–6
1971	(United States) Jim McManus (United States) Jim Osborne	(United States) Jimmy Connors (United States) Roscoe Tanner	6–7, 6–4, 6–2
1972	(United States) Jimmy Connors (United States) Pancho Gonzales	(United States) Robert McKinley (United States) Dick Stockton	6–3, 7–5
1973	(United Kingdom) Gerald Battrick (United Kingdom) Graham Stilwell	(Australia) Colin Dibley (United States) Charlie Pasarell	6–4, 7–6
1974	(India) Anand Amritraj (India) Vijay Amritraj	(United States) Tom Gorman (United States) Bob Lutz	W/O
1975	(United States) Bob Lutz (United States) Stan Smith	(West Germany) Jürgen Fassbender (West Germany) Hans-Jürgen Pohmann	6–2, 6–7, 6–3
1976	(United States) William Brown (United States) Brian Teacher	(United States) Fred McNair (United States) Sherwood Stewart	6–4, 6–3
1977	(United States) Bob Lutz (United States) Stan Smith	(United States) Peter Fleming (United States) Gene Mayer	4–6, 7–5, 6–2
1978	(Australia) Colin Dibley (Australia) Bob Giltinan	(Mexico) Marcello Lara (United States) Eliot Teltscher	6–2, 6–3
1979	(United States) Brian Gottfried (United States) Bob Lutz	(United States) Tim Gullikson (United States) Tom Gullikson	4–6, 6–3, 7–6^{(7–1)}
1980	(United States) Brian Gottfried (United States) Sandy Mayer	(United States) Peter Fleming (United States) Eliot Teltscher	6–4, 6–2
1981	(United States) Bruce Manson (United States) Brian Teacher	(India) Anand Amritraj (India) Vijay Amritraj	6–1, 6–1
1982	(United States) Tim Gullikson (South Africa) Bernard Mitton	(United States) Victor Amaya (United States) Hank Pfister	4–6, 6–1, 6–4
1983	(United States) Scott Davis (United States) Brian Teacher	(India) Vijay Amritraj (Australia) John Fitzgerald	6–1, 4–6, 7–6
1984	(United States) Sandy Mayer (United States) Stan Smith	(United States) Charles Bud Cox (United States) Terry Moor	6–4, 6–7, 7–5

== See also ==
- Virginia Slims of Columbus – women's tournament
- Columbus Challenger – men's challenger tournament
