= 1975 USLTA-IPA Indoor Circuit =

Details
- Duration: 13 January – 10 March
- Edition: 5th
- Tournaments: 13

Achievements (singles)
- Most titles: (United States) Jimmy Connors (5)
- Most finals: (United States) Jimmy Connors (6)

The 1975 USLTA-IPA Indoor Circuit was a professional tennis circuit held in the United States from January until April that year. It was the fifth edition of the circuit and consisted of 13 tournaments. Tennis promotor Bill Riordan organized the circuit and it was sanctioned by the United States Lawn Tennis Association (USLTA). The circuit had a bonus pool of $100,000 for the top eight players.

== Schedule ==
=== January ===
Week of	Tournament	Champion	Runner-up	Semifinalists	Quarterfinalists
13 Jan	Bahamas International; Freeport, Bahamas; Hard – $50,000 – 32S	(United States) Jimmy Connors; 6–0, 6–2	(West Germany) Karl Meiler	(United States) Trey Waltke (Spain) Juan Gisbert Sr.	(West Germany) Jürgen Fassbender (United States) Clark Graebner (United States) Sandy Mayer (United States) Gene Mayer
13 Jan	Baltimore International; Baltimore, United States; Carpet (i) – $30,000 – 16S/8D	(United States) Brian Gottfried; 3–6, 6–2, 6–3	(Australia) Allan Stone	(United States) Bob Lutz (Australia) Tony Roche	(United States) Erik van Dillen (United States) Paul Gerken (Australia) Ray Ruffels (United States) Steve Krulevitz
13 Jan	Baltimore International; Baltimore, United States; Carpet (i) – $30,000 – 16S/8D	(Australia) Dick Crealy (Australia) Ray Ruffels; 6–4, 6–3	(Egypt) Ismail El Shafei (South Africa) Frew McMillan	(United States) Bob Lutz (Australia) Tony Roche	(United States) Erik van Dillen (United States) Paul Gerken (Australia) Ray Ruffels (United States) Steve Krulevitz
20 Jan	Birmingham International; Birmingham, United States; Carpet (i) – $25,000 – 32S/16D	(United States) Jimmy Connors; 6–4, 6–3	(United States) Billy Martin	(West Germany) Karl Meiler (West Germany) Jürgen Fassbender	(United States) Jeff Austin (United Kingdom) Roger Taylor (United Kingdom) John Feaver (Spain) Juan Gisbert Sr.
20 Jan	Birmingham International; Birmingham, United States; Carpet (i) – $25,000 – 32S/16D	(West Germany) Karl Meiler (West Germany) Jürgen Fassbender; 6–1, 3–6, 7–6	(Rhodesia) Colin Dowdeswell (South Africa) John Yuill	(West Germany) Karl Meiler (West Germany) Jürgen Fassbender	(United States) Jeff Austin (United Kingdom) Roger Taylor (United Kingdom) John Feaver (Spain) Juan Gisbert Sr.
27 Jan	Roanoke International; Roanoke, United States; Carpet (i) – $25,000 – 32S/16D	(United Kingdom) Roger Taylor; 7–6, 7–6	(United States) Vitas Gerulaitis	(West Germany) Karl Meiler (West Germany) Jürgen Fassbender	(United States) Clark Graebner (United States) Charles Owens (United States) Sandy Mayer (Australia) Ian Fletcher
27 Jan	Roanoke International; Roanoke, United States; Carpet (i) – $25,000 – 32S/16D	(United States) Vitas Gerulaitis (United States) Sandy Mayer; 7–6, 1–6, 6–3	(Spain) Juan Gisbert Sr. (Romania) Ion Țiriac	(West Germany) Karl Meiler (West Germany) Jürgen Fassbender	(United States) Clark Graebner (United States) Charles Owens (United States) Sandy Mayer (Australia) Ian Fletcher
27 Jan	Dayton Pro Tennis Classic; Dayton, United States; Carpet (i) – $30,000 – 16S/8D	(United States) Brian Gottfried; 6–4, 4–6, 6–4	(Australia) Geoff Masters	(Soviet Union) Teimuraz Kakulia (United States) Erik Van Dillen	(Australia) Phil Dent (Australia) Allan Stone (Australia) John Alexander (United States) Harold Solomon
27 Jan	Dayton Pro Tennis Classic; Dayton, United States; Carpet (i) – $30,000 – 16S/8D	(Australia) Ray Ruffels (Australia) Allan Stone; 7–6, 7–6	(United States) Paul Gerken (United States) Brian Gottfried	(Soviet Union) Teimuraz Kakulia (United States) Erik Van Dillen	(Australia) Phil Dent (Australia) Allan Stone (Australia) John Alexander (United States) Harold Solomon

=== February ===
Week of	Tournament	Champion	Runner-up	Semifinalists	Quarterfinalists
2 Feb	Arkansas International; Little Rock, United States; Hard (i) – $25,000 – 32S/16D	(United States) Billy Martin; 6–2, 7–6	(United States) George Hardie	(United Kingdom) Roger Taylor (West Germany) Karl Meiler	(Poland) Wojtek Fibak (Spain) Juan Gisbert Sr. (United States) John Holladay (United States) Dick Bohrnstedt
2 Feb	Arkansas International; Little Rock, United States; Hard (i) – $25,000 – 32S/16D	(Mexico) Marcello Lara (Australia) Barry Phillips-Moore; 6–4, 6–3	(United States) Jeff Austin (United States) Charles Owens	(United Kingdom) Roger Taylor (West Germany) Karl Meiler	(Poland) Wojtek Fibak (Spain) Juan Gisbert Sr. (United States) John Holladay (United States) Dick Bohrnstedt
10 Feb	U.S. Indoor Championships; Salisbury, Maryland, U.S. Carpet (i) – $50,000 – 53S/24D	(United States) Jimmy Connors; 5–7, 7–5, 6–1, 3–6, 6–0	(United States) Vitas Gerulaitis	(United States) Sandy Mayer (Romania) Ilie Năstase	(Soviet Union) Teimuraz Kakulia (Czechoslovakia) Jan Kodeš (United Kingdom) Roger Taylor (United States) Billy Martin
10 Feb	U.S. Indoor Championships; Salisbury, Maryland, U.S. Carpet (i) – $50,000 – 53S/24D	(United States) Jimmy Connors (Romania) Ilie Năstase; 7–6, 6–2	(Czechoslovakia) Jan Kodeš (United Kingdom) Roger Taylor	(United States) Sandy Mayer (Romania) Ilie Năstase	(Soviet Union) Teimuraz Kakulia (Czechoslovakia) Jan Kodeš (United Kingdom) Roger Taylor (United States) Billy Martin
17 Feb	Boca West International; Boca Raton, United States; Clay	(United States) Jimmy Connors; 6–4, 6–2	(West Germany) Jürgen Fassbender	(West Germany) Karl Meiler (United States) Charles Owens	(Poland) Wojciech Fibak (Czechoslovakia) Jan Písecký (United States) Jeff Austin (Canada) Mike Belkin
17 Feb	Boca West International; Boca Raton, United States; Clay	(United States) Clark Graebner (Spain) Juan Gisbert; 6–2, 6–1	(West Germany) Jürgen Fassbender (Romania) Ion Țiriac	(West Germany) Karl Meiler (United States) Charles Owens	(Poland) Wojciech Fibak (Czechoslovakia) Jan Písecký (United States) Jeff Austin (Canada) Mike Belkin
24 Feb	Fairfield County International; Ridgefield, United States; Carpet (i)	(United Kingdom) Roger Taylor; 7–5, 5–7, 7–6	(United States) Sandy Mayer	(Zimbabwe) Roger Dowdeswell (United States) Peter Fleming	(Spain) Juan Gisbert (Czechoslovakia) Jan Písecký (Czechoslovakia) Jan Kodeš (Romania) Ion Țiriac
24 Feb	Fairfield County International; Ridgefield, United States; Carpet (i)	(Spain) Juan Gisbert (United States) Clark Graebner; 6–4, 6–4	(United States) Sandy Mayer (Romania) Ion Țiriac	(Zimbabwe) Roger Dowdeswell (United States) Peter Fleming	(Spain) Juan Gisbert (Czechoslovakia) Jan Písecký (Czechoslovakia) Jan Kodeš (Romania) Ion Țiriac

=== March ===
Week of	Tournament	Champion	Runner-up	Semifinalists	Quarterfinalists
3 Mar	Shreveport International; Shreveport, Louisiana, U.S. Carpet (i) – $15,000 – 16S/8D	(Spain) Juan Gisbert; 6–3, 5–7, 6–1	(Poland) Wojciech Fibak	(Hungary) Róbert Machán (United States) Bill Brown	
3 Mar	Shreveport International; Shreveport, Louisiana, U.S. Carpet (i) – $15,000 – 16S/8D	(United States) Bill Brown (Spain) Juan Gisbert; 6–4, 6–4	(Hungary) Róbert Machán (Hungary) János Benyik	(Hungary) Róbert Machán (United States) Bill Brown	
10 Mar	Coliseum Mall International; Hampton, Virginia, U.S. Carpet (i) – $37,500 – 32S/16D; Singles – Doubles	(United States) Jimmy Connors; 3–6, 6–3, 6–0	(Czechoslovakia) Jan Kodeš	(Poland) Wojciech Fibak (Spain) Juan Gisbert	(United States) Jeff Austin (United States) Robert Kreiss (West Germany) Karl Meiler (United States) Clark Graebner
10 Mar	Coliseum Mall International; Hampton, Virginia, U.S. Carpet (i) – $37,500 – 32S/16D; Singles – Doubles	(New Zealand) Ian Crookenden (New Zealand) Ian Fletcher; 6–2, 6–7^{(3–5)}, 6–4	(West Germany) Karl Meiler (Czechoslovakia) Jan Písecký	(Poland) Wojciech Fibak (Spain) Juan Gisbert	(United States) Jeff Austin (United States) Robert Kreiss (West Germany) Karl Meiler (United States) Clark Graebner
17 Mar	IPA Tennis Championships; New York, U.S.	(United States) Vitas Gerulaitis walkover	(United States) Jimmy Connors	(United Kingdom) Roger Taylor (Czechoslovakia) Jan Kodeš	(United States) Billy Martin (United Kingdom) John Feaver (Czechoslovakia) Jan Písecký (United States) Sandy Mayer
26 Mar	Tennis South Invitational; Jackson, Mississippi, U.S. Carpet (i) – $35,000	(Australia) Ken Rosewall; 7–5, 4–6, 7–6^{(7–3)}	(United States) Butch Buchholz	(Australia) Fred Stolle (Australia) John Newcombe	(United Kingdom) John Feaver (Australia) Bob Carmichael (United Kingdom) Roger Taylor (Romania) Ion Țiriac

== See also ==
- 1975 Grand Prix circuit
- 1975 World Championship Tennis circuit
