= 1975 Coliseum Mall International – Doubles =

Tennis tournament event

Doubles
- 1975 Coliseum Mall International

Final
- Champion: (New Zealand) Ian Crookenden (Australia) Ian Fletcher
- Runner-up: (West Germany) Karl Meiler (Czechoslovakia) Jan Písecký
- Score: 6–2, 6–7^{(3–5)}, 6–4

Details
- Draw: 16
- Seeds: 4

Events
Singles	Doubles
← 1974 ·	Hampton Grand Prix	· 1976 →

The 1975 Coliseum Mall International – Doubles was an event of the 1975 Coliseum Mall International men's tennis tournament that was played at the Hampton Roads Coliseum in Hampton, Virginia in the United States from March 10 through March 16, 1975. The draw comprised 16 teams of which four were seeded. Željko Franulović and Nikola Pilić were the defending doubles champions but did not compete in this edition. Unseeded Ian Crookenden and Ian Fletcher won the doubles title, defeating unseeded Karl Meiler and Jan Písecký in the final, 6–2, 6–7^{(3–5)}, 6–4.

== Seeds ==
1. (Czechoslovakia) Jan Kodeš / (United Kingdom) Roger Taylor (semifinals)
2. (Spain) Juan Gisbert Sr. / (United States) Clark Graebner (first round)
3. (United States) Jeff Austin / (United States) Charles Owens (quarterfinals)
4. (Rhodesia) Roger Dowdeswell / (South Africa) John Yuill (quarterfinals)

== Draw ==
=== Key ===
- Q = Qualifier
- WC = Wild card
- LL = Lucky loser
- Alt = Alternate
- SE = Special exempt
- PR = Protected ranking
- ITF = ITF entry
- JE = Junior exempt
- w/o = Walkover
- r = Retired
- d = Defaulted
- SR = Special ranking

First Round
1	(Czechoslovakia) Jan Kodeš (United Kingdom) Roger Taylor	6	6
(United States) Woody Blocher (United States) Trey Waltke	1	1
(United States) Dick R. Bohrnstedt (Socialist Federal Republic of Yugoslavia)	6	6	1
(Australia) Ernie Ewert (Australia) Chris Kachel	4	7	6
(United States) Robert Kreiss (Romania) Viorel Marcu
(West Germany) Karl Meiler (Czechoslovakia) Jan Písecký	w/o
(United States) Bruce Foxworth (Brazil) Roger Guedes	5	4
3	(United States) Jeff Austin (United States) Charles Owens	7	6
4	(Rhodesia) Roger Dowdeswell (South Africa) John Yuill	5	6	6
(Hungary) János Benyik (Hungary) Róbert Machán	7	4	3
(Poland) Wojciech Fibak (Netherlands) Rolf Thung	6	6
(United Kingdom) John Feaver (Japan) Jun Kuki	2	2
(New Zealand) Ian Crookenden (Australia) Ian Fletcher	w/o
(United States) Gene Mayer (United States) Nick Saviano
(United States) William Brown (United States) John Holladay	6	7
2	(Spain) Juan Gisbert Sr. (United States) Clark Graebner	4	6

Quarterfinals
1	(Czechoslovakia) Jan Kodeš (United Kingdom) Roger Taylor	6	6
(Australia) Ernie Ewert (Australia) Chris Kachel	1	2
(West Germany) Karl Meiler (Czechoslovakia) Jan Písecký	1	7	6
3	(United States) Jeff Austin (United States) Charles Owens	6	6	3
4	(Rhodesia) Roger Dowdeswell (South Africa) John Yuill	6	4
(Poland) Wojciech Fibak (Netherlands) Rolf Thung	7	6
(New Zealand) Ian Crookenden (Australia) Ian Fletcher	6	7
(United States) William Brown (United States) John Holladay	3	6

Semifinals
1	(Czechoslovakia) Jan Kodeš (United Kingdom) Roger Taylor	6	3	6
(West Germany) Karl Meiler (Czechoslovakia) Jan Písecký	4	6	7
(Poland) Wojciech Fibak (Netherlands) Rolf Thung	2	4
(New Zealand) Ian Crookenden (Australia) Ian Fletcher	6	6

Final
(West Germany) Karl Meiler (Czechoslovakia) Jan Písecký	2	7	4
(New Zealand) Ian Crookenden (Australia) Ian Fletcher	6	6	6
