= 1975 Coliseum Mall International – Singles =

Tennis tournament event

Singles
- 1975 Coliseum Mall International

Final
- Champion: (United States) Jimmy Connors
- Runner-up: (Czechoslovakia) Jan Kodeš

Details
- Draw: 32
- Seeds: 4

Events
| Singles | Doubles |
| ← 1974 · | Hampton Grand Prix | · 1976 → |

The 1975 Coliseum Mall International – Singles was an event of the 1975 Coliseum Mall International men's tennis tournament that was played at the Hampton Roads Coliseum in Hampton, Virginia in the United States from March 10 through March 16, 1975. The draw comprised 32 players and four of them were seeded. First-seeded Jimmy Connors was the defending singles champion and he successfully defended his title, defeating second-seeded Jan Kodeš in the final, 3–6, 6–3, 6–0.

== Seeds ==
1. (United States) Jimmy Connors (champion)
2. (Czechoslovakia) Jan Kodeš (final)
3. (United Kingdom) Roger Taylor (second round)
4. (West Germany) Karl Meiler (quarterfinals)

== Draw ==
=== Key ===
- Q = Qualifier
- WC = Wild card
- LL = Lucky loser
- Alt = Alternate
- SE = Special exempt
- PR = Protected ranking
- ITF = ITF entry
- JE = Junior exempt
- w/o = Walkover
- r = Retired
- d = Defaulted
- SR = Special ranking

=== Finals ===
Semifinals
1 | (United States) Jimmy Connors | 1 | 6 | 6
(Poland) Wojciech Fibak | 6 | 3 | 3
(Spain) Juan Gisbert Sr. | 6 | 0
2 | (Czechoslovakia) Jan Kodeš | 7 | 6

Final
1 | (United States) Jimmy Connors | 3 | 6 | 6
2 | (Czechoslovakia) Jan Kodeš | 6 | 3 | 0

=== Top half ===
First Round
1 | (United States) Jimmy Connors | 6 | 6
(United States) Bill Shivar | 0 | 2
(Zimbabwe) Roger Dowdeswell | 1 | 4
(United States) Charles Owens | 6 | 6
(United States) Jeff Austin | 6 | 6
(Romania) Viorel Marcu | 1 | 1
(Australia) Chris Kachel | 6 | 2
(United States) John Holladay | 0 | 1^{r}
(Japan) Jun Kuki | 6 | 4 | 2
(United States) Robert Kreiss | 0 | 6 | 6
(Czechoslovakia) Jan Písecký | 6 | 3 | 6
(Netherlands) Rolf Thung | 2 | 6 | 1
(Poland) Wojciech Fibak | 6 | 6
(United States) William Brown | 1 | 4
(United States) Woody Blocher | 6 | 1 | 2
3 | (United Kingdom) Roger Taylor | 4 | 6 | 6

Second Round
1 | (United States) Jimmy Connors | 6 | 6
(United States) Charles Owens | 4 | 0
(United States) Jeff Austin | 6 | 7
(Australia) Chris Kachel | 2 | 5
(United States) Robert Kreiss | 6 | 7
(Czechoslovakia) Jan Písecký | 3 | 6
(Poland) Wojciech Fibak | 2 | 6 | 6
3 | (United Kingdom) Roger Taylor | 6 | 4 | 3

Quarterfinals
1 | (United States) Jimmy Connors | 6 | 6
(United States) Jeff Austin | 2 | 3
(United States) Robert Kreiss | 1 | 4
(Poland) Wojciech Fibak | 6 | 6

Semifinals
1 | (United States) Jimmy Connors | 1 | 6 | 6
(Poland) Wojciech Fibak | 6 | 3 | 3

=== Bottom half ===
First Round
4 | (West Germany) Karl Meiler | 6 | 6
(South Africa) John Yuill | 1 | 0
(Hungary) Róbert Machán | 6 | 6 | 6
(United Kingdom) John Feaver | 7 | 4 | 3
(United States) Dick R. Bohrnstedt | 1 | 6 | 6
(Australia) Ian Fletcher | 6 | 3 | 3
(United States) Gene Mayer | 4 | 1
(Spain) Juan Gisbert Sr. | 6 | 6
(United States) Clark Graebner | 6 | 7
(Brazil) Roger Guedes | 2 | 6
(United States) Nick Saviano | 6 | 3 | 4
(New Zealand) Ian Crookenden | 4 | 6 | 6
(Australia) Ernie Ewert | 3 | 4
(United States) Trey Waltke | 6 | 6
(Hungary) János Benyik | 4 | 2
2 | (Czechoslovakia) Jan Kodeš | 6 | 6

Second Round
4 | (West Germany) Karl Meiler | 6 | 6
(Hungary) Róbert Machán | 2 | 4
(United States) Dick R. Bohrnstedt | 4 | 6
(Spain) Juan Gisbert Sr. | 6 | 7
(United States) Clark Graebner | 6 | 7
(New Zealand) Ian Crookenden | 4 | 6
(United States) Trey Waltke | 6 | 4 | 0
2 | (Czechoslovakia) Jan Kodeš | 4 | 6 | 6

Quarterfinals
4 | (West Germany) Karl Meiler | 3 | 2
(Spain) Juan Gisbert Sr. | 6 | 6
(United States) Clark Graebner | 3 | 3
2 | (Czechoslovakia) Jan Kodeš | 6 | 6

Semifinals
(Spain) Juan Gisbert Sr. | 6 | 0
2 | Jan Kodeš | 7 | 6
