= 1975 Coliseum Mall International =

- Date: March 10–16
- Edition: 6th
- Category: USLTA-IPA Indoor circuit
- Draw: 32S / 16D
- Prize money: $37,500
- Surface: Carpet / indoor
- Location: Hampton, Virginia, United States
- Venue: Hampton Roads Coliseum

Champions

Singles
- (United States) Jimmy Connors

Doubles
- (New Zealand) Ian Crookenden / (Australia) Ian Fletcher
- Hampton Grand Prix

The 1975 Coliseum Mall International, also known as the Hampton Indoor, was a men's tennis tournament played on indoor carpet courts at the Hampton Roads Coliseum in Hampton, Virginia in the United States that was part of the 1975 USLTA-IPA Indoor Circuit. It was the sixth edition of the tournament and was held from March 10 through March 16, 1975. First-seeded player Jimmy Connors won his third consecutive singles title and earned $10,000 first-prize money.

== Finals ==
=== Singles ===
(United States) Jimmy Connors defeated (Czechoslovakia) Jan Kodeš 3–6, 6–3, 6–0

- It was Connors' 5th singles title of the year and the 37th of his career.

=== Doubles ===
(New Zealand) Ian Crookenden / (Australia) Ian Fletcher defeated (West Germany) Karl Meiler / (Czechoslovakia) Jan Písecký 6–2, 6–7^{(3–5)}, 6–4
