= 1975 US Open – Men's doubles =

Men's doubles
- 1975 US Open

Final
- Champion: (United States) Jimmy Connors (Romania) Ilie Năstase
- Runner-up: (Netherlands) Tom Okker (United States) Marty Riessen
- Score: 6–4, 7–6

Details
- Draw: 64
- Seeds: 8

Events
Singles	men	women		boys	girls
Doubles	men	women	mixed	boys	girls
WC Singles	men	women	quad
WC Doubles	men	women	quad
Legends	men	women	mixed
← 1974 ·	US Open	· 1976 →

Bob Lutz and Stan Smith were the defending champions but withdrew from the tournament. Jimmy Connors and Ilie Năstase won in the final 6–4, 7–6 against Tom Okker and Marty Riessen.

== Seeds ==
1. (United States) Brian Gottfried / (Mexico) Raúl Ramírez (third round)
2. (Spain) Juan Gisbert / (Spain) Manuel Orantes (third round)
3. (United States) Bob Lutz / (United States) Stan Smith (withdrew)
4. (West Germany) Jürgen Fassbender / (West Germany) Hans-Jürgen Pohmann (third round)
5. n.a.
6. (South Africa) Bob Hewitt / (South Africa) Frew McMillan (first round)
7. (United States) Jimmy Connors / (Romania) Ilie Năstase (champions)
8. (United States) Vitas Gerulaitis / (United States) Sandy Mayer (first round)

== Draw ==
=== Key ===
- Q = Qualifier
- WC = Wild card
- LL = Lucky loser
- Alt = Alternate
- ITF = ITF entry
- PR = Protected ranking
- SR = Special ranking
- SE = Special exempt
- JE = Junior exempt
- JR = Junior Accelerator Programme entrant
- CO = College Accelerator Programme entrant
- NG = Next Gen Accelerator Program entrant
- w/o = Walkover
- r = Retired
- d = Defaulted

=== Finals ===
Quarterfinals
(Argentina) Ricardo Cano (Chile) Belus Prajoux	2	2
(Netherlands) Tom Okker (United States) Marty Riessen	6	6
(Romania) Ion Țiriac (Argentina) Guillermo Vilas	1	6	6
(United States) Fred McNair (United States) Sherwood Stewart	6	3	7
7	(United States) Jimmy Connors (Romania) Ilie Năstase	6	6
(United States) Armistead Neely (Sweden) Tenny Svensson	2	2
(Australia) Phil Dent (Australia) William Lloyd	4	7	2
(United States) Dick Stockton (United States) Erik van Dillen	6	6	6

Semifinals
(Netherlands) Tom Okker (United States) Marty Riessen	7	7
(United States) Fred McNair (United States) Sherwood Stewart	5	5
7	(United States) Jimmy Connors (Romania) Ilie Năstase	6	6
(United States) Dick Stockton (United States) Erik van Dillen	4	4

Final
(Netherlands) Tom Okker (United States) Marty Riessen	4	6
7	(United States) Jimmy Connors (Romania) Ilie Năstase	6	7

=== Top half ===
==== Section 1 ====
First round
1	(United States) B Gottfried (Mexico) R Ramírez	6	6
(United States) B Buchholz (United States) C McKinley	2	2
(India) A Amritraj (India) V Amritraj	6	6
(United States) S Krulevitz (United States) H Schoenfield	1	4
(Argentina) R Cano (Chile) B Prajoux	6	6	7
(United States) J Andrews (United States) M Estep	3	7	6
(South Africa) B Bertram (United States) P Gerken	6	6
(Australia) C Dibley (South Africa) R Moore	3	4
6	(South Africa) B Hewitt (South Africa) F McMillan	3	6
(United States) C Pasarell (United States) R Tanner	6	7
(United States) M Cahill (United States) J Whitlinger	6	6
(India) S Menon (United States) R Reid	3	2
(Netherlands) T Okker (United States) M Riessen	w/o
(Japan) J Kamiwazumi (Japan) J Kuki
(Spain) J Higueras (Spain) A Muñoz	5	6	6
(South Africa) B Mitton (South Africa) D Schneider	7	4	2

Second round
1	(United States) B Gottfried (Mexico) R Ramírez	6	6
(India) A Amritraj (India) V Amritraj	4	3
(Argentina) R Cano (Chile) B Prajoux	6	6
(South Africa) B Bertram (United States) P Gerken	3	4
(United States) C Pasarell (United States) R Tanner	3	6
(United States) M Cahill (United States) J Whitlinger	6	7
(Netherlands) T Okker (United States) M Riessen	6	6
(Spain) J Higueras (Spain) A Muñoz	0	2

Third round
1	(United States) B Gottfried (Mexico) R Ramírez	3	6
(Argentina) R Cano (Chile) B Prajoux	6	7
(United States) M Cahill (United States) J Whitlinger	1	4
(Netherlands) T Okker (United States) M Riessen	6	6

Quarterfinals
(Argentina) R Cano (Chile) B Prajoux	2	2
(Netherlands) T Okker (United States) M Riessen	6	6

==== Section 2 ====
First round
4	(West Germany) J Fassbender (West Germany) H-J Pohmann	6	6
(United States) B Manson (United States) F Taygan	3	4
(United States) L Gottfried (United States) J McEnroe	w/o
(United States) J Fort (United States) K McMillan
(Romania) I Țiriac (Argentina) G Vilas	6	7
(Bolivia) R Benavides (Colombia) J Velasco	4	6
(Australia) D Crealy (United Kingdom) J Lloyd	6	6
(Australia) B Phillips-Moore (United States) E Scott	3	4
8	(United States) V Gerulaitis (United States) S Mayer	1	6
(Australia) S Ball (Australia) K Warwick	6	7
(United States) J Borowiak (Denmark) T Ulrich	6	6
(Australia) R Case (Australia) G Masters	2	4
(United Kingdom) G Battrick (United Kingdom) G Stilwell	6	2	4
(United States) F McNair (United States) S Stewart	4	6	6
(Poland) W Fibak (Czechoslovakia) J Kodeš	6	6
(Soviet Union) A Metreveli (United Kingdom) R Taylor	1	2

Second round
4	(West Germany) J Fassbender (West Germany) H-J Pohmann	7	7
(United States) L Gottfried (United States) J McEnroe	5	6
(Romania) I Țiriac (Argentina) G Vilas	2	6	7
(Australia) D Crealy (United Kingdom) J Lloyd	6	3	5
(Australia) S Ball (Australia) K Warwick	4	6	6
(United States) J Borowiak (Denmark) T Ulrich	6	4	3
(United States) F McNair (United States) S Stewart	w/o
(Poland) W Fibak (Czechoslovakia) J Kodeš

Third round
4	(West Germany) J Fassbender (West Germany) H-J Pohmann	2	4
(Romania) I Țiriac (Argentina) G Vilas	6	6
(Australia) S Ball (Australia) K Warwick	7	4	6
(United States) F McNair (United States) S Stewart	6	6	7

Quarterfinals
(Romania) I Țiriac (Argentina) G Vilas	1	6	6
(United States) F McNair (United States) S Stewart	6	3	7

=== Bottom half ===
==== Section 3 ====
First round
(United States) G Mayer (United States) T Waltke	6	6	4
(United States) D Dell (United States) B Martin	7	4	6
(Chile) P Cornejo (Chile) J Fillol	2	7	6
(Czechoslovakia) M Holeček (West Germany) K Meiler	6	5	3
(Australia) B Carmichael (New Zealand) O Parun	6	7
(United States) J Austin (United States) P Rennert	3	5
(Australia) J James (Netherlands) R Thung	2	5
7	(United States) J Connors (Romania) I Năstase	6	7
(Chile) Á Fillol (United States) D Kanter	2	6	3
(United States) A Neely (Sweden) T Svensson	6	3	6
(Rhodesia) C Dowdeswell (Rhodesia) R Dowdeswell	2	4
(United Kingdom) M Cox (South Africa) C Drysdale	6	6
(Ecuador) P Segura (United States) S Segura	w/o
(Paraguay) V Pecci (Argentina) T Vázquez
(United States) J Austin (United States) C Owens	w/o
3	(United States) B Lutz (United States) S Smith

Second round
(United States) D Dell (United States) B Martin	5	6	3
(Chile) P Cornejo (Chile) J Fillol	7	2	6
(Australia) B Carmichael (New Zealand) O Parun	4	4
7	(United States) J Connors (Romania) I Năstase	6	6
(United States) A Neely (Sweden) T Svensson	6	5	6
(United Kingdom) M Cox (South Africa) C Drysdale	2	7	3
(Ecuador) P Segura (United States) S Segura	2	0
(United States) J Austin (United States) C Owens	6	6

Third round
(Chile) P Cornejo (Chile) J Fillol	7	4	4
7	(United States) J Connors (Romania) I Năstase	5	6	6
(United States) A Neely (Sweden) T Svensson	7	6
(United States) J Austin (United States) C Owens	6	3

Quarterfinals
7	(United States) J Connors (Romania) I Năstase	6	6
(United States) A Neely (Sweden) T Svensson	2	2

==== Section 4 ====
First round
(Australia) S Docherty (United States) M Fishbach	3	6
(United States) A Ashe (United States) D Ralston	6	7
(Sweden) B Borg (Australia) R Laver	6	6
(United States) R Fagel (United States) P Fishbach	3	3
(Sweden) B Andersson (Sweden) K Johansson	4	6	1
(United States) S Siegel (United States) S Turner	6	4	6
(United States) C Leeds (United States) V Winitsky	2	3
(Australia) P Dent (Australia) W Lloyd	6	6
(United States) D Stockton (United States) E van Dillen	6	6
(Colombia) Á Betancur (Chile) H Gildemeister	1	2
(United States) E Dibbs (United States) H Solomon	1	1
(Australia) T Roche (Australia) A Stone	6	6
(Brazil) F Gentil (Brazil) C Kirmayr
(Mexico) M Lara (Mexico) J Loyo Mayo	w/o
(United States) C Graebner (Australia) F Stolle	5	6
2	(Spain) J Gisbert (Spain) M Orantes	7	7

Second round
(United States) A Ashe (United States) D Ralston	5	6	4
(Sweden) B Borg (Australia) R Laver	7	4	6
(United States) S Siegel (United States) S Turner	1	2
(Australia) P Dent (Australia) W Lloyd	6	6
(United States) D Stockton (United States) E van Dillen	6	6
(Australia) T Roche (Australia) A Stone	2	4
(Mexico) M Lara (Mexico) J Loyo Mayo	4	4
2	(Spain) J Gisbert (Spain) M Orantes	6	6

Third round
(Sweden) B Borg (Australia) R Laver	1	4
(Australia) P Dent (Australia) W Lloyd	6	6
(United States) D Stockton (United States) E van Dillen	7	7
2	(Spain) J Gisbert (Spain) M Orantes	6	6

Quarterfinals
(Australia) P Dent (Australia) W Lloyd	4	7	2
(United States) D Stockton (United States) E van Dillen	6	6	6
