= 1975 Arkansas International =

- Date: February 3–9
- Edition: 2nd
- Category: USLTA Indoor Circuit
- Draw: 32S / 16D
- Prize money: $25,000
- Surface: Hard
- Location: North Little Rock, AR, US
- Venue: Burns Park

Champions

Singles
- (United States) Billy Martin

Doubles
- (Mexico) Marcello Lara / (Australia) Barry Phillips-Moore
← 1974 ·	Arkansas International Tennis Tournament	· 1976 →

The 1975 Arkansas International was a men's tennis tournament played on hardcourts at Burns Park in North Little Rock, Arkansas in the United States that was part of the 1975 USLTA-IPA Indoor Circuit. It was the second edition of the event and was held from February 3 through February 9, 1975. Fourth-seeded Billy Martin won the singles title and earned $5,000 first-prize money.

== Finals ==
=== Singles ===
(United States) Billy Martin defeated (United States) George Hardie 6–2, 7–6^{(5–4)}

- It was Martin's only singles title of his career.

=== Doubles ===
(Mexico) Marcello Lara / (Australia) Barry Phillips-Moore defeated (United States) Jeff Austin / (United States) Charles Owens 6–4, 6–3
