= 1976 Arkansas International =

- Date: March 1–7
- Edition: 3rd
- Category: USLTA-IPA Indoor Circuit
- Draw: 32S / 16D
- Prize money: $35,000
- Surface: Hard / indoor
- Location: North Little Rock, AR, US
- Venue: Burns Park

Champions

Singles
- (Pakistan) Haroon Rahim

Doubles
- (Australia) Syd Ball / (Australia) Ray Ruffels
← 1975 ·	Arkansas International Tennis Tournament	· 1977 →

The 1976 Arkansas International was a men's tennis tournament played on indoor hardcourts at Burns Park in North Little Rock, Arkansas in the United States that was part of the 1976 USLTA-IPA Indoor Circuit. It was the third edition of the event and was held from March 1 through March 7, 1976. Fourth-seeded Haroon Rahim won the singles title and earned $7,000 first-prize money.

== Finals ==
=== Singles ===
(Pakistan) Haroon Rahim defeated (Australia) Colin Dibley 6–4, 7–5

- It was Rahim's 2nd and last singles title of the year and of his career.

=== Doubles ===
(Australia) Syd Ball / (Australia) Ray Ruffels defeated (Paraguay) Giuliano Pecci / (Pakistan) Haroon Rahim 6–3, 6–7, 6–3
