= 1974 Arkansas International =

- Date: February 4–10
- Edition: 1st
- Category: USLTA Indoor Circuit
- Draw: 29S / 13D
- Prize money: $20,000
- Surface: Hard
- Location: North Little Rock, AR, US
- Venue: Burns Park

Champions

Singles
- (United States) Jimmy Connors

Doubles
- (West Germany) Jürgen Fassbender / (West Germany) Karl Meiler
Arkansas International Tennis Tournament	· 1975 →

The 1974 Arkansas International was a men's tennis tournament played on hard courts at Burns Park in North Little Rock, Arkansas in the United States that was part of the 1974 USLTA Indoor Circuit. It was the inaugural edition of the event and was held from February 4 through February 10, 1974. First-seeded Jimmy Connors won the singles title and earned $4,000 first-prize money.

== Finals ==
=== Singles ===
(United States) Jimmy Connors defeated (West Germany) Karl Meiler 6–2, 6–1

- It was Connors' 3rd singles title of the year and the 20th of his career.

=== Doubles ===
(West Germany) Jürgen Fassbender / (West Germany) Karl Meiler defeated (United States) Vitas Gerulaitis / (South Africa) Bob Hewitt 6–0, 6–2
