= 1975 Roanoke International =

- Date: January 29 – February 2
- Edition: 4th
- Category: USLTA Indoor Circuit
- Draw: 24S / 9D
- Prize money: $25,000
- Surface: Carpet / indoor
- Location: Roanoke, Virginia, U.S.
- Venue: Roanoke Civic Center

Champions

Singles
- (United Kingdom) Roger Taylor

Doubles
- (United States) Vitas Gerulaitis / (United States) Sandy Mayer
- Roanoke International Tennis Tournament

The 1975 Roanoke International, also known as the Roanoke Invitational Tennis Tournament, was a men's tennis tournament played on indoor carpet courts at the Roanoke Civic Center in Roanoke, Virginia, in the United States that was part of the 1975 USLTA-IPA Indoor Circuit. It was the fourth and last edition of the event and was held from January 29 through February 2, 1975. Unseeded Roger Taylor won the singles title.

== Finals ==
=== Singles ===
(United Kingdom) Roger Taylor defeated (United States) Vitas Gerulaitis 7–6, 7–6

- It was Taylor's 1st singles title of the year and the 8th of his career.

=== Doubles ===
(United States) Vitas Gerulaitis / (United States) Sandy Mayer defeated (Spain) Juan Gisbert Sr. / (Romania) Ion Țiriac 7–6, 1–6, 6–3
