= 1975 US Open – Men's singles =

Men's singles
- 1975 US Open

Final
- Champion: (Spain) Manuel Orantes
- Runner-up: (United States) Jimmy Connors
- Score: 6–4, 6–3, 6–3

Details
- Draw: 128
- Seeds: 16

Events
Singles	men	women		boys	girls
Doubles	men	women	mixed	boys	girls
WC Singles	men	women	quad
WC Doubles	men	women	quad
Legends	men	women	mixed
- US Open

Manuel Orantes defeated defending champion Jimmy Connors in the final, 6–4, 6–3, 6–3 to win the men's singles tennis title at the 1975 US Open. It was his only major singles title. Orantes saved five match points en route to the title, against Guillermo Vilas in the semifinals.

This was the first of three editions of the US Open to be held on clay courts, previously being played on grass courts.

== Format ==
Unlike the previous year, the first three rounds were best of three sets.

== Seeds ==
The seeded players are listed below. Manuel Orantes is the champion; others show the round in which they were eliminated.

1. (United States) Jimmy Connors (finalist)
2. (Argentina) Guillermo Vilas (semifinalist)
3. (Spain) Manuel Orantes (champion)
4. (United States) Arthur Ashe (fourth round)
5. (Sweden) Björn Borg (semifinalist)
6. (Netherlands) Tom Okker (second round)
7. (Australia) Tony Roche (second round)
8. (Romania) Ilie Năstase (quarterfinalist)
9. (Australia) Rod Laver (fourth round)
10. (United States) Roscoe Tanner (third round)
11. (Mexico) Raúl Ramírez (fourth round)
12. (Australia) John Alexander (second round)
13. (United States) Harold Solomon (fourth round)
14. (United States) Vitas Gerulaitis (second round)
15. (Czechoslovakia) Jan Kodeš (fourth round)
16. (United States) Cliff Richey (second round)

== Draw ==
=== Key ===
- Q = Qualifier
- WC = Wild card
- LL = Lucky loser
- r = Retired

=== Final eight ===
Quarterfinals
1	(United States) Jimmy Connors	6	6	6
(Rhodesia) Andrew Pattison	2	1	2
(United States) Eddie Dibbs	4	6^{8}	6	6^{1}
5	(Sweden) Björn Borg	6	7^{10}	4	7^{7}
8	(Romania) Ilie Năstase	2	4	6	3
3	(Spain) Manuel Orantes	6	6	3	6
(Chile) Jaime Fillol	4	0	1
2	(Argentina) Guillermo Vilas	6	6	6

Semifinals
1	(United States) Jimmy Connors	7	7	7
5	(Sweden) Björn Borg	5	5	5
3	(Spain) Manuel Orantes	4	1	6	7	6
2	(Argentina) Guillermo Vilas	6	6	2	5	4

Final
1	(United States) Jimmy Connors	4	3	3
3	(Spain) Manuel Orantes	6	6	6

=== Section 1 ===
First round
1	(United States) Connors	6	6
(Australia) Masters	3	3
(Czechoslovakia) Hřebec	6	6	4
(United Kingdom) Taylor	7	1	6
(France) Goven	6	6
(Sweden) Andersson	2	3
(Socialist Federal Republic of Yugoslavia) Špear	7	6
(United States) McNair	5	0
13	(United States) Solomon	3	6	6
(Paraguay) Pecci Sr.	6	2	2
(Australia) Docherty	1	1
(Colombia) Molina	6	6
(Poland) Fibak	6	6
(South Africa) Yuill	3	0
(United States) Krulevitz	6	4	3
(United States) Austin	3	6	6

Second round
1	(United States) Connors	6	6
(United Kingdom) Taylor	2	0
(France) Goven	3	7	6
(Socialist Federal Republic of Yugoslavia) Špear	6	5	0
13	(United States) Solomon	6	6
(Colombia) Molina	2	2
(Poland) Fibak	7	7
(United States) Austin	6	5

Third round
1	(United States) Connors	6	6
(France) Goven	3	1
13	(United States) Solomon	4	6	7
(Poland) Fibak	6	0	6

Fourth round
1	(United States) Connors	6	6	5	6
13	(United States) Solomon	4	2	7	3

=== Section 2 ===
First round
6	(Netherlands) Okker	6	6
(West Germany) Fassbender	4	2
(Hungary) Taróczy	6	6
(Belgium) Mignot	4	4
(United Kingdom) Lloyd	6	6	6
(United States) Graebner	7	2	3
(South Africa) Hewitt	6	7
(Australia) Stolle	2	6
12	(Australia) Alexander	7	6
(United States) Riessen	6	1
(France) Proisy	4	2
(Rhodesia) Pattison	6	6
(South Africa) Drysdale	6	6
(United Kingdom) Feaver	4	4
(Argentina) Cano	2	6	7
(Chile) Cornejo	6	0	6

Second round
6	(Netherlands) Okker	3	4
(Hungary) Taróczy	6	6
(United Kingdom) Lloyd	0	6
(South Africa) Hewitt	6	7
12	(Australia) Alexander	0	6
(Rhodesia) Pattison	6	7
(South Africa) Drysdale	2	6	5
(Argentina) Cano	6	3	7

Third round
(Hungary) Taróczy	2	1
(South Africa) Hewitt	6	6
(Rhodesia) Pattison	5	6	7
(Argentina) Cano	7	4	5

Fourth round
(South Africa) Hewitt	4	2	6	2
(Rhodesia) Pattison	6	6	1	6

=== Section 3 ===
First round
4	(United States) Ashe	6	7
(United States) Amaya	3	6
(India) Amritraj	7	5	7
(Japan) Kamiwazumi	5	7	5
(South Africa) Moore	2	6	1
(Socialist Federal Republic of Yugoslavia) Franulović	6	3	6
(United States) Schoenfield	5	6	6
(Spain) Muñoz	7	3	7
16	(United States) Richey	7	6
(Mexico) Lara	6	0
(United States) Dibbs	7	6	6
(United States) Owens	5	7	2
(Colombia) Velasco Sr.	4	6	6
(Rhodesia) Dowdeswell	6	4	4
(Spain) Higueras	6	6
(United States) Fishbach	3	4

Second round
4	(United States) Ashe	6	6
(India) Amritraj	3	1
(Socialist Federal Republic of Yugoslavia) Franulović	5	7	6
(Spain) Muñoz	7	5	1
16	(United States) Richey	1	0
(United States) Dibbs	6	6
(Colombia) Velasco Sr.	4	6	1
(Spain) Higueras	6	2	6

Third round
4	(United States) Ashe	6	6
(Socialist Federal Republic of Yugoslavia) Franulović	2	0
(United States) Dibbs	6	6
(Spain) Higueras	3	0

Fourth round
4	(United States) Ashe	4	2	3
(United States) Dibbs	6	6	6

=== Section 4 ===
First round
5	(Sweden) Borg	6	6
(United States) Mayer	2	2
(United States) Estep	6	6
(Bolivia) Benavides	3	4
(United States) Brown	3	7	3
(Australia) Lloyd	6	6	6
(Australia) Case	6	6
(United States) Manson	2	4
9	(Australia) Laver	7	6
(Spain) Gisbert Sr	5	4
(United States) Ralston	6	7	5
(Chile) Fillol	7	6	7
(United States) Andrews	6	6
(United States) Whitlinger	2	0
(Czechoslovakia) Holeček	6	6
(United States) Reid	4	2

Second round
5	(Sweden) Borg	6	6
(United States) Estep	0	2
(Australia) Lloyd	4	1
(Australia) Case	6	6
9	(Australia) Laver	7	6
(Chile) Fillol	6	4
(United States) Andrews	7	5	7
(Czechoslovakia) Holeček	5	7	6

Third round
5	(Sweden) Borg	6	6
(Australia) Case	3	3
9	(Australia) Laver	6	6
(United States) Andrews	2	3

Fourth round
5	(Sweden) Borg	6	6	2	6
9	(Australia) Laver	1	4	6	2

=== Section 5 ===
First round
(Australia) Warwick	6	7
(Australia) Phillips-Moore	2	6
(New Zealand) Parun	6	6
(United States) Smith	4	2
(Czechoslovakia) Pála	6	7
(India) Amritraj	4	6
(United States) Van Dillen	2	7	5
11	(Mexico) Ramírez	6	6	7
(United States) Kreiss	2	4
(United Kingdom) Cox	6	6
(United States) Neely	6	7
(United States) Gorman	3	6
(Australia) Stone	6	7
(Australia) Carmichael	4	6
(United States) Lutz	2	1
8	(Romania) Năstase	6	6

Second round
(Australia) Warwick	5	3
(New Zealand) Parun	7	6
(Czechoslovakia) Pála	4	4
11	(Mexico) Ramírez	6	6
(United Kingdom) Cox	6	6
(United States) Neely	4	1
(Australia) Stone	2	3
8	(Romania) Năstase	6	6

Third round
(New Zealand) Parun	6	3	3
11	(Mexico) Ramírez	1	6	6
(United Kingdom) Cox	0	4
8	(Romania) Năstase	6	6

Fourth round
11	(Mexico) Ramírez	4	7	0	7	3
8	(Romania) Năstase	6	5	6	6	6

=== Section 6 ===
First round
(Czechoslovakia) Zednik	7	3	6
(Sweden) Johansson	6	6	7
(United States) Turner	6	6
(United States) Scott	1	2
(United States) Fagel	4	2
(France) Jauffret	6	6
(Brazil) Rasgado	7	3	2
14	(United States) Gerulaitis	5	6	6
(Argentina) Álvarez	6	6
(United States) Teacher	3	2
(Chile) Prajoux	6	4	2
(West Germany) Pohmann	3	6	6
(India) Menon	6	7
(United States) Gerken	4	5
(South Africa) Mitton	3	2
3	(Spain) Orantes	6	6

Second round
(Sweden) Johansson	6	6
(United States) Turner	1	2
(France) Jauffret	7	7
14	(United States) Gerulaitis	6	5
(Argentina) Álvarez	1	1
(West Germany) Pohmann	6	6
(India) Menon	2	2
3	(Spain) Orantes	6	6

Third round
(Sweden) Johansson	5	4
(France) Jauffret	7	6
(West Germany) Pohmann	2	6	1
3	(Spain) Orantes	6	3	6

Fourth round
(France) Jauffret	4	6	3	4
3	(Spain) Orantes	6	3	6	6

=== Section 7 ===
First round
(Soviet Union) Metreveli	7	2	1
(United States) Gottfried	6	6	6
(West Germany) Meiler	7	6
(Japan) Kuki	5	3
(Australia) Dent	6	6
(United States) Borowiak	3	0
(South Africa) Schneider	5	6	1
10	(United States) Tanner	7	4	6
(United States) Pasarell	5	6	7
(United Kingdom) Mottram	7	3	5
(Netherlands) Thung	0	3
(South Africa) McMillan	6	6
(Chile) Fillol	6	6
(Sweden) Svensson	1	2
(United States) Kanter	1	5
7	(Australia) Roche	6	7

Second round
(United States) Gottfried	4	3
(West Germany) Meiler	6	6
(Australia) Dent	2	1
10	(United States) Tanner	6	6
(United States) Pasarell	7	6
(South Africa) McMillan	5	2
(Chile) Fillol	6	6
7	(Australia) Roche	0	2

Third round
(West Germany) Meiler	6	6	6
10	(United States) Tanner	7	4	4
(United States) Pasarell	3	5
(Chile) Fillol	6	7

Fourth round
(West Germany) Meiler	1	1	2
(Chile) Fillol	6	6	6

=== Section 8 ===
First round
(United States) Waltke	6	6	6
(Brazil) Kirmayr	7	1	1
(Mexico) Loyo-Mayo	4	5
(Australia) Ball	6	7
(Austria) Kary	6	7
(United States) Holmes	4	5
(United Kingdom) Stilwell	3	1
15	(Czechoslovakia) Kodeš	6	6
(United Kingdom) Battrick	3	6	3
(United States) Stockton	6	3	6
(United States) Mayer	3	6	6
(United States) Stewart	6	4	3
(Colombia) Betancur	2	6	6
(United States) Martin	6	4	1
(Chile) Gildemeister	2	2
2	(Argentina) Vilas	6	6

Second round
(United States) Waltke	2	3
(Australia) Ball	6	6
(Austria) Kary	1	7	5
15	(Czechoslovakia) Kodeš	6	5	7
(United States) Stockton	6	6
(United States) Mayer	4	4
(Colombia) Betancur	1	1
2	(Argentina) Vilas	6	6

Third round
(Australia) Ball	2	0
15	(Czechoslovakia) Kodeš	6	6
(United States) Stockton	1	4
2	(Argentina) Vilas	6	6

Fourth round
15	(Czechoslovakia) Kodeš	2	0	0
2	(Argentina) Vilas	6	6	6

Preceded by 1975 Wimbledon Championships – Men's singles	Grand Slam men's singles	Succeeded by 1976 Australian Open – Men's singles
