= 1977 Fairfield Bay Tennis Classic =

- Date: January 31 – February 6
- Edition: 4th
- Category: Grand Prix (One star)
- Draw: 32S / 16D
- Prize money: $50,000
- Surface: Hard / indoor
- Location: North Little Rock, AR, US
- Venue: Burns Park

Champions

Singles
- (United States) Sandy Mayer

Doubles
- (Australia) Colin Dibley / (Pakistan) Haroon Rahim
- Arkansas International Tennis Tournament

The 1977 Fairfield Bay Tennis Classic, also known as the Arkansas International, was a men's tennis tournament played on indoor hardcourts at Burns Park in North Little Rock, Arkansas in the United States that was part of the 1977 Grand Prix circuit. It was the fourth edition of the event and was held from January 31 through February 6, 1977. Third-seeded Sandy Mayer won the singles title and earned $10,000 first-prize money.

== Finals ==
=== Singles ===
(United States) Sandy Mayer defeated (Pakistan) Haroon Rahim 6–2, 6–4

- It was Mayer's 1st singles title of the year and the 5th of his career.

=== Doubles ===
(Australia) Colin Dibley / (Pakistan) Haroon Rahim defeated (South Africa) Bob Hewitt / (South Africa) Frew McMillan 6–7, 6–3, 6–3
