= Dave Kanter =

American tennis player

- Full name: David Kanter
- Country (sports): United States
- Plays: Left-handed

Singles
- Career record: 0–2
- Highest ranking: No. 326 (June 14, 1976)

Grand Slam singles results
- US Open: 1R (1975)

Doubles
- Career record: 0–2

Grand Slam doubles results
- US Open: 1R (1975)

David Kanter is an American former professional tennis player.

Raised in Kansas City, Kanter attended Shawnee Mission East High School and played collegiate tennis for Arizona State University from 1971 to 1974. A left-handed player, he reached a best singles world ranking of 326 and featured in the main draw of the 1975 US Open, where he was beaten in the first round by seventh-seed Tony Roche.
