= 1975 Baltimore International =

- Date: January 13–19
- Edition: 4th
- Category: USLTA-IPA Indoor Circuit
- Draw: 16S / 8D
- Prize money: $30,000
- Surface: Carpet / indoor
- Location: Baltimore, MD, U.S.
- Venue: Towson State College

Champions

Singles
- (United States) Brian Gottfried

Doubles
- (Australia) Dick Crealy / (Australia) Ray Ruffels
← 1974 ·	Baltimore International	· 1976 →

The 1975 Baltimore International was a men's tennis tournament played on indoor carpet courts at the Towson State College in Baltimore, Maryland in the United States. The event was part of the 1975 USLTA-IPA Indoor Circuit. It was the fourth edition of the tournament and was held from January 13 through January 19, 1975. Third-seeded Brian Gottfried won the singles title.

== Finals ==
=== Singles ===
(United States) Brian Gottfried defeated (Australia) Allan Stone 3–6, 6–2, 6–3

- It was Gottfried' 1st singles title of the year and the 4th of his career.

=== Doubles ===
(Australia) Dick Crealy / (Australia) Ray Ruffels defeated (Egypt) Ismail El Shafei / (South Africa) Frew McMillan 6–4, 6–3
