= 1978 Baltimore International =

Men's tennis tournament in Maryland, US

- Date: January 16–22
- Edition: 7th
- Category: Independent
- Draw: 32S / 16D
- Prize money: $100,000
- Surface: Carpet / indoor
- Location: Baltimore, Maryland, U.S.
- Venue: Towson State College

Champions

Singles
- (South Africa) Cliff Drysdale

Doubles
- (South Africa) Frew McMillan / (United States) Fred McNair
← 1977 ·	Baltimore International	· 1979 →

The 1978 Baltimore International was a men's tennis tournament played on indoor carpet courts at the Towson State College in Baltimore, Maryland in the United States. It was an independent tournament, not part of the 1978 Grand Prix circuit. It was the seventh edition of the event and was held from January 16 through January 22, 1978. Fifth-seeded Cliff Drysdale won the singles title and earned $25,000 first-prize money.

== Finals ==
=== Singles ===
(South Africa) Cliff Drysdale defeated (United States) Tom Gorman 7–5, 6–3

- It was Drysdale's 1st singles title of the year and the 5th and last of his career in the Open Era.

=== Doubles ===
(South Africa) Frew McMillan / (United States) Fred McNair defeated (United Kingdom) Roger Taylor / (Italy) Antonio Zugarelli 6–3, 7–5
