= 1976 Baltimore International =

- Date: January 20–25
- Edition: 5th
- Category: USTA-IPA Indoor Circuit
- Draw: 16S / 8D
- Prize money: $50,000
- Surface: Carpet / indoor
- Location: Baltimore, MD, U.S.
- Venue: University of Maryland Baltimore County Fieldhouse

Champions

Singles
- (United States) Tom Gorman

Doubles
- (South Africa) Bob Hewitt / (South Africa) Frew McMillan
← 1975 ·	Baltimore International	· 1977 →

The 1976 Baltimore International was a men's tennis tournament played on indoor carpet courts at the University of Maryland Baltimore County Fieldhouse in Baltimore, Maryland in the United States. The event was part of the 1976 USTA-IPA Indoor Circuit. It was the fifth edition of the tournament and was held from January 20 through January 25, 1976. Unseeded Tom Gorman won the singles title and earned $12,000 first-prize money.

== Finals ==
=== Singles ===
(United States) Tom Gorman defeated (Romania) Ilie Năstase 7–5, 6–3

- It was Gorman's 1st singles title of the year and the 6th of his career.

=== Doubles ===
(South Africa) Bob Hewitt / (South Africa) Frew McMillan defeated (Romania) Ilie Năstase / (United States) Cliff Richey 3–6, 7–6, 6–4
