= 1977 Baltimore International =

- Date: January 17–23
- Edition: 6th
- Category: Grand Prix (Three star)
- Draw: 32S / 16D
- Prize money: $100,000
- Surface: Carpet / indoor
- Location: Baltimore, Maryland, U.S.
- Venue: Towson State College

Champions

Singles
- (United States) Brian Gottfried

Doubles
- (Romania) Ion Țiriac / (Argentina) Guillermo Vilas
← 1976 ·	Baltimore International	· 1978 →

The 1977 Baltimore International was a men's tennis tournament played on indoor carpet courts at the Towson State College in Baltimore, Maryland in the United States that was part of the 1977 Grand Prix circuit. It was the sixth edition of the event and was held from January 17 through January 23, 1977. Second-seeded Brian Gottfried won the singles title, his second at the event after 1975, and won $20,000 first-prize money.

== Finals ==
=== Singles ===
(United States) Brian Gottfried defeated (Argentina) Guillermo Vilas 6–3, 7–6

- It was Gottfried' 1st singles title of the year and the 8th of his career.

=== Doubles ===
(Romania) Ion Țiriac / (Argentina) Guillermo Vilas defeated (Australia) Ross Case / (Czech Republic) Jan Kodeš 6–3, 6–7, 6–4
