= Armistead Neely =

American tennis player (1947–2024)

- Full name: Armistead C. Neely
- Country (sports): United States
- Born: March 19, 1947; Mobile, Alabama, U.S.
- Died: March 7, 2024 (aged 76)
- Plays: Right-handed

Singles
- Career record: 14–41
- Highest ranking: No. 144 (June 2, 1975)

Grand Slam singles results
- French Open: 2R (1975)
- Wimbledon: 1R (1974)
- US Open: 2R (1966, 1969, 1971, 1974, 1975)

Doubles
- Career record: 16–37

Grand Slam doubles results
- French Open: 2R (1975)
- Wimbledon: 2R (1973)
- US Open: QF (1975)

Armistead Neely (March 19, 1947 – March 7, 2024) was an American professional tennis player. He is a member of the Southern Tennis Hall of Fame.

== Biography ==
Neely grew up in Tampa, Florida, where he moved to as a child from Mobile, Alabama. He played collegiate tennis for the University of Florida, earning All-American honors in 1968 and 1969. During his time at the University of Florida he remained unbeaten in SEC singles dual matches.

A right-handed player, Neely competed on the professional tour in the 1970s and had a career high singles ranking of 144 in the world. He featured regularly in the main draw of the US Open and also made appearances at the French Open and Wimbledon. His best grand slam performance came at the 1975 US Open, where he reached the quarter-finals of the men's doubles, partnering Tenny Svensson.

From 1977 to 1981 he was head coach of men's tennis at the University of Alabama.

Neely died on March 7, 2024, at the age of 76.
