= 1975 U.S. National Indoor Tennis Championships =

- Date: February 10–16
- Edition: 5th
- Category: USLTA Indoor Circuit
- Draw: 53S / 24D
- Prize money: $50,000
- Surface: Carpet / Indoor
- Location: Salisbury, Maryland, U.S.
- Venue: Wicomico Youth and Civic Center

Champions

Singles
- (United States) Jimmy Connors

Doubles
- (United States) Jimmy Connors / (South Africa) Frew McMillan
- U.S. National Indoor Championships

The 1975 U.S. National Indoor Tennis Championships was a men's tennis tournament held at the Wicomico Youth and Civic Center in Salisbury, Maryland. The event was part of the 1975 USLTA-IPA Indoor Circuit. It was the fifth edition of the tournament and was held from February 10 through February 16, 1975, and played on indoor carpet courts. Second-seeded Jimmy Connors won the singles title and earned $9,000 first-prize money.

== Finals ==
=== Singles ===
(United States) Jimmy Connors defeated (United States) Vitas Gerulaitis 5–7, 7–5, 6–1, 3–6, 6–0

- It was Connors' 3rd singles title of the year, and the 35th of his career.

=== Doubles ===
(United States) Jimmy Connors / (Romania) Ilie Năstase defeated (Czechoslovakia) Jan Kodeš / (United Kingdom) Roger Taylor 7–6, 6–2
