= 1975 US Open – Mixed doubles =

Mixed doubles
- 1975 US Open

Final
- Champions: (United States) Dick Stockton (United States) Rosie Casals
- Runners-up: (Australia) Fred Stolle (United States) Billie Jean King
- Score: 6–3, 6–7, 6–3

Details
- Draw: 32
- Seeds: 4

Events
Singles	men	women		boys	girls
Doubles	men	women	mixed	boys	girls
WC Singles	men	women	quad
WC Doubles	men	women	quad
Legends	men	women	mixed
- US Open

Geoff Masters and Pam Teeguarden were the defending champions but lost in the quarterfinals to Alex Metreveli and Olga Morozova.

Dick Stockton and Rosemary Casals won in the final 6-3, 6-7, 6-3 against Fred Stolle and Billie Jean King.

== Seeds ==
1. (United States) Marty Riessen / (Australia) Margaret Court (semifinals)
2. (Australia) Fred Stolle / (United States) Billie Jean King (final)
3. (Australia) Geoff Masters / (United States) Pam Teeguarden (quarterfinals)
4. (United States) Dick Stockton / (United States) Rosie Casals (champions)

== Draw ==
Key

- Q = Qualifier
- WC = Wild card
- LL = Lucky loser
- Alt = Alternate
- ITF = ITF entry
- PR = Protected ranking
- SR = Special ranking
- SE = Special exempt
- JE = Junior exempt
- JR = Junior Accelerator Programme entrant
- CO = College Accelerator Programme entrant
- NG = Next Gen Accelerator Program entrant
- w/o = Walkover
- r = Retired
- d = Defaulted

=== Finals ===
Semifinals
1	(United States) Marty Riessen (Australia) Margaret Court	6	6	3
4	(United States) Dick Stockton (United States) Rosie Casals	7	3	6
(Soviet Union) Alex Metreveli (Soviet Union) Olga Morozova	6	3	4
2	(Australia) Fred Stolle (United States) Billie Jean King	3	6	6

Final
4	(United States) Dick Stockton (United States) Rosie Casals	6	6	6
2	(Australia) Fred Stolle (United States) Billie Jean King	3	7	3

=== Top half ===
First round
1	(United States) M Riessen (Australia) M Court	6	6
(United States) J Andrews (South Africa) B Cuypers	2	3
(United States) J McEnroe (United Kingdom) L Beaven	7	6
(United States) B Heinbecker (United States) C Aucamp	5	3
(Argentina) R Cano (Romania) M Simionescu	6	5
(Australia) R Case (France) F Dürr	7	7
(Romania) I Năstase (Brazil) M Bueno	6	6
(India) A Amritraj (United States) P Bostrom	3	1
4	(United States) D Stockton (United States) R Casals	7	6
(United States) P Fleming (United States) T Holladay	6	2
(India) J Singh (South Africa) L Boshoff	7	6
(United States) H Richardson (United States) A Gibson	5	3
(United States) R Reid (Australia) K Reid	1	3
(United States) V Gerulaitis (United States) R Gerulaitis	6	6
(United States) E Scott (United States) R Fox	1	7	7
(Bolivia) R Benavides (Colombia) I Fernández	6	6	5

Second round
1	(United States) M Riessen (Australia) M Court	6	6
(United States) J McEnroe (United Kingdom) L Beaven	1	3
(Australia) R Case (France) F Dürr
(Romania) I Năstase (Brazil) M Bueno	w/o
4	(United States) D Stockton (United States) R Casals	6	6
(India) J Singh (South Africa) L Boshoff	2	2
(United States) V Gerulaitis (United States) R Gerulaitis	6	2	7
(United States) E Scott (United States) R Fox	2	6	6

Quarterfinals
1	(United States) M Riessen (Australia) M Court	4	6	4
(Romania) I Năstase (Brazil) M Bueno	6	3	4^{r}
4	(United States) D Stockton (United States) R Casals	6	6
(United States) V Gerulaitis (United States) R Gerulaitis	2	3

Semifinals
1	(United States) M Riessen (Australia) M Court	6	6	3
4	(United States) D Stockton (United States) R Casals	7	3	6

=== Bottom half ===
First round
(Soviet Union) A Metreveli (Soviet Union) O Morozova	6	7
(France) J Lovera (France) G Chanfreau	1	5
(United States) G Mulloy (United States) B Smith	1	2
(South Africa) D Schneider (South Africa) G Stevens	6	6
(Mexico) J Loyo Mayo (Sweden) I Bentzer	0	1
(Australia) A Stone (Netherlands) B Stöve	6	6
(United States) R Garrido (United States) S Greer	1	2
3	(Australia) G Masters (United States) P Teeguarden	6	6
(South Africa) B Mitton (United States) R Tenney	6	4	7
(United States) S Segura (United States) J Evert	4	6	6
(United States) H Schoenfield (United States) A Kiyomura	6	2	1
(United States) C Graebner (United States) S Stap	3	6	6
(Romania) I Țiriac (Romania) V Ruzici	6	7
(New Zealand) C Lewis (United States) J Newberry	4	5
(Australia) T Roche (United States) K Shaw	6	2
2	(Australia) F Stolle (United States) BJ King	7	6

Second round
(Soviet Union) A Metreveli (Soviet Union) O Morozova	6	4	7
(South Africa) D Schneider (South Africa) G Stevens	3	6	6
(Australia) A Stone (Netherlands) B Stöve	3	6	2
3	(Australia) G Masters (United States) P Teeguarden	6	3	6
(South Africa) B Mitton (United States) R Tenney	5	4
(United States) C Graebner (United States) S Stap	7	6
(Romania) I Țiriac (Romania) V Ruzici	1	2
2	(Australia) F Stolle (United States) BJ King	6	6

Quarterfinals
(Soviet Union) A Metreveli (Soviet Union) O Morozova	6	3	6
3	(Australia) G Masters (United States) P Teeguarden	4	6	3
(United States) C Graebner (United States) S Stap	5	3
2	(Australia) F Stolle (United States) BJ King	7	6

Semifinals
(Soviet Union) A Metreveli (Soviet Union) O Morozova	6	3	4
2	(Australia) F Stolle (United States) BJ King	3	6	6
