= 1975 US Open – Women's singles =

Women's singles
- 1975 US Open

Final
- Champion: (United States) Chris Evert
- Runner-up: (Australia) Evonne Goolagong
- Score: 5–7, 6–4, 6–2

Details
- Draw: 64
- Seeds: 8

Events
Singles	men	women		boys	girls
Doubles	men	women	mixed	boys	girls
WC Singles	men	women	quad
WC Doubles	men	women	quad
Legends	men	women	mixed
- US Open

Chris Evert defeated Evonne Cawley in the final, 5–7, 6–4, 6–2 to win the women's singles tennis title at the 1975 US Open. It was her first US Open title, following four consecutive semifinal finishes at the tournament, and her fourth major singles title overall.

Billie Jean King was the reigning champion, but did not compete this year.

This was the first edition of the tournament to be played on clay courts, having previously been held on grass. It would change surfaces again, to hardcourt, just three years later in 1978.

== Seeds ==
The seeded players are listed below. Chris Evert is the champion; others show the round in which they were eliminated.

1. (United States) Chris Evert (champion)
2. (United Kingdom) Virginia Wade (semifinalist)
3. (Czechoslovakia) Martina Navratilova (semifinalist)
4. (Australia) Evonne Goolagong (finalist)
5. (Australia) Margaret Court (quarterfinalist)
6. (Soviet Union) Olga Morozova (second round)
7. (France) Françoise Dürr (second round)
8. (United States) Julie Heldman (second round)

== Draw ==
=== Key ===
- Q = Qualifier
- WC = Wild card
- LL = Lucky loser
- r = Retired

=== Final eight ===
Quarterfinals
1	(United States) Chris Evert	6	6
(Australia) Kerry Melville Reid	2	1
3	(Czechoslovakia) Martina Navratilova	6	6
5	(Australia) Margaret Court	2	4
(Japan) Kazuko Sawamatsu	6	5
4	(Australia) Evonne Cawley	7	7
(West Germany) Katja Ebbinghaus	3	0
2	(United Kingdom) Virginia Wade	6	6

Semifinals
1	(United States) Chris Evert	6	6
3	(Czechoslovakia) Martina Navratilova	4	4
4	(Australia) Evonne Cawley	7	6
2	(United Kingdom) Virginia Wade	5	1

Finals
1	(United States) Chris Evert	5	6	6
4	(Australia) Evonne Cawley	7	4	2

=== Earlier rounds ===
==== Section 1 ====
First round
1	(United States) Evert	6	6
(Australia) Hunt	1	0
(Soviet Union) Chmyreva	7	2	6
(United States) Holladay	6	6	3
(Australia) Doerner	7	1	6
(United Kingdom) Charles	6	6	2
(United States) Overton	4	6	6
(United States) Hogan	6	0	1
7	(France) Dürr	6	6
(Czechoslovakia) Tomanová	1	1
(Australia) Melville Reid	6	6
(Belgium) Gurdal	0	1
(South Africa) Stevens	7	6
(United States) Anthony	6	3
(United Kingdom) Barker	3	6	6
(United States) Stap	6	1	3

Second round
1	(United States) Evert	6	6
(Soviet Union) Chmyreva	0	3
(Australia) Doerner	1	1
(United States) Overton	6	6
7	(France) Dürr	3	0
(Australia) Melville Reid	6	6
(South Africa) Stevens	6	6	6
(United Kingdom) Barker	0	7	4

Third round
1	(United States) Evert	6	6
(United States) Overton	0	1
(Australia) Melville Reid	4	6	6
(South Africa) Stevens	6	4	4

Quarterfinals
1	(United States) Evert	6	6
(Australia) Melville Reid	2	1

==== Section 2 ====
First round
3	(Czechoslovakia) Navratilova	6	6
(United Kingdom) Mappin	3	3
(United States) Russell	6	6
(South Africa) Kloss	0	2
(United States) Ganz	6	6
(United States) Walsh	4	4
(United States) May	7	6
(United States) DuPont	6	1
5	(Australia) Court	6	6
(France) Fuchs	2	0
(Netherlands) Stöve	6	6
(United States) Redondo	1	4
(United States) Newberry	6	6
(France) Chanfreau	2	4
(Australia) Fromholtz	6	6
(United States) Louie	2	2

Second round
3	(Czechoslovakia) Navratilova	6	3	6
(United States) Russell	2	6	2
(United States) Ganz	2	2
(United States) May	6	6
5	(Australia) Court	5	6	6
(Netherlands) Stöve	7	2	1
(United States) Newberry	7	6
(Australia) Fromholtz	6	4

Third round
3	(Czechoslovakia) Navratilova	6	6
(United States) May	3	0
5	(Australia) Court	7	6
(United States) Newberry	5	3

Quarterfinals
3	(Czechoslovakia) Navratilova	6	6
5	(Australia) Court	2	4

==== Section 3 ====
First round
(United States) Evert	6	4	6
(United Kingdom) Coles	3	6	1
(South Africa) Boshoff	6	6
(Australia) Dimond	2	2
(Japan) Sawamatsu	6	6
(United States) Reynolds	4	0
8	(United States) Heldman	6	7
(United States) Stap	3	5
(Netherlands) Zwaan	3	7	7
(South Africa) Cuypers	6	5	6
(United States) Ziegenfuss	6	6
(United Kingdom) Beaven	3	4
(United States) Schallau	3	6	6
(United States) Richey Gunter	6	4	4
4	(Australia) Goolagong	6	6
(United States) Michel	0	0

Second round
(United States) Evert	3	1
(South Africa) Boshoff	6	6
(Japan) Sawamatsu	6	6
8	(United States) Heldman	4	1
(Netherlands) Zwaan	6	2	6
(United States) Ziegenfuss	3	6	7
(United States) Schallau	3	1
4	(Australia) Goolagong	6	6

Third round
(South Africa) Boshoff	2	6
(Japan) Sawamatsu	6	7
(United States) Ziegenfuss	3	2
4	(Australia) Goolagong	6	6

Quarterfinals
(Japan) Sawamatsu	6	5
4	(Australia) Goolagong	7	7

==== Section 4 ====
First round
(Australia) Gourlay	7	6
(Argentina) Giscafré	5	4
(West Germany) Ebbinghaus	6	5	6
(Romania) Ruzici	3	7	2
(United States) Teeguarden	6	6
(Italy) Nasuelli	4	3
6	(Soviet Union) Morozova	7	3	6
(Socialist Federal Republic of Yugoslavia) Jaušovec	5	6	1
(United States) Norton	6	0	7
(Uruguay) Bonicelli	0	6	6
(United States) Meyer	6	6
(Colombia) Fernández-De Soto	2	0
(Soviet Union) Kroschina	6	6
(United States) Casals	4	2
2	(United Kingdom) Wade	6	6
(United States) Latham	1	1

Second round
(Australia) Gourlay	4	5
(West Germany) Ebbinghaus	6	7
(United States) Teeguarden	4	6	7
6	(Soviet Union) Morozova	6	2	6
(United States) Norton	7	1	6
(United States) Meyer	5	6	2
(Soviet Union) Kroschina	1	3
2	(United Kingdom) Wade	6	6

Third round
(West Germany) Ebbinghaus	6	6
(United States) Teeguarden	0	3
(United States) Norton	6	4	3
2	(United Kingdom) Wade	4	6	6

Quarterfinals
(West Germany) Ebbinghaus	3	0
2	(United Kingdom) Wade	6	6

== See also ==
- Evert–Navratilova rivalry

Preceded by 1975 Wimbledon Championships – Women's singles	Grand Slam women's singles	Succeeded by 1976 Australian Open – Women's singles
