= 1975 Tennis South Invitational =

- Date: March 24–30
- Edition: 3rd
- Category: USLTA Indoor circuit
- Draw: 16S / 8D
- Prize money: $35,000
- Surface: Carpet / indoor
- Location: Jackson, Mississippi, U.S.
- Venue: Mississippi Coliseum

Champions

Singles
- (Australia) Ken Rosewall

Doubles
- (Australia) Ken Rosewall / (Australia) Fred Stolle
- Tennis South Invitational

The 1975 Tennis South Invitational was a men's tennis tournament played on indoor carpet courts at the Mississippi Coliseum in Jackson, Mississippi in the United States that was part of the 1975 USLTA-IPA Indoor Circuit. It was the third edition of the tournament and was held from March 24 through March 30, 1975. Second-seeded Ken Rosewall won the singles title and earned $10,000 first-prize money after defeating unseeded Butch Buchholz in the final.

== Finals ==
=== Singles ===
(Australia) Ken Rosewall defeated (United States) Butch Buchholz 7–5, 4–6, 7–6^{(7–3)}

- It was Rosewall's 1st singles title of the year and the 34th of his career in the Open Era.

=== Doubles ===
(Australia) Ken Rosewall / (Australia) Fred Stolle defeated (United States) Billy Martin / (Australia) John Newcombe 6–4, 2–6, 6–1
