= Spencer Segura =

American tennis player

- Country (sports): United States

Singles
- Career record: 2–16
- Highest ranking: No. 193 (Dec 15, 1975)

Grand Slam singles results
- Australian Open: 1R (1975)
- French Open: Q2 (1975)
- Wimbledon: Q3 (1976)

Doubles
- Career record: 8–17

Grand Slam doubles results
- French Open: 1R (1975)
- US Open: 2R (1975)

Grand Slam mixed doubles results
- US Open: 1R (1974, 1975)

Spencer Segura is an American former professional tennis player. He is the first born child of Ecuadorian-American tennis player Pancho Segura, from his marriage to Virginia Smith. He is the father of two kids. Genevieve Segura and Spencer Segura Jr.

Segura played collegiate tennis for the UCLA Bruins and served as team captain in 1974.

On the professional tour he had a best singles ranking of 193 and featured in the main draw of the 1975 Australian Open. He also made doubles main draw appearances at the French Open and US Open. One of his doubles partners was close friend Jimmy Connors, who was coached by Pancho Segura.
