= Funland Amusement Park (Little Rock, Arkansas) =

Small amusement park in Arkansas

Coordinates: 34.800272°N 92.302971°W

Funland Amusement Park was a small amusement park located in Burns Park, North Little Rock, Arkansas. The park featured several small family rides including a Ferris wheel and a train ride. The park was damaged by a tornado on March 31, 2023. New plans for the park are to feature a playground and splash pad in place of all of the rides except for the train ride which is part of the revised park.

== Former Rides ==
- Eli Bridge Lil Eli Wheel Ferris wheel
- Sellner Tilt-A-Whirl
- Eli Bridge Scrambler
- Butterfly
- Carousel
- Helicopters
- Car Carousel
- Space Shuttle
- Wildcat Mini Coaster
- Tubs of Fun
- Zamperla Mini Jets
