= WTA Oslo Open =

The Oslo Open was a women's professional tennis tournament held in Oslo, Norway. The event was part of the Women's Tennis Association (WTA) Tour and was played only once, in February 1991. It was classed as a Tier V event, and it was played on an indoor carpet surface. Catarina Lindqvist won the singles competition and Claudia Kohde-Kilsch and Silke Meier won the doubles; Raffaella Reggi finished runner-up in both events. There was a total prize money on offer of US$100,000. Tournament director was Ole Jacob Johansen.

== Past results ==
=== Singles ===
Year	Champion	Runner-up	Score
1991	(Sweden) Catarina Lindqvist	(Italy) Raffaella Reggi	6–3, 6–0

=== Doubles ===
Year	Champions	Runners-up	Score
1991	(Germany) Claudia Kohde-Kilsch (Germany) Silke Meier	(Belgium) Sabine Appelmans (Italy) Raffaella Reggi	3–6, 6–2, 6–4

== See also ==
- ATP Oslo Open
