= Birmingham International Indoor =

Defunct tennis tournament
- Event name: Birmingham International (1973-1975); Birmingham International Indoor Championships (1977); Birmingham International Indoor (1978-1980)
- Tour: USLTA Indoor Circuit (1973-1975); WCT Circuit (1977); ITF Grand Prix Circuit (1978-1980)
- Founded: 1973
- Abolished: 1980
- Editions: 8
- Location: Birmingham, Alabama, U.S.
- Surface: Carpet / indoor

The Birmingham International Indoor, was a men's tennis tournament played on indoor carpet courts in Birmingham, Alabama, United States. It was founded in 1973 as the Birmingham International and ran annually until 1980. The tournament was a part of the USLTA Indoor Circuit from 1973 through 1975, of the WCT Circuit series in 1977 and of the ITF Grand Prix Circuit from 1978 until the last edition in 1980. Jimmy Connors won the singles title six times out of the eight times the tournament was held.

== Finals ==
=== Singles ===
Year	Champions	Runners-up	Score
1973	(United States) Sandy Mayer	(United States) Charles Owens	6–4, 7–6
1974	(United States) Jimmy Connors	(United States) Sandy Mayer	7–5, 6–3
1975	(United States) Jimmy Connors	(United States) Billy Martin	6–4, 6–3
1976	(United States) Jimmy Connors	(United States) Roscoe Tanner	6–4, 3–6, 6–1
1977	(United States) Jimmy Connors	(United States) Bill Scanlon	6–3, 6–3
1978	(Sweden) Björn Borg	(United States) Dick Stockton	7–6, 7–5
1979	(United States) Jimmy Connors	(United States) Eddie Dibbs	6–2, 3–6, 7–5
1980	(United States) Jimmy Connors	(United States) Eliot Teltscher	6–3, 6–2

=== Doubles ===
Year	Champions	Runners-up	Score
1973	(South Africa) Pat Cramer (West Germany) Jürgen Fassbender	(United States) Clark Graebner (Romania) Ion Țiriac	6–4, 7–5
1974	(Australia) Ian Fletcher (United States) Sandy Mayer	(Greece) Nicholas Kalogeropoulos (Colombia) Iván Molina	4–6, 7–6, 6–1
1975	(West Germany) Jürgen Fassbender (West Germany) Karl Meiler	(Rhodesia) Colin Dowdeswell (South Africa) John Yuill	4–6, 6–3, 7–6
1976	(United States) Jimmy Connors (United States) Erik van Dillen	(United States) Hank Pfister (United States) Dennis Ralston	6–3, 6–2
1977	(Poland) Wojciech Fibak (Netherlands) Tom Okker	(United States) Billy Martin (United States) Bill Scanlon	6–3, 6–4
1978	(United States) Vitas Gerulaitis (United States) Sandy Mayer	(South Africa) Frew McMillan (United States) Dick Stockton	3–6, 6–1, 7–6
1979	(United States) Stan Smith (United States) Dick Stockton	(Romania) Ilie Năstase (Netherlands) Tom Okker	6–2, 6–3
1980	(Poland) Wojciech Fibak (Netherlands) Tom Okker	(Argentina) José Luis Clerc (Romania) Ilie Năstase	6–3, 6–3

== Event names ==
Official

- Birmingham International (1973-1975)
- Birmingham International Indoor Championships (1977)
- Birmingham International Indoor (1978-1980)

Tour

- ATP Birmingham (1973-1975, 1978-1980)
- WCT Birmingham (1976-1977)
