= ATP Oslo Open =

Oslo Open

Defunct tennis tournament
- Event name: Oslo Open
- Tour: Grand Prix circuit
- Founded: 1974
- Abolished: 1974
- Editions: 1
- Location: Oslo, Norway
- Surface: Hard / indoor

The Oslo Open is a defunct men's tennis tournament that was played on the Grand Prix tennis circuit in 1974. The event was held in Oslo, Norway and played on indoor hard courts. Jeff Borowiak won the singles title while Karl Meiler and Haroon Rahim partnered to win the doubles title.

== Finals ==
=== Singles ===
Year	Champion	Runner-up	Score
1974	(United States) Jeff Borowiak	(Germany) Karl Meiler	6–3, 6–2

=== Doubles ===
Year	Champion	Runner-up	Score
1974	(Germany) Karl Meiler (Pakistan) Haroon Rahim	(United States) Jeff Borowiak (United States) Vitas Gerulaitis	6–3, 6–2

== See also ==
- WTA Oslo Open
