= Aptos Open =

Defunct tennis tournament

The Aptos Open is a defunct tennis tournament that was played on the Grand Prix tennis circuit in 1973 was co-valid as the U.S. Hard Court Championships . The event was held in Aptos, California and was played on outdoor hard courts at the Seascape Racket Club. Jeff Austin won the singles title while Jeff Austin and Fred McNair partnered to win the doubles title.

== Past finals ==
=== Singles ===
Year	Champion	Runner-up	Score
1973	(United States) Jeff Austin	(New Zealand) Onny Parun	7–6, 6–4

=== Doubles ===
Year	Champion	Runner-up	Score
1973	(United States) Jeff Austin (United States) Fred McNair	(South Africa) Raymond Moore (New Zealand) Onny Parun	6–2, 6–1
