= 1975 US Open – Women's doubles =

Women's doubles
- 1975 US Open

Final
- Champion: (Australia) Margaret Court (United Kingdom) Virginia Wade
- Runner-up: (United States) Rosemary Casals (United States) Billie Jean King
- Score: 7–5, 2–6, 7–6

Details
- Draw: 32

Events
Singles	men	women		boys	girls
Doubles	men	women	mixed	boys	girls
WC Singles	men	women	quad
WC Doubles	men	women	quad
Legends	men	women	mixed
← 1974 ·	US Open	· 1976 →

Rosemary Casals and Billie Jean King were the defending champions but lost in the final 7–5, 2–6, 7–6 against Margaret Court and Virginia Wade. This was Court's 64th and final grand slam title across singles, doubles and mixed doubles, a record she holds to this day.

== Seeds ==
1. (United States) Chris Evert / (Czechoslovakia) Martina Navratilova (semifinals)
2. (France) Françoise Dürr / (Netherlands) Betty Stöve (semifinals)
3. (Australia) Margaret Court / (United Kingdom) Virginia Wade (champions)
4. (United States) Rosie Casals / (United States) Billie Jean King (finalists)

== Draw ==
=== Key ===
- Q = Qualifier
- WC = Wild card
- LL = Lucky loser
- Alt = Alternate
- SE = Special exempt
- PR = Protected ranking
- ITF = ITF entry
- JE = Junior exempt
- w/o = Walkover
- r = Retired
- d = Defaulted
- SR = Special ranking

=== Finals ===
Semifinals
1	(United States) Chris Evert (Czechoslovakia) Martina Navratilova	6	4	1
4	(United States) Rosie Casals (United States) Billie Jean King	3	6	6
3	(Australia) Margaret Court (United Kingdom) Virginia Wade	6	6
2	(France) Françoise Dürr (Netherlands) Betty Stöve	1	2

Final
4	(United States) Rosie Casals (United States) Billie Jean King	5	6	6
3	(Australia) Margaret Court (United Kingdom) Virginia Wade	7	2	7

=== Top half ===
First round
1	(United States) C Evert (Czechoslovakia) M Navratilova	6	6
(France) G Chanfreau (United States) J Heldman	2	4
(United Kingdom) L Charles (United Kingdom) S Mappin	7	7
(Uruguay) F Bonicelli (Colombia) I Fernández de Soto	6	6
(United Kingdom) S Barker (United Kingdom) G Coles	6	7
(United States) R Fox (United States) M Schallau	4	6
(Sweden) I Bentzer (Sweden) M Wikstedt	5	6	4
(United States) K Kemmer (United States) Sue Stap	7	4	6
4	(United States) R Casals (United States) BJ King	6	6
(United States) J Newberry (United States) P Teeguarden	3	2
(United States) J Evert (United States) Sandy Stap	1	1
(South Africa) L Boshoff (South Africa) I Kloss	6	6
(United States) A Kiyomura (Japan) K Sawamatsu	6	6
(United States) D Ganz (Belgium) M Gurdal	3	3
(United States) J Russell (United States) J Stratton	6	6
(South Africa) B Cuypers (Australia) H Gourlay	3	1

Second round
1	(United States) C Evert (Czechoslovakia) M Navratilova	6	2	6
(United Kingdom) L Charles (United Kingdom) S Mappin	4	6	2
(United Kingdom) S Barker (United Kingdom) G Coles	0	6	6
(United States) K Kemmer (United States) Sue Stap	6	1	4
4	(United States) R Casals (United States) BJ King	6	6
(South Africa) L Boshoff (South Africa) I Kloss	2	2
(United States) A Kiyomura (Japan) K Sawamatsu	3	3
(United States) J Russell (United States) J Stratton	6	6

Quarterfinals
1	(United States) C Evert (Czechoslovakia) M Navratilova	w/o
(United Kingdom) S Barker (United Kingdom) G Coles
4	(United States) R Casals (United States) BJ King	6	6
(United States) J Russell (United States) J Stratton	2	1

Semifinals
1	(United States) C Evert (Czechoslovakia) M Navratilova	6	4	1
4	(United States) R Casals (United States) BJ King	3	6	6

=== Bottom half ===
First round
(Australia) D Fromholtz (Czechoslovakia) R Tomanová	7	4	3
(Socialist Federal Republic of Yugoslavia) M Jaušovec (Romania) V Ruzici	6	6	6
(United States) W Overton (United States) V Ziegenfuss	2	2
(United States) J Anthony (Soviet Union) O Morozova	6	6
(United States) P Bostrom (United States) C Meyer	1	6	6
(Australia) L Hunt (United Kingdom) A Jones	6	4	4
(Australia) C Doerner (Australia) W Paish	3	0
3	(Australia) M Court (United Kingdom) V Wade	6	6
(United States) L duPont (Australia) W Turnbull	2	4
(United States) P Hogan (South Africa) G Stevens	6	6
(United Kingdom) L Beaven (United States) R Stark	5	0
(Australia) E Cawley (United States) P Michel	7	6
(Soviet Union) N Chmyreva (Soviet Union) M Kroschina	6	6	6
(Argentina) R Giscafré (Netherlands) T Zwaan	7	2	2
(Brazil) M Bueno (Czechoslovakia) R Maršíková	6	2
2	(France) F Dürr (Netherlands) B Stöve	7	6

Second round
(Socialist Federal Republic of Yugoslavia) M Jaušovec (Romania) V Ruzici	6	6
(United States) J Anthony (Soviet Union) O Morozova	7	7
(United States) P Bostrom (United States) C Meyer	5	1
3	(Australia) M Court (United Kingdom) V Wade	7	6
(United States) P Hogan (South Africa) G Stevens	5	6	6
(Australia) E Cawley (United States) P Michel	7	4	2
(Soviet Union) N Chmyreva (Soviet Union) M Kroschina	6	2	2
2	(France) F Dürr (Netherlands) B Stöve	3	6	6

Quarterfinals
(United States) J Anthony (Soviet Union) O Morozova	1	4
3	(Australia) M Court (United Kingdom) V Wade	6	6
(United States) P Hogan (South Africa) G Stevens	4	4
2	(France) F Dürr (Netherlands) B Stöve	6	6

Semifinals
3	(Australia) M Court (United Kingdom) V Wade	6	6
2	(France) F Dürr (Netherlands) B Stöve	1	2
