= 1974 Coliseum Mall International =

- Date: March 4–10
- Edition: 5th
- Category: USLTA Indoor circuit
- Draw: 39S / 11D
- Prize money: $35,000
- Surface: Carpet / indoor
- Location: Hampton, Virginia, United States
- Venue: Hampton Roads Coliseum

Champions

Singles
- (United States) Jimmy Connors

Doubles
- (Socialist Federal Republic of Yugoslavia) Željko Franulović / (Socialist Federal Republic of Yugoslavia) Nikola Pilić
- Hampton Grand Prix

The 1974 Coliseum Mall International, also known as the Hampton Indoor, was a men's tennis tournament played on indoor carpet courts at the Hampton Roads Coliseum in Hampton, Virginia in the United States that was part of the 1974 USLTA Indoor Circuit. It was the fifth edition of the tournament and was held from March 4 through March 10, 1974. First-seeded player Jimmy Connors won his second consecutive singles title and earned $10,000 first-prize money.

== Finals ==
=== Singles ===
(United States) Jimmy Connors defeated (Romania) Ilie Năstase 6–4, 6–4

- It was Connors' 6th singles title of the year and the 23rd of his career.

=== Doubles ===
(Socialist Federal Republic of Yugoslavia) Željko Franulović / (Socialist Federal Republic of Yugoslavia) Nikola Pilić defeated (South Africa) Pat Cramer / (United States) Mike Estep 6–3, 1–2, retired
