= Roanoke International Tennis Tournament =

Defunct tennis tournament
- Event name: Roanoke International Tennis Tournament; Roanoke Invitational Tennis Tournament
- Tour: USLTA Indoor Circuit
- Founded: 1972
- Abolished: 1975
- Editions: 4
- Location: Roanoke, Virginia, US
- Venue: Roanoke Civic Center
- Surface: Carpet / indoor

The Roanoke International Tennis Tournament was a men's tennis tournament played on indoor carpet courts at the Roanoke Civic Center in Roanoke, Virginia in the United States. The event was part of the USLTA Indoor Circuit and was held from 1972 until 1975. Jimmy Connors won three of the four editions.

== Past finals ==
=== Singles ===
Year	Champion	Runner-up	Score
1972	(United States) Jimmy Connors	(Czechoslovakia) Vladimír Zedník	6–4, 7–6
1973	(United States) Jimmy Connors	(Australia) Ian Fletcher	6–2, 6–3
1974	(United States) Jimmy Connors	(West Germany) Karl Meiler	6–4, 6–3
1975	(United Kingdom) Roger Taylor	(United States) Vitas Gerulaitis	7–6, 7–6

=== Doubles ===
Year	Champion	Runner-up	Score
1972	(United States) Jimmy Connors (Pakistan) Haroon Rahim	(New Zealand) Ian Crookenden (Czechoslovakia) Vladimír Zedník	6–4, 3–6, 6–3
1973	(United States) Jimmy Connors (Spain) Juan Gisbert Sr.	(Australia) Ian Fletcher (United States) Butch Seewagen	6–0, 7–6
1974	(United States) Vitas Gerulaitis (United States) Sandy Mayer	(New Zealand) Ian Crookenden (New Zealand) Jeff Simpson	7–6, 6–1
1975	(United States) Vitas Gerulaitis (United States) Sandy Mayer	(Spain) Juan Gisbert Sr. (Romania) Ion Țiriac	7–6, 1–6, 6–3
