= 1976 Coliseum Mall International =

- Date: March 10–14
- Edition: 7th
- Category: USLTA-IPA Indoor circuit
- Draw: 16S
- Prize money: $50,000
- Surface: Carpet / indoor
- Location: Hampton, Virginia, United States
- Venue: Hampton Roads Coliseum

Champions

Singles
- (United States) Jimmy Connors
- Hampton Grand Prix

The 1976 Coliseum Mall International, also known as the Hampton Indoor, was a men's tennis tournament played on indoor carpet courts at the Hampton Roads Coliseum in Hampton, Virginia in the United States that was part of the 1976 USLTA-IPA Indoor Circuit. It was the seventh edition of the tournament and was held from March 10 through March 14, 1976. In contrast to previous editions no doubles event was held and the draw for the singles event was reduced from 32 to 16 players. First-seeded player Jimmy Connors won his fourth consecutive singles title and earned $15,000 first-prize money.

== Finals ==
=== Singles ===
(United States) Jimmy Connors defeated (Romania) Ilie Năstase 6–2, 6–2, 6–2

- It was Connors' 3rd singles title of the year and the 44th of his career.
