= Omaha Open =

Defunct tennis tournament
- Event name: Omaha International; Midlands International
- Tour: USLTA Indoor Circuit
- Founded: 1969
- Abolished: 1974
- Editions: 6
- Location: Omaha, Nebraska, US
- Venue: Omaha Civic Auditorium
- Surface: Carpet / indoor

The Omaha Open, also known as the Midlands International Indoor, was a men's tennis tournament founded in 1969 as the Omaha International Indoor. It was played in Omaha, Nebraska, until 1974. The event was part of the USLTA Indoor Circuit and was held on indoor carpet courts at the City Auditorium. The tournament was canceled in March 1975, less than three weeks before the scheduled start of its seventh edition because the participation of top players could no be guaranteed.

== Finals ==
=== Singles ===
Year	Champions	Runners-up	Score
1969	(United States) Cliff Richey	(Mexico) Joaquín Loyo-Mayo	6–4, 6–2
1970	(United States) Stan Smith	(United States) Jim Osborne	6–2, 7–5, 6–3
1971	(Romania) Ilie Năstase	(United States) Cliff Richey	6–4, 6–3, 6–1
1972	(Romania) Ilie Năstase	(Romania) Ion Țiriac	2–6, 6–0, 6–1
1973	(Romania) Ilie Năstase	(United States) Jimmy Connors	5–0, ret.
1974	(Germany) Karl Meiler	(United States) Jimmy Connors	6–3, 1–6, 6–1

=== Doubles ===
Year	Champions	Runners-up	Score
1969	(United States) Cliff Richey (United States) Tom Edlefsen	(United Kingdom) Mark Cox (United States) Jim McManus	7–5, 6–3
1970	(United States) Stan Smith (United States) Bob Lutz	(Romania) Ilie Năstase (Romania) Ion Țiriac	6–4, 6–4
1971	(United States) Clark Graebner (Brazil) Thomaz Koch	(United States) Jim McManus (United States) Jim Osborne	6–4, 4–6, 6–4
1972	(Romania) Ilie Năstase (Romania) Ion Țiriac	(Spain) Andrés Gimeno (Spain) Manuel Orantes	5–7, 6–4, 7–6
1973	(United States) William Brown (United States) Mike Estep	(United States) Jimmy Connors (Spain) Juan Gisbert, Sr.	DEF
1974	(Germany) Jürgen Fassbender (Germany) Karl Meiler	(Australia) Ian Fletcher (Australia) Kim Warwick	6–2, 6–4
