= Arkansas International Tennis Tournament =

Defunct tennis tournament
- Event name: Fairfield Bay Classic; Little Rock Open
- Tour: USLTA Indoor Circuit (1974–1976); Grand Prix (1977–1979)
- Founded: 1974
- Abolished: 1979
- Editions: 6
- Location: North Little Rock, Arkansas; United States
- Venue: Burns Park
- Surface: Carpet (indoor); Hard (indoor)

The Arkansas International Tennis Tournament was a men's tennis tournament played at Burns Park in North Little Rock, Arkansas in the United States from 1974 to 1979. The event was part of the Grand Prix tennis circuit from 1977 through 1979 and was played on indoor carpet courts. From 1977 onward the tournament was also known under its sponsored name Fairfield Bay Classic.

== Past finals ==
=== Singles ===
| Year | Champion | Runner-up | Score |
|---|---|---|---|
| 1974 | (United States) Jimmy Connors | (West Germany) Karl Meiler | 6–2, 6–1 |
| 1975 | (United States) Billy Martin | (United States) George Hardie | 6–2, 7–6^{(5–4)} |
| 1976 | (Pakistan) Haroon Rahim | (Australia) Colin Dibley | 6–4, 7–5 |
| 1977 | (United States) Sandy Mayer | (Pakistan) Haroon Rahim | 6–2, 6–4 |
| 1978 | (United States) Dick Stockton | (United States) Hank Pfister | 6–4, 3–5, ret. (Note: Pfister retired with a sprained ankle.) |
| 1979 | (United States) Vitas Gerulaitis | (United States) Butch Walts | 6–2, 6–2 |

=== Doubles ===
| Year | Champion | Runner-up | Score |
|---|---|---|---|
| 1974 | (West Germany) Jürgen Fassbender (West Germany) Karl Meiler | (United States) Vitas Gerulaitis (South Africa) Bob Hewitt | 6–0, 6–2 |
| 1975 | (Mexico) Marcello Lara (Australia) Barry Phillips-Moore | (United States) Jeff Austin (United States) Charles Owens | 6–4, 6–3 |
| 1976 | (Australia) Syd Ball (Australia) Ray Ruffels | (Paraguay) Giuliano Pecci (Pakistan) Haroon Rahim | 6–3, 6–7, 6–3 |
| 1977 | (Australia) Colin Dibley (Pakistan) Haroon Rahim | (South Africa) Bob Hewitt (South Africa) Frew McMillan | 6–7, 6–3, 6–3 |
| 1978 | (Australia) Colin Dibley (Australia) Geoff Masters | (United States) Tim Gullikson (United States) Tom Gullikson | 7–6, 6–3 |
| 1979 | (United States) Vitas Gerulaitis (Czechoslovakia) Vladimír Zedník | (Australia) Phil Dent (Australia) Colin Dibley | 5–7, 6–3, 7–5 |
