= Ian Crookenden =

Tennis player from New Zealand

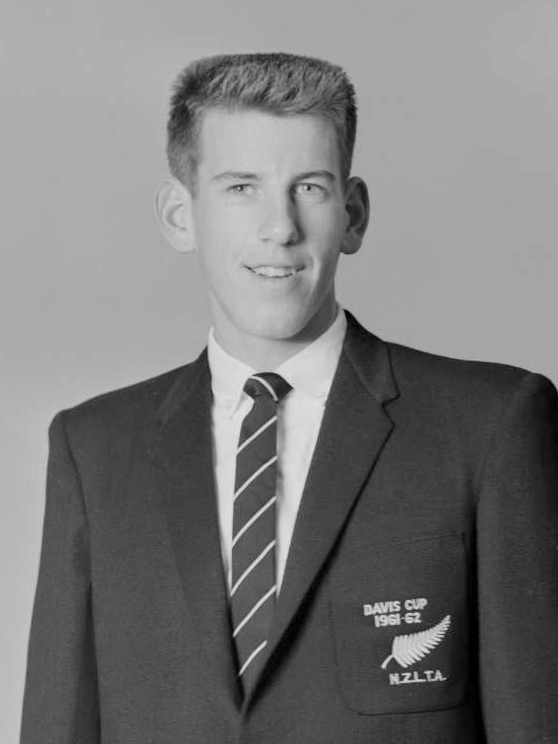
- Crookenden as a member of the 1962 New Zealand Davis Cup team
- Full name: Ian Sinclair Crookenden
- Country (sports): New Zealand
- Born: 10 December 1943 (age 81); Lower Hutt, Wellington
- Plays: Left-handed

Singles
- Career record: 23–40
- Career titles: 0

Grand Slam singles results
- French Open: 2R (1963)
- Wimbledon: 3R (1962)
- US Open: 4R (1966)

Doubles
- Career record: 15–27
- Career titles: 1

Grand Slam doubles results
- Wimbledon: SF (1964)
- US Open: 3R (1968)

Ian Sinclair Crookenden (born 10 December 1943) is a former professional tennis player from New Zealand. Crookenden currently serves as the Head Men's and Women's Coach at Saint Joseph's University. He is a member of the Intercollegiate Tennis Hall of Fame.

== Biography ==
Crookenden first represented the New Zealand Davis Cup team in 1962, for a tie against Denmark in Copenhagen. It came soon after he had finished runner-up to Rod Laver at the 1962 British Hard Court Championships in Bournemouth. He also competed at the French Championships and Wimbledon that year, making the third round of the latter.

In 1963 he won the Newport Casino Invitational and also finished runner-up in the All England Plate.

He played collegiate tennis in the United States for UCLA from 1963 to 1967 and won two NCAA Division I doubles titles. In 1965, his third year, he was a member of the championship winning team. He also partnered Arthur Ashe to win the NCAA doubles title, then in 1966 claimed the doubles again, to become the second UCLA player to achieve this feat. On this occasion he teamed up with Charlie Pasarell. His final year in 1967 was served as captain and he steered UCLA to second place in the championships. He earned All-American selection in each of his last three seasons.

During his time at UCLA he continued to represent the New Zealand Davis Cup team in international competition. He made his last Davis Cup appearance in the 1965 competition and finished with a 4/9 record from five ties.

Crookenden reached the fourth round of the 1966 U.S. National Championships, which was the furthest he went in singles at a Grand Slam tournament. He did however make the semi-finals in men's doubles with countryman Lew Gerrard at the 1964 Wimbledon Championships.

He continued competing professionally in the 1970s in both singles and doubles events. His best singles performances were semi-final appearances at Grand Prix tournaments in the Omaha Open and Calgary Indoor in 1974. He also won a set against world number one Jimmy Connors when they met in a Washington quarter-final that year. In doubles he won one Grand Prix title, at Hampton in 1975, with Ian Fletcher.

A coaching pro for many years, Crookenden joined Wake Forest University in 1984 as the head men's tennis coach and indoor tennis club director, a role he held for 12 years. From 1997 to 2008 he served as director of tennis at the Philadelphia Cricket Club. He returned to collegiate tennis in 2008 when he was appointed head coach of the tennis programs at Saint Joseph's University.

== Grand Prix career finals ==
=== Doubles: 3 (1–2) ===
Result	W–L	Date	Tournament	Surface	Partner	Opponents	Score
Loss	0–1	Jan 1972	Roanoke, U. S.	Carpet	(Czechoslovakia) Vladimír Zedník	(United States) Jimmy Connors (Pakistan) Haroon Rahim	4–6, 6–3, 3–6
Loss	0–2	Jan 1974	Roanoke, U. S.	Carpet	(New Zealand) Jeff Simpson	(United States) Vitas Gerulaitis (United States) Sandy Mayer	6–7, 1–6
Win	1–2	Mar 1975	Hampton, U. S.	Carpet	(Australia) Ian Fletcher	(West Germany) Karl Meiler (Czechoslovakia) Jan Písecký	6–2, 6–7, 6–4

== See also ==
- List of New Zealand Davis Cup team representatives
