= Baltimore International =

Baltimore

Defunct tennis tournament
- Tour: USLTA Indoor Circuit (1972–1976); Grand Prix Circuit (1977, 1979–1980); WCT Tour (1982)
- Founded: 1972
- Abolished: 1982
- Editions: 10
- Location: Baltimore, Maryland, U.S.
- Venue: Towson State College
- Surface: Carpet / indoor

The Baltimore International was a men's tennis tournament played at the Towson State College in Baltimore, Maryland from 1972 until 1980 and in 1982. The event was part of the USLTA-IPA Indoor Circuit from 1972 through 1976. In 1977, 1979 and 1980 it was an event on the Grand Prix Circuit and in its final year, 1982, it formed part of the WCT Tour. The tournament was played on indoor carpet courts.

== Finals ==
=== Singles ===
Year	Champions	Runners-up	Score
1972	(Romania) Ilie Năstase	(United States) Jimmy Connors	1–6, 6–4, 7–6^{(5–1)}
1973	(United States) Jimmy Connors	(United States) Sandy Mayer	6–4, 7–5
1974	(United States) Sandy Mayer	(United States) Clark Graebner	6–2, 6–1
1975	(United States) Brian Gottfried	(Australia) Allan Stone	3–6, 6–2, 6–3
1976	(United States) Tom Gorman	(Romania) Ilie Năstase	7–5, 6–3
1977	(United States) Brian Gottfried	(Argentina) Guillermo Vilas	6–3, 7–6
1978	(South Africa) Cliff Drysdale	(United States) Tom Gorman	7–5, 6–3
1979	(United States) Harold Solomon	(United States) Marty Riessen	7–5, 6–4
1980	(United States) Harold Solomon	(United States) Tim Gullikson	7–6, 6–0
1981	Not held		
1982	(Australia) Paul McNamee	(Argentina) Guillermo Vilas	4–6, 7–5, 7–5, 2–6, 6–3

=== Doubles ===
Year	Champions	Runners-up	Score
1972	(United States) Jimmy Connors (Pakistan) Haroon Rahim	(France) Pierre Barthès (United States) Clark Graebner	6–3, 3–6, 6–3
1973	(United States) Jimmy Connors (United States) Clark Graebner	(United States) Paul Gerken (United States) Sandy Mayer	3–6, 6–2, 6–3
1974	(Germany) Jürgen Fassbender (Germany) Karl Meiler	(Australia) Owen Davidson (United States) Clark Graebner	7–6, 7–5
1975	(Australia) Dick Crealy (Australia) Ray Ruffels	(Egypt) Ismail El Shafei (South Africa) Frew McMillan	6–4, 6–3
1976	(South Africa) Bob Hewitt (South Africa) Frew McMillan	(Romania) Ilie Năstase (United States) Cliff Richey	3–6, 7–6, 6–4
1977	(Romania) Ion Țiriac (Argentina) Guillermo Vilas	(Australia) Ross Case (Czech Republic) Jan Kodeš	6–3, 6–7, 6–4
1978	(South Africa) Frew McMillan (United States) Fred McNair	(United Kingdom) Roger Taylor (Italy) Antonio Zugarelli	6–3, 7–5
1979	(United States) Marty Riessen (United States) Sherwood Stewart	(India) Anand Amritraj (South Africa) Cliff Drysdale	7–6, 6–4
1980	(United States) Tim Gullikson (United States) Marty Riessen	(United States) Brian Gottfried (South Africa) Frew McMillan	2–6, 6–3, 6–4
1981	Not held		
1982	(India) Anand Amritraj (United States) Tony Giammalva	(India) Vijay Amritraj (Australia) Fred Stolle	7–5, 6–2
