= Jeff Austin (tennis) =

American tennis player and sports agent (born 1951)

- Country (sports): United States
- Residence: Rolling Hills, California
- Born: July 5, 1951 (age 75) Boston, Massachusetts, U.S.
- Plays: Right-handed

Singles
- Career record: 51–73
- Career titles: 1
- Highest ranking: No. 52 (October 15, 1973)

Grand Slam singles results
- Wimbledon: 3R (1973)
- US Open: 2R (1971, 1975)

Doubles
- Career record: 41–58
- Career titles: 1

Grand Slam doubles results
- Wimbledon: 3R (1973, 1975)
- US Open: 3R (1975)

William Jeffrey Austin (born July 5, 1951) is an American former professional tennis player.

== Tennis career ==
Austin, an All-American on four occasions, played tennis for the UCLA Bruins and was a member of their 1970 and 1971 NCAA Championship winning teams.

Austin made the third round at the 1973 Wimbledon Championships, where he lost to Szabolcs Baranyi, despite winning the first two sets.

In 1971, he defeated Zan Guerry and William Brown to reach the round of 16 at the Cincinnati Open, in his first of five appearances in Cincinnati.

In 1973, he won both the singles and doubles titles at the Aptos Open. In 1974, Austin, along with his sister Pam, was a member of the World Team Tennis champion Denver Racquets.

== Personal life ==
Austin's sister is two-time US Open champion Tracy Austin and he is also the brother of Doug, John and Pam Austin, all tennis players.

He married fitness instructor Denise Katnich on April 30, 1983. They have two daughters.

== Career after tennis ==
Austin now works as a sports agent. He is head of the basketball division at the Octagon.

== Grand Prix career finals ==
=== Singles: 1 (1–0) ===
Result	W-L	Date	Tournament	Surface	Opponent	Score
Win	1–0	Sep 1973	Aptos, US	Hard	(New Zealand) Onny Parun	7–6, 6–4

=== Doubles: 2 (1–1) ===
Result	W-L	Date	Tournament	Surface	Partner	Opponents	Score
Win	1–0	Sep 1973	Aptos, US	Hard	(United States) Fred McNair	(South Africa) Raymond Moore (New Zealand) Onny Parun	6–2, 6–1
Loss	1–1	Feb 1975	Little Rock, US	Carpet	(United States) Charles Owens	(Mexico) Marcelo Lara (Australia) Barry Phillips-Moore	4–6, 3–6
