= 1975 US Open (tennis) =

- Date: August 27 – September 7
- Edition: 95th
- Category: Grand Slam (ITF)
- Surface: Clay / outdoor
- Location: Forest Hills, Queens, United States
- Venue: West Side Tennis Club

Champions

Men's singles
- (Spain) Manuel Orantes

Women's singles
- (United States) Chris Evert

Men's doubles
- (United States) Jimmy Connors / (Romania) Ilie Năstase

Women's doubles
- (Australia) Margaret Court / (United Kingdom) Virginia Wade

Mixed doubles
- (United States) Rosemary Casals / (United States) Dick Stockton
- US Open

The 1975 US Open was a tennis tournament that took place on the outdoor clay courts at the West Side Tennis Club in Forest Hills, Queens, in New York City, New York. The tournament was held from August 27 until September 7, 1975. It was the 95th staging of the US Open, and the fourth Grand Slam tennis event of 1975. During the final three years at the Forest Hills location, 1975-1977, the US Open was played on a green-colored Har-Tru clay surface, a surface slightly harder and faster than red clay. The switch came after player complaints about the poor state and uneven ball bounce on the grass courts in Forest Hills. The tie-break scoring system changed in this championship. Previously a sudden death point was played at 4–4 with the winner the first to 5 points. It changed to the 13 point tie-break first to 7 points or the first player to win by two clear points if the scores reached 6–6.

== Seniors ==
=== Men's singles ===
(Spain) Manuel Orantes defeated (United States) Jimmy Connors, 6–4, 6–3, 6–3

- It was Orantes's only career Grand Slam title.

=== Women's singles ===
(United States) Chris Evert defeated (Australia) Evonne Goolagong, 5–7, 6–4, 6–2

- It was Evert's 4th career Grand Slam title, and her 1st US Open title.

=== Men's doubles ===
(United States) Jimmy Connors / (Romania) Ilie Năstase defeated (Netherlands) Tom Okker / (United States) Marty Riessen, 6–4, 7–6

=== Women's doubles ===
(Australia) Margaret Court / (United Kingdom) Virginia Wade defeated (United States) Rosemary Casals / (United States) Billie Jean King, 7–5, 2–6, 7–6

=== Mixed doubles ===
(United States) Rosemary Casals / (United States) Dick Stockton defeated (United States) Billie Jean King / (Australia) Fred Stolle, 6-3, 6-7, 6-3

== Juniors ==
=== Boys' singles ===
(United States) Howard Schoenfield defeated (New Zealand) Chris Lewis, 6–4, 6–3

=== Girls' singles ===
(Soviet Union) Natasha Chmyreva defeated (South Africa) Greer Stevens, 6–7, 6–2, 6–2

Preceded by 1975 Wimbledon Championships	Grand Slams	Succeeded by 1976 Australian Open
