= Ian Fletcher (tennis) =

Australian tennis player

- Country (sports): Australia
- Residence: Naples, Florida, U.S.
- Born: 1 December 1948 (age 77) Adelaide, Australia
- Turned pro: 1968
- Plays: Right-handed

Singles
- Career record: 107–111
- Highest ranking: No. 56 (3 June 1974)

Grand Slam singles results
- Australian Open: 2R (1968, 1972, 1974)
- French Open: 4R (1972)
- Wimbledon: 4R (1972)
- US Open: 2R (1973, 1974)

Doubles
- Career record: 72–61
- Career titles: 3

Grand Slam doubles results
- Australian Open: SF (1974)
- French Open: 4R (1970)
- Wimbledon: 3R (1971)
- US Open: 3R (1973)

Ian Fletcher (born 1 December 1948) is an Australian former professional tennis player. Fletcher won three career Grand Prix doubles titles and reached a career-high singles ranking of world No. 56 in June 1974. He reached the fourth round in singles at the 1972 French Open and Wimbledon. He later worked as a club professional in Massachusetts, before retiring to Florida.

== Tennis career ==
Born in Adelaide, Australia, Fletcher achieved his peak domestic ranking of No. 6 in Australia in 1971. He won regional singles titles at the Tokyo Indoor Championships and the Malaysian Championships in 1971, followed by titles in Tel Aviv and Haifa, Israel, in 1972.

His best Grand Slam singles performance came at the 1972 French Open, where he played at Roland Garros and after defeating American Steve Turner, John Paish of Great Britain, Croatian Željko Franulović, and François Jauffret of France, reached the round of 16 where he lost to Patrick Proisy of France. He also reached the third round of Wimbledon in 1974 before falling to Ilie Năstase.

In doubles, Fletcher won three career titles and reached the semifinals of the 1974 Australian Open alongside partner Allan Stone.

Following his retirement from professional tennis, he relocated to the United States and resides in Naples, Florida.

== Career finals ==
=== Doubles (3 wins, 3 losses) ===
Result	W/L	Date	Tournament	Surface	Partner	Opponents	Score
Loss	0–1	Jan 1973	Roanoke, U.S.	Hard	(United States) Butch Seewagen	(United States) Jimmy Connors (Spain) Juan Gisbert, Sr.	0–6, 6–7
Win	1–1	Nov 1973	Djakarta, Indonesia	Hard	(United States) Mike Estep	(Australia) John Newcombe (Australia) Allan Stone	7–5, 6–4
Loss	1–2	Jan 1974	Omaha, U.S.		(Australia) Kim Warwick	(West Germany) Jürgen Fassbender (West Germany) Karl Meiler	2–6, 4–6
Win	2–2	Feb 1974	Birmingham, U.S.	Carpet	(United States) Sandy Mayer	(Greece) Nicholas Kalogeropoulos (Colombia) Iván Molina	4–6, 7–6, 6–1
Loss	2–3	Mar 1974	Tempe, U.S.	Hard	(Australia) Kim Warwick	(West Germany) Jürgen Fassbender (West Germany) Karl Meiler	6–4, 4–6, 5–7
Win	3–3	Mar 1975	Hampton, U.S.	Carpet	(New Zealand) Ian Crookenden	(West Germany) Karl Meiler (Czechoslovakia) Jan Písecký	6–2, 6–7, 6–4

== Post-retirement and coaching ==
After retiring from the tour and moving to the United States, Fletcher served for 23 years as the Head Tennis Professional at The Thoreau Club in Concord, Massachusetts. His son, Dylan Fletcher, also became a college player and coach. Fletcher later relocated to Naples, Florida.
