= Jan Písecký =

Czech tennis player (born 1951)

- Full name: Jan Písecký
- Country (sports): Czechoslovakia
- Born: 15 May 1951 (age 74); Prague, Czechoslovakia

Singles
- Career record: 20–23
- Career titles: 0
- Highest ranking: No. 112 (2 June 1975)

Grand Slam singles results
- French Open: 2R (1974)
- Wimbledon: 1R (1975)

Doubles
- Career record: 14–19
- Career titles: 0

Grand Slam doubles results
- French Open: 2R (1975)
- Wimbledon: 2R (1975)

Mixed doubles

Grand Slam mixed doubles results
- French Open: QF (1974)

Jan Písecký (born 15 May 1951) is a former professional tennis player from the Czech Republic.

== Biography ==
Písecký, who was born in Prague, was a Czechoslovak Davis Cup squad member, without featuring in a tie.

He competed professionally in the 1970s and had early success at his home tournament in Prague where he made the semi-finals in 1973, with wins over Péter Szőke, Roscoe Tanner and František Pála.

In the 1974 French Open he reached the second round of the singles and was a quarter-finalist in the mixed doubles partnering Renáta Tomanová. He appeared in two further main singles draw of Grand Slam tournaments, the French Open and Wimbledon Championships in 1975, for a first round exit in both, to Jairo Velasco and Phil Dent respectively.

His only Grand Prix final came at Hampton in 1975, in the doubles event. He and partner Karl Meiler lost the final to Ian Crookenden and Ian Fletcher.

== Grand Prix career finals ==
=== Doubles: 1 (0–1) ===
Result	W/L	Date	Tournament	Surface	Partner	Opponents	Score
Loss	0–1	Mar 1975	Hampton, U. S.	Carpet	(West Germany) Karl Meiler	(New Zealand) Ian Crookenden (Australia) Ian Fletcher	2–6, 7–6, 4–6
