= Burns Park (North Little Rock, Arkansas) =

Park in North Little Rock, Arkansas

Coordinates: 34°47′49″N 92°18′38″W

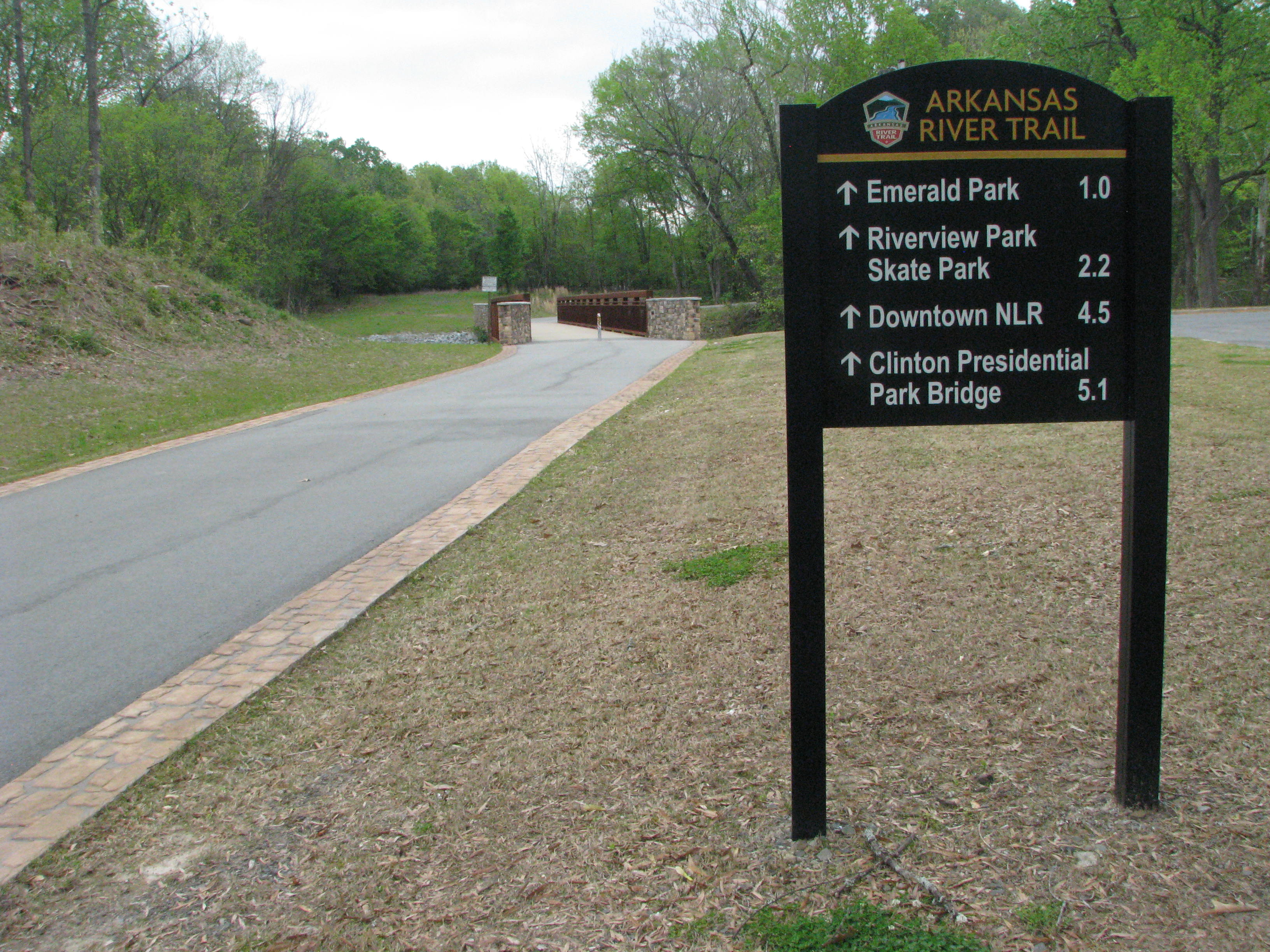
Burns Park

Burns Park is a 1,700-acre (690 ha) park in North Little Rock, Arkansas. The park features two golf courses, Funland Amusement Park, sports facilities and a camping area.

== History ==
About 6,000 acres of land in North Little Rock, Arkansas (at the time called Argenta) were purchased by the United States government between 1900 and 1915. It was used as a training camp for soldiers during World War I called Camp Pike. Fox holes and other remnants of the camp can still be found along the trails and other areas of the park. In 1937, Camp Pike was renamed Camp Robinson and expanded to 48,188 acres during World War II. Camp Robinson was used for basic training and housing prisoners of war. After the war Camp Robinson was declared surplus and the land was divided and sold.

A local doctor named William Burns started a drive to buy the land and was granted 20,000 dollars to buy the area for a park. He helped build pavilions, roads, trails, and a lake. In 1950, the park was named Burns Park after him.

== Park amenities ==
17 Soccer Fields; Fishing lake; 2 - 1 acre off-leash dog parks; 22 Tennis Courts; 2 - 18 hole golf courses; 2 - 18 hole disc golf courses; 1 - 9 hole disc golf course; numerous playgrounds, picnic areas, pavilions; 3 outdoor basketball courts; Softball complex (5 fields); Youth Baseball complex (7 fields); RV Camping (52 sites); Archery Range; Amusement Park (Funland); 15 miles of natural surface multi-use trails; 6 miles of paved multi-use trails; Covered Bridge; Union Pacific Caboose; World War II Tank; Old Log Cabin; Boat launch to the Arkansas River

=== Tornado damage ===
On March 31, 2023, a tornado formed and moved through the area, causing extensive damage to the park's trees, its baseball field, recently expanded amusement park, and other buildings. It was estimated that the park lost about 10,000 trees from the tornado. Burns Park was closed indefinitely as storm recovery was underway.
