= Charles Owens (tennis) =

American tennis player

- Country (sports): United States
- Born: July 31, 1950 (age 76) Tuscaloosa, Alabama
- Plays: Right-handed

Singles
- Career record: 55–76
- Career titles: 0
- Highest ranking: No. 36 (March 5, 1975)

Grand Slam singles results
- Wimbledon: 3R (1975)
- US Open: 3R (1973, 1974)

Doubles
- Career record: 51–63
- Career titles: 0
- Highest ranking: No. 105 (March 1, 1976)

Grand Slam doubles results
- Wimbledon: 3R (1975)
- US Open: 3R (1972, 1974, 1975)
Medal record
Representing United States
Summer Universiade
| Bronze medal – third place | 1970 Turin | Men's doubles |
| Bronze medal – third place | 1970 Turin | Mixed doubles |

Charles "Charlie" Owens (born July 31, 1950) is a former professional tennis player from the United States.

== Career ==
Owens won the Orange Bowl in 1966 for the 16 and under age division.

He competed at the 1970 Summer Universiade in Turin, where he won bronze medals in both the men's doubles (with Fred McNair) and mixed doubles (with Mona Schallau).

In 1972, he was the NCAA Division II champion for Samford University.

He made the third round of the singles event at the US Open in 1973 and 1974 as well as the third round of Wimbledon in 1975. In doubles, he and partner Mike Estep beat third seeds Arthur Ashe and Roscoe Tanner en route to the third round at the 1974 US Open.

== Grand Prix career finals ==
=== Singles: 1 (0–1) ===
| Result | W-L | Date | Tournament | Surface | Opponent | Score |
|---|---|---|---|---|---|---|
| Loss | 0–1 | Jan 1973 | Birmingham, United States | Hard | (United States) Sandy Mayer | 7–5, 6–0 |

=== Doubles: 2 (0–2) ===
| Result | W-L | Date | Tournament | Surface | Partner | Opponents | Score |
|---|---|---|---|---|---|---|---|
| Loss | 0–1 | Feb 1975 | Little Rock, United States | Carpet (i) | (United States) Jeff Austin | (Mexico) Marcelo Lara (Australia) Barry Phillips-Moore | 4–6, 3–6 |
| Loss | 0–2 | Nov 1979 | Bogotá, Colombia | Clay | (United States) Bruce Nichols | (Mexico) Emilio Montaño (Colombia) Jairo Velasco | 2–6, 4–6 |
