= Hampton Grand Prix =

Defunct tennis tournament
- Event name: Hampton Grand Prix; National Indoor Championships; Coliseum Mall International
- Tour: USLTA indoor circuit Grand Prix circuit
- Founded: 1970
- Abolished: 1977
- Editions: 8
- Location: Hampton, Virginia, U.S.
- Venue: Hampton Institute (1970); Hampton Coliseum (1971–1977)
- Surface: Carpet (indoor)

The Hampton Grand Prix is a defunct men's tennis tournament played from 1970 to 1977. The first edition was held at the Hampton Institute in Hampton, Virginia in the United States and subsequent editions were held at the Hampton Coliseum. All editions were played on indoor carpet courts.

The first seven editions were part of the USLTA Winter Indoor circuit, organized by Bill Riordan. The 1972 edition was also part of the Grand Prix tennis circuit. When the USLTA circuit was abolished after 1976 the tournament became part of the Grand Prix tennis circuit its final edition in 1977.

Jimmy Connors and Ilie Năstase were the most successful players at the tournament, with Connors winning the singles competition four times while Năstase won the singles title once and the doubles title three times, twice with compatriot Ion Țiriac and once with American Clark Graebner.

== Past finals ==
=== Singles ===
Year	Champions	Runners-up	Score
1970	(United States) Stan Smith	(Brazil) Thomaz Koch	6–3, 6–2, 7–5
1971	(Romania) Ilie Năstase	(United States) Clark Graebner	7–5, 6–4, 7–6
1972	(United States) Stan Smith	(Romania) Ilie Năstase	6–3, 6–2, 6–7, 6–4
1973	(United States) Jimmy Connors	(Romania) Ilie Năstase	4–6, 6–3, 7–5, 6–3
1974	(United States) Jimmy Connors	(Romania) Ilie Năstase	6–4, 6–4
1975	(United States) Jimmy Connors	(Czechoslovakia) Jan Kodeš	3–6, 6–3, 6–0
1976	(United States) Jimmy Connors	(Romania) Ilie Năstase	6–2, 6–2, 6–2
1977	(United States) Sandy Mayer	(United States) Stan Smith	4–6, 6–3, 6–2, 1–6, 6–3

=== Doubles ===
Year	Champions	Runners-up	Score
1971	(Romania) Ilie Năstase (Romania) Ion Țiriac	(United States) Clark Graebner (Brazil) Thomaz Koch	6–4, 4–6, 7–5
1972	(Romania) Ilie Năstase (Romania) Ion Țiriac	(Spain) Andrés Gimeno (Spain) Manuel Orantes	6–4, 7–6
1973	(United States) Clark Graebner (Romania) Ilie Năstase	(United States) Jimmy Connors (Romania) Ion Țiriac	6–2, 6–1
1974	(Socialist Federal Republic of Yugoslavia) Željko Franulović (Socialist Federal Republic of Yugoslavia) Nikola Pilić	(South Africa) Pat Cramer (United States) Mike Estep	6–3, 1–2, RET.
1975	(New Zealand) Ian Crookenden (Australia) Ian Fletcher	(West Germany) Karl Meiler (Czechoslovakia) Jan Písecký	6–2, 6–7^{(3–5)}, 6–4
1976	Not held		
1977	(United States) Sandy Mayer (United States) Stan Smith	(Australia) Paul Kronk (Australia) Cliff Letcher	6–4, 6–3
