= Sandy Mayer =

American tennis player

- Full name: Alexander Mayer
- Country (sports): United States
- Residence: Portola Valley, California, U.S.
- Born: April 5, 1952 (age 74) Flushing, New York, U.S.
- Height: 5 ft 10 in (1.78 m)
- Turned pro: 1972
- Retired: 1986
- Plays: Right-handed (one-handed backhand)
- Prize money: $1,057,783

Singles
- Career record: 363–196
- Career titles: 11
- Highest ranking: No. 7 (April 26, 1982)

Grand Slam singles results
- Australian Open: 2R (1980)
- French Open: 3R (1979, 1981)
- Wimbledon: SF (1973)
- US Open: 4R (1972)

Other tournaments
- WCT Finals: QF (1981)

Doubles
- Career record: 292–136
- Career titles: 24
- Highest ranking: No. 3 (January 28, 1985)

Grand Slam doubles results
- Australian Open: QF (1980)
- French Open: W (1979)
- Wimbledon: W (1975)
- US Open: 3R (1983, 1984)

Alexander Mayer (born April 5, 1952) is a former tennis player from the United States. He won twelve titles in singles and twenty-four titles in doubles in his professional career, and was part of the winning tennis squad at Stanford University in 1973.

== Early life and college career ==
Mayer was born in Flushing, New York. He entered Stanford University in 1970 and majored in political science. In 1972, Mayer and Roscoe Tanner won the NCAA doubles championship, and the Stanford team finished second in the NCAA tournament, behind Trinity University.

In 1973, Mayer and Stanford won everything in the NCAA tournament: Mayer won singles, Mayer and Jim Delaney won doubles, and the team won the national championship ahead of USC.

== Professional career ==
The right-handed Mayer reached his highest singles ATP-ranking in April 1982, when he became world No. 7. He won 11 ATP singles titles and 24 doubles titles.

A strong grass-court player, Mayer reached the quarterfinals at Wimbledon on three occasions (1977, 1978, and 1983), losing to eventual or multi-time champions John McEnroe and Björn Borg. Mayer's greatest professional triumphs came in doubles at the Grand Slam level. In 1975, he partnered with Vitas Gerulaitis to capture the men's doubles title at Wimbledon. Four years later, in 1979, he teamed up with his younger brother, Gene Mayer, to win the clay-court doubles crown at the 1979 French Open by defeating Ross Case and Phil Dent in the final.

His younger brother Gene was also a world tour tennis player and reached a career high of world No. 4 in 1980.

== Family ==
Mayer resided in Atherton, California, and has four sons and a daughter, all of whom had been previously ranked in the United States Tennis Association Junior Tennis League in the Northern California Section. Mayer's former wife, Libby, is a teacher. They filed for divorce on August 5, 2016.

== Career finals ==
=== Singles: 22 (11 titles / 11 runner-ups) ===
Result	W–L	Date	Tournament	Surface	Opponent	Score
Loss	0–1	Jan 1973	Baltimore, U.S.	Hard (i)	(United States) Jimmy Connors	4–6, 5–7
Win	1–1	Jan 1973	Birmingham, U.S.	Hard	(United States) Charles Owens	6–4, 7–6
Win	2–1	Feb 1974	Baltimore, U.S.	Carpet	(United States) Clark Graebner	6–2, 6–1
Loss	2–2	Feb 1974	Birmingham, U.S.	Carpet (i)	(United States) Jimmy Connors	5–7, 3–6
Win	3–2	Mar 1974	Paramus, U.S.	Indoor	(West Germany) Jürgen Fassbender	6–1, 6–3
Win	4–2	Mar 1974	Jackson, U.S.	Carpet (i)	(West Germany) Karl Meiler	7–6, 7–5
Loss	4–3	Feb 1975	Fairfield, U.S.	Carpet (i)	(United Kingdom) Roger Taylor	5–7, 7–5, 6–7
Loss	4–4	Oct 1975	Maui, U.S.	Hard	(United States) Jimmy Connors	1–6, 0–6
Loss	4–5	Nov 1975	Hong Kong	Hard	(United States) Tom Gorman	3–6, 1–6, 1–6
Win	5–5	Feb 1977	Little Rock, U.S.	Carpet (i)	(Pakistan) Haroon Rahim	6–2, 6–4
Loss	5–6	Feb 1977	San Jose, U.S.	Hard	(Czechoslovakia) Jiří Hřebec	6–3, 4–6, 5–7
Win	6–6	Mar 1977	Hampton, U.S.	Hard (i)	(United States) Stan Smith	4–6, 6–3, 6–2, 1–6, 6–3
Win	7–6	Nov 1977	Stockholm Open, Sweden	Hard (i)	(South Africa) Raymond Moore	6–2, 6–4
Win	8–6	Feb 1978	St. Louis WCT, U.S.	Carpet (i)	(United States) Eddie Dibbs	7–6, 6–4
Loss	8–7	Jun 1980	Surbiton, England	Grass	(United States) Brian Gottfried	3–6, 3–6
Loss	8–8	Apr 1981	Los Angeles, U.S.	Hard	(United States) John McEnroe	7–6, 3–6, 3–6
Loss	8–9	Nov 1981	Cologne, West Germany	Carpet (i)	(Czechoslovakia) Ivan Lendl	3–6, 3–6
Loss	8–10	Nov 1981	Stockholm Open, Sweden	Hard (i)	(United States) Gene Mayer	4–6, 2–6
Win	9–10	Nov 1981	Bologna, Italy	Carpet (i)	(Romania) Ilie Năstase	7–5, 6–3
Loss	9–11	Jul 1982	Stuttgart Outdoor, Germany	Clay	(India) Ramesh Krishnan	7–5, 3–6, 3–6, 6–7
Win	10–11	Aug 1982	Cleveland, U.S.	Hard	(United States) Robert Van't Hof	7–5, 6–3
Win	11–11	Jul 1983	Gstaad, Switzerland	Clay	(Czechoslovakia) Tomáš Šmíd	6–0, 6–3, 6–2

=== Doubles: 40 (24 titles / 16 runner-ups) ===
Result	W–L	Date	Tournament	Surface	Partner	Opponents	Score
Loss	0–1	Aug 1971	Cincinnati, U.S.	Hard	(United States) Roscoe Tanner	(United States) Stan Smith (United States) Erik van Dillen	1–6, 6–3, 4–6
Loss	0–2	Jan 1973	Baltimore WCT, U.S.	Hard (i)	(United States) Paul Gerken	(United States) Jimmy Connors (United States) Clark Graebner	6–3, 2–6, 3–6
Win	1–2	Jan 1974	Roanoke, U.S.	Indoors	(United States) Vitas Gerulaitis	(New Zealand) Ian Crookenden (New Zealand) Jeff Simpson	7–6, 6–1
Win	2–2	Feb 1974	Birmingham, U.S.	Hard	(Australia) Ian Fletcher	(Greece) Nicholas Kalogeropoulos (Colombia) Iván Molina	4–6, 7–6, 6–1
Win	3–2	Feb 1975	Roanoke, U.S.	Indoors	(United States) Vitas Gerulaitis	(Spain) Juan Gisbert (Romania) Ion Țiriac	7–6, 1–6, 6–3
Win	4–2	Jul 1975	Wimbledon, London	Grass	(United States) Vitas Gerulaitis	(Rhodesia) Colin Dowdeswell (Australia) Allan Stone	7–5, 8–6, 6–4
Loss	4–3	Nov 1975	Hong Kong	Hard	(Australia) Bob Carmichael	(Netherlands) Tom Okker (Australia) Ken Rosewall	3–6, 4–6
Win	5–3	Feb 1976	Fort Worth WCT, U.S.	Hard	(United States) Vitas Gerulaitis	(United States) Eddie Dibbs (United States) Harold Solomon	6–4, 7–5
Win	6–3	Mar 1976	Palm Springs, U.S.	Hard	(Australia) Colin Dibley	(South Africa) Raymond Moore (United States) Erik van Dillen	6–4, 6–7, 7–6
Win	7–3	Mar 1977	Hampton, U.S.	Hard (i)	(United States) Stan Smith	(Australia) Paul Kronk (Australia) Cliff Letcher	6–4, 6–3
Win	8–3	Sep 1977	Los Angeles, U.S.	Hard	(South Africa) Frew McMillan	(United States) Tom Leonard (United States) Mike Machette	6–2, 6–3
Win	9–3	Nov 1977	Wembley, England	Hard	(South Africa) Frew McMillan	(United States) Brian Gottfried (Mexico) Raul Ramírez	6–3, 7–6
Win	10–3	Jan 1978	Birmingham WCT, U.S.	Carpet (i)	(United States) Vitas Gerulaitis	(South Africa) Frew McMillan (United States) Dick Stockton	3–6, 6–1, 7–6
Loss	10–4	Jan 1978	Philadelphia WCT, U.S.	Carpet (i)	(United States) Vitas Gerulaitis	(South Africa) Bob Hewitt (South Africa) Frew McMillan	4–6, 4–6
Loss	10–5	Feb 1978	Richmond WCT, U.S.	Carpet (i)	(United States) Vitas Gerulaitis	(South Africa) Bob Hewitt (South Africa) Frew McMillan	3–6, 5–7
Win	11–5	Apr 1978	Guadalajara, Mexico	Clay	(United States) Sherwood Stewart	(United States) Gene Mayer (India) Sashi Menon	4–6, 7–6, 6–3
Win	12–5	Apr 1978	San Jose, U.S.	Carpet	(United States) Gene Mayer	(United States) Hank Pfister (United States) Brad Rowe	6–3, 6–4
Win	13–5	Feb 1979	Rancho Mirage, U.S.	Hard	(United States) Gene Mayer	(South Africa) Cliff Drysdale (United States) Bruce Manson	6–4, 7–6
Win	14–5	Jun 1979	French Open, Paris	Clay	(United States) Gene Mayer	(Australia) Ross Case (Australia) Phil Dent	6–4, 6–4, 6–4
Loss	14–6	Jul 1979	Forest Hills WCT, U.S.	Clay	(United States) Gene Mayer	(United States) Peter Fleming (United States) John McEnroe	7–6, 6–7, 3–6
Win	15–6	Jul 1980	Boston, U.S.	Clay	(United States) Gene Mayer	(Chile) Hans Gildemeister (Ecuador) Andrés Gómez	1–6, 6–4, 6–4
Loss	15–7	Jul 1980	Washington, D.C., U.S.	Clay	(United States) Gene Mayer	(Chile) Hans Gildemeister (Ecuador) Andrés Gómez	4–6, 5–7
Win	16–7	Aug 1980	Columbus, U.S.	Hard	(United States) Brian Gottfried	(United States) Peter Fleming (United States) Eliot Teltscher	6–4, 6–2
Loss	16–8	Aug 1980	Toronto, Canada	Hard	(Switzerland) Heinz Günthardt	(United States) Bruce Manson (United States) Brian Teacher	3–6, 6–3, 4–6
Loss	16–9	Sep 1980	San Francisco, U.S.	Carpet (i)	(United States) Gene Mayer	(United States) Peter Fleming (United States) John McEnroe	1–6, 4–6
Win	17–9	Mar 1981	Memphis, U.S.	Hard (i)	(United States) Gene Mayer	(United States) Mike Cahill (United States) Tom Gullikson	7–6, 6–7, 7–6
Win	18–9	Mar 1981	Brussels, Belgium	Carpet (i)	(South Africa) Frew McMillan	(South Africa) Kevin Curren (United States) Steve Denton	4–6, 6–3, 6–3
Loss	18–10	Mar 1981	Rotterdam, Netherlands	Carpet (i)	(United States) Gene Mayer	(United States) Fritz Buehning (United States) Ferdi Taygan	6–7, 6–1, 4–6
Loss	18–11	Mar 1982	Strasbourg WCT, France	Carpet (i)	(South Africa) Frew McMillan	(Poland) Wojciech Fibak (Australia) John Fitzgerald	4–6, 3–6
Win	19–11	Jul 1982	Gstaad, Switzerland	Clay	(United States) Ferdi Taygan	(Switzerland) Heinz Günthardt (Switzerland) Markus Günthardt	6–2, 6–3
Loss	19–12	Apr 1983	Los Angeles, U.S.	Hard	(United States) Ferdi Taygan	(United States) Peter Fleming (United States) John McEnroe	1–6, 2–6
Win	20–12	Aug 1983	Montreal, Canada	Hard	(United States) Ferdi Taygan	(United States) Tim Gullikson (United States) Tom Gullikson	6–3, 6–4
Win	21–12	Jul 1984	Stuttgart Outdoor, Germany	Clay	(West Germany) Andreas Maurer	(United States) Fritz Buehning (United States) Ferdi Taygan	7–6, 6–4
Win	22–12	Aug 1984	Columbus, U.S.	Hard	(United States) Stan Smith	(United States) Charles Bud Cox (United States) Terry Moor	6–4, 6–7, 7–5
Loss	22–13	Aug 1984	Cincinnati, U.S.	Hard	(Hungary) Balázs Taróczy	(Paraguay) Francisco González (United States) Matt Mitchell	6–4, 3–6, 6–7
Loss	22–14	Sep 1984	Los Angeles, U.S.	Hard	(Poland) Wojciech Fibak	(United States) Ken Flach (United States) Robert Seguso	6–4, 4–6, 3–6
Win	23–14	Oct 1984	Cologne, Germany	Carpet (i)	(Poland) Wojciech Fibak	(Sweden) Jan Gunnarsson (Sweden) Joakim Nyström	6–1, 6–3
Win	24–14	Oct 1984	Vienna, Austria	Carpet (i)	(Poland) Wojciech Fibak	(Switzerland) Heinz Günthardt (Hungary) Balázs Taróczy	6–4, 6–4
Loss	24–15	Jan 1985	Philadelphia, U.S.	Carpet (i)	(Poland) Wojciech Fibak	(Sweden) Joakim Nyström (Sweden) Mats Wilander	6–3, 2–6, 2–6
Loss	24–16	Sep 1985	San Francisco, U.S.	Hard (i)	(United States) Brad Gilbert	(United States) Paul Annacone (South Africa) Christo van Rensburg	6–3, 3–6, 4–6
