= Karl Meiler =

West German tennis player

- Country (sports): West Germany
- Residence: Munich, Germany
- Born: 30 April 1949 Erlangen, Germany
- Died: 17 April 2014 (aged 64)
- Height: 1.78 m (5 ft 10 in)
- Turned pro: 1970
- Retired: 1986
- Plays: Right-handed (one-handed backhand)

Singles
- Career record: 253–191
- Career titles: 4
- Highest ranking: No. 20 (23 August 1973)

Grand Slam singles results
- Australian Open: SF (1973)
- French Open: 3R (1977)
- Wimbledon: 3R (1973, 1976, 1977)
- US Open: 4R (1975)

Doubles
- Career record: 189–124
- Career titles: 17
- Highest ranking: No. 12

Grand Slam doubles results
- Australian Open: QF (1977)
- French Open: QF (1977)
- Wimbledon: SF (1973)
- US Open: 3R (1973)

Other doubles tournaments
- Tour Finals: W (1976 WCT)

Karl Meiler (30 April 1949 – 17 April 2014) was a tennis player from West Germany who was active in the 1970s and 1980s.

Meiler won four singles (1972, Buenos Aires; 1974, Omaha and Calgary; 1977, Manila) and 17 doubles titles during his professional career. He notably beat top seed Ken Rosewall in the 1973 Australian Open, where he went on to reach the semifinals. Meiler reached his highest singles ATP-ranking on 23 August 1973 when he became world No. 20. He died aged 64 on 17 April 2014 of complications from a head injury sustained in a domestic accident in November 2013.

== ATP career finals ==
=== Singles: 17 (4 titles / 13 runner-ups) ===
Result	W-L	Date	Tournament	Surface	Opponent	Score
Win	1–0	Nov 1972	Buenos Aires, Argentina	Clay	(Argentina) Guillermo Vilas	6–7, 2–6, 6–4, 6–4, 6–4
Loss	1–1	Feb 1973	Salisbury, U.S.	Hard (i)	(United States) Jimmy Connors	6–7, 6–7, 3–6
Loss	1–2	Jun 1973	West Berlin, Germany	Hard	(West Germany) Hans-Jürgen Pohmann	3–6, 6–3, 3–6, 3–6
Loss	1–3	Jun 1973	Hamburg, Germany	Clay	(United States) Eddie Dibbs	1–6, 6–3, 6–7, 3–6
Loss	1–4	Jan 1974	Roanoke, U.S.	Indoor	(United States) Jimmy Connors	4–6, 3–6
Win	2–4	Jan 1974	Omaha, U.S.	Carpet (i)	(United States) Jimmy Connors	6–3, 1–6, 6–1
Loss	2–5	Feb 1974	Little Rock, U.S.	Carpet (i)	(United States) Jimmy Connors	2–6, 1–6
Win	3–5	Mar 1974	Calgary, Canada	Indoor	(South Africa) Byron Bertram	6–4, 3–6, 6–3
Loss	3–6	Mar 1974	Jackson, U.S.	Carpet (i)	(United States) Sandy Mayer	6–7, 5–7
Loss	3–7	Nov 1974	Oslo, Norway	Indoor	(United States) Jeff Borowiak	3–6, 2–6
Loss	3–8	Jan 1975	Nassau, Bahamas	Outdoor	(United States) Jimmy Connors	0–6, 2–6
Loss	3–9	May 1975	Munich, Germany	Clay	(Argentina) Guillermo Vilas	6–2, 0–6, 2–6, 3–6
Loss	3–10	Jul 1975	Gstaad, Switzerland	Clay	(Australia) Ken Rosewall	4–6, 4–6, 3–6
Loss	3–11	May 1976	Munich, Germany	Clay	(Spain) Manuel Orantes	1–6, 4–6, 1–6
Loss	3–12	Jun 1977	Brussels, Belgium	Clay	(United States) Harold Solomon	5–7, 6–3, 6–2, 3–6, 4–6
Win	4–12	Nov 1977	Manila, Philippines	Clay	(Spain) Manuel Orantes	DEF
Loss	4–13	May 1979	Florence, Italy	Clay	(Mexico) Raúl Ramírez	4–6, 6–1, 6–3, 5–7, 0–6

=== Doubles: 24 (17 titles / 7 runner-ups) ===
Result	W-L	Date	Tournament	Surface	Partner	Opponents	Score
Loss	0–1	Jun 1972	London/Queen's Club, UK	Grass	(West Germany) Jürgen Fassbender	(United States) Jim McManus (United States) Jim Osborne	6–4, 3–6, 5–7
Win	1–1	Jan 1974	Omaha, U.S.	Hard	(West Germany) Jürgen Fassbender	(Australia) Ian Fletcher (Australia) Kim Warwick	6–2, 6–4
Win	2–1	Feb 1974	Baltimore, U.S.	Carpet	(West Germany) Jürgen Fassbender	(Australia) Owen Davidson (United States) Clark Graebner	7–6, 7–5
Win	3–1	Feb 1974	Little Rock, U.S.	Carpet	(West Germany) Jürgen Fassbender	(United States) Vitas Gerulaitis (South Africa) Bob Hewitt	6–0, 6–2
Win	4–1	Mar 1974	Calgary, Canada	Indoor	(West Germany) Jürgen Fassbender	(Colombia) Iván Molina (Colombia) Jairo Velasco Sr.	6–4, 6–4
Win	5–1	Mar 1974	Tempe, U.S.	Hard	(West Germany) Jürgen Fassbender	(Australia) Ian Fletcher (Australia) Kim Warwick	4–6, 6–4, 7–5
Win	6–1	Nov 1974	Oslo, Norway	Indoor	(Pakistan) Haroon Rahim	(United States) Jeff Borowiak (United States) Vitas Gerulaitis	6–3, 6–2
Win	7–1	Jan 1975	Birmingham, U.S.	Carpet	(West Germany) Jürgen Fassbender	(Rhodesia) Colin Dowdeswell (South Africa) John Yuill	6–1, 3–6, 7–6
Loss	7–2	Mar 1975	Hampton, U.S.	Carpet	(Czechoslovakia) Jan Písecký	(New Zealand) Ian Crookenden (Australia) Ian Fletcher	2–6, 7–6, 4–6
Loss	7–3	May 1975	Munich, Germany	Clay	(Czechoslovakia) Milan Holeček	(Poland) Wojciech Fibak (Czechoslovakia) Jan Kodeš	5–7, 3–6
Loss	7–4	Oct 1975	Barcelona, Spain	Clay	(Poland) Wojciech Fibak	(Sweden) Björn Borg (Argentina) Guillermo Vilas	6–3, 4–6, 3–6
Win	8–4	Nov 1975	Paris Indoor, France	Hard (i)	(Poland) Wojciech Fibak	(Romania) Ilie Năstase (Netherlands) Tom Okker	6–4, 7–6
Win	9–4	Nov 1975	London, England	Carpet	(Poland) Wojciech Fibak	(United States) Jimmy Connors (Romania) Ilie Năstase	6–1, 7–5
Loss	9–5	Jan 1976	Atlanta WCT, U.S.	Carpet	(Poland) Wojciech Fibak	(Australia) John Alexander (Australia) Phil Dent	3–6, 4–6
Loss	9–6	Feb 1976	Barcelona WCT, Spain	Clay	(Poland) Wojciech Fibak	(United States) Robert Lutz (United States) Stan Smith	3–6, 3–6
Win	10–6	Mar 1976	Nuremberg, Germany	Carpet	(South Africa) Frew McMillan	(Rhodesia) Colin Dowdeswell (Australia) Paul Kronk	7–6, 6–4
Loss	10–7	Apr 1976	Nice, France	Clay	(Poland) Wojciech Fibak	(France) Patrice Dominguez (France) François Jauffret	4–6, 6–3, 3–6
Win	11–7	Apr 1976	Monte Carlo WCT, Monaco	Clay	(Poland) Wojciech Fibak	(Sweden) Björn Borg (Argentina) Guillermo Vilas	7–6, 6–1
Win	12–7	May 1976	WCT World Doubles, US	Carpet	(Poland) Wojciech Fibak	(United States) Robert Lutz (United States) Stan Smith	6–3, 2–6, 3–6, 6–3, 6–4
Win	13–7	May 1976	Düsseldorf, Germany	Clay	(Poland) Wojciech Fibak	(Australia) Bob Carmichael (South Africa) Raymond Moore	6–4, 4–6, 6–4
Win	14–7	May 1977	Hamburg, Germany	Clay	(South Africa) Bob Hewitt	(Australia) Phil Dent (Australia) Kim Warwick	3–6, 6–3, 6–4, 6–4
Win	15–7	May 1977	Düsseldorf, Germany	Clay	(West Germany) Jürgen Fassbender	(Australia) Paul Kronk (Australia) Cliff Letcher	6–3, 6–3
Win	16–7	Jul 1977	Gstaad, Switzerland	Clay	(West Germany) Jürgen Fassbender	(Switzerland) Colin Dowdeswell (South Africa) Bob Hewitt	6–4, 7–6
Win	17–7	Mar 1979	Nancy, France	Hard (i)	(West Germany) Klaus Eberhard	(United Kingdom) Robin Drysdale (United Kingdom) Andrew Jarrett	4–6, 7–6, 6–3
