= 1974 U.S. Professional Indoor – Singles =

Singles
- 1974 U.S. Professional Indoor

Final
- Champion: (Australia) Rod Laver
- Runner-up: (United States) Arthur Ashe
- Score: 6–1, 6–4, 3–6, 6–4

Details
- Draw: 84
- Seeds: 16

Events
Singles	Doubles
← 1973 ·	U.S. Professional Indoor	· 1975 →

Stan Smith was the defending champion, but lost in the third round this year.

Rod Laver won the title, defeating Arthur Ashe 6–1, 6–4, 3–6, 6–4 in the final.

== Seeds ==
1. (Romania) Ilie Năstase (second round, withdrew)
2. (Australia) John Newcombe (second round, withdrew)
3. (Netherlands) Tom Okker (quarterfinals)
4. (United States) Stan Smith (third round)
5. (Spain) Manuel Orantes (second round, withdrew)
6. (Australia) Rod Laver (champion)
7. (Czechoslovakia) Jan Kodeš (semifinals)
8. (United States) Arthur Ashe (final)
9. (United States) Tom Gorman (first round)
10. (United States) Marty Riessen (second round)
11. (Italy) Adriano Panatta (quarterfinals)
12. (Socialist Federal Republic of Yugoslavia) Nikola Pilić (second round)
13. (United Kingdom) Roger Taylor (third round)
14. (Chile) Jaime Fillol (second round)
15. (Sweden) Björn Borg (third round)
16. (United States) Cliff Richey (third round)

== Draw ==
=== Key ===
- Q = Qualifier
- WC = Wild card
- LL = Lucky loser
- Alt = Alternate
- SE = Special exempt
- PR = Protected ranking
- ITF = ITF entry
- JE = Junior exempt
- w/o = Walkover
- r = Retired
- d = Defaulted
- SR = Special ranking

=== Final rounds ===
Quarterfinals
(Australia) Tony Roche	6	6
(United Kingdom) Mark Cox	4	4
11	(Italy) Adriano Panatta	1	7^{7}	3
8	(United States) Arthur Ashe	6	6^{1}	6
6	(Australia) Rod Laver	6	6
3	(Netherlands) Tom Okker	4	2
7	(Czechoslovakia) Jan Kodeš	6	6
(United States) Eddie Dibbs	4	4

Semifinals
(Australia) Tony Roche	4	6^{4}	1
8	(United States) Arthur Ashe	6	7^{7}	6
6	(Australia) Rod Laver	6	1	6	6
7	(Czechoslovakia) Jan Kodeš	4	6	4	0

Final
8	(United States) Arthur Ashe	1	4	6	4
6	(Australia) Rod Laver	6	6	3	6

=== Top half ===
==== Section 1 ====
First round

Second round
2	(Australia) J Newcombe
(Sweden) ON Bengtson	w/o
(United Kingdom) G Battrick	6	6
(France) P Barthès	1	1
15	(Sweden) B Borg	w/o
(Czechoslovakia) J Hřebec
(Australia) T Roche	7^{8}	6
(Romania) I Țiriac	6^{6}	2

Third round
(Sweden) ON Bengtson	7^{7}	6
(United Kingdom) G Battrick	6^{5}	1
15	(Sweden) B Borg	6^{4}	6^{5}
(Australia) T Roche	7^{7}	7^{7}

Fourth round
(Sweden) ON Bengtson	6^{5}	2
(Australia) T Roche	7^{7}	6

==== Section 2 ====
First round

Second round
5	(Spain) M Orantes
(Japan) J Kamiwazumi	w/o
(United States) R Lutz	w/o
(United States) C Pasarell
10	(United States) M Riessen	3	6	4
(South Africa) F McMillan	6	2	6
(United Kingdom) M Cox	6	6
(Egypt) I El Shafei	4	4

Third round
(Japan) J Kamiwazumi	2	1
(United States) R Lutz	6	6
(South Africa) F McMillan	3	2
(United Kingdom) M Cox	6	6

Fourth round
(United States) R Lutz	3	1
(United Kingdom) M Cox	6	6

==== Section 3 ====
First round
(United Kingdom) B Mottram	6	6
(Socialist Federal Republic of Yugoslavia) B Jovanović	3	0
(United States) T Edlefsen	6	7^{7}
(United States) T Leonard	4	6^{4}

Second round
4	(United States) S Smith	w/o
(Czechoslovakia) J Kukal
(Mexico) R Ramírez	6	7^{7}
(United States) M Estep	1	6^{5}
11	(Italy) A Panatta	6	6
(South Africa) P Cramer	4	3
(United Kingdom) B Mottram	6	6
(United States) T Edlefsen	4	0

Third round
4	(United States) S Smith	6^{5}	6	6^{5}
(Mexico) R Ramírez	7^{7}	3	7^{7}
11	(Italy) A Panatta	6	6
(United Kingdom) B Mottram	1	3

Fourth round
(Mexico) R Ramírez	6	2	3
11	(Italy) A Panatta	3	6	6

==== Section 4 ====
First round
8	(United States) A Ashe	6	6^{4}	6
(France) J-B Chanfreau	1	7^{7}	2
(United States) C Graebner	6^{2}	4
(France) P Proisy	7^{7}	6
(West Germany) H Elschenbroich	3	6	4
(Pakistan) H Rahim	6	4	6
(United States) B Gottfried	6	6
(Spain) A Muñoz	4	4
16	(United States) C Richey	6	5	7^{8}
(Australia) P Dent	2	7	6^{6}
(United Kingdom) G Stilwell	7	4	5
(Australia) D Crealy	5	6	7
(Australia) O Davidson	2	4
(United States) A Pattison	6	6
(Soviet Union) A Metreveli	w/o
(United States) E van Dillen

Second round
8	(United States) A Ashe	6	6
(France) P Proisy	3	2
(Pakistan) H Rahim	1	1
(United States) B Gottfried	6	6
16	(United States) C Richey	6	6
(Australia) D Crealy	2	2
(United States) A Pattison	6	3	4
(Soviet Union) A Metreveli	0	6	6

Third round
8	(United States) A Ashe	6	6
(United States) B Gottfried	4	4
16	(United States) C Richey	6^{3}	4
(Soviet Union) A Metreveli	7^{7}	6

Fourth round
8	(United States) A Ashe	6	7^{7}
(Soviet Union) A Metreveli	2	6^{3}

=== Bottom half ===
==== Section 5 ====
First round
(United States) J McManus	7	2	2
(Socialist Federal Republic of Yugoslavia) Ž Franulović	5	6	6
(United States) F Froehling	2	5
(Australia) B Phillips-Moore	6	7
(West Germany) HJ Pohmann	7	4	7
(Czechoslovakia) M Holeček	5	6	5
(Australia) R Case	6	4	6
9	(United States) T Gorman	4	6	4
(Australia) C Dibley	6	2	6
(Chile) P Cornejo	3	6	2
(Argentina) G Vilas	4	1
(South Africa) C Drysdale	6	6
(United States) J Borowiak	6	6
(Australia) R Ruffels	4	3
(Argentina) T Vázquez	4	6	2
6	(Australia) R Laver	6	3	6

Second round
(Socialist Federal Republic of Yugoslavia) Ž Franulović	7^{7}	7^{7}
(Australia) B Phillips-Moore	6^{4}	6^{5}
(West Germany) HJ Pohmann	2	2
(Australia) R Case	6	6
(Australia) C Dibley	4	1
(South Africa) C Drysdale	6	6
(United States) J Borowiak	4	2
6	(Australia) R Laver	6	6

Third round
(Socialist Federal Republic of Yugoslavia) Ž Franulović	3	4
(Australia) R Case	6	6
(South Africa) C Drysdale	4	4
6	(Australia) R Laver	6	6

Fourth round
(Australia) R Case	4	2
6	(Australia) R Laver	6	6

==== Section 6 ====
First round
(New Zealand) B Fairlie	3	6	6
(Czechoslovakia) V Zedník	6	4	2
(Australia) B Carmichael	6	6^{5}	4
(United States) H Solomon	1	7^{7}	6

Second round
(New Zealand) B Fairlie
(United States) H Solomon	w/o
(South Africa) B Hewitt	6	7
14	(Chile) J Fillol	2	5
(Spain) J Gisbert Sr.
(Denmark) T Ulrich	w/o
(Australia) G Masters	3	4
3	(Netherlands) T Okker	6	6

Third round
(United States) H Solomon	6	6
(South Africa) B Hewitt	4	3
(Denmark) T Ulrich	3	3
3	(Netherlands) T Okker	6	6

Fourth round
(United States) H Solomon	5	1
3	(Netherlands) T Okker	7	6

==== Section 7 ====
First round

Second round
(United States) P Gerken	2	6	7^{7}
(Italy) A Zugarelli	6	1	6^{4}
(France) G Goven	6	6
12	(Socialist Federal Republic of Yugoslavia) N Pilić	4	4
(United States) R Tanner	6	2	3
(United States) D Stockton	4	6	6
(South Africa) R Moore	2	4
7	(Czechoslovakia) J Kodeš	6	6

Third round
(United States) P Gerken	6	7^{7}
(France) G Goven	2	6^{5}
(United States) D Stockton	6	6^{5}	4
7	(Czechoslovakia) J Kodeš	4	7^{7}	6

Fourth round
(United States) P Gerken	3	6	4
7	(Czechoslovakia) J Kodeš	6	3	6

==== Section 8 ====
First round

Second round
(France) P Dominguez	1	6^{4}
(United States) E Dibbs	6	7^{7}
(New Zealand) O Parun	4	0
13	(United Kingdom) R Taylor	6	6
(South Africa) R Maud	6	6
(Australia) A Stone	3	3
(Australia) J Alexander	w/o
1	(Romania) I Năstase

Third round
(United States) E Dibbs	6	1	7
13	(United Kingdom) R Taylor	3	6	5
(South Africa) R Maud	4	7^{7}	6
(Australia) J Alexander	6	6^{4}	4

Fourth round
(United States) E Dibbs	6	6
(South Africa) R Maud	2	4
