= 1973 USLTA Indoor Circuit =

Details
- Duration: January 1, 1973 – 19 March 1973
- Edition: 3rd
- Tournaments: 13

Achievements (singles)
- Most titles: (United States) Jimmy Connors (6)
- Most finals: (United States) Jimmy Connors (9)
- Prize money leader: (United States) Jimmy Connors (37,700)

The 1973 USLTA Indoor Circuit was a professional tennis circuit held in the United States from January until March that year. It consisted of 13 tournaments and was organized by Bill Riordan and sanctioned by the United States Lawn Tennis Association (USLTA).

== Schedule ==
=== January ===
Week of	Tournament	Champion	Runner-up	Semifinalists	Quarterfinalists
1 Jan	Baltimore International Indoors; Baltimore, Maryland, U.S. Carpet – $15,000 – 16S/8D	(United States) Jimmy Connors; 6–4, 7–5	(United States) Sandy Mayer	(United States) Clark Graebner (United States) Dick Stockton	(United States) Paul Gerken (New Zealand) Ian Crookenden (South Africa) Pat Cramer (United States) Herb Fitzgibbon
1 Jan	Baltimore International Indoors; Baltimore, Maryland, U.S. Carpet – $15,000 – 16S/8D	(United States) Jimmy Connors (United States) Clark Graebner; 3–6, 6–2, 6–3	(United States) Sandy Mayer (United States) Paul Gerken	(United States) Clark Graebner (United States) Dick Stockton	(United States) Paul Gerken (New Zealand) Ian Crookenden (South Africa) Pat Cramer (United States) Herb Fitzgibbon
15 Jan	Birmingham International; Birmingham, Alabama, U.S. Carpet – $15,000 – 16S/9D	(United States) Sandy Mayer; 6–4, 7–6	(United States) Charlie Owens	(United States) Clark Graebner (West Germany) Jürgen Fassbender	(United States) Pat DuPré (South Africa) Pat Cramer (Australia) John Cooper (Canada) Mike Belkin
15 Jan	Birmingham International; Birmingham, Alabama, U.S. Carpet – $15,000 – 16S/9D	(West Germany) Jürgen Fassbender (South Africa) Pat Cramer; 6–4, 7–5	(Romania) Ion Țiriac (United States) Clark Graebner	(United States) Clark Graebner (West Germany) Jürgen Fassbender	(United States) Pat DuPré (South Africa) Pat Cramer (Australia) John Cooper (Canada) Mike Belkin
15 Jan	Roanoke International; Roanoke, Virginia, U.S. Carpet – $7,500 – 8S/4D	(United States) Jimmy Connors; 6–2, 6–3	(Australia) Ian Fletcher	(Argentina) Tito Vázquez (United Kingdom) John Paish	(Chile) Jaime Pinto Bravo (New Zealand) Ian Crookenden (United States) Butch Seewagen (Spain) Juan Gisbert Sr.
15 Jan	Roanoke International; Roanoke, Virginia, U.S. Carpet – $7,500 – 8S/4D	(United States) Jimmy Connors (Spain) Juan Gisbert Sr. 6–0, 7–6	(Australia) Ian Fletcher (United States) Butch Seewagen	(Argentina) Tito Vázquez (United Kingdom) John Paish	(Chile) Jaime Pinto Bravo (New Zealand) Ian Crookenden (United States) Butch Seewagen (Spain) Juan Gisbert Sr.
28 Jan	Midlands International; Omaha, Nebraska, U.S. Carpet – $15,000 – 16S/16S	(Romania) Ilie Năstase; 5–0, ret.	(United States) Jimmy Connors	(Spain) Juan Gisbert Sr. (West Germany) Jürgen Fassbender	(South Africa) Pat Cramer (Romania) Ion Țiriac (United States) Paul Gerken (United States) Sandy Mayer
28 Jan	Midlands International; Omaha, Nebraska, U.S. Carpet – $15,000 – 16S/16S	(United States) William Brown (United States) Mike Estep walkover	(United States) Jimmy Connors (Spain) Juan Gisbert Sr.	(Spain) Juan Gisbert Sr. (West Germany) Jürgen Fassbender	(South Africa) Pat Cramer (Romania) Ion Țiriac (United States) Paul Gerken (United States) Sandy Mayer
28 Jan	Des Moines International; Des Moines, Iowa, U.S. Hard – $15,000 – 16S/16S	(United States) Clark Graebner; 7–5, 5–7, 6–4	(Greece) Nicholas Kalogeropoulos	(West Germany) Karl Meiler (Spain) Juan Gisbert Sr.	(Hungary) Szabolcs Baranyi (Chile) Jaime Pinto Bravo (South Africa) Pat Cramer (Australia) Ian Fletcher
28 Jan	Des Moines International; Des Moines, Iowa, U.S. Hard – $15,000 – 16S/16S	(Czechoslovakia) Jan Kukal (Czechoslovakia) Jiří Hřebec; 4–6, 7–6, 6–1	(Romania) Ion Țiriac (Spain) Juan Gisbert Sr.	(West Germany) Karl Meiler (Spain) Juan Gisbert Sr.	(Hungary) Szabolcs Baranyi (Chile) Jaime Pinto Bravo (South Africa) Pat Cramer (Australia) Ian Fletcher

=== February ===
Week of	Tournament	Champion	Runner-up	Semifinalists	Quarterfinalists
5 Feb	Salt Lake City, Utah, U.S. Hard – 16S/8D	(United States) Jimmy Connors; 6–1, 6–2	(United States) Paul Gerken	(Romania) Ilie Năstase (Hungary) Szabolcs Baranyi	(Czechoslovakia) Jiří Hřebec (West Germany) Jürgen Fassbender (Spain) Juan Gisbert Sr. (United States) Mike Estep
5 Feb	Salt Lake City, Utah, U.S. Hard – 16S/8D	(United States) Mike Estep (Mexico) Raúl Ramírez; 6–4, 7–6	(Czechoslovakia) Jan Kukal (Czechoslovakia) Jiří Hřebec	(Romania) Ilie Năstase (Hungary) Szabolcs Baranyi	(Czechoslovakia) Jiří Hřebec (West Germany) Jürgen Fassbender (Spain) Juan Gisbert Sr. (United States) Mike Estep
12 Feb	Canadian Indoor Championships; Calgary, Alberta, Canada; Hard (i) – $20,000 – 28S/14D	(Romania) Ilie Năstase; 6–4, 7–6^{(5–4)}	(United States) Paul Gerken	(Romania) Ion Țiriac (Spain) Juan Gisbert Sr.	(Greece) Nicholas Kalogeropoulos (South Africa) Pat Cramer (West Germany) Jürgen Fassbender (West Germany) Karl Meiler
12 Feb	Canadian Indoor Championships; Calgary, Alberta, Canada; Hard (i) – $20,000 – 28S/14D	(Romania) Ilie Năstase (United States) Mike Estep; 6–7, 7–5, 6–3	(Hungary) Péter Szőke (Hungary) Szabolcs Baranyi	(Romania) Ion Țiriac (Spain) Juan Gisbert Sr.	(Greece) Nicholas Kalogeropoulos (South Africa) Pat Cramer (West Germany) Jürgen Fassbender (West Germany) Karl Meiler
19 Feb	U.S. National Indoor Championships; Salisbury, Maryland, U.S. Hard (i) – $50,000 – 64S/32D	(United States) Jimmy Connors; 6–4, 7–6	(West Germany) Karl Meiler	(United States) Frank Froehling (United States) Brian Gottfried	(United States) Charlie Owens (United States) Sandy Mayer (United States) John Austin (Romania) Ilie Năstase
19 Feb	U.S. National Indoor Championships; Salisbury, Maryland, U.S. Hard (i) – $50,000 – 64S/32D	(West Germany) Jürgen Fassbender (Spain) Juan Gisbert Sr. 2–6, 6–4, 6–3	(United States) Clark Graebner (Romania) Ilie Năstase	(United States) Frank Froehling (United States) Brian Gottfried	(United States) Charlie Owens (United States) Sandy Mayer (United States) John Austin (Romania) Ilie Năstase
26 Feb	Coliseum Mall International; Hampton, Virginia, U.S. Carpet (i) – $35,000 – 32S/16D; Singles – Doubles	(United States) Jimmy Connors; 4–6, 6–3, 7–5, 6–3	(Romania) Ilie Năstase	(United States) Paul Gerken (United States) Mike Estep	(West Germany) Jürgen Fassbender (United States) Sherwood Stewart (United States) Clark Graebner (United States) Brian Gottfried
26 Feb	Coliseum Mall International; Hampton, Virginia, U.S. Carpet (i) – $35,000 – 32S/16D; Singles – Doubles	(United States) Clark Graebner (Romania) Ilie Năstase; 6–2, 6–1	(United States) Jimmy Connors (Romania) Ion Țiriac	(United States) Paul Gerken (United States) Mike Estep	(West Germany) Jürgen Fassbender (United States) Sherwood Stewart (United States) Clark Graebner (United States) Brian Gottfried

=== March ===
Week of	Tournament	Champion	Runner-up	Semifinalists	Quarterfinalists
5 Mar	Paramus Tennis Classic Paramus, New Jersey, U.S. Hard (i) – 16S/8D	(United States) Jimmy Connors; 6–1, 6–2	(United States) Clark Graebner	(Spain) Juan Gisbert Sr. (Romania) Ilie Năstase	(United States) Sandy Mayer (Romania) Ion Țiriac (United States) Vitas Gerulaitis (United States) Steve Siegel
5 Mar	Garcia Classic; San Juan, Puerto Rico, U.S.	(Soviet Union) Alex Metreveli; 6–4, 6–4, 0–6, 7–5	(United Kingdom) Roger Taylor		
19 Mar	Equity Funding Championship; Washington, D.C., U.S. Carpet – 32S	(Romania) Ilie Năstase; 4–6, 6–2, 7–5, 6–2	(United States) Jimmy Connors	(West Germany) Jürgen Fassbender (West Germany) Karl Meiler	(Greece) Nicholas Kalogeropoulos (Australia) Ian Fletcher (United States) Billy Martin (United States) Paul Gerken
19 Mar	Mississippi Indoors; Jackson, Mississippi, U.S. Hard – 16S/D16	(United States) Eddie Dibbs; 5–7, 6–1, 7–5	(South Africa) Frew McMillan	(United States) Sherwood Stewart (United States) Raz Reid	(United States) Zan Guerry (Chile) Jaime Pinto Bravo (United States) Charles Owens (United States) Clark Graebner

== Prize money standings ==
Rk	Name	Prize money
1	Jimmy Connors (USA)	$37,700
2	Ilie Năstase (ROM)	$20,125
3	Clark Graebner (USA)	$15,250
4	Jürgen Fassbender (FRG)	$12,150
5	Juan Gisbert Sr. (ESP)	$10,375
6	Karl Meiler (FRG)	$9,525
7	Sandy Mayer (USA)	$9,425
8	Paul Gerken (USA)	$8,975
9	Nicky Kalo (GRE)	$6,300
10	Ion Țiriac (ROM)	$6.050

== See also ==
- 1973 Grand Prix circuit
- 1973 World Championship Tennis circuit
