= 1974 U.S. Professional Indoor – Doubles =

Doubles
- 1974 U.S. Professional Indoor

Final
- Champions: (South Africa) Pat Cramer (United States) Mike Estep
- Runners-up: (France) Jean-Baptiste Chanfreau (France) Georges Goven
- Score: 6–1, 6–1

Events
Singles	Doubles
← 1973 ·	U.S. Professional Indoor	· 1975 →

Brian Gottfried and Dick Stockton were the defending champions, but lost in the third round this year.

Pat Cramer and Mike Estep won the title, defeating Jean-Baptiste Chanfreau and Georges Goven 6–1, 6–1 in the final.

== Seeds ==
1. (Australia) Owen Davidson / (Australia) John Newcombe (second round, withdrew)
2. (United States) Brian Gottfried / (United States) Dick Stockton (third round)
3. (Australia) Ross Case / (Australia) Geoff Masters (second round)
4. (United States) Tom Gorman / (United States) Erik van Dillen (second round, withdrew)
5. (Australia) John Alexander / (Australia) Phil Dent (second round)
6. (Netherlands) Tom Okker / (United States) Marty Riessen (quarterfinals)
7. (Chile) Patricio Cornejo / (Chile) Jaime Fillol (third round)
8. (United States) Jim McManus / (United States) Andrew Pattison (semifinals)

== Draw ==
=== Key ===
- Q = Qualifier
- WC = Wild card
- LL = Lucky loser
- Alt = Alternate
- SE = Special exempt
- PR = Protected ranking
- ITF = ITF entry
- JE = Junior exempt
- w/o = Walkover
- r = Retired
- d = Defaulted
- SR = Special ranking

=== Finals ===
Semifinals
8	(United States) Jim McManus (United States) Andrew Pattison	2	6
(France) Jean-Baptiste Chanfreau (France) Georges Goven	6	7
(South Africa) Pat Cramer (United States) Mike Estep	7	6
(United States) Tom Edlefsen (United States) Tom Leonard	5	2

Final
(France) Jean-Baptiste Chanfreau (France) Georges Goven	1	1
(South Africa) Pat Cramer (United States) Mike Estep	6	6

=== Top half ===
==== Section 1 ====
First round

Second round
2	(United States) B Gottfried (United States) D Stockton	w/o
(Czechoslovakia) J Hřebec (Czechoslovakia) J Kukal
(Italy) A Panatta (Romania) I Țiriac	6	6	7
(United Kingdom) M Cox (Japan) J Kamiwazumi	4	7	5
(Argentina) T Vázquez (Argentina) G Vilas	4	2
8	(United States) J McManus (United States) A Pattison	6	6
(United Kingdom) G Battrick (United Kingdom) G Stilwell	7	6	6
(United States) P Gerken (Pakistan) H Rahim	6	7	4

Third round
2	(United States) B Gottfried (United States) D Stockton	4	6	4
(Italy) A Panatta (Romania) I Țiriac	6	4	6
8	(United States) J McManus (United States) A Pattison	6	6
(United Kingdom) G Battrick (United Kingdom) G Stilwell	4	4

Quarterfinals
(Italy) A Panatta (Romania) I Țiriac	6	6	6
8	(United States) J McManus (United States) A Pattison	4	7	7

==== Section 2 ====
First round
(United States) C Richey (Denmark) T Ulrich
(Australia) D Crealy (Czechoslovakia) M Holeček	w/o
6	(Netherlands) T Okker (United States) M Riessen	w/o
(Romania) I Năstase (Spain) M Orantes
(Spain) A Muñoz (Italy) A Zugarelli	w/o
(Socialist Federal Republic of Yugoslavia) N Pilić (Australia) A Stone
(Egypt) I El Shafei (New Zealand) B Fairlie	7	0	1
(South Africa) B Hewitt (South Africa) F McMillan	5	6	6
(Sweden) ON Bengtson (Sweden) B Borg	7	7
(France) P Barthès (Australia) T Roche	6	6

Second round
3	(Australia) R Case (Australia) G Masters	4	5
(France) J-P Chanfreau (France) G Goven	6	7
(France) P Dominguez (France) P Proisy	7	6
(Australia) D Crealy (Czechoslovakia) M Holeček	6	4
6	(Netherlands) T Okker (United States) M Riessen	6	6
(Spain) A Muñoz (Italy) A Zugarelli	2	3
(South Africa) B Hewitt (South Africa) F McMillan	2	6	7
(Sweden) ON Bengtson (Sweden) B Borg	6	3	5

Third round
(France) J-B Chanfreau (France) G Goven	3	7	6
(France) P Dominguez (France) P Proisy	6	5	3
6	(Netherlands) T Okker (United States) M Riessen	6	7
(South Africa) B Hewitt (South Africa) F McMillan	4	5

Quarterfinals
(France) J-P Chanfreau (France) G Goven	6	1	6
6	(Netherlands) T Okker (United States) M Riessen	4	6	3

=== Bottom half ===
==== Section 3 ====
First round
(Czechoslovakia) J Kodeš (Czechoslovakia) V Zedník	4	4
(United States) C Graebner (United States) C Pasarell	6	6
(South Africa) C Drysdale (South Africa) R Maud	6	6	6
(South Africa) P Cramer (United States) M Estep	7	4	7
(United Kingdom) B Mottram (Mexico) R Ramírez	3	6	3
(Australia) C Dibley (Australia) R Laver	6	3	6
(West Germany) H Elschenbroich (West Germany) HJ Pohmann	4	3
5	(Australia) J Alexander (Australia) P Dent	6	6
(United States) F Froehling (Australia) B Phillips-Moore	4	4
(United States) A Ashe (United States) R Tanner	6	6

Second round
(United States) C Graebner (United States) C Pasarell	6	7	3
(South Africa) P Cramer (United States) M Estep	7	6	6
(Australia) C Dibley (Australia) R Laver	6	7
5	(Australia) J Alexander (Australia) P Dent	3	6
(United States) A Ashe (United States) R Tanner	6	4
(United States) R Lutz (United States) S Smith	7	6
(Socialist Federal Republic of Yugoslavia) Ž Franulović (Socialist Federal Republic of Yugoslavia) B Jovanović	w/o
4	(United States) T Gorman (United States) E van Dillen

Third round
(South Africa) P Cramer (United States) M Estep	7	6
(Australia) C Dibley (Australia) R Laver	6	4
(United States) R Lutz (United States) S Smith	6	6
(Socialist Federal Republic of Yugoslavia) Ž Franulović (Socialist Federal Republic of Yugoslavia) B Jovanović	2	3

Quarterfinals
(South Africa) P Cramer (United States) M Estep	7	6
(United States) R Lutz (United States) S Smith	6	4

==== Section 4 ====
First round

Second round
(United States) T Edlefsen (United States) T Leonard	4	7	6
(Australia) B Carmichael (Australia) R Ruffels	6	6	4
(South Africa) R Moore (New Zealand) O Parun	4	7	3
7	(Chile) P Cornejo (Chile) J Fillol	6	6	6
(United States) J Borowiak (Soviet Union) A Metreveli	w/o
(Spain) J Gisbert Sr. (United Kingdom) R Taylor
(United States) E Dibbs (United States) H Solomon	w/o
1	(Australia) O Davidson (Australia) J Newcombe

Third round
(United States) T Edlefsen (United States) T Leonard	6	6
7	(Chile) P Cornejo (Chile) J Fillol	4	4
(United States) J Borowiak (Soviet Union) A Metreveli	4	6	6
(United States) E Dibbs (United States) H Solomon	6	3	2

Quarterfinals
(United States) T Edlefsen (United States) T Leonard	4	6	6
(United States) J Borowiak (Soviet Union) A Metreveli	6	4	4
