= 1973 Mississippi Indoors =

- Date: March 22–25
- Edition: 1st
- Category: USLTA Indoor circuit
- Draw: 16S / 8D
- Prize money: $12,500
- Surface: Carpet / indoor
- Location: Jackson, Mississippi, U.S.
- Venue: Mississippi Coliseum

Champions

Singles
- (United States) Eddie Dibbs

Doubles
- (United States) Zan Guerry / (South Africa) Frew McMillan
Tennis South Invitational	· 1974 →

The 1973 Mississippi Indoors, also known by its full name Mississippi International Indoor Tennis Championships, was a men's tennis tournament played on indoor carpet courts at the Mississippi Coliseum in Jackson, Mississippi in the United States that was part of the 1973 USLTA Indoor Circuit. It was the inaugural edition of the tournament and was held from March 22 through March 25, 1973. Eddie Dibbs won the singles title and earned $3,000 first-prize money.

== Finals ==
=== Singles ===
(United States) Eddie Dibbs defeated (South Africa) Frew McMillan 5–7, 6–1, 7–5

- It was Dibbs' first singles title of his career.

=== Doubles ===
(United States) Zan Guerry / (South Africa) Frew McMillan defeated (Chile) Jaime Pinto-Bravo / (Argentina) Tito Vázquez 6–2, 6–4
