= 1977 Tennis South Invitational =

- Date: April 17–21
- Edition: 5th
- Category: Independent
- Draw: 16S / 8D
- Prize money: $58,000
- Surface: Carpet / indoor
- Location: Jackson, Mississippi, U.S.
- Venue: Mississippi Coliseum

Champions

Singles
- (United States) Brian Teacher

Doubles
- (South Africa) Bob Hewitt / (South Africa) Frew McMillan
- Tennis South Invitational

The 1977 Tennis South Invitational was a men's tennis tournament played on indoor carpet courts at the Mississippi Coliseum in Jackson, Mississippi in the United States. It was an independent event, i.e. not part of any tennis tour or circuit. It was the fifth and last edition of the tournament and was held from April 4 through April 9, 1977. Unseeded Brian Teacher won the singles title and earned $12,000 first-prize money after defeating second-seeded Bill Scanlon in the final.

== Finals ==
=== Singles ===
(United States) Brian Teacher defeated (United States) Bill Scanlon 6–3, 6–3

- It was Teacher's first singles title of his career.

=== Doubles ===
(South Africa) Bob Hewitt / (South Africa) Frew McMillan defeated (Australia) Phil Dent / (Australia) Ken Rosewall 6–2, 7–6
