= 1973 Des Moines International =

Tennis tournament

- Date: January 29 – February 2
- Edition: 3rd
- Category: USLTA Indoor Circuit
- Draw: 16S / 8D
- Prize money: $15,000
- Surface: Carpet / indoor
- Location: Des Moines, Iowa, U.S.
- Venue: Veterans Memorial Auditorium

Champions

Singles
- (United States) Clark Graebner

Doubles
- (Czechoslovakia) Jiří Hřebec / (Czechoslovakia) Jan Kukal
← 1972 ·	Des Moines Open

The 1973 Des Moines International was a men's tennis tournament played on indoor carpet courts at the Veterans Memorial Auditorium in Des Moines, Iowa in the United States that was part of the 1973 USLTA Indoor Circuit. It was the third and last edition of the event and was held from January 29 through February 2, 1973. Third-seeded Clark Graebner won the singles title and earned $3,000 first-prize money.

== Finals ==
=== Singles ===
(United States) Clark Graebner defeated (Greece) Nicholas Kalogeropoulos 7–5, 4–6, 6–4

- It was Graebner's only singles title of the year and the fourth of his career in the Open Era.

=== Doubles ===
(Czechoslovakia) Jiří Hřebec / (Czechoslovakia) Jan Kukal defeated (Spain) Juan Gisbert Sr. / (Romania) Ion Țiriac 4–6, 7–6, 6–1
