= 1973 Canadian Indoor Championships =

- Date: 12–17 February
- Edition: 1st
- Category: USLTA Indoor Circuit
- Draw: 28S / 14D
- Prize money: $20,000
- Surface: Hard / indoor
- Location: Calgary, Alberta, Canada
- Venue: Glenmore Racquet Club

Champions

Singles
- (Romania) Ilie Năstase

Doubles
- (United States) Mike Estep / (Romania) Ilie Năstase
Calgary Indoor	· 1974 →

The 1973 Canadian Indoor Championships was a men's tennis tournament played on indoor hard courts that was part of the 1973 USLTA Indoor Circuit and took place at the Glenmore Racquet Club in Calgary, Alberta in Canada. It was the inaugural edition of the tournament and was held from 12 February through 17 February 1973. First-seeded Ilie Năstase won the singles title which earned him $3,000 first-prize money.

== Finals ==
=== Singles ===
(Romania) Ilie Năstase defeated (United States) Paul Gerken 6–4, 7–6^{(5–4)}

- It was Năstase's 2nd singles title of the year and the 26th of his career.

=== Doubles ===
(United States) Mike Estep / (Romania) Ilie Năstase defeated (Hungary) Szabolcs Baranyi / (Hungary) Péter Szőke 6–7, 7–5, 6–3
