= 1973 Baltimore International =

- Date: January 3–7
- Edition: 2nd
- Category: USLTA Indoor Circuit
- Draw: 16S / 8D
- Prize money: $15,000
- Surface: Carpet / indoor
- Location: Baltimore, MD, U.S.
- Venue: Towson State College

Champions

Singles
- (United States) Jimmy Connors

Doubles
- (United States) Jimmy Connors / (United States) Clark Graebner
← 1972 ·	Baltimore International	· 1974 →

The 1973 Baltimore International was a men's tennis tournament played on indoor carpet courts at the Towson State College in Baltimore, Maryland in the United States that was part of the 1973 USLTA Indoor Circuit. It was the second edition of the event and was held from January 3 through January 7, 1973. First-seeded Jimmy Connors won the singles title and earned $3,500 first-prize money.

== Finals ==
=== Singles ===
(United States) Jimmy Connors defeated (United States) Sandy Mayer 6–4, 7–5

- It was Connors' 1st singles title of the year and the 7th of his career.

=== Doubles ===
(United States) Jimmy Connors / (United States) Clark Graebner defeated (United States) Sandy Mayer / (United States) Paul Gerken 3–6, 6–2, 6–3
