= 1973 Coliseum Mall International – Doubles =

Tennis tournament event

Doubles
- 1973 Coliseum Mall International

Final
- Champion: (United States) Clark Graebner (Romania) Ilie Năstase
- Runner-up: (United States) Jimmy Connors (Romania) Ion Țiriac
- Score: 6–2, 6–1

Details
- Draw: 16
- Seeds: 2

Events
Singles	Doubles
← 1972 ·	Hampton Grand Prix	· 1974 →

The 1973 Coliseum Mall International – Doubles was an event of the 1973 Coliseum Mall International tennis tournament. Ilie Năstase and Ion Țiriac were the defending champions, but did not compete together in this edition. Second-seeded Clark Graebner and Ilie Năstase won the doubles title, defeating Jimmy Connors and Ion Țiriac in the final, 6–2, 6–1 .

== Seeds ==
1. (West Germany) Jürgen Fassbender / (Spain) Juan Gisbert Sr. (semifinals)
2. (United States) Clark Graebner / (Romania) Ilie Năstase (champions)

== Draw ==
=== Key ===
- Q = Qualifier
- WC = Wild card
- LL = Lucky loser
- Alt = Alternate
- SE = Special exempt
- PR = Protected ranking
- ITF = ITF entry
- JE = Junior exempt
- w/o = Walkover
- r = Retired
- d = Defaulted
- SR = Special ranking

First Round
1	(West Germany) Jürgen Fassbender (Spain) Juan Gisbert Sr.	6	6
(South Africa) Pat Cramer (Austria) Hans Kary	2	1
(Greece) Nicholas Kalogeropoulos (Chile) Jaime Pinto Bravo	6	3	6
(Australia) John Cooper (Australia) Ian Fletcher	2	6	1
(United States) Jimmy Connors (Romania) Ion Țiriac	6	7
(South Africa) Byron Bertram (Italy) Martin Mulligan	3	5
(United States) Zan Guerry (United States) Harold Solomon	7	6
(West Germany) Karl Meiler	6	3
(Hungary) Szabolcs Baranyi (Hungary) Péter Szőke	6	6
(United States) Augera (United States) Quimbaya	1	1
(New Zealand) Ian Crookenden (Romania) Adrian Marcu	6^{3}	3
(United States) Mike Estep (United States) Charles Owens	7^{7}	6
(United States) Paul Gerken (United States) Sandy Mayer	6	3	6
(United Kingdom) John Paish (United States) Butch Seewagen	2	6	1
(United States) Eddie Dibbs (United States) Sherwood Stewart	4	5
2	(United States) Clark Graebner (Romania) Ilie Năstase	6	7

Quarterfinals
1	(West Germany) Jürgen Fassbender (Spain) Juan Gisbert Sr.	6	6
(Greece) Nicholas Kalogeropoulos (Chile) Jaime Pinto Bravo	3	4
(United States) Jimmy Connors (Romania) Ion Țiriac	6	7
(United States) Zan Guerry (United States) Harold Solomon	3	5
(Hungary) Szabolcs Baranyi (Hungary) Péter Szőke	2	2
(United States) Mike Estep (United States) Charles Owens	6	6
(United States) Paul Gerken (United States) Sandy Mayer	2	3
2	(United States) Clark Graebner (Romania) Ilie Năstase	6	6

Semifinals
1	(West Germany) Jürgen Fassbender (Spain) Juan Gisbert Sr.	1^{r}
(United States) Jimmy Connors (Romania) Ion Țiriac	5
(United States) Mike Estep (United States) Charles Owens	3	1
2	(United States) Clark Graebner (Romania) Ilie Năstase	6	6

Final
(United States) Jimmy Connors (Romania) Ion Țiriac	2	1
2	(United States) Clark Graebner (Romania) Ilie Năstase	6	6
