= Canadian Indoor Tennis Championships =

1973–74 tennis tournament in Canada

Defunct tennis tournament
- Tour: USLTA Indoor Circuit
- Founded: 1973
- Abolished: 1974
- Editions: 2
- Location: Calgary, Alberta, Canada
- Venue: Glenmore Racquet Club
- Surface: Carpet / indoor

The Canadian Indoor Tennis Championships is a defunct professional men's tennis tournament that was part of the USLTA Indoor Circuit from 1973 to 1974. Also informally called the Calgary Indoor, the event was held at the Glenmore Racquet Club in Calgary, Alberta, Canada, and was played on indoor carpet courts.

== Finals ==
=== Singles ===
Year	Champions	Runners-up	Score
1973	(Romania) Ilie Năstase	(United States) Paul Gerken	6–4, 7–6^{(5–4)}
1974	(Germany) Karl Meiler	(South Africa) Byron Bertram	6–4, 3–6, 6–3

=== Doubles ===
Year	Champions	Runners-up	Score
1973	(United States) Mike Estep (Romania) Ilie Năstase	(Hungary) Szabolcs Baranyi (Hungary) Péter Szőke	6–7, 7–5, 6–3
1974	(Germany) Jürgen Fassbender (Germany) Karl Meiler	(Colombia) Iván Molina (Colombia) Jairo Velasco Sr.	6–4, 6–4
