= 1976 Tennis South Invitational =

- Date: March 17–21
- Edition: 4th
- Category: World Championship Tennis
- Draw: 16S / 8D
- Prize money: $60,000
- Surface: Carpet / indoor
- Location: Jackson, Mississippi, U.S.
- Venue: Mississippi Coliseum

Champions

Singles
- (Australia) Ken Rosewall

Doubles
- (United States) Brian Gottfried / (Mexico) Raúl Ramírez
- Tennis South Invitational

The 1976 Tennis South Invitational was a men's tennis tournament played on indoor carpet courts at the Mississippi Coliseum in Jackson, Mississippi in the United States that was part of the 1976 World Championship Tennis circuit. It was the fourth edition of the tournament and was held from March 17 through March 21, 1976. First-seeded Ken Rosewall won his second consecutive singles title at the event and earned $17,000 first-prize money after defeating second-seeded Raúl Ramírez in the final.

== Finals ==
=== Singles ===
(Australia) Ken Rosewall defeated (Mexico) Raúl Ramírez 6–3, 6–3

- It was Rosewall's 2nd singles title of the year and the 40th of his career in the Open Era.

=== Doubles ===
(United States) Brian Gottfried / (Mexico) Raúl Ramírez defeated (Australia) Ross Case / (Australia) Geoff Masters 7–5, 4–6, 6–0
