= 1973 Coliseum Mall International – Singles =

Tennis tournament event

Singles
- 1973 Coliseum Mall International

Final
- Champion: (United States) Jimmy Connors
- Runner-up: (Romania) Ilie Năstase
- Score: 4–6, 6–3, 7–5, 6–3

Details
- Draw: 32

Events
Singles	Doubles
← 1972 ·	Hampton Grand Prix	· 1974 →

The 1973 Coliseum Mall International – Singles was an event of the 1973 Coliseum Mall International men's tennis tournament that was played at the Hampton Roads Coliseum in Hampton, Virginia in the United States from February 26 through March 3, 1973. Stan Smith was the defending champion, but did not compete in this edition. Second-seeded Jimmy Connors won the singles title, defeating Ilie Năstase 4–6, 6–3, 7–5, 6–3 in the final.

== Seeds ==
1. (Romania) Ilie Năstase (Final)
2. (United States) Jimmy Connors (Champion)

== Draw ==
=== Key ===
- Q = Qualifier
- WC = Wild card
- LL = Lucky loser
- Alt = Alternate
- SE = Special exempt
- PR = Protected ranking
- ITF = ITF entry
- JE = Junior exempt
- w/o = Walkover
- r = Retired
- d = Defaulted
- SR = Special ranking

=== Finals ===
Semifinals
1	(Romania) Ilie Năstase	6	6
(United States) Mike Estep	4	3
(United States) Paul Gerken	6^{4}	4
2	(United States) Jimmy Connors	7^{7}	6

Final
1	(Romania) Ilie Năstase	6	3	5	3
2	(United States) Jimmy Connors	4	6	7	6

=== Top half ===
First Round
1	(Romania) Ilie Năstase	4	6	6
(United States) Zan Guerry	6	0	2
(Romania) Gavorielle Marcu	1	2
(South Africa) Pat Cramer	6	6
(United States) Charles Owens	1	1
(United States) Sherwood Stewart	6	6
(Australia) John Cooper	1	2
(United States) Harold Solomon	6	6
(Spain) Juan Gisbert Sr.	6	6
(United States) Butch Seewagen	0	3
(Chile) Jaime Pinto Bravo	2	3
(United States) Mike Estep	6	6
(United States) Brian Gottfried	1	6	6
(Greece) Nicholas Kalogeropoulos	6	3	3
(Austria) Hans Kary	4	2
(United States) Sandy Mayer	6	6

Second Round
1	(Romania) Ilie Năstase	6	6
(South Africa) Pat Cramer	2	4
(United States) Sherwood Stewart	6	6^{2}	7^{7}
(United States) Harold Solomon	1	7^{7}	6^{4}
(Spain) Juan Gisbert Sr.	4	6	6^{0}
(United States) Mike Estep	6	3	7^{7}
(United States) Brian Gottfried	6	6
(United States) Sandy Mayer	1	4

Quarterfinals
1	(Romania) Ilie Năstase	6	7^{7}
(United States) Sherwood Stewart	4	6^{5}
(United States) Mike Estep	6	6
(United States) Brian Gottfried	1	0

Semifinals
1	(Romania) Ilie Năstase	6	6
(United States) Mike Estep	4	3

=== Bottom half ===
First Round
(Germany) Karl Meiler	6	6
(Italy) Martin Mulligan	0	4
(Argentina) Tito Vázquez	3	2
(United States) Paul Gerken	6	6
(United States) Eddie Dibbs	6	6
(United States) Bill Shivar	1	1
(Hungary) Szabolcs Baranyi	4	1
(United States) Clark Graebner	6	6
(Germany) Jürgen Fassbender	6	6
(United Kingdom) John Paish	4	1
(Australia) Ian Fletcher	6	4	5
(Romania) Ion Țiriac	1	6	4^{r}
(Hungary) Péter Szőke	6	6
(New Zealand) Ian Crookenden	1	3
(South Africa) Byron Bertram	3	3
2	(United States) Jimmy Connors	6	6

Second Round
(Germany) Karl Meiler	4	0
(United States) Paul Gerken	6	6
(United States) Eddie Dibbs	1	5
(United States) Clark Graebner	6	7
(Germany) Jürgen Fassbender	6	2	6
(Australia) Ian Fletcher	2	6	0
(Hungary) Péter Szőke	4	0
2	(United States) Jimmy Connors	6	6

Quarterfinals
(United States) Paul Gerken	6	6^{0}	6
(United States) Clark Graebner	4	7^{7}	4
(Germany) Jürgen Fassbender	4	2
2	(United States) Jimmy Connors	6	6

Semifinals
(United States) Paul Gerken	6^{4}	4
2	(United States) Jimmy Connors	7^{7}	6
