= 1974 U.S. Professional Indoor =

- Date: January 21–27
- Edition: 7th
- Category: World Championship Tennis
- Draw: 84S / 64D
- Prize money: $100,000
- Surface: Carpet / indoor
- Location: Philadelphia, PA, United States
- Venue: Spectrum

Champions

Singles
- (Australia) Rod Laver

Doubles
- (South Africa) Pat Cramer / (United States) Mike Estep
← 1973 ·	U.S. Professional Indoor	· 1975 →

The 1974 U.S. Professional Indoor was a men's tennis tournament that was part of the WCT circuit and played on indoor carpet courts at the Spectrum in Philadelphia, Pennsylvania in the United States. It was the seventh edition of the tournament and was held from January 21 through January 27, 1974. Sixth-seeded Rod Laver won the singles title, his fourth at the event after 1969, 1970 and 1972.

== Finals ==
=== Singles ===
(Australia) Rod Laver defeated (United States) Arthur Ashe 6–1, 6–4, 3–6, 6–4

- It was Laver's 1st title of the year and the 52nd of his open era career.

=== Doubles ===
(South Africa) Pat Cramer / (United States) Mike Estep defeated (France) Jean-Baptiste Chanfreau / (France) Georges Goven 6–1, 6–1

- It was Cramer's only title of the year and the 2nd of his career. It was Estep's only title of the year and the 7th of his career.
