= Tempe Tennis Classic =

Grand Prix tennis tournament played in 1974

Defunct tennis tournament
- Tour: USLTA Indoor Circuit
- Founded: 1974
- Abolished: 1974
- Editions: 1
- Location: Tempe, Arizona, United States
- Venue: University Activity Center,, Arizona State University
- Surface: Carpet / indoor

The Tempe Tennis Classic was a men's ILTF/USLTA affiliated indoor carpet court tennis tournament that was played as part of the ILTF Independent Circuit in late March, 1974. Also known by its sponsored name the Rotary-Schick Tennis Classic the event was played at the University Activity Center (now known as Desert Financial Arena), Arizona State University, Tempe, Arizona, United States.

Jimmy Connors won the singles title while Jürgen Fassbender and Karl Meiler partnered to win the doubles title.

This event carried ATP ranking points, though lower than the main Grand Prix circuit.

== Past Finals ==
=== Singles ===
Year	Champion	Runner-up	Score
1974	(United States) Jimmy Connors	(India) Vijay Amritraj	6–1, 6–2

=== Doubles ===
Year	Champion	Runner-up	Score
1974	(Germany) Jürgen Fassbender (Germany) Karl Meiler	(Australia) Ian Fletcher (Australia) Kim Warwick	4–6, 6–4, 7–5

== Sources ==
- Singles Draw
- Doubles Draw
