= 1974 Mississippi Indoors =

- Date: March 20–24
- Edition: 2nd
- Category: USLTA Indoor circuit
- Draw: 24S / 12D
- Prize money: $20,000
- Surface: Carpet / indoor
- Location: Jackson, Mississippi, U.S.
- Venue: Mississippi Coliseum

Champions

Singles
- (United States) Sandy Mayer

Doubles
- (United States) Fred McNair / (United States) Grover Raz Reid
- Tennis South Invitational

The 1974 Mississippi Indoors, also known by its full name Mississippi International Indoor Tennis Championships, was a men's tennis tournament played on indoor carpet courts at the Mississippi Coliseum in Jackson, Mississippi in the United States that was part of the 1974 USLTA Indoor Circuit. It was the second edition of the tournament and was held from March 20 through March 24, 1974. Second-seeded Sandy Mayer won the singles title after defeating first-seeded Karl Meiler in the final. Mayer was still an amateur and therefore not entitled to receive first-prize money.

== Finals ==
=== Singles ===
(United States) Sandy Mayer defeated (West Germany) Karl Meiler 7–6^{(5–2)}, 7–5

- It was Mayer's 3rd singles title of the year and the 4th of his career.

=== Doubles ===
(United States) Fred McNair / (United States) Grover Raz Reid defeated (South Africa) Byron Bertram / (United Kingdom) John Feaver 3–6, 6–3, 6–3
