= 1973 Midlands International =

- Date: January 23–28
- Edition: 5th
- Category: USLTA Indoor Circuit
- Draw: 25S / 12D
- Prize money: $15,000
- Surface: Carpet / indoor
- Location: Omaha, Nebraska, U.S.
- Venue: City Auditorium

Champions

Singles
- (Romania) Ilie Năstase

Doubles
- (United States) Ilie Năstase / (United States) Mike Estep
← 1972 ·	Omaha Open	· 1974 →

The 1973 Midlands International, also known as the Omaha International, was a men's tennis tournament played on indoor carpet courts at the City Auditorium in Omaha, Nebraska in the United States that was part of the 1973 USLTA Indoor Circuit. It was the fifth edition of the event and was held from January 23 through January 28, 1973. First-seeded Ilie Năstase won the singles title and earned $3,000 first-prize money after his opponent in the final, Jimmy Connors, retired with an ankle injury which he sustained in the semifinal. It was Năstase's third consecutive singles title at the event.

== Finals ==
=== Singles ===
(Romania) Ilie Năstase defeated (United States) Jimmy Connors 5–0 ret.

- It was Năstase's 1st singles title of the year and 25th of his career.

=== Doubles ===
(United States) William Brown / (United States) Mike Estep defeated (United States) Jimmy Connors / (Spain) Juan Gisbert, Sr. default (Note: Due to his injury Connors had to default from the doubles final. Instead of the final an exhibition match was played in which Connors was replaced by Ion Țiriac. He and Juan Gisbert, Sr. won the match against William Brown and Mike Estep in two sets, 6–3, 6–3.)
