= 1973 Birmingham International =

- Date: January 17–20
- Edition: 1st
- Category: USLTA Indoor Circuit
- Draw: 16S / 9D
- Prize money: $15,000
- Surface: Carpet / indoor
- Location: Birmingham, Alabama, U.S.
- Venue: Birmingham Municipal Auditorium

Champions

Singles
- (United States) Sandy Mayer

Doubles
- (West Germany) Jürgen Fassbender / (South Africa) Pat Cramer
ATP Birmingham	· 1974 →

The 1973 Birmingham International was a men's tennis tournament played on indoor carpet courts at the Birmingham Municipal Auditorium in Birmingham, Alabama, in the United States that was part of the 1973 USLTA Indoor Circuit. It was the inaugural edition of the event and was held from January 17 through January 20, 1973. Unseeded Sandy Mayer won the singles title but due to his amateur status he was not entitled to receive the $3,000 first-prize money.

== Finals ==
=== Singles ===
(United States) Sandy Mayer defeated (United States) Charlie Owens 6–4, 7–6

- It was Mayer's first singles title of his career.

=== Doubles ===
(West Germany) Jürgen Fassbender / (South Africa) Pat Cramer defeated (Romania) Ion Țiriac / (United States) Clark Graebner 6–4, 7–5
