= 1974 USLTA Indoor Circuit =

American tennis competition

Details
- Duration: 17 January – 4 April
- Edition: 4th
- Tournaments: 13

Achievements (singles)
- Most titles: (United States) Jimmy Connors (7)
- Most finals: (United States) Jimmy Connors (8)

The 1974 USLTA Indoor Circuit , also known by its sponsored name Schick Tennis Classic, was a professional tennis circuit held in the United States from January until April that year. It consisted of 13 tournaments and was organized by Bill Riordan and sanctioned by the United States Lawn Tennis Association (USLTA). The circuit offered total prize money of over $400,000 including a bonus pool of $100,000 available for the top eight players who participated in at least six tournaments.

== Schedule ==
=== January ===
Week of	Tournament	Champion	Runner-up	Semifinalists	Quarterfinalists
17 Jan	Roanoke International; Roanoke, Virginia, U.S. Carpet (i) – $20,000 – 16S	(United States) Jimmy Connors; 6–4, 6–3	(West Germany) Karl Meiler	(United States) Vitas Gerulaitis (India) Vijay Amritraj	(Colombia) Iván Molina (New Zealand) Ian Crookenden (Australia) Ian Fletcher (United States) Jeff Austin
17 Jan	Roanoke International; Roanoke, Virginia, U.S. Carpet (i) – $20,000 – 16S	(United States) Vitas Gerulaitis (United States) Sandy Mayer; 7–6, 6–1	(New Zealand) Ian Crookenden (New Zealand) Jeff Simpson	(United States) Vitas Gerulaitis (India) Vijay Amritraj	(Colombia) Iván Molina (New Zealand) Ian Crookenden (Australia) Ian Fletcher (United States) Jeff Austin
21 Jan	Midlands International; Omaha, Nebraska, U.S. Carpet (i) – $20,000 – 32S/16D	(West Germany) Karl Meiler; 6–3, 1–6, 6–1	(United States) Jimmy Connors	(United States) William Brown (New Zealand) Ian Crookenden	(Australia) Ian Fletcher (South Africa) Byron Bertram (India) Vijay Amritraj (United States) Jeff Austin
21 Jan	Midlands International; Omaha, Nebraska, U.S. Carpet (i) – $20,000 – 32S/16D	(West Germany) Jürgen Fassbender (West Germany) Karl Meiler; 6–2, 6–4	(Australia) Ian Fletcher (Australia) Kim Warwick	(United States) William Brown (New Zealand) Ian Crookenden	(Australia) Ian Fletcher (South Africa) Byron Bertram (India) Vijay Amritraj (United States) Jeff Austin

=== February ===
Week of	Tournament	Champion	Runner-up	Semifinalists	Quarterfinalists
2 Feb	Baltimore International Indoors; Baltimore, Maryland, U.S. Hard – $20,000 – 24S/12D	(United States) Sandy Mayer; 6–2, 6–1	(United States) Clark Graebner	(West Germany) Jürgen Fassbender (United States) Charlie Owens	(India) Vijay Amritraj (United States) Jeff Austin (South Africa) Byron Bertram (Australia) Kim Warwick
2 Feb	Baltimore International Indoors; Baltimore, Maryland, U.S. Hard – $20,000 – 24S/12D	(West Germany) Jürgen Fassbender (West Germany) Karl Meiler; 7–6, 7–5	(Australia) Owen Davidson (United States) Clark Graebner	(West Germany) Jürgen Fassbender (United States) Charlie Owens	(India) Vijay Amritraj (United States) Jeff Austin (South Africa) Byron Bertram (Australia) Kim Warwick
10 Feb	Arkansas International; Little Rock, Arkansas, U.S. Hard – $20,000 – 32S/16D	(United States) Jimmy Connors; 6–2, 6–1	(West Germany) Karl Meiler	(United States) Vitas Gerulaitis (Australia) Kim Warwick	(Australia) Ian Fletcher (South Africa) Byron Bertram (United States) Dick R. Bohrnstedt (Romania) Toma Ovici
10 Feb	Arkansas International; Little Rock, Arkansas, U.S. Hard – $20,000 – 32S/16D	(West Germany) Jürgen Fassbender (West Germany) Karl Meiler; 6–0, 6–2	(United States) Vitas Gerulaitis (South Africa) Bob Hewitt	(United States) Vitas Gerulaitis (Australia) Kim Warwick	(Australia) Ian Fletcher (South Africa) Byron Bertram (United States) Dick R. Bohrnstedt (Romania) Toma Ovici
11 Feb	Birmingham International; Birmingham, Alabama, U.S. Carpet (i) – $25,000 – 17S/9D	(United States) Jimmy Connors; 7–5, 6–3	(United States) Sandy Mayer	(United States) Charlie Owens (West Germany) Karl Meiler	(Chile) Belus Prajoux (West Germany) Jürgen Fassbender (United States) Jeff Simpson (Australia) Ian Fletcher
11 Feb	Birmingham International; Birmingham, Alabama, U.S. Carpet (i) – $25,000 – 17S/9D	(Australia) Ian Fletcher (United States) Sandy Mayer; 7–5, 6–7, 6–3	(Greece) Nicholas Kalogeropoulos (Colombia) Iván Molina	(United States) Charlie Owens (West Germany) Karl Meiler	(Chile) Belus Prajoux (West Germany) Jürgen Fassbender (United States) Jeff Simpson (Australia) Ian Fletcher
19 Feb	U.S. Indoor Championships; Salisbury, Maryland, U.S. Carpet (i) – $50,000 – 58S/22D	(United States) Jimmy Connors; 6–4, 7–5, 6–3	(South Africa) Frew McMillan	(United States) Sandy Mayer (United States) Jim Delaney	(Australia) Ian Fletcher (United States) Robert Kreiss (Socialist Federal Republic of Yugoslavia) Nikola Pilić (France) Pierre Barthès
19 Feb	U.S. Indoor Championships; Salisbury, Maryland, U.S. Carpet (i) – $50,000 – 58S/22D	(United States) Jimmy Connors (South Africa) Frew McMillan; 7–5, 6–2	(South Africa) Byron Bertram (Rhodesia) Andrew Pattison	(United States) Sandy Mayer (United States) Jim Delaney	(Australia) Ian Fletcher (United States) Robert Kreiss (Socialist Federal Republic of Yugoslavia) Nikola Pilić (France) Pierre Barthès

=== March ===
Week of	Tournament	Champion	Runner-up	Semifinalists	Quarterfinalists
3 Mar	Garcia Tennis Classic; Paramus, New Jersey, U.S. Hard – 16S/8D	(United States) Sandy Mayer; 6–1, 6–3	(West Germany) Jürgen Fassbender	(Australia) Ian Fletcher (India) Vijay Amritraj	(United States) Jeff Austin (United States) Vitas Gerulaitis (Colombia) Iván Molina (United States) Charles Owens
10 Mar	Coliseum Mall International; Hampton, Virginia, U.S. Carpet (i) – $35,000 – 39S/11D	(United States) Jimmy Connors; 6–4, 6–4	(Romania) Ilie Năstase	(Hungary) Balázs Taróczy (Socialist Federal Republic of Yugoslavia) Nikola Pilić	(Austria) Hans Kary (West Germany) Jürgen Fassbender (France) Georges Goven (United States) Billy Martin
10 Mar	Coliseum Mall International; Hampton, Virginia, U.S. Carpet (i) – $35,000 – 39S/11D	(Socialist Federal Republic of Yugoslavia) Željko Franulović (Socialist Federal Republic of Yugoslavia) Nikola Pilić; 4–6, 7–5, 6–1	(South Africa) Pat Cramer (United States) Mike Estep	(Hungary) Balázs Taróczy (Socialist Federal Republic of Yugoslavia) Nikola Pilić	(Austria) Hans Kary (West Germany) Jürgen Fassbender (France) Georges Goven (United States) Billy Martin
17 Mar	Canadian Indoor Championships; Calgary, Alberta, Canada; Hard (i) – $25,000 – 32S/16D	(West Germany) Karl Meiler; 6–4, 3–6, 6–3	(South Africa) Byron Bertram	(Colombia) Jairo Velasco Sr (New Zealand) Ian Crookenden	(Australia) Kim Warwick (United States) Dick R. Bohrnstedt (Hungary) Balázs Taróczy (Spain) José Higueras
17 Mar	Canadian Indoor Championships; Calgary, Alberta, Canada; Hard (i) – $25,000 – 32S/16D	(West Germany) Jürgen Fassbender (West Germany) Karl Meiler; 6–4, 6–4	(Colombia) Iván Molina (Colombia) Jairo Velasco Sr	(Colombia) Jairo Velasco Sr (New Zealand) Ian Crookenden	(Australia) Kim Warwick (United States) Dick R. Bohrnstedt (Hungary) Balázs Taróczy (Spain) José Higueras
18 Mar	American Savings International; Salt Lake City, Utah, U.S. Hard – 24S/12D	(United States) Jimmy Connors; 4–6, 7–6, 6–3	(United States) Vitas Gerulaitis	(United States) Dick R. Bohrnstedt (United States) Billy Martin	(Colombia) Jairo Velasco Sr (United States) Jim Osborne (New Zealand) Ian Crookenden (West Germany) Jürgen Fassbender
18 Mar	American Savings International; Salt Lake City, Utah, U.S. Hard – 24S/12D	(United States) Jimmy Connors (United States) Vitas Gerulaitis; 2–6, 7–6, 7–5	(Colombia) Iván Molina (Colombia) Jairo Velasco Sr	(United States) Dick R. Bohrnstedt (United States) Billy Martin	(Colombia) Jairo Velasco Sr (United States) Jim Osborne (New Zealand) Ian Crookenden (West Germany) Jürgen Fassbender
24 Mar	Rotary-Schick Tennis Classic; Tempe, Arizona, U.S. Carpet – 32S/16D	(United States) Jimmy Connors; 6–1, 6–2	(India) Vijay Amritraj	(West Germany) Jürgen Fassbender (South Africa) Byron Bertram	(Australia) Ian Fletcher (United States) Charles Owens (United States) Jeff Austin (United States) Vitas Gerulaitis
24 Mar	Rotary-Schick Tennis Classic; Tempe, Arizona, U.S. Carpet – 32S/16D	(West Germany) Jürgen Fassbender (West Germany) Karl Meiler; 6–4, 3–6, 7–6	(Australia) Ian Fletcher (Australia) Kim Warwick	(West Germany) Jürgen Fassbender (South Africa) Byron Bertram	(Australia) Ian Fletcher (United States) Charles Owens (United States) Jeff Austin (United States) Vitas Gerulaitis
24 Mar	Mississippi Indoors; Jackson, Mississippi, U.S. Carpet – 24S/12D	(United States) Sandy Mayer; 7–6^{(5–2)}, 7–5	(West Germany) Karl Meiler	(India) Vijay Amritraj (Australia) Kim Warwick	(New Zealand) Jeff Simpson (Australia) Syd Ball (United States) Grover Raz Reid (United States) Charles Owens
24 Mar	Mississippi Indoors; Jackson, Mississippi, U.S. Carpet – 24S/12D	(United States) Fred McNair (United States) Grover Raz Reid; 3–6, 6–3, 6–3	(South Africa) Byron Bertram (United Kingdom) John Feaver	(India) Vijay Amritraj (Australia) Kim Warwick	(New Zealand) Jeff Simpson (Australia) Syd Ball (United States) Grover Raz Reid (United States) Charles Owens

=== April ===
Week of	Tournament	Champion	Runner-up	Semifinalists	Quarterfinalists
4 Apr	Equity Funding Championship; Washington D.C., U.S. Carpet – 32S	(India) Vijay Amritraj; 6–4, 6–3	(West Germany) Karl Meiler	(United States) Jimmy Connors (United States) Charles Owens	(Australia) Ian Fletcher (South Africa) Byron Bertram (New Zealand) Ian Crookenden (United States) Vitas Gerulaitis

== See also ==
- 1974 Grand Prix circuit
- 1974 World Championship Tennis circuit
