= 1972 Des Moines International =

Tennis tournament

- Date: February 4–6
- Edition: 2nd
- Category: USLTA Indoor Circuit
- Draw: 16S / 8D
- Prize money: $15,000
- Surface: Carpet / indoor
- Location: Des Moines, Iowa, U.S.
- Venue: Veterans Memorial Auditorium

Champions

Singles
- (United States) Pancho Gonzales

Doubles
- (United States) Jim Osborne / (United States) Jim McManus
| ← 1971 · | Des Moines Open | · 1973 → |

The 1972 Des Moines International was a men's tennis tournament played on indoor carpet courts at the Veterans Memorial Auditorium in Des Moines, Iowa in the United States that was part of the 1972 USLTA Indoor Circuit. It was the second edition of the event and was held from February 4 through February 6, 1972. Second-seeded Pancho Gonzales won the singles title and earned $3,000 first-prize money.

== Finals ==
=== Singles ===
(United States) Pancho Gonzales defeated (France) Georges Goven 3–6, 4–6, 6–3, 6–4, 6–2

=== Doubles ===
(United States) Jim Osborne / (United States) Jim McManus defeated (France) Georges Goven / (Brazil) Thomaz Koch 6–2, 6–3
