= 1974 U.S. National Indoor Tennis Championships =

- Date: February 18–24
- Edition: 4th
- Category: USLTA Indoor Circuit
- Draw: 58S / 22D
- Prize money: $50,000
- Surface: Carpet / indoor
- Location: Salisbury, Maryland, U.S.
- Venue: Wicomico Youth and Civic Center

Champions

Singles
- (United States) Jimmy Connors

Doubles
- (United States) Jimmy Connors / (South Africa) Frew McMillan
- U.S. National Indoor Championships

The 1974 U.S. National Indoor Tennis Championships was a men's tennis tournament held at the Wicomico Youth and Civic Center in Salisbury, Maryland in the United States. The event was part of the 1974 USLTA Indoor Circuit. The tournament was held from February 18 through February 24, 1974, and played on indoor carpet courts. Second-seeded Jimmy Connors won the singles title and earned $9,000 first-prize money.

== Finals ==
=== Singles ===
(United States) Jimmy Connors defeated (South Africa) Frew McMillan 6–4, 7–5, 6–3

- It was Connor's 5th singles title of the year, and the 22nd of his career.

=== Doubles ===
(United States) Jimmy Connors / (South Africa) Frew McMillan defeated (South Africa) Byron Bertram / (Rhodesia) Andrew Pattison 7–5, 6–2
