= 1973 Coliseum Mall International =

- Date: February 26 – March 3
- Edition: 4th
- Category: USLTA Indoor circuit
- Draw: 32S / 16D
- Prize money: $35,000
- Surface: Carpet / indoor
- Location: Hampton, Virginia, United States
- Venue: Hampton Roads Coliseum

Champions

Singles
- (United States) Jimmy Connors

Doubles
- (United States) Clark Graebner / (Romania) Ilie Năstase
- Hampton Grand Prix

The 1973 Coliseum Mall International, also known as the Hampton Indoor, was a men's tennis tournament played on indoor carpet courts at the Hampton Roads Coliseum in Hampton, Virginia in the United States that was part of the 1973 USLTA Indoor Circuit. It was the fourth edition of the tournament and was held from February 26 through March 3, 1973. First-seeded U.S. player Jimmy Connors won the singles title and earned $10,000 first-prize money.

== Finals ==
=== Singles ===
(United States) Jimmy Connors defeated (Romania) Ilie Năstase 4–6, 6–3, 7–5, 6–3

- It was Connors' 5th singles title of the year and the 11th of his career.

=== Doubles ===
(United States) Clark Graebner / (Romania) Ilie Năstase defeated (United States) Jimmy Connors / (Romania) Ion Țiriac 6–2, 6–1
