= 1973 U.S. National Indoor Tennis Championships =

- Date: February 19–24
- Edition: 3rd
- Category: USLTA Indoor Circuit
- Draw: 64S / 32D
- Prize money: $50,000
- Surface: Hard / indoor
- Location: Salisbury, Maryland, U.S.
- Venue: Wicomico Youth and Civic Center

Champions

Singles
- (United States) Jimmy Connors

Doubles
- (United States) Clark Graebner / (Romania) Ilie Năstase
- U.S. National Indoor Championships

The 1973 U.S. National Indoor Tennis Championships was a men's tennis tournament held at the Wicomico Youth and Civic Center in Salisbury, Maryland in the United States. The event was part of the 1973 USLTA Indoor Circuit. It was the third edition of the tournament and was held from February 19 through February 24, 1994, and played on indoor carpet courts. First-seeded Jimmy Connors won the singles title and $9,000 first-prize money.

== Finals ==
=== Singles ===
(United States) Jimmy Connors defeated (West Germany) Karl Meiler 3–6, 7–6, 7–6, 6–3

- It was Connor's fourth singles title of the year, and the tenth of his career.

=== Doubles ===
(West Germany) Jürgen Fassbender / (Spain) Juan Gisbert, Sr. defeated (United States) Clark Graebner / (Romania) Ilie Năstase 2–6, 6–4, 6–3

== See also ==
- 1973 U.S. Women's Indoor Championships – women's tournament
