= 1974 Midlands International =

- Date: January 22–27
- Edition: 6th
- Category: USLTA Indoor Circuit
- Draw: 24S / 12D
- Prize money: $20,000
- Surface: Carpet / indoor
- Location: Omaha, Nebraska, U.S.
- Venue: City Auditorium

Champions

Singles
- (West Germany) Karl Meiler

Doubles
- (West Germany) Jürgen Fassbender / (West Germany) Karl Meiler
| ← 1973 · | Omaha Open |

The 1974 Midlands International, also known as the Omaha International, was a men's tennis tournament played on indoor carpet courts at the City Auditorium in Omaha, Nebraska in the United States that was part of the 1974 USLTA Indoor Circuit. It was the sixth and last edition of the event and was held from January 22 through January 27, 1974. Third-seeded Karl Meiler won the singles title and earned $4,000 first-prize money.

== Finals ==
=== Singles ===
(West Germany) Karl Meiler defeated (United States) Jimmy Connors 6–3, 1–6, 6–1

- It was Meiler's 1st singles title of the year and 2nd of his career.

=== Doubles ===
(West Germany) Jürgen Fassbender / (West Germany) Karl Meiler defeated (Australia) Ian Fletcher / (Australia) Kim Warwick 6–2, 6–4
