= 1970 South African Open (tennis) =

- Date: 24 March – 4 April
- Edition: 67th
- Category: Independent tour
- Draw: 32S / 32D
- Prize money: $47,000
- Surface: Hard / outdoor
- Location: Johannesburg, South Africa
- Venue: Ellis Park Tennis Stadium

Champions

Men's singles
- (Australia) Rod Laver

Women's singles
- (Australia) Margaret Court

Men's doubles
- (South Africa) Bob Hewitt / (South Africa) Frew McMillan

Women's doubles
- (United States) Billie Jean King / (United States) Rosie Casals

Mixed doubles
- (Australia) Margaret Court / (United States) Marty Riessen
- South African Open

The 1970 South African Open was a combined men's and women's tennis tournament played on outdoor hard courts at Ellis Park in Johannesburg, South Africa. It was an independent tournament that was not part of either of the two main tennis circuits; the 1970 Pepsi-Cola Grand Prix circuit and the 1970 World Championship Tennis circuit. It was the 67th edition of the tournament and was held from 24 March through 4 April 1970. Owen Williams was the tournament director. Rod Laver and Margaret Court won the singles titles.

== Finals ==
=== Men's singles ===
(Australia) Rod Laver defeated (South Africa) Frew McMillan 4–6, 6–2, 6–1, 6–2

=== Women's singles ===
(Australia) Margaret Court defeated (United States) Billie Jean King 6–4, 1–6, 6–3

=== Men's doubles ===
(South Africa) Bob Hewitt / (South Africa) Frew McMillan defeated (South Africa) Cliff Drysdale / (United Kingdom) Roger Taylor 6–3, 6–3, 6–2

=== Women's doubles ===
(United States) Billie Jean King / (United States) Rosie Casals defeated (Australia) Kerry Mellville / (Australia) Karen Krantzcke 6–2, 6–2

=== Mixed doubles ===
(Australia) Margaret Court / (United States) Marty Riessen defeated (South Africa) Pat Walkden / (South Africa) Frew McMillan 7–5, 3–6, 7–5
