= 1972 Baltimore International =

Tennis tournament

- Date: January 7–9
- Edition: 1st
- Category: USLTA Indoor Circuit
- Draw: 16S / 8D
- Prize money: $7,500
- Surface: Carpet / indoor
- Location: Baltimore, MD, U.S.
- Venue: Towson State College

Champions

Singles
- (Romania) Ilie Năstase

Doubles
- (United States) Jimmy Connors / (Pakistan) Haroon Rahim
Baltimore International	· 1973 →

The 1972 Baltimore International was a men's tennis tournament played on indoor carpet courts at the Towson State College in Baltimore, Maryland in the United States that was part of the 1972 USLTA Indoor Circuit. It was the inaugural edition of the event and was held from January 7 through January 9, 1972. Second-seeded Ilie Năstase won the singles title and earned $2,550 first-prize money.

== Finals ==
=== Singles ===
(Romania) Ilie Năstase defeated (United States) Jimmy Connors 1–6, 6–4, 7–6^{(5–1)}

- It was Năstase's 1st singles title of the year and the 10th of his career.

=== Doubles ===
(United States) Jimmy Connors / (Pakistan) Haroon Rahim defeated (France) Pierre Barthès / (United States) Clark Graebner 6–3, 3–6, 6–3
