= 1972 Midlands International =

- Date: January 26–30
- Edition: 4th
- Category: USLTA Indoor Circuit
- Draw: 16S / 8D
- Prize money: $15,000
- Surface: Carpet / indoor
- Location: Omaha, Nebraska, U.S.
- Venue: City Auditorium

Champions

Singles
- (Romania) Ilie Năstase

Doubles
- (Romania) Ilie Năstase / (Romania) Ion Țiriac
← 1971 ·	Omaha Open	· 1973 →

The 1972 Midlands International, also known as the Omaha International, was a men's tennis tournament played on indoor carpet courts at the City Auditorium in Omaha, Nebraska, in the United States that was part of the 1972 USLTA Indoor Circuit. It was the fourth edition of the event and was held from January 26 through January 30, 1972. First-seeded foreign player Ilie Năstase won the singles title and earned $3,000 first-prize money as well as 15 points for the Boise Cascade Classic ranking.

== Finals ==
=== Singles ===
(Romania) Ilie Năstase defeated (Romania) Ion Țiriac 2–6, 6–1, 6–1

- It was Năstase's 2nd singles title of the year and 14th of his career.

=== Doubles ===
(Romania) Ilie Năstase / (Romania) Ion Țiriac defeated (Spain) Andrés Gimeno / (Spain) Manuel Orantes 5–7, 6–4, 7–6
