= 1973 Roanoke International =

- Date: January 15–21
- Edition: 2nd
- Category: USLTA Indoor Circuit
- Draw: 8S / 4D
- Prize money: $7,500
- Surface: Carpet / indoor
- Location: Roanoke, Virginia, U.S.
- Venue: Roanoke Civic Center

Champions

Singles
- (United States) Jimmy Connors

Doubles
- (United States) Jimmy Connors / (Spain) Juan Gisbert Sr.
← 1972 ·	Roanoke International Tennis Tournament	· 1974 →

The 1973 Roanoke International was a men's tennis tournament played on indoor carpet courts at the Roanoke Civic Center in Roanoke, Virginia, in the United States that was part of the 1973 USLTA Indoor Circuit. It was the second edition of the event and was held from January 15 through January 21, 1973. First-seeded Jimmy Connors won his second consecutive singles title at the event and earned $2,500 first-prize money.

== Finals ==
=== Singles ===
(United States) Jimmy Connors defeated (Australia) Ian Fletcher 6–2, 6–3

- It was Connors' 2nd singles title of the year and the 8th of his career.

=== Doubles ===
(United States) Jimmy Connors / (Spain) Juan Gisbert Sr. defeated (Australia) Ian Fletcher / (United States) Butch Seewagen 6–0, 7–6
