= 1974 Roanoke International =

- Date: January 17–21
- Edition: 3rd
- Category: USLTA Indoor Circuit
- Draw: 16S / 8D
- Prize money: $20,000
- Surface: Carpet / indoor
- Location: Roanoke, Virginia, U.S.
- Venue: Roanoke Civic Center

Champions

Singles
- (United States) Jimmy Connors

Doubles
- (United States) Vitas Gerulaitis / (United States) Sandy Mayer
← 1973 ·	Roanoke International Tennis Tournament	· 1975 →

The 1974 Roanoke International, also known as the Roanoke Invitational Tennis Tournament, was a men's tennis tournament played on indoor carpet courts at the Roanoke Civic Center in Roanoke, Virginia, in the United States that was part of the 1974 USLTA Indoor Circuit. It was the third edition of the event and was held from January 17 through January 21, 1974. First-seeded Jimmy Connors won his third consecutive singles title at the event and earned $5,000 first-prize money.

== Finals ==
=== Singles ===
(United States) Jimmy Connors defeated (West Germany) Karl Meiler 6–4, 6–3

- It was Connors' 2nd singles title of the year and the 19th of his career.

=== Doubles ===
(United States) Vitas Gerulaitis / (United States) Sandy Mayer defeated (New Zealand) Ian Crookenden / (New Zealand) Jeff Simpson 7–6, 6–1
