= 1973 U.S. Women's Indoor Championships =

Women's tennis tournament

- Date: March 14–18
- Edition: 65th
- Category: Grand Prix (Group C)
- Draw: 16S / 16D
- Prize money: $20,000
- Surface: Carpet / indoor
- Location: Hingham, MA, United States
- Venue: Old Colony Tennis Club

Champions

Singles
- (Australia) Evonne Goolagong

Doubles
- (Soviet Union) Marina Kroschina / (Soviet Union) Olga Morozova
← 1972 ·	U.S. Women's Indoor Championships	· 1974 →

The 1973 U.S. Women's Indoor Championships, also known as the USLTA National Indoors, was a women's tennis tournament played on indoor carpet courts at the Old Colony Tennis Club in Hingham, Massachusetts in the United States that was part of the Group C tier of the Grand Prix circuit which was incorporated into the 1973 WTA Tour. It was the 65th edition of the tournament and was held from March 14 through March 18, 1973. Second-seeded Evonne Goolagong won the singles title and collected $5,000 first-prize money.

== Finals ==
=== Singles ===
(Australia) Evonne Goolagong defeated (United Kingdom) Virginia Wade 6–0, 6–2

- It was Goolagong's 2nd singles title of the year and the 43rd of her career.

=== Doubles ===
(Soviet Union) Marina Kroschina / (Soviet Union) Olga Morozova defeated (Australia) Evonne Goolagong / (Australia) Janet Young 6–2, 6–4

== See also ==
- 1973 U.S. National Indoor Tennis Championships – men's tournament
