= Khartoum International =

Defunct tennis tournament

The Khartoum International is a defunct tennis tournament that was played on the Grand Prix tennis circuit in 1976. The event was held in Khartoum, Sudan and was played on outdoor hard courts. Mike Estep won the singles title, defeating Thomaz Koch in the final.

== Singles ==
Year	Champion	Runner-up	Score
1976	(United States) Mike Estep	(Brazil) Thomaz Koch	6–4, 6–7, 6–4, 6–3
