= 1971 Midlands International =

- Date: January 25–31
- Edition: 3rd
- Category: USLTA Indoor Circuit
- Draw: 16S / 8D
- Prize money: $15,000
- Surface: Carpet / indoor
- Location: Omaha, Nebraska, U.S.
- Venue: City Auditorium
- Attendance: 10,956

Champions

Singles
- (Romania) Ilie Năstase

Doubles
- (United States) Clark Graebner / (Brazil) Thomaz Koch
← 1970 ·	Omaha Open	· 1972 →

The 1971 Midlands International, also known as the Omaha International, was a men's tennis tournament played on indoor carpet courts at the City Auditorium in Omaha, Nebraska, in the United States that was part of the 1971 USLTA Indoor Circuit. It was the third edition of the event and was held from January 25 through January 31, 1971. The event was sponsored by the Junior League of Omaha. First-seeded Ilie Năstase won the singles title and earned $3,000 first-prize money.

== Finals ==
=== Singles ===
(Romania) Ilie Năstase defeated (United States) Cliff Richey 6–4, 6–3, 6–1

- It was Năstase's 1st singles title of the year and 5th of his career.

=== Doubles ===
(United States) Clark Graebner / (Brazil) Thomaz Koch defeated (United States) Jim McManus / (United States) Jim Osborne 6–4, 4–6, 6–4
