= 1974 Birmingham International =

- Date: February 13–17
- Edition: 2nd
- Category: USLTA Indoor Circuit
- Draw: 17S / 9D
- Prize money: $25,000
- Surface: Carpet / indoor
- Location: Birmingham, Alabama, U.S.
- Venue: Birmingham Municipal Auditorium

Champions

Singles
- (United States) Jimmy Connors

Doubles
- (Australia) Ian Fletcher / (United States) Sandy Mayer
← 1973 ·	ATP Birmingham	· 1975 →

The 1974 Birmingham International was a men's tennis tournament played on indoor carpet courts at the Birmingham Municipal Auditorium in Birmingham, Alabama, in the United States that was part of the 1974 USLTA Indoor Circuit. It was the second edition of the event and was held from February 13 through February 17, 1974. Top-seeded Jimmy Connors won the singles title and earned $5,000 first-prize money after defeating Sandy Mayer in the final.

== Finals ==
=== Singles ===
(United States) Jimmy Connors defeated (United States) Sandy Mayer 7–5, 6–3

- It was Connors' 4th singles title of the year and the 21st of his career.

=== Doubles ===
(Australia) Ian Fletcher / (United States) Sandy Mayer defeated (Greece) Nicholas Kalogeropoulos / (Colombia) Iván Molina 7–5, 6–7, 6–3
