= Salt Lake City Open (tennis) =

Defunct tennis tournament
- Event name: Salt Lake City Open
- Tour: USLTA Indoor Circuit
- Founded: 1973
- Abolished: 1974
- Editions: 2
- Location: Salt Lake City, USA
- Surface: Hard / indoor

The Salt Lake City Open is a defunct men's tennis tournament that was part of the USLTA Indoor Circuit and played in 1973 and 1974. The event was held in Salt Lake City, Utah and was played on indoor hard courts. Jimmy Connors won the singles title at both editions.

== Past finals ==
=== Singles ===
Year	Champions	Runners-up	Score
1973	(United States) Jimmy Connors	(United States) Paul Gerken	6–1, 6–2
1974	(United States) Jimmy Connors	(United States) Vitas Gerulaitis	4–6, 7–6, 6–3

=== Doubles ===
Year	Champions	Runners-up	Score
1973	(United States) Mike Estep (Mexico) Raúl Ramírez	(Czech Republic) Jiří Hřebec (Czech Republic) Jan Kukal	6–4, 7–6
1974	(United States) Jimmy Connors (United States) Vitas Gerulaitis	(Colombia) Iván Molina (Colombia) Jairo Velasco, Sr.	2–6, 7–6, 7–5
