= 1974 Canadian Indoor Championships =

- Date: 12–17 March
- Edition: 2nd
- Category: USLTA Indoor Circuit
- Draw: 32S / 16D
- Prize money: $25,000
- Surface: Hard / indoor
- Location: Calgary, Alberta, Canada
- Venue: Glenmore Racquet Club

Champions

Singles
- (West Germany) Karl Meiler

Doubles
- (West Germany) Jürgen Fassbender / (West Germany) Karl Meiler
- Calgary Indoor

The 1974 Canadian Indoor Championships was a men's tennis tournament played on indoor hard courts that was part of the 1974 USLTA Indoor Circuit and took place at the Glenmore Racquet Club in Calgary, Alberta in Canada. It was the second and last edition of the tournament and was held from 12 March through 17 March 1974. Third-seeded (Note: Meiler was seeded third but became the highest seeded player when the two top-seeded players, Jimmy Connors and Sandy Mayer, withdrew before the tournament started.) Karl Meiler won the singles title which earned him $4,000 first-prize money.

== Finals ==
=== Singles ===
(West Germany) Karl Meiler defeated (South Africa) Byron Bertram 6–4, 3–6, 6–3

- It was Meiler's 2nd and last singles title of the year and the 2nd of his career.

=== Doubles ===
(West Germany) Jürgen Fassbender / (West Germany) Karl Meiler defeated (Colombia) Iván Molina / (Colombia) Jairo Velasco, Sr. 6–4, 6–4
