= 1974 Baltimore International =

- Date: January 29 – February 3
- Edition: 3rd
- Category: USLTA Indoor Circuit
- Draw: 24S / 12D
- Prize money: $20,000
- Surface: Carpet / indoor
- Location: Baltimore, MD, U.S.
- Venue: Towson State College

Champions

Singles
- (United States) Sandy Mayer

Doubles
- (West Germany) Jürgen Fassbender / (West Germany) Karl Meiler
- Baltimore International

The 1974 Baltimore International was a men's tennis tournament played on indoor carpet courts at the Towson State College in Baltimore, Maryland in the United States that was part of the 1974 USLTA Indoor Circuit. It was the third edition of the event and was held from January 29 through February 3, 1974. Sandy Mayer won the singles title.

== Finals ==
=== Singles ===
(United States) Sandy Mayer defeated (United States) Clark Graebner 6–2, 6–1

- It was Mayer' 1st singles title of the year and the 2nd of his career.

=== Doubles ===
(West Germany) Jürgen Fassbender / (West Germany) Karl Meiler defeated (Australia) Owen Davidson / (United States) Clark Graebner 7–6, 7–5
