= Jean-Baptiste Chanfreau =

French tennis player

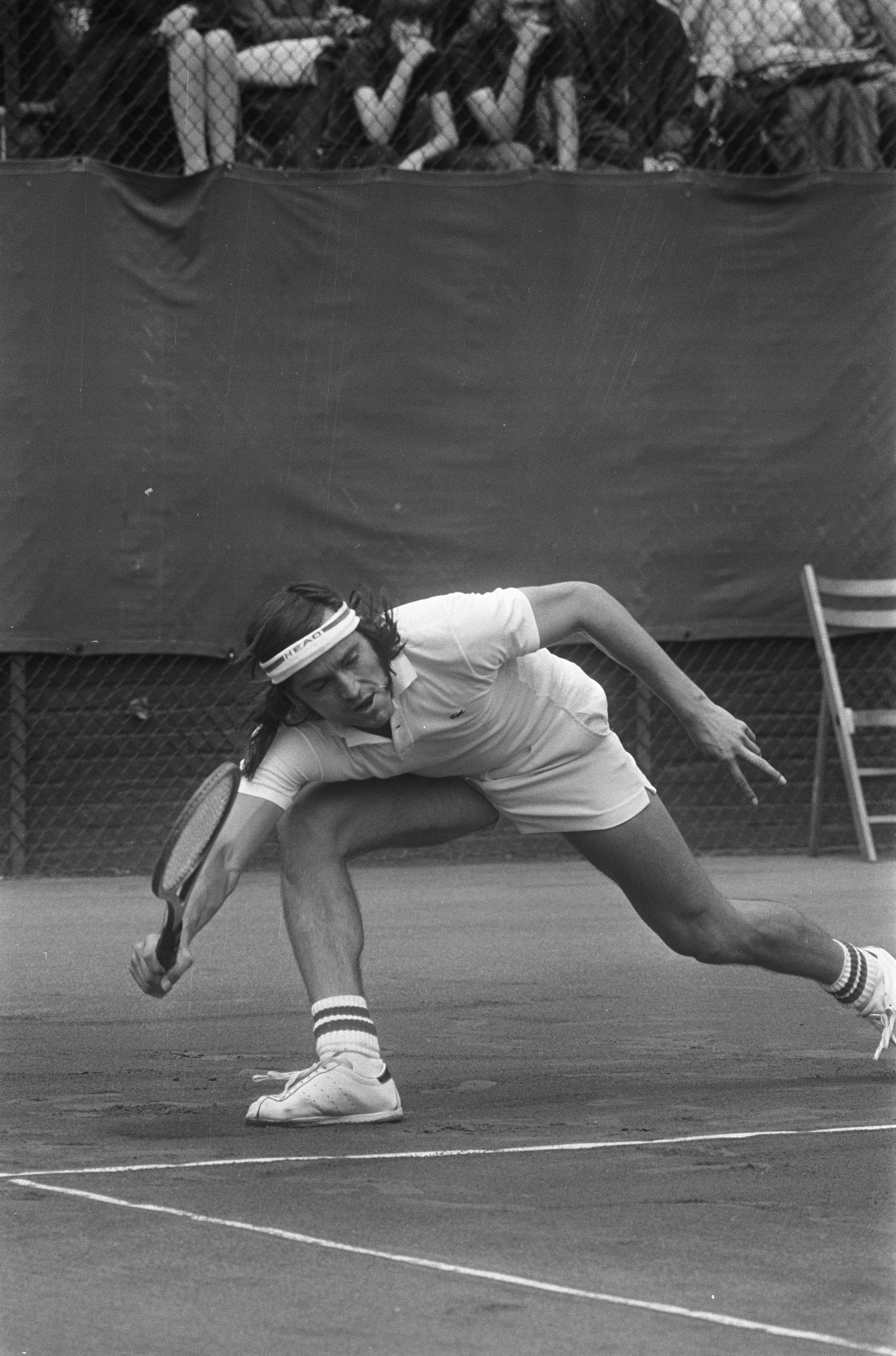
- Country (sports): France
- Born: 17 January 1947 Chanzy, France
- Died: 9 May 2021 (aged 74) Marseille, France
- Height: 1.86 m (6 ft 1 in)
- Plays: Right-handed

Singles
- Career record: 47–110 (15 Oct 1973)
- Career titles: 0
- Highest ranking: No. 83

Grand Slam singles results
- French Open: 3R (1971)
- Wimbledon: 3R (1974)
- US Open: 2R (1973)

Other tournaments

Doubles
- Career record: 45–83
- Career titles: 0

Grand Slam mixed doubles results
- French Open: SF (1971)

Jean-Baptiste Chanfreau (17 January 1947 – 9 May 2021) was a French international tennis player. He competed in the Australian Open in 1969 and in the Davis Cup a number of times, from 1970 to 1973.

== Career finals ==
=== Doubles (2 runner-ups) ===
| Result | W/L | Date | Tournament | Surface | Partner | Opponents | Score |
|---|---|---|---|---|---|---|---|
| Loss | 0–1 | Sep 1972 | Seattle, U.S. | Hard | (France) Wanaro N'Godrella | (Australia) Ross Case (Australia) Geoff Masters | 6–4, 6–7, 4–6 |
| Loss | 0–2 | Jan 1974 | Philadelphia WCT, U.S. | Carpet (i) | (France) Georges Goven | (South Africa) Pat Cramer (United States) Mike Estep | 1–6, 1–6 |
