= Des Moines Open =

Tennis tournament in Iowa, U.S.

Defunct tennis tournament
- Event name: Des Moines Open
- Tour: USLTA Indoor Circuit
- Founded: 1971
- Abolished: 1973
- Editions: 3
- Location: Des Moines, Iowa, US
- Venue: Veterans Memorial Auditorium
- Surface: Carpet

The Des Moines Open also known as the Des Moines International Indoors is a defunct USLTA Indoor Circuit affiliated men's tennis tournament played from 1971 to 1973. It was held at the Veterans Memorial Auditorium in Des Moines, Iowa, in the United States and played on indoor carpet courts in February.

== Past finals ==
=== Singles ===
Year	Champions	Runners-up	Score
1971	(United States) Cliff Richey	(Czechoslovakia) Vladimír Zedník	6–1, 6–3
1972	(United States) Pancho Gonzales	(France) Georges Goven	3–6, 4–6, 6–3, 6–4, 6–2
1973	(United States) Clark Graebner	(Greece) Nicholas Kalogeropoulos	7–5, 4–6, 6–4

=== Doubles ===
Year	Champions	Runners-up	Score
1971	(Czechoslovakia) Milan Holeček (Czechoslovakia) Vladimír Zedník	(United States) Tom Edlefsen (United States) Frank Froehling	6–3, 7–5
1972	(United States) Jim Osborne (United States) Jim McManus	(France) Georges Goven (Brazil) Thomaz Koch	6–2, 6–3
1973	(Czechoslovakia) Jiří Hřebec (Czechoslovakia) Jan Kukal	(Spain) Juan Gisbert Sr. (Romania) Ion Țiriac	4–6, 7–6, 6–1
