= Tennis South Invitational =

Defunct tennis tournament
- Event name: Mississippi Indoors (1973–74); Tennis South Invitational (1975–77)
- Tour: USLTA Indoor Circuit (1973–75); WCT (1976); Independent (1977)
- Founded: 1973
- Abolished: 1977
- Editions: 5
- Location: Jackson, Mississippi, U.S.
- Venue: Mississippi Coliseum
- Surface: Carpet / indoor

The Tennis South Invitational, was a men's tennis tournament founded in 1973 as the Mississippi International Indoor Tennis Championships. It was played at the Mississippi Coliseum in Jackson, Mississippi in the United States until 1977. The event was played as part of the USLTA Indoor Circuit from 1973 through 1975 and became a World Championship Tennis event in 1976. In its final year, 1977, it was an independent event, i.e. not part of a tennis tour or circuit. The tournament was played on indoor carpet courts. Ken Rosewall was the only multiple singles champion, winning the title in 1975 and 1976.

== Finals ==
=== Singles ===
| Year | Champions | Runners-up | Score |
|---|---|---|---|
| 1973 | (United States) Eddie Dibbs | (South Africa) Frew McMillan | 5–7, 6–1, 7–5 |
| 1974 | (United States) Sandy Mayer | (West Germany) Karl Meiler | 7–6^{(5–2)}, 7–5 |
| 1975 | (Australia) Ken Rosewall | (United States) Butch Buchholz | 7–5, 4–6, 7–6^{(7–3)} |
| 1976 | (Australia) Ken Rosewall | (Mexico) Raúl Ramírez | 6–3, 6–3 |
| 1977 | (United States) Brian Teacher | (United States) Bill Scanlon | 6–3, 6–3 |

=== Doubles ===
| Year | Champions | Runners-up | Score |
|---|---|---|---|
| 1973 | (United States) Zan Guerry (South Africa) Frew McMillan | (Chile) Jaime Pinto-Bravo (Argentina) Tito Vázquez | 6–2, 6–4 |
| 1974 | (United States) Fred McNair (United States) Grover Raz Reid | (South Africa) Byron Bertram (United Kingdom) John Feaver | 3–6, 6–3, 6–3 |
| 1975 | (Australia) Ken Rosewall (Australia) Fred Stolle | (United States) Billy Martin (Australia) John Newcombe | 6–4, 2–6, 6–1 |
| 1976 | (United States) Brian Gottfried (Mexico) Raúl Ramírez | (Australia) Ross Case (Australia) Geoff Masters | 7–5, 4–6, 6–0 |
| 1977 | (South Africa) Bob Hewitt (South Africa) Frew McMillan | (Australia) Phil Dent (Australia) Ken Rosewall | 6–2, 7–6 |
