= Jan Kukal =

Czech tennis player (born 1942)

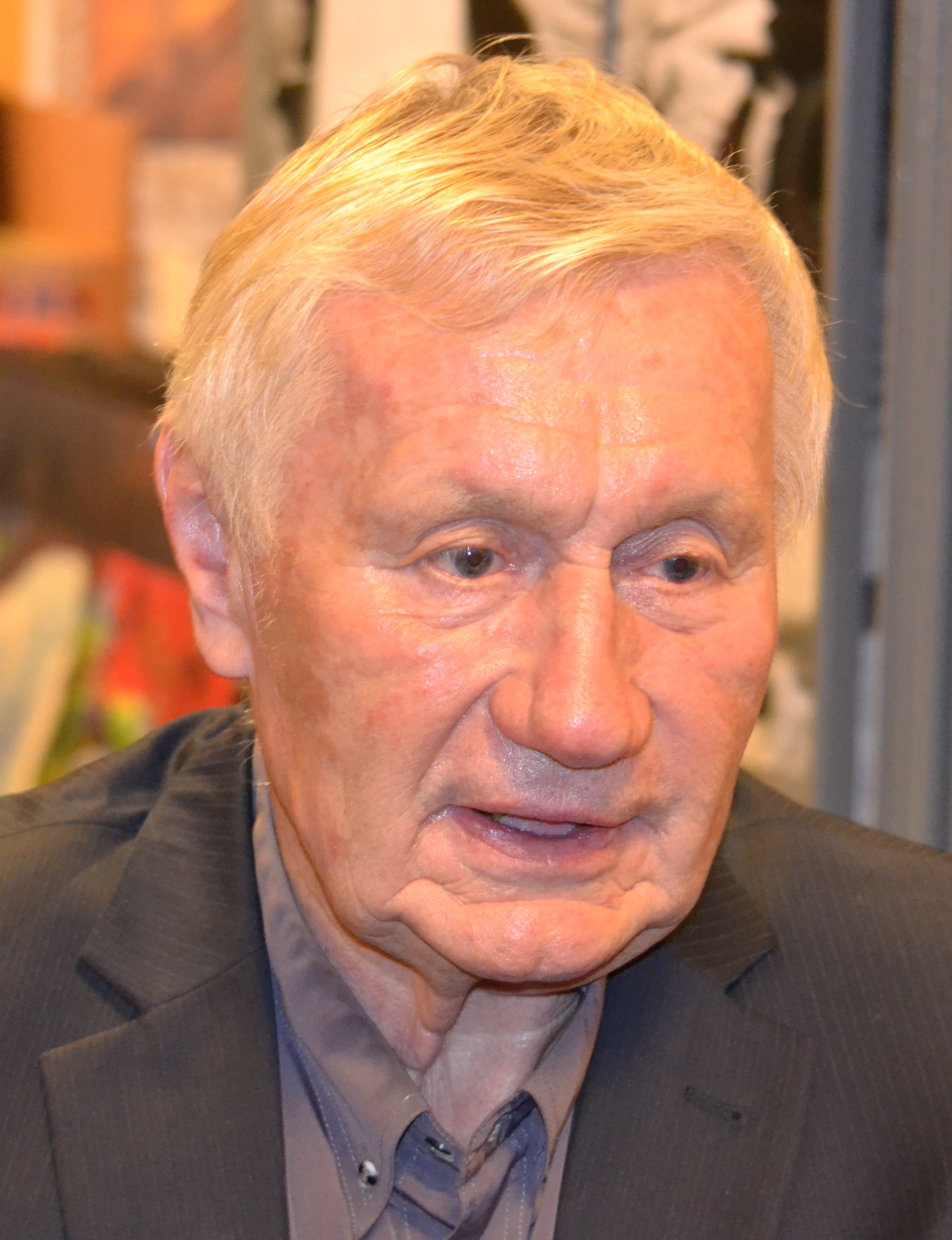
- Jan Kukal in 2013
- Country (sports): Czechoslovakia
- Residence: Ostrava
- Born: 13 September 1942 (age 83) Prague, Czechoslovakia
- Plays: Right-handed

Singles
- Career record: 32–54
- Career titles: 0
- Highest ranking: No. 115 (23 Aug 1973)

Grand Slam singles results
- Australian Open: 2R (1970, 1976)
- French Open: 3R (1969)
- Wimbledon: 2R (1969, 1970, 1972)
- US Open: 2R (1972)

Doubles
- Career record: 46–46
- Career titles: 1

Grand Slam doubles results
- Australian Open: 2R (1970)
- French Open: SF (1972)
- Wimbledon: QF (1973)
- US Open: 3R (1969)

Jan Kukal (born 13 September 1942) is a Czech former professional tennis player who competed for Czechoslovakia.

== Career ==
Kukal won the Czechoslovak National Championships in 1968, the same year that he played his first Davis Cup tie for his country. He went on to appear in a total of 16 Davis Cup ties and finished with a 13-11 career record, which included five singles wins. In 1969 he was a member of the Czechoslovak team that won Europe's King's Cup.

He reached four Grand Prix/WCT doubles finals during his career, for one win, at Des Moines in 1973.

At Grand Slam level his best performance was a semi-final appearance in the doubles event at the 1972 French Open, with Jan Kodeš.

== Coaching ==
Kukal began his coaching career while he was still playing. In 1972 he was coach of the Romania Davis Cup team and he coached the Dutch team the following year. From 1981 to 1983, he coached Czechoslovakia in the Davis Cup. During that time he was also Czechoslovak Fed Cup captain and led them to the 1983 Federation Cup title. He then coached the Austria Davis Cup team, from 1984 to 1990, and captained the Czech Republic Davis Cup team from 1999 until 2003.

== Grand Prix/WCT career finals ==
=== Doubles: 4 (1–3) ===
Result	W–L	Date	Tournament	Surface	Partner	Opponents	Score
Loss	0–1	Aug 1972	Montreal, Canada	Clay	(Czechoslovakia) Jan Kodeš	(Romania) Ilie Năstase (Romania) Ion Țiriac	6–7, 3–6
Loss	0–2	Apr 1971	Catania, Italy	Clay	(Czechoslovakia) Jan Kodeš	(France) Pierre Barthès (France) François Jauffret	4–6, 6–3, 3–6
Win	1–2	Feb 1973	Des Moines, United States	Hard	(Czechoslovakia) Jiří Hřebec	(Spain) Juan Gisbert (Romania) Ion Țiriac	4–6, 7–6, 6–1
Loss	1–3	Feb 1973	Salt Lake City, United States	Hard	(Czechoslovakia) Jiří Hřebec	(United States) Mike Estep (Mexico) Raúl Ramírez	4–6, 6–7
