= Jiří Hřebec =

Czech tennis player (born 1950)

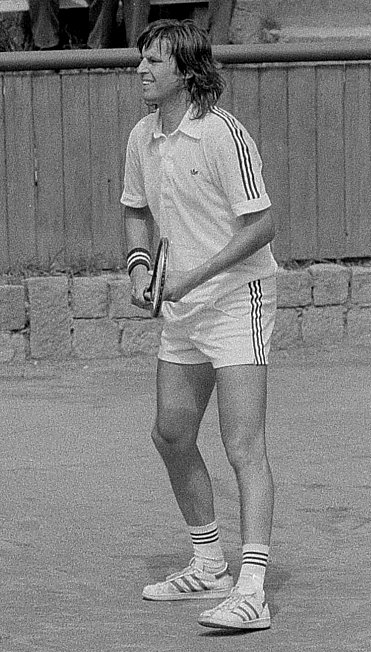
- Jiří Hřebec at the final 1981 Czech Tennis Championships in Plzeň
- Country (sports): Czechoslovakia
- Born: September 19, 1950 (age 74); Teplice, Czechoslovakia
- Height: 1.83 m (6 ft 0 in)
- Plays: Right-handed (one-handed backhand)

Singles
- Career record: 165–167
- Career titles: 3
- Highest ranking: No. 25 (19 April 1974)

Grand Slam singles results
- French Open: 3R (1975, 1977)
- Wimbledon: 4R (1972)
- US Open: 2R (1973, 1974, 1979)

Doubles
- Career record: 121–123
- Career titles: 4

Team competitions
- Davis Cup: F (1975)

Jiří Hřebec (born 19 September 1950) is a retired Czech professional tennis player. He won three singles and four doubles titles on the ATP Tour during his career. Hřebec achieved his highest singles ranking of world No. 25 in April 1974.

Currently, he acts as one of the two trainers of the Czech tennis player Markéta Vondroušová, together with Jan Hernych.

== ATP Tour finals ==
=== Singles (3–5) ===
| Result | W/L | Date | Tournament | Surface | Opponent | Score |
|---|---|---|---|---|---|---|
| Win | 1–0 | Oct 1973 | Prague, Czechoslovakia | Clay | (Czechoslovakia) Jan Kodeš | 4–6, 6–1, 3–6, 6–0, 7–5 |
| Loss | 1–1 | Mar 1974 | Atlanta WCT, U.S. | Carpet (i) | (United States) Dick Stockton | 2–6, 1–6 |
| Loss | 1–2 | Jul 1974 | Düsseldorf, West Germany | Clay | (Belgium) Bernard Mignot | 1–6, 0–6, 6–0, 4–6 |
| Win | 2–2 | Feb 1975 | Basel, Switzerland | Carpet (i) | (Romania) Ilie Năstase | 6–1, 7–6, 2–6, 6–3 |
| Loss | 2–3 | Mar 1975 | Memphis, U.S. | Hard (i) | (United States) Harold Solomon | 6–2, 1–6, 4–6 |
| Loss | 2–4 | Mar 1976 | Basel, Switzerland | Carpet (i) | (Czechoslovakia) Jan Kodeš | 4–6, 2–6, 3–6 |
| Win | 3–4 | Feb 1977 | San Jose, United States | Hard | (United States) Sandy Mayer | 3–6, 6–4, 7–5 |
| Loss | 3–5 | Jun 1977 | Berlin, West Germany | Clay | (Italy) Paolo Bertolucci | 4–6, 7–5, 6–4, 2–6, 4–6 |

=== Doubles titles (4–5) ===
| Result | W/L | Date | Tournament | Surface | Partner | Opponents | Score |
|---|---|---|---|---|---|---|---|
| Loss | 0–1 | Apr 1972 | Monte Carlo, Monaco | Clay | (Czechoslovakia) František Pála | (France) Patrice Beust (France) Daniel Contet | 6–3, 1–6, 10–12, 2–6 |
| Win | 1–1 | Feb 1973 | Des Moines, United States | Hard (i) | (Czechoslovakia) Jan Kukal | (Spain) Juan Gisbert (Romania) Ion Țiriac | 4–6, 7–6, 6–1 |
| Loss | 1–2 | Feb 1973 | Salt Lake City, United States | Hard | (Czechoslovakia) Jan Kukal | (United States) Mike Estep (Mexico) Raúl Ramírez | 4–6, 6–7 |
| Win | 2–2 | Jul 1974 | Düsseldorf, West Germany | Clay | (Czechoslovakia) Jan Kodeš | (Japan) Kenichi Hirai (Japan) Toshiro Sakai | 6–1, 6–4 |
| Loss | 2–3 | Mar 1976 | Basel, Switzerland | Carpet (i) | (Czechoslovakia) Jan Kodeš | (South Africa) Frew McMillan (Netherlands) Tom Okker | 4–6, 6–7, 4–6 |
| Win | 3–3 | Jul 1976 | Kitzbühel, Austria | Clay | (Czechoslovakia) Jan Kodeš | (West Germany) Jürgen Fassbender (West Germany) Hans-Jürgen Pohmann | 6–7, 6–2, 6–4 |
| Win | 4–3 | Mar 1977 | Helsinki, Finland | Carpet (i) | (Austria) Hans Kary | (United Kingdom) David Lloyd (United Kingdom) John Lloyd | 5–7, 7–6, 6–4 |
| Loss | 4–4 | Mar 1980 | Nice, France | Clay | (Czechoslovakia) Stanislav Birner | (United States) Chris Delaney (Australia) Kim Warwick | 4–6, 0–6 |
| Loss | 4–5 | Mar 1981 | Nancy, France | Hard (i) | (United Kingdom) John Feaver | (Romania) Ilie Năstase (Italy) Adriano Panatta | 4–6, 6–2, 4–6 |
