= Mississippi Coliseum =

Multipurpose arena in Jackson, Mississippi

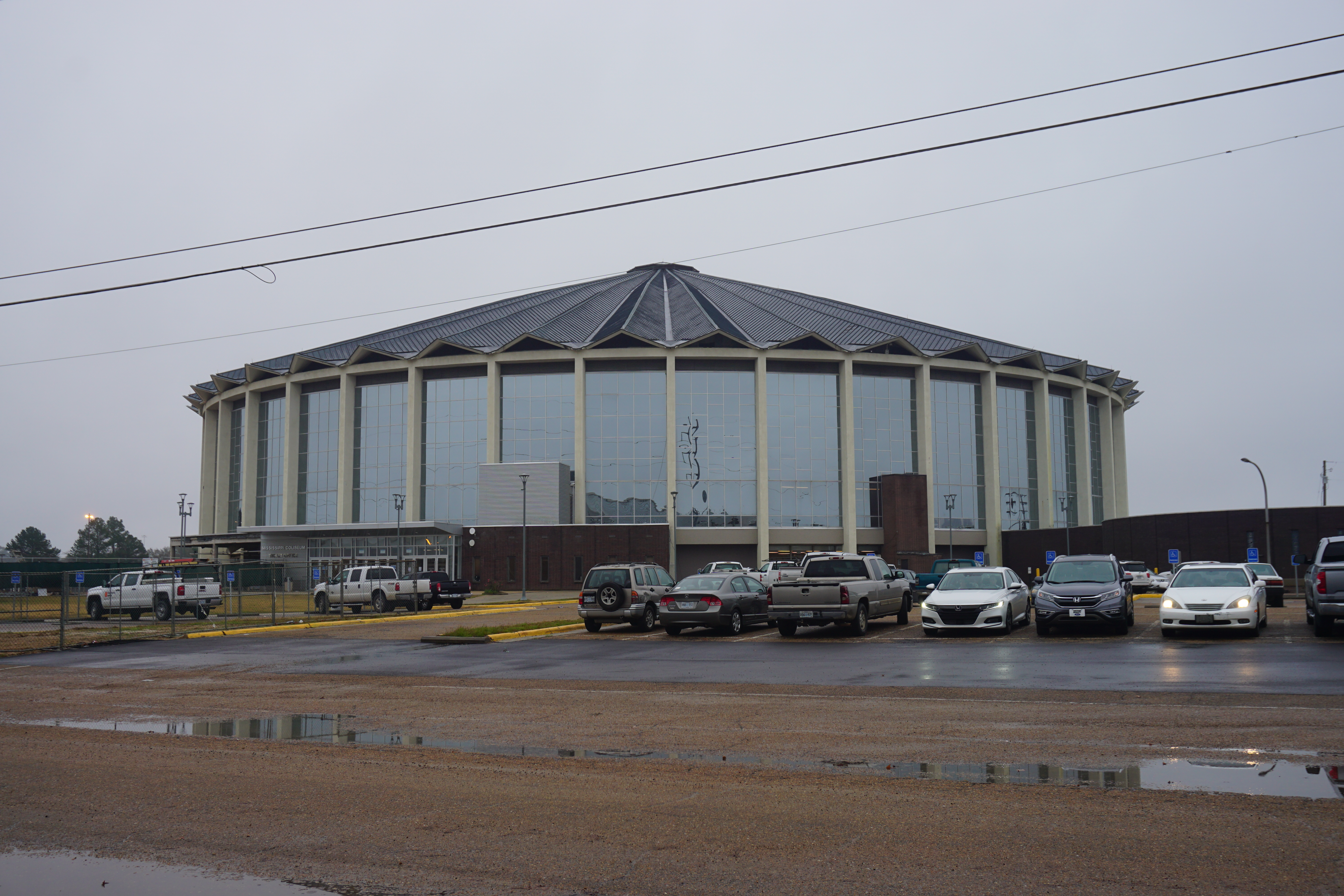
- The Mississippi Coliseum in 2018
- Interactive map of Mississippi Coliseum
- Address: 1207 Mississippi St.
- Location: Jackson, Mississippi
- Coordinates: 32.300126°N 90.172121°W
- Owner: Mississippi Department of Agriculture and Commerce
- Operator: Mississippi Department of Agriculture and Commerce
- Capacity: 6,500 (basketball); 10,000 (concerts)

Construction
- Opened: 1962

Tenants
- Jackson Bandits (ECHL) (1999–2003); Mississippi Raiders (AIF) (2024)

Website
- www.mdac.ms.gov/bureaus-departments/state-fair-commission/mississippi-coliseum/

The Mississippi Coliseum is a 6,500-seat multi-purpose arena in Jackson, Mississippi, built in 1962 and located on the Mississippi State Fairgrounds complex. The arena has 6,812 seats available for basketball, and can be expanded to 10,000 for concerts. It sits 2900 feet (884 meters) atop the extinct Jackson Volcano.

In addition to the Coliseum, the Mississippi State Fairgrounds includes: The Mississippi Trade Mart, the A & I agricultural complex and the Kirk Fordice Equine Center.

It was home to the Jackson Bandits minor league ice hockey team from 1999 to 2003.

The Fairgrounds hosts the Mississippi State Fair each October. Each February, the Mississippi Coliseum and surrounding complex host The Dixie National Rodeo, which is the largest rodeo east of the Mississippi River

Starting in the 2018–19 basketball season, Mississippi State Bulldogs men's basketball and Ole Miss Rebels men's basketball have played one game at the arena each season.
