= Frew McMillan =

South African tennis player

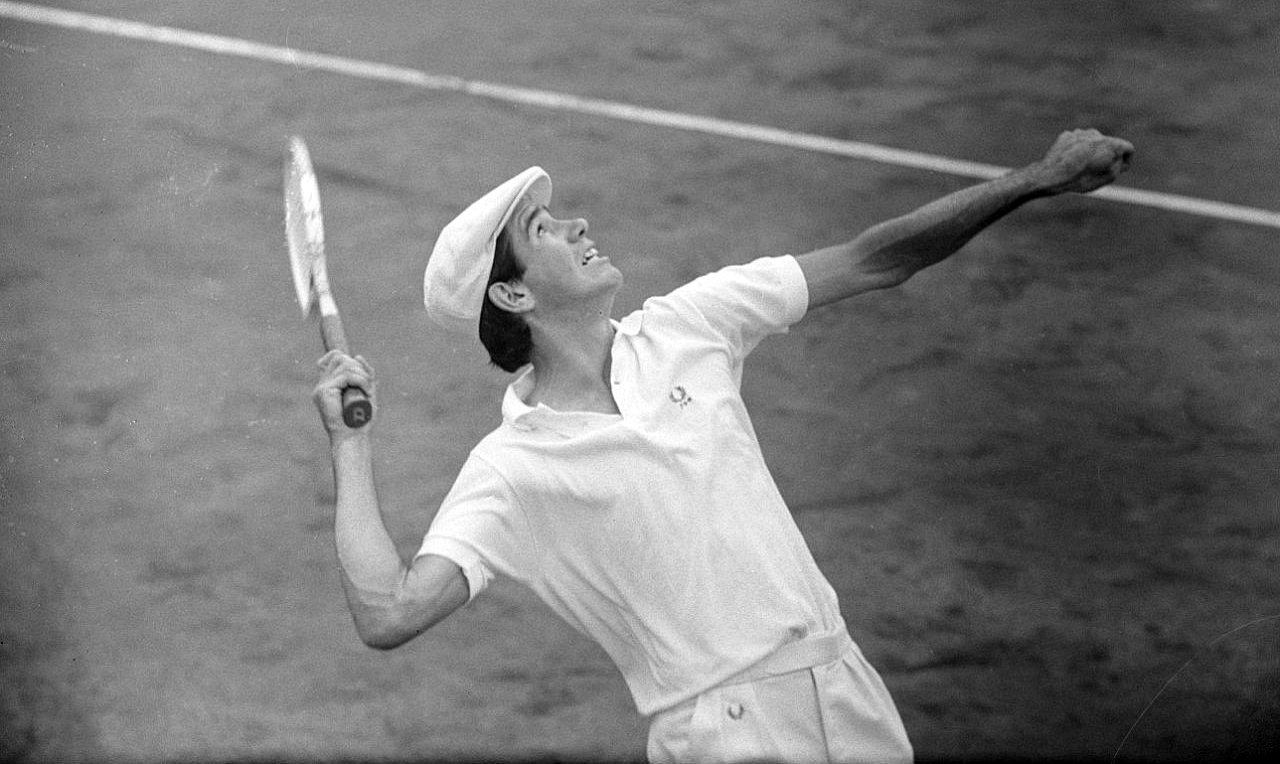
- Full name: Frew Donald McMillan
- Country (sports): South Africa
- Residence: Bristol, England
- Born: 20 May 1942 (age 84) Springs, South Africa
- Height: 1.83 m (6 ft 0 in)
- Turned pro: 1969 (amateur tour from 1961)
- Retired: 1983
- Plays: Right-handed (two-handed both sides)
- Prize money: $609,072
- Int. Tennis HoF: 1992 (member page)

Singles
- Career record: 142–213 (Open Era)
- Career titles: 2
- Highest ranking: No. 39 (6 March 1974)

Grand Slam singles results
- Australian Open: 1R (1971)
- French Open: 3R (1967, 1971)
- Wimbledon: 3R (1970, 1978)
- US Open: QF (1972)

Doubles
- Career record: 552–207
- Career titles: 64
- Highest ranking: No. 1 (23 August 1977)

Grand Slam doubles results
- Australian Open: 1R (1971)
- French Open: W (1972)
- Wimbledon: W (1967, 1972, 1978)
- US Open: W (1977)

Other doubles tournaments
- Tour Finals: W (1977)

Mixed doubles
- Career titles: 5

Grand Slam mixed doubles results
- French Open: W (1966)
- Wimbledon: W (1978, 1981)
- US Open: W (1977, 1978)

Team competitions
- Davis Cup: W (1974)

Frew Donald McMillan (born 20 May 1942) is a former professional tennis player from South Africa who won five grand slam doubles titles including three Wimbledons with Bob Hewitt. All together, he won 63 doubles titles, surpassed only by the Bryan brothers, Daniel Nestor, Mark Woodforde, Todd Woodbridge, John McEnroe and Tom Okker. He was also ranked No.1 in Doubles on the ATP Computer for a significant period from 1977 to 1979 when he was aged 37.

== Early life ==
McMillan was born in Springs, South Africa.

== Tennis career ==
Aside from McMillan's considerable success as a doubles player, he had a singles career with good results mostly in South Africa.

McMillan played in 38 Grand Slam singles events with a 28 to 38 win–loss record, first playing in 1961 at Wimbledon and last at the first US Open at Flushing Meadows in 1978. His best results in both came at the US Open reaching the quarter finals in 1972 and the last 16 in 1976. Arguably his greatest result was reaching the final of the 1970 South African Open held at Ellis Park. He beat a raging Pancho Gonzales in the semi-final before losing to world number 1 Rod Laver in four sets in the final. At the time, the South African, Italian and German Opens were rated the top three tournaments beneath the Grand Slams. As late as 1979 McMillan reached the quarter-finals of the Fischer Open in Vienna.

McMillan continued to play the tour for many years. In doubles, he played his last Wimbledon with Bob Hewitt in 1979 reaching the semi-finals. They made a last appearance together in the main draw at Flushing Meadows in 1980 reaching the quarter-finals with a nostalgic victory over fellow veteran Americans Clark Graebner and Charlie Pasarell. McMillan won his last tour title at the 1982 South African Open with Brian Gottfried.

McMillan played for many years on the seniors tours and was runner-up at the inaugural "Wimbledon over 35's" to John Newcombe in 1982 after good wins against Tony Roche, Mark Cox and Ismail El Shafei. In 1988 he and Hewitt, older by 20 years between them, beat the Gullikson twins Tim and Tom in the Over 35's doubles final at Wimbledon.

== Style of play ==
The most notable aspect of McMillan's game was that he had both a two-handed backhand and forehand, which increased his power while restricting his mobility. In the 1967 Wimbledon, he and Hewitt did not lose a set, and McMillan did not once lose a service game.

== Post-retirement ==
McMillan was inducted into the International Tennis Hall of Fame in Newport, Rhode Island, in 1992. He now works as a tennis commentator for Eurosport and on BBC Radio 5.

== Grand Slam finals ==
=== Doubles (5 wins) ===
Result	Year	Championship	Surface	Partner	Opponents	Score
Win	1967	Wimbledon	Grass	(South Africa) Bob Hewitt	(Australia) Roy Emerson (Australia) Ken Fletcher	6–2, 6–3, 6–4
Win	1972	French Open	Clay	(South Africa) Bob Hewitt	(Chile) Patricio Cornejo (Chile) Jaime Fillol	6–3, 8–6, 3–6, 6–1
Win	1972	Wimbledon (2)	Grass	(South Africa) Bob Hewitt	(United States) Stan Smith (United States) Erik van Dillen	6–2, 6–2, 9–7
Win	1977	US Open	Clay	(South Africa) Bob Hewitt	(United States) Brian Gottfried (Mexico) Raúl Ramírez	6–4, 6–0
Win	1978	Wimbledon (3)	Grass	(South Africa) Bob Hewitt	(United States) Peter Fleming (United States) John McEnroe	6–1, 6–4, 6–2

=== Mixed doubles (5 wins, 6 losses) ===
Result	Year	Championship	Surface	Partner	Opponents	Score
Win	1966	French Championships	Clay	(South Africa) Annette Van Zyl	(United Kingdom) Ann Haydon-Jones (United States) Clark Graebner	1–6, 6–3, 6–2
Loss	1970	US Open	Grass	(Australia) Judy Tegart-Dalton	(Australia) Margaret Court (United States) Marty Riessen	4–6, 4–6
Loss	1976	US Open (2)	Clay	(Netherlands) Betty Stöve	(United States) Billie Jean King (Australia) Phil Dent	6–3, 2–6, 5–7
Loss	1977	Wimbledon	Grass	(Netherlands) Betty Stöve	(South Africa) Greer Stevens (South Africa) Bob Hewitt	6–3, 5–7, 4–6
Win	1977	US Open	Clay	(Netherlands) Betty Stöve	(United States) Billie Jean King (United States) Vitas Gerulaitis	6–2, 3–6, 6–3
Win	1978	Wimbledon	Grass	(Netherlands) Betty Stöve	(United States) Billie Jean King (Australia) Ray Ruffels	6–2, 6–2
Win	1978	US Open (2)	Hard	(Netherlands) Betty Stöve	(United States) Billie Jean King (Australia) Ray Ruffels	6–3, 7–6
Loss	1979	Wimbledon (2)	Grass	(Netherlands) Betty Stöve	(South Africa) Greer Stevens (South Africa) Bob Hewitt	5–7, 6–7^{(7–9)}
Loss	1979	US Open (3)	Hard	(Netherlands) Betty Stöve	(South Africa) Greer Stevens (South Africa) Bob Hewitt	3–6, 5–7
Loss	1980	US Open (4)	Hard	(Netherlands) Betty Stöve	(Australia) Wendy Turnbull (United States) Marty Riessen	5–7, 2–6
Win	1981	Wimbledon (2)	Grass	(Netherlands) Betty Stöve	(United States) Tracy Austin (United States) John Austin	4–6, 7–6^{(7–2)}, 6–3

== Grand Prix Championship Series singles finals ==
=== Runner-up (1) ===
Result	Year	Tournament	Opponent	Score
Loss	1970	Johannesburg	(Australia) Rod Laver	6–4, 2–6, 1–6, 2–6

== Open Era career finals ==
=== Singles: 8 (2 titles / 6 runner-ups) ===
Result	W/L	Date	Tournament	Surface	Opponent	Score
Loss	0–1	Apr 1970	Johannesburg, South Africa	Hard	(Australia) Rod Laver	6–4, 2–6, 1–6, 2–6
Loss	0–2	Jun 1972	Dublin, Ireland	Grass	(South Africa) Bob Hewitt	1–6, 2–6
Loss	0–3	Mar 1973	Jackson, US	Hard (i)	(United States) Eddie Dibbs	7–5, 1–6, 5–7
Loss	0–4	Jun 1973	Nottingham, UK	Grass	(United States) Erik van Dillen	6–3, 1–6, 1–6
Loss	0–5	Feb 1974	Salisbury, US	Carpet	(United States) Jimmy Connors	4–6, 5–7, 3–6
Win	1–5	Apr 1974	Munich WCT, Germany	Carpet	(Socialist Federal Republic of Yugoslavia) Nikola Pilić	5–7, 7–6^{(7–4)}, 7–6^{(7–4)}
Win	2–5	Mar 1976	Nuremberg, Germany	Carpet	(Brazil) Thomaz Koch	2–6, 6–3, 6–4
Loss	2–6	Nov 1976	Cologne, Germany	Carpet	(United States) Jimmy Connors	2–6, 3–6

Source: ATP

=== Doubles (64 titles) ===
No.	Date	Tournament	Surface	Partner	Opponents	Score
1.	1970	Washington, D.C., US	Hard	(South Africa) Bob Hewitt	(Romania) Ilie Năstase (Romania) Ion Țiriac	7–5, 6–0
2.	1970	Hamburg, Germany	Clay	(South Africa) Bob Hewitt	(Netherlands) Tom Okker (Socialist Federal Republic of Yugoslavia) Nikola Pilić	6–3, 7–5, 6–2
3.	1972	Bournemouth, United Kingdom	Clay	(South Africa) Bob Hewitt	(Romania) Ilie Năstase (Romania) Ion Țiriac	7–5, 6–2
4.	1972	French Open, Paris	Clay	(South Africa) Bob Hewitt	(Chile) Patricio Cornejo (Chile) Jaime Fillol	6–3, 8–6, 3–6, 6–1
5.	1972	Bristol, United Kingdom	Grass	(South Africa) Bob Hewitt	(United States) Clark Graebner (Australia) Lew Hoad	6–3, 6–2
6.	1972	Wimbledon, London	Grass	(South Africa) Bob Hewitt	(United States) Stan Smith (United States) Erik van Dillen	6–2, 6–2, 9–7
7.	1972	Cincinnati, US	Clay	(South Africa) Bob Hewitt	(United States) Paul Gerken (Venezuela) Humphrey Hose	7–6, 6–4
8.	1972	Indianapolis, US	Clay	(South Africa) Bob Hewitt	(Chile) Patricio Cornejo (Chile) Jaime Fillol	6–2, 6–3
9.	1972	Albany, US	Carpet	(South Africa) Bob Hewitt	(Sweden) Ove Nils Bengtson (Sweden) Björn Borg	6–4, 6–2
10.	1973	Jackson, US	Hard (i)	(United States) Zan Guerry	(Chile) Jaime Pinto-Bravo (Argentina) Tito Vázquez	6–2, 6–4
11.	1973	Tanglewood, US	Other	(Australia) Bob Carmichael	(Egypt) Ismail El Shafei (New Zealand) Brian Fairlie	6–3, 6–4
12.	1973	Indianapolis, US	Clay	(Australia) Bob Carmichael	(Spain) Manuel Orantes (Romania) Ion Țiriac	6–3, 6–4
13.	1973	Quebec City, Canada	Other	(Australia) Bob Carmichael	(United States) Jimmy Connors (United States) Marty Riessen	6–2, 7–6
14.	1974	Salisbury, US	Carpet	(United States) Jimmy Connors	(South Africa) Byron Bertram (Rhodesia) Andrew Pattison	3–6, 6–2, 6–1
15.	1974	Washington WCT, US	Carpet	(South Africa) Bob Hewitt	(Netherlands) Tom Okker (United States) Marty Riessen	7–6, 6–3
16.	1974	Rotterdam, Netherlands	Carpet	(South Africa) Bob Hewitt	(France) Pierre Barthès (Romania) Ilie Năstase	3–6, 6–4, 6–3
17.	1974	Munich WCT, Germany	Carpet	(South Africa) Bob Hewitt	(France) Pierre Barthès (Romania) Ilie Năstase	6–2, 7–6
18.	1974	Johannesburg WCT, South Africa	Hard	(South Africa) Bob Hewitt	(United States) Jim McManus (Rhodesia) Andrew Pattison	6–2, 6–4, 7–6
19.	1974	World Doubles WCT, Montreal	Carpet	(South Africa) Bob Hewitt	(Australia) Owen Davidson (Australia) John Newcombe	6–2, 6–7, 6–1, 6–2
20.	1974	Johannesburg, South Africa	Hard	(South Africa) Bob Hewitt	(Netherlands) Tom Okker (United States) Marty Riessen	7–6, 6–4, 6–3
21.	1975	Rotterdam WCT, Netherlands	Carpet	(South Africa) Bob Hewitt	(Spain) José Higueras (Hungary) Balázs Taróczy	6–2, 6–2
22.	1975	Munich, Germany	Carpet	(South Africa) Bob Hewitt	(Italy) Corrado Barazzutti (Italy) Antonio Zugarelli	6–3, 6–4
23.	1975	Monte Carlo WCT, Monaco	Clay	(South Africa) Bob Hewitt	(United States) Arthur Ashe (Netherlands) Tom Okker	6–3, 6–2
24.	1975	Stockholm, Sweden	Hard (i)	(South Africa) Bob Hewitt	(United States) Charlie Pasarell (United States) Roscoe Tanner	3–6, 6–3, 6–4
25.	1976	Columbus WCT, US	Carpet	(South Africa) Bob Hewitt	(United States) Arthur Ashe (Netherlands) Tom Okker	7–6, 6–4
26.	1976	Baltimore WCT, US	Carpet	(South Africa) Bob Hewitt	(Romania) Ilie Năstase (United States) Cliff Richey	3–6, 7–6, 6–4
27.	1976	Toronto Indoor WCT, Canada	Carpet	(Chile) Jaime Fillol	(Soviet Union) Alex Metreveli (Romania) Ilie Năstase	6–7, 6–2, 6–3
28.	1976	Rotterdam WCT, Netherlands	Carpet	(Australia) Rod Laver	(United States) Arthur Ashe (Netherlands) Tom Okker	6–1, 6–7, 7–6
29.	1976	Basel, Switzerland	Carpet	(Netherlands) Tom Okker	(Czechoslovakia) Jiří Hřebec (Czechoslovakia) Jan Kodeš	6–4, 7–6, 6–4
30.	1976	Nuremberg, Germany	Carpet	(West Germany) Karl Meiler	(Rhodesia) Colin Dowdeswell (Australia) Paul Kronk	7–6, 6–4
31.	1976	Vienna, Austria	Hard (i)	(South Africa) Bob Hewitt	(United States) Brian Gottfried (Mexico) Raúl Ramírez	6–4, 4–0 retired
32.	1976	Cologne, Germany	Carpet	(South Africa) Bob Hewitt	(Rhodesia) Colin Dowdeswell (United States) Mike Estep	6–1, 3–6, 7–6
33.	1976	Stockholm, Sweden	Hard (i)	(South Africa) Bob Hewitt	(Netherlands) Tom Okker (United States) Marty Riessen	6–4, 4–6, 6–4
34.	1977	Philadelphia WCT, US	Carpet	(South Africa) Bob Hewitt	(Poland) Wojtek Fibak (Netherlands) Tom Okker	6–1, 1–6, 6–3
35.	1977	Springfield, Massachusetts, US	Carpet	(South Africa) Bob Hewitt	(Romania) Ion Țiriac (Argentina) Guillermo Vilas	7–6, 6–2
36.	1977	San Jose, California, US	Hard	(South Africa) Bob Hewitt	(United States) Tom Gorman (Australia) Geoff Masters	6–2, 6–3
37.	1977	Palm Springs, California, US	Hard	(South Africa) Bob Hewitt	(United States) Marty Riessen (United States) Roscoe Tanner	7–6, 7–6
38.	1977	Johannesburg, South Africa	Hard	(South Africa) Bob Hewitt	(United States) Charlie Pasarell (United States) Erik van Dillen	6–2, 6–0
39.	1977	La Costa, California, US	Hard	(South Africa) Bob Hewitt	(Australia) Ray Ruffels (Australia) Allan Stone	6–4, 6–2
40.	1977	Pacific Southwest Championships, US	Carpet	(South Africa) Bob Hewitt	(United States) Robert Lutz (United States) Stan Smith	6–3, 6–4
41.	1977	Jackson, US	Carpet	(South Africa) Bob Hewitt	(Australia) Phil Dent (Australia) Ken Rosewall	6–2, 7–6
42.	1977	US Open, New York City	Clay	(South Africa) Bob Hewitt	(United States) Brian Gottfried (Mexico) Raúl Ramírez	6–4, 6–0
43.	1977	Los Angeles, US	Hard	(United States) Sandy Mayer	(United States) Tom Leonard (United States) Mike Machette	6–2, 6–3
44.	1977	Madrid, Spain	Clay	(South Africa) Bob Hewitt	(Spain) Antonio Muñoz (Spain) Manuel Orantes	6–7, 7–6, 6–3, 6–1
45.	1977	Vienna, Austria	Hard (i)	(South Africa) Bob Hewitt	(Poland) Wojtek Fibak (Czechoslovakia) Jan Kodeš	6–4, 6–3
46.	1977	Cologne, Germany	Carpet	(South Africa) Bob Hewitt	(United States) Fred McNair (United States) Sherwood Stewart	6–3, 7–5
47.	1977	Wembley, United Kingdom	Hard (i)	(United States) Sandy Mayer	(United States) Brian Gottfried (Mexico) Raúl Ramírez	6–3, 7–6
48.	1978	Masters, New York City	Carpet	(South Africa) Bob Hewitt	(United States) Bob Lutz (United States) Stan Smith	7–5, 7–6, 6–3
49.	1978	Baltimore, US	Carpet	(United States) Fred McNair	(United Kingdom) Roger Taylor (Italy) Antonio Zugarelli	6–3, 7–5
50.	1978	Philadelphia WCT, US	Carpet	(South Africa) Bob Hewitt	(United States) Vitas Gerulaitis (United States) Sandy Mayer	6–4, 6–4
51.	1978	Richmond WCT, US	Carpet	(South Africa) Bob Hewitt	(United States) Vitas Gerulaitis (United States) Sandy Mayer	6–3, 7–5
52.	1978	St. Louis WCT, US	Carpet	(South Africa) Bob Hewitt	(Poland) Wojtek Fibak (Netherlands) Tom Okker	6–3, 6–2
53.	1978	Denver, US	Carpet	(South Africa) Bob Hewitt	(United States) Fred McNair (United States) Sherwood Stewart	6–3, 6–2
54.	1978	Johannesburg, South Africa	Hard	(South Africa) Bob Hewitt	(Australia) Colin Dibley (Australia) Geoff Masters	7–5, 7–6
55.	1978	Queen's Club Championships, London	Grass	(South Africa) Bob Hewitt	(United States) Fred McNair (Mexico) Raúl Ramírez	6–2, 7–5
56.	1978	Wimbledon, London	Grass	(South Africa) Bob Hewitt	(United States) Peter Fleming (United States) John McEnroe	6–1, 6–4, 6–2
57.	1979	Stuttgart Outdoor, Germany	Clay	(Switzerland) Colin Dowdeswell	(Poland) Wojtek Fibak (Czechoslovakia) Pavel Složil	6–4, 6–2, 2–6, 6–4
58.	1979	Basel, Switzerland	Hard (i)	(South Africa) Bob Hewitt	(United States) Brian Gottfried (Mexico) Raúl Ramírez	6–3, 6–4
59.	1979	Vienna, Austria	Hard (i)	(South Africa) Bob Hewitt	(United States) Brian Gottfried (Mexico) Raúl Ramírez	6–4, 3–6, 6–1
60.	1979	Johannesburg, South Africa	Hard	(South Africa) Bob Hewitt	(United States) Mike Cahill (United Kingdom) Buster Mottram	1–6, 6–1, 6–4
61.	1980	Johannesburg, South Africa	Hard	(South Africa) Bob Hewitt	(Switzerland) Colin Dowdeswell (Switzerland) Heinz Günthardt	6–4, 6–3
62.	1980	Stuttgart Outdoor, Germany	Clay	(Switzerland) Colin Dowdeswell	(New Zealand) Chris Lewis (South Africa) John Yuill	6–3, 6–4
63.	1981	Brussels, Belgium	Carpet	(United States) Sandy Mayer	(South Africa) Kevin Curren (United States) Steve Denton	4–6, 6–3, 6–3
64.	1982	Johannesburg, South Africa	Hard	(United States) Brian Gottfried	(Israel) Shlomo Glickstein (Zimbabwe) Andrew Pattison	6–2, 6–2
