= Paul Gerken =

American tennis player

- Country (sports): United States
- Residence: East Norwalk, Connecticut
- Born: March 15, 1950 (age 75); New York
- Height: 6 ft 1 in (1.85 m)
- Turned pro: 1972
- Plays: Right-handed

Singles
- Career record: 109–112
- Career titles: 0
- Highest ranking: No. 35 (August 23, 1973)

Grand Slam singles results
- French Open: 4R (1973)
- Wimbledon: 2R (1975)
- US Open: 3R (1968, 1972, 1974)

Doubles
- Career record: 56–90
- Career titles: 0

Grand Slam doubles results
- French Open: 3R (1974)
- Wimbledon: 2R (1972)
- US Open: 2R (68, 70, 71, 73, 74, 75, 77)

Paul Gerken (born March 15, 1950) is a former professional tennis player from the United States.

== Early life and career ==
Gerken was born in New York but his family moved to Norwalk, Connecticut a year after his birth. When he was only 14 he was the top ranked junior in New England for the 16-year-old age division. In 1968 he was called up to the American junior Davis Cup team. He was the third ranked junior in the country at the time. He was runner-up to Dick Stockton at the Orange Bowl 18s in 1968. A student at Norwalk High School, he won the Fairfield County Interscholastic Athletic Conference singles championship in 1967 and 1968.

== College years ==
Gerken attended Stanford University on a tennis scholarship and while there was an All-American college player. He later transferred to Trinity University, in San Antonio, Texas, where he played beside Dick Stockton and Brian Gottfried. Gerken was also an All-American at Trinity University and was a member of the team which won the NCAA Championship in 1972. He also reached the NCAA doubles final that year.

== Professional career ==
Gerken competed in the main singles draw at the US Open every year from 1968 to 1975, as well as in 1977. He appeared three times in both the French Open and Wimbledon Championships. His best performance in a Grand Slam tournament came at the 1973 French Open, where he had wins over Eric Deblicker, Torben Ulrich and Guillermo Vilas, before losing his fourth round match to Roger Taylor, in five sets.

He never won a Grand Prix or WCT title during his career, but reached six finals, two in singles and four in doubles.

Gerken had a winning record against Björn Borg, beating him twice, in 1973 and 1974, and losing just once. He also defeated Ilie Năstase at Salt Lake City in 1973, John Newcombe at Hamburg the same year and Arthur Ashe at a Tokyo WCT tournament in 1974.

He had surgery in 1975 for a torn rotator cuff and as a result didn't feature at all in the 1976 tennis season. His comeback in 1977 was unsuccessful and he retired the following year.

== Coaching ==
Gerken was the head tennis coach for the men's team at Columbia University from 1979 to 1982. He continued to coach in the New England area until 2011.

Paul Gerken was also the Head Tennis Professional at the Westside Tennis Club in Forest Hills NY

== Grand Prix/WCT career finals ==
=== Singles: 2 (0–2) ===
Result	W/L	Year	Tournament	Surface	Opponent	Score
Loss	0–1	1973	Salt Lake City, United States	Hard	(United States) Jimmy Connors	1–6, 2–6
Loss	0–2	1973	Calgary, Canada	Carpet	(Romania) Ilie Năstase	4–6, 6–7

=== Doubles: 4 (0–4) ===
Result	W/L	Year	Tournament	Surface	Partner	Opponents	Score
Loss	0–1	1972	Cincinnati, United States	Clay	(Venezuela) Humphrey Hose	(South Africa) Bob Hewitt (South Africa) Frew McMillan	6–7, 4–6
Loss	0–2	1973	Baltimore, United States	Hard	(United States) Sandy Mayer	(United States) Jimmy Connors (United States) Clark Graebner	6–3, 2–6, 3–6
Loss	0–3	1973	Hong Kong	Hard	(United States) Brian Gottfried	(Australia) Colin Dibley (Australia) Rod Laver	3–6, 7–5, 15–17
Loss	0–4	1975	Dayton, United States	Carpet	(United States) Brian Gottfried	(Australia) Ray Ruffels (Australia) Allan Stone	6–7, 5–7
