= Pat Cramer =

South African tennis player

- Country (sports): South Africa
- Born: 21 March 1947 (age 77); Transvaal, South Africa
- Plays: Right-handed

Singles
- Career record: 42–92
- Highest ranking: No. 95 (26 September 1973)

Grand Slam singles results
- French Open: 2R (1973)
- Wimbledon: 4R (1972)
- US Open: 2R (1973)

Doubles
- Career record: 54–77
- Career titles: 3

Grand Slam doubles results
- French Open: 2R (1973)
- Wimbledon: 1R (1971, 1972, 1975)
- US Open: 3R (1970, 1976)

Grand Slam mixed doubles results
- French Open: 1R (1972)
- Wimbledon: SF (1972)
- US Open: QF (1972)

Pat Cramer (born 21 March 1947) is a former professional tennis player from South Africa. He enjoyed most of his tennis success while playing doubles. During his career, he won three doubles titles.

== Career finals ==
=== Doubles (3 titles, 1 runner-up) ===
Result	No.	Year	Tournament	Surface	Partner	Opponents	Score
Win	1.	1973	Birmingham, U.S.	Hard	(West Germany) Jürgen Fassbender	(United States) Clark Graebner (Romania) Ion Țiriac	6–4, 7–5
Win	2.	1974	Philadelphia WCT, U.S.	Carpet	(United States) Mike Estep	(France) Jean-Baptiste Chanfreau (France) Georges Goven	6–1, 6–1
Loss	1.	1974	Hampton, U.S.	Carpet	(United States) Mike Estep	(Socialist Federal Republic of Yugoslavia) Željko Franulović (Socialist Federal Republic of Yugoslavia) Nikola Pilić	6–4, 5–7, 1–6
Win	3.	1976	Louisville, U.S.	Clay	(South Africa) Byron Bertram	(United States) Stan Smith (United States) Erik van Dillen	6–3, 6–4
