= Mike Estep =

American tennis player

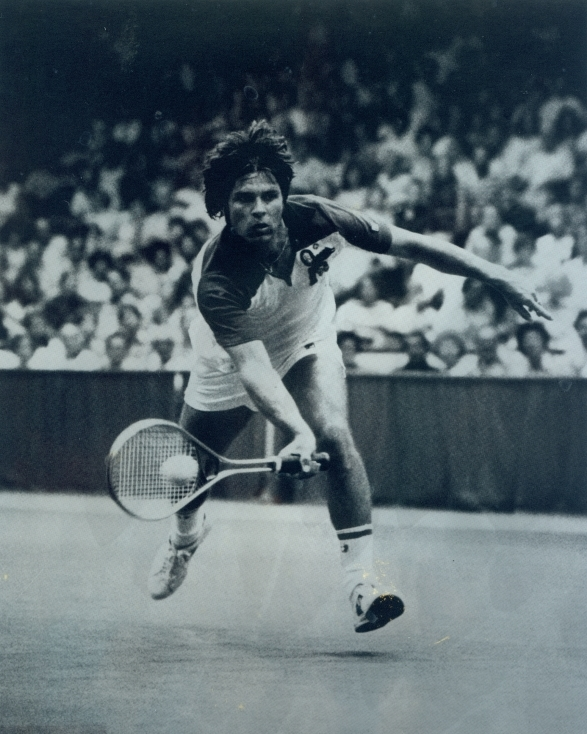
- Country (sports): United States
- Residence: Hurst, Texas, U.S.
- Born: July 19, 1949 (age 77) Dallas, Texas, U.S.
- Height: 5 ft 8 in (1.73 m)
- Turned pro: 1969 (amateur from 1966)
- Retired: 1983
- Plays: Right-handed

Singles
- Career record: 117–179
- Career titles: 2
- Highest ranking: No. 59 (August 23, 1973)

Grand Slam singles results
- Australian Open: 3R (1982)
- French Open: 2R (1973, 1975)
- Wimbledon: 4R (1975)
- US Open: 2R (1975)

Doubles
- Career record: 182–168 (Open era)
- Career titles: 7 (Open era)

Grand Slam doubles results
- Australian Open: QF (1980, 1982)

Mike Estep (born July 19, 1949) is a former professional tennis player from the United States.

During his career Estep won 2 singles titles and 7 doubles titles. He achieved a career-high singles ranking of World No. 59 in August 1973.

In 1983 until 1986 he coached Martina Navratilova. Later he worked with Carling Bassett, Hana Mandlíková, Jana Novotná and Arantxa Sánchez Vicario.

He was a board member of the Association of Tennis Professionals from 1982 to 1989, holding the position of chairman of the ATP ranking Committee at the same time. He also worked with the U.S. Tennis Association, creating a method for ranking juniors in 1999 that is now used nationwide, and serving on the junior development council for Texas from 1993 to 1995.

Estep resides in Hurst, Texas.

== Early life ==
Estep grew up in Dallas, where he graduated from the St. Mark's School of Texas. As a junior tennis player, Estep held a No 1 national ranking for five straight years (from 1963 to 1967). Estep was named the Texas High School Player of the Year, and led the U.S. to the Sunshine Cup Title and played on the U.S. Junior Davis Cup Team. When Estep and George Taylor won the USTA national junior doubles tournament, they became the first team of Texans to win a national tennis championship.

== College tennis ==
At Rice University, Estep was an All American tennis player for three years. As a senior in 1970, he won the Southwest Conference titles in both singles and doubles. At the NCAA Division 1 annual tournament, Estep was an NCAA doubles semifinalist (1968), a singles finalist (1969), and a singles semifinalist (1970). He graduated from Rice with a degree in political science.

== Grand Prix and WCT finals ==
=== Singles: 4 (2 titles, 2 runner-ups) ===
Result	W/L	Date	Tournament	Surface	Opponent	Score
Win	1–0	Aug 1973	Merion, U.S.	Grass	(United States) Gene Scott	7–5, 3–6, 7–6, 3–6, 7–5
Win	2–0	Feb 1976	Khartoum, Sudan	Hard	(Brazil) Thomaz Koch	6–4, 6–7, 6–4, 6–3
Loss	2–1	May 1982	Tampa, U.S.	Hard	(United States) Brian Gottfried	7–6^{(8–6)}, 2–6, 4–6
Loss	2–2	Jul 1982	Newport, U.S.	Grass	(United States) Hank Pfister	1–6, 5–7

=== Doubles: 16 (7 titles, 9 runner-ups) ===
Result	W/L	Year	Tournament	Surface	Partner	Opponents	Score
Win	1–0	Jan 1973	Omaha, U.S.	Hard (i)	(United States) William Brown	(United States) Jimmy Connors (Spain) Juan Gisbert Sr.	default
Win	2–0	Feb 1973	Salt Lake City, U.S.	Hard (i)	(Mexico) Raúl Ramírez	(Czechoslovakia) Jiří Hřebec (Czechoslovakia) Jan Kukal	6–4, 7–6
Win	3–0	Feb 1973	Calgary, Canada	Indoor	(Romania) Ilie Năstase	(Hungary) Szabolcs Baranyi (Hungary) Péter Szőke	6–7, 7–5, 6–3
Win	4–0	Apr 1973	Valencia, Spain	Clay	(Romania) Ion Țiriac	(Belgium) Patrick Hombergen (Belgium) Bernard Mignot	6–4, 1–6, 10–8
Loss	4–1	Apr 1973	Barcelona, Spain	Clay	(Romania) Ion Țiriac	(Spain) Juan Gisbert Sr. (Spain) Manuel Orantes	4–6, 6–7
Win	5–1	Nov 1973	Djakarta, Indonesia	Hard	(Australia) Ian Fletcher	(Australia) John Newcombe (Australia) Allan Stone	7–5, 6–4
Win	6–1	Jan 1974	Philadelphia WCT, U.S.	Carpet	(South Africa) Pat Cramer	(France) Jean-Baptiste Chanfreau (France) Georges Goven	6–1, 6–1
Loss	6–2	Mar 1974	Hampton, U.S.	Carpet	(South Africa) Pat Cramer	(Socialist Federal Republic of Yugoslavia) Željko Franulović (Socialist Federal Republic of Yugoslavia) Nikola Pilić	6–4, 5–7, 1–6
Loss	6–3	Oct 1974	Melbourne, Australia	Clay	(Australia) Paul Kronk	(United States) Grover Raz Reid (Australia) Allan Stone	6–7, 4–6
Loss	6–4	Nov 1974	Manila, Philippines	Clay	(Mexico) Marcello Lara	(Australia) Syd Ball (Australia) Ross Case	3–6, 6–7, 7–9
Win	7–4	Mar 1975	Washington Indoor WCT, U.S.	Carpet	(New Zealand) Jeff Simpson	(India) Anand Amritraj (India) Vijay Amritraj	7–6, 6–3
Loss	7–5	Apr 1975	Houston, U.S.	Clay	(New Zealand) Jeff Simpson	(United States) Robert Lutz (United States) Stan Smith	5–7, 6–7
Loss	7–6	Aug 1975	Boston, U.S.	Clay	(United States) John Andrews	(United States) Brian Gottfried (Mexico) Raúl Ramírez	6–4, 3–6, 6–7
Loss	7–7	Nov 1976	Cologne, Germany	Carpet	(Rhodesia) Colin Dowdeswell	(South Africa) Bob Hewitt (South Africa) Frew McMillan	1–6, 6–3, 6–7
Loss	7–8	Jul 1981	Stuttgart Outdoor, Germany	Clay	(Australia) Mark Edmondson	(Australia) Peter McNamara (Australia) Paul McNamee	6–2, 4–6, 6–7
Loss	7–9	Oct 1981	Brisbane, Australia	Grass	(Australia) Mark Edmondson	(Australia) Rod Frawley (New Zealand) Chris Lewis	5–7, 6–4, 6–7

== Coaching ==
Estep entered coaching after retiring from competitive tennis in 1983.

He is best known for coaching Martina Navratilova during her rise to dominance.
