= 1977 World Championship Tennis circuit =

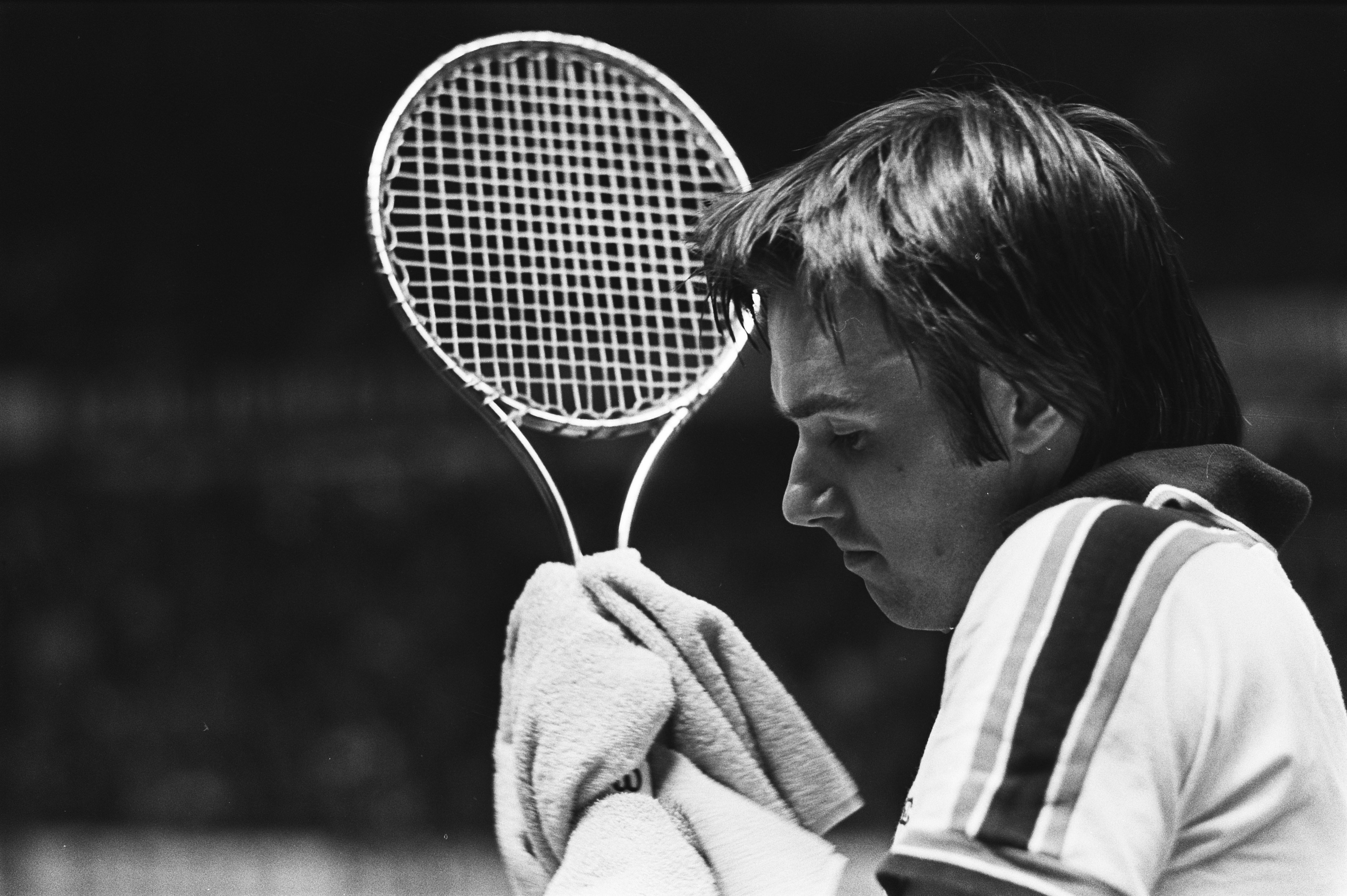
- Connors reached most finals

Details
- Duration: 12 January – 10 May
- Edition: 10th
- Tournaments: 13

Achievements (singles)
- Most titles: (United States) Dick Stockton (United States) Jimmy Connors (3)
- Most finals: (United States) Jimmy Connors (5)
- Points leader: (United States) Dick Stockton (520)

The 1977 season of the World Championship Tennis (WCT) circuit was one of the two rival professional male tennis circuits of 1977. It was organized by World Championship Tennis (WCT) and consisted of a preliminary series of twelve tournaments leading up to a singles play-off in Dallas and doubles play-off in Kansas City in May. 23 players participated and the season final was played by the eight best performers. It was won by American Jimmy Connors who defeated compatriot Dick Stockton in four sets. The total prize money for the 1977 WCT circuit was $2,400,000.

Additionally there were three special events that did not count towards the standings; the Aetna World Cup held in Hartford between America and Australia (10–13 March), the $320,000 Challenge Cup in Las Vegas (14–20 November) and the Tournament of Champions held in Lakeway, Texas (10–13 March, 10–13 July) and Madison Square Garden, New York (17 September).

== Borg lawsuit ==
In February the WCT sued Björn Borg, as well as his management company IMG claiming that Borg had committed a breach of contract by electing to participate in the competing 1977 Grand Prix circuit instead of the WCT circuit. Borg eventually played a single WCT event, the Monte Carlo WCT, and won the tournament. As part of the settlement Borg committed to playing six or eight WCT events in 1978 which were then part of the Grand Prix circuit.

== Overview ==
Date	Tournament	Location	Draw	Prize Money	Surface	Winner	Finalist	Score
12 January	Alabama WCT	Birmingham, Alabama, U.S.	16S / 8D	$175,000	Carpet (i)	(United States) Jimmy Connors	(United States) Bill Scanlon	6–3, 6–3
24 January	U.S. Pro Indoor	Philadelphia, U.S.	64S / 32D	$200,000	Carpet (i)	(United States) Dick Stockton	(United States) Jimmy Connors	3–6, 6–4, 3–6, 6–1, 6–2
31 January	Richmond Tennis Classic	Richmond, Virginia, U.S.	16S / 8D	$100,000	Carpet (i)	(Netherlands) Tom Okker	(United States) Vitas Gerulaitis	3–6, 6–3, 6–4
7 February	Mexico City WCT	Mexico City, Mexico	16S / 8D	$100,000	Carpet (i)	(Romania) Ilie Năstase	(Poland) Wojciech Fibak	4–6, 6–2, 7–6
15 February	Toronto Indoor WCT	Toronto, Canada	16S / 8D	$100,000	Carpet (i)	(United States) Dick Stockton	(United States) Jimmy Connors	5–6, ret.
1 March	Monterrey WCT	Monterrey, Mexico	16S / 8D	$100,000	Carpet (i)	(Poland) Wojciech Fibak	(United States) Vitas Gerulaitis	6–4, 6–3
16 March	St. Louis WCT	St. Louis, U.S.	16S / 8D	$100,000	Hard (i)	(United States) Jimmy Connors	(United States) John Alexander	7–6, 6–2
22 March	Rotterdam WCT	Rotterdam, Netherlands	16S / 8D	$100,000	Carpet (i)	(United States) Dick Stockton	(Romania) Ilie Năstase	2–6, 6–3, 6–3
28 March	London WCT	London, UK	16S / 8D	$100,000	Carpet (i)	(United States) Eddie Dibbs	(United States) Vitas Gerulaitis	7–6, 6–7, 6–4
5 April	Monte Carlo WCT	Roquebrune-Cap-Martin, France	16S / 8D	$100,000	Clay	(Sweden) Björn Borg	(Italy) Corrado Barazzutti	6–3, 7–5, 6–0
11 April	Houston WCT	Houston, U.S.	16S / 8D	$100,000	Har-Tru	(Italy) Adriano Panatta	(United States) Vitas Gerulaitis	7–6, 6–7, 6–1
18 April	Charlotte WCT	Charlotte, North Carolina, U.S.	16S / 8D	$100,000	Har-Tru	(Italy) Corrado Barazzutti	(United States) Eddie Dibbs	7–6, 6–0
4 May	Kansas WCT Doubles Finals	Kansas City, U.S.	8D	$200,000	Carpet (i)	(India) Vijay Amritraj (United States) Dick Stockton	(United States) Vitas Gerulaitis (Italy) Adriano Panatta	7–6, 7–6, 4–6, 6–3
10 May	Dallas WCT Singles Finals	Dallas, Texas, U.S.	8S	$200,000	Carpet (i)	(United States) Jimmy Connors	(United States) Dick Stockton	6–7, 6–1, 6–4, 6–3

== Schedule ==
The schedule of events on the 1977 WCT circuit, with player progression documented until the quarterfinals stage.

=== January ===
Week	Tournament	Champions	Runners-up	Semifinalists	Quarterfinalists
12 Jan	Alabama WCT; Birmingham, United States; Carpet (i) – $100,000 – 16S/8D	(United States) Jimmy Connors; 6–3, 6–3	(United States) Bill Scanlon	(United States) Eddie Dibbs (South Africa) Ray Moore	(South Africa) Cliff Drysdale (United States) Sandy Mayer (United States) Vitas Gerulaitis (Romania) Ilie Năstase
12 Jan	Alabama WCT; Birmingham, United States; Carpet (i) – $100,000 – 16S/8D	(Poland) Wojciech Fibak (Netherlands) Tom Okker; 6–3, 6–4	(United States) Billy Martin (United States) Bill Scanlon	(United States) Eddie Dibbs (South Africa) Ray Moore	(South Africa) Cliff Drysdale (United States) Sandy Mayer (United States) Vitas Gerulaitis (Romania) Ilie Năstase
24 Jan	U.S. Pro Indoor; Philadelphia, United States; Carpet (i) – $200,000 – 64S/32D; Singles – Doubles	(United States) Dick Stockton; 3–6, 6–4, 3–6, 6–1, 6–2	(United States) Jimmy Connors	(United States) Jeff Borowiak (South Africa) Cliff Drysdale	(Australia) Ken Rosewall (India) Vijay Amritraj (South Africa) Bernard Mitton (Australia) Tony Roche
24 Jan	U.S. Pro Indoor; Philadelphia, United States; Carpet (i) – $200,000 – 64S/32D; Singles – Doubles	(South Africa) Bob Hewitt (South Africa) Frew McMillan; 7–5, 6–3	(Poland) Wojciech Fibak (Netherlands) Tom Okker	(United States) Jeff Borowiak (South Africa) Cliff Drysdale	(Australia) Ken Rosewall (India) Vijay Amritraj (South Africa) Bernard Mitton (Australia) Tony Roche
31 Jan	Fidelity Tournament; Richmond, United States; Carpet (i) – $50,000 – 32S/16D	(Netherlands) Tom Okker; 3–6, 6–3, 6–4	(United States) Vitas Gerulaitis	(Italy) Corrado Barazzutti (Australia) Tony Roche	(Australia) Ross Case (Italy) Adriano Panatta (Spain) Manuel Orantes (Romania) Ilie Năstase
31 Jan	Fidelity Tournament; Richmond, United States; Carpet (i) – $50,000 – 32S/16D	(Poland) Wojciech Fibak (Netherlands) Tom Okker; 6–4, 6–4	(Australia) Ross Case (Australia) Tony Roche	(Italy) Corrado Barazzutti (Australia) Tony Roche	(Australia) Ross Case (Italy) Adriano Panatta (Spain) Manuel Orantes (Romania) Ilie Năstase

=== February ===
Week	Tournament	Champions	Runners-up	Semifinalists	Quarterfinalists
7 Feb	Mexico City WCT; Mexico City, Mexico; Carpet (i) – $100,000 – 16S/8D	(Romania) Ilie Năstase; 4–6, 6–2, 7–6	(Poland) Wojciech Fibak	(Italy) Adriano Panatta (Australia) Ken Rosewall	(South Africa) Cliff Drysdale (Czechoslovakia) Jan Kodeš (United States) Vitas Gerulaitis (Spain) Manuel Orantes
7 Feb	Mexico City WCT; Mexico City, Mexico; Carpet (i) – $100,000 – 16S/8D	(Poland) Wojciech Fibak (Netherlands) Tom Okker; 6–2, 6–3	(Romania) Ilie Năstase (Italy) Adriano Panatta	(Italy) Adriano Panatta (Australia) Ken Rosewall	(South Africa) Cliff Drysdale (Czechoslovakia) Jan Kodeš (United States) Vitas Gerulaitis (Spain) Manuel Orantes
16 Feb	Toronto Indoor; Toronto, Canada	(United States) Dick Stockton; 5–6 ret.	(United States) Jimmy Connors	(United States) Eddie Dibbs (Netherlands) Tom Okker	(Australia) Rod Laver (Australia) Ken Rosewall (Australia) Tony Roche (Australia) Ross Case
16 Feb	Toronto Indoor; Toronto, Canada	(Poland) Wojciech Fibak (Netherlands) Tom Okker; 6–4, 6–1	(Australia) Ross Case (Australia) Tony Roche	(United States) Eddie Dibbs (Netherlands) Tom Okker	(Australia) Rod Laver (Australia) Ken Rosewall (Australia) Tony Roche (Australia) Ross Case
28 Feb	Monterrey WCT; Monterrey, Mexico; Carpet (i) – $100,000 – 16S/8D	(Poland) Wojciech Fibak; 6–4, 6–3	(United States) Vitas Gerulaitis	(South Africa) Cliff Drysdale (United States) Bill Scanlon	(Spain) Manuel Orantes (Mexico) Raúl Ramírez (United States) Harold Solomon (United States) Eddie Dibbs
28 Feb	Monterrey WCT; Monterrey, Mexico; Carpet (i) – $100,000 – 16S/8D	(Australia) Ross Case (Poland) Wojciech Fibak; 3–6, 6–3, 6–4	(United States) Billy Martin (United States) Bill Scanlon	(South Africa) Cliff Drysdale (United States) Bill Scanlon	(Spain) Manuel Orantes (Mexico) Raúl Ramírez (United States) Harold Solomon (United States) Eddie Dibbs

=== March ===
Week	Tournament	Champions	Runners-up	Semifinalists	Quarterfinalists
16 Mar	St. Louis Tennis Classic; Carpet (i) – $100,000 – 16S/8D; St. Louis, United States	(United States) Jimmy Connors; 7–6, 6–2	(Australia) John Alexander	(United States) Harold Solomon (Romania) Ilie Năstase	(South Africa) Cliff Drysdale (United States) Raz Reid (Australia) Ken Rosewall (South Africa) Bernard Mitton
16 Mar	St. Louis Tennis Classic; Carpet (i) – $100,000 – 16S/8D; St. Louis, United States	(Romania) Ilie Năstase (Italy) Adriano Panatta; 6–4, 3–6, 7–6	(India) Vijay Amritraj (United States) Dick Stockton	(United States) Harold Solomon (Romania) Ilie Năstase	(South Africa) Cliff Drysdale (United States) Raz Reid (Australia) Ken Rosewall (South Africa) Bernard Mitton
22 Mar	ABN World Tennis Tournament WCT; Rotterdam, Netherlands; Carpet (i) – $100,000 – 16S/8D; Singles	(United States) Dick Stockton; 2–6, 6–3, 6–3	(Romania) Ilie Năstase	(Poland) Wojciech Fibak (United Kingdom) Mark Cox	(India) Vijay Amritraj (Australia) John Alexander (Italy) Corrado Barazzutti (South Africa) Cliff Drysdale
22 Mar	ABN World Tennis Tournament WCT; Rotterdam, Netherlands; Carpet (i) – $100,000 – 16S/8D; Singles	(Netherlands) Tom Okker (Poland) Wojciech Fibak; 6–4, 6–4	(India) Vijay Amritraj (United States) Dick Stockton	(Poland) Wojciech Fibak (United Kingdom) Mark Cox	(India) Vijay Amritraj (Australia) John Alexander (Italy) Corrado Barazzutti (South Africa) Cliff Drysdale
28 Mar	Rothmans International London; London, UK; Carpet (i) – $100,000 – 16S/8D	(United States) Eddie Dibbs; 7–6, 6–7, 6–4	(United States) Vitas Gerulaitis	(India) Vijay Amritraj (United States) Dick Stockton	(Romania) Ilie Năstase (Australia) Ross Case (Poland) Wojciech Fibak (United States) Harold Solomon
28 Mar	Rothmans International London; London, UK; Carpet (i) – $100,000 – 16S/8D	(Romania) Ilie Năstase (Italy) Adriano Panatta; 7–6^{(7–5)}, 6–7^{(3–7)}, 6–3	(United Kingdom) Mark Cox (United States) Eddie Dibbs	(India) Vijay Amritraj (United States) Dick Stockton	(Romania) Ilie Năstase (Australia) Ross Case (Poland) Wojciech Fibak (United States) Harold Solomon

=== April ===
Week	Tournament	Champions	Runners-up	Semifinalists	Quarterfinalists
5 Apr	Monte Carlo WCT; Monte Carlo, Monaco; Clay – $100,000 – 16S/8D	(Sweden) Björn Borg; 6–3, 7–5, 6–0	(Italy) Corrado Barazzutti	(Czechoslovakia) Jan Kodeš (Argentina) Guillermo Vilas	(Hungary) Balázs Taróczy (Poland) Wojciech Fibak (United States) Eddie Dibbs (Italy) Adriano Panatta
5 Apr	Monte Carlo WCT; Monte Carlo, Monaco; Clay – $100,000 – 16S/8D	(France) François Jauffret (Czechoslovakia) Jan Kodeš; 2–6, 6–3, 6–2	(Poland) Wojciech Fibak (Netherlands) Tom Okker	(Czechoslovakia) Jan Kodeš (Argentina) Guillermo Vilas	(Hungary) Balázs Taróczy (Poland) Wojciech Fibak (United States) Eddie Dibbs (Italy) Adriano Panatta
11 Apr	Houston Open; Houston, United States	(Italy) Adriano Panatta; 7–6, 6–7, 6–1	(United States) Vitas Gerulaitis	(United States) Eddie Dibbs (Romania) Ilie Năstase	(Australia) Ken Rosewall (United States) Harold Solomon (Australia) Tony Roche (Australia) Ross Case
11 Apr	Houston Open; Houston, United States	(Romania) Ilie Năstase (Italy) Adriano Panatta; 6–3, 6–4	(Australia) John Alexander (Australia) Phil Dent	(United States) Eddie Dibbs (Romania) Ilie Năstase	(Australia) Ken Rosewall (United States) Harold Solomon (Australia) Tony Roche (Australia) Ross Case
18 Apr	Charlotte Tennis Classic; Charlotte, United States; Clay – $200,000 – 16S/8D	(Italy) Corrado Barazzutti; 7–6, 6–0	(United States) Eddie Dibbs	(Italy) Adriano Panatta (Australia) John Alexander	(Netherlands) Tom Okker (South Africa) Cliff Drysdale (United States) Harold Solomon (Australia) Tony Roche
18 Apr	Charlotte Tennis Classic; Charlotte, United States; Clay – $200,000 – 16S/8D	(Netherlands) Tom Okker (Australia) Ken Rosewall; 6–1, 3–6, 7–6	(Italy) Corrado Barazzutti (Italy) Adriano Panatta	(Italy) Adriano Panatta (Australia) John Alexander	(Netherlands) Tom Okker (South Africa) Cliff Drysdale (United States) Harold Solomon (Australia) Tony Roche

=== May ===
Week	Tournament	Champions	Runners-up	Semifinalists	Quarterfinalists
10 May	WCT Finals; Dallas, United States; Tour Finals; Carpet (i) – $100,000 – 8S; Singles	(United States) Jimmy Connors; 6–7, 6–1, 6–4, 6–3	(United States) Dick Stockton	(United States) Eddie Dibbs (United States) Vitas Gerulaitis	(Italy) Adriano Panatta (South Africa) Cliff Drysdale (Romania) Ilie Năstase (Poland) Wojciech Fibak

== Special events ==
These WCT events did not count towards the standings.

Week of	Tournament	Champions	Runners-up	Semifinalists	Quarterfinalists
10 Mar	World Cup; Hartford, United States	USA; 7–0	Australia	N.A.	N.A.
25 Apr	Caesar's Palace Challenge; Las Vegas, United States $100,000	(Romania) Ilie Năstase; 3–6, 7–6, 6–4, 7–5	(United States) Jimmy Connors	N.A.	N.A.
10 Mar – 10 Jul – 17 Sep	Shakeys Tournament of Champions; Lakeway, United States; New York City, United States (final)	(United States) Harold Solomon; 6–5^{(7–5)}, 6–2, 2–6, 0–6, 6–3	(Australia) Ken Rosewall	(United States) Dick Stockton (United States) Eddie Dibbs	(Australia) Phil Dent (United States) Jimmy Connors (Romania) Ilie Năstase (India) Vijay Amritraj

== Standings ==
Player	Tournaments Played	Tournaments Won	Matches Won	Matches Lost	Points
(United States) Dick Stockton ^{*}	7	3	15	4	520
(United States) Eddie Dibbs ^{*}	9	1	17	8	500
(United States) Jimmy Connors ^{*}	5	2	12	3	460
(Romania) Ilie Năstase ^{*}	8	1	15	7	440
(South Africa) Cliff Drysdale ^{*}	9	0	10	8	420
(Poland) Wojtek Fibak ^{*}	9	1	11	8	420
(United States) Vitas Gerulaitis ^{*}	7	0	15	7	420
(Italy) Adriano Panatta ^{*}	9	1	11	8	400
(Italy) Corrado Barazzutti	7	1	10	6	330
(Australia) Ken Rosewall	8	0	7	8	320
(United States) Harold Solomon	9	0	7	8	320

^{*} Qualified for the WCT Finals.

== See also ==
- 1977 Grand Prix circuit
