= 1976 World Championship Tennis circuit =

Tennis competition in the US

- Ashe (left) was prize money leader

Details
- Duration: 5 January 1976 – 9 May 1976
- Edition: 9th
- Tournaments: 26

Achievements (singles)
- Most titles: (United States) Arthur Ashe (5)
- Most finals: (United States) Arthur Ashe (6)
- Prize money leader: (United States) Arthur Ashe ($253,013)
- Points leader: (United States) Arthur Ashe (860)

The 1976 World Championship Tennis circuit was one of the two rival professional men's tennis circuits of 1976. It was organized by World Championship Tennis (WCT) and consisted of a schedule of 25 tournaments leading up to a singles WCT Finals play-off in Dallas and a doubles play-off in Kansas City in May. A total of 54 players participated, 30 players less than in the previous three years, and the group system used in the previous editions was replaced by a single pool. The U.S. Pro Indoor was the only tournament in which all players participated, all other tournaments had a 16 men draw. The season final was played by the eight best performers and was won by the Swede Björn Borg who defeated Guillermo Vilas from Argentina in four sets. The total prize money for the 1976 WCT circuit was $2,400,000, including a $320,000 Avis Challenge Cup round–robin special event played in Hawaii in January and May.

The Aetna World Cup between teams of the US and Australia was played in March in Hartford and was won by the US 6–1.

== Overview ==
| Date | Tournament | Location | Draw | Prize Money | Surface | Champion | Runner-up | Score |
|---|---|---|---|---|---|---|---|---|
| 5 Jan | Monterrey WCT | Monterrey, Mexico | 16S / 8D | $60,000 | Carpet (i) | (United States) Eddie Dibbs | (United States) Harold Solomon | 7–6, 6–2 |
| 7 Jan | Columbus WCT | Columbus, Ohio, U.S. | 16S / 8D | $60,000 | Carpet (i) | (United States) Arthur Ashe | (Rhodesia) Andrew Pattison | 3–6, 6–3, 7–6 |
| 12 Jan | Indianapolis WCT | Indianapolis, U.S. | 16S / 8D | | Carpet (i) | (United States) Arthur Ashe | (United States) Vitas Gerulaitis | 6–2, 6–7, 6–4 |
| 14 Jan | Phoenix Cup | Atlanta, U.S. | 16S / 8D | $60,000 | Carpet (i) | (Romania) Ilie Năstase | (United States) Jeff Borowiak | 6–2, 6–4 |
| 26 Jan | U.S. Pro Indoor | Philadelphia, U.S. | 64S / 32D | $118,600 | Carpet (i) | (United States) Jimmy Connors | (Sweden) Björn Borg | 7–6^{(7–5)}, 6–4, 6–0 |
| 2 Feb | Barcelona WCT | Barcelona, Spain | 16S / 8D | $60,000 | Carpet (i) | (United States) Eddie Dibbs | (South Africa) Cliff Drysdale | 6–1, 6–1 |
| 4 Feb | Richmond WCT | Richmond, Virginia, U.S. | 16S / 8D | $60,000 | Carpet (i) | (United States) Arthur Ashe | (United States) Brian Gottfried | 6–2, 6–4 |
| 9 Feb | Lagos WCT | Lagos, Nigeria (Note: The tournament was halted at the semifinal stage due to a coup d'etat attempt in Nigeria and the final was played on April 2 in Caracas, Venezuela during the Caracas WCT tournament.) | 16S / 8D | $60,000 | Clay | (United States) Dick Stockton | (United States) Arthur Ashe | 6–3, 6–2 |
| 10 Feb | Toronto WCT | Toronto, Canada | 16S / 8D | $60,000 | Carpet (i) | (Sweden) Björn Borg | (United States) Vitas Gerulaitis | 2–6, 6–3, 6–1 |
| 17 Feb | St. Louis WCT | St. Louis, U.S. | 16S / 8D | $60,000 | Carpet (i) | (Argentina) Guillermo Vilas | (India) Vijay Amritraj | 4–6, 6–0, 6–4 |
| 17 Feb | Rome WCT | Rome, Italy | 16S / 8D | $60,000 | Carpet (i) | (United States) Arthur Ashe | (United States) Bob Lutz | 6–2, 0–6, 6–3 |
| 23 Feb | Fort Worth WCT | Fort Worth, Texas, U.S. | 16S / 8D | $60,000 | Carpet (i) | (Argentina) Guillermo Vilas | (Australia) Phil Dent | 6–7, 6–1, 6–1 |
| 23 Feb | Rotterdam WCT | Rotterdam, Netherlands | 16S / 8D | $60,000 | Carpet (i) | (United States) Arthur Ashe | (United States) Bob Lutz | 6–3, 6–3 |
| 8 Mar | Memphis WCT | Memphis, Tennessee, U.S. | 16S / 8D | $60,000 | Carpet (i) | (India) Vijay Amritraj | (United States) Stan Smith | 6–2, 0–6, 6–0 |
| 8 Mar | Mexico City WCT | Mexico City, Mexico | 16S / 8D | $60,000 | Carpet (i) | (Mexico) Raúl Ramírez | (United States) Eddie Dibbs | 7–6, 6–2 |
| 15 Mar | Washington WCT | Washington, D.C., U.S. | 16S / 8D | $60,000 | Carpet (i) | (United States) Harold Solomon | (New Zealand) Onny Parun | 6–3, 6–1 |
| 15 Mar | Jackson WCT | Jackson, Mississippi, U.S. | 16S / 8D | $60,000 | Carpet (i) | (Australia) Ken Rosewall | (Mexico) Raúl Ramírez | 6–3, 6–3 |
| 29 Mar | Caracas WCT | Caracas, Venezuela | 16S / 8D | $60,000 | Clay | (Mexico) Raúl Ramírez | (Romania) Ilie Năstase | 6–3, 6–4 |
| 29 Mar | São Paulo WCT | São Paulo, Brazil | 16S / 8D | $60,000 | Carpet (i) | (Sweden) Björn Borg | (Argentina) Guillermo Vilas | 7–6^{(7–4)}, 6–2 |
| 5 Apr | Johannesburg WCT | Johannesburg, South Africa | 16S / 8D | | Hard | (New Zealand) Onny Parun | (South Africa) Cliff Drysdale | 7–6, 6–3 |
| 5 Apr | Houston WCT | Houston, U.S. | 16S / 8D | $25,000 | Clay | (United States) Harold Solomon | (Australia) Ken Rosewall | 6–1, 4–6, 6–1 |
| 12 Apr | Monte Carlo WCT | Roquebrune-Cap-Martin, France | 16S / 8D | $60,000 | Clay | (Argentina) Guillermo Vilas | (Poland) Wojciech Fibak | 6–1, 6–1, 6–4 |
| 13 Apr | Charlotte WCT | Charlotte, North Carolina, U.S. | 16S / 8D | | Clay | (Australia) Tony Roche | (United States) Vitas Gerulaitis | 6–3, 3–6, 6–1 |
| 19 Apr | Stockholm WCT | Stockholm, Sweden | 16S / 8D | $60,000 | Carpet (i) | (Poland) Wojciech Fibak | (Romania) Ilie Năstase | 6–4, 7–6^{(8–6)} |
| 19 Apr | Denver WCT | Denver, U.S. | 16S / 8D | $60,000 | Carpet (i) | (United States) Jimmy Connors | (Australia) Ross Case | 7–6, 6–2 |
| 4 May | Dallas WCT Finals | Dallas, U.S. | 8S | $100,000 | Carpet (i) | (Sweden) Björn Borg | (Argentina) Guillermo Vilas | 1–6, 6–1, 7–5, 6–1 |

== Schedule ==
The schedule of events on the 1976 WCT circuit, with player progression documented until the quarterfinals stage.

=== January ===
| Week | Tournament | Champions | Runners-up | Semifinalists | Quarterfinalists |
|---|---|---|---|---|---|
| 5 Jan | Monterrey WCT; Monterrey, Mexico; Carpet (i) – $60,000 – 16S/8D | (United States) Eddie Dibbs; 7–6, 6–2 | (United States) Harold Solomon | (United States) Vitas Gerulaitis (Mexico) Raúl Ramírez | (United States) Brian Gottfried (Mexico) Emilio Montaño (Australia) Geoff Masters (United States) Cliff Richey |
| 5 Jan | Monterrey WCT; Monterrey, Mexico; Carpet (i) – $60,000 – 16S/8D | (United States) Brian Gottfried (Mexico) Raúl Ramírez; 6–2, 4–6, 6–3 | (Australia) Ross Case (Australia) Geoff Masters | (United States) Vitas Gerulaitis (Mexico) Raúl Ramírez | (United States) Brian Gottfried (Mexico) Emilio Montaño (Australia) Geoff Masters (United States) Cliff Richey |
| 7 Jan | Columbus WCT; Columbus, Ohio, US; Carpet (i) – $60,000 – 16S/8D | (United States) Arthur Ashe; 3–6, 6–3, 7–6 | (Rhodesia) Andrew Pattison | (Australia) Phil Dent (South Africa) Cliff Drysdale | (Soviet Union) Alex Metreveli (Australia) Kevin Warwick (United States) Dick Stockton (Netherlands) Tom Okker |
| 7 Jan | Columbus WCT; Columbus, Ohio, US; Carpet (i) – $60,000 – 16S/8D | (South Africa) Bob Hewitt (South Africa) Frew McMillan; 7–6, 6–4 | (United States) Arthur Ashe (Netherlands) Tom Okker | (Australia) Phil Dent (South Africa) Cliff Drysdale | (Soviet Union) Alex Metreveli (Australia) Kevin Warwick (United States) Dick Stockton (Netherlands) Tom Okker |
| 12 Jan | Indianapolis WCT; Indianapolis, US; Carpet (i) – $60,000 – 16S/8D | (United States) Arthur Ashe; 6–2, 6–7, 6–4 | (United States) Vitas Gerulaitis | (Australia) Ray Ruffels (United States) Stan Smith | (United States) Marty Riessen (Australia) Syd Ball (South Africa) Cliff Drysdale (United States) Bob Lutz |
| 12 Jan | Indianapolis WCT; Indianapolis, US; Carpet (i) – $60,000 – 16S/8D | (United States) Robert Lutz (United States) Stan Smith; 6–2, 6–4 | (United States) Vitas Gerulaitis (United States) Tom Gorman | (Australia) Ray Ruffels (United States) Stan Smith | (United States) Marty Riessen (Australia) Syd Ball (South Africa) Cliff Drysdale (United States) Bob Lutz |
| 14 Jan | Phoenix Cup; Atlanta, US; Carpet (i) – $60,000 – 16S/8D | (Romania) Ilie Năstase; 6–2, 6–4 | (United States) Jeff Borowiak | (Soviet Union) Alex Metreveli (Australia) John Alexander | (Sweden) Björn Borg (Czechoslovakia) Jan Kodeš (Zimbabwe) Andrew Pattison (Poland) Wojciech Fibak |
| 14 Jan | Phoenix Cup; Atlanta, US; Carpet (i) – $60,000 – 16S/8D | (Australia) John Alexander (Australia) Phil Dent; 6–3, 6–4 | (Poland) Wojciech Fibak (Germany) Karl Meiler | (Soviet Union) Alex Metreveli (Australia) John Alexander | (Sweden) Björn Borg (Czechoslovakia) Jan Kodeš (Zimbabwe) Andrew Pattison (Poland) Wojciech Fibak |
| 26 Jan | U.S. Pro Indoor; Philadelphia, US; Carpet (i) – $118,000 – 64S/32D; Singles – Doubles | (United States) Jimmy Connors; 7–6^{(7–5)}, 6–4, 6–0 | (Sweden) Björn Borg | (Netherlands) Tom Okker (United States) Dick Stockton | (Czechoslovakia) Jan Kodeš (United States) Eddie Dibbs (United States) Tom Gorman (Australia) Rod Laver |
| 26 Jan | U.S. Pro Indoor; Philadelphia, US; Carpet (i) – $118,000 – 64S/32D; Singles – Doubles | (Australia) Rod Laver (United States) Dennis Ralston; 6–3, 5–7, 7–6^{(7–5)} | (South Africa) Bob Hewitt (South Africa) Frew McMillan | (Netherlands) Tom Okker (United States) Dick Stockton | (Czechoslovakia) Jan Kodeš (United States) Eddie Dibbs (United States) Tom Gorman (Australia) Rod Laver |

=== February ===
| Week | Tournament | Champions | Runners-up | Semifinalists | Quarterfinalists |
|---|---|---|---|---|---|
| 2 Feb | Barcelona WCT; Barcelona, Spain; Carpet (i) – $60,000 – 16S/8D | (United States) Eddie Dibbs; 6–1, 6–1 | (South Africa) Cliff Drysdale | (Australia) Dick Crealy (United Kingdom) Mark Cox | (United States) Erik van Dillen (New Zealand) Brian Fairlie (Germany) Karl Meiler (Poland) Wojciech Fibak |
| 2 Feb | Barcelona WCT; Barcelona, Spain; Carpet (i) – $60,000 – 16S/8D | (United States) Robert Lutz (United States) Stan Smith; 6–3, 6–3 | (Poland) Wojciech Fibak (Germany) Karl Meiler | (Australia) Dick Crealy (United Kingdom) Mark Cox | (United States) Erik van Dillen (New Zealand) Brian Fairlie (Germany) Karl Meiler (Poland) Wojciech Fibak |
| 4 Feb | United Virginia Bank Classic; Richmond, US; Carpet (i) – $60,000 – 32S/16D | (United States) Arthur Ashe; 6–2, 6–4 | (United States) Brian Gottfried | (Mexico) Raúl Ramírez (Netherlands) Tom Okker | (Czechoslovakia) Jiří Hřebec (United States) Billy Martin (Australia) Ross Case (Australia) Geoff Masters |
| 4 Feb | United Virginia Bank Classic; Richmond, US; Carpet (i) – $60,000 – 32S/16D | (United States) Brian Gottfried (Mexico) Raúl Ramírez; 6–4, 7–5 | (United States) Arthur Ashe (Netherlands) Tom Okker | (Mexico) Raúl Ramírez (Netherlands) Tom Okker | (Czechoslovakia) Jiří Hřebec (United States) Billy Martin (Australia) Ross Case (Australia) Geoff Masters |
| 9 Feb | Lagos Tennis Classic; Lagos, Nigeria; Clay – 16S/8D | (United States) Dick Stockton; 6–3, 6–2 | (United States) Arthur Ashe | (United States) Bob Lutz (United States) Jeff Borowiak | (Germany) Karl Meiler (United States) Eddie Dibbs (United States) Harold Solomon (Australia) Dick Crealy |
| 10 Feb | Toronto Indoor; Toronto, Canada | (Sweden) Björn Borg; 2–6, 6–3, 6–1 | (United States) Vitas Gerulaitis | (Romania) Ilie Năstase (United States) Marty Riessen | (Czechoslovakia) Jiří Hřebec (Czechoslovakia) Jan Kodeš (Australia) Tony Roche (India) Vijay Amritraj |
| 10 Feb | Toronto Indoor; Toronto, Canada | (Chile) Jaime Fillol (South Africa) Frew McMillan; 6–7^{(3–7)}, 6–2, 6–3 | (Soviet Union) Alexander Metreveli (Romania) Ilie Năstase | (Romania) Ilie Năstase (United States) Marty Riessen | (Czechoslovakia) Jiří Hřebec (Czechoslovakia) Jan Kodeš (Australia) Tony Roche (India) Vijay Amritraj |
| 17 Feb | Rome WCT; Rome, Italy; Carpet | (United States) Arthur Ashe; 6–2, 0–6, 6–3 | (United States) Bob Lutz | (United States) Dick Stockton (Italy) Adriano Panatta | (Netherlands) Tom Okker (South Africa) Cliff Drysdale (United Kingdom) Mark Cox (United States) Stan Smith |
| 17 Feb | Rome WCT; Rome, Italy; Carpet | (United States) Robert Lutz (United States) Stan Smith; 6–7^{(5–7)}, 6–3, 6–4 | (Australia) Dick Crealy (South Africa) Frew McMillan | (United States) Dick Stockton (Italy) Adriano Panatta | (Netherlands) Tom Okker (South Africa) Cliff Drysdale (United Kingdom) Mark Cox (United States) Stan Smith |
| 17 Feb | St. Louis Tennis Classic; St. Louis, US; Carpet (i) – $60,000 – 32S/16D | (Argentina) Guillermo Vilas; 4–6, 6–0, 6–4 | (India) Vijay Amritraj | (Mexico) Raúl Ramírez (United States) Billy Martin | (United States) Brian Gottfried (Australia) John Alexander (Australia) Ken Rosewall (Spain) Manuel Orantes |
| 17 Feb | St. Louis Tennis Classic; St. Louis, US; Carpet (i) – $60,000 – 32S/16D | (United States) Brian Gottfried (Mexico) Raúl Ramírez; 6–4, 6–2 | (Australia) John Alexander (Australia) Phil Dent | (Mexico) Raúl Ramírez (United States) Billy Martin | (United States) Brian Gottfried (Australia) John Alexander (Australia) Ken Rosewall (Spain) Manuel Orantes |
| 23 Feb | Rotterdam WCT; Rotterdam, Netherlands; Carpet (i) – $60,000 – 32S/16D | (United States) Arthur Ashe; 6–3, 6–3 | (United States) Bob Lutz | (Netherlands) Tom Okker (Australia) Rod Laver | (Poland) Wojciech Fibak (Czechoslovakia) Jan Kodeš (Czechoslovakia) Jiří Hřebec (United States) Stan Smith |
| 23 Feb | Rotterdam WCT; Rotterdam, Netherlands; Carpet (i) – $60,000 – 32S/16D | (Australia) Rod Laver (South Africa) Frew McMillan; 6–1, 6–7^{(4–7)}, 7–6^{(7–5)} | (United States) Arthur Ashe (Netherlands) Tom Okker | (Netherlands) Tom Okker (Australia) Rod Laver | (Poland) Wojciech Fibak (Czechoslovakia) Jan Kodeš (Czechoslovakia) Jiří Hřebec (United States) Stan Smith |
| 24 Feb | Colonial National Invitational; Fort Worth, US; Carpet (i) – 32S/16D | (Argentina) Guillermo Vilas; 6–7, 6–1, 6–1 | (Australia) Phil Dent | (United States) Sandy Mayer (United States) Roscoe Tanner | (United States) Harold Solomon (United States) Sherwood Stewart (United States) Tom Gorman (United States) Cliff Richey |
| 24 Feb | Colonial National Invitational; Fort Worth, US; Carpet (i) – 32S/16D | (United States) Vitas Gerulaitis (United States) Sandy Mayer; 6–4, 7–5 | (United States) Eddie Dibbs (United States) Harold Solomon | (United States) Sandy Mayer (United States) Roscoe Tanner | (United States) Harold Solomon (United States) Sherwood Stewart (United States) Tom Gorman (United States) Cliff Richey |

=== March ===
| Week | Tournament | Champions | Runners-up | Semifinalists | Quarterfinalists |
|---|---|---|---|---|---|
| 8 Mar | U.S. Indoor National Championships; Memphis, US | (India) Vijay Amritraj; 6–2, 0–6, 6–0 | (United States) Stan Smith | (United States) Bob Lutz (Sweden) Björn Borg | (South Africa) Cliff Drysdale (Australia) John Newcombe (United States) Roscoe Tanner (United States) Marty Riessen |
| 8 Mar | U.S. Indoor National Championships; Memphis, US | (India) Vijay Amritraj (India) Anand Amritraj; 6–3, 6–4 | (United States) Marty Riessen (United States) Roscoe Tanner | (United States) Bob Lutz (Sweden) Björn Borg | (South Africa) Cliff Drysdale (Australia) John Newcombe (United States) Roscoe Tanner (United States) Marty Riessen |
| 8 Mar | Mexico City WCT; Mexico City, Mexico; Carpet (i) – $60,000 – 16S/8D | (Mexico) Raúl Ramírez; 7–6, 6–2 | (United States) Eddie Dibbs | (Argentina) Guillermo Vilas (Mexico) Marcelo Lara | (United States) Brian Gottfried (Australia) Ken Rosewall (United States) Tom Gorman (Australia) Syd Ball |
| 8 Mar | Mexico City WCT; Mexico City, Mexico; Carpet (i) – $60,000 – 16S/8D | (United States) Brian Gottfried (Mexico) Raúl Ramírez; 6–4, 7–6^{(7–4)} | (Egypt) Ismail El Shafei (Australia) Brian Fairlie | (Argentina) Guillermo Vilas (Mexico) Marcelo Lara | (United States) Brian Gottfried (Australia) Ken Rosewall (United States) Tom Gorman (Australia) Syd Ball |
| 15 Mar | Washington Indoor; Washington, US; Carpet (i) – $60,000 – 16S/8D | (United States) Harold Solomon; 6–3, 6–1 | (New Zealand) Onny Parun | (Australia) John Newcombe (United States) Charlie Pasarell | (United States) Eddie Dibbs (South Africa) Ray Moore (United Kingdom) Mark Cox (Australia) Allan Stone |
| 15 Mar | Washington Indoor; Washington, US; Carpet (i) – $60,000 – 16S/8D | (United States) Eddie Dibbs (United States) Harold Solomon; 6–4, 7–5 | (United Kingdom) Mark Cox (South Africa) Cliff Drysdale | (Australia) John Newcombe (United States) Charlie Pasarell | (United States) Eddie Dibbs (South Africa) Ray Moore (United Kingdom) Mark Cox (Australia) Allan Stone |
| 15 Mar | Tennis South Invitational; Jackson, US; Carpet (i) – $60,000 – 16S/8D | (Australia) Ken Rosewall; 6–3, 6–3 | (Mexico) Raúl Ramírez | (India) Vijay Amritraj (Australia) Ross Case | (United States) Tom Gorman (United States) Dick Stockton (United States) Billy Martin (Australia) Phil Dent |
| 15 Mar | Tennis South Invitational; Jackson, US; Carpet (i) – $60,000 – 16S/8D | (United States) Brian Gottfried (Mexico) Raúl Ramírez; 7–5, 4–6, 6–0 | (Australia) Ross Case (Australia) Geoff Masters | (India) Vijay Amritraj (Australia) Ross Case | (United States) Tom Gorman (United States) Dick Stockton (United States) Billy Martin (Australia) Phil Dent |
| 29 Mar | Caracas WCT; Caracas, Venezuela | (Mexico) Raúl Ramírez; 6–3, 6–4 | (Romania) Ilie Năstase | (United States) Arthur Ashe (United States) Jeff Borowiak | (South Africa) Ray Moore (United States) Dick Stockton (United States) Brian Gottfried (United States) Erik van Dillen |
| 29 Mar | Caracas WCT; Caracas, Venezuela | (United States) Brian Gottfried (Mexico) Raúl Ramírez; 7–5, 6–4 | (United States) Jeff Borowiak (Romania) Ilie Năstase | (United States) Arthur Ashe (United States) Jeff Borowiak | (South Africa) Ray Moore (United States) Dick Stockton (United States) Brian Gottfried (United States) Erik van Dillen |
| 29 Mar | São Paulo WCT; São Paulo, Brasil; Carpet (i) – $60,000 | (Sweden) Björn Borg; 7–6^{(7–4)}, 6–2 | (Argentina) Guillermo Vilas | (Zimbabwe) Andrew Pattison (Brazil) Thomaz Koch | (Chile) Jaime Fillol (Australia) Phil Dent (Australia) Ross Case (Australia) Geoff Masters |
| 29 Mar | São Paulo WCT; São Paulo, Brasil; Carpet (i) – $60,000 | (Australia) Ross Case (Australia) Geoff Masters; 7–5, 6–1 | (United States) Charlie Pasarell (Australia) Allan Stone | (Zimbabwe) Andrew Pattison (Brazil) Thomaz Koch | (Chile) Jaime Fillol (Australia) Phil Dent (Australia) Ross Case (Australia) Geoff Masters |

=== April ===
| Week | Tournament | Champions | Runners-up | Semifinalists | Quarterfinalists |
|---|---|---|---|---|---|
| 5 Apr | Johannesburg Indoor; Johannesburg, South Africa | (New Zealand) Onny Parun; 7–6, 6–3 | (South Africa) Cliff Drysdale | (Australia) Ross Case (Netherlands) Tom Okker | (Argentina) Guillermo Vilas (Australia) Kim Warwick (Australia) Geoff Masters (South Africa) Ray Moore |
| 5 Apr | Johannesburg Indoor; Johannesburg, South Africa | (United States) Marty Riessen (United States) Roscoe Tanner; 6–2, 7–5 | (South Africa) Frew McMillan (Netherlands) Tom Okker | (Australia) Ross Case (Netherlands) Tom Okker | (Argentina) Guillermo Vilas (Australia) Kim Warwick (Australia) Geoff Masters (South Africa) Ray Moore |
| 5 Apr | Houston Open; Houston, US | (United States) Harold Solomon; 6–4, 1–6, 6–1 | (Australia) Ken Rosewall | (United States) Eddie Dibbs (United States) Vitas Gerulaitis | (United States) Bob Lutz (Australia) Phil Dent (Romania) Ilie Năstase (Australia) John Alexander |
| 5 Apr | Houston Open; Houston, US | (Australia) Rod Laver (Australia) Ken Rosewall; 6–4, 6–2 | (United States) Charlie Pasarell (Australia) Allan Stone | (United States) Eddie Dibbs (United States) Vitas Gerulaitis | (United States) Bob Lutz (Australia) Phil Dent (Romania) Ilie Năstase (Australia) John Alexander |
| 12 Apr | Monte Carlo Open; Monte Carlo, Monaco; Clay – $60,000 – 16S/8D | (Argentina) Guillermo Vilas; 6–1, 6–1, 6–4 | (Poland) Wojciech Fibak | (France) François Jauffret (West Germany) Karl Meiler | (South Africa) Ray Moore (Italy) Adriano Panatta (Soviet Union) Alex Metreveli (Sweden) Björn Borg |
| 12 Apr | Monte Carlo Open; Monte Carlo, Monaco; Clay – $60,000 – 16S/8D | (Poland) Wojciech Fibak (West Germany) Karl Meiler; 7–6, 6–1 | (Sweden) Björn Borg (Argentina) Guillermo Vilas | (France) François Jauffret (West Germany) Karl Meiler | (South Africa) Ray Moore (Italy) Adriano Panatta (Soviet Union) Alex Metreveli (Sweden) Björn Borg |
| 13 Apr | Charlotte Tennis Classic; Charlotte, US; Clay – $60,000 – 16S/8D | (Australia) Tony Roche; 6–3, 3–6, 6–1 | (United States) Vitas Gerulaitis | (United States) Eddie Dibbs (Australia) Ken Rosewall | (United States) Cliff Richey (Australia) Ross Case (United States) Dick Stockton (Australia) Geoff Masters |
| 13 Apr | Charlotte Tennis Classic; Charlotte, US; Clay – $60,000 – 16S/8D | (Australia) John Newcombe (Australia) Tony Roche; 6–3, 7–5 | (United States) Vitas Gerulaitis (United States) Gene Mayer | (United States) Eddie Dibbs (Australia) Ken Rosewall | (United States) Cliff Richey (Australia) Ross Case (United States) Dick Stockton (Australia) Geoff Masters |
| 19 Apr | United Bank Tennis Classic; Denver, US; Carpet (i) – $60,000 – 16S/8D | (United States) Jimmy Connors; 7–6, 6–2 | (Australia) Ross Case | (United States) Brian Gottfried (Mexico) Raúl Ramírez | (United States) Billy Martin (Australia) Geoff Masters (United States) Charlie Pasarell (Australia) John Alexander |
| 19 Apr | United Bank Tennis Classic; Denver, US; Carpet (i) – $60,000 – 16S/8D | (Australia) John Alexander (Australia) Phil Dent; 6–7, 6–2, 7–5 | (United States) Jimmy Connors (United States) Billy Martin | (United States) Brian Gottfried (Mexico) Raúl Ramírez | (United States) Billy Martin (Australia) Geoff Masters (United States) Charlie Pasarell (Australia) John Alexander |
| 19 Apr | Stockholm WCT; Stockholm, Sweden | (Poland) Wojciech Fibak; 6–4, 7–6 | (Romania) Ilie Năstase | (Italy) Adriano Panatta (Netherlands) Tom Okker | (Sweden) Björn Borg (Australia) Mark Edmondson (Soviet Union) Alex Metreveli (Argentina) Guillermo Vilas |
| 19 Apr | Stockholm WCT; Stockholm, Sweden | (Soviet Union) Alexander Metreveli (Romania) Ilie Năstase; 6–4, 7–5 | (Netherlands) Tom Okker (Italy) Adriano Panatta | (Italy) Adriano Panatta (Netherlands) Tom Okker | (Sweden) Björn Borg (Australia) Mark Edmondson (Soviet Union) Alex Metreveli (Argentina) Guillermo Vilas |
| 28 Apr | Masters Doubles WCT; Kansas City, US | (Poland) Wojciech Fibak (West Germany) Karl Meiler; 6–2, 2–6, 3–6, 6–3, 6–4 | (United States) Bob Lutz (United States) Stan Smith | | |

=== May ===
| Week | Tournament | Champions | Runners-up | Semifinalists | Quarterfinalists |
|---|---|---|---|---|---|
| 4 May | WCT Finals; Dallas, United States; Tour Finals; Carpet (i) – $100,000 – 8S; Singles | (Sweden) Björn Borg; 1–6, 6–1, 7–5, 6–1 | (Argentina) Guillermo Vilas | (United States) Harold Solomon (United States) Dick Stockton | (United States) Eddie Dibbs (United States) Robert Lutz (United States) Arthur Ashe (Mexico) Raúl Ramírez |

== Standings ==
| Player | Tournaments Played | Tournaments Won | Matches Won | Matches Lost | Points | Prize Money |
|---|---|---|---|---|---|---|
| (United States) Arthur Ashe ^{*} | 8 | 5 | 26 | 3 | 860 | $253,013 |
| (Mexico) Raúl Ramírez ^{*} | 8 | 2 | 18 | 6 | 705 | $104,700 |
| (Argentina) Guillermo Vilas ^{*} | 7 | 3 | 19 | 4 | 695 | $99,163 |
| (United States) Eddie Dibbs ^{*} | 8 | 2 | 19 | 6 | 675 | $79,538 |
| (Sweden) Björn Borg ^{*} | 8 | 2 | 17 | 6 | 650 | $135,838 |
| (United States) Dick Stockton ^{*} | 8 | 1 | 17 | 5 | 595 | $62,475 |
| (United States) Bob Lutz ^{*} | 8 | 0 | 15 | 9 | 585 | $69,013 |
| (United States) Harold Solomon ^{*} | 8 | 2 | 16 | 7 | 565 | $75,038 |
| (United States) Vitas Gerulaitis | 8 | 0 | 12 | 10 | 540 | $40,900 |
| (United States) Brian Gottfried | 8 | 0 | 14 | 8 | 535 | $54,600 |

^{*} Qualified for the WCT Finals.

== See also ==
- 1976 Grand Prix circuit
