= 1975 Richmond WCT – Singles =

Tennis tournament event

Singles
- 1975 Richmond WCT

Final
- Champion: (Sweden) Björn Borg
- Runner-up: (United States) Arthur Ashe
- Score: 4–6, 6–4, 6–4

Details
- Draw: 32
- Seeds: 8

Events
Singles	Doubles
← 1974 ·	Richmond WCT	· 1976 →

The 1975 Richmond WCT – Singles was an event of the 1975 Richmond WCT men's tennis tournament that was played at the Richmond Coliseum in Richmond, Virginia in the United States from January 27 through February 2, 1975. The draw comprised 32 players and 8 of them were seeded. The draw had to be redone after substitute players Jeff Borowiak and Tony Roche had been seeded in violation of WCT rules which stated that substitute players could not be seeded. Ilie Năstase was the defending champion, but did not compete in this edition. First-seeded Björn Borg won the singles title, defeating third-seeded Arthur Ashe in the final, 4–6, 6–4, 6–4.

== Seeds ==
1. (Sweden) Björn Borg (Champion)
2. (Netherlands) Tom Okker (Semifinals)
3. (United States) Arthur Ashe (Final)
4. (New Zealand) Onny Parun (Quarterfinals)
5. (Italy) Adriano Panatta (Quarterfinals)
6. (West Germany) Hans-Jürgen Pohmann (First round)
7. (South Africa) Frew McMillan (First round)
8. (Australia) Kim Warwick (Semifinals)

== Draw ==
=== Key ===
- Q = Qualifier
- WC = Wild card
- LL = Lucky loser
- Alt = Alternate
- SE = Special exempt
- PR = Protected ranking
- ITF = ITF entry
- JE = Junior exempt
- w/o = Walkover
- r = Retired
- d = Defaulted
- SR = Special ranking

=== Finals ===
Semifinals
2	(Netherlands) Tom Okker	4	4
3	(United States) Arthur Ashe	6	6
8	(Australia) Kim Warwick	3	2
1	(Sweden) Björn Borg	6	6

Final
3	(United States) Arthur Ashe	6	4	4
1	(Sweden) Björn Borg	4	6	6

=== Top half ===
First Round
2	(Netherlands) Tom Okker	6	6
(United States) Ferdi Taygan	2	4
(Sweden) Kjell Johansson	6	6
(United States) John Whitlinger	3	4
(France) Patrice Dominguez	7	7^{7}
(United States) Dick Dell	5	6^{4}
(Australia) Bob Giltinan	6	6^{6}	6
7	(South Africa) Frew McMillan	4	7^{8}	3
5	(Italy) Adriano Panatta	1	7	6
(United Kingdom) Buster Mottram	6	5	3
(South Africa) Bob Hewitt	6	6
(United States) Billy Martin	4	2
(United States) Fred McNair	6	1	6^{5}
(Socialist Federal Republic of Yugoslavia) Željko Franulović	3	6	7^{7}
(Italy) Corrado Barazzutti	2	3
3	(United States) Arthur Ashe	6	6

Second Round
2	(Netherlands) Tom Okker	6	6
(Sweden) Kjell Johansson	3	2
(France) Patrice Dominguez	3	3
(Australia) Bob Giltinan	6	6
5	(Italy) Adriano Panatta	6	4	6
(South Africa) Bob Hewitt	0	6	4
(Socialist Federal Republic of Yugoslavia) Željko Franulović	3	1
3	(United States) Arthur Ashe	6	6

Quarterfinals
2	(Netherlands) Tom Okker	6	7^{7}
(Australia) Bob Giltinan	1	6^{1}
5	(Italy) Adriano Panatta	7^{8}	2	2
3	(United States) Arthur Ashe	6^{6}	6	6

Semifinals
2	(Netherlands) Tom Okker	4	4
3	(United States) Arthur Ashe	6	6

=== Bottom half ===
First Round
4	(New Zealand) Onny Parun	6	1	6
(United States) Steve Krulevitz	4	6	2
(Italy) Paolo Bertolucci	6	2	6
(Australia) Dick Crealy	2	6	4
(Australia) Tony Roche
(United States) Bruce Manson	w/o
(United Kingdom) John Lloyd	3	3
8	(Australia) Kim Warwick	6	6
6	(West Germany) Hans-Jürgen Pohmann	6^{5}	2
(United States) Jeff Borowiak	7^{7}	6
(United States) Sherwood Stewart	3	6^{5}
(United States) Raz Reid	6	7^{7}
(Spain) José Higueras	6	6
(Australia) Syd Ball	2	1
(Austria) Hans Kary	0	1
1	(Sweden) Björn Borg	6	6

Second Round
4	(New Zealand) Onny Parun	7^{7}	6
(Italy) Paolo Bertolucci	6^{5}	3
(United States) Bruce Manson	4	6	4
8	(Australia) Kim Warwick	6	4	6
(United States) Jeff Borowiak	6	6
(United States) Raz Reid	1	2
(Spain) José Higueras	4	6	0
1	(Sweden) Björn Borg	6	2	6

Quarterfinals
4	(New Zealand) Onny Parun	4	6^{3}
8	(Australia) Kim Warwick	6	7^{7}
(United States) Jeff Borowiak	5	7	1
1	(Sweden) Björn Borg	7	5	6

Semifinals
8	(Australia) Kim Warwick	3	2
1	(Sweden) Björn Borg	6	6
