= 1976 Mexico City WCT =

Tennis tournament

- Date: 9–14 March
- Edition: 1st
- Category: World Championship Tennis
- Draw: 16S / 8D
- Prize money: $60,000
- Surface: Carpet (indoors)
- Location: Mexico City, Mexico

Champions

Singles
- (Mexico) Raúl Ramírez

Doubles
- (United States) Brian Gottfried / (Mexico) Raúl Ramírez
Mexico City WCT	· 1977 →

The 1976 Mexico City WCT was a men's tennis tournament played on indoor carpet courts in Mexico City, Mexico. The event was part of the 1976 World Championship Tennis circuit. It was the inaugural edition of the tournament and was held from 9 March until 14 March 1976. Fourth-seeded Raúl Ramírez won the singles title.

== Finals ==
=== Singles ===
(Mexico) Raúl Ramírez defeated (United States) Eddie Dibbs, 7–6, 6–2

- It was Ramírez' 1st singles title of the year and the 8th of his career.

=== Doubles ===
(United States) Brian Gottfried / (Mexico) Raúl Ramírez defeated (Egypt) Ismail El Shafei / (New Zealand) Brian Fairlie, 6–4, 7–6^{(7–4)}

== See also ==
- 1976 Monterrey WCT
