= 1975 Richmond WCT – Doubles =

Tennis tournament event

Doubles
- 1975 Richmond WCT

Final
- Champion: (Austria) Hans Kary (United States) Fred McNair
- Runner-up: (Italy) Paolo Bertolucci (Italy) Adriano Panatta
- Score: 7–6^{(8–6)}, 5–7, 7–6^{(8–6)}

Details
- Draw: 16
- Seeds: 4

Events
Singles	Doubles
← 1974 ·	Richmond WCT	· 1976 →

The 1975 Richmond WCT – Doubles was an event of the 1975 Richmond WCT men's tennis tournament that was played at the Richmond Coliseum in Richmond, Virginia in the United States from January 27 through February 2, 1975. The draw comprised 16 teams and 4 of them were seeded. Nikola Pilić and Allan Stone were the defending doubles champions, but did not compete in this edition. Unseeded Hans Kary and Fred McNair won the doubles title, defeating third-seeded Paolo Bertolucci and Adriano Panatta in the final, 7–6^{(8–6)}, 5–7, 7–6^{(8–6)}.

== Seeds ==
1. (South Africa) Bob Hewitt / (South Africa) Frew McMillan (Semifinals)
2. (United States) Arthur Ashe / (Netherlands) Tom Okker (First round)
3. (Italy) Paolo Bertolucci / (Italy) Adriano Panatta (Final)
4. (Australia) Dick Crealy / (New Zealand) Onny Parun (First round)

== Draw ==
=== Key ===
- Q = Qualifier
- WC = Wild card
- LL = Lucky loser
- Alt = Alternate
- SE = Special exempt
- PR = Protected ranking
- ITF = ITF entry
- JE = Junior exempt
- w/o = Walkover
- r = Retired
- d = Defaulted
- SR = Special ranking

First Round
1	(South Africa) Bob Hewitt (South Africa) Frew McMillan	6	6
(United States) Billy Martin (United States) Ferdi Taygan	2	3
(United Kingdom) Buster Mottram (West Germany) Hans-Jürgen Pohmann	6	6
(Australia) Syd Ball (Australia) Bob Giltinan	4	2
(United States) Bruce Manson (United States) John Whitlinger	5	6^{4}
(United States) Steve Krulevitz (United Kingdom) John Lloyd	7	7^{7}
(United States) Jeff Borowiak (Australia) Tony Roche
3	(Italy) Paolo Bertolucci (Italy) Adriano Panatta	w/o
4	(Australia) Dick Crealy (New Zealand) Onny Parun	3	3
(Austria) Hans Kary (United States) Fred McNair	6	6
(Sweden) Björn Borg (Sweden) Kjell Johansson	2	6	6^{6}
(Socialist Federal Republic of Yugoslavia) Željko Franulović (United States) Raz Reid	6	2	7^{8}
(United States) Dick Dell (United States) Sherwood Stewart	6	6
(Italy) Corrado Barazzutti (Spain) José Higueras	2	4
(France) Patrice Dominguez (Australia) Kim Warwick	7^{7}	6^{5}	6
2	(United States) Arthur Ashe (Netherlands) Tom Okker	6^{5}	7^{7}	2

Quarterfinals
1	(South Africa) Bob Hewitt (South Africa) Frew McMillan	7^{7}	6
(United Kingdom) Buster Mottram (West Germany) Hans-Jürgen Pohmann	6^{3}	2
(United States) Steve Krulevitz (United Kingdom) John Lloyd	3	6	3
3	(Italy) Paolo Bertolucci (Italy) Adriano Panatta	6	3	6
(Austria) Hans Kary (United States) Fred McNair	7	6
(Socialist Federal Republic of Yugoslavia) Željko Franulović (United States) Raz Reid	5	3
(United States) Dick Dell (United States) Sherwood Stewart	6	5	2
(France) Patrice Dominguez (Australia) Kim Warwick	4	7	6

Semifinals
1	(South Africa) Bob Hewitt (South Africa) Frew McMillan	5	7	1
3	(Italy) Paolo Bertolucci (Italy) Adriano Panatta	7	5	6
(Austria) Hans Kary (United States) Fred McNair	6	6
(France) Patrice Dominguez (Australia) Kim Warwick	2	2

Final
3	(Italy) Paolo Bertolucci (Italy) Adriano Panatta	6^{6}	7	6^{6}
(Austria) Hans Kary (United States) Fred McNair	7^{8}	5	7^{8}
