= 1975 Richmond WCT =

- Date: January 27 – February 2
- Edition: 10th
- Category: World Championship Tennis (WCT)
- Draw: 32S / 16D
- Prize money: $60,000
- Surface: Carpet / indoor
- Location: Richmond, U.S.
- Venue: Richmond Coliseum

Champions

Singles
- (Sweden) Björn Borg

Doubles
- (United States) Fred McNair / (Austria) Hans Kary
← 1974 ·	Richmond WCT	· 1976 →

The 1975 Richmond WCT, also known as the Fidelity Tournament for sponsorship reasons, was a men's professional tennis tournament. It was held on indoor carpet courts at the Richmond Coliseum in Richmond, Virginia in the United States. It was the tenth edition of the tournament and was held from January 27 through February 2, 1975. The tournament was part of the Green Group of the 1975 World Championship Tennis circuit. First-seeded Björn Borg won the singles title and the accompanying $12,000 first prize.

== Finals ==
=== Singles ===
(Sweden) Björn Borg defeated (United States) Arthur Ashe 4–6, 6–4, 6–4

- It was Borg's 1st singles title of the year and the 9th of his career.

=== Doubles ===
(United States) Fred McNair / (Austria) Hans Kary defeated (Italy) Paolo Bertolucci / (Italy) Adriano Panatta 7–6^{(8–6)}, 5–7, 7–6^{(8–6)}
