= 1975 Rothmans International Trophy =

- Date: 4–8 March
- Edition: 5th
- Category: WCT
- Draw: 16S / 8D
- Prize money: $60,000
- Surface: Carpet / indoors
- Location: London, England
- Venue: Royal Albert Hall

Champions

Singles
- (United Kingdom) Mark Cox

Doubles
- (Italy) Paolo Bertolucci (Italy) Adriano Panatta
← 1974 ·	Rothmans International Tennis Tournament	· 1977 →

The 1975 Rothmans International Trophy was a men's professional tennis tournament held on indoor carpet courts at the Royal Albert Hall in London, England. It was the fifth edition of the event and was held from 4 March until 8 March 1975. The tournament was a special non–ranking event on the 1975 World Championship Tennis circuit consisting of eight nations and 16 players. Mark Cox won the singles title.

== Finals ==
=== Singles ===
(United Kingdom) Mark Cox defeated (New Zealand) Brian Fairlie 6–1, 7–5

=== Doubles ===
(Italy) Paolo Bertolucci / (Italy) Adriano Panatta defeated (West Germany) Jürgen Fassbender / (West Germany) Hans-Jürgen Pohmann 6–3, 6–4

== Country standings ==
Rank	Country	Points
1,	Great Britain	58
2.	New Zealand	36
3.	Czechoslovakia	35
4.	Italy	32
5.	West Germany	22
6.	Yugoslavia	18
7.	South Africa	14
8.	Sweden	10
