= 1977 ABN World Tennis Tournament =

- Date: 21–27 March
- Edition: 5th
- Category: WCT
- Draw: 16S / 8D
- Prize money: $100,000
- Surface: Carpet / indoor
- Location: Rotterdam, Netherlands
- Venue: Rotterdam Ahoy

Champions

Singles
- (United States) Dick Stockton

Doubles
- (Netherlands) Tom Okker / (Poland) Wojciech Fibak
- ABN World Tennis Tournament

The 1977 ABN World Tennis Tournament was a men's tennis tournament played on indoor carpet courts at Rotterdam Ahoy in the Netherlands. The event was part of the 1977 World Championship Tennis circuit. It was the fifth edition of the tournament and was held from 21 March through 27 March 1977. First-seeded Dick Stockton won the singles title.

== Finals ==
=== Singles ===
(United States) Dick Stockton defeated (Romania) Ilie Năstase 2–6, 6–3, 6–3

- It was Stockton's 3rd singles title of the year and the 7th of his career.

=== Doubles ===
(Netherlands) Tom Okker / (Poland) Wojciech Fibak defeated (India) Vijay Amritraj / (United States) Dick Stockton 6–4, 6–4
