= 1977 Mexico City WCT =

- Date: 8–13 February
- Edition: 2nd
- Category: World Championship Tennis
- Draw: 16S / 8D
- Prize money: $100,000
- Surface: Carpet (indoors)
- Location: Mexico City, Mexico

Champions

Singles
- (Romania) Ilie Năstase

Doubles
- (Poland) Wojciech Fibak / (Netherlands) Tom Okker
- Mexico City WCT

The 1977 Mexico City WCT was a men's tennis tournament played on indoor carpet courts in Mexico City, Mexico. The event was part of the 1977 World Championship Tennis circuit. It was the second edition of the tournament and was held from 8 March until 13 February 1977. Unseeded Ilie Năstase won the singles title.

== Finals ==
=== Singles ===
(Romania) Ilie Năstase defeated (Poland) Wojciech Fibak, 4–6, 6–2, 7–6

- It was Năstase' 1st singles title of the year and the 55th of his career.

=== Doubles ===
(Poland) Wojciech Fibak / (Netherlands) Tom Okker defeated (Romania) Ilie Năstase / (Italy) Adriano Panatta, 6–2, 6–3

== See also ==
- 1977 Monterrey WCT
