= 1976 ABN World Tennis Tournament – Singles =

Singles
- 1976 ABN World Tennis Tournament

Final
- Champion: (United States) Arthur Ashe
- Runner-up: (United States) Bob Lutz
- Score: 6–3, 6–3

Details
- Draw: 16
- Seeds: 4

Events
Singles	Doubles
← 1975 ·	ABN World Tennis Tournament	· 1977 →

Arthur Ashe was the reigning champion of the singles event at the ABN World Tennis Tournament and, seeded first, successfully defended his title after a victory in the final against unseeded Bob Lutz 6–3, 6–3.

== Seeds ==
1. (United States) Arthur Ashe (champion)
2. (Netherlands) Tom Okker (semifinals)
3. (Australia) Rod Laver (semifinals)
4. (Czechoslovakia) Jan Kodeš (second round)

== Draw ==
First round
2	(Netherlands) Tom Okker	7	6
(South Africa) Frew McMillan	5	2
(West Germany) Karl Meiler	2	7	5
(Poland) Wojtek Fibak	6	5	7
(United States) Bob Lutz	6	2	6
(Australia) Dick Crealy	0	6	3
(Netherlands) Wouter Fok	0	2
4	(Czechoslovakia) Jan Kodeš	6	6
3	(Australia) Rod Laver	6	6
(Netherlands) Rolf Thung	1	2
(Netherlands) Louk Sanders	4	4
(Czechoslovakia) Jiří Hřebec	6	6
(United States) Jeff Borowiak	0	r
(United States) Stan Smith	5
(Soviet Union) Alex Metreveli
1	(United States) Arthur Ashe

Second round
2	(Netherlands) Tom Okker	6	6
(Poland) Wojtek Fibak	1	4
(United States) Robert Lutz	6	6
4	(Czechoslovakia) Jan Kodeš	2	3
3	(Australia) Rod Laver	6	6
(Czechoslovakia) Jiří Hřebec	4	3
(United States) Stan Smith	4	2
1	(United States) Arthur Ashe	6	6

Semifinals
2	(Netherlands) Tom Okker	4	6	4
(United States) Bob Lutz	6	4	6
3	(Australia) Rod Laver	7	5	3
1	(United States) Arthur Ashe	5	7	6

Final
(United States) Bob Lutz	3	3
1	(United States) Arthur Ashe	6	6
