= 1973 Rothmans International Tennis Tournament =

- Date: 18-27 January
- Edition: 3rd
- Category: WCT
- Draw: 32S/16D
- Prize money: $50,000
- Surface: Carpet / Indoor
- Location: Deeside, England; London, England
- Venue: Royal Albert Hall

Champions

Singles
- (United States) Brian Fairlie

Doubles
- (Netherlands) Tom Okker / (United States) Marty Riessen
← 1972 ·	Rothmans International Tennis Tournament	· 1974 →

The 1973 Rothmans International Tennis Tournament was a men's professional tennis tournament held on indoor carpet courts in the Royal Albert Hall in London, England. It was the third edition of the tournament and was held from 18 to 27 January 1973. The event was part of the 1973 World Championship Tennis circuit. Brian Fairlie won the singles title.

== Finals ==
=== Singles ===
(New Zealand) Brian Fairlie defeated (United Kingdom) Mark Cox 2–6, 6–2, 6–2, 7–6

=== Doubles ===
(Netherlands) Tom Okker / (United States) Marty Riessen defeated (United States) Arthur Ashe / (United States) Roscoe Tanner 6–3, 6–3
