= 1976 ABN World Tennis Tournament =

- Date: 23–29 February
- Edition: 4th
- Category: World Championship Tennis
- Draw: 16S / 8D
- Prize money: $60,000
- Surface: Carpet (indoors)
- Location: Rotterdam, Netherlands
- Venue: Rotterdam Ahoy

Champions

Singles
- (United States) Arthur Ashe

Doubles
- (Australia) Rod Laver / (South Africa) Frew McMillan
- ABN World Tennis Tournament

The 1976 ABN World Tennis Tournament was a men's tennis tournament played on indoor carpet courts at Rotterdam Ahoy in the Netherlands. It was part of the 1976 World Championship Tennis circuit. It was the fourth edition of the tournament was held from 23 February through 29 February 1976. Arthur Ashe won the singles title.

== Finals ==
=== Singles ===
(United States) Arthur Ashe defeated (United States) Bob Lutz 6–3, 6–3

=== Doubles ===
(Australia) Rod Laver / (South Africa) Frew McMillan defeated (United States) Arthur Ashe / (Netherlands) Tom Okker 6–1, 6–7^{(4–7)}, 7–5^{(7–5)}

== Draws ==
=== Singles ===
First round
2	(Netherlands) Tom Okker	7	6
(South Africa) Frew McMillan	5	2
(West Germany) Karl Meiler	2	7	5
(Poland) Wojciech Fibak	6	5	7
(United States) Bob Lutz	6	2	6
(Australia) Dick Crealy	0	6	3
(Netherlands) Wouter Fok	0	2
4	(Czechoslovakia) Jan Kodeš	6	6
3	(Australia) Rod Laver	6	6
(Netherlands) Rolf Thung	1	2
(Netherlands) Louk Sanders	4	4
(Czechoslovakia) Jiří Hřebec	6	6
(United States) Jeff Borowiak	0	r
(United States) Stan Smith	5
(Soviet Union) Alex Metreveli
1	(United States) Arthur Ashe

Second round
2	(Netherlands) Tom Okker	6	6
(Poland) Wojciech Fibak	1	4
(United States) Robert Lutz	6	6
4	(Czechoslovakia) Jan Kodeš	2	3
3	(Australia) Rod Laver	6	6
(Czechoslovakia) Jiří Hřebec	4	3
(United States) Stan Smith	4	2
1	(United States) Arthur Ashe	6	6

Semifinals
2	(Netherlands) Tom Okker	4	6	4
(United States) Bob Lutz	6	4	6
3	(Australia) Rod Laver	7	5	3
1	(United States) Arthur Ashe	5	7	6

Final
(United States) Bob Lutz	3	3
1	(United States) Arthur Ashe	6	6
