= 1976 São Paulo WCT =

- Date: 29 March – 4 April
- Edition: 3rd
- Category: World Championship Tennis (WCT)
- Draw: 32S / 16D
- Prize money: $60,000
- Surface: Carpet / indoor
- Location: São Paulo, Brazil

Champions

Singles
- (Sweden) Björn Borg

Doubles
- (Australia) Ross Case / (Australia) Geoff Masters
- São Paulo WCT

The 1976 São Paulo WCT was a men's tennis tournament played on indoor carpet courts in São Paulo, Brazil. The tournament was part of Blue Group of the 1976 World Championship Tennis circuit. It was the third and last edition of the event and was held from 29 March through 4 April 1976. Second-seeded Björn Borg won the singles title and earned $17,000 first-prize money.

== Finals ==
=== Singles ===
(Sweden) Björn Borg defeated (Argentina) Guillermo Vilas 7–6^{(7–4)}, 6–2

- It was Borg's 2nd singles title of the year and the 15th of his career.

=== Doubles ===
(Australia) Ross Case / (Australia) Geoff Masters defeated (United States) Charlie Pasarell / (Australia) Allan Stone 7–5, 6–1

- It was Case's 1st doubles title of the year and the 12th of his career. It was Masters' 1st doubles title of the year and the 11th of his career.
