= 1978 Richmond WCT =

- Date: January 30 – February 5
- Edition: 13th
- Category: Grand Prix (WCT)
- Draw: 32S / 16D
- Prize money: $175,000
- Surface: Carpet / Indoor
- Location: Richmond, Virginia, U.S.

Champions

Singles
- (United States) Vitas Gerulaitis

Doubles
- (South Africa) Bob Hewitt / (South Africa) Frew McMillan
- Richmond WCT

The 1978 Richmond WCT, also known by its sponsored name United Virginia Bank Classic, was a men's tennis tournament played on indoor carpet courts in Richmond, Virginia, United States. The event was part WCT Tour which was incorporated into the 1978 Colgate-Palmolive Grand Prix circuit. It was the 13th edition of the tournament and was held from January 30 through February 5, 1978. Second-seeded Vitas Gerulaitis won the singles title.

== Finals ==
=== Singles ===
(United States) Vitas Gerulaitis defeated (Australia) John Newcombe 6–3, 6–4

- It was Gerulaitis' 1st singles title of the year and the 9th of his career.

=== Doubles ===
(South Africa) Bob Hewitt / (South Africa) Frew McMillan defeated (United States) Vitas Gerulaitis / (United States) Sandy Mayer 6–3, 7–5
