= 1976 United Virginia Bank Classic =

- Date: February 4–8
- Edition: 11th
- Category: World Championship Tennis (WCT)
- Draw: 16S / 8D
- Prize money: $60,000
- Surface: Carpet / indoor
- Location: Richmond, Virginia, U.S.
- Venue: Richmond Coliseum

Champions

Singles
- (United States) Arthur Ashe

Doubles
- (United States) Brian Gottfried / (Mexico) Raúl Ramírez
- Richmond WCT

The 1976 United Virginia Bank Classic, also known as the Richmond WCT, was a men's tennis tournament played on indoor carpet courts at the Richmond Coliseum in Richmond, Virginia in the United States. The event was part 1976 World Championship Tennis circuit. It was the 11th edition of the tournament and was held from February 4 through February 8, 1976. First-seeded Arthur Ashe won the singles title and earned $17,000 first-prize money as well as 125 ranking points.

== Finals ==
=== Singles ===
(United States) Arthur Ashe defeated (United States) Brian Gottfried 6–2, 6–4

=== Doubles ===
(United States) Brian Gottfried / (Mexico) Raúl Ramírez defeated (United States) Arthur Ashe / (Netherlands) Tom Okker 6–4, 7–5
