= 1981 United Virginia Bank Classic =

- Date: February 2–8
- Edition: 16th
- Category: Grand Prix (WCT)
- Draw: 32S / 16D
- Prize money: $175,000
- Surface: Carpet / indoor
- Location: Richmond, Virginia, United States
- Venue: Richmond Coliseum

Champions

Singles
- (France) Yannick Noah

Doubles
- (United States) Tim Gullikson / (South Africa) Bernard Mitton
- Richmond WCT

The 1981 United Virginia Bank Classic, also known as the Richmond WCT, was a men's tennis tournament played on indoor carpet courts at the Richmond Coliseum in Richmond, Virginia, United States. The event was part WCT Tour which was incorporated into the 1981 Volvo Grand Prix circuit. It was the 16th edition of the tournament and was held from February 2 through February 8, 1981. Eighth-seeded Yannick Noah won the singles title and $35,000 first-prize money after his opponent in the final Ivan Lendl retired with a pulled leg muscle.

== Finals ==
=== Singles ===
(France) Yannick Noah defeated (Czechoslovakia) Ivan Lendl 6–1, 3–1, retired

- It was Noah's 1st singles title of the year and the 6th of his career.

=== Doubles ===
(United States) Tim Gullikson / (South Africa) Bernard Mitton defeated (United States) Brian Gottfried / (Mexico) Raúl Ramírez 3–6, 6–2, 6–3
