= 1974 Rothmans International Tennis Tournament =

- Date: 15–23 February
- Edition: 4th
- Category: WCT
- Draw: 32S / 16D
- Prize money: $50,000
- Surface: Carpet / indoors
- Location: Deeside, Wales; London, England
- Venue: Royal Albert Hall

Champions

Singles
- (Sweden) Björn Borg

Doubles
- (Sweden) Björn Borg / (Sweden) Ove Bengtson
← 1973 ·	Rothmans International Tennis Tournament	· 1975 →

The 1974 Rothmans International Tennis Tournament was a men's professional tennis tournament held on indoor carpet courts in the Royal Albert Hall in London, England. It was the fourth edition of the tournament and was held from 15 to 23 February 1974. The event was part of the 1974 World Championship Tennis circuit. Sixth-seeded Björn Borg won the singles title.

== Finals ==
=== Singles ===
(Sweden) Björn Borg defeated (United Kingdom) Mark Cox 6–7^{(4–7)}, 7–6^{(8–6),} 6–4

- It was Borg's second singles title of the year and of his career.

=== Doubles ===
(Sweden) Björn Borg / (Sweden) Ove Bengtson defeated (United Kingdom) Mark Farrell / (United Kingdom) John Lloyd 7–6, 6–3
