= 1976 Phoenix Cup =

- Date: January 14–19
- Edition: 5th
- Category: World Championship Tennis (WCT)
- Draw: 16S / 8D
- Prize money: $60,000
- Surface: Carpet / indoor
- Location: Atlanta, Georgia, US
- Venue: Omni Coliseum

Champions

Singles
- (Romania) Ilie Năstase

Doubles
- (Australia) John Alexander / (Australia) Phil Dent
- Atlanta WCT

The 1976 Phoenix Cup, also known as the Atlanta WCT, was a men's tennis tournament played on indoor carpet courts at the Omni Coliseum in Atlanta, Georgia in the United States that was part of the 1976 World Championship Tennis circuit. It was the fifth and last edition of the tournament and was held from January 14 through January 19, 1976. Second-seeded Ilie Năstase won the singles title and the accompanying $17,000 first-prize money.

== Finals ==
=== Singles ===
(Romania) Ilie Năstase defeated (United States) Jeff Borowiak 6–2, 6–4

- It was Năstase's 1st singles title of the year and the 54th of his career.

=== Doubles ===
(Australia) John Alexander / (Australia) Phil Dent defeated (Poland) Wojciech Fibak / (West Germany) Karl Meiler 6–3, 6–4
