= 1971 Rothmans International Tennis Tournament =

Tennis tournament

- Date: 28 February-4 March
- Edition: 2nd
- Category: Independent
- Prize money: $30,000 / £12,500 (Note: At the time it was the richest tennis tournament in Britain with the highest first-prize money.)
- Surface: Carpet / indoor
- Location: London, England
- Venue: Royal Albert Hall

Champions

Singles
- Rod Laver
← 1970 ·	Rothmans International Tennis Tournament	· 1972 →

The 1971 Rothmans International Tennis Tournament was a men's professional tennis tournament held on indoor carpet courts in the Royal Albert Hall in London, England. It was the second edition of the tournament and was held from 28 February through 4 March 1971. It was an independent event, i.e. not part of either the 1971 Grand Prix or 1971 World Championship Tennis circuit. Only a singles event was held which was won by Rod Laver who earned $7,800 / £3,250 first-prize money.

== Finals ==
=== Singles ===
(Australia) Rod Laver defeated (Socialist Federal Republic of Yugoslavia) Nikola Pilić 6–4, 6–0, 6–2
