= 1977 U.S. Pro Indoor – Doubles =

Doubles
- 1977 U.S. Pro Indoor

Final
- Champions: (South Africa) Bob Hewitt (South Africa) Frew McMillan
- Runners-up: (Poland) Wojtek Fibak (Netherlands) Tom Okker
- Score: 6–1, 1–6, 6–3

Events
Singles	Doubles
← 1976 ·	U.S. Pro Indoor	· 1978 →

Rod Laver and Dennis Ralston were the defending champions, but Ralston did not participate this year. Laver partnered Ken Rosewall, losing in the first round.

Bob Hewitt and Frew McMillan won the title, defeating Wojtek Fibak and Tom Okker 6–1, 1–6, 6–3 in the final.

== Seeds ==
1. (South Africa) Bob Hewitt / (South Africa) Frew McMillan (champions)
2. (United States) Fred McNair / (United States) Sherwood Stewart (quarterfinals)
3. N/A
4. (Poland) Wojtek Fibak / (Netherlands) Tom Okker (final)
5. N/A
6. (India) Vijay Amritraj / (United States) Dick Stockton (quarterfinals)
7. (Czechoslovakia) Jan Kodeš / (Spain) Manuel Orantes (second round)
8. (Romania) Ilie Năstase / (Italy) Adriano Panatta (second round)

== Draw ==
=== Key ===
- Q = Qualifier
- WC = Wild card
- LL = Lucky loser
- Alt = Alternate
- SE = Special exempt
- PR = Protected ranking
- ITF = ITF entry
- JE = Junior exempt
- w/o = Walkover
- r = Retired
- d = Defaulted
- SR = Special ranking

=== Finals ===
Semifinals
1	(South Africa) Bob Hewitt (South Africa) Frew McMillan	6	6
(United States) Tom Gorman (United States) Brian Gottfried	4	1
4	(Poland) Wojtek Fibak (Netherlands) Tom Okker	6	7
(Australia) Ross Case (Australia) Tony Roche	4	5

Final
1	(South Africa) Bob Hewitt (South Africa) Frew McMillan	6	1	6
4	(Poland) Wojtek Fibak (Netherlands) Tom Okker	1	6	3

=== Top half ===
First round
(Australia) R Laver (Australia) K Rosewall	4	1
(Sweden) B Borg (United States) V Gerulaitis	6	6
(United States) T Moor (United States) T Waltke	6	4	6
(Soviet Union) V Borisov (Pakistan) H Rahim	3	6	2
(United States) T Gorman (United States) B Gottfried	6	4	6
(South Africa) B Bertram (South Africa) B Mitton	3	6	3
6	(India) V Amritraj (United States) D Stockton	6	6
(United Kingdom) M Cox (South Africa) R Moore	3	4
(United States) J Delaney (Israel) S Krulevitz	1	3
(United States) G Mayer (United States) S Mayer	6	6

Second round
1	(South Africa) B Hewitt (South Africa) F McMillan	7	6
(Italy) C Barazzutti (New Zealand) O Parun	5	2
7	(Czechoslovakia) J Kodeš (Spain) M Orantes	6	5	3
(Sweden) B Borg (United States) V Gerulaitis	4	7	6
(United States) T Moor (United States) T Waltke	1	6	3
(United States) T Gorman (United States) B Gottfried	6	4	6
6	(India) V Amritraj (United States) D Stockton	6	6
(United States) G Mayer (United States) S Mayer	3	3

Quarterfinals
1	(South Africa) B Hewitt (South Africa) F McMillan	7^{7}	6
(Sweden) B Borg (United States) V Gerulaitis	6^{4}	4
(United States) T Gorman (United States) B Gottfried	6^{3}	7^{7}	6
6	(India) V Amritraj (United States) D Stockton	7^{7}	6^{3}	3

Semifinals
1	(South Africa) B Hewitt (South Africa) F McMillan	6	6
(United States) T Gorman (United States) B Gottfried	4	1

=== Bottom half ===
First round
(United Kingdom) B Mottram (United Kingdom) R Taylor	3	6	4
(Czechoslovakia) J Hřebec (Soviet Union) A Metreveli	6	2	6
(United States) B Martin (United States) B Scanlon	6	7^{7}
(United States) P DuPré (United States) C Pasarell	3	6^{0}
(United States) J Borowiak (United States) A Pattison	4	2
8	(Romania) I Năstase (Italy) A Panatta	6	6
(United States) E Dibbs (United States) H Solomon	0	2
4	(Poland) W Fibak (Netherlands) T Okker	6	6

Second round
(Czechoslovakia) J Hřebec (Soviet Union) A Metreveli	7^{8}	1	5
(United States) B Martin (United States) B Scanlon	6^{6}	6	7
8	(Romania) I Năstase (Italy) A Panatta	4	2
4	(Poland) W Fibak (Netherlands) T Okker	6	6
(Soviet Union) T Kakoulia (United States) B Walts	2	4
(Australia) R Case (Australia) T Roche	6	6
(Australia) J Alexander (Australia) P Dent	5	3
2	(United States) F McNair (United States) S Stewart	7	6

Quarterfinals
(United States) B Martin (United States) B Scanlon	7^{8}	1	0
4	(Poland) W Fibak (Netherlands) T Okker	6^{6}	6	6
(Australia) R Case (Australia) T Roche	1	7^{7}	6
2	(United States) F McNair (United States) S Stewart	6	6^{5}	3

Semifinals
4	(Poland) W Fibak (Netherlands) T Okker	6	7
(Australia) R Case (Australia) T Roche	4	5
