= 1977 Richmond Tennis Classic =

- Date: February 1–6
- Edition: 12th
- Category: World Championship Tennis (WCT)
- Draw: 16S / 8D
- Prize money: $100,000
- Surface: Carpet / indoor
- Location: Richmond, Virginia, U.S.
- Venue: Richmond Coliseum

Champions

Singles
- (Netherlands) Tom Okker

Doubles
- (Poland) Wojciech Fibak / (Netherlands) Tom Okker
- Richmond WCT

The 1977 Richmond Tennis Classic was a men's tennis tournament played on indoor carpet courts at the Richmond Coliseum in Richmond, Virginia in the United States. The event was part 1977 World Championship Tennis circuit. It was the 12th edition of the tournament and was held from February 1 through February 6, 1977. Unseeded Tom Okker won the singles title and earned $30,000 first-prize money.

== Finals ==
=== Singles ===
(Netherlands) Tom Okker defeated (United States) Vitas Gerulaitis 3–6, 6–3, 6–4

=== Doubles ===
(Poland) Wojciech Fibak / (Netherlands) Tom Okker defeated (Australia) Ross Case / (Australia) Tony Roche 6–4, 6–4
