= 1977 U.S. Pro Indoor =

- Date: January 24–30
- Edition: 10th
- Category: World Championship Tennis
- Draw: 64S / 32D
- Prize money: $200,000
- Surface: Carpet / indoor
- Location: Philadelphia, PA, United States
- Venue: Spectrum
- Attendance: 81,798

Champions

Singles
- (United States) Dick Stockton

Doubles
- (South Africa) Bob Hewitt / (South Africa) Frew McMillan
- U.S. Pro Indoor

The 1977 U.S. Pro Indoor was a men's tennis tournament played on indoor carpet courts that was part of the World Championship Tennis (WCT) circuit. It was played at the Spectrum in Philadelphia, Pennsylvania in the United States. It was the 10th edition of the tournament and was held from January 24 through January 30, 1977. Dick Stockton, who was seeded 12th, won the singles title while Bob Hewitt and Frew McMillan won the men's doubles. Total attendance for the tournament was 81,798.

== Finals ==
=== Singles ===
(United States) Dick Stockton defeated (United States) Jimmy Connors 3–6, 6–4, 3–6, 6–1, 6–2

- It was Stockton's 2nd singles title of the year and the 5th of his career.

=== Doubles ===
(South Africa) Bob Hewitt / (South Africa) Frew McMillan defeated (Poland) Wojciech Fibak / (Netherlands) Tom Okker 6–1, 1–6, 6–3

- It was Hewitt's 1st title for that year and the 31st of his career. It was McMillan's 1st title of the year and the 36th of his career.
