= 1976 U.S. Pro Indoor – Singles =

Singles
- 1976 U.S. Pro Indoor

Final
- Champion: (United States) Jimmy Connors
- Runner-up: (Sweden) Björn Borg
- Score: 7–6^{(7–5)}, 6–4, 6–0

Details
- Draw: 54
- Seeds: 16

Events
Singles	Doubles
← 1975 ·	U.S. Pro Indoor	· 1977 →

Marty Riessen was the defending champion, but lost in the final this year.

Jimmy Connors won the title, beating Björn Borg 7–6^{(7–5)}, 6–4, 6–0 in the final.

== Seeds ==
1. (United States) Jimmy Connors (champion)
2. (Sweden) Björn Borg (final)
3. (United States) Arthur Ashe (third round)
4. (Romania) Ilie Năstase (third round, defaulted)
5. (Australia) John Alexander (third round)
6. (United States) Roscoe Tanner (first round)
7. (Australia) Rod Laver (quarterfinals)
8. (Netherlands) Tom Okker (semifinals)
9. (Australia) Tony Roche (second round)
10. (Mexico) Raúl Ramírez (first round)
11. (United States) Vitas Gerulaitis (second round)
12. N/A
13. (United States) Harold Solomon (second round)
14. (United States) Eddie Dibbs (quarterfinals)
15. (Czechoslovakia) Jan Kodeš (quarterfinals)
16. (United States) Stan Smith (third round)

== Draw ==
=== Key ===
- Q = Qualifier
- WC = Wild card
- LL = Lucky loser
- Alt = Alternate
- SE = Special exempt
- PR = Protected ranking
- ITF = ITF entry
- JE = Junior exempt
- w/o = Walkover
- r = Retired
- d = Defaulted
- SR = Special ranking

=== Finals ===
Semifinals
2	(Sweden) Björn Borg	6	6	6
8	(Netherlands) Tom Okker	2	2	2
(United States) Dick Stockton	6	5	3	2
1	(United States) Jimmy Connors	3	7	6	6

Final
2	(Sweden) Björn Borg	6^{5}	4	0
1	(United States) Jimmy Connors	7^{7}	6	6

=== Top half ===
==== Section 1 ====
First round
(Australia) B Giltinan	6^{4}	3
(South Africa) B Mitton	7^{7}	6
15	(Czechoslovakia) J Kodeš	7^{7}	6
(South Africa) R Moore	6^{1}	2
(New Zealand) O Parun	6	7^{7}
(Australia) K Warwick	4	6^{5}

Second round
2	(Sweden) B Borg	6	6
(Egypt) I El Shafei	2	4
11	(United States) V Gerulaitis	6	3	6^{5}
(United Kingdom) M Cox	3	6	7^{7}
5	(Australia) J Alexander	6	6
(South Africa) B Mitton	3	4
15	(Czechoslovakia) J Kodeš	6	6
(New Zealand) O Parun	3	3

Third round
2	(Sweden) B Borg	6	6
(United Kingdom) M Cox	3	3
5	(Australia) J Alexander	6^{2}	3
15	(Czechoslovakia) J Kodeš	7^{7}	6

Quarterfinals
2	(Sweden) B Borg	7^{7}	6
15	(Czechoslovakia) J Kodeš	6^{5}	0

==== Section 2 ====
First round
4	(Romania) I Năstase	6	7^{7}
(New Zealand) B Fairlie	4	6^{4}
(Australia) P Dent
(United States) B Martin	DEF
14	(United States) E Dibbs	3	6	6
(United States) S Mayer	6	2	2
(South Africa) F McMillan	2	4
(Australia) D Crealy	6	6
8	(Netherlands) T Okker	6	7^{7}
(United States) C Richey	4	6^{5}
(Czechoslovakia) J Hřebec	DEF
(Socialist Federal Republic of Yugoslavia) Ž Franulović
(Australia) R Ruffels	2	0
(Australia) A Stone	6	6
(United States) M Riessen	7	7
(United States) J Borowiak	5	5

Second round
4	(Romania) I Năstase	5	6	6
(United States) B Martin	7	3	3
14	(United States) E Dibbs	2	7^{7}	6
(Australia) D Crealy	6	6^{2}	3
8	(Netherlands) T Okker	6	6^{5}	6
(Czechoslovakia) J Hřebec	3	7^{7}	4
(Australia) A Stone	6	6
(United States) M Riessen	1	4

Third round
4	(Romania) I Năstase
14	(United States) E Dibbs	DEF
8	(Netherlands) T Okker	6	6
(Australia) A Stone	4	4

Quarterfinals
14	(United States) E Dibbs	2	6	2
8	(Netherlands) T Okker	6	2	6

=== Bottom half ===
==== Section 3 ====
First round
(West Germany) K Meiler	6^{3}	3
(United States) R Lutz	7^{7}	6
(United States) S Stewart	6	6^{4}	3
9	(Australia) T Roche	2	7^{7}	6
(United States) E van Dillen	5	4
(South Africa) C Drysdale	7	6
(United States) D Stockton	7^{7}	6
6	(United States) R Tanner	6^{3}	3
(India) A Amritraj	7	6^{5}	4
(United States) T Gorman	5	7^{7}	6
(Poland) W Fibak	6	6^{3}	6^{5}
13	(United States) H Solomon	0	7^{7}	7^{7}
(Soviet Union) A Metreveli	5	4
(United States) C Pasarell	7	6
(Australia) F Stolle	6	4	5
3	(United States) A Ashe	3	6	7

Second round
(United States) R Lutz	6	6
9	(Australia) T Roche	3	3
(South Africa) C Drysdale	1	4
(United States) D Stockton	6	6
(United States) T Gorman	5	6	7^{7}
13	(United States) H Solomon	7	1	6^{4}
(United States) C Pasarell	6	2
3	(United States) A Ashe	7	6

Third round
(United States) R Lutz	6	4	4
(United States) D Stockton	4	6	6
(United States) T Gorman	6	3	6
3	(United States) A Ashe	3	6	3

Quarterfinals
(United States) D Stockton	7^{7}	6
(United States) T Gorman	6^{2}	2

==== Section 4 ====
First round
(Australia) G Masters	4	2
(United States) B Gottfried	6	6
(United States) A Pattison	6	2	6
10	(Mexico) R Ramírez	3	6	3
(Australia) R Case	6	6
(South Africa) B Hewitt	0	3

Second round
(United States) B Gottfried	6	7
(United States) A Pattison	1	5
(Australia) R Case	7	3	2
7	(Australia) R Laver	5	6	6
(India) V Amritraj	4	3
16	(United States) S Smith	6	6
(United States) D Ralston	4	0
1	(United States) J Connors	6	6

Third round
(United States) B Gottfried	6^{2}	6^{3}
7	(Australia) R Laver	7^{7}	7^{7}
16	(United States) S Smith	6	1	3
1	(United States) J Connors	4	6	6

Quarterfinals
7	(Australia) R Laver	3	4
1	(United States) J Connors	6	6
