= 1976 U.S. Pro Indoor – Doubles =

Doubles
- 1976 U.S. Pro Indoor

Final
- Champions: (Australia) Rod Laver (United States) Dennis Ralston
- Runners-up: (South Africa) Bob Hewitt (South Africa) Frew McMillan
- Score: 7–6^{(8–6)}, 7–6^{(7–3)}

Events
Singles	Doubles
← 1975 ·	U.S. Pro Indoor	· 1977 →

Rod Laver and Dennis Ralston won the title, defeating Bob Hewitt and Frew McMillan 7–6^{(8–6)}, 7–6^{(7–3)} in the final.

== Seeds ==
1. (United States) Brian Gottfried / (Mexico) Raúl Ramírez (quarterfinals)
2. (South Africa) Bob Hewitt / (South Africa) Frew McMillan (final)
3. (United States) Vitas Gerulaitis / (United States) Sandy Mayer (quarterfinals)
4. (United States) Jimmy Connors / (Romania) Ilie Năstase (second round, withdrew)
5. (United Kingdom) Mark Cox / (South Africa) Cliff Drysdale (first round)
6. (Australia) Ross Case / (Australia) Geoff Masters (second round)
7. (United States) Arthur Ashe / (Netherlands) Tom Okker (second round)
8. (United States) Robert Lutz / (United States) Stan Smith (semifinals)
9. (United States) Dick Stockton / (United States) Erik van Dillen (semifinals)
10. (Australia) John Alexander / (Australia) Phil Dent (first round, retired)

== Draw ==
=== Key ===
- Q = Qualifier
- WC = Wild card
- LL = Lucky loser
- Alt = Alternate
- SE = Special exempt
- PR = Protected ranking
- ITF = ITF entry
- JE = Junior exempt
- w/o = Walkover
- r = Retired
- d = Defaulted
- SR = Special ranking

=== Finals ===
Semifinals
(Australia) Rod Laver (United States) Dennis Ralston	7^{7}	6
8	(United States) Robert Lutz (United States) Stan Smith	6^{4}	4
9	(United States) Dick Stockton (United States) Erik van Dillen	6^{3}	4
2	(South Africa) Bob Hewitt (South Africa) Frew McMillan	7^{7}	6

Final
(Australia) Rod Laver (United States) Dennis Ralston	7^{8}	7^{7}
2	(South Africa) Bob Hewitt (South Africa) Frew McMillan	6^{6}	6^{3}

=== Top half ===
First round
6	(Australia) R Case (Australia) G Masters	6	7^{7}
(United States) J Borowiak (Australia) D Crealy	4	6^{5}
(Australia) R Laver (United States) D Ralston	6	6
(United States) E Dibbs (United States) H Solomon	2	4
3	(United States) V Gerulaitis (United States) S Mayer	7^{7}	7
(Egypt) I El Shafei (New Zealand) B Fairlie	6^{5}	5
10	(Australia) J Alexander (Australia) P Dent	5	0^{r}
(Australia) T Roche (United States) S Stewart	7	1
8	(United States) R Lutz (United States) S Smith	w/o
(Socialist Federal Republic of Yugoslavia) Ž Franulović (South Africa) B Mitton
(South Africa) R Moore (New Zealand) O Parun	3	3
(United States) C Richey (Australia) F Stolle	6	6

Second round
1	(United States) B Gottfried (Mexico) R Ramírez	6	6
(United States) C Pasarell (Australia) A Stone	4	0
6	(Australia) R Case (Australia) G Masters	2	6^{5}
(Australia) R Laver (United States) D Ralston	6	7^{7}
3	(United States) V Gerulaitis (United States) S Mayer	7^{7}	7^{7}
(Australia) T Roche (United States) S Stewart	6^{5}	6^{3}
8	(United States) R Lutz (United States) S Smith	6	6
(United States) C Richey (Australia) F Stolle	4	4

Quarterfinals
1	(United States) B Gottfried (Mexico) R Ramírez	3	6	6^{5}
(Australia) R Laver (United States) D Ralston	6	3	7^{7}
3	(United States) V Gerulaitis (United States) S Mayer	3	7	6^{5}
8	(United States) R Lutz (United States) S Smith	6	5	7^{7}

Semifinals
(Australia) R Laver (United States) D Ralston	7^{7}	6
8	(United States) R Lutz (United States) S Smith	6^{4}	4

=== Bottom half ===
First round
(Sweden) B Borg (Australia) B Giltinan	6	3	6^{2}
(India) A Amritraj (India) V Amritraj	4	6	7^{7}
(Czechoslovakia) J Hřebec (Czechoslovakia) J Kodeš	7	6
5	(United Kingdom) M Cox (South Africa) C Drysdale	5	4
(United States) B Martin (Soviet Union) A Metreveli	2	6	4
9	(United States) D Stockton (United States) E van Dillen	6	2	6
(Poland) W Fibak (West Germany) K Meiler	3	6	1
4	(United States) J Connors (Romania) I Năstase	6	3	6
(United States) M Riessen (United States) R Tanner	6	6
(Chile) J Fillol (United States) T Gorman	4	1

Second round
(India) A Amritraj (India) V Amritraj	6	4	4
(Czechoslovakia) J Hřebec (Czechoslovakia) J Kodeš	2	6	6
9	(United States) D Stockton (United States) E van Dillen	w/o
4	(United States) J Connors (Romania) I Năstase
(United States) M Riessen (United States) R Tanner	3	7	6
7	(United States) A Ashe (Netherlands) T Okker	6	5	1
(United States) A Pattison (Australia) K Warwick	2	4
2	(South Africa) B Hewitt (South Africa) F McMillan	6	6

Quarterfinals
(Czechoslovakia) J Hřebec (Czechoslovakia) J Kodeš	1	6	6^{0}
9	(United States) D Stockton (United States) E van Dillen	6	4	7^{7}
(United States) M Riessen (United States) R Tanner
2	(South Africa) B Hewitt (South Africa) F McMillan	w/o

Semifinals
9	(United States) D Stockton (United States) E van Dillen	6^{3}	4
2	(South Africa) B Hewitt (South Africa) F McMillan	7^{7}	6
