= 1976 Lagos WCT =

- Date: 9–15 February
- Edition: 1st
- Category: World Championship Tennis
- Draw: 16S / 8D
- Prize money: $60,000
- Surface: Clay (outdoors)
- Location: Lagos, Nigeria; Caracas, Venezuela
- Venue: Lagos Lawn Tennis Club

Champions

Singles
- (United States) Dick Stockton

Doubles
- final not played
- Lagos Open

The 1976 Lagos WCT, also known as the 1976 Lagos Tennis Classic, was a men's tennis tournament played on outdoor clay courts at the Lagos Lawn Tennis Club in Lagos, Nigeria. The event was part of the 1976 World Championship Tennis circuit. It was the inaugural edition of the tournament, which was the first professional tennis tournament in Black Africa, and was held from February 9 to 15, 1976. Unseeded Dick Stockton won the singles title.

== Attempted coup d'etat ==
In the morning of Friday, 13 February 1976, the Head of the Federal Military Government of Nigeria, Murtala Mohammed, was assassinated by a group of young army rebels in an attempted coup d'etat. Due to the following unrest the tournament was halted and no matches were played on Friday and Saturday. The passports of most of the players were in possession of Nigerian immigration and in order to get them back and leave the country John McDonald, WCT's International Director, ordered the tournament to resume on Sunday, 15 February. The quarterfinals of the singles event were played that day and the semifinals and final were scheduled for Monday. The doubles event was cancelled at the semifinals stage due to a lack of time.

On Monday, while Arthur Ashe and Jeff Borowiak were playing their semifinal match and had just started the second set, a group of soldiers entered the stadium and herded the players off the court at gunpoint. The two players fled to the US Embassy where they were later joined by the other players who had been staying in a hotel and by footballer Pelé, who was in the country on a tour sponsored by Pepsi. The following Tuesday the tennis players and officials were given an armed police escort to Lagos International Airport and left the country for Accra, Ghana on a plane provided by general Obasanjo's government. There, they connected to a Rome-bound flight, where they were scheduled to attend the following week's tournament in the Italian capital. The start of Rome WCT was delayed by a day in order to accommodate the players arriving from Lagos.

The Lagos WCT's semifinal and final were concluded on 1 and 2 April, in Venezuela in-between another regularly scheduled tournament (the Caracas WCT) in order to allocate the prize money and ranking points of Lagos WCT.

== Finals ==
=== Singles ===
(United States) Dick Stockton defeated (United States) Arthur Ashe, 6–3, 6–2

=== Doubles ===
The doubles event was cancelled at the semifinal stage.
