= 1977 World Championship Tennis Finals =

- Date: May 10–15
- Edition: 7th
- Category: World Championship Tennis
- Draw: 8S
- Prize money: $200,000
- Surface: Carpet / Indoor
- Location: Dallas, Texas, US
- Venue: Moody Coliseum

Champions

Singles
- (United States) Jimmy Connors
- WCT Finals

The 1977 World Championship Tennis Finals was a tennis tournament played on indoor carpet courts. It was the 7th edition of the WCT Finals and was part of the 1977 World Championship Tennis circuit. It was played at the Moody Coliseum in Dallas, Texas in the United States and was held from May 10 through May 15, 1977.

== Final ==
=== Singles ===
(United States) Jimmy Connors defeated (United States) Dick Stockton 6–7^{(5–7)}, 6–1, 6–4, 6–3

- It was Connors' 4th singles title of the year and the 57th of his career.

== See also ==
- 1977 WCT World Doubles
