= 1977 London WCT =

- Date: 28 March – 3 April
- Edition: 6th
- Category: WCT
- Draw: 16S / 8D
- Prize money: $100,000
- Surface: Carpet / indoor
- Location: London, England
- Venue: Earls Court Exhibition Centre
- Attendance: 30,000+

Champions

Singles
- (United States) Eddie Dibbs

Doubles
- (Romania) Ilie Năstase / (Italy) Adriano Panatta
← 1975 ·	London WCT

The London WCT was a men's professional tennis tournament held on indoor carpet courts at the Earls Court Exhibition Centre in London, England. It was the sixth and final edition of the tournament and was held from 28 March through 3 April 1977. The event was part of the 1977 World Championship Tennis circuit. Fourth-seeded Eddie Dibbs won the singles title and £18,000 / $30,000 first–prize money.

== Finals ==
=== Singles ===
(United States) Eddie Dibbs defeated (United States) Vitas Gerulaitis 7–6^{(7–2)}, 6–7^{(5–7)}, 6–4

- It was Dibbs' 2nd singles title of the year and the 12th of his career.

=== Doubles ===
(Romania) Ilie Năstase / (Italy) Adriano Panatta defeated (United Kingdom) Mark Cox / (United States) Eddie Dibbs 7–6^{(7–5)}, 6–7^{(3–7)}, 6–3
