= 1970 Rothmans International Tennis Tournament =

Tennis tournament

- Date: 4-7 March
- Edition: 1st
- Category: Independent
- Prize money: £10,000
- Surface: Carpet / Indoor
- Location: London, England
- Venue: Royal Albert Hall

Champions

Singles
- (United States) Marty Riessen

Doubles
- (Netherlands) Tom Okker / (United States) Marty Riessen
Rothmans International Tennis Tournament	· 1971 →

The 1970 Rothmans International Tennis Tournament was a men's professional tennis tournament held on indoor carpet courts in the Royal Albert Hall in London, England. It was the first edition of the tournament and was held from 4–7 March 1970. It was an independent event, i.e. not part of either the 1970 Grand Prix or 1970 World Championship Tennis circuit. Marty Riessen won both the singles and doubles competition and £2525 in prize money.

== Finals ==
=== Singles ===
(United States) Marty Riessen defeated (Australia) Ken Rosewall 6–4, 6–2 (Note: The match was shortened from a best–of–five match to a best–of–three match on request of Marty Riessen as he had already played a doubles match earlier on the day that lasted almost three hours.)

=== Doubles ===
(Netherlands) Tom Okker / (United States) Marty Riessen defeated (Australia) Rod Laver / (Australia) Owen Davidson 6–3, 13–11, 9–11, 2–6, 7–5
