= 1976 Monterrey WCT =

- Date: January 6–11
- Edition: 1st
- Category: World Championship Tennis
- Draw: 16S / 8D
- Prize money: $60,000
- Surface: Carpet (indoors)
- Location: Monterrey, Mexico

Champions

Singles
- (United States) Eddie Dibbs

Doubles
- (United States) Brian Gottfried / (Mexico) Raúl Ramírez
Monterrey WCT	· 1977 →

The 1976 Monterrey WCT was a men's tennis tournament played on indoor carpet courts in Monterrey, Mexico. The event was part of the 1976 World Championship Tennis circuit. It was the inaugural edition of the tournament and was held from January 6 to 11, 1976. Fourth-seeded Eddie Dibbs won the singles title.

== Finals ==
=== Singles ===
(United States) Eddie Dibbs defeated (United States) Harold Solomon, 7–6, 6–2

- It was Dibbs' 1st singles title of the year and the 7th of his career.

=== Doubles ===
(United States) Brian Gottfried / (Mexico) Raúl Ramírez defeated (Australia) Ross Case / (Australia) Geoff Masters, 6–2, 4–6, 6–3

== See also ==
- 1976 Mexico City WCT
