= 1972 Rothmans International Tennis Tournament =

- Date: 18–22 January
- Edition: 3rd
- Category: USLTA Indoor Circuit
- Draw: 16S
- Surface: Carpet / Indoor
- Location: London, England
- Venue: Royal Albert Hall

Champions

Singles
- (United States) Cliff Richey

Doubles
- (United States) Clark Graebner / (United States) Tom Gorman
← 1971 ·	Rothmans International Tennis Tournament	· 1973 →

The 1972 Rothmans International Tennis Tournament was a men's professional tennis tournament held on indoor carpet courts in the Royal Albert Hall in London, England. It was the third edition of the tournament and was held from 18 to 22 January 1972. It was part of the 1972 USLTA Indoor Circuit. Cliff Richey won the singles title and $6,960 in prize money after defeating Clark Graebner in a three-hour-and-six-minute final.

== Finals ==
=== Singles ===
(United States) Cliff Richey defeated (United States) Clark Graebner 7–5, 6–7, 7–5, 6–0

=== Doubles ===
(United States) Clark Graebner / (United States) Tom Gorman defeated (South Africa) Bob Hewitt / (South Africa) Frew McMillan 6–7, 7–5, 6–4, 4–6, 6–4
