= 1977 U.S. Pro Indoor – Singles =

Singles
- 1977 U.S. Pro Indoor

Final
- Champion: (United States) Dick Stockton
- Runner-up: (United States) Jimmy Connors
- Score: 3–6, 6–4, 3–6, 6–1, 6–2

Details
- Draw: 50
- Seeds: 16

Events
Singles	Doubles
← 1976 ·	U.S. Pro Indoor	· 1978 →

Jimmy Connors was the defending champion but lost in the final this year.

Dick Stockton won the title, beating Connors 3–6, 6–4, 3–6, 6–1, 6–2 in the final.

== Seeds ==
1. (United States) Jimmy Connors (final)
2. (Sweden) Björn Borg (second round)
3. (Romania) Ilie Năstase (second round)
4. (Spain) Manuel Orantes (second round)
5. (Italy) Adriano Panatta (third round)
6. (United States) Harold Solomon (third round)
7. (United States) Eddie Dibbs (third round)
8. (United States) Brian Gottfried (third round)
9. (United States) ~~Arthur Ashe~~ (withdrew)
10. (Australia) Ken Rosewall (quarterfinals)
11. (Poland) Wojtek Fibak (third round)
12. (United States) Dick Stockton (champion)
13. (United States) ~~Stan Smith~~ (withdrew)
14. (United Kingdom) Mark Cox (second round)
15. (United States) Vitas Gerulaitis (second round)
16. (Czechoslovakia) Jan Kodeš (second round)

== Draw ==
=== Key ===
- Q = Qualifier
- WC = Wild card
- LL = Lucky loser
- Alt = Alternate
- SE = Special exempt
- PR = Protected ranking
- ITF = ITF entry
- JE = Junior exempt
- w/o = Walkover
- r = Retired
- d = Defaulted
- SR = Special ranking

=== Finals ===
Semifinals
12	(United States) Dick Stockton	6	6	7^{7}
(United States) Jeff Borowiak	3	4	6^{3}
(South Africa) Cliff Drysdale	2	2	2
1	(United States) Jimmy Connors	6	6	6

Final
12	(United States) Dick Stockton	3	6	3	6	6
1	(United States) Jimmy Connors	6	4	6	1	2

=== Top half ===
==== Section 1 ====
First round
(Australia) J Alexander	6	4	7^{7}
(Pakistan) H Rahim	4	6	6^{5}

Second round
2	(Sweden) B Borg	6^{5}	4
(South Africa) R Moore	7^{7}	6
10	(Australia) K Rosewall	6	6
(New Zealand) O Parun	3	3
8	(United States) B Gottfried	7	6
(United States) B Martin	5	4
12	(United States) D Stockton	6	6^{6}	7^{7}
(Australia) J Alexander	4	7^{8}	6^{4}

Third round
(South Africa) R Moore	4	4
10	(Australia) K Rosewall	6	6
8	(United States) B Gottfried	3	2
12	(United States) D Stockton	6	6

Quarterfinals
10	(Australia) K Rosewall	0	3
12	(United States) D Stockton	6	6

==== Section 2 ====
First round
4	(Spain) M Orantes	7	6
(United States) S Mayer	5	4
(United States) F McNair	7^{7}	6
(United Kingdom) R Taylor	6^{3}	2
(United States) T Waltke	6	4	6
(South Africa) B Bertram	3	6	1
(India) V Amritraj	6	6
(South Africa) B Hewitt	3	2
6	(United States) H Solomon	6	6
(United States) J Delaney	4	4
(Australia) R Case	6	6
(Israel) S Krulevitz	1	3
15	(United States) V Gerulaitis	6	6
(United States) B Walts	3	2
(United States) J Borowiak	6	3	6
(Netherlands) T Okker	3	6	3

Second round
4	(Spain) M Orantes	6	6^{6}	4
(United States) F McNair	2	7^{8}	6
(United States) T Waltke	1	6	2
(India) V Amritraj	6	4	6
6	(United States) H Solomon	6	6
(Australia) R Case	3	2
15	(United States) V Gerulaitis	4	6	3
(United States) J Borowiak	6	3	6

Third round
(United States) F McNair	2	7	3
(India) V Amritraj	6	5	6
6	(United States) H Solomon	0	4
(United States) J Borowiak	6	6

Quarterfinals
(India) V Amritraj	6	2	5
(United States) J Borowiak	3	6	7

=== Bottom half ===
==== Section 3 ====
First round
(South Africa) B Mitton	6	3	7
(Czechoslovakia) J Hřebec	4	6	5
(Rhodesia) A Pattison	6	7^{7}
(United States) T Moor	2	6^{4}
(United States) S Stewart	6	6
(United States) P DuPré	3	4
(Australia) R Laver	6	0	1
7	(United States) E Dibbs	4	6	6
(South Africa) C Drysdale	6	6
(United States) C Pasarell	3	4
(Soviet Union) A Metreveli	3	2
14	(United Kingdom) M Cox	6	6
(United States) B Scanlon	1	6	6
(United Kingdom) M Wayman	6	0	3
(Italy) C Barazzutti	6	0	3
3	(Romania) I Năstase	4	6	6

Second round
(South Africa) B Mitton	6	6
(Rhodesia) A Pattison	4	3
(United States) S Stewart	0	3
7	(United States) E Dibbs	6	6
(South Africa) C Drysdale	6	6
14	(United Kingdom) M Cox	3	1
(United States) B Scanlon	2	6	6
3	(Romania) I Năstase	6	1	4

Third round
(South Africa) B Mitton	6	4	6
7	(United States) E Dibbs	4	6	3
(South Africa) C Drysdale	6	7^{8}
(United States) B Scanlon	3	6^{6}

Quarterfinals
(South Africa) B Mitton	6	5	3
(South Africa) C Drysdale	2	7	6

==== Section 4 ====
First round
(South Africa) F McMillan	4	3
(Australia) T Roche	6	6

Second round
(Australia) T Roche	6	6
16	(Czechoslovakia) J Kodeš	4	0
(United States) T Gorman	4	6	4
5	(Italy) A Panatta	6	3	6
(United States) G Mayer	4	3
11	(Poland) W Fibak	6	6
(United Kingdom) B Mottram	3	2
1	(United States) J Connors	6	6

Third round
(Australia) T Roche	6	6
5	(Italy) A Panatta	3	4
11	(Poland) W Fibak	2	2
1	(United States) J Connors	6	6

Quarterfinals
(Australia) T Roche	2	2
1	(United States) J Connors	6	6
