= 1976 U.S. Pro Indoor =

- Date: January 26 – February 1
- Edition: 9th
- Category: World Championship Tennis
- Draw: 64S / 32D
- Prize money: $118,600
- Surface: Carpet / indoor
- Location: Philadelphia, PA, United States
- Venue: Spectrum

Champions

Singles
- (United States) Jimmy Connors

Doubles
- (Australia) Rod Laver / (United States) Dennis Ralston
- U.S. Pro Indoor

The 1976 U.S. Pro Indoor was a men's tennis tournament played on indoor carpet courts that was part of the WCT circuit. It was the 9th edition of the tournament and was played at the Spectrum in Philadelphia, Pennsylvania in the United States from January 26 through February 1, 1976. First-seeded Jimmy Connors won the singles title.

== Finals ==
=== Singles ===
(United States) Jimmy Connors defeated (Sweden) Björn Borg 7–6^{(7–5)}, 6–4, 6–0

- It was Connors' 2nd singles title of the year and the 43rd of his career.

=== Doubles ===
(Australia) Rod Laver / (United States) Dennis Ralston defeated (South Africa) Bob Hewitt / (South Africa) Frew McMillan 7–6^{(8–6)}, 7–6^{(7–3)}

- It was Laver's 1st title of the year and the 66th of his career. It was Ralston's only title of the year and the 3rd of his career.
