= 1977 World Championship Tennis Finals – Singles =

Singles
- 1977 World Championship Tennis Finals

Final
- Champion: (United States) Jimmy Connors
- Runner-up: (United States) Dick Stockton
- Score: 6–7, 6–1, 6–4, 6–3

Details
- Draw: 8
- Seeds: 8

Events
Singles
- World Championship Tennis Finals

Björn Borg was the defending champion but did not compete that year.

Jimmy Connors won in the final 6–7, 6–1, 6–4, 6–3 against Dick Stockton.

== Seeds ==
A champion seed is indicated in bold text while text in italics indicates the round in which that seed was eliminated.

1. (United States) **Jimmy Connors (champion)**
2. (United States) Dick Stockton (final)
3. (Romania) Ilie Năstase (quarterfinals)
4. (Poland) Wojciech Fibak (quarterfinals)
5. (United States) Vitas Gerulaitis (semifinals)
6. (United States) Eddie Dibbs (semifinals)
7. (Italy) Adriano Panatta (quarterfinals)
8. (South Africa) Cliff Drysdale (quarterfinals)

== Draw ==
Key

- Q = Qualifier
- WC = Wild card
- LL = Lucky loser
- Alt = Alternate
- ITF = ITF entry
- PR = Protected ranking
- SR = Special ranking
- SE = Special exempt
- JE = Junior exempt
- JR = Junior Accelerator Programme entrant
- CO = College Accelerator Programme entrant
- NG = Next Gen Accelerator Program entrant
- w/o = Walkover
- r = Retired
- d = Defaulted

Quarterfinals
1	(United States) **Jimmy Connors**	**6**	**7**	**6**
7	(Italy) Adriano Panatta	4	5	4
3	(Romania) Ilie Năstase	1	**6**	2	3
6	(United States) **Eddie Dibbs**	**6**	4	**6**	**6**
5	(United States) **Vitas Gerulaitis**	1	3	**6**	**6**	**6**
4	(Poland) Wojciech Fibak	**6**	**6**	0	2	3
8	(South Africa) Cliff Drysdale	5	**7**	6	2
2	(United States) **Dick Stockton**	**7**	6	**7**	**6**

Semifinals
1	(United States) **Jimmy Connors**	**6**	**7**	**6**
6	(United States) Eddie Dibbs	4	5	1
5	(United States) Vitas Gerulaitis	6	**6**	**7**	3	3
2	(United States) **Dick Stockton**	**7**	3	6	**6**	**6**

Final
1	(United States) **Jimmy Connors**	6	**6**	**6**	**6**
2	(United States) Dick Stockton	**7**	1	4	3
