= 1977 Charlotte Tennis Classic =

- Date: April 18–24
- Edition: 7th
- Category: World Championship Tennis
- Draw: 16S / 8D
- Prize money: $100,000
- Surface: Clay / outdoor
- Location: Charlotte, North Carolina, U.S.
- Venue: Olde Providence Racquet Club

Champions

Singles
- (Italy) Corrado Barazzutti

Doubles
- (Netherlands) Tom Okker / (Australia) Ken Rosewall
← 1976 ·	Carolinas International Tennis Tournament

The 1977 Charlotte Tennis Classic, also known by its sponsored name North Carolina National Bank Tennis Classic, was a men's tennis tournament played on outdoor clay courts that was part of the World Championship Tennis (WCT) circuit. It was the seventh edition of the tournament and was held from April 18 through April 24, 1977 at the Julian J. Clark Tennis Stadium, owned by the Olde Providence Racquet Club in Charlotte, North Carolina in the United States. Unseeded Corrado Barazzutti won the singles title and earned $30,000 first-prize money.

== Finals ==
=== Singles ===
(Italy) Corrado Barazzutti defeated (United States) Eddie Dibbs 7–6, 6–0

- It was Barazzutti's 1st title of the year and the 2nd of his career.

=== Doubles ===
(Netherlands) Tom Okker / (Australia) Ken Rosewall defeated (Italy) Corrado Barazzutti / (Italy) Adriano Panatta 6–1, 3–6, 7–6
