= Rothmans International Tennis Tournament =

Coordinates: 51°30′03.40″N 00°10′38.77″W

Defunct tennis tournament
- Tour: WCT (1973–1977)
- Founded: 1970
- Abolished: 1977
- Editions: 7
- Location: London, England
- Venue: Royal Albert Hall (1970–1975); Earls Court Exhibition Centre (1977)
- Surface: Carpet / indoor

The Rothmans International Tennis Tournament was a men's tennis tournament held in London, England between 1970 and 1977. The tournament was played on indoor carpet courts at Royal Albert Hall in London, except for the final edition in 1977 which was played at Earls Court Exhibition Centre, and was held in the March. From 1973 until 1977 the tournament was organized as part of the World Championship Tennis circuit.

== Past finals ==
=== Singles ===
Year	Champions	Runners-up	Score
1970	(United States) Marty Riessen	(Australia) Ken Rosewall	6–4, 6–2
1971	(Australia) Rod Laver	(Socialist Federal Republic of Yugoslavia) Nikola Pilić	6–4, 6–0, 6–2
1972	(United States) Cliff Richey	(United States) Clark Graebner	7–5, 6–7, 7–5, 6–0
1973	(New Zealand) Brian Fairlie	(United Kingdom) Mark Cox	2–6, 6–2, 6–2, 7–6
1974	(Sweden) Björn Borg	(United Kingdom) Mark Cox	6–7, 7–6, 6–4
1975	(United Kingdom) Mark Cox	(New Zealand) Brian Fairlie	6–1, 7–5
1976	Not played		
1977	(United States) Eddie Dibbs	(United States) Vitas Gerulaitis	7–6, 6–7, 6–4

=== Doubles ===
Year	Champions	Runners-up	Score
1970	(Netherlands) Tom Okker (United States) Marty Riessen	(Australia) Rod Laver (Australia) Owen Davidson	6–3, 13–11, 9–11, 2–6, 7–5
1971	Not played		
1972	(United States) Clark Graebner (United States) Tom Gorman	(South Africa) Bob Hewitt (South Africa) Frew McMillan	6–7, 6–5, 6–4, 4–6, 6–4
1973	(Netherlands) Tom Okker (United States) Marty Riessen	(United States) Arthur Ashe (United States) Roscoe Tanner	6–3, 6–3
1974	(Sweden) Björn Borg (Sweden) Ove Bengtson	(United Kingdom) Mark Farrell (United Kingdom) John Lloyd	7–6, 6–3
1975	(Italy) Paolo Bertolucci (Italy) Adriano Panatta	(West Germany) Jürgen Fassbender (West Germany) Hans-Jürgen Pohmann	6–3, 6–4
