= 1977 Monterrey WCT =

- Date: February 26 – March 6
- Edition: 2nd
- Category: WCT circuit
- Draw: 16S / 8D
- Prize money: $100,000
- Surface: Carpet / indoor
- Location: Monterrey, Mexico

Champions

Singles
- (Poland) Wojciech Fibak

Doubles
- (Poland) Wojciech Fibak / (Australia) Ross Case
← 1976 ·	Monterrey WCT	· 1981 →

The 1977 Monterrey WCT was a men's tennis tournament played on indoor carpet courts in Monterrey, Mexico. The event was part of the 1977 World Championship Tennis circuit. The tournament was held from February 26 to March 6, 1977. Unseeded Wojciech Fibak won the singles title.

== Finals ==
=== Singles ===
(Poland) Wojciech Fibak defeated (United States) Vitas Gerulaitis 6–4, 6–3

- It was Fibak's 1st singles title of the year and the 4th of his career.

=== Doubles ===
(Poland) Wojciech Fibak / (Australia) Ross Case defeated (United States) Billy Martin / (United States) Bill Scanlon 3–6, 6–3, 6–4
