= 1977 ABN World Tennis Tournament – Singles =

Singles
- 1977 ABN World Tennis Tournament

Final
- Champion: (United States) Dick Stockton
- Runner-up: (Romania) Ilie Năstase
- Score: 2–6, 6–3, 6–3

Details
- Draw: 16
- Seeds: 4

Events
Singles	Doubles
- ABN World Tennis Tournament

Arthur Ashe was the defending champion of the singles event at the ABN World Tennis Tournament, but did not participate in this edition. First-seeded Dick Stockton won the singles title after a victory in the final against second-seeded Ilie Năstase 2–6, 6–3, 6–3.

== Seeds ==
1. (United States) Dick Stockton (champion)
2. (Romania) Ilie Năstase (final)
3. (United States) Eddie Dibbs (first round)
4. (South Africa) Cliff Drysdale (second round)

== Draw ==
=== Men's singles ===
First round
1	(United States) Dick Stockton	6	6
(United States) Harold Solomon	3	4
(India) Vijay Amritraj	1	7	6
(Spain) Manuel Orantes	6	6^{6}	2
(Italy) Corrado Barazzutti	6	3	6
(South Africa) Raymond Moore	4	6	4
(Poland) Wojtek Fibak	6	4	6
3	(United States) Eddie Dibbs	2	6	4
4	(South Africa) Cliff Drysdale	7	7
(New Zealand) Onny Parun	6^{4}	6^{4}
(Netherlands) Tom Okker	3	6	3
(United Kingdom) Mark Cox	6	4	6
(Australia) John Alexander	6	1
(Italy) Adriano Panatta	2	r
(Czechoslovakia) Jan Kodeš	4	4
2	(Romania) Ilie Năstase	6	6

Second round
1	(United States) Dick Stockton	6	6
(India) Vijay Amritraj	1	3
(Italy) Corrado Barazzutti	0	1
(Poland) Wojtek Fibak	6	6
4	(South Africa) Cliff Drysdale	3	3
(United Kingdom) Mark Cox	6	6
(Australia) John Alexander	4	2
2	(Romania) Ilie Năstase	6	6

Semifinals
1	(United States) Dick Stockton	6^{6}	7	6
(Poland) Wojtek Fibak	7	6^{5}	4
(United Kingdom) Mark Cox	4	6^{5}
2	(Romania) Ilie Năstase	6	7

Finals
1	(United States) Dick Stockton	2	6	6
2	(Romania) Ilie Năstase	6	3	3
