= 1974 Richmond WCT =

- Date: January 29 – February 3
- Edition: 9th
- Category: World Championship Tennis (WCT)
- Draw: 32S / 16D
- Prize money: $50,000
- Surface: Carpet / indoor
- Location: Richmond, Virginia, U.S.
- Venue: Richmond Coliseum

Champions

Singles
- (Romania) Ilie Năstase

Doubles
- (Socialist Federal Republic of Yugoslavia) Nikola Pilić / (Australia) Allan Stone
← 1973 ·	Richmond WCT	· 1975 →

The 1974 Richmond WCT, also known as the Fidelity Tournament for sponsorship reasons, was a men's professional tennis tournament. It was held on indoor carpet courts at the Richmond Coliseum in Richmond, Virginia in the United States. It was the ninth edition of the tournament and was held from January 29 through February 3, 1974. The tournament was part of the red group of the 1974 World Championship Tennis circuit. First-seeded Ilie Năstase won the singles title, his second at the event after 1971, and earned $10,000 first-prize money.

== Finals ==
=== Singles ===
(Romania) Ilie Năstase defeated (United States) Tom Gorman 6–2, 6–3

- It was Năstase's 1st singles title of the year and the 37th of his career.

=== Doubles ===
(Socialist Federal Republic of Yugoslavia) Nikola Pilić / (Australia) Allan Stone defeated (Australia) John Alexander / (Australia) Phil Dent 6–3, 3–6, 7–6
