= Mexico City WCT =

Defunct tennis tournament
- Event name: Mexico City WCT
- Tour: WCT Tour
- Founded: 1976
- Abolished: 1982
- Editions: 4
- Location: Mexico City, Mexico
- Surface: Carpet / indoor

The Mexico City WCT was a men's tennis tournament played in Mexico City, Mexico from 1976 to 1978 and in 1982. The event was part of the WCT Tour and was played on indoor carpet courts.

== Finals ==
=== Singles ===
Year	Champions	Runners-up	Score
1976	(Mexico) Raúl Ramírez	(United States) Eddie Dibbs	7–6, 6–2
1977	(Romania) Ilie Năstase	(Poland) Wojciech Fibak	4–6, 6–2, 7–6
1978	(Mexico) Raúl Ramírez	(United States) Pat Du Pré	6–4, 6–1
1982	(Czechoslovakia) Tomáš Šmíd	(United States) John Sadri	3–6, 7–6, 4–6, 7–6, 6–2

=== Doubles ===
Year	Champions	Runners-up	Score
1976	(United States) Brian Gottfried (Mexico) Raúl Ramírez	(Egypt) Ismail El Shafei (New Zealand) Brian Fairlie	6–4, 7–6^{(7–4)}
1977	(Poland) Wojciech Fibak (Netherlands) Tom Okker	(Romania) Ilie Năstase (Italy) Adriano Panatta	6–2, 6–3
1978	(United States) Gene Mayer (India) Sashi Menon	(Mexico) Marcelo Lara (Mexico) Raúl Ramírez	6–3, 7–6
1982	(United States) Sherwood Stewart (United States) Ferdi Taygan	(Czechoslovakia) Tomáš Šmíd (Hungary) Balázs Taróczy	6–4, 7–5

== See also ==
- Monterrey WCT
