= Richmond WCT =

Defunct tennis tournament
- Event name: Fidelity Bankers Invitational; United Virginia Bank Tennis Classic
- Tour: ILTF World Circuit (1966–1971); WCT Tour (1972–1984); Grand Prix (1978–1981)
- Founded: 1966
- Abolished: 1984
- Editions: 19
- Location: Richmond, Virginia
- Venue: Richmond Arena; Richmond Coliseum; Robins Center
- Surface: Carpet / indoor

The Richmond WCT, also known by its sponsored names Fidelity Bankers Invitational and United Virginia Bank Tennis Classic, was a men's tennis tournament played in Richmond, Virginia in the United States founded in 1966 as the Richmond Invitational Indoor Championships . The inaugural edition in February 1966 was a two-day event with eight player and without prize money. The first six editions, from 1966 through 1971, were invitational tournaments and were held at the Richmond Arena. The 1970 edition was the first one to offer prize money, namely $12,500. In 1972 the event became part of the World Championship Tennis (WCT) Tour (Note: From 1978 until 1981 the WCT circuit was incorporated into the Grand Prix circuit.) and moved to the Richmond Coliseum. All subsequent editions were held at the Coliseum except for the 1983 edition which was held at the Robins Center. All editions were held on indoor carpet courts. Lou Einwick was the tournament chairman or director for all editions.

== Finals ==
=== Singles ===
Year	Champion	Runner-up	Score
1966	(United States) Chuck McKinley	(United States) Frank Froehling	6–1, 6–2
1967	(United States) Charlie Pasarell	(United States) Arthur Ashe	6–3, 8–6
1968	(United States) Arthur Ashe	(United States) Chuck McKinley	6–2, 6–1
1969	(United States) Clark Graebner	(Brazil) Thomaz Koch	6–3, 10–12, 9–7
1970	(United States) Arthur Ashe (2)	(United States) Stan Smith	6–2, 13–11
1971	(Romania) Ilie Năstase	(United States) Arthur Ashe	3–6, 6–2, 6–4
1972	(Australia) Rod Laver	(South Africa) Cliff Drysdale	2–6, 6–3, 7–5, 6–3
1973	(Australia) Rod Laver (2)	(Australia) Roy Emerson	6–4, 6–3
1974	(Romania) Ilie Năstase	(United States) Tom Gorman	6–2, 6–3
1975	(Sweden) Björn Borg	(United States) Arthur Ashe	4–6, 6–4, 6–4
1976	(United States) Arthur Ashe (3)	(United States) Brian Gottfried	6–2, 6–4
1977	(Netherlands) Tom Okker	(United States) Vitas Gerulaitis	3–6, 6–3, 6–4
1978	(United States) Vitas Gerulaitis	(Australia) John Newcombe	6–3, 6–4
1979	(Sweden) Björn Borg (2)	(Argentina) Guillermo Vilas	6–3, 6–1
1980	(United States) John McEnroe	(United States) Roscoe Tanner	6–1, 6–2
1981	(France) Yannick Noah	(Czech Republic) Ivan Lendl	6–1, 3–1, RET.
1982	(Argentina) José Luis Clerc	(United States) Fritz Buehning	3–6, 6–3, 6–4, 6–3
1983	(Argentina) Guillermo Vilas	(United States) Steve Denton	6–3, 7–5, 6–4
1984	(United States) John McEnroe (2)	(United States) Steve Denton	6–3, 7–6^{(9–7)}

=== Doubles ===
Year	Champions	Runners-up	Score
1966	(United States) Chuck McKinley (United States) Gene Scott	(United States) Arthur Ashe (United States) Cliff Richey	6–8, 8–6, 7–5
1967	(United States) Arthur Ashe (United States) Charlie Pasarell	(South Africa) Cliff Drysdale (United States) Ron Holmberg	6–1, 6–4
1968	(United States) Arthur Ashe (United States) Charlie Pasarell	(United States) Ron Holmberg (United States) Bob Lutz	6–4, 6–4
1969	(United States) Bob McKinley (United States) Jim McManus	(United States) Arthur Ashe (United States) Cliff Richey	8–6, 3–6, 7–5
1970	(United States) Arthur Ashe (United States) Charlie Pasarell	(United States) Jim McManus (United States) Stan Smith	9–7, 6–2
1971	(United States) Arthur Ashe (United States) Dennis Ralston	(Australia) John Newcombe (Australia) Ken Rosewall	7–6, 3–6, 7–6
1972	(Netherlands) Tom Okker (United States) Marty Riessen	(Australia) John Newcombe (Australia) Tony Roche	7–6, 7–6
1973	(Australia) Roy Emerson (Australia) Rod Laver	(Australia) Terry Addison (Australia) Colin Dibley	3–6, 6–3, 6–4
1974	(Socialist Federal Republic of Yugoslavia) Nikola Pilić (Australia) Allan Stone	(Australia) John Alexander (Australia) Phil Dent	6–3, 3–6, 7–6
1975	(Austria) Hans Kary (United States) Fred McNair	(Italy) Paolo Bertolucci (Italy) Adriano Panatta	7–6, 5–7, 7–6
1976	(United States) Brian Gottfried (Mexico) Raúl Ramírez	(United States) Arthur Ashe (Netherlands) Tom Okker	6–4, 7–5
1977	(Poland) Wojtek Fibak (Netherlands) Tom Okker	(Australia) Ross Case (Australia) Tony Roche	6–4, 6–4
1978	(South Africa) Bob Hewitt (South Africa) Frew McMillan	(United States) Vitas Gerulaitis (United States) Sandy Mayer	6–3, 7–5
1979	(United States) Brian Gottfried (United States) John McEnroe	(Romania) Ion Țiriac (Argentina) Guillermo Vilas	6–4, 6–3
1980	(United States) Fritz Buehning (South Africa) Johan Kriek	(United States) Brian Gottfried (South Africa) Frew McMillan	3–6, 6–3, 7–6
1981	(United States) Tim Gullikson (South Africa) Bernard Mitton	(United States) Brian Gottfried (Mexico) Raúl Ramírez	3–6, 6–2, 6–3
1982	(Australia) Mark Edmondson (Australia) Kim Warwick	(Australia) Syd Ball (Germany) Rolf Gehring	6–4, 6–2
1983	(Czech Republic) Pavel Složil (Czech Republic) Tomáš Šmíd	(United States) Fritz Buehning (United States) Brian Teacher	6–2, 6–4
1984	(United States) John McEnroe (United States) Patrick McEnroe	(United States) Steve Denton (South Africa) Kevin Curren	7–6, 6–2

== See also ==
- Virginia Slims of Richmond – women's tournament
