= Dick Stockton (tennis) =

American tennis player

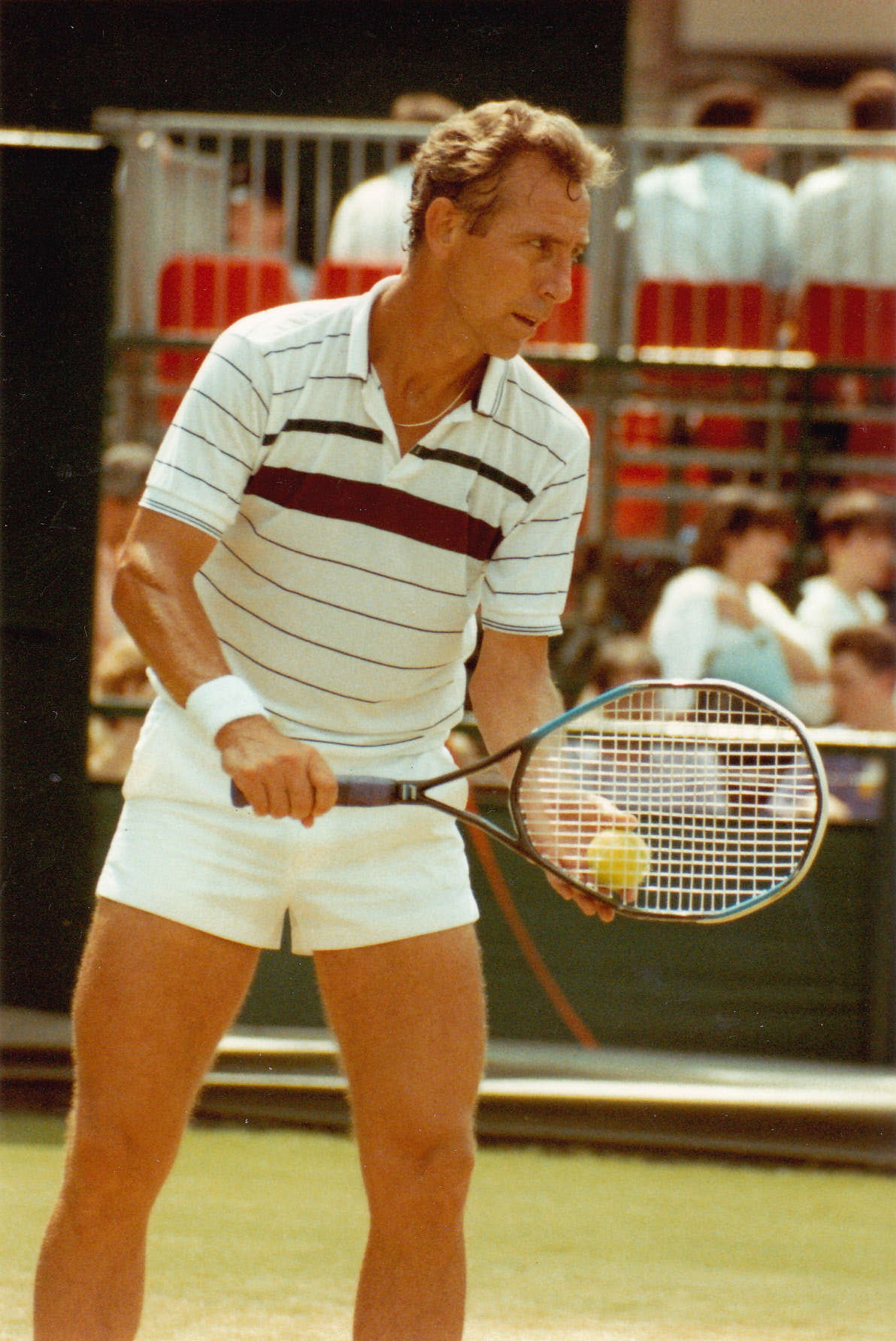
- Stockton at Wimbledon circa 1990
- Full name: Richard LaClede Stockton
- Country (sports): United States
- Residence: Charlottesville, Virginia, US
- Born: February 18, 1951 (age 75) New York, NY, US
- Height: 1.88 m (6 ft 2 in)
- Turned pro: 1971 (1967 ILTF amateur)
- Retired: 1986
- Plays: Right-handed (1-handed backhand)
- Prize money: $1,063,385

Singles
- Career record: 481–302
- Career titles: 24, inc (8) ATP
- Highest ranking: No. 8 (October 31, 1977)

Grand Slam singles results
- Australian Open: 3R (1977^{Jan})
- French Open: SF (1978)
- Wimbledon: SF (1974)
- US Open: QF (1976, 1977)

Other tournaments
- WCT Finals: F (1977)

Doubles
- Career record: 328–207
- Career titles: 16
- Highest ranking: No. 13 (August 30, 1977)

Grand Slam doubles results
- Australian Open: 2R (1977)
- French Open: SF (1979)
- Wimbledon: SF (1981)
- US Open: SF (1979)

Grand Slam mixed doubles results
- French Open: W (1984)
- Wimbledon: F (1976)
- US Open: W (1975)

Richard LaClede Stockton (born February 18, 1951) is an American former professional tennis player. In addition to his playing career, he was the head coach of the men's tennis team at the University of Virginia from 1998–2001. Stockton also served as the Head Men's Tennis Coach at Piedmont College in Demorest, Georgia from 2018–2021.

Stockton's highest world ranking was world No. 8. He reached the semifinals of Wimbledon in 1974, the quarterfinals of the U.S. Open in 1976 and 1977 and the semifinals in the 1978 French Open. Stockton played on the U.S. Davis Cup Team five times (1973, 1975, 1976, 1977, 1979), including the U.S. Davis Cup Championship Team in 1979.

== Grand Slam finals ==
=== Mixed doubles (2 titles, 1 runner-up) ===
Result	Year	Championship	Surface	Partner	Opponents	Score
Win	1975	US Open	Clay	(United States) Rosie Casals	(Australia) Fred Stolle (United States) Billie Jean King	6–3, 6–7, 6–3
Loss	1976	Wimbledon	Grass	(United States) Rosie Casals	(France) Françoise Dürr (Australia) Tony Roche	3–6, 6–2, 5–7
Win	1984	French Open	Clay	(United States) Anne Smith	(Australia) Anne Minter (Australia) Laurie Warder	6–2, 6–4

== Career finals ==
=== Singles: 18 (8 titles / 10 runners-up) ===
Result	W-L	Date	Tournament	Surface	Opponent	Score
Loss	0–1	Aug 1971	Merion, U.S.	Hard	(United States) Clark Graebner	2–6, 4–6, 7–6, 5–7
Loss	0–2	Jan 1973	Miami WCT, U.S.	Hard	(Australia) Rod Laver	6–7, 3–6, 5–7
Win	1–2	Mar 1974	Atlanta WCT, U.S.	Clay	(Czechoslovakia) Jiří Hřebec	6–2, 6–1
Loss	1–3	Apr 1974	Charlotte, U.S.	Clay	(United States) Jeff Borowiak	4–6, 7–5, 6–7^{(5–7)}
Win	2–3	Oct 1974	Melbourne, Australia	Grass	(Australia) Geoff Masters	6–2, 6–3, 6–2
Loss	2–4	Feb 1975	Fort Worth WCT, U.S.	Hard	(Australia) John Alexander	6–7^{(2–7)}, 6–4, 3–6
Win	3–4	Mar 1975	San Antonio WCT, U.S.	Hard	(United States) Stan Smith	7–5, 2–6, 7–6^{(8–6)}
Loss	3–5	Mar 1975	Washington Indoor WCT, U.S.	Carpet	(United Kingdom) Mark Cox	2–6, 6–7^{(5–7)}
Win	4–5	Apr 1976	Lagos WCT, Nigeria (Note: The tournament was halted at the semifinal stage due to a coup d'etat attempt in Nigeria and the final was played on April 2 during the Caracas WCT tournament.)	Clay	(United States) Arthur Ashe	6–3, 6–2
Loss	4–6	Jan 1977	Sydney Outdoor, Australia	Grass	(Australia) Tony Roche	3–6, 6–3, 3–6, 4–6
Win	5–6	Jan 1977	Philadelphia WCT, U.S.	Carpet	(United States) Jimmy Connors	3–6, 6–4, 3–6, 6–1, 6–2
Win	6–6	Feb 1977	Toronto Indoor WCT, Canada	Carpet	(United States) Jimmy Connors	5–6, RET.
Win	7–6	Mar 1977	Rotterdam, Netherlands	Carpet	(Romania) Ilie Năstase	2–6, 6–3, 6–3
Loss	7–7	May 1977	Dallas WCT, U.S. – WCT Finals	Carpet	(United States) Jimmy Connors	7–6, 1–6, 4–6, 3–6
Loss	7–8	Jan 1978	Birmingham WCT, U.S.	Carpet	(Sweden) Björn Borg	6–7^{(4–7)}, 5–7
Win	8–8	Feb 1978	Little Rock, U.S.	Carpet	(United States) Hank Pfister	6–4, 3–5, RET.
Loss	8–9	Oct 1978	San Francisco, U.S.	Carpet	(United States) John McEnroe	6–2, 6–7^{(5–7)}, 2–6
Loss	8–10	Aug 1981	South Orange, U.S.	Clay	(Israel) Shlomo Glickstein	3–6, 7–5, 4–6

=== Doubles: 31 (16 titles / 15 runners-up) ===
Result	W-L	Date	Tournament	Surface	Partner	Opponents	Score
Loss	0–1	Aug 1971	Merion, U.S.	Hard	(United States) Chuck McKinley	(United States) Clark Graebner (United States) Jim Osborne	6–7, 3–6
Loss	0–2	Jul 1972	Columbus, U.S.	Hard	(United States) Chuck McKinley	(United States) Jimmy Connors (United States) Pancho Gonzales	3–6, 5–7
Win	1–2	Feb 1973	Philadelphia WCT, U.S.	Carpet	(United States) Brian Gottfried	(Australia) Roy Emerson (Australia) Rod Laver	4–6, 6–3, 6–4
Win	2–2	May 1973	Las Vegas, U.S.	Hard	(United States) Brian Gottfried	(Australia) Ken Rosewall (Australia) Fred Stolle	6–7, 6–4, 6–4
Win	3–2	Oct 1973	Fort Worth, U.S.	Hard	(United States) Brian Gottfried	(Australia) Owen Davidson (Australia) John Newcombe	7–6, 6–4
Loss	3–3	Mar 1974	Atlanta WCT, U.S.	Clay	(United States) Brian Gottfried	(United States) Robert Lutz (United States) Stan Smith	3–6, 6–3, 6–7
Loss	3–4	Apr 1974	Orlando WCT, U.S.	Clay	(United States) Brian Gottfried	(Australia) Owen Davidson (Australia) John Newcombe	6–7, 3–6
Win	4–4	Oct 1974	Maui, U.S.	Hard	(United States) Roscoe Tanner	(Australia) Owen Davidson (Australia) John Newcombe	6–3, 7–6
Loss	4–5	Jan 1975	Philadelphia WCT, U.S.	Carpet	(United States) Erik van Dillen	(United States) Brian Gottfried (Mexico) Raúl Ramírez	6–3, 3–6, 6–7^{(4–7)}
Win	5–5	Feb 1975	Toronto Indoor WCT, Canada	Carpet	(United States) Erik van Dillen	(India) Anand Amritraj (India) Vijay Amritraj	6–4, 7–5, 6–1
Win	6–5	Mar 1975	Memphis WCT, U.S.	Carpet	(United States) Erik van Dillen	(United Kingdom) Mark Cox (South Africa) Cliff Drysdale	1–6, 7–5, 6–4
Win	7–5	Oct 1976	San Francisco, U.S.	Carpet	(United States) Roscoe Tanner	(United States) Brian Gottfried (South Africa) Bob Hewitt	6–3, 6–4
Loss	7–6	Oct 1976	Maui, U.S.	Hard	(United States) Roscoe Tanner	(South Africa) Raymond Moore (Australia) Allan Stone	7–6, 3–6, 4–6
Win	8–6	Oct 1976	Perth, Australia	Hard	(United States) Roscoe Tanner	(Australia) Bob Carmichael (Egypt) Ismail El Shafei	6–7, 6–1, 6–2
Win	9–6	Jan 1977	Adelaide, Australia	Grass	(Australia) Cliff Letcher	(Australia) Syd Ball (Australia) Kim Warwick	6–3, 4–6, 6–4
Loss	9–7	Mar 1977	St. Louis WCT, U.S.	Carpet	(India) Vijay Amritraj	(Romania) Ilie Năstase (Italy) Adriano Panatta	4–6, 6–3, 6–7
Loss	9–8	Mar 1977	Rotterdam, Netherlands	Carpet	(India) Vijay Amritraj	(Poland) Wojciech Fibak (Netherlands) Tom Okker	4–6, 4–6
Win	10–8	May 1977	Masters Doubles, New York	Carpet	(India) Vijay Amritraj	(United States) Vitas Gerulaitis (Italy) Adriano Panatta	7–6, 7–6, 4–6, 6–3
Win	11–8	Oct 1977	San Francisco, U.S.	Carpet	(United States) Marty Riessen	(United States) Fred McNair (United States) Sherwood Stewart	6–4, 1–6, 6–4
Loss	11–9	Jan 1978	Birmingham WCT, U.S.	Carpet	(South Africa) Frew McMillan	(United States) Vitas Gerulaitis (United States) Sandy Mayer	6–3, 1–6, 6–7
Win	12–9	Aug 1978	New Orleans, U.S.	Carpet	(United States) Erik van Dillen	(Egypt) Ismail El Shafei (New Zealand) Brian Fairlie	7–6, 6–3
Win	13–9	Aug 1978	Cleveland, U.S.	Hard	(United States) Erik van Dillen	(United States) Rick Fisher (United States) Bruce Manson	6–1, 6–4
Win	14–9	Jan 1979	Birmingham, U.S.	Carpet	(United States) Stan Smith	(Romania) Ilie Năstase (Netherlands) Tom Okker	6–2, 6–3
Loss	14–10	Mar 1979	Memphis, U.S.	Carpet	(South Africa) Frew McMillan	(Poland) Wojciech Fibak (Netherlands) Tom Okker	4–6, 4–6
Win	15–10	Apr 1980	Tulsa, U.S.	Hard (i)	(United States) Robert Lutz	(Paraguay) Francisco González (United States) Van Winitsky	2–6, 7–6, 6–2
Loss	15–11	Nov 1980	Bangkok, Thailand	Carpet	(Netherlands) Tom Okker	(United States) Ferdi Taygan (United States) Brian Teacher	6–7, 6–7
Loss	15–12	Mar 1981	Denver, U.S.	Carpet	(United States) Mel Purcell	(Zimbabwe) Andrew Pattison (United States) Butch Walts	3–6, 4–6
Loss	15–13	Feb 1982	La Quinta, U.S.	Hard	(United Kingdom) John Lloyd	(United States) Brian Gottfried (Mexico) Raúl Ramírez	4–6, 6–3, 2–6
Loss	15–14	May 1982	Forest Hills WCT, U.S.	Clay	(United States) Erik van Dillen	(United States) Tracy Delatte (United States) Johan Kriek	4–6, 6–3, 3–6
Win	16–14	Dec 1982	Hartford WCT, U.S.	Carpet	(United States) Robert Lutz	(United States) Mike Cahill (United States) Tracy Delatte	7–6, 6–3
Loss	16–15	Jul 1983	South Orange, U.S.	Clay	(United Kingdom) John Lloyd	(United States) Fritz Buehning (United States) Tom Cain	2–6, 5–7
