= 1970 ITPA Open Indoor =

Tennis tournament

- Date: February 2–8
- Edition: 3rd
- Category: ILTF World Circuit
- Draw: 64S / 32D
- Prize money: $60,000
- Surface: Carpet / indoor
- Location: Philadelphia, PA, United States
- Venue: Spectrum

Champions

Men's singles
- (Australia) Rod Laver

Women's singles
- (Australia) Margaret Court

Men's doubles
- (Romania) Ilie Năstase / (Romania) Ion Țiriac
← 1969 ·	ITPA Open Indoor	· 1971 →

The 1970 International Tennis Players Association Open Indoor or ITPA Open Indoor was an ILTF tennis tournament played on indoor carpet courts. It was played at the Spectrum in Philadelphia, Pennsylvania in the United States. It was the third edition of the tournament and was held from February 2 through February 8, 1970.

The men's singles was won by Rod Laver, his second consecutive singles title at the event, and the women's singles was won by Margaret Court

== Finals ==
=== Men's Singles ===
(Australia) Rod Laver defeated (Australia) Tony Roche 6–3, 8–6, 6–2

- It was Laver's 1st title of the year and the 12th of his professional career.

=== Men's Doubles ===
(Romania) Ilie Năstase / (Romania) Ion Țiriac defeated (United States) Arthur Ashe / (United States) Dennis Ralston 6–4, 6–3

- It was Nastase's 1st title of the year and the 2nd of his professional career. It was Țiriac's 1st title of the year and the 1st of his professional career.

=== Women's singles ===
(Australia) Margaret Court defeated (United States) Billie Jean King 6–3, 7–6
