= 1991 U.S. Pro Indoor =

- Date: February 11–18
- Edition: 24th
- Category: Championship Series
- Draw: 48S / 24D
- Prize money: $825,000
- Surface: Carpet / indoor
- Location: Philadelphia, PA, United States
- Venue: Spectrum

Champions

Singles
- (Czechoslovakia) Ivan Lendl

Doubles
- (United States) Rick Leach / (United States) Jim Pugh
← 1990 ·	U.S. Pro Indoor	· 1992 →

The 1991 U.S. Pro Indoor was a men's tennis tournament played on indoor carpet courts that was part of the Championship Series of the 1991 ATP Tour. It was the 24th edition of the tournament and was played at the Spectrum in Philadelphia, Pennsylvania in the United States from February 11 to February 18, 1991. First-seeded Ivan Lendl won the singles title, his second at the event after 1986.

== Finals ==
=== Singles ===
(Czechoslovakia) Ivan Lendl defeated (United States) Pete Sampras 5–7, 6–4, 6–4, 3–6, 6–3

- It was Lendl's 1st singles title of the year and the 89th of his career.

=== Doubles ===
(United States) Rick Leach / (United States) Jim Pugh defeated (Germany) Udo Riglewski / (Germany) Michael Stich 6–4, 6–4

- It was Leach's 1st title of the year and the 19th of his career. It was Pugh's 1st title of the year and the 20th of his career.
