= 1972 U.S. Professional Indoor – Singles =

Singles
- 1972 U.S. Professional Indoor

Final
- Champion: (Australia) Rod Laver
- Runner-up: (Australia) Ken Rosewall
- Score: 4–6, 6–2, 6–2, 6–2

Details
- Draw: 32
- Seeds: 8

Events
Singles	Doubles
← 1971 ·	U.S. Professional Indoor	· 1973 →

The 1972 U.S. Professional Indoor – singles was an event of the 1971 U.S. Professional Indoor men's tennis tournament played at the Spectrum in Philadelphia in the United States from February 8 through February 13, 1971. The draw comprised 32 players and 8 of them were seeded. John Newcombe was the defending singles champion but lost in the second round. First-seeded Rod Laver won the title, defeating second-seeded Ken Rosewall in the final, 4–6, 6–2, 6–2, 6–2.

== Seeds ==
1. (Australia) Rod Laver (champion)
2. (Australia) Ken Rosewall (final)
3. (United States) Arthur Ashe (semifinals)
4. (Netherlands) Tom Okker (semifinals)
5. (Australia) John Newcombe (second round)
6. (South Africa) Cliff Drysdale (quarterfinals)
7. (United States) Marty Riessen (quarterfinals)
8. (United States) Robert Lutz (quarterfinals)

== Draw ==
=== Key ===
- Q = Qualifier
- WC = Wild card
- LL = Lucky loser
- Alt = Alternate
- SE = Special exempt
- PR = Protected ranking
- ITF = ITF entry
- JE = Junior exempt
- w/o = Walkover
- r = Retired
- d = Defaulted
- SR = Special ranking

=== Finals ===
Semifinals
2	(Australia) Ken Rosewall	2	7	7	6
3	(United States) Arthur Ashe	6	6	6	2
4	(Netherlands) Tom Okker	3	3	3
1	(Australia) Rod Laver	6	6	6

Final
2	(Australia) Ken Rosewall	6	2	2	2
1	(Australia) Rod Laver	4	6	6	6

=== Top half ===
Second round
2	(Australia) Ken Rosewall	6	6
(Socialist Federal Republic of Yugoslavia) Nikola Pilić	4	1
(United Kingdom) Roger Taylor	6	5	6
(New Zealand) Brian Fairlie	4	7	4
(Australia) John Alexander	7	3	6
(United Kingdom) Mark Cox	6	6	3
(Australia) Ray Ruffels	4	2
7	(United States) Marty Riessen	6	6

Quarterfinals
2	(Australia) K Rosewall	6	6
(United Kingdom) R Taylor	3	2
(Australia) J Alexander	6	3	6
7	(United States) M Riessen	4	6	7

Semifinals
2	(Australia) K Rosewall	6	6	6
7	(United States) M Riessen	1	7	3
Semifinals
2	(South Africa) C Drysdale	6	2	7	6
3	(United States) A Ashe	7	6	2

=== Bottom half ===
Second round
4	(Netherlands) Tom Okker	6	6
(United States) Tom Leonard	2	4
(Australia) Terry Addison	6	2	6
(Egypt) Ismail El Shafei	4	6	4
(United States) Jeff Borowiak	6	6
(United States) Roy Barth	2	2
(Australia) Phil Dent	4	4
5	(Australia) John Newcombe	6	6

Quarterfinals
4	(Netherlands) T Okker	6	6
(Australia) T Addison	1	4
(United States) J Borowiak	6	5	6
5	(Australia) J Newcombe	1	7	4

Semifinals
4	(Netherlands) T Okker	7	6
(United States) J Borowiak	5	3
Semifinals
4	(United States) R Lutz	6	1	3
1	(Australia) R Laver	7	6
