= 1968 Philadelphia International Indoor Championships =

- Date: February 5–11
- Edition: 1st
- Category: World Championship Tennis
- Draw: 12S
- Surface: Carpet / indoor
- Location: Philadelphia, PA, United States
- Venue: Spectrum
- Attendance: 23,074

Champions

Singles
- (Spain) Manuel Santana

Doubles
- No competition held
Philadelphia International Indoor Championships	· 1969 →

The 1968 Philadelphia International Indoor Championships was a WCT men's tennis tournament played on indoor carpet courts. It was played at the Spectrum in Philadelphia, Pennsylvania in the United States. It was the inaugural edition of the tournament and was held from February 5 through February 11, 1968. Manuel Santana won the singles title and commented that the slow rubber-like surface suited his game.

== Finals ==
=== Singles ===
(Spain) Manuel Santana defeated (Denmark) Jan Leschly 8–6, 6–3

- It was Santana's only title of the year and the 1st of his professional career.

=== Doubles ===
No doubles competition was held but on the final day a doubles exhibition match was played.
(United States) Arthur Ashe / (United States) Charlie Pasarell defeated (Brazil) Thomaz Koch / (Denmark) Torben Ulrich 6–3, 12–10
