= 1975 U.S. Pro Indoor =

- Date: January 20–26
- Edition: 8th
- Category: World Championship Tennis
- Draw: 128S / 64D
- Prize money: $115,000
- Surface: Carpet / indoor
- Location: Philadelphia, PA, U.S.
- Venue: Spectrum

Champions

Singles
- (United States) Marty Riessen

Doubles
- (United States) Brian Gottfried / (Mexico) Raúl Ramírez
- U.S. Pro Indoor

The 1975 U.S. Pro Indoor was a men's WCT tennis tournament played on indoor carpet courts at the Spectrum in Philadelphia, Pennsylvania in the United States. It was the eighth edition of the tournament and was held from January 20 through January 26, 1975. Seventh-seeded Marty Riessen won the singles title.

== Finals ==
=== Singles ===
(United States) Marty Riessen defeated (United States) Vitas Gerulaitis 7–6^{(7–1)}, 5–7, 6–2, 6–7^{(0–7)}, 6–3

- It was Riessen's only title of the year and the 41st of his career.

=== Doubles ===
(United States) Brian Gottfried / (Mexico) Raúl Ramírez defeated (United States) Dick Stockton / (United States) Erik van Dillen 3–6, 6–3, 7–6^{(7–4)}

- It was Gottfried's 1st title of the year and the 9th of his career. It was Ramirez's 2nd title of the year and the 12th of his career.
