= 1993 Comcast U.S. Indoor =

- Date: February 15–22
- Edition: 26th
- Category: Championship Series
- Draw: 32S / 16D
- Prize money: $575,000
- Surface: Carpet / indoor
- Location: Philadelphia, U.S.
- Venue: Spectrum

Champions

Singles
- (Australia) Mark Woodforde

Doubles
- (United States) Jim Grabb / (United States) Richey Reneberg
← 1992 ·	U.S. Pro Indoor	· 1994 →

The 1993 Comcast U.S. Indoor was a men's tennis tournament played on indoor carpet courts that was part of the Championship Series of the 1993 ATP Tour. It was the 26th edition of the tournament and was played at the Spectrum in Philadelphia, Pennsylvania in the United States from February 15 to February 22, 1993. Unseeded Mark Woodforde won the singles title.

== Finals ==
=== Singles ===
(Australia) Mark Woodforde defeated (United States) Ivan Lendl 5–4 (Lendl retired)

- It was Woodforde's only singles title of the year and the 4th of his career.

=== Doubles ===
(United States) Jim Grabb / (United States) Richey Reneberg defeated (South Africa) Marcos Ondruska / (United States) Brad Pearce 6–7, 6–3, 6–0

- It was Grabb's only title of the year and the 16th of his career. It was Reneberg's 3rd title of the year and the 11th of his career.
