= 1972 U.S. Professional Indoor – Doubles =

Doubles
- 1972 U.S. Professional Indoor

Final
- Champions: (United States) Arthur Ashe (United States) Robert Lutz
- Runners-up: (Australia) John Newcombe (Australia) Tony Roche
- Score: 6–3, 6–7, 6–3

Events
Singles	Doubles
← 1971 ·	U.S. Professional Indoor	· 1973 →

Arthur Ashe and Robert Lutz won the title, defeating John Newcombe and Tony Roche 6–3, 6–7, 6–3 in the final.

== Seeds ==
1. (Netherlands) Tom Okker / (United States) Marty Riessen (semifinals)
2. (Australia) Roy Emerson / (Australia) Rod Laver (quarterfinals)
3. (Australia) Ken Rosewall / (Australia) Fred Stolle (semifinals)
4. (Australia) John Alexander / (Australia) Phil Dent (quarterfinals)

== Draw ==
=== Key ===
- Q = Qualifier
- WC = Wild card
- LL = Lucky loser
- Alt = Alternate
- SE = Special exempt
- PR = Protected ranking
- ITF = ITF entry
- JE = Junior exempt
- w/o = Walkover
- r = Retired
- d = Defaulted
- SR = Special ranking

=== Draw ===
First round
1	(Netherlands) T Okker (United States) M Riessen	6	6
(Egypt) I El Shafei (New Zealand) B Fairlie	4	4
(United Kingdom) M Cox (United Kingdom) G Stilwell	6	6
(South Africa) R Maud (Australia) A Stone	3	4
(United States) A Ashe (United States) R Lutz	5	6	7
(South Africa) C Drysdale (United Kingdom) R Taylor	7	2	6
(United States) R Barth (United States) T Leonard	7	3	4
4	(Australia) J Alexander (Australia) P Dent	6	6	6
3	(Australia) K Rosewall (Australia) F Stolle	6	3	6
(United States) F Froehling (United States) C Pasarell	1	6	1
(Australia) B Carmichael (Australia) R Ruffels	6	6
(United States) R Holmberg (Socialist Federal Republic of Yugoslavia) N Pilić	4	3
(Australia) J Newcombe (Australia) T Roche	6	6
(Australia) B Bowrey (Australia) O Davidson	4	4
(Australia) T Addison (United States) J Borowiak	4	2
2	(Australia) R Emerson (Australia) R Laver	6	6

Quarterfinals
1	(Netherlands) T Okker (United States) M Riessen	4	6	7
(United Kingdom) M Cox (United Kingdom) G Stilwell	6	1	6
(United States) A Ashe (United States) R Lutz	7	6	6
4	(Australia) J Alexander (Australia) P Dent	6	7	4
3	(Australia) K Rosewall (Australia) F Stolle	6	6
(Australia) B Carmichael (Australia) R Ruffels	4	4
(Australia) J Newcombe (Australia) T Roche	7	6
2	(Australia) R Emerson (Australia) R Laver	6	4

Semifinals
1	(Netherlands) T Okker (United States) M Riessen	6	4	6
(United States) A Ashe (United States) R Lutz	3	6	7
3	(Australia) K Rosewall (Australia) F Stolle	4	4
(Australia) J Newcombe (Australia) T Roche	6	6

Final
(United States) A Ashe (United States) R Lutz	6	6	6
(Australia) J Newcombe (Australia) T Roche	3	7	3
