= 1973 U.S. Professional Indoor =

- Date: February 6–11
- Edition: 6th
- Category: World Championship Tennis
- Draw: 32S / 16D
- Prize money: $50,000
- Surface: Carpet / indoor
- Location: Philadelphia, PA, United States
- Venue: Spectrum
- Attendance: 60,055

Champions

Singles
- (United States) Stan Smith

Doubles
- (United States) Brian Gottfried / (United States) Dick Stockton
- U.S. Professional Indoor

The 1973 U.S. Professional Indoor was a men's tennis tournament played on indoor carpet courts at the Spectrum in Philadelphia, Pennsylvania in the United States that was part of the 1973 World Championship Tennis circuit. It was the sixth edition of the tournament and was held from February 6 through February 11, 1973. Third-seeded Stan Smith won the singles title.

== Finals ==
=== Singles ===
(United States) Stan Smith defeated (United States) Robert Lutz 7–6^{(7–2)}, 7–6^{(7–5)}, 4–6, 6–4

- It was Smith's 1st title of the year and the 28th of his career.

=== Doubles ===
(United States) Brian Gottfried / (United States) Dick Stockton defeated (Australia) Roy Emerson / (Australia) Rod Laver 4–6, 6–3, 6–4

- It was Gottfried's 1st title of the year and the 1st of his career. It was Stockton's 1st title of the year and the 1st of his career.
