= 1993 Comcast U.S. Indoor – Doubles =

Doubles
- 1993 Comcast U.S. Indoor

Final
- Champions: (United States) Jim Grabb (United States) Richey Reneberg
- Runners-up: (South Africa) Marcos Ondruska (United States) Brad Pearce
- Score: 6–7, 6–3, 6–0

Events
Singles	Doubles
← 1992 ·	Comcast U.S. Indoor	· 1994 →

Todd Woodbridge and Mark Woodforde were the defending champions, but lost in the first round this year.

Jim Grabb and Richey Reneberg won the title, defeating Marcos Ondruska and Brad Pearce 6–7, 6–3, 6–0 in the final.

== Seeds ==
1. (United States) Jim Grabb / (United States) Richey Reneberg (champions)
2. (Australia) Todd Woodbridge / (Australia) Mark Woodforde (first round)
3. (United States) Patrick McEnroe / (United States) Jared Palmer (semifinals)
4. (Netherlands) Jacco Eltingh / (Netherlands) Paul Haarhuis (semifinals)

== Draw ==
=== Key ===
- Q = Qualifier
- WC = Wild card
- LL = Lucky loser
- Alt = Alternate
- SE = Special exempt
- PR = Protected ranking
- ITF = ITF entry
- JE = Junior exempt
- w/o = Walkover
- r = Retired
- d = Defaulted
- SR = Special ranking

=== Draw ===
First round
1	(United States) J Grabb (United States) R Reneberg	6	6
(United States) B Garnett (United States) M Keil	4	4
(United States) J Pugh (United States) G Van Emburgh	6	3	2
WC	(United States) P Sampras (United States) J Tarango	4	6	6
3	(United States) P McEnroe (United States) J Palmer	2	6	6
(United Kingdom) N Broad (South Africa) S Kruger	6	1	1
(United States) K Kinnear (United States) S Salumaa	6	7
(United States) M Briggs (United States) T Kronemann	4	6
(United States) S Cannon (United States) S Melville	4	3
(Canada) G Michibata (United States) D Pate	6	6
Q	(Sweden) C Allgårdh (Australia) C Limberger	1	6
4	(Netherlands) J Eltingh (Netherlands) P Haarhuis	6	7
WC	(United States) B Gilbert (Spain) E Sánchez	6	2	3
(United States) K Flach (United States) D Randall	4	6	6
(South Africa) M Ondruska (United States) B Pearce	6	7
2	(Australia) T Woodbridge (Australia) M Woodforde	3	6

Quarterfinals
1	(United States) J Grabb (United States) R Reneberg	6	6
WC	(United States) P Sampras (United States) J Tarango	4	2
3	(United States) P McEnroe (United States) J Palmer	6	6
(United States) K Kinnear (United States) S Salumaa	1	4
(Canada) G Michibata (United States) D Pate	2	3
4	(Netherlands) J Eltingh (Netherlands) P Haarhuis	6	6
(United States) K Flach (United States) D Randall	6	7	5
(South Africa) M Ondruska (United States) B Pearce	7	6	7

Semifinals
1	(United States) J Grabb (United States) R Reneberg	6	6
3	(United States) P McEnroe (United States) J Palmer	3	1
4	(Netherlands) J Eltingh (Netherlands) P Haarhuis	5	4
(South Africa) M Ondruska (United States) B Pearce	7	6

Final
1	(United States) J Grabb (United States) R Reneberg	6	6	6
(South Africa) M Ondruska (United States) B Pearce	7	3	0
