= 1980 U.S. Pro Indoor =

- Date: January 21–27
- Edition: 13th
- Category: Grand Prix (WCT)
- Draw: 64S / 32D
- Prize money: $250,000
- Surface: Carpet / indoor
- Location: Philadelphia, United States
- Venue: Spectrum

Champions

Singles
- (United States) Jimmy Connors

Doubles
- (United States) Peter Fleming / (United States) John McEnroe
- U.S. Pro Indoor

The 1980 U.S. Pro Indoor was a men's tennis tournament played on indoor carpet courts that was part of World Championship Tennis (WCT) category of tournaments of the 1980 Volvo Grand Prix circuit. It was played at the Spectrum in Philadelphia, Pennsylvania in the United States and was held from January 21 through January 27, 1980. First-seeded Jimmy Connors won the singles title after a final that lasted three hours and 30 minutes and earned $40,000 first-prize money. It was his fourth singles title at the tournament which equalled the record held by Rod Laver.

== Finals ==
=== Singles ===
(United States) Jimmy Connors defeated (United States) John McEnroe 6–3, 2–6, 6–3, 3–6, 6–4

- It was Connors' 2nd title of the year and the 93rd of his career.

=== Doubles ===
(United States) Peter Fleming / (United States) John McEnroe defeated (United States) Brian Gottfried / (Mexico) Raúl Ramírez 6–3, 7–6

- It was Fleming's 1st title of the year and the 25th of his career. It was McEnroe's 1st title of the year and the 38th of his career.
