= 1994 Comcast U.S. Indoor =

- Date: February 14–21
- Edition: 27th
- Category: Championship Series
- Draw: 32S / 16D
- Prize money: $588,750
- Surface: Carpet / indoor
- Location: Philadelphia, U.S.
- Venue: Spectrum

Champions

Singles
- (United States) Michael Chang

Doubles
- (Netherlands) Jacco Eltingh / (Netherlands) Paul Haarhuis
← 1993 ·	U.S. Pro Indoor	· 1995 →

The 1994 Comcast U.S. Indoor was a men's tennis tournament played on indoor carpet courts that was part of the Championship Series of the 1994 ATP Tour. It was the 27th edition of the tournament and was played at the Spectrum in Philadelphia, Pennsylvania in the United States from February 14 to February 21, 1994. Third-seeded Michael Chang won the singles title.

== Finals ==
=== Singles ===
(United States) Michael Chang defeated (Netherlands) Paul Haarhuis 6–3, 6–2

- It was Chang's 2nd singles title of the year and the 15th of his career.

=== Doubles ===
(Netherlands) Jacco Eltingh / (Netherlands) Paul Haarhuis defeated (United States) Jim Grabb / (United States) Jared Palmer 6–3, 6–4

- It was Eltingh's 2nd title of the year and the 16th of his career. It was Haarhuis' 2nd title of the year and the 15th of his career.
