= 1970 ITPA Open Indoor – Men's singles =

Men's singles
- 1970 ITPA Open Indoor

Final
- Champion: (Australia) Rod Laver
- Runner-up: (Australia) Tony Roche
- Score: 6–3, 8–6, 6–2

Details
- Draw: 48
- Seeds: 12

Events
| Singles | Doubles |
| ← 1969 · | ITPA Open Indoor | · 1971 → |

Rod Laver was the defending champion.

Laver successfully defended his title, defeating Tony Roche 6–3, 8–6, 6–2 in the final.

== Seeds ==
1. (Australia) Rod Laver (champion)
2. (Australia) Tony Roche (final)
3. (Australia) John Newcombe (semifinals)
4. (Netherlands) Tom Okker (third round)
5. (Australia) Ken Rosewall (second round)
6. (Spain) Andrés Gimeno (first round)
7. (Australia) Fred Stolle (third round)
8. (United States) Arthur Ashe (third round)
9. (Australia) Roy Emerson (third round)
10. (United States) Earl Butch Buchholz (quarterfinals)
11. (United States) Stan Smith (third round)
12. (United States) Dennis Ralston (semifinals)

== Draw ==
=== Key ===
- Q = Qualifier
- WC = Wild card
- LL = Lucky loser
- Alt = Alternate
- SE = Special exempt
- PR = Protected ranking
- ITF = ITF entry
- JE = Junior exempt
- w/o = Walkover
- r = Retired
- d = Defaulted
- SR = Special ranking

=== Finals ===
Semifinals
1 | (Australia) Rod Laver | 8 | 6 | 6
12 | (United States) Dennis Ralston | 6 | 1 | 4
3 | (Australia) John Newcombe | 0 | 3 | 4
2 | (Australia) Tony Roche | 6 | 6 | 6

Final
1 | (Australia) Rod Laver | 6 | 8 | 6
2 | (Australia) Tony Roche | 3 | 6 | 2

=== Top half ===
==== Section 1 ====
First round
(United Kingdom) R Taylor | 6 | 8
Q | (United States) J Borowiak | 3 | 6
Q | (United States) H Fitzgibbon | 6 | 6
LL | (West Germany) I Buding | 3 | 2
Q | (India) J Singh | 6 | 3 | 5
(Australia) B Carmichael | 4 | 6 | 7
(Romania) I Năstase | 6 | 7
6 | (Spain) A Gimeno | 2 | 5

Second round
1 | (Australia) R Laver | 6 | 6
(United Kingdom) G Stilwell | 2 | 3
(Chile) J Fillol | 0 | 4
9 | (Australia) R Emerson | 6 | 6
(United Kingdom) R Taylor | 6 | 6
Q | (United States) H Fitzgibbon | 4 | 1
(Australia) B Carmichael | 2 | 1
(Romania) I Năstase | 6 | 6

Third round
1 | (Australia) R Laver | 4 | 6 | 6
9 | (Australia) R Emerson | 6 | 3 | 4
(United Kingdom) R Taylor | 4 | 4
(Romania) I Năstase | 6 | 6

Quarterfinals
1 | (Australia) R Laver | 4 | 6 | 8
(Romania) I Năstase | 6 | 2 | 6

==== Section 2 ====
First round
5 | (Australia) K Rosewall | 6 | 6
(United States) R Barth | 1 | 3
(United States) C Graebner | 6 | 4 | 6
(India) P Lall | 1 | 6 | 4
(United States) J McManus | 8 | 6
(Denmark) T Ulrich | 6 | 1
(United Arab Republic) I El Shafei | 3 | 2
(Spain) M Santana | 6 | 6

Second round
5 | (Australia) K Rosewall | 3 | 2
(United States) C Graebner | 6 | 6
(United States) J McManus | 2 | 2
(Spain) M Santana | 6 | 6
12 | (United States) D Ralston | 7 | 6
(Romania) I Țiriac | 5 | 3
Q | (United States) Donald Lutz | 3 | 1
4 | (Netherlands) T Okker | 6 | 6

Third round
(United States) C Graebner | 6 | 4 | 6
(Spain) M Santana | 3 | 6 | 3
12 | (United States) D Ralston | 6 | 6 | 6
4 | (Netherlands) T Okker | 1 | 8 | 3

Quarterfinals
(United States) C Graebner | 6 | 4
12 | (United States) D Ralston | 8 | 6

=== Bottom half ===
==== Section 3 ====
First round
10 | (United States) EB Buchholz | 3 | 6 | 6
(United Kingdom) M Cox | 6 | 2 | 3
(Socialist Federal Republic of Yugoslavia) N Pilić | 6 | 6
Q | (West Germany) H-J Plötz | 2 | 2
(Czechoslovakia) J Kodeš | 2 | 8 | 0
(United States) T Gorman | 6 | 6 | 6
Q | (United States) B Seewagen | 2 | 5
7 | (Australia) F Stolle | 6 | 7

Second round
3 | (Australia) J Newcombe | 6 | 6
(Brazil) T Koch | 4 | 4
(United States) J Osborne | 6 | 8 | 8
(Socialist Federal Republic of Yugoslavia) Ž Franulović | 8 | 6 | 6
10 | (United States) EB Buchholz | 6 | 6
(Socialist Federal Republic of Yugoslavia) N Pilić | 2 | 2
(United States) T Gorman | 6 | 6
7 | (Australia) F Stolle | 8 | 8

Third round
3 | (Australia) J Newcombe | 6 | 6 | 7
(United States) J Osborne | 3 | 8 | 5
10 | (United States) EB Buchholz | 6 | 1 | 6
7 | (Australia) F Stolle | 4 | 6 | 3

Quarterfinals
3 | (Australia) J Newcombe | 8 | 3 | 8
10 | (United States) EB Buchholz | 6 | 6 | 6

==== Section 4 ====
First round
8 | (United States) A Ashe | 6 | 6
Q | (Mexico) J Loyo-Mayo | 2 | 1
(Pakistan) H Rahim | 7 | 8
(South Africa) R Moore | 5 | 6
(United States) C Richey | 6 | 3 | 6
(United States) R Holmberg | 4 | 6 | 3
(United States) R Lutz | 3 | 3
(United States) M Riessen | 6 | 6

Second round
8 | (United States) A Ashe | 6 | 8 | 6
(Pakistan) H Rahim | 8 | 6 | 2
(United States) C Richey | 6 | 6
(United States) M Riessen | 4 | 2
11 | (United States) S Smith | 8 | 6
(United States) C Pasarell | 6 | 4
LL | (Jamaica) R Russell | 1 | 3
2 | (Australia) T Roche | 6 | 6

Third round
8 | (United States) A Ashe | 4 | 6 | 6
(United States) C Richey | 6 | 4 | 8
11 | (United States) S Smith | 3 | 2
2 | (Australia) T Roche | 6 | 6

Quarterfinals
(United States) C Richey | 2 | 1
2 | (Australia) T Roche | 6 | 6
