= 1972 U.S. Professional Indoor =

- Date: February 8–13
- Edition: 5th
- Category: World Championship Tennis
- Draw: 32S
- Prize money: $50,000
- Surface: Carpet / indoor
- Location: Philadelphia, PA, United States
- Venue: Spectrum
- Attendance: 57,282

Champions

Singles
- (Australia) Rod Laver

Doubles
- (United States) Arthur Ashe / (United States) Robert Lutz
- U.S. Professional Indoor

The 1972 U.S. Professional Indoor was a men's tennis tournament played on indoor carpet courts. It was played at the Spectrum in Philadelphia, Pennsylvania in the United States that was part of the 1972 World Championship Tennis circuit. It was the fifth edition of the tournament and was held from February 8 through February 13, 1972. Total attendance for the tournament was 57,282. First-seeded Rod Laver won the singles title, his third at the event after 1969 and 1970.

== Finals ==
=== Singles ===
(Australia) Rod Laver defeated (Australia) Ken Rosewall 4–6, 6–2, 6–2, 6–2

- It was Laver's 2nd singles title of the year and the 52nd of his career in the open era.

=== Doubles ===
(United States) Arthur Ashe / (United States) Robert Lutz defeated (Australia) John Newcombe / (Australia) Tony Roche 6–3, 6–7, 6–3

- It was Ashe's 1st title of the year and the 11th of his professional career. It was Lutz's 1st title of the year and the 7th of his professional career.

== See also ==
- Laver–Rosewall rivalry
- 1972 U.S. National Indoor Tennis Championships
- 1972 National Indoor Championships
