= 1985 Ebel U.S. Pro Indoor =

- Date: January 21–28
- Edition: 18th
- Category: Grand Prix (Super Series)
- Draw: 48S / 28D
- Prize money: $ 300,000
- Surface: Carpet / indoor
- Location: Philadelphia, PA, United States
- Venue: Spectrum
- Attendance: 82,648

Champions

Singles
- (United States) John McEnroe

Doubles
- (Sweden) Joakim Nyström / (Sweden) Mats Wilander
- U.S. Pro Indoor

The 1985 Ebel U.S. Pro Indoor was a men's tennis tournament played on indoor carpet courts that was part of the Super Series of the 1985 Nabisco Grand Prix. It was played at the Spectrum in Philadelphia, Pennsylvania in the United States from January 21 to January 28, 1985. First-seeded John McEnroe won his fourth consecutive singles title at the event.

== Finals ==
=== Singles ===
(United States) John McEnroe defeated (Czechoslovakia) Miloslav Mečíř 6–3, 7–6, 6–1

- It was McEnroe's 1st title of the year and the 107th of his career.

=== Doubles ===
(Sweden) Joakim Nyström / (Sweden) Mats Wilander defeated (Poland) Wojciech Fibak / (United States) Sandy Mayer 3–6, 6–2, 6–2

- It was Nyström's 1st title of the year and the 7th of his career. It was Wilander's 1st title of the year and the 19th of his career.

== Prize money ==
Event	W	F	SF	QF	Round of 16	Round of 32	Round of 64
Singles	$54,000	$27,000	$14,100	$7,620	$4,230	$2,400	$1,380
Doubles *	$16,800	$8,400	$4,500	$2,610	$1,620	$1,050	—N/a

_{*per team}
