= 1985 Ebel U.S. Pro Indoor – Doubles =

Doubles
- 1985 Ebel U.S. Pro Indoor

Final
- Champions: (Sweden) Joakim Nyström; (Sweden) Mats Wilander
- Runners-up: (Poland) Wojtek Fibak; (United States) Sandy Mayer
- Score: 3–6, 6–2, 6–2

Details
- Draw: 24
- Seeds: 8

Events
Singles	Doubles
- Ebel U.S. Pro Indoor

Peter Fleming and John McEnroe were the defending champions, but did not participate this year.

Joakim Nyström and Mats Wilander won the title, defeating Wojtek Fibak and Sandy Mayer 3–6, 6–2, 6–2 in the final.

== Seeds ==
All seeds receive a bye into the second round.

1. (Czechoslovakia) Pavel Složil / (Czechoslovakia) Tomáš Šmíd (semifinals)
2. (Switzerland) Heinz Günthardt / (Hungary) Balázs Taróczy (semifinals)
3. (United States) Ken Flach / (United States) Robert Seguso (second round)
4. (Poland) Wojtek Fibak / (United States) Sandy Mayer (final)
5. (United States) Fritz Buehning / (United States) Ferdi Taygan (quarterfinals)
6. (United States) Sherwood Stewart / (Australia) Kim Warwick (second round)
7. (United States) David Dowlen / (Nigeria) Nduka Odizor (quarterfinals)
8. (United States) Gary Donnelly / (United States) Butch Walts (second round)

== Draw ==
Key

- Q = Qualifier
- WC = Wild card
- LL = Lucky loser
- Alt = Alternate
- ITF = ITF entry
- PR = Protected ranking
- SR = Special ranking
- SE = Special exempt
- JE = Junior exempt
- JR = Junior Accelerator Programme entrant
- CO = College Accelerator Programme entrant
- NG = Next Gen Accelerator Program entrant
- w/o = Walkover
- r = Retired
- d = Defaulted

=== Finals ===
Semifinals

Final

1
- (Czechoslovakia) Pavel Složil
- (Czechoslovakia) Tomáš Šmíd
3
4

4
- (Poland) Wojtek Fibak
- (United States) Sandy Mayer
6
6

4
- (Poland) Wojtek Fibak
- (United States) Sandy Mayer
6
2
2

- (Sweden) Joakim Nyström
- (Sweden) Mats Wilander
3
6
6

- (Sweden) Joakim Nyström
- (Sweden) Mats Wilander
7
6

2
- (Switzerland) Heinz Günthardt
- (Hungary) Balázs Taróczy
5
2

=== Top half ===
First round

Second round

Quarterfinals

Semifinals

1
- (Czechoslovakia) P Složil
- (Czechoslovakia) T Šmíd
6
6

- (Israel) S Glickstein
- (Netherlands) M Schapers
2
2

- (Hungary) Z Kuhárszky
- (Brazil) J Soares
4
4

- (Hungary) Z Kuhárszky
- (Brazil) J Soares
6
6

1
- (Czechoslovakia) P Složil
- (Czechoslovakia) T Šmíd
6
6

- (Paraguay) F González
- (Brazil) C Motta
6
6
4

7
- (United States) D Dowlen
- (Nigeria) N Odizor
4
4

- (West Germany) B Becker
- (Sweden) S Edberg
7
4
6

- (West Germany) B Becker
- (Sweden) S Edberg
6
3
4

7
- (United States) D Dowlen
- (Nigeria) N Odizor
3
6
6

1
- (Czechoslovakia) P Složil
- (Czechoslovakia) T Šmíd
3
4

4
- (Poland) W Fibak
- (United States) S Mayer
6
6

4
- (Poland) W Fibak
- (United States) S Mayer
6
6

- (United States) S Davis
- (United States) B Testerman
6
1
2

- (United States) M Davis
- (United States) C Dunk
4
0

- (United States) M Davis
- (United States) C Dunk
4
6
6

4
- (Poland) W Fibak
- (United States) S Mayer
7
6

WC
- (France) T Benhabiles
- (France) Y Noah
4
2

- (United States) M Leach
- (United States) T Wilkison
6
4

- (United States) M Leach
- (United States) T Wilkison
6
6

- (United States) M Leach
- (United States) T Wilkison
6
2
6

6
- (United States) S Stewart
- (Australia) K Warwick
4
6
3

=== Bottom half ===
First round

Second round

Quarterfinals

Semifinals

5
- (United States) F Buehning
- (United States) F Taygan
6
6
7

- (United States) E Fromm
- (United States) R Meyer
3
5

- (United States) S Giammalva Jr.
- (Australia) D Graham
3
7
6

- (United States) S Giammalva Jr.
- (Australia) D Graham
6
7

5
- (United States) F Buehning
- (United States) F Taygan
2
2

- (Sweden) J Nyström
- (Sweden) M Wilander
4
7
6

- (Sweden) J Nyström
- (Sweden) M Wilander
6
6

- (Puerto Rico) E Fernández
- (United States) D Pate
6
6
4

- (Sweden) J Nyström
- (Sweden) M Wilander
7
6

3
- (United States) K Flach
- (United States) R Seguso
5
3

- (Sweden) J Nyström
- (Sweden) M Wilander
7
6

2
- (Switzerland) H Günthardt
- (Hungary) B Taróczy
5
2

8
- (United States) G Donnelly
- (United States) B Walts
6
6

- (United States) Ti Gullikson
- (United States) To Gullikson
6
7

- (United States) Ti Gullikson
- (United States) To Gullikson
7
7

- (United States) C B Cox
- (United States) T Moor
4
6

- (United States) Ti Gullikson
- (United States) To Gullikson
4
4

- (United States) S Meister
- (United States) E Teltscher
6
6
6

2
- (Switzerland) H Günthardt
- (Hungary) B Taróczy
6
6

- (United States) M Dickson
- (United States) J Turpin
7
3
3

- (United States) S Meister
- (United States) E Teltscher
6
4
3

2
- (Switzerland) H Günthardt
- (Hungary) B Taróczy
2
6
6
