= 1968 Philadelphia International Indoor Championships – Singles =

Singles
- 1968 Philadelphia International Indoor Championships

Final
- Champion: (Spain) Manuel Santana
- Runner-up: (Denmark) Jan Leschly
- Score: 8–6, 6–3

Details
- Draw: 12
- Seeds: 4

Events
Singles	Doubles
← 1967 ·	Philadelphia International Indoor Championships	· 1969 →

The event was being held for the first time during the open-era.

Manuel Santana won the title, beating Jan Leschly 8–6, 6–3 in the final.

== Seeds ==
1. (United States) Charlie Pasarell (semifinals)
2. (Spain) Manuel Santana (champion)
3. (United States) Arthur Ashe (semifinals)
4. (Denmark) Jan Leschly (final)

== Draw ==
=== Key ===
- Q = Qualifier
- WC = Wild card
- LL = Lucky loser
- Alt = Alternate
- ITF = ITF entry
- PR = Protected ranking
- SR = Special ranking
- SE = Special exempt
- JE = Junior exempt
- JR = Junior Accelerator Programme entrant
- CO = College Accelerator Programme entrant
- NG = Next Gen Accelerator Program entrant
- w/o = Walkover
- r = Retired
- d = Defaulted

=== Singles draw ===
First round
(Spain) Manuel Orantes
(Brazil) Thomaz Koch	w/o
(United States) Cliff Richey	7	7	6
(Mexico) Rafael Osuna	9	5	4
3	(United States) Arthur Ashe	6	6
Q	(United States) Dick Stockton	2	2
(United States) Jeff Borowiak	7	4
(Denmark) Torben Ulrich	9	6

Quarterfinals
1	(United States) Charlie Pasarell	4	16	6
(Brazil) Thomaz Koch	6	14	2
(United States) Cliff Richey	3	4
4	(Denmark) Jan Leschly	6	6
(Netherlands) Tom Okker	5	9
3	(United States) Arthur Ashe	7	11
(Denmark) Torben Ulrich	1	6	3
2	(Spain) Manuel Santana	6	3	6

Semifinals
1	(United States) Charlie Pasarell	2	5
4	(Denmark) Jan Leschly	6	7
3	(United States) Arthur Ashe	1	3
2	(Spain) Manuel Santana	6	6

Final
4	(Denmark) Jan Leschly	6	3
2	(Spain) Manuel Santana	8	6
