= 1991 U.S. Pro Indoor – Doubles =

Doubles
- 1991 U.S. Pro Indoor

Final
- Champions: (United States) Rick Leach; (United States) Jim Pugh
- Runners-up: (Germany) Udo Riglewski; (Germany) Michael Stich
- Score: 6–4, 6–4

Details
- Draw: 24
- Seeds: 8

Events
Singles	Doubles
- U.S. Pro Indoor

Rick Leach and Jim Pugh were the defending champions.

Leach and Pugh successfully defended their title, defeating Udo Riglewski and Michael Stich 6–4, 6–4 in the final.

== Seeds ==
All seeds receive a bye into the second round.

1. (United States) Scott Davis / (United States) David Pate (quarterfinals)
2. (United States) Rick Leach / (United States) Jim Pugh (champions)
3. (Australia) Darren Cahill / (Australia) Mark Kratzmann (semifinals)
4. (Canada) Grant Connell / (Canada) Glenn Michibata (quarterfinals)
5. (United States) Kelly Jones / (South Africa) Danie Visser (quarterfinals)
6. (United States) Jim Grabb / (United States) Patrick McEnroe (semifinals)
7. (Germany) Udo Riglewski / (Germany) Michael Stich (final)
8. (United Kingdom) Neil Broad / (United States) Kevin Curren (quarterfinals)

== Draw ==
Key

- Q = Qualifier
- WC = Wild card
- LL = Lucky loser
- Alt = Alternate
- ITF = ITF entry
- PR = Protected ranking
- SR = Special ranking
- SE = Special exempt
- JE = Junior exempt
- JR = Junior Accelerator Programme entrant
- CO = College Accelerator Programme entrant
- NG = Next Gen Accelerator Program entrant
- w/o = Walkover
- r = Retired
- d = Defaulted

=== Finals ===
Semifinals

Final

7
- (Germany) Udo Riglewski
- (Germany) Michael Stich
6
4
6

3
- (Australia) Darren Cahill
- (Australia) Mark Kratzmann
4
6
4

7
- (Germany) Udo Riglewski
- (Germany) Michael Stich
4
4

2
- (United States) Rick Leach
- (United States) Jim Pugh
6
6

6
- (United States) Jim Grabb
- (United States) Patrick McEnroe
6
6
3

2
- (United States) Rick Leach
- (United States) Jim Pugh
7
4
6

=== Top half ===
First round

Second round

Quarterfinals

Semifinals

1
- (United States) S Davis
- (United States) D Pate
7
6

- (Spain) T Carbonell
- (The Bahamas) R Smith
7
7

- (Spain) T Carbonell
- (The Bahamas) R Smith
5
3

- (South Africa) G Muller
- (United States) R Seguso
6
6

1
- (United States) S Davis
- (United States) D Pate
5
6
4

- (United States) K Kinnear
- (United States) B Shelton
3
6
4

7
- (Germany) U Riglewski
- (Germany) M Stich
7
3
6

- (United States) K Flach
- (United States) S Melville
6
3
6

- (United States) K Flach
- (United States) S Melville
6
3
2

7
- (Germany) U Riglewski
- (Germany) M Stich
1
6
6

7
- (Germany) U Riglewski
- (Germany) M Stich
6
4
6

3
- (Australia) D Cahill
- (Australia) M Kratzmann
4
6
4

3
- (Australia) D Cahill
- (Australia) M Kratzmann
6
6

- (Argentina) H de la Peña
- (Spain) F Roig
6
4
2

- (Netherlands) P Haarhuis
- (Netherlands) M Koevermans
4
4

- (Netherlands) P Haarhuis
- (Netherlands) M Koevermans
4
6
6

3
- (Australia) D Cahill
- (Australia) M Kratzmann
6
6

- (Czechoslovakia) P Korda
- (Czechoslovakia) C Suk
6
4
6

5
- (United States) K Jones
- (South Africa) D Visser
4
4

- (Australia) B Dyke
- (Australia) L Warder
3
6
7

- (Australia) B Dyke
- (Australia) L Warder
3
2

5
- (United States) K Jones
- (South Africa) D Visser
6
6

=== Bottom half ===
First round

Second round

Quarterfinals

Semifinals

6
- (United States) J Grabb
- (United States) P McEnroe
6
4
6

- (South Africa) S Kruger
- (South Africa) C van Rensburg
6
7

- (South Africa) S Kruger
- (South Africa) C van Rensburg
3
6
1

- (South Africa) W Ferreira
- (South Africa) P Norval
4
6

6
- (United States) J Grabb
- (United States) P McEnroe
6
2
7

- (Australia) W Masur
- (Australia) J Stoltenberg
6
6
6

4
- (Canada) G Connell
- (Canada) G Michibata
4
6
6

- (Australia) J Fitzgerald
- (Sweden) A Järryd
7
3
7

- (Australia) J Fitzgerald
- (Sweden) A Järryd
2
2

4
- (Canada) G Connell
- (Canada) G Michibata
6
6

6
- (United States) J Grabb
- (United States) P McEnroe
6
6
3

2
- (United States) R Leach
- (United States) J Pugh
7
4
6

8
- (United Kingdom) N Broad
- (United States) K Curren
3
7
6

- (United States) B Garrow
- (United States) B Pearce
6
7

- (United States) B Garrow
- (United States) B Pearce
6
6
3

- (United States) J Brown
- (United States) S Salumaa
0
6

8
- (United Kingdom) N Broad
- (United States) K Curren
7
4
6

WC
- (United States) S Bryan
- (United States) T Martin
7
3
2

2
- (United States) R Leach
- (United States) J Pugh
6
6
7

- (Venezuela) A Mora
- (Venezuela) N Pereira
5
6
6

- (Venezuela) A Mora
- (Venezuela) N Pereira
2
4

2
- (United States) R Leach
- (United States) J Pugh
6
6
