= 1992 U.S. Pro Indoor =

- Date: February 17–24
- Edition: 25th
- Category: Championship Series
- Draw: 64S / 32D
- Prize money: $865,000
- Surface: Carpet / indoor
- Location: Philadelphia, PA, United states
- Venue: Spectrum

Champions

Singles
- (United States) Pete Sampras

Doubles
- (Australia) Todd Woodbridge / (Australia) Mark Woodforde
← 1991 ·	U.S. Pro Indoor	· 1993 →

The 1992 U.S. Pro Indoor was a men's tennis tournament played on indoor carpet courts that was part of the Championship Series of the 1992 ATP Tour. It was the 25th edition of the tournament and was played at the Spectrum in Philadelphia, Pennsylvania in the United States from February 17 to February 24, 1992. Second-seeded Pete Sampras won the singles title, his second at the event after 1990.

== Finals ==
=== Singles ===
(United States) Pete Sampras defeated (Israel) Amos Mansdorf 6–1, 7–6^{(7–4)}, 2–6, 7–6^{(7–2)}

- It was Sampras' 1st singles title of the year and the 9th of his career.

=== Doubles ===
(Australia) Todd Woodbridge / (Australia) Mark Woodforde defeated (United States) Jim Grabb / (United States) Richey Reneberg 6–4, 7–6

- It was Woodbridge's 3rd title of the year and the 11th of his career. It was Woodforde's 3rd title of the year and the 14th of his career.
