= 1970 ITPA Open Indoor – Men's doubles =

Men's doubles
- 1970 ITPA Open Indoor

Final
- Champion: (Romania) Ilie Năstase (Romania) Ion Țiriac
- Runner-up: (United States) Arthur Ashe (United States) Dennis Ralston
- Score: 6–4, 6–3

Events
Singles	Doubles
- ITPA Open Indoor

Tom Okker and Marty Riessen were the defending champions, but lost in the second round this year.

Ilie Năstase and Ion Țiriac successfully defended their title, defeating Arthur Ashe and Dennis Ralston 6–4, 6–3 in the final.

== Seeds ==
1. (Australia) John Newcombe / (Australia) Tony Roche (second round)
2. (Netherlands) Tom Okker / (United States) Marty Riessen (second round)
3. (United States) Robert Lutz / (United States) Stan Smith (second round)
4. (Australia) Ken Rosewall / (Australia) Fred Stolle (first round)

== Draw ==
Key

- Q = Qualifier
- WC = Wild card
- LL = Lucky loser
- Alt = Alternate
- ITF = ITF entry
- PR = Protected ranking
- SR = Special ranking
- SE = Special exempt
- JE = Junior exempt
- JR = Junior Accelerator Programme entrant
- CO = College Accelerator Programme entrant
- NG = Next Gen Accelerator Program entrant
- w/o = Walkover
- r = Retired
- d = Defaulted

=== Finals ===
Semifinals
(United States) Jim McManus (United States) Jim Osborne	1	3
(Romania) Ilie Năstase (Romania) Ion Țiriac	6	6
(United States) Arthur Ashe (United States) Dennis Ralston	7	4	6
(Spain) Andrés Gimeno (Spain) Manuel Santana	5	6	3

Final
(Romania) Ilie Năstase (Romania) Ion Țiriac	6	6
(United States) Arthur Ashe (United States) Dennis Ralston	4	3

=== Top half ===
First round
(Romania) I Năstase (Romania) I Țiriac	6	6
(United States) J Borowiak (Pakistan) H Rahim	4	4
(United States) C Richey (United Kingdom) R Taylor	6	2	6
(United Kingdom) M Cox (United Kingdom) G Stilwell	2	6	4
(United States) R Barth (United States) T Gorman	6	6
(United States) Donald Lutz (United States) B Martin	1	1
(Brazil) T Koch (India) P Lall	7	5	5
4	(Australia) K Rosewall (Australia) F Stolle	5	7	3

Second round
2	(Netherlands) T Okker (United States) M Riessen	4	6	4
(United States) J McManus (United States) J Osborne	6	2	5
(United States) EB Buchholz (South Africa) R Moore	4	6	5
(United Kingdom) G Battrick (Australia) B Carmichael	6	4	3
(Romania) I Năstase (Romania) I Țiriac	6	4	5
(United States) C Richey (United Kingdom) R Taylor	3	6	4
(United States) R Barth (United States) T Gorman	5	7	2
(Brazil) T Koch (India) P Lall	7	5	5

Quarterfinals
(United States) J McManus (United States) J Osborne	6	5	6
(United States) EB Buchholz (South Africa) R Moore	2	7	1
(Romania) I Năstase (Romania) I Țiriac	6	4	6
(Brazil) T Koch (India) P Lall	3	6	4

Semifinals
(United States) J McManus (United States) J Osborne	1	3
(Romania) I Năstase (Romania) I Țiriac	6	6

=== Bottom half ===
First round
3	(United States) R Lutz (United States) S Smith	6	6
(West Germany) H-J Plötz (Jamaica) R Russell	2	1
(United States) A Ashe (United States) D Ralston	7	6
(United Arab Republic) I El Shafei (Denmark) T Ulrich	5	3
(West Germany) I Buding (Chile) J Fillol	4	6	5
(Socialist Federal Republic of Yugoslavia) Ž Franulović (Socialist Federal Republic of Yugoslavia) N Pilić	6	3	3

Second round
3	(United States) R Lutz (United States) S Smith	4	3
(United States) A Ashe (United States) D Ralston	6	6
(West Germany) I Buding (Chile) J Fillol	1	4
(Australia) R Emerson (Australia) R Laver	6	6
(United States) C Graebner (United States) R Holmberg	5	5
(Spain) A Gimeno (Spain) M Santana	7	7
(Czechoslovakia) J Kodeš (Mexico) J Loyo-Mayo	7	3	5
1	(Australia) J Newcombe (Australia) T Roche	5	6	4

Quarterfinals
(United States) A Ashe (United States) D Ralston	7	6
(Australia) R Emerson (Australia) R Laver	5	4
(Spain) A Gimeno (Spain) M Santana	6	5	6
(Czechoslovakia) J Kodeš (Mexico) J Loyo-Mayo	3	7	3

Semifinals
(United States) A Ashe (United States) D Ralston	7	4	6
(Spain) A Gimeno (Spain) M Santana	5	6	3
