= 1980 U.S. Pro Indoor – Doubles =

Doubles
- 1980 U.S. Pro Indoor

Final
- Champions: (United States) Peter Fleming (United States) John McEnroe
- Runners-up: (United States) Brian Gottfried (Mexico) Raúl Ramírez
- Score: 6–3, 7–6

Details
- Draw: 24
- Seeds: 8

Events
Singles	Doubles
- U.S. Pro Indoor

Wojtek Fibak and Tom Okker were the defending champions, but Okker did not participate this year. Fibak partnered Heinz Günthardt, losing in the semifinals.

Peter Fleming and John McEnroe won the title, defeating Brian Gottfried and Raúl Ramírez 6–3, 7–6 in the final.

== Seeds ==
1. (United States) Peter Fleming / (United States) John McEnroe (champions)
2. (United States) Marty Riessen / (United States) Sherwood Stewart (second round)
3. (United States) Gene Mayer / (United States) Stan Smith (first round)
4. (South Africa) Bob Hewitt / (South Africa) Frew McMillan (second round)
5. (United States) Brian Gottfried / (Mexico) Raúl Ramírez (final)
6. (Poland) Wojtek Fibak / (Switzerland) Heinz Günthardt (semifinals)
7. N/A
8. (Argentina) José-Luis Clerc / (Romania) Ilie Năstase (second round)

== Draw ==
Key

- Q = Qualifier
- WC = Wild card
- LL = Lucky loser
- Alt = Alternate
- ITF = ITF entry
- PR = Protected ranking
- SR = Special ranking
- SE = Special exempt
- JE = Junior exempt
- JR = Junior Accelerator Programme entrant
- CO = College Accelerator Programme entrant
- NG = Next Gen Accelerator Program entrant
- w/o = Walkover
- r = Retired
- d = Defaulted

=== Finals ===
Semifinals
1	(United States) Peter Fleming (United States) John McEnroe	6	7	7
6	(Poland) Wojtek Fibak (Switzerland) Heinz Günthardt	7	6	6
5	(United States) Brian Gottfried (Mexico) Raúl Ramírez	7	5	6
(United States) Terry Moor (Hungary) Balázs Taróczy	6	7	4

Final
1	(United States) Peter Fleming (United States) John McEnroe	6	7
5	(United States) Brian Gottfried (Mexico) Raúl Ramírez	3	6

=== Top half ===
First round
(South Africa) J Kriek (France) Y Noah	4	6	7
(United States) J Sadri (United States) T Wilkison	6	4	5
(Australia) J James (Australia) C Kachel	w/o
(India) A Amritraj (India) V Amritraj
4	(South Africa) B Hewitt (South Africa) F McMillan	6	6	6
(United States) F McNair (United States) M Mitchell	7	2	3
(Australia) P Kronk (United States) B Teacher	3	7	3
6	(Poland) W Fibak (Switzerland) H Günthardt	6	6	6

Second round
1	(United States) P Fleming (United States) J McEnroe	5	6	6
(South Africa) J Kriek (France) Y Noah	7	2	3
(Australia) J James (Australia) C Kachel	3	4
LL	(Israel) S Krulevitz (United States) F Taygan	6	6
4	(South Africa) B Hewitt (South Africa) F McMillan	6	1	3
(United States) B Martin (United States) E Teltscher	4	6	6
(United States) J Bailey (United States) B Kleege	3	3
6	(Poland) W Fibak (Switzerland) H Günthardt	6	6

Quarterfinals
1	(United States) P Fleming (United States) J McEnroe	7	6
LL	(Israel) S Krulevitz (United States) F Taygan	5	3
(United States) B Martin (United States) E Teltscher	4	3
6	(Poland) W Fibak (Switzerland) H Günthardt	6	6

Semifinals
1	(United States) P Fleming (United States) J McEnroe	6	7	7
6	(Poland) W Fibak (Switzerland) H Günthardt	7	6	6

=== Bottom half ===
First round
(United States) S Denton (United States) J Turpin	4	3
(Australia) R Case (Australia) G Masters	6	6
(United States) B Manson (United States) A Pattison	7	7
3	(United States) G Mayer (United States) S Smith	6	5
(United States) V Amaya (United States) H Pfister	3	7	6
(France) D Bedel (France) G Moretton	6	6	3
(United States) T Moor (Hungary) B Taróczy	7	6
(United States) D Stockton (United States) E van Dillen	6	4

Second round
5	(United States) B Gottfried (Mexico) R Ramírez	6	7	6
(Australia) R Case (Australia) G Masters	7	6	4
(United States) V Gerulaitis (Australia) F Stolle	6	6
(United States) B Manson (United States) A Pattison	4	2
8	(Argentina) J-L Clerc (Romania) I Năstase	6	6	3
(United States) V Amaya (United States) H Pfister	7	4	6
(United States) T Moor (Hungary) B Taróczy	7	7
2	(United States) M Riessen (United States) S Stewart	6	6

Quarterfinals
5	(United States) B Gottfried (Mexico) R Ramírez	7	6
(United States) V Gerulaitis (Australia) F Stolle	5	3
(United States) V Amaya (United States) H Pfister	2	4
(United States) T Moor (Hungary) B Taróczy	6	6

Semifinals
5	(United States) B Gottfried (Mexico) R Ramírez	7	5	6
(United States) T Moor (Hungary) B Taróczy	6	7	4
