= 1994 Comcast U.S. Indoor – Doubles =

Doubles
- 1994 Comcast U.S. Indoor

Final
- Champions: (Netherlands) Jacco Eltingh (Netherlands) Paul Haarhuis
- Runners-up: (United States) Jim Grabb (United States) Jared Palmer
- Score: 6–3, 6–4

Events
Singles	Doubles
← 1993 ·	Comcast U.S. Indoor	· 1995 →

Jim Grabb and Richey Reneberg were the defending champions, but Reneberg did not participate this year. Grabb partnered Jared Palmer, finishing runner-up.

Jacco Eltingh and Paul Haarhuis won the title, defeating Grabb and Palmer 6–3, 6–4 in the final.

== Seeds ==
1. (Zimbabwe) Byron Black / (United States) Jonathan Stark (quarterfinals)
2. (Netherlands) Jacco Eltingh / (Netherlands) Paul Haarhuis (champions)
3. (United States) Luke Jensen / (United States) Murphy Jensen (first round)
4. (United States) Steve DeVries / (Australia) David Macpherson (quarterfinals)

== Draw ==
=== Key ===
- Q = Qualifier
- WC = Wild card
- LL = Lucky loser
- Alt = Alternate
- SE = Special exempt
- PR = Protected ranking
- ITF = ITF entry
- JE = Junior exempt
- w/o = Walkover
- r = Retired
- d = Defaulted
- SR = Special ranking

=== Draw ===
First round
1	(Zimbabwe) B Black (United States) J Stark	6	4	6
(South Africa) J-L de Jager (South Africa) D Visser	3	6	3
(United States) P Annacone (United States) P McEnroe	1	4
WC	(United States) J Courier (Switzerland) J Hlasek	6	6
4	(United States) S DeVries (Australia) D Macpherson	6	6
Q	(Belgium) X Daufresne (Belgium) F Dewulf	1	4
(Mexico) J Lozano (United States) J Pugh	6	2	0
(United States) J Grabb (United States) J Palmer	4	6	6
(United States) M Bauer (United States) G Van Emburgh	6	7
WC	(United States) D DiLucia (United States) I Lendl	3	6
(United States) S Cannon (South Africa) B Talbot	6	6
3	(United States) L Jensen (United States) M Jensen	4	4
(United States) T Kronemann (Australia) L Warder	3	6
(United States) M Keil (United States) D Pate	6	7
(United States) S Davis (Canada) S Lareau	4	7	6
2	(Netherlands) J Eltingh (Netherlands) P Haarhuis	6	6	7

Quarterfinals
1	(Zimbabwe) B Black (United States) J Stark	6	4
WC	(United States) J Courier (Switzerland) J Hlasek	7	6
4	(United States) S DeVries (Australia) D Macpherson	2	2
(United States) J Grabb (United States) J Palmer	6	6
(United States) M Bauer (United States) G Van Emburgh	3	3
(United States) S Cannon (South Africa) B Talbot	6	6
(United States) M Keil (United States) D Pate	2	1
2	(Netherlands) J Eltingh (Netherlands) P Haarhuis	6	6

Semifinals
WC	(United States) J Courier (Switzerland) J Hlasek	4	6
(United States) J Grabb (United States) J Palmer	6	7
(United States) S Cannon (South Africa) B Talbot	6	6
2	(Netherlands) J Eltingh (Netherlands) P Haarhuis	7	7

Final
(United States) J Grabb (United States) J Palmer	3	4
2	(Netherlands) J Eltingh (Netherlands) P Haarhuis	6	6
