= 1992 U.S. Pro Indoor – Singles =

Singles
- 1992 U.S. Pro Indoor

Final
- Champion: (United States) Pete Sampras
- Runner-up: (Israel) Amos Mansdorf
- Score: 6–1, 7–6^{(7–4)}, 2–6, 7–6^{(7–2)}

Details
- Draw: 48
- Seeds: 16

Events
Singles	Doubles
← 1991 ·	U.S. Pro Indoor	· 1993 →

Ivan Lendl was the defending champion, but did not participate this year.

Pete Sampras won the title, defeating Amos Mansdorf, 6–1, 7–6^{(7–4)}, 2–6, 7–6^{(7–2)} in the final.

== Seeds ==
1. (Germany) Michael Stich (third round)
2. (United States) Pete Sampras (champion)
3. (United States) Michael Chang (second round)
4. (United States) David Wheaton (third round)
5. (United States) Derrick Rostagno (third round)
6. (United States) Brad Gilbert (semifinals)
7. (South Africa) Wayne Ferreira (third round)
8. (United States) Richey Reneberg (second round)
9. (Commonwealth of Independent States) Andrei Chesnokov (second round)
10. (United States) Aaron Krickstein (quarterfinals)
11. (Spain) Francisco Clavet (semifinals)
12. (Austria) Horst Skoff (second round)
13. (United States) MaliVai Washington (second round)
14. (Netherlands) Paul Haarhuis (quarterfinals)
15. (Italy) Stefano Pescosolido (third round)
16. (Israel) Amos Mansdorf (final)

== Draw ==
=== Key ===
- Q = Qualifier
- WC = Wild card
- LL = Lucky loser
- Alt = Alternate
- SE = Special exempt
- PR = Protected ranking
- ITF = ITF entry
- JE = Junior exempt
- w/o = Walkover
- r = Retired
- d = Defaulted
- SR = Special ranking

=== Finals ===
Semifinals
16	(Israel) Amos Mansdorf	5	6	6
11	(Spain) Francisco Clavet	7	3	2
6	(United States) Brad Gilbert	4	3
2	(United States) Pete Sampras	6	6

Final
16	(Israel) Amos Mansdorf	1	6^{4}	6	6^{2}
2	(United States) Pete Sampras	6	7^{7}	2	7^{7}

=== Top half ===
==== Section 1 ====
First round
(Netherlands) M Schapers	6	6
WC	(United States) T Mayotte	3	4
(Australia) M Woodforde	4	5
(South Africa) C van Rensburg	6	7
WC	(United States) P Annacone	7^{7}	1	3
(United States) J Tarango	6^{4}	6	6
(Japan) S Matsuoka	7^{7}	4	5
Q	(Canada) C Pridham	6^{4}	6	6

Second round
1	(Germany) M Stich	7^{7}	6
(Netherlands) M Schapers	6^{2}	3
(South Africa) C van Rensburg	4	3
16	(Israel) A Mansdorf	6	6
9	(Commonwealth of Independent States) A Chesnokov	6	4	1
(United States) J Tarango	3	6	6
Q	(Canada) C Pridham	4	4
7	(South Africa) W Ferreira	6	6

Third round
1	(Germany) M Stich	6^{5}	5
16	(Israel) A Mansdorf	7^{7}	7
(United States) J Tarango	6	7
7	(South Africa) W Ferreira	3	5

Quarterfinals
16	(Israel) A Mansdorf	6	6
(United States) J Tarango	3	0

==== Section 2 ====
First round
(United States) J Grabb	6	7^{8}
(United States) B Shelton	3	6^{6}
(Australia) T Woodbridge	7^{7}	6
(Canada) G Connell	6^{5}	4
(Australia) W Masur	6	6
(Australia) J Stoltenberg	4	1
(Italy) R Furlan	7	6
(Italy) G Pozzi	5	3

Second round
3	(United States) M Chang	3	6	2
(United States) J Grabb	6	3	6
(Australia) T Woodbridge	6	5	7^{7}
13	(United States) M Washington	1	7	6^{3}
11	(Spain) F Clavet	6^{5}	6	7^{7}
(Australia) W Masur	7^{7}	3	6^{3}
(Italy) R Furlan	7	3	3
5	(United States) D Rostagno	5	6	6

Third round
(United States) J Grabb	7^{7}	6
(Australia) T Woodbridge	6^{3}	4
11	(Spain) F Clavet	7^{7}	7^{7}
5	(United States) D Rostagno	6^{4}	6^{5}

Quarterfinals
(United States) J Grabb	6	5	3
11	(Spain) F Clavet	2	7	6

==== Section 3 ====
First round
Q	(United States) G Layendecker	3	6	6
Q	(France) S Simian	6	4	2
(Argentina) G Markus	2	5
Q	(Canada) M Laurendeau	6	7
Q	(Australia) R Fromberg	4	5
(Italy) C Caratti	6	7
(Germany) M Zoecke	6	6
Q	(Mexico) L Lavalle	1	4

Second round
6	(United States) B Gilbert	6	6
Q	(United States) G Layendecker	2	4
Q	(Canada) M Laurendeau	6	6
12	(Austria) H Skoff	3	4
14	(Netherlands) P Haarhuis	7^{7}	6
(Italy) C Caratti	6^{0}	4
(Germany) M Zoecke	4	6	4
4	(United States) D Wheaton	6	3	6

Third round
6	(United States) B Gilbert	6	6
Q	(Canada) M Laurendeau	4	3
14	(Netherlands) P Haarhuis	6	7^{8}
4	(United States) D Wheaton	3	6^{6}

Quarterfinals
6	(United States) B Gilbert	6	3	6
14	(Netherlands) P Haarhuis	3	6	1

==== Section 4 ====
First round
(Germany) P Baur	5	7^{8}	4
(France) R Gilbert	7	6^{6}	6
WC	(United States) T Martin	6	3	6
(Germany) C Saceanu	3	6	3
(Haiti) R Agénor	4	6^{2}
(France) A Boetsch	6	7^{7}
WC	(United States) D DiLucia	7	3	6
(United States) K Curren	5	6	4

Second round
8	(United States) R Reneberg	4	2
(France) R Gilbert	6	6
WC	(United States) T Martin	6	4	3
10	(United States) A Krickstein	3	6	6
15	(Italy) S Pescosolido	7	6
(France) A Boetsch	5	4
WC	(United States) D DiLucia	2	1
2	(United States) P Sampras	6	6

Third round
(France) R Gilbert	6	6^{3}	5
10	(United States) A Krickstein	3	7^{7}	7
15	(Italy) S Pescosolido	6^{0}	6	4
2	(United States) P Sampras	7^{7}	4	6

Quarterfinals
10	(United States) A Krickstein	6	6^{5}	6^{7}
2	(United States) P Sampras	3	7^{7}	7^{9}
