= 1985 Ebel U.S. Pro Indoor – Singles =

Singles
- 1985 Ebel U.S. Pro Indoor

Final
- Champion: (United States) John McEnroe
- Runner-up: (Czechoslovakia) Miloslav Mečíř
- Score: 6–3, 7–6, 6–1

Details
- Draw: 48
- Seeds: 16

Events
Singles	Doubles
- U.S. Pro Indoor

John McEnroe successfully defended the singles title at the U.S. Pro Indoor for a third tournament in a row, defeating Miloslav Mečíř in the final in three straight sets.

== Seeds ==
1. (United States) John McEnroe (champion)
2. (United States) Jimmy Connors (semifinals)
3. (Sweden) Mats Wilander (second round)
4. (United States) Eliot Teltscher (quarterfinals)
5. (France) Yannick Noah (quarterfinals)
6. (Sweden) Joakim Nyström (second round)
7. (United States) Jimmy Arias (second round)
8. (South Africa) ~~Kevin Curren~~ (withdrew)
9. (Czechoslovakia) Tomáš Šmíd (third round)
10. (Sweden) Stefan Edberg (third round)
11. (United States) Ben Testerman (third round)
12. (United States) Brad Gilbert (third round)
13. (India) Ramesh Krishnan (third round)
14. N/A
15. (United States) John Sadri (second round)
16. (United States) David Pate (second round)

== Draw ==
Key

- Q = Qualifier
- WC = Wild card
- LL = Lucky loser
- Alt = Alternate
- ITF = ITF entry
- PR = Protected ranking
- SR = Special ranking
- SE = Special exempt
- JE = Junior exempt
- JR = Junior Accelerator Programme entrant
- CO = College Accelerator Programme entrant
- NG = Next Gen Accelerator Program entrant
- w/o = Walkover
- r = Retired
- d = Defaulted

=== Final ===
Quarter-finals
1	(United States) John McEnroe	6	6
5	(France) Yannick Noah	2	4
4	(United States) Eliot Teltscher	3	2
(United States) Scott Davis	6	6
(Czechoslovakia) Miloslav Mečíř	7	7
Q	(Brazil) João Soares	5	5
(United States) Mel Purcell	4	6
2	(United States) Jimmy Connors	6	7

Semi-finals
1	(United States) John McEnroe	6	6
(United States) Scott Davis	2	4
(Czechoslovakia) Miloslav Mečíř	5	6	6
2	(United States) Jimmy Connors	7	4	3

Final
1	(United States) John McEnroe	6	7	6
(Czechoslovakia) Miloslav Mečíř	3	6	1

=== Top half ===
==== Section 1 ====
First round
(United States) T Moor	4	3
(United States) M Davis	6	6
Q	(United States) S Giammalava	6	6
WC	(Israel) S Perkiss	0	1
WC	(Israel) S Glickstein	3	3
(Poland) W Fibak	6	6
(United States) M Dickson	3	1
WC	(United States) S Mayer	6	6

Second round
1	(United States) J McEnroe	6	6
(United States) M Davis	2	3
Q	(United States) S Giammalava	4	6
12	(United States) B Gilbert	6	7
LL	(Brazil) C Motta	6	4	6
(Poland) W Fibak	3	6	3
WC	(United States) S Mayer	4	7	6
5	(France) Y Noah	6	5	7

Third round
1	(United States) J McEnroe	6	6
12	(United States) B Gilbert	1	2
LL	(Brazil) C Motta	1	2
5	(France) Y Noah	6	6

Quarterfinals
1	(United States) J McEnroe	6	6
5	(France) Y Noah	2	4

==== Section 2 ====
First round
(United States) J Lapidus	2	6	6
(United States) T Gullikson	6	4	3
Q	(United States) S Denton	3	2
(United States) T Mayotte	6	6
(United States) M Mitchell	6	3	6
(Switzerland) H Günthardt	4	6	3
(United States) S Davis	6	6	7
Q	(United States) R Brown	7	3	6

Second round
4	(United States) E Teltscher	6	6
(United States) J Lapidus	4	2
(United States) T Mayotte	6	6
15	(United States) J Sadri	3	4
9	(Czechoslovakia) T Šmid	6	3	6
(United States) M Mitchell	2	6	2
(United States) S Davis	6	4	6
LL	(Netherlands) M Schapers	3	6	1

Third round
4	(United States) E Teltscher	1	7	6
(United States) T Mayotte	6	6	3
9	(Czechoslovakia) T Šmid	4	3
(United States) S Davis	6	6

Quarterfinals
4	(United States) E Teltscher	3	2
(United States) S Davis	6	6

=== Bottom half ===
==== Section 1 ====
First round
(Czechoslovakia) M Mečíř	7	7
(France) T Tulasne	5	6
(Hungary) B Taróczy	6	7	7
(United States) B Green	7	6	5
Q	(Brazil) J Soares	6	4	6
(United States) T Wilkison	4	6	1
(France) T Benhabiles	6	2
(United States) G Holmes	7	6

Second round
6	(Sweden) J Nyström	3	7	1
(Czechoslovakia) M Mečíř	6	6	6
(Hungary) B Taróczy	3	3
13	(India) R Krishnan	6	6
16	(United States) D Pate	3	6
Q	(Brazil) J Soares	6	7
(United States) G Holmes	6	6
3	(Sweden) M Wilander	4	3

Third round
(Czechoslovakia) M Mečíř	7	3	6
13	(India) R Krishnan	6	6	4
Q	(Brazil) J Soares	6	5	6
(United States) G Holmes	3	7	1

Quarterfinals
(Czechoslovakia) M Mečíř	7	7
Q	(Brazil) J Soares	5	5

==== Section 2 ====
First round
(United States) M Purcell	4	7	6
Q	(Socialist Federal Republic of Yugoslavia) M Ostoja	6	6	4
(Czechoslovakia) P Složil	7	6
Q	(United States) T Nelson	6	2
(West Germany) B Becker	6	6	6
(Hungary) Z Kuharszky	7	4	2
(United States) L Shiras	6	4	6
WC	(United States) T Gullikson	2	6	4

Second round
7	(United States) J Arias	7	4	4
(United States) M Purcell	6	6	6
(Czechoslovakia) P Složil	6	2	6
11	(United States) B Testerman	2	6	7
10	(Sweden) S Edberg	6	6
(West Germany) B Becker	3	1
(United States) L Shiras	2	4
2	(United States) J Connors	6	6

Third round
(United States) M Purcell	7	3	6
4	(United States) B Testerman	6	6	4
10	(Sweden) S Edberg	6	2
2	(United States) J Connors	7	7

Quarterfinals
(United States) M Purcell	4	6
2	(United States) J Connors	6	7
