= 1975 U.S. Pro Indoor – Doubles =

Doubles
- 1975 U.S. Pro Indoor

Final
- Champions: (United States) Brian Gottfried (Mexico) Raúl Ramírez
- Runners-up: (United States) Dick Stockton (United States) Erik van Dillen
- Score: 3–6, 6–3, 7–6^{(7–4)}

Details
- Draw: 42
- Seeds: 8

Events
Singles	Doubles
- U.S. Pro Indoor

Pat Cramer and Mike Estep were the defending champions, but Cramer did not participate this year. Estep partnered Russell Simpson, losing in the second round.

Brian Gottfried and Raúl Ramírez won the title, defeating Dick Stockton and Erik van Dillen 3–6, 6–3, 7–6^{(7–4)} in the final.

== Seeds ==
1. (South Africa) Bob Hewitt / (South Africa) Frew McMillan (quarterfinals)
2. (United States) Robert Lutz / (United States) Stan Smith (quarterfinals)
3. (Australia) Roy Emerson / (Australia) Rod Laver (third round)
4. (United States) Brian Gottfried / (Mexico) Raúl Ramírez (champions)
5. (Australia) Ross Case / (Australia) Geoff Masters (semifinals)
6. (Chile) Patricio Cornejo / (Chile) Jaime Fillol (first round, withdrew)
7. (Australia) John Alexander / (Australia) Phil Dent (semifinals)
8. (India) Anand Amritraj / (India) Vijay Amritraj (first round)

== Draw ==
Key

- Q = Qualifier
- WC = Wild card
- LL = Lucky loser
- Alt = Alternate
- ITF = ITF entry
- PR = Protected ranking
- SR = Special ranking
- SE = Special exempt
- JE = Junior exempt
- JR = Junior Accelerator Programme entrant
- CO = College Accelerator Programme entrant
- NG = Next Gen Accelerator Program entrant
- w/o = Walkover
- r = Retired
- d = Defaulted

=== Finals ===
Semifinals
5	(Australia) Ross Case (Australia) Geoff Masters	7^{7}	6^{3}	6^{2}
(United States) Dick Stockton (United States) Erik van Dillen	6^{5}	7^{7}	7^{7}
4	(United States) Brian Gottfried (Mexico) Raúl Ramírez	6	6
7	(Australia) John Alexander (Australia) Phil Dent	4	1

Final
(United States) Dick Stockton (United States) Erik van Dillen	6	3	6^{4}
4	(United States) Brian Gottfried (Mexico) Raúl Ramírez	3	6	7^{7}

=== Top half ===
==== Section 1 ====
First round

Second round
1	(South Africa) B Hewitt (South Africa) F McMillan	w/o
(Spain) J Higueras (Hungary) B Taróczy
(Japan) J Kamiwazumi (United States) C Richey	7^{8}	7^{7}
(United States) P Gerken (Pakistan) H Rahim	6^{6}	6^{1}
5	(Australia) R Case (Australia) G Masters	6	6^{5}	6
(Australia) T Roche (Australia) A Stone	3	7^{7}	4
(Italy) P Bertolucci (Italy) A Panatta	3	6	7^{7}
(Soviet Union) T Kakoulia (Soviet Union) A Metreveli	6	3	6^{2}

Third round
1	(South Africa) B Hewitt (South Africa) F McMillan	6	6
(Japan) J Kamiwazumi (United States) C Richey	1	2
5	(Australia) R Case (Australia) G Masters	6	6
(Italy) P Bertolucci (Italy) A Panatta	3	4

Quarterfinals
1	(South Africa) B Hewitt (South Africa) F McMillan	4	2
5	(Australia) R Case (Australia) G Masters	6	6

==== Section 2 ====
First round
(United States) C Pasarell (United States) R Tanner	6	6^{6}	6
(South Africa) R Moore (United States) A Pattison	4	7^{8}	2
6	(Chile) P Cornejo (Chile) J Fillol
(United States) D Stockton (United States) E van Dillen	w/o
(United States) T Gorman (United States) M Riessen	w/o
(Czechoslovakia) J Hřebec (Czechoslovakia) V Zedník
(France) P Barthès (France) P Dominguez
(United States) E Dibbs (United States) H Solomon	w/o
(Sweden) K Johansson (Austria) H Kary	w/o
(Sweden) B Borg (Argentina) G Vilas

Second round
3	(Australia) R Emerson (Australia) R Laver	6	6
(United States) T Edlefsen (Czechoslovakia) M Holeček	0	3
(United States) V Gerulaitis (United States) S Mayer	4	3
(United States) C Pasarell (United States) R Tanner	6	6
(United States) D Stockton (United States) E van Dillen	6	6	6
(United States) T Gorman (United States) M Riessen	7	4	2
(United States) E Dibbs (United States) H Solomon	6	6
(Sweden) K Johansson (Austria) H Kary	4	3

Third round
3	(Australia) R Emerson (Australia) R Laver	6	3	5
(United States) C Pasarell (United States) R Tanner	4	6	7
(United States) D Stockton (United States) E van Dillen	3	6	6
(United States) E Dibbs (United States) H Solomon	6	2	2

Quarterfinals
(United States) C Pasarell (United States) R Tanner	6^{4}	7^{8}	4
(United States) D Stockton (United States) E van Dillen	7^{7}	6^{6}	6

=== Bottom half ===
==== Section 3 ====
First round
(United States) D Dell (United States) S Stewart	w/o
(Socialist Federal Republic of Yugoslavia) Ž Franulović (Socialist Federal Republic of Yugoslavia) N Pilić
(United States) A Ashe (Netherlands) T Okker	6	7^{7}
(Israel) S Krulevitz (United Kingdom) J Lloyd	3	6^{3}
(Egypt) I El Shafei (New Zealand) B Fairlie	w/o
(United States) J Borowiak (Brazil) T Koch
(Australia) C Dibley (Australia) R Ruffels	6	4	6
8	(India) A Amritraj (India) A Amritraj	2	6	4
(Australia) D Crealy (New Zealand) O Parun	w/o
(Australia) B Phillips-Moore (United States) R Reid

Second round
(United States) D Dell (United States) S Stewart	7	6	4
(United States) A Ashe (Netherlands) T Okker	5	7	6
(Egypt) I El Shafei (New Zealand) B Fairlie	6	3
(Australia) C Dibley (Australia) R Ruffels	7	6
(Australia) D Crealy (New Zealand) O Parun	w/o
(Italy) C Barazzutti (Italy) A Zugarelli
(Australia) S Ball (Australia) B Giltinan	1	3
4	(United States) B Gottfried (Mexico) R Ramírez	6	6

Third round
(United States) A Ashe (Netherlands) T Okker	6^{6}	3
(Australia) C Dibley (Australia) R Ruffels	7^{8}	6
(Australia) D Crealy (New Zealand) O Parun	1	3
4	(United States) B Gottfried (Mexico) R Ramírez	6	6

Quarterfinals
(Australia) C Dibley (Australia) R Ruffels	6	4	4
4	(United States) B Gottfried (Mexico) R Ramírez	2	6	6

==== Section 4 ====
First round

Second round
(United Kingdom) B Mottram (West Germany) HJ Pohmann	7	6
(United Kingdom) G Battrick (United Kingdom) G Stilwell	5	0
(South Africa) R Maud (Colombia) I Molina	4	4
7	(Australia) J Alexander (Australia) P Dent	6	6
(United States) M Estep (New Zealand) R Simpson	3	4
(United Kingdom) M Cox (United Kingdom) R Drysdale	6	6
(Sweden) ON Bengtson (United States) J McManus	3	3
2	(United States) R Lutz (United States) S Smith	6	6

Third round
(United Kingdom) B Mottram (West Germany) HJ Pohmann	7^{8}	2	4
7	(Australia) J Alexander (Australia) P Dent	6^{6}	6	6
(United Kingdom) M Cox (United Kingdom) R Drysdale	3	3
2	(United States) R Lutz (United States) S Smith	6	6

Quarterfinals
7	(Australia) J Alexander (Australia) P Dent	6^{6}	6	7^{7}
2	(United States) R Lutz (United States) S Smith	7^{8}	4	6^{4}
