= 1973 U.S. Professional Indoor – Singles =

Singles
- 1973 U.S. Professional Indoor

Final
- Champion: (United States) Stan Smith
- Runner-up: (United States) Robert Lutz
- Score: 7–6^{(7–2)}, 7–6^{(7–5)}, 4–6, 6–4

Details
- Draw: 32
- Seeds: 12

Events
Singles	Doubles
← 1972 ·	U.S. Professional Indoor	· 1974 →

Rod Laver was the defending champion, but lost in the quarterfinals this year.

Stan Smith won the title, defeating Robert Lutz 7–6^{(7–2)}, 7–6^{(7–5)}, 4–6, 6–4 in the final.

== Seeds ==
1. (Australia) Rod Laver (quarterfinals)
2. (Australia) Colin Dibley (quarterfinals)
3. (United States) Stan Smith (champion)
4. (United States) Dick Stockton (quarterfinals)
5. (Australia) John Alexander (first round)
6. (Australia) Roy Emerson (second round)
7. (United States) Robert Lutz (final)
8. (United States) Cliff Richey (quarterfinals)
9. (Australia) Allan Stone (first round)
10. (Australia) Phil Dent (second round)
11. (United States) Harold Solomon (second round)
12. (United States) Tom Edlefsen (first round)

== Draw ==
=== Key ===
- Q = Qualifier
- WC = Wild card
- LL = Lucky loser
- Alt = Alternate
- SE = Special exempt
- PR = Protected ranking
- ITF = ITF entry
- JE = Junior exempt
- w/o = Walkover
- r = Retired
- d = Defaulted
- SR = Special ranking

=== Finals ===
Semifinals
(Socialist Federal Republic of Yugoslavia) Nikola Pilić	4	4	7	3
7	(United States) Robert Lutz	6	6	5	6
3	(United States) Stan Smith	6	6	6
(South Africa) Robert Maud	1	3	4

Final
7	(United States) Robert Lutz	6^{2}	6^{5}	6	4
3	(United States) Stan Smith	7^{7}	7^{7}	4	6

=== Top half ===
Second round
2	(Australia) C Dibley	6	3	6
(Australia) T Addison	3	6	3
(South Africa) F McMillan	w/o
(South Africa) C Drysdale
6	(Australia) R Emerson	6	6
(Brazil) JE Mandarino	4	0
(Australia) B Phillips-Moore	1	3
(Socialist Federal Republic of Yugoslavia) N Pilić	6	6

Quarterfinals
2	(Australia) C Dibley	6^{6}	6	6
(South Africa) F McMillan	7^{8}	1	1
6	(Australia) R Emerson	6^{3}	6^{6}
(Socialist Federal Republic of Yugoslavia) N Pilić	7^{7}	7^{8}

Semifinals
2	(Australia) C Dibley	7^{7}	2	6^{1}
(Socialist Federal Republic of Yugoslavia) N Pilić	6^{2}	6	7^{7}
Semifinals
(United States) D Stockton	6	6^{3}	7	3
7	(United States) R Lutz	4	7^{7}	6	6

=== Bottom half ===
Second round
12	(United States) T Edlefsen	6^{1}	7	6^{8}
(Chile) J Fillol	7^{7}	5	7^{10}
(Chile) P Cornejo	4	0
8	(United States) C Richey	6	6
10	(Australia) P Dent	7^{7}	6
(United States) J McManus	6^{3}	3
(United States) R Barth	2	4
3	(United States) S Smith	6	6

Quarterfinals
(Chile) J Fillol	6	6^{5}	4
8	(United States) C Richey	3	7^{7}	6
10	(Australia) P Dent	3	3
3	(United States) S Smith	6	6

Semifinals
8	(United States) C Richey	0	3
3	(United States) S Smith	6	6
Semifinals
3	(South Africa) R Maud	6	4	6
(Australia) R Laver	4	6	6^{6}
