= 1992 U.S. Pro Indoor – Doubles =

Doubles
- 1992 U.S. Pro Indoor

Final
- Champions: (Australia) Todd Woodbridge; (Australia) Mark Woodforde
- Runners-up: (United States) Jim Grabb; (United States) Richey Reneberg
- Score: 6–4, 7–6

Events
Singles	Doubles
- U.S. Pro Indoor

Rick Leach and Jim Pugh were the defending champions, but did not participate together this year. Leach partnered Kelly Jones, losing in the semifinals. Pugh partnered Derrick Rostagno, losing in the second round.

Todd Woodbridge and Mark Woodforde won the title, defeating Jim Grabb and Richey Reneberg 6–4, 7–6 in the final.

== Seeds ==
All seeds receive a bye into the second round.

1. (United States) Ken Flach / (United States) Robert Seguso (second round)
2. (Australia) Todd Woodbridge / (Australia) Mark Woodforde (champions)
3. (United States) Scott Davis / (United States) David Pate (second round)
4. (Canada) Grant Connell / (Canada) Glenn Michibata (semifinals)
5. (United States) Kelly Jones / (United States) Rick Leach (semifinals)
6. (United States) Patrick Galbraith / (United States) Todd Witsken (second round)
7. (South Africa) Wayne Ferreira / (South Africa) Piet Norval (second round)
8. (United States) Jim Grabb / (United States) Richey Reneberg (final)

== Draw ==
Key

- Q = Qualifier
- WC = Wild card
- LL = Lucky loser
- Alt = Alternate
- ITF = ITF entry
- PR = Protected ranking
- SR = Special ranking
- SE = Special exempt
- JE = Junior exempt
- JR = Junior Accelerator Programme entrant
- CO = College Accelerator Programme entrant
- NG = Next Gen Accelerator Program entrant
- w/o = Walkover
- r = Retired
- d = Defaulted

=== Finals ===
Semifinals

Final

8
- (United States) Jim Grabb
- (United States) Richey Reneberg
6
3
7

5
- (United States) Kelly Jones
- (United States) Rick Leach
4
6
6

8
- (United States) Jim Grabb
- (United States) Richey Reneberg
4
6

2
- (Australia) Todd Woodbridge
- (Australia) Mark Woodforde
6
7

4
- (Canada) Grant Connell
- (Canada) Glenn Michibata
4
5

2
- (Australia) Todd Woodbridge
- (Australia) Mark Woodforde
6
7

=== Top half ===
First round

Second round

Quarterfinals

Semifinals

1
- (United States) K Flach
- (United States) R Seguso
3
2

- (United States) K Curren
- (South Africa) G Muller
3
7
3

- (Australia) M Kratzmann
- (Australia) W Masur
6
6

- (Australia) M Kratzmann
- (Australia) W Masur
6
6
6

- (Australia) M Kratzmann
- (Australia) W Masur
4
6
6

- (South Africa) S Kruger
- (United States) B Pearce
1
4

8
- (United States) J Grabb
- (United States) R Reneberg
6
3
7

WC
- (United States) B Gilbert
- (Australia) S Stolle
6
6

WC
- (United States) B Gilbert
- (Australia) S Stolle
6
6
4

8
- (United States) J Grabb
- (United States) R Reneberg
3
7
6

8
- (United States) J Grabb
- (United States) R Reneberg
6
3
7

5
- (United States) K Jones
- (United States) R Leach
4
6
6

3
- (United States) S Davis
- (United States) D Pate
6
6
6

- (South Africa) P Aldrich
- (South Africa) D Visser
6
4

- (United States) G Layendecker
- (South Africa) B Talbot
7
4
7

- (United States) G Layendecker
- (South Africa) B Talbot
7
6

- (United States) G Layendecker
- (South Africa) B Talbot
2
4

WC
- (United States) J Pugh
- (United States) D Rostagno
6
6

5
- (United States) K Jones
- (United States) R Leach
6
6

- (United States) J Sobel
- (Sweden) T Svantesson
4
4

WC
- (United States) J Pugh
- (United States) D Rostagno
6
0
3

5
- (United States) K Jones
- (United States) R Leach
2
6
6

=== Bottom half ===
First round

Second round

Quarterfinals

Semifinals

6
- (United States) P Galbraith
- (United States) T Witsken
6
4
4

- (Netherlands) M Schapers
- (Czechoslovakia) D Vacek
6
3
6

Q
- (United States) M Keil
- (United States) D Randall
3
6
6

Q
- (United States) M Keil
- (United States) D Randall
3
6
7

Q
- (United States) M Keil
- (United States) D Randall
5
4

- (United States) K Kinnear
- (United States) S Salumaa
6
6
6

4
- (Canada) G Connell
- (Canada) G Michibata
7
6

- (United States) P Annacone
- (South Africa) C van Rensburg
7
3
2

- (United States) K Kinnear
- (United States) S Salumaa
3
2

4
- (Canada) G Connell
- (Canada) G Michibata
6
6

4
- (Canada) G Connell
- (Canada) G Michibata
4
5

2
- (Australia) T Woodbridge
- (Australia) M Woodforde
6
7

7
- (South Africa) W Ferreira
- (South Africa) P Norval
5
0^{r}

- (Netherlands) P Haarhuis
- (Mexico) L Lavalle
6
6

- (Netherlands) P Haarhuis
- (Mexico) L Lavalle
7
1

- (Sweden) P Lundgren
- (Venezuela) N Pereira
4
2

- (Netherlands) P Haarhuis
- (Mexico) L Lavalle
6
5
3

WC
- (Italy) C Caratti
- (Israel) A Mansdorf
1
5

2
- (Australia) T Woodbridge
- (Australia) M Woodforde
4
7
6

- (Brazil) R Acioly
- (Argentina) P Albano
6
7

- (Brazil) R Acioly
- (Argentina) P Albano
3
4

2
- (Australia) T Woodbridge
- (Australia) M Woodforde
6
6
