= 1994 Comcast U.S. Indoor – Singles =

Singles
- 1994 Comcast U.S. Indoor

Final
- Champion: (United States) Michael Chang
- Runner-up: (Netherlands) Paul Haarhuis
- Score: 6–3, 6–2

Details
- Draw: 32
- Seeds: 8

Events
Singles	Doubles
← 1993 ·	U.S. Pro Indoor	· 1995 →

Mark Woodforde was the defending champion, but did not participate this year.

Michael Chang won the title, beating Paul Haarhuis 6–3, 6–2 in the final.

== Seeds ==
1. (United States) Pete Sampras (first round)
2. (United States) Jim Courier (semifinals)
3. (United States) Michael Chang (champion)
4. (United States) Todd Martin (second round)
5. (United States) Ivan Lendl (second round, retired)
6. (United States) MaliVai Washington (first round)
7. (Russia) Andrei Chesnokov (quarterfinals)
8. (Peru) Jaime Yzaga (semifinals)

== Draw ==
=== Key ===
- Q = Qualifier
- WC = Wild card
- LL = Lucky loser
- Alt = Alternate
- SE = Special exempt
- PR = Protected ranking
- ITF = ITF entry
- JE = Junior exempt
- w/o = Walkover
- r = Retired
- d = Defaulted
- SR = Special ranking

=== Finals ===
Semifinals
8	(Peru) Jaime Yzaga	3	3
(Netherlands) Paul Haarhuis	6	6
3	(United States) Michael Chang	7^{8}	6
2	(United States) Jim Courier	6^{6}	2

Final
(Netherlands) Paul Haarhuis	3	2
3	(United States) Michael Chang	6	6

=== Top half ===
First round
1	(United States) P Sampras	6^{8}	4
(Netherlands) J Eltingh	7^{10}	6
(Brazil) L Mattar	6	6
(South Africa) G Stafford	2	4
(Canada) G Rusedski	7^{7}	7^{7}
WC	(United States) J Palmer	6^{5}	6^{3}
(Germany) K Braasch	3	2
8	(Peru) J Yzaga	6	6
4	(United States) T Martin	6	1	6
Q	(United States) A Reichel	1	6	4
Q	(United States) L Gloria	5	2
(United States) J Grabb	7	6
WC	(United States) J Connors	4	6	6^{3}
(Netherlands) P Haarhuis	6	2	7^{7}
(Italy) R Furlan	6	4	7^{7}
6	(United States) M Washington	2	6	6^{1}

Second round
(Netherlands) J Eltingh	7^{7}	6
(Brazil) L Mattar	6^{2}	2
(Canada) G Rusedski	6^{0}	3
8	(Peru) J Yzaga	7^{7}	6
4	(United States) T Martin	4	6	4
(United States) J Grabb	6	3	6
(Netherlands) P Haarhuis	7^{7}	4	6
(Italy) R Furlan	6^{5}	6	1

Quarterfinals
(Netherlands) J Eltingh	6	5	2
8	(Peru) J Yzaga	2	7	6
(United States) J Grabb	6^{5}	7	3
(Netherlands) P Haarhuis	7^{7}	5	6

Semifinals
8	(Peru) J Yzaga	3	3
(Netherlands) P Haarhuis	6	6

=== Bottom half ===
First round
5	(United States) I Lendl	6	4	6
(United States) P McEnroe	4	6	4
(United States) J Stark	7^{7}	7^{7}
(Italy) S Pescosolido	6^{2}	6^{3}
(Sweden) T Enqvist	3	5
(Switzerland) J Hlasek	6	7
(United States) C Adams	6	1	2
3	(United States) M Chang	3	6	6
7	(Russia) A Chesnokov	6	1	6
(United States) J Tarango	4	6	4
(United States) A O'Brien	7	7^{8}
(Zimbabwe) B Black	5	6^{6}
Q	(Canada) S Lareau	4	3
Q	(United States) D Flach	6	6
WC	(United States) D DiLucia	3	0
2	(United States) J Courier	6	6

Second round
5	(United States) I Lendl	3	r
(United States) J Stark	6
(Switzerland) J Hlasek	6	3	3
3	(United States) M Chang	4	6	6
7	(Russia) A Chesnokov	3	6	6
(United States) A O'Brien	6	3	4
Q	(United States) D Flach	1	3
2	(United States) J Courier	6	6

Quarterfinals
(United States) J Stark	2	3
3	(United States) M Chang	6	6
7	(Russia) A Chesnokov	3	7^{12}	2
2	(United States) J Courier	6	6^{10}	6

Semifinals
3	(United States) M Chang	7^{8}	6
2	(United States) J Courier	6^{6}	2
