= 1993 Comcast U.S. Indoor – Singles =

Singles
- 1993 Comcast U.S. Indoor

Final
- Champion: (Australia) Mark Woodforde
- Runner-up: (United States) Ivan Lendl
- Score: 5–4^{r}

Details
- Draw: 32
- Seeds: 8

Events
Singles	Doubles
← 1992 ·	U.S. Pro Indoor	· 1994 →

Pete Sampras was the defending champion, but lost in the semifinals this year.

Mark Woodforde won the title, beating Ivan Lendl 5–4 in the final, when Lendl retired from the match.

== Seeds ==
1. (United States) Jim Courier (first round)
2. (United States) Pete Sampras (semifinals)
3. (United States) Michael Chang (quarterfinals)
4. (United States) Ivan Lendl (final, retired)
5. (United States) MaliVai Washington (quarterfinals)
6. (Spain) Francisco Clavet (first round)
7. (United States) Brad Gilbert (first round)
8. (Israel) Amos Mansdorf (quarterfinals)

== Draw ==
=== Key ===
- Q = Qualifier
- WC = Wild card
- LL = Lucky loser
- Alt = Alternate
- SE = Special exempt
- PR = Protected ranking
- ITF = ITF entry
- JE = Junior exempt
- w/o = Walkover
- r = Retired
- d = Defaulted
- SR = Special ranking

=== Finals ===
Semifinals
WC	(United States) Derrick Rostagno	5	5
(Australia) Mark Woodforde	7	7
4	(United States) Ivan Lendl	7^{7}	6
2	(United States) Pete Sampras	6^{4}	4

Final
(Australia) Mark Woodforde	5
4	(United States) Ivan Lendl	4^{r}

=== Top half ===
First round
1	(United States) J Courier	6^{5}	1
WC	(United States) D Rostagno	7^{7}	6
(Italy) S Pescosolido	3	5
(Netherlands) P Haarhuis	6	7
(Italy) R Furlan	6	6
(Peru) J Yzaga	2	2
(United States) D Wheaton	6	5	3
8	(Israel) A Mansdorf	4	7	6
3	(United States) M Chang	6	2	6
(Spain) E Sánchez	1	6	1
Q	(United States) P McEnroe	2	4
(Russia) A Chesnokov	6	6
(United States) T Martin	0^{r}
(Uruguay) M Filippini	5
(Australia) M Woodforde	6	6
6	(Spain) F Clavet	1	3

Second round
WC	(United States) D Rostagno	3	6	6
(Netherlands) P Haarhuis	6	3	2
(Italy) R Furlan	6^{3}	5
8	(Israel) A Mansdorf	7^{7}	7
3	(United States) M Chang	6	6
(Russia) A Chesnokov	2	1
(Uruguay) M Filippini	2	4
(Australia) M Woodforde	6	6

Quarterfinals
WC	(United States) D Rostagno	6	6
8	(Israel) A Mansdorf	4	3
3	(United States) M Chang	3	4
(Australia) M Woodforde	6	6

Semifinals
WC	(United States) D Rostagno	5	5
(Australia) M Woodforde	7	7

=== Bottom half ===
First round
5	(United States) M Washington	6	6
(Australia) T Woodbridge	4	4
(Brazil) J Oncins	2	6	5
(United States) J Tarango	6	2	7
(United States) J Grabb	6	6
(Brazil) L Mattar	3	3
(South Africa) M Ondruska	6	3	2
4	(United States) I Lendl	3	6	6
7	(United States) B Gilbert	2	2
WC	(United States) R Reneberg	6	6
Q	(Australia) R Fromberg	6	7^{7}
Q	(New Zealand) B Steven	2	6^{5}
WC	(United States) D DiLucia	2	7^{12}	3
(Sweden) T Enqvist	6	6^{10}	6
Q	(Australia) S Youl	2	7^{7}	3
2	(United States) P Sampras	6	6^{4}	6

Second round
5	(United States) M Washington	7	6
(United States) J Tarango	5	4
(United States) J Grabb	4	6^{3}
4	(United States) I Lendl	6	7^{7}
WC	(United States) R Reneberg	6	6
Q	(Australia) R Fromberg	2	3
(Sweden) T Enqvist	1	5
2	(United States) P Sampras	6	7

Quarterfinals
5	(United States) M Washington	5	2
4	(United States) I Lendl	7	6
WC	(United States) R Reneberg	6	4	6^{6}
2	(United States) P Sampras	4	6	7^{8}

Semifinals
4	(United States) I Lendl	7^{7}	6
2	(United States) P Sampras	6^{4}	4
