= 1980 U.S. Pro Indoor – Singles =

Singles
- 1980 U.S. Pro Indoor

Final
- Champion: (United States) Jimmy Connors
- Runner-up: (United States) John McEnroe
- Score: 6–3, 2–6, 6–3, 3–6, 6–4

Details
- Draw: 48
- Seeds: 16

Events
Singles	Doubles
- U.S. Pro Indoor

Jimmy Connors was the defending champion.

Connors successfully defended his title, defeating John McEnroe, 6–3, 2–6, 6–3, 3–6, 6–4 in the final.

== Seeds ==
1. (United States) Jimmy Connors (champion)
2. (United States) John McEnroe (final)
3. (United States) Vitas Gerulaitis (second round)
4. N/A
5. (United States) Harold Solomon (quarterfinals)
6. (Spain) José Higueras (third round)
7. (United States) Gene Mayer (semifinals)
8. (United States) Peter Fleming (second round)
9. (Poland) Wojtek Fibak (quarterfinals)
10. (Argentina) José Luis Clerc (quarterfinals)
11. (United States) Brian Gottfried (third round)
12. N/A
13. (United States) Stan Smith (third round)
14. (United States) Victor Amaya (second round)
15. (France) Yannick Noah (first round)
16. (United States) Tim Gullikson (third round)

== Draw ==
Key

- Q = Qualifier
- WC = Wild card
- LL = Lucky loser
- Alt = Alternate
- ITF = ITF entry
- PR = Protected ranking
- SR = Special ranking
- SE = Special exempt
- JE = Junior exempt
- JR = Junior Accelerator Programme entrant
- CO = College Accelerator Programme entrant
- NG = Next Gen Accelerator Program entrant
- w/o = Walkover
- r = Retired
- d = Defaulted

=== Finals ===
Semifinals
1	(United States) Jimmy Connors	6	6	6
7	(United States) Gene Mayer	4	0	2
(United States) John Sadri	6	6	1	3
2	(United States) John McEnroe	7	4	6	6

Final
1	(United States) Jimmy Connors	6	2	6	3	6
2	(United States) John McEnroe	3	6	3	6	4

=== Top half ===
==== Section 1 ====
First round
(United States) To Gullikson	7	6
(France) D Bedel	6	2
(United States) B Manson	6	6	0
(Mexico) R Ramírez	4	7	6
Q	(United States) J Lapidus	4	2
(Australia) G Masters	6	6
(United States) A Pattison	5	6	6
(United States) F Taygan	7	4	1

Second round
1	(United States) J Connors	7	6
(United States) To Gullikson	5	4
(Mexico) R Ramírez	6	6
14	(United States) V Amaya	3	2
9	(Poland) W Fibak	7	7
(Australia) G Masters	6	5
(United States) A Pattison	4	6	6
6	(Spain) J Higueras	6	2	7

Third round
1	(United States) J Connors	6	6
(Mexico) R Ramírez	2	2
9	(Poland) W Fibak	3	6	6
6	(Spain) J Higueras	6	0	3

Quarterfinals
1	(United States) J Connors	6	6
9	(Poland) W Fibak	2	2

==== Section 2 ====
First round
(United States) E van Dillen	2	2
(South Africa) J Kriek	6	6
(United States) B Scanlon	5	7	7
15	(France) Y Noah	7	6	5
(Switzerland) H Günthardt	0	6	6
(Romania) I Năstase	6	4	1
(United States) V Van Patten	0	2
7	(United States) G Mayer	6	6

Second round
(South Africa) J Kriek	6	6
(Australia) C Kachel	1	2
(New Zealand) C Lewis	1	1
(United States) B Scanlon	6	6
(France) G Moretton	3	3
(Switzerland) H Günthardt	6	6
(United States) R Meyer	6	1
7	(United States) G Mayer	7	6

Third round
(South Africa) J Kriek	4	2
(United States) B Scanlon	6	6
(Switzerland) H Günthardt	3	3
7	(United States) G Mayer	6	6

Quarterfinals
(United States) B Scanlon	2	7	6
7	(United States) G Mayer	6	5	7

=== Bottom half ===
==== Section 3 ====
First round
5	(United States) H Solomon	6	6
(United States) B Kleege	4	2
(United States) V Winitsky	3	2
(Australia) M Edmondson	6	6
(United States) H Pfister	6	6
(United States) M Riessen	3	4
(Hungary) B Taróczy	6	6	3
(United States) J Sadri	7	4	6

Second round
5	(United States) H Solomon	6	7
Q	(United States) G Hardie	4	6
(Australia) M Edmondson	3	0
11	(United States) B Gottfried	6	6
13	(United States) S Smith	7	6
(United States) H Pfister	6	1
(United States) J Sadri	6	6
3	(United States) V Gerulaitis	4	4

Third round
5	(United States) H Solomon	6	6
11	(United States) B Gottfried	2	4
13	(United States) S Smith	6	6
(United States) J Sadri	7	7

Quarterfinals
5	(United States) H Solomon	2	5
(United States) J Sadri	6	7

==== Section 4 ====
First round
(United States) C Owens	6	2
(United States) B Martin	7	6
(United States) E Teltscher	6	6
(United States) T Wilkison	1	3
(South Africa) R Trogolo	7	6
(United States) T Moor	6	2
(United States) B Teacher	4	3
2	(United States) J McEnroe	6	6

Second round
8	(United States) P Fleming	4	3
(United States) B Martin	6	6
(United States) E Teltscher	6	2	2
10	(Argentina) J L Clerc	3	6	6
16	(United States) Ti Gullikson	7	6
(South Africa) R Trogolo	6	2
(United Kingdom) B Mottram	2	2
2	(United States) J McEnroe	6	6

Third round
(United States) B Martin	6	3	3
10	(Argentina) J L Clerc	2	6	6
16	(United States) Ti Gullikson	4	2
2	(United States) J McEnroe	6	6

Quarterfinals
10	(Argentina) J L Clerc	2	6	1
2	(United States) J McEnroe	6	4	6
