= 1991 U.S. Pro Indoor – Singles =

Singles
- 1991 U.S. Pro Indoor

Final
- Champion: (Czechoslovakia) Ivan Lendl
- Runner-up: (United States) Pete Sampras
- Score: 5–7, 6–4, 6–4, 3–6, 6–3

Details
- Draw: 48
- Seeds: 16

Events
Singles	Doubles
← 1990 ·	U.S. Pro Indoor	· 1992 →

Pete Sampras was the defending champion.

Ivan Lendl won the title, defeating Sampras, 5–7, 6–4, 6–4, 3–6, 6–3 in the final.

== Seeds ==
1. (Czechoslovakia) Ivan Lendl (champion)
2. (United States) Pete Sampras (final)
3. (United States) Brad Gilbert (semifinals)
4. (United States) John McEnroe (semifinals)
5. (United States) Jay Berger (second round)
6. (United States) Jim Courier (second round)
7. (Germany) Michael Stich (quarterfinals)
8. (United States) Tim Mayotte (second round)
9. (Czechoslovakia) Petr Korda (quarterfinals)
10. (United States) Derrick Rostagno (second round)
11. (Australia) Darren Cahill (third round)
12. (Netherlands) Mark Koevermans (second round)
13. (Australia) Wally Masur (third round)
14. (Netherlands) Paul Haarhuis (third round)
15. (South Africa) Gary Muller (third round)
16. (United States) Patrick McEnroe (second round)

== Draw ==
=== Key ===
- Q = Qualifier
- WC = Wild card
- LL = Lucky loser
- Alt = Alternate
- ITF = ITF entry
- PR = Protected ranking
- SR = Special ranking
- SE = Special exempt
- JE = Junior exempt
- JR = Junior Accelerator Programme entrant
- CO = College Accelerator Programme entrant
- NG = Next Gen Accelerator Program entrant
- w/o = Walkover
- r = Retired
- d = Defaulted

=== Finals ===
Semifinals
1	(Czechoslovakia) Ivan Lendl	6	3	6
3	(United States) Brad Gilbert	4	6	4
4/WC	(United States) John McEnroe	2	4
2	(United States) Pete Sampras	6	6

Final
1	(Czechoslovakia) Ivan Lendl	5	6	6	3	6
2	(United States) Pete Sampras	7	4	4	6	3

=== Top half ===
==== Section 1 ====
First round
Q	(United States) D Goldie	4	6^{7}
(France) G Raoux	6	7^{9}
(Italy) R Furlan	4	7	6
(Finland) V Paloheimo	6	5	4
Q	(South Africa) G Stafford	2	2
Q	(United States) C Adams	6	6
Q	(United States) J Tarango	5	4
WC	(Italy) C Caratti	7	6

Second round
1	(Czechoslovakia) I Lendl	6	7
(France) G Raoux	1	5
(Italy) R Furlan	7^{7}	3	4
15	(South Africa) G Muller	6^{5}	6	6
10	(United States) D Rostagno	5	3
Q	(United States) C Adams	7	6
WC	(Italy) C Caratti	2	4
7	(Germany) M Stich	6	6

Third round
1	(Czechoslovakia) I Lendl	7^{7}	6
15	(South Africa) G Muller	6^{5}	3
Q	(United States) C Adams	4	4
7	(Germany) M Stich	6	6

Quarterfinals
1	(Czechoslovakia) I Lendl	6	7^{9}
7	(Germany) M Stich	2	6^{7}

==== Section 2 ====
First round
(Spain) T Carbonell	6	6
WC	(Israel) G Bloom	1	1
(Germany) U Riglewski	6	6^{3}	6
Q	(United States) G Layendecker	3	7^{7}	0
(Sweden) T Högstedt	6	6
(India) R Krishnan	3	1
(Australia) M Kratzmann	3	7^{7}	4
(United States) K Curren	6	6^{4}	6

Second round
3	(United States) B Gilbert	6	6
(Spain) T Carbonell	3	3
(Germany) U Riglewski	1	3
14	(Netherlands) P Haarhuis	6	6
11	(Australia) D Cahill	6	6
(Sweden) T Högstedt	4	2
(United States) K Curren	6	6
5	(United States) J Berger	1	2

Third round
3	(United States) B Gilbert	7^{7}	6
14	(Netherlands) P Haarhuis	6^{3}	1
11	(Australia) D Cahill	7^{9}	3	6^{2}
(United States) K Curren	6^{7}	6	7^{7}

Quarterfinals
3	(United States) B Gilbert	4	6	6
(United States) K Curren	6	3	0

=== Bottom half ===
==== Section 3 ====
First round
(United States) J Grabb	6	6
(Germany) P Kühnen	4	4
(Finland) A Rahunen	7^{13}	7
(Canada) G Connell	6^{11}	5
(South Africa) C van Rensburg	6	6
(United States) B Pearce	2	1
(Germany) A Mronz	6	6
(Argentina) H de la Peña	2	2

Second round
6	(United States) J Courier	2	4
(United States) J Grabb	6	6
(Finland) A Rahunen	6	6
12	(Netherlands) M Koevermans	1	2
13	(Australia) W Masur	4	7^{7}	7^{7}
(South Africa) C van Rensburg	6	6^{1}	6^{5}
(Germany) A Mronz	1	2
4/WC	(United States) J McEnroe	6	6

Third round
(United States) J Grabb	7^{7}	1	3
(Finland) A Rahunen	6^{3}	6	6
13	(Australia) W Masur	6^{2}	4
4/WC	(United States) J McEnroe	7^{7}	6

Quarterfinals
(Finland) A Rahunen	5	3
4/WC	(United States) J McEnroe	7	6

==== Section 4 ====
First round
(France) J-P Fleurian	5	4
Q	(South Africa) W Ferreira	7	6
(Peru) J Yzaga	6	6
(Sweden) A Järryd	3	3
(Austria) A Antonitsch	6^{1}	6	0
(United States) M Washington	7^{7}	4	6
(Czechoslovakia) M Šrejber	6	6^{2}	6
(United States) S Davis	4	7^{7}	3

Second round
8	(United States) T Mayotte	4	2
Q	(South Africa) W Ferreira	6	6
(Peru) J Yzaga	4	3
9	(Czechoslovakia) P Korda	6	6
16/WC	(United States) P McEnroe	0	3
(United States) M Washington	6	6
(Czechoslovakia) M Šrejber	2	5
2	(United States) P Sampras	6	7

Third round
Q	(South Africa) W Ferreira	5	6^{3}
9	(Czechoslovakia) P Korda	7	7^{7}
(United States) M Washington	3	6^{7}
2	(United States) P Sampras	6	7^{9}

Quarterfinals
9	(Czechoslovakia) P Korda	4	0
2	(United States) P Sampras	6	6
