= Marilyn Fernberger =

American tennis tournament director

- Born: 13 August 1927
- Died: 2 May 2012 (aged 85)
- Education: University of Pennsylvania (BA)
- Occupation: Tournament director of the US Pro Indoor Tennis championships for 25 years.
- Title: Co-Chair of U.S. Pro Indoor
- Spouse: Edward Fernberger (m. 21 June 1947)
- Children: 3

Marilyn Fernberger (13 August 1927 – 2 May 2012) was the first female co-chair of the U.S. Pro-Indoor Tennis Championship. Her "enthusiasm and dedication for the sport of tennis" earned her induction into the Philadelphia Jewish Sports Hall of Fame in 2002.

== Early life and education ==
Marilyn Fernberger (née Friedman) was born to David and Edith Friedman on 13 August 1927. Marilyn grew up in the Mount Airy neighborhood of Philadelphia, PA. She attended and graduated from the Philadelphia High School for Girls. During her time there she participated in field hockey, tennis, and was on the swim team. After high school, she went to college at the University of Pennsylvania, where she met her husband, Edward Fernberger. There she studied English and political science. She graduated and received her bachelor's degree for those subjects in 1948.

== Career ==
Fernberger became the first female co-chair of a professional tennis tournament, alongside her husband and co-chair Edward (Ed) Fernberger. The United States Tennis Association (USTA) began the Fernbergers' career in tennis, as they first became involved with the Philadelphia district and Middle States section.

They decided to turn the Philadelphia Invitational Indoor, an 8-player male tennis tournament hosted at St. Joseph's Memorial Field House, into the U.S. Pro Indoor hosted at the Spectrum. The U.S. Indoor Pro was part of the World Championship Tennis Circuit and the Grand Prix Tour. During her time as co-chair with her husband, from 1968 to 1992, attendance increased from around 2,500 attendees to over 95,000 including players representing over 20 countries. She is credited for bringing women's professional tennis to Philadelphia, as she chaired the Virginia Slims tournament from 1970 to 1979. Ed and Marilyn Fernberger were nicknamed the "dynamic duo" of the tennis world, as they continued to conduct and promote both youth and adult tennis tournaments.

Marilyn was able to give back to her community and tennis by bringing tennis to the youth of many communities in Philadelphia, especially less-fortunate children. Through fundraising and non-profit organizations, the couple brought free public park tennis programs and other youth programs to Philadelphia.

== Achievements ==
In 2002, Fernberger was given the Chairman's Award and inducted into the International Tennis Hall of Fame for her outstanding service as a board member to the International Tennis Hall of Fame. Following this achievement, she also was recognized as Strathmore's Professional of the Year in 2006 for her work consulting in the world of both sports and arts.

=== Titles and achievements ===
- Strathmore's Professional of the Year (2006) for Consulting/Sports and Arts
- International Tennis Hall of Fame Chairman's Award
- Greater Philadelphia Chamber of Commerce
- Lifetime Member Board of Directors, International Tennis Hall of Fame
- Board of Directors, Philadelphia Sports Congress
- Board of Directors, Philadelphia Museum of Art Associates
- Past President, Rodin Museum of Art
- Co-chair, U.S. Pro Indoor Tennis Championship

== Personal life ==
Marilyn married her husband and business partner Edward Fernberger on 21 June 1947. They had children Edward Jr., Ellen, and Jim Fernberger.

During their careers in the professional tennis industry, both Marilyn and Edward got to know players well as they welcomed them into their home, and Marilyn became close friends with the players and their wives while observing the tournaments. Marilyn and Edward once hosted an indoor open with a variety of tennis players in attendance.
