= 1975 U.S. Pro Indoor – Singles =

Singles
- 1975 U.S. Pro Indoor

Final
- Champion: (United States) Marty Riessen
- Runner-up: (United States) Vitas Gerulaitis
- Score: 7–6^{(7–1)}, 5–7, 6–2, 6–7^{(0–7)}, 6–3

Details
- Draw: 84
- Seeds: 16

Events
Singles	Doubles
← 1974 ·	U.S. Pro Indoor	· 1976 →

The 1975 U.S. Pro Indoor – Singles was an event of the 1975 U.S. Pro Indoor tennis tournament and was played on outdoor carpet courts at the Spectrum in Philadelphia, Pennsylvania in the United States from January 20 through January 26, 1975. The draw comprised 82 players and 16 of them were seeded. Second-seeded Rod Laver was the defending U.S. Pro Indoor singles champion but lost in the second round in this edition. Seventh-seeded Marty Riessen won the title by defeating unseeded Vitas Gerulaitis in the final, 7–6^{(7–1)}, 5–7, 6–2, 6–7^{(0–7)}, 6–3.

== Seeds ==
1. (Sweden) Björn Borg (third round)
2. (Australia) Rod Laver (second round)
3. (Argentina) Guillermo Vilas (second round, withdrew)
4. (Netherlands) Tom Okker (third round)
5. (United States) Arthur Ashe (quarterfinals)
6. (United States) Stan Smith (third round)
7. (United States) Marty Riessen (champion)
8. (Soviet Union) Alex Metreveli (first round)
9. (United States) Roscoe Tanner (third round)
10. (United States) Dick Stockton (second round)
11. (United States) Harold Solomon (third round)
12. (South Africa) Cliff Drysdale (third round)
13. (Mexico) Raúl Ramírez (fourth round)
14. (United States) Tom Gorman (fourth round)
15. (United States) Eddie Dibbs (third round)
16. (United States) Cliff Richey (quarterfinals)

== Draw ==
=== Key ===
- Q = Qualifier
- WC = Wild card
- LL = Lucky loser
- Alt = Alternate
- ITF = ITF entry
- PR = Protected ranking
- SR = Special ranking
- SE = Special exempt
- JE = Junior exempt
- JR = Junior Accelerator Programme entrant
- CO = College Accelerator Programme entrant
- NG = Next Gen Accelerator Program entrant
- w/o = Walkover
- r = Retired
- d = Defaulted

=== Final rounds ===
Quarterfinals
16	(United States) Cliff Richey	2	6^{6}
(Australia) John Alexander	6	7^{8}
(United States) Vitas Gerulaitis	7	6
(United States) Paul Gerken	5	3
5	(United States) Arthur Ashe	6^{6}	6	6^{6}
(Chile) Jaime Fillol	7^{8}	2	7^{8}
7	(United States) Marty Riessen	7	6
(Australia) Tony Roche	5	0

Semifinals
(Australia) John Alexander	4	6^{1}	3
(United States) Vitas Gerulaitis	6	7^{7}	6
(Chile) Jaime Fillol	1	4	0
7	(United States) Marty Riessen	6	6	6

Final
(United States) Vitas Gerulaitis	6^{1}	7	2	7^{7}	3
7	(United States) Marty Riessen	7^{7}	5	6	6^{0}	6

=== Top half ===
==== Section 1 ====
First round

Second round
1	(Sweden) B Borg	7	6
(Soviet Union) T Kakoulia	5	4
(United States) R Lutz	6	1	6
(United States) E van Dillen	4	6	4
16	(United States) C Richey	6	3	6
(Sweden) K Johansson	4	6	3
(Australia) R Ruffels	6	6
(United States) A Pattison	4	4

Third round
1	(Sweden) B Borg	1	4
(United States) R Lutz	6	6
16	(United States) C Richey	6^{5}	7	7^{7}
(Australia) R Ruffels	7^{7}	5	6^{3}

Fourth round
(United States) R Lutz	6	2	3
16	(United States) C Richey	1	6	6

==== Section 2 ====
First round

Second round
6	(United States) S Smith	6	7^{7}
(New Zealand) R Simpson	2	6^{4}
(United States) J McManus	3	5
(Egypt) I El Shafei	6	7
15	(United States) E Dibbs	7	6
(Italy) A Panatta	5	3
(Czechoslovakia) J Hřebec	6^{6}	4
(Australia) J Alexander	7^{8}	6

Third round
6	(United States) S Smith	6^{6}	3
(Egypt) I El Shafei	7^{8}	6
15	(United States) E Dibbs	4	0
(Australia) J Alexander	6	6

Fourth round
(Egypt) I El Shafei	3	4
(Australia) J Alexander	6	6

==== Section 3 ====
First round
(Hungary) B Taróczy
(United States) C Pasarell	w/o
(United Kingdom) J Lloyd	6	6
(Australia) R Emerson	3	4

Second round
4	(Netherlands) T Okker	6	6
(Spain) J Higueras	2	3
(United States) V Gerulaitis	7	4	6
(Sweden) ON Bengtson	5	6	1
13	(Mexico) R Ramírez	6	6^{6}	6
(Australia) B Giltinan	4	7^{8}	1
(United States) C Pasarell	6	6
(United Kingdom) J Lloyd	2	3

Third round
4	(Netherlands) T Okker	6	5	4
(United States) V Gerulaitis	4	7	6
13	(Mexico) R Ramírez	6	4	6
(United States) C Pasarell	4	6	4

Fourth round
(United States) V Gerulaitis	6	6
13	(Mexico) R Ramírez	3	0

==== Section 4 ====
First round
8	(Soviet Union) A Metreveli	3	6	6^{4}
(United States) S Stewart	6	3	7^{7}
(United States) P Gerken	1	7	5
(South Africa) B Hewitt	6	5	2^{r}
(India) V Amritraj	w/o
(Socialist Federal Republic of Yugoslavia) N Pilić
(Japan) J Kamiwazumi	1	2
(United Kingdom) B Mottram	6	6
10	(United States) D Stockton	6	6
(Australia) R Case	1	1
(United States) S Mayer	6	6
(Italy) P Bertolucci	1	4
(Socialist Federal Republic of Yugoslavia) Ž Franulović	6^{6}	7	6^{3}
(Australia) D Crealy	7^{8}	5	7^{7}
(Italy) C Barazzutti	6	6
(Israel) S Krulevitz	4	4

Second round
(United States) S Stewart	3	4
(United States) P Gerken	6	6
(India) V Amritraj	6	7^{7}
(United Kingdom) B Mottram	3	6^{3}
10	(United States) D Stockton	4	7	2
(United States) S Mayer	6	5	6
(Australia) D Crealy	4	7^{7}	6
(Italy) C Barazzutti	6	6^{1}	1

Third round
(United States) P Gerken	1	7^{8}	6
(India) V Amritraj	6	6^{6}	2
(United States) S Mayer	6	7^{8}
(Australia) D Crealy	3	6^{6}

Fourth round
(United States) P Gerken	7^{7}	6^{4}	7^{8}
(United States) S Mayer	6^{3}	7^{7}	6^{6}

=== Bottom half ===
==== Section 5 ====
First round
(Pakistan) H Rahim	w/o
(Czechoslovakia) V Zedník
(Australia) G Masters	2	4
(United States) B Gottfried	6	6
(Czechoslovakia) M Holeček	6	2	6
(South Africa) R Maud	1	6	2
(Italy) A Zugarelli
12	(South Africa) C Drysdale	w/o
(United States) J Borowiak	w/o
(France) P Barthès
(United Kingdom) M Cox	6	6
(United Kingdom) G Battrick	3	2
(South Africa) F McMillan	3	3
(United States) R Reid	6	6
(United States) T Edlefsen	3	3
5	(United States) A Ashe	6	6

Second round
(Pakistan) H Rahim	3	6	4
(United States) B Gottfried	6	2	6
(Czechoslovakia) M Holeček	5	6	4
12	(South Africa) C Drysdale	7	4	6
(United States) J Borowiak	7	4	6
(United Kingdom) M Cox	5	6	3
(United States) R Reid	3	1
5	(United States) A Ashe	6	6

Third round
(United States) B Gottfried	6	4	7
12	(South Africa) C Drysdale	2	6	5
(United States) J Borowiak	3	7	4
5	(United States) A Ashe	6	5	6

Fourth round
(United States) B Gottfried	4	7	2
5	(United States) A Ashe	6	5	6

==== Section 6 ====
First round
(New Zealand) O Parun	w/o
(Chile) P Cornejo
(New Zealand) B Fairlie	6	6
(West Germany) HJ Pohmann	0	1

Second round
(New Zealand) O Parun	1	6^{6}
(New Zealand) B Fairlie	6	7^{8}
(Austria) H Kary	6^{2}	0
14	(United States) T Gorman	7^{7}	6
(Chile) J Fillol	w/o
(Brazil) T Koch
(South Africa) R Moore	w/o
3	(Argentina) G Vilas

Third round
(New Zealand) B Fairlie	3	4
14	(United States) T Gorman	6	6
(Chile) J Fillol	6	6
(South Africa) R Moore	1	4

Fourth round
14	(United States) T Gorman	5	7^{7}	4
(Chile) J Fillol	7	6^{4}	6

==== Section 7 ====
First round

Second round
(Australia) S Ball	7	6
(Colombia) I Molina	5	2
(France) P Dominguez	7^{7}	3	2
9	(United States) R Tanner	6^{4}	6	6
(United States) M Estep	4	6	6^{6}
(United States) D Dell	6	3	7^{8}
(India) A Amritraj	1	3
7	(United States) M Riessen	6	6

Third round
(Australia) S Ball	4	6	6
9	(United States) R Tanner	6	3	4
(United States) D Dell	1	4
7	(United States) M Riessen	6	6

Fourth round
(Australia) S Ball	3	2
7	(United States) M Riessen	6	6

==== Section 8 ====
First round

Second round
(Australia) C Dibley	2	3
(Australia) T Roche	6	6
(United Kingdom) G Stilwell	5	0
11	(United States) H Solomon	7	6
(Australia) B Phillips-Moore	6^{5}	4
(Australia) A Stone	7^{7}	6
(Australia) P Dent	7^{7}	5	7^{7}
2	(Australia) R Laver	6^{3}	7	6^{3}

Third round
(Australia) T Roche	7^{7}	6
11	(United States) H Solomon	6^{1}	4
(Australia) A Stone	2	2
(Australia) P Dent	6	6

Fourth round
(Australia) T Roche	6	6^{3}	6
(Australia) P Dent	4	7^{7}	4
