= 1971 Philadelphia International Indoor Open Championships =

- Date: February 9–14
- Edition: 4th
- Category: World Championship Tennis (men); Virginia Slims Circuit (women)
- Draw: 32S (men); 16S (women)
- Prize money: $50,000 (men) $12,500 (women)
- Surface: Carpet / indoor
- Location: Philadelphia, Pennsylvania, United States
- Venue: Spectrum
- Attendance: 50,199

Champions

Men's singles
- (Australia) John Newcombe

Women's singles
- (United States) Rosie Casals
- U.S. Pro Indoor

The 1971 Philadelphia International Indoor Open Championships also called the Philadelphia International Indoor was a WCT and Virginia Slims Circuit tennis tournament played on indoor carpet courts. It was played at the Spectrum in Philadelphia, Pennsylvania in the United States. It was the fourth edition of the tournament and was held from February 9 through February 14, 1971. John Newcombe and Rosie Casals won the singles titles.

== Finals ==
=== Men's singles ===
(Australia) John Newcombe defeated (Australia) Rod Laver 7–6^{(7–5)}, 7–6^{(7–1)}, 6–4

- It was Newcombe's 1st title of the year and the 12th of his professional career.

=== Woman's singles ===
(United States) Rosie Casals defeated (France) Françoise Dürr 6–2, 3–6, 6–2
