= 1971 Philadelphia International Indoor Open Championships – Men's singles =

Men's singles
- 1971 Philadelphia International Indoor Open Championships

Final
- Champion: (Australia) John Newcombe
- Runner-up: (Australia) Rod Laver
- Score: 7–6^{(7–5)}, 7–6^{(7–1)}, 6–4

Details
- Draw: 32
- Seeds: 12

Events
Singles	men	women
Doubles	men	women
← 1970 ·	Philadelphia International Indoor Open Championships	· 1972 →

The 1971 Philadelphia International Indoor Open Championships – Men's singles was an event of the 1971 Philadelphia International Indoor Open Championships, tennis tournament played at the Spectrum in Philadelphia, Pennsylvania in the United States from February 9 through February 14, 1971. The draw comprised 32 players and 12 of them were seeded. First-seeded Rod Laver was the defending singles champion. Third-seeded John Newcombe won the title, defeating Laver 7–6^{(7–5)}, 7–6^{(7–1)}, 6–4 in the final.

== Seeds ==
1. (Australia) Rod Laver (final)
2. (Australia) Ken Rosewall (first round)
3. (Australia) John Newcombe (champion)
4. (Australia) Tony Roche (second round)
5. (United States) Arthur Ashe (semifinals)
6. (Australia) Roy Emerson (quarterfinals)
7. (Netherlands) Tom Okker (quarterfinals)
8. (Spain) Andrés Gimeno (second round)
9. (United Kingdom) Roger Taylor (second round)
10. (United States) Dennis Ralston (quarterfinals)
11. (Socialist Federal Republic of Yugoslavia) Nikola Pilić (second round, retired)
12. (Australia) Fred Stolle (first round)

== Draw ==
=== Key ===
- Q = Qualifier
- WC = Wild card
- LL = Lucky loser
- Alt = Alternate
- SE = Special exempt
- PR = Protected ranking
- ITF = ITF entry
- JE = Junior exempt
- w/o = Walkover
- r = Retired
- d = Defaulted
- SR = Special ranking

=== Finals ===
Semifinals
1	(Australia) Rod Laver	6	7^{7}	3	6
5	(United States) Arthur Ashe	3	6^{1}	6	1
3	(Australia) John Newcombe	3	2	6	6	7^{7}
(South Africa) Cliff Drysdale	6	6	1	4	6^{4}

Final
1	(Australia) Rod Laver	6^{5}	6^{1}	4
3	(Australia) John Newcombe	7^{7}	7^{7}	6

=== Top half ===
Second round
1	(Australia) R Laver	6	6
(Australia) R Ruffels	0	4
(Australia) J Alexander	6	7^{11}
(United States) M Riessen	4	6^{9}
(United Kingdom) M Cox	6^{5}	6^{3}
(New Zealand) B Fairlie	7^{7}	7^{7}
(South Africa) R Maud	2	0
8	(Spain) A Gimeno	6	6

Quarterfinals
1	(Australia) R Laver	6	6
(Australia) J Alexander	4	2
(New Zealand) B Fairlie	5	7^{7}	7^{8}
8	(Spain) A Gimeno	7	6^{2}	6^{6}

Semifinals
1	(Australia) R Laver	6	6
(New Zealand) B Fairlie	3	2
Semifinals
1	(United States) A Ashe	7	4	3	6
5	(United States) D Ralston	5	6	1	1

=== Bottom half ===
Second round
3	(Australia) J Newcombe	6	6
(United States) R Barth	2	3
(Australia) B Bowrey	5	2
9	(United Kingdom) R Taylor	7	6
12	(Australia) F Stolle	5	2
(United States) R Lutz	7	6
(South Africa) F McMillan	1	3
7	(Netherlands) T Okker	6	6

Quarterfinals
3	(Australia) J Newcombe	6	6
9	(United Kingdom) R Taylor	1	4
(United States) R Lutz	2	3
7	(Netherlands) T Okker	6	6

Semifinals
3	(Australia) J Newcombe	4	6	7^{7}
7	(Netherlands) T Okker	6	4	6^{2}
Semifinals
3	(Australia) R Emerson	5	6	6	6	7^{7}
(South Africa) C Drysdale	7	4	6	4	6^{4}
