= 1973 U.S. Professional Indoor – Doubles =

Doubles
- 1973 U.S. Professional Indoor

Final
- Champions: (United States) Brian Gottfried (United States) Dick Stockton
- Runners-up: (Australia) Roy Emerson (Australia) Rod Laver
- Score: 4–6, 6–3, 6–4

Details
- Draw: 16
- Seeds: 6

Events
Singles	Doubles
- U.S. Professional Indoor

Arthur Ashe and Robert Lutz were the defending champions, but Ashe did not participate this year. Lutz partnered Stan Smith, losing in the semifinals.

Brian Gottfried and Dick Stockton won the title, defeating Roy Emerson and Rod Laver 4–6, 6–3, 6–4 in the final.

== Seeds ==
1. (Australia) Roy Emerson / (Australia) Rod Laver (final)
2. (Socialist Federal Republic of Yugoslavia) Nikola Pilić / (Australia) Allan Stone (quarterfinals)
3. (Australia) Terry Addison / (Australia) Colin Dibley (quarterfinals)
4. (Sweden) Ove Nils Bengtson / (United States) Jim McManus (first round)
5. (South Africa) Robert Maud / (United States) Andrew Pattison (semifinals)
6. (United States) Brian Gottfried / (United States) Dick Stockton (champions)

== Draw ==
Key

- Q = Qualifier
- WC = Wild card
- LL = Lucky loser
- Alt = Alternate
- ITF = ITF entry
- PR = Protected ranking
- SR = Special ranking
- SE = Special exempt
- JE = Junior exempt
- JR = Junior Accelerator Programme entrant
- CO = College Accelerator Programme entrant
- NG = Next Gen Accelerator Program entrant
- w/o = Walkover
- r = Retired
- d = Defaulted

=== Draw ===
First round
1	(Australia) R Emerson (Australia) R Laver	4	6	6
(Brazil) JE Mandarino (United States) H Solomon	6	2	1
(United States) F Froehling (United States) C Pasarell	6	7
(Australia) J Alexander (Australia) P Dent	4	6
3	(Australia) T Addison (Australia) C Dibley	w/o
(South Africa) C Drysdale (United States) C Richey
(Czechoslovakia) M Holeček (New Zealand) O Parun	7	5	3
5	(South Africa) R Maud (United States) A Pattison	6	7	6
6	(United States) B Gottfried (United States) D Stockton	w/o
(South Africa) B Hewitt (South Africa) F McMillan
(Chile) P Cornejo (Chile) J Fillol	6	6
4	(Sweden) ON Bengtson (United States) J McManus	3	2
(United States) R Lutz (United States) S Smith	6	6
(United Kingdom) G Battrick (Australia) B Phillips-Moore	1	3
(United States) R Barth (United States) T Edlefsen	6	6
2	(Socialist Federal Republic of Yugoslavia) N Pilić (Australia) A Stone	7	7

Quarterfinals
1	(Australia) R Emerson (Australia) R Laver	6	6
(United States) F Froehling (United States) C Pasarell	2	2
3	(Australia) T Addison (Australia) C Dibley	5	2
5	(South Africa) R Maud (United States) A Pattison	7	6
6	(United States) B Gottfried (United States) D Stockton	6	6
(Chile) P Cornejo (Chile) J Fillol	3	3
(United States) R Lutz (United States) S Smith	6	6	6
2	(Socialist Federal Republic of Yugoslavia) N Pilić (Australia) A Stone	4	7	3

Semifinals
1	(Australia) R Emerson (Australia) R Laver	3	7	6
5	(South Africa) R Maud (United States) A Pattison	6	6	2
6	(United States) B Gottfried (United States) D Stockton	7	6
(United States) R Lutz (United States) S Smith	6	3

Final
1	(Australia) R Emerson (Australia) R Laver	6	3	4
6	(United States) B Gottfried (United States) D Stockton	4	6	6
