= U.S. Pro Indoor =

Defunct tennis tournament
- Event name: Philadelphia
- Tour: WCT circuit (1969, 1971–77); Grand Prix Tour (1978–89); ATP Tour (1990–98)
- Founded: 1962
- Abolished: 1998
- Editions: 37
- Location: Philadelphia, PA, U.S.
- Surface: Hard (i) (1993/97–98); Carpet (i) (1968–92/94–96)

The U.S. Professional Indoor Championships, also known as U.S. Pro Indoor, was a professional tennis tournament founded in 1962 as the Philadelphia Invitational Indoor Tennis Championships. The tournament was held in Philadelphia, United States from 1962 to 1998. It played on indoor carpet courts, and indoor hard courts. It was an ILTF sanctioned event from 1962 to 1967 and again in 1970, the World Championship Tennis (WCT) circuit in 1968, 1969 and from 1971 to 1977 and the Grand Prix Tour from 1978 to 1989 before being held on the ATP Tour. It was held annually first at the Spectrum, and then at the CoreStates Center. It was originally named the Philadelphia Indoor Open Tournament prior to the open era.

== History ==
The tournament was founded in 1962 as the Philadelphia Invitational Indoor Tennis Championships. This tournament until 1970 was part of the ILTF World Circuit. In 1964 the tournament was also known as the Philadelphia Indoor Championships. In 1969 the name was changed to the Philadelphia International Indoor Open Championships. In 1970 the tournament was organised by the International Tennis Players Association (founded in 1965 as the International Professional Tennis Players Association) and branded as the International Tennis Players Association Open Indoor or ITPA Open Indoor. In 1971 the tournament was re-branded as the Philadelphia International Indoor Open Championships also called the Philadelphia International Indoor

In 1972 the United States Professional Indoor tennis championships were created in Philadelphia, United States, as part of the WCT circuit, rival of the National Tennis League (NTL). As the first event of the season, the Philadelphia U.S. Professional Indoor attracted all WCT stars at the Philadelphia Spectrum at each of its yearly editions, with Rod Laver, John Newcombe or Marty Riessen winning the event in the early 1970s. After the WCT absorbed the NTL in 1970, the tournament continued to exist within the WCT tour until 1978, when the event officially became part of the Grand Prix Tour, precursor of the current ATP Tour.

As part of the Grand Prix's top tier tournaments until 1986, the Philadelphia event known as the U.S. Pro Indoor since 1973, saw American players dominating the fields in the 1970s and 1980s, with Tim Mayotte reaching four finals, World No. 1s Jimmy Connors and John McEnroe six finals each, and Czechoslovak Ivan Lendl three. In 1985, Swiss watch company Ebel S.A. started its six-year sponsorship of the event, the tournament becoming until 1990 the Ebel U.S. Pro Indoor. The event entered the new ATP circuit in 1990 as part of the Championship Series, to see eighteen-year-old, and future US Open champion Pete Sampras win his first career title against Andrés Gómez.

In 1991, the event lost Ebel's sponsorship, and went back to being the U.S. Pro Indoor for two editions, before Comcast became the sponsor of the event in 1992, effectively saving it from being discontinued. In the following years, the Comcast U.S. Indoor's prize money was reduced to less than a million dollars, preventing the creation of attractive line ups, and gaining the nickname "Comatose U.S. Indoor". In 1997, Advanta, already the sponsor of the 1971-created women's tournament of Philadelphia, the Advanta Championships, since 1995, took upon the sponsorship of the men's event, which also became the Advanta Championships. Pete Sampras won his third and fourth Philadelphia titles in the last two editions of the event, taking place on indoor hard courts at the CoreStates Center, before it was definitely discontinued in 1998.

== Finals ==
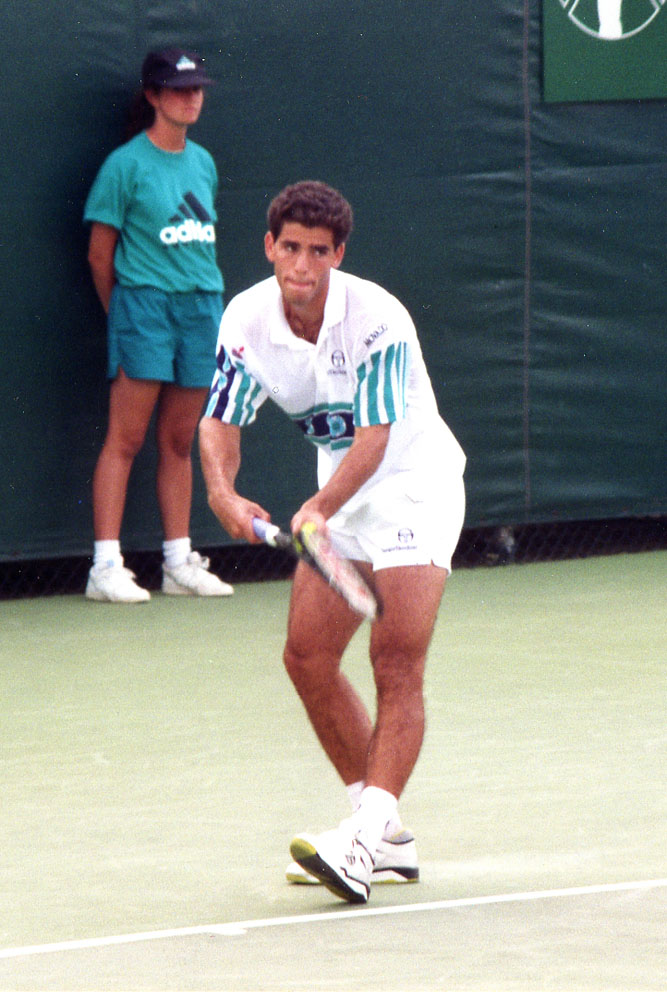
Pete Sampras won his first career singles title in Philadelphia in 1990, defeating Andrés Gómez in the final – he eventually reached four more finals, winning three times

=== Singles ===
Year	Champions	Runners-up	Score
1962	(United States) Jon Douglas	(United States) Ronald Holmberg	5–7, 3–6, 6–1, 6–2, 7–5
1963	(United States) Whitney Reed	(United States) Frank Froehling	4–6, 6–1, 8–6, 6–4
1964	(United States) Chuck McKinley	(Mexico) Rafael Osuna	6–3, 8–6, 5–7, 4–6, 6–3
1965	(United States) Charlie Pasarell	(New Zealand) Ian Crookenden	6–8, 11–9, 8–6, 6–4
1966	(United States) Charlie Pasarell	(United States) Arthur Ashe	13–11, 6–2, 2–6, 9–7
1967	(United States) Arthur Ashe	(United States) Charlie Pasarell	7–5, 9–7, 6–3
1968	(Spain) Manuel Santana	(Denmark) Jan Leschly	8–6, 6–3
1969	(Australia) Rod Laver	(Australia) Tony Roche	7–5, 6–4, 6–4
1970	(Australia) Rod Laver (2)	(Australia) Tony Roche	6–3, 8–6, 6–2
1971	(Australia) John Newcombe	(Australia) Rod Laver	7–6^{(7–5)}, 7–6^{(7–1)}, 6–4
1972	(Australia) Rod Laver (3)	(Australia) Ken Rosewall	4–6, 6–2, 6–2, 6–2
1973	(United States) Stan Smith	(United States) Robert Lutz	7–6^{(7–2)}, 7–6^{(7–5)}, 4–6, 6–4
1974	(Australia) Rod Laver (4)	(United States) Arthur Ashe	6–1, 6–4, 3–6, 6–4
1975	(United States) Marty Riessen	(United States) Vitas Gerulaitis	7–6^{(7–1)}, 5–7, 6–2, 6–7^{(0–7)}, 6–3
1976	(United States) Jimmy Connors	(Sweden) Björn Borg	7–6^{(7–5)}, 6–4, 6–0
1977	(United States) Dick Stockton	(United States) Jimmy Connors	3–6, 6–4, 3–6, 6–1, 6–2
1978	(United States) Jimmy Connors (2)	(United States) Roscoe Tanner	6–2, 6–4, 6–3
1979	(United States) Jimmy Connors (3)	(United States) Arthur Ashe	6–3, 6–4, 6–1
1980	(United States) Jimmy Connors (4)	(United States) John McEnroe	6–3, 2–6, 6–3, 3–6, 6–4
1981	(United States) Roscoe Tanner	(Poland) Wojtek Fibak	6–2, 7–6^{(7–5)}, 7–5
1982	(United States) John McEnroe	(United States) Jimmy Connors	6–3, 6–3, 6–1
1983	(United States) John McEnroe (2)	(Czechoslovakia) Ivan Lendl	4–6, 7–6^{(9–7)}, 6–4, 6–3
1984	(United States) John McEnroe (3)	(Czechoslovakia) Ivan Lendl	6–3, 3–6, 6–3, 7–6^{(7–3)}
1985	(United States) John McEnroe (4)	(Czechoslovakia) Miloslav Mečíř	6–3, 7–6^{(7–5)}, 6–1
1986	(Czechoslovakia) Ivan Lendl	(United States) Tim Mayotte	(walkover)
1987	(United States) Tim Mayotte	(United States) John McEnroe	3–6, 6–1, 6–3, 6–1
1988	(United States) Tim Mayotte (2)	(Australia) John Fitzgerald	4–6, 6–2, 6–2, 6–3
1989	(Germany) Boris Becker	(United States) Tim Mayotte	7–6^{(7–4)}, 6–1, 6–3
1990	(United States) Pete Sampras	(Ecuador) Andrés Gómez	7–6^{(7–4)}, 7–5, 6–2
1991	(Czechoslovakia) Ivan Lendl (2)	(United States) Pete Sampras	5–7, 6–4, 6–4, 3–6, 6–3
1992	(United States) Pete Sampras (2)	(Israel) Amos Mansdorf	6–1, 7–6^{(7–4)}, 2–6, 7–6^{(7–2)}
1993	(Australia) Mark Woodforde	(United States) Ivan Lendl	5–4 (ret.)
1994	(United States) Michael Chang	(Netherlands) Paul Haarhuis	6–3, 6–2
1995	(Sweden) Thomas Enqvist	(United States) Michael Chang	0–6, 6–4, 6–0
1996	(United States) Jim Courier	(United States) Chris Woodruff	6–4, 6–3
1997	(United States) Pete Sampras (3)	(Australia) Patrick Rafter	5–7, 7–6^{(7–4)}, 6–3
1998	(United States) Pete Sampras (4)	(Sweden) Thomas Enqvist	7–5, 7–6^{(7–3)}

=== Doubles ===
Year	Champions	Runners-up	Score
1968	Not held		
1969	(Netherlands) Tom Okker (United States) Marty Riessen	(Australia) John Newcombe (Australia) Tony Roche	8–6, 6–4
1970	(Romania) Ilie Năstase (Romania) Ion Țiriac	(United States) Arthur Ashe (United States) Dennis Ralston	6–4, 6–3
1971	Competition stopped at the quarterfinals stage		
1972	(United States) Arthur Ashe (United States) Robert Lutz	(Australia) John Newcombe (Australia) Tony Roche	6–3, 6–7, 6–3
1973	(United States) Brian Gottfried (United States) Dick Stockton	(Australia) Roy Emerson (Australia) Rod Laver	4–6, 6–3, 6–4
1974	(South Africa) Pat Cramer (United States) Mike Estep	(France) Jean-Baptiste Chanfreau (France) Georges Goven	6–1, 6–1
1975	(United States) Brian Gottfried (Mexico) Raúl Ramírez	(United States) Dick Stockton (United States) Erik van Dillen	3–6, 6–3, 7–6^{(7–4)}
1976	(Australia) Rod Laver (United States) Dennis Ralston	(South Africa) Bob Hewitt (South Africa) Frew McMillan	7–6^{(8–6)}, 7–6^{(7–3)}
1977	(South Africa) Bob Hewitt (South Africa) Frew McMillan	(Poland) Wojtek Fibak (Netherlands) Tom Okker	6–1, 1–6, 6–3
1978	(South Africa) Bob Hewitt (South Africa) Frew McMillan	(United States) Vitas Gerulaitis (United States) Sandy Mayer	6–4, 6–4
1979	(Poland) Wojtek Fibak (Netherlands) Tom Okker	(United States) Peter Fleming (United States) John McEnroe	5–7, 6–1, 6–3
1980	(United States) Peter Fleming (United States) John McEnroe	(United States) Brian Gottfried (Mexico) Raúl Ramírez	6–3, 7–6
1981	(United States) Sherwood Stewart (United States) Marty Riessen	(United States) Brian Gottfried (Mexico) Raúl Ramírez	6–2, 6–2
1982	(United States) Peter Fleming (United States) John McEnroe	(United States) Sherwood Stewart (United States) Ferdi Taygan	7–6, 6–4
1983	(South Africa) Kevin Curren (United States) Steve Denton	(United States) Peter Fleming (United States) John McEnroe	6–4, 7–6
1984	(United States) Peter Fleming (United States) John McEnroe	(France) Henri Leconte (France) Yannick Noah	6–2, 6–3
1985	(Sweden) Mats Wilander (Sweden) Joakim Nyström	(Poland) Wojtek Fibak (United States) Sandy Mayer	3–6, 6–2, 6–2
1986	(United States) Scott Davis (United States) David Pate	(Sweden) Stefan Edberg (Sweden) Anders Järryd	7–6, 3–6, 6–3, 7–5
1987	(Spain) Sergio Casal (Spain) Emilio Sánchez	(South Africa) Christo Steyn (South Africa) Danie Visser	3–6, 6–1, 7–6
1988	(New Zealand) Kelly Evernden (United States) Johan Kriek	(United States) Kevin Curren (South Africa) Danie Visser	7–6, 6–3
1989	(United States) Paul Annacone (South Africa) Christo van Rensburg	(United States) Rick Leach (United States) Jim Pugh	6–3, 7–5
1990	(United States) Rick Leach (United States) Jim Pugh	(Canada) Grant Connell (Canada) Glenn Michibata	3–6, 6–4, 6–2
1991	(United States) Rick Leach (United States) Jim Pugh	(Germany) Udo Riglewski (Germany) Michael Stich	6–4, 6–4
1992	(Australia) Todd Woodbridge (Australia) Mark Woodforde	(United States) Jim Grabb (United States) Richey Reneberg	6–4, 7–6
1993	(United States) Jim Grabb (United States) Richey Reneberg	(South Africa) Marcos Ondruska (United States) Brad Pearce	6–7, 6–3, 6–0
1994	(Netherlands) Paul Haarhuis (Netherlands) Jacco Eltingh	(United States) Jim Grabb (United States) Jared Palmer	6–3, 6–4
1995	(United States) Jim Grabb (United States) Jonathan Stark	(Netherlands) Paul Haarhuis (Netherlands) Jacco Eltingh	7–6, 6–7, 6–3
1996	(Australia) Todd Woodbridge (Australia) Mark Woodforde	(Zimbabwe) Byron Black (Canada) Grant Connell	7–6, 6–2
1997	(Canada) Sébastien Lareau (United States) Alex O'Brien	(South Africa) Ellis Ferreira (United States) Patrick Galbraith	6–3, 6–3
1998	(Netherlands) Jacco Eltingh (Netherlands) Paul Haarhuis	(Australia) David Macpherson (United States) Richey Reneberg	7–6, 6–7, 6–2

== Records ==
=== Singles ===
Most titles	(Australia) Rod Laver	4
Most titles	(United States) Jimmy Connors	4
Most titles	(United States) John McEnroe	4
Most titles	(United States) Pete Sampras	4
Most finals	(United States) Jimmy Connors	6
Most finals	(United States) John McEnroe	6
Most consecutive titles	(United States) John McEnroe (1982–1985)	4
Most consecutive finals	(United States) Jimmy Connors (1976–1980)	5

== Event names ==
A chronological list of this tournaments names:

- Philadelphia Invitational Indoor Tennis Championships (1962–1965)
- Philadelphia International Indoor Championships (1966–1968)
- International Tennis Players Association Open Indoor (1970)
- Philadelphia International Indoor Open Championships (1969, 1971)
- U.S. Professional Indoor (1972–1984)
- Ebel U.S. Pro Indoor (1985–1990)
- U.S. Pro Indoor (1991–1992)
- Comcast U.S. Indoor (1993-1996)
- Advanta Championships (1997–1998)

== See also ==
- Marilyn Fernberger
- U.S. National Indoor Championships
