= 1975 World Championship Tennis circuit =

Male tennis circuit

- Ashe left with President Reagan in July 1982

Details
- Duration: 20 January 1975 – 7 May 1975
- Edition: 8th
- Tournaments: 26

Achievements (singles)
- Most titles: (United States) Arthur Ashe (5)
- Most finals: (United States) Arthur Ashe (7)
- Points leader: (United States) Arthur Ashe (760)

The 1975 World Championship Tennis circuit was one of the two rival professional male tennis circuits of 1975. It was organized by World Championship Tennis (WCT). The 1975 circuit divided the players in three groups, Red, Blue and Green who played 24 tournaments in 12 countries. The first tournament, U.S. Professional Indoor Championships, was a combined event as was the season's final which was played in Dallas by the eight best performers and was won by American Arthur Ashe who defeated Björn Borg from Sweden in four sets.

Additionally there were three special non–ranking events; the CBS Classic (Puerto Rico, 13–19 January), the Aetna World Cup team contest between Australia and America (Hartford, 6–9 March) and the Rothmans International Trophy an eight-nation contest between 16 players (London, 4–8 March).

The total prize money for the 1975 WCT circuit was $2,068,500 which included $100,000 bonus money.

== Overview ==
Week	Tournament	Location	Champions	Runners-up	Score
20 Jan	U.S. Pro Indoor	Philadelphia, Pennsylvania, U.S.	(United States) Marty Riessen	(United States) Vitas Gerulaitis	7–6^{(7–1)}, 5–7, 6–2, 6–7^{(0–7)}, 6–3
27 Jan	Fidelity Tournament	Richmond, Virginia, U.S.	(Sweden) Björn Borg	(United States) Arthur Ashe	4–6, 6–4, 6–4
3 Feb	St. Petersburg WCT	St. Petersburg, Florida, U.S.	(Mexico) Raúl Ramírez	(United States) Roscoe Tanner	6–0, 1–6, 6–2
6 Feb	WCT International	Bologna, Italy	(Sweden) Björn Borg	(United States) Arthur Ashe	7–6^{(7–4)}, 4–6, 7–6^{(7–4)}
10 Feb	Rothmans Toronto WCT	Toronto, Canada	(United States) Harold Solomon	(United States) Stan Smith	6–4, 6–1
17 Feb	Fort Worth WCT	Fort Worth, Texas, U.S.	(United States) John Alexander	(United States) Dick Stockton	7–6, 4–6, 6–3
17 Feb	Michelob Pro–Celebrity Classic	La Costa, California, U.S.	(Australia) Rod Laver	(Australia) Allan Stone	6–2, 6–2
17 Feb	Barcelona WCT	Barcelona, Spain	(United States) Arthur Ashe	(Sweden) Björn Borg	7–6, 6–3
23 Feb	San Antonio WCT	San Antonio, Texas, U.S.	(United States) Dick Stockton	(United States) Stan Smith	7–5, 2–6, 7–6^{(8–6)}
25 Feb	Rotterdam WTT	Rotterdam, Netherlands	(United States) Arthur Ashe	(Netherlands) Tom Okker	3–6, 6–2, 6–4
10 Mar	Washington WCT	Washington, D.C., U.S.	(United Kingdom) Mark Cox	(United States) Dick Stockton	6–2, 7–6
10 Mar	São Paulo WCT	São Paulo, Brazil	(Australia) Rod Laver	(United States) Charlie Pasarell	6–4, 6–4
10 Mar	Munich WCT	Munich, West Germany	(United States) Arthur Ashe	(Sweden) Björn Borg	6–4, 7–6
17 Mar	Memphis WCT	Memphis, Tennessee, U.S.	(United States) Harold Solomon	(Czechoslovakia) Jiří Hřebec	2–6, 6–1, 6–4
17 Mar	Caracas WCT	Caracas, Venezuela	(Australia) Rod Laver	(Mexico) Raúl Ramírez	7–6, 6–2
23 Mar	Monte Carlo WCT	Roquebrune-Cap-Martin, France	(Spain) Manuel Orantes	(South Africa) Bob Hewitt	6–2, 6–4
24 Mar	Atlanta WCT	Atlanta, Georgia, U.S.	(United Kingdom) Mark Cox	(United States) John Alexander	6–3, 7–6
24 Mar	Orlando WCT	Orlando, Florida, U.S.	(Australia) Rod Laver	(United States) Vitas Gerulaitis	6–3, 6–4
7 Apr	St. Louis WCT	St. Louis, Missouri, U.S.	(United States) Vitas Gerulaitis	(United States) Roscoe Tanner	2–6, 6–2, 6–3
11 Apr	Johannesburg WCT	Johannesburg, South Africa	(United Kingdom) Buster Mottram	(Netherlands) Tom Okker	6–4, 6–2
14 Apr	Tokyo WCT	Tokyo, Japan	(United States) Bob Lutz	(United States) Stan Smith	6–4, 6–4
14 Apr	Denver WCT	Denver, Colorado, U.S.	(United States) Jimmy Connors	(United States) Brian Gottfried	6–3, 6–4
21 Apr	Houston	Houston, Texas, U.S.	(Australia) Ken Rosewall	(South Africa) Cliff Drysdale	6–3, 3–6, 6–1
21 Apr	Charlotte WCT	Charlotte, North Carolina, U.S.	(Mexico) Raúl Ramírez	(United States) Roscoe Tanner	3–6, 6–4, 6–3
21 Apr	Stockholm WCT	Stockholm, Sweden	(United States) Arthur Ashe	(Netherlands) Tom Okker	6–4, 6–2
7 May	Dallas WCT Finals	Dallas, Texas, U.S.	(United States) Arthur Ashe	(Sweden) Björn Borg	3–6, 6–4, 6–4, 6–0

== Schedule ==
This is the complete schedule of events on the 1975 WCT circuit, with player progression documented until the quarterfinals stage.

=== January ===
Week	Tournament	Champions	Runners-up	Semifinalists	Quarterfinalists
20 Jan	U.S. Pro Indoor; Philadelphia, United States; Carpet (i) – $115,000 – 128S/64D; Singles – Doubles	(United States) Marty Riessen; 7–6^{(7–1)}, 5–7, 6–2, 6–7^{(0–7)}, 6–3	(United States) Vitas Gerulaitis	(Chile) Jaime Fillol (United States) John Alexander	(Australia) Tony Roche (United States) Paul Gerken (United States) Arthur Ashe (United States) Cliff Richey
20 Jan	U.S. Pro Indoor; Philadelphia, United States; Carpet (i) – $115,000 – 128S/64D; Singles – Doubles	(United States) Brian Gottfried (Mexico) Raúl Ramírez; 3–6, 6–3, 7–6^{(7–4)}	(United States) Dick Stockton (United States) Erik van Dillen	(Chile) Jaime Fillol (United States) John Alexander	(Australia) Tony Roche (United States) Paul Gerken (United States) Arthur Ashe (United States) Cliff Richey
27 Jan	Fidelity Tournament; Richmond, United States; Green group Carpet (i) – $60,000 – 32S/16D; Singles – Doubles	(Sweden) Björn Borg; 4–6, 6–4, 6–4	(United States) Arthur Ashe	(Australia) Kim Warwick (Netherlands) Tom Okker	(United States) Jeff Borowiak (Italy) Adriano Panatta (New Zealand) Onny Parun (Australia) Bob Giltinan
27 Jan	Fidelity Tournament; Richmond, United States; Green group Carpet (i) – $60,000 – 32S/16D; Singles – Doubles	(United States) Fred McNair (Austria) Hans Kary; 7–6^{(8–6)}, 5–7, 7–6^{(8–6)}	(Italy) Paolo Bertolucci (Italy) Adriano Panatta	(Australia) Kim Warwick (Netherlands) Tom Okker	(United States) Jeff Borowiak (Italy) Adriano Panatta (New Zealand) Onny Parun (Australia) Bob Giltinan

=== February ===
Week	Tournament	Champions	Runners-up	Semifinalists	Quarterfinalists
3 Feb	Havatampa–Raymond James Classic; St. Petersburg, United States; Hard – $60,000 – 32S/16D; Blue group	(Mexico) Raúl Ramírez; 6–0, 1–6, 6–2	(United States) Roscoe Tanner	(Australia) Rod Laver (Australia) Geoff Masters	(Chile) Jaime Fillol (United States) Sandy Mayer (United States) Brian Gottfried (Rhodesia) Andrew Pattison
3 Feb	Havatampa–Raymond James Classic; St. Petersburg, United States; Hard – $60,000 – 32S/16D; Blue group	(United States) Brian Gottfried (Mexico) Raúl Ramírez; 6–4, 6–4	(United States) Charlie Pasarell (United States) Roscoe Tanner	(Australia) Rod Laver (Australia) Geoff Masters	(Chile) Jaime Fillol (United States) Sandy Mayer (United States) Brian Gottfried (Rhodesia) Andrew Pattison
6 Feb	WCT International; Bologna, Italy; Carpet (i) – $60,000 – 32S/16D; Green group Singles – Doubles	(Sweden) Björn Borg; 7–6^{(7–4)}, 4–6, 7–6^{(7–4)}	(United States) Arthur Ashe	(Netherlands) Tom Okker (South Africa) Bob Hewitt	(Socialist Federal Republic of Yugoslavia) Niki Pilić (New Zealand) Onny Parun (Australia) Bob Giltinan (Italy) Adriano Panatta
6 Feb	WCT International; Bologna, Italy; Carpet (i) – $60,000 – 32S/16D; Green group Singles – Doubles	(Italy) Paolo Bertolucci (Italy) Adriano Panatta; 6–3, 3–6, 6–3	(United States) Arthur Ashe (Netherlands) Tom Okker	(Netherlands) Tom Okker (South Africa) Bob Hewitt	(Socialist Federal Republic of Yugoslavia) Niki Pilić (New Zealand) Onny Parun (Australia) Bob Giltinan (Italy) Adriano Panatta
10 Feb	Rothmans Toronto WCT; Toronto, Canada; Carpet (i) – $60,000 – 32S/16D; Red group	(United States) Harold Solomon; 6–4, 6–1	(United States) Stan Smith	(United States) Erik van Dillen (United States) Marty Riessen	(United States) Paul Gerken (United States) Cliff Richey (United States) Bob Lutz (Australia) Phil Dent
10 Feb	Rothmans Toronto WCT; Toronto, Canada; Carpet (i) – $60,000 – 32S/16D; Red group	(United States) Dick Stockton (United States) Erik van Dillen; 6–4, 7–5, 6–1	(India) Vijay Amritraj (India) Ashok Amritraj	(United States) Erik van Dillen (United States) Marty Riessen	(United States) Paul Gerken (United States) Cliff Richey (United States) Bob Lutz (Australia) Phil Dent
17 Feb	Fort Worth WCT; Fort Worth, United States; Hard – $60,000 – 32S/16D; Red group	(Australia) John Alexander; 7–6^{(7–2)}, 4–6, 6–3	(United States) Dick Stockton	(South Africa) Cliff Drysdale (India) Vijay Amritraj	(United States) Harold Solomon (United Kingdom) Mark Cox (Czechoslovakia) Jiří Hřebec (Czechoslovakia) Milan Holeček
17 Feb	Fort Worth WCT; Fort Worth, United States; Hard – $60,000 – 32S/16D; Red group	(United States) Bob Lutz (United States) Stan Smith; 6–7, 7–6, 6–3	(Australia) John Alexander (Australia) Phil Dent	(South Africa) Cliff Drysdale (India) Vijay Amritraj	(United States) Harold Solomon (United Kingdom) Mark Cox (Czechoslovakia) Jiří Hřebec (Czechoslovakia) Milan Holeček
17 Feb	Michelob Pro–Celebrity Classic; Carlsbad, United States; Hard – $60,000 – 32S/16D; Blue group	(Australia) Rod Laver; 6–2, 6–2	(Australia) Allan Stone	(United States) Roscoe Tanner (Soviet Union) Alex Metreveli	(Egypt) Ismail El Shafei (Australia) Ross Case (Australia) Geoff Masters (South Africa) Raymond Moore
17 Feb	Michelob Pro–Celebrity Classic; Carlsbad, United States; Hard – $60,000 – 32S/16D; Blue group	(United States) Brian Gottfried (Mexico) Raúl Ramírez; 7–5, 6–4	(United States) Charlie Pasarell (United States) Roscoe Tanner	(United States) Roscoe Tanner (Soviet Union) Alex Metreveli	(Egypt) Ismail El Shafei (Australia) Ross Case (Australia) Geoff Masters (South Africa) Raymond Moore
17 Feb	Barcelona WCT; Barcelona, Spain; Carpet (i) – $60,000 – 32S/16D; Green group	(United States) Arthur Ashe; 7–6, 6–3	(Sweden) Björn Borg	(New Zealand) Onny Parun (Spain) José Higueras	(United States) Steve Krulevitz (South Africa) Bob Hewitt (Sweden) Kjell Johansson (Australia) Kevin Warwick
17 Feb	Barcelona WCT; Barcelona, Spain; Carpet (i) – $60,000 – 32S/16D; Green group	(United States) Arthur Ashe (Netherlands) Tom Okker; 7–5, 6–1	(Italy) Paolo Bertolucci (Italy) Adriano Panatta	(New Zealand) Onny Parun (Spain) José Higueras	(United States) Steve Krulevitz (South Africa) Bob Hewitt (Sweden) Kjell Johansson (Australia) Kevin Warwick
23 Feb	San Antonio Tennis Classic; San Antonio, United States; Hard – $60,000 – 32S/16D; Red group	(United States) Dick Stockton; 7–5, 2–6, 7–6^{(8–6)}	(United States) Stan Smith	(Australia) John Alexander (United States) Bob Lutz	(United States) Paul Gerken (United States) Mike Estep (United States) Marty Riessen (Australia) Phil Dent
23 Feb	San Antonio Tennis Classic; San Antonio, United States; Hard – $60,000 – 32S/16D; Red group	(Australia) John Alexander (Australia) Phil Dent; 7–6, 4–6, 6–4	(United Kingdom) Mark Cox (South Africa) Cliff Drysdale	(Australia) John Alexander (United States) Bob Lutz	(United States) Paul Gerken (United States) Mike Estep (United States) Marty Riessen (Australia) Phil Dent
24 Feb	Rotterdam WTT; Rotterdam, Netherlands; Carpet (i) – $60,000 – 32S/16D; Green group Singles – Doubles	(United States) Arthur Ashe; 3–6, 6–2, 6–4	(Netherlands) Tom Okker	(France) Patrice Dominguez (Sweden) Björn Borg	(South Africa) Bob Hewitt (United States) Steve Krulevitz (Australia) Kevin Warwick (South Africa) Frew McMillan
24 Feb	Rotterdam WTT; Rotterdam, Netherlands; Carpet (i) – $60,000 – 32S/16D; Green group Singles – Doubles	(South Africa) Bob Hewitt (South Africa) Frew McMillan; 6–2, 6–2	(Spain) José Higueras (Hungary) Balázs Taróczy	(France) Patrice Dominguez (Sweden) Björn Borg	(South Africa) Bob Hewitt (United States) Steve Krulevitz (Australia) Kevin Warwick (South Africa) Frew McMillan

=== March ===
Week	Tournament	Champions	Runners-up	Semifinalists	Quarterfinalists
10 Mar	Xerox Tennis Classic; Washington, D.C., United States; Hard – $60,000 – 32S/16D; Red group	(United Kingdom) Mark Cox; 6–2, 7–6	(United States) Dick Stockton	(United States) Stan Smith (Pakistan) Haroon Rahim	(Australia) John Alexander (United States) Bob Lutz (Australia) Phil Dent (United States) Eddie Dibbs
10 Mar	Xerox Tennis Classic; Washington, D.C., United States; Hard – $60,000 – 32S/16D; Red group	(United States) Mike Estep (New Zealand) Jeff Simpson; 7–6, 6–3	(India) Vijay Amritraj (India) Ashok Amritraj	(United States) Stan Smith (Pakistan) Haroon Rahim	(Australia) John Alexander (United States) Bob Lutz (Australia) Phil Dent (United States) Eddie Dibbs
10 Mar	São Paulo WCT; São Paulo, Brazil; Carpet (i) – $60,000 – 32S/16D; Blue group	(Australia) Rod Laver; 6–4, 6–4	(United States) Charlie Pasarell	(Brazil) Thomas Koch (United States) Roscoe Tanner	(United States) Vitas Gerulaitis (Soviet Union) Alex Metreveli (Australia) Ray Ruffels (New Zealand) Brian Fairlie
10 Mar	São Paulo WCT; São Paulo, Brazil; Carpet (i) – $60,000 – 32S/16D; Blue group	(Australia) Ross Case (Australia) Geoff Masters; 6–7, 7–6, 7–6	(United States) Brian Gottfried (Mexico) Raúl Ramírez	(Brazil) Thomas Koch (United States) Roscoe Tanner	(United States) Vitas Gerulaitis (Soviet Union) Alex Metreveli (Australia) Ray Ruffels (New Zealand) Brian Fairlie
10 Mar	Munich WCT; Munich, West Germany; Carpet (i) – $60,000 – 32S/16D; Green group Singles	(United States) Arthur Ashe; 6–4, 7–6	(Sweden) Björn Borg	(Socialist Federal Republic of Yugoslavia) Niki Pilić (United Kingdom) Buster Mottram	(Sweden) Kjell Johansson (Hungary) Balázs Taróczy (Italy) Corrado Barazzutti (South Africa) Bob Hewitt
10 Mar	Munich WCT; Munich, West Germany; Carpet (i) – $60,000 – 32S/16D; Green group Singles	(South Africa) Bob Hewitt (South Africa) Frew McMillan; 6–3, 6–4	(Italy) Corrado Barazzutti (Italy) Antonio Zugarelli	(Socialist Federal Republic of Yugoslavia) Niki Pilić (United Kingdom) Buster Mottram	(Sweden) Kjell Johansson (Hungary) Balázs Taróczy (Italy) Corrado Barazzutti (South Africa) Bob Hewitt
17 Mar	Memphis WCT; Memphis, United States; Carpet (i) – $60,000 – 32S/16D; Red group	(United States) Harold Solomon; 2–6, 6–1, 6–4	(Czechoslovakia) Jiří Hřebec	(Australia) John Alexander (United Kingdom) Mark Cox	(United States) Cliff Richey (India) Vijay Amritraj (United States) Bob Lutz (Australia) Phil Dent
17 Mar	Memphis WCT; Memphis, United States; Carpet (i) – $60,000 – 32S/16D; Red group	(United States) Dick Stockton (United States) Erik van Dillen; 1–6, 7–5, 6–4	(United Kingdom) Mark Cox (South Africa) Cliff Drysdale	(Australia) John Alexander (United Kingdom) Mark Cox	(United States) Cliff Richey (India) Vijay Amritraj (United States) Bob Lutz (Australia) Phil Dent
17 Mar	Caracas WCT; Caracas, Venezuela; Hard – $60,000 – 32S/16D; Blue group	(Australia) Rod Laver; 7–6, 6–2	(Mexico) Raúl Ramírez	(United States) Jeff Borowiak (United States) Roscoe Tanner	(Egypt) Ismail El Shafei (Australia) Allan Stone (South Africa) Raymond Moore (Australia) Roy Emerson
17 Mar	Caracas WCT; Caracas, Venezuela; Hard – $60,000 – 32S/16D; Blue group	(Australia) Ross Case (Australia) Geoff Masters; 7–5, 4–6, 6–2	(United States) Brian Gottfried (Mexico) Raúl Ramírez	(United States) Jeff Borowiak (United States) Roscoe Tanner	(Egypt) Ismail El Shafei (Australia) Allan Stone (South Africa) Raymond Moore (Australia) Roy Emerson
23 Mar	Monte Carlo WCT; Monte Carlo, Monaco; Clay – $60,000 – 32S/16D; Green group	(Spain) Manuel Orantes; 6–2, 6–4	(South Africa) Bob Hewitt	(Spain) José Higueras (United Kingdom) John Lloyd	(Australia) Dick Crealy (Italy) Adriano Panatta (United Kingdom) Buster Mottram (Sweden) Björn Borg
23 Mar	Monte Carlo WCT; Monte Carlo, Monaco; Clay – $60,000 – 32S/16D; Green group	(South Africa) Bob Hewitt (South Africa) Frew McMillan; 6–3, 6–2	(United States) Arthur Ashe (Netherlands) Tom Okker	(Spain) José Higueras (United Kingdom) John Lloyd	(Australia) Dick Crealy (Italy) Adriano Panatta (United Kingdom) Buster Mottram (Sweden) Björn Borg
24 Mar	First National Bank Classic; Atlanta, United States; Carpet (i) – $60,000 – 32S/16D; Red group	(United Kingdom) Mark Cox; 6–3, 7–6^{(7–3)}	(Australia) John Alexander	(United States) Cliff Richey (United States) Harold Solomon	(United States) Stan Smith (Australia) Phil Dent (United States) Dick Stockton (Czechoslovakia) Milan Holeček
24 Mar	First National Bank Classic; Atlanta, United States; Carpet (i) – $60,000 – 32S/16D; Red group	(India) Vijay Amritraj (India) Ashok Amritraj; 6–3, 6–2	(United Kingdom) Mark Cox (South Africa) Cliff Drysdale	(United States) Cliff Richey (United States) Harold Solomon	(United States) Stan Smith (Australia) Phil Dent (United States) Dick Stockton (Czechoslovakia) Milan Holeček
24 Mar	Orlando WCT; Orlando, United States; Hard – $60,000 – 32S/16D; Blue group	(Australia) Rod Laver; 6–3, 6–4	(United States) Vitas Gerulaitis	(United States) Brian Gottfried (Rhodesia) Andrew Pattison	(United States) Jeff Borowiak (United States) Roscoe Tanner (Mexico) Raúl Ramírez (Australia) Allan Stone
24 Mar	Orlando WCT; Orlando, United States; Hard – $60,000 – 32S/16D; Blue group	(United States) Brian Gottfried (Mexico) Raúl Ramírez; 6–4, 6–4	(Australia) Colin Dibley (Australia) Ray Ruffels	(United States) Brian Gottfried (Rhodesia) Andrew Pattison	(United States) Jeff Borowiak (United States) Roscoe Tanner (Mexico) Raúl Ramírez (Australia) Allan Stone

=== April ===
Week	Tournament	Champions	Runners-up	Semifinalists	Quarterfinalists
7 Apr	St. Louis Tennis Classic; St. Louis, United States; Carpet (i) – $60,000 – 32S/16D; Blue group	(United States) Vitas Gerulaitis; 2–6, 6–2, 6–3	(United States) Roscoe Tanner	(Australia) Rod Laver (United States) Brian Gottfried	(United States) Jeff Borowiak (New Zealand) Brian Fairlie (Chile) Jaime Fillol (Mexico) Raúl Ramírez
7 Apr	St. Louis Tennis Classic; St. Louis, United States; Carpet (i) – $60,000 – 32S/16D; Blue group	(Australia) Colin Dibley (Australia) Ray Ruffels; 6–4, 6–4	(Australia) Ross Case (Australia) Geoff Masters	(Australia) Rod Laver (United States) Brian Gottfried	(United States) Jeff Borowiak (New Zealand) Brian Fairlie (Chile) Jaime Fillol (Mexico) Raúl Ramírez
11 Apr	Johannesburg WCT; Johannesburg, South Africa; Hard – $60,000 – 32S/16D; Green group	(United Kingdom) Buster Mottram; 6–4, 6–2	(Netherlands) Tom Okker	(Sweden) Björn Borg (South Africa) Frew McMillan	(South Africa) Bob Hewitt (New Zealand) Onny Parun (Australia) Kevin Warwick (United States) Arthur Ashe
11 Apr	Johannesburg WCT; Johannesburg, South Africa; Hard – $60,000 – 32S/16D; Green group	(United States) Arthur Ashe (Netherlands) Tom Okker; 6–3, 6–2	(South Africa) Bob Hewitt (South Africa) Frew McMillan	(Sweden) Björn Borg (South Africa) Frew McMillan	(South Africa) Bob Hewitt (New Zealand) Onny Parun (Australia) Kevin Warwick (United States) Arthur Ashe
14 Apr	Kawasaki Classic; Tokyo, Japan; Carpet (i) – $60,000 – 32S/16D; Red group	(United States) Bob Lutz; 6–4, 6–4	(United States) Stan Smith	(Australia) John Alexander (United Kingdom) Mark Cox	(United States) Harold Solomon (United States) Dick Stockton (South Africa) Cliff Drysdale (United States) Marty Riessen
14 Apr	Kawasaki Classic; Tokyo, Japan; Carpet (i) – $60,000 – 32S/16D; Red group	(United States) Bob Lutz (United States) Stan Smith; 6–4, 6–7^{(6–8)}, 6–2	(Australia) John Alexander (Australia) Phil Dent	(Australia) John Alexander (United Kingdom) Mark Cox	(United States) Harold Solomon (United States) Dick Stockton (South Africa) Cliff Drysdale (United States) Marty Riessen
14 Apr	Denver WCT; Denver, United States; Carpet (i) – $60,000 – 32S/16D; Blue group	(United States) Jimmy Connors; 6–3, 6–4	(United States) Brian Gottfried	(United States) Sandy Mayer (Egypt) Ismail El Shafei	(Brazil) Thomas Koch (Mexico) Raúl Ramírez (United States) Vitas Gerulaitis (Chile) Jaime Fillol
14 Apr	Denver WCT; Denver, United States; Carpet (i) – $60,000 – 32S/16D; Blue group	(Australia) Roy Emerson (Australia) Rod Laver; 6–2, 3–6, 7–5	(Australia) Bob Carmichael (Australia) Allan Stone	(United States) Sandy Mayer (Egypt) Ismail El Shafei	(Brazil) Thomas Koch (Mexico) Raúl Ramírez (United States) Vitas Gerulaitis (Chile) Jaime Fillol
21 Apr	Houston WCT; Houston, United States; Clay – $60,000 – 32S/16D; Red group	(Australia) Ken Rosewall; 6–3, 3–6, 6–1	(South Africa) Cliff Drysdale	(United States) Harold Solomon (India) Vijay Amritraj	(Australia) John Alexander (Australia) Phil Dent (United States) Bob Lutz (United States) Eddie Dibbs
21 Apr	Houston WCT; Houston, United States; Clay – $60,000 – 32S/16D; Red group	(United States) Bob Lutz (United States) Stan Smith; 7–5, 7–6	(United States) Mike Estep (New Zealand) Russell Simpson	(United States) Harold Solomon (India) Vijay Amritraj	(Australia) John Alexander (Australia) Phil Dent (United States) Bob Lutz (United States) Eddie Dibbs
21 Apr	Charlotte WCT; Charlotte, United States; Clay – $60,000 – 32S/16D; Blue group	(Mexico) Raúl Ramírez; 3–6, 6–4, 6–3	(United States) Roscoe Tanner	(Australia) Rod Laver (Rhodesia) Andrew Pattison	(Colombia) Iván Molina (Chile) Jaime Fillol (New Zealand) Brian Fairlie (United States) Brian Gottfried
21 Apr	Charlotte WCT; Charlotte, United States; Clay – $60,000 – 32S/16D; Blue group	(Chile) Patricio Cornejo (Chile) Jaime Fillol; 6–3, 5–7, 6–4	(Egypt) Ismail El Shafei (New Zealand) Brian Fairlie	(Australia) Rod Laver (Rhodesia) Andrew Pattison	(Colombia) Iván Molina (Chile) Jaime Fillol (New Zealand) Brian Fairlie (United States) Brian Gottfried
21 Apr	Stockholm WCT; Stockholm, Sweden; Carpet (i) – $60,000 – 32S/16D; Green group	(United States) Arthur Ashe; 6–4, 6–2	(Netherlands) Tom Okker	(New Zealand) Onny Parun (United States) Fred McNair	(United Kingdom) Buster Mottram (Spain) José Higueras (Italy) Corrado Barazzutti (Sweden) Tenny Svensson
21 Apr	Stockholm WCT; Stockholm, Sweden; Carpet (i) – $60,000 – 32S/16D; Green group	(United States) Arthur Ashe (Netherlands) Tom Okker; 6–3, 7–6	(France) Patrice Dominguez (Australia) Kevin Warwick	(New Zealand) Onny Parun (United States) Fred McNair	(United Kingdom) Buster Mottram (Spain) José Higueras (Italy) Corrado Barazzutti (Sweden) Tenny Svensson

=== May ===
Week	Tournament	Champions	Runners-up	Semifinalists	Quarterfinalists
7 May	WCT Finals; Dallas, United States; WCT Finals; Carpet – $100,000 – 8S; Singles	(United States) Arthur Ashe; 3–6, 6–4, 6–4, 6–0	(Sweden) Björn Borg	(Australia) John Alexander (Australia) Rod Laver	(United Kingdom) Mark Cox (Mexico) Raúl Ramírez (United States) Roscoe Tanner (United States) Harold Solomon

== Standings ==
=== Blue group ===
Player	Tournaments played	Tournaments won	Matches won	Matches lost	Points	Prize money
(Australia) Rod Laver ^{*}	9	4	30	5	700	$109,731
(United States) Roscoe Tanner ^{*}	9	0	25	9	590	$52,962
(Mexico) Raúl Ramírez ^{*}	9	2	22	7	550	$86,680
(United States) Brian Gottfried	9	0	19	9	450	$68,300
(United States) Vitas Gerulaitis	6	1	19	5	420	$40,300
(Chile) Jaime Fillol	9	0	14	9	390	$22,200
(Australia) Allan Stone	9	0	10	9	350	$19,000
(Rhodesia) Andrew Pattison	9	0	11	9	420	$26,328
(United States) Jeff Borowiak	9	0	11	9	330	$22,610
(Egypt) Ismail El Shafei	9	0	11	9	330	$15,600

=== Green group ===
Player	Tournaments played	Tournaments won	Matches won	Matches lost	Points	Prize money
(United States) Arthur Ashe ^{*}	9	4	35	5	760	$177,161
(Sweden) Björn Borg ^{*}	9	2	27	7	640	$78,140
(Netherlands) Tom Okker	8	0	19	8	470	$41,292
(United Kingdom) Buster Mottram	9	1	15	8	400	$27,250
(South Africa) Bob Hewitt	8	0	15	8	395	$33,370
(New Zealand) Onny Parun	8	0	13	8	350	$18,250
(Australia) Kim Warwick	8	0	12	8	340	$18,700
(Spain) José Higueras	9	0	9	9	330	$16,750
(France) Patrice Dominguez	9	0	9	9	290	$13,350
(Australia) Bob Giltinan	9	0	8	9	280	$11,930

=== Red group ===
Player	Tournaments played	Tournaments won	Matches won	Matches lost	Points	Prize money
(Australia) John Alexander ^{*}	9	1	26	8	610	$94,075
(United States) Harold Solomon ^{*}	9	2	22	7	540	$46,950
(United Kingdom) Mark Cox ^{*}	9	2	22	7	520	$75,822
(United States) Stan Smith	9	0	19	9	500	$46,189
(United States) Dick Stockton	9	1	19	8	490	$60,275
(United States) Bob Lutz	9	1	19	7	470	$41,647
(Australia) Phil Dent	9	0	14	9	390	$25,200
(South Africa) Cliff Drysdale	9	0	14	9	390	$40,408
(India) Vijay Amritraj	9	0	11	9	350	$25,750
(United States) Marty Riessen	9	0	8	9	350	$42,259

^{*} Qualified for the WCT Finals. The best two players from each group qualified plus the next two players with the highest points total.

== See also ==
- 1975 Grand Prix circuit
- 1975 USLTA-IPA Indoor Circuit
