= 1975 Barcelona WCT =

Tennis tournament

- Date: 17–23 February
- Edition: 3rd
- Category: World Championship Tennis (WCT)
- Draw: 32S / 16D
- Prize money: $60,000
- Surface: Carpet / indoor
- Location: Barcelona, Spain

Champions

Singles
- (United States) Arthur Ashe

Doubles
- (United States) Arthur Ashe / (Netherlands) Tom Okker
← 1974 ·	Barcelona WCT	· 1976 →

The 1975 Barcelona WCT was a men's tennis tournament played on indoor carpet courts in Barcelona, Spain. The tournament was part of Green Group of the 1975 World Championship Tennis circuit. It was the third edition of the event and was held from 17 February through 23 February 1975. Second-seeded Arthur Ashe won the singles title.

== Finals ==
=== Singles ===
(United States) Arthur Ashe defeated (Sweden) Björn Borg 6–4, 7–6

=== Doubles ===
(United States) Arthur Ashe / (Netherlands) Tom Okker defeated (Italy) Paolo Bertolucci / (Italy) Adriano Panatta 7–5, 6–1

== See also ==
- 1975 Torneo Godó
