= 1975 Munich WCT – Singles =

Tennis tournament event

Singles
- 1975 Munich WCT
- Final date: 10 Mar - 16 Mar 1975

Final
- Champion: (United States) Arthur Ashe
- Runner-up: (Sweden) Björn Borg
- Score: 6–4, 7–6

Details
- Draw: 32
- Seeds: 8

Events
| Singles | Doubles |
| ← 1974 · | Munich WCT | · 1976 → |

The 1975 Munich WCT – Singles was an event of the 1975 Munich WCT tennis tournament and was played in Munich, West Germany from 10 March until 16 March 1975. The draw comprised 32 players and eight of them were seeded. Frew McMillan was the defending champion, but lost in the first round. First-seeded Arthur Ashe won the singles title, defeating Björn Borg in the final, 6–4, 7–6.

== Seeds ==
1. (United States) Arthur Ashe (champion)
2. (Sweden) Björn Borg (final)
3. (withdrew)
4. (South Africa) Bob Hewitt (quarterfinals)
5. (Australia) Kim Warwick (second round)
6. (New Zealand) Onny Parun (first round)
7. (Australia) Bob Giltinan (second round)
8. (France) Patrice Dominguez (first round)

== Draw ==
=== Key ===
- Q = Qualifier
- WC = Wild card
- LL = Lucky loser
- Alt = Alternate
- SE = Special exempt
- PR = Protected ranking
- ITF = ITF entry
- JE = Junior exempt
- w/o = Walkover
- r = Retired
- d = Defaulted
- SR = Special ranking

=== Finals ===
Semifinals
2 | (Sweden) Björn Borg | 6 | 7
(United Kingdom) Buster Mottram | 3 | 5
(Socialist Federal Republic of Yugoslavia) Nikola Pilić | 6 | 3 | 4
1 | (United States) Arthur Ashe | 3 | 6 | 6

Final
2 | (Sweden) Björn Borg | 4 | 6^{6}
1 | (United States) Arthur Ashe | 6 | 7^{8}

=== Top half ===
First Round
2 | (Sweden) Björn Borg | 6^{5} | 6 | 6
(South Africa) Frew McMillan | 7^{7} | 3 | 1
(Australia) Dick Crealy | 6 | 3 | 6
Q | (West Germany) Reinhart Probst | 2 | 6 | 3
Q | (West Germany) Lindorff | 5 | 1
(Italy) Tonino Zugarelli | 7 | 6
(Hungary) Balázs Taróczy | 6 | 6
6 | (New Zealand) Onny Parun | 4 | 4
8 | (France) Patrice Dominguez | 3 | 3
(United Kingdom) Buster Mottram | 6 | 6
(United Kingdom) John Lloyd | 6 | 7^{8}
(United States) Steve Krulevitz | 2 | 6^{6}
(United States) Dick Dell | 6^{4} | 7 | 6^{6}
(Australia) Syd Ball | 7^{7} | 5 | 7^{8}
(Austria) Hans Kary | 4 | 6 | 0
4 | (South Africa) Bob Hewitt | 6 | 3 | 6

Second Round
2 | (Sweden) Björn Borg | 6 | 6
(Australia) Dick Crealy | 4 | 2
(Italy) Tonino Zugarelli | 2 | 6^{4}
(Hungary) Balázs Taróczy | 6 | 7^{7}
(United Kingdom) Buster Mottram | 5 | 6 | 7^{7}
(United Kingdom) John Lloyd | 7 | 4 | 6^{5}
(Australia) Syd Ball | 3 | 4
4 | (South Africa) Bob Hewitt | 6 | 6

Quarterfinals
2 | (Sweden) Björn Borg | 6 | 6
(Hungary) Balázs Taróczy | 2 | 4
(United Kingdom) Buster Mottram | 6 | 6
4 | (South Africa) Bob Hewitt | 4 | 4

Semifinals
2 | (Sweden) Björn Borg | 6 | 7
(United Kingdom) Buster Mottram | 3 | 5

=== Bottom half ===
First Round
5 | (Australia) Kim Warwick | 6 | 7^{7}
Q | (West Germany) Florian Merkel | 3 | 6^{1}
(Italy) Corrado Barazzutti | 6 | 6
WC | (West Germany) Gunther Gnettner | 2 | 1
(France) Pierre Barthès | 3 | 4
(Socialist Federal Republic of Yugoslavia) Nikola Pilić | 6 | 6
(United States) Fred McNair | 4 | 4
7 | (Australia) Bob Giltinan | 6 | 6
(Spain) José Higueras | 3 | 6 | 7
WC | (West Germany) Max Wünschig | 6 | 2 | 5
Q | (United States) Don Brosseau | 0 | 2
(Sweden) Kjell Johansson | 6 | 6
(United States) Sherwood Stewart | 5 | 0^{r}
(West Germany) Hans-Jürgen Pohmann | 7 | 1
(Socialist Federal Republic of Yugoslavia) Željko Franulović | 6^{2} | 6^{1}
1 | (United States) Arthur Ashe | 7^{7} | 7^{7}

Second Round
5 | (Australia) Kim Warwick | 3 | 3
(Italy) Corrado Barazzutti | 6 | 6
(Socialist Federal Republic of Yugoslavia) Nikola Pilić | 6 | 7^{7}
7 | (Australia) Bob Giltinan | 2 | 6^{3}
(Spain) José Higueras | 6 | 3 | 2
(Sweden) Kjell Johansson | 3 | 6 | 6
(West Germany) Hans-Jürgen Pohmann | 1 | 3
1 | (United States) Arthur Ashe | 6 | 6

Quarterfinals
(Italy) Corrado Barazzutti | 4 | 3
(Socialist Federal Republic of Yugoslavia) Nikola Pilić | 6 | 6
(Sweden) Kjell Johansson | 4 | 3
1 | (United States) Arthur Ashe | 6 | 6

Semifinals
(Socialist Federal Republic of Yugoslavia) Nikola Pilić | 6 | 3 | 4
1 | (United States) Arthur Ashe | 3 | 6 | 6
