= 1975 World Championship Tennis Finals =

- Date: May 7 – 11
- Edition: 5th
- Category: World Championship Tennis
- Draw: 8S
- Prize money: $100,000
- Surface: Carpet / indoor
- Location: Dallas, Texas, USA
- Venue: Moody Coliseum

Champions

Singles
- (United States) Arthur Ashe
← 1974 ·	WCT Finals	· 1976 →

The 1975 World Championship Tennis Finals was a men's tennis tournament played on indoor carpet courts. It was the 5th edition of the WCT Finals and was part of the 1975 World Championship Tennis circuit. The event was played at the Moody Coliseum in Dallas, Texas in the United States and was held from May 7 through May 11, 1975. The draw consisted of the eight best performing players of the 1975 WCT season. First-seeded Arthur Ashe won the tournament and the accompanying $50,000 first-prize money.

== Final ==
=== Singles ===
(United States) Arthur Ashe defeated (Sweden) Björn Borg 3–6, 6–4, 6–4, 6–0

- It was Ashe's 5th title of the year, his first WCT Finals title and the 32nd of his career.

== See also ==
- 1975 WCT World Doubles
