= 1974 Barcelona WCT =

- Date: 25 February – 3 March
- Edition: 2nd
- Category: World Championship Tennis (WCT)
- Draw: 32S / 16D
- Prize money: $50,000
- Surface: Carpet / indoor
- Location: Barcelona, Spain

Champions

Singles
- (United States) Arthur Ashe

Doubles
- (United States) Arthur Ashe / (United States) Roscoe Tanner
← 1971 ·	Barcelona WCT	· 1975 →

The 1974 Barcelona WCT was a men's tennis tournament played on indoor carpet courts in Barcelona, Spain. The tournament was part of Green Group of the 1974 World Championship Tennis circuit. It was the second edition of the event and was held from 25 February through 3 March 1974. First-seeded Arthur Ashe won the singles title.

== Finals ==
=== Singles ===
(United States) Arthur Ashe defeated (Sweden) Björn Borg 6–4, 3–6, 6–3

=== Doubles ===
(United States) Arthur Ashe / (United States) Roscoe Tanner defeated (United States) Tom Edlefsen / (United States) Tom Leonard 6–3, 6–4

== See also ==
- 1974 Torneo Godó
