= Macon Open (tennis) =

Defunct tennis tournament
- Event name: Macon Open
- Tour: USLTA indoor circuit World Championship Tennis
- Founded: 1968
- Abolished: 1972
- Editions: 5
- Location: Macon, Georgia, US
- Venue: Macon Coliseum
- Surface: Carpet (indoor)

The Macon Open also known as the Macon Indoor and Macon International Tennis Tournament is a defunct men's tennis tournament played from 1968 to 1972. It was held in at the Macon Coliseum in Macon, Georgia in the United States and played on indoor carpet courts. From 1968 through 1971 the tournament was part of the USLTA Indoor Circuit while the last edition in 1972 was part of the World Championship Tennis (WCT) circuit.

== Finals ==
=== Singles ===
Year	Champions	Runners-up	Score	Ref
1968	(Denmark) Jan Leschly	(United Kingdom) Mike Sangster	6–3, 6–4, 5–7, 6–4	
1969	(Spain) Manuel Orantes	(United Kingdom) Mark Cox	10–8, 7–5, 4–6, 9–7	
1970	(United States) Cliff Richey	(United States) Arthur Ashe	3–6, 6–3, 8–6	
1971	(Socialist Federal Republic of Yugoslavia) Željko Franulović	(Romania) Ilie Năstase	6–4, 7–5, 5–7, 3–6, 7–6	
1972	(United Kingdom) Mark Cox	(Australia) Roy Emerson	6–3, 6–7^{(9–11)}, 6–3	

=== Doubles ===
Year	Champions	Runners-up	Score	Ref
1970	(Australia) Terry Addison (Australia) Bob Carmichael	(Romania) Ilie Năstase (Romania) Ion Țiriac	14–16, 6–4, 8–6	
1971	(United States) Clark Graebner (Brazil) Thomaz Koch	(Socialist Federal Republic of Yugoslavia) Željko Franulović (Czech Republic) Jan Kodeš	6–3, 7–6	
1972	(Australia) Roy Emerson (Netherlands) Tom Okker	(United Kingdom) Mark Cox (United Kingdom) Graham Stilwell	7–6, 6–2	

== See also ==
- Tennis Classic of Macon – women's ITF tournament
