= 1975 WCT World Doubles =

- Date: April 30 – May 4 (May 12)
- Edition: 3rd
- Category: World Championship Tennis
- Draw: 8
- Prize money: $100,000
- Surface: Carpet / indoor
- Location: Mexico City, Mexico

Champions

Doubles
- (United States) Brian Gottfried / (Mexico) Raúl Ramírez
- WCT World Doubles

The 1975 WCT World Doubles was a men's tennis tournament played on indoor carpet courts in Mexico City, Mexico that was part of the 1975 World Championship Tennis circuit. It was the tour finals for the doubles season of the WCT Tour. The tournament was held from April 30 through May 4, 1975. Title holders Bob Hewitt and Frew McMillan had qualified for the tournament but were not allowed to compete by the Mexican authorities in an apparent protest against South Africa's apartheid policy. They were replaced by Vijay and Anand Amritraj.

== Final ==
=== Doubles ===
(United States) Brian Gottfried / (Mexico) Raúl Ramírez defeated (United Kingdom) Mark Cox / (South Africa) Cliff Drysdale 7–6^{(8–6)}, 6–7^{(7–5)}, 6–2, 7–6^{(8–6)}

==== Special match ====
As Hewitt and McMillan were unable to compete in Mexico a special match for the title was played on May 12 in Dallas, U.S.:
(United States) Brian Gottfried / Raúl Ramírez defeated (South Africa) Bob Hewitt / (South Africa) Frew McMillan 7–5, 6–3, 4–6, 2–6, 7–5
