= 1976 La Costa Pro-Celebrity Tennis Classic =

- Date: March 16–21
- Edition: 4th
- Category: IPA
- Draw: 16S / 8D
- Prize money: $100,000
- Surface: Hard / outdoor
- Location: La Costa, California, U.S.
- Venue: La Costa Racquet Club

Champions

Singles
- (Romania) Ilie Năstase

Doubles
- (United States) Marty Riessen / (United States) Roscoe Tanner
- La Costa WCT

The 1976 La Costa Pro-Celebrity Tennis Classic, was a men's tennis tournament played on outdoor hard courts at the La Costa Racquet Club in La Costa, California in the United States. The tournament was part of 1976 Independent Players Association circuit organized by Bill Riordan. Previously the tournament had been part of the World Championship Tennis (WCT) circuit, but it was left off the schedule for the 1976 WCT season. It was the fourth edition of the event and was held from March 16 through March 21 (Note: The singles final was played on Saturday, March 20, while the doubles final and a third-place playoff match were held on Sunday, March 21, 1976.), 1976. Third-seeded Ilie Năstase won the singles title and earned $30,000 first-prize money. Nastase had to pay a $6,000 fine to the Canadian Tennis Association to lift a ban that was put into effect the day before the tournament started.

== Finals ==
=== Singles ===
(Romania) Ilie Năstase defeated (United States) Jimmy Connors 4–6, 6–0, 6–1

- It was Nastase's 3rd singles title of the year and the 56th of his career.

=== Doubles ===
(United States) Marty Riessen / (United States) Roscoe Tanner defeated (United States) Peter Fleming / (United States) Gene Mayer 7–6, 7–6
