= 1975 First National Bank Classic =

- Date: March 24–30
- Edition: 4th
- Category: World Championship Tennis (WCT)
- Draw: 32S / 16D
- Prize money: $60,000
- Surface: Carpet / indoor
- Location: Atlanta, Georgia, US
- Venue: Alexander Memorial Coliseum

Champions

Singles
- (United Kingdom) Mark Cox

Doubles
- (India) Vijay Amritraj / (India) Ashok Amritraj
← 1974 ·	Atlanta WCT	· 1976 →

The 1975 First National Bank Classic, also known as the Atlanta WCT, was a men's tennis tournament played on indoor carpet courts at the Alexander Memorial Coliseum in Atlanta, Georgia in the United States that was part of the Red Group of the 1975 World Championship Tennis circuit. It was the fourth edition of the tournament and was held from March 24 through March 30, 1975. Fifth-seeded Mark Cox won the singles title and the accompanying $12,000 first-prize money

== Finals ==
=== Singles ===
(United Kingdom) Mark Cox defeated (Australia) John Alexander 6–3, 7–6^{(7–3)}

- It was Cox's 3rd singles title of the year and the 17th of his career in the Open Era.

=== Doubles ===
(India) Vijay Amritraj / (India) Ashok Amritraj defeated (United Kingdom) Mark Cox / (South Africa) Cliff Drysdale 6–3, 6–2
