= 1976 Torneo Godó =

- Date: 18–24 October
- Edition: 24th
- Category: Grand Prix – Three Star
- Draw: 64S / 32D
- Prize money: $100,000
- Surface: Clay / outdoor
- Location: Barcelona, Spain
- Venue: Real Club de Tenis Barcelona

Champions

Singles
- (Spain) Manuel Orantes

Doubles
- (United States) Brian Gottfried / (Mexico) Raúl Ramírez
- Torneo Godó

The 1976 Torneo Godó or Trofeo Conde de Godó was a men's tennis tournament that took place on outdoor clay courts at the Real Club de Tenis Barcelona in Barcelona in Spain. It was the 24th edition of the Torneo Godó tournament and was part of the Three Star category of the 1976 Grand Prix circuit. It was held from 18 October through 24 October 1976. Fourth-seeded Manuel Orantes won the singles title.

== Finals ==
=== Singles ===
(Spain) Manuel Orantes defeated (United States) Eddie Dibbs 6–1, 2–6, 2–6, 7–5, 6–4

- It was Orantes' 6th singles title of the year and the 28th of his career.

=== Doubles ===
(United States) Brian Gottfried / (Mexico) Raúl Ramírez defeated (South Africa) Bob Hewitt / (South Africa) Frew McMillan 7–6, 6–4

== See also ==
- 1976 Barcelona WCT
