= 1976 Barcelona WCT =

- Date: 2–7 February
- Edition: 4th
- Category: World Championship Tennis (WCT)
- Draw: 16S / 8D
- Prize money: $60,000
- Surface: Carpet / indoor
- Location: Barcelona, Spain

Champions

Singles
- (United States) Eddie Dibbs

Doubles
- (United States) Bob Lutz / (United States) Stan Smith
- Barcelona WCT

The 1976 Barcelona WCT was a men's tennis tournament played on indoor carpet courts in Barcelona, Catalonia, Spain. The tournament was part of the 1976 World Championship Tennis circuit. It was the fourth and final edition of the event and was held from 2 February through 7 February 1976. Second-seeded Eddie Dibbs won the singles title.

== Finals ==
=== Singles ===
(United States) Eddie Dibbs defeated (South Africa) Cliff Drysdale 6–1, 6–1

- It was Dibbs' 2nd singles title of the year and the 8th of his career.

=== Doubles ===
(United States) Bob Lutz / (United States) Stan Smith defeated (Poland) Wojciech Fibak / (West Germany) Karl Meiler 6–3, 6–3

== See also ==
- 1976 Torneo Godó
