= 1975 Munich WCT =

- Date: 10–16 March
- Edition: 3rd
- Category: World Championship Tennis (WCT)
- Draw: 32S / 16D
- Prize money: $60,000
- Surface: Carpet / indoor
- Location: Munich, West Germany

Champions

Singles
- (United States) Arthur Ashe

Doubles
- (South Africa) Bob Hewitt / (South Africa) Frew McMillan
- Munich WCT

The 1975 Munich WCT was a men's tennis tournament played on indoor carpet courts in Munich, West Germany. The tournament was part of Green Group of the 1975 World Championship Tennis circuit. It was the third edition of the event and was held from 10 March through 16 March 1975. First-seeded Arthur Ashe won the singles title.

== Finals ==
=== Singles ===
(United States) Arthur Ashe defeated (Sweden) Björn Borg 6–4, 7–6

=== Doubles ===
(South Africa) Bob Hewitt / (South Africa) Frew McMillan defeated (Italy) Corrado Barazzutti / (Italy) Antonio Zugarelli 6–3, 6–4

== See also ==
- 1975 Bavarian Tennis Championships
