= 1975 ABN World Tennis Tournament – Doubles =

Doubles
- 1975 ABN World Tennis Tournament

Final
- Champion: (South Africa) Bob Hewitt (South Africa) Frew McMillan
- Runner-up: (Spain) José Higueras (Hungary) Balázs Taróczy
- Score: 6–2, 6–2

Details
- Draw: 16
- Seeds: 4

Events
Singles	Doubles
- ABN World Tennis Tournament

The 1975 ABN World Tennis Tournament – Doubles was an event of the 1975 ABN World Tennis Tournament men's tennis tournament that was played at Rotterdam Ahoy in Rotterdam, Netherlands from 24 February until 2 March 1975. The draw comprised 16 teams of which four were seeded. Second-seeded Bob Hewitt and Frew McMillan were the defending doubles champions and successfully defended the title, defeating unseeded José Higueras and Balázs Taróczy in the final, 6–2, 6–2.

== Seeds ==
1. (Italy) Paolo Bertolucci / (Italy) Adriano Panatta (first round)
2. (South Africa) Bob Hewitt / (South Africa) Frew McMillan (champions)
3. (Austria) Hans Kary / (United States) Fred McNair (quarterfinals)
4. (United States) Arthur Ashe / (Netherlands) Tom Okker (semifinals)

== Draw ==
Key

- Q = Qualifier
- WC = Wild card
- LL = Lucky loser
- Alt = Alternate
- ITF = ITF entry
- PR = Protected ranking
- SR = Special ranking
- SE = Special exempt
- JE = Junior exempt
- JR = Junior Accelerator Programme entrant
- CO = College Accelerator Programme entrant
- NG = Next Gen Accelerator Program entrant
- w/o = Walkover
- r = Retired
- d = Defaulted

First Round
1	(Italy) Paolo Bertolucci (Italy) Adriano Panatta	7	4	4
(Spain) José Higueras (Hungary) Balázs Taróczy	5	6	6
(Netherlands) Louk Sanders (Netherlands) Rolf Thung	3	6	4
(Australia) Dick Crealy (Rhodesia) Andrew Pattison	6	3	6
(Sweden) Björn Borg (Sweden) Kjell Johansson	6	6
(Netherlands) Jan Hordijk (Netherlands) Fred Hemmes Sr.	1	3
(Australia) Syd Ball (Australia) Bob Giltinan	4	2
3	(Austria) Hans Kary (United States) Fred McNair	6	6
4	(United States) Arthur Ashe (Netherlands) Tom Okker	6	6
(Italy) Corrado Barazzutti (Italy) Tonino Zugarelli	3	2
(Socialist Federal Republic of Yugoslavia) Željko Franulović (Socialist Federal Republic of Yugoslavia) Nikola Pilić	4	4
(France) Patrice Dominguez (Australia) Kim Warwick	6	6
(United States) Dick Dell (United States) Sherwood Stewart	6	2	4
(United States) Steve Krulevitz (United Kingdom) John Lloyd	3	6	6
(United Kingdom) Buster Mottram (West Germany) Hans-Jürgen Pohmann	6	3	2
2	(South Africa) Bob Hewitt (South Africa) Frew McMillan	2	6	6

Quarterfinals
(Spain) José Higueras (Hungary) Balázs Taróczy	7^{7}	4	6
(Australia) Dick Crealy (Rhodesia) Andrew Pattison	6^{5}	6	4
(Sweden) Björn Borg (Sweden) Kjell Johansson	7^{7}	6
3	(Austria) Hans Kary (United States) Fred McNair	6^{2}	3
4	(United States) Arthur Ashe (Netherlands) Tom Okker	6	6
(France) Patrice Dominguez (Australia) Kim Warwick	2	0
(United States) Steve Krulevitz (United Kingdom) John Lloyd	1	0
2	(South Africa) Bob Hewitt (South Africa) Frew McMillan	6	6

Semifinals
(Spain) José Higueras (Hungary) Balázs Taróczy	6	6
(Sweden) Björn Borg (Sweden) Kjell Johansson	3	4
4	(United States) Arthur Ashe (Netherlands) Tom Okker	4	0
2	(South Africa) Bob Hewitt (South Africa) Frew McMillan	6	6

Final
(Spain) José Higueras (Hungary) Balázs Taróczy	2	2
2	(South Africa) Bob Hewitt (South Africa) Frew McMillan	6	6
