= 1975 Charlotte Tennis Classic =

- Date: April 21–27
- Edition: 5th
- Category: World Championship Tennis
- Draw: 32S / 16D
- Prize money: $60,000
- Surface: Clay / outdoor
- Location: Charlotte, North Carolina, U.S.
- Venue: Olde Providence Racquet Club

Champions

Singles
- (Mexico) Raúl Ramírez

Doubles
- (Chile) Patricio Cornejo / (Chile) Jaime Fillol
← 1974 ·	Carolinas International Tennis Tournament	· 1976 →

The 1975 Charlotte Tennis Classic, also known by its sponsored name North Carolina National Bank Tennis Classic, was a men's tennis tournament played on outdoor clay courts that was part of the World Championship Tennis (WCT) circuit. It was the fifth edition of the tournament and was held from April 21 through April 27, 1975 at the Julian J. Clark Tennis Stadium, owned by the Olde Providence Racquet Club in Charlotte, North Carolina in the United States. Third-seeded Raúl Ramírez won the singles title.

== Finals ==
=== Singles ===
(Mexico) Raúl Ramírez defeated (United States) Roscoe Tanner 3–6, 6–4, 6–3

- It was Ramírez' 2nd singles title of the year and the 5th of his career.

=== Doubles ===
(Chile) Patricio Cornejo / (Chile) Jaime Fillol defeated (Egypt) Ismail El Shafei / (New Zealand) Brian Fairlie 6–3, 5–7, 6–4
