= 1973 Munich WCT =

- Date: 2 –8 April
- Edition: 1st
- Category: World Championship Tennis (WCT)
- Draw: 32S / 16D
- Prize money: $50,000
- Surface: Carpet / indoor
- Location: Munich, West Germany

Champions

Singles
- (United States) Stan Smith

Doubles
- (Australia) John Alexander / (Australia) Phil Dent
- Munich WCT

The 1973 Munich WCT, also known as the German Professional Championships, was a men's tennis tournament played on indoor carpet courts in Munich, West Germany. The tournament was part of Group A of the 1973 World Championship Tennis circuit. It was the inaugural edition of the event and was held from 2 April until 8 April 1973. First-seeded Stan Smith won the singles title.

== Finals ==
=== Singles ===
(United States) Stan Smith defeated (United States) Cliff Richey 6–1, 7–5

=== Doubles ===
(Socialist Federal Republic of Yugoslavia) Niki Pilić / (Australia) Allan Stone defeated (South Africa) Cliff Drysdale / (United States) Cliff Richey 7–5, 5–7, 6–4
