= 1975 Michelob Pro–Celebrity Classic =

- Date: February 17–23
- Edition: 3rd
- Category: World Championship Tennis (WCT)
- Draw: 32S / 16D
- Prize money: $60,000
- Surface: Hard / outdoor
- Location: La Costa, California, U.S.
- Venue: La Costa County Club

Champions

Singles
- (Australia) Rod Laver

Doubles
- (United States) Brian Gottfried / (Mexico) Raúl Ramírez
- La Costa WCT

The 1975 Michelob Pro–Celebrity Classic, also known as the La Costa WCT, was a men's tennis tournament played on outdoor hard courts at the La Costa County Club in La Costa, California in the United States. The tournament was part of Blue Group of the 1975 World Championship Tennis circuit. It was the third edition of the event and was held from February 17 through February 23, 1975. Fifth-seeded Rod Laver won the singles title and earned $12,000 first-prize money.

== Finals ==
=== Singles ===
(Australia) Rod Laver defeated (Australia) Allan Stone 6–2, 6–2

=== Doubles ===
(United States) Brian Gottfried / (Mexico) Raúl Ramírez defeated (United States) Charlie Pasarell / (United States) Roscoe Tanner 7–5, 6–4
