= 1975 ABN World Tennis Tournament – Singles =

Singles
- 1975 ABN World Tennis Tournament

Final
- Champion: (United States) Arthur Ashe
- Runner-up: (Netherlands) Tom Okker
- Score: 3–6, 6–2, 6–4

Details
- Draw: 32
- Seeds: 8

Events
| Singles | Doubles |
- ABN World Tennis Tournament

Tom Okker was the defending champion of the singles event at the ABN World Tennis Tournament, but lost in the final to first seeded Arthur Ashe 3–6, 6–2, 6–4.

== Seeds ==
1. (United States) Arthur Ashe (champion)
2. (Sweden) Björn Borg (semifinals)
3. (Netherlands) Tom Okker (final)
4. (Australia) Bob Giltinan (second round)
5. (Rhodesia) Andrew Pattison (second round)
6. (Italy) Adriano Panatta (first round)
7. (South Africa) Bob Hewitt (quarterfinals)
8. (Australia) Kim Warwick (quarterfinals)

== Draw ==
=== Finals ===
Semifinals
1 | (United States) Arthur Ashe | 6 | 6
(France) Patrice Dominguez | 1 | 4
3 | (Netherlands) Tom Okker | 6 | 7
2 | (Sweden) Björn Borg | 3 | 5

Final
1 | (United States) Arthur Ashe | 3 | 6 | 6
3 | (Netherlands) Tom Okker | 6 | 2 | 4

=== Upper half ===
First round
1 | (United States) Arthur Ashe | 6 | 6
(United Kingdom) John Lloyd | 4 | 1
(United States) Sherwood Stewart | 6 | 3 | 6
(Italy) Antonio Zugarelli | 1 | 6 | 0
(Australia) Dick Crealy | 6 | 6
(Socialist Federal Republic of Yugoslavia) Nikola Pilić | 4 | 4
(United States) Dick Dell | 1 | 0
7 | (South Africa) Bob Hewitt | 6 | 6
8 | (Australia) Kim Warwick | 6 | 6
(United States) Fred McNair | 1 | 2
(Australia) Syd Ball | 6 | 6
(Netherlands) Fred Hemmes Sr. | 1 | 3
(Socialist Federal Republic of Yugoslavia) Željko Franulović | 6 | 3 | 2
(France) Patrice Dominguez | 3 | 6 | 6
(Netherlands) Louk Sanders | 7 | 3 | 2
4 | (Australia) Bob Giltinan | 5 | 6 | 6

Second round
1 | (United States) Arthur Ashe | 6^{5} | 6 | 6
(United States) Sherwood Stewart | 7 | 4 | 3
(Australia) Dick Crealy | 5 | 2
7 | (South Africa) Bob Hewitt | 7 | 6
8 | (Australia) Kim Warwick | 7 | 6
(Australia) Syd Ball | 6^{3} | 4
(France) Patrice Dominguez | 6 | 7
4 | (Australia) Bob Giltinan | 3 | 5

Quarterfinals
1 | (United States) Arthur Ashe | 6 | 4 | 6
7 | (South Africa) Bob Hewitt | 3 | 6 | 1
8 | (Australia) Kim Warwick | 3 | 6^{4}
(France) Patrice Dominguez | 6 | 7

Semifinals
1 | (United States) Arthur Ashe | 6 | 6
(France) Patrice Dominguez | 1 | 4

=== Lower half ===
First round
3 | (Netherlands) Tom Okker | 6 | 6
(Hungary) Balázs Taróczy | 3 | 2
(Austria) Hans Kary | 6 | 6
(West Germany) Hans-Jürgen Pohmann | 2 | 4
(United States) Steve Krulevitz | 6 | 7
(Italy) Paolo Bertolucci | 4 | 5
(United Kingdom) Buster Mottram | 6 | 6
6 | (Italy) Adriano Panatta | 4 | 2
5 | (Rhodesia) Andrew Pattison | 6 | 6
(Netherlands) Jan Hordijk | 2 | 0
(South Africa) Frew McMillan | 6^{5} | 6 | 6
(Italy) Corrado Barazzutti | 7 | 3 | 2
(Netherlands) Rolf Thung | 3 | 6 | 7
(Spain) José Higueras | 6 | 4 | 5
(Sweden) Kjell Johansson | 2 | 3
2 | (Sweden) Björn Borg | 6 | 6

Second round
3 | (Netherlands) Tom Okker | 6 | 6
(Austria) Hans Kary | 3 | 3
(United States) Steve Krulevitz | 7 | 6
(United Kingdom) Buster Mottram | 6^{4} | 4
5 | (Rhodesia) Andrew Pattison | 4 | 7 | 6^{4}
(South Africa) Frew McMillan | 6 | ^{1} | 7
(Netherlands) Rolf Thung | 4 | 3
2 | (Sweden) Björn Borg | 6 | 6

Quarterfinals
3 | (Netherlands) Tom Okker | 6 | 6
(United States) Steve Krulevitz | 3 | 4
(South Africa) Frew McMillan | 6 | 2 | 1
2 | (Sweden) Björn Borg | 4 | 6 | 6

Semifinals
3 | (Netherlands) Tom Okker | 6 | 7
2 | (Sweden) Björn Borg | 3 | 5
