= 1975 São Paulo WCT =

- Date: 10–16 March
- Edition: 2nd
- Category: World Championship Tennis (WCT)
- Draw: 32S / 16D
- Prize money: $60,000
- Surface: Carpet / indoor
- Location: São Paulo, Brazil
- Venue: Ibirapuera Gymnasium

Champions

Singles
- (Australia) Rod Laver

Doubles
- (Australia) Ross Case / (Australia) Geoff Masters
- São Paulo WCT

The 1975 São Paulo WCT was a men's tennis tournament played on indoor carpet courts at the Ibirapuera Gymnasium in São Paulo, Brazil. The tournament was part of Blue Group of the 1975 World Championship Tennis circuit. It was the second edition of the event and was held from 10 March through 16 March 1975. First-seeded Rod Laver won the singles title and earned $12,000 first-prize money.

== Finals ==
=== Singles ===
(Australia) Rod Laver defeated (United States) Charlie Pasarell 6–2, 3–6, 6–3

- It was Laver's 3rd singles title of the year and the 71st of his career in the Open Era.

=== Doubles ===
(Australia) Ross Case / (Australia) Geoff Masters defeated (Sweden) Brian Gottfried / (Mexico) Raúl Ramírez 6–7, 7–6, 7–6

- It was Case's 1st doubles title of the year and the 8th of his career. It was Masters 1st doubles title of the year and the 7th of his career.
