= Munich WCT =

Defunct tennis tournament
- Tour: WCT tour
- Founded: 1973
- Abolished: 1983
- Editions: 5
- Location: Munich, West Germany
- Surface: Carpet / indoor

The Munich WCT was a men's tennis tournament played in Munich, West Germany from 1973–1975 and 1982-1983. The event was part of the World Championship Tennis (WCT) circuit and was held on indoor carpet courts.

== Finals ==
=== Singles ===
Year	Champions	Runners-up	Score
1973	(United States) Stan Smith	(United States) Cliff Richey	6–1, 7–5
1974	(South Africa) Frew McMillan	(Socialist Federal Republic of Yugoslavia) Niki Pilić	6–7, 7–6, 7–6
1975	(United States) Arthur Ashe	(Sweden) Björn Borg	6–4, 7–6
1982	(Czechoslovakia) Ivan Lendl	(Czechoslovakia) Tomáš Šmíd	3–6, 6–3, 6–1, 6–2
1983	(United States) Brian Teacher	(United States) Mark Dickson	1–6, 6–4, 6–2, 6–3

=== Doubles ===
Year	Champions	Runners-up	Score
1973	(Socialist Federal Republic of Yugoslavia) Niki Pilić (Australia) Allan Stone	(South Africa) Cliff Drysdale (United States) Cliff Richey	7–5, 5–7, 6–4
1974	(South Africa) Bob Hewitt (South Africa) Frew McMillan	(France) Pierre Barthès (Romania) Ilie Năstase	6–2, 7–6
1975	(South Africa) Bob Hewitt (South Africa) Frew McMillan	(Italy) Corrado Barazzutti (Italy) Antonio Zugarelli	6–3, 6–4
1982	(Australia) Mark Edmondson (Czechoslovakia) Tomáš Šmíd	(South Africa) Kevin Curren (United States) Steve Denton	4–6, 7–5, 6–2
1983	(South Africa) Kevin Curren (United States) Steve Denton	(Switzerland) Heinz Günthardt (Hungary) Balázs Taróczy	7–5, 2–6, 6–1

== See also ==
- Bavarian International Tennis Championships
