= 1975 Denver WCT =

- Date: April 14–20
- Edition: 4th
- Category: World Championship Tennis (WCT)
- Draw: 32S / 16D
- Prize money: $60,000
- Surface: Carpet / indoor
- Location: Denver, Colorado, U.S.

Champions

Singles
- (United States) Jimmy Connors

Doubles
- (Australia) Roy Emerson / (Australia) Rod Laver
- Denver WCT

The 1975 Denver WCT, also known as the 1975 United Bank Tennis Classic for sponsorship reasons, was a men's professional tennis tournament. It was held on indoor carpet courts in Denver, Colorado. It was the fourth edition of the tournament and was held from 14 April through 20 April 1975. The tournament was part of the 1975 World Championship Tennis circuit, and was part of the Blue group circuit. Unseeded Jimmy Connors, who qualified for the main draw to make his WCT debut, won the singles title and the accompanying $12,000 first prize.

== Finals ==
=== Singles ===
(United States) Jimmy Connors defeated (United States) Brian Gottfried 6–3, 6–4

- It was Connor's 6th singles title of the year and the 38th of his career.

=== Doubles ===
(Australia) Roy Emerson / (Australia) Rod Laver defeated (Australia) Bob Carmichael / (Australia) Allan Stone 6–2, 3–6, 7–5

== See also ==
- 1975 Majestic International
