= 1975 ABN World Tennis Tournament =

- Date: 24 February – 2 March
- Edition: 3rd
- Category: World Championship Tennis
- Draw: 32S / 16D
- Prize money: $60,000
- Surface: Carpet / indoor
- Location: Rotterdam, Netherlands
- Venue: Rotterdam Ahoy
- Attendance: 47,772

Champions

Singles
- (United States) Arthur Ashe

Doubles
- (South Africa) Bob Hewitt / (South Africa) Frew McMillan
- ABN World Tennis Tournament

The 1975 ABN World Tennis Tournament was a men's tennis tournament played on indoor carpet courts at Rotterdam Ahoy in the Netherlands. It was part of the 1975 World Championship Tennis circuit. The tournament was held from 24 February through 2 March 1975. First-seeded Arthur Ashe won the singles title, his second after 1972.

== Finals ==
=== Singles ===
(United States) Arthur Ashe defeated (Netherlands) Tom Okker 3–6, 6–2, 6–4

=== Doubles ===
(South Africa) Bob Hewitt / (South Africa) Frew McMillan defeated (Spain) José Higueras / (Hungary) Balázs Taróczy 6–2, 6–2
