= 1975 World Championship Tennis Finals – Singles =

Singles
- 1975 World Championship Tennis Finals

Final
- Champion: (United States) Arthur Ashe
- Runner-up: (Sweden) Björn Borg
- Score: 3–6, 6–4, 6–4, 6–0

Events
Singles
← 1974 ·	World Championship Tennis Finals	· 1976 →

John Newcombe was the defending champion but did not compete that year.

Arthur Ashe won in the final 3–6, 6–4, 6–4, 6–0 against Björn Borg.

== Seeds ==
A champion seed is indicated in bold text while text in italics indicates the round in which that seed was eliminated.

1. (United States) **Arthur Ashe (champion)**
2. (United States) Harold Solomon (quarterfinals)
3. (Sweden) Björn Borg (final)
4. (United States) Roscoe Tanner (quarterfinals)
5. (Australia) John Alexander (semifinals)
6. (Mexico) Raúl Ramirez (quarterfinals)
7. (Australia) Rod Laver (semifinals)
8. (United Kingdom) Mark Cox (quarterfinals)

== Draw ==
=== Key ===
- Q = Qualifier
- WC = Wild card
- LL = Lucky loser
- Alt = Alternate
- SE = Special exempt
- PR = Protected ranking
- ITF = ITF entry
- JE = Junior exempt
- w/o = Walkover
- r = Retired
- d = Defaulted
- SR = Special ranking

Quarterfinals
1	(United States) **Arthur Ashe**	1	**6**	**6**	**7^{7}**
8	(United Kingdom) Mark Cox	**6**	4	4	6^{4}
4	(United States) Roscoe Tanner	3	2	3
5	(Australia) **John Alexander**	**6**	**6**	**6**
6	(Mexico) Raúl Ramirez	6^{5}	6^{5}	0
3	(Sweden) **Björn Borg**	**7^{7}**	**7^{7}**	**6**
7	(Australia) **Rod Laver**	4	**6**	**6**	3	**6**
2	(United States) Harold Solomon	**6**	0	2	**6**	3

Semifinals
1	(United States) **Arthur Ashe**	3	**6**	**6**	**6**
5	(Australia) John Alexander	**6**	1	3	4
3	(Sweden) **Björn Borg**	**7^{7}**	3	5	**7^{7}**	**6**
7	(Australia) Rod Laver	6^{2}	**6**	**7**	6^{2}	2

Final
1	(United States) **Arthur Ashe**	3	**6**	**6**	**6**
3	(Sweden) Björn Borg	**6**	4	4	0
