= 1976 Charlotte Tennis Classic =

- Date: April 13–18
- Edition: 6th
- Category: World Championship Tennis
- Draw: 16S / 8D
- Prize money: $60,000
- Surface: Clay / outdoor
- Location: Charlotte, North Carolina, U.S.
- Venue: Olde Providence Racquet Club

Champions

Singles
- (Australia) Tony Roche

Doubles
- (Australia) Tony Roche / (Australia) John Newcombe
- Carolinas International Tennis Tournament

The 1976 Charlotte Tennis Classic, also known by its sponsored name North Carolina National Bank Tennis Classic, was a men's tennis tournament played on outdoor clay courts that was part of the World Championship Tennis (WCT) circuit. It was the sixth edition of the tournament and was held from April 13 through April 18, 1976 at the Julian J. Clark Tennis Stadium, owned by the Olde Providence Racquet Club in Charlotte, North Carolina in the United States. Tony Roche won the singles title.

== Finals ==
=== Singles ===
(Australia) Tony Roche defeated (United States) Vitas Gerulaitis 6–3, 3–6, 6–1

- It was Roche's 1st singles title of the year and the 8th of his career in the open era.

=== Doubles ===
(Australia) Tony Roche / (Australia) John Newcombe defeated (United States) Vitas Gerulaitis / (United States) Gene Mayer 6–3, 7–5
