= 1974 Munich WCT =

Tennis tournament

- Date: 1–7 April
- Edition: 2nd
- Category: World Championship Tennis (WCT)
- Draw: 32S / 16D
- Prize money: $50,000
- Surface: Carpet / indoor
- Location: Munich, West Germany

Champions

Singles
- (South Africa) Frew McMillan

Doubles
- (South Africa) Bob Hewitt / (South Africa) Frew McMillan
- Munich WCT

The 1974 Munich WCT was a men's tennis tournament played on indoor carpet courts in Munich, West Germany. The tournament was part of Red Group of the 1974 World Championship Tennis circuit. It was the second edition of the event and was held from 1 April through 7 April 1974. Frew McMillan won the singles title.

== Finals ==
=== Singles ===
(South Africa) Frew McMillan defeated (Socialist Federal Republic of Yugoslavia) Niki Pilić 5–7, 7–6^{(7–4)}, 7–6^{(7–4)}

=== Doubles ===
(South Africa) Bob Hewitt / (South Africa) Frew McMillan defeated (France) Pierre Barthès / (Romania) Ilie Năstase 6–2, 7–6
