= La Costa WCT =

Men's tennis tournament in La Costa, California, from 1973 to 1977

Defunct tennis tournament
- Tour: WCT Tour (1973–1975); IPA (1976); Grand Prix circuit (1977)
- Founded: 1973
- Abolished: 1977
- Editions: 5
- Location: La Costa, CA, US
- Venue: La Costa Country Club
- Surface: Hard / outdoor

The La Costa WCT was a men's professional tennis tournament played on outdoor hard courts at the La Costa Country Club in La Costa, California, United States from 1973 to 1977. The event was initially part of the WCT Tour until 1976 when it became an International Players Association (IPA) event. The final edition in 1977 was part of the Grand Prix circuit.

== Finals ==
=== Singles ===
Year	Champions	Runners-up	Score
1973	(Australia) Colin Dibley	(United States) Stan Smith	6–3, 7–6
1974	(Australia) John Newcombe	(United States) Stan Smith	6–2, 4–6, 6–4
1975	(Australia) Rod Laver	(Australia) Allan Stone	6–2, 6–2
1976	(Romania) Ilie Năstase	(United States) Jimmy Connors	4–6, 6–0, 6–1
1977	(United States) Brian Gottfried	(United States) Marty Riessen	6–3, 6–2

=== Doubles ===
Year	Champions	Runners-up	Score
1973	(Australia) Roy Emerson (Australia) Rod Laver	(Socialist Federal Republic of Yugoslavia) Nikola Pilić (Australia) Allan Stone	6–7, 6–3, 6–4
1974	(United States) Clark Graebner (United States) Charlie Pasarell	(Australia) Roy Emerson (United States) Dennis Ralston	6–4, 6–7, 7–5
1975	(United States) Brian Gottfried (Mexico) Raúl Ramírez	(United States) Charlie Pasarell (United States) Roscoe Tanner	7–5, 6–4
1976	(United States) Marty Riessen (United States) Roscoe Tanner	(United States) Peter Fleming (United States) Gene Mayer	7–6, 7–6
1977	(South Africa) Bob Hewitt (South Africa) Frew McMillan	(Australia) Ray Ruffels (Australia) Allan Stone	6–4, 6–2

== Event names ==
- La Costa Invitational (1969–70)
- Michelob Pro–Celebrity Classic (1973–1975)
- La Costa Pro-Celebrity Tennis Classic (1976)
- La Costa International Tennis Classic (1977)
- WCT California Classic (1982)
