= Barcelona WCT =

Defunct tennis tournament
- Tour: WCT tour
- Founded: 1974
- Abolished: 1976
- Editions: 3
- Location: Barcelona, Spain
- Surface: Carpet / indoors

The Barcelona WCT was a men's tennis tournament played in Barcelona, Spain from 1974 through 1976. The event was part of the World Championship Tennis (WCT) circuit and was played on indoor carpet courts.

== Men's singles ==
Year	Champions	Runners-up	Score
1974	(United States) Arthur Ashe	(Sweden) Björn Borg	6–4, 3–6, 6–3
1975	(United States) Arthur Ashe	(Sweden) Björn Borg	6–4, 7–6
1976	(United States) Eddie Dibbs	(South Africa) Cliff Drysdale	6–1, 6–1

=== Doubles ===
Year	Champions	Runners-up	Score
1974	(United States) Arthur Ashe (United States) Roscoe Tanner	(United States) Tom Edlefsen (United States) Tom Leonard	6–3, 6–4
1975	(United States) Arthur Ashe (Netherlands) Tom Okker	(Italy) Paolo Bertolucci (Italy) Adriano Panatta	7–5, 6–1
1976	(United States) Bob Lutz (United States) Stan Smith	(Poland) Wojciech Fibak (West Germany) Karl Meiler	6–3, 6–3
