= Mark Cox (tennis) =

English tennis player (born 1943)

- Country (sports): United Kingdom
- Born: 5 July 1943 (age 83) Leicester, England
- Height: 6 ft 1 in (1.85 m)
- Turned pro: 1970 (amateur from 1958)
- Retired: 1981
- Plays: Left-handed (one-handed backhand)

Singles
- Career record: 593–370 (61.5%) in pre Open-Era & Open Era
- Career titles: 24
- Highest ranking: No. 12 (3 October 1977)

Grand Slam singles results
- Australian Open: QF (1967, 1971)
- French Open: 3R (1968)
- Wimbledon: 4R (1968, 1977, 1979)
- US Open: QF (1966)

Other tournaments
- WCT Finals: QF (1975)

Doubles
- Career record: 142–157 (Open era)
- Career titles: 3 (Open era)

Team competitions
- Davis Cup: F (1978)

Mark Cox (born 5 July 1943) is a former tennis player from England, who played professional and amateur tennis in the 1960s, 1970s and 1980s. He was ranked as high as world No. 12 on the ATP rankings, achieving that ranking in October 1977.

== Early life and education ==
Cox was educated at Wyggeston Grammar School in Leicester and Millfield School in Somerset. He obtained an economics undergraduate degree from Downing College, Cambridge, where he was a member of the Cambridge University Lawn Tennis Club. Upon graduating from Cambridge, Cox was employed by a stockbroking firm and only turned professional in 1970. As he later admitted to sports writer James Buddell, "[I] never really thought of tennis as a career. There was no view of open tennis, so when I initially left university, playing felt like a gap year — great fun, and the expenses helped keep my head above water."

== Career ==
Cox played his first tournament on 3 November 1958 at the Torquay Indoor Championship. During his career, he won twenty-four singles titles and three doubles titles spanning both the pre-Open Era and Open Era, and reached the quarterfinals of the U.S. National Championships (in 1966) and the Australian Open (in 1971). He also played for Great Britain's Davis Cup team, and was on the team that reached the 1978 final against the United States. He won 23 of his Davis Cup matches and lost 12.

Following the establishment of the Open Era in men's tennis in 1968, Cox went down in history as the first amateur player to beat a professional when he defeated the American Pancho Gonzales in the second round of the British Hard Court Championships at Bournemouth, in a match that went to five sets and lasted two and a quarter hours. He followed this up for good measure by beating two times Wimbledon Champion Roy Emerson in the next round. It was after his victory over Emerson that Time magazine referred to Cox as a "giant killer", a reputation he strengthened further by achieving big upset wins over No. 1 seed Rod Laver at the 1971 Australian Open and over No. 2 seed Ken Rosewall at the 1972 US Open. During his career, Cox maintained positive head-to-head records over several top players, such as Guillermo Vilas (whom Cox defeated 6–1, 6–1 at the Memphis Open in 1977, a year when Vilas lost only 14 out of 154 matches), Manuel Orantes, Lew Hoad, Roscoe Tanner, Jan Kodes and Ivan Lendl.

Some of Cox's finest moments came late in his career; a notable triumph was at the 1976 Stockholm Open, when at the age of 33 he won the title after knocking out world No. 1 Jimmy Connors and Manuel Orantes (respectively the reigning and previous US Open champions) in succession. He remarked afterwards that "At the big points I played the right shots, the first services were going in. It was like a fairy story." Although able to win on all surfaces he was especially adept at playing on indoor carpet courts, and in 1975 he became the last British player to win back-to-back professional titles (at the Washington Indoor WCT and London WCT events) until Andy Murray repeated the feat in 2008. These two tournament wins allowed him to qualify (as one of the top eight players on the World Championship Tennis circuit) for that year's WCT Finals, where he lost to the eventual champion, Arthur Ashe.

Cox retired from playing in 1981, losing to Yannick Noah in his last ever competitive match at the Paris Indoor Open. To date, he is the last English-born male to win a top level UK tournament on grass (Eastbourne in 1973). After his final title in 1977 it would take another 17 years for a British player to win a top-level tour title (Jeremy Bates at Seoul in 1994). During his latter playing years and after his retirement, he worked as a coach and also as a television commentator for the BBC.

== Personal life ==
Cox is a Patron of a charity "CRY" (Cardiac Risk in the Young) and an ambassador for the Win Tennis Academy at Bisham. He lives in London in the house he shared with his late wife Susie.

== Career finals ==
=== Singles: 42 (24 titles / 18 runner-ups) ===
Finals by surface
Hard (7–5)
Grass (4–4)
Clay (3–6)
Carpet (10–3)

Result	No.	Date	Tournament	Surface	Opponent	Score
Loss	1.	1962	Budleigh Salterton, England	Grass	(United Kingdom) Jaroslav Drobny	4–6, 6–0, 2–6
Loss	2.	1962	Eastbourne, England	Grass	(United Kingdom) Roger Becker	6–4, 2–6, 4–6
Loss	3.	1963	Manly, Australia	Grass	(Australia) Martin Mulligan	2–6, 2–6
Win	1.	1963	Eastbourne, England	Grass	(Australia) Warren Jacques	1–6, 7–5, 6–2
Loss	4.	1965	Chingford, England	Clay	(United Kingdom) Bobby Wilson	2–6, 6–8
Win	2.	1966	Baltimore, U.S.	Grass	(United States) Jim McManus	6–3, 6–2, 6–3
Win	3.	1967	Hutt Valley, Australia	Hard	(New Zealand) Brian Fairlie	6–2, 6–4
Loss	5.	1967	East London, South Africa	Clay	(Netherlands) Tom Okker	7–9, 5–7
Win	4.	1968	San Juan, Puerto Rico	Hard	(United States) Allen Fox	6–2, 6–1, 4–6, 2–6, 6–2
Open era
Loss	6.	1968	London, England	Carpet (i)	(United States) Stan Smith	4–6, 4–6
Win	5.	1968	Eastbourne, England	Grass	(Australia) Owen Davidson	6–4, 6–4
Win	6.	1968	Istanbul, Turkey	Clay	(Chile) Patricio Rodríguez	6–3, 6–3, 2–6, 6–4
Win	7.	1968	Perth, Scotland	Carpet (i)	(South Africa) Bob Hewitt	6–3, 6–4
Win	8.	1969	Bloemfontein, South Africa	Hard	(South Africa) Bob Maud	6–2, 7–5
Loss	7.	1968	Buffalo, New York, U.S.	Hard (i)	(United States) Clark Graebner	8–6, 9–7, 6–2
Loss	8.	1969	Macon, U.S.	Carpet (i)	(Spain) Manuel Orantes	8–10, 5–7, 6–4, 7–9
Loss	9.	1969	Caracas, Venezuela	Clay	(Brazil) Thomaz Koch	6–8, 3–6, 6–2, 4–6
Loss	10.	1969	Willemstad, Curaçao	Clay	(United States) Cliff Richey	4–6, 3–6, 3–6
Win	9.	1969	Charlotte, U.S.	Clay	(Czechoslovakia) Jan Kodeš	13–11, 6–2
Win	10.	1969	Stalybridge, England	Carpet (i)	(South Africa) Bob Hewitt	6–4, 6–3
Win	11.	1969	Torquay, England	Hard (i)	(United Kingdom) John Clifton	8–6, 6–3
Win	12.	1969	London, England	Carpet (i)	(South Africa) Bob Hewitt	4–6, 9–7, 6–2
Win	13.	1969	Perth, Scotland	Carpet (i)	(Egypt) Ismail El Shafei	3–6, 14–12, 6–1
Win	14.	1970	Bournemouth, England	Clay	(South Africa) Bob Hewitt	6–1, 6–2, 6–3
Loss	11.	1971	Midland, U.S.	Hard	(Socialist Federal Republic of Yugoslavia) Nikola Pilić	6–7, 6–7, 3–6
Win	15.	1972	Macon WCT, U.S.	Carpet (i)	(Australia) Roy Emerson	6–3, 6–7, 6–3
Loss	12.	1972	Louisville WCT, U.S.	Clay	(United States) Arthur Ashe	4–6, 4–6
Win	16.	1972	Cleveland WCT, U.S.	Hard	(Australia) Ray Ruffels	6–3, 4–6, 4–6, 6–3, 6–4
Loss	13.	1973	London WCT, England	Hard (i)	(New Zealand) Brian Fairlie	6–2, 2–6, 2–6, 6–7
Win	17.	1973	Denver WCT, U.S.	Carpet (i)	(United States) Arthur Ashe	6–1, 6–1
Win	18.	1973	Eastbourne, England	Grass	(France) Patrice Dominguez	6–2, 2–6, 6–3
Win	19.	1973	Dublin, Ireland	Hard	(South Africa) John Yuill	7–5, 3–6, 11–9
Loss	14.	1974	Bologna WCT, Italy	Carpet (i)	(United States) Arthur Ashe	4–6, 5–7
Loss	15.	1974	London WCT, England	Hard (i)	(Sweden) Björn Borg	7–6, 6–7, 4–6
Win	20.	1975	Washington Indoor WCT, U.S.	Carpet (i)	(United States) Dick Stockton	6–2, 7–6
Win	21.	1975	London WCT, England	Carpet (i)	(New Zealand) Brian Fairlie	6–1, 7–5
Win	22.	1975	Atlanta WCT, U.S.	Carpet (i)	(Australia) John Alexander	6–3, 7–6
Win	23.	1976	Stockholm, Sweden	Hard (i)	(Spain) Manuel Orantes	4–6, 7–5, 7–6
Win	24.	1977	Helsinki, Finland	Carpet (i)	(Sweden) Kjell Johansson	6–3, 6–3
Loss	16.	1977	Queen's Club, England	Grass	(Mexico) Raúl Ramírez	7–9, 5–7
Loss	17.	1977	Cincinnati, U.S.	Clay	(United States) Harold Solomon	2–6, 3–6
Loss	18.	1980	Stuttgart Indoor, West Germany	Hard (i)	(Czechoslovakia) Tomáš Šmíd	1–6, 3–6, 7–5, 6–1, 4–6

=== Doubles: 11 (3 titles / 8 runner-ups) ===
Result	W-L	Date	Tournament	Surface	Partner	Opponents	Score
Loss	0–1	Feb 1973	Copenhagen, Denmark	Carpet (i)	(United Kingdom) Graham Stilwell	(United States) Erik van Dillen (United States) Tom Gorman	4–6, 4–6
Win	1–1	Feb 1973	Cologne, West Germany	Carpet (i)	(United Kingdom) Graham Stilwell	(Netherlands) Tom Okker (United States) Marty Riessen	7–6, 6–3
Win	2–1	Nov 1973	London, England	Carpet (i)	(Australia) Owen Davidson	(United Kingdom) Gerald Battrick (United Kingdom) Graham Stilwell	6–4, 8–6
Loss	2–2	Apr 1974	Denver WCT, U.S.	Carpet (i)	(Japan) Jun Kamiwazumi	(United States) Arthur Ashe (United States) Roscoe Tanner	3–6, 6–7
Loss	2–3	Feb 1975	San Antonio WCT, U.S.	Hard	(South Africa) Cliff Drysdale	(Australia) John Alexander (Australia) Phil Dent	6–7, 6–4, 4–6
Loss	2–4	Mar 1975	Memphis, U.S.	Carpet (i)	(South Africa) Cliff Drysdale	(United States) Erik van Dillen (United States) Dick Stockton	6–1, 5–7, 4–6
Loss	2–5	Mar 1975	Atlanta WCT, U.S.	Carpet (i)	(South Africa) Cliff Drysdale	(India) Anand Amritraj (India) Vijay Amritraj	3–6, 2–6
Loss	2–6	May 1975	World Doubles WCT, Mexico	Carpet (i)	(South Africa) Cliff Drysdale	(United States) Brian Gottfried (Mexico) Raúl Ramírez	6–7^{(6–8)}, 7–6^{(7–5)}, 2–6, 6–7^{(6–8)}
Loss	2–7	Mar 1976	Washington WCT, U.S.	Carpet	(South Africa) Cliff Drysdale	(United States) Eddie Dibbs (United States) Harold Solomon	4–6, 5–7
Loss	2–8	Apr 1977	London WCT, England	Hard (i)	(United States) Eddie Dibbs	(Romania) Ilie Năstase (Italy) Adriano Panatta	6–7, 7–6, 3–6
Win	3–8	Oct 1977	Basel, Switzerland	Carpet (i)	(United Kingdom) Buster Mottram	(United Kingdom) John Feaver (Australia) John James	7–5, 6–4, 6–3
