= Arthur Ashe =

American tennis player (1943–1993)

- Arthur Ashe in Southern California 1966
- Country (sports): United States
- Born: July 10, 1943 Richmond, Virginia, US
- Died: February 6, 1993 (aged 49) New York City, US
- Height: 6 ft 1 in (1.85 m)
- Turned pro: 1969 (amateur tour from 1959)
- Retired: April 1980
- Plays: Right-handed (one-handed backhand)
- Prize money: $1,584,909 (ATP)
- Int. Tennis HoF: 1985 (member page)

Singles
- Career record: 1188–371 in pre Open-Era & Open Era
- Career titles: 87 (45 Open Era titles listed by ATP)
- Highest ranking: No. 1 (1968)

Grand Slam singles results
- Australian Open: W (1970)
- French Open: QF (1970, 1971)
- Wimbledon: W (1975)
- US Open: W (1968)

Other tournaments
- Tour Finals: F (1978)
- WCT Finals: W (1975)

Doubles
- Career record: 323–176 (Note: In Grand Prix, WCT, Grand Slam-main draws, and Davis Cup.)
- Career titles: 18 (14 Grand Prix and WCT titles)
- Highest ranking: No. 15 (August 30, 1977)

Grand Slam doubles results
- Australian Open: W (1977)
- French Open: W (1971)
- Wimbledon: F (1971)
- US Open: F (1968)

Team competitions
- Davis Cup: W (1963, 1968, 1969, 1970)

Arthur Robert Ashe Jr. (July 10, 1943 – February 6, 1993) was an American professional tennis player. He won three Grand Slam singles titles in singles and two in doubles. Ashe was the first Black player selected to the United States Davis Cup team, and the only Black man ever to win the singles titles at Wimbledon, the US Open, and the Australian Open. He remained an amateur player before the advent of the Open Era in tennis. Ashe was a serve-and-volley player with a powerful serve. In 1975 he won the season-ending WCT Finals. He suffered a heart attack in July 1979 and retired in 1980.

Ashe was ranked world No. 1 by Rex Bellamy, Bud Collins, Judith Elian, Lance Tingay, World Tennis and Tennis Magazine (U.S.) in 1975. That year, Ashe was awarded the 'Martini and Rossi' Award, voted for by a panel of journalists, and the ATP Player of the Year award. In the ATP computer rankings, he peaked at world No. 2 in May 1976.

Ashe is believed to have acquired HIV from a blood transfusion he received during heart bypass surgery in 1983. He publicly announced his illness in April 1992, and began working to educate others about HIV and AIDS. He founded the Arthur Ashe Foundation for the Defeat of AIDS and the Arthur Ashe Institute for Urban Health before his death from AIDS-related pneumonia at the age of 49 on February 6, 1993. On June 20, 1993, he was posthumously awarded the Presidential Medal of Freedom by United States president Bill Clinton. The Arthur Ashe Stadium, the main court for the US Open and the largest tennis arena in the world, is named in his honor.

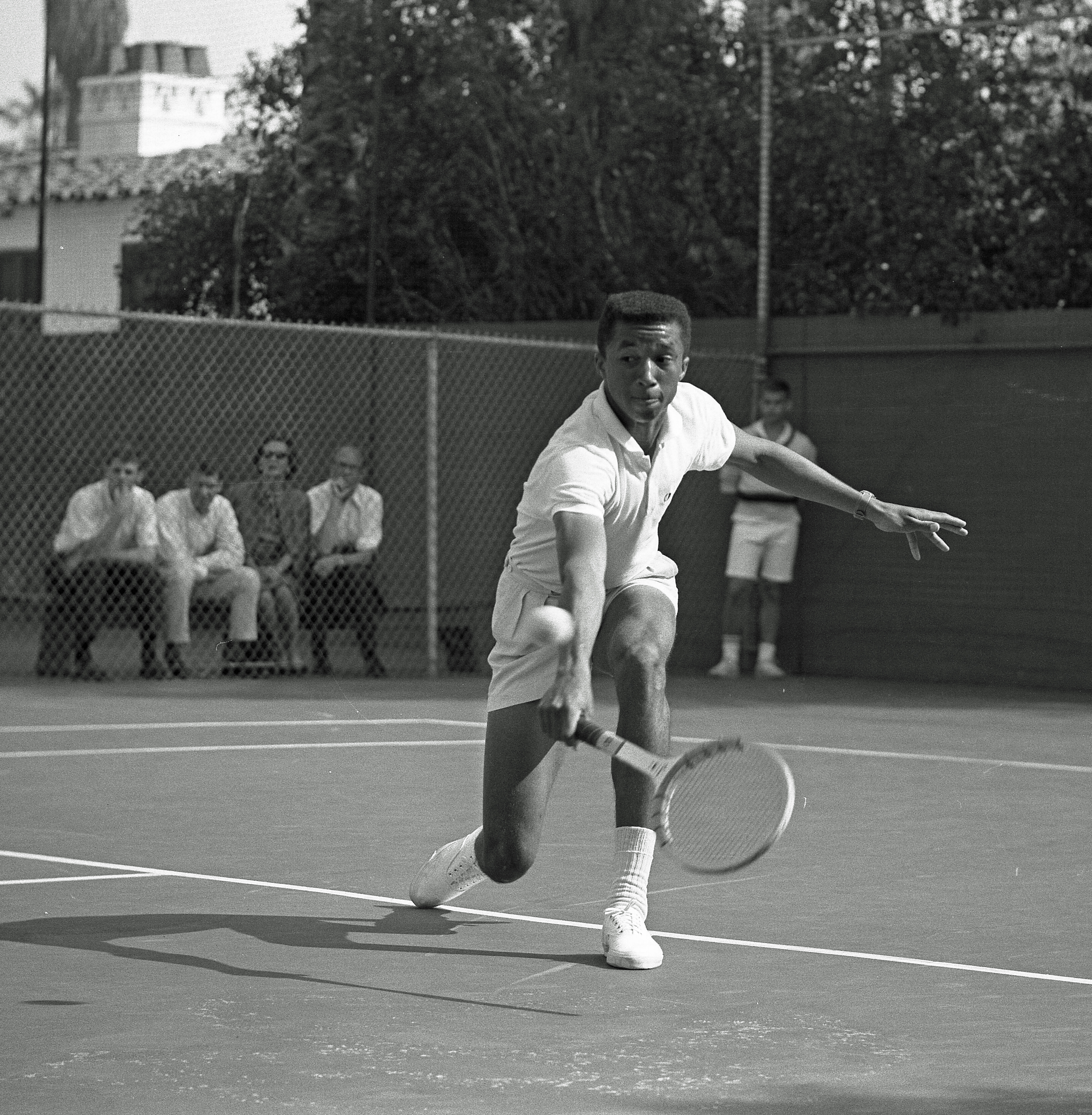
Ashe playing against Dennis Ralston at the 1964 Southern California Intercollegiates.

== Early life, education, and early tennis experience ==
Arthur Ashe was born in Richmond, Virginia, to Arthur Ashe Sr. (died 1989) and Mattie Cordell Cunningham Ashe on July 10, 1943. He had a brother Johnnie, who was five years younger. The brothers were born into the Blackwell Family of Virginia, a family that claimed direct descent from Amar, a West African woman who was enslaved and brought to America in 1735 aboard a ship called The Doddington. Ashe family members were enslaved by North Carolina Governor Samuel Ashe.

In March 1950, Ashe's mother, Mattie, died from complications related to a toxemic pregnancy (now known as pre-eclampsia) at the age of 27, when Ashe was 6. Ashe and his brother were raised by their father, who worked as a handyman and salaried caretaker/Special Policeman for Richmond's recreation department.

Ashe Sr. was a caring father and strict disciplinarian who encouraged Ashe to excel both in school and in sports, but forbade him to play American football, a popular game for many boys, due to his son's slight build: supposedly Ashe's childhood nicknames were "Skinny" and "Bones". The Ashes lived in the caretaker's cottage in the grounds of 18-acre Brookfield park, Richmond's largest blacks-only public playground, which had basketball courts, four tennis courts, a pool, and three baseball diamonds. Ashe started playing tennis at seven years of age and began practicing on the courts where his natural talent was spotted by Virginia Union University student and part-time Brookfield tennis instructor Ron Charity. Charity, as the best black tennis player in Richmond at the time, began to teach Ashe the basic strokes and encouraged him to enter local tournaments.

Ashe attended Maggie L. Walker High School in Richmond, Virginia, where he continued to practice tennis. Ron Charity brought him to the attention of Robert Walter Johnson, a physician, and the coach of Althea Gibson, who founded and funded the Junior Development Program of the American Tennis Association (ATA). Ashe was coached and mentored by Johnson at his tennis summer-camp home in Lynchburg, Virginia, from 1953 when Ashe was aged 10, until 1960. Johnson helped fine-tune Ashe's game and taught him the importance of racial socialization through sportsmanship, etiquette, and the composure that would later become an Ashe hallmark. He was told to return every ball that landed within two inches of a line and never to argue with an umpire's decision. In 1958, Ashe became the first African-American to play in the Maryland boys' championships. It was also his first integrated tennis competition.

In 1960, Ashe was precluded from competing against white youths in segregated Richmond during the school year, and unable to use the city's indoor courts that were closed to Black players. He accepted an offer from Richard Hudlin, a 62-year-old St. Louis teacher, tennis coach, and friend of Johnson, to move to St. Louis and spend his senior year attending Sumner High School, where he could compete more freely. Ashe lived with Hudlin and his family in the Bennett district near Hadley Township for the year, during which time Hudlin coached and encouraged him to develop the serve-and-volley game that Ashe's now-stronger physique allowed. Ashe was able to practice at the National Guard Armory indoor courts and in 1961, after lobbying by Johnson, was granted permission to compete in the previously segregated U.S. Interscholastic tournament and won it for the school.

In December 1960 and again in 1963, Ashe was featured in Sports Illustrated, appearing in their Faces in the Crowd segment. He became the first African-American to win the National Junior Indoor tennis title.

== Higher education and military service ==
Ashe was awarded a tennis scholarship to the University of California, Los Angeles (UCLA) in 1963. During his time at UCLA, he was coached by J. D. Morgan and practiced regularly with his sporting idol, Pancho Gonzales, who lived nearby and helped hone his game. Ashe was also a member of the ROTC, which required him to enter active military service after graduation in exchange for money for tuition. He was active in other organizations, later pledging the Upsilon chapter of Kappa Alpha Psi fraternity and becoming a member/brother of the fraternity.

After graduating with a bachelor's degree in Business Administration, Ashe joined the United States Army on August 4, 1966. Ashe was the first person on his father's side of the family to graduate from college. He completed his basic training in Washington and was later commissioned as a second lieutenant in the Adjutant General Corps. He was assigned to the United States Military Academy at West Point where he worked as a data processor. During his time at West Point, Ashe headed the academy's tennis program. He was promoted to 1st Lieutenant on February 23, 1968, and was honorably discharged from the Army on February 22, 1969, as a 1st Lieutenant. As a member of the U.S. Armed Forces who served honorably during that period, he was awarded the National Defense Service Medal.

== Tennis career ==
=== 1960s ===
In 1961, Ashe won the Eastern Clay Court Championships defeating George Ball and Bob Barker in close five set matches in the semifinal and final.

In 1963, Ashe won the Pacific Southwest Championships in Los Angeles on concrete defeating Rafael Osuna and Whitney Reed in the final two rounds. The following season he won the 1964 Eastern Grass Court Championships at South Orange, New Jersey defeating Dennis Ralston, Gene Scott, and Clark Graebner in close matches.

In 1963, Ashe became the first black player ever selected for the United States Davis Cup team. In 1965, ranked the number 3 player in the United States, Ashe won both the National Collegiate Athletic Association (NCAA) singles title and the doubles title (with Ian Crookenden of New Zealand), helping UCLA win the NCAA team tennis championship.

In 1966 and 1967, Ashe reached the final of the Australian Championship but lost on both occasions to Roy Emerson. He won the 1967 U.S. Men's Clay Court Championships in Milwaukee defeating Marty Riessen in the final.

In 1968, Ashe won the United States Amateur Championships against Davis Cup teammate Bob Lutz. He served 26 aces in the US Open final to beat Tom Okker in five sets. "I couldn't handle his serve" admitted Okker afterwards. He became the first US Open champion of the Open Era, becoming the first black male to capture the title and the only player to have won both the amateur and open national championships in the same year. In order to maintain Davis Cup eligibility and have time away from army duty for important tournaments, Ashe was required to maintain his amateur status. Because of this, he could not accept the $14,000 first-prize money, which was instead given to runner-up Okker, while Ashe received just $20 daily expenses for his historic triumph. His ability to compete in the championship (and avoid the Vietnam War) arose from his brother Johnnie's decision to serve an additional tour in Vietnam in Arthur's place.

In December 1968, Ashe helped the U.S. team become Davis Cup champions after victory in the final in Adelaide against defending champions, Australia. His only loss in the 12 Davis Cup tournament singles matches he played that year, was in the last dead rubber game after the U.S. team had already clinched victory. The season closed with Ashe the winner of 10 of 22 tournaments with a 72–10 win-loss match record.

In September 1969, the U.S. Davis Cup team retained the cup, beating Romania in the final challenge round, with Ashe winning both his singles matches. The same year, Ashe applied for a visa to play in the South African Open but was denied the visa by the South African government who enforced a strict apartheid policy of racial segregation.

He continued to apply for visas in the following years and the country continued to deny him one. In protest, he used this example of discrimination to campaign for U.S. sanctions against South Africa and the expulsion of the nation from the International Lawn Tennis Federation (ILTF) but, in defense of the individual South African players, refused the call from activists to forfeit matches against them.

=== 1970s ===
In January 1970, Ashe won his second Grand Slam singles title at the Australian Open. With the competition somewhat depleted by the absence of some world-class National Tennis League (NTL) professional players barred by their league from entering because the financial guarantees were deemed too low, Ashe defeated Dick Crealy in straight sets in the final (which was played in a light drizzle which caused Ashe's glasses to mist up) to become the first non-Australian to win the title since 1959.

In March 1970, triggered by South Africa's refusal to grant Ashe a visa to play there, the country was expelled from the Davis Cup competition for its racial policy. In September 1970, Ashe helped the U.S. Davis cup team defeat West Germany in the challenge round to win their third consecutive Davis Cup. Ashe then turned professional, signing a five-year contract with Lamar Hunt's World Championship Tennis.

In March 1971, Ashe reached the final of the Australian Open again but lost in straight sets to Ken Rosewall. In June that year, Ashe won the French Open men's doubles with partner Marty Riessen.

In 1972, due to a dispute between the ILTF and the WCT, Ashe, as one of the 32 contracted WCT players, was barred from taking part in any ILTF Grand Prix tennis circuit tournaments from January to July. This ban meant Ashe was unable to play at the French Open and Wimbledon Grand Slam tournaments.

In September, Ashe reached the final of the US Open for the second time. After leading Ilie Năstase 2 sets to 1 and 4–2 in the fourth set, he eventually lost in five sets. The loss from such a winning position was the biggest disappointment of Ashe's professional tennis career. At the post-match award ceremony, irritated by some of Năstase's on-court antics during the game, Ashe praised Năstase as a tough opponent and 'colourful' player, then suggested, "... and when he brushes up on some of his court manners, he is going to be even better".

At this tournament, concerned that men's tennis professionals were not receiving winnings commensurate with the sport's growing popularity and to protect players from promoters and associations, Ashe supported the founding of the Association of Tennis Professionals. He went on to become its elected president in 1974.

In June 1973, as a result of an ATP boycott, Ashe was one of 13 seeded players and 81 players in total who withdrew from the Wimbledon tournament to much public criticism. The catalyst for the boycott was that Yugoslavian ATP member Niki Pilić had been suspended for nine months by his tennis federation after allegedly refusing to represent them in a Davis Cup tie against New Zealand in May, something Pilić denied.

The ban was upheld by the ILTF though they reduced it to just one month. The ATP contested the ban but lost a lawsuit to force Pilić's participation at Wimbledon during the ban period. As a member of the ATP board, Ashe voted to boycott the tournament, a vote that was only narrowly passed when ATP chairman, Cliff Drysdale abstained. Commentators considered that the boycott demonstrated the power of the fledgling ATP, and showed the tennis associations that professional players could no longer be dictated to.

In November 1973, with the South African government seeking to end their Olympic ban and re-join the Olympic movement, Ashe was finally granted a visa to enter the country for the first time, to play in the South African Open. He lost in the final to Jimmy Connors, but won the doubles with partner Tom Okker.

Despite boycotts against South African sport, Ashe believed that his presence could help break down stereotypes and that by competing and winning the tournament, it would stand as an example of the result of integration, and help bring about change in apartheid South Africa. He reached the singles final again in 1974, losing in straight sets to Connors for the second consecutive year.

In 1977, Ashe addressed a small crowd of boycott supporters at the U.S. Open and admitted that he had been wrong to participate in South Africa and once again supported the boycott of South African players after he had tried to purchase tickets for some young Africans for a tennis match in South Africa, and was told to use an "Africans only" counter. In the media, Ashe called for South Africa to be expelled from the professional tennis circuit and Davis Cup competition.

In May 1975, Ashe beat Björn Borg to win the season-ending championship WCT Finals in Dallas. On July 5, 1975, in the first all-American Wimbledon final since 1947, Ashe, seeded sixth and just a few days short of his 32nd birthday, won Wimbledon at his ninth attempt, defeating the overwhelming favorite and defending champion, Jimmy Connors.

Ashe had never beaten Connors in any of their previous encounters and Connors had not dropped a set in any of the six earlier rounds, but Ashe played an almost perfect game of tactical tennis to win in four sets. In the lead-up to the final, the two players' relationship was already strained. Connors was suing the ATP, with Ashe as its president, for $10 million for alleged restraint of trade after opposition from the ATP and French officials meant he was refused entry to the 1974 French Open as a contracted member of World Team Tennis (WTT).

Just two days before the start of the Wimbledon tournament, it had been announced that Connors was now suing Ashe for $5 million for comments in a letter Ashe had written to ATP members in his role as president, criticizing Connors' insistence that Davis Cup captain Dennis Ralston should be fired and Connors' "unpatriotic" boycott of the competition which had started after Ralston left him out of the team against the West Indies in Jamaica in March 1972.

On the final day, Ashe pointedly and symbolically wore red, white and blue wristbands throughout the match and wore his U.S.-emblazoned Davis Cup warm-up jacket when walking out onto Centre Court and during the award ceremony while receiving the trophy and winner's cheque for GBP £10,000 (1975 equivalent US$23,000). Soon after the final, Connors dropped the libel suit.

Ashe played for a few more years and won the Australian Open doubles with Tony Roche in January 1977, but a left foot heel injury requiring surgery a month later and subsequent long-term rehabilitation saw his world ranking drop to a lowly 257th before a remarkable comeback saw him rise back to 13th in the world again the following year at the age of 35. However, after undergoing heart surgery in December 1979, Ashe officially retired on April 16, 1980, at the age of 36. His career record was 818 wins, 260 losses, and 51 titles.

== Post-tennis career and activism ==
President Reagan greets Arthur Ashe (left) in 1982

After his retirement, Ashe took on many roles, including writing for Time magazine and The Washington Post, commentating for ABC Sports and HBO from the early 1980s until a few months before his death, founding the National Junior Tennis League, and serving as captain of the U.S. Davis Cup team from 1981 to 1985. He was elected to the International Tennis Hall of Fame in 1985.

Ashe was an active civil rights supporter. In 1982, he joined with Harry Belafonte to form the group Artists and Athletes Against Apartheid, which called for a cultural boycott of South Africa. Ashe was arrested on January 11, 1985, for protesting outside the Embassy of South Africa, Washington, D.C., during an anti-apartheid rally. Six years later, he joined musician and producer Quincy Jones as part of a delegation of 31 prominent African Americans who visited South Africa in 1991 to observe political change in the country as it approached racial integration. He was arrested again on September 18, 1992, outside the White House for protesting with TransAfrica on the recent crackdown on Haitian refugees.

In 1988, Ashe published a three-volume book titled A Hard Road to Glory: A History of the African-American Athlete, after working with a team of researchers for nearly six years. Ashe stated that the book was more important than any tennis titles.

After Ashe publicly acknowledged that he had contracted HIV, he founded the Arthur Ashe Foundation for the Defeat of AIDS, working to raise awareness about the virus and advocated teaching sex education and safe sex. He also fielded questions about his own diagnosis and attempted to clear up the misconception that only homosexual and bisexual men or IV drug users were at risk for contracting HIV. In a speech to the United Nations General Assembly on World AIDS Day, December 1, 1992, he addressed the growing need for AIDS awareness and increased research funding, saying: "We want to be able to look back and say to all concerned that we did what we had to do, when we had to do it, and with all the resources required."

Two months before his death, he founded the Arthur Ashe Institute for Urban Health to help address issues of inadequate health care delivery and was named Sports Illustrated magazine's Sportsman of the Year. He also spent much of the last years of his life writing his memoir, Days of Grace, finishing the manuscript less than a week before his death.

== Personal life ==
In October 1976, Ashe met photographer and graphic artist Jeanne Moutoussamy at a United Negro College Fund benefit. Moutoussamy, who is of Afro-Guadeloupean and African-American heritage, is the daughter of architect John Moutoussamy. On February 20, 1977, they were married in the Church Center for the United Nations in New York City in a ceremony officiated by Andrew Young, the United States ambassador to the United Nations.

In December 1986, Ashe and Moutoussamy adopted a daughter. They named their daughter Camera, after her mother's professional instrument.

=== Health ===
In July 1979, at the age of 36, Ashe suffered a heart attack while holding a tennis clinic in New York. In view of his high level of fitness as an athlete, his condition drew attention to the hereditary aspect of heart disease; his mother already had cardiovascular disease at the time of her death at age 27, and his father had suffered his first heart attack at age 55, and a second, at age 59, just a week before Ashe's own attack. Cardiac catheterization revealed one of Ashe's arteries was completely closed, another was 95 percent closed, and a third was closed 50 percent in two places. He underwent a quadruple bypass operation performed by Dr. John Hutchinson on December 13, 1979.

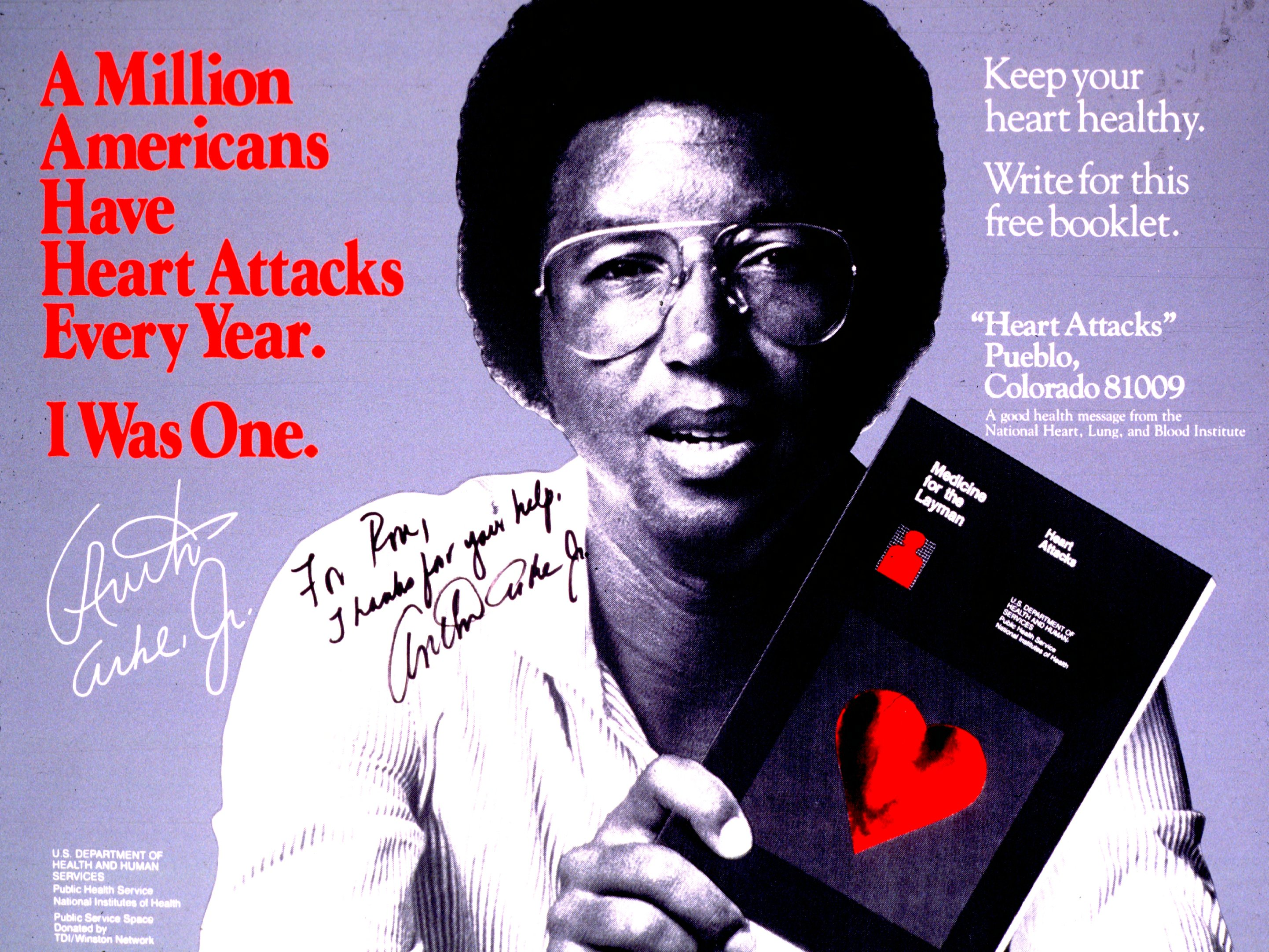
Ashe promoting heart health after his heart attack

A few months after the operation, Ashe was on the verge of making his return to professional tennis. However, during a family trip in Cairo, Egypt, he developed chest pains while running. He stopped running and returned to see a physician accompanied by his close friend Douglas Stein. Stein urged him to return to New York City so he could be close to his cardiologist, his surgeon and top-class medical facilities. In 1983, he underwent a second round of heart surgery to correct the previous bypass surgery. After the surgery, Ashe became national campaign chairman for the American Heart Association.

In September 1988, Ashe was hospitalized after experiencing paralysis in his right arm. After undergoing exploratory brain surgery and a number of tests, doctors discovered that he had toxoplasmosis, a parasitic disease that is commonly found in people infected with HIV. A subsequent test later revealed that he was HIV-positive. Ashe and his doctors believed he contracted the virus from blood transfusions he received during his second heart surgery. He and his wife decided to keep his illness private for the sake of their daughter, who was then two years old.

In September 1992, Ashe suffered a mild heart attack.

In 1992, a friend of Ashe who worked for USA Today heard that he was ill and called him to confirm the story. Ashe decided to preempt USA Today's plans to publish the story about his illness and, on April 8, 1992, publicly announced he had contracted HIV. He blamed USA Today for forcing him to go public with the news but also stated that he was relieved that he no longer had to lie about his illness. After the announcement, hundreds of readers called or wrote letters to USA Today criticizing their choice to run the story about Ashe that forced him to publicize his illness.

=== Death ===
On February 6, 1993, Ashe died from AIDS-related pneumonia at New York Hospital at 3:13 p.m., at age 49. His funeral was held at the Arthur Ashe Athletic Center in Richmond, Virginia, on February 10. Governor Douglas Wilder, who was a friend of Ashe's, allowed his body to lie in state at the Governor's Mansion in Richmond. More than 5,000 people lined up to walk past the casket. Andrew Young, who had performed the service for Ashe's wedding in 1977, officiated at his funeral. Over 6,000 mourners attended. Ashe requested that he be buried alongside his mother in Woodland Cemetery in Richmond, Virginia.

On February 12, 1993, a memorial service for Ashe was held at the Cathedral of St. John the Divine in Manhattan.

== Legacy ==
Ashe remains the only black man to win the singles title at Wimbledon, the US Open, or Australian Open. He is one of only two men of black African ancestry to win any Grand Slam singles title, the other being France's Yannick Noah, who won the French Open in 1983. He also led the United States to victory for three consecutive years (1968–70) in the Davis Cup.

In his 1979 autobiography, Jack Kramer, the long-time tennis promoter and a world no. 1 player himself in the 1940s, ranked Ashe as one of the 21 best players of all time.

=== Awards and honors ===
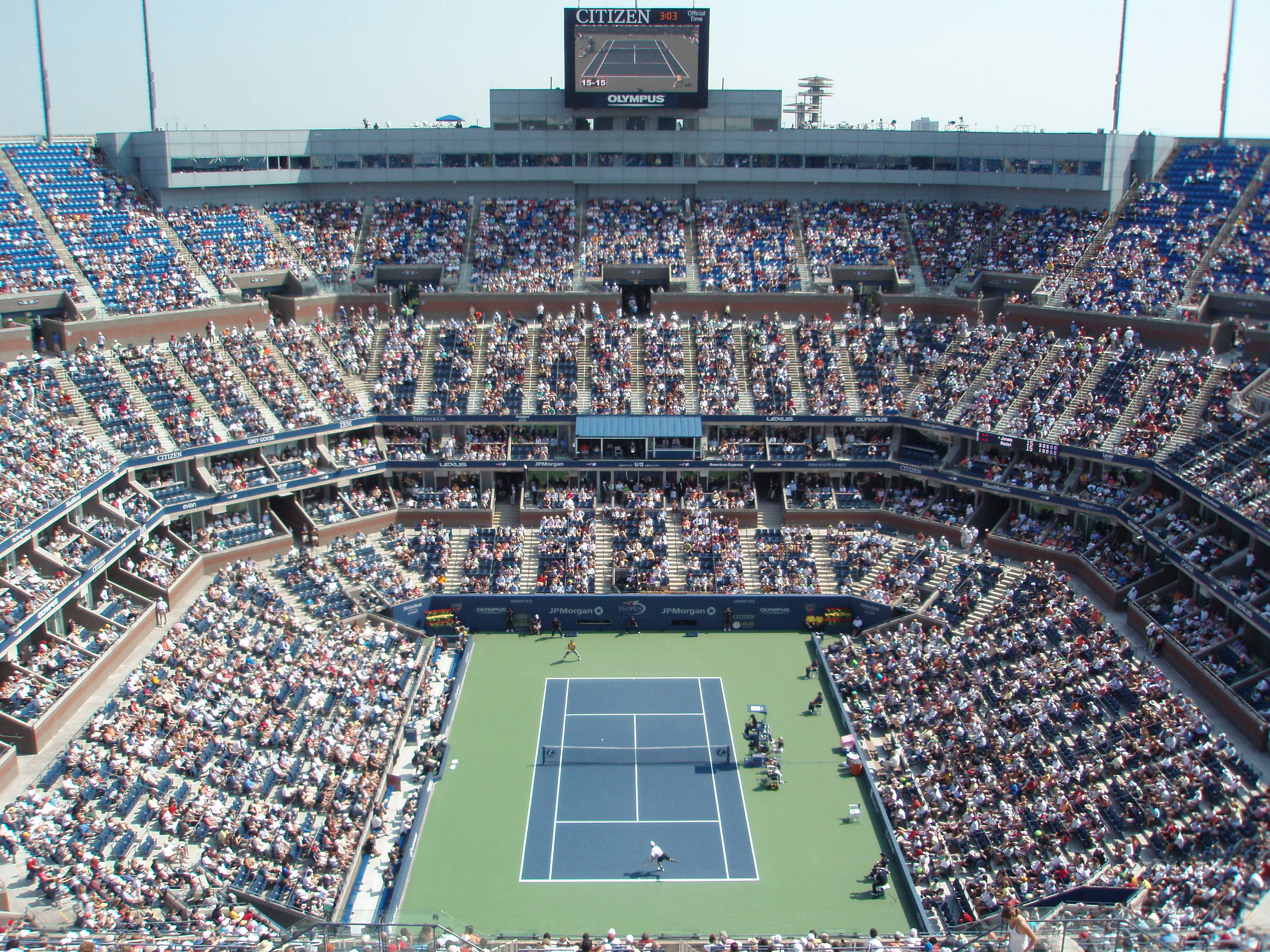
The Arthur Ashe Stadium at the 2007 US Open

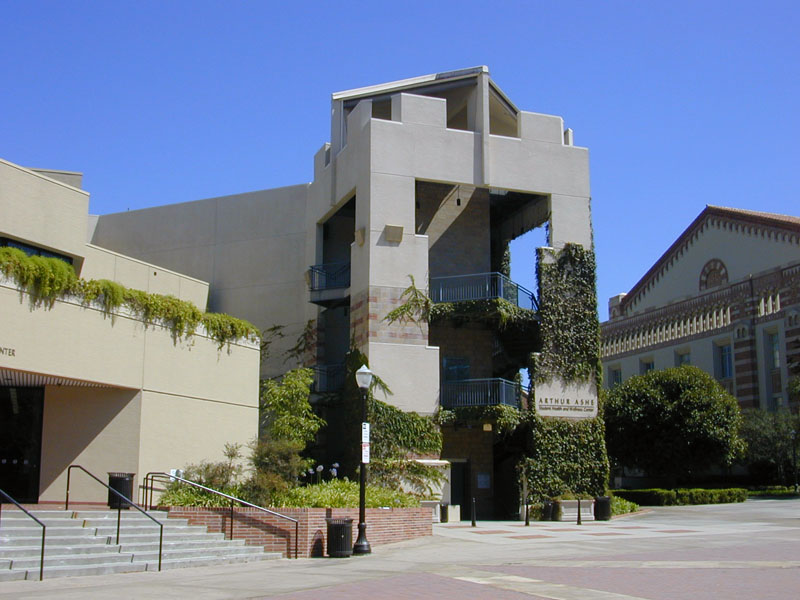
The Arthur Ashe Student Health and Wellness Center, on the campus of UCLA

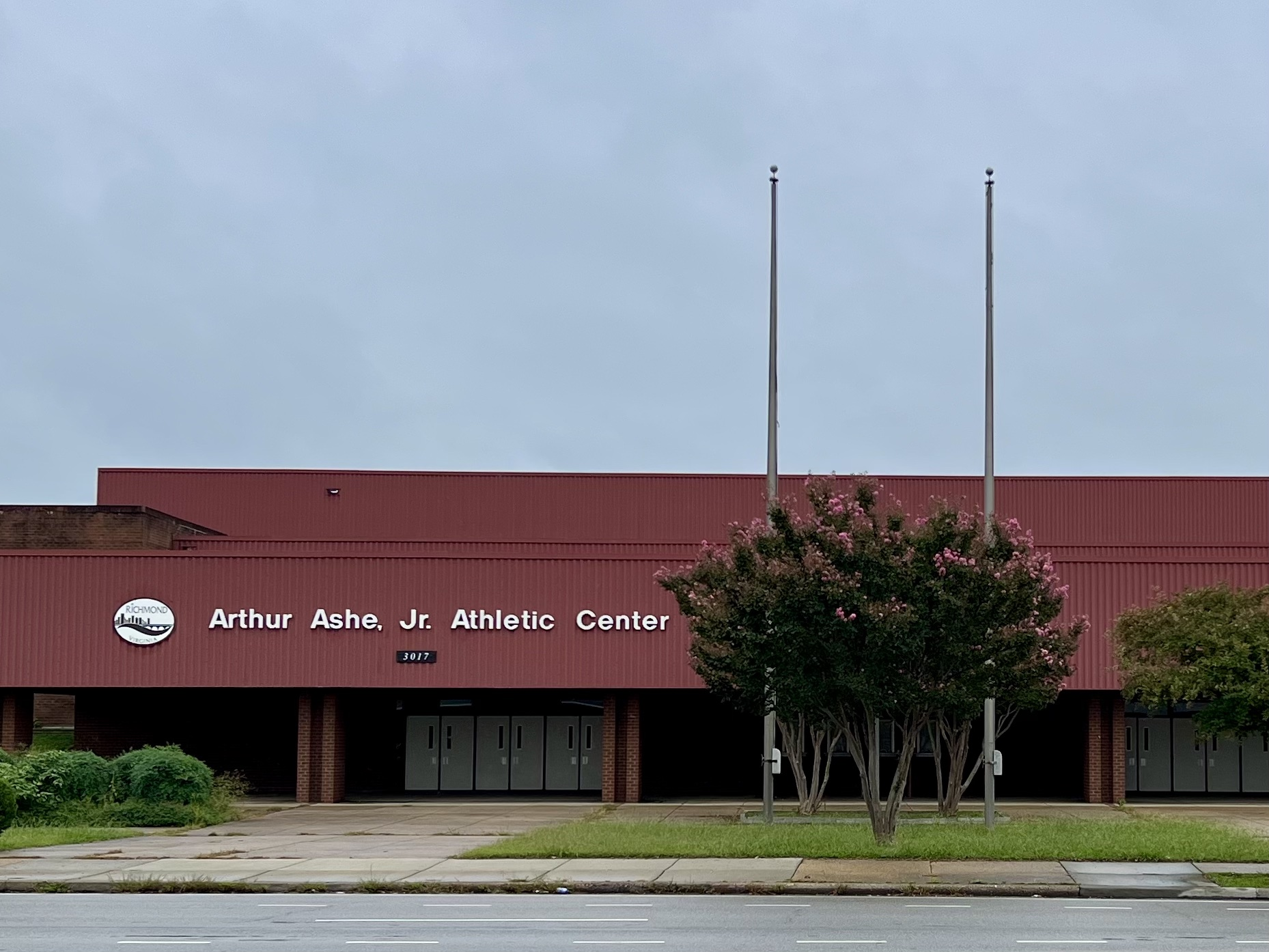
Arthur Ashe, Jr. Athletic Center in Richmond, Virginia.

- In 1974, Ashe released one the sport's first instructional long-playing records, "Learn Tennis with Arthur Ashe. For Beginners and Advanced Players", co-produced by Richard B. Thompson.
- In 1975, Arthur Ashe received the inaugural ATP Player of the Year Award.
- In 1975 he received the BBC Overseas Sports Personality of the Year.
- In 1977, he received the ATP Sportsmanship Award, voted for by other ATP-tour players.
- In 1979, Ashe was awarded ATP Comeback Player of the Year and was inducted into the Virginia Sports Hall of Fame. Commenting on the induction, the Hall started: "Arthur Ashe was certainly a hero to people of all ages and races, and his legacy continues to touch the lives of many today. For Arthur Ashe, tennis was a means to an end. Although he had a lucrative tennis career, it was always more than personal glory and individual accolades. He used his status as an elite tennis player to speak out against the moral inequalities that existed both in and out of the tennis world. Ashe sincerely wanted to bring about change in the world. What made him stand out was that he became a world champion along the way."
- In 1982, The Arthur Ashe Athletic Center, a 6,000-seat multi-purpose arena, was built in Richmond, Virginia. It hosts local sporting events and concerts.
- Ashe was inducted into the Intercollegiate Tennis Association (ITA) Hall of Fame in 1983.
- In 1985, he was inducted into the International Tennis Hall of Fame.
- In 1986, Ashe won a Sports Emmy for co-writing the documentary A Hard Road to Glory, with Bryan Polivka.
- In 1991, Ashe received an Honorary Doctorate of Humane Letters from The College of William and Mary in Virginia
- On December 3, 1992, Ashe was presented with the "Sports Legend" Award by the American Sportscasters Association at their Eighth annual Hall of Fame Awards Dinner in New York City.
- On June 20, 1993, Ashe was posthumously awarded the Presidential Medal of Freedom by President Bill Clinton.
- In 1993, Ashe was awarded the Congressional Black Caucus Foundation's George Thomas "Mickey" Leland Award
- In 1993, Arthur Ashe was also awarded posthumously the Arthur Ashe Humanitarian of the Year Award by the ATP, in honor of his career-long contributions to humanitarianism.
- In 1993, Arthur Ashe received the Award for Greatest Public Service Benefiting the Disadvantaged, an award given out annually by Jefferson Awards.
- In 1996 the city of Richmond posthumously honored Arthur Ashe's life with a statue by sculptor Paul DiPasquale on Monument Avenue, a place traditionally reserved for statues of key figures of the Confederacy. This decision led to some controversy in a city that was the capital of the Confederate States during the American Civil War.
- The main stadium at the USTA National Tennis Center in Flushing Meadows Park, where the US Open is played, is named Arthur Ashe Stadium. This is also the home of the annual Arthur Ashe Kids' Day.
- In 2002, Ashe winning Wimbledon in 1975 was voted 95th in Channel 4's 100 Greatest Sporting Moments.
- In 2002, scholar Molefi Kete Asante listed Arthur Ashe on his list of 100 Greatest African Americans.
- In 2005, the United States Postal Service announced the release of an Arthur Ashe commemorative stamp, the first to feature a cover of Sports Illustrated magazine.
- Also in 2005, TENNIS Magazine ranked him 30th in their list of the 40 Greatest Players of the TENNIS Era.
- ESPN's annual sports awards, the ESPY Awards, hands out the Arthur Ashe for Courage Award to a member of the sports world who best exhibits courage in the face of adversity.
- Philadelphia's Arthur Ashe Youth Tennis and Education Center (now named Legacy Youth Tennis and Education Center) and Richmond's Arthur Ashe Athletic Center have been named for Ashe.
- The Arthur Ashe Student Health and Wellness Center at Ashe's alma mater, UCLA, is named for him. It opened in 1997.
- On June 22, 2019, the renaming of the Boulevard as Arthur Ashe Boulevard was celebrated in Richmond, Virginia.
- Diverse: Issues In Higher Education sponsors the Arthur Ashe Jr. Sports Scholar Awards to honor students of color who have excelled in the classroom as well as on the athletic field.

== Grand Slam tournament finals ==
=== Singles: 7 finals (3 titles, 4 runner-ups) ===
Result	Year	Championship	Surface	Opponent	Score
Loss	1966	Australian Open	Grass	(Australia) Roy Emerson	4–6, 8–6, 2–6, 3–6
Loss	1967	Australian Open	Grass	(Australia) Roy Emerson	4–6, 1–6, 4–6
↓ Open Era ↓
Win	1968	US Open	Grass	(Netherlands) Tom Okker	14–12, 5–7, 6–3, 3–6, 6–3
Win	1970	Australian Open	Grass	(Australia) Dick Crealy	6–4, 9–7, 6–2
Loss	1971	Australian Open	Grass	(Australia) Ken Rosewall	1–6, 5–7, 3–6
Loss	1972	US Open	Grass	(Romania) Ilie Năstase	6–3, 3–6, 7–6, 4–6, 3–6
Win	1975	Wimbledon	Grass	(United States) Jimmy Connors	6–1, 6–1, 5–7, 6–4

=== Doubles: 5 finals (2 titles, 3 runners-up) ===
Result	Year	Championship	Surface	Partner	Opponents	Score
Loss	1968	US Open	Grass	(Spain) Andrés Gimeno	(United States) Robert Lutz (United States) Stan Smith	9–11, 1–6, 5–7
Loss	1970	French Open	Clay	(United States) Charlie Pasarell	(Romania) Ilie Năstase (Romania) Ion Țiriac	2–6, 4–6, 3–6
Win	1971	French Open	Clay	(United States) Marty Riessen	(United States) Tom Gorman (United States) Stan Smith	6–8, 4–6, 6–3, 6–4, 11–9
Loss	1971	Wimbledon	Grass	(United States) Dennis Ralston	(Australia) Roy Emerson (Australia) Rod Laver	6–4, 7–9, 8–6, 4–6, 4–6
Win	1977^{(J)}	Australian Open	Grass	(Australia) Tony Roche	(United States) Charlie Pasarell (United States) Erik van Dillen	6–4, 6–4

== Grand Slam singles performance timeline ==
Key
W	F	SF	QF	#R	RR	Q#	DNQ	A	NH

(W) winner; (F) finalist; (SF) semifinalist; (QF) quarterfinalist; (#R) rounds 4, 3, 2, 1; (RR) round-robin stage; (Q#) qualification round; (DNQ) did not qualify; (A) absent; (NH) not held; (SR) strike rate (events won / competed); (W–L) win–loss record.

Tournament	1959	1960	1961	1962	1963	1964	1965	1966	1967	1968	1969	1970	1971	1972	1973	1974	1975	1976	1977^{1}		1978	1979	SR	W–L
Australian Open	A	A	A	A	A	A	A	F	F	A	A	W	F	A	A	A	A	A	QF	A	SF	A	1 / 6	25–5
French Open	A	A	A	A	A	A	A	A	A	A	4R	QF	QF	A	4R	4R	A	4R	A		4R	3R	0 / 8	25–8
Wimbledon	A	A	A	A	3R	4R	4R	A	A	SF	SF	4R	3R	A	A	3R	W	4R	A		1R	1R	1 / 12	35–11
US Open	1R	2R	2R	2R	3R	4R	SF	3R	A	W	SF	QF	SF	F	3R	QF	4R	2R	A		4R	A	1 / 18	53–17
Win–loss	0–1	1–1	1–1	1–1	4–2	6–2	8–2	7–2	4–1	11–1	13–3	15–3	15–4	6–1	5–2	9–3	10–1	7–3	3–1		10–4	2–2	3 / 44	138–41

^{1}The Australian Open was held twice in 1977, in January and December.

== Singles titles (76) ==
Note: Ashe won 28 titles before the Open Era

No.	Date	Tournament	Surface	Opponent	Score	Ref
1.	Jul 1961	Eastern Clay Court Championships, Hackensack, US	Clay	(United States) Robert M. Baker	6–3, 2–6, 6–3, 4–6, 6–4	
2.	Aug 1961	American Tennis Association Championships, Hampton, US	?	(United States) Wilbur H. Jenkins	6–1, 6–1, 6–3	
3.	Apr 1962	Ojai Tennis Tournament, Ojai, US	Hard	(United States) David R. Reed	6–3, 6–2	
4.	Jan 1962	Detroit Invitational, Detroit, US	?	(United States) William (Bill) H.Wright	6–2, 6–2	
5.	Aug 1962	American Tennis Association Championships, Wilberforce, US	?	(United States) Wilbur H. Jenkins	6–1, 6–2, 6–0	
6.	Sep 1963	Pacific Southwest Championshipss, Los Angeles, US	Hard	(United States) Whitney Reed	2–6, 9–7, 6–2	
7.	Dec 1963	U.S. Hard Court Championships, US	Hard	(United States) Allen Fox	6–3, 12–10	
8.	Aug 1964	Eastern Grass Court Championships, New Jersey, US	Grass	(United States) Clark Graebner	4–6, 8–6, 6–4, 6–3	
9.	Sep 1964	Perth Amboy Invitational, New Jersey, US	?	(United States) Gene Scott	6–3, 8–6, 6–2	
10.	Sep 1965	Colonial National Invitational, Texas, US	?	(Australia) Fred Stolle	6–3, 6–4	
11.	Nov 1965	Queensland Lawn Tennis Championships, Australia	Grass	(Australia) Roy Emerson	3–6, 6–2, 6–3, 3–6, 6–1	
12.	Dec 1965	South Australian Championships	Grass	(Australia) Roy Emerson	7–9, 7–5, 6–0, 6–4	
13.	Jan 1966	Western Australian Championships, Perth	?	(United States) Cliff Richey	3–6, 6–2, 6–3, 6–4	
14.	Jan 1966	Tasmanian Championships, Australia	?	(Australia) John Newcombe	6–4, 6–4, 12–10	
15.	Mar 1966	Thunderbird Invitational Tennis Tournament, Phoenix, US	?	(United States) Jim Osborne	3–6, 6–3, 6–2	
16.	Apr 1966	Caribe Hilton Invitational, Puerto Rico	?	(United States) Cliff Richey	6–3, 6–4, 6–3	
17.	Apr 1966	Dallas Invitational, Texas, US	?	(United States) Charles Pasarell	7–9, 6–4, 6–4	
18.	Feb 1967	Philadelphia International, US	?	(United States) Charles Pasarell	7–5, 9–7, 6–3	
19.	Feb 1967	Concord International Indoor, Kiamesha Lake, US	Hard (i)	(Brazil) Thomaz Koch	6–3, 2–6, 6–2	
20.	Feb 1967	Western Indoor Championship	?	(United States) Clark Graebner	3–6, 6–3, 6–3	
21.	Apr 1967	Long Island Invitational, US	?	round-robin		
22.	Jul 1967	National Clay Court Championship, US	Clay	(United States) Marty Riessen	4–6, 6–3, 6–1, 7–5	
23.	Dec 1967	Long Island Masters, New York, US	?	(United States) Ronald Holmberg	31–27	
24.	Jan 1968	Caribe Hilton Invitational, Puerto Rico	?	(United States) Ronald Holmberg	6–4, 6–4	
25.	Feb 1968	*Fidelity Bankers Invitational, Richmond, US	?	(United States) Chuck McKinley	6–2, 6–1	
26.	Feb 1968	Concord International Indoor, Kiamesha Lake	Hard (i)	(United States) Jan Leschly	6–3, 15–13	
27.	Mar 1968	Madison Square Garden Challenge Trophy, New York	Carpet (i)	(Australia) Roy Emerson	6–4, 6–4, 7–5	
28.	Apr 1968	*Charlotte Invitation, Charlotte, US	?	(United States) Ronald Holmberg	6–2, 6–4	
↓ Open Era ↓
29.	Jun 1968	West of England Championships, Bristol	Grass	(United States) Clark Graebner	6–4, 6–3	
30.	Jul 1968	*Pennsylvania Lawn Tennis Championships, Haverford, US	Grass	(United States) Marty Riessen	6–2, 6–3, 6–3	
31.	Aug 1968	U.S. Amateur Championships, Boston, US*	Grass	(United States) Bob Lutz	4–6, 6–3, 8–10, 6–0, 6–4	
32.	Sep 1968	US Open, New York*	Grass	(Netherlands) Tom Okker	14–12, 5–7, 6–3, 3–6, 6–3	
33.	Sep 1968	Las Vegas Invitational, US	?	(United States) Clark Graebner	9–7, 6–3	
34.	Dec 1968	Queensland Championships, Brisbane, Australia*	Grass	(United States) Stan Smith	6–4, 1–6, 9–7, 4–6, 7–5	
35.	Feb 1969	Balboa Bay Club Invitational	?	(United States) Charles Pasarell	shared title, rain	
36.	Apr 1969	Caribe Hilton International, San Juan, Puerto Rico*	Hard	(United States) Charles Pasarell	5–7, 5–7, 6–0, 6–4, 6–3	
37.	Jan 1970	Australian Open, Melbourne*	Grass	(Australia) Dick Crealy	6–4, 9–7, 6–2	
38.	Feb 1970	Richmond WCT, Richmond, US*	Carpet (i)	(United States) Stan Smith	6–2, 13–11	
39.	Mar 1970	Jacksonville Open, Florida, US*	Clay	(New Zealand) Brian Fairlie	6–3, 4–6, 6–3	
40.	Apr 1970	Caribe Hilton International, San Juan, Puerto Rico*	Hard	(United States) Cliff Richey	6–4, 6–3, 1–6, 6–3	
41.	Apr 1970	Bacardi Invitational, Bermuda	?	(Socialist Federal Republic of Yugoslavia) Željko Franulović	8–6, 7–5	
42.	May 1970	Glenwood Manor Invitational, Kansas City, US*	Hard	(United States) Clark Graebner	7–6, 6–1	
43.	May 1970	Central California Championships, Sacramento, US*	Hard	(United States) Barry MacKay	6–4, 6–2, 3–6, 10–8	
44.	Jun 1970	John Player tournament	?	round-robin		
45.	Sep 1970	Seattle Tennis Invitational, US	?	(United States) Tom Gorman	6–3, 6–4	
46.	Sep 1970	Berkeley, US*	Hard	(United States) Cliff Richey	6–4, 6–2, 6–4	
47.	Oct 1970	Denver Invitational, Denver, US*	Hard (i)	(United States) Charlie Pasarell	6–2, 5–6, 6–3	
48.	Nov 1970	Paris, France*	Carpet (i)	(United States) Marty Riessen	7–6, 6–4, 6–3	
49.	Apr 1971	Charlotte, US*	Hard	(United States) Stan Smith	6–3, 6–3	
50.	Nov 1971	Stockholm WCT, Sweden*	Hard (i)	(Czechoslovakia) Jan Kodeš	6–1, 3–6, 6–2, 1–6, 6–4	
51.	Jul 1972	Louisville WCT, US*	Clay	(United Kingdom) Mark Cox	6–4, 6–4	
52.	Sep 1972	Montreal WCT, Canada*	Carpet (i)	(Australia) Roy Emerson	7–5, 4–6, 6–2, 6–3	
53.	Nov 1972	Rotterdam WCT, Netherlands*	Carpet (i)	(Netherlands) Tom Okker	3–6, 6–2, 6–1	
54.	Nov 1972	Rome WCT Winter Finals Italy*	Carpet (i)	(United States) Bob Lutz	6–2, 3–6, 6–3, 3–6, 7–6	
55.	Feb 1973	Chicago WCT, US*	Carpet (i)	(United Kingdom) Roger Taylor	3–6, 7–6^{(11–9)}, 7–6^{(7–2)}	
56.	Jul 1973	Washington, US*	Clay	(Netherlands) Tom Okker	6–4, 6–2	
57.	Feb 1974	Bologna WCT, Italy *	Carpet (i)	(United Kingdom) Mark Cox	6–4, 7–5	
58.	Mar 1974	Barcelona WCT, Spain*	Carpet (i)	(Sweden) Björn Borg	6–4, 3–6, 6–3	
59.	Nov 1974	Stockholm Open< Sweden*	Hard (i)	(Netherlands) Tom Okker	6–2, 6–2	
60.	Feb 1975	Barcelona WCT, Spain *	Carpet (i)	(Sweden) Björn Borg	7–6, 6–3	
61.	Feb 1975	Rotterdam WCT, Netherlands*	Carpet (i)	(Netherlands) Tom Okker	3–6, 6–2, 6–4	
62.	Mar 1975	Munich WCT, Germany*	Carpet (i)	(Sweden) Björn Borg	6–4, 7–6	
63.	Apr 1975	Stockholm WCT, Sweden*	Carpet (i)	(Netherlands) Tom Okker	6–4, 6–2	
64.	May 1975	Dallas WCT Finals, US*	Carpet (i)	(Sweden) Björn Borg	3–6, 6–4, 6–4, 6–0	
65.	Jun 1975	Kent Championships, UK*	Grass	(United States) Roscoe Tanner	7–5, 6–4	
66.	Jun 1975	Wimbledon*	Grass	(United States) Jimmy Connors	6–1, 6–1, 5–7, 6–4	
67.	Sep 1975	Los Angeles, US*	Carpet (i)	(United States) Roscoe Tanner	3–6, 7–5, 6–3	
68.	Sep 1975	San Francisco, US*	Carpet (i)	(Argentina) Guillermo Vilas	6–0, 7–6^{(7–4)}	
69.	Jan 1976	Columbus WCT, US*	Carpet (i)	(Rhodesia) Andrew Pattison	3–6, 6–3, 7–6^{(7–4)}	
70.	Jan 1976	Indianapolis WCT, US*	Carpet (i)	(United States) Vitas Gerulaitis	6–2, 6–7, 6–4	
71.	Feb 1976	Richmond WCT, US*	Carpet (i)	(United States) Brian Gottfried	6–2, 6–4	
72.	Feb 1976	Rome WCT, Italy*	Clay	(United States) Bob Lutz	6–2, 0–6, 6–3	
73.	Feb 1976	Rotterdam WCT, Netherlands*	Carpet (i)	(United States) Bob Lutz	6–3, 6–3	
74.	Apr 1978	San Jose, US*	Carpet (i)	(South Africa) Bernard Mitton	6–7, 6–1, 6–2	
75.	Aug 1978	Columbus, US*	Clay	(United States) Bob Lutz	6–3, 6–4	
76.	Sep 1978	Los Angeles, US*	Carpet (i)	(United States) Brian Gottfried	6–2, 6–4	

- * 44 Open Era titles listed by the ATP website

== See also ==
- Arthur Ashe Courage Award
- Arthur Ashe Stadium
- Arthur Ashe Boulevard
- Arthur Ashe Kids' Day
- Arthur Ashe Monument

== Bibliography ==
- Ashe, Arthur; Clifford George Gewecke (1967). Advantage Ashe. University of Michigan: Coward-McCann. p. 192.
- Ashe, Arthur; Neil Amdur (1981). Off the court. New American Library. p. 230. ISBN 0-453-00400-8.
- Ashe, Arthur; Rampersad, Arnold (1993). Days of Grace: A Memoir. New York: Alfred A. Knopf. ISBN 0-679-42396-6.
- Ashe, Arthur (1993). A Hard Road to Glory: A History of the African-American Athlete. New York: Amistad. ISBN 1-56743-006-6.
- Collins, Bud; Hollander, Zander (1997). Bud Collins' Tennis Encyclopedia (3rd ed.). Detroit: Visible Ink Press. ISBN 978-1578590001.

Awards and achievements
Preceded by None	Player of the Year; 1975	Succeeded by (Sweden) Björn Borg
Preceded by (United States) Muhammad Ali	BBC Overseas Sports Personality of the Year; 1975	Succeeded by (Romania) Nadia Comăneci
