= 1974 Tokyo WCT =

- Date: 8–14 April
- Edition: 2nd
- Category: World Championship Tennis (WCT)
- Draw: 32S / 16D
- Prize money: $50,000
- Surface: Hard / outdoor
- Location: Tokyo, Japan
- Venue: National Tennis Stadium

Champions

Singles
- (Australia) Rod Laver

Doubles
- (South Africa) Raymond Moore / (New Zealand) Onny Parun
← 1972 ·	Tokyo WCT	· 1975 →

The 1974 Tokyo WCT, also known by its sponsored name Kawasaki Tennis Classic, was a men's tennis tournament played on outdoor hard courts at the National Tennis Stadium in Tokyo, Japan. The event was part of the Green Group of the 1974 World Championship Tennis circuit. It was the second edition of the tournament and was held from 8 April through 14 April 1974. Rod Laver won the singles title and the accompanying $10,000 first prize money.

== Finals ==
=== Singles ===
(Australia) Rod Laver defeated (Spain) Juan Gisbert 5–7, 6–2, 6–0

=== Doubles ===
(South Africa) Raymond Moore / (New Zealand) Onny Parun defeated (Spain) Juan Gisbert / (United Kingdom) Roger Taylor 4–6, 6–2, 6–4
