= List of Grand Slam men's singles champions =

Many changes in the Grand Slam tennis tournaments have affected the number of titles won by various players during its history. These changes have included the opening of the French national championships to international players in 1925, the elimination of the challenge round in 1922, and the admission of professional players in 1968 (the start of the Open Era).

All of these tournaments have been listed based on the modern definition of a tennis major, rather than when they were officially recognized by the ILTF. The Grand Slam tournaments are the annual four major tennis events played in the Open Era, which began in 1968, superseding the Amateur Era. The Australian and U.S. tournaments were officially recognized by the ILTF in 1924, and the French Championships followed a year later in 1925 when it became open to all international players. The United States Lawn Tennis Association (USLTA) had several grievances with the ILTF and refused to join when it was formed in 1913.

From 1913 to 1923, there were three official championships recognized by the ILTF:

- World Grass Court Championships – Wimbledon.
- World Hard Court Championships, held in Paris on clay courts.
- World Covered Court Championships, held in Europe on an indoor wood surface.

During that same time period the USLTA recognized the U.S. National Championships

- U.S. National Championships, held in New York on grass.

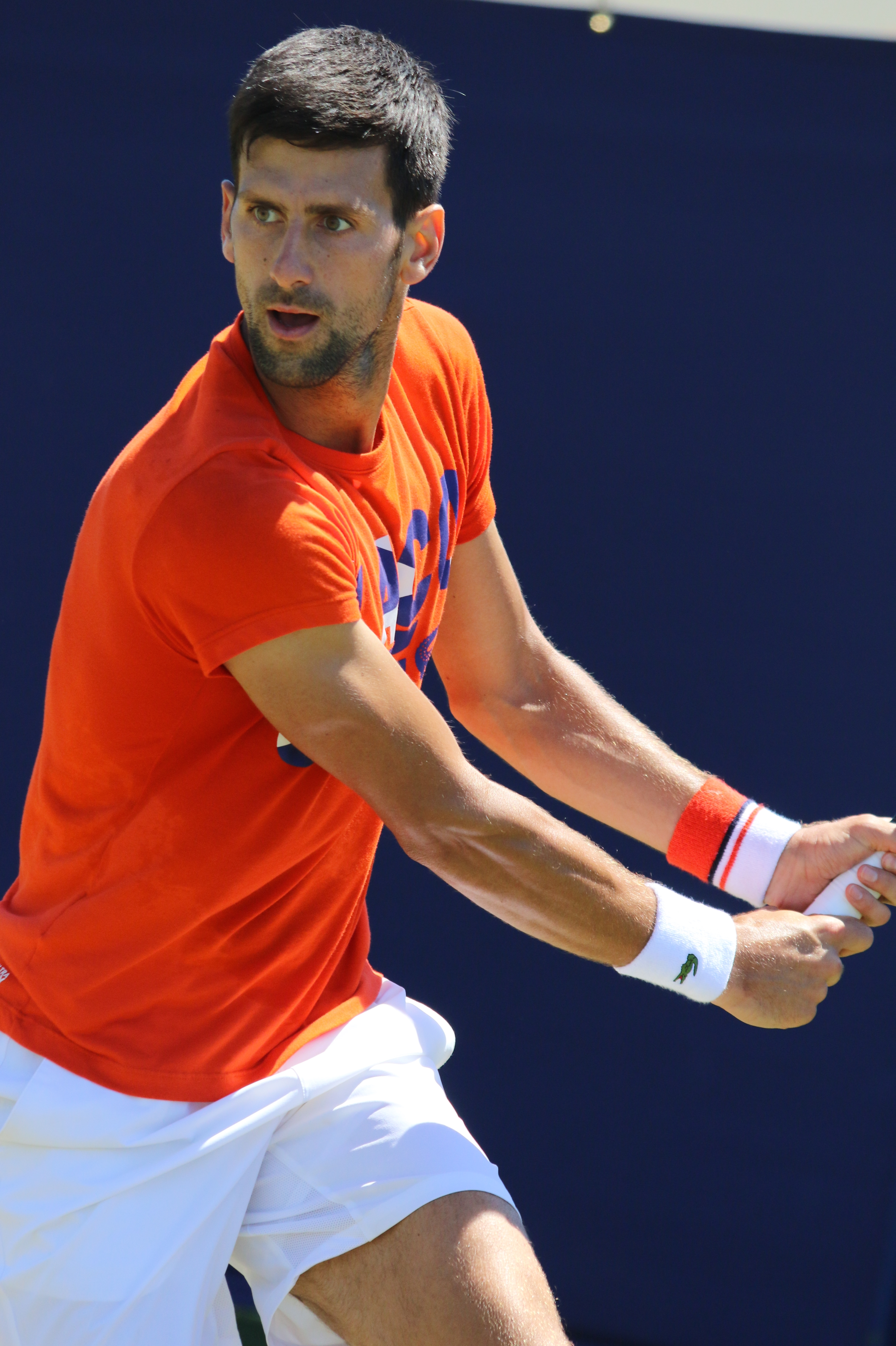
Novak Djokovic holds the all-time record of 24 major singles titles, including a record 10 Australian Open titles. He is the only singles player to hold all four majors simultaneously on three different surfaces (2016), and the only one to complete a triple Career Grand Slam (2023).

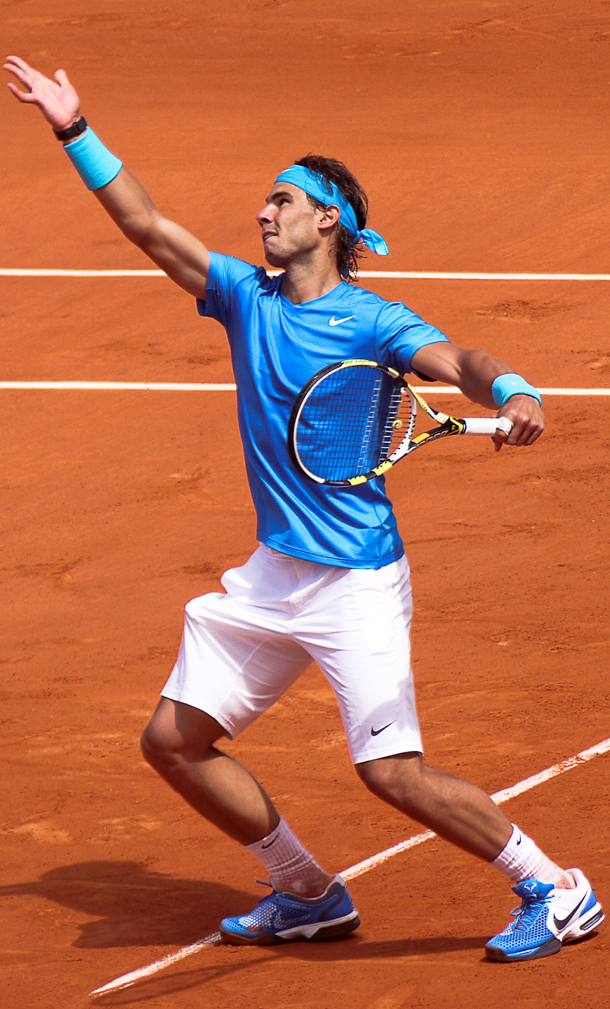
Rafael Nadal holds an all-time record of 14 French Open titles, the most at any slam in tennis history. He is the second man in the Open Era to complete a double Career Grand Slam (2022).

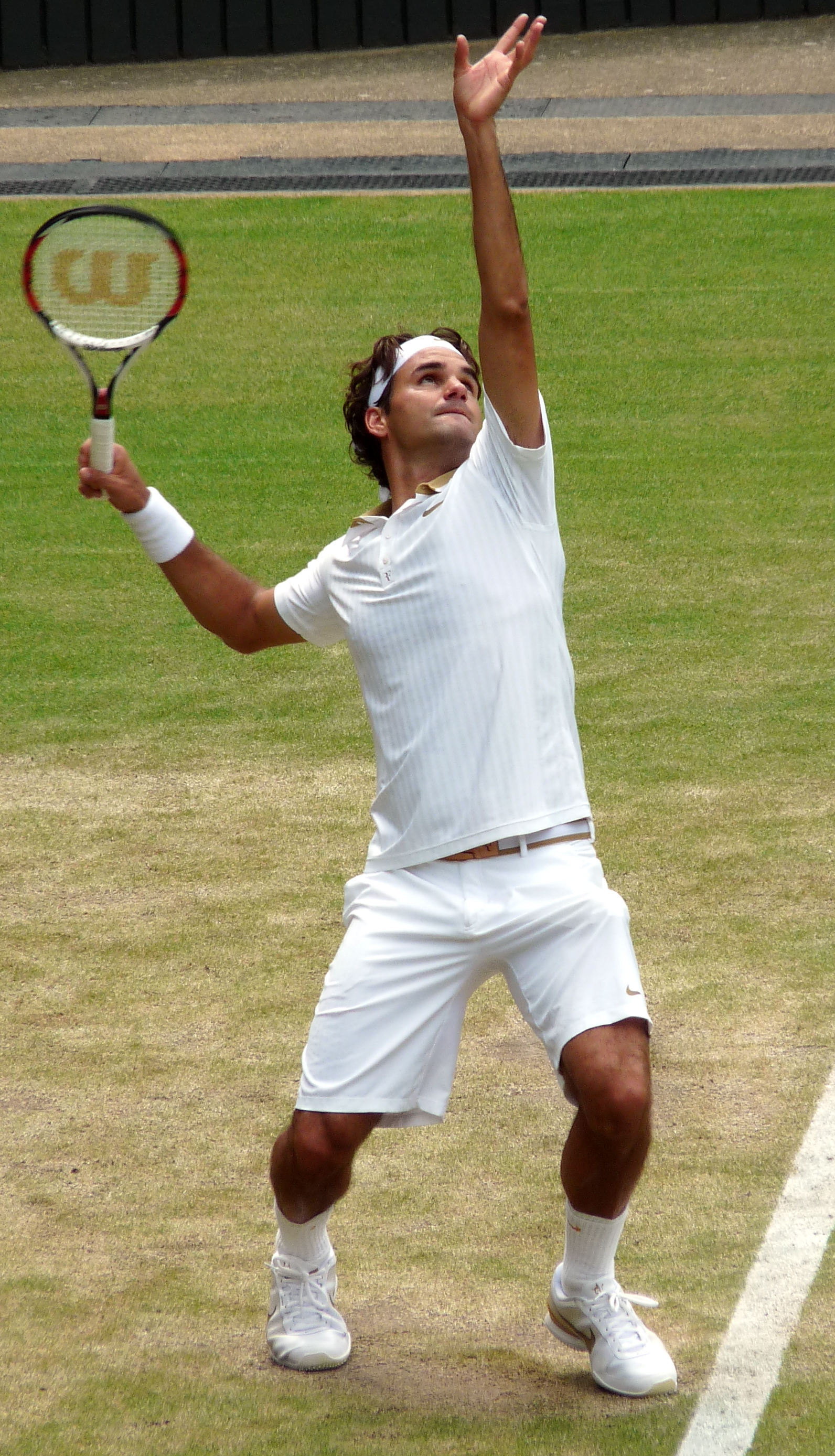
Roger Federer holds an all-time record of 8 Wimbledon titles. He also held the most major titles in singles between 2009 and 2022.

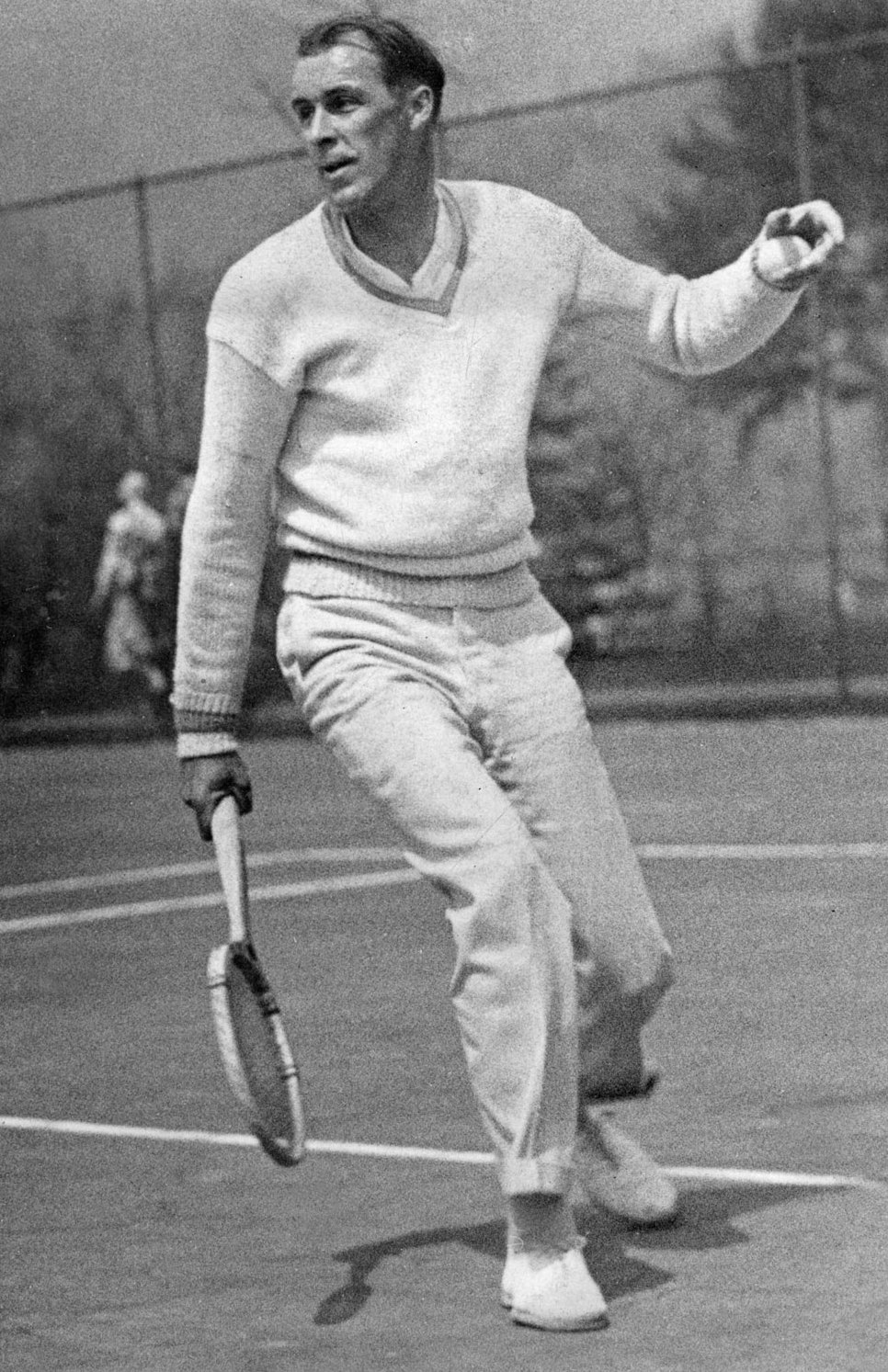
Bill Tilden won 10 major singles titles in the 1920s, including an all-time record of seven U.S. Championships titles.

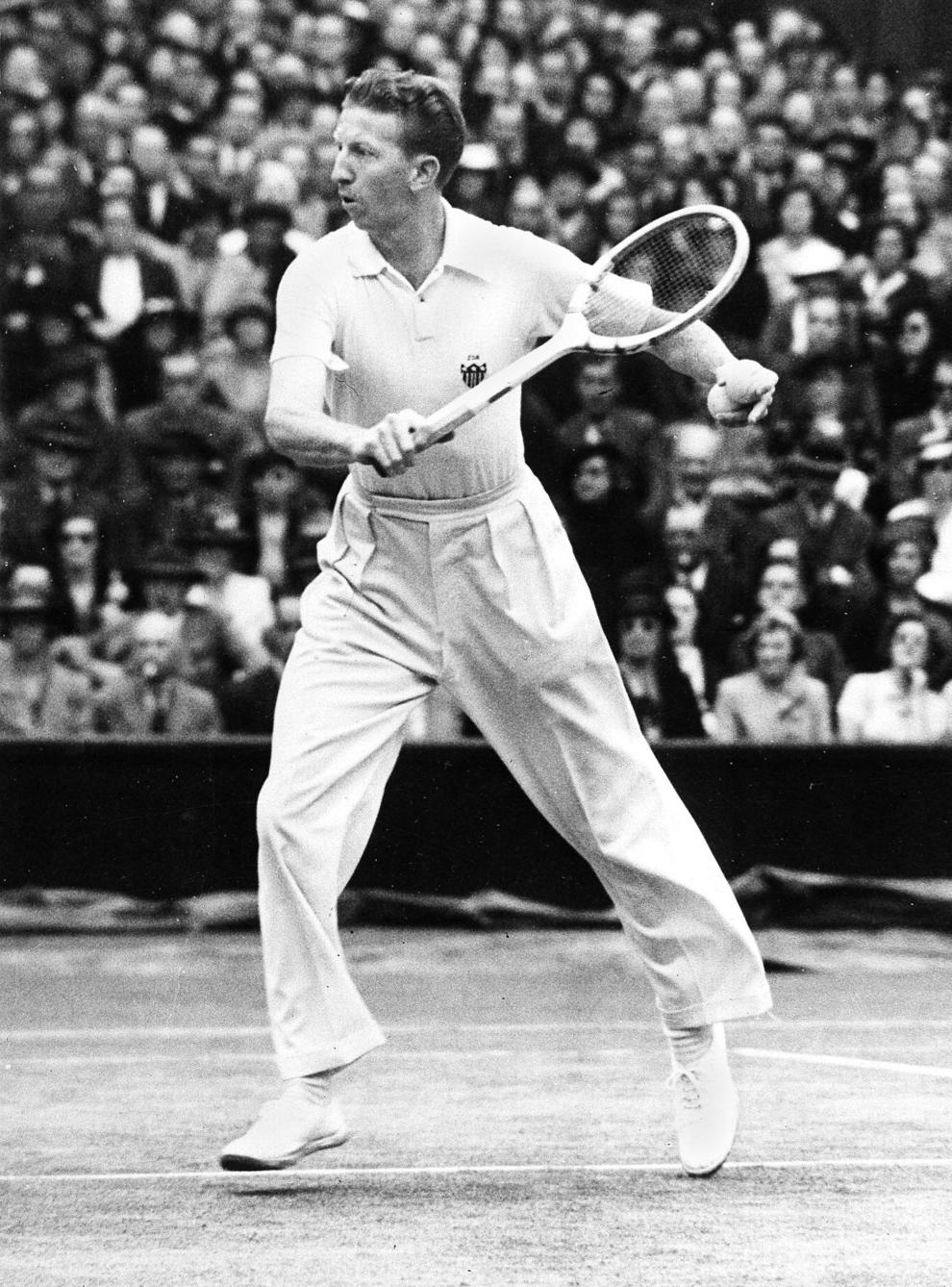
Don Budge is the only man to have won six consecutive major singles titles, from Wimbledon 1937 to U.S. Championships 1938, and the first player ever to complete a Grand Slam (1938).

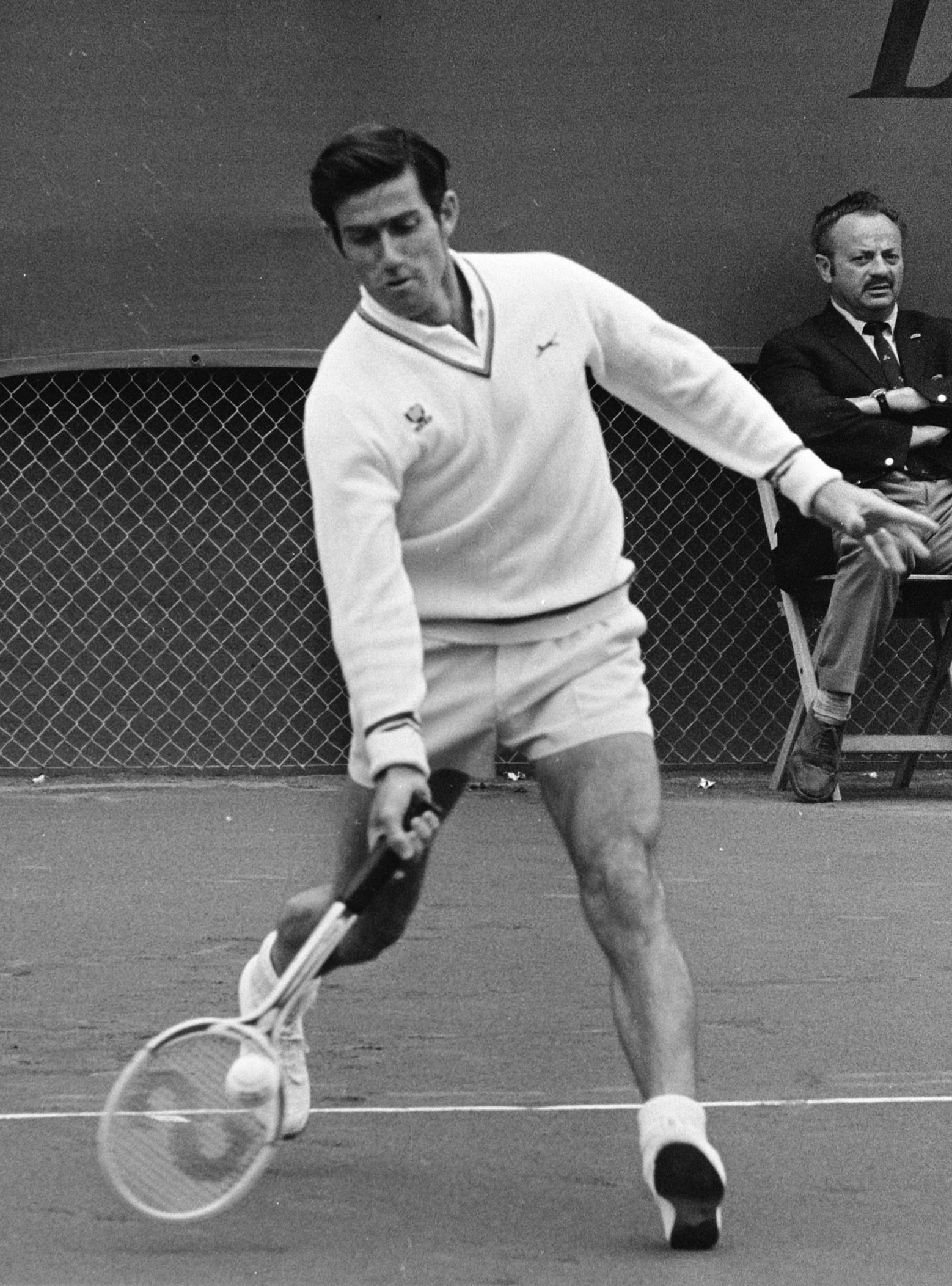
Ken Rosewall holds a record 15 Pro Major titles, and 23 major titles overall, counting both amateur and professional circuits.

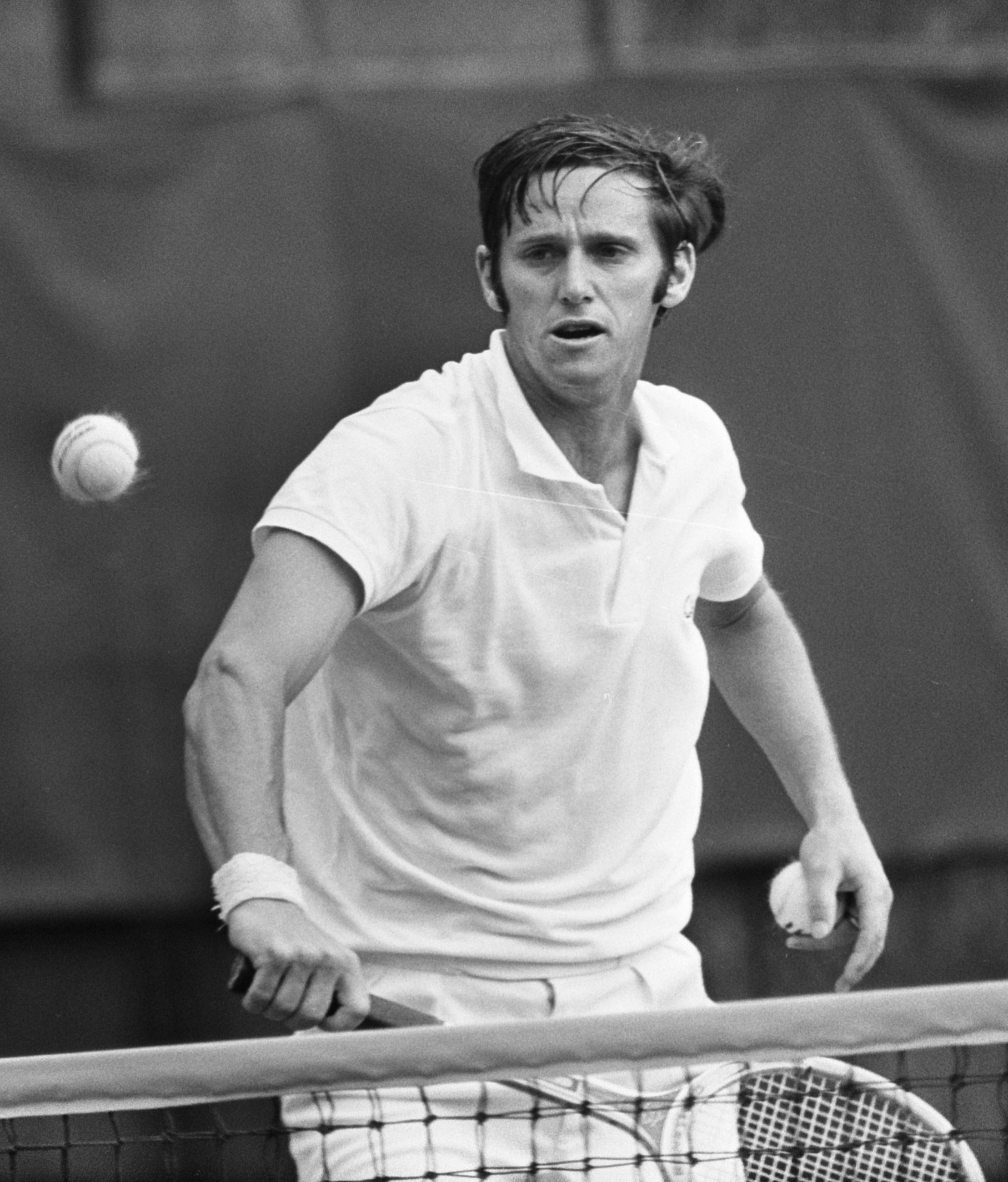
Roy Emerson was the first man in history to win each major title twice (1967), and the only man to have completed a Career Grand Slam in both singles and doubles.

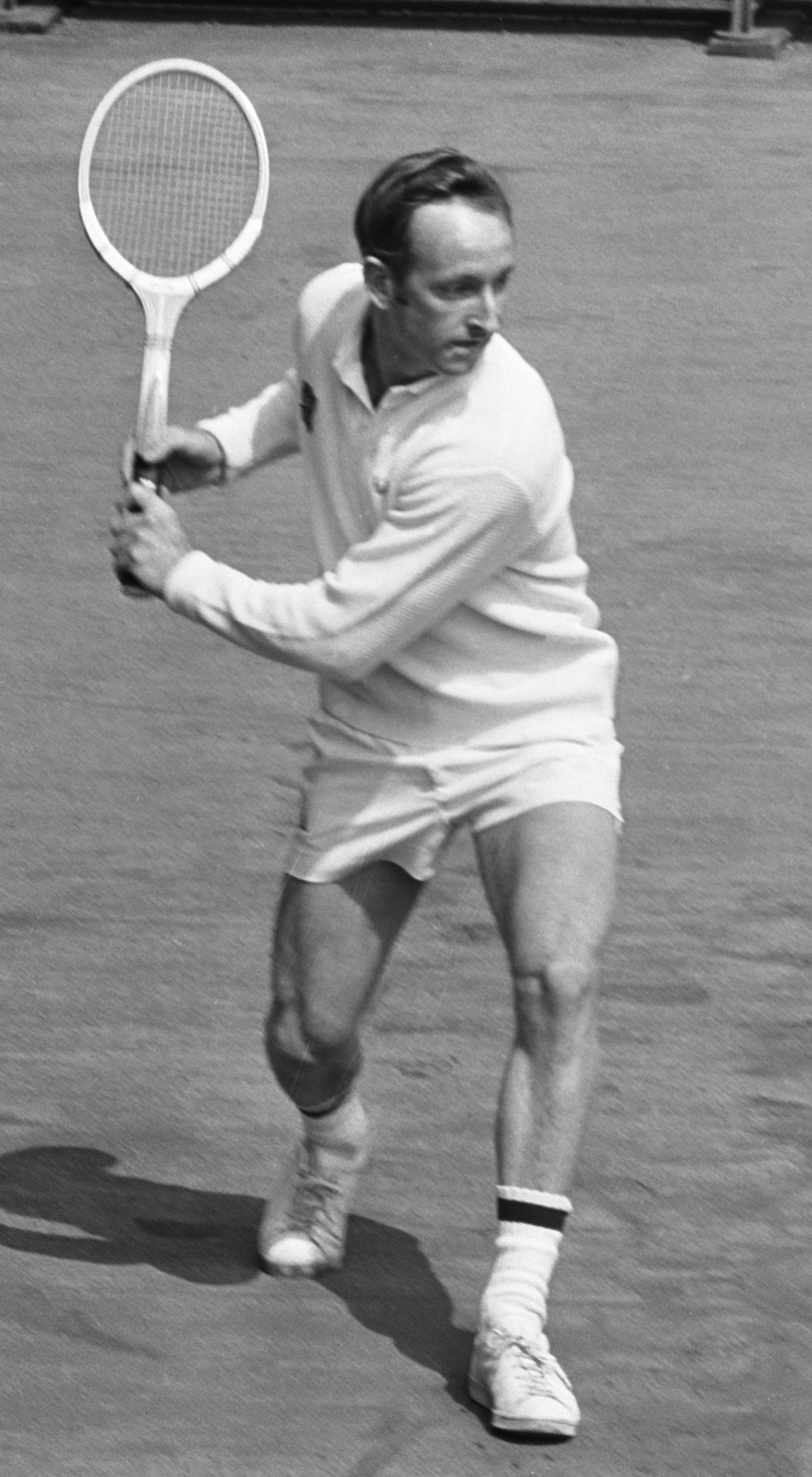
Rod Laver is the only man to complete a Grand Slam more than once in his career, in 1962 as an amateur and in 1969 as a professional.

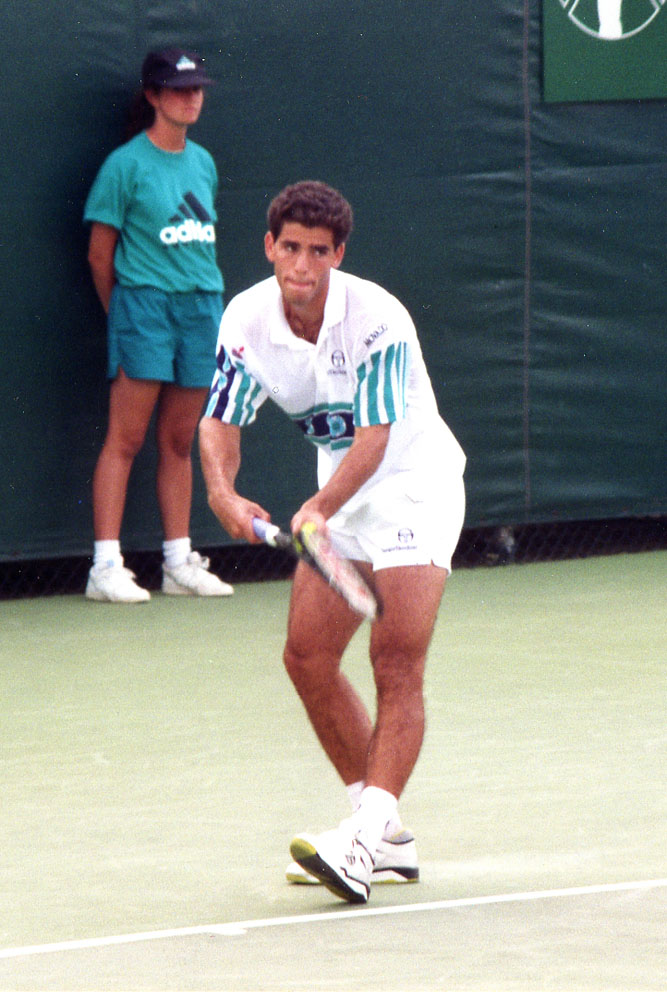
Pete Sampras won 14 major singles titles in his career, including seven titles at Wimbledon.

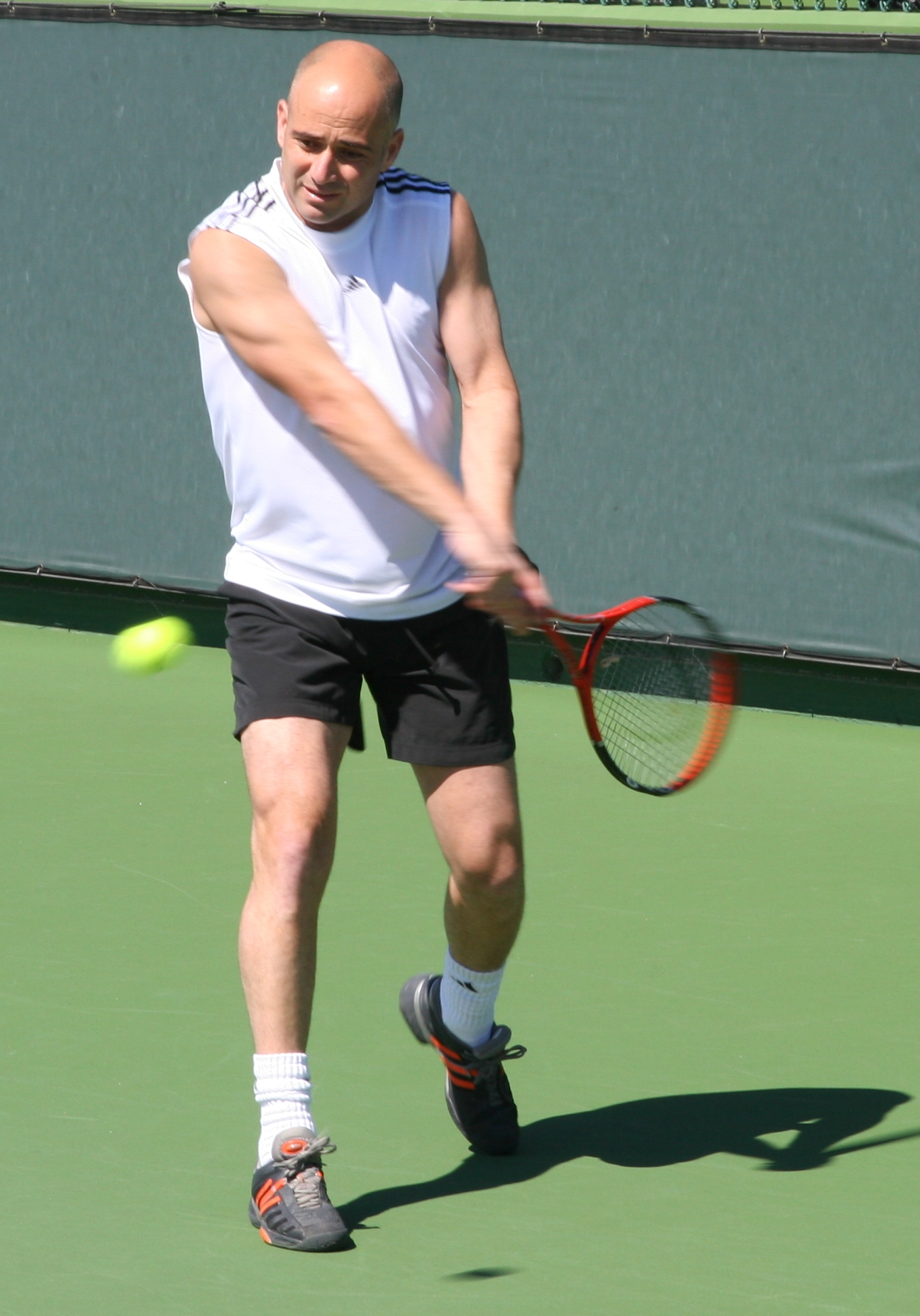
Andre Agassi was the first man to complete a Career Grand Slam across three different surfaces (1999), and the first to win a Career Golden Slam (winning the four majors and an Olympic singles gold medal).

== Champions by year ==
Legend
italic	Open only to specific French club members. See WHCC. (Note: The World Hard Court Championships which was held in Paris on clay courts, has often been considered the true precursor to the French Open.) (1891–1924 French titles are not counted toward major totals)
bold outline	Player won the Grand Slam (four major tournaments in the same year).
§	Tournament change of surface.
Challenge-round format: Wimbledon 1878–1921, US 1884–1911.

Tournament surface
AU	Grass (1905–1987); Hard (1988–present)
FR	Grass (1891); Sand (1892–1907); Clay (1908–present)
WB	Grass
US	Grass (1881–1974); Clay (1975–1977); Hard (1978–present)
Flag icon key
List of national flags

Year	Australian Open	French Open	Wimbledon	US Open
1877	Started in 1905	Started in 1891	(United Kingdom) Spencer Gore (1/1)	Started in 1881
1878	Tournament not created	Tournament not created	(United Kingdom) Frank Hadow (1/1) (Note: Wimbledon from 1878 to 1921 was decided in a Challenge Round match.)	Tournament not created
1879	Tournament not created	Tournament not created	(United Kingdom) John Hartley (1/2)	Tournament not created
1880	Tournament not created	Tournament not created	(United Kingdom) John Hartley (2/2)	Tournament not created
1881	Tournament not created	Tournament not created	(United Kingdom) William Renshaw (1/7)	(United States) Richard Sears (1/7)
1882	Tournament not created	Tournament not created	(United Kingdom) William Renshaw (2/7)	(United States) Richard Sears (2/7)
1883	Tournament not created	Tournament not created	(United Kingdom) William Renshaw (3/7)	(United States) Richard Sears (3/7)
1884	Tournament not created	Tournament not created	(United Kingdom) William Renshaw (4/7)	(United States) Richard Sears (4/7) (Note: US Championship from 1884 to 1911 was decided in a Challenge Round match.)
1885	Tournament not created	Tournament not created	(United Kingdom) William Renshaw (5/7)	(United States) Richard Sears (5/7)
1886	Tournament not created	Tournament not created	(United Kingdom) William Renshaw (6/7)	(United States) Richard Sears (6/7)
1887	Tournament not created	Tournament not created	(United Kingdom) Herbert Lawford (1/1)	(United States) Richard Sears (7/7)
1888	Tournament not created	Tournament not created	(United Kingdom) Ernest Renshaw (1/1)	(United States) Henry Slocum (1/2)
1889	Tournament not created	Tournament not created	(United Kingdom) William Renshaw (7/7)	(United States) Henry Slocum (2/2)
1890	Tournament not created	Tournament not created	(United Kingdom) Willoughby Hamilton (1/1)	(United States) Oliver Campbell (1/3)
1891	Tournament not created	(United Kingdom) H. Briggs (Note: French Championship from 1891 to 1924 was open only to specific club members. Titles are not counted toward major totals.)	(United Kingdom) Wilfred Baddeley (1/3)	(United States) Oliver Campbell (2/3)
1892	Tournament not created	(France) Jean Schopfer §	(United Kingdom) Wilfred Baddeley (2/3)	(United States) Oliver Campbell (3/3)
1893	Tournament not created	(France) Laurent Riboulet	(United Kingdom) Joshua Pim (1/2)	(United States) Robert Wrenn (1/4)
1894	Tournament not created	(France) André Vacherot	(United Kingdom) Joshua Pim (2/2)	(United States) Robert Wrenn (2/4)
1895	Tournament not created	(France) André Vacherot	(United Kingdom) Wilfred Baddeley (3/3)	(United States) Fred Hovey (1/1)
1896	Tournament not created	(France) André Vacherot	(United Kingdom) Harold Mahony (1/1)	(United States) Robert Wrenn (3/4)
1897	Tournament not created	(France) Paul Aymé	(United Kingdom) Reginald Doherty (1/4)	(United States) Robert Wrenn (4/4)
1898	Tournament not created	(France) Paul Aymé	(United Kingdom) Reginald Doherty (2/4)	(United States) Malcolm Whitman (1/3)
1899	Tournament not created	(France) Paul Aymé	(United Kingdom) Reginald Doherty (3/4)	(United States) Malcolm Whitman (2/3)
1900	Tournament not created	(France) Paul Aymé	(United Kingdom) Reginald Doherty (4/4)	(United States) Malcolm Whitman (3/3)
1901	Tournament not created	(France) André Vacherot	(United Kingdom) Arthur Gore (1/3)	(United States) William Larned (1/7)
1902	Tournament not created	(France) Michel Vacherot	(United Kingdom) Laurence Doherty (1/6)	(United States) William Larned (2/7)
1903	Tournament not created	(France) Max Decugis	(United Kingdom) Laurence Doherty (2/6)	(United Kingdom) Laurence Doherty (3/6)
1904	Tournament not created	(France) Max Decugis	(United Kingdom) Laurence Doherty (4/6)	(United States) Holcombe Ward (1/1)
1905	(Australia) Rodney Heath (1/2)	(France) Maurice Germot	(United Kingdom) Laurence Doherty (5/6)	(United States) Beals Wright (1/1)
1906	(New Zealand) Anthony Wilding (1/6)	(France) Maurice Germot	(United Kingdom) Laurence Doherty (6/6)	(United States) William Clothier (1/1)
1907	(Australia) Horace Rice (1/1)	(France) Max Decugis	(Australia) Norman Brookes (1/3)	(United States) William Larned (3/7)
1908	(United States) Fred Alexander (1/1)	(France) Max Decugis §	(United Kingdom) Arthur Gore (2/3)	(United States) William Larned (4/7)
1909	(New Zealand) Anthony Wilding (2/6)	(France) Max Decugis	(United Kingdom) Arthur Gore (3/3)	(United States) William Larned (5/7)
1910	(Australia) Rodney Heath (2/2)	(France) Maurice Germot	(New Zealand) Anthony Wilding (3/6)	(United States) William Larned (6/7)
1911	(Australia) Norman Brookes (2/3)	(France) André Gobert	(New Zealand) Anthony Wilding (4/6)	(United States) William Larned (7/7)
1912	(United Kingdom) James Cecil Parke (1/1)	(France) Max Decugis	(New Zealand) Anthony Wilding (5/6)	(United States) Maurice McLoughlin (1/2)
1913	(Australia) Ernie Parker (1/1)	(France) Max Decugis	(New Zealand) Anthony Wilding (6/6)	(United States) Maurice McLoughlin (2/2)
1914	(Australia) Arthur O'Hara Wood (1/1)	(France) Max Decugis	(Australia) Norman Brookes (3/3)	(United States) R. Norris Williams (1/2)
1915	(United Kingdom) Gordon Lowe (1/1)	World War I	World War I	(United States) Bill Johnston (1/3)
1916	World War I	World War I	World War I	(United States) R. Norris Williams (2/2)
1917	World War I	World War I	World War I	(United States) Robert Lindley Murray (1/2)
1918	World War I	World War I	World War I	(United States) Robert Lindley Murray (2/2)
1919	(United Kingdom) Algernon Kingscote (1/1) (Note: 1919 Australasian Championships was held in January 1920, before the 1920 Australasian Championships.)	World War I	(Australia) Gerald Patterson (1/3)	(United States) Bill Johnston (2/3)
1920	(Australia) Pat O'Hara Wood (1/2)	(France) André Gobert	(United States) Bill Tilden (1/10)	(United States) Bill Tilden (2/10)
1921	(Australia) Rhys Gemmell (1/1)	(France) Jean Samazeuilh	(United States) Bill Tilden (3/10)	(United States) Bill Tilden (4/10)
1922	(Australia) James Anderson (1/3)	(France) Henri Cochet	(Australia) Gerald Patterson (2/3)	(United States) Bill Tilden (5/10)
1923	(Australia) Pat O'Hara Wood (2/2) (Note: 1923 Australasian Championships was held in August, after Wimbledon and before the US National Championships.)	(France) François Blanchy	(United States) Bill Johnston (3/3)	(United States) Bill Tilden (6/10)
1924	(Australia) James Anderson (2/3)	(France) Jean Borotra	(France) Jean Borotra (1/4)	(United States) Bill Tilden (7/10)
1925	(Australia) James Anderson (3/3)	(France) René Lacoste (1/7) (Note: The French Championships opened itself to international competitors and renamed as Championnats Internationaux de France (de tennis). See WHCC.)	(France) René Lacoste (2/7)	(United States) Bill Tilden (8/10)
1926	(Australia) John Hawkes (1/1)	(France) Henri Cochet (1/7)	(France) Jean Borotra (2/4)	(France) René Lacoste (3/7)
1927	(Australia) Gerald Patterson (3/3) (Note: Australasian Championships was renamed to Australian Championships.)	(France) René Lacoste (4/7)	(France) Henri Cochet (2/7)	(France) René Lacoste (5/7)
1928	(France) Jean Borotra (3/4)	(France) Henri Cochet (3/7)	(France) René Lacoste (6/7)	(France) Henri Cochet (4/7)
1929	(United Kingdom) John Colin Gregory (1/1)	(France) René Lacoste (7/7)	(France) Henri Cochet (5/7)	(United States) Bill Tilden (9/10)
1930	(Australia) Edgar Moon (1/1)	(France) Henri Cochet (6/7)	(United States) Bill Tilden (10/10)	(United States) John Doeg (1/1)
1931	(Australia) Jack Crawford (1/6)	(France) Jean Borotra (4/4)	(United States) Sidney Wood (1/1)	(United States) Ellsworth Vines (1/3)
1932	(Australia) Jack Crawford (2/6)	(France) Henri Cochet (7/7)	(United States) Ellsworth Vines (2/3)	(United States) Ellsworth Vines (3/3)
1933	(Australia) Jack Crawford (3/6)	(Australia) Jack Crawford (4/6)	(Australia) Jack Crawford (5/6)	(United Kingdom) Fred Perry (1/8)
1934	(United Kingdom) Fred Perry (2/8)	(Germany) Gottfried von Cramm (1/2)	(United Kingdom) Fred Perry (3/8)	(United Kingdom) Fred Perry (4/8)
1935	(Australia) Jack Crawford (6/6)	(United Kingdom) Fred Perry (5/8)	(United Kingdom) Fred Perry (6/8)	(United States) Wilmer Allison (1/1)
1936	(Australia) Adrian Quist (1/3)	(Germany) Gottfried von Cramm (2/2)	(United Kingdom) Fred Perry (7/8)	(United Kingdom) Fred Perry (8/8)
1937	(Australia) Vivian McGrath (1/1)	(Germany) Henner Henkel (1/1)	(United States) Don Budge (1/6)	(United States) Don Budge (2/6)
1938	(United States) Don Budge (3/6)	(United States) Don Budge (4/6)	(United States) Don Budge (5/6)	(United States) Don Budge (6/6)
1939	(Australia) John Bromwich (1/2)	(United States) Don McNeill (1/2)	(United States) Bobby Riggs (1/3)	(United States) Bobby Riggs (2/3)
1940	(Australia) Adrian Quist (2/3)	Tournament canceled	World War II	(United States) Don McNeill (2/2)
1941	World War II	Bernard Destremau (unrecognized)	World War II	(United States) Bobby Riggs (3/3)
1942	World War II	Held under German occupation (Note: French Championships held between 1941 and 1945 are not recognized by the tournament organizer. See Tournoi de France.)	World War II	(United States) Ted Schroeder (1/2)
1943	World War II	Held under German occupation	World War II	(United States) Joseph Hunt (1/1)
1944	World War II	Held under German occupation	World War II	(United States) Frank Parker (1/4)
1945	World War II	Yvon Petra (unrecognized)	World War II	(United States) Frank Parker (2/4)
1946	(Australia) John Bromwich (2/2)	(France) Marcel Bernard (1/1) (Note: French Open was held in July, after Wimbledon from 1946 to 1947 due to the effects in the aftermath of World War II.)	(France) Yvon Petra (1/1)	(United States) Jack Kramer (1/3)
1947	(Australia) Dinny Pails (1/1)	(Hungary) József Asbóth (1/1)	(United States) Jack Kramer (2/3)	(United States) Jack Kramer (3/3)
1948	(Australia) Adrian Quist (3/3)	(United States) Frank Parker (3/4)	(United States) Bob Falkenburg (1/1)	(United States) Pancho Gonzales (1/2)
1949	(Australia) Frank Sedgman (1/5)	(United States) Frank Parker (4/4)	(United States) Ted Schroeder (2/2)	(United States) Pancho Gonzales (2/2)
1950	(Australia) Frank Sedgman (2/5)	(United States) Budge Patty (1/2)	(United States) Budge Patty (2/2)	(United States) Arthur Larsen (1/1)
1951	(United States) Dick Savitt (1/2)	(Egypt) Jaroslav Drobný (1/3)	(United States) Dick Savitt (2/2)	(Australia) Frank Sedgman (3/5)
1952	(Australia) Ken McGregor (1/1)	(Egypt) Jaroslav Drobný (2/3)	(Australia) Frank Sedgman (4/5)	(Australia) Frank Sedgman (5/5)
1953	(Australia) Ken Rosewall (1/8)	(Australia) Ken Rosewall (2/8)	(United States) Vic Seixas (1/2)	(United States) Tony Trabert (1/5)
1954	(Australia) Mervyn Rose (1/2)	(United States) Tony Trabert (2/5)	(Egypt) Jaroslav Drobný (3/3)	(United States) Vic Seixas (2/2)
1955	(Australia) Ken Rosewall (3/8)	(United States) Tony Trabert (3/5)	(United States) Tony Trabert (4/5)	(United States) Tony Trabert (5/5)
1956	(Australia) Lew Hoad (1/4)	(Australia) Lew Hoad (2/4)	(Australia) Lew Hoad (3/4)	(Australia) Ken Rosewall (4/8)
1957	(Australia) Ashley Cooper (1/4)	(Sweden) Sven Davidson (1/1)	(Australia) Lew Hoad (4/4)	(Australia) Mal Anderson (1/1)
1958	(Australia) Ashley Cooper (2/4)	(Australia) Mervyn Rose (2/2)	(Australia) Ashley Cooper (3/4)	(Australia) Ashley Cooper (4/4)
1959	(United States) Alex Olmedo (1/2)	(Italy) Nicola Pietrangeli (1/2)	(United States) Alex Olmedo (2/2)	(Australia) Neale Fraser (1/3)
1960	(Australia) Rod Laver (1/11)	(Italy) Nicola Pietrangeli (2/2)	(Australia) Neale Fraser (2/3)	(Australia) Neale Fraser (3/3)
1961	(Australia) Roy Emerson (1/12)	(Spain) Manuel Santana (1/4)	(Australia) Rod Laver (2/11)	(Australia) Roy Emerson (2/12)
1962	(Australia) Rod Laver (3/11)	(Australia) Rod Laver (4/11)	(Australia) Rod Laver (5/11)	(Australia) Rod Laver (6/11)
1963	(Australia) Roy Emerson (3/12)	(Australia) Roy Emerson (4/12)	(United States) Chuck McKinley (1/1)	(Mexico) Rafael Osuna (1/1)
1964	(Australia) Roy Emerson (5/12)	(Spain) Manuel Santana (2/4)	(Australia) Roy Emerson (6/12)	(Australia) Roy Emerson (7/12)
1965	(Australia) Roy Emerson (8/12)	(Australia) Fred Stolle (1/2)	(Australia) Roy Emerson (9/12)	(Spain) Manuel Santana (3/4)
1966	(Australia) Roy Emerson (10/12)	(Australia) Tony Roche (1/1)	(Spain) Manuel Santana (4/4)	(Australia) Fred Stolle (2/2)
1967	(Australia) Roy Emerson (11/12)	(Australia) Roy Emerson (12/12)	(Australia) John Newcombe (1/7)	(Australia) John Newcombe (2/7)
1968	(Australia) Bill Bowrey (1/1)	↓ Open Era ↓		
1968	↓ Open Era ↓	(Australia) Ken Rosewall (5/8)	(Australia) Rod Laver (7/11)	(United States) Arthur Ashe (1/3)
1969	(Australia) Rod Laver (8/11)	(Australia) Rod Laver (9/11)	(Australia) Rod Laver (10/11)	(Australia) Rod Laver (11/11)
1970	(United States) Arthur Ashe (2/3)	(Czechoslovakia) Jan Kodeš (1/3)	(Australia) John Newcombe (3/7)	(Australia) Ken Rosewall (6/8)
1971	(Australia) Ken Rosewall (7/8)	(Czechoslovakia) Jan Kodeš (2/3)	(Australia) John Newcombe (4/7)	(United States) Stan Smith (1/2)
1972	(Australia) Ken Rosewall (8/8)	(Spain) Andrés Gimeno (1/1)	(United States) Stan Smith (2/2)	(Romania) Ilie Năstase (1/2)
1973	(Australia) John Newcombe (5/7)	(Romania) Ilie Năstase (2/2)	(Czechoslovakia) Jan Kodeš (3/3)	(Australia) John Newcombe (6/7)
1974	(United States) Jimmy Connors (1/8)	(Sweden) Björn Borg (1/11)	(United States) Jimmy Connors (2/8)	(United States) Jimmy Connors (3/8)
1975	(Australia) John Newcombe (7/7)	(Sweden) Björn Borg (2/11)	(United States) Arthur Ashe (3/3)	(Spain) Manuel Orantes (1/1) §
1976	(Australia) Mark Edmondson (1/1)	(Italy) Adriano Panatta (1/1)	(Sweden) Björn Borg (3/11)	(United States) Jimmy Connors (4/8)
1977	(United States) Roscoe Tanner (1/1) ^{(Jan)}	(Argentina) Guillermo Vilas (1/4)	(Sweden) Björn Borg (4/11)	(Argentina) Guillermo Vilas (2/4)
1977	(United States) Vitas Gerulaitis (1/1) ^{(Dec)} (Note: Australian Open was held in December, after the US Open from 1977 to 1985.)	(Argentina) Guillermo Vilas (1/4)	(Sweden) Björn Borg (4/11)	(Argentina) Guillermo Vilas (2/4)
1978	(Argentina) Guillermo Vilas (3/4) ^{(Dec)}	(Sweden) Björn Borg (5/11)	(Sweden) Björn Borg (6/11)	(United States) Jimmy Connors (5/8) §
1979	(Argentina) Guillermo Vilas (4/4) ^{(Dec)}	(Sweden) Björn Borg (7/11)	(Sweden) Björn Borg (8/11)	(United States) John McEnroe (1/7)
1980	(United States) Brian Teacher (1/1) ^{(Dec)}	(Sweden) Björn Borg (9/11)	(Sweden) Björn Borg (10/11)	(United States) John McEnroe (2/7)
1981	(South Africa) Johan Kriek (1/2) ^{(Dec)}	(Sweden) Björn Borg (11/11)	(United States) John McEnroe (3/7)	(United States) John McEnroe (4/7)
1982	(United States) (Note: Johan Kriek became a naturalised US citizen after originally representing South Africa.) Johan Kriek (2/2) ^{(Dec)}	(Sweden) Mats Wilander (1/7)	(United States) Jimmy Connors (6/8)	(United States) Jimmy Connors (7/8)
1983	(Sweden) Mats Wilander (2/7) ^{(Dec)}	(France) Yannick Noah (1/1)	(United States) John McEnroe (5/7)	(United States) Jimmy Connors (8/8)
1984	(Sweden) Mats Wilander (3/7) ^{(Dec)}	(Czechoslovakia) Ivan Lendl (1/8)	(United States) John McEnroe (6/7)	(United States) John McEnroe (7/7)
1985	(Sweden) Stefan Edberg (1/6) ^{(Dec)}	(Sweden) Mats Wilander (4/7)	(West Germany) Boris Becker (1/6)	(Czechoslovakia) Ivan Lendl (2/8)
1986	Tournament date changed	(Czechoslovakia) Ivan Lendl (3/8)	(West Germany) Boris Becker (2/6)	(Czechoslovakia) Ivan Lendl (4/8)
1987	(Sweden) Stefan Edberg (2/6)	(Czechoslovakia) Ivan Lendl (5/8)	(Australia) Pat Cash (1/1)	(Czechoslovakia) Ivan Lendl (6/8)
1988	(Sweden) Mats Wilander (5/7) §	(Sweden) Mats Wilander (6/7)	(Sweden) Stefan Edberg (3/6)	(Sweden) Mats Wilander (7/7)
1989	(Czechoslovakia) Ivan Lendl (7/8)	(United States) Michael Chang (1/1)	(West Germany) Boris Becker (3/6)	(West Germany) Boris Becker (4/6)
1990	(Czechoslovakia) Ivan Lendl (8/8)	(Ecuador) Andrés Gómez (1/1)	(Sweden) Stefan Edberg (4/6)	(United States) Pete Sampras (1/14)
1991	(Germany) Boris Becker (5/6)	(United States) Jim Courier (1/4)	(Germany) Michael Stich (1/1)	(Sweden) Stefan Edberg (5/6)
1992	(United States) Jim Courier (2/4)	(United States) Jim Courier (3/4)	(United States) Andre Agassi (1/8)	(Sweden) Stefan Edberg (6/6)
1993	(United States) Jim Courier (4/4)	(Spain) Sergi Bruguera (1/2)	(United States) Pete Sampras (2/14)	(United States) Pete Sampras (3/14)
1994	(United States) Pete Sampras (4/14)	(Spain) Sergi Bruguera (2/2)	(United States) Pete Sampras (5/14)	(United States) Andre Agassi (2/8)
1995	(United States) Andre Agassi (3/8)	(Austria) Thomas Muster (1/1)	(United States) Pete Sampras (6/14)	(United States) Pete Sampras (7/14)
1996	(Germany) Boris Becker (6/6)	(Russia) Yevgeny Kafelnikov (1/2)	(Netherlands) Richard Krajicek (1/1)	(United States) Pete Sampras (8/14)
1997	(United States) Pete Sampras (9/14)	(Brazil) Gustavo Kuerten (1/3)	(United States) Pete Sampras (10/14)	(Australia) Patrick Rafter (1/2)
1998	(Czech Republic) Petr Korda (1/1)	(Spain) Carlos Moyá (1/1)	(United States) Pete Sampras (11/14)	(Australia) Patrick Rafter (2/2)
1999	(Russia) Yevgeny Kafelnikov (2/2)	(United States) Andre Agassi (4/8)	(United States) Pete Sampras (12/14)	(United States) Andre Agassi (5/8)
2000	(United States) Andre Agassi (6/8)	(Brazil) Gustavo Kuerten (2/3)	(United States) Pete Sampras (13/14)	(Russia) Marat Safin (1/2)
2001	(United States) Andre Agassi (7/8)	(Brazil) Gustavo Kuerten (3/3)	(Croatia) Goran Ivanišević (1/1)	(Australia) Lleyton Hewitt (1/2)
2002	(Sweden) Thomas Johansson (1/1)	(Spain) Albert Costa (1/1)	(Australia) Lleyton Hewitt (2/2)	(United States) Pete Sampras (14/14)
2003	(United States) Andre Agassi (8/8)	(Spain) Juan Carlos Ferrero (1/1)	(Switzerland) Roger Federer (1/20)	(United States) Andy Roddick (1/1)
2004	(Switzerland) Roger Federer (2/20)	(Argentina) Gastón Gaudio (1/1)	(Switzerland) Roger Federer (3/20)	(Switzerland) Roger Federer (4/20)
2005	(Russia) Marat Safin (2/2)	(Spain) Rafael Nadal (1/22)	(Switzerland) Roger Federer (5/20)	(Switzerland) Roger Federer (6/20)
2006	(Switzerland) Roger Federer (7/20)	(Spain) Rafael Nadal (2/22)	(Switzerland) Roger Federer (8/20)	(Switzerland) Roger Federer (9/20)
2007	(Switzerland) Roger Federer (10/20)	(Spain) Rafael Nadal (3/22)	(Switzerland) Roger Federer (11/20)	(Switzerland) Roger Federer (12/20)
2008	(Serbia) Novak Djokovic (1/24)	(Spain) Rafael Nadal (4/22)	(Spain) Rafael Nadal (5/22)	(Switzerland) Roger Federer (13/20)
2009	(Spain) Rafael Nadal (6/22)	(Switzerland) Roger Federer (14/20)	(Switzerland) Roger Federer (15/20)	(Argentina) Juan Martín del Potro (1/1)
2010	(Switzerland) Roger Federer (16/20)	(Spain) Rafael Nadal (7/22)	(Spain) Rafael Nadal (8/22)	(Spain) Rafael Nadal (9/22)
2011	(Serbia) Novak Djokovic (2/24)	(Spain) Rafael Nadal (10/22)	(Serbia) Novak Djokovic (3/24)	(Serbia) Novak Djokovic (4/24)
2012	(Serbia) Novak Djokovic (5/24)	(Spain) Rafael Nadal (11/22)	(Switzerland) Roger Federer (17/20)	(United Kingdom) Andy Murray (1/3)
2013	(Serbia) Novak Djokovic (6/24)	(Spain) Rafael Nadal (12/22)	(United Kingdom) Andy Murray (2/3)	(Spain) Rafael Nadal (13/22)
2014	(Switzerland) Stan Wawrinka (1/3)	(Spain) Rafael Nadal (14/22)	(Serbia) Novak Djokovic (7/24)	(Croatia) Marin Čilić (1/1)
2015	(Serbia) Novak Djokovic (8/24)	(Switzerland) Stan Wawrinka (2/3)	(Serbia) Novak Djokovic (9/24)	(Serbia) Novak Djokovic (10/24)
2016	(Serbia) Novak Djokovic (11/24)	(Serbia) Novak Djokovic (12/24)	(United Kingdom) Andy Murray (3/3)	(Switzerland) Stan Wawrinka (3/3)
2017	(Switzerland) Roger Federer (18/20)	(Spain) Rafael Nadal (15/22)	(Switzerland) Roger Federer (19/20)	(Spain) Rafael Nadal (16/22)
2018	(Switzerland) Roger Federer (20/20)	(Spain) Rafael Nadal (17/22)	(Serbia) Novak Djokovic (13/24)	(Serbia) Novak Djokovic (14/24)
2019	(Serbia) Novak Djokovic (15/24)	(Spain) Rafael Nadal (18/22)	(Serbia) Novak Djokovic (16/24)	(Spain) Rafael Nadal (19/22)
2020	(Serbia) Novak Djokovic (17/24)	(Spain) Rafael Nadal (20/22) (Note: 2020 French Open was held in September, after the US Open, due to the COVID-19 pandemic.)	Cancelled (COVID-19 pandemic)	(Austria) Dominic Thiem (1/1)
2021	(Serbia) Novak Djokovic (18/24)	(Serbia) Novak Djokovic (19/24)	(Serbia) Novak Djokovic (20/24)	(Russia) Daniil Medvedev (1/1)
2022	(Spain) Rafael Nadal (21/22)	(Spain) Rafael Nadal (22/22)	(Serbia) Novak Djokovic (21/24) (Note: This edition of Wimbledon was stripped of its ranked points due to the tournament banning Russian and Belarusian players.)	(Spain) Carlos Alcaraz (1/7)
2023	(Serbia) Novak Djokovic (22/24)	(Serbia) Novak Djokovic (23/24)	(Spain) Carlos Alcaraz (2/7)	(Serbia) Novak Djokovic (24/24)
2024	(Italy) Jannik Sinner (1/5)	(Spain) Carlos Alcaraz (3/7)	(Spain) Carlos Alcaraz (4/7)	(Italy) Jannik Sinner (2/5)
2025	(Italy) Jannik Sinner (3/5)	(Spain) Carlos Alcaraz (5/7)	(Italy) Jannik Sinner (4/5)	(Spain) Carlos Alcaraz (6/7)
2026	(Spain) Carlos Alcaraz (7/7)	(Germany) Alexander Zverev (1/2)	(Italy) Jannik Sinner (5/5)	(Germany) Alexander Zverev (2/2)
Year	Australian Open	French Open	Wimbledon	US Open

== Champions list ==
AO Australian Open	WIM Wimbledon
FO French Open	USO US Open

Tournament record and active players indicated in bold.

Titles	Player	AO	FO	WIM	USO	Years
24	(Serbia) **Novak Djokovic**	**10**	3	7	4	2008–2023
22	(Spain) Rafael Nadal	2	**14**	2	4	2005–2022
20	(Switzerland) Roger Federer	6	1	**8**	5	2003–2018
14	(United States) Pete Sampras	2	0	7	5	1990–2002
12	(Australia) Roy Emerson	6	2	2	2	1961–1967
11	(Australia) Rod Laver	3	2	4	2	1960–1969
11	(Sweden) Björn Borg	0	6	5	0	1974–1981
10	(United States) Bill Tilden	0	0	3	**7**	1920–1930
8	(United Kingdom) Fred Perry	1	1	3	3	1933–1936
8	(Australia) Ken Rosewall	4	2	0	2	1953–1972
8	(United States) Jimmy Connors	1	0	2	5	1974–1983
8	(Czechoslovakia) Ivan Lendl	2	3	0	3	1984–1990
8	(United States) Andre Agassi	4	1	1	2	1992–2003
Top 10

- 154 champions in 495 events as of the 2026 US Open.
  - Amateur Era – 98 champions in 261 events.
  - Open Era – 59 champions in 234 events.
  - (Australia) Australians Ken Rosewall, Rod Laver and John Newcombe are the only players to have become champions in both the Amateur Era and in the Open Era.
- Youngest and oldest champions
  - (United States) Michael Chang – 17 years, 3 months, at 1989 French Open.
  - (United Kingdom) Arthur Gore – 41 years, 6 months, at 1909 Wimbledon. (One match)
  - (Australia) Ken Rosewall – 37 years, 2 months, at 1972 Australian Open. (Open Era)

== Grand Slam achievements ==
These are players who achieved some form of a tennis Grand Slam. They include a Grand Slam, non-calendar year Grand Slam, Career Grand Slam, Career Golden Slam, and Career Super Slam. No male player has won a single season Golden Slam. The tennis Open Era began in 1968, after the Australian Open and before the French Open.

H Hard court	C Clay court	G Grass court	Cp Carpet court

=== Grand Slam ===
Players who won all four major titles in a calendar year.

Player	Australian Open	French Open	Wimbledon	US Open
(United States) Don Budge	1938_{G}	1938_{C}	1938_{G}	1938_{G}
(Australia) Rod Laver	1962_{G}	1962_{C}	1962_{G}	1962_{G}
(Australia) Rod Laver (2)	1969_{G}	1969_{C}	1969_{G}	1969_{G}

=== Non-calendar year Grand Slam ===
Players who won all four major titles consecutively (not in a calendar year).

- The event at which the non-calendar year Grand Slam was completed indicated in **bold**.

Player	Australian Open	French Open	Wimbledon	US Open
(Serbia) Novak Djokovic	2016_{H}	**2016**_{C}	2015_{G}	2015_{H}

=== Career Grand Slam ===
Players who won all four major titles over the course of their careers.

- The event at which the Career Grand Slam was completed indicated in **bold**.

Player	Australian Open	French Open	Wimbledon	US Open
(United Kingdom) Fred Perry	1934_{G}	**1935**_{C}	1934_{G}	1933_{G}
(United States) Don Budge	1938_{G}	**1938**_{C}	1937_{G}	1937_{G}
(Australia) Rod Laver	1960_{G}	1962_{C}	1961_{G}	**1962**_{G}
(Australia) Roy Emerson	1961_{G}	1963_{C}	**1964**_{G}	1961_{G}
(Australia) Roy Emerson (2)	1963_{G}	**1967**_{C}	1965_{G}	1964_{G}
(Australia) Rod Laver (2)	1962_{G}	1969_{C}	1962_{G}	**1969**_{G}
(United States) Andre Agassi	1995_{H}	**1999**_{C}	1992_{G}	1994_{H}
(Switzerland) Roger Federer	2004_{H}	**2009**_{C}	2003_{G}	2004_{H}
(Spain) Rafael Nadal	2009_{H}	2005_{C}	2008_{G}	**2010**_{H}
(Serbia) Novak Djokovic	2008_{H}	**2016**_{C}	2011_{G}	2011_{H}
(Serbia) Novak Djokovic (2)	2011_{H}	**2021**_{C}	2014_{G}	2015_{H}
(Spain) Rafael Nadal (2)	**2022**_{H}	2006_{C}	2010_{G}	2013_{H}
(Serbia) Novak Djokovic (3)	2012_{H}	**2023**_{C}	2015_{G}	2018_{H}
(Spain) Carlos Alcaraz	**2026**_{H}	2024_{C}	2023_{G}	2022_{H}

=== Career Golden Slam ===
Players who won all four major titles and the Olympic gold medal over the course of their careers. (Note: Tennis was not an Olympic sport between 1928 and 1984.)

- The event at which the Career Golden Slam was completed indicated in **bold**.

Player	Australian Open	French Open	Wimbledon	US Open	Olympics
(United States) Andre Agassi	1995_{H}	**1999**_{C}	1992_{G}	1994_{H}	1996_{H}
(Spain) Rafael Nadal	2009_{H}	2005_{C}	2008_{G}	**2010**_{H}	2008_{H}
(Serbia) Novak Djokovic	2008_{H}	2016_{C}	2011_{G}	2011_{H}	**2024**_{C}

=== Career Super Slam ===
Players who won all four major titles, the Olympic gold medal and the Tour Finals over the course of their careers. (Note: The Year-end Championships started in 1970 but the achievement has only been possible since tennis was reinstated as an Olympic sport in 1988.)

- The event at which the Career Super Slam was completed indicated in **bold**.

Player	Australian Open	French Open	Wimbledon	US Open	Olympics	Year-end
(United States) Andre Agassi	1995_{H}	**1999**_{C}	1992_{G}	1994_{H}	1996_{H}	1990_{Cp}
(Serbia) Novak Djokovic	2008_{H}	2016_{C}	2011_{G}	2011_{H}	**2024**_{C}	2008_{H}

=== Career Surface Slam ===
Players who won major titles on clay, grass and hard courts over the course of their careers. (Note: Tennis majors only had two surfaces (clay and grass) until 1978.)

- The event at which the Career Surface Slam was completed indicated in **bold**

Player	Clay court major	Hard court major	Grass court major
(United States) Jimmy Connors	1976 US Open	**1978 US Open**	1974 Australian Open
(Sweden) Mats Wilander	1982 French Open	**1988 Australian Open**	1983 Australian Open
(Sweden) Mats Wilander (2)	1985 French Open	**1988 US Open**	1984 Australian Open
(United States) Andre Agassi	**1999 French Open**	1994 US Open	1992 Wimbledon Championships
(Spain) Rafael Nadal	2005 French Open	**2009 Australian Open**	2008 Wimbledon Championships
(Switzerland) Roger Federer	**2009 French Open**	2004 Australian Open	2003 Wimbledon Championships
(Spain) Rafael Nadal (2)	2006 French Open	**2010 US Open**	2010 Wimbledon Championships
(Serbia) Novak Djokovic	**2016 French Open**	2008 Australian Open	2011 Wimbledon Championships
(Serbia) Novak Djokovic (2)	**2021 French Open**	2011 Australian Open	2014 Wimbledon Championships
(Serbia) Novak Djokovic (3)	**2023 French Open**	2011 US Open	2015 Wimbledon Championships
(Spain) Carlos Alcaraz	**2024 French Open**	2022 US Open	2023 Wimbledon Championships
(Spain) Carlos Alcaraz (2)	2025 French Open	**2025 US Open**	2024 Wimbledon Championships

== Multiple titles in a season ==
♠ Player won the four major tournaments in the same year.

=== Three titles ===
★ Surface Slam (major titles on three different surfaces in the same season). (Note: The U.S. and Australian Opens have been played on hardcourts since 1978 and 1988 respectively.)

Australian—French—Wimbledon
1933	(Australia) Jack Crawford
1938^{♠}	(United States) Don Budge
1956	(Australia) Lew Hoad
1962^{♠}	(Australia) Rod Laver
↓ Open Era ↓
1969^{♠}	(Australia) Rod Laver
2021^{★}	(Serbia) Novak Djokovic

| class="col-break " style=" padding-left: 1em;" |

Australian—French—U.S.
1938^{♠}	(United States) Don Budge
1962^{♠}	(Australia) Rod Laver
↓ Open Era ↓
1969^{♠}	(Australia) Rod Laver
1988	(Sweden) Mats Wilander
2023	(Serbia) Novak Djokovic

Australian—Wimbledon—U.S.
1934	(United Kingdom) Fred Perry
1938^{♠}	(United States) Don Budge
1958	(Australia) Ashley Cooper
1962^{♠}	(Australia) Rod Laver
1964	(Australia) Roy Emerson
↓ Open Era ↓
1969^{♠}	(Australia) Rod Laver
1974	(United States) Jimmy Connors
2004	(Switzerland) Roger Federer
2006	(Switzerland) Roger Federer
2007	(Switzerland) Roger Federer
2011	(Serbia) Novak Djokovic
2015	(Serbia) Novak Djokovic

French—Wimbledon—U.S.
1938^{♠}	(United States) Don Budge
1955	(United States) Tony Trabert
1962^{♠}	(Australia) Rod Laver
↓ Open Era ↓
1969^{♠}	(Australia) Rod Laver
2010^{★}	(Spain) Rafael Nadal

=== Two titles ===
● Three-Quarter Slam (Three major titles in the same season).
‡ Channel Slam (French and Wimbledon title double).

Australian—French
1933^{●}	(Australia) Jack Crawford
1938^{♠}	(United States) Don Budge
1953	(Australia) Ken Rosewall
1956^{●}	(Australia) Lew Hoad
1962^{♠}	(Australia) Rod Laver
1963	(Australia) Roy Emerson
1964^{●}	(Australia) Roy Emerson
1967	(Australia) Roy Emerson
Open Era
1969^{♠}	(Australia) Rod Laver
1988^{●}	(Sweden) Mats Wilander
1992	(United States) Jim Courier
2016	(Serbia) Novak Djokovic
2021^{●}	(Serbia) Novak Djokovic
2022	(Spain) Rafael Nadal
2023^{●}	(Serbia) Novak Djokovic

| class="col-break " style=" padding-left: 1em;" |

Australian—Wimbledon
1933^{●}	(Australia) Jack Crawford
1934^{●}	(United Kingdom) Fred Perry
1938^{♠}	(United States) Don Budge
1951	(United States) Dick Savitt
1956^{●}	(Australia) Lew Hoad
1958^{●}	(Australia) Ashley Cooper
1959	(United States) Alex Olmedo
1962^{♠}	(Australia) Rod Laver
1965	(Australia) Roy Emerson
Open Era
1969^{♠}	(Australia) Rod Laver
1974^{●}	(United States) Jimmy Connors
1994	(United States) Pete Sampras
1997	(United States) Pete Sampras
2004^{●}	(Switzerland) Roger Federer
2006^{●}	(Switzerland) Roger Federer
2007^{●}	(Switzerland) Roger Federer
2011^{●}	(Serbia) Novak Djokovic
2015^{●}	(Serbia) Novak Djokovic
2017	(Switzerland) Roger Federer
2019	(Serbia) Novak Djokovic
2021^{●}	(Serbia) Novak Djokovic
2025	(Italy) Jannik Sinner

Australian—U.S.
1934^{●}	(United Kingdom) Fred Perry
1938^{♠}	(United States) Don Budge
1958^{●}	(Australia) Ashley Cooper
1961	(Australia) Roy Emerson
1962^{♠}	(Australia) Rod Laver
1964^{●}	(Australia) Roy Emerson
Open Era
1969^{♠}	(Australia) Rod Laver
1973	(Australia) John Newcombe
1974^{●}	(United States) Jimmy Connors
1988^{●}	(Sweden) Mats Wilander
2004^{●}	(Switzerland) Roger Federer
2006^{●}	(Switzerland) Roger Federer
2007^{●}	(Switzerland) Roger Federer
2011^{●}	(Serbia) Novak Djokovic
2015^{●}	(Serbia) Novak Djokovic
2023^{●}	(Serbia) Novak Djokovic
2024	(Italy) Jannik Sinner

French—Wimbledon ‡
1925	(France) René Lacoste
1933^{●}	(Australia) Jack Crawford
1935	(United Kingdom) Fred Perry
1938^{♠}	(United States) Don Budge
1950	(United States) Budge Patty
1955^{●}	(United States) Tony Trabert
1956^{●}	(Australia) Lew Hoad
1962^{♠}	(Australia) Rod Laver
Open Era
1969^{♠}	(Australia) Rod Laver
1978	(Sweden) Björn Borg
1979	(Sweden) Björn Borg
1980	(Sweden) Björn Borg
2008	(Spain) Rafael Nadal
2009	(Switzerland) Roger Federer
2010^{●}	(Spain) Rafael Nadal
2021^{●}	(Serbia) Novak Djokovic
2024	(Spain) Carlos Alcaraz

French—U.S.
1927	(France) René Lacoste
1928	(France) Henri Cochet
1938^{♠}	(United States) Don Budge
1955^{●}	(United States) Tony Trabert
1962^{♠}	(Australia) Rod Laver
Open Era
1969^{♠}	(Australia) Rod Laver
1977	(Argentina) Guillermo Vilas
1986	(Czechoslovakia) Ivan Lendl
1987	(Czechoslovakia) Ivan Lendl
1988^{●}	(Sweden) Mats Wilander
1999	(United States) Andre Agassi
2010^{●}	(Spain) Rafael Nadal
2013	(Spain) Rafael Nadal
2017	(Spain) Rafael Nadal
2019	(Spain) Rafael Nadal
2023^{●}	(Serbia) Novak Djokovic
2025	(Spain) Carlos Alcaraz
2026	(Germany) Alexander Zverev

Wimbledon—U.S.
1903	(United Kingdom) Laurence Doherty
1920	(United States) Bill Tilden
1921	(United States) Bill Tilden
1932	(United States) Ellsworth Vines
1934^{●}	(United Kingdom) Fred Perry
1936	(United Kingdom) Fred Perry
1937	(United States) Don Budge
1938^{♠}	(United States) Don Budge
1939	(United States) Bobby Riggs
1947	(United States) Jack Kramer
1952	(Australia) Frank Sedgman
1955^{●}	(United States) Tony Trabert
1958^{●}	(Australia) Ashley Cooper
1960	(Australia) Neale Fraser
1962^{♠}	(Australia) Rod Laver
1964^{●}	(Australia) Roy Emerson
1967	(Australia) John Newcombe
Open Era
1969^{♠}	(Australia) Rod Laver
1974^{●}	(United States) Jimmy Connors
1981	(United States) John McEnroe
1982	(United States) Jimmy Connors
1984	(United States) John McEnroe
1989	(West Germany) Boris Becker
1993	(United States) Pete Sampras
1995	(United States) Pete Sampras
2004^{●}	(Switzerland) Roger Federer
2005	(Switzerland) Roger Federer
2006^{●}	(Switzerland) Roger Federer
2007^{●}	(Switzerland) Roger Federer
2010^{●}	(Spain) Rafael Nadal
2011^{●}	(Serbia) Novak Djokovic
2015^{●}	(Serbia) Novak Djokovic
2018	(Serbia) Novak Djokovic

== Tournament statistics ==
=== Most titles per tournament ===
Tournament	Titles	Player(s)
Australian Open	10	(Serbia) Novak Djokovic
French Open	14	(Spain) Rafael Nadal
Wimbledon	8	(Switzerland) Roger Federer
US Open	7 (All-time)	(United States) Richard Sears (United States) William Larned (United States) Bill Tilden
US Open	5 (Open Era)	(United States) Jimmy Connors (United States) Pete Sampras (Switzerland) Roger Federer

| class="col-break " style=" padding-left: 3em;" |

=== At one tournament ===
Most	#	Player	Tournament	Years
Titles	14	(Spain) Rafael Nadal	French Open	2005–22
Finals	14	(Spain) Rafael Nadal	French Open	2005–22
Semi-finals	15	(Switzerland) Roger Federer	Australian Open	2004–20
Semi-finals	15	(Spain) Rafael Nadal	French Open	2005–22
Semi-finals	15	(Serbia) Novak Djokovic	Wimbledon	2007–26
Quarter-finals	19	(Serbia) Novak Djokovic	French Open	2006–25
Finals without win (Note: Most finals played without winning the title.)	5	(United Kingdom) Andy Murray	Australian Open	2010–16
Runner-up finishes (Note: Most times finished as runner-up, having previously won the tournament.)	6	(Serbia) Novak Djokovic	US Open	2007–21
Match wins	112	(Spain) Rafael Nadal	French Open	2005–22
Consecutive wins	41	(Sweden) Björn Borg	Wimbledon	1976–81
Matches played	121	(Serbia) Novak Djokovic	French Open	2005–26
Matches played	121	(Serbia) Novak Djokovic	Wimbledon	2005–26
Entries	22	(United States) Jimmy Connors	US Open	1970–92
Entries	22	(Switzerland) Roger Federer	Wimbledon	1999–21
Entries	22	(France) Richard Gasquet	French Open	2002–25
Entries	22	(Serbia) Novak Djokovic	French Open	2005–26

== Consecutive titles ==
AO Australian Open	WIM Wimbledon
FO French Open	USO US Open

=== Overall record ===
Titles	Player	First event	Last event
6	(United States) Don Budge	1937 WIM	1938 USO
4	(Australia) Rod Laver	1969 AO	1969 USO
4	(Serbia) Novak Djokovic	2015 WIM	2016 FO

=== At one tournament ===
Titles	Player	Tourn.	Years
7	(United States) Richard Sears (Note: Richard Sears won 6 titles in a challenge round match.)	USO	1881–87
6	(United Kingdom) William Renshaw (Note: William Renshaw won 5 titles in a challenge round match.)	WIM	1881–86
6	(United States) Bill Tilden	USO	1920–25
5	(Australia) Roy Emerson	AO	1963–67
5	(Sweden) Björn Borg	WIM	1976–80
5	(Switzerland) Roger Federer	WIM	2003–07
5	(Switzerland) Roger Federer	USO	2004–08
5	(Spain) Rafael Nadal	FO	2010–14

== Grand Slam titles by decade ==
as of 2026 US Open.

- Note: Ken Rosewall, Novak Djokovic, and Rafael Nadal are the only male players to win Grand Slam singles titles in three different decades. Nadal is the only player to win multiple titles in all three decades, winning at least 3 titles in all three decades.

1870s

1	S. Gore, Hadow, Hartley

1880s

7	W. Renshaw, Sears

2	Slocum

1	E. Renshaw, Hartley, Lawford

1890s

4	Wrenn

3	Baddeley, Campbell, R. Doherty

2	Pim, Whitman

1	Hamilton, Hovey, Mahony

1900s

6	L. Doherty

5	Larned

3	A. Gore

2	Wilding

1	Alexander, Brookes, Clothier, R. Doherty, Heath, Rice, Ward, Whitman, Wright

1910s

4	Wilding

2	Brookes, Johnston, Larned, Lindley Murray, McLoughlin, Williams

1	Cecil Parke, Heath, Kingscote, Lowe, A. O'Hara Wood, E. Parker, Patterson

1920s

9	Tilden

7	Lacoste

5	Cochet

3	J. Anderson, Borotra

2	P. O'Hara Wood, Patterson

1	Gemmell, Gregory, Hawkes, Johnston

1930s

8	Perry

6	Budge, Crawford

3	Vines

2	Cochet, von Cramm, Riggs

1	Allison, Borotra, Bromwich, Doeg, Henkel, McGrath, McNeill, Moon, Quist, Tilden, Wood

1940s

4	Parker

3	Kramer

2	Gonzales, Quist, Schroeder

1	Asbóth, Bernard, Bromwich, Falkenburg, Hunt, McNeill, Pails, Petra, Riggs, Sedgman

1950s

5	Trabert

4	Cooper, Hoad, Rosewall, Sedgman

3	Drobný

2	Olmedo, Patty, Rose, Savitt, Seixas

1	M. Anderson, Davidson, Fraser, Larsen, McGregor, Pietrangeli

1960s

12	Emerson

11	Laver

4	Santana

2	Fraser, Newcombe, Stolle

1	Ashe, Bowrey, McKinley, Osuna, Pietrangeli, Roche, Rosewall

1970s

8	Borg

5	Newcombe, Connors

4	Vilas

3	Rosewall, Kodeš

2	Smith, Năstase, Ashe

1	Edmondson, Gerulaitis, Gimeno, McEnroe, Orantes, Panatta, Tanner

1980s

7	Lendl, Wilander

6	McEnroe

4	Becker

3	Borg, Connors, Edberg

2	Kriek

1	Cash, Chang, Noah, Teacher

1990s

12	Sampras

5	Agassi

4	Courier

3	Edberg

2	Becker, Bruguera, Kafelnikov, Rafter

1	Gómez, Korda, Krajicek, Kuerten, Lendl, Moyá, Muster, Stich

2000s

15	Federer

6	Nadal

3	Agassi

2	Hewitt, Kuerten, Safin, Sampras

1	Costa, Djokovic, Ferrero, Gaudio, Ivanišević, Johansson, del Potro, Roddick

2010s

15	Djokovic

13	Nadal

5	Federer

3	Murray, Wawrinka

1	Čilić

2020s

8	Djokovic

7	Alcaraz

5	Sinner

3	Nadal

2	Zverev

1	Medvedev, Thiem

== Grand Slam titles by country ==
=== All-time ===
as of 2026 US Open.

147	United States (49 players)

100	Australia (34 players)

48	Great Britain (19 players)

40	Spain (9 players)

26	Sweden (5 players)

24	Serbia (1 player)

23	Switzerland (2 players)

21	France (6 players)

12	Czechoslovakia / Czech Republic (3 players), Germany / West Germany (5 players)

8	Italy (3 players)

6	Argentina (3 players), New Zealand (1 player)

5	Russia (3 players)

3	Brazil (1 player), Egypt (1 player)

2	Austria (2 players), Croatia (2 players), Romania (1 player)

1	Ecuador, Hungary, Mexico, Netherlands, South Africa

=== Open Era ===
as of 2026 US Open.

52	United States (13 players)

36	Spain (8 players)

25	Sweden (4 players)

24	Serbia (1 player)

23	Switzerland (2 players)

20	Australia (7 players)

12	Czechoslovakia / Czech Republic (3 players)

9	West Germany / Germany (3 players)

6	Argentina (3 players), Italy (2 players)

5	Russia (3 players)

3	Brazil (1 player), Great Britain (1 player)

2	Austria (2 players), Croatia (2 players), Romania (1 player)

1	Ecuador, France, Netherlands, South Africa

== See also ==
=== List of Grand Slam records lists ===
- Chronological list of men's Grand Slam tennis champions
- List of Grand Slam men's singles finals
- List of Grand Slam–related tennis records
- Major professional tennis tournaments before the Open Era
- List of ATP Tour top-level tournament singles champions
- Lists of tennis records and statistics

=== List of Grand Slam champions ===
- List of Grand Slam men's doubles champions
- List of Grand Slam women's singles champions
- List of Grand Slam women's doubles champions
- List of Grand Slam mixed doubles champions
- List of Grand Slam boys' singles champions
- List of Grand Slam girls' singles champions
