= 1974 World Championship Tennis circuit =

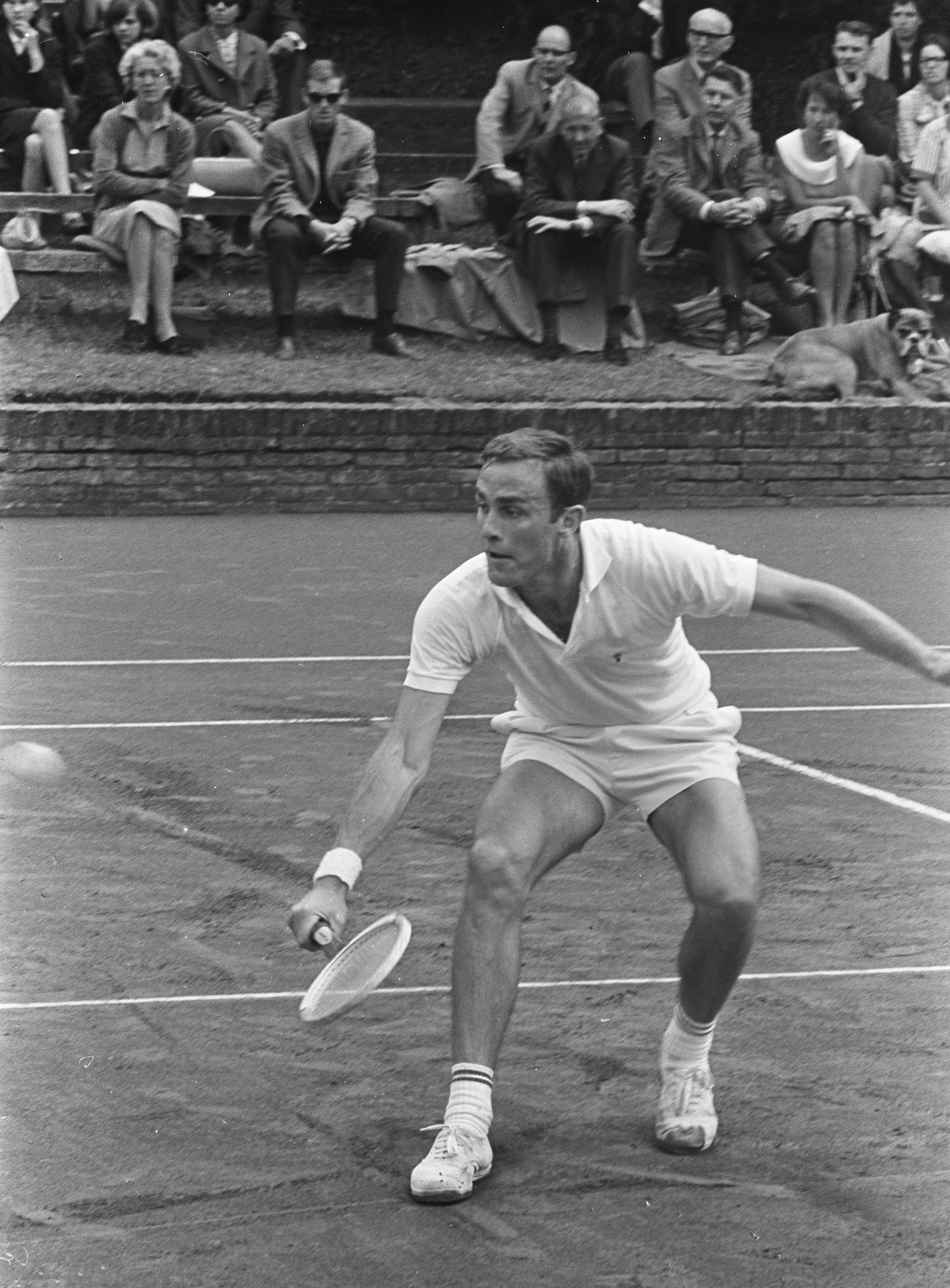
- Newcombe reached 6 finals

Details
- Duration: 21 January 1974 – 12 May 1974
- Edition: 7th
- Tournaments: 26

Achievements (singles)
- Most titles: (Australia) John Newcombe (5)
- Most finals: (Australia) John Newcombe (6)
- Prize money leader: (Australia) John Newcombe ($174,085)
- Points leader: (Australia) John Newcombe (507)

The 1974 World Championship Tennis (WCT) circuit was one of the two rival professional male tennis circuits of 1974, the other being the Grand Prix circuit. It was organized by World Championship Tennis (WCT). It was the fourth edition of the WCT circuit and a total of 84 players participated. All players took part in the opening U.S. Pro Indoor tournament in Philadelphia and afterwards were divided into three groups (red, blue and green) of 28 players, with each group playing eight further tournaments.

The season final was played in Dallas by the eight best performers, the top two of each group plus the next two highest point winners, and was won by Australian John Newcombe who defeated Björn Borg from Sweden in four sets, 4–6, 6–3, 6–3, 6–2. Newcombe ended the season as prize money and points leader.

== Overview ==
Week of	Tournament	Location	Draw	Prize money	Surface	Winner	Finalist
21 January	U.S. Pro Indoor	Philadelphia, Pennsylvania, US	128	$100,000	Carpet / indoor	(Australia) Rod Laver	(United States) Arthur Ashe
28 January	Fidelity Tournament	Richmond, Virginia, US	32	$50,000	Carpet / indoor	(Romania) Ilie Năstase	(United States) Tom Gorman
4 February	St. Petersburg WCT	St. Petersburg, Florida, US	32	$50,000	Carpet / indoor	(Australia) John Newcombe	(Soviet Union) Alex Metreveli
11 February	Astor Cup	Bologna, Italy	32	$50,000	Carpet / indoor	(United States) Arthur Ashe	(United Kingdom) Mark Cox
11 February	Rothmans	Toronto, Canada	32	$50,000	Carpet / indoor	(Netherlands) Tom Okker	(Romania) Ilie Năstase
18 February	Hempstead WCT	Hempstead, New York, US	32	$50,000	Carpet / indoor	(United States) Stan Smith	(Australia) John Newcombe
18 February	Rothmans	London, UK	32	$50,000	Carpet / indoor	(Sweden) Björn Borg	(United Kingdom) Mark Cox
25 February	Barcelona WCT	Barcelona, Spain	32	$50,000	Carpet / indoor	(United States) Arthur Ashe	(Sweden) Björn Borg
25 February	Michelob Pro–Celebrity Classic	La Costa, California, US	32	$50,000	Hard / outdoor	(Australia) John Newcombe	(United States) Stan Smith
25 February	Saga Bay Classic	Miami, US	32	$50,000	Carpet / indoor	(South Africa) Cliff Drysdale	(United States) Tom Gorman
11 March	São Paulo WCT	São Paulo, Brazil	32	$50,000	Carpet / indoor	(Sweden) Björn Borg	(United States) Arthur Ashe
11 March	Washington WCT	Washington, D.C., US	32	$50,000	Carpet / indoor	(Romania) Ilie Năstase	(Netherlands) Tom Okker
15 March	Rotterdam	Rotterdam, Netherlands	32	$50,000	Carpet / indoor	(Netherlands) Tom Okker	(United States) Tom Gorman
15 March	Atlanta WCT	Atlanta Georgia, US	32	$50,000	Carpet / indoor	(United States) Dick Stockton	(Czechoslovakia) Jiří Hřebec
15 March	Palm Desert WCT	Palm Desert, California, US	32	$50,000	Hard / outdoor	(Australia) Rod Laver	(United States) Roscoe Tanner
1 April	Munich WCT	Munich, Germany	32	$50,000	Carpet / indoor	(South Africa) Frew McMillan	(Socialist Federal Republic of Yugoslavia) Niki Pilić
1 April	New Orleans WCT	New Orleans, Louisiana, US	32	$50,000	Carpet / indoor	(Australia) John Newcombe	(United States) Jeff Borowiak
8 April	Monte Carlo WCT	Roquebrune-Cap-Martin, France	32	$50,000	Clay / outdoor	(Rhodesia) Andrew Pattison	(Romania) Ilie Năstase
8 April	Orlando WCT	Orlando, Florida, US	32	$50,000	Hard / outdoor	(Australia) John Newcombe	(Chile) Jaime Fillol
8 April	Tokyo WCT	Tokyo, Japan	32	$50,000	Hard / outdoor	(Australia) Rod Laver	(Spain) Juan Gisbert
15 April	Johannesburg WCT	Johannesburg, South Africa	32	$50,000	Hard / outdoor	(Rhodesia) Andrew Pattison	(Australia) John Alexander
15 April	Charlotte WCT	Charlotte, North Carolina, US	32	$50,000	Clay / outdoor	(United States) Jeff Borowiak	(United States) Dick Stockton
15 April	Houston WCT	Houston, Texas, US	32	$50,000	Clay / outdoor	(Australia) Rod Laver	(Sweden) Björn Borg
22 April	Denver WCT	Denver, Colorado, US	32	$50,000	Carpet / indoor	(United States) Roscoe Tanner	(United States) Arthur Ashe
22 April	St. Louis WCT	St. Louis, Missouri, US	32	$50,000	Carpet / indoor	(United States) Stan Smith	(Soviet Union) Alex Metreveli
8 May	Dallas WCT Finals	Dallas, Texas, US	8	$100,000	Carpet / indoor	(Australia) John Newcombe	(Sweden) Björn Borg

== Schedule ==
The schedule of events on the 1974 WCT circuit, with player progression documented until the quarterfinals stage.

=== January ===
Week	Tournament	Champions	Runners-up	Semifinalists	Quarterfinalists
21 Jan	U.S. Pro Indoor; Philadelphia, United States; Carpet (i) – $100,000 – 128S/64D	(Australia) Rod Laver; 6–1, 6–4, 3–6, 6–4	(United States) Arthur Ashe	(Czechoslovakia) Jan Kodeš (Australia) Tony Roche	(Netherlands) Tom Okker (Italy) Adriano Panatta (United States) Eddie Dibbs (United Kingdom) Mark Cox
21 Jan	U.S. Pro Indoor; Philadelphia, United States; Carpet (i) – $100,000 – 128S/64D	(South Africa) Pat Cramer (United States) Mike Estep; 7–6, 6–7, 6–3	(France) Jean-Baptiste Chanfreau (France) Georges Goven	(Czechoslovakia) Jan Kodeš (Australia) Tony Roche	(Netherlands) Tom Okker (Italy) Adriano Panatta (United States) Eddie Dibbs (United Kingdom) Mark Cox
28 Jan	Fidelity Tournament; Richmond, United States; Red group Carpet (i) – $50,000 – 32S/16D	(Romania) Ilie Năstase; 6–2, 6–3	(United States) Tom Gorman	(Socialist Federal Republic of Yugoslavia) Niki Pilić (France) Patrice Dominguez	(France) Georges Goven (United States) Billy Martin (South Africa) Cliff Drysdale (United States) Marty Riessen
28 Jan	Fidelity Tournament; Richmond, United States; Red group Carpet (i) – $50,000 – 32S/16D	(Socialist Federal Republic of Yugoslavia) Nikola Pilić (Australia) Allan Stone; 6–3, 3–6, 7–6	(Australia) John Alexander (Australia) Phil Dent	(Socialist Federal Republic of Yugoslavia) Niki Pilić (France) Patrice Dominguez	(France) Georges Goven (United States) Billy Martin (South Africa) Cliff Drysdale (United States) Marty Riessen

=== February ===
Week	Tournament	Champions	Runners-up	Semifinalists	Quarterfinalists
4 Feb	St. Petersburg WCT; St. Petersburg, United States; Blue group Carpet (i) – $50,000 – 32S/16D	(Australia) John Newcombe; 6–0, 7–6^{(7–3)}	(Soviet Union) Alex Metreveli	(Australia) Ross Case (Mexico) Raúl Ramírez	(United States) Dick Stockton (Czechoslovakia) Jiří Hřebec (United States) Stan Smith (United States) Brian Gottfried
4 Feb	St. Petersburg WCT; St. Petersburg, United States; Blue group Carpet (i) – $50,000 – 32S/16D	(Australia) Owen Davidson (Australia) John Newcombe; 4–6, 6–3, 6–4	(United States) Clark Graebner (United States) Charlie Pasarell	(Australia) Ross Case (Mexico) Raúl Ramírez	(United States) Dick Stockton (Czechoslovakia) Jiří Hřebec (United States) Stan Smith (United States) Brian Gottfried
11 Feb	Astor Cup; Bologna, Italy; Green group Carpet (i) – $50,000 – 32S/16D; Singles – Doubles	(United States) Arthur Ashe; 6–4, 7–5	(United Kingdom) Mark Cox	(United Kingdom) Roger Taylor (Romania) Ion Țiriac	(United Kingdom) Graham Stilwell (Italy) Adriano Panatta (Australia) Rod Laver (Australia) Colin Dibley
11 Feb	Astor Cup; Bologna, Italy; Green group Carpet (i) – $50,000 – 32S/16D; Singles – Doubles	(Sweden) Ove Nils Bengtson (Sweden) Björn Borg; 6–4, 5–7, 4–6, 7–6, 6–2	(United States) Arthur Ashe (United States) Roscoe Tanner	(United Kingdom) Roger Taylor (Romania) Ion Țiriac	(United Kingdom) Graham Stilwell (Italy) Adriano Panatta (Australia) Rod Laver (Australia) Colin Dibley
11 Feb	Toronto Indoor; Toronto, Canada; Red group Carpet (i) – $50,000 – 32S/16D	(Netherlands) Tom Okker; 7–6, 6–2	(Romania) Ilie Năstase	(Australia) John Alexander (United States) Marty Riessen	(Australia) Tony Roche (United States) Erik van Dillen (Australia) Phil Dent (South Africa) Bob Hewitt
11 Feb	Toronto Indoor; Toronto, Canada; Red group Carpet (i) – $50,000 – 32S/16D	(Mexico) Raúl Ramírez (Australia) Tony Roche; 6–3, 2–6, 6–4	(Netherlands) Tom Okker (United States) Marty Riessen	(Australia) John Alexander (United States) Marty Riessen	(Australia) Tony Roche (United States) Erik van Dillen (Australia) Phil Dent (South Africa) Bob Hewitt
15 Feb	Rothmans International; London, England; Green group Carpet (i) – $50,000 – 32S/16D	(Sweden) Björn Borg; 6–7, 7–6, 6–4	(United Kingdom) Mark Cox	(United States) Roscoe Tanner (Czechoslovakia) Jan Kodeš	(United States) Arthur Ashe (United Kingdom) Stephen Warboys (Australia) Rod Laver (Sweden) Ove Bengtson
15 Feb	Rothmans International; London, England; Green group Carpet (i) – $50,000 – 32S/16D	(Sweden) Ove Nils Bengtson (Sweden) Björn Borg; 7–6, 6–3	(United Kingdom) Mark Farrell (United Kingdom) John Lloyd	(United States) Roscoe Tanner (Czechoslovakia) Jan Kodeš	(United States) Arthur Ashe (United Kingdom) Stephen Warboys (Australia) Rod Laver (Sweden) Ove Bengtson
18 Feb	Hempstead WCT; Hempstead, United States; Blue group Carpet (i) – $50,000 – 32S/16D	(United States) Stan Smith; 6–4, 3–6, 6–3	(Australia) John Newcombe	(Soviet Union) Alex Metreveli (New Zealand) Brian Fairlie	(Egypt) Ismail El Shafei (Czechoslovakia) Jiří Hřebec (Czechoslovakia) Milan Holeček (United States) Cliff Richey
18 Feb	Hempstead WCT; Hempstead, United States; Blue group Carpet (i) – $50,000 – 32S/16D	(United States) Jeff Borowiak (Australia) Dick Crealy; 6–7, 6–4, 6–4	(Australia) Ross Case (Australia) Geoff Masters	(Soviet Union) Alex Metreveli (New Zealand) Brian Fairlie	(Egypt) Ismail El Shafei (Czechoslovakia) Jiří Hřebec (Czechoslovakia) Milan Holeček (United States) Cliff Richey
25 Feb	Barcelona WCT; Barcelona, Spain; Green group Carpet (i) – $50,000 – 32S/16D	(United States) Arthur Ashe; 6–4, 3–6, 6–3	(Sweden) Björn Borg	(United States) Eddie Dibbs (Czechoslovakia) Vladimír Zedník	(United Kingdom) Roger Taylor (Italy) Adriano Panatta (United States) Tom Leonard (Romania) Ion Țiriac
25 Feb	Barcelona WCT; Barcelona, Spain; Green group Carpet (i) – $50,000 – 32S/16D	(United States) Arthur Ashe (United States) Roscoe Tanner; 6–3, 6–4	(United States) Tom Edlefsen (United States) Tom Leonard	(United States) Eddie Dibbs (Czechoslovakia) Vladimír Zedník	(United Kingdom) Roger Taylor (Italy) Adriano Panatta (United States) Tom Leonard (Romania) Ion Țiriac
25 Feb	Michelob Pro–Celebrity Classic; La Costa, United States; Blue group Hard – $50,000 – 32S/16D	(Australia) John Newcombe; 6–2, 4–6, 6–4	(United States) Stan Smith	(Chile) Patricio Cornejo (Mexico) Raúl Ramírez	(United States) Brian Gottfried (Soviet Union) Alex Metreveli (Australia) Dick Crealy (United States) Dick Stockton
25 Feb	Michelob Pro–Celebrity Classic; La Costa, United States; Blue group Hard – $50,000 – 32S/16D	(United States) Clark Graebner (United States) Charlie Pasarell; 6–4, 6–7, 7–5	(Australia) Roy Emerson (United States) Dennis Ralston	(Chile) Patricio Cornejo (Mexico) Raúl Ramírez	(United States) Brian Gottfried (Soviet Union) Alex Metreveli (Australia) Dick Crealy (United States) Dick Stockton
25 Feb	Miami Saga Bay Tennis Classic; Miami, United States; Red group Carpet (i) – $50,000 – 32S/16D	(South Africa) Cliff Drysdale; 6–4, 7–5	(United States) Tom Gorman	(Netherlands) Tom Okker (Australia) John Alexander	(France) Patrick Proisy (Socialist Federal Republic of Yugoslavia) Niki Pilić (United States) Mike Estep (Romania) Ilie Năstase
25 Feb	Miami Saga Bay Tennis Classic; Miami, United States; Red group Carpet (i) – $50,000 – 32S/16D	(Australia) John Alexander (Australia) Phil Dent; 4–6, 6–4, 7–5	(Netherlands) Tom Okker (United States) Marty Riessen	(Netherlands) Tom Okker (Australia) John Alexander	(France) Patrick Proisy (Socialist Federal Republic of Yugoslavia) Niki Pilić (United States) Mike Estep (Romania) Ilie Năstase

=== March ===
Week	Tournament	Champions	Runners-up	Semifinalists	Quarterfinalists
11 Mar	São Paulo WCT; São Paulo, Brasil; Green group Carpet (i) – $50,000 – 32S/16D	(Sweden) Björn Borg; 6–2, 3–6, 6–3	(United States) Arthur Ashe	(Brazil) Thomaz Koch (Italy) Antonio Zugarelli	(Romania) Ion Țiriac (United States) Harold Solomon (United Kingdom) Mark Cox (Australia) Rod Laver
11 Mar	São Paulo WCT; São Paulo, Brasil; Green group Carpet (i) – $50,000 – 32S/16D	(Italy) Adriano Panatta (Romania) Ion Țiriac; 7–5, 3–6, 6–3	(Sweden) Ove Nils Bengtson (Sweden) Björn Borg	(Brazil) Thomaz Koch (Italy) Antonio Zugarelli	(Romania) Ion Țiriac (United States) Harold Solomon (United Kingdom) Mark Cox (Australia) Rod Laver
11 Mar	Xerox WCT Tennis Classic; Washington, United States; Red group Carpet (i) – $50,000 – 32S/16D	(Romania) Ilie Năstase; 6–3, 6–3	(Netherlands) Tom Okker	(South Africa) Cliff Drysdale (United States) Tom Gorman	(Australia) Tony Roche (United States) Marty Riessen (France) Patrick Proisy (Socialist Federal Republic of Yugoslavia) Niki Pilić
11 Mar	Xerox WCT Tennis Classic; Washington, United States; Red group Carpet (i) – $50,000 – 32S/16D	(South Africa) Bob Hewitt (South Africa) Frew McMillan; 7–6, 6–3	(Netherlands) Tom Okker (United States) Marty Riessen	(South Africa) Cliff Drysdale (United States) Tom Gorman	(Australia) Tony Roche (United States) Marty Riessen (France) Patrick Proisy (Socialist Federal Republic of Yugoslavia) Niki Pilić
25 Mar	1974 ABN World Tennis Tournament; Rotterdam, Netherlands; Green group Carpet (i) – $50,000 – 32S/16D; Singles – Doubles	(Netherlands) Tom Okker; 4–6, 7–6, 6–1	(United States) Tom Gorman	(South Africa) Cliff Drysdale (West Germany) Hans-Jürgen Pohmann	(United States) Marty Riessen (Spain) Manuel Orantes (Socialist Federal Republic of Yugoslavia) Niki Pilić (France) Pierre Barthès
25 Mar	1974 ABN World Tennis Tournament; Rotterdam, Netherlands; Green group Carpet (i) – $50,000 – 32S/16D; Singles – Doubles	(South Africa) Bob Hewitt (South Africa) Frew McMillan; 3–6, 6–4, 6–3	(France) Pierre Barthès (Romania) Ilie Năstase	(South Africa) Cliff Drysdale (West Germany) Hans-Jürgen Pohmann	(United States) Marty Riessen (Spain) Manuel Orantes (Socialist Federal Republic of Yugoslavia) Niki Pilić (France) Pierre Barthès
25 Mar	Peachtree Corners Classic; Atlanta, United States; Blue group Carpet (i) – $50,000 – 32S/16D	(United States) Dick Stockton; 6–2, 6–1	(Czechoslovakia) Jiří Hřebec	(Australia) Ross Case (Australia) Geoff Masters	(Australia) John Newcombe (United States) Brian Gottfried (Soviet Union) Alex Metreveli (New Zealand) Brian Fairlie
25 Mar	Peachtree Corners Classic; Atlanta, United States; Blue group Carpet (i) – $50,000 – 32S/16D	(United States) Bob Lutz (United States) Stan Smith; 6–3, 3–6, 7–6	(United States) Brian Gottfried (United States) Dick Stockton	(Australia) Ross Case (Australia) Geoff Masters	(Australia) John Newcombe (United States) Brian Gottfried (Soviet Union) Alex Metreveli (New Zealand) Brian Fairlie
25 Mar	Palm Desert WCT; Palm Desert, United States; Green group Hard – $50,000 – 32S/16D	(Australia) Rod Laver; 6–4, 6–2	(United States) Roscoe Tanner	(United States) Arthur Ashe (United States) Eddie Dibbs	(United States) Dennis Ralston (United States) Harold Solomon (Czechoslovakia) Jan Kodeš (United Kingdom) Mark Cox
25 Mar	Palm Desert WCT; Palm Desert, United States; Green group Hard – $50,000 – 32S/16D	(Czechoslovakia) Jan Kodeš (Czechoslovakia) Vladimír Zedník; 6–4, 6–4	(South Africa) Raymond Moore (New Zealand) Onny Parun	(United States) Arthur Ashe (United States) Eddie Dibbs	(United States) Dennis Ralston (United States) Harold Solomon (Czechoslovakia) Jan Kodeš (United Kingdom) Mark Cox

=== April ===
Week	Tournament	Champions	Runners-up	Semifinalists	Quarterfinalists
1 Apr	Munich WCT; Munich, West Germany; Red group Carpet (i) – $50,000 – 32S/16D	(South Africa) Frew McMillan; 6–7, 7–6, 7–6	(Socialist Federal Republic of Yugoslavia) Niki Pilić	(Australia) Tony Roche (Australia) Phil Dent	(Spain) Manuel Orantes (South Africa) Bob Maud (United States) Erik van Dillen (United States) Marty Riessen
1 Apr	Munich WCT; Munich, West Germany; Red group Carpet (i) – $50,000 – 32S/16D	(South Africa) Bob Hewitt (South Africa) Frew McMillan; 6–2, 7–6	(France) Pierre Barthès (Romania) Ilie Năstase	(Australia) Tony Roche (Australia) Phil Dent	(Spain) Manuel Orantes (South Africa) Bob Maud (United States) Erik van Dillen (United States) Marty Riessen
1 Apr	New Orleans WCT; New Orleans, United States; Blue group Carpet (i) – $50,000 – 32S/16D	(Australia) John Newcombe; 6–4, 6–2	(United States) Jeff Borowiak	(Socialist Federal Republic of Yugoslavia) Željko Franulović (Czechoslovakia) Jiří Hřebec	(United States) Bob Lutz (United States) Stan Smith (United States) Frank Froehling (United States) Charlie Pasarell
1 Apr	New Orleans WCT; New Orleans, United States; Blue group Carpet (i) – $50,000 – 32S/16D	(United States) Bob Lutz (United States) Stan Smith; 4–6, 6–4, 7–6	(Australia) Owen Davidson (Australia) John Newcombe	(Socialist Federal Republic of Yugoslavia) Željko Franulović (Czechoslovakia) Jiří Hřebec	(United States) Bob Lutz (United States) Stan Smith (United States) Frank Froehling (United States) Charlie Pasarell
8 Apr	Monte Carlo WCT; Monte Carlo, Monaco; Red group Clay – $50,000 – 32S/16D	(Rhodesia) Andrew Pattison; 5–7, 6–3, 6–4	(Romania) Ilie Năstase	(South Africa) Bob Maud (United States) Marty Riessen	(Hungary) Balázs Taróczy (Australia) John Alexander (United States) Mike Estep (South Africa) Cliff Drysdale
8 Apr	Monte Carlo WCT; Monte Carlo, Monaco; Red group Clay – $50,000 – 32S/16D	(Australia) John Alexander (Australia) Phil Dent; 7–6, 4–6, 7–6, 6–3	(Spain) Manuel Orantes (Australia) Tony Roche	(South Africa) Bob Maud (United States) Marty Riessen	(Hungary) Balázs Taróczy (Australia) John Alexander (United States) Mike Estep (South Africa) Cliff Drysdale
8 Apr	Orlando WCT; Orlando, United States; Blue group Hard – $50,000 – 32S/16D	(Australia) John Newcombe; 6–2, 3–6, 6–3	(Chile) Jaime Fillol	(United Kingdom) Buster Mottram (United States) Stan Smith	(Mexico) Raúl Ramírez (United States) Jeff Borowiak (United States) Raz Reid (United States) Cliff Richey
8 Apr	Orlando WCT; Orlando, United States; Blue group Hard – $50,000 – 32S/16D	(Australia) Owen Davidson (Australia) John Newcombe; 7–6, 6–3	(United States) Brian Gottfried (United States) Dick Stockton	(United Kingdom) Buster Mottram (United States) Stan Smith	(Mexico) Raúl Ramírez (United States) Jeff Borowiak (United States) Raz Reid (United States) Cliff Richey
8 Apr	Tokyo WCT; Tokyo, Japan; Green group Hard – $50,000 – 32S/16D	(Australia) Rod Laver; 5–7, 6–2, 6–0	(Spain) Juan Gisbert	(Sweden) Björn Borg (New Zealand) Onny Parun	(South Africa) Ray Moore (United States) Paul Gerken (Argentina) Guillermo Vilas (Italy) Adriano Panatta
8 Apr	Tokyo WCT; Tokyo, Japan; Green group Hard – $50,000 – 32S/16D	(South Africa) Raymond Moore (New Zealand) Onny Parun; 4–6, 6–2, 6–4	(Spain) Juan Gisbert (United Kingdom) Roger Taylor	(Sweden) Björn Borg (New Zealand) Onny Parun	(South Africa) Ray Moore (United States) Paul Gerken (Argentina) Guillermo Vilas (Italy) Adriano Panatta
15 Apr	Johannesburg Indoor; Johannesburg, South Africa; Red group Hard – $50,000 – 32S/16D	(Rhodesia) Andrew Pattison; 6–3, 7–5	(Australia) John Alexander	(South Africa) Cliff Drysdale (United States) Tom Gorman	(South Africa) Frew McMillan (South Africa) John Yuill (South Africa) Deon Joubert (South Africa) Bernard Mitton
15 Apr	Johannesburg Indoor; Johannesburg, South Africa; Red group Hard – $50,000 – 32S/16D	(South Africa) Bob Hewitt (South Africa) Frew McMillan; 6–2, 6–4, 7–6	(United States) Jim McManus (United States) Andrew Pattison	(South Africa) Cliff Drysdale (United States) Tom Gorman	(South Africa) Frew McMillan (South Africa) John Yuill (South Africa) Deon Joubert (South Africa) Bernard Mitton
15 Apr	Charlotte WCT; Charlotte, United States; Blue group Clay – $50,000 – 32S/16D	(United States) Jeff Borowiak; 6–4, 5–7, 7–6^{(7–5)}	(United States) Dick Stockton	(Chile) Jaime Fillol (United States) Stan Smith	(Australia) John Newcombe (Soviet Union) Alex Metreveli (Australia) Sydney Ball (Australia) Geoff Masters
15 Apr	Charlotte WCT; Charlotte, United States; Blue group Clay – $50,000 – 32S/16D	(United Kingdom) Buster Mottram (Mexico) Raúl Ramírez; 6–3, 1–6, 6–3	(Australia) Owen Davidson (Australia) John Newcombe	(Chile) Jaime Fillol (United States) Stan Smith	(Australia) John Newcombe (Soviet Union) Alex Metreveli (Australia) Sydney Ball (Australia) Geoff Masters
15 Apr	Houston WCT; Houston, United States; Green group Clay – $50,000 – 32S/16D	(Australia) Rod Laver; 7–6, 6–2	(Sweden) Björn Borg	(New Zealand) Onny Parun (United States) Eddie Dibbs	(Australia) Colin Dibley (Argentina) Guillermo Vilas (United States) Arthur Ashe (Czechoslovakia) Vladimír Zedník
15 Apr	Houston WCT; Houston, United States; Green group Clay – $50,000 – 32S/16D	(Australia) Colin Dibley (Australia) Rod Laver; 4–6, 7–6, 6–4	(United States) Arthur Ashe (United States) Roscoe Tanner	(New Zealand) Onny Parun (United States) Eddie Dibbs	(Australia) Colin Dibley (Argentina) Guillermo Vilas (United States) Arthur Ashe (Czechoslovakia) Vladimír Zedník
22 Apr	Holton Tennis Classic; St. Louis, United States; Blue group Carpet (i) – $50,000 – 32S/16D	(United States) Stan Smith; 6–2, 3–6, 6–2	(Soviet Union) Alex Metreveli	(Australia) Dick Crealy (Australia) John Newcombe	(United States) Cliff Richey (Australia) Ross Case (United States) Clark Graebner (Egypt) Ismail El Shafei
22 Apr	Holton Tennis Classic; St. Louis, United States; Blue group Carpet (i) – $50,000 – 32S/16D	(Egypt) Ismail El Shafei (New Zealand) Brian Fairlie; 7–6, 6–7, 7–6	(Australia) Ross Case (Australia) Geoff Masters	(Australia) Dick Crealy (Australia) John Newcombe	(United States) Cliff Richey (Australia) Ross Case (United States) Clark Graebner (Egypt) Ismail El Shafei
22 Apr	United Bank Classic; Denver, United States; Green group Carpet (i) – $50,000 – 32S/16D	(United States) Roscoe Tanner; 6–2, 6–4	(United States) Arthur Ashe	(Czechoslovakia) Jan Kodeš (United Kingdom) Mark Cox	(United States) Paul Gerken (South Africa) Ray Moore (Australia) Rod Laver (United States) Eddie Dibbs
22 Apr	United Bank Classic; Denver, United States; Green group Carpet (i) – $50,000 – 32S/16D	(United States) Arthur Ashe (United States) Roscoe Tanner; 6–3, 7–6	(United Kingdom) Mark Cox (Japan) Jun Kamiwazumi	(Czechoslovakia) Jan Kodeš (United Kingdom) Mark Cox	(United States) Paul Gerken (South Africa) Ray Moore (Australia) Rod Laver (United States) Eddie Dibbs

=== May ===
Week	Tournament	Champions	Runners-up	Semifinalists	Quarterfinalists
2 May	WCT World Doubles; Montreal, Canada; WCT Finals; Carpet (i) – $80,000 – 8D	(South Africa) Bob Hewitt (South Africa) Frew McMillan; 6–2, 6–7^{(6–8)}, 6–1, 6–2	(Australia) Owen Davidson (Australia) John Newcombe		
8 May	WCT Finals; Dallas, United States; WCT Finals; Carpet (i) – $100,000 – 8S	(Australia) John Newcombe; 4–6, 6–3, 6–3, 6–2	(Sweden) Björn Borg	(United States) Stan Smith (Czechoslovakia) Jan Kodeš	(Australia) Rod Laver (Netherlands) Tom Okker (Romania) Ilie Năstase (United States) Arthur Ashe

== Standings ==
=== Red group ===
Player	Tournaments played	Tournaments won	Matches won	Matches lost	Points	Prize money
(Romania) Ilie Năstase ^{*}	11	4	37	7	457	$57,135
(Netherlands) Tom Okker ^{*}	9	2	31	7	330	$47,750
(United States) Tom Gorman	12	0	26	12	302	$26,030
(South Africa) Cliff Drysdale	12	1	25	11	252	$29,560
(Socialist Federal Republic of Yugoslavia) Niki Pilić	11	0	24	11	244	$17,970
(Rhodesia) Andrew Pattison	12	2	20	10	214	$27,970
(United States) John Alexander	12	0	15	12	182	$29,170
(United States) Marty Riessen	10	0	15	10	164	$23,360
(Australia) Tony Roche	9	0	16	8	160	$22,300
(South Africa) Frew McMillan	11	1	8	10	130	$42,725

=== Blue group ===
Player	Tournaments played	Tournaments won	Matches won	Matches lost	Points	Prize money
(Australia) John Newcombe ^{*}	11	5	38	6	507	$174,085
(United States) Stan Smith ^{*}	12	2	35	10	390	$61,900
(Soviet Union) Alex Metreveli	12	0	28	12	292	$25,285
(United States) Dick Stockton	12	1	18	11	212	$26,985
(Czechoslovakia) Jiří Hřebec	12	0	21	12	189	$14,345
(United States) Jeff Borowiak	11	1	14	10	184	$23,310
(Australia) Ross Case	12	0	18	12	150	$17,690
(Mexico) Raúl Ramírez	12	0	13	12	137	$21,250
(Chile) Jaime Fillol	11	0	11	11	136	$17,035
(United States) Cliff Richey	12	0	14	12	115	$23,315

=== Green group ===
Player	Tournaments played	Tournaments won	Matches won	Matches lost	Points	Prize money
(United States) Arthur Ashe ^{*}	12	2	37	10	415	$79,175
(Australia) Rod Laver ^{*}	10	4	33	6	395	$70,600
(Sweden) Björn Borg ^{*}	12	2	31	10	355	$76,645
(Czechoslovakia) Jan Kodeš ^{*}	13	1	33	12	350	$25,350
(United Kingdom) Mark Cox	12	0	23	12	237	$27,575
(United States) Roscoe Tanner	10	1	18	9	212	$39,440
(United States) Eddie Dibbs	11	0	17	11	180	$22,045
(United Kingdom) Roger Taylor	12	0	21	12	162	$13,610
(Italy) Adriano Panatta	11	0	19	11	155	$18,275
(New Zealand) Onny Parun	12	0	15	12	152	$14,925

^{*} Qualified for the WCT Finals. The best two players from each group qualified plus the next two players with the highest points total.

== See also ==
- 1974 Grand Prix circuit
- 1974 USLTA Indoor Circuit
- WCT Finals
