= 1974 ABN World Tennis Tournament =

- Date: 25–31 March
- Edition: 2nd
- Category: World Championship Tennis
- Draw: 32S / 16D
- Surface: Carpet / indoor
- Location: Rotterdam, Netherlands
- Venue: Rotterdam Ahoy

Champions

Singles
- (Netherlands) Tom Okker

Doubles
- (South Africa) Bob Hewitt / (South Africa) Frew McMillan
- ABN World Tennis Tournament

The 1974 ABN World Tennis Tournament was a men's tennis tournament played on indoor carpet courts at Rotterdam Ahoy in Rotterdam, Netherlands. It was part of the 1974 World Championship Tennis circuit. The tournament was held from 25 March through 31 March 1974. Second-seeded Tom Okker won the singles title.

== Finals ==
=== Singles ===
(Netherlands) Tom Okker defeated (United States) Tom Gorman 4–6, 7–6^{(7–2)}, 6–1

=== Doubles ===
(South Africa) Bob Hewitt / (South Africa) Frew McMillan defeated (France) Pierre Barthès / (Romania) Ilie Năstase 3–6, 6–4, 6–3
