= 1974 Michelob Pro–Celebrity Classic =

- Date: February 25 – March 3
- Edition: 2nd
- Category: World Championship Tennis (WCT)
- Draw: 32S / 16D
- Prize money: $50,000
- Surface: Hard / outdoor
- Location: La Costa, California, U.S.
- Venue: La Costa Country Club

Champions

Singles
- (Australia) John Newcombe

Doubles
- (United States) Clark Graebner / (United States) Charlie Pasarell
- La Costa WCT

The 1974 Michelob Pro–Celebrity Classic, also known as the La Costa WCT, was a men's tennis tournament played on outdoor hard courts at the La Costa Country Club in La Costa, California in the United States. The tournament was part of the Blue Group of the 1974 World Championship Tennis circuit. It was the second edition of the event and was held from February 25 through March 3, 1974. Unseeded John Newcombe won the singles title and earned $10,000 first-prize money.

== Finals ==
=== Singles ===
(Australia) John Newcombe defeated (United States) Stan Smith 6–2, 4–6, 6–4

- It was Newcombe's 2nd singles title of the year and the 33rd of his career.

=== Doubles ===
(United States) Clark Graebner / (United States) Charlie Pasarell defeated (Australia) Roy Emerson / (United States) Dennis Ralston 6–4, 6–7, 7–5
