= Tokyo WCT =

Defunct tennis tournament
- Event name: Kawasaki Tennis Classic (1974-75)
- Tour: WCT tour
- Founded: 1972
- Abolished: 1975
- Editions: 3
- Location: Tokyo, Japan
- Surface: Carpet / indoor

The Tokyo WCT was a men's tennis tournament played in Tokyo, Japan in 1972, 1973 and 1975. The event was part of the World Championship Tennis (WCT) circuit and was held on indoor carpet courts. The 1974 and 1975 editions were also known by their sponsored name Kawasaki Tennis Classic.

== Finals ==
=== Singles ===
Year	Champions	Runners-up	Score
1972	(Australia) Ken Rosewall	(Australia) Fred Stolle	7–5, 6–3, 6–3
1974	(Australia) Rod Laver	(Spain) Juan Gisbert	5–7, 6–2, 6–0
1975	(United States) Bob Lutz	(United States) Stan Smith	6–4, 6–4

=== Doubles ===
Year	Champions	Runners-up	Score
1972	(Australia) John Newcombe (Australia) Fred Stolle	(Australia) John Alexander (Australia) Ken Rosewall	7–6, 6–4
1974	(South Africa) Raymond Moore (New Zealand) Onny Parun	(Spain) Juan Gisbert (United Kingdom) Roger Taylor	4–6, 6–2, 6–4
1975	(United States) Bob Lutz (United States) Stan Smith	(Australia) John Alexander (Australia) Phil Dent	6–4, 6–7^{(6–8)}, 6–2
