= 1974 São Paulo WCT =

- Date: 11–17 March
- Edition: 1st
- Category: World Championship Tennis (WCT)
- Draw: 32S / 16D
- Prize money: $50,000
- Surface: Carpet / indoor
- Location: São Paulo, Brazil

Champions

Singles
- (Sweden) Björn Borg

Doubles
- (Italy) Adriano Panatta / (Romania) Ion Țiriac
São Paulo WCT	· 1975 →

The 1974 São Paulo WCT, also known as the São Paulo Tennis Classic, was a men's tennis tournament played on indoor carpet courts in São Paulo, Brazil. The tournament was part of Green Group of the 1974 World Championship Tennis circuit. It was the inaugural edition of the event and was held from 11 March through 17 March 1974. Second-seeded Björn Borg won the singles title and earned $10,000 first-prize money.

== Finals ==
=== Singles ===
(Sweden) Björn Borg defeated (United States) Arthur Ashe 6–2, 3–6, 6–3

- It was Borg's 3rd singles title of the year and of his career.

=== Doubles ===
(Italy) Adriano Panatta / (Romania) Ion Țiriac defeated (Sweden) Ove Nils Bengtson / (Sweden) Björn Borg 7–5, 3–6, 6–3

- It was Panatta's 2nd and last doubles title of the year and the 4th of his career. It was Țiriac's only doubles title of the year and the 13th of his career.
