= 1974 ABN World Tennis Tournament – Doubles =

Doubles
- 1974 ABN World Tennis Tournament

Final
- Champion: (South Africa) Bob Hewitt (South Africa) Frew McMillan
- Runner-up: (France) Pierre Barthès (Romania) Ilie Năstase
- Score: 3–6, 6–4, 6–3

Details
- Draw: 16
- Seeds: 4

Events
Singles	Doubles
- ABN World Tennis Tournament

The 1974 ABN World Tennis Tournament – Doubles was an event of the 1974 ABN World Tennis Tournament men's tennis tournament that was played at Rotterdam Ahoy in Rotterdam, Netherlands from 25 March through 31 March 1974. The draw comprised 16 teams of which four were seeded. Roy Emerson and John Newcombe were the defending doubles champions but did not compete in this edition. Third-seeded Bob Hewitt and Frew McMillan won the doubles title, defeating unseeded Pierre Barthès and Ilie Năstase in the final, 3–6, 6–4, 6–3.

== Seeds ==
1. (Netherlands) Tom Okker / (United States) Marty Riessen (first round)
2. (Australia) John Alexander / (Australia) Phil Dent (first round)
3. (South Africa) Bob Hewitt / (South Africa) Frew McMillan (champions)
4. (Socialist Federal Republic of Yugoslavia) Nikola Pilić / (Australia) Allan Stone (quarterfinals)

== Draw ==
Key

- Q = Qualifier
- WC = Wild card
- LL = Lucky loser
- Alt = Alternate
- ITF = ITF entry
- PR = Protected ranking
- SR = Special ranking
- SE = Special exempt
- JE = Junior exempt
- JR = Junior Accelerator Programme entrant
- CO = College Accelerator Programme entrant
- NG = Next Gen Accelerator Program entrant
- w/o = Walkover
- r = Retired
- d = Defaulted

First Round
2	(Australia) John Alexander (Australia) Phil Dent	6	7	5
(France) Pierre Barthès (Romania) Ilie Năstase	7	6	7
(France) Jean-Baptiste Chanfreau (France) Georges Goven	3	6
(United States) Mike Estep (Netherlands) Wouter Fok	6	7
(Spain) Manuel Orantes (Australia) Tony Roche	6	6
(Netherlands) Nick Fleury (Netherlands) Jan Hordijk	4	4
(France) Patrice Dominguez (France) Patrick Proisy
4	(Socialist Federal Republic of Yugoslavia) Nikola Pilić (Australia) Allan Stone	w/o
3	(South Africa) Bob Hewitt (South Africa) Frew McMillan	6	6
(Netherlands) Louk Sanders (Netherlands) Rolf Thung	3	3
(Australia) Bob Carmichael (Australia) Ray Ruffels	6	6	2
(United States) Jim McManus (Rhodesia) Andrew Pattison	3	7	6
(United States) Tom Gorman (United States) Erik van Dillen	7	7
(West Germany) Harald Elschenbroich (West Germany) Hans-Jürgen Pohmann	5	5
(South Africa) Cliff Drysdale (South Africa) Bob Maud	6	6
1	(Netherlands) Tom Okker (United States) Marty Riessen	4	4

Quarterfinals
(France) Pierre Barthès (Romania) Ilie Năstase	6	7
(United States) Mike Estep (Netherlands) Wouter Fok	2	6
(Spain) Manuel Orantes (Australia) Tony Roche	7	6
4	(Socialist Federal Republic of Yugoslavia) Nikola Pilić (Australia) Allan Stone	6	3
3	(South Africa) Bob Hewitt (South Africa) Frew McMillan	6	6
(United States) Jim McManus (Rhodesia) Andrew Pattison	4	4
(United States) Tom Gorman (United States) Erik van Dillen	3	6	6
(South Africa) Cliff Drysdale (South Africa) Bob Maud	6	3	0

Semifinals
(France) Pierre Barthès (Romania) Ilie Năstase	6	6
(Spain) Manuel Orantes (Australia) Tony Roche	2	2
3	(South Africa) Bob Hewitt (South Africa) Frew McMillan	6	6
(United States) Tom Gorman (United States) Erik van Dillen	3	3

Final
(France) Pierre Barthès (Romania) Ilie Năstase	6	4	3
3	(South Africa) Bob Hewitt (South Africa) Frew McMillan	3	6	6
