= 1974 ABN World Tennis Tournament – Singles =

Singles
- 1974 ABN World Tennis Tournament

Final
- Champion: (Netherlands) Tom Okker
- Runner-up: (United States) Tom Gorman
- Score: 6–3, 6–4

Details
- Draw: 32
- Seeds: 8

Events
Singles	Doubles
- ABN World Tennis Tournament

Arthur Ashe was the defending champion of the singles event at the ABN World Tennis Tournament, but did not participate in this edition.

Second-seeded Tom Okker won the title, defeating Third-seeded Tom Gorman in the final, 6–3, 6–4.

== Seeds ==
1. (Romania) Ilie Năstase (second round)
2. (Netherlands) Tom Okker (champion)
3. (United States) Tom Gorman (final)
4. (South Africa) Cliff Drysdale (semifinals)
5. (Australia) Tony Roche (second round)
6. (West Germany) Nikola Pilić (quarterfinals)
7. (Australia) John Alexander (first round)
8. (United States) Marty Riessen (quarterfinals)

== Draw ==
=== Finals ===
Semifinals
2	(Netherlands) Tom Okker	6	3	6
4	(South Africa) Cliff Drysdale	3	6	3
3	(United States) Tom Gorman	6	6
(West Germany) Hans-Jürgen Pohmann	2	3

Final
2	(Netherlands) Tom Okker	6	6
3	(United States) Tom Gorman	3	4

==== Upper half ====
First round
2	(Netherlands) Tom Okker	6	6
(United States) Mike Estep	3	4
(France) Georges Goven	6^{6}	6	7
(Australia) Phil Dent	7	4	5
(United States) Andrew Pattison	6	6
(West Germany) Harald Elschenbroich	1	2
(France) Jean-Baptiste Chanfreau	3	4
8	(United States) Marty Riessen	6	6
6	(Socialist Federal Republic of Yugoslavia) Nikola Pilić	2	7	6
(United States) Jim McManus	6	6^{6}	3
(Netherlands) Jan Hordijk	6	3	2
(United States) Erik van Dillen	4	6	6
(South Africa) Bob Hewitt	6	6
(Australia) Bob Carmichael	4	3
(South Africa) Frew McMillan	5	4
4	(South Africa) Cliff Drysdale	7	6

Second round
2	(Netherlands) Tom Okker	6	3	6
(France) Georges Goven	0	6	1
(United States) Andrew Pattison	3	7	3
8	(United States) Marty Riessen	6	5	6
6	(Socialist Federal Republic of Yugoslavia) Nikola Pilić	1	7	6
(United States) Erik van Dillen	6	6^{6}	3
(South Africa) Bob Hewitt	1	1
4	(South Africa) Cliff Drysdale	6	6

Quarterfinals
2	(Netherlands) Tom Okker	6	6
8	(United States) Marty Riessen	4	1
6	(Socialist Federal Republic of Yugoslavia) Nikola Pilić	2	4
4	(South Africa) Cliff Drysdale	6	6

Semifinals
2	(Netherlands) Tom Okker	6	3	6
4	(South Africa) Cliff Drysdale	3	6	3

==== Lower half ====
First round
3	(United States) Tom Gorman	w/o
(France) Patrick Proisy
(Australia) Ray Ruffels	7	7
(South Africa) Robert Maud	5	6^{5}
(Spain) Manuel Orantes	6	6
(Netherlands) Nick Fleury	3	3
(France) Patrice Dominguez	3	6	1
5	(Australia) Tony Roche	6	4	6
7	(Australia) John Alexander	6^{4}	4
(Netherlands) Rolf Thung	7	6
(Netherlands) Louk Sanders	6^{4}	4
(France) Pierre Barthès	7	6
(West Germany) Hans-Jürgen Pohmann	6	6
(Netherlands) Wouter Fok	3	4
(Australia) Allan Stone	6	1	7
1	(Romania) Ilie Năstase	3	6	5

Second round
3	(United States) Tom Gorman	6	6
(Australia) Ray Ruffels	4	2
(Spain) Manuel Orantes	6	3	6
5	(Australia) Tony Roche	4	6	3
(Netherlands) Rolf Thung	6	3	4
(France) Pierre Barthès	3	6	6
(West Germany) Hans-Jürgen Pohmann	6	6
(Australia) Allan Stone	2	2

Quarterfinals
3	(United States) Tom Gorman	7	6
(Spain) Manuel Orantes	6^{5}	4
(France) Pierre Barthès	1	4
(West Germany) Hans-Jürgen Pohmann	6	6

Semifinals
3	(United States) Tom Gorman	6	6
(West Germany) Hans-Jürgen Pohmann	2	3
