= 1972 Tokyo WCT =

- Date: 4–7 October
- Edition: 1st
- Category: World Championship Tennis (WCT)
- Draw: 32S / 16D
- Prize money: $33,000
- Surface: Hard / indoor
- Location: Tokyo, Japan
- Venue: National Tennis Stadium

Champions

Singles
- (Australia) Ken Rosewall

Doubles
- (Australia) John Newcombe / (Australia) Fred Stolle
Tokyo WCT	· 1974 →

The 1972 Tokyo WCT, was a men's tennis tournament played on indoor hard courts at the National Tennis Stadium in Tokyo, Japan that was part of the 1972 World Championship Tennis circuit. It was the inaugural edition of the tournament and was held from 4 October through 7 October 1972. Ken Rosewall won the singles title and the accompanying $10,000 first prize money.

== Finals ==
=== Singles ===
(Australia) Ken Rosewall defeated (Australia) Fred Stolle 7–5, 6–3, 6–3

=== Doubles ===
(Australia) John Newcombe / (Australia) Fred Stolle defeated (Australia) John Alexander / (Australia) Ken Rosewall 7–6, 6–4
