= 1975 Tokyo WCT =

- Date: 14–20 April
- Edition: 3rd
- Category: World Championship Tennis (WCT)
- Draw: 32S / 16D
- Prize money: $60,000
- Surface: Carpet
- Location: Tokyo, Japan

Champions

Singles
- (United States) Bob Lutz

Doubles
- (United States) Bob Lutz / (United States) Stan Smith
- Tokyo WCT

The 1975 Tokyo WCT, also known by its sponsored name Kawasaki Tennis Classic, was a men's tennis tournament played on indoor carpet courts in Tokyo, Japan. The event was part of the Red Group of the 1975 World Championship Tennis circuit. It was the third and final edition of the tournament and was held from 14 April through 20 April 1975. Seventh-seeded Bob Lutz won the singles title.

== Finals ==
=== Singles ===
(United States) Bob Lutz defeated (United States) Stan Smith 6–4, 6–4

- It was Lutz' 1st singles title of the year and the 6th of his career.

=== Doubles ===
(United States) Bob Lutz / (United States) Stan Smith defeated (Australia) John Alexander / (Australia) Phil Dent 6–4, 6–7^{(6–8)}, 6–2
