= Wouter Fok =

Dutch tennis player

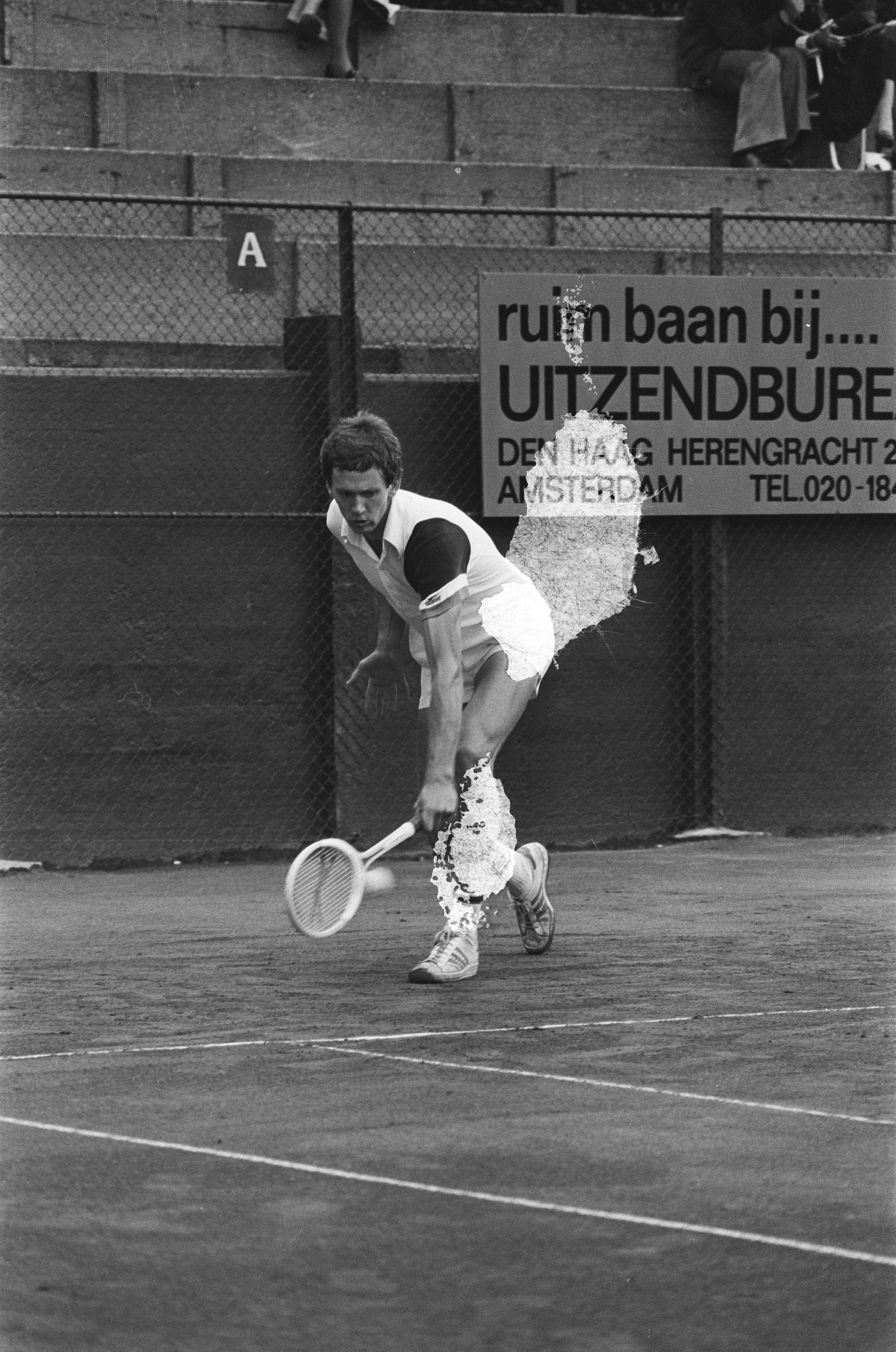
- Country (sports): Netherlands
- Born: 30 September 1954 (age 70)
- Plays: Left-handed

Singles
- Career record: 1–3
- Highest ranking: No. 314 (3 Jan 1979)

Doubles
- Career record: 2–4

Wouter Fok (born 30 September 1954) is a Dutch former professional tennis player.

A five-time national doubles champion, Fok debuted for the Netherlands Davis Cup team against Greece in 1977 and secured the tie with a reverse singles win over Nikolaos Kelaidis. He also featured against Norway in 1978.

Fok, a left-handed player, twice featured in the singles main draw of the ABN World Tennis Tournament. In 1978 he had an upset win over Dutch number one Tom Okker at a tournament in Mook.

== See also ==
- List of Netherlands Davis Cup team representatives
