= 1978 Grand Prix (tennis) =

Tennis circuit

1978 Grand Prix circuit
Details
- Duration: 9 January 1978 – 24 December 1978
- Edition: 9th
- Tournaments: 84
- Categories: Grand Slam (4); Grand Prix (71); World Championship Tennis (8); Team Events (1)

Achievements (singles)
- Most titles: (United States) Jimmy Connors (10)
- Most finals: (United States) Jimmy Connors (12)
- Prize money leader: (United States) Eddie Dibbs ($575,273)
- Points leader: (United States) Jimmy Connors (2,030)

Awards
- Player of the year: (Sweden) Björn Borg
- Newcomer of the year: (United States) John McEnroe

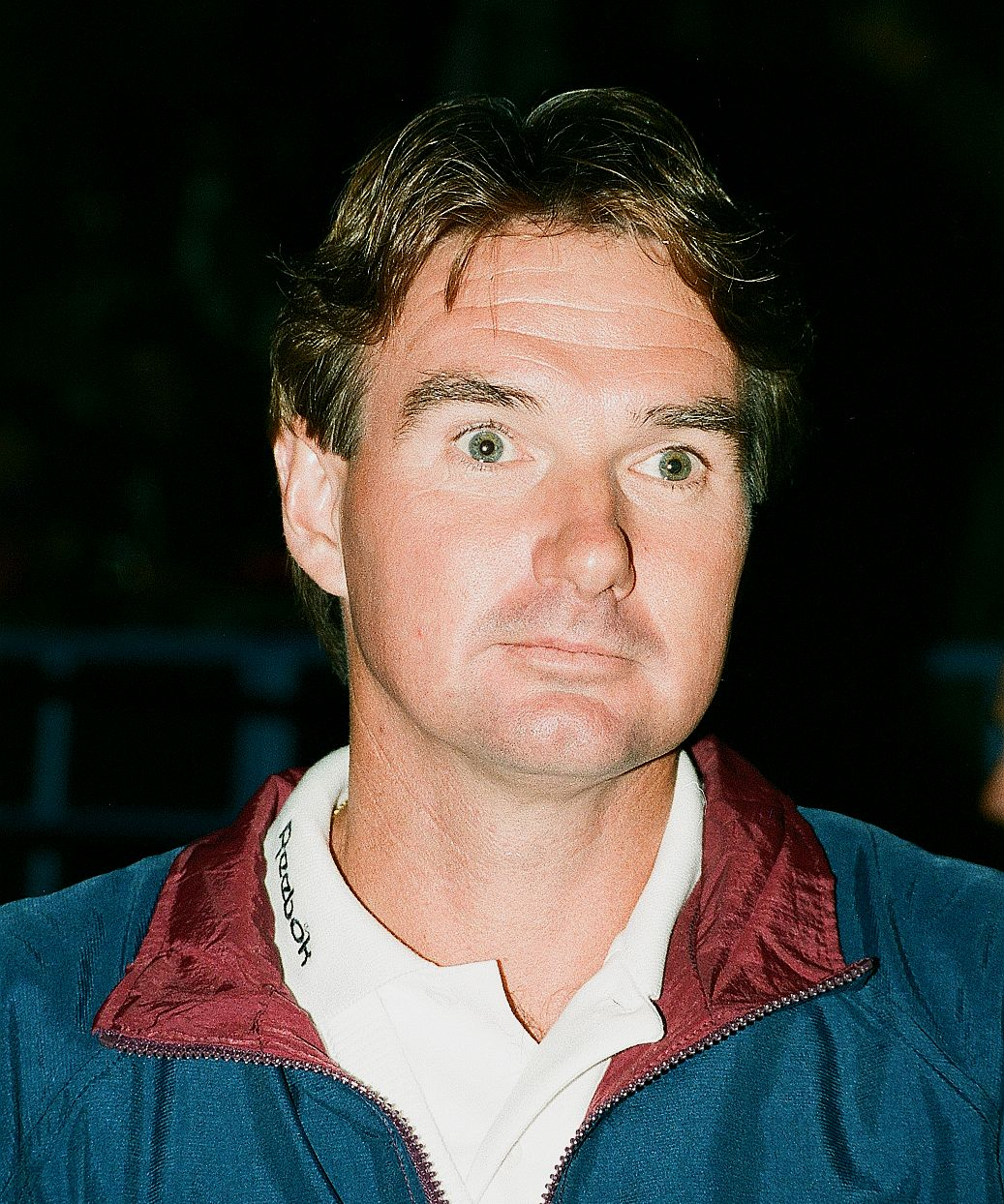
Jimmy Connors finished the year as ATP world No. 1 for the fifth time in his career. Connors won ten tournaments during the season, including a major at the US Open, and finished runner-up at another major at the Wimbledon Championships.

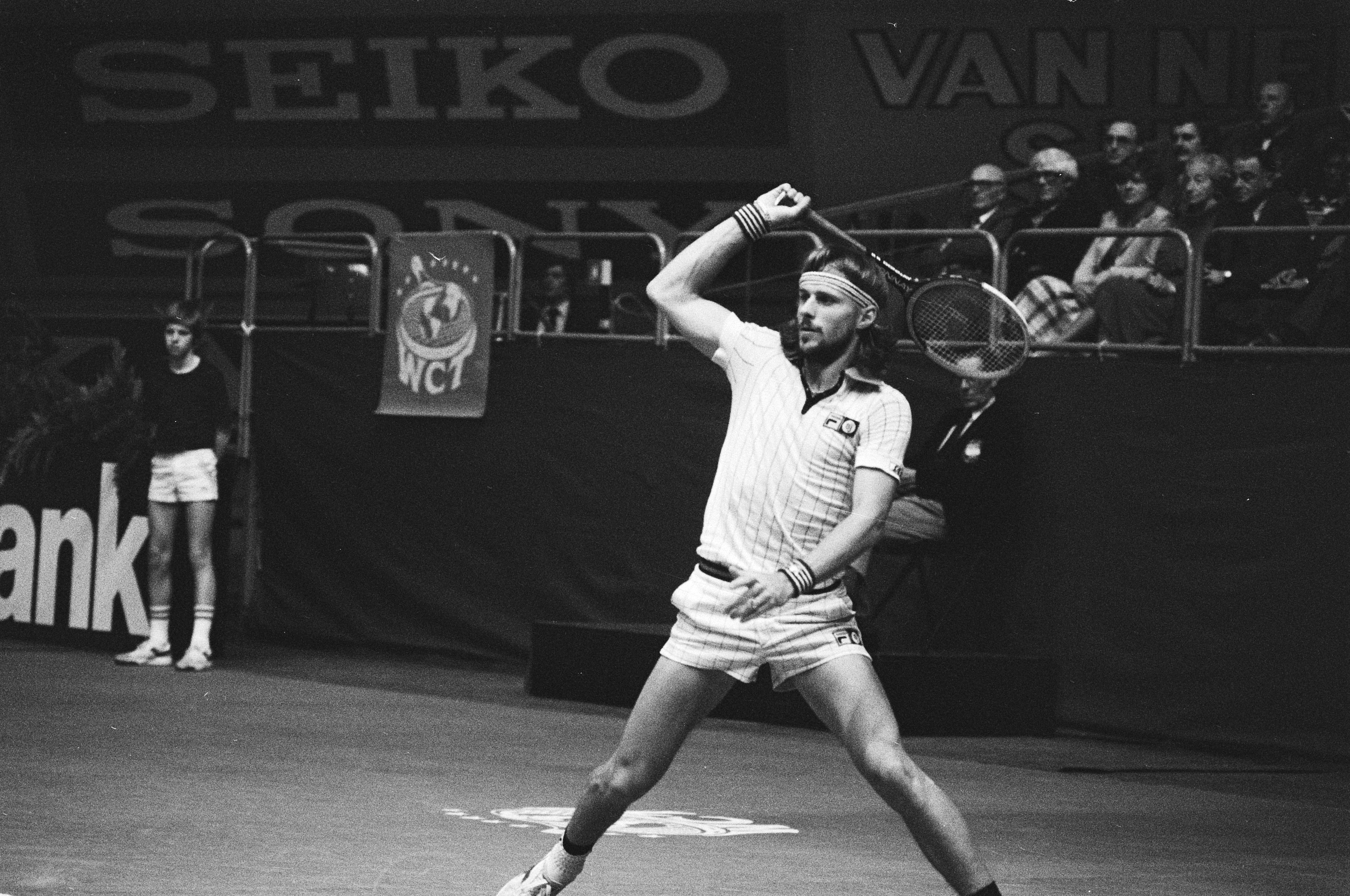
Björn Borg was named the ATP Player of the Year. Borg won nine tournaments during the season, including two majors at the French Open and the Wimbledon Championships, and finished runner-up at another major at the US Open.

The 1978 Colgate-Palmolive Grand Prix was a professional tennis circuit held that year. It consisted of four Grand Slam tournaments, the Grand Prix tournaments and the Nations Cup, a team event. In addition eight World Championship Tennis (WCT) tournaments, a separate professional tennis circuit held from 1971 through 1977, were incorporated into the Grand Prix circuit. The 28 tournaments with prize money of $175,000 or more formed the Super Series category. Jimmy Connors won 10 of the 84 tournaments which secured him the first place in the Grand Prix points ranking. However he did not play enough tournaments (13) to qualify for largest share ($300,000) of the bonus pool, which instead went to third–ranked Eddie Dibbs.

== Schedule ==
The table below shows the 1978 Colgate-Palmolive Grand Prix schedule (a forerunner to the ATP Tour).

Key

Grand Slam tournaments
Tour finals
Super Series
Regular Series

=== January ===
| Week | Tournament | Champions | Runners-up | Semifinalists | Quarterfinalists |
|---|---|---|---|---|---|
| 9 Jan | Birmingham WCT; Birmingham, Alabama, US; Super Series; Carpet (i) $175,000 – 32S/16D | (Sweden) Björn Borg; 7–6^{(7–4)}, 7–5 | (United States) Dick Stockton | (United States) Vitas Gerulaitis (United States) Eddie Dibbs | (United States) Roscoe Tanner (Mexico) Raúl Ramírez (United States) Terry Moor (United States) Brian Gottfried |
| 9 Jan | Birmingham WCT; Birmingham, Alabama, US; Super Series; Carpet (i) $175,000 – 32S/16D | (United States) Vitas Gerulaitis (United States) Sandy Mayer; 3–6, 6–1, 7–6 | (South Africa) Frew McMillan (United States) Dick Stockton | (United States) Vitas Gerulaitis (United States) Eddie Dibbs | (United States) Roscoe Tanner (Mexico) Raúl Ramírez (United States) Terry Moor (United States) Brian Gottfried |
| 16 Jan | Pepsi Grand Slam; Boca Raton, Florida, US; Clay – 4S | (Sweden) Björn Borg; 7–6^{(7–1)}, 3–6, 6–1 | (United States) Jimmy Connors | (United States) Brian Gottfried (United States) Vitas Gerulaitis | |
| 23 Jan | US Pro Indoor WCT; Philadelphia, Pennsylvania, US; Super Series; Carpet (i) $225,000 – 64S/32D; Singles – Doubles | (United States) Jimmy Connors; 6–2, 6–4, 6–3 | (United States) Roscoe Tanner | (United States) Brian Gottfried (United States) Eddie Dibbs | (Mexico) Raúl Ramírez (United States) John McEnroe (United States) Sandy Mayer (Sweden) Björn Borg |
| 23 Jan | US Pro Indoor WCT; Philadelphia, Pennsylvania, US; Super Series; Carpet (i) $225,000 – 64S/32D; Singles – Doubles | (South Africa) Frew McMillan (South Africa) Bob Hewitt; 6–4, 6–4 | (United States) Vitas Gerulaitis (United States) Sandy Mayer | (United States) Brian Gottfried (United States) Eddie Dibbs | (Mexico) Raúl Ramírez (United States) John McEnroe (United States) Sandy Mayer (Sweden) Björn Borg |
| 23 Jan | Sarasota, Florida, US; Carpet (i) – $50,000 – 32S/16D | (Czechoslovakia) Tomáš Šmíd; 7–6, 0–6, 7–5 | (United States) Nick Saviano | (United States) Pat DuPré (South Africa) John Yuill | (Australia) Rod Laver (South Africa) Bernard Mitton (Sweden) Ove Nils Bengtson (Czechoslovakia) Jiří Granát |
| 23 Jan | Sarasota, Florida, US; Carpet (i) – $50,000 – 32S/16D | (Australia) Geoff Masters (Switzerland) Colin Dowdeswell; 2–6, 6–3, 6–2 | (South Africa) Byron Bertram (South Africa) Bernard Mitton | (United States) Pat DuPré (South Africa) John Yuill | (Australia) Rod Laver (South Africa) Bernard Mitton (Sweden) Ove Nils Bengtson (Czechoslovakia) Jiří Granát |
| 30 Jan | Mexico City WCT; Mexico City, Mexico; Carpet (i) – $50,000 – 32S/16D | (Mexico) Raúl Ramírez; 6–4, 6–1 | (United States) Pat DuPré | (United States) Gene Mayer (United Kingdom) Roger Taylor | (Australia) Steve Docherty (United States) Peter Pearson (Australia) Ross Case (India) Anand Amritraj |
| 30 Jan | Mexico City WCT; Mexico City, Mexico; Carpet (i) – $50,000 – 32S/16D | (India) Sashi Menon (United States) Gene Mayer; 6–3, 7–6 | (Mexico) Marcelo Lara (Mexico) Raúl Ramírez | (United States) Gene Mayer (United Kingdom) Roger Taylor | (Australia) Steve Docherty (United States) Peter Pearson (Australia) Ross Case (India) Anand Amritraj |
| 30 Jan | United Virginia Bank Classic WCT; Richmond, Virginia, US; Super Series; Carpet (i) $175,000 – 32S/16D | (United States) Vitas Gerulaitis; 7–5, 6–3 | (Australia) John Newcombe | (United States) Eddie Dibbs (Italy) Corrado Barazzutti | (Sweden) Björn Borg (Australia) Rod Laver (United States) Peter Fleming (Australia) Ken Rosewall |
| 30 Jan | United Virginia Bank Classic WCT; Richmond, Virginia, US; Super Series; Carpet (i) $175,000 – 32S/16D | (South Africa) Frew McMillan (South Africa) Bob Hewitt; 6–3, 7–5 | (United States) Vitas Gerulaitis (United States) Sandy Mayer | (United States) Eddie Dibbs (Italy) Corrado Barazzutti | (Sweden) Björn Borg (Australia) Rod Laver (United States) Peter Fleming (Australia) Ken Rosewall |
| 30 Jan | Fairfield Bay Classic; Little Rock, Arkansas, US; Hard (i) – $50,000 – 32S/16D | (United States) Dick Stockton; 6–4, 3–5, ret. | (United States) Hank Pfister | (United States) Victor Amaya (South Africa) Byron Bertram | (United States) Nick Saviano (Czechoslovakia) Jiří Hřebec (United States) Charlie Pasarell (United States) Tim Gullikson |
| 30 Jan | Fairfield Bay Classic; Little Rock, Arkansas, US; Hard (i) – $50,000 – 32S/16D | (Australia) Geoff Masters (South Africa) Colin Dibley; 7–6, 6–3 | (United States) Tim Gullikson (United States) Tom Gullikson | (United States) Victor Amaya (South Africa) Byron Bertram | (United States) Nick Saviano (Czechoslovakia) Jiří Hřebec (United States) Charlie Pasarell (United States) Tim Gullikson |

=== February ===
| Week | Tournament | Champions | Runners-up | Semifinalists | Quarterfinalists |
|---|---|---|---|---|---|
| 6 Feb | Springfield, Massachusetts, US; Carpet (i) – $75,000 – 32S/16D | (Switzerland) Heinz Günthardt; 6–3, 3–6, 6–2 | (United States) Harold Solomon | (Czechoslovakia) Tomáš Šmíd (South Africa) Byron Bertram | (United States) Marty Riessen (United States) Robert Lutz (Czechoslovakia) Jan Kodeš (United States) Stan Smith |
| 6 Feb | Springfield, Massachusetts, US; Carpet (i) – $75,000 – 32S/16D | (United States) Stan Smith (United States) Robert Lutz; 6–3, 6–3 | (Czechoslovakia) Jan Kodeš (United States) Marty Riessen | (Czechoslovakia) Tomáš Šmíd (South Africa) Byron Bertram | (United States) Marty Riessen (United States) Robert Lutz (Czechoslovakia) Jan Kodeš (United States) Stan Smith |
| 6 Feb | St. Louis WCT; St. Louis, Missouri, US; Super Series; Carpet (i) $175,000 – 32S/16D | (United States) Sandy Mayer; 7–6, 6–4 | (United States) Eddie Dibbs | (Socialist Federal Republic of Yugoslavia) Željko Franulović (Australia) John Alexander | (Poland) Wojciech Fibak (New Zealand) Chris Lewis (United States) Dick Stockton (Australia) John Newcombe |
| 6 Feb | St. Louis WCT; St. Louis, Missouri, US; Super Series; Carpet (i) $175,000 – 32S/16D | (South Africa) Frew McMillan (South Africa) Bob Hewitt; 6–3, 6–2 | (Poland) Wojciech Fibak (Netherlands) Tom Okker | (Socialist Federal Republic of Yugoslavia) Željko Franulović (Australia) John Alexander | (Poland) Wojciech Fibak (New Zealand) Chris Lewis (United States) Dick Stockton (Australia) John Newcombe |
| 13 Feb | American Airlines Tennis Games; Palm Springs, California, US; Super Series; Hard $225,000 – 64S/32D; Singles – Doubles | (United States) Roscoe Tanner; 6–1, 7–6 | (Mexico) Raúl Ramírez | (United States) Peter Fleming (United States) Tom Leonard | (United States) Brian Gottfried (Romania) Ilie Năstase (Spain) Manuel Orantes (United States) Arthur Ashe |
| 13 Feb | American Airlines Tennis Games; Palm Springs, California, US; Super Series; Hard $225,000 – 64S/32D; Singles – Doubles | (United States) Roscoe Tanner (South Africa) Raymond Moore; 6–4, 6–4 | (South Africa) Bob Hewitt (South Africa) Frew McMillan | (United States) Peter Fleming (United States) Tom Leonard | (United States) Brian Gottfried (Romania) Ilie Năstase (Spain) Manuel Orantes (United States) Arthur Ashe |
| 20 Feb | United Bank Tennis Classic; Denver, Colorado, US; Carpet (i) – $125,000 – 32S/16D; Singles – Doubles | (United States) Jimmy Connors; 6–2, 7–6^{(7–2)} | (United States) Stan Smith | (Australia) Geoff Masters (United States) Arthur Ashe | (United States) Nick Saviano (United States) Tom Leonard (Poland) Wojciech Fibak (South Africa) Frew McMillan |
| 20 Feb | United Bank Tennis Classic; Denver, Colorado, US; Carpet (i) – $125,000 – 32S/16D; Singles – Doubles | (South Africa) Frew McMillan (South Africa) Bob Hewitt; 6–3, 6–2 | (United States) Fred McNair (United States) Sherwood Stewart | (Australia) Geoff Masters (United States) Arthur Ashe | (United States) Nick Saviano (United States) Tom Leonard (Poland) Wojciech Fibak (South Africa) Frew McMillan |
| 27 Feb | U.S. National Indoor Championships; Memphis, Tennessee, US; Super Series; Carpet (i) $225,000 – 32S/16D | (United States) Jimmy Connors; 7–6, 6–3 | (United States) Tim Gullikson | (Spain) José Higueras (United States) Sandy Mayer | (United Kingdom) Mark Cox (United Kingdom) John Lloyd (United States) Eddie Dibbs (United States) Robert Lutz |
| 27 Feb | U.S. National Indoor Championships; Memphis, Tennessee, US; Super Series; Carpet (i) $225,000 – 32S/16D | (Mexico) Raúl Ramírez (United States) Brian Gottfried; 3–6, 7–6, 6–2 | (Australia) Phil Dent (Australia) John Newcombe | (Spain) José Higueras (United States) Sandy Mayer | (United Kingdom) Mark Cox (United Kingdom) John Lloyd (United States) Eddie Dibbs (United States) Robert Lutz |
| 27 Feb | Miami, Florida, US; Carpet (i) – $50,000 – 32S/16D | (Romania) Ilie Năstase; 6–3, 7–5 | (United States) Tom Gullikson | (Australia) Dick Crealy (United States) Brian Teacher | (Sweden) Björn Borg (India) Anand Amritraj (United States) Cliff Richey (United States) Van Winitsky |
| 27 Feb | Miami, Florida, US; Carpet (i) – $50,000 – 32S/16D | (United States) Gene Mayer (United States) Tom Gullikson; 7–6, 6–3 | (Australia) Bob Carmichael (United States) Brian Teacher | (Australia) Dick Crealy (United States) Brian Teacher | (Sweden) Björn Borg (India) Anand Amritraj (United States) Cliff Richey (United States) Van Winitsky |
| 27 Feb | Lagos Classic; Lagos, Nigeria; Hard – $50,000 – 32S/16D | (Sweden) Kjell Johansson; 9–8, 6–3 | (United Kingdom) Robin Drysdale | (India) Sashi Menon (Egypt) Ismail El Shafei | (France) Bernard Fritz (Sweden) Tenny Svensson (Rhodesia) Roger Dowdeswell (West Germany) Jürgen Fassbender |
| 27 Feb | Lagos Classic; Lagos, Nigeria; Hard – $50,000 – 32S/16D | (India) Sashi Menon (United States) George Hardie; 6–3, 3–6, 7–5 | (Switzerland) Colin Dowdeswell (West Germany) Jürgen Fassbender | (India) Sashi Menon (Egypt) Ismail El Shafei | (France) Bernard Fritz (Sweden) Tenny Svensson (Rhodesia) Roger Dowdeswell (West Germany) Jürgen Fassbender |

=== March ===
| Week | Tournament | Champions | Runners-up | Semifinalists | Quarterfinalists |
|---|---|---|---|---|---|
| 6 Mar | Cairo Open; Cairo, Egypt; Clay – $38,000 – 16S/8D | (Spain) José Higueras; 4–6, 6–4, 6–4 | (Sweden) Kjell Johansson | (West Germany) Jürgen Fassbender (France) Éric Deblicker | (France) Patrice Dominguez (France) François Jauffret (United States) George Hardie (Socialist Federal Republic of Yugoslavia) Nicola Spear |
| 6 Mar | Cairo Open; Cairo, Egypt; Clay – $38,000 – 16S/8D | (Australia) Brian Fairlie (Egypt) Ismail El Shafei; 6–3, 7–5, 6–2 | (Argentina) Lito Alvárez (United States) George Hardie | (West Germany) Jürgen Fassbender (France) Éric Deblicker | (France) Patrice Dominguez (France) François Jauffret (United States) George Hardie (Socialist Federal Republic of Yugoslavia) Nicola Spear |
| 13 Mar | Volvo Tennis Classic; Washington, D.C., US; Carpet (i) – $125,000 – 32S/16D | (United States) Brian Gottfried; 7–5, 7–6^{(7–4)} | (Mexico) Raúl Ramírez | (Spain) Manuel Orantes (United States) Roscoe Tanner | (United States) Stan Smith (United States) John McEnroe (United States) Tim Gullikson (United States) Brian Teacher |
| 13 Mar | Volvo Tennis Classic; Washington, D.C., US; Carpet (i) – $125,000 – 32S/16D | (United States) Stan Smith (United States) Robert Lutz; 6–7, 7–5, 6–1 | (United States) Arthur Ashe (United States) John McEnroe | (Spain) Manuel Orantes (United States) Roscoe Tanner | (United States) Stan Smith (United States) John McEnroe (United States) Tim Gullikson (United States) Brian Teacher |
| 27 Mar | Ramazzotti Cup WCT; Milan, Italy; Super Series; Carpet (i) – $175,000 – 32S/16D; Singles – Doubles | (Sweden) Björn Borg; 6–3, 6–3 | (United States) Vitas Gerulaitis | (United States) Stan Smith (United States) Sandy Mayer | (Italy) Adriano Panatta (Italy) Gianni Ocleppo (United States) Robert Lutz (Spain) José Higueras |
| 27 Mar | Ramazzotti Cup WCT; Milan, Italy; Super Series; Carpet (i) – $175,000 – 32S/16D; Singles – Doubles | (Paraguay) Víctor Pecci (Spain) José Higueras; 5–7, 7–6, 7–6 | (Poland) Wojciech Fibak (Mexico) Raúl Ramírez | (United States) Stan Smith (United States) Sandy Mayer | (Italy) Adriano Panatta (Italy) Gianni Ocleppo (United States) Robert Lutz (Spain) José Higueras |
| 27 Mar | Dayton Pro Tennis Classic; Dayton, Ohio, US; Carpet (i) – $75,000 – 32S/16D | (United States) Brian Gottfried; 2–6, 6–4, 7–6^{(7–4)} | (United States) Eddie Dibbs | (United States) Arthur Ashe (United States) Harold Solomon | (United States) Tom Gullikson (United States) Arthur Ashe (United States) Hank Pfister (Australia) Dick Crealy |
| 27 Mar | Dayton Pro Tennis Classic; Dayton, Ohio, US; Carpet (i) – $75,000 – 32S/16D | (Australia) Geoff Masters (United States) Brian Gottfried; 6–3, 6–4 | (United States) Hank Pfister (United States) Butch Walts | (United States) Arthur Ashe (United States) Harold Solomon | (United States) Tom Gullikson (United States) Arthur Ashe (United States) Hank Pfister (Australia) Dick Crealy |

=== April ===
| Week | Tournament | Champions | Runners-up | Semifinalists | Quarterfinalists |
|---|---|---|---|---|---|
| 3 Apr | Johannesburg, South Africa; Hard – $75,000 – 32S/16D | (United States) Cliff Richey; 7–5, 7–6 | (Switzerland) Colin Dowdeswell | (Argentina) Guillermo Vilas (South Africa) Bernard Mitton | (France) Éric Deblicker (Australia) Colin Dibley (France) Yannick Noah (South Africa) Frew McMillan |
| 3 Apr | Johannesburg, South Africa; Hard – $75,000 – 32S/16D | (South Africa) Frew McMillan (South Africa) Bob Hewitt; 7–5, 7–6 | (Australia) Colin Dibley (Australia) Geoff Masters | (Argentina) Guillermo Vilas (South Africa) Bernard Mitton | (France) Éric Deblicker (Australia) Colin Dibley (France) Yannick Noah (South Africa) Frew McMillan |
| 3 Apr | ABN World Tennis Tournament WCT; Rotterdam, Netherlands; Super Series; Carpet (i) – $175,000 – 32S/16D; Singles – Doubles | (United States) Jimmy Connors; 7–5, 7–5 | (Mexico) Raúl Ramírez | (United States) Vitas Gerulaitis (Romania) Ilie Năstase | (United States) Dick Stockton (United States) Robert Lutz (Australia) Kim Warwick (Sweden) Björn Borg |
| 3 Apr | ABN World Tennis Tournament WCT; Rotterdam, Netherlands; Super Series; Carpet (i) – $175,000 – 32S/16D; Singles – Doubles | (Mexico) Raúl Ramírez (United States) Fred McNair; 6–2, 6–3 | (United States) Robert Lutz (United States) Stan Smith | (United States) Vitas Gerulaitis (Romania) Ilie Năstase | (United States) Dick Stockton (United States) Robert Lutz (Australia) Kim Warwick (Sweden) Björn Borg |
| 10 Apr | Monte Carlo WCT; Roquebrune-Cap-Martin, France; Super Series; Clay – $175,000 – 32S/16D | (Mexico) Raúl Ramírez; 6–3, 6–3, 6–4 | (Czechoslovakia) Tomáš Šmíd | (United States) Vitas Gerulaitis (Italy) Corrado Barazzutti | (Argentina) Guillermo Vilas (Romania) Ilie Năstase (Spain) Manuel Orantes (Italy) Adriano Panatta |
| 10 Apr | Monte Carlo WCT; Roquebrune-Cap-Martin, France; Super Series; Clay – $175,000 – 32S/16D | (Czechoslovakia) Tomáš Šmíd (United States) Peter Fleming; 6–4, 7–5 | (Chile) Jaime Fillol (Romania) Ilie Năstase | (United States) Vitas Gerulaitis (Italy) Corrado Barazzutti | (Argentina) Guillermo Vilas (Romania) Ilie Năstase (Spain) Manuel Orantes (Italy) Adriano Panatta |
| 10 Apr | Guadalajara Open; Guadalajara, Mexico; Clay – $50,000 – 32S/16D | (United States) Gene Mayer; 6–3, 6–4 | (Australia) John Newcombe | (United States) Sandy Mayer (Ecuador) Ricardo Ycaza | (United States) George Hardie (Mexico) Marcelo Lara (Australia) Ray Ruffels (United States) Sherwood Stewart |
| 10 Apr | Guadalajara Open; Guadalajara, Mexico; Clay – $50,000 – 32S/16D | (United States) Sherwood Stewart (United States) Sandy Mayer; 4–6, 7–6, 6–3 | (United States) Gene Mayer (India) Sashi Menon | (United States) Sandy Mayer (Ecuador) Ricardo Ycaza | (United States) George Hardie (Mexico) Marcelo Lara (Australia) Ray Ruffels (United States) Sherwood Stewart |
| 17 Apr | Houston WCT; Houston, Texas, US; Clay – $175,000 – 32S/16D | (United States) Brian Gottfried; 3–6, 6–2, 6–1 | (Romania) Ilie Năstase | (Italy) Corrado Barazzutti (Socialist Federal Republic of Yugoslavia) Željko Franulović | (United States) Jeff Borowiak (Chile) Hans Gildemeister (United States) Harold Solomon (Chile) Jaime Fillol |
| 17 Apr | Houston WCT; Houston, Texas, US; Clay – $175,000 – 32S/16D | (Netherlands) Tom Okker (Poland) Wojciech Fibak; 7–5, 7–5 | (United States) Tom Leonard (United States) Mike Machette | (Italy) Corrado Barazzutti (Socialist Federal Republic of Yugoslavia) Željko Franulović | (United States) Jeff Borowiak (Chile) Hans Gildemeister (United States) Harold Solomon (Chile) Jaime Fillol |
| 17 Apr | Nice International Open; Nice, France; Clay – $50,000 – 32S/16D | (Spain) José Higueras; 6–3, 6–4, 6–4 | (France) Yannick Noah | (France) Patrick Proisy (New Zealand) Chris Lewis | (Argentina) José Luis Clerc (Czechoslovakia) Tomáš Šmíd (Czechoslovakia) Pavel Huťka (Czechoslovakia) Jiří Hřebec |
| 17 Apr | Nice International Open; Nice, France; Clay – $50,000 – 32S/16D | (France) François Jauffret (France) Patrice Dominguez; 6–4, 6–0 | (Czechoslovakia) Jan Kodeš (Czechoslovakia) Tomáš Šmíd | (France) Patrick Proisy (New Zealand) Chris Lewis | (Argentina) José Luis Clerc (Czechoslovakia) Tomáš Šmíd (Czechoslovakia) Pavel Huťka (Czechoslovakia) Jiří Hřebec |
| 17 Apr | San Jose, California, US; Carpet (i) – $50,000 – 32S/16D | (United States) Arthur Ashe; 6–7, 6–1, 6–2 | (South Africa) Bernard Mitton | (United States) John McEnroe (United States) Roscoe Tanner | (United States) Trey Waltke (United States) Erik van Dillen (United States) Eliot Teltscher (South Africa) Byron Bertram |
| 17 Apr | San Jose, California, US; Carpet (i) – $50,000 – 32S/16D | (United States) Sandy Mayer (United States) Gene Mayer; 6–3, 6–4 | (United States) Hank Pfister (United States) Brad Rowe | (United States) John McEnroe (United States) Roscoe Tanner | (United States) Trey Waltke (United States) Erik van Dillen (United States) Eliot Teltscher (South Africa) Byron Bertram |
| 24 Apr | Alan King Tennis Classic; Las Vegas, Nevada, US; Super Series; Hard – $250,000 – 32S/16D; Singles | (United States) Harold Solomon; 6–1, 3–0, ret. | (Italy) Corrado Barazzutti | (United States) Hank Pfister (Mexico) Raúl Ramírez | (United States) Roscoe Tanner (Australia) John Newcombe (Australia) Kim Warwick (United States) Brian Gottfried |
| 24 Apr | Alan King Tennis Classic; Las Vegas, Nevada, US; Super Series; Hard – $250,000 – 32S/16D; Singles | (Chile) Álvaro Fillol (Chile) Jaime Fillol; 6–3, 7–6 | (South Africa) Bob Hewitt (Mexico) Raúl Ramírez | (United States) Hank Pfister (Mexico) Raúl Ramírez | (United States) Roscoe Tanner (Australia) John Newcombe (Australia) Kim Warwick (United States) Brian Gottfried |
| 24 Apr | Bank of Oklahoma Grand Prix; Tulsa, Oklahoma, US; Hard – $50,000 – 32S/16D | (United States) Eddie Dibbs; 6–7, 6–2, 7–5 | (United States) Pat DuPré | (Australia) John James (Australia) Steve Docherty | (United States) Bruce Manson (Brazil) Carlos Kirmayr (United States) Pancho Walthall (United States) Dick Stockton |
| 24 Apr | Bank of Oklahoma Grand Prix; Tulsa, Oklahoma, US; Hard – $50,000 – 32S/16D | (United States) Van Winitsky (New Zealand) Russell Simpson; 4–6, 7–6, 6–2 | (Brazil) Carlos Kirmayr (Ecuador) Ricardo Ycaza | (Australia) John James (Australia) Steve Docherty | (United States) Bruce Manson (Brazil) Carlos Kirmayr (United States) Pancho Walthall (United States) Dick Stockton |

=== May ===
| Week | Tournament | Champions | Runners-up | Semifinalists | Quarterfinalists |
|---|---|---|---|---|---|
| 1 May | World Doubles WCT; Kansas City, U.S. Carpet (i) – $200,000 – 8D | (Netherlands) Tom Okker (Poland) Wojciech Fibak; 6–7, 6–4, 6–0, 6–3 | (United States) Robert Lutz (United States) Stan Smith | | |
| 8 May | Nations Cup; Düsseldorf, West Germany; Clay – $200,000 – 8D | Spain; 2–1 | Australia | United States; Italy | |
| 8 May | Dallas WCT Finals; Dallas, Texas, US; Carpet (i) – $200,000 – S8 | (United States) Vitas Gerulaitis; 6–3, 6–2, 6–1 | (United States) Eddie Dibbs | (Sweden) Björn Borg (Italy) Corrado Barazzutti | (United States) Dick Stockton (Mexico) Raúl Ramírez (Romania) Ilie Năstase (United States) Brian Gottfried |
| 15 May | German Open; Hamburg, West Germany; Super Series; Clay – $175,000 – 64S/32D | (Argentina) Guillermo Vilas; 6–2, 6–4, 6–2 | (Poland) Wojciech Fibak | (Spain) Manuel Orantes (United Kingdom) Buster Mottram | (Sweden) Kjell Johansson (Czechoslovakia) Vladimír Zedník (Chile) Hans Gildemeister (Italy) Paolo Bertolucci |
| 15 May | German Open; Hamburg, West Germany; Super Series; Clay – $175,000 – 64S/32D | (Netherlands) Tom Okker (Poland) Wojciech Fibak; 6–2, 6–4 | (Spain) Antonio Muñoz (Paraguay) Víctor Pecci | (Spain) Manuel Orantes (United Kingdom) Buster Mottram | (Sweden) Kjell Johansson (Czechoslovakia) Vladimír Zedník (Chile) Hans Gildemeister (Italy) Paolo Bertolucci |
| 15 May | Alitalia Florence Open; Florence, Italy; Clay – $50,000 – 32S/16D | (Argentina) José Luis Clerc; 6–4, 6–2, 6–1 | (France) Patrice Dominguez | (Spain) Ángel Giménez (Australia) John Alexander | (Czechoslovakia) Jiří Granát (United States) Rick Fagel (Argentina) Lito Alvárez (Ecuador) Ricardo Ycaza |
| 15 May | Alitalia Florence Open; Florence, Italy; Clay – $50,000 – 32S/16D | (Italy) Adriano Panatta (Italy) Corrado Barazzutti; 6–3, 6–7, 6–3 | (Australia) Mark Edmondson (Australia) John Marks | (Spain) Ángel Giménez (Australia) John Alexander | (Czechoslovakia) Jiří Granát (United States) Rick Fagel (Argentina) Lito Alvárez (Ecuador) Ricardo Ycaza |
| 22 May | Italian Open; Rome, Italy; Super Series; Clay – $210,000 – 64S/32D | (Sweden) Björn Borg; 1–6, 6–3, 6–1, 4–6, 6–3 | (Italy) Adriano Panatta | (United States) Eddie Dibbs (Spain) José Higueras | (United States) Harold Solomon (United Kingdom) John Lloyd (Australia) John Alexander (United States) Victor Amaya |
| 22 May | Italian Open; Rome, Italy; Super Series; Clay – $210,000 – 64S/32D | (Chile) Belus Prajoux (Paraguay) Víctor Pecci; 6–7, 7–6, 6–1 | (Czechoslovakia) Jan Kodeš (Czechoslovakia) Tomáš Šmíd | (United States) Eddie Dibbs (Spain) José Higueras | (United States) Harold Solomon (United Kingdom) John Lloyd (Australia) John Alexander (United States) Victor Amaya |
| 22 May | Romika Cup; Munich, West Germany; Clay – $75,000 – 32S/16D; Singles – Doubles | (Argentina) Guillermo Vilas; 6–1, 6–3, 6–3 | (United Kingdom) Buster Mottram | (Hungary) Balázs Taróczy (Socialist Federal Republic of Yugoslavia) Željko Franulović | (Czechoslovakia) Vladimír Zedník (West Germany) Ulrich Pinner (West Germany) Karl Meiler (Brazil) Carlos Kirmayr |
| 22 May | Romika Cup; Munich, West Germany; Clay – $75,000 – 32S/16D; Singles – Doubles | (Argentina) Guillermo Vilas (Romania) Ion Țiriac; 3–6, 6–4, 7–6 | (West Germany) Jürgen Fassbender (Netherlands) Tom Okker | (Hungary) Balázs Taróczy (Socialist Federal Republic of Yugoslavia) Željko Franulović | (Czechoslovakia) Vladimír Zedník (West Germany) Ulrich Pinner (West Germany) Karl Meiler (Brazil) Carlos Kirmayr |
| 29 May; 5 Jun | French Open; Grand Slam; Paris, France; Clay; Singles – Doubles – Mixed doubles | (Sweden) Björn Borg; 6–1, 6–1, 6–3 | (Argentina) Guillermo Vilas | (Italy) Corrado Barazzutti (United States) Dick Stockton | (Mexico) Raúl Ramírez (United States) Eddie Dibbs (Spain) Manuel Orantes (Chile) Hans Gildemeister |
| 29 May; 5 Jun | French Open; Grand Slam; Paris, France; Clay; Singles – Doubles – Mixed doubles | (United States) Gene Mayer (United States) Hank Pfister; 6–3, 6–2, 6–2 | (Spain) José Higueras (Spain) Manuel Orantes | (Italy) Corrado Barazzutti (United States) Dick Stockton | (Mexico) Raúl Ramírez (United States) Eddie Dibbs (Spain) Manuel Orantes (Chile) Hans Gildemeister |
| 29 May; 5 Jun | French Open; Grand Slam; Paris, France; Clay; Singles – Doubles – Mixed doubles | (Czechoslovakia) Renáta Tomanová (Czechoslovakia) Pavel Složil; 7–6, ret. | (Romania) Virginia Ruzici (France) Patrice Dominguez | (Italy) Corrado Barazzutti (United States) Dick Stockton | (Mexico) Raúl Ramírez (United States) Eddie Dibbs (Spain) Manuel Orantes (Chile) Hans Gildemeister |

=== June ===
| Week | Tournament | Champions | Runners-up | Semifinalists | Quarterfinalists |
|---|---|---|---|---|---|
| 12 Jun | Belgian International Championships; Brussels, Belgium; Clay – $50,000 – 32S/16D | (West Germany) Werner Zirngibl; 1–6, 6–3, 6–4, 6–3 | (Argentina) Ricardo Cano | (Italy) Adriano Panatta (Italy) Paolo Bertolucci | (Czechoslovakia) Jiří Granát (West Germany) Jürgen Fassbender (Spain) Antonio Muñoz (France) Éric Deblicker |
| 12 Jun | Belgian International Championships; Brussels, Belgium; Clay – $50,000 – 32S/16D | (Italy) Antonio Zugarelli (France) Jean-Louis Haillet; 6–3, 4–6, 7–5 | (Australia) Onny Parun (Czechoslovakia) Vladimír Zedník | (Italy) Adriano Panatta (Italy) Paolo Bertolucci | (Czechoslovakia) Jiří Granát (West Germany) Jürgen Fassbender (Spain) Antonio Muñoz (France) Éric Deblicker |
| 12 Jun | Birmingham, England; Grass – $125,000 – 64S/32D | (United States) Jimmy Connors; 6–3, 6–1, 6–2 | (Mexico) Raúl Ramírez | (United States) Roscoe Tanner (United States) Brian Gottfried | (Egypt) Ismail El Shafei (Australia) John Newcombe (Chile) Belus Prajoux (South Africa) Bernard Mitton |
| 12 Jun | Birmingham, England; Grass – $125,000 – 64S/32D | (United States) Dick Stockton (United States) Erik van Dillen; 4–6, 6–1, 3–6. 8–6, 6–3 | (Argentina) José Luis Clerc (Chile) Belus Prajoux | (United States) Roscoe Tanner (United States) Brian Gottfried | (Egypt) Ismail El Shafei (Australia) John Newcombe (Chile) Belus Prajoux (South Africa) Bernard Mitton |
| 19 Jun | Queen's Club Championships; London, England; Grass – $125,000 – 64S/32D; Singles – Doubles | (Australia) Tony Roche; 8–6, 9–7 | (United States) John McEnroe | (Australia) Colin Dibley (United States) Sandy Mayer | (Australia) John Alexander (United States) Tom Gullikson (United States) Nick Saviano (United Kingdom) John Lloyd |
| 19 Jun | Queen's Club Championships; London, England; Grass – $125,000 – 64S/32D; Singles – Doubles | (South Africa) Frew McMillan (South Africa) Bob Hewitt; 6–2, 7–5 | (United States) Fred McNair (Mexico) Raúl Ramírez | (Australia) Colin Dibley (United States) Sandy Mayer | (Australia) John Alexander (United States) Tom Gullikson (United States) Nick Saviano (United Kingdom) John Lloyd |
| 19 Jun | Berlin Open; Berlin, West Germany; Clay – $50,000 – 32S/16D | (Czechoslovakia) Vladimír Zedník; 6–4, 7–5, 6–2 | (West Germany) Harald Elschenbroich | (West Germany) Andreas Maurer (West Germany) Peter Elter | (France) François Jauffret (Socialist Federal Republic of Yugoslavia) Željko Franulović (West Germany) Hans Jürgen Pohmann (Chile) Hans Gildemeister |
| 19 Jun | Berlin Open; Berlin, West Germany; Clay – $50,000 – 32S/16D | (West Germany) Jürgen Fassbender (Switzerland) Colin Dowdeswell; 6–3, 6–4 | (Socialist Federal Republic of Yugoslavia) Željko Franulović (Chile) Hans Gildemeister | (West Germany) Andreas Maurer (West Germany) Peter Elter | (France) François Jauffret (Socialist Federal Republic of Yugoslavia) Željko Franulović (West Germany) Hans Jürgen Pohmann (Chile) Hans Gildemeister |
| 26 Jun; 3 Jul | Wimbledon; Grand Slam; London, England; Grass; Singles – Doubles – Mixed doubles | (Sweden) Björn Borg; 6–2, 6–2, 6–3 | (United States) Jimmy Connors | (Netherlands) Tom Okker (United States) Vitas Gerulaitis | (United States) Sandy Mayer (Romania) Ilie Năstase (United States) Brian Gottfried (Mexico) Raúl Ramírez |
| 26 Jun; 3 Jul | Wimbledon; Grand Slam; London, England; Grass; Singles – Doubles – Mixed doubles | (South Africa) Bob Hewitt (South Africa) Frew McMillan; 6–1, 6–4, 6–2 | (United States) John McEnroe (United States) Peter Fleming | (Netherlands) Tom Okker (United States) Vitas Gerulaitis | (United States) Sandy Mayer (Romania) Ilie Năstase (United States) Brian Gottfried (Mexico) Raúl Ramírez |
| 26 Jun; 3 Jul | Wimbledon; Grand Slam; London, England; Grass; Singles – Doubles – Mixed doubles | (South Africa) Frew McMillan (Netherlands) Betty Stöve; 6–1, 14–12 | (Australia) Ray Ruffels (United States) Billie Jean King | (Netherlands) Tom Okker (United States) Vitas Gerulaitis | (United States) Sandy Mayer (Romania) Ilie Năstase (United States) Brian Gottfried (Mexico) Raúl Ramírez |

=== July ===
| Week | Tournament | Champions | Runners-up | Semifinalists | Quarterfinalists |
|---|---|---|---|---|---|
| 10 Jul | Western Championships; Cincinnati, Ohio, US; Clay – $125,000 – 64S/32D | (United States) Eddie Dibbs; 5–7, 6–3, 6–2 | (Mexico) Raúl Ramírez | (United States) Harold Solomon (United States) Terry Moor | (United States) Erick Iskersky (Chile) Hans Gildemeister (Australia) Peter McNamara (Paraguay) Francisco González |
| 10 Jul | Western Championships; Cincinnati, Ohio, US; Clay – $125,000 – 64S/32D | (Mexico) Raúl Ramírez (United States) Gene Mayer; 2–6, 6–3, 6–4 | (Egypt) Ismail El Shafei (Australia) Brian Fairlie | (United States) Harold Solomon (United States) Terry Moor | (United States) Erick Iskersky (Chile) Hans Gildemeister (Australia) Peter McNamara (Paraguay) Francisco González |
| 10 Jul | Swiss Open; Gstaad, Switzerland; Clay – $75,000 – 32S/16D | (Argentina) Guillermo Vilas; 6–3, 7–6, 6–4 | (Argentina) José Luis Clerc | (United States) Jeff Borowiak (West Germany) Ulrich Pinner | (Switzerland) Heinz Günthardt (Chile) Belus Prajoux (Australia) Cliff Letcher (Netherlands) Tom Okker |
| 10 Jul | Swiss Open; Gstaad, Switzerland; Clay – $75,000 – 32S/16D | (Netherlands) Tom Okker (Australia) Mark Edmondson; 6–4, 1–6, 6–1, 6–4 | (South Africa) Bob Hewitt (Australia) Kim Warwick | (United States) Jeff Borowiak (West Germany) Ulrich Pinner | (Switzerland) Heinz Günthardt (Chile) Belus Prajoux (Australia) Cliff Letcher (Netherlands) Tom Okker |
| 10 Jul | Newport, Rhode Island, US; Grass – $75,000 – 32S/16D | (South Africa) Bernard Mitton; 8–6, 9–7 | (Australia) John James | (Australia) Bob Giltinan (United States) Tom Gullikson | (United States) Arthur Ashe (New Zealand) Russell Simpson (United States) Tim Wilkison (United States) Tim Gullikson |
| 10 Jul | Newport, Rhode Island, US; Grass – $75,000 – 32S/16D | (United States) Tom Gullikson (United States) Tim Gullikson; 6–4, 6–4 | (Australia) Colin Dibley (Australia) Bob Giltinan | (Australia) Bob Giltinan (United States) Tom Gullikson | (United States) Arthur Ashe (New Zealand) Russell Simpson (United States) Tim Wilkison (United States) Tim Gullikson |
| 17 Jul | Swedish Open; Båstad, Sweden; Clay – $75,000 – 32S/16D; Singles – Doubles | (Sweden) Björn Borg; 6–1, 6–2 | (Italy) Corrado Barazzutti | (Spain) Antonio Muñoz (Hungary) Balázs Taróczy | (New Zealand) Chris Lewis (Sweden) Kjell Johansson (Australia) Mark Edmondson (South Africa) Raymond Moore |
| 17 Jul | Swedish Open; Båstad, Sweden; Clay – $75,000 – 32S/16D; Singles – Doubles | (Australia) Mark Edmondson (Australia) Bob Carmichael; 7–5, 6–4 | (Hungary) Péter Szőke (Hungary) Balázs Taróczy | (Spain) Antonio Muñoz (Hungary) Balázs Taróczy | (New Zealand) Chris Lewis (Sweden) Kjell Johansson (Australia) Mark Edmondson (South Africa) Raymond Moore |
| 17 Jul | Mercedes Cup; Stuttgart, West Germany; Clay – $50,000 – 32S/16D | (West Germany) Ulrich Pinner; 6–2, 6–2, 7–6 | (Australia) Kim Warwick | (United Kingdom) Buster Mottram (Brazil) Carlos Kirmayr | (Chile) Belus Prajoux (Socialist Federal Republic of Yugoslavia) Željko Franulović (West Germany) Klaus Eberhard (West Germany) Peter Elter |
| 17 Jul | Mercedes Cup; Stuttgart, West Germany; Clay – $50,000 – 32S/16D | (Czechoslovakia) Tomáš Šmíd (Czechoslovakia) Jan Kodeš; 6–3, 7–6 | (Brazil) Carlos Kirmayr (Chile) Belus Prajoux | (United Kingdom) Buster Mottram (Brazil) Carlos Kirmayr | (Chile) Belus Prajoux (Socialist Federal Republic of Yugoslavia) Željko Franulović (West Germany) Klaus Eberhard (West Germany) Peter Elter |
| 17 Jul | Washington Star International; Washington, D.C., US; Super Series; Clay – $175,000 – 64S/32D | (United States) Jimmy Connors; 7–5, 7–5 | (United States) Eddie Dibbs | (Spain) José Higueras (Spain) Manuel Orantes | (Chile) Hans Gildemeister (United States) Harold Solomon (Poland) Wojciech Fibak (Chile) Jaime Fillol |
| 17 Jul | Washington Star International; Washington, D.C., US; Super Series; Clay – $175,000 – 64S/32D | (United States) Arthur Ashe (South Africa) Bob Hewitt; 6–3, 6–4 | (United States) Fred McNair (Mexico) Raúl Ramírez | (Spain) José Higueras (Spain) Manuel Orantes | (Chile) Hans Gildemeister (United States) Harold Solomon (Poland) Wojciech Fibak (Chile) Jaime Fillol |
| 24 Jul | Dutch Open; Hilversum, Netherlands; Clay – $50,000 – 32S/16D | (Hungary) Balázs Taróczy; 2–6, 6–1, 6–2, 6–4 | (Netherlands) Tom Okker | (Italy) Corrado Barazzutti (West Germany) Peter Elter | (Australia) David Carter (West Germany) Ulrich Pinner (France) Patrick Proisy (United Kingdom) Buster Mottram |
| 24 Jul | Dutch Open; Hilversum, Netherlands; Clay – $50,000 – 32S/16D | (Hungary) Balázs Taróczy (Netherlands) Tom Okker; 7–6, 4–6, 7–5 | (Australia) Bob Carmichael (Australia) Mark Edmondson | (Italy) Corrado Barazzutti (West Germany) Peter Elter | (Australia) David Carter (West Germany) Ulrich Pinner (France) Patrick Proisy (United Kingdom) Buster Mottram |
| 24 Jul | Kitzbühel, Austria; Clay – $75,000 – 32S/16D | (New Zealand) Chris Lewis; 6–1, 6–4, 6–0 | (Czechoslovakia) Vladimír Zedník | (Argentina) José Luis Clerc (Czechoslovakia) Jiří Hřebec | (Argentina) Guillermo Vilas (Hungary) Szabolcs Baranyi (Socialist Federal Republic of Yugoslavia) Željko Franulović (France) Christophe Roger-Vasselin |
| 24 Jul | Kitzbühel, Austria; Clay – $75,000 – 32S/16D | (New Zealand) Chris Lewis (United States) Mike Fishbach; 6–7, 6–4, 6–3 | (Czechoslovakia) Pavel Huťka (Czechoslovakia) Pavel Složil | (Argentina) José Luis Clerc (Czechoslovakia) Jiří Hřebec | (Argentina) Guillermo Vilas (Hungary) Szabolcs Baranyi (Socialist Federal Republic of Yugoslavia) Željko Franulović (France) Christophe Roger-Vasselin |
| 24 Jul | Louisville International Tennis Classic; Louisville, Kentucky, US; Super Series; Clay – $175,000 – 64S/32D | (United States) Harold Solomon; 6–2, 6–2 | (Australia) John Alexander | (Poland) Wojciech Fibak (United States) Eddie Dibbs | (United States) Brian Gottfried (Spain) Manuel Orantes (Chile) Patricio Cornejo (United States) Nick Saviano |
| 24 Jul | Louisville International Tennis Classic; Louisville, Kentucky, US; Super Series; Clay – $175,000 – 64S/32D | (Paraguay) Víctor Pecci (Poland) Wojciech Fibak; 6–4, 6–7, 6–4 | (United States) Victor Amaya (Australia) John James | (Poland) Wojciech Fibak (United States) Eddie Dibbs | (United States) Brian Gottfried (Spain) Manuel Orantes (Chile) Patricio Cornejo (United States) Nick Saviano |
| 31 Jul | Mutual Benefit Life Open; South Orange, New Jersey, US; Clay – $75,000 – 32S/16D | (Argentina) Guillermo Vilas; 6–1, 6–3 | (Argentina) José Luis Clerc | (Hungary) Balázs Taróczy (United States) John McEnroe | (United States) Jeff Borowiak (United States) Peter Fleming (United Kingdom) John Lloyd (South Africa) Deon Joubert |
| 31 Jul | Mutual Benefit Life Open; South Orange, New Jersey, US; Clay – $75,000 – 32S/16D | (United States) John McEnroe (United States) Peter Fleming; 6–3, 6–3 | (Romania) Ion Țiriac (Argentina) Guillermo Vilas | (Hungary) Balázs Taróczy (United States) John McEnroe | (United States) Jeff Borowiak (United States) Peter Fleming (United Kingdom) John Lloyd (South Africa) Deon Joubert |
| 31 Jul | Volvo International; North Conway, New Hampshire, US; Super Series; Clay – $175,000 – 64S/32D; Singles | (United States) Eddie Dibbs; 6–4, 6–4 | (Australia) John Alexander | (Spain) Manuel Orantes (Italy) Corrado Barazzutti | (United States) Harold Solomon (Poland) Wojciech Fibak (United States) Gene Mayer (Switzerland) Heinz Günthardt |
| 31 Jul | Volvo International; North Conway, New Hampshire, US; Super Series; Clay – $175,000 – 64S/32D; Singles | (United States) Van Winitsky (United Kingdom) Robin Drysdale; 4–6, 7–6, 6–3 | (United States) Mike Fishbach (South Africa) Bernard Mitton | (Spain) Manuel Orantes (Italy) Corrado Barazzutti | (United States) Harold Solomon (Poland) Wojciech Fibak (United States) Gene Mayer (Switzerland) Heinz Günthardt |
| 31 Jul | Hibernia Interfest Tennis Classic; New Orleans, Louisiana, US; Carpet (i) – $75,000 – 32S/16D | (United States) Roscoe Tanner; 6–3, 7–5 | (United States) Victor Amaya | (United States) Brian Teacher (New Zealand) Brian Fairlie | (Australia) Terry Rocavert (United States) Tom Leonard (United States) Bill Scanlon (United States) Dick Stockton |
| 31 Jul | Hibernia Interfest Tennis Classic; New Orleans, Louisiana, US; Carpet (i) – $75,000 – 32S/16D | (United States) Erik van Dillen (United States) Dick Stockton; 7–6, 6–3 | (Egypt) Ismail El Shafei (Australia) Brian Fairlie | (United States) Brian Teacher (New Zealand) Brian Fairlie | (Australia) Terry Rocavert (United States) Tom Leonard (United States) Bill Scanlon (United States) Dick Stockton |

=== August ===
| Week | Tournament | Champions | Runners-up | Semifinalists | Quarterfinalists |
|---|---|---|---|---|---|
| 7 Aug | Wendy's Tennis Classic; Columbus, Ohio, US; Clay – $75,000 – 32S/16D | (United States) Arthur Ashe; 6–3, 6–4 | (United States) Robert Lutz | (United States) Brian Gottfried (United States) Eliot Teltscher | (Paraguay) Francisco González (Colombia) Iván Molina (United States) Peter Fleming (United States) Tom Gullikson |
| 7 Aug | Wendy's Tennis Classic; Columbus, Ohio, US; Clay – $75,000 – 32S/16D | (Australia) Bob Giltinan (Australia) Colin Dibley; 6–2, 6–3 | (Mexico) Marcelo Lara (United States) Eliot Teltscher | (United States) Brian Gottfried (United States) Eliot Teltscher | (Paraguay) Francisco González (Colombia) Iván Molina (United States) Peter Fleming (United States) Tom Gullikson |
| 7 Aug | U.S. Men's Clay Court Championships; Indianapolis, Indiana, US; Super Series; Clay – $175,000 – 64S/32D; Singles – Doubles | (United States) Jimmy Connors; 7–5, 6–1 | (Spain) José Higueras | (Spain) Manuel Orantes (Italy) Corrado Barazzutti | (United States) John McEnroe (United States) Jeff Borowiak (Sweden) Kjell Johansson (Argentina) Guillermo Vilas |
| 7 Aug | U.S. Men's Clay Court Championships; Indianapolis, Indiana, US; Super Series; Clay – $175,000 – 64S/32D; Singles – Doubles | (United States) Hank Pfister (United States) Gene Mayer; 6–3, 6–1 | (United States) Jeff Borowiak (New Zealand) Chris Lewis | (Spain) Manuel Orantes (Italy) Corrado Barazzutti | (United States) John McEnroe (United States) Jeff Borowiak (Sweden) Kjell Johansson (Argentina) Guillermo Vilas |
| 14 Aug | Canadian Open; Toronto, Ontario, Canada; Super Series; Clay – $175,000 – 48S/24D | (United States) Eddie Dibbs; 5–7, 6–4, 6–1 | (Argentina) José Luis Clerc | (New Zealand) Chris Lewis (Australia) Paul Kronk | (United States) John McEnroe (Mexico) Raúl Ramírez (Hungary) Balázs Taróczy (Colombia) Iván Molina |
| 14 Aug | Canadian Open; Toronto, Ontario, Canada; Super Series; Clay – $175,000 – 48S/24D | (Netherlands) Tom Okker (Poland) Wojciech Fibak; 6–3, 7–6 | (Switzerland) Heinz Günthardt (Switzerland) Colin Dowdeswell | (New Zealand) Chris Lewis (Australia) Paul Kronk | (United States) John McEnroe (Mexico) Raúl Ramírez (Hungary) Balázs Taróczy (Colombia) Iván Molina |
| 14 Aug | English Leather Grand Prix; Stowe, Vermont, US; Hard – $75,000 – 32S/16D | (United States) Jimmy Connors; 5–7, 6–3, 6–2 | (United States) Tim Gullikson | (United States) Robert Lutz (United States) Eliot Teltscher | (United States) Tom Gullikson (United States) Cliff Richey (United States) Tim Gullikson (United States) Harold Solomon |
| 14 Aug | English Leather Grand Prix; Stowe, Vermont, US; Hard – $75,000 – 32S/16D | (United States) Tom Gullikson (United States) Tim Gullikson; 3–6, 7–6, 6–3 | (Australia) Mark Edmondson (Australia) Kim Warwick | (United States) Robert Lutz (United States) Eliot Teltscher | (United States) Tom Gullikson (United States) Cliff Richey (United States) Tim Gullikson (United States) Harold Solomon |
| 14 Aug | Cleveland, Ohio, US; Hard – $50,000 – 32S/16D | (Austria) Peter Feigl; 4–6, 6–3, 6–3 | (United States) Van Winitsky | (United States) Mike Cahill (United States) Dick Stockton | (France) Christophe Roger-Vasselin (United States) Erik van Dillen (United States) Rick Fisher (France) Pascal Portes |
| 14 Aug | Cleveland, Ohio, US; Hard – $50,000 – 32S/16D | (United States) Erik van Dillen (United States) Dick Stockton; 6–1, 6–4 | (United States) Rick Fisher (United States) Bruce Manson | (United States) Mike Cahill (United States) Dick Stockton | (France) Christophe Roger-Vasselin (United States) Erik van Dillen (United States) Rick Fisher (France) Pascal Portes |
| 21 Aug | Atlanta, Georgia, US; Hard – $50,000 – 32S/16D | (United States) Stan Smith; 4–6, 6–1, 2–1, ret. | (United States) Eliot Teltscher | (United States) Roscoe Tanner (United States) Butch Walts | (United States) Brian Teacher (Australia) Alvin Gardiner (Australia) John James (United States) Bruce Manson |
| 21 Aug | Atlanta, Georgia, US; Hard – $50,000 – 32S/16D | (United States) Butch Walts (Australia) John Alexander; 3–6, 6–4, 7–6 | (United States) Mike Cahill (Mexico) Marcelo Lara | (United States) Roscoe Tanner (United States) Butch Walts | (United States) Brian Teacher (Australia) Alvin Gardiner (Australia) John James (United States) Bruce Manson |
| 21 Aug | U.S. Pro Tennis Championships; Boston, Massachusetts, US; Super Series; Clay – $200,000 – 64S/32D | (Spain) Manuel Orantes; 6–4, 6–3 | (United States) Harold Solomon | (Italy) Corrado Barazzutti (United States) Arthur Ashe | (United States) John McEnroe (Spain) José Higueras (Poland) Wojciech Fibak (Argentina) José Luis Clerc |
| 21 Aug | U.S. Pro Tennis Championships; Boston, Massachusetts, US; Super Series; Clay – $200,000 – 64S/32D | (Hungary) Balázs Taróczy (Paraguay) Víctor Pecci; 6–3, 3–6, 6–1 | (Switzerland) Heinz Günthardt (United States) Van Winitsky | (Italy) Corrado Barazzutti (United States) Arthur Ashe | (United States) John McEnroe (Spain) José Higueras (Poland) Wojciech Fibak (Argentina) José Luis Clerc |
| 28 Aug; 4 Sep | US Open; Flushing Meadow, New York, US; Grand Slam; Hard; Singles – Doubles – Mixed doubles | (United States) Jimmy Connors; 6–4, 6–2, 6–2 | (Sweden) Björn Borg | (United States) Vitas Gerulaitis (United States) John McEnroe | (Mexico) Raúl Ramírez (South Africa) Johan Kriek (United States) Butch Walts (United States) Brian Gottfried |
| 28 Aug; 4 Sep | US Open; Flushing Meadow, New York, US; Grand Slam; Hard; Singles – Doubles – Mixed doubles | (United States) Robert Lutz (United States) Stan Smith; 1–6, 7–5, 6–3 | (United States) Marty Riessen (United States) Sherwood Stewart | (United States) Vitas Gerulaitis (United States) John McEnroe | (Mexico) Raúl Ramírez (South Africa) Johan Kriek (United States) Butch Walts (United States) Brian Gottfried |
| 28 Aug; 4 Sep | US Open; Flushing Meadow, New York, US; Grand Slam; Hard; Singles – Doubles – Mixed doubles | (Netherlands) Betty Stöve (South Africa) Frew McMillan; 6–3, 7–6 | (United States) Billie Jean King (Australia) Ray Ruffels | (United States) Vitas Gerulaitis (United States) John McEnroe | (Mexico) Raúl Ramírez (South Africa) Johan Kriek (United States) Butch Walts (United States) Brian Gottfried |

=== September ===
| Week | Tournament | Champions | Runners-up | Semifinalists | Quarterfinalists |
|---|---|---|---|---|---|
| 11 Sep | Woodlands Doubles; Woodlands, Texas, US; Hard – $125,000 – D32 | (Netherlands) Tom Okker (Poland) Wojciech Fibak; 7–6, 3–6, 4–6, 7–6, 6–3 | (United States) Marty Riessen (United States) Sherwood Stewart | | |
| 18 Sep | Hartford, Connecticut, US; Carpet (i) – $75,000 – 32S/16D | (United States) John McEnroe; 6–3, 7–5 | (South Africa) Johan Kriek | (United States) Hank Pfister (Rhodesia) Andrew Pattison | (United States) Gene Mayer (Australia) Alvin Gardiner (Spain) Antonio Muñoz (United States) Bill Scanlon |
| 18 Sep | Hartford, Connecticut, US; Carpet (i) – $75,000 – 32S/16D | (United States) Bill Maze (United States) John McEnroe; 6–3, 3–6 7–5 | (Australia) Mark Edmondson (United States) Van Winitsky | (United States) Hank Pfister (Rhodesia) Andrew Pattison | (United States) Gene Mayer (Australia) Alvin Gardiner (Spain) Antonio Muñoz (United States) Bill Scanlon |
| 18 Sep | Pacific Southwest Open; Los Angeles, California, US; Super Series; Carpet (i) – $200,000 – 64S/32D | (United States) Arthur Ashe; 6–2, 6–4 | (United States) Brian Gottfried | (United States) Harold Solomon (United States) Peter Fleming | (United States) Dick Stockton (Sweden) Jan Norbäck (United Kingdom) John Lloyd (South Africa) Cliff Drysdale |
| 18 Sep | Pacific Southwest Open; Los Angeles, California, US; Super Series; Carpet (i) – $200,000 – 64S/32D | (Australia) Phil Dent (Australia) John Alexander; 6–3, 7–6 | (United States) Fred McNair (Mexico) Raúl Ramírez | (United States) Harold Solomon (United States) Peter Fleming | (United States) Dick Stockton (Sweden) Jan Norbäck (United Kingdom) John Lloyd (South Africa) Cliff Drysdale |
| 18 Sep | British Hard Court Championships; Bournemouth, England; Clay – $50,000 – 32S/16D | (Spain) José Higueras; 6–2, 6–1, 6–3 | (Italy) Paolo Bertolucci | (Spain) Ángel Giménez (United Kingdom) Andrew Jarrett | (United Kingdom) John Feaver (New Zealand) Chris Lewis (United Kingdom) Mark Cox (Colombia) Iván Molina |
| 18 Sep | British Hard Court Championships; Bournemouth, England; Clay – $50,000 – 32S/16D | (Netherlands) Rolf Thung (Netherlands) Louk Sanders; 6–3, 6–4 | (Australia) David Carter (Australia) Rod Frawley | (Spain) Ángel Giménez (United Kingdom) Andrew Jarrett | (United Kingdom) John Feaver (New Zealand) Chris Lewis (United Kingdom) Mark Cox (Colombia) Iván Molina |
| 25 Sep | Aix-en-Provence, France; Clay – $50,000 – 32S/16D | (Argentina) Guillermo Vilas; 6–3, 6–0, 6–3 | (Argentina) José Luis Clerc | (New Zealand) Chris Lewis (Czechoslovakia) Ivan Lendl | (France) Patrick Proisy (France) Georges Goven (France) Éric Deblicker (Czechoslovakia) Tomáš Šmíd |
| 25 Sep | Aix-en-Provence, France; Clay – $50,000 – 32S/16D | (Argentina) Guillermo Vilas (Romania) Ion Țiriac; 7–6, 6–1 | (Czechoslovakia) Jan Kodeš (Czechoslovakia) Tomáš Šmíd | (New Zealand) Chris Lewis (Czechoslovakia) Ivan Lendl | (France) Patrick Proisy (France) Georges Goven (France) Éric Deblicker (Czechoslovakia) Tomáš Šmíd |
| 25 Sep | Mexico City, Mexico; Carpet (i) – $50,000 – 32S/16D | (India) Vijay Amritraj; 6–4, 6–4 | (Mexico) Raúl Ramírez | (Venezuela) Jorge Andrew (India) Sashi Menon | (United States) Eric Friedler (India) Anand Amritraj (Argentina) Lito Álvarez (Mexico) Roberto Chávez |
| 25 Sep | Mexico City, Mexico; Carpet (i) – $50,000 – 32S/16D | (India) Vijay Amritraj (India) Anand Amritraj; 6–4, 7–5 | (United States) Fred McNair (Mexico) Raúl Ramírez | (Venezuela) Jorge Andrew (India) Sashi Menon | (United States) Eric Friedler (India) Anand Amritraj (Argentina) Lito Álvarez (Mexico) Roberto Chávez |
| 25 Sep | Transamerica Open; San Francisco, California, US; Super Series; Carpet (i) – $175,000 – 64S/32D; Singles – Doubles | (United States) John McEnroe; 2–6, 7–6, 6–2 | (United States) Dick Stockton | (United States) Pat DuPré (United States) Eddie Dibbs | (Rhodesia) Andrew Pattison (United States) Brian Teacher (United States) Roscoe Tanner (Italy) Adriano Panatta |
| 25 Sep | Transamerica Open; San Francisco, California, US; Super Series; Carpet (i) – $175,000 – 64S/32D; Singles – Doubles | (United States) Peter Fleming (United States) John McEnroe; 5–7, 6–4, 6–4 | (United States) Robert Lutz (United States) Stan Smith | (United States) Pat DuPré (United States) Eddie Dibbs | (Rhodesia) Andrew Pattison (United States) Brian Teacher (United States) Roscoe Tanner (Italy) Adriano Panatta |

=== October ===
| Week | Tournament | Champions | Runners-up | Semifinalists | Quarterfinalists |
|---|---|---|---|---|---|
| 2 Oct | Island Holidays Classic; Maui, Hawaii, US; Hard – $100,000 – 32S/16D | (United States) Bill Scanlon; 6–2, 6–0 | (United States) Peter Fleming | (Mexico) Raúl Ramírez (United States) John McEnroe | (United States) Tim Gullikson (United States) Sandy Mayer (United States) Roscoe Tanner (United States) Harold Solomon |
| 2 Oct | Island Holidays Classic; Maui, Hawaii, US; Hard – $100,000 – 32S/16D | (United States) Tom Gullikson (United States) Tim Gullikson; 7–6, 7–6 | (United States) Peter Fleming (United States) John McEnroe | (Mexico) Raúl Ramírez (United States) John McEnroe | (United States) Tim Gullikson (United States) Sandy Mayer (United States) Roscoe Tanner (United States) Harold Solomon |
| 2 Oct | Madrid, Spain; Clay – $100,000 – 64S/32D | (Spain) José Higueras; 6–7, 6–3, 6–3, 6–4 | (Czechoslovakia) Tomáš Šmíd | (Italy) Corrado Barazzutti (Hungary) Balázs Taróczy | (Czechoslovakia) Pavel Složil (Chile) Hans Gildemeister (Italy) Adriano Panatta (Chile) Jaime Fillol |
| 2 Oct | Madrid, Spain; Clay – $100,000 – 64S/32D | (Czechoslovakia) Jan Kodeš (Poland) Wojciech Fibak; 6–7, 6–1, 6–2 | (Czechoslovakia) Pavel Složil (Czechoslovakia) Tomáš Šmíd | (Italy) Corrado Barazzutti (Hungary) Balázs Taróczy | (Czechoslovakia) Pavel Složil (Chile) Hans Gildemeister (Italy) Adriano Panatta (Chile) Jaime Fillol |
| 9 Oct | Trofeo Conde de Godó; Barcelona, Spain; Super Series; Clay – $175,000 – 64S/32D | (Hungary) Balázs Taróczy; 1–6, 7–5, 4–6, 6–3 | (Romania) Ilie Năstase | (Czechoslovakia) Ivan Lendl (Italy) Paolo Bertolucci | (Poland) Wojciech Fibak (West Germany) Ulrich Pinner (Spain) José Higueras (Czechoslovakia) Tomáš Šmíd |
| 9 Oct | Trofeo Conde de Godó; Barcelona, Spain; Super Series; Clay – $175,000 – 64S/32D | (Chile) Hans Gildemeister (Socialist Federal Republic of Yugoslavia) Željko Franulović; 6–1, 6–4 | (France) Jean-Louis Haillet (France) Gilles Moretton | (Czechoslovakia) Ivan Lendl (Italy) Paolo Bertolucci | (Poland) Wojciech Fibak (West Germany) Ulrich Pinner (Spain) José Higueras (Czechoslovakia) Tomáš Šmíd |
| 9 Oct | South Pacific Championships; Brisbane, Australia; Grass – $50,000 – 32S/16D | (Australia) Mark Edmondson; 6–4, 7–6 | (Australia) John Alexander | (United States) Arthur Ashe (Australia) Ken Rosewall | (Australia) Allan Stone (Australia) Ross Case (United States) Tom Gorman (Australia) Phil Dent |
| 9 Oct | South Pacific Championships; Brisbane, Australia; Grass – $50,000 – 32S/16D | (Australia) Phil Dent (Australia) John Alexander; 6–3, 7–6 | (Australia) Syd Ball (Australia) Allan Stone | (United States) Arthur Ashe (Australia) Ken Rosewall | (Australia) Allan Stone (Australia) Ross Case (United States) Tom Gorman (Australia) Phil Dent |
| 16 Oct | Sydney Indoor; Sydney, Australia; Super Series; Hard (i) – $175,000 – 32S/16D; Singles – Doubles | (United States) Jimmy Connors; 6–0, 6–0, 6–4 | (Australia) Geoff Masters | (United States) Pat DuPré (Australia) Ken Rosewall | (Australia) John Newcombe (United States) Sherwood Stewart (Australia) Terry Rocavert (Australia) Phil Dent |
| 16 Oct | Sydney Indoor; Sydney, Australia; Super Series; Hard (i) – $175,000 – 32S/16D; Singles – Doubles | (Australia) Tony Roche (Australia) John Newcombe; 6–4, 6–3 | (Australia) Mark Edmondson (Australia) John Marks | (United States) Pat DuPré (Australia) Ken Rosewall | (Australia) John Newcombe (United States) Sherwood Stewart (Australia) Terry Rocavert (Australia) Phil Dent |
| 23 Oct | Swiss Indoors; Basel, Switzerland; Hard (i) – $75,000 – 32S/16D; Singles – Doubles | (Argentina) Guillermo Vilas; 6–3, 5–7, 7–5, 6–4 | (United States) John McEnroe | (Poland) Wojciech Fibak (United States) Victor Amaya | (West Germany) Rolf Gehring (West Germany) Ulrich Pinner (Australia) Raymond Moore (Switzerland) Heinz Günthardt |
| 23 Oct | Swiss Indoors; Basel, Switzerland; Hard (i) – $75,000 – 32S/16D; Singles – Doubles | (United States) John McEnroe (Poland) Wojciech Fibak; 7–6, 7–5 | (United States) Bruce Manson (Rhodesia) Andrew Pattison | (Poland) Wojciech Fibak (United States) Victor Amaya | (West Germany) Rolf Gehring (West Germany) Ulrich Pinner (Australia) Raymond Moore (Switzerland) Heinz Günthardt |
| 23 Oct | Fred Perry Japan Open; Tokyo, Japan; Clay – $100,000 – 64S/32D | (Italy) Adriano Panatta; 6–3, 6–3 | (United States) Pat DuPré | (Socialist Federal Republic of Yugoslavia) Željko Franulović (United Kingdom) Buster Mottram | (United States) Eddie Dibbs (Australia) Geoff Masters (Japan) Jun Kuki (United States) Nick Saviano |
| 23 Oct | Fred Perry Japan Open; Tokyo, Japan; Clay – $100,000 – 64S/32D | (Australia) Geoff Masters (Australia) Ross Case; 6–2, 4–6, 6–1 | (Socialist Federal Republic of Yugoslavia) Željko Franulović (United Kingdom) Buster Mottram | (Socialist Federal Republic of Yugoslavia) Željko Franulović (United Kingdom) Buster Mottram | (United States) Eddie Dibbs (Australia) Geoff Masters (Japan) Jun Kuki (United States) Nick Saviano |
| 23 Oct | Vienna Indoor; Vienna, Austria; Hard (i) – $75,000 – 32S/16D; Singles – Doubles | (United States) Stan Smith; 4–6, 7–6, 7–6, 6–3 | (Hungary) Balázs Taróczy | (South Africa) Johan Kriek (Italy) Corrado Barazzutti | (United States) Brian Gottfried (United States) John Austin (Sweden) Ove Nils Bengtson (Czechoslovakia) Tomáš Šmíd |
| 23 Oct | Vienna Indoor; Vienna, Austria; Hard (i) – $75,000 – 32S/16D; Singles – Doubles | (Hungary) Balázs Taróczy (Paraguay) Víctor Pecci; 6–3, 6–7, 6–4 | (South Africa) Bob Hewitt (South Africa) Frew McMillan | (South Africa) Johan Kriek (Italy) Corrado Barazzutti | (United States) Brian Gottfried (United States) John Austin (Sweden) Ove Nils Bengtson (Czechoslovakia) Tomáš Šmíd |
| 30 Oct | Cologne Cup; Cologne, West Germany; Hard (i) – $75,000 – 32S/16D | (Poland) Wojciech Fibak; 6–2, 0–1, ret. | (India) Vijay Amritraj | (United States) John McEnroe (Switzerland) Heinz Günthardt | (South Africa) Johan Kriek (West Germany) Karl Meiler (Hungary) Balázs Taróczy (Italy) Corrado Barazzutti |
| 30 Oct | Cologne Cup; Cologne, West Germany; Hard (i) – $75,000 – 32S/16D | (United States) Peter Fleming (United States) John McEnroe; 6–3, 6–2 | (South Africa) Bob Hewitt (South Africa) Frew McMillan | (United States) John McEnroe (Switzerland) Heinz Günthardt | (South Africa) Johan Kriek (West Germany) Karl Meiler (Hungary) Balázs Taróczy (Italy) Corrado Barazzutti |
| 30 Oct | Seiko World Super Tennis; Tokyo, Japan; Super Series; Carpet (i) – $200,000 – 32S/16D; Singles – Doubles | (Sweden) Björn Borg; 6–2, 6–0 | (United States) Brian Teacher | (United States) Sandy Mayer (Romania) Ilie Năstase | (United States) Arthur Ashe (United States) Vitas Gerulaitis (United States) Eddie Dibbs (United States) Harold Solomon |
| 30 Oct | Seiko World Super Tennis; Tokyo, Japan; Super Series; Carpet (i) – $200,000 – 32S/16D; Singles – Doubles | (Australia) Geoff Masters (Australia) Ross Case; 6–3, 6–4 | (United States) Pat DuPré (United States) Tom Gorman | (United States) Sandy Mayer (Romania) Ilie Năstase | (United States) Arthur Ashe (United States) Vitas Gerulaitis (United States) Eddie Dibbs (United States) Harold Solomon |
| 30 Oct | French Indoor Championships; Paris, France; Hard (i) – $50,000 – 32S/16D; Singles – Doubles | (United States) Robert Lutz; 6–2, 6–2, 7–6 | (United States) Tom Gullikson | (United States) Brian Gottfried (United Kingdom) Mark Cox | (United Kingdom) Robin Drysdale (West Germany) Ulrich Pinner (France) Patrick Proisy (United States) John Austin |
| 30 Oct | French Indoor Championships; Paris, France; Hard (i) – $50,000 – 32S/16D; Singles – Doubles | (Rhodesia) Andrew Pattison (United States) Bruce Manson; 7–6, 6–2 | (Romania) Ion Țiriac (Argentina) Guillermo Vilas | (United States) Brian Gottfried (United Kingdom) Mark Cox | (United Kingdom) Robin Drysdale (West Germany) Ulrich Pinner (France) Patrick Proisy (United States) John Austin |

=== November ===
| Week | Tournament | Champions | Runners-up | Semifinalists | Quarterfinalists |
|---|---|---|---|---|---|
| 6 Nov | Stockholm Open; Stockholm, Sweden; Super Series; Hard (i) – $175,000 – 64S/32D; Singles – Doubles | (United States) John McEnroe; 6–2, 6–2 | (United States) Tim Gullikson | (Sweden) Björn Borg (Poland) Wojciech Fibak | (United States) Peter Fleming (Netherlands) Tom Okker (United States) Arthur Ashe (United States) Stan Smith |
| 6 Nov | Stockholm Open; Stockholm, Sweden; Super Series; Hard (i) – $175,000 – 64S/32D; Singles – Doubles | (Netherlands) Tom Okker (Poland) Wojciech Fibak; 6–3, 6–2 | (United States) Robert Lutz (United States) Stan Smith | (Sweden) Björn Borg (Poland) Wojciech Fibak | (United States) Peter Fleming (Netherlands) Tom Okker (United States) Arthur Ashe (United States) Stan Smith |
| 6 Nov | Colgate-Hong Kong Patrons Classic; Hong Kong; Hard – $75,000 – 32S/16D | (United States) Eliot Teltscher; 6–4, 6–3, 6–2 | (United States) Pat DuPré | (United States) Hank Pfister (India) Ramesh Krishnan | (United States) Butch Walts (Australia) Ken Rosewall (Australia) Geoff Masters (United States) Terry Moor |
| 6 Nov | Colgate-Hong Kong Patrons Classic; Hong Kong; Hard – $75,000 – 32S/16D | (Australia) John Marks (Australia) Mark Edmondson; 5–7, 7–6, 6–1 | (United States) Hank Pfister (United States) Brad Rowe | (United States) Hank Pfister (India) Ramesh Krishnan | (United States) Butch Walts (Australia) Ken Rosewall (Australia) Geoff Masters (United States) Terry Moor |
| 13 Nov | Cathay Trust Championships; Taipei, Taiwan; Carpet (i) – $50,000 – 32S/16D | (United States) Brian Teacher; 6–3, 6–3, 6–3 | (United States) Tom Gorman | (United States) Mike Cahill (United States) Pat DuPré | (United States) Butch Walts (Australia) Steve Docherty (France) Yannick Noah (France) Pascal Portes |
| 13 Nov | Cathay Trust Championships; Taipei, Taiwan; Carpet (i) – $50,000 – 32S/16D | (United States) Butch Walts (United States) Sherwood Stewart; 6–2, 6–7, 7–6 | (Australia) Mark Edmondson (Australia) John Marks | (United States) Mike Cahill (United States) Pat DuPré | (United States) Butch Walts (Australia) Steve Docherty (France) Yannick Noah (France) Pascal Portes |
| 13 Nov | Benson & Hedges Championships; London, England; Super Series; Carpet (i) – $175,000 – 32S/16D; Singles | (United States) John McEnroe; 6–7, 6–4, 7–6, 6–2 | (United States) Tim Gullikson | (United States) Arthur Ashe (United States) Dick Stockton | (United States) Sandy Mayer (United States) Stan Smith (Italy) Corrado Barazzutti (Italy) Adriano Panatta |
| 13 Nov | Benson & Hedges Championships; London, England; Super Series; Carpet (i) – $175,000 – 32S/16D; Singles | (United States) Peter Fleming (United States) John McEnroe; 7–6, 4–6, 6–4 | (South Africa) Bob Hewitt (South Africa) Frew McMillan | (United States) Arthur Ashe (United States) Dick Stockton | (United States) Sandy Mayer (United States) Stan Smith (Italy) Corrado Barazzutti (Italy) Adriano Panatta |
| 13 Nov | Colgate Grand Prix of Bogota; Bogotá, Colombia; Clay – $50,000 – 32S/16D | (Paraguay) Víctor Pecci; 6–4, 3–6, 6–3, 6–3 | (West Germany) Rolf Gehring | (Uruguay) José Luis Damiani (Australia) Paul McNamee | (Spain) José Higueras (Colombia) Jairo Velasco Sr. (New Zealand) Chris Lewis (Rhodesia) Andrew Pattison |
| 13 Nov | Colgate Grand Prix of Bogota; Bogotá, Colombia; Clay – $50,000 – 32S/16D | (Chile) Álvaro Fillol (Chile) Jaime Fillol; 6–4, 6–3 | (Chile) Hans Gildemeister (Paraguay) Víctor Pecci | (Uruguay) José Luis Damiani (Australia) Paul McNamee | (Spain) José Higueras (Colombia) Jairo Velasco Sr. (New Zealand) Chris Lewis (Rhodesia) Andrew Pattison |
| 20 Nov | Philta International; Manila, Philippines; Clay (i) – $75,000 – 32S/16D | (France) Yannick Noah; 7–6, 6–0 | (Austria) Peter Feigl | (Australia) Peter McNamara (United States) Brian Teacher | (United States) Mike Cahill (Spain) Ángel Giménez (United States) Terry Moor (United States) Tom Gorman |
| 20 Nov | Philta International; Manila, Philippines; Clay (i) – $75,000 – 32S/16D | (United States) Brian Teacher (United States) Sherwood Stewart; 6–3, 7–6 | (Australia) Ross Case (Australia) Chris Kachel | (Australia) Peter McNamara (United States) Brian Teacher | (United States) Mike Cahill (Spain) Ángel Giménez (United States) Terry Moor (United States) Tom Gorman |
| 20 Nov | South American Championships; Buenos Aires, Argentina; Super Series; Clay – $175,000 – 32S/16D; Singles | (Argentina) José Luis Clerc; 6–4, 6–4 | (Paraguay) Víctor Pecci | (Italy) Corrado Barazzutti (United States) Harold Solomon | (Brazil) Carlos Kirmayr (Spain) José Higueras (Ecuador) Ricardo Ycaza (New Zealand) Chris Lewis |
| 20 Nov | South American Championships; Buenos Aires, Argentina; Super Series; Clay – $175,000 – 32S/16D; Singles | (United States) Van Winitsky (New Zealand) Chris Lewis; 6–4, 3–6, 6–0 | (Argentina) José Luis Clerc (Chile) Belus Prajoux | (Italy) Corrado Barazzutti (United States) Harold Solomon | (Brazil) Carlos Kirmayr (Spain) José Higueras (Ecuador) Ricardo Ycaza (New Zealand) Chris Lewis |
| 20 Nov | Italian Indoor Open; Bologna, Italy; Carpet (i) – $50,000 – 32S/16D | (United States) Peter Fleming; 6–2, 7–6^{(7–5)} | (Italy) Adriano Panatta | (United States) John McEnroe (Socialist Federal Republic of Yugoslavia) Željko Franulović | (West Germany) Karl Meiler (Hungary) Balázs Taróczy (Czechoslovakia) Tomáš Šmíd (South Africa) Bernard Mitton |
| 20 Nov | Italian Indoor Open; Bologna, Italy; Carpet (i) – $50,000 – 32S/16D | (United States) Peter Fleming (United States) John McEnroe; 6–1, 6–4 | (France) Jean-Louis Haillet (Italy) Antonio Zugarelli | (United States) John McEnroe (Socialist Federal Republic of Yugoslavia) Željko Franulović | (West Germany) Karl Meiler (Hungary) Balázs Taróczy (Czechoslovakia) Tomáš Šmíd (South Africa) Bernard Mitton |
| 27 Nov | Indian Open; Calcutta, India; Clay – $50,000 – 32S/16D | (France) Yannick Noah; 6–3, 6–2 | (France) Pascal Portes | (India) Anand Amritraj (Netherlands) Louk Sanders | (India) Vijay Amritraj (United States) Sherwood Stewart (India) Ramesh Krishnan (France) Christophe Freyss |
| 27 Nov | Indian Open; Calcutta, India; Clay – $50,000 – 32S/16D | (United States) Sherwood Stewart (India) Sashi Menon; 7–6, 6–4 | (France) Gilles Moretton (France) Yannick Noah | (India) Anand Amritraj (Netherlands) Louk Sanders | (India) Vijay Amritraj (United States) Sherwood Stewart (India) Ramesh Krishnan (France) Christophe Freyss |
| 27 Nov | South African Open; Johannesburg, South Africa; Super Series; Hard – $175,000 – 32S/16D | (United States) Tim Gullikson; 2–6, 7–6, 7–6, 6–7, 6–4 | (United States) Harold Solomon | (South Africa) Johan Kriek (South Africa) David Schneider | (United States) Tom Gullikson (Switzerland) Colin Dowdeswell (United States) Peter Fleming (Switzerland) Heinz Günthardt |
| 27 Nov | South African Open; Johannesburg, South Africa; Super Series; Hard – $175,000 – 32S/16D | (South Africa) Raymond Moore (United States) Peter Fleming; 6–3, 7–6 | (South Africa) Bob Hewitt (South Africa) Frew McMillan | (South Africa) Johan Kriek (South Africa) David Schneider | (United States) Tom Gullikson (Switzerland) Colin Dowdeswell (United States) Peter Fleming (Switzerland) Heinz Günthardt |
| 27 Nov | Chilean International Championships; Santiago, Chile; Clay – $75,000 – 32S/16D | (Argentina) José Luis Clerc; 3–6, 6–3, 6–1 | (Paraguay) Víctor Pecci | (Australia) Paul McNamee (West Germany) Rolf Gehring | (Italy) Paolo Bertolucci (Argentina) Ricardo Cano (Chile) Hans Gildemeister (Peru) Fernando Maynetto |
| 27 Nov | Chilean International Championships; Santiago, Chile; Clay – $75,000 – 32S/16D | (Paraguay) Víctor Pecci (Chile) Hans Gildemeister; 6–4, 6–3 | (Chile) Jaime Fillol (Chile) Álvaro Fillol | (Australia) Paul McNamee (West Germany) Rolf Gehring | (Italy) Paolo Bertolucci (Argentina) Ricardo Cano (Chile) Hans Gildemeister (Peru) Fernando Maynetto |

=== December ===
| Week | Tournament | Champions | Runners-up | Semifinalists | Quarterfinalists |
|---|---|---|---|---|---|
| 18 Dec | New South Wales Open; Sydney, Australia; Grass – $100,000 – 64S/32D | (United States) Tim Wilkison; 6–3, 6–3, 6–7, 3–6, 6–2 | (Australia) Kim Warwick | (United States) Sherwood Stewart (Australia) John Alexander | (Argentina) Guillermo Vilas (Australia) Paul Kronk (Australia) Allan Stone (South Africa) Bernard Mitton |
| 18 Dec | New South Wales Open; Sydney, Australia; Grass – $100,000 – 64S/32D | (United States) Hank Pfister (United States) Sherwood Stewart; 6–4, 6–4 | (Australia) Syd Ball (Australia) Bob Carmichael | (United States) Sherwood Stewart (Australia) John Alexander | (Argentina) Guillermo Vilas (Australia) Paul Kronk (Australia) Allan Stone (South Africa) Bernard Mitton |
| 25 Dec | Australian Open; Melbourne, Australia; Grand Slam; Grass; Singles – Doubles | (Argentina) Guillermo Vilas; 6–4, 6–4, 3–6, 6–3 | (Australia) John Marks | (United States) Hank Pfister (United States) Arthur Ashe | (Australia) Tony Roche (Australia) Paul Kronk (Austria) Peter Feigl (Australia) John Alexander |
| 25 Dec | Australian Open; Melbourne, Australia; Grand Slam; Grass; Singles – Doubles | (Poland) Wojciech Fibak (Australia) Kim Warwick; 7–6, 7–5 | (Australia) Paul Kronk (Australia) Cliff Letcher | (United States) Hank Pfister (United States) Arthur Ashe | (Australia) Tony Roche (Australia) Paul Kronk (Austria) Peter Feigl (Australia) John Alexander |

=== January 1979 ===
| Week | Tournament | Champions | Runners-up | Semifinalists | Quarterfinalists |
|---|---|---|---|---|---|
| 8 Jan | Colgate-Palmolive Masters; New York City, US; Carpet (i) – $400,000 – 8S/4D; Singles – Doubles | (United States) John McEnroe; 6–7, 6–3, 7–5 | (United States) Arthur Ashe | (United States) Brian Gottfried (United States) Eddie Dibbs | (United States) Jimmy Connors (United States) Harold Solomon (Mexico) Raúl Ramírez (Italy) Corrado Barazutti |
| 8 Jan | Colgate-Palmolive Masters; New York City, US; Carpet (i) – $400,000 – 8S/4D; Singles – Doubles | (United States) Peter Fleming (United States) John McEnroe; 6–4, 6–2, 6–4 | (Poland) Wojciech Fibak (Netherlands) Tom Okker | (United States) Brian Gottfried (United States) Eddie Dibbs | (United States) Jimmy Connors (United States) Harold Solomon (Mexico) Raúl Ramírez (Italy) Corrado Barazutti |

== Points system ==
The tournaments of the 1978 Grand Prix circuit were divided into nine point categories. The highest points were allocated to the Grand Slam tournaments; French Open, the Wimbledon Championships, the US Open and the Australian Open. The eight WCT events were part of the $175,000-plus "Super Series" category. Points were allocated based on these categories and the finishing position of a player in a tournament. The points table is based on a 32 player draw. No points were awarded to first-round losers and advancements by default were equal to winning a round. The points allocation, with doubles points listed in brackets, is as follows:

| | Grand Slam | $250,000+ | $225,000+ | $200,000+ | $175,000+ | $125,000+ | $100,000+ | $75,000+ | $50,000+ |
|---|---|---|---|---|---|---|---|---|---|
| Category | 1 | 2 | 3 | 4 | 5 | 6 | 7 | 8 | 9 |
| Winner | 300 (60) | 250 (50) | 225 (45) | 200 (40) | 175 (35) | 125 (25) | 100 (20) | 75 (15) | 50 (10) |
| Runner-up | 210 (42) | 175 (35) | 157 (31) | 140 (28) | 122 (24) | 87 (17) | 70 (14) | 52 (10) | 35 (7) |
| Semifinalist | 120 (24) | 100 (20) | 90 (18) | 80 (16) | 70 (14) | 50 (10) | 40 (8) | 30 (6) | 20 (4) |
| Quarterfinalist | 60 (12) | 50 (10) | 45 (9) | 40 (8) | 35 (7) | 25 (5) | 20 (4) | 15 (3) | 10 (2) |
| Fourth round | 30 (6) | 25 (5) | 22 (5) | 20 (4) | 17 (3) | 12 (2) | 10 (2) | 7 (–) | 5 (–) |
| Third round | 15 (–) | 12 (–) | 11 (–) | 10 (–) | 9 (–) | 6 (–) | 5 (–) | – (–) | – (–) |
| Second round | 7 (–) | 6 (–) | – (–) | – (–) | – (–) | – (–) | – (–) | – (–) | – (–) |

== Top tournaments ranked by Grand Prix points & prize money ==
| Tournament | Prize money | Category |
|---|---|---|
| The four Grand Slam tournaments | | 1 |
| Colgate-Palmolive Masters | $400,000 | |
| Las Vegas | $250,000 | 2 |
| Rancho Mirage (Palm Springs) | $225,000 | 3 |
| Memphis | $225,000 | 3 |
| Philadelphia | $225,000 | 3 |
| Italian Open | $210,000 | 4 |
| Boston | $200,000 | 4 |
| Los Angeles | $200,000 | 4 |
| Tokyo | $200,000 | 4 |

== Grand Prix standings ==
| Rk | Name | Points | Bonus |
|---|---|---|---|
| 1 | Jimmy Connors (USA) | 2,030 | — (Note: Did not play a sufficient amount of tournaments to be eligible for a bonus.) |
| 2 | Björn Borg (SWE) | 1,822 | — |
| 3 | Eddie Dibbs (USA) | 1,500 | $300,000 |
| 4 | Raúl Ramírez (MEX) | 1,294 | $200,000 |
| 5 | Harold Solomon (USA) | 1,292 | $150,000 |
| 6 | John McEnroe (USA) | 1,221 | $100,000 |
| 7 | Guillermo Vilas (ARG) | 1,220 | — (Note: Did not compete for bonus pool.) |
| 8 | Brian Gottfried (USA) | 1,167 | $80,000 |
| 9 | Corrado Barazzutti (ITA) | 1,011 | $60,000 |
| 10 | Arthur Ashe (USA) | 987 | $50,000 |

== ATP rankings ==
As of 1 January 1978
| Rk | Name |
|---|---|
| 1 | Jimmy Connors (USA) |
| 2 | Guillermo Vilas (ARG) |
| 3 | Björn Borg (SWE) |
| 4 | Vitas Gerulaitis (USA) |
| 5 | Brian Gottfried (USA) |
| 6 | Eddie Dibbs (USA) |
| 7 | Manuel Orantes (ESP) |
| 8 | Raúl Ramírez (MEX) |
| 9 | Ilie Năstase (ROU) |
| 10 | Dick Stockton (USA) |
| 11 | Corrado Barazzutti (ITA) |
| 12 | Ken Rosewall (AUS) |
| 13 | Wojciech Fibak (POL) |
| 14 | Harold Solomon (USA) |
| 15 | Roscoe Tanner (USA) |
| 16 | Sandy Mayer (USA) |
| 17 | Jaime Fillol (CHI) |
| 18 | John Alexander (AUS) |
| 19 | Tony Roche (AUS) |
| 20 | Buster Mottram (GBR) |

Year-end rankings 1978 (3 January 1979)
| Rk | Name | Points | Average | High | Low | Change |
|---|---|---|---|---|---|---|
| 1 | Jimmy Connors (USA) | 1239 | 88.50 | | | = |
| 2 | Björn Borg (SWE) | 1106 | 79.00 | | | ▲ +1 |
| 3 | Guillermo Vilas (ARG) | 830 | 55.33 | | | ▼ –1 |
| 4 | John McEnroe (USA) | 871 | 43.55 | | | ▲ +17 |
| 5 | Vitas Gerulaitis (USA) | 574 | 41.00 | | | ▼ –1 |
| 6 | Eddie Dibbs (USA) | 1096 | 40.59 | | | = |
| 7 | Brian Gottfried (USA) | 856 | 34.24 | | | ▼ –2 |
| 8 | Raúl Ramírez (MEX) | 895 | 33.15 | | | = |
| 9 | Harold Solomon (USA) | 892 | 33.04 | | | ▲ +5 |
| 10 | Corrado Barazzutti (ITA) | 728 | 30.33 | | | ▲ +1 |
| 11 | Roscoe Tanner (USA) | 647 | 29.41 | | | ▲ +4 |
| 12 | Manuel Orantes (ESP) | 553 | 29.11 | | | ▼ –5 |
| 13 | Arthur Ashe (USA) | 720 | 27.69 | | | ▲ +117 |
| 14 | José Higueras (ESP) | 635 | 27.61 | | | ▲ +16 |
| 15 | José Luis Clerc (ARG) | 546 | 27.30 | | | ▲ +263 |
| 16 | Ilie Năstase (ROU) | 491 | 27.28 | | | ▼ –7 |
| 17 | Sandy Mayer (USA) | 531 | 26.55 | | | ▼ –1 |
| 18 | Tim Gullikson (USA) | 611 | 24.44 | | | ▲ +42 |
| 19 | Dick Stockton (USA) | 530 | 23.04 | | | ▼ –9 |
| 20 | Balázs Taróczy (HUN) | 438 | 21.90 | | | ▲ +12 |

*The official ATP year-end rankings were listed from January 3rd, 1979.

== List of tournament winners ==
The list of winners and number of singles titles won, alphabetically by last name:

- (India) Vijay Amritraj (1) Mexico City
- (United States) Arthur Ashe (3) San Jose, Columbus, Los Angeles
- (Sweden) Björn Borg (9) Birmingham WCT, Boca Raton, Las Vegas, Milan WCT, Rome, French Open, Wimbledon, Båstad, Tokyo Indoor
- (Argentina) José Luis Clerc (3) Florence, Buenos Aires, Santiago
- (United States) Jimmy Connors (10) Philadelphia, Denver, Memphis, Rotterdam WCT, Birmingham, Washington, D.C., Indianapolis, Stowe, US Open, Sydney Indoor
- (United States) Eddie Dibbs (4) Tulsa, Cincinnati, North Conway, Toronto
- (South Africa) Cliff Drysdale (1) Baltimore
- (Australia) Mark Edmondson (1) Brisbane
- (Austria) Peter Feigl (1) Cleveland
- (Poland) Wojciech Fibak (1) Cologne
- (United States) Peter Fleming (1) Bologna
- (United States) Vitas Gerulaitis (3) Richmond WCT, Dallas WCT, Forest Hills WCT
- (United States) Brian Gottfried (3) Washington Indoor, Dayton, Houston
- (United States) Tim Gullikson (1) Johannesburg
- (Switzerland) Heinz Günthardt (1) Springfield
- (Spain) José Higueras (4) Cairo, Nice, Bournemouth, Madrid
- (Sweden) Kjell Johansson (1) Nigeria
- (New Zealand) Chris Lewis (1) Kitzbühel
- (United States) Robert Lutz (1) Bercy
- (United States) Gene Mayer (1) Guadalajara
- (United States) Sandy Mayer (1) St. Louis WCT
- (United States) John McEnroe (4) Hartford, San Francisco, Stockholm, Wembley
- (South Africa) Bernard Mitton (1) Newport
- (Romania) Ilie Năstase (2) Miami, WCT Challenge Cup
- (France) Yannick Noah (2) Manila, Calcutta
- (Spain) Manuel Orantes (1) Boston
- (Italy) Adriano Panatta (1) Tokyo Outdoor
- (Paraguay) Víctor Pecci (1) Bogotá
- (West Germany) Ulrich Pinner (1) Stuttgart Outdoor
- Raúl Ramírez (2) Mexico City WCT, Monte Carlo WCT
- (United States) Cliff Richey (1) Johannesburg
- (Australia) Tony Roche (1) Queen's Club
- (United States) Bill Scanlon (1) Maui
- (Czechoslovakia) Tomáš Šmíd (1) Sarasota
- (United States) Stan Smith (2) Atlanta, Vienna
- (United States) Harold Solomon (2) Las Vegas, Louisville
- (United States) Dick Stockton (1) Little Rock
- (United States) Roscoe Tanner (2) Palm Springs, New Orleans
- (Hungary) Balázs Taróczy (2) Hilversum, Barcelona
- (United States) Brian Teacher (1) Taiwan
- (United States) Eliot Teltscher (1) Hong Kong
- (Argentina) Guillermo Vilas (7) Hamburg, Munich, Gstaad, South Orange, Aix-en-Provence, Basel, Australian Open
- (United States) Tim Wilkison (1) Sydney Outdoor
- (Czechoslovakia) Vladimír Zedník (1) Berlin
- (West Germany) Werner Zirngibl (1) Brussels

The following players won their first title in 1978:

- (Argentina) José Luis Clerc (Florence)
- (Austria) Peter Feigl (Cleveland)
- (United States) Peter Fleming (Bologna)
- (Switzerland) Heinz Günthardt (Springfield)
- (Sweden) Kjell Johansson (Nigeria)
- (United States) Gene Mayer (Guadalajara)
- (United States) John McEnroe (Hartford)
- (South Africa) Bernard Mitton (Newport)
- (France) Yannick Noah (Manila)
- (West Germany) Ulrich Pinner (Stuttgart Outdoor)
- (Czechoslovakia) Tomáš Šmíd (Sarasota)
- (United States) Eliot Teltscher (Hong Kong)
- (United States) Tim Wilkison (Sydney Outdoor)

== See also ==
- 1978 WTA Tour – women's circuit
