= 1978 Alitalia Florence Open =

- Date: 15–21 May
- Edition: 6th
- Category: Grand Prix
- Draw: 32S / 16D
- Prize money: $50,000
- Surface: Clay / outdoor
- Location: Florence, Italy

Champions

Singles
- (Argentina) José Luis Clerc

Doubles
- (Italy) Corrado Barazzutti / (Italy) Adriano Panatta
- ATP Florence

The 1978 Alitalia Florence Open was a men's tennis tournament played on outdoor clay courts in Florence, Italy that was part of the 1978 Colgate-Palmolive Grand Prix circuit. It was the sixth edition of the tournament and was played from 15 May until 21 May 1978. Unseeded José Luis Clerc won the singles title.

== Finals ==
=== Singles ===
(Argentina) José Luis Clerc defeated (France) Patrice Dominguez 6–4, 6–2, 6–1

- It was Clerc's first singles title of his career.

=== Doubles ===
(Italy) Corrado Barazzutti / (Italy) Adriano Panatta defeated (Australia) Mark Edmondson / (Australia) John Marks 6–3, 6–7, 6–3

- It was Barazzutti's only doubles title of his career. It was Panatta's only doubles title of the year and the 12th of his career.
