= 1978 Hibernia Interfest Tennis Classic =

Tennis tournament

- Date: July 31 – August 6
- Edition: 1st
- Category: Grand Prix
- Draw: 32S / 16D
- Prize money: $75,000
- Surface: Clay / indoor
- Location: New Orleans, Louisiana, U.S.
- Venue: Louisiana Superdome

Champions

Singles
- (United States) Roscoe Tanner

Doubles
- (United States) Erik van Dillen / (United States) Dick Stockton
New Orleans Grand Prix	· 1979 →

The 1978 Hibernia Interfest Tennis Classic, also known as the New Orleans Grand Prix, was a men's tennis tournament played on indoor carpet courts at the Louisiana Superdome in New Orleans, Louisiana in the United States that was part of the 1978 Colgate-Palmolive Grand Prix. It was the inaugural edition of the tournament and was held from July 31 through August 6, 1978. First-seeded Roscoe Tanner won the singles title.

== Finals ==
=== Singles ===
(United States) Roscoe Tanner defeated (United States) Victor Amaya 6–3, 7–5

- It was Tanner's 2nd singles title of the year and the 12th of his career.

=== Doubles ===
(United States) Erik van Dillen / (United States) Dick Stockton defeated (Egypt) Ismail El Shafei / (New Zealand) Brian Fairlie 7–6, 6–3

- It was Van Dillen's 1st doubles title of the year and the 10th of his career. It was Stockton's 1st doubles title of the year and the 12th of his career.
