= 1978 Torneo Godó =

- Date: 9–15 October
- Edition: 26th
- Category: Grand Prix circuit
- Draw: 64S / 32D
- Prize money: $175,000
- Surface: Clay / outdoor
- Location: Barcelona, Catalonia, Spain
- Venue: Real Club de Tenis Barcelona

Champions

Singles
- (Hungary) Balázs Taróczy

Doubles
- (Socialist Federal Republic of Yugoslavia) Željko Franulović / (Chile) Hans Gildemeister
- Torneo Godó

The 1978 Torneo Godó or Trofeo Conde de Godó was a men's tennis tournament that took place on outdoor clay courts at the Real Club de Tenis Barcelona in Barcelona, Catalonia in Spain. It was the 26th edition of the tournament and was part of the 1978 Grand Prix circuit. It was held from 9 October until 15 October 1978. Eighth-seeded Balázs Taróczy won the singles title.

== Finals ==
=== Singles ===
(Hungary) Balázs Taróczy defeated (Romania) Ilie Năstase 1–6, 7–5, 4–6, 6–3, 6–4

- It was Taróczy's 2nd singles title of the year and the 4th of his career.

=== Doubles ===
(Socialist Federal Republic of Yugoslavia) Željko Franulović' / (Chile) Hans Gildemeister defeated (France) Jean-Louis Haillet / (France) Gilles Moretton 6–1, 6–4
