= 1978 Fred Perry Japan Open =

- Date: 23–29 October
- Edition: 6th
- Category: Grand Prix
- Draw: 48S / 24D
- Prize money: $100,000
- Surface: Clay / outdoor
- Location: Tokyo, Japan

Champions

Singles
- (Italy) Adriano Panatta

Doubles
- (Australia) Geoff Masters / (Australia) Ross Case
- Japan Open

The 1978 Fred Perry Japan Open, also known as the Japan Open Tennis Championships, was a men's tennis tournament played on outdoor clay courts in Tokyo, Japan and part of the 1978 Colgate-Palmolive Grand Prix. It was the sixth edition of the tournament and was held from 23 October through 29 October 1978. Fourth-seeded Adriano Panatta won the singles title.

== Finals ==
=== Singles ===
(Italy) Adriano Panatta defeated (United States) Pat DuPré, 6–3, 6–3

- It was Panatta's only singles title of the year and the 9th of his career.

=== Doubles ===
(Australia) Geoff Masters / (Australia) Ross Case defeated (Socialist Federal Republic of Yugoslavia) Željko Franulović / (United Kingdom) Buster Mottram, 6–2, 4–6, 6–1

- It was Masters' 4th doubles title of the year and the 19th of his career. It was Case's 1st doubles title of the year and the 16th of his career.
