= 1978 Wendy's Tennis Classic =

- Date: August 7–13
- Edition: 9th
- Category: Grand Prix
- Draw: 32S / 16D
- Prize money: $75,000
- Surface: Clay / outdoor
- Location: Columbus, Ohio, United States
- Venue: Muirfield Village

Champions

Singles
- (United States) Arthur Ashe

Doubles
- (Australia) Colin Dibley / (Australia) Bob Giltinan
- Columbus Open

The 1978 Wendy's Tennis Classic, also known as the Buckeye Championships, was a men's tennis tournament played on outdoor clay courts at the Muirfield Village in Dublin, a suburb of Columbus, Ohio in the United States that was part of the 1978 Grand Prix circuit. It was the ninth edition of the tournament and was held from August 7 through August 13, 1978. Third-seeded Arthur Ashe won the singles title and earned $12,750 first-prize money.

== Finals ==
=== Singles ===
(United States) Arthur Ashe defeated (United States) Bob Lutz 6–3, 6–4

- It was Ashe's 2nd singles title of the year and 75th of his career.

=== Doubles ===
(Australia) Colin Dibley / (Australia) Bob Giltinan defeated (Mexico) Marcello Lara / (United States) Eliot Teltscher 6–2, 6–3
