= 1978 Colgate Grand Prix of Bogota =

- Date: 13–19 November
- Edition: 2nd
- Category: Grand Prix
- Draw: 32S / 16D
- Prize money: $50,000
- Surface: Clay / outdoor
- Location: Bogotá, Colombia

Champions

Singles
- (Paraguay) Víctor Pecci

Doubles
- (Chile) Álvaro Fillol / (Chile) Jaime Fillol
- International Tennis Championships of Colombia

The 1978 Colgate Grand Prix of Bogota was a men's tennis tournament played on outdoor clay courts in Bogotá, Colombia that was part of the 1978 Colgate-Palmolive Grand Prix. It was the second edition of the tournament and was held from 13 November through 19 November 1978. Sixth-seeded Víctor Pecci won the singles title.

== Finals ==
=== Singles ===
(Paraguay) Víctor Pecci defeated (West Germany) Rolf Gehring 6–4, 3–6, 6–3, 6–3

- It was Pecci's only singles title of the year and the 3rd of his career.

=== Doubles ===
(Chile) Álvaro Fillol / (Chile) Jaime Fillol defeated (Chile) Hans Gildemeister / (Paraguay) Víctor Pecci 6–4, 6–3

- It was Álvaro Fillol's 2nd and last doubles title of the year and the 2nd of his career. It was Jaime Fillol's 2nd and last doubles title of the year and the 10th of his career.
