= 1978 South African Open (tennis) =

- Date: 27 November – 4 December
- Edition: 75th
- Category: Grand Prix
- Draw: 32S / 16D
- Prize money: $175,000
- Surface: Hard / outdoor
- Location: Johannesburg, South Africa
- Venue: Ellis Park Tennis Stadium

Champions

Singles
- (United States) Tim Gullikson

Doubles
- (United States) Peter Fleming / (South Africa) Ray Moore
- South African Open

The 1978 South African Open was a men's tennis tournament played on outdoor hard courts in Johannesburg, South Africa that was part of the 1978 Colgate-Palmolive Grand Prix circuit. It was the 75th edition of the tournament and was held from 27 November through 4 December 1978. Second-seeded Tim Gullikson won the singles title.

== Finals ==
=== Singles ===
(United States) Tim Gullikson defeated (United States) Harold Solomon 2–6, 7–6, 7–6, 6–7, 6–4

=== Doubles ===
(United States) Peter Fleming / (South Africa) Ray Moore defeated (South Africa) Bob Hewitt / (South Africa) Frew McMillan 6–3, 7–6
