= 1978 Fairfield Bay Classic =

- Date: January 30 – February 5
- Edition: 5th
- Category: Grand Prix
- Draw: 32S / 16D
- Prize money: $50,000
- Surface: Hard / indoor
- Location: North Little Rock, AR, US
- Venue: Burns Park

Champions

Singles
- (United States) Dick Stockton

Doubles
- (Australia) Colin Dibley / (Australia) Geoff Masters
- Arkansas International Tennis Tournament

The 1978 Fairfield Bay Classic, also known as the Arkansas International, was a men's tennis tournament played on indoor hardcourts at Burns Park in North Little Rock, Arkansas in the United States that was part of the 1978 Grand Prix circuit. It was the fifth edition of the event and was held from January 30 through February 5, 1978. First-seeded Dick Stockton won the singles title and earned $10,000 first-prize money.

== Finals ==
=== Singles ===
(United States) Dick Stockton defeated (United States) Hank Pfister 6–4, 3–5, retired

- It was Stockton's 1st singles title of the year and the 8th and last of his career.

=== Doubles ===
(Australia) Colin Dibley / (Australia) Geoff Masters defeated (United States) Tim Gullikson / (United States) Tom Gullikson 7–6, 6–3
