= 1978 Mexico City WCT =

- Date: 30 January – 5 February
- Edition: 3rd
- Category: Grand Prix (WCT)
- Draw: 32S / 16D
- Prize money: $50,000
- Surface: Carpet (indoors)
- Location: Mexico City, Mexico

Champions

Singles
- (Mexico) Raúl Ramírez

Doubles
- (India) Sashi Menon / (United States) Gene Mayer
- Mexico City WCT

The 1978 Mexico City WCT was a men's tennis tournament played on indoor carpet courts in Mexico City, Mexico. The event was part of the World Championship Tennis series of tournaments that were incorporated into the 1978 Grand Prix circuit. It was the third edition of the tournament and was held from 30 January until 5 February 1978. First-seeded Raúl Ramírez won the singles title, his second at the event after 1976.

== Finals ==
=== Singles ===
(Mexico) Raúl Ramírez defeated (United States) Pat DuPré, 6–4, 6–1

- It was Ramírez' 1st singles title of the year and the 14th of his career.

=== Doubles ===
(India) Sashi Menon / (United States) Gene Mayer defeated (Mexico) Marcello Lara / (Mexico) Raúl Ramírez, 6–3, 7–6
