= 1978 Bank of Oklahoma Grand Prix =

- Date: April 24–30
- Edition: 1st
- Category: Grand Prix
- Draw: 32S / 16D
- Prize money: $50,000
- Surface: Hard / outdoor
- Location: Tulsa, Oklahoma, U.S.
- Venue: Shadow Mountain Racquet Club

Champions

Singles
- (United States) Eddie Dibbs

Doubles
- (United States) Van Winitsky / (New Zealand) Russell Simpson
Tulsa Grand Prix Tennis Tournament	· 1979 →

The 1978 Bank of Oklahoma Grand Prix was a men's tennis tournament played on outdoor hard courts at the Shadow Mountain Racquet Club in Tulsa, Oklahoma in the United States that was part of the 1978 Colgate-Palmolive Grand Prix. It was the inaugural edition of the tournament was held from April 24 through April 30, 1978. Eddie Dibbs won the singles title and earned $8,500 first-prize money.

== Finals ==
=== Singles ===
(United States) Eddie Dibbs defeated (United States) Pat DuPré 6–7, 6–2, 7–5

- It was Dibbs' 1st singles title of the year and the 14th of his career.

=== Doubles ===
(United States) Van Winitsky / (New Zealand) Russell Simpson defeated (Brazil) Carlos Kirmayr / (Ecuador) Ricardo Ycaza 4–6, 7–6, 6–2
