= 1978 Cathay Trust Championships =

- Date: 13–19 November
- Edition: 2nd
- Category: Grand Prix
- Draw: 32S / 16D
- Prize money: $50,000
- Surface: Carpet / indoor
- Location: Taipei, Taiwan

Champions

Singles
- (United States) Brian Teacher

Doubles
- (United States) Butch Walts / (United States) Sherwood Stewart
- Taipei Grand Prix

The 1978 Cathay Trust Championships was a men's tennis tournament played on indoor carpet courts in Taipei, Taiwan that was part of the 1978 Colgate-Palmolive Grand Prix. It was the second edition of the tournament and was held from 13 November through 19 November 1978. Second-seeded Brian Teacher won the singles title.

== Finals ==
=== Singles ===
(United States) Brian Teacher defeated (United States) Tom Gorman 6–3, 6–3, 6–3

- It was Teacher's 1st singles title of the year and the 2nd of his career.

=== Doubles ===
(United States) Butch Walts / (United States) Sherwood Stewart defeated (Australia) Mark Edmondson / (United States) John Marks 6–2, 6–7, 7–6
