= 1978 Cologne Cup =

Tennis cup

- Date: 30 October – 5 November
- Edition: 3rd
- Category: Grand Prix
- Draw: 32S / 16D
- Prize money: $75,000
- Surface: Carpet / indoor
- Location: Cologne, West Germany

Champions

Singles
- (Poland) Wojciech Fibak

Doubles
- (United States) Peter Fleming / (United States) John McEnroe
- Cologne Grand Prix

The 1978 Cologne Cup, also known as the Cologne Grand Prix, was a men's tennis tournament played on indoor carpet courts in Cologne, West Germany that was part of the 1978 Colgate-Palmolive Grand Prix circuit. It was the third edition of the tournament and was held from 30 October through 5 November 1978. Fourth-seeded Wojciech Fibak won the singles title and the accompanying $10,000 first-prize money

== Finals ==
=== Singles ===
(Poland) Wojciech Fibak defeated (India) Vijay Amritraj 6–2, 0–1, ret.

- It was Fibak's 1st singles title of the year and the 6th of his career.

=== Doubles ===
(United States) Peter Fleming / (United States) John McEnroe defeated (South Africa) Bob Hewitt / (South Africa) Frew McMillan 6–3, 6–2
