= 1978 Custom Credit Australian Indoor Championships =

- Date: 16–22 October
- Edition: 6th
- Category: Grand Prix circuit (Four star)
- Draw: 32S / 16D
- Prize money: $175,000
- Location: Sydney, Australia
- Venue: Hordern Pavilion

Champions

Singles
- (United States) Jimmy Connors

Doubles
- (Australia) John Newcombe / (Australia) Tony Roche
- Australian Indoor Tennis Championships

The 1978 Custom Credit Australian Indoor Championships was a men's tennis tournament played on indoor hard courts at the Hordern Pavilion in Sydney, Australia and was part of the 1978 Colgate-Palmolive Grand Prix. The tournament was held from 16 October through 22 October 1978. First-seeded Jimmy Connors won the singles title.

== Finals ==
=== Singles ===
(United States) Jimmy Connors defeated (Australia) Geoff Masters 6–0, 6–0, 6–4

- It was Connors' 10th title of the year and the 84th of his career.

=== Doubles ===
(Australia) John Newcombe / (Australia) Tony Roche defeated (Australia) Mark Edmondson / (Australia) John Marks 6–4, 6–3

- It was Newcombe's only title of the year and the 65th of his career. It was Roche's 2nd title of the year and the 27th of his career.
