= 1978 Lagos Classic =

- Date: 27 February – 5 March
- Edition: 2nd
- Category: Grand Prix (WCT)
- Draw: 32S / 16D
- Prize money: $50,000
- Surface: Hard / outdoor
- Location: Lagos, Nigeria
- Venue: Lagos Lawn Tennis Club

Champions

Singles
- (Sweden) Kjell Johansson

Doubles
- (India) Sashi Menon / (United States) George Hardie
- Lagos Open

The 1978 Lagos Classic was a men's tennis tournament played on outdoor hard courts at the Lagos Lawn Tennis Club in Lagos, Nigeria. The event was part of the World Championship Tennis tier of the 1978 Grand Prix circuit. It was the second edition of the tournament and was held from 27 February until 5 March 1978. Third-seeded Kjell Johansson won the singles title.

== Finals ==
=== Singles ===
(Sweden) Kjell Johansson defeated (United Kingdom) Robin Drysdale, 9–8, 6–3

- It was Johansson's only singles title of his career.

=== Doubles ===
(India) Sashi Menon / (United States) George Hardie defeated (Switzerland) Colin Dowdeswell / (West Germany) Jürgen Fassbender 6–3, 3–6, 7–5
