= 1978 Benson & Hedges Championships – Singles =

Singles
- 1978 Benson & Hedges Championships

Final
- Champion: (United States) John McEnroe
- Runner-up: (United States) Tim Gullikson
- Score: 6–7, 6–4, 7–6, 6–2

Details
- Draw: 32
- Seeds: 8

Events
Singles	Doubles
- Wembley Championships

The 1978 Benson & Hedges Championships – Singles was an event of the 1978 Benson & Hedges Championships tennis tournament and was played on iindoor carpet courts at the Wembley Arena in London in the United Kingdom, between 14 November and 18 November 1978. The draw comprised 32 players and eight of them were seeded. Björn Borg was the defending Wembley Championships singles champion but did not participate in this edition. Third-seeded John McEnroe won the singles title after a win in the final against unseeded Tim Gullikson, 6–7, 6–4, 7–6, 6–2.

== Seeds ==
1. (United States) Vitas Gerulaitis (second round)
2. (United States) Eddie Dibbs (second round)
3. (United States) John McEnroe (champion)
4. (United States) Brian Gottfried (second round)
5. (Italy) Corrado Barazzutti (quarterfinals)
6. (United States) Sandy Mayer (quarterfinals)
7. (United States) Harold Solomon (second round)
8. (United States) Roscoe Tanner (second round)

== Draw ==
Key

- Q = Qualifier
- WC = Wild card
- LL = Lucky loser
- Alt = Alternate
- ITF = ITF entry
- PR = Protected ranking
- SR = Special ranking
- SE = Special exempt
- JE = Junior exempt
- JR = Junior Accelerator Programme entrant
- CO = College Accelerator Programme entrant
- NG = Next Gen Accelerator Program entrant
- w/o = Walkover
- r = Retired
- d = Defaulted

=== Finals ===
Semifinals
(United States) Tim Gullikson	w/o
(United States) Arthur Ashe
3	(United States) John McEnroe	6	6
(United States) Dick Stockton	4	3

Final
(United States) Tim Gullikson	7	4	6	2
3	(United States) John McEnroe	6	6	7	6

=== Top half ===
First Round
1	(United States) Vitas Gerulaitis	7	6
(Switzerland) Heinz Günthardt	5	3
(Czechoslovakia) Vladimír Zedník	7	6	2
(United States) Tim Gullikson	6	7	6
(United Kingdom) Mark Cox	6	6
(Poland) Wojciech Fibak	2	4
(South Africa) Bernard Mitton	2	6
6	(United States) Sandy Mayer	6	7
4	(United States) Brian Gottfried	7	6
(United Kingdom) Richard Lewis	6	0
(United States) Stan Smith	6	6
(United Kingdom) John Lloyd	3	4
(United States) Victor Amaya	6	6	3
(United States) Arthur Ashe	2	7	6
(United States) Eliot Teltscher	2	2
7	(United States) Harold Solomon	6	6

Second Round
1	(United States) Vitas Gerulaitis	4	7	3
(United States) Tim Gullikson	6	5	6
(United Kingdom) Mark Cox	1	5
6	(United States) Sandy Mayer	6	7
4	(United States) Brian Gottfried	4	6	3
(United States) Stan Smith	6	3	6
(United States) Arthur Ashe	2	6	6
7	(United States) Harold Solomon	6	4	1

Quarterfinals
(United States) Tim Gullikson	6	6
6	(United States) Sandy Mayer	2	2
(United States) Stan Smith	3	2
(United States) Arthur Ashe	6	6

Semifinals
(United States) Tim Gullikson	w/o
(United States) Arthur Ashe

=== Bottom half ===
First Round
5	(Italy) Corrado Barazzutti	6	6
(United States) Bob Lutz	0	1
(Romania) Ilie Năstase	6	6
(United States) Peter Fleming	3	4
(West Germany) Karl Meiler	1	3
(Netherlands) Tom Okker	6	6
(United Kingdom) David Lloyd	4	2
3	(United States) John McEnroe	6	6
8	(United States) Roscoe Tanner	6	6	9
(United States) Tom Gullikson	3	7	7
(United States) Dick Stockton	6	6
(Czechoslovakia) Tomáš Šmíd	1	4
(Hungary) Balázs Taróczy	1	6	5
(Italy) Adriano Panatta	6	4	7
(South Africa) Frew McMillan	3	0
2	(United States) Eddie Dibbs	6	6

Second Round
5	(Italy) Corrado Barazzutti	6	6	6
(Romania) Ilie Năstase	3	7	3
(Netherlands) Tom Okker	2	3
3	(United States) John McEnroe	6	6
8	(United States) Roscoe Tanner	3	4
(United States) Dick Stockton	6	6
(Italy) Adriano Panatta	6	6
2	(United States) Eddie Dibbs	1	3

Quarterfinals
5	(Italy) Corrado Barazzutti	0	6
3	(United States) John McEnroe	6	7
(United States) Dick Stockton	6	4	8
(Italy) Adriano Panatta	3	6	6

Semifinals
3	(United States) John McEnroe	6	6
(United States) Dick Stockton	4	3
