= 1978 South Pacific Championships =

- Date: 9–16 October
- Edition: 5th
- Category: Grand Prix
- Draw: 32S / 16D
- Prize money: $50,000
- Surface: Grass / outdoor
- Location: Brisbane, Queensland, Australia
- Venue: Milton Courts

Champions

Singles
- (Australia) Mark Edmondson

Doubles
- (Australia) Phil Dent / (Australia) John Alexander
| ← 1977 · | South Pacific Tennis Classic | · 1979 → |

The 1978 South Pacific Championships was an Association of Tennis Professionals men's tournament held on outdoor grass courts at the Milton Courts in Brisbane, Queensland, Australia that was part of the 1978 Grand Prix tennis circuit. It was the fifth edition of the tournament and was held from 9 October until 16 October 1978. The final was postponed from Sunday to Monday due to rain. Unseeded Mark Edmondson won the singles title, his second at the event after 1976.

== Finals ==
=== Singles ===
(Australia) Mark Edmondson defeated (Australia) John Alexander 6–4, 7–6

- It was Edmondson's 1st singles title of the year and the 3rd of his career.

=== Doubles ===
(Australia) Phil Dent / (Australia) John Alexander defeated (Australia) Syd Ball / (Australia) Allan Stone 6–3, 7–6
