= 1978 Benson & Hedges Championships =

- Date: 14–18 November
- Edition: 3rd
- Category: Grand Prix
- Draw: 32S / 16D
- Prize money: $175,000
- Surface: Carpet / indoor
- Location: London, England
- Venue: Wembley Arena

Champions

Singles
- (United States) John McEnroe

Doubles
- (United States) Peter Fleming / (United States) John McEnroe
- Wembley Championships

The 1978 Benson & Hedges Championships, also known as the Wembley Championships, was a men's tennis tournament played on indoor carpet courts at the Wembley Arena in London in the United Kingdom that was part of the 1978 Colgate-Palmolive Grand Prix. The tournament was held from 14 November until 18 November 1978. Third-seeded John McEnroe won the singles title.

== Finals ==
=== Singles ===
(United States) John McEnroe defeated (United States) Tim Gullikson 6–7, 6–4, 7–6, 6–2

- It was McEnroe's 4th singles title of the year and of his career.

=== Doubles ===
(United States) Peter Fleming / (United States) John McEnroe defeated (South Africa) Bob Hewitt / (South Africa) Frew McMillan 7–6, 4–6, 6–4
