= 1978 Berlin Open =

- Date: 19–25 June
- Edition: 4th
- Category: Grand Prix
- Draw: 32S / 16D
- Prize money: $50,000
- Surface: Clay / outdoor
- Location: Berlin, West Germany

Champions

Singles
- (Czechoslovakia) Vladimír Zedník

Doubles
- (West Germany) Jürgen Fassbender / (Switzerland) Colin Dowdeswell
- Berlin Open

The 1978 Berlin Open, also known as the International Championships of Berlin, was a men's tennis tournament staged in Berlin, West Germany that was part of the Grand Prix circuit. The tournament was played on outdoor clay courts and was held from 19 June until 25 June 1978. It was the fourth edition of the tournament and fifth-seeded Vladimír Zedník won the singles title.

== Finals ==
=== Singles ===
(Czechoslovakia) Vladimír Zedník defeated (West Germany) Harald Elschenbroich 6–4, 7–5, 6–2

- It was Zedník's only singles title of his career.

=== Doubles ===
(West Germany) Jürgen Fassbender / (Switzerland) Colin Dowdeswell defeated (Socialist Federal Republic of Yugoslavia) Željko Franulović / (Chile) Hans Gildemeister 6–3, 6–4
