= 1979 South Pacific Classic =

- Date: 8–14 October
- Edition: 6th
- Category: Grand Prix
- Draw: 32S / 16D
- Prize money: $50,000
- Surface: Grass / outdoor
- Location: Brisbane, Queensland, Australia
- Venue: Milton Courts

Champions

Singles
- (Australia) Phil Dent

Doubles
- (Australia) Geoff Masters / (Australia) Ross Case
| ← 1978 · | South Pacific Tennis Classic | · 1980 → |

The 1979 South Pacific Classic was an Association of Tennis Professionals men's tournament held on outdoor grass courts at the Milton Courts in Brisbane, Queensland, Australia that was part of the 1979 Grand Prix tennis circuit. It was the sixth edition of the tournament and was held from 8 October until 14 October 1979. Unseeded Phil Dent won the singles title.

== Finals ==
=== Singles ===
(Australia) Phil Dent defeated (Australia) Ross Case 7–6, 6–2, 6–3

- It was Dent's 1st singles title of the year and the 2nd of his career.

=== Doubles ===
(Australia) Geoff Masters / (Australia) Ross Case defeated (Australia) John James / (Australia) Chris Kachel 7–6, 6–2
