= 1978 Mercedes Cup =

- Date: 17–23 July 1978
- Edition: 1st
- Category: Grand Prix
- Draw: 32S / 16D
- Prize money: $50,000
- Surface: Clay / outdoor
- Location: Stuttgart, West Germany
- Venue: Tennis Club Weissenhof

Champions

Singles
- (West Germany) Ulrich Pinner

Doubles
- (Czechoslovakia) Tomáš Šmíd / (Czechoslovakia) Jan Kodeš
- Stuttgart Open

The 1978 Mercedes Cup, was a men's tennis tournament played on outdoor clay courts and held at the Tennis Club Weissenhof in Stuttgart, West Germany that was part of the 1978 Grand Prix circuit. It was the inaugural edition of the tournament and was held from 17 July until 23 July 1978. Unseeded Ulrich Pinner won the singles title.

== Finals ==
=== Singles ===
(West Germany) Ulrich Pinner defeated (Australia) Kim Warwick, 6–2, 6–2, 7–6

- It was Pinner's first singles title of his career.

=== Doubles ===
(Czechoslovakia) Tomáš Šmíd / (Czechoslovakia) Jan Kodeš defeated (Brazil) Carlos Kirmayr / (Chile) Belus Prajoux, 6–3, 7–6
