= 1978 Custom Credit Australian Indoor Championships – Singles =

Singles
- 1978 Custom Credit Australian Indoor Championships

Final
- Champion: (United States) Jimmy Connors
- Runner-up: (Australia) Geoff Masters
- Score: 6–0, 6–0, 6–4

Details
- Draw: 32
- Seeds: 8

Events
Singles	Doubles
- Australian Indoor Tennis Championships

Jimmy Connors was the defending champion and won in the final 6–0, 6–0, 6–4 against Geoff Masters.

== Seeds ==
1. (United States) Jimmy Connors (champion)
2. (Mexico) Raúl Ramírez (first round)
3. (United States) Arthur Ashe (second round)
4. (Australia) John Alexander (first round)
5. (Australia) Tony Roche (first round)
6. (United States) Tom Gorman (second round)
7. (Australia) John Newcombe (semifinals)
8. (Australia) Ken Rosewall (quarterfinals)

== Draw ==
Key

- Q = Qualifier
- WC = Wild card
- LL = Lucky loser
- Alt = Alternate
- ITF = ITF entry
- PR = Protected ranking
- SR = Special ranking
- SE = Special exempt
- JE = Junior exempt
- JR = Junior Accelerator Programme entrant
- CO = College Accelerator Programme entrant
- NG = Next Gen Accelerator Program entrant
- w/o = Walkover
- r = Retired
- d = Defaulted

Semifinals
1	(United States) Jimmy Connors	6	6
(United States) Pat Du Pré	3	1
(Australia) Geoff Masters	6	6
8	(Australia) Ken Rosewall	2	3

Final
1	(United States) Jimmy Connors	6	6	6
(Australia) Geoff Masters	0	0	4

=== Section 1 ===
First round
1	(United States) J Connors	6	6
(Australia) C Dibley	4	1
(Australia) B Giltinan	2	6
(Australia) M Edmondson	6	7
(Australia) P McNamara	7	6
(Australia) J Marks	6	1
(United States) F McNair	6	5	2
7	(Australia) J Newcombe	3	7	6
3	(United States) A Ashe	7	6
(Australia) K Warwick	6	3
(India) S Menon	3	4
(United States) P Du Pré	6	6
(Australia) A Stone	7	4	4
(United States) S Stewart	5	6	6
(United States) N Saviano	7	7
5	(Australia) T Roche	6	6

Second round
1	(United States) J Connors	6	6
(Australia) M Edmondson	2	2
(Australia) P McNamara	1	4
7	(Australia) J Newcombe	6	6
3	(United States) A Ashe	3	1
(United States) P Du Pré	6	6
(United States) S Stewart	7	6
(United States) N Saviano	6	2

Quarterfinals
1	(United States) J Connors	6	7
7	(Australia) J Newcombe	4	6
(United States) P Du Pré	6	6	6
(United States) S Stewart	7	3	2

Semifinals
1	(United States) J Connors	6	6
(United States) P Du Pré	3	1

=== Section 2 ===
First round
6	(United States) T Gorman	6	6
(United States) E Teltscher	4	4
(Australia) L Hall	1	4
(Australia) T Rocavert	6	6
(Australia) C Kachel	2	4
(Australia) G Masters	6	6
(United States) H Pfister	6	4	6
4	(Australia) J Alexander	2	6	2
8	(Australia) K Rosewall	6	6
(Australia) D Crealy	1	4
(United States) B Walts	6	6	1
(Australia) B Drewett	7	4	6
(Australia) R Kelly	4	2
(Australia) P Dent	6	6
(Australia) R Case	6	3	6
2	(Mexico) R Ramírez	4	6	4

Second round
6	(United States) T Gorman	5	1
(Australia) T Rocavert	7	6
(Australia) G Masters	6	6
(United States) H Pfister	4	4
8	(Australia) K Rosewall	6	6
(Australia) B Drewett	0	4
(Australia) P Dent	6	7	6
(Australia) R Case	7	6	4

Quarterfinals
(Australia) T Rocavert	0	1
(Australia) G Masters	6	6
8	(Australia) K Rosewall	6	3	6
(Australia) P Dent	1	6	3

Semifinals
(Australia) G Masters	6	6
8	(Australia) K Rosewall	2	3
