= 1978 Dutch Open (tennis) =

- Date: 24–30 July
- Edition: 21st
- Category: Grand Prix
- Draw: 32S / 16D
- Prize money: $75,000
- Surface: Clay / outdoor
- Location: Hilversum, Netherlands
- Venue: 't Melkhuisje

Champions

Singles
- (Hungary) Balázs Taróczy

Doubles
- (Netherlands) Tom Okker / (Hungary) Balázs Taróczy
- Dutch Open

The 1978 Dutch Open was a Grand Prix men's tennis tournament staged in Hilversum, Netherlands. The tournament was played on outdoor clay courts and was held from 24 July until 30 July 1978. It was the 21st edition of the tournament. Third-seeded Balázs Taróczy won the singles title, his second at the event after 1976.

== Finals ==
=== Singles ===
(Hungary) Balázs Taróczy defeated (Netherlands) Tom Okker 2–6, 6–1, 6–2, 6–4

- It was Taróczy's first singles title of the year and the third of his career.

=== Doubles ===
(Netherlands) Tom Okker / (Hungary) Balázs Taróczy defeated (Australia) Bob Carmichael / (Australia) Mark Edmondson 7–6, 4–6, 7–5
