= 1978 Custom Credit Australian Indoor Championships – Doubles =

Doubles
- 1978 Custom Credit Australian Indoor Championships

Final
- Champions: (Australia) John Newcombe (Australia) Tony Roche
- Runners-up: (Australia) Mark Edmondson (Australia) John Marks
- Score: 6–4, 6–3

Details
- Draw: 16
- Seeds: 4

Events
Singles	Doubles
- Australian Indoor Tennis Championships

John Newcombe and Tony Roche were the defending champions and won in the final 6–4, 6–3 against Mark Edmondson and John Marks.

== Seeds ==
1. (United States) Fred McNair / (Mexico) Raúl Ramírez (first round)
2. (Australia) John Alexander / (Australia) Phil Dent (first round)
3. (Australia) Syd Ball / (Australia) Allan Stone (first round)
4. (Australia) Colin Dibley / (Australia) Kim Warwick (semifinals)

== Draw ==
Key

- Q = Qualifier
- WC = Wild card
- LL = Lucky loser
- Alt = Alternate
- ITF = ITF entry
- PR = Protected ranking
- SR = Special ranking
- SE = Special exempt
- JE = Junior exempt
- JR = Junior Accelerator Programme entrant
- CO = College Accelerator Programme entrant
- NG = Next Gen Accelerator Program entrant
- w/o = Walkover
- r = Retired
- d = Defaulted

First round
1	(United States) F McNair (Mexico) R Ramírez	3	3
(Australia) M Edmondson (Australia) J Marks	6	6
(United States) S Stewart (United States) B Walts	6	6
(United States) P Du Pré (Australia) P McNamara	1	4
4	(Australia) C Dibley (Australia) K Warwick	7	6
(Australia) D Crealy (Australia) B Giltinan	5	2
(United States) T Gorman (United States) H Pfister	7	6
(United States) N Saviano (United States) E Teltscher	6	2
(Australia) B Drewett (Australia) T Rocavert	2	6
(Australia) J Newcombe (Australia) T Roche	6	7
(United States) A Ashe (Australia) K Rosewall	7	6
3	(Australia) S Ball (Australia) A Stone	6	2
(Australia) C Kachel (India) S Menon	6	7
(Australia) L Hall (Australia) R Kelly	3	6
(Australia) R Case (Australia) G Masters	6	6	6
2	(Australia) J Alexander (Australia) P Dent	2	7	1

Quarterfinals
(Australia) M Edmondson (Australia) J Marks	6	7
(United States) S Stewart (United States) B Walts	4	6
4	(Australia) C Dibley (Australia) K Warwick	4	6	6
(United States) T Gorman (United States) H Pfister	6	3	3
(Australia) J Newcombe (Australia) T Roche	7	7
(United States) A Ashe (Australia) K Rosewall	6	6
(Australia) C Kachel (India) S Menon	6	6	6
(Australia) R Case (Australia) G Masters	7	3	3

Semifinals
(Australia) M Edmondson (Australia) J Marks	4	7	6
4	(Australia) C Dibley (Australia) K Warwick	6	6	4
(Australia) J Newcombe (Australia) T Roche	6	6
(Australia) C Kachel (India) S Menon	3	3

Final
(Australia) M Edmondson (Australia) J Marks	4	3
(Australia) J Newcombe (Australia) T Roche	6	6
