= 1978 Pacific Southwest Open =

- Date: September 18–25
- Edition: 52nd
- Category: Grand Prix
- Draw: 64S / 32D
- Prize money: $200,000
- Surface: Carpet / indoor
- Location: Los Angeles, US
- Venue: Pauley Pavilion

Champions

Singles
- (United States) Arthur Ashe

Doubles
- (Australia) John Alexander / (Australia) Phil Dent
- Pacific Southwest Open

The 1978 Pacific Southwest Open, also known under its sponsorship name 1978 ARCO Open, was a men's tennis tournament played on indoor carpet courts at the Pauley Pavilion in Los Angeles, California in the United States. The event was part of the Grand Prix tennis circuit. It was the 52nd edition of the tournament and was held from September 18 through September 25, 1978. Seventh-seeded Arthur Ashe won the singles title as well as 200 ranking points.

== Finals ==
=== Singles ===
(United States) Arthur Ashe defeated (United States) Brian Gottfried 6–2, 6–4

=== Doubles ===
(Australia) John Alexander / (Australia) Phil Dent defeated (United States) Fred McNair / (Mexico) Raúl Ramírez 7–6, 6–3
