= 1978 Louisville Open =

- Date: July 24–30
- Edition: 9th
- Category: Grand Prix
- Draw: 64S / 32D
- Prize money: $175,000
- Surface: Clay / outdoor
- Location: Louisville, Kentucky, U.S.
- Venue: Louisville Tennis Center

Champions

Singles
- (United States) Harold Solomon

Doubles
- (Paraguay) Víctor Pecci / (Poland) Wojciech Fibak
- Louisville Open

The 1978 Louisville Open, also known as the Louisville International Tennis Classic, was a men's tennis tournament played on outdoor clay courts at the Louisville Tennis Center in Louisville, Kentucky, United States. It was the ninth edition of the tournament and was held from July 25 through July 30, 1978. The tournament was part of the Grand Prix tennis circuit. The singles final was won by fifth-seeded Harold Solomon who received $24,000 first prize money and earned 175 ranking points. It was Solomon's second title win at the tournament after 1976.

== Finals ==
=== Singles ===
(United States) Harold Solomon defeated (Australia) John Alexander 6–2, 6–2

- It was Solomon's 2nd singles title of the year and the 15th of his career.

=== Doubles ===
(Paraguay) Víctor Pecci / (Poland) Wojciech Fibak defeated (United States) Victor Amaya / (Australia) John James 6–4, 6–7, 6–4
