= Corrado Barazzutti =

Italian tennis player

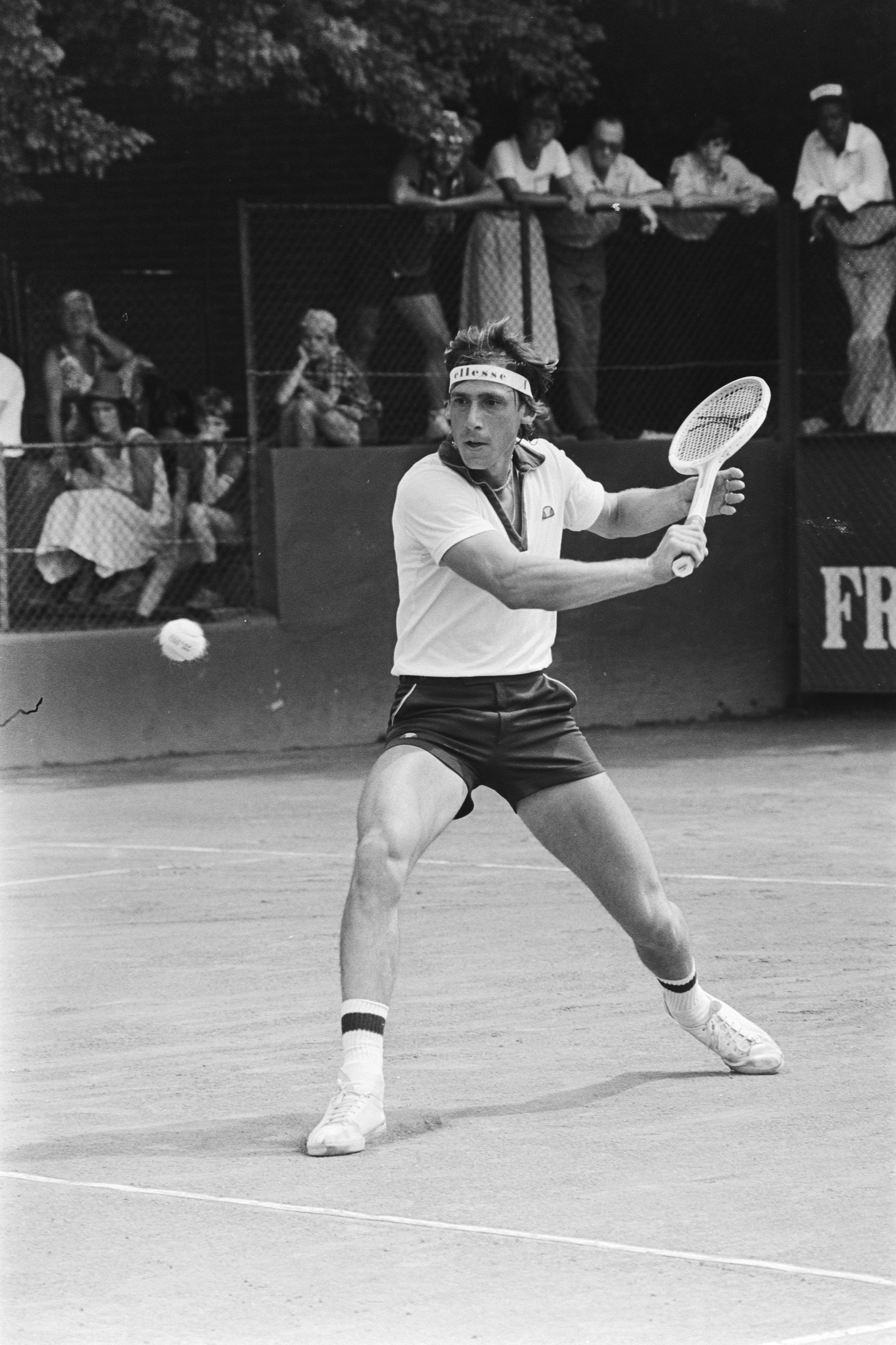
- Barazzutti playing Australian David Carter in the third round of the 1978 Dutch Open in Hilversum.
- Country (sports): Italy
- Residence: Rome, Italy
- Born: 19 February 1953 (age 73) Udine, Italy
- Height: 1.78 m (5 ft 10 in)
- Turned pro: 1971
- Retired: 1984
- Plays: Right-handed (one-handed backhand)
- Prize money: $775,783

Singles
- Career record: 317–231
- Career titles: 5
- Highest ranking: No. 7 (21 August 1978)

Grand Slam singles results
- French Open: SF (1978)
- Wimbledon: 2R (1980)
- US Open: SF (1977)

Other tournaments
- Tour Finals: RR (1978)
- WCT Finals: SF (1978)

Doubles
- Career record: 57–111
- Career titles: 1

Team competitions
- Davis Cup: W (1976)

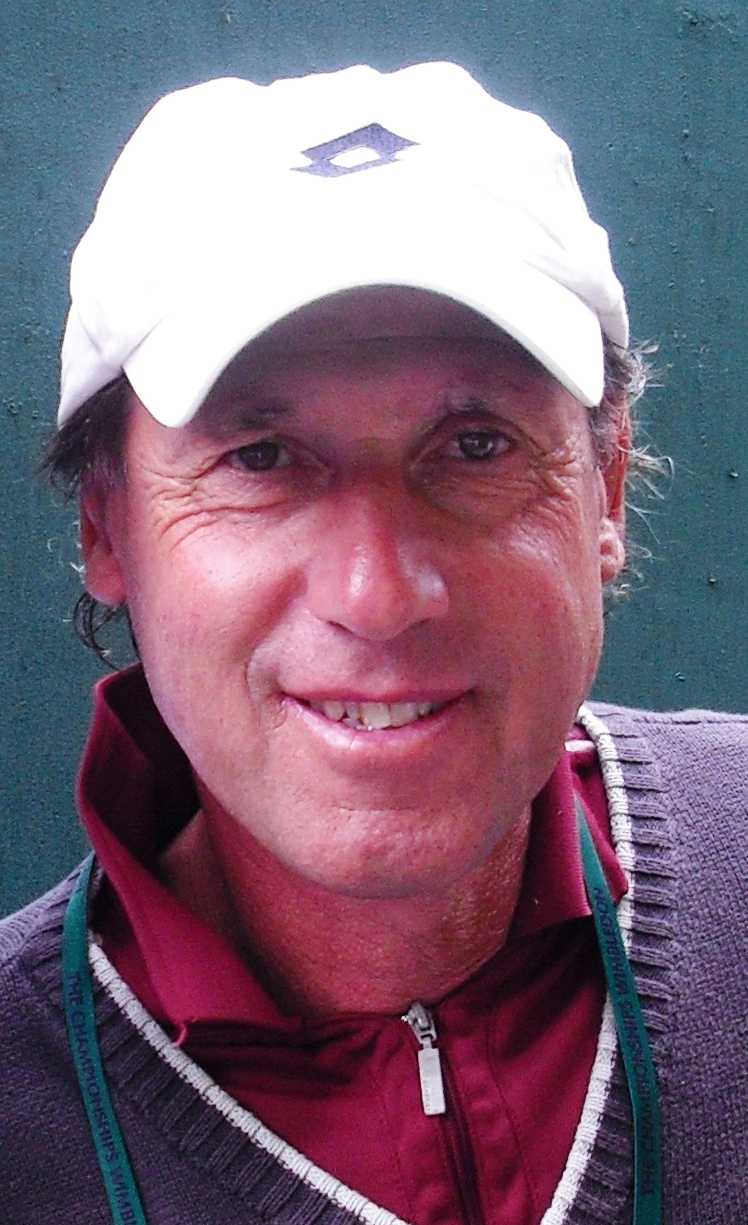
Barazzutti at the Rome Masters in 2011.

Corrado Barazzutti (Italian pronunciation: [korˈraːdo baratˈtsutti]; born 19 February 1953) is a former tennis player from Italy. His career-high singles ranking was world No. 7, achieved in August 1978.

After the end of his player career Barazzutti was a non-playing captain of the Italy Davis Cup team and the Italy Fed Cup team. He was the captain when the Italian team won the Fed Cup (now known as Billie Jean King Cup) four times: 2006, 2009, 2010 and 2013.

== Career ==
=== As player ===
Barazzutti gained fame in 1971 by winning the Orange Bowl and the French Open Boys' Singles, and he turned professional in the same year. He had been called to the Italy Davis Cup team the previous year, an event which he played a total of 44 matches. In 1976, Barazzutti was a member of the Italian Davis Cup team who won the Davis Cup in and against Chile.

In Grand Slam tournaments, his best results are the semifinals in 1977 at the US Open and in 1978 at the French Open; he was beaten in straight sets by Jimmy Connors and Björn Borg respectively. Barazzutti won five career ATP tournaments in singles as well as one in doubles.

==== Singles finals (5 titles, 8 runners-up) ====
Legend
Grand Slam (0–0)
Grand Prix Masters (0–0)
Grand Prix (5–8)

Result	W/L	Date	Tournament	Surface	Opponent	Score
Loss	0–1	Nov 1975	Manila, Philippines	Hard	(Australia) Ross Case	2–6, 1–6
Win	1–1	Apr 1976	Nice, France	Clay	(Czechoslovakia) Jan Kodeš	6–2, 2–6, 5–7, 7–6, 8–6
Loss	1–2	Jul 1976	Båstad, Sweden	Clay	(Italy) Tonino Zugarelli	6–4, 5–7, 2–6
Loss	1–3	Nov 1976	Tokyo, Japan	Hard	(United States) Roscoe Tanner	3–6, 2–6
Loss	1–4	Apr 1977	Monte Carlo, Monaco	Clay	(Sweden) Björn Borg	3–6, 5–7, 0–6
Win	2–4	Apr 1977	Charlotte WCT, U.S.	Clay	(United States) Eddie Dibbs	7–6, 6–0
Win	3–4	Jul 1977	Båstad, Sweden	Clay	(Hungary) Balázs Taróczy	7–6, 6–7, 6–2
Win	4–4	Nov 1977	Paris, France	Hard (i)	(United States) Brian Gottfried	7–6, 7–6, 6–7, 3–6, 6–4
Loss	4–5	Apr 1978	Las Vegas, U.S.	Hard	(United States) Harold Solomon	1–6, 0–3, ret.
Loss	4–6	Jul 1978	Båstad, Sweden	Clay	(Sweden) Björn Borg	1–6, 2–6
Loss	4–7	Sep 1979	Palermo, Italy	Clay	(Sweden) Björn Borg	4–6, 0–6, 4–6
Loss	4–8	Nov 1979	Paris, France	Hard (i)	(United States) Harold Solomon	3–6, 6–2, 3–6, 4–6
Win	5–8	Mar 1980	Cairo, Egypt	Clay	(Italy) Paolo Bertolucci	6–4, 6–0

==== Doubles finals (1 title, 5 runners-up) ====
Result	W/L	Date	Tournament	Surface	Partner	Opponents	Score
Loss	0–1	May 1974	Bournemouth, UK	Clay	(Italy) Paolo Bertolucci	(Spain) Juan Gisbert (Romania) Ilie Năstase	4–6, 2–6, 0–6
Loss	0–2	Mar 1975	Munich WCT, Germany	Carpet (i)	(Italy) Tonino Zugarelli	(South Africa) Bob Hewitt (South Africa) Frew McMillan	3–6, 4–6
Loss	0–3	Mar 1976	Valencia, Spain	Clay	(Italy) Tonino Zugarelli	(Spain) Juan Gisbert Sr. (Spain) Manuel Orantes	1–6, 4–6
Loss	0–4	Nov 1976	Manila, Philippines	Hard	(India) Anand Amritraj	(Australia) Ross Case (Australia) Geoff Masters	0–6, 1–6
Loss	0–5	Apr 1977	Charlotte WCT, U.S.	Clay	(Italy) Adriano Panatta	(Netherlands) Tom Okker (Australia) Ken Rosewall	1–6, 6–3, 6–7
Win	1–5	May 1978	Florence, Italy	Clay	(Italy) Adriano Panatta	(Australia) Mark Edmondson (Australia) John Marks	6–3, 6–7, 6–3

=== As coach ===
In 2002 Barazzutti was appointed coach and, until 2017, non-player captain of the Fed Cup women's team. Under Barazzutti's guidance, the team has won the Fed Cup four times (2006, 2009, 2010, 2013). Until 2020 Barazzutti coached the men's Davis Cup too. In 2020 he coached for a brief period of time Italian tennis player Fabio Fognini.

== See also ==
- Tennis in Italy
