= Guillermo Vilas career statistics =

These are the main career statistics of former Argentine professional tennis player Guillermo Vilas, whose playing career lasted from 1968 through 1992.

== ATP Tour performance timeline ==
Key
W	F	SF	QF	#R	RR	Q#	DNQ	A	NH

(W) winner; (F) finalist; (SF) semifinalist; (QF) quarterfinalist; (#R) rounds 4, 3, 2, 1; (RR) round-robin stage; (Q#) qualification round; (DNQ) did not qualify; (A) absent; (NH) not held; (SR) strike rate (events won / competed); (W–L) win–loss record.

Tournament	1970	1971	1972	1973	1974	1975	1976	1977		1978	1979	1980	1981	1982	1983	1984	1985	1986	1987	1988	1989	SR	W–L
Grand Slam tournaments
Australian Open (Note: The Australian Open was played twice in 1977, in January and December. Vilas played only in the January event.)	A	A	A	A	A	A	A	F	A	W	W	SF	3R	A	A	A	A	NH	A	A	A	2 / 5	23–3
French Open	A	A	3R (Note: The 1972 French Open had two preliminary rounds. After qualifying, Vilas won in both to enter the main draw. These wins do not count as main draw wins.)	3R	3R	F	QF	W		F	QF	QF	4R	F	QF	1R	2R	QF	2R	2R	1R	1 / 18	56–17
Wimbledon	1R	A	1R	A	3R	QF	QF	3R		3R	2R	A	1R	A	1R	A	A	1R	A	A	A	0 / 11	15–11
US Open	A	A	2R	1R	4R	SF	SF	W		4R	4R	4R	4R	SF	3R	3R	2R	1R	A	A	A	1 / 15	43–14
Win–loss	0–1	0–0	3–3	2–2	7–3	15–3	13–3	21–2		17–3	14–3	10–3	8–4	11–2	6–3	2–2	2–2	4–3	1–1	1–1	0–1	4 / 49	137–45
Year-end ranking	–	–	–	31	5	2	6	2		3	6	5	6	4	11	28	39	22	71	126	408	-	-
Year-end championship
Masters	DNQ	DNQ	DNQ	DNQ	W	SF	SF	SF (Note: The year-ending Masters was played in January of the following year.)		A	RR	RR	RR	SF	DNQ	DNQ	DNQ	DNQ	DNQ	DNQ	DNQ	1 / 8	16–11

== Grand Slam tournaments finals ==
=== Singles: 8 (4 titles, 4 runner-ups) ===
Result	Year	Championship	Surface	Opponent	Score
Loss	1975	French Open	Clay	(Sweden) Björn Borg	2–6, 3–6, 4–6
Loss	1977	Australian Open (Jan.)	Grass	(United States) Roscoe Tanner	3–6, 3–6, 3–6
Win	1977	French Open	Clay	(United States) Brian Gottfried	6–0, 6–3, 6–0
Win	1977	US Open	Clay	(United States) Jimmy Connors	2–6, 6–3, 7–6^{(7–4)}, 6–0
Loss	1978	French Open (2)	Clay	(Sweden) Björn Borg	1–6, 1–6, 3–6
Win	1978	Australian Open	Grass	(Australia) John Marks	6–4, 6–4, 3–6, 6–3
Win	1979	Australian Open (2)	Grass	(United States) John Sadri	7–6^{(7–4)}, 6–3, 6–2
Loss	1982	French Open (3)	Clay	(Sweden) Mats Wilander	6–1, 6–7^{(6–8)}, 0–6, 4–6

== Grand Prix year-end championships finals ==
=== Singles: 1 (1 title) ===
Result	W–L	Year	Tournament	Surface	Opponent	Score
Win	1–0	1974	Grand Prix Masters	Grass	(Romania) Ilie Năstase	7–6^{(8–6)}, 6–2, 3–6, 3–6, 6–4

== WCT year-end championship finals ==
=== Singles: 1 (1 runner-up) ===
Result	W–L	Year	Tournament	Surface	Opponent	Score
Loss	0–1	1976	WCT Finals	Carpet (i)	(Sweden) Björn Borg	6–1, 1–6, 5–7, 1–6

== Career finals ==
=== Singles: 104 (62 titles, 42 runner-ups) ===
Legend Grand Slam tournaments (4) Year-End Championships – Grand Prix (1) Grand Prix / WCT (57)	Titles by surface Clay (49) Grass (3) Hard (4) Carpet (6)	Titles by setting Indoor (9) Outdoor (53)

Result	W-L	Date	Tournament	Surface	Opponent	Score
Loss	0–1	Aug 1972	Cincinnati, US	Clay	(United States) Jimmy Connors	3–6, 3–6
Loss	0–2	Dec 1972	Buenos Aires, Argentina	Clay	(West Germany) Karl Meiler	7–6, 6–2, 4–6, 4–6, 4–6
Win	1–2	Nov 1973	Buenos Aires, Argentina	Clay	(Sweden) Björn Borg	3–6, 6–7^{(5–7)}, 6–4, 6–6, retired
Win	2–2	Jul 1974	Gstaad, Switzerland	Clay	(Spain) Manuel Orantes	6–1, 6–2
Win	3–2	Jul 1974	Hilversum, Netherlands	Clay	(Australia) Barry Phillips-Moore	6–4, 6–2, 1–6, 6–3
Loss	3–3	Jul 1974	Washington, US	Clay	(United States) Harold Solomon	6–1, 3–6, 4–6
Win	4–3	Aug 1974	Louisville, US	Clay	(Chile) Jaime Fillol	6–4, 7–5
Win	5–3	Aug 1974	Toronto, Canada	Clay	(Spain) Manuel Orantes	6–4, 6–2, 6–3
Win	6–3	Oct 1974	Tehran, Iran	Clay	(Mexico) Raúl Ramírez	6–0, 6–3, 6–1
Win	7–3	Nov 1974	Buenos Aires, Argentina (2)	Clay	(Spain) Manuel Orantes	6–3, 0–6, 7–5, 6–2
Win	8–3	Dec 1974	Masters, Melbourne, Australia	Grass	(Romania) Ilie Năstase	7–6^{(8–6)}, 6–2, 3–6, 3–6, 6–4
Win	9–3	May 1975	Munich, West Germany	Clay	(West Germany) Karl Meiler	2–6, 6–0, 6–2, 6–1
Loss	9–4	Jun 1975	French Open, Paris	Clay	(Sweden) Björn Borg	2–6, 3–6, 4–6
Win	10–4	Jul 1975	Hilversum, Netherlands (2)	Clay	(Socialist Federal Republic of Yugoslavia) Željko Franulović	6–4, 6–7^{(3–7)}, 6–2, 6–3
Win	11–4	Jul 1975	Washington, US	Clay	(United States) Harold Solomon	6–1, 6–3
Win	12–4	Aug 1975	Louisville, US (2)	Clay	(Romania) Ilie Năstase	6–4, 6–3
Loss	12–5	Aug 1975	Boston, US	Clay	(Sweden) Björn Borg	3–6, 4–6, 2–6
Loss	12–6	Sep 1975	San Francisco, US	Carpet (i)	(United States) Arthur Ashe	0–6, 6–7^{(4–7)}
Win	13–6	Nov 1975	Buenos Aires, Argentina (3)	Clay	(Italy) Adriano Panatta	6–1, 6–4, 6–4
Win	14–6	Feb 1976	St. Louis WCT, US	Carpet (i)	(India) Vijay Amritraj	4–6, 6–0, 6–4
Win	15–6	Feb 1976	Fort Worth WCT, US	Hard (i)	(Australia) Phil Dent	6–7^{(4–7)}, 6–1, 6–1
Loss	15–7	Apr 1976	São Paulo WCT, Brazil	Carpet (i)	(Sweden) Björn Borg	6–7, 2–6
Win	16–7	Apr 1976	Monte Carlo WCT, Monaco	Clay	(Poland) Wojciech Fibak	6–1, 6–1, 6–4
Loss	16–8	May 1976	WCT Finals, Dallas, US	Carpet (i)	(Sweden) Björn Borg	6–1, 1–6, 5–7, 1–6
Loss	16–9	May 1976	Rome, Italy	Clay	(Italy) Adriano Panatta	6–2, 6–7, 2–6, 6–7
Win	17–9	Aug 1976	Toronto, Canada (2)	Clay	(Poland) Wojciech Fibak	6–4, 7–6^{(7–2)}, 6–2
Win	18–9	Nov 1976	São Paulo, Brazil	Carpet (i)	(Spain) José Higueras	6–3, 6–0, retired
Win	19–9	Nov 1976	Buenos Aires, Argentina (4)	Clay	(Chile) Jaime Fillol	6–2, 6–2, 6–3
Loss	19–10	Jan 1977	Australian Open, Melbourne	Grass	(United States) Roscoe Tanner	3–6, 3–6, 3–6
Loss	19–11	Jan 1977	Baltimore, US	Carpet (i)	(United States) Brian Gottfried	3–6, 6–7
Win	20–11	Feb 1977	Springfield, US	Carpet (i)	(United States) Stan Smith	3–6, 6–0, 6–3, 6–2
Loss	20–12	Feb 1977	Palm Springs, US	Hard	(United States) Brian Gottfried	6–2, 1–6, 3–6
—	20–13	Mar 1977	Johannesburg, South Africa	Hard	(Sweden) Björn Borg	final not played due to rain
Loss	20–14	Apr 1977	Nice, France	Clay	(Sweden) Björn Borg	4–6, 6–1, 2–6, 0–6
Win	21–14	Apr 1977	Buenos Aires, Argentina (5)	Clay	(Poland) Wojciech Fibak	6–4, 6–3, 6–0
Win	22–14	Apr 1977	Virginia Beach, US	Clay	(Romania) Ilie Năstase	6–2, 4–6, 6–2
Win	23–14	Jun 1977	French Open, Paris	Clay	(United States) Brian Gottfried	6–0, 6–3, 6–0
Win	24–14	Jul 1977	Kitzbühel, Austria	Clay	(Czechoslovakia) Jan Kodeš	5–7, 6–2, 4–6, 6–3, 6–2
Win	25–14	Jul 1977	Washington, US (2)	Clay	(United States) Brian Gottfried	6–4, 7–5
Win	26–14	Jul 1977	Louisville, US (3)	Clay	(United States) Eddie Dibbs	1–6, 6–0, 6–1
Win	27–14	Aug 1977	South Orange, US	Clay	(United States) Roscoe Tanner	6–4, 6–1
Win	28–14	Aug 1977	Columbus, US	Clay	(United States) Brian Gottfried	6–2, 6–1
Win	29–14	Sep 1977	US Open, New York	Clay	(United States) Jimmy Connors	2–6, 6–3, 7–6^{(7–4)}, 6–0
Win	30–14	Sep 1977	Paris, France	Clay	(France) Christophe Roger-Vasselin	6–2, 6–1, 7–6^{(7–1)}
Loss	30–15	Oct 1977	Aix-en-Provence, France	Clay	(Romania) Ilie Năstase	1–6, 5–7, retired
Win	31–15	Oct 1977	Tehran, Iran (2)	Clay	(United States) Eddie Dibbs	6–2, 6–4, 1–6, 6–1
Win	32–15	Nov 1977	Bogotá, Colombia	Clay (i)	(Spain) José Higueras	6–1, 6–2, 6–3
Win	33–15	Nov 1977	Santiago, Chile	Clay	(Chile) Jaime Fillol	6–0, 2–6, 6–4
Win	34–15	Nov 1977	Buenos Aires, Argentina (6)	Clay	(Chile) Jaime Fillol	6–2, 7–5, 3–6, 6–3
Win	35–15	Dec 1977	Johannesburg, South Africa	Hard	(United Kingdom) Buster Mottram	7–6^{(7–4)}, 6–3, 6–4
Win	36–15	May 1978	Hamburg, West Germany	Clay	(Poland) Wojciech Fibak	6–2, 6–4, 6–2
Win	37–15	May 1978	Munich, West Germany (2)	Clay	(United Kingdom) Buster Mottram	6–1, 6–3, 6–3
Loss	37–16	Jun 1978	French Open, Paris	Clay	(Sweden) Björn Borg	1–6, 1–6, 3–6
Win	38–16	Jul 1978	Gstaad, Switzerland (2)	Clay	(Argentina) José Luis Clerc	6–3, 7–6^{(10–8)}, 6–4
Win	39–16	Aug 1978	South Orange, US (2)	Clay	(Argentina) José Luis Clerc	6–1, 6–3
Win	40–16	Oct 1978	Aix-en-Provence, France	Clay	(Argentina) José Luis Clerc	6–3, 6–0, 6–3
Win	41–16	Oct 1978	Basel, Switzerland	Hard (i)	(United States) John McEnroe	6–3, 5–7, 7–5, 6–4
Win	42–16	Dec 1978	Australian Open, Melbourne	Grass	(Australia) John Marks	6–4, 6–4, 3–6, 6–3
Win	43–16	Jan 1979	Hobart, Australia	Hard	(Australia) Mark Edmondson	6–4, 6–4
Loss	43–17	Feb 1979	Richmond WCT, US	Carpet (i)	(Sweden) Björn Borg	3–6, 1–6
Loss	43–18	Apr 1979	Stuttgart, West Germany	Hard (i)	(Poland) Wojciech Fibak	2–6, 2–6, 6–3, 2–6
Loss	43–19	May 1979	Rome, Italy	Clay	(United States) Vitas Gerulaitis	7–6, 6–7, 7–6, 4–6, 2–6
Win	44–19	Jul 1979	Washington, US (3)	Clay	(Paraguay) Víctor Pecci	7–6^{(7–4)}, 7–6^{(7–3)}
Loss	44–20	May 1979	Indianapolis, US	Clay	(United States) Jimmy Connors	1–6, 6–2, 4–6
Loss	44–21	Oct 1979	Sydney, Australia	Hard (i)	(United States) Vitas Gerulaitis	6–4, 3–6, 1–6, 6–7
Win	45–21	Nov 1979	Buenos Aires, Argentina (7)	Clay	(Argentina) José Luis Clerc	6–1, 6–2, 6–2
Win	46–21	Dec 1979	Australian Open, Melbourne (2)	Grass	(United States) John Sadri	7–6^{(7–4)}, 6–3, 6–2
Loss	46–22	Apr 1980	Monte Carlo WCT, Monaco	Clay	(Sweden) Björn Borg	1–6, 0–6, 2–6
Loss	46–23	May 1980	Hamburg, West Germany	Clay	(United States) Harold Solomon	7–6, 2–6, 4–6, 6–2, 3–6
Win	47–23	May 1980	Rome, Italy	Clay	(France) Yannick Noah	6–0, 6–4, 6–4
Win	48–23	Jul 1980	Kitzbühel, Austria (2)	Clay	(Czechoslovakia) Ivan Lendl	6–3, 6–2, 6–2
Win	49–23	Sep 1980	Palermo, Italy	Clay	(Australia) Paul McNamee	6–4, 6–0, 6–0
Loss	49–24	Oct 1980	Madrid, Spain	Clay	(Argentina) José Luis Clerc	3–6, 6–1, 6–1, 4–6, 2–6
Loss	49–25	Oct 1980	Barcelona, Spain	Clay	(Czechoslovakia) Ivan Lendl	4–6, 7–5, 4–6, 6–4, 1–6
Win	50–25	Feb 1981	Mar del Plata, Argentina	Clay	(Paraguay) Víctor Pecci	2–6, 6–3, 2–1, retired
Loss	50–26	Feb 1981	Boca Raton, US	Clay	(United States) John McEnroe	7–6^{(7–4)}, 4–6, 0–6
Win	51–26	Mar 1981	Cairo, Egypt	Clay	(West Germany) Peter Elter	6–2, 6–3
Win	52–26	Apr 1981	Houston WCT, US	Clay	(United States) Sammy Giammalva Jr.	6–2, 6–4
—	52–27	Apr 1981	Monte Carlo, Monaco	Clay	(United States) Jimmy Connors	5–5, abandoned due to rain
Loss	52–28	Jul 1981	Kitzbühel, Austria	Clay	(Australia) John Fitzgerald	6–3, 3–6, 5–7
Loss	52–29	Jul 1981	Washington, US	Clay	(Argentina) José Luis Clerc	5–7, 2–6
Loss	52–30	Aug 1981	North Conway, US	Clay	(Argentina) José Luis Clerc	3–6, 2–6
Loss	52–31	Oct 1981	Barcelona, Spain	Clay	(Czechoslovakia) Ivan Lendl	0–6, 3–6, 0–6
Loss	52–32	Nov 1981	Buenos Aires, Argentina	Clay	(Czechoslovakia) Ivan Lendl	1–6, 2–6
Win	53–32	Feb 1982	Buenos Aires, Argentina (8)	Clay	(Argentina) Alejandro Ganzábal	6–2, 6–4
Win	54–32	Mar 1982	Rotterdam, Netherlands	Carpet (i)	(United States) Jimmy Connors	0–6, 6–2, 6–4
Win	55–32	Mar 1982	Milan, Italy	Carpet (i)	(United States) Jimmy Connors	6–3, 6–3
Win	56–32	Apr 1982	Monte Carlo, Monaco (2)	Clay	(Czechoslovakia) Ivan Lendl	6–1, 7–6^{(7–3)}, 6–3
Win	57–32	May 1982	Madrid, Spain	Clay	(Czechoslovakia) Ivan Lendl	6–7^{(5–7)}, 4–6, 6–0, 6–3, 6–3
Loss	57–33	Jun 1982	French Open, Paris	Clay	(Sweden) Mats Wilander	6–1, 6–7^{(6–8)}, 0–6, 4–6
Loss	57–34	Jul 1982	Gstaad, Switzerland	Clay	(Argentina) José Luis Clerc	1–6, 3–6, 2–6
Win	58–34	Jul 1982	Boston, US	Clay	(United States) Mel Purcell	6–4, 6–0
Win	59–34	Jul 1982	Kitzbühel, Austria (3)	Clay	(Brazil) Marcos Hocevar	7–6^{(7–0)}, 6–1
Loss	59–35	Oct 1982	Barcelona, Spain	Clay	(Sweden) Mats Wilander	3–6, 4–6, 3–6
Loss	59–36	Nov 1982	Baltimore WCT, US	Carpet (i)	(Australia) Paul McNamee	6–4, 5–7, 5–7, 6–2, 3–6
Loss	59–37	Nov 1982	Johannesburg, South Africa	Hard	(United States) Vitas Gerulaitis	6–7, 2–6, 6–4, 6–7
Loss	59–38	Jan 1983	Detroit WCT, US	Carpet (i)	(Czechoslovakia) Ivan Lendl	5–7, 2–6, 6–2, 4–6
Win	60–38	Feb 1983	Richmond WCT, US	Carpet (i)	(United States) Steve Denton	6–3, 7–5, 6–4
Win	61–38	Feb 1983	Delray Beach WCT, US	Clay	(Czechoslovakia) Pavel Složil	6–1, 6–4, 6–0
Loss	61–39	Mar 1983	Rotterdam, Netherlands	Hard (i)	(United States) Gene Mayer	1–6, 6–7^{(9–11)}
Loss	61–40	Apr 1983	Hilton Head WCT, US	Clay	(Czechoslovakia) Ivan Lendl	2–6, 1–6, 0–6
Win	62–40	Jul 1983	Kitzbühel, Austria (4)	Clay	(France) Henri Leconte	7–6^{(8–6)}, 4–6, 6–4
Loss	62–41	Oct 1983	Barcelona, Spain	Clay	(Sweden) Mats Wilander	0–6, 3–6, 1–6
Loss	62–42	May 1986	Forest Hills WCT, US	Clay	(France) Yannick Noah	6–7^{(3–7)}, 0–6

=== Doubles: 26 (16 titles, 10 runner-ups) ===
Result	W–L	Date	Tournament	Surface	Partner	Opponents	Score
Win	1–0	Nov 1973	Buenos Aires, Argentina	Clay	(Argentina) Ricardo Cano	(Chile) Patricio Cornejo (Colombia) Iván Molina	7–6, 6–3
Win	2–0	Jul 1974	Hilversum, Netherlands	Clay	(Argentina) Tito Vázquez	(Argentina) Lito Álvarez (Argentina) Julián Ganzábal	6–2, 3–6, 6–1, 6–2
Win	3–0	Aug 1974	Toronto, Canada	Clay	(Spain) Manuel Orantes	(West Germany) Jürgen Fassbender (West Germany) Hans-Jürgen Pohmann	6–1, 2–6, 6–2
Loss	3–1	Oct 1974	Barcelona, Spain	Clay	(Spain) Manuel Orantes	(Spain) Juan Gisbert Sr. (Romania) Ilie Năstase	6–3, 0–6, 2–6
Win	4–1	Oct 1974	Tehran, Iran	Clay	(Spain) Manuel Orantes	(United States) Brian Gottfried (Mexico) Raúl Ramírez	7–6, 2–6, 6–2
Win	5–1	Nov 1974	Buenos Aires, Argentina	Clay	(Spain) Manuel Orantes	(Chile) Patricio Cornejo (Chile) Jaime Fillol	6–4, 6–3
Win	6–1	Jul 1975	Hilversum, Netherlands	Clay	(Poland) Wojciech Fibak	(Socialist Federal Republic of Yugoslavia) Željko Franulović (United Kingdom) John Lloyd	6–4, 6–3
—	7–1	July 1975	Louisville, US	Clay	(Poland) Wojciech Fibak	(India) Vijay Amritraj (India) Anand Amritraj	final not played due to rain, title shared
Win	8–1	Oct 1975	Barcelona, Spain	Clay	(Sweden) Björn Borg	(Poland) Wojciech Fibak (West Germany) Karl Meiler	3–6, 6–4, 6–3
Loss	8–2	Apr 1976	Monte Carlo WCT, Monaco	Clay	(Sweden) Björn Borg	(Poland) Wojciech Fibak (West Germany) Karl Meiler	6–7, 1–6
Win	9–2	Jan 1977	Baltimore, US	Carpet (i)	(Romania) Ion Țiriac	(Australia) Ross Case (Czechoslovakia) Jan Kodeš	6–3, 6–7, 6–4
Loss	9–3	Feb 1977	Springfield, US	Carpet (i)	(Romania) Ion Țiriac	(South Africa) Frew McMillan (South Africa) Bob Hewitt	6–7, 2–6
Win	10–3	Apr 1977	Nice, France	Clay	(Romania) Ion Țiriac	(Australia) Chris Kachel (New Zealand) Chris Lewis	6–4, 6–1
Loss	10–4	Apr 1977	Buenos Aires, Argentina	Clay	(Argentina) Lito Álvarez	(Poland) Wojciech Fibak (Romania) Ion Țiriac	5–7, 6–0, 6–7
Loss	10–5	Aug 1977	South Orange, US	Clay	(Romania) Ion Țiriac	(Australia) Colin Dibley (Poland) Wojciech Fibak	1–6, 5–7
Win	11–5	Oct 1977	Tehran, Iran	Clay	(Romania) Ion Țiriac	(South Africa) Bob Hewitt (South Africa) Frew McMillan	1–6, 6–1, 6–4
Win	12–5	Nov 1977	Buenos Aires, Argentina	Clay	(Romania) Ion Țiriac	(Argentina) Ricardo Cano (Spain) Antonio Muñoz	6–4, 6–0
Win	13–5	May 1978	Munich, West Germany	Clay	(Romania) Ion Țiriac	(Germany) Jürgen Fassbender (Netherlands) Tom Okker	3–6, 6–4, 7–6
Loss	13–6	Aug 1978	South Orange, US	Clay	(Romania) Ion Țiriac	(United States) John McEnroe (United States) Peter Fleming	3–6, 3–6
Win	14–6	Oct 1978	Aix-en-Provence, France	Clay	(Romania) Ion Țiriac	(Czechoslovakia) Jan Kodeš (Czechoslovakia) Tomáš Šmíd	7–6, 6–1
Loss	14–7	Nov 1978	Paris, France	Hard (i)	(Romania) Ion Țiriac	(Zimbabwe) Andrew Pattison (United States) Bruce Manson	6–7, 2–6
Loss	14–8	Jan 1979	Hobart, Australia	Hard	(Romania) Ion Țiriac	(Australia) Bob Giltinan (Australia) Phil Dent	6–8 (pro set)
Loss	14–9	Feb 1979	Richmond WCT, US	Carpet (i)	(Romania) Ion Țiriac	(United States) John McEnroe (United States) Brian Gottfried	4–6, 3–6
Win	15–9	Mar 1979	San José, Costa Rica	Hard	(Romania) Ion Țiriac	(India) Anand Amritraj (Australia) Colin Dibley	6–4, 2–6, 6–4
Loss	15–10	Jul 1979	Gstaad, Switzerland	Clay	(Romania) Ion Țiriac	(Australia) John Marks (Australia) Mark Edmondson	6–2, 1–6, 4–6
Win	16–10	Jul 1979	North Conway, US	Clay	(Romania) Ion Țiriac	(United States) John Sadri (United States) Tim Wilkison	6–4, 7–6

=== ILTF singles titles (12) ===
No.	Date	Tournament	Surface	Opponent	Score
1.	7 March 1971	Santos, Santos City Championships, Brazil	Clay	(Argentina) Ricardo Cano	
2.	16 April 1972	Buenos Aires, River Plate Championships, Argentina	Clay	(Argentina) Héctor Romani	6–2, 6–4, 6–2
3.	10 March 1974	Buenos Aires, River Plate Championships, Argentina	Clay	(Argentina) Julián Ganzábal	7–6, 4–6, 6–3, 6–3
4.	14 September 1974	Buenos Aires, Obras Sanitarias Invitational, Argentina	Carpet (i)	(France) Wanaro N'Godrella	5–7, 4–6, 7–5, retired
5.	20 April 1975	Buenos Aires, River Plate Championships, Argentina	Clay	(United States) Clark Graebner	6–2, 6–1, 6–4
6.	16 January 1977	La Paz, Bolivian Invitational, Bolivia	Carpet (i)	(Italy) Adriano Panatta	6–8, 6–3, 6–1
7.	28 August 1977	Rye Brook, Lionel Tennis Week, US	Clay	(Romania) Ilie Năstase	6–2, 6–0
8.	22 October 1977	Buenos Aires, Luna Park Invitational, Argentina	Carpet (i)	(Romania) Ilie Năstase	2–6, 7–6, 6–3
9.	30 October 1977	Super Tennis 77, Caracas, Venezuela	Hard	(Romania) Ilie Năstase	6–2, 6–2
10.	22 October 1978	Rotterdam, World Star Pro Tennis, Netherlands	Carpet (i)	(United States) Tim Gullikson	7–5, 6–4
11.	26 July 1979	Aix-en-Provence, Provence-Alpes-Côte d'Azur Invitational, France	Hard	(Romania) Ilie Năstase	6–4, 6–4
12.	29 August 1982	Somers, AMF Head Cup, US	Hard	(United States) Eliot Teltscher	7–5, 6–3

=== ILTF singles runner-ups (10) ===
No.	Date	Tournament	Surface	Opponent	Score
1.	6 May 1972	Sutton, London Hard Court Championships, England	Clay	(South Africa) Pat Cramer	6–3, 7–6
2.	30 October 1976	Buenos Aires, Obras Sanitarias Invitational, Argentina	Carpet (i)	(Romania) Ilie Năstase	7–5, 7–6
3.	15 August 1978	Menton, French Riviera Invitational, France	Clay	(Sweden) Bjorn Borg	6–4, 6–3
4.	17 August 1978	Fréjus, Trophée des Arènes, France	Clay	(Sweden) Bjorn Borg	7–6, 7–5
5.	16 September 1979	Rio de Janeiro, Rio Invitational, Brazil	Clay	(United States) Jimmy Connors	6–3, 6–4, 6–3
6.	30 September 1979	Asunción, Boqueron Invitational, Paraguay	Clay	(United States) Jimmy Connors	7–5, 6–3
7.	14 October 1979	Perth, Super Challenge Tennis Tournament, Australia	Carpet (i)	(United States) John McEnroe	6–2, 6–4
8.	25 April 1982	Tokyo, Suntory Cup, Japan	Carpet (i)	(Sweden) Bjorn Borg	6–1, 6–2
9.	19 February 1984	Sydney, Akai Gold Challenge, Australia	Carpet (i)	(United States) John McEnroe	6–3, 6–3, 6–3
10.	6 January 1985	Las Vegas, AT&T Challenge of Champions, US	Carpet (i)	(United States) John McEnroe	7–5, 6–0

== Records ==
- These records were attained in Open Era of tennis.

Event	Years	Record accomplished	Player tied
US Open	1977	72.1% (106–41) games winning % in 1 tournament	Stands alone
Grand Prix Tour	1977	16 titles in 1 season	Stands alone
Grand Prix Tour	1977	22 finals reached in 1 season	Stands alone
Grand Prix Tour	1977	14 clay-court titles in 1 season	Stands alone
Grand Prix Tour	1977	120 outdoor match-wins in 1 season	Stands alone
Grand Prix Tour	1977	15 outdoor titles in 1 season	Stands alone
Grand Prix Tour	1977	145 match-wins in 1 season	Stands alone
Grand Prix Tour	1968–89	632 clay-court match-wins	Stands alone
Argentina Open	1973–82	8 singles titles (Note: The Argentina Open was played twice in 1977.)	Stands alone
Argentina Open	1973–77	6 consecutive titles	Stands alone
