= 1977 ATP Buenos Aires =

1977 ATP Buenos Aires may refer to:

- 1977 ATP Buenos Aires (April)
- 1977 ATP Buenos Aires (November)
