= Aryamehr Cup =

Defunct tennis tournament
- Tour: WCT circuit (1971); Grand Prix circuit (1973-1977)
- Founded: 1971
- Abolished: 1977
- Editions: 6
- Location: Tehran, Iran
- Venue: Imperial Country Club
- Surface: Clay / outdoor

The Aryamehr Cup (Persian: جام آریامهر) is a defunct men's professional tennis tournament that was played on the World Championship Tennis circuit in 1971 and on the Grand Prix tennis circuit from 1973 to 1977. The event was held at the Imperial Country Club in Tehran, Iran and was played on outdoor clay courts.

== Past finals ==
=== Singles ===
Year	Champions	Runners-up	Score
1971	(United States) Marty Riessen	(Australia) John Alexander	6–7, 6–1, 6–3, 7–6
1972	Not held		
1973	(Mexico) Raúl Ramírez	(Australia) John Newcombe	6–7, 6–1, 7–5, 6–3
1974	(Argentina) Guillermo Vilas	(Mexico) Raúl Ramírez	6–0, 6–3, 6–1
1975	(United States) Eddie Dibbs	(Colombia) Iván Molina	1–6, 6–4, 7–5, 6–4
1976	(Spain) Manuel Orantes	(Mexico) Raúl Ramírez	7–6, 6–0, 2–6, 6–4
1977	(Argentina) Guillermo Vilas	(United States) Eddie Dibbs	6–2, 6–4, 1–6, 6–1

=== Doubles ===
Year	Champions	Runners-up	Score
1971	(Australia) John Newcombe (Australia) Tony Roche	(Australia) Bob Carmichael (Australia) Ray Ruffels	6–4, 6–7, 6–1
1972	Not held		
1973	(Australia) Rod Laver (Australia) John Newcombe	(Australia) Ross Case (Australia) Geoff Masters	7–6, 6–2
1974	(Spain) Manuel Orantes (Argentina) Guillermo Vilas	(United States) Brian Gottfried (Mexico) Raúl Ramírez	7–6, 2–6, 6–2
1975	(Spain) Juan Gisbert, Sr. (Spain) Manuel Orantes	(South Africa) Bob Hewitt (South Africa) Frew McMillan	7–5, 6–7, 6–1, 6–4
1976	(Poland) Wojtek Fibak (Mexico) Raúl Ramírez	(Spain) Juan Gisbert, Sr. (Spain) Manuel Orantes	7–5, 6–1
1977	(Romania) Ion Țiriac (Argentina) Guillermo Vilas	(South Africa) Bob Hewitt (South Africa) Frew McMillan	1–6, 6–1, 6–4
