= 1974 Aryamehr Cup =

- Date: 21–27 October
- Edition: 3rd
- Draw: 64S / 32D
- Prize money: $100,000
- Surface: Clay / outdoor
- Location: Tehran, Iran
- Venue: Imperial Country Club

Champions

Singles
- (Argentina) Guillermo Vilas

Doubles
- (Spain) Manuel Orantes / (Argentina) Guillermo Vilas
- Aryamehr Cup

The 1974 Aryamehr Cup was a men's professional tennis tournament played on outdoor clay courts at the Imperial Country Club in Tehran in Iran. The event was part of the 1974 Commercial Union Assurance Grand Prix as a Group AA category event. It was the third edition of the tournament was held from 21 October through 27 October 1974. Guillermo Vilas won the singles title and the trophy was presented by Shah Mohammad Reza Pahlavi.

Due to the lack of a direct flight connection between Tehran and Barcelona, the location of the previous week's Trofeo Conde de Godó tournament, the qualifying tournament with an entry of 42 players was held in Barcelona. The six qualifiers were added to the 38 players with a direct entry to create a field of 44 players. The first four seeded players were Guillermo Vilas, Björn Borg, Manuel Orantes and Harold Solomon.

== Finals ==
=== Singles ===
(Argentina) Guillermo Vilas defeated (Mexico) Raúl Ramírez 6–0, 6–3, 6–1

- It was Vilas' 5th singles title of the year and the 6th of his career.

=== Doubles ===
(Spain) Manuel Orantes / (Argentina) Guillermo Vilas defeated (Mexico) Raúl Ramírez / (United States) Brian Gottfried 7–6, 2–6, 6–2

- It was Orantes' 4th title of the year and the 13th of his career. It was Vilas' 4th title of his career.
