= 1977 Washington Star International =

- Date: July 18–25
- Edition: 9th
- Category: Grand Prix (4 Star)
- Draw: 64S / 32D
- Prize money: $125,000
- Surface: Clay / outdoor
- Location: Washington, D.C., United Statesu

Champions

Singles
- (Argentina) Guillermo Vilas

Doubles
- (Australia) John Alexander / (Australia) Phil Dent
- Washington Open

The 1977 Washington Star International was a men's tennis tournament and was played on outdoor clay courts in Washington, D.C., USA. It was part of the 1977 Grand Prix circuit and categorized as a 4 star event. It was the 9th edition of the tournament and was held in Washington, D.C. from July 18 through July 25, 1977. First-seeded Guillermo Vilas won the singles title, his second after 1975, and earned the $20,000 first-prize money. The singles final was delayed for two hours due to rain.

== Finals ==
=== Singles ===
(Argentina) Guillermo Vilas defeated (United States) Brian Gottfried 6–4, 7–5

- It was Vilas' 6th singles title of the year and the 25th of his career.

=== Doubles ===
(Australia) John Alexander / (Australia) Phil Dent defeated (United States) Fred McNair / (United States) Sherwood Stewart 7–5, 7–5
