= 1977 Aryamehr Cup =

- Date: 3–9 October
- Edition: 6th
- Category: Grand Prix (Five star)
- Draw: 64S / 32D
- Prize money: $150,000
- Surface: Clay / outdoor
- Location: Tehran, Iran

Champions

Singles
- (Argentina) Guillermo Vilas

Doubles
- (Romania) Ion Țiriac / (Argentina) Guillermo Vilas
- Aryamehr Cup

The 1977 Aryamehr Cup (Persian: جام آریامهر ۱۳۵۵) was a men's professional tennis tournament played on outdoor clay courts in Tehran in Iran. The event was part of the 1977 Colgate-Palmolive Grand Prix as a Five Star category event. It was the sixth and final edition of the tournament and was held from 3 October through 9 October 1977. Guillermo Vilas won the singles title.

== Finals ==
=== Singles ===
(Argentina) Guillermo Vilas defeated (United States) Eddie Dibbs 6–2, 6–4, 1–6, 6–1

- It was Vilas' 12th singles title of the year and the 31st of his career.

=== Doubles ===
(Romania) Ion Țiriac / (Argentina) Guillermo Vilas defeated (South Africa) Bob Hewitt / (South Africa) Frew McMillan 1–6, 6–1, 6–4

- It was Tiriac's 4th title of the year and the 16th of his career. It was Vilas' 3rd title of the year and the 11th of his career.
