= 1973 Aryamehr Cup =

- Date: 22–28 October
- Edition: 2nd
- Draw: 64S / 32D
- Surface: Clay / outdoor
- Location: Tehran, Iran
- Venue: Imperial Country Club

Champions

Singles
- (Mexico) Raúl Ramírez

Doubles
- (Australia) Rod Laver / (Australia) John Newcombe
- Aryamehr Cup

The 1973 Aryamehr Cup was a men's professional tennis tournament played on outdoor clay courts at the Imperial Country Club in Tehran in Iran. The event was part of the 1973 Commercial Union Assurance Grand Prix as a Group A category event. It was the second edition of the tournament was held from 22 October through 28 October 1973. Raúl Ramírez won the singles title and the trophy and first–prize cheque for $9,000 was presented by Shah Mohammad Reza Pahlavi.

== Finals ==
=== Singles ===
(Mexico) Raúl Ramírez defeated (Australia) John Newcombe 6–7, 6–1, 7–5, 6–3

- It was Ramírez' 2nd title of the year and his 2nd career title.

=== Doubles ===
(Australia) Rod Laver / (Australia) John Newcombe defeated (Australia) Ross Case / (Australia) Geoff Masters 7–6, 6–2
