= 1978 World Championship Tennis Finals – Singles =

Singles
- 1978 World Championship Tennis Finals

Final
- Champion: (United States) Vitas Gerulaitis
- Runner-up: (United States) Eddie Dibbs
- Score: 6–3, 6–2, 6–1

Events
Singles
- World Championship Tennis Finals

Jimmy Connors was the defending champion but did not compete that year.

Vitas Gerulaitis won in the final 6–3, 6–2, 6–1 against Eddie Dibbs.

== Seeds ==
A champion seed is indicated in bold text while text in italics indicates the round in which that seed was eliminated.

1. (Sweden) Björn Borg (semifinals, withdrew)
2. (United States) Brian Gottfried (quarterfinals)
3. (United States) **Vitas Gerulaitis (champion)**
4. (Romania) Ilie Năstase (quarterfinals)
5. (United States) Eddie Dibbs (final)
6. (Mexico) Raúl Ramirez (quarterfinals)
7. (Italy) Corrado Barazzutti (semifinals)
8. (United States) Dick Stockton (quarterfinals)

== Draw ==
Key

- Q = Qualifier
- WC = Wild card
- LL = Lucky loser
- Alt = Alternate
- ITF = ITF entry
- PR = Protected ranking
- SR = Special ranking
- SE = Special exempt
- JE = Junior exempt
- JR = Junior Accelerator Programme entrant
- CO = College Accelerator Programme entrant
- NG = Next Gen Accelerator Program entrant
- w/o = Walkover
- r = Retired
- d = Defaulted

Quarterfinals
1	(Sweden) **Björn Borg**	4	**6**	**6**	**6**
8	(United States) Dick Stockton	**6**	2	1	0
3	(United States) **Vitas Gerulaitis**	**6**	2	**6**	**6**
6	(Mexico) Raúl Ramirez	2	**6**	2	1
5	(United States) **Eddie Dibbs**	**6**	**6**	**6**
4	(Romania) Ilie Năstase	3	3	0
7	(Italy) **Corrado Barazzutti**	**6**	2	1	**6**	**6**
2	(United States) Brian Gottfried	4	**6**	**6**	1	3

Semifinals
1	(Sweden) Björn Borg
3	(United States) **Vitas Gerulaitis**	w/o
5	(United States) **Eddie Dibbs**	**6**	**7**	**6**
7	(Italy) Corrado Barazzutti	2	6	4

Final
3	(United States) **Vitas Gerulaitis**	**6**	**6**	**6**
5	(United States) Eddie Dibbs	3	2	1
