= 1977 Orient Cup =

- Date: 7–13 November
- Edition: 1st
- Category: Grand Prix (One star)
- Draw: 32S / 16D
- Prize money: $50,000
- Surface: Clay / outdoor
- Location: Bogotá, Colombia

Champions

Singles
- (Argentina) Guillermo Vilas

Doubles
- (Chile) Belus Prajoux / (Chile) Hans Gildemeister
- International Tennis Championships of Colombia

The 1977 Orient Cup was a men's tennis tournament played on outdoor clay courts in Bogotá, Colombia that was part of the one star category of the 1977 Colgate-Palmolive Grand Prix. It was the inaugural edition of the tournament and was held from 7 November through 13 November 1977. First-seeded Guillermo Vilas won the singles title.

== Finals ==
=== Singles ===
(Argentina) Guillermo Vilas defeated (Spain) José Higueras 6–1, 6–2, 6–3

- It was Vilas' 13th singles title of the year and the 32nd of his career.

=== Doubles ===
(Chile) Belus Prajoux / (Chile) Hans Gildemeister defeated (Venezuela) Jorge Andrew / (Brazil) Carlos Kirmayr 6–4, 6–2
