= 1976 Aryamehr Cup =

- Date: 4–10 October
- Edition: 5th
- Category: Grand Prix (Five star)
- Draw: 64S / 32D
- Prize money: $150,000
- Surface: Clay / outdoor
- Location: Tehran, Iran

Champions

Singles
- (Spain) Manuel Orantes

Doubles
- (Poland) Wojciech Fibak / (Mexico) Raúl Ramírez
- Aryamehr Cup

The 1976 Aryamehr Cup was a men's professional tennis tournament played on outdoor clay courts in Tehran in Iran. The event was part of the 1976 Commercial Union Assurance Grand Prix as a Five Star category event. It was the fifth edition of the tournament and was held from 4 October through 10 October 1976. Manuel Orantes won the singles title.

== Finals ==
=== Singles ===
(Spain) Manuel Orantes defeated (Mexico) Raúl Ramírez 7–6, 6–0, 2–6, 6–4

- It was Orantes' 4th title of the year and the 23rd of his career.

=== Doubles ===
(Poland) Wojciech Fibak / (Mexico) Raúl Ramírez defeated (Spain) Juan Gisbert, Sr. / (Spain) Manuel Orantes 7–5, 6–1

- It was Fibak's 6th title of the year and the 11th of his career. It was Ramirez' 13h title of the year and the 34th of his career.
