= Monterrey WCT =

Defunct tennis tournament
- Event name: Monterrey WCT
- Tour: WCT Tour
- Founded: 1976
- Abolished: 1983
- Editions: 5
- Location: Monterrey, Mexico
- Venue: Monterrey Tech Gymnasium (1976-77); New Leon Gymnasium (1981-83)
- Surface: Carpet

The Monterrey WCT was a men's tennis tournament played in Monterrey, Mexico from 1976 to 1977 and 1981 to 1983. The event was part of the WCT Tour and was played on indoor carpet courts.

== Finals ==
=== Singles ===
Year	Champions	Runners-up	Score
1976	(United States) Eddie Dibbs	(United States) Harold Solomon	7–6, 6–2
1977	(Poland) Wojciech Fibak	(United States) Vitas Gerulaitis	6–4, 6–3
1981	(South Africa) Johan Kriek	(United States) Vitas Gerulaitis	7–6, 3–6, 7–6
1982	(United States) Jimmy Connors	(South Africa) Johan Kriek	6–2, 3–6, 6–3
1983	(United States) Sammy Giammalva	(United States) Ben Testerman	6–4, 3–6, 6–3

=== Doubles ===
Year	Champions	Runners-up	Score
1976	(United States) Brian Gottfried (Mexico) Raúl Ramírez	(Australia) Ross Case (Australia) Geoff Masters	6–2, 4–6, 6–3
1977	(Australia) Ross Case (Poland) Wojciech Fibak	(United States) Billy Martin (United States) Bill Scanlon	3–6, 6–3, 6–4
1981	(South Africa) Kevin Curren (United States) Steve Denton	(South Africa) Johan Kriek (New Zealand) Russell Simpson	7–6, 6–3
1982	(United States) Hank Pfister (United States) Victor Amaya	(United States) Tracy Delatte (United States) Mel Purcell	6–3, 6–7, 6–3
1983	(Nigeria) Nduka Odizor (United States) David Dowlen	(United States) Andy Andrews (United States) John Sadri	3–6, 6–3, 6–4

== See also ==
- Mexico City WCT
