= 1977 Wendy's Tennis Classic =

- Date: August 8–15
- Edition: 8th
- Category: Grand Prix (Four Star)
- Draw: 64S / 32D
- Prize money: $125,000
- Surface: Clay / outdoor
- Location: Columbus, Ohio, United States
- Venue: Muirfield Village

Champions

Singles
- (Argentina) Guillermo Vilas

Doubles
- (United States) Bob Lutz / (United States) Stan Smith
- Columbus Open

The 1977 Wendy's Tennis Classic, also known as the Buckeye Championships, was a men's tennis tournament played on outdoor clay courts at the Muirfield Village in Dublin, a suburb of Columbus, Ohio in the United States that was part of the Four Star category of the 1977 Grand Prix circuit. It was the eighth edition of the tournament and was held from August 8 through August 15, 1977. First-seeded Guillermo Vilas won the singles title and earned $20,000 first-prize money.

== Finals ==
=== Singles ===
(Argentina) Guillermo Vilas defeated (United States) Brian Gottfried 6–2, 6–1

- It was Vilas' 9th singles title of the year and 28th of his career.

=== Doubles ===
(United States) Bob Lutz / (United States) Stan Smith defeated (United States) Peter Fleming / (United States) Gene Mayer 4–6, 7–5, 6–2
