= Mar del Plata Open (tennis) =

Defunct tennis tournament
- Event name: Mar del Plata Open
- Tour: Exhibition (1979–1980); Grand Prix circuit (1981)
- Founded: 1979
- Abolished: 1981
- Editions: 3
- Location: Mar del Plata, Buenos Aires Province, Argentina
- Surface: Clay / outdoor

The Mar del Plata Open is a defunct Grand Prix affiliated men's tennis tournament founded in 1979 as the Mar del Plata Invitation. It was held at the Patinódromo Municipal, Mar del Plata in Argentina and played on outdoor clay courts.

== Finals ==
=== Singles ===
Year	Champions	Runners-up	Score
1979	(Argentina) Guillermo Vilas	(Romania) Ilie Năstase	6–4, 7–5, 6–3
1980	(Sweden) Björn Borg	(Argentina) Guillermo Vilas	6–1, 6–3, 6–3
1981	(Argentina) Guillermo Vilas (2)	(Paraguay) Víctor Pecci	2–6, 6–3, 2–1 RET.

=== Doubles ===
Year	Champions	Runners-up	Score
1981	(Australia) David Carter (Australia) Paul Kronk	(Spain) Ángel Giménez (Colombia) Jairo Velasco Sr.	6–7, 6–4, 6–0

== See also ==
- Mar del Plata Championships – tournament (1930–1966)
