= Mar del Plata Championships =

Defunct tennis tournament
- Event name: Mar del Plata Championships
- Founded: 1930
- Abolished: 1966
- Location: Temperley, Buenos Aires, Argentina
- Venue: Temperley Lawn Tennis Club
- Surface: Clay / outdoor

The Mar del Plata Championships was a combined clay court tennis tournament founded in 1936. It was played at the Temperley Lawn Tennis Club (founded 1920), Temperley, Buenos Aires, Argentina until 1946 as part of the ILTF South America Circuit when it was discontinued.

It was the percussor tournament to the later Mar del Plata Invitation later called the Mar del Plata Open.

== Past finals ==
=== Men's Singles ===
(incomplete roll)

Year	Champions	Runners-up	Score
1930	(United Kingdom) Fred Perry	(Argentina) Guillermo Robson	6–2, 7–5, 6–2
1936	(Argentina) Américo Cattaruzza	(Argentina) Adelmar Echeverria	6–0, 6–1, 6–0
1939	(Ecuador) Pancho Segura	(Argentina) Roberto Clutterbuck	6–1, 6–1, 6–0
1946	(Argentina) Carlos Morea	(Brazil) Armando Vieira	6–3, 6–3, 6–2
1966	(Italy) Nicola Pietrangeli	(Australia) Martin Mulligan	6–1, 4–6, 6–4, 6–2
