= WCT Invitational =

Defunct tennis tournament
- Tour: WCT Tour
- Founded: 1978
- Abolished: 1981
- Editions: 4
- Location: Forest Hills, New York, US (1978–1979); Salisbury, Maryland, US (1980–1981)
- Surface: Clay, (1978–79); Carpet (1980–81)

The WCT Invitational was a professional men's tennis tournament held from 1978 through 1981 in the United States. The tournament was held in Forest Hills, New York on clay courts from 1978–79 and in Salisbury, Maryland on indoor carpet courts from 1980–81. The singles event was played as a round-robin format and a doubles event was played when the tournament was held in Forest Hills, also in a round-robin format.

== Finals ==
=== Singles ===
Location	Year	Champions	Runners-up	Score
Forest Hills	1978	(United States) Vitas Gerulaitis	(Romania) Ilie Năstase	6–2, 6–0
Forest Hills	1979	(United States) Eddie Dibbs	(United States) Harold Solomon	7–6, 6–1
Salisbury	1980	(Sweden) Björn Borg	(India) Vijay Amritraj	7–5, 6–1, 6–3
Salisbury	1981	(United States) Bill Scanlon	(India) Vijay Amritraj	3–6, 6–2, 6–4, 3–6, 6–4

=== Doubles ===
Location	Year	Champions	Runners-up	Score
Forest Hills	1978	(Australia) John Alexander (Australia) Phil Dent	(United States) Fred McNair (United States) Sherwood Stewart	7–6, 7–6
Forest Hills	1979	(United States) Peter Fleming (United States) John McEnroe	(United States) Gene Mayer (United States) Sandy Mayer	6–7, 7–6, 6–3
