= 1981 Mar del Plata Open =

Men's tennis tournament

- Date: 2–8 February
- Edition: 1st
- Category: Grand Prix
- Draw: 32S / 16D
- Prize money: $75,000
- Surface: Clay / outdoor
- Location: Mar del Plata, Argentina

Champions

Singles
- (Argentina) Guillermo Vilas

Doubles
- (Australia) Paul Kronk / (Australia) David Carter
- Mar del Plata Open

The 1981 Mar del Plata Open was a men's tennis tournament played on outdoor clay courts in Mar del Plata, Argentina that was part of the 1981 Volvo Grand Prix. It was the first edition of the tournament and was held from 2 February until 8 February 1981. First-seeded Guillermo Vilas won the singles title after his opponent in the final Víctor Pecci retired with a pulled muscle in his right shoulder.

== Finals ==
=== Singles ===
(Argentina) Guillermo Vilas defeated (Paraguay) Víctor Pecci 2–6, 6–3, 2–1, ret.

- It was Vilas's 1st singles title of the year and the 50th of his career.

=== Doubles ===
(Australia) Paul Kronk / (Australia) David Carter defeated (Spain) Ángel Giménez / (Colombia) Jairo Velasco, Sr. 6–7, 6–4, 6–0

- It was Kronk's 3rd doubles title of the year and the 5th of his career. It was Carter's 3rd doubles title of the year and of his career.
