= 1978 Suisse Open Gstaad =

- Date: 10–16 July
- Edition: 33rd
- Category: Grand Prix
- Draw: 64S / 32D
- Prize money: $75,000
- Surface: Clay / outdoor
- Location: Gstaad, Switzerland

Champions

Singles
- (Argentina) Guillermo Vilas

Doubles
- (Australia) Mark Edmondson / (Netherlands) Tom Okker
- Suisse Open Gstaad

The 1978 Suisse Open Gstaad was a men's tennis tournament played on outdoor clay courts in Gstaad, Switzerland. It was the 33rd edition of the tournament and was held from 10 July through 16 July 1978. The tournament was part of the Grand Prix tennis circuit with a total prize money available of $75,000. First-seeded Guillermo Vilas won the singles title, his second at the tournament after 1974.

== Finals ==
=== Singles ===
(Argentina) Guillermo Vilas defeated (Argentina) José Luis Clerc 6–3, 7–6, 6–4

- It was Vilas' 3rd singles title of the year and the 38th of his career.

=== Doubles ===
(Australia) Mark Edmondson / (Netherlands) Tom Okker defeated (South Africa) Bob Hewitt / (Australia) Kim Warwick 6–4, 1–6, 6–1, 6–4
