= 1982 Madrid Grand Prix =

- Date: 26 April – 2 May
- Edition: 11th
- Category: Grand Prix
- Draw: 32S / 16D
- Prize money: $200,000
- Surface: Clay / outdoor
- Location: Madrid, Spain
- Venue: Real Sociedad Hípica Española Club de Campo

Champions

Singles
- (Argentina) Guillermo Vilas

Doubles
- (Czechoslovakia) Tomáš Šmíd / (Czechoslovakia) Pavel Složil
- Madrid Tennis Grand Prix

The 1982 Madrid Grand Prix Trofeo was a men's tennis tournament played on outdoor clay courts that was part of the 1982 Volvo Grand Prix tennis circuit. It was the 11th edition of the tournament and was held at the Real Sociedad Hípica Española Club de Campo in Madrid, Spain from 26 April until 2 May 1982. Second-seeded Guillermo Vilas won the singles title.

== Finals ==
=== Singles ===
(Argentina) Guillermo Vilas defeated (Czechoslovakia) Ivan Lendl 6–7, 4–6, 6–0, 6–3, 6–3

- It was Vilas' 5th singles title of the year and the 57th of his career.

=== Doubles ===
(Czechoslovakia) Tomáš Šmíd / (Czechoslovakia) Pavel Složil defeated (Switzerland) Heinz Günthardt / (Hungary) Balázs Taróczy 6–1, 3–6, 9–7

- It was Šmíd's 3rd doubles title of the year and the 9th of his career. It was Složil's 3rd doubles title of the year and the 5th of his career.
