= 1977 Mutual Benefit Life Open =

- Date: July 31 – August 8
- Edition: 8th
- Category: Grand Prix (Two Star)
- Draw: 32S/16D
- Prize money: $75,000
- Surface: Clay / Outdoor
- Location: South Orange, New Jersey, US
- Venue: Orange Lawn Tennis Club

Champions

Singles
- (Argentina) Guillermo Vilas

Doubles
- (Australia) Colin Dibley / (Poland) Wojciech Fibak
- South Orange Open

The 1977 Mutual Benefit Life Open, also known as the South Orange Open, was a men's tennis tournament played on outdoor clay courts at the Orange Lawn Tennis Club in South Orange, New Jersey in the United States. It was classified as a Two Star category tournament and was part of the 1977 Grand Prix circuit. This was the eighth edition of the tournament on the Grand Prix circuit and was held from July 31 through August 8, 1977. First-seeded Guillermo Vilas won the singles title.

== Finals ==
=== Singles ===
(Argentina) Guillermo Vilas defeated (United States) Roscoe Tanner 6–4, 6–1

- It was Vilas' 8th singles title of the year and the 27th of his career.

=== Doubles ===
(Australia) Colin Dibley / (Poland) Wojciech Fibak defeated (Romania) Ion Țiriac / (Argentina) Guillermo Vilas 6–1, 7–5
