= 1975 Aryamehr Cup =

Tennis tournament

- Date: 20–26 October
- Edition: 4th
- Draw: 64S / 32D
- Surface: Clay / outdoor
- Location: Tehran, Iran

Champions

Singles
- (United States) Eddie Dibbs

Doubles
- (Spain) Juan Gisbert, Sr. / (Spain) Manuel Orantes
- Aryamehr Cup

The 1975 Aryamehr Cup (Persian: جام آریامهر ۱۳۵۳) was a men's professional tennis tournament played on outdoor clay courts at the Imperial Country Club in Tehran in Iran. It was part of the 1975 Commercial Union Assurance Grand Prix as a Group AA category event. The tournament was held from 20 October through 26 October 1975. Eddie Dibbs won the singles title.

== Finals ==
=== Singles ===
(United States) Eddie Dibbs defeated (Colombia) Iván Molina 1–6, 6–4, 7–5, 6–4

- It was Dibbs' 1st title of the year and the 5th of his career.

=== Doubles ===
(Spain) Juan Gisbert, Sr. / (Spain) Manuel Orantes defeated (Australia) Bob Hewitt / (Australia) Frew McMillan 7–5, 6–7, 6–1, 6–4

- It was Gisbert's 6th title of the year and the 18th of his career. It was Orantes' 4th title of the year and the 18th of his career.
