= 1978 Mutual Benefit Life Open =

- Date: July 31 – August 6
- Edition: 9th
- Category: Grand Prix
- Draw: 32S/16D
- Prize money: $75,000
- Surface: Clay / outdoor
- Location: South Orange, New Jersey, US
- Venue: Orange Lawn Tennis Club

Champions

Singles
- (Argentina) Guillermo Vilas

Doubles
- (United States) John McEnroe / (United States) Peter Fleming
- South Orange Open

The 1978 Mutual Benefit Life Open, also known as the South Orange Open, was a men's tennis tournament played on outdoor clay courts at the Orange Lawn Tennis Club in South Orange, New Jersey in the United States. The event was part of the 1978 Grand Prix circuit. It was the ninth edition of the tournament and was held from July 31 through August 6, 1978. First-seeded Guillermo Vilas won his second consecutive singles title at the event and earned $15,000 first-prize money.

== Finals ==
=== Singles ===
(Argentina) Guillermo Vilas defeated (Argentina) José Luis Clerc 6–1, 6–3

- It was Vilas' 4th singles title of the year and the 39th of his career.

=== Doubles ===
(United States) John McEnroe / (United States) Peter Fleming defeated (Romania) Ion Țiriac / (Argentina) Guillermo Vilas 6–3, 6–3
