= 1973 South American Open =

- Date: 19 – 25 November
- Edition: 6th
- Category: Grand Prix (Group B)
- Draw: 32S / 4D
- Prize money: $35,000
- Surface: Clay / outdoor
- Location: Buenos Aires, Argentina

Champions

Singles
- (Argentina) Guillermo Vilas

Doubles
- (Argentina) Guillermo Vilas / (Argentina) Ricardo Cano
← 1972 ·	South American Open	· 1974 →

The 1973 South American Open, also known as the Argentine Open, was a men's tennis tournament that was played on outdoor clay courts in Buenos Aires, Argentina. The event was part of the 1973 Commercial Union Assurance Grand Prix circuit, categorized as Group B, and was held from 19 November through 25 November 1973. Guillermo Vilas won the singles title after first-seeded Björn Borg had to retire in the final after injuring his hand when he ran into the umpire's stand. He earned $7,000 first-prize money.

== Finals ==
=== Singles ===
(Argentina) Guillermo Vilas defeated (Sweden) Björn Borg 3–6, 6–7, 6–4, 6–6^{(5–5)} (Borg retired)

- It was Vilas's only singles title of the year and the first of his career.

=== Doubles ===
(Argentina) Guillermo Vilas / (Argentina) Ricardo Cano defeated (Chile) Patricio Cornejo / (Colombia) Ivan Molina 7–6, 6–3
