= 1974 South American Championships (tennis) =

- Date: 18– 24 November
- Edition: 7th
- Category: Grand Prix (Group A)
- Draw: 32S / 32D
- Prize money: $50,000
- Surface: Clay, outdoor
- Venue: Buenos Aires, Argentina

Champions

Singles
- (Argentina) Guillermo Vilas

Doubles
- (Spain) Manuel Orantes / (Argentina) Guillermo Vilas
← 1973 ·	South American Championships	· 1975 →

The 1974 South American Championships was a men's tennis tournament for male players that was part of the 1974 Commercial Union Assurance Grand Prix. It was played in Buenos Aires, Argentina, and held from 18 November through 24 November 1974. First-seeded Guillermo Vilas won the singles title.

== Finals ==
=== Singles ===
(Argentina) Guillermo Vilas defeated (Spain) Manuel Orantes 6–3, 0–6, 7–5, 6–2

- It was Vilas's 6th singles title of the year and the 7th of his career.

=== Doubles ===
(Spain) Manuel Orantes / (Argentina) Guillermo Vilas defeated (Chile) Patricio Cornejo / (Chile) Jaime Fillol 6–4, 6–3

- It was Orantes's 5th title of the year and the 25th of his career. It was Vilas's 10th title of the year and the 11th of his career.
