= Super Tennis 77 =

Defunct tennis tournament
- Event name: Galaxy Cup (1974); Caracas International Round Robin (1976); Super Tennis 77 (1977)
- Tour: ILTF Independent Circuit
- Founded: 1974
- Abolished: 1977
- Editions: 3
- Location: Caracas; Venezuela
- Venue: Altamira Tennis Club
- Surface: Clay (1974, 1976); Hard (1977)
- Draw: 12 (S)
- Prize money: $100,000 (1976)

The Super Tennis 77 was a men's round robin tennis tournament founded in 1974 as the Galaxy Cup and was part of the ILTF Independent Circuit. The tournament was usually played annually in Caracas, Venezuela and ran until 1977.

== History ==
In December 1974 the first edition Galaxy Cup was played at the Altamira Tennis Club on clay courts. In 1975 the event was not held.

It resumed in 1976 as the Caracas International Round Robin offering $100,000 prize money, and was scheduled in October. In 1977 the events name was rebranded as the Super Tennis 77 tournament, it operated a round robin knock out format with a 3rd and 4th place play off and a 1st and 2nd place playoff.

== Past finals ==
=== Singles ===
Year	Winner	Runner-up	Score
1974	(United States) Arthur Ashe	(United States) Tom Gorman	3–6, 6–3, 7–6
1976	(Romania) Ilie Nastase	(United States) Jimmy Connors	6–1, 6–3
1977	(Argentina) Guillermo Vilas	(Romania) Ilie Nastase	6–2, 6–2
