= Vitas Gerulaitis =

American tennis player (1954–1994)

- Gerulaitis in 1978
- Full name: Vytautas Kevin Gerulaitis
- Country (sports): United States
- Born: July 26, 1954 Brooklyn, New York, US
- Died: September 17, 1994 (aged 40) Southampton, New York, US
- Height: 6 ft 0 in (1.83 m)
- Turned pro: 1971
- Retired: 1986
- Plays: Right-handed (one-handed backhand)
- Prize money: US$2,778,748

Singles
- Career record: 535–232 (69.8%)
- Career titles: 26
- Highest ranking: No. 3 (February 27, 1978)

Grand Slam singles results
- Australian Open: W (1977^{Dec})
- French Open: F (1980)
- Wimbledon: SF (1977, 1978)
- US Open: F (1979)

Other tournaments
- Tour Finals: F (1979, 1981)
- WCT Finals: W (1978)

Doubles
- Career record: 164–123 (57.1%)
- Career titles: 9
- Highest ranking: No. 43 (May 20, 1985)

Grand Slam doubles results
- Australian Open: 1R (1983)
- French Open: QF (1980)
- Wimbledon: W (1975)
- US Open: 3R (1972)

Vytautas "Vitas" Kevin Gerulaitis (July 26, 1954 – September 17, 1994) was an American professional tennis player. He was ranked world No. 3 in men's singles by the Association of Tennis Professionals (ATP) in 1978. Gerulaitis won the men's singles title at the December 1977 Australian Open, and the men's doubles title at the 1975 Wimbledon Championships, partnering with Sandy Mayer. Gerulaitis also won two Italian Opens in 1977 and 1979, and the 1978 WCT Finals.

== Early life ==
Gerulaitis was named for 15th century Lithuanian King Vytautas the Great, a name Gerulaitis shared with his father. Born to Lithuanian immigrant parents in Brooklyn, New York, Gerulaitis grew up in Howard Beach, Queens, attended Archbishop Molloy High School in Queens, and graduated in 1971. He attended Columbia College of Columbia University for one year, before dropping out to pursue his tennis career full-time.

Gerulaitis was nicknamed "The Lithuanian Lion". His younger sister Ruta was also a professional tennis player; both siblings' native language was Lithuanian.

== Career highlights ==
Gerulaitis led the Pittsburgh Triangles to the World TeamTennis championship title at Pittsburgh's Civic Arena in 1975. Gerulaitis played for the Triangles from 1974 until 1976. He also played for the league's Indiana Loves franchise in 1977.

Gerulaitis was coached by Fred Stolle from 1977 until 1983.

He also won the men's doubles title at Wimbledon in 1975. He was a singles semifinalist at Wimbledon in both 1977 and 1978. In 1977 he lost a Wimbledon semifinal to his close friend and practice partner, Björn Borg, 6–4, 3–6, 6–3, 3–6, 8–6, a match considered one of the greatest ever, with journalist Curry Kirkpatrick stating shortly thereafter that it may have "been the finest ever played at Wimbledon".

In December 1977, Gerulaitis won the most significant title of his career at the Australian Open, when he defeated John Lloyd in the men's singles final in five sets on New Year's Eve, despite suffering from leg cramps in the last two sets.

In 1978, Gerulaitis won the year-end championship WCT Finals for the World Championship Tennis tour, beating Eddie Dibbs in straight sets. By 1978, he was the third-ranked men's singles player in the world.

Gerulaitis advanced to the men's singles finals at the US Open in 1979, but lost in straight sets to fellow New Yorker John McEnroe. He was a member of the U.S. team which won the Davis Cup in 1979 and won two singles "rubbers" in the final, as the U.S. swept Italy 5–0.

Gerulaitis reached his third Grand Slam singles final at the French Open in 1980, but lost in straight sets to defending champion Borg.

In February 1981, Gerulaitis won the star-laden Toronto Indoor invitational tournament, defeating Jimmy Connors in the semifinal and McEnroe in four sets in the final. He lost in the 1981 Masters final against Ivan Lendl after leading 2 sets to 0 and match point.

During his career, Gerulaitis won 25 top-level singles titles and eight doubles titles. His career-high singles ranking was world No. 3, which he reached on February 27, 1978.

Gerulaitis was known for his exceptionally quick hands at the net and his outstanding court coverage. In 1985, Gerulaitis teamed with Bobby Riggs to launch a challenge to female players after the famous Battle of the Sexes. The stunt, however, was short-lived when Gerulaitis and Riggs lost a doubles match against Martina Navratilova and Pam Shriver.

He retired from the professional tour in 1986 and was a regular tennis commentator on the USA network between 1988 and 1993, and then on CBS and ESPN in 1994.

Gerulaitis coached Pete Sampras during the 1994 Italian Open in Rome, when Sampras's coach, Tim Gullikson, was on a family vacation. Sampras won the title by defeating Boris Becker in the final in straight sets.

== Personal life ==
Gerulaitis was known for his larger-than-life persona, long blonde hair, and hard partying almost as much as he was for his tennis. At the same time, he took the sport very seriously, not letting his extravagances get in the way of doing his utmost to excel as a player.

Gerulaitis was extremely popular among his fellow tennis stars, as he was with the public.

Once he became successful, he was often seen on the town with well known celebrities and models. He also dated fellow tennis player Chris Evert, and was engaged to model Janet Gretzky for two years when she was still actress Janet Jones. (Less than a year after the engagement ended, she married Wayne Gretzky.) Gerulaitis never married.

Gerulaitis spread his money around. Once he achieved success, he purchased a mansion for his parents, and also bought himself a Lamborghini, two Rolls Royces, a Mercedes, and a Porsche. Yet he was also known for being quite charitable with both his time and his money.

After his tennis career ended, Gerulaitis opened a night club in Dallas, explaining that he knew the night life well from his own personal experience.

Gerulaitis admitted using cocaine, and formed a dependency after his tennis career ended, but had beaten back the addiction before his death.

== Death ==
On September 17, 1994, while Gerulaitis was visiting a friend's home in Southampton, New York, an improperly installed propane heater for the swimming pool caused carbon monoxide gas to seep into the guesthouse where he was sleeping, causing his death by carbon monoxide poisoning. He failed to show up for a dinner at 7 p.m. that Saturday evening, and his body was found the following day by a maid who went to the guesthouse. Gerulaitis's remains were interred in Saint Charles Cemetery in Farmingdale, New York.

Criminal charges of negligent homicide were later brought against the pool mechanic and the company he worked for. Both he and the company were acquitted in October 1996. Jurors heard testimony that a technician from the heater manufacturer had made adjustments several days before Gerulaitis's death and that even if an exhaust pipe had been longer, carbon monoxide (colorless and odorless) would have still been drawn into the air-conditioning vent because it is denser than air at low temperatures. Arthur M. Luxenberg, a lawyer for the Gerulaitis family, stated that Gerulaitis's mother and sister believed the verdict to be fair, and he went on to state that the testimony at the trial "confirmed to us what we always knew: that there were a lot of other people involved in this matter."

The Gerulaitis family reached a confidential settlement with some of the defendants in their civil case by 2002.

== Grand Slam finals ==
=== Singles: 3 (1 title, 2 runner-ups) ===
Result	Year	Championship	Surface	Opponent	Score
Win	1977	Australian Open (Dec.)	Grass	(United Kingdom) John Lloyd	6–3, 7–6^{(7–4)}, 5–7, 3–6, 6–2
Loss	1979	US Open	Hard	(United States) John McEnroe	5–7, 3–6, 3–6
Loss	1980	French Open	Clay	(Sweden) Björn Borg	4–6, 1–6, 2–6

=== Doubles: (1 title) ===
Result	Year	Championship	Surface	Partner	Opponents	Score
Win	1975	Wimbledon	Grass	(United States) Sandy Mayer	(Rhodesia) Colin Dowdeswell (Australia) Allan Stone	7–5, 8–6, 6–4

== Singles performance timeline ==
Key
W	F	SF	QF	#R	RR	Q#	DNQ	A	NH

(W) winner; (F) finalist; (SF) semifinalist; (QF) quarterfinalist; (#R) rounds 4, 3, 2, 1; (RR) round-robin stage; (Q#) qualification round; (DNQ) did not qualify; (A) absent; (NH) not held; (SR) strike rate (events won / competed); (W–L) win–loss record.

Tournament	1971	1972	1973	1974	1975	1976	1977		1978	1979	1980	1981	1982	1983	1984	1985	1986	SR	W – L
Grand Slam tournaments
Australian Open (Note: The Australian Open was held twice in 1977, in January and December.)	A	A	A	A	A	A	A	W	A	A	1R	A	A	2R	2R	A	NH	1 / 4	6-3
French Open	A	A	A	A	A	A	A		A	SF	F	1R	QF	1R	2R	1R	A	0 / 7	16–7
Wimbledon	A	A	A	1R	1R	QF	SF		SF	1R	4R	4R	QF	2R	4R	3R	A	0 / 12	30–12
US Open	1R	2R	1R	2R	2R	4R	4R		SF	F	2R	SF	1R	3R	4R	3R	A	0 / 15	33–15
Win – Loss	0–1	1–1	0–1	1–2	1–2	7–2	14–2		10–2	11–3	10–4	8–3	8–3	3–4	7–4	4–3	0–0	1/38	85–37
Year-end championships
Masters Grand Prix	A	A	A	A	A	A	A		A	F	A	F	R16	A	R16	A	A	0 / 4	6–6
WCT Finals	A	A	A	A	A	A	SF		W	SF	A	A	A	SF	QF	A	A	1 / 5	7–4
Win – Loss	0–0	0–0	0–0	0–0	0–0	0–0	1–1		2–0	4–3	0–0	3–2	0–1	2–1	1–2	0–0	0–0	1 / 9	13–10
Career statistics
Tournaments played			9	20	15	19	20		18	22	22	19	20	21	22	15	2	244	
Titles – Finals			0–0	1–2	2–7	0–3	5–9		3–5	3–6	3–6	1–4	5–7	1–2	1–3	0–0	0–0	25–54	
Overall Win – Loss			7–9	33–19	38–13	31–19	60–16		46–15	64–20	52–19	43–19	61–15	32–20	34–20	12–15	0–2	510–221	
Win %			44%	63%	75%	62%	79%		75%	76%	73%	69%	80%	62%	63%	44%	0%	70%	
Year-end ranking			131	47	15	18	4		5	4	9	9	5	20	17	81	799		

== Career finals ==
=== Singles: 56 (26 titles / 30 runner-ups) ===
Result	W-L	Date	Tournament	Surface	Opponent	Score
Loss	0–1	Mar 1974	Salt Lake City, US	Hard (i)	(United States) Jimmy Connors	6–4, 6–7, 3–6
Win	1–1	Nov 1974	Vienna, Austria	Hard (i)	(Rhodesia) Andrew Pattison	6–4, 3–6, 6–3, 6–2
Loss	1–2	Jan 1975	Philadelphia WCT, US	Carpet	(United States) Marty Riessen	6–7^{(1–7)}, 7–5, 2–6, 7–6^{(7–0)}, 3–6
Loss	1–3	Feb 1975	Roanoke, US	Hard (i)	(United Kingdom) Roger Taylor	6–7, 6–7
Loss	1–4	Feb 1975	Salisbury, US	Carpet	(United States) Jimmy Connors	7–5, 5–7, 1–6, 6–3, 0–6
Win	2–4	Mar 1975	New York City, US	Carpet	(United States) Jimmy Connors	walkover
Loss	2–5	Mar 1975	Orlando WCT, US	Hard	(Australia) Rod Laver	3–6, 4–6
Win	3–5	Apr 1975	St. Louis, US	Clay	(United States) Roscoe Tanner	2–6, 6–2, 6–3
Loss	3–6	Sep 1975	Bermuda	Clay	(United States) Jimmy Connors	1–6, 4–6
Loss	3–7	Jan 1976	Indianapolis WCT, US	Carpet	(United States) Arthur Ashe	2–6, 7–6^{(8–6)}, 4–6
Loss	3–8	Feb 1976	Toronto Indoor WCT, Canada	Carpet	(Sweden) Björn Borg	6–2, 3–6, 1–6
Loss	3–9	Apr 1976	Charlotte WCT, US	Carpet	(Australia) Tony Roche	3–6, 6–3, 1–6
Loss	3–10	Feb 1977	Richmond WCT, US	Carpet	(Netherlands) Tom Okker	6–3, 3–6, 4–6
Win	4–10	Feb 1977	Ocean City, US	Hard	(United States) Robert Lutz	3–6, 6–1, 6–2
Loss	4–11	Mar 1977	Monterrey WCT, Mexico	Carpet	(Poland) Wojciech Fibak	4–6, 3–6
Loss	4–12	Apr 1977	London WCT, UK	Hard (i)	(United States) Eddie Dibbs	6–7^{(2–7)}, 7–6^{(7–5)}, 4–6
Loss	4–13	Apr 1977	Houston WCT, US	Hard	(Italy) Adriano Panatta	6–7^{(4–7)}, 7–6^{(7–3)}, 1–6
Win	5–13	May 1977	Rome, Italy	Clay	(Italy) Tonino Zugarelli	6–2, 7–6^{(7–2)}, 3–6, 7–6^{(7–5)}
Win	6–13	Oct 1977	Brisbane, Australia	Grass	(Australia) Tony Roche	6–7, 6–1, 6–1, 7–5
Win	7–13	Oct 1977	Perth, Australia	Hard	(Australia) Geoff Masters	6–3, 6–4, 6–2
Win	8–13	Dec 1977	Australian Open, Melbourne	Grass	(United Kingdom) John Lloyd	6–3, 7–6^{(7–4)}, 5–7, 3–6, 6–2
Win	9–13	Fev 1978	Richmond WCT, US	Carpet	(Australia) John Newcombe	6–3, 6–4
Loss	9–14	Mar 1978	Las Vegas, US	Hard	(Sweden) Björn Borg	5–6^{(5–7)}, 6–5^{(7–5)}, 4–6, 5–6^{(4–7)}
Loss	9–15	Apr 1978	Milan WCT, Italy	Carpet	(Sweden) Björn Borg	3–6, 3–6
Win	10–15	May 1978	WCT Finals, US	Carpet	(United States) Eddie Dibbs	6–3, 6–2, 6–1
Win	11–15	Jul 1978	Forest Hills, US	Clay	(Romania) Ilie Năstase	6–2, 6–0
Win	12–15	Feb 1979	Arkansas, Little Rock US	Carpet (i)	(United States) Butch Walts	6–2, 6–2
Loss	12–16	Feb 1979	Dorado Beach, Puerto Rico	Hard	(United States) Jimmy Connors	5–6, 0–6, 4–6
Loss	12–17	Apr 1979	Monte Carlo, Monaco	Clay	(Sweden) Björn Borg	2–6, 1–6, 3–6
Win	13–17	May 1979	Rome, Italy	Clay	(Argentina) Guillermo Vilas	6–7^{(4–7)}, 7–6^{(7–0)}, 6–7^{(5–7)}, 6–4, 6–2
Win	14–17	Jul 1979	Kitzbühel, Austria	Clay	(Czechoslovakia) Pavel Složil	6–2, 6–2, 6–4
Loss	14–18	Sep 1979	US Open, New York	Hard	(United States) John McEnroe	5–7, 3–6, 3–6
Win	15–18	Oct 1979	Sydney Indoor, Australia	Hard (i)	(Argentina) Guillermo Vilas	4–6, 6–3, 6–1, 7–6
Loss	15–19	Jan 1980	Masters, New York	Carpet	(Sweden) Björn Borg	2–6, 2–6
Loss	15–20	Feb 1980	Pepsi Grand Slam, Boca Raton	Clay	(Sweden) Björn Borg	1–6, 7–5, 1–6
Win	16–20	May 1980	Forrest Hills, US	Clay	(United States) John McEnroe	2–6, 6–2, 6–0
Loss	16–21	Jun 1980	French Open, Paris	Clay	(Sweden) Björn Borg	4–6, 1–6, 2–6
Win	17–21	Jul 1980	Stuttgart Outdoor, Germany	Clay	(Poland) Wojciech Fibak	6–2, 7–5, 6–2
Loss	17–22	Oct 1980	Sydney Indoor, Australia	Hard (i)	(United States) John McEnroe	3–6, 4–6
Win	18–22	Oct 1980	Melbourne Indoor, Australia	Carpet	(Australia) Peter McNamara	7–5, 6–3
Loss	18–23	Jan 1981	Monterrey WCT, Mexico	Carpet	(South Africa) Johan Kriek	6–7, 6–3, 6–7
Loss	18–24	Oct 1981	Melbourne Indoor, Australia	Carpet	(Australia) Peter McNamara	6–4, 1–6, 5–5 retired
Win	19–24	Nov 1981	Johannesburg, South Africa	Hard	(United States) Jeff Borowiak	6–4, 7–6, 6–1
Loss	19–25	Jan 1982	Masters, New York	Carpet	(Czechoslovakia) Ivan Lendl	7–6^{(7–5)}, 6–2, 6–7^{(6–8)}, 2–6, 4–6
Loss	19–26	Feb 1982	Genova WCT, Italy	Carpet	(Czechoslovakia) Ivan Lendl	7–6, 4–6, 4–6, 3–6
Win	20–26	Mar 1982	Brussels, Belgium	Hard (i)	(Sweden) Mats Wilander	4–6, 7–6, 6–2
Loss	20–27	Apr 1982	Zürich WCT, Switzerland	Carpet	(United States) Bill Scanlon	5–7, 6–7, 6–1, 6–0, 4–6
Win	21–27	May 1982	Florence, Italy	Clay	(Sweden) Stefan Simonsson	4–6, 6–3, 6–1
Win	22–27	Aug 1982	Toronto, Canada	Hard	(Czechoslovakia) Ivan Lendl	4–6, 6–1, 6–3
Win	23–27	Oct 1982	Melbourne Indoor, Australia	Carpet	(United States) Eliot Teltscher	2–6, 6–2, 6–2
Win	24–27	Nov 1982	Johannesburg, South Africa	Hard	(Argentina) Guillermo Vilas	7–6, 6–2, 4–6, 7–6
Loss	24–28	May 1983	Forest Hills WCT, US	Clay	(United States) John McEnroe	3–6, 5–7
Win	25–28	Oct 1983	Basel, Switzerland	Hard (i)	(Poland) Wojciech Fibak	4–6, 6–1, 7–5, 5–5 retired
Loss	25–29	Aug 1984	Toronto, Canada	Hard	(United States) John McEnroe	0–6, 3–6
Win	26–29	Nov 1984	Treviso, Italy	Carpet	(France) Tarik Benhabiles	6–1, 6–1
Loss	26–30	Nov 1984	Johannesburg, South Africa	Hard	(United States) Eliot Teltscher	3–6, 1–6, 6–7

=== Doubles: 21 (9 titles / 12 runner-ups) ===
Result	W-L	Date	Tournament	Surface	Partner	Opponents	Score
Win	1–0	Jan 1974	Roanoke, US	Carpet	(United States) Sandy Mayer	(New Zealand) Ian Crookenden (New Zealand) Jeff Simpson	7–6, 6–1
Loss	1–1	Feb 1974	Little Rock, US	Carpet	(South Africa) Bob Hewitt	(West Germany) Jürgen Fassbender (West Germany) Karl Meiler	0–6, 2–6
Win	2–1	Mar 1974	Salt Lake City, US	Indoors	(United States) Jimmy Connors	(Colombia) Iván Molina (Colombia) Jairo Velasco Sr.	2–6, 7–6, 7–5
Loss	2–2	Nov 1974	Oslo, Norway	Indoor	(United States) Jeff Borowiak	(West Germany) Karl Meiler (Pakistan) Haroon Rahim	3–6, 2–6
Win	3–2	Feb 1975	Roanoke, US	Carpet	(United States) Sandy Mayer	(Spain) Juan Gisbert (Romania) Ion Țiriac	7–6, 1–6, 6–3
Win	4–2	Jul 1975	Wimbledon, London	Grass	(United States) Sandy Mayer	(United Kingdom) Colin Dowdeswell (Australia) Allan Stone	7–5, 8–6, 6–4
Loss	4–3	Jan 1976	Indianapolis WCT, US	Carpet	(United States) Tom Gorman	(United States) Robert Lutz (United States) Stan Smith	2–6, 4–6
Win	5–3	Feb 1976	Boca Raton, US	Clay	(United States) Clark Graebner	(United States) Bruce Manson (United States) Butch Walts	6–2, 6–4
Win	6–3	Feb 1976	Fort Worth WCT, US	Carpet	(United States) Sandy Mayer	(United States) Eddie Dibbs (United States) Harold Solomon	6–4, 7–5
Loss	6–4	Apr 1976	Charlotte WCT, US	Clay	(United States) Gene Mayer	(Australia) John Newcombe (Australia) Tony Roche	3–6, 5–7
Loss	6–5	Aug 1976	South Orange, US	Clay	(Romania) Ilie Năstase	(United States) Fred McNair (United States) Marty Riessen	5–7, 6–4, 2–6
Loss	6–6	May 1977	Masters Doubles WCT, New York	Carpet	(Italy) Adriano Panatta	(India) Vijay Amritraj (United States) Dick Stockton	6–7, 6–7, 6–4, 3–6
Win	7–6	Oct 1977	Brisbane, Australia	Grass	(United States) Bill Scanlon	(Australia) Mal Anderson (Australia) Ken Rosewall	7–6, 6–4
Win	8–6	Jan 1978	Birmingham WCT, US	Carpet	(United States) Sandy Mayer	(South Africa) Frew McMillan (United States) Dick Stockton	3–6, 6–1, 7–6
Loss	8–7	Jan 1978	Philadelphia WCT, US	Carpet	(United States) Sandy Mayer	(South Africa) Bob Hewitt (South Africa) Frew McMillan	4–6, 4–6
Loss	8–8	Feb 1978	Richmond WCT, US	Carpet	(United States) Sandy Mayer	(South Africa) Bob Hewitt (South Africa) Frew McMillan	3–6, 5–7
Win	9–8	Feb 1979	Arkansas, U.S.	Hard (i)	(Czechoslovakia) Vladimír Zedník	(Australia) Phil Dent (Australia) Colin Dibley	5–7, 6–3, 7–5
Loss	9–9	Apr 1980	Monte Carlo, Monaco	Clay	(United States) John McEnroe	(Italy) Paolo Bertolucci (Italy) Adriano Panatta	2–6, 7–5, 3–6
Loss	9–10	Dec 1980	Sydney Outdoor, Australia	Grass	(United States) Brian Gottfried	(Australia) Peter McNamara (Australia) Paul McNamee	2–6, 4–6
Loss	9–11	Apr 1981	Frankfurt, Germany	Carpet	(United States) John McEnroe	(United States) Brian Teacher (United States) Butch Walts	5–7, 7–6, 5–7
Loss	9–12	Mar 1985	Rotterdam, Netherlands	Carpet	(Australia) Paul McNamee	(Czechoslovakia) Pavel Složil (Czechoslovakia) Tomáš Šmíd	4–6, 4–6

== Commemoration ==
The Vitas Gerulaitis Memorial Tennis Centre was opened in Vilnius, the capital of Lithuania. Also, a street in Vilnius is named after him. The song An Outbreak of Vitas Gerulaitis by Birkenhead band Half Man Half Biscuit, from their 1991 album McIntyre, Treadmore and Davitt also references the player, albeit obliquely.

In 2023, the book "Vitas Gerulaitis: Portrait of a Champion" was published, and in the text, both Jimmy Connors and Björn Borg said that if Gerulaitis was not inducted into the International Tennis Hall of Fame, they both would consider rescinding their inductions.

== Quote ==
"And let that be a lesson to you all. Nobody beats Vitas Gerulaitis 17 times in a row!"

– after finally defeating Jimmy Connors at the January 1980 Masters.

== Video ==
- Wimbledon Classic Match: Gerulaitis vs Borg Standing Room Only, DVD Release Date: October 31, 2006, Run Time: 180 minutes, ASIN B000ICLR8O.

Awards
Preceded by Guillermo Vilas	ATP Most Improved Player; 1975	Succeeded by Wojtek Fibak
