= Springfield International Tennis Classic =

Defunct tennis tournament
- Event name: Springfield International Tennis Classic (1977–78)
- Tour: Grand Prix circuit (1977–78)
- Founded: 1977
- Abolished: 1978
- Editions: 2
- Location: Springfield, Massachusetts
- Surface: Indoor carpet

The Springfield International Tennis Classic was a men's tennis tournament played in Springfield, Massachusetts from 1977 to 1978. The event was part of the Grand Prix tennis circuit and was held on indoor carpet courts.

It was the successor tournament to the Springfield Open a USTA satellite circuit event held from 1972 to 1974, and succeeded by the Greater Springfield Open in 1979. Both of those events were played on grass courts.

== Past finals ==
=== Singles ===
Year	Champions	Runners-up	Score
1977	(Argentina) Guillermo Vilas	(United States) Stan Smith	3–6, 6–0, 6–3, 6–2
1978	(Switzerland) Heinz Günthardt	(United States) Harold Solomon	6–3, 3–6, 6–2

=== Doubles ===
Year	Champions	Runners-up	Score
1977	(South Africa) Bob Hewitt (South Africa) Frew McMillan	(Romania) Ion Țiriac (Argentina) Guillermo Vilas	7–6, 6–2
1978	(United States) Robert Lutz (United States) Stan Smith	(Czech Republic) Jan Kodeš (United States) Marty Riessen	6–3, 6–3
