= 1977 River Plate Championships (tennis) =

Tennis tournament

- Date: 14–17 April
- Edition: 10th
- Draw: 32S / 16D
- Surface: Clay / outdoor
- Location: Buenos Aires, Argentina
- Venue: Buenos Aires Lawn Tennis Club

Champions

Singles
- (Argentina) Guillermo Vilas

Doubles
- (Poland) Wojciech Fibak / (Romania) Ion Țiriac
- River Plate Championships

The first 1977 ATP Buenos Aires official name the River Plate Championships, was an Association of Tennis Professionals men's tennis tournament that was played on outdoor clay courts at the Buenos Aires Lawn Tennis Club in Buenos Aires, Argentina and held from 14 April through 17 April 1977. First-seeded Guillermo Vilas won the singles title.

== Finals ==
=== Singles ===
(Argentina) Guillermo Vilas defeated (Poland) Wojciech Fibak 6–4, 6–3, 6–0

- It was Vilas' 2nd singles title of the year and the 21st of his career.

=== Doubles ===
(Poland) Wojciech Fibak / (Romania) Ion Țiriac defeated (Argentina) Lito Álvarez / (Argentina) Guillermo Vilas 7–5, 0–6, 7–6

- It was Fibak's 1st title of the year and the 16th of his career. It was Tiriac's 1st title of the year and the 13th of his career.
