= 1979 Richmond WCT =

- Date: January 29 – February 4
- Edition: 14th
- Category: Grand Prix (WCT)
- Draw: 32S / 16D
- Prize money: $175,000
- Surface: Carpet / indoor
- Location: Richmond, Virginia, US

Champions

Singles
- (Sweden) Björn Borg

Doubles
- (United States) Brian Gottfried / (United States) John McEnroe
- Richmond WCT

The 1979 Richmond WCT, also known by its sponsored name United Virginia Bank Classic, was a men's tennis tournament played on indoor carpet courts in Richmond, Virginia in the United States. The event was part WCT Tour which was incorporated into the 1979 Colgate-Palmolive Grand Prix circuit. It was the 14th edition of the tournament and was held from January 29 through February 4, 1979. First-seeded Björn Borg won the singles title.

== Finals ==
=== Singles ===
(Sweden) Björn Borg defeated (Argentina) Guillermo Vilas 6–3, 6–1

- It was Borg's 1st singles title of the year and the 40th of his career.

=== Doubles ===
(United States) Brian Gottfried / (United States) John McEnroe defeated (Romania) Ion Țiriac / (Argentina) Guillermo Vilas 6–4, 6–3
