= Fort Worth WCT =

Defunct tennis tournament
- Tour: World Championship Tennis
- Founded: 1975
- Abolished: 1976
- Editions: 2
- Location: Fort Worth, Texas, United States
- Surface: Hard / outdoor

The Fort Worth WCT was a men's tennis tournament played in Fort Worth, Texas from 1975 to 1976. The event was part of the WCT Tour and was held on outdoor hard courts.

== Finals ==
=== Singles ===
Year	Champions	Runners-up	Score
1975	(Australia) John Alexander	(United States) Dick Stockton	7–6, 4–6, 6–3
1976	(Argentina) Guillermo Vilas	(Australia) Phil Dent	6–7, 6–1, 6–1

=== Doubles ===
Year	Champions	Runners-up	Score
1975	(United States) Robert Lutz (United States) Stan Smith	(Australia) John Alexander (Australia) Phil Dent	6–7, 7–6, 6–3
1976	(United States) Vitas Gerulaitis (United States) Sandy Mayer	(United States) Eddie Dibbs (United States) Harold Solomon	6–4, 7–5
