= 1972 South American Open =

- Date: 27 November – 1 December
- Edition: 5th
- Category: Non-tour
- Draw: 32S / 16D
- Surface: Clay / outdoor
- Location: Buenos Aires, Argentina

Champions

Singles
- (West Germany) Karl Meiler

Doubles
- (Chile) Jaime Fillol / (Chile) Jaime Pinto-Bravo
← 1971 ·	South American Open	· 1973 →

The 1972 South American Open was a men's tennis tournament played on outdoor clay courts in Buenos Aires, Argentina from 27 November through 1 December 1972. It was held the fifth edition of the tournament and was a non-tour event, i.e. not part of the Grand Prix tennis circuit. Karl Meiler won the singles title.

== Finals ==
=== Singles ===
(West Germany) Karl Meiler defeated (Argentina) Guillermo Vilas 6–7, 2–6, 6–4, 6–4, 6–4

- It was Meiler's only ATP title of the year and the 1st of his ATP career.

=== Doubles ===
(Chile) Jaime Fillol / (Chile) Jaime Pinto-Bravo defeated (Colombia) Iván Molina / (Australia) Barry Phillips-Moore 2–6, 7–6, 6–2
