= John Alexander (Australian politician) =

Australian tennis player and politician

John Alexander OAM
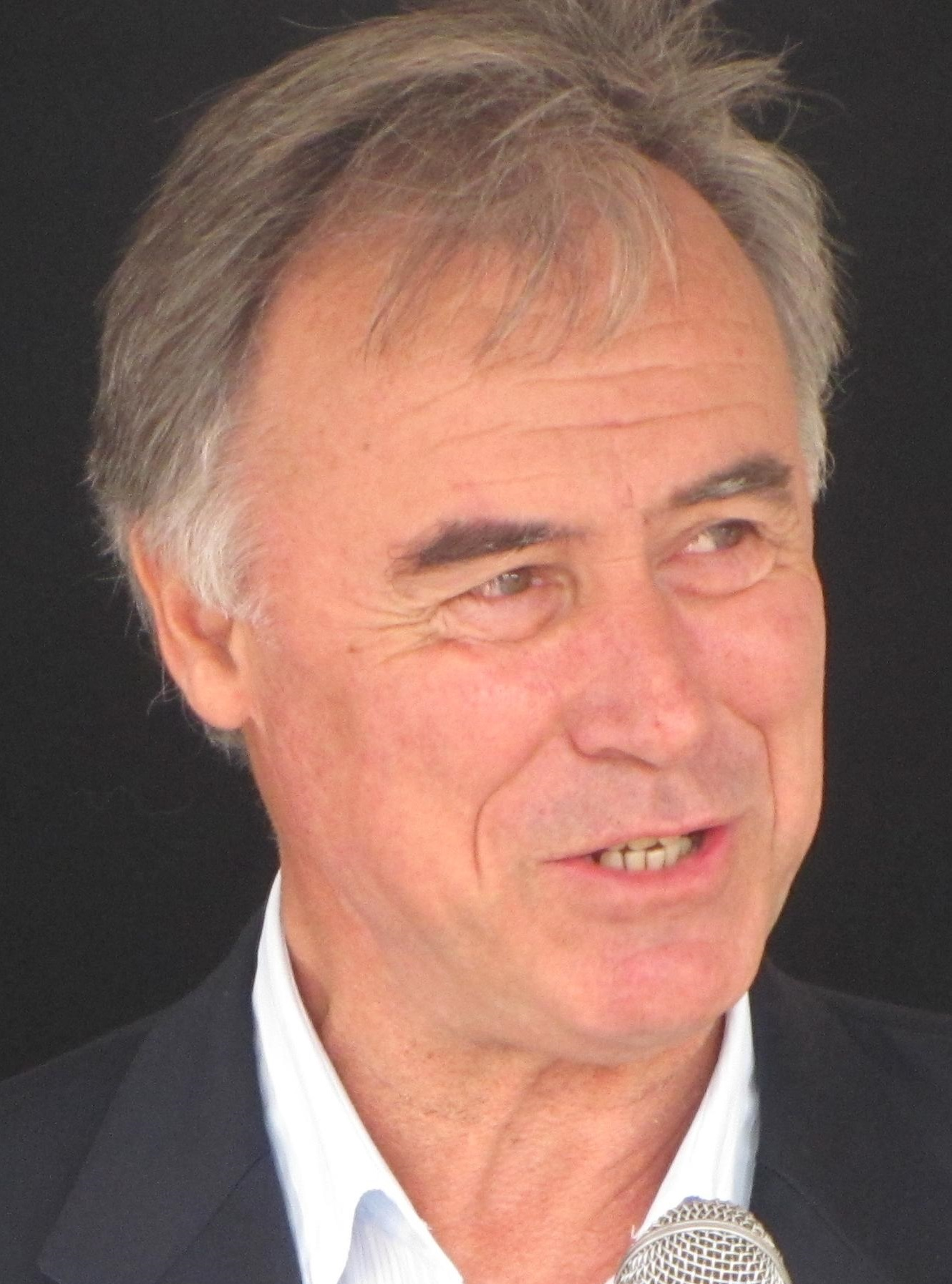
- Alexander in 2010

Member of the Australian Parliament for Bennelong
- In office 16 December 2017 – 11 April 2022
- Preceded by: Himself
- Succeeded by: Jerome Laxale
- In office 21 August 2010 – 11 November 2017
- Preceded by: Maxine McKew
- Succeeded by: Himself

Personal details
- Born: John Gilbert Alexander; 4 July 1951 (age 75) Sydney, New South Wales, Australia
- Party: Liberal Party of Australia
- Spouse: Rosemary Brown (div.)
- Occupation: Politician, tennis player, businessman
- Website: johnalexander.net.au
- Nickname: J.A.
- Tennis career
- Country (sports): Australia
- Height: 1.90 m (6 ft 3 in)
- Turned pro: 1969 (amateur tour 1967)
- Retired: 1985
- Plays: Right-handed (one-handed backhand)
- Prize money: $1,214,079

Singles
- Career record: 579–428
- Career titles: 7
- Highest ranking: No. 8 (15 December 1975)

Grand Slam singles results
- Australian Open: SF (1974, 1977^{Jan}, 1977^{Dec})
- French Open: 4R (1975, 1978, 1983)
- Wimbledon: 4R (1969, 1978)
- US Open: 4R (1971, 1973)

Other tournaments
- WCT Finals: SF (1975)

Doubles
- Career record: 451–300
- Career titles: 28
- Highest ranking: No. 15 (23 August 1977)

Grand Slam doubles results
- Australian Open: W (1975, 1982)
- French Open: F (1975)
- Wimbledon: F (1977)
- US Open: QF (1972, 1973, 1974)

Team competitions
- Davis Cup: W (1977)

John Gilbert Alexander (born 4 July 1951), nicknamed JA, is an Australian former professional tennis player, sports broadcaster, and federal politician.

As a tennis player, Alexander reached a career-high singles rank of no. 8 in the world in 1975. He reached the semi-finals of the Australian Open singles on three occasions, and won the doubles in 1975 and 1982. He also played on the Australian team that won the 1977 Davis Cup. After the end of his playing career, Alexander worked as a tennis commentator and managed various sports-related businesses.

He was a commentator for Seven Sport, the host broadcaster of the Australian Open, for more than two decades, from the late 1980s until the early 2010s, becoming the main play-by-play commentator for men's singles prime time matches in the new millennium, alongside John McEnroe and from 2005 Jim Courier. JA's final commentary duties at the Australian Open were in 2010, thereafter he moved into politics, winning his seat at the 2010 Australian federal election.

Alexander won the Division of Bennelong for the Liberal Party at the 2010 election, and retained the seat in 2013 and 2016. He resigned on 11 November 2017 due to constitutional ineligibility arising from his dual citizenship of the United Kingdom. He renounced his UK citizenship and stood as the Liberal Party candidate at the by-election, held on 16 December 2017, which he won. In November 2021, Alexander announced his retirement from politics.

== Early life ==
Alexander was born in Sydney. His father, Gilbert Alexander, was born in Essex, England, in 1907 and moved to Australia at the age of three.

== Tennis career ==
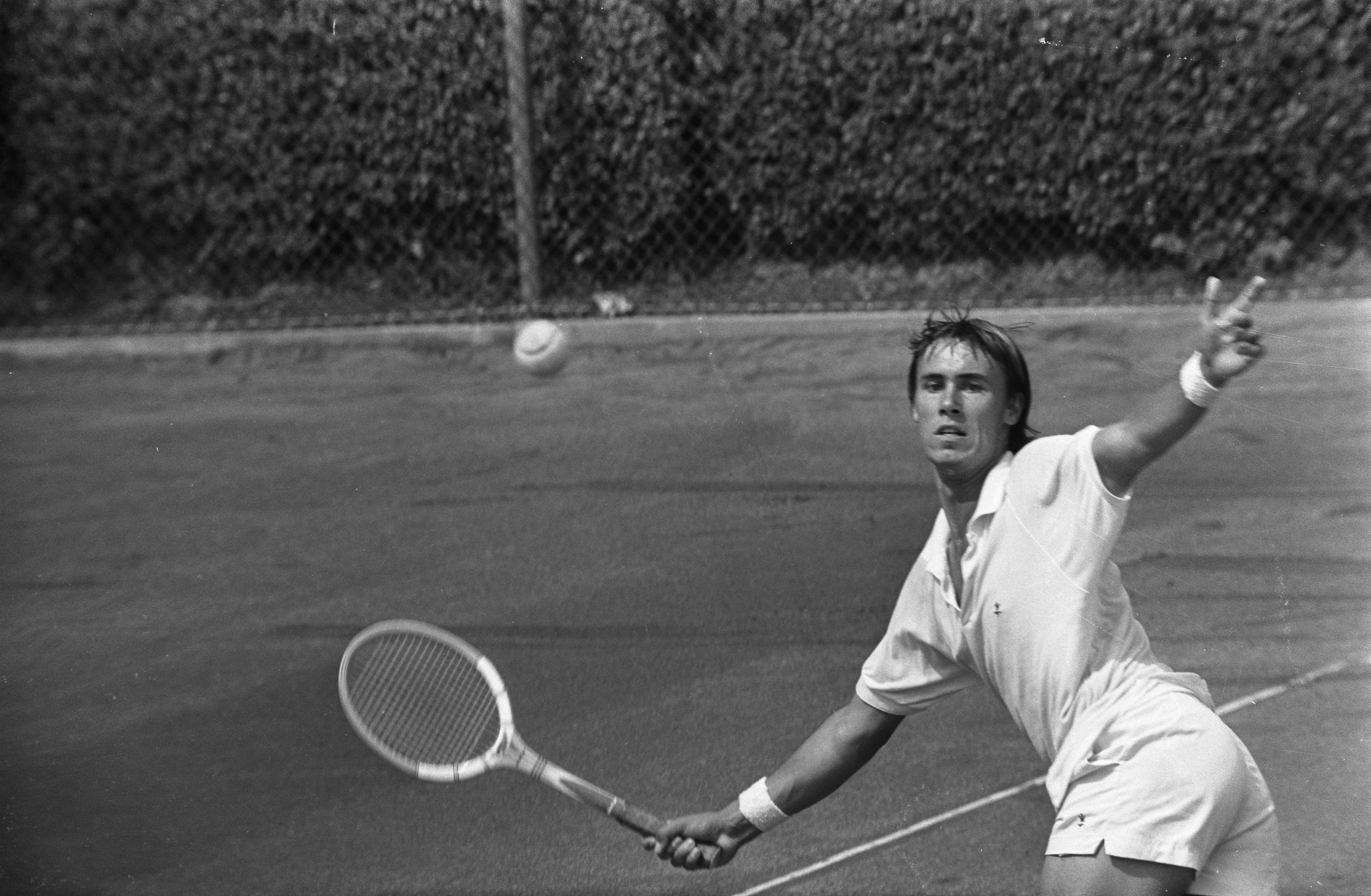
John Alexander at the 1970 International Dutch Championships in Hilversum

During a tennis career spanning the late 1960s to mid-1980s, Alexander won seven tour singles titles and 27 doubles titles, and earned a total of $1,214,079 (USD) in prize money. He achieved a career best singles ranking of World No. 8 in December 1975. Alexander is the youngest player to represent Australia in the Davis Cup. He was also one of Australia's longest serving Davis Cup players, representing his country from 1968 to 1983. From 1974 to 1986, Alexander served as the resident tennis professional at Lamar Hunt's World Championship Tennis Peachtree World of Tennis Club in Peachtree Corners, Georgia US.

Alexander served as captain of the Australian Fed Cup team and worked as a sports commentator for Australian (Channel 7) and British (BBC) television networks for over 20 years. Joining Seven in 1986, he provided play-by-play commentary and other duties for the network's Australian Open telecasts for 23 years, as well as appearing on other programs for ATN-7 Sydney, such as Seven News and 1990s reality show Gladiators. Alexander worked with colleagues including Peter Landy, Garry Wilkinson, Allan Stone, Sandy Roberts, Bruce McAvaney and Johanna Griggs, as well as John McEnroe in the early 2000s and Jim Courier from 2005 to 2010 (who remains in this position to this date, now with the Nine Network).

== Business career ==
As managing director of Next Generation Clubs Australia, Alexander designed and built sport and fitness clubs; including the Ryde Aquatic Centre in Sydney to host the 2000 Summer Olympic Games water polo event, the development of Memorial Drive in Adelaide into a multi-function health and fitness facility, and Royal King's Park in Perth.

In 1995, Alexander served as referee during the first series run of the Australian adaptation of the television series Gladiators.

Shortly before his election to Parliament in 2010, Alexander's Tennis Professionals won a High Court case for the right to redevelop the White City Tennis Centre in Sydney.

Alexander also managed a variety of small businesses in the retail and sporting sectors.

== Political career ==
Alexander is a member of the Moderate/Modern Liberal faction of the Liberal Party.

As a Liberal Party candidate, John Alexander won the seat of Bennelong from the Australian Labor Party in the 2010 election with a swing of 4.52 points, giving a two-party-preferred margin of 3.1 points.

Alexander delivered his maiden speech to parliament on 28 October 2010, detailing his particular interest in areas of preventative health, infrastructure, transport and sustainable growth. During his first term Alexander was put in charge of several internal policy committees, with a particular focus on regional development and policies to tackle urban congestion.

In October 2011 Alexander ran the inaugural Bennelong Cup Table Tennis Test match, involving players from China, Korea and Australia playing in a formal competition in Ryde, a suburb within his constituency. In October 2012 the opening games were played in the Great Hall of Parliament House, Canberra—the first competitive sporting event ever played there. The Ambassadors for China and Korea participated in a friendly competition with Alexander and Minister for Sport Kate Lundy. The Bennelong Cup is the celebration of Alexander's Bennelong Schools Table Tennis Program which has put tables in all 40 Bennelong schools to encourage social interaction between students of different cultural backgrounds, together with a healthy activity. The Bennelong Cup has continued every year since with an interschool tournament followed by international competition in Ryde, preceded by exhibition matches in Parliament House, Canberra.

Alexander has also established a range of other local programs including Bennelong Gardens, which provides work opportunities for people with disabilities in specially designed market gardens, and Bennelong Village Business program which promotes the benefits of local small business shopping and negotiates discounted advertising rates for small businesses in the local newspaper. John Alexander received much publicity for his 100 km charity walk around Bennelong to raise money and awareness of motor neurone disease after the loss of two close friends to the disease.

Alexander was not challenged in Liberal preselection in 2012. In the 2013 election Alexander was re-elected as Member for Bennelong, increasing his two party preferred margin to 7.8 points.

In September 2013 Alexander was appointed chair of the House of Representatives Standing Committee on Tax & Revenue, a role in which he worked on improving access to 'light touch' tax returns for individuals with simple tax affairs. Following this he was appointed chair of the House Standing Committee on Economics, where he instigated an inquiry into home ownership and opportunities for tax reform. Following Malcolm Turnbull's ascension to Prime Minister John Alexander was appointed chair of the newly formed House Standing Committee on Infrastructure, Transport & Cities, where he commenced an inquiry into transport connectivity, regional development, high speed rail and the use of value capture as an innovative funding mechanism.

Alexander also served as chair of the Coalition Policy Committees on Infrastructure & Regional Development, and on Tourism, of the Sydney Airport Community Forum, and of the Australia–East Asia Parliamentary Network.

As a strong proponent of high-speed rail linking Australia's eastern seaboard, Alexander delivered the keynote speech at a high-speed rail conference at University of Melbourne in February 2014, highlighting the resultant opportunities for regional development and reduction in traffic congestion in major cities.

Alexander was not challenged in Liberal preselection in 2016. In the 2016 election, he was re-elected as member for Bennelong, earning a small swing toward him despite the state – and the nation – swinging toward Labor. Alexander's hold on Bennelong was largely attributed to his high personal vote in the electorate.

During the Australian parliamentary eligibility crisis, on 6 November 2017, it was reported that Alexander might also be a British citizen and so had never been eligible for election to the Parliament. On 11 November 2017, Alexander resigned from parliament after conceding that he was likely a dual citizen, necessitating a by-election in Bennelong. He renounced his UK citizenship and stood as the Liberal Party candidate at the by-election, held on 16 December 2017. During his campaigning, a YouTube video of Alexander in the 1990s, uploaded in 2011, was resurfaced in the media. The video displays Alexander telling racist jokes at an end of year party with film crew from the 1990s TV show Gladiators. Once the video was shared with the ABC, Alexander immediately released a written statement that described how the jokes were "completely unacceptable". Alexander elaborated: "There is no place for jokes about violence against women. Again, I apologise unreservedly". Then Prime Minister, Malcolm Turnbull, praised Alexander's claims, saying his apology was "a measure of the man [...] Not all disrespect of women ends up in violence against women but that's where all violence against women begins, so all of us need to reflect on that. John has done so." Alexander's high profile opponent in the by-election, Kristina Keneally, appeared with then opposition leader Bill Shorten in Eastwood to respond to the incident. Shorten said that "The comments are crass, they're wrong, they're stupid, and the apology is 22 years too late". At a press conference, Mr Shorten denied allegations that Labor had deliberately sourced the video in an attempt to bait Alexander during the campaign. Despite this setback, Alexander was safely re-elected, despite suffering a 4.84% two party preferred swing against him to Keneally and Labor. This reduced the Liberal Party's hold in Bennelong from 9.72% to 4.88%, making the seat marginal and at its most vulnerable position for the Coalition since John Howard's reliance on preference votes in 2004 to hold the seat by 4.33%.

In the lead up to the 2019 election, Alexander was scrutinised for his comments in response to Fijian Prime Minister Frank Bainimarama. Bainimarama had asked the Australian Government to "please stop burning coal, you know the water level's just coming up and it's threatening our communities", to which Alexander responded "move to higher ground". Speaking at a community function in his electorate, Alexander elaborated: "It’s very much like your house is on fire, your children are in the house – should you call the fire brigade and get the children out of the house?" This statement was considered inflammatory by his Labor opponent, Brian Owler, who stated that "he [Alexander] says if the house is on fire to get out. Well, we don’t have a second house – or planet – to run to. It would be better if we didn’t start the fire in the first place." Bainimarama replied to Alexander in a formal statement to Fiji press members, imploring that "Fiji is lucky we even have the higher ground to allow for relocation at all. I’m keen to hear what Alexander believes the people of Kiribati should do in the face of rising seas, where the highest point in their country sits at just 1.8 metres above sea level." Alexander later appeared on ABC Radio, clarifying the nature of his remarks by saying that adaptation was "a priority [...] we must also act to prevent further damage to our planet". Despite the controversy, Alexander comfortably retained Bennelong, albeit suffering a 2.8% swing away from him.

In November 2021, Alexander opted to not contest the next election, deciding to retire from politics. Shortly following his announcement, Alexander spoke with Paul Bongiorno of The Saturday Paper, reflecting on his experiences and time in office. Alexander criticised Prime Minister Scott Morrison, claiming that "people are tired of the way we engage with each other. All we do is bash each other." Bongiorno's opinion piece later writes that Alexander 'reserves his biggest salvos for the leadership of the Coalition government: Scott Morrison, Josh Frydenberg and Barnaby Joyce', and feels that 'if Labor’s Anthony Albanese wins the election, policies more fit to serve the national interest rather than narrow sectional interest might be served'. This insight was deemed to be damaging for the Coalition, with Bennelong named as a 'key seat' for the upcoming election by ABC election analyst Antony Green. Bennelong had only been won by Labor once in nearly 80 years, and was gained for them again by Jerome Laxale at the 2022 election.

== Tennis career finals ==
=== Singles: 27 (7 titles / 20 runner-ups) ===
Result	No.	Date	Tournament	Surface	Opponent	Score
Loss	1.	Aug 1970	Kitzbühel, Austria	Clay	Željko Franulović	4–6, 7–9, 4–6
Loss	2.	Jan 1971	Hobart, Australia	Hard	Alex Metreveli	6–7, 3–6, 6–4, 3–6
Loss	3.	Jan 1971	Sydney, Australia	Hard	Phil Dent	3–6, 4–6, 4–6
Loss	4.	May 1971	Tehran, Iran	Clay	Marty Riessen	7–6, 1–6, 3–6, 6–7
Loss	5.	Dec 1972	Johannesburg, South Africa	Hard	John Newcombe	1–6, 6–7
Loss	6.	Apr 1973	Gothenburg, Sweden	Carpet (i)	Stan Smith	7–5, 4–6, 2–6
Loss	7.	Sep 1973	Seattle, United States	Hard	Tom Okker	5–7, 4–6
Loss	8.	Jan 1974	Lakeway, United States		Cliff Richey	6–7, 1–6
Loss	9.	Apr 1974	Johannesburg, South Africa	Hard	Andrew Pattison	3–6, 5–7
Win	1.	Feb 1975	Fort Worth WCT, United States	Hard	Dick Stockton	7–6^{(7–2)}, 4–6, 6–3
Loss	10.	Mar 1975	Atlanta WCT, United States	Carpet (i)	Mark Cox	3–6, 6–7^{(3–7)}
Win	2.	Mar 1975	Tucson, United States	Hard	Ilie Năstase	7–5, 6–2
Loss	11.	Jul 1975	Chicago, United States	Carpet (i)	Roscoe Tanner	1–6, 7–6, 6–7
Loss	12.	Mar 1977	St. Louis WCT, United States	Carpet (i)	Jimmy Connors	6–7^{(5–7)}, 2–6
Win	3.	Jul 1977	North Conway, United States	Clay	Manuel Orantes	2–6, 6–4, 6–4
Loss	13.	Jul 1978	Louisville, United States	Clay	Harold Solomon	2–6, 2–6
Loss	14.	Jul 1978	North Conway, United States	Clay	Eddie Dibbs	4–6, 4–6
Loss	15.	Oct 1978	Brisbane, Australia	Grass	Mark Edmondson	4–6, 6–7
Loss	16.	Mar 1979	Milan, Italy	Carpet (i)	John McEnroe	4–6, 3–6
Loss	17.	Apr 1979	Nice, France	Clay	Víctor Pecci	3–6, 2–6, 5–7
Win	4.	Jul 1979	Louisville, United States	Hard	Terry Moor	7–6, 6–7, 3–3 ret.
Loss	18.	Sep 1979	Atlanta, United States	Hard	Eliot Teltscher	3–6, 6–4, 2–6
Win	5.	Jun 1982	Bristol, England	Grass	Tim Mayotte	6–3, 6–4
Loss	19.	Sep 1982	Palermo, Italy	Clay	Mario Martinez	4–6, 5–7
Win	6.	Dec 1982	Sydney, Australia	Grass	John Fitzgerald	4–6, 7–6, 6–4
Win	7.	Jan 1983	Auckland, New Zealand	Hard	Russell Simpson	6–4, 6–3, 6–3
Loss	20.	Jul 1983	South Orange, United States	Clay	Brad Drewett	6–4, 4–6, 6–7

=== Doubles: 53 (28 titles / 25 runner-ups) ===
Result	No.	Year	Tournament	Surface	Partner	Opponents	Score
Loss	1.	1970	Australian Open, Melbourne	Grass	Phil Dent	Bob Lutz; Stan Smith	3–6, 6–8, 3–6
Loss	2.	1970	Hilversum, Netherlands	Hard	Phil Dent	Bill Bowrey; Owen Davidson	3–6, 4–6, 2–6
Win	1.	1970	Kitzbühel, Austria	Clay	Phil Dent	Željko Franulović; Jan Kodeš	10–8, 6–2, 6–4
Win	2.	1971	Sydney Outdoor, Australia	Hard	Phil Dent	Mal Anderson; Alex Metreveli	6–7, 2–6, 6–3, 7–6, 7–6
Win	3.	1971	Hamburg Masters, Germany	Clay	Andrés Gimeno	Dick Crealy; Allan Stone	6–4, 7–5, 7–9, 6–4
Win	4.	1971	Gstaad, Switzerland	Clay	Phil Dent	John Newcombe; Tom Okker	5–7, 6–3, 6–4
Win	5.	1971	Los Angeles, United States	Hard	Phil Dent	Frank Froehling; Clark Graebner	7–6, 6–4
Loss	3.	1971	Vancouver WCT, Canada	Hard	Phil Dent	Roy Emerson; Rod Laver	7–5, 7–6, 0–6, 5–7, 6–7
Loss	4.	1972	Quebec WCT, Canada	Hard (i)	Terry Addison	Bob Carmichael; Ray Ruffels	6–4, 3–6, 5–7
Loss	5.	1972	St. Louis WCT, United States	Carpet (i)	Phil Dent	John Newcombe; Tony Roche	6–7, 2–6
Win	6.	1972	Bretton Woods, United States	Hard	Fred Stolle	Nikola Pilić; Cliff Richey	7–6, 7–6
Win	7.	1972	Louisville WCT, United States	Clay	Phil Dent	Arthur Ashe; Bob Lutz	6–4, 6–3
Loss	6.	1973	Australian Open, Melbourne	Grass	Phil Dent	Mal Anderson; John Newcombe	3–6, 4–6, 6–7
Win	8.	1973	Toronto WCT, Canada	Carpet (i)	Phil Dent	Roy Emerson; Rod Laver	3–6, 6–4, 6–4, 6–2
Loss	7.	1973	Brussels WCT, Belgium	Carpet (i)	Phil Dent	Bob Lutz; Stan Smith	4–6, 6–7
Win	9.	1973	Cincinnati, United States	Clay	Phil Dent	Brian Gottfried; Raúl Ramírez	1–6, 7–6, 7–6
Loss	8.	1974	Richmond WCT, United States	Carpet (i)	Phil Dent	Nikola Pilić; Allan Stone	3–6, 6–3, 6–7
Win	10.	1974	Miami WCT, United States	Hard	Phil Dent	Tom Okker; Marty Riessen	4–6, 6–4, 7–5
Win	11.	1974	Monte Carlo WCT, Monaco	Clay	Phil Dent	Manuel Orantes; Tony Roche	7–6, 4–6, 7–6, 6–3
Loss	9.	1974	San Francisco, United States	Hard (i)	Syd Ball	Bob; Stan Smith	4–6, 6–7
Win	12.	1975	Australian Open, Melbourne	Grass	Phil Dent	Bob Carmichael; Allan Stone	6–3, 7–6
Loss	10.	1975	Fort Worth WCT, United States	Hard	Phil Dent	Bob Lutz; Stan Smith	7–6, 6–7, 3–6
Win	13.	1975	San Antonio WCT, United States	Hard	Phil Dent	Mark Cox; Cliff Drysdale	7–6, 4–6, 6–4
Loss	11.	1975	Tokyo Indoor, Japan	Carpet (i)	Phil Dent	Bob Lutz; Stan Smith	4–6, 7–6, 2–6
Win	14.	1975	Las Vegas, United States	Hard	Phil Dent	Bob Carmichael; Cliff Drysdale	6–1, 6–4
Loss	12.	1975	French Open, Paris	Clay	Phil Dent	Brian Gottfried; Raúl Ramírez	4–6, 6–2, 2–6, 4–6
Win	15.	1975	Chicago, United States	Carpet (i)	Phil Dent	Mike Cahill; John Whitlinger	6–3, 6–4
Loss	13.	1975	North Conway, United States	Clay	Phil Dent	Haroon Rahim; Erik van Dillen	6–7, 6–7
Win	16.	1976	Atlanta WCT, United States	Carpet (i)	Phil Dent	Wojtek Fibak; Karl Meiler	6–3, 6–4
Loss	14.	1976	St. Louis WCT, United States	Carpet (i)	Phil Dent	Brian Gottfried; Raúl Ramírez	4–6, 2–6
Win	17.	1976	Denver WCT, United States	Carpet (i)	Phil Dent	Jimmy Connors; Billy Martin	6–7, 6–2, 7–5
Loss	15.	1977	Houston WCT, United States	Hard	Phil Dent	Ilie Năstase; Adriano Panatta	3–6, 4–6
Loss	16.	1977	Wimbledon, London	Grass	Phil Dent	Ross Case; Geoff Masters	3–6, 4–6, 6–3, 9–8, 4–6
Win	18.	1977	Cincinnati, United States	Clay	Phil Dent	Bob Hewitt; Roscoe Tanner	6–3, 7–6
Win	19.	1977	Washington, D.C., United States	Clay	Phil Dent	Fred McNair; Sherwood Stewart	7–5, 7–5
Win	20.	1977	Louisville WCT, United States	Clay	Phil Dent	Chris Kachel; Cliff Letcher	6–1, 6–4
Loss	17.	1977	Adelaide, Australia	Grass	Phil Dent	Syd Ball; Kim Warwick	6–3, 6–7, 4–6
Win	21.	1977	Sydney Outdoor, Australia	Grass	Phil Dent	Ray Ruffels; Allan Stone	7–6, 2–6, 6–3
Loss	18.	1977	Australian Open, Melbourne	Grass	Phil Dent	Ray Ruffels; Allan Stone	6–7, 6–7
Win	22.	1978	Forest Hills WCT, United States	Clay	Phil Dent	Fred McNair; Sherwood Stewart	7–6, 7–6
Win	23.	1978	Atlanta, United States	Hard	Butch Walts	Mike Cahill; Marcello Lara	3–6, 6–4, 7–6
Win	24.	1978	Los Angeles, United States	Carpet (i)	Phil Dent	Fred McNair; Raúl Ramírez	6–3, 7–6
Win	25.	1978	Brisbane, Australia	Grass	Phil Dent	Syd Ball; Allan Stone	6–3, 7–6
Loss	19.	1979	Houston, United States	Clay	Geoff Masters	Gene Mayer; Sherwood Stewart	1–6, 7–5, 4–6
Loss	20.	1979	Adelaide, Australia	Grass	Phil Dent	Colin Dibley; Chris Kachel	7–6, 6–7, 4–6
Loss	21.	1981	Mexico City, Mexico	Clay	Ross Case	John Newcombe; Tony Roche	7–6, 3–6, 1–6
Loss	22.	1981	Maui, United States	Hard	Jim Delaney	Tony Graham; Matt Mitchell	3–6, 6–3, 6–7
Win	26.	1982	Australian Open, Melbourne	Grass	John Fitzgerald	Andy Andrews; John Sadri	6–7, 6–2, 7–6
Win	27.	1982	Sydney Outdoor, Australia	Grass	John Fitzgerald	Cliff Letcher; Craig Miller	6–4, 7–6
Win	28.	1983	Bristol Open, England	Grass	John Fitzgerald	Tom Gullikson; Johan Kriek	7–5, 6–4
Loss	23.	1984	Rome, Italy	Clay	Mike Leach	Ken Flach; Robert Seguso	6–3, 3–6, 4–6
Loss	24.	1984	Bristol, England	Grass	John Fitzgerald	Larry Stefanki; Robert Van't Hof	4–6, 7–5, 7–9
Loss	25.	1985	Bristol, England	Grass	Russell Simpson	Eddie Edwards; Danie Visser	4–6, 6–7

=== Grand Slam singles performance timeline ===
Key
W	F	SF	QF	#R	RR	Q#	DNQ	A	NH

(W) winner; (F) finalist; (SF) semifinalist; (QF) quarterfinalist; (#R) rounds 4, 3, 2, 1; (RR) round-robin stage; (Q#) qualification round; (DNQ) did not qualify; (A) absent; (NH) not held; (SR) strike rate (events won / competed); (W–L) win–loss record.

Tournament	1967	1968	1969	1970	1971	1972	1973	1974	1975	1976	1977		1978	1979	1980	1981	1982	1983	1984	1985
Australian Open	1R	A	2R	3R	3R	1R	2R	SF	QF	A	SF	SF	QF	1R	1R	3R	4R	2R	1R	1R
French Open	A	3R	1R	1R	2R	A	1R	A	4R	A	A		4R	A	A	A	1R	4R	2R	A
Wimbledon	A	2R	4R	2R	2R	A	A	2R	2R	1R	2R		4R	3R	A	1R	2R	2R	1R	A
US Open	A	A	2R	A	4R	2R	4R	3R	2R	3R	2R		1R	2R	A	1R	1R	A	A	A

== Personal ==
Alexander was briefly married, while in the United States, to a Canadian model and later married to Rosemary Brown, a former Olympic swimmer, for almost ten years. He and the former Ms. Brown have three children: Emily (1990), Georgia (1991) and Charles (1994). Alexander no longer lives in his electorate, but continued to rent an apartment in Epping.

== Honours ==
On 26 January 1992, he was awarded the Medal of the Order of Australia.

On 30 August 2000, he was awarded the Australian Sports Medal.

Parliament of Australia
Preceded by Maxine McKew	Member for Bennelong; 2010–2017, 2017–2022	Succeeded by Jerome Laxale
