= Harold Solomon =

American tennis player (born 1952)

- Country (sports): United States
- Residence: Fort Lauderdale, Florida, U.S.
- Born: September 17, 1952 (age 74) Washington D.C., U.S.
- Height: 1.68 m (5 ft 6 in)
- Turned pro: 1972 (amateur from 1971)
- Retired: 1986
- Plays: Right-handed (two-handed backhand)
- Prize money: $1,802,769

Singles
- Career record: 585–339 (63.3%)
- Career titles: 22
- Highest ranking: No. 5 (September 8, 1980)

Grand Slam singles results
- French Open: F (1976)
- Wimbledon: 1R (1972, 1974, 1977, 1986)
- US Open: SF (1977)

Other tournaments
- Tour Finals: SF (1976)
- WCT Finals: QF (1975, 1976)

Doubles
- Career record: 73–129 (36.1%)
- Career titles: 1
- Highest ranking: No. 4 (1976)

Harold Solomon (born September 17, 1952) is an American former professional tennis player who played during the 1970s and 1980s. He achieved a career-high world ranking of No. 5 in singles in 1980, and of No. 4 in doubles in 1976. Over the course of his career, he won 22 singles titles.

Solomon was inducted into the Intercollegiate Tennis Association (ITA) Hall of Fame, the USTA Mid Atlantic Section Hall of Fame, the D.C. Sports Hall of Fame, and the International Jewish Sports Hall of Fame.

== Early and personal life ==
Solomon is Jewish. He grew up in Silver Spring, Maryland and attended Springbrook High School and later lived in Pompano Beach, Florida. He lives in Fort Lauderdale, Florida, has a wife named Jan, a daughter named Rachel, and a son named Jesse.

== Tennis career ==
Solomon began playing tennis when he was five. Ranked as high as second in the United States in his junior career, Solomon won the Clay Court Championship when he was 18. He was named an All-American at Rice University, where he was a political science major and a member of Wiess College.

He turned professional when he finished university in 1972, and first won pro matches in 1974. Among his shots was the moonball—a high and deep shot, normally hit with a lot of spin.

At the French Open, Solomon's best showing was when he reached the singles final in 1976. He "pumped his two-fisted backhand like a cane-cutter", but lost to Adriano Panatta in four sets. Panatta said of Solomon that "his tennis is bizarre, I suppose, but he fights so hard". He reached the quarterfinals in 1972 and 1975 and made it to the semifinals in 1974 and 1980. At the US Open, he was a semifinalist in 1977. He won the tournament now known as the Cincinnati Open twice (in 1977 and 1980) and was a finalist at the 1976 and 1978 United States Pro Championships.

Solomon captured a total of 22 professional singles titles. His lifetime professional win–loss record is 564–315, and he earned over $1.8 million. He was ranked among the top 10 singles players worldwide in 1976, 1978, 1979, and 1980, and was among the top 20 from 1974 to 1980. His best year was in 1980 when his win–loss record was 64–23 and he was ranked No. 5 in the world. He appeared in Playgirl Magazine's list of 10 sexiest men that same year.

Solomon played doubles with Eddie Dibbs. In 1976 they were ranked No. 4 worldwide, and were among the top ten in 1974, 1975, and 1976. They were nicknamed "The Bagel Twins."

Solomon is credited with coining the term 'Bagel', referring to a set in tennis that ends with a score of 6–0. It was then popularized by commentator Bud Collins.

=== Davis Cup ===
Solomon played in the Davis Cup on the American team in 1972, 1973, 1974, and 1978. He has a record of nine wins and four losses in this competition. The US team won the Davis Cup final in 1972 (3–2 against Romania) and 1978 (4–1 against Great Britain) although Solomon did not play in either final.

== ATP ==
Solomon served as president of the Association of Tennis Professionals from 1980 to 1983 and later on its board of directors.

== Halls of Fame ==
Solomon was inducted into the USTA Mid Atlantic Section Hall of Fame in 1994 and the International Jewish Sports Hall of Fame in 2004. He was named to the Intercollegiate Tennis Association (ITA) Hall of Fame (player) in 2013. He was inducted into the D.C. Sports Hall of Fame in 2016.

== Coaching career ==
Solomon began coaching in the 1990s, working with Jennifer Capriati, Mary Joe Fernandez, Shahar Pe'er, Justin Gimelstob, Eugenie Bouchard, Allie Kiick, Jim Courier, Monica Seles, Anna Kournikova and others. Some of his players won Grand Slam events and the Olympic Games. He founded and runs the Harold Solomon Tennis Center, now known as the Florida Tennis SBT Academy, in Fort Lauderdale, Florida.

== Grand Slam finals ==
=== Singles: 1 runner-up ===
Result	Year	Championship	Surface	Opponent	Score
Loss	1976	French Open	Clay	(Italy) Adriano Panatta	1–6, 4–6, 6–4, 6–7

== Career finals ==
=== Singles: 38 (22 wins / 16 losses) ===
Category
Grand Slam
Grand Prix Masters (1970–89)
WCT Finals (1971–89)
Grand Prix Series (1970–89), WCT Series (1968–89)

Result	W/L	Date	Tournament	Surface	Opponent	Score
Win	1–0	Jul 1974	Washington D.C., US	Clay	(Argentina) Guillermo Vilas	1–6, 6–3, 6–4
Loss	1–1	Aug 1974	Bretton Woods, US	Clay	(Australia) Rod Laver	4–6, 3–6
Loss	1–2	Sep 1974	Los Angeles, US	Hard	(United States) Jimmy Connors	3–6, 1–6
Win	2–2	Feb 1975	Toronto Indoor, Canada	Carpet (i)	(United States) Stan Smith	6–4, 6–1
Win	3–2	Mar 1975	Memphis, US	Hard (i)	(Czechoslovakia) Jiří Hřebec	2–6, 6–1, 6–4
Loss	3–3	Jul 1975	Washington D.C., US	Clay	(Argentina) Guillermo Vilas	1–6, 3–6
Loss	3–4	Oct 1975	Melbourne, Australia	Grass	(United States) Brian Gottfried	2–6, 6–7, 1–6
Win	4–4	Oct 1975	Perth, Australia	Hard	(United States) Alex Mayer	6–2, 7–6, 7–5
Win	5–4	Nov 1975	Johannesburg, South Africa	Hard	(United States) Brian Gottfried	6–3, 6–2, 5–7, 6–2
Loss	5–5	Jan 1976	Monterrey WCT, Mexico	Carpet	(United States) Eddie Dibbs	6–7, 2–6
Win	6–5	Mar 1976	Washington WCT, US	Carpet (i)	(New Zealand) Onny Parun	6–3, 6–1
Win	7–5	Apr 1976	Houston WCT, US	Clay	(Australia) Ken Rosewall	6–4, 1–6, 6–1
Loss	7–6	Jun 1976	French Open, Paris	Clay	(Italy) Adriano Panatta	1–6, 4–6, 6–4, 6–7^{(3–7)}
Win	8–6	Aug 1976	Louisville Open, US	Clay	(Poland) Wojciech Fibak	6–2, 7–5
Loss	8–7	Aug 1976	Boston, US	Clay	(Sweden) Björn Borg	7–6, 4–6, 1–6, 2–6
Win	9–7	Oct 1976	Maui, US	Hard	(United States) Bob Lutz	6–3, 5–7, 7–5
Win	10–7	Nov 1976	Johannesburg, South Africa	Hard	(United States) Brian Gottfried	6–2, 6–7, 6–3, 6–4
Win	11–7	Jun 1977	Brussels, Belgium	Clay	(West Germany) Karl Meiler	7–5, 3–6, 2–6, 6–3, 6–4
Win	12–7	Jul 1977	Cincinnati Masters, US	Clay	(United Kingdom) Mark Cox	6–2, 6–3
Win	13–7	Sep 1977	WCT ToC, US	Carpet (i)	(Australia) Ken Rosewall	6–5^{(7–5)}, 6–2, 2–6, 0–6, 6–3
Loss	13–8	Feb 1978	Springfield, US	Carpet (i)	(Switzerland) Heinz Günthardt	3–6, 6–3, 2–6
Win	14–8	Apr 1978	Las Vegas, US	Hard	(Italy) Corrado Barazzutti	6–1, 3–0 ret.
Win	15–8	Jul 1978	Louisville Open, US	Clay	(Australia) John Alexander	6–2, 6–2
Loss	15–9	Aug 1978	Boston, US	Clay	(Spain) Manuel Orantes	4–6, 3–6
Loss	15–10	Dec 1978	Johannesburg, South Africa	Hard	(United States) Tim Gullikson	6–2, 6–7, 6–7, 7–6, 4–6
Win	16–10	Jan 1979	Baltimore, US	Carpet (i)	(United States) Marty Riessen	7–5, 6–4
Loss	16–11	May 1979	Hamburg, West Germany	Clay	(Spain) José Higueras	6–3, 1–6, 4–6, 1–6
Loss	16–12	Jul 1979	Forest Hills WCT, US	Clay	(United States) Eddie Dibbs	6–7, 1–6
Win	17–12	Aug 1979	North Conway, US	Clay	(Spain) José Higueras	5–7, 6–4, 7–6
Loss	17–13	Oct 1979	Bordeaux, France	Clay	(France) Yannick Noah	0–6, 7–6, 1–6, 6–1, 4–6
Win	18–13	Nov 1979	Paris Open, France	Hard (i)	(Italy) Corrado Barazzutti	6–3, 2–6, 6–3, 6–4
Loss	18–14	Nov 1979	Wembley Championship, UK	Carpet (i)	(United States) John McEnroe	3–6, 4–6, 5–7
Win	19–14	Jan 1980	Baltimore U.S.	Carpet (i)	(United States) Tim Gullikson	7–6, 6–0
Loss	19–15	Apr 1980	Las Vegas, US	Hard	(Sweden) Björn Borg	3–6, 1–6
Win	20–15	May 1980	Hamburg, West Germany	Clay	(Argentina) Guillermo Vilas	6–7, 6–2, 6–4, 2–6, 6–3
Win	21–15	Aug 1980	Cincinnati, US	Hard	(Paraguay) Francisco González	7–6, 6–3
Win	22–15	Oct 1980	Tel Aviv, Israel	Hard	(Israel) Shlomo Glickstein	6–2, 6–3
Loss	22–16	Apr 1981	Las Vegas, US	Hard	(Czechoslovakia) Ivan Lendl	4–6, 2–6

=== Grand Slam singles performance timeline ===
Key
W	F	SF	QF	#R	RR	Q#	DNQ	A	NH

(W) winner; (F) finalist; (SF) semifinalist; (QF) quarterfinalist; (#R) rounds 4, 3, 2, 1; (RR) round-robin stage; (Q#) qualification round; (DNQ) did not qualify; (A) absent; (NH) not held; (SR) strike rate (events won / competed); (W–L) win–loss record.

Tournament	1972	1973	1974	1975	1976	1977	1978	1979	1980	1981	1982	1983	1984	1985	1986	Career W-L
Australian Open	A	A	A	A	A	A	A	A	A	A	A	A	A	A	NH	0–0
French Open	QF	3R	SF	QF	F	4R	3R	4R	SF	1R	2R	A	3R	A	A	36–12
Wimbledon	1R	A	1R	A	A	1R	A	A	A	A	A	A	A	A	1R	0–4
US Open	2R	1R	A	4R	1R	SF	4R	4R	4R	3R	3R	1R	A	A	A	22–11
Win–loss	4–3	2–2	5–2	7–2	6–2	8–3	5–2	6–2	8–2	2–2	3–2	0–1	2–1	0–0	0–1	58–27

=== Doubles: 3 (1 win, 2 losses) ===
Result	W-L	Date	Tournament	Surface	Partner	Opponents	Score
Loss	0–1	Feb 1976	Fort Worth WCT, US	Carpet	(United States) Eddie Dibbs	(United States) Vitas Gerulaitis (United States) Sandy Mayer	4–6, 5–7
Win	1–1	Mar 1976	Washington WCT, US	Carpet	(United States) Eddie Dibbs	(United Kingdom) Mark Cox (South Africa) Cliff Drysdale	6–4, 7–5
Loss	0–2	Jul 1976	Cincinnati, US	Clay	(United States) Eddie Dibbs	(United States) Stan Smith (United States) Erik van Dillen	1–6, 1–6

== See also ==
- List of select Jewish tennis players
