= 1977 Argentine Championships (tennis) =

1977 ATP Buenos Aires
- Date: 21–27 November
- Edition: 11th
- Category: Grand Prix circuit (Two star)
- Draw: 32S / 16D
- Prize money: $75,000
- Surface: Clay / outdoor
- Location: Buenos Aires, Argentina

Champions

Singles
- (Argentina) Guillermo Vilas

Doubles
- (Romania) Ion Țiriac / (Argentina) Guillermo Vilas
- ATP Buenos Aires

The second 1977 ATP Buenos Aires was a men's tennis tournament held in Buenos Aires, Argentina that was part of the Grand Prix circuit and played on outdoor clay courts. It was the 11th edition of the tournament and was held from 21 November through 27 November 1977. First-seeded Guillermo Vilas won the singles title.

== Finals ==
=== Singles ===
(Argentina) Guillermo Vilas defeated (Chile) Jaime Fillol Sr. 6–2, 7–5, 3–6, 6–3

- It was Vilas's 19th title of the year and the 46th of his career.

=== Doubles ===
(Romania) Ion Țiriac / (Argentina) Guillermo Vilas defeated (Argentina) Ricardo Cano / (Spain) Antonio Muñoz

- It was Tiriac's 6th title of the year and the 18th of his career. It was Vilas's 18th title of the year and the 45th of his career.
