= Eddie Dibbs =

American tennis player (born 1951)

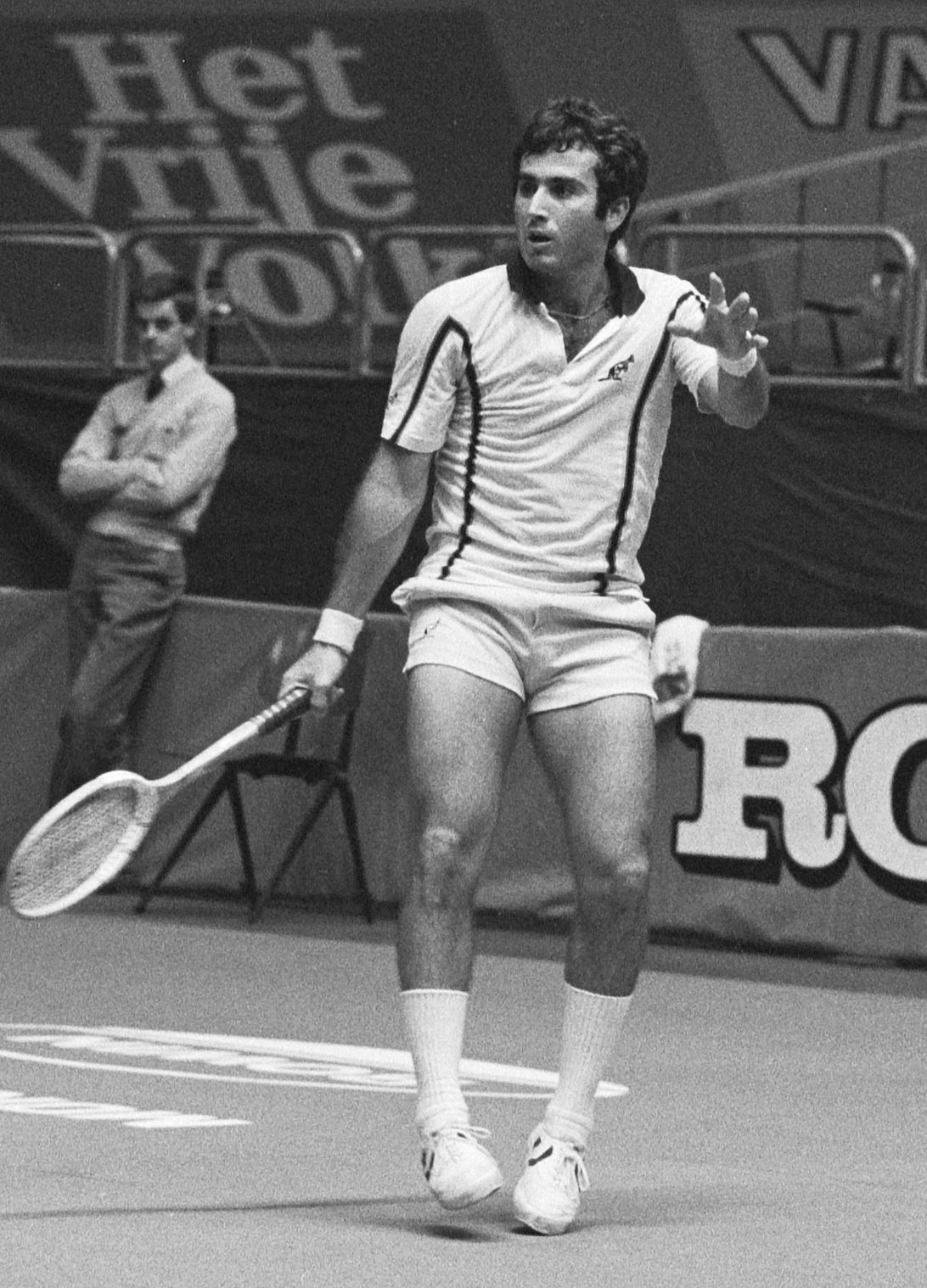
- Dibbs playing in the final of an exhibition tournament in Rotterdam.
- Country (sports): United States
- Residence: Fort Lauderdale, Florida
- Born: February 23, 1951 (age 75) Brooklyn, New York
- Height: 5 ft 7 in (1.70 m)
- Turned pro: 1972 (amateur from 1970)
- Retired: 1984
- Plays: Right-handed (two-handed backhand)
- College: University of Miami
- Prize money: $2,016,426

Singles
- Career record: 604–264
- Career titles: 22
- Highest ranking: No. 5 (July 24, 1978)

Grand Slam singles results
- French Open: SF (1975, 1976)
- Wimbledon: 2R (1974)
- US Open: QF (1975, 1976, 1979)

Other tournaments
- Tour Finals: SF (1978)
- WCT Finals: F (1978)

Doubles
- Career record: 77–106
- Career titles: 1
- Highest ranking: No. 4 (1976)

Grand Slam doubles results
- French Open: QF (1975)
- US Open: 4R (1972)

Eddie Dibbs (born February 23, 1951) is a retired American tennis player also nicknamed "Fast Eddie". He attained a career-high singles ranking of world No. 5 in July 1978, winning 22 titles and being a runner-up another 20 times.

Dibbs holds the record number of ATP Tour career match wins for a player who never reached a Grand Slam final. He did reach two semifinals, both at Roland Garros, losing to Guillermo Vilas in 1975 and to Adriano Panatta in 1976. His most significant victory was defeating Jimmy Connors, in three sets in London on carpet.

In 1976, only one other American player, Connors, had a better record than Dibbs. In 1977, Dibbs was the 2nd highest ranked American in the tour. In the 1978 season, he ended the year as the leading money winner on the professional tennis tour.

Dibbs was consistently ranked in the top 10 tour rankings for five years from 1975 to 1979. He is also the American tennis player with most singles victories in clay ever in the Open Era and ranks 7th all-time in overall singles victories on clay.

Dibbs is credited with coining the tennis term "bagel" to describe a 6–0 set. Dibbs played doubles with Harold Solomon. They were nicknamed "The Bagel Twins" by Bud Collins. In 1976, they were ranked No. 4 worldwide, and they were among the top ten also in 1974, 1975 and 1976.

A 2011 ranking system created at Northwestern University based on quality of performances and number of victories ranked Dibbs in the top 20 greatest players of all time.

== Biography ==
Dibbs was born in Brooklyn, New York to Lebanese parents. His family moved to Miami when he was a youngster where he started playing at a young age. He was a two-time state singles champion for Miami Beach High School and attended the University of Miami for three years before turning professional. At the University of Miami he compiled a 93% winning record and was an NCAA All-American twice. He was inducted in the University of Miami Sports Hall of Fame in 1987.

== Career finals ==
=== Singles: 42 (22 wins / 20 losses) ===
| Result | W-L | Date | Tournament | Surface | Opponent | Score |
|---|---|---|---|---|---|---|
| Win | 1–0 | Mar 1973 | Jackson, US | Hard (i) | (South Africa) Frew McMillan | 5–7, 6–1, 7–5 |
| Win | 2–0 | Jun 1973 | Hamburg, Germany | Clay | (West Germany) Karl Meiler | 6–1, 3–6, 7–6, 6–3 |
| Win | 3–0 | Oct 1973 | Fort Worth, US | Hard | (United States) Brian Gottfried | 7–5, 6–2, 6–4 |
| Win | 4–0 | May 1974 | Hamburg, Germany | Clay | (West Germany) Hans-Joachim Plötz | 6–2, 6–2, 6–3 |
| Loss | 4–1 | Nov 1974 | Paris Indoor, France | Hard (i) | (United States) Brian Gottfried | 3–6, 7–5, 6–8, 0–6 |
| Win | 5–1 | Oct 1975 | Tehran, Iran | Clay | (Colombia) Iván Molina | 1–6, 6–4, 7–5, 6–4 |
| Win | 6–1 | Nov 1975 | London, UK | Carpet (i) | (United States) Jimmy Connors | 1–6, 6–1, 7–5 |
| Win | 7–1 | Jan 1976 | Monterrey WCT, Mexico | Carpet | (United States) Harold Solomon | 7–6, 6–2 |
| Win | 8–1 | Feb 1976 | Barcelona, Spain | Clay | (South Africa) Cliff Drysdale | 6–1, 6–1 |
| Loss | 8–2 | Mar 1976 | Mexico City, Mexico | Clay | (Mexico) Raúl Ramírez | 6–7, 2–6 |
| Win | 9–2 | May 1976 | Hamburg, Germany | Clay | (Spain) Manuel Orantes | 6–4, 4–6, 6–1, 2–6, 6–1 |
| Loss | 9–3 | Jul 1976 | Cincinnati, US | Clay | (United States) Roscoe Tanner | 6–7, 3–6 |
| Loss | 9–4 | Oct 1976 | Madrid, Spain | Clay | (Spain) Manuel Orantes | 6–7, 2–6, 1–6 |
| Loss | 9–5 | Oct 1976 | Barcelona, Spain | Clay | (Spain) Manuel Orantes | 1–6, 6–2, 6–2, 5–7, 4–6 |
| Win | 10–5 | Oct 1976 | Paris Indoor, France | Hard (i) | (Chile) Jaime Fillol | 5–7, 6–4, 6–4, 7–6 |
| Win | 11–5 | Feb 1977 | Miami, US | Clay | (Mexico) Raúl Ramírez | 6–0, 6–3 |
| Win | 12–5 | Apr 1977 | London, UK | Hard (i) | (United States) Vitas Gerulaitis | 7–6^{(7–2)}, 6–7^{(5–7)}, 6–4 |
| Loss | 12–6 | Apr 1977 | Charlotte, US | Clay | (Italy) Corrado Barazzutti | 6–7, 0–6 |
| Loss | 12–7 | Aug 1977 | Louisville, US | Hard | (Argentina) Guillermo Vilas | 6–1, 0–6, 1–6 |
| Loss | 12–8 | Aug 1977 | Boston, US | Clay | (Spain) Manuel Orantes | 6–7, 5–7, 4–6 |
| Loss | 12–9 | Oct 1977 | Tehran, Iran | Clay | (Argentina) Guillermo Vilas | 2–6, 4–6, 6–1, 1–6 |
| Win | 13–9 | Nov 1977 | Oviedo, Spain | Hard (i) | (Mexico) Raúl Ramírez | 6–4, 6–1 |
| Loss | 13–10 | Feb 1978 | St. Louis WCT, US | Carpet (i) | (United States) Sandy Mayer | 6–7, 4–6 |
| Loss | 13–11 | Apr 1978 | Dayton, US | Carpet (i) | (United States) Brian Gottfried | 6–2, 4–6, 6–7 |
| Win | 14–11 | Apr 1978 | Tulsa, US | Hard (i) | (United States) Pat DuPré | 6–7, 6–2, 7–5 |
| Loss | 14–12 | May 1978 | WCT Finals, Dallas, US | Carpet (i) | (United States) Vitas Gerulaitis | 3–6, 2–6, 1–6 |
| Win | 15–12 | Jul 1978 | Cincinnati, US | Clay | (Mexico) Raúl Ramírez | 6–2, 6–3 |
| Loss | 15–13 | Jul 1978 | Washington, US | Clay | (United States) Jimmy Connors | 5–7, 5–7 |
| Win | 16–13 | Aug 1978 | North Conway, US | Clay | (Australia) John Alexander | 6–4, 6–4 |
| Win | 17–13 | Aug 1978 | Toronto, Canada | Clay | (Argentina) José Luis Clerc | 5–7, 6–4, 6–1 |
| Loss | 17–14 | Jan 1979 | Birmingham, US | Hard | (United States) Jimmy Connors | 2–6, 6–3, 5–7 |
| Loss | 17–15 | Apr 1979 | Tulsa, US | Hard (i) | (United States) Jimmy Connors | 7–6, 5–7, 1–6 |
| Win | 18–15 | May 1979 | Forest Hills, US | Clay | (United States) Harold Solomon | 7–6, 6–1 |
| Loss | 18–16 | Aug 1979 | Columbus, US | Clay | (United States) Brian Gottfried | 3–6, 0–6 |
| Loss | 18–17 | Oct 1979 | Barcelona, Spain | Clay | (Chile) Hans Gildemeister | 4–6, 3–6, 1–6 |
| Win | 19–17 | Feb 1980 | Sarasota, US | Clay | (Ecuador) Andrés Gómez | 6–1, 6–1 |
| Loss | 19–18 | Apr 1980 | Houston, US | Clay | (Czechoslovakia) Ivan Lendl | 1–6, 3–6 |
| Win | 20–18 | Jul 1980 | Boston, US | Clay | (United States) Gene Mayer | 6–2, 6–1 |
| Loss | 20–19 | Aug 1980 | North Conway, US | Clay | (United States) Jimmy Connors | 3–6, 7–5, 1–6 |
| Win | 21–19 | May 1981 | Forest Hills, US | Clay | (Brazil) Carlos Kirmayr | 6–3, 6–2 |
| Win | 22–19 | Nov 1981 | Quito, Ecuador | Clay | (Australia) David Carter | 3–6, 6–0, 7–5 |
| Loss | 22–22 | May 1982 | Forest Hills, US | Clay | (Czechoslovakia) Ivan Lendl | 1–6, 1–6 |

=== Doubles: 4 (1 win, 3 losses) ===
| Result | W-L | Date | Tournament | Surface | Partner | Opponents | Score |
|---|---|---|---|---|---|---|---|
| Loss | 0–1 | Feb 1976 | Fort Worth WCT, US | Carpet | (United States) Harold Solomon | (United States) Vitas Gerulaitis (United States) Sandy Mayer | 4–6, 5–7 |
| Win | 1–1 | Mar 1976 | Washington WCT, US | Carpet | (United States) Harold Solomon | (United Kingdom) Mark Cox (South Africa) Cliff Drysdale | 6–4, 7–5 |
| Loss | 1–2 | Jul 1976 | Cincinnati, US | Clay | (United States) Harold Solomon | (United States) Stan Smith (United States) Erik van Dillen | 1–6, 1–6 |
| Loss | 1–3 | Apr 1977 | London WCT, UK | Hard (i) | (United Kingdom) Mark Cox | (Romania) Ilie Năstase (Italy) Adriano Panatta | 6–7, 7–6, 3–6 |

== Grand Slam singles performance timeline ==
Key
| W | F | SF | QF | #R | RR | Q# | DNQ | A | NH |

(W) winner; (F) finalist; (SF) semifinalist; (QF) quarterfinalist; (#R) rounds 4, 3, 2, 1; (RR) round-robin stage; (Q#) qualification round; (DNQ) did not qualify; (A) absent; (NH) not held; (SR) strike rate (events won / competed); (W–L) win–loss record.

| Tournament | 1972 | 1973 | 1974 | 1975 | 1976 | 1977 | 1978 | 1979 | 1980 | 1981 | SR |
|---|---|---|---|---|---|---|---|---|---|---|---|
| Australian Open | A | A | A | A | A | A | A | A | A | A | 0 / 0 |
| French Open | A | 1R | 4R | SF | SF | 2R | QF | QF | 3R | 3R | 0 / 9 |
| Wimbledon | A | A | 2R | A | A | A | A | A | A | A | 0 / 1 |
| US Open | 2R | 1R | A | QF | QF | 3R | 3R | QF | 2R | A | 0 / 8 |
| Win–loss | 1–1 | 0–2 | 4–2 | 9–2 | 9–2 | 3–2 | 6–2 | 8–2 | 3–2 | 2–1 | 0 / 18 |
