= Björn Borg career statistics =

This is a list of the main career statistics and records of retired Swedish professional tennis player Björn Borg. His professional career spanned from 1973 until 1984 with a brief comeback between 1991 and 1993.

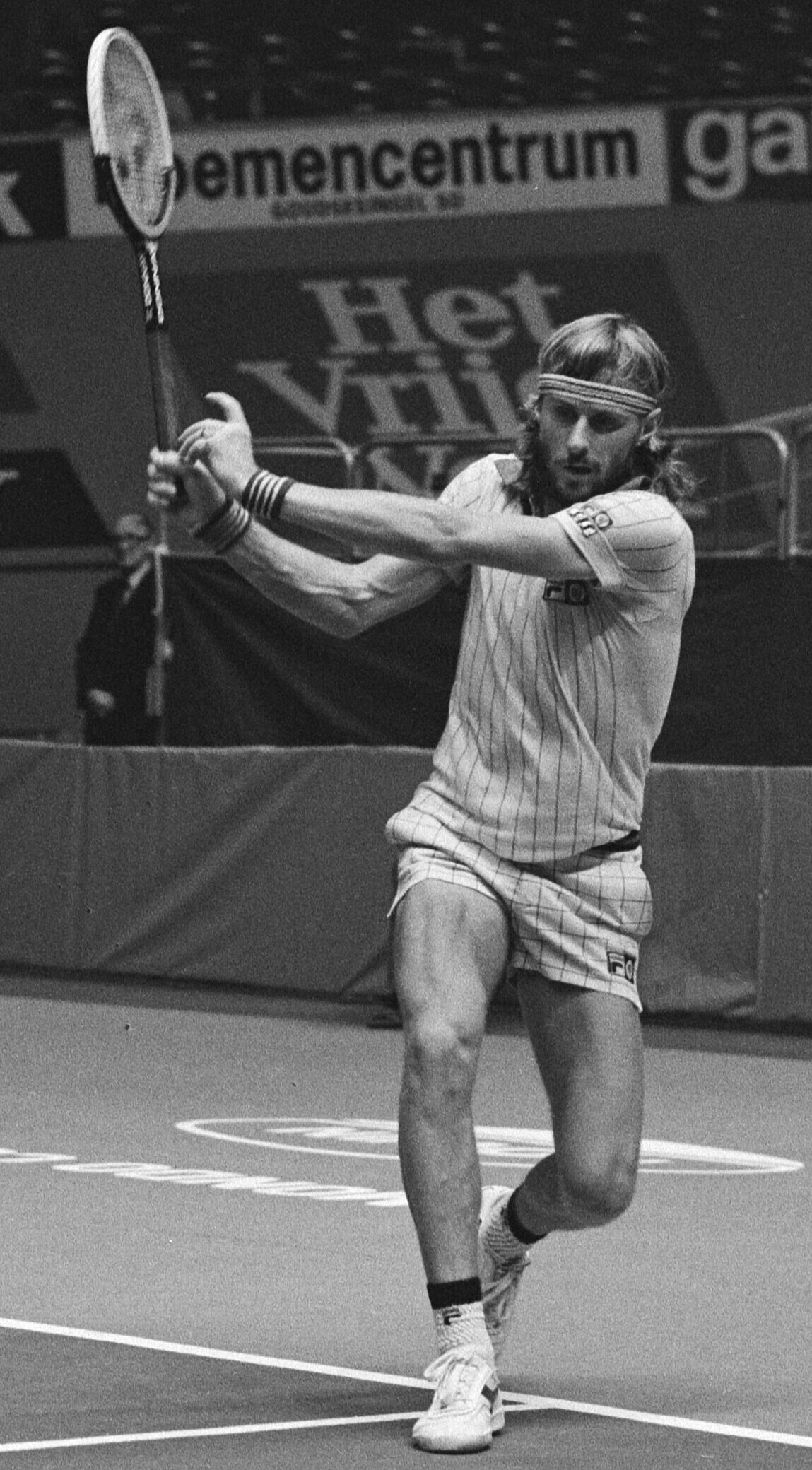
Björn Borg in 1979

== Grand Slam tournament finals ==
=== Singles: 16 finals (11 titles, 5 runner-ups) ===
Result	Year	Championship	Surface	Opponent	Score
Win	1974	French Open	Clay	(Spain) Manuel Orantes	2–6, 6–7^{(4–7)}, 6–0, 6–1, 6–1
Win	1975	French Open (2)	Clay	(Argentina) Guillermo Vilas	6–2, 6–3, 6–4
Win	1976	Wimbledon	Grass	(Romania) Ilie Năstase	6–4, 6–2, 9–7
Loss	1976	US Open	Clay	(United States) Jimmy Connors	4–6, 6–3, 6–7^{(9–11)}, 4–6
Win	1977	Wimbledon (2)	Grass	(United States) Jimmy Connors	3–6, 6–2, 6–1, 5–7, 6–4
Win	1978	French Open (3)	Clay	(Argentina) Guillermo Vilas	6–1, 6–1, 6–3
Win	1978	Wimbledon (3)	Grass	(United States) Jimmy Connors	6–2, 6–2, 6–3
Loss	1978	US Open	Hard	(United States) Jimmy Connors	4–6, 2–6, 2–6
Win	1979	French Open (4)	Clay	(Paraguay) Víctor Pecci	6–3, 6–1, 6–7^{(6–8)}, 6–4
Win	1979	Wimbledon (4)	Grass	(United States) Roscoe Tanner	6–7^{(4–7)}, 6–1, 3–6, 6–3, 6–4
Win	1980	French Open (5)	Clay	(United States) Vitas Gerulaitis	6–4, 6–1, 6–2
Win	1980	Wimbledon (5)	Grass	(United States) John McEnroe	1–6, 7–5, 6–3, 6–7^{(16–18)}, 8–6
Loss	1980	US Open	Hard	(United States) John McEnroe	6–7^{(4–7)}, 1–6, 7–6^{(7–5)}, 7–5, 4–6
Win	1981	French Open (6)	Clay	(Czechoslovakia) Ivan Lendl	6–1, 4–6, 6–2, 3–6, 6–1
Loss	1981	Wimbledon	Grass	(United States) John McEnroe	6–4, 6–7^{(1–7)}, 6–7^{(4–7)}, 4–6
Loss	1981	US Open	Hard	(United States) John McEnroe	6–4, 2–6, 4–6, 3–6

== Grand Prix year-end championships finals ==
=== Singles: 4 (2 titles, 2 runner-ups) ===
Result	Year	Championship	Surface	Opponent	Score
Loss	1975	Grand Prix Masters	Carpet (i)	(Romania) Ilie Năstase	2–6, 2–6, 1–6
Loss	1977	Grand Prix Masters	Carpet (i)	(United States) Jimmy Connors	4–6, 6–1, 4–6
Win	1979	Grand Prix Masters	Carpet (i)	(United States) Vitas Gerulaitis	6–2, 6–2
Win	1980	Grand Prix Masters	Carpet (i)	(Czechoslovakia) Ivan Lendl	6–4, 6–2, 6–2

== WCT year-end championship finals ==
=== Singles: 4 (1 title, 3 runner-ups) ===
Result	Year	Championship	Surface	Opponent	Score
Loss	1974	WCT Finals	Carpet (i)	(Australia) John Newcombe	6–4, 3–6, 3–6, 2–6
Loss	1975	WCT Finals	Carpet (i)	(United States) Arthur Ashe	6–3, 4–6, 4–6, 0–6
Win	1976	WCT Finals	Carpet (i)	(Argentina) Guillermo Vilas	1–6, 6–1, 7–5, 6–1
Loss	1979	WCT Finals	Carpet (i)	(United States) John McEnroe	5–7, 6–4, 2–6, 6–7

== Grand Prix Super Series finals ==
=== Singles: 20 (15 titles, 5 runner-ups) ===
Result	Year	Tournament	Surface	Opponent	Score
Loss	1973	Monte Carlo	Clay	(Romania) Ilie Năstase	4–6, 1–6, 2–6
Loss	1973	Stockholm	Hard (i)	(United States) Tom Gorman	3–6, 6–4, 6–7
Win	1974	Rome	Clay	(Romania) Ilie Năstase	6–3, 6–4, 6–2
Win	1974	Boston	Clay	(Netherlands) Tom Okker	7–6, 6–1, 6–1
Loss	1974	Indianapolis	Clay	(United States) Jimmy Connors	7–5, 3–6, 4–6
Win	1975	Boston	Clay	(Argentina) Guillermo Vilas	6–3, 6–4, 6–2
Win	1976	Boston	Clay	(United States) Harold Solomon	6–7, 6–4, 6–1, 6–2
Loss	1976	Philadelphia	Carpet (i)	(United States) Jimmy Connors	6–7, 4–6, 0–6
Win	1977	Monte Carlo	Clay	(Italy) Corrado Barazzutti	6–3, 7–5, 6–0
Win	1977	London	Carpet (i)	(United Kingdom) John Lloyd	6–4, 6–4, 6–3
Win	1978	Tokyo	Carpet (i)	(United States) Brian Teacher	6–3, 6–4
Win	1978	Rome	Clay	(Italy) Adriano Panatta	1–6, 6–3, 6–1, 4–6, 6–3
Win	1979	Tokyo	Carpet (i)	(United States) Jimmy Connors	6–3, 6–2
Win	1979	Monte Carlo	Clay	(United States) Vitas Gerulaitis	6–2, 6–1, 6–3
Win	1979	Toronto	Hard	(United States) John McEnroe	6–3, 6–3
Win	1979	Las Vegas	Hard	(United States) Jimmy Connors	6–3, 6–2
Win	1980	Monte Carlo	Clay	(Argentina) Guillermo Vilas	6–1, 6–0, 6–2
Loss	1980	Toronto	Hard	(Czechoslovakia) Ivan Lendl	6–4, 4–5 ret.
Win	1980	Stockholm	Carpet (i)	(United States) John McEnroe	6–3, 6–4
Win	1980	Las Vegas	Hard	(United States) Harold Solomon	6–3, 6–1, 6–2

- Note: before the ATP took over running the men's professional tour in 1990 the Grand Prix Tour had a series of events that were precursors to the Masters Series known during some years as the Grand Prix Super Series.

== Singles performance timeline ==
Key
W	F	SF	QF	#R	RR	Q#	DNQ	A	NH

(W) winner; (F) finalist; (SF) semifinalist; (QF) quarterfinalist; (#R) rounds 4, 3, 2, 1; (RR) round-robin stage; (Q#) qualification round; (DNQ) did not qualify; (A) absent; (NH) not held; (SR) strike rate (events won / competed); (W–L) win–loss record.

Tournament	1971	1972	1973	1974	1975	1976	1977		1978	1979	1980	1981	1982	1983	1984	...	1991	1992	1993	SR	W–L	Win %
Grand Slam tournaments
Australian Open	A	A	A	3R	A	A	A	A	A	A	A	A	A	A	A		A	A	A	0 / 1	1–1	50%
French Open	A	A	4R	W	W	QF	A		W	W	W	W	A	A	A		A	A	A	6 / 8	49–2	96%
Wimbledon	A	A	QF	3R	QF	W	W		W	W	W	F	A	A	A		A	A	A	5 / 9	51–4	93%
US Open	A	PR	4R	2R	SF	F	4R		F	QF	F	F	A	A	A		A	A	A	0 / 9	40–9	82%
Win–loss	0–0	0–1	10–3	11–3	16–2	17–2	10–1		20–1	18–1	20–1	19–2	0–0	0–0	0–0		0–0	0–0	0–0	11 / 28	141–17	89%
Year-end championship
The Masters (Note: The Masters tournaments for 1977, 1979 and 1980 were actually held in January of the following year. In this table, however, the year of the tournament is listed for the preceding year.)	A	A	A	RR	F	A	F		A	W	W	A	A	A	A		A	A	A	2 / 5	16–6	73%
WCT Finals	A	A	A	F	F	W	A		SF	F	A	A	A	A	A		not held			1 / 5	10–3	77%
Grand Prix Super Series
Philadelphia	A	A	A	3R	3R	F	2R		QF	A	A	A	A	A	A		not Super 9			0 / 5	7–5	58%
Las Vegas	A	A	A	A	A	A	A		A	W	W	A	A	A	A		not Super 9			2 / 2	10–0	100%
Monte Carlo	A	A	F	A	QF	QF	W		A	W	W	1R	QF	2R	A		1R	1R	A	3 / 11	24–8	75%
Hamburg	not Grand Prix Super Series								A	3R	A	A	A	A	A		A	A	A	0 / 1	2–1	67%
Rome	A	A	A	W	QF	A	A		W	A	A	A	A	A	A		A	A	A	2 / 3	15–1	94%
Indianapolis	A	A	A	F	A	A	A		not Grand Prix Super Series								not Super 9			0 / 1	5–1	83%
Boston	A	A	A	W	W	W	A		not Grand Prix Super Series								not Super 9			3 / 3	18–0	100%
Canada	A	A	QF	QF	3R	NGPSS			A	W	F	A	A	A	A		A	A	A	1 / 5	19–4	83%
Los Angeles	A	A	1R	not Grand Prix Super Series													not Super 9			0 / 1	0–1	0%
Stockholm	1R (Note: 1971 Stockholm Open was a WCT tournament.)	3R	F	SF	SF	QF	A		SF	A	W	A	A	A	A		A	A	A	1 / 8	26–7	79%
Wembley	not GPSS			A	A	A	W		A	A	A	A	A	A	NGS		not Super 9			1 / 1	5–0	100%
Tokyo	not Grand Prix Super Series								W	W	QF	2R	A	A	A		not Super 9			2 / 4	13–2	87%
National representation
Davis Cup	A	EZ	EZ	EZ	W	A	A		SF	EZ	EZ	A	A	A	A		A	A	A	1 / 7	37–3	93%
Career statistics
	1971	1972	1973	1974	1975	1976	1977		1978	1979	1980	1981	1982	1983	1984	...	1991	1992	1993	Career		
Titles	0	0	0	8	5	7	12		9	13	9	3	0	0	0		0	0	0	66		
Finals	0	0	5	14	9	9	14		10	14	12	6	0	0	0		0	0	0	93		
Overall W–L	0–1	12–13	51–24	94–24	89–19	59–12	78–7		79–7	84–6	70–6	35–6	2–1	1–1	0–1		0–1	0–8	0–3	654–140		
Win %	0%	48%	68%	80%	82%	83%	92%		92%	93%	92%	85%	67%	50%	0%		0%	0%	0%	82%		
Year-end ranking	N/A	N/A	18	3	3	2	3		2	1	1	4	262	281	741		1131	769	1120	$ 3,655,751		

== Career finals ==
=== Singles titles (66) ===
Tournament category	No. of titles
Grand Slam tournaments	11
Year-end championships – Grand Prix	2
Year-end championships – WCT	1
Grand Prix Super Series	15
Grand Prix Regular Series – WCT Regular Series	37

Titles by surface
Clay – outdoor (32)
Grass – outdoor (7)
Hard – outdoor (3)
Hard – indoor (2)
Carpet – indoor (22)

Result	No.	Date	Tournament	Surface	Opponent	Score
Win	1.	Jan 1974	Auckland, New Zealand	Grass	(New Zealand) Onny Parun	6–4, 6–3, 6–1
Win	2.	Feb 1974	London WCT, England	Carpet (i)	(United Kingdom) Mark Cox	6–7^{(4–7)}, 7–6^{(8–6)}, 6–4
Win	3.	Mar 1974	São Paulo WCT, Brazil	Carpet (i)	(United States) Arthur Ashe	6–2, 3–6, 6–3
Win	4.	Jun 1974	Rome, Italy	Clay	(Romania) Ilie Năstase	6–3, 6–4, 6–2
Win	5.	Jun 1974	French Open, Paris	Clay	(Spain) Manuel Orantes	2–6, 6–7^{(4–7)}, 6–0, 6–1, 6–1
Win	6.	Jul 1974	Båstad, Sweden	Clay	(Italy) Adriano Panatta	6–3, 6–0, 6–7^{(2–7)}, 6–3
Win	7.	Aug 1974	Boston, U.S.	Clay	(Netherlands) Tom Okker	7–6^{(7–3)}, 6–1, 6–1
Win	8.	Dec 1974	Adelaide, Australia	Grass	(New Zealand) Onny Parun	6–4, 6–4, 3–6, 6–2
Win	9.	Feb 1975	Richmond WCT, U.S.	Carpet (i)	(United States) Arthur Ashe	4–6, 6–4, 6–4
Win	10.	Feb 1975	Bologna WCT, Italy	Carpet (i)	(United States) Arthur Ashe	7–6^{(7–4)}, 4–6, 7–6^{(7–4)}
Win	11.	Jun 1975	French Open, Paris (2)	Clay	(Argentina) Guillermo Vilas	6–2, 6–3, 6–4
Win	12.	Aug 1975	Boston, U.S. (2)	Clay	(Argentina) Guillermo Vilas	6–3, 6–4, 6–2
Win	13.	Oct 1975	Barcelona, Spain	Clay	(Italy) Adriano Panatta	1–6, 7–6, 6–3, 6–2
Win	14.	Feb 1976	Toronto Indoor WCT, Canada	Carpet (i)	(United States) Vitas Gerulaitis	2–6, 6–3, 6–1
Win	15.	Apr 1976	São Paulo WCT, Brazil (2)	Carpet (i)	(Argentina) Guillermo Vilas	7–6^{(7–4)}, 6–2
Win	16.	May 1976	WCT Finals – Dallas, U.S.	Carpet (i)	(Argentina) Guillermo Vilas	1–6, 6–1, 7–5, 6–1
Win	17.	May 1976	Düsseldorf, West Germany	Clay	(Spain) Manuel Orantes	6–2, 6–2, 6–0
Win	18.	Jul 1976	Wimbledon, London	Grass	(Romania) Ilie Năstase	6–4, 6–2, 9–7
Win	19.	Aug 1976	Boston, U.S. (3)	Clay	(United States) Harold Solomon	6–7^{(3–7)}, 6–4, 6–1, 6–2
Win	20.	Oct 1976	Hilton Head, U.S.	Clay	(United States) Arthur Ashe	6–1, 6–2
Win	21.	Jan 1977	Boca Raton, U.S.	Clay	(United States) Jimmy Connors	6–4, 5–7, 6–3
Win	22.	Mar 1977	Memphis, U.S.	Carpet (i)	(United States) Brian Gottfried	6–4, 6–3, 4–6, 7–5
Win	23.	Apr 1977	Nice, France	Clay	(Argentina) Guillermo Vilas	6–4, 1–6, 6–2, 6–0
Win	24.	Apr 1977	Monte Carlo WCT, Monaco	Clay	(Italy) Corrado Barazzutti	6–3, 7–5, 6–0
Win	25.	Apr 1977	Denver, U.S.	Carpet (i)	(United States) Brian Gottfried	7–5, 6–2
Win	26.	Jul 1977	Wimbledon, London (2)	Grass	(United States) Jimmy Connors	3–6, 6–2, 6–1, 5–7, 6–4
Win	27.	Sep 1977	Hilton Head, U.S. (2)	Clay	(United States) Roscoe Tanner	6–4, 7–5
Win	28.	Oct 1977	Madrid, Spain	Clay	(Chile) Jaime Fillol	6–3, 6–0, 6–7, 7–6
Win	29.	Oct 1977	Barcelona, Spain (2)	Clay	(Spain) Manuel Orantes	6–2, 7–5, 6–2
Win	30.	Oct 1977	Basel, Switzerland	Hard (i)	(United Kingdom) John Lloyd	6–4, 6–2, 6–3
Win	31.	Nov 1977	Cologne, West Germany	Hard (i)	(Poland) Wojtek Fibak	2–6, 7–5, 6–3
Win	32.	Nov 1977	Wembley, England	Carpet (i)	(United Kingdom) John Lloyd	6–4, 6–4, 6–3
Win	33.	Jan 1978	Birmingham WCT, U.S.	Carpet (i)	(United States) Dick Stockton	7–6^{(7–4)}, 7–5
Win	34.	Jan 1978	Boca Raton, U.S. (2)	Clay	(United States) Jimmy Connors	7–6^{(7–1)}, 3–6, 6–1
Win	35.	Mar 1978	Las Vegas, U.S.	Carpet (i)	(United States) Vitas Gerulaitis	6–5^{(7–5)}, 5–6^{(5–7)}, 6–4, 6–5^{(7–4)}
Win	36.	Apr 1978	Milan WCT, Italy	Carpet (i)	(United States) Vitas Gerulaitis	6–3, 6–3
Win	37.	May 1978	Rome, Italy (2)	Clay	(Italy) Adriano Panatta	1–6, 6–3, 6–1, 4–6, 6–3
Win	38.	Jun 1978	French Open, Paris (3)	Clay	(Argentina) Guillermo Vilas	6–1, 6–1, 6–3
Win	39.	Jul 1978	Wimbledon, London (3)	Grass	(United States) Jimmy Connors	6–2, 6–2, 6–3
Win	40.	Jul 1978	Båstad, Sweden (2)	Clay	(Italy) Corrado Barazzutti	6–1, 6–2
Win	41.	Nov 1978	Tokyo Indoor, Japan	Carpet (i)	(United States) Brian Teacher	6–3, 6–4
Win	42.	Feb 1979	Richmond WCT, U.S. (2)	Carpet (i)	(Argentina) Guillermo Vilas	6–3, 6–1
Win	43.	Feb 1979	Boca Raton, U.S. (3)	Clay	(United States) Jimmy Connors	6–2, 6–3
Win	44.	Apr 1979	Rotterdam, Netherlands	Carpet (i)	(United States) John McEnroe	6–4, 6–2
Win	45.	Apr 1979	Monte Carlo, Monaco (2)	Clay	(United States) Vitas Gerulaitis	6–2, 6–1, 6–3
Win	46.	Apr 1979	Las Vegas, U.S.	Hard	(United States) Jimmy Connors	6–3, 6–2
Win	47.	Jun 1979	French Open, Paris (4)	Clay	(Paraguay) Víctor Pecci	6–3, 6–1, 6–7^{(6–8)}, 6–4
Win	48.	Jul 1979	Wimbledon, London (4)	Grass	(United States) Roscoe Tanner	6–7^{(4–7)}, 6–1, 3–6, 6–3, 6–4
Win	49.	Jul 1979	Båstad, Sweden (3)	Clay	(Hungary) Balázs Taróczy	6–1, 7–5
Win	50.	Aug 1979	Toronto, Canada	Hard	(United States) John McEnroe	6–3, 6–3
Win	51.	Sep 1979	Palermo, Italy	Clay	(Italy) Corrado Barazzutti	6–4, 6–0, 6–4
Win	52.	Nov 1979	Tokyo Indoor, Japan (2)	Carpet (i)	(United States) Jimmy Connors	6–2, 6–2
Win	53.	Dec 1979	Montreal, Canada	Carpet (i)	(United States) Jimmy Connors	6–4, 6–2, 2–6, 6–4
Win	54.	Jan 1980	Masters, New York	Carpet (i)	(United States) Vitas Gerulaitis	6–2, 6–2
Win	55.	Feb 1980	Boca Raton, U.S. (4)	Clay	(United States) Vitas Gerulaitis	6–1, 5–7, 6–1
Win	56.	Feb 1980	Salisbury, Maryland, U.S.	Carpet (i)	(India) Vijay Amritraj	7–5, 6–1, 6–3
Win	57.	Mar 1980	Nice, France (2)	Clay	(Spain) Manuel Orantes	6–2, 6–0, 6–1
Win	58.	Apr 1980	Monte Carlo, Monaco (3)	Clay	(Argentina) Guillermo Vilas	6–1, 6–0, 6–2
Win	59.	Apr 1980	Las Vegas, U.S. (2)	Hard	(United States) Harold Solomon	6–3, 6–1
Win	60.	Jun 1980	French Open, Paris (5)	Clay	(United States) Vitas Gerulaitis	6–4, 6–1, 6–2
Win	61.	Jul 1980	Wimbledon, London (5)	Grass	(United States) John McEnroe	1–6, 7–5, 6–3, 6–7^{(16–18)}, 8–6
Win	62.	Nov 1980	Stockholm, Sweden	Carpet (i)	(United States) John McEnroe	6–3, 6–4
Win	63.	Jan 1981	Masters, New York (2)	Carpet (i)	(Czechoslovakia) Ivan Lendl	6–4, 6–2, 6–2
Win	64.	Jun 1981	French Open, Paris (6)	Clay	(Czechoslovakia) Ivan Lendl	6–1, 4–6, 6–2, 3–6, 6–1
Win	65.	Jul 1981	Stuttgart Outdoor, West Germany	Clay	(Czechoslovakia) Ivan Lendl	1–6, 7–6^{(7–0)}, 6–2, 6–4
Win	66.	Sep 1981	Geneva, Switzerland	Clay	(Czechoslovakia) Tomáš Šmíd	6–4, 6–3

=== Runner-ups (27) ===
Result	No.	Date	Tournament	Surface	Opponent	Score
Loss	1.	1973	Monte Carlo, Monaco	Clay	(Romania) Ilie Năstase	4–6, 1–6, 2–6
Loss	2.	1973	Beckenham, England	Clay	(Soviet Union) Alex Metreveli	3–6, 8–9
Loss	3.	1973	San Francisco, U.S.	Hard	(Australia) Roy Emerson	7–5, 1–6, 4–6
Loss	4.	1973	Stockholm, Sweden	Hard (i)	(United States) Tom Gorman	3–6, 6–4, 6–7
Loss	5.	1973	Buenos Aires, Argentina	Clay	(Argentina) Guillermo Vilas	6–3, 7–6, 4–6, 6–6 ret.
Loss	6.	1974	Barcelona WCT, Spain	Carpet (i)	(United States) Arthur Ashe	4–6, 6–3, 3–6
Loss	7.	1974	Houston, U.S.	Clay	(Australia) Rod Laver	6–7, 2–6
Loss	8.	1974	WCT Finals – Dallas, U.S.	Carpet (i)	(Australia) John Newcombe	6–4, 3–6, 3–6, 2–6
Loss	9.	1974	Indianapolis, U.S.	Clay	(United States) Jimmy Connors	7–5, 3–6, 4–6
Loss	10.	1974	Madrid, Spain	Clay	(Romania) Ilie Năstase	4–6, 7–5, 2–6, 6–4, 4–6
Loss	11.	1974	Hilton Head, U.S.	Carpet	(Romania) Ilie Năstase	6–7, 3–6
Loss	12.	1975	Barcelona WCT, Spain	Carpet (i)	(United States) Arthur Ashe	6–7, 3–6
Loss	13.	1975	Munich WCT, West Germany	Carpet (i)	(United States) Arthur Ashe	4–6, 6–7
Loss	14.	1975	WCT Finals – Dallas, U.S.	Carpet (i)	(United States) Arthur Ashe	6–3, 4–6, 4–6, 0–6
Loss	15.	1975	Masters, Stockholm	Carpet (i)	(Romania) Ilie Năstase	2–6, 2–6, 1–6
Loss	16.	1976	Philadelphia WCT, U.S.	Carpet (i)	(United States) Jimmy Connors	6–7, 4–6, 0–6
Loss	17.	1976	US Open, New York	Clay	(United States) Jimmy Connors	4–6, 6–3, 6–7, 4–6
Loss	18.	1977	Masters, New York	Carpet (i)	(United States) Jimmy Connors	4–6, 6–1, 4–6
Loss	19.	1977	Johannesburg	Hard	(Argentina) Guillermo Vilas	Final abandoned
Loss	20.	1978	US Open, New York	Hard	(United States) Jimmy Connors	4–6, 4–6, 2–6
Loss	21.	1979	WCT Finals – Dallas, U.S.	Carpet (i)	(United States) John McEnroe	5–7, 6–4, 2–6, 6–7
Loss	22.	1980	Toronto, Canada	Hard	(Czechoslovakia) Ivan Lendl	6–4, 4–5 ret.
Loss	23.	1980	US Open, New York	Hard	(United States) John McEnroe	6–7, 1–6, 7–6, 7–5, 4–6
Loss	24.	1980	Basel, Switzerland	Hard (i)	(Czechoslovakia) Ivan Lendl	3–6, 2–6, 7–5, 6–0, 4–6
Loss	25.	1981	Milan, Italy	Carpet (i)	(United States) John McEnroe	6–7^{(2–7)}, 4–6
Loss	26.	1981	Wimbledon, London	Grass	(United States) John McEnroe	6–4, 6–7, 6–7, 4–6
Loss	27.	1981	US Open, New York	Hard	(United States) John McEnroe	6–4, 2–6, 4–6, 3–6

=== Singles titles – invitational tournaments exhibitions, or special events (35) ===
==== Non-ATP, exhibition, invitational, or special events – draw ≥ 8 (9) ====
Year	Date	Tournament	Surface	Opponent	Score
1973	1 February	Helsinki – Scandinavian Indoor Open	Carpet (i)	(Poland) Jacek Niedźwiedzki	6–3, 6–7, 6–3, 6–4
1974	28 January	Oslo – Scandinavian Indoor Open	Carpet (i)	(South Africa) Raymond Moore	2–6, 6–4, 6–4, 6–1
1978	19 October	Hamburg – Rothenbaum Tennis Club	Carpet (i)	(Poland) Wojciech Fibak	6–1, 6–1
1979	28 September	Marbella – European Championships of Tennis	Clay	(Italy) Adriano Panatta	6–2, 6–2, 7–5
1979	26 November	Milan – Masters Brooklyn Chewing Gum	Carpet (i)	(United States) John McEnroe	1–6, 6–1, 6–4
1979	29 November	Frankfurt – Cup Invitational Tennis Round Robin	Carpet (i)	(United States) Jimmy Connors	6–3, 4–6, 6–3, 6–4
1981	12 October	Edmonton – Alberta Tennis Challenge	Carpet (i)	(Argentina) José Luis Clerc	6–2, 6–2, 7–5
1984	10 May	Osaka – Gunze World Tennis	Carpet (i)	(United States) Bill Scanlon	6–2, 6–2
1985	12 May	Kobe & Tokyo – Gunze World Tennis	Carpet (i)	(Sweden) Anders Järryd	6–4, 6–3

==== Non-ATP, exhibition, invitational, or special events – draw < 8 (26) ====
Year	Date	Tournament	Surface	Opponent	Score
1976	Sept 14–16	Guadalajara, Jalisco Tennis Invitational Round Robin	Clay	(Romania) Ilie Năstase	6–3, 6–3
1976	Sept 17–19	Mexico Marlboro Tennis Round Robin	Clay	(Romania) Ilie Năstase	7–6, 0–6, 6–1
1976	Nov 3–4	Chicago Olsonite Tennis Classic	Carpet (i)	(Australia) John Newcombe	6–3, 6–2
1976	Nov 6–7	Detroit Michigan Pro Tennis 4-men invitational	Carpet (i)	(Australia) Rod Laver	6–3, 6–1
1976	Nov 24–28	Copenhagen Pondus Cup Invitational Round Robin	Carpet (i)	(Poland) Wojciech Fibak	7–5, 3–6, 7–6, 7–5
1977	Feb 12–13	Cincinnati Riverfront Coliseum Invitational Round Robin – 3-men	Carpet (i)	(Australia) Rod Laver	6–7, 6–3, 6–2
1978	Mar 7–9	Gothenburg Scandinavian Cup	Carpet (i)	(United States) Vitas Gerulaitis	6–4, 1–6, 6–3
1978	Apr 18–20	Copenhagen Pondus Cup Invitational	Carpet (i)	(United States) Vitas Gerulaitis	2–6, 6–4, 6–4
1978	Apr 21–23	Tokyo Suntory Cup	Carpet (i)	(United States) Jimmy Connors	6–1, 6–2
1978	Aug 14–15	Menton French Riviera Invitational	Clay	(Argentina) Guillermo Vilas	6–4, 6–3
1978	Aug 16–17	Fréjus Arena Trophy	Clay	(Argentina) Guillermo Vilas	7–6, 7–5
1978	Oct 16–18	Essen Gruga Hall International	Clay	(United States) Vitas Gerulaitis	6–3, 7–6
1978	Oct 28–29	Manila Smash-78 Tennis	Clay	(United States) Vitas Gerulaitis	6–2, 7–6
1978	Nov 23–24	Antwerp European Tennis Championships	Carpet (i)	(Netherlands) Tom Okker	6–4, 6–3
1979	March 6–7	Vienna Velo Cup Tennis – 4-men invitational	Carpet (i)	(United States) John McEnroe	3–6, 6–1, 6–4
1979	Sept 26–27	Essen Gruga Hall International – 4-men invitational	Clay	(Romania) Ilie Năstase	6–1, 6–4
1979	Oct 2–7	Netherlands – 5 city Roxy Tennis Round Robin – 5-men	Carpet (i)	(United States) Eddie Dibbs	6–3, 6–0
1979	Nov 24–25	Brussels Belgian Cup – 4-men invitational	Carpet (i)	(Italy) Adriano Panatta	6–1, 7–6
1979	Dec 14–16	Cairo Egypt's First International Round Robin	Clay	(Egypt) Ismail El Shafei	6–2, 6–3
1980	March 8–9	Stuttgart Cup-80 – 4-men invitational	Carpet (i)	(Italy) Adriano Panatta	6–2, 5–7, 6–1
1980	Oct 25–26	West Berlin Cup – 4-men invitational	Carpet (i)	(United States) Vitas Gerulaitis	7–6, 6–3
1981	Jan 26–27	Bologna Charity Indoor Championships – 4-men invitational	Carpet (i)	(Argentina) José Luis Clerc	6–7, 7–5, 7–6
1982	March 24–25	Cascais Portugal Classic – 4-men invitational	Carpet (i)	(United States) Vitas Gerulaitis	7–6, 6–1
1982	April 16–18	Tokyo – Suntory Cup	Carpet (i)	(Argentina) Guillermo Vilas	6–1, 6–2
1982	30 April–1 May	Cairo Four Master Championships 4-men invitational	Clay	(Australia) Peter McNamara	6–1 6–4
1982	Nov 5–7	Sydney – Akai Gold Challenge Round Robin	Carpet (i)	(Czechoslovakia) Ivan Lendl	6–1, 6–4, 6–2

== Records and statistics ==
=== Youngest to win ===
- In 1972 Borg became the youngest winner of a Davis Cup match at age 15.
- Borg won his 11th Grand Slam singles title in 1981 aged 25 years and one day, the youngest male to reach that number of titles. By comparison, Roger Federer won his 11th aged 25 years and 324 days; Rafael Nadal was aged 26 years and 8 days; Pete Sampras won his 11th at almost age 27, Novak Djokovic at age 28, Roy Emerson at age 30, and Rod Laver at age 31.

=== Statistics ===
- Borg's 66 official ATP career titles as listed on the Association of Tennis Professionals (ATP) website places him eighth on the Open Era list behind Jimmy Connors (109), Roger Federer (103), Ivan Lendl (94), Rafael Nadal (86), Novak Djokovic (81), John McEnroe (77), Rod Laver (72).
- In 1979, Borg became the first tennis player to earn more than one million dollars in prize money in a single season.
- On the list of open era winning streaks, Borg is first and second (49 consecutive tour matches in 1978, 48 in 1979–1980). The only other men with winning streaks of at least 40 matches are Guillermo Vilas (46), Ivan Lendl (44), Novak Djokovic (43), John McEnroe (42), and Roger Federer (41).
- Borg holds third place for most consecutive wins on clay, with 46 victories in 1977–79. Only Rafael Nadal with 81 and Vilas with 53 have won more consecutive clay court matches.
- Borg won 19 consecutive points on serve in the fifth set on two occasions: his 1980 Wimbledon final against McEnroe and his 1980 US Open quarterfinal against Roscoe Tanner.
- Borg retired in 1983 with $3.6 million in career prize money, a record at the time.
- According to the match scores listed on the ATP website, Borg bageled his opponents (sets won 6–0) 131 times in his career, compared to Federer's 93 bagels from 1999 through 2019 Basel.
- Borg was inducted into the International Tennis Hall of Fame in 1987 at 30 years of age.
- In 1999, Borg was elected the best Swedish sportsman ever by a jury in his home country. His tennis rivals included a pair of top ranked players: Mats Wilander (who won seven Grand Slam titles) and Stefan Edberg (who won six).
- In their only career match-up, Borg defeated Wilander in September 1981 in the first round of a tournament in Geneva, Switzerland. The score was 6–1, 6–1. Geneva was the last tournament that Borg won during his career.
- Borg won the Svenska Dagbladet Gold Medal in 1974 and 1978, the latter being shared with alpine skier Ingemar Stenmark. They are the only men to have won this honor twice.

== Top 10 head-to-head record ==
Borg's record against players ranked in the ATP's top 10. World No. 1's are in bold.

- Guillermo Vilas (17–5)
- **Jimmy Connors** (15–8)
- Vitas Gerulaitis (17–0)
- Harold Solomon (15–0)
- Manuel Orantes (12–4)
- Adriano Panatta (10–6)
- Arthur Ashe (9–8)
- Eddie Dibbs (14–0)
- Roscoe Tanner (12–4)
- **Ilie Năstase** (10–7)
- Raúl Ramírez (11–3)
- **John McEnroe** (7–7)
- Brian Gottfried (9–2)
- Tom Okker (9–2)
- Corrado Barazzutti (10–0)
- Gene Mayer (7–1)
- **Ivan Lendl** (6–2)
- Jan Kodeš (6–2)
- Víctor Pecci (6–1)
- Dick Stockton (6–1)
- Wojciech Fibak (6–1)
- **Rod Laver** (6–2)
- Peter Fleming (5–1)
- **Stan Smith** (5–2)
- John Alexander (4–1)
- Yannick Noah (4–1)
- José Luis Clerc (4–0)
- Tom Gorman (3–1)
- Sandy Mayer (3–1)
- **John Newcombe** (2–3)
- Brian Teacher (3–0)
- Cliff Drysdale (3–0)
- Tony Roche (1–1)
- Roger Taylor (1–1)
- Andrés Gómez (1–0)
- **Ken Rosewall** (1–0)
- **Mats Wilander** (1–0)
- Wayne Ferreira (0–1)
- **Pancho Gonzales** (0–1)

== Junior career finals ==
=== Grand Slam finals ===
==== Singles: 1 (1–0) ====
Result	Year	Championship	Surface	Opponent	Score
Win	1972	Wimbledon	Grass	(United Kingdom) Buster Mottram	6–3, 4–6, 7–5
