= 1978 Swedish Open – Singles =

Singles
- 1978 Swedish Open

Final
- Champion: (Sweden) Björn Borg
- Runner-up: (Italy) Corrado Barazzutti
- Score: 6–1, 6–2

Details
- Draw: 32
- Seeds: 8

Events
Singles	Doubles
← 1977 ·	Swedish Open	· 1979 →

The 1978 Swedish Open – Singles event was part of the 1978 Swedish Open tennis tournament and was played on outdoor clay courts in Båstad, Sweden between 17 July and 23 July 1973. Corrado Barazzutti was the defending Swedish Open champion. First-seeded Björn Borg won the title by defeating second-seeded Barazzutti in the final, 6–1, 6–2.

== Seeds ==
1. (Sweden) Björn Borg (champion)
2. (Italy) Corrado Barazzutti (final)
3. (Hungary) Balázs Taróczy (semifinals)
4. (Sweden) Kjell Johansson (quarterfinals)
5. (New Zealand) Chris Lewis (quarterfinals)
6. (South Africa) Raymond Moore (quarterfinals)
7. (United States) Mike Fishbach (first round)
8. (United Kingdom) Colin Dowdeswell (first round)

== Draw ==
=== Key ===
- Q = Qualifier
- WC = Wild card
- LL = Lucky loser
- Alt = Alternate
- ITF = ITF entry
- PR = Protected ranking
- SR = Special ranking
- SE = Special exempt
- JE = Junior exempt
- JR = Junior Accelerator Programme entrant
- CO = College Accelerator Programme entrant
- NG = Next Gen Accelerator Program entrant
- w/o = Walkover
- r = Retired
- d = Defaulted

=== Finals ===
Semifinals
1	(Sweden) Björn Borg	6	6
(Spain) Antonio Muñoz	4	1
3	(Hungary) Balázs Taróczy	3	6	5
2	(Italy) Corrado Barazzutti	6	1	7

Final
1	(Sweden) Björn Borg	6	6
2	(Italy) Corrado Barazzutti	1	2

=== Top half ===
First Round
1	(Sweden) Björn Borg	6	6
Q	(United States) Tony Giammalva	1	0
(Australia) Bob Carmichael	6	6
Q	(Sweden) Per Larsson	3	2
Q	(Spain) Ángel Giménez	0	6	2
(United Kingdom) Jonathan Smith	6	2	6
(Spain) Javier Soler	2	1
5	(New Zealand) Chris Lewis	6	6
4	(Sweden) Kjell Johansson	1	6	6
(France) Christophe Roger-Vasselin	6	2	4
(France) François Jauffret	2	1
(Netherlands) Louk Sanders	6	6
(Sweden) Birger Andersson	6	7
Q	(Sweden) Ulf Eriksson	1	6
(Spain) Antonio Muñoz	7	6
8	(United Kingdom) Colin Dowdeswell	6	1

Second Round
1	(Sweden) Björn Borg	6	6
(Australia) Bob Carmichael	0	0
(United Kingdom) Jonathan Smith	2	4
5	(New Zealand) Chris Lewis	6	6
4	(Sweden) Kjell Johansson	6	6
(Netherlands) Louk Sanders	4	2
(Sweden) Birger Andersson	6	6	3
(Spain) Antonio Muñoz	7	4	6

Quarterfinals
1	(Sweden) Björn Borg	7	6
5	(New Zealand) Chris Lewis	6	3
4	(Sweden) Kjell Johansson	6	2	4
(Spain) Antonio Muñoz	3	6	6

Semifinals
1	(Sweden) Björn Borg	6	6
(Spain) Antonio Muñoz	4	1

=== Bottom half ===
First Round
7	(United States) Mike Fishbach	0	6	3
(Austria) Hans Kary	6	3	6
(Australia) Mark Edmondson	6	4
(Italy) Gianni Ocleppo	3	0^{r}
(Sweden) Per Hjertquist	7	6
(Sweden) Jan Norbäck	5	0
(Australia) Barry Phillips-Moore	1	1
3	(Hungary) Balázs Taróczy	6	6
6	(South Africa) Raymond Moore	7	7
(Chile) Álvaro Fillol	6	6
(Hungary) Péter Szőke	5	3
(Czechoslovakia) Stanislav Birner	7	6
(Sweden) Tenny Svensson	3	4
(Sweden) Ove Bengtson	6	6
(Sweden) Douglas Palm	1	4
2	(Italy) Corrado Barazzutti	6	6

Second Round
(Austria) Hans Kary	2	3
(Australia) Mark Edmondson	6	6
(Sweden) Per Hjertquist	7	2	3
3	(Hungary) Balázs Taróczy	5	6	6
6	(South Africa) Raymond Moore	7	7
(Czechoslovakia) Stanislav Birner	6	6
(Sweden) Ove Bengtson	7	2	0
2	(Italy) Corrado Barazzutti	6	6	6

Quarterfinals
(Australia) Mark Edmondson	4	6
3	(Hungary) Balázs Taróczy	6	7
6	(South Africa) Raymond Moore	1	6
2	(Italy) Corrado Barazzutti	6	7

Semifinals
3	(Hungary) Balázs Taróczy	3	6	5
2	(Italy) Corrado Barazzutti	6	1	7
