= 1978 Swedish Open – Doubles =

Doubles
- 1978 Swedish Open

Final
- Champion: (Australia) Bob Carmichael (Australia) Mark Edmondson
- Runner-up: (Hungary) Péter Szőke (Hungary) Balázs Taróczy
- Score: 7–5, 6–4

Details
- Draw: 16
- Seeds: 4

Events
Singles	Doubles
← 1977 ·	Swedish Open	· 1979 →

The 1978 Swedish Open – Doubles event was part of the 1978 Swedish Open tennis tournament and was played on outdoor clay courts in Båstad, Sweden between 17 July and 23 July 1973. Mark Edmondson and John Marks were the defending Swedish Open champions but did not compete together in this edition. First-seeded team of Bob Carmichael and Mark Edmondson won the doubles title by defeating Péter Szőke and Balázs Taróczy in the final, 7–5, 6–4.

== Seeds ==
1. (Australia) Bob Carmichael / (Australia) Mark Edmondson (champions)
2. (Chile) Álvaro Fillol / (United States) Mike Fishbach (quarterfinals)
3. (South Africa) Raymond Moore / (United Kingdom) Jonathan Smith (semifinals)
4. (France) François Jauffret / (France) Christophe Roger-Vasselin (semifinals)

== Draw ==
=== Key ===
- Q = Qualifier
- WC = Wild card
- LL = Lucky loser
- Alt = Alternate
- ITF = ITF entry
- PR = Protected ranking
- SR = Special ranking
- SE = Special exempt
- JE = Junior exempt
- JR = Junior Accelerator Programme entrant
- CO = College Accelerator Programme entrant
- NG = Next Gen Accelerator Program entrant
- w/o = Walkover
- r = Retired
- d = Defaulted

First Round
1	(Australia) Bob Carmichael (Australia) Mark Edmondson	6	6
(Sweden) Kjell Johansson (Netherlands) Louk Sanders	4	0
(Austria) Hans Kary (New Zealand) Chris Lewis	6	6
(Sweden) Ulf Eriksson (Sweden) Per Hjertquist	3	1
(United States) Michael Benson (United States) Tony Giammalva	6	4	7
(Sweden) Birger Andersson (Czechoslovakia) Stanislav Birner	4	6	6
(Sweden) Per Larsson (Sweden) Stefan Simonsson	3	1
3	(South Africa) Raymond Moore (United Kingdom) Jonathan Smith	6	6
4	(France) François Jauffret (France) Christophe Roger-Vasselin	6	6
(Spain) Ángel Giménez (Spain) Antonio Muñoz	4	4
(Sweden) Ove Bengtson (Sweden) Tenny Svensson	6	6
(United States) Jim McManus (Australia) Barry Phillips-Moore	2	3
(Hungary) Péter Szőke (Hungary) Balázs Taróczy	w/o
(Italy) Corrado Barazzutti (Italy) Gianni Ocleppo
(Sweden) Jan Norbäck (Sweden) Jan-Eric Palm	1	3
2	(Chile) Álvaro Fillol (United States) Mike Fishbach	6	6

Quarterfinals
1	(Australia) Bob Carmichael (Australia) Mark Edmondson	6	6
(Austria) Hans Kary (New Zealand) Chris Lewis	3	4
(United States) Michael Benson (United States) Tony Giammalva	4	1
3	(South Africa) Raymond Moore (United Kingdom) Jonathan Smith	6	6
4	(France) François Jauffret (France) Christophe Roger-Vasselin	6	6
(Sweden) Ove Bengtson (Sweden) Tenny Svensson	2	4
(Hungary) Péter Szőke (Hungary) Balázs Taróczy	7	7
2	(Chile) Álvaro Fillol (United States) Mike Fishbach	5	6

Semifinals
1	(Australia) Bob Carmichael (Australia) Mark Edmondson	7	3	6
3	(South Africa) Raymond Moore (United Kingdom) Jonathan Smith	5	6	1
4	(France) François Jauffret (France) Christophe Roger-Vasselin	4	3
(Hungary) Péter Szőke (Hungary) Balázs Taróczy	6	6

Final
1	(Australia) Bob Carmichael (Australia) Mark Edmondson	7	6
(Hungary) Péter Szőke (Hungary) Balázs Taróczy	5	4
