= 1977 Cologne Cup =

Tennis cup

- Date: 31 October – 6 November
- Edition: 2nd
- Category: Grand Prix (One star)
- Draw: 32S / 16D
- Prize money: $50,000
- Surface: Carpet / indoor
- Location: Cologne, West Germany

Champions

Singles
- (Sweden) Björn Borg

Doubles
- (South Africa) Bob Hewitt / (South Africa) Frew McMillan
- Cologne Grand Prix

The 1977 Cologne Cup, also known as the Cologne Grand Prix, was a men's tennis tournament played on indoor carpet courts in Cologne, West Germany that was part of the 1977 Colgate-Palmolive Grand Prix circuit and categorized as a One Star event. It was the second edition of the tournament and was held from 31 October through 6 November 1977. First-seeded Björn Borg won the singles title and the accompanying $10,000 first-prize money

== Finals ==
=== Singles ===
(Sweden) Björn Borg defeated (Poland) Wojciech Fibak 2–6, 7–5, 6–3

- It was Borg's 11th singles title of the year and the 31st of his career.

=== Doubles ===
(South Africa) Bob Hewitt / (South Africa) Frew McMillan defeated (United States) Fred McNair / (United States) Sherwood Stewart 6–3, 7–5
