= 1977 Torneo Godó =

- Date: 17–23 October
- Edition: 25th
- Category: Grand Prix circuit
- Draw: 64S / 32D
- Prize money: $100,000
- Surface: Clay / outdoor
- Location: Barcelona, Catalonia, Spain
- Venue: Real Club de Tenis Barcelona

Champions

Singles
- (Sweden) Björn Borg

Doubles
- (Poland) Wojciech Fibak / (Czechoslovakia) Jan Kodeš
- Torneo Godó

The 1977 Torneo Godó or Trofeo Conde de Godó was a tennis tournament that took place on outdoor clay courts at the Real Club de Tenis Barcelona in Barcelona, Catalonia in Spain. It was the 25th edition of the tournament and was part of the 1977 Grand Prix circuit. It was held from 17 October 17 until 23 October 1977. First-seeded Björn Borg won the singles title.

== Finals ==
=== Singles ===
(Sweden) Björn Borg defeated (Spain) Manuel Orantes 6–2, 7–5, 6–2

- It was Borg's 8th singles title of the year and the 27th of his career.

=== Doubles ===
(Poland) Wojciech Fibak / (Czechoslovakia) Jan Kodeš defeated (South Africa) Bob Hewitt / (South Africa) Frew McMillan 6–0, 6–4
