= 1980 Alan King Tennis Classic =

- Date: April 21–27
- Edition: 9th
- Category: Grand Prix circuit
- Draw: 32S/16D
- Prize money: $300,000
- Surface: Hard / outdoor
- Location: Las Vegas, United States
- Venue: Caesars Palace

Champions

Singles
- (Sweden) Björn Borg

Doubles
- (United States) Bob Lutz / (United States) Stan Smith
- Alan King Tennis Classic

The 1980 Alan King Tennis Classic, also known as the Alan King-Ceasers Palace Tennis Classic, was a men's tennis tournament played on outdoor hard courts at the Caesars Palace in Las Vegas, United States. It was the ninth edition of the event and was part of the 1980 Volvo Grand Prix circuit. The tournament was held from April 21 through April 27, 1980. First-seeded Björn Borg won the singles title and the accompanying $60,000 first-prize money. It was Borg's second successive singles title at the tournament.

== Finals ==
=== Singles ===
(Sweden) Björn Borg defeated (United States) Harold Solomon 6–3, 6–1

- It was Borg's 5th singles title of the year and the 57th of his career.

=== Doubles ===
(United States) Bob Lutz / (United States) Stan Smith defeated (Poland) Wojciech Fibak / (United States) Gene Mayer 6–2, 7–5
