= 1981 Mercedes Cup =

- Date: 13–19 July
- Edition: 4th
- Category: Grand Prix
- Draw: 32S / 16D
- Prize money: $75,000
- Surface: Clay / outdoor
- Location: Stuttgart, West Germany
- Venue: Tennis Club Weissenhof

Champions

Singles
- (Sweden) Björn Borg

Doubles
- (Australia) Peter McNamara / (Australia) Paul McNamee
- Stuttgart Open

The 1981 Mercedes Cup, was a men's tennis tournament played on outdoor clay courts and held at the Tennis Club Weissenhof in Stuttgart, West Germany that was part of the 1981 Grand Prix circuit. It was the fourth edition of the tournament and was held from 13 July until 19 July 1981. First-seeded Björn Borg won the singles title.

== Finals ==
=== Singles ===
(Sweden) Björn Borg defeated (Czechoslovakia) Ivan Lendl, 1–6, 7–6, 6–2, 6–4

- It was Borg's 2nd singles title of the year and the 63rd of his career.

=== Doubles ===
(Australia) Peter McNamara / (Australia) Paul McNamee defeated (West Germany) Mark Edmondson / (United States) Mike Estep, 2–6, 6–4, 7–6
