= 1977 United Bank Classic =

- Date: April 18–24
- Edition: 6th
- Category: Grand Prix (3 star)
- Draw: 32S / 16D
- Prize money: $100,000
- Surface: Carpet / indoor
- Location: Denver, Colorado, U.S.

Champions

Singles
- (Sweden) Björn Borg

Doubles
- (Australia) Colin Dibley / (Australia) Geoff Masters
- Denver Open

The 1977 United Bank Classic, also known as the Denver WCT, was a men's tennis tournament played on indoor carpet courts in Denver, Colorado in the United States that was part of the 3 star category of the 1977 Grand Prix circuit. It was the sixth edition of the tournament and took place from April 18 through April 24, 1977. First-seeded Björn Borg won the singles competition.

== Finals ==
=== Singles ===
(Sweden) Björn Borg defeated (United States) Brian Gottfried 7–5, 6–2

- It was Borg's 4th singles title of the year and the 23rd of his career.

=== Doubles ===
(Australia) Colin Dibley / (Australia) Geoff Masters defeated (Australia) Syd Ball / (Australia) Kim Warwick 6–2, 6–3
