= 1977 Benson & Hedges Championships =

- Date: 14–18 November
- Edition: 2nd
- Draw: 32S / 16D
- Prize money: $125,000
- Surface: Carpet / indoor
- Location: London, England
- Venue: Wembley Arena

Champions

Singles
- (Sweden) Björn Borg

Doubles
- (United States) Sandy Mayer / (South Africa) Frew McMillan
- Wembley Championships

The 1977 Benson & Hedges Championships, also known as the Wembley Championships, was a men's tennis tournament played on indoor carpet courts at the Wembley Arena in London, England that was part of the 1977 Colgate-Palmolive Grand Prix. It was the second edition of the tournament and was held from 14 November until 18 November 1977. First-seeded Björn Borg won the singles title.

== Finals ==
=== Singles ===
(Sweden) Björn Borg defeated (United Kingdom) John Lloyd 6–4, 6–4, 6–3

- It was Borg's 11th singles title of the year and the 30th of his career.

=== Doubles ===
(South Africa) Frew McMillan / (United States) Sandy Mayer defeated (United States) Brian Gottfried / (Mexico) Raúl Ramírez 6–3, 7–6
