= 1977 Swiss Indoors =

- Date: 25–30 October
- Edition: 9th
- Category: Grand Prix (One star)
- Draw: 32S / 16D
- Prize money: $50,000
- Surface: Carpet / indoor
- Location: Basel, Switzerland
- Venue: St. Jakobshalle

Champions

Singles
- (Sweden) Björn Borg

Doubles
- (United States) Mark Cox / (United Kingdom) Buster Mottram
- Swiss Indoors

The 1977 Swiss Indoors was a men's tennis tournament played on indoor carpet courts at the St. Jakobshalle in Basel, Switzerland that was part of the 1977 Colgate-Palmolive Grand Prix. It was the ninth edition of the tournament and was held from 25 October through 30 October 1977. First-seeded Björn Borg won the singles title.

== Finals ==
=== Singles ===
(Sweden) Björn Borg defeated (United Kingdom) John Lloyd 6–4, 6–2, 6–3

- It was Borg's 9th singles title of the year and the 28th of his career.

=== Doubles ===
(United Kingdom) Mark Cox / (United Kingdom) Buster Mottram defeated (United Kingdom) John Feaver / (Australia) John James 7–5, 6–4, 6–3
