= 1979 Campionati Internazionali di Sicilia =

- Date: 17–23 September
- Edition: 1st
- Category: Grand Prix
- Draw: 32S / 16D
- Prize money: $75,000
- Surface: Clay / outdoor
- Location: Palermo, Italy

Champions

Singles
- (Sweden) Björn Borg

Doubles
- (Australia) Peter McNamara / (Australia) Paul McNamee
Campionati Internazionali di Sicilia	· 1980 →

The 1979 Campionati Internazionali di Sicilia, also known as the Palermo Grand Prix or Palermo Open, was a men's tennis tournament played on outdoor clay courts in Palermo, Italy that was part of the 1979 Colgate-Palmolive Grand Prix. It was the inaugural edition of the tournament and took place from 17 September until 23 September 1979. First-seeded Björn Borg won the singles title.

== Finals ==
=== Singles ===
(Sweden) Björn Borg defeated (Italy) Corrado Barazzutti 6–4, 6–0, 6–4

- It was Borg's 10th singles title of the year and the 49th of his career.

=== Doubles ===
(Australia) Peter McNamara / (Australia) Paul McNamee defeated (Egypt) Ismail El Shafei / (United Kingdom) John Feaver 7–5, 7–6
