= 1976 WCT World Doubles =

- Date: April 28 – May 2
- Edition: 4th
- Draw: 8D
- Prize money: $100,000
- Surface: Carpet / indoor
- Location: Kansas City, U.S.
- Venue: Municipal Auditorium

Champions

Doubles
- (Poland) Wojciech Fibak / (West Germany) Karl Meiler
- WCT World Doubles

The 1976 WCT World Doubles was a men's tennis tournament played on indoor carpet courts at the Municipal Auditorium in Kansas City, Missouri in the United States that was part of the 1976 World Championship Tennis circuit. It was the tour finals for the doubles season of the WCT Tour. It was the fourth edition of the tournament and was held from April 28 through May 2, 1976. Wojciech Fibak and Karl Meiler won the title and earned $40,000.

== Final ==
=== Doubles ===
(Poland) Wojciech Fibak / (West Germany) Karl Meiler defeated (United States) Robert Lutz / (United States) Stan Smith 6–2, 2–6, 3–6, 6–3, 6–4

== See also ==
- 1976 World Championship Tennis Finals
