= 1974 New Zealand Open =

Tennis tournament

- Date: 7–13 January
- Edition: 7th
- Category: Independent
- Draw: 32S / 16D
- Prize money: $20,000
- Surface: Grass
- Location: Auckland, New Zealand

Champions

Men's singles
- (Sweden) Björn Borg

Women's singles
- (Australia) Evonne Goolagong

Men's doubles
- (Sweden) Björn Borg / (Australia) Ray Ruffels
← 1973 ·	ATP Auckland Open	· 1975 →

The 1974 New Zealand Open, also known as Benson and Hedges Open for sponsorship reasons, was a professional men's and women's tennis tournament held in Auckland, New Zealand. It was an independent event, i.e. not part of the 1974 Grand Prix or 1974 World Championship Tennis circuit. It was the seventh edition of the tournament and was played on outdoor grass courts from 7 January through 13 January 1974. Björn Borg and Evonne Goolagong won the singles titles.

== Finals ==
=== Men's singles ===
(Sweden) Björn Borg defeated (New Zealand) Onny Parun 6–4, 6–3, 6–1

- It was Borg's first singles title of his career.

=== Women's singles ===
(Australia) Evonne Goolagong defeated (United States) Ann Kiyomura 6–3, 6–1

=== Men's doubles ===
(Australia) Syd Ball / (Australia) Bob Giltinan defeated (Australia) Ray Ruffels / (Australia) Allan Stone 6–1, 6–4
