= 1978 Swedish Open =

- Date: 17–23 July
- Edition: 31st
- Category: Grand Prix (Two stars)
- Draw: 32S / 16D
- Prize money: $75,000
- Surface: Clay / outdoor
- Location: Båstad, Sweden

Champions

Singles
- (Sweden) Björn Borg

Doubles
- (Australia) Bob Carmichael / (Australia) Mark Edmondson
- Swedish Open

The 1978 Swedish Open was a men's tennis tournament played on outdoor clay courts held in Båstad, Sweden. It was part of the 1978 Grand Prix circuit. It was the 31st edition of the tournament and was held from 17 July through 23 July 1978. First-seeded Björn Borg won the singles title, his second at the event after 1974.

== Finals ==
=== Singles ===
(Sweden) Björn Borg defeated (Italy) Corrado Barazzutti 6–1, 6–2

- It was Borg's 8th singles title of the year and the 38th of his career.

=== Doubles ===
(Australia) Bob Carmichael / (Australia) Mark Edmondson defeated (Hungary) Péter Szőke / (Hungary) Balázs Taróczy 7–5, 6–4
