= 1976 World Championship Tennis Finals =

- Date: May 4–9
- Edition: 6th
- Category: World Championship Tennis
- Draw: 8S
- Prize money: $100,000
- Surface: Carpet / Indoor
- Location: Dallas, Texas, USA
- Venue: Moody Coliseum

Champions

Singles
- (Sweden) Björn Borg
← 1975 ·	WCT Finals	· 1977 →

The 1976 World Championship Tennis Finals was a tennis tournament played on indoor carpet courts. It was the 6th edition of the WCT Finals and was part of the 1976 World Championship Tennis circuit. It was played at the Moody Coliseum in Dallas, Texas, in the United States and was held from May 4 through May 9, 1976.

== Finals ==
=== Singles ===
(Sweden) Björn Borg defeated (Argentina) Guillermo Vilas 1–6, 6–1, 7–5, 6–1

- It was Borg's 3rd title of the year and the 19th of his career.

== See also ==
- 1976 Commercial Union Assurance Masters
- 1976 WCT World Doubles
