= São Paulo WCT =

Defunct tennis tournament
- Tour: World Championship Tennis
- Founded: 1974
- Abolished: 1976
- Editions: 3
- Location: São Paulo, Brazil
- Surface: Carpet / indoor

The São Paulo WCT was a men's tennis tournament played in São Paulo, Brazil from 1974 to 1976. The event was part of the WCT Tour and was held on indoor carpet courts.

== Past finals ==
=== Singles ===
Year	Champions	Runners-up	Score
1974	(Sweden) Björn Borg	(United States) Arthur Ashe	6–2, 3–6, 6–3
1975	(Australia) Rod Laver	(United States) Charlie Pasarell	6–4, 6–4
1976	(Sweden) Björn Borg	(Argentina) Guillermo Vilas	7–6, 6–2

=== Doubles ===
Year	Champions	Runners-up	Score
1974	(Italy) Adriano Panatta (Romania) Ion Țiriac	(Sweden) Ove Nils Bengtson (Sweden) Björn Borg	7–5, 3–6, 6–3
1975	(Australia) Ross Case (Australia) Geoff Masters	(United States) Brian Gottfried (Mexico) Raúl Ramírez	6–7, 7–6, 7–6
1976	(Australia) Ross Case (Australia) Geoff Masters	(United States) Charlie Pasarell (Australia) Allan Stone	7–5, 6–1

== See also ==
- ATP São Paulo
