= 1980 Volvo Masters – Singles =

Singles
- 1980 Volvo Masters

Final
- Champion: (Sweden) Björn Borg
- Runner-up: (Czechoslovakia) Ivan Lendl
- Score: 6–4, 6–2, 6–2

Details
- Draw: 8

Events
Singles	Doubles
← 1979 ·	ATP Finals	· 1981 →

Defending champion Björn Borg successfully defended his title, defeating Ivan Lendl in the final, 6–4, 6–2, 6–2 to win the singles title at the 1980 Volvo Masters.

== Draw ==
=== Key ===
- Q = Qualifier
- WC = Wild card
- LL = Lucky loser
- Alt = Alternate
- SE = Special exempt
- PR = Protected ranking
- ITF = ITF entry
- JE = Junior exempt
- w/o = Walkover
- r = Retired
- d = Defaulted
- SR = Special ranking

=== Finals ===
Semifinals
(United States) Gene Mayer	3	4
(Czechoslovakia) Ivan Lendl	6	6
(Sweden) Björn Borg	6	6	6
(United States) Jimmy Connors	4	7	3

Final
(Czechoslovakia) Ivan Lendl	4	2	2
(Sweden) Björn Borg	6	6	6

=== Group A ===
	(United States) Mayer	(United States) McEnroe	(Argentina) Clerc	(Sweden) Borg	RR; W–L	Set; W–L	Game; W–L	Standings
(United States) Gene Mayer		3–6, 7–6, 6–2	6–3, 7–5	6–0, 6–3	3–0	6–1	41–25	1
(United States) John McEnroe	6–3, 6–7, 2–6		3–6, 0–6	4–6, 7–6, 6–7	0–3	2–6	34–47	4
(Argentina) José Luis Clerc	3–6, 5–7	6–3, 6–0		3–6, 4–6	1–2	2–4	27–28	3
(Sweden) Björn Borg	0–6, 3–6	6–4, 6–7, 7–6	6–3, 6–4		2–1	4–3	34–36	2

Standings are determined by: 1. number of wins; 2. number of matches; 3. in two-players-ties, head-to-head records; 4. in three-players-ties, percentage of sets won, or of games won; 5. steering-committee decision.

=== Group B ===
	(United States) Connors	(Argentina) Vilas	(United States) Solomon	(Czechoslovakia) Ivan Lendl	RR; W–L	Set; W–L	Game; W–L	Standings
(United States) Jimmy Connors		6–2, 4–6, 6–0	6–2, 6–4	7–6, 6–1	3–0	6–1	41–21	1
(Argentina) Guillermo Vilas	2–6, 6–4, 0–6		5–7, 7–6, 7–5	5–7, 4–6	1–2	3–5	36–47	3
(United States) Harold Solomon	2–6, 4–6	7–5, 6–7, 5–7		3–6, 1–6	0–3	1–6	28–43	4
(Czechoslovakia) Ivan Lendl	6–7, 1–6	7–5, 6–4	6–3, 6–1		2–1	4–2	32–26	2

Standings are determined by: 1. number of wins; 2. number of matches; 3. in two-players-ties, head-to-head records; 4. in three-players-ties, percentage of sets won, or of games won; 5. steering-committee decision.

== See also ==
- ATP World Tour Finals appearances
