= 1979 Colgate-Palmolive Masters – Singles =

Tennis tournament

Singles
- 1979 Colgate-Palmolive Masters

Final
- Champion: (Sweden) Björn Borg
- Runner-up: (United States) Vitas Gerulaitis
- Score: 6–2, 6–2

Details
- Draw: 8S

Events
Singles	Doubles
← 1978 ·	ATP Finals	· 1980 →

Björn Borg defeated Vitas Gerulaitis in the final, 6–2, 6–2 to win the singles title at the 1979 Colgate-Palmolive Masters.

John McEnroe was the defending champion, but lost to Borg in the semifinals.

== Draw ==
=== Key ===
- Q = Qualifier
- WC = Wild card
- LL = Lucky loser
- Alt = Alternate
- SE = Special exempt
- PR = Protected ranking
- ITF = ITF entry
- JE = Junior exempt
- w/o = Walkover
- r = Retired
- d = Defaulted
- SR = Special ranking

=== Finals ===
Semifinals
(United States) Vitas Gerulaitis	7	6
(United States) Jimmy Connors	5	2
(Sweden) Björn Borg	6	6	7
(United States) John McEnroe	7	3	6

Final
(United States) Vitas Gerulaitis	2	2
(Sweden) Björn Borg	6	6

=== Group A ===
	(United States) Gerulaitis	(United States) Solomon	(United States) McEnroe	(Argentina) Vilas	RR; W–L	Set; W–L	Game; W–L	Standings
(United States) Vitas Gerulaitis		6–1, 7–6	3–6, 7–6, 7–6	4–6, 7–6, 3–6	2–1	5–3	44–43	1
(United States) Harold Solomon	1–6, 6–7		3–6, 5–7	6–2, 6–2	1–2	2–4	27–30	3
(United States) John McEnroe	6–3, 6–7, 6–7	6–3, 7–5		6–2, 6–3	2–1	5–2	43–30	2
(Argentina) Guillermo Vilas	6–4, 6–7, 6–3	2–6, 2–6	2–6, 3–6		1–2	2–5	27–38	4

Standings are determined by: 1. number of wins; 2. number of matches; 3. in two-players-ties, head-to-head records; 4. in three-players-ties, percentage of sets won, or of games won; 5. steering-committee decision.

=== Group B ===
	(Sweden) Borg	(United States) Tanner	(United States) Jimmy Connors	(Spain) Higueras	RR; W–L	Set; W–L	Game; W–L	Standings
(Sweden) Björn Borg		6–3, 6–3	3–6 6–3, 7–6	6–2, 6–0	3–0	6–1	40–23	1
(United States) Roscoe Tanner	3–6, 3–6		6–2, 4–6, 6–7	7–5, 6–4	1–2	3–4	35–36	3
(United States) Jimmy Connors	6–3, 3–6, 6–7	2–6, 6–4, 7–6		6–3, 6–0	2–1	5–3	42–35	2
(Spain) José Higueras	2–6, 0–6	5–7, 4–6	3–6, 0–6		0–3	0–6	14–37	4

Standings are determined by: 1. number of wins; 2. number of matches; 3. in two-players-ties, head-to-head records; 4. in three-players-ties, percentage of sets won, or of games won; 5. steering-committee decision.

== See also ==
- ATP World Tour Finals appearances
