= John Lloyd (tennis) =

Tennis player and TV commentator

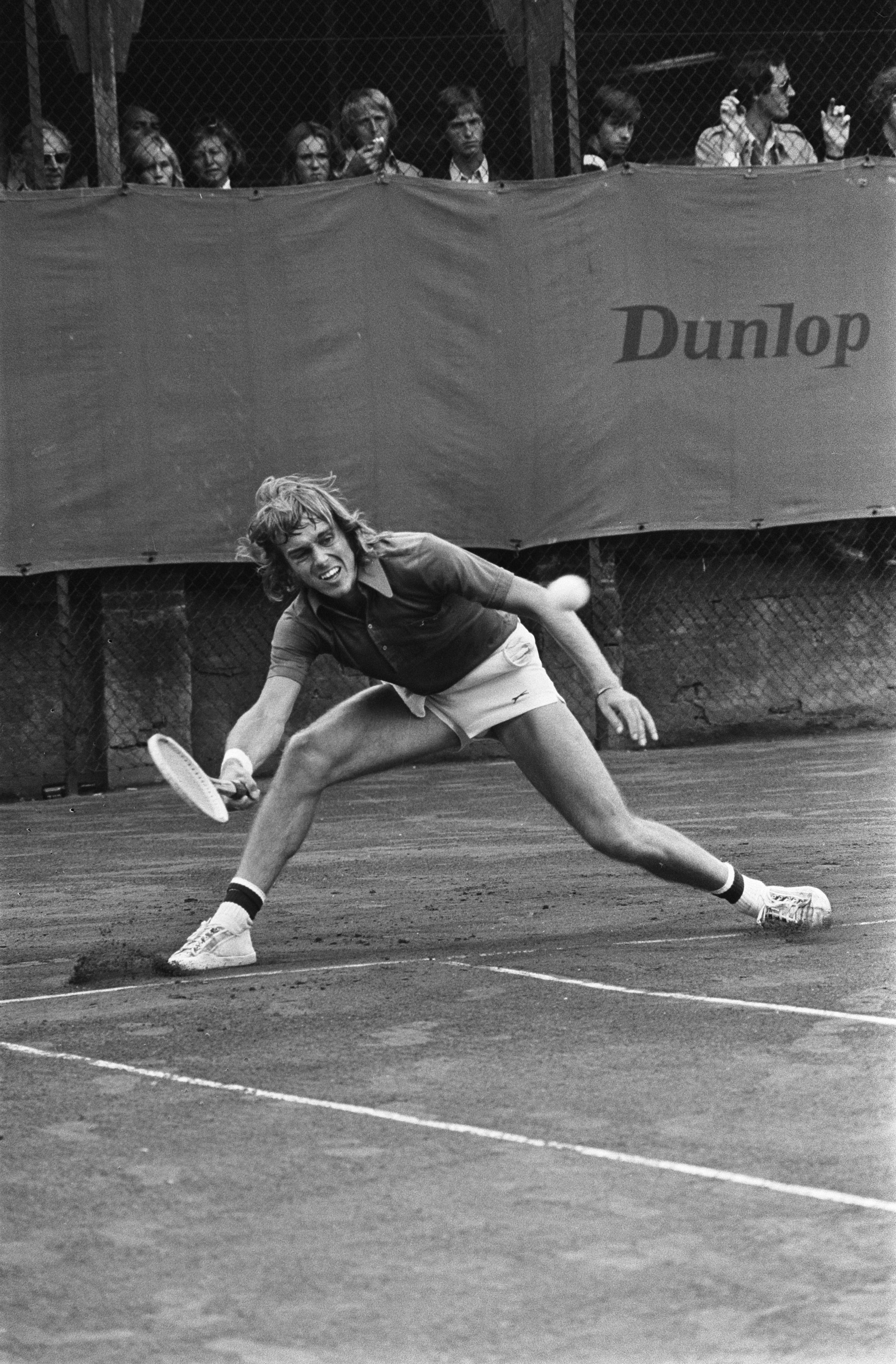
- Lloyd at the Dutch Open in 1975
- Country (sports): United Kingdom
- Residence: Palm Beach, Florida
- Born: 27 August 1954 (age 71) Leigh-on-Sea, Essex, England
- Height: 5 ft 11 in (1.80 m)
- Plays: Right-handed (one-handed backhand)
- Prize money: $598,092

Singles
- Career record: 210–259 (44.8%)
- Career titles: 1
- Highest ranking: No. 23 (23 July 1978)

Grand Slam singles results
- Australian Open: F (1977^{Dec})
- French Open: 3R (1978, 1982)
- Wimbledon: 3R (1973, 1984, 1985)
- US Open: QF (1984)

Doubles
- Career record: 206–239 (46.3%)
- Career titles: 2
- Highest ranking: No. 34 (8 September 1986)

Grand Slam doubles results
- Australian Open: 3R (1984, 1985)
- French Open: QF (1986)
- Wimbledon: QF (1982)
- US Open: QF (1984)

Mixed doubles
- Career titles: 3

Grand Slam mixed doubles results
- Australian Open: 1R (1989)
- French Open: W (1982)
- Wimbledon: W (1983, 1984)

John Lloyd (born 27 August 1954) is a British former professional tennis player. Lloyd reached an ATP world ranking of 23 in July 1978, and was ranked as UK number 1 in 1984 and 1985. He now works as a tennis commentator.

During his career, he reached one Grand Slam singles final – losing to Vitas Gerulaitis in the 1977 Australian Open. Lloyd won three Grand Slam mixed doubles titles with tennis partner Wendy Turnbull: the French Open in 1982 and Wimbledon in 1983 and 1984. Lloyd was a member of the Great Britain team that reached the final of the 1978 Davis Cup, losing to the United States.

He was the first husband of the former top female player Chris Evert and is the younger brother of the former British Davis Cup captain David Lloyd. He served as the British Davis Cup captain himself from August 2006 until March 2010. He is a member of the All England Lawn Tennis and Croquet Club.

== Education ==
Lloyd was educated initially at Chalkwell Hall (Juniors) and at Southend High School for Boys, a state grammar school in Southend-on-Sea in Essex, in southeast England.

== Life and career ==
At the Australian Open in December 1977, Lloyd became the first British male tennis player in the Open era to reach a Grand Slam singles final. He lost in five sets to America's Vitas Gerulaitis. No other British player reached a Grand Slam final for 20 years, until British-Canadian Greg Rusedski reached the US Open final in 1997. In 1984 he reached the quarter-finals of the US Open. Lloyd never progressed beyond the third round in singles play at Wimbledon.

Though he did not win a Grand Slam singles title, Lloyd won three Grand Slam mixed doubles titles partnering Australia's Wendy Turnbull, beginning with the French Open mixed doubles in 1982. The pair finished runners-up in the mixed doubles at Wimbledon that year, and then went on to win the Wimbledon mixed doubles crown in both 1983 and 1984.

Lloyd's career-high singles ranking was World No. 23 in 1978. He was a member of the British team that reached the final of the Davis Cup that year with Lloyd himself losing in straight sets in the singles to Brian Gottfried and to a 19-year-old John McEnroe. As a player, he represented the British Davis Cup team for 11 years. His career-high doubles ranking was World No. 34 in 1986. As his playing career came to an end, Lloyd stayed within the tennis world, finding work as a coach and television commentator, and appearing on the veterans circuit.

In 2006, Lloyd was appointed the captain of Great Britain's Davis Cup team, replacing Jeremy Bates. Lloyd's reign started very well, with successive victories taking the team back into the World Group, but after the retirement of both Greg Rusedski and Tim Henman in 2007 the team suffered five successive defeats, their worst run in Davis Cup history, to drop back down to the third tier of the competition. Lloyd resigned as coach in mid-2010.

== Commentator ==
Since the 1990s, Lloyd has been a commentator and analyst for the BBC's tennis coverage, particularly at Wimbledon. Lloyd is known for his catchphrases, using the analogy of food and drink to describe tennis shots. For example, if a shot is too weak he will claim that it was "undercooked" or "needed more mustard." Conversely, if a shot is overhit he will describe it as "overcooked", having "too much juice", or "having too much mustard."

He worked for Sky Sports on their coverage of the 2009 US Open.

== Personal life ==
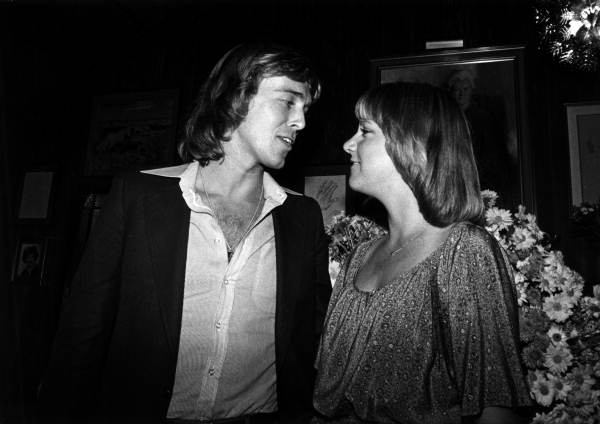
John Lloyd and Chris Evert in Fort Lauderdale c. 1978

In 1979, Lloyd married the World No. 1 female player, American Chris Evert (who became Chris Evert-Lloyd). The media-styled "golden couple" of tennis enjoyed several years in the limelight before a separation, a short-lived reconciliation, and eventual divorce in 1987. Because of Evert's higher profile tennis career, Lloyd was sometimes jokingly referred to in the press as "Mr. Evert". Aware of this negative impact on his psyche, Evert attempted to boost Lloyd's standing by the couple always insisting on being billed or announced as "International tennis star John Lloyd and his wife Chris" whenever they made personal appearances together in the UK or Australia. Their biographer Carol Thatcher (a friend of the couple) observed that this was akin to the ridiculousness of her own parents being announced as "International business executive Denis Thatcher and his wife Margaret".

In 1987, Lloyd married Deborah Taylor-Bellman, an American dancing teacher, their marriage lasting 30 years, until 2017. They have two children. Lloyd has recounted how getting a divorce may have unintentionally helped save his life; since upon moving to Florida in the U.S. following his divorce, he was diagnosed with prostate cancer, which then could be treated in time. Lloyd currently lives in Palm Beach, Florida, with his girlfriend Svetlana Carroll, a Russian-born estate agent.

Lloyd is a supporter of the football team Wolverhampton Wanderers. It is because of Lloyd's influence that Andy Murray is also a Wolves fan (although Murray's 'first' club is Hibernian FC) and has often been seen wearing the Wolves shirt that was presented to him by Lloyd.

== Grand Slam finals ==
=== Singles (1 runner-up) ===
Result	Year	Championship	Surface	Opponent	Score
Loss	1977^{D}	Australian Open	Grass	(United States) Vitas Gerulaitis	3–6, 6–7^{(4–7)}, 7–5, 6–3, 2–6

=== Mixed doubles (3 titles, 1 runner-up) ===
Result	Year	Championship	Surface	Partner	Opponents	Score
Win	1982	French Open	Clay	(Australia) Wendy Turnbull	(Brazil) Cláudia Monteiro (Brazil) Cássio Motta	6–2, 7–6
Loss	1982	Wimbledon	Grass	(Australia) Wendy Turnbull	(United States) Anne Smith (South Africa) Kevin Curren	6–2, 3–6, 5–7
Win	1983	Wimbledon	Grass	(Australia) Wendy Turnbull	(United States) Billie Jean King (United States) Steve Denton	6–7^{(5–7)}, 7–6^{(7–5)}, 7–5
Win	1984	Wimbledon (2)	Grass	(Australia) Wendy Turnbull	(United States) Kathy Jordan (United States) Steve Denton	6–3, 6–3

== Grand Slam tournament performance timeline ==
Key
W	F	SF	QF	#R	RR	Q#	DNQ	A	NH

(W) winner; (F) finalist; (SF) semifinalist; (QF) quarterfinalist; (#R) rounds 4, 3, 2, 1; (RR) round-robin stage; (Q#) qualification round; (DNQ) did not qualify; (A) absent; (NH) not held; (SR) strike rate (events won / competed); (W–L) win–loss record.

=== Singles ===
Tournament	1971	1972	1973	1974	1975	1976	1977		1978	1979	1980	1981	1982	1983	1984	1985	1986	SR
Australian Open	A	A	A	2R	A	2R	A	F	A	A	A	Q1	1R	4R	2R	QF	NH	0 / 7
French Open	A	Q3	2R	1R	2R	1R	1R		3R	2R	A	A	3R	1R	2R	2R	1R	0 / 12
Wimbledon	Q1	Q2	3R	1R	1R	1R	2R		1R	1R	1R	2R	1R	1R	3R	3R	1R	0 / 14
US Open	A	A	2R	2R	2R	3R	2R		3R	3R	A	1R	A	4R	QF	2R	A	0 / 11
Strike rate	0 / 0	0 / 0	0 / 3	0 / 4	0 / 3	0 / 4	0 / 4		0 / 3	0 / 3	0 / 1	0 / 2	0 / 3	0 / 4	0 / 4	0 / 4	0 / 2	0 / 44

Note: The Australian Open was held twice in 1977, in January and December.

== Career finals ==
=== Singles: 5 (1 title, 4 runners-up) ===
Result	W-L	Date	Tournament	Surface	Opponent	Score
Win	1–0	Aug 1974	Haverford, U.S.	Grass	(United States) John Whitlinger	6–0, 4–6, 6–3, 7–5
Loss	1–1	Oct 1977	Basel, Switzerland	Hard (i)	(Sweden) Björn Borg	4–6, 2–6, 3–6
Loss	1–2	Nov 1977	Wembley, UK	Carpet (i)	(Sweden) Björn Borg	4–6, 4–6, 3–6
Loss	1–3	Dec 1977	Australian Open	Grass	(United States) Vitas Gerulaitis	3–6, 6–7, 7–5, 6–3, 2–6
Loss	1–4	Aug 1979	South Orange, U.S.	Clay	(United States) John McEnroe	7–6^{(7–1)}, 4–6, 0–6

=== Doubles: 10 (2 titles, 8 runners-up) ===
Result	W-L	Date	Tournament	Surface	Partner	Opponents	Score
Loss	0–1	Feb 1974	London, UK	Hard	(United Kingdom) Mark Farrell	(Sweden) Ove Nils Bengtson (Sweden) Björn Borg	6–7, 3–6
Loss	0–2	Jul 1975	Hilversum, Netherlands	Clay	(Socialist Federal Republic of Yugoslavia) Željko Franulović	(Poland) Wojciech Fibak (Argentina) Guillermo Vilas	4–6, 3–6
Loss	0–3	Aug 1975	South Orange, U.S.	Clay	(Australia) Dick Crealy	(United States) Jimmy Connors (Romania) Ilie Năstase	2–6, 3–6
Win	1–3	Nov 1976	London, UK	Carpet (i)	(United Kingdom) David Lloyd	(United Kingdom) John Feaver (Australia) John James	6–4, 3–6, 6–2
Loss	1–4	Mar 1977	Helsinki, Finland	Carpet (i)	(United Kingdom) David Lloyd	(Czechoslovakia) Jiří Hřebec (Austria) Hans Kary	7–5, 6–7, 4–6
Loss	1–5	Jun 1977	Queen's Club, London, UK	Grass	(United Kingdom) David Lloyd	(India) Anand Amritraj (India) Vijay Amritraj	1–6, 2–6
Win	2–5	Oct 1979	Maui, U.S.	Hard	(United States) Nick Saviano	(Australia) Rod Frawley (Paraguay) Francisco González	7–5, 6–4
Loss	2–6	Nov 1979	Paris, France	Hard	(United Kingdom) Tony Lloyd	(France) Jean-Louis Haillet (France) Gilles Moretton	6–7, 6–7
Loss	2–7	Feb 1982	La Quinta, U.S.	Hard	(United States) Dick Stockton	(United States) Brian Gottfried (Mexico) Raúl Ramírez	4–6, 6–3, 2–6
Loss	2–8	Jul 1983	South Orange, U.S.	Clay	(United States) Dick Stockton	(United States) Fritz Buehning (United States) Tom Cain	2–6, 5–7
