= 1979 Swedish Open =

- Date: 16–22 July
- Edition: 32nd
- Category: Grand Prix
- Draw: 32S / 16D
- Prize money: $75,000
- Surface: Clay / outdoor
- Location: Båstad, Sweden

Champions

Singles
- (Sweden) Björn Borg

Doubles
- (Switzerland) Heinz Günthardt / (South Africa) Bob Hewitt
- Swedish Open

The 1979 Swedish Open was a men's professional tennis tournament played on outdoor clay courts and held in Båstad, Sweden. It was part of the 1979 Grand Prix circuit. It was the 32nd edition of the tournament and was held from 16 July through 22 July 1979. Björn Borg won the singles title.

== Finals ==
=== Singles ===
(Sweden) Björn Borg defeated (Hungary) Balázs Taróczy 6–1, 7–5

- It was Borg's 8th singles title of the year and the 47th of his career.

=== Doubles ===
(Switzerland) Heinz Günthardt / (South Africa) Bob Hewitt defeated (Australia) Mark Edmondson / (Australia) John Marks 6–2, 6–2
