= 1976 World Championship Tennis Finals – Singles =

Singles
- 1976 World Championship Tennis Finals

Final
- Champion: (Sweden) Björn Borg
- Runner-up: (Argentina) Guillermo Vilas
- Score: 1–6, 6–1, 7–5, 6–1

Events
Singles
- World Championship Tennis Finals

Arthur Ashe was the defending champion but lost in the quarterfinals to Harold Solomon.

Björn Borg won in the final 1–6, 6–1, 7–5, 6–1 against Guillermo Vilas.

== Seeds ==
A champion seed is indicated in bold text while text in italics indicates the round in which that seed was eliminated.

1. (United States) Arthur Ashe (quarterfinals)
2. (Argentina) Guillermo Vilas (final)
3. (Sweden) **Björn Borg (champion)**
4. (Mexico) Raúl Ramirez (quarterfinals)
5. (United States) Dick Stockton (semifinals)
6. (United States) Eddie Dibbs (quarterfinals)
7. (United States) Harold Solomon (quarterfinals)
8. (United States) Robert Lutz (semifinals)

== Draw ==
Key

- Q = Qualifier
- WC = Wild card
- LL = Lucky loser
- Alt = Alternate
- ITF = ITF entry
- PR = Protected ranking
- SR = Special ranking
- SE = Special exempt
- JE = Junior exempt
- JR = Junior Accelerator Programme entrant
- CO = College Accelerator Programme entrant
- NG = Next Gen Accelerator Program entrant
- w/o = Walkover
- r = Retired
- d = Defaulted

Quarterfinals
1	(United States) Arthur Ashe	5	**6**	1	3
7	(United States) **Harold Solomon**	**7**	3	**6**	**6**
3	(Sweden) **Björn Borg**	3	**6**	**6**	**6**
6	(United States) Eddie Dibbs	**6**	3	4	2
5	(United States) **Dick Stockton**	**6**	**7**	**7**
4	(Mexico) Raúl Ramirez	3	6	6
8	(United States) Robert Lutz	**7**	1	1	2
2	(Argentina) **Guillermo Vilas**	5	**6**	**6**	**6**

Semifinals
7	(United States) Harold Solomon	5	0	3
3	(Sweden) **Björn Borg**	**7**	**6**	**6**
5	(United States) Dick Stockton	5	4	1
2	(Argentina) **Guillermo Vilas**	**7**	**6**	**6**

Final
3	(Sweden) **Björn Borg**	1	**6**	**7**	**6**
2	(Argentina) Guillermo Vilas	**6**	1	5	1
