= 1977 Swedish Open =

- Date: 3–10 July
- Edition: 30th
- Category: Grand Prix (Two star)
- Draw: 32S / 16D
- Prize money: $75,000
- Surface: Clay / outdoor
- Location: Båstad, Sweden

Champions

Singles
- (Italy) Corrado Barazzutti

Doubles
- (Australia) Mark Edmondson / (Australia) John Marks
← 1976 ·	Swedish Open	· 1978 →

The 1977 Swedish Open was a men's tennis tournament played on outdoor clay courts held in Båstad, Sweden. It was a Two Star category tournament and part of the Grand Prix circuit. It was the 30th edition of the tournament and was held from 3 July through 10 July 1977. Second-seeded Corrado Barazzutti won the singles title.

== Finals ==
=== Singles ===
(Italy) Corrado Barazzutti defeated (Hungary) Balázs Taróczy 7–6, 6–7, 6–2

- It was Barazzutti's 2nd singles title of the year and the 3rd of his career.

=== Doubles ===
(Australia) Mark Edmondson / (Australia) John Marks defeated (France) Jean-Louis Haillet / (France) François Jauffret 6–4, 6–0
