= Björn Borg =

Swedish tennis player (born 1956)

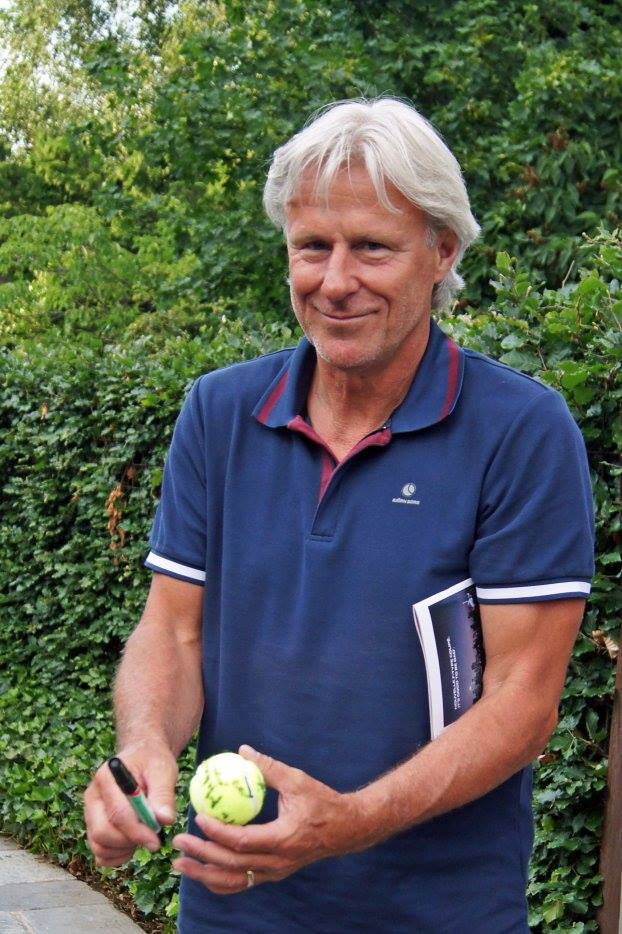
- Borg in 2014
- Full name: Björn Rune Borg
- Country (sports): Sweden
- Residence: Norrmalm, Stockholm, Sweden
- Born: 6 June 1956 (age 70) Stockholm, Sweden
- Height: 1.80 m (5 ft 11 in)
- Turned pro: 1973 (comeback in 1991)
- Retired: 1983, 1993
- Plays: Right-handed (two-handed backhand)
- Coach: Lennart Bergelin (1971–1983); Ron Thatcher (1991–1993)
- Prize money: US$3,655,751
- Int. Tennis HoF: 1987 (member page)

Singles
- Career record: 654–140 (82.4%)
- Career titles: 66 (8th in the Open Era)
- Highest ranking: No. 1 (23 August 1977)

Grand Slam singles results
- Australian Open: 3R (1974)
- French Open: W (1974, 1975, 1978, 1979, 1980, 1981)
- Wimbledon: W (1976, 1977, 1978, 1979, 1980)
- US Open: F (1976, 1978, 1980, 1981)

Other tournaments
- Tour Finals: W (1979, 1980)
- WCT Finals: W (1976)
- Professional majors
- US Pro: W (1974, 1975, 1976)
- Wembley Pro: W (1977)

Doubles
- Career record: 86–81 (51.2%)
- Career titles: 4

Grand Slam doubles results
- Australian Open: 3R (1973)
- French Open: SF (1974, 1975)
- Wimbledon: 3R (1976)
- US Open: 3R (1975)

Team competitions
- Davis Cup: W (1975)

Björn Rune Borg (Swedish: [ˈbjœːɳ ˈbɔrj]; born 6 June 1956) is a Swedish former professional tennis player. He was ranked as the world No. 1 in men's singles by the Association of Tennis Professionals (ATP) for 109 weeks. Borg won 66 singles titles during his career, including eleven majors: six at the French Open and five consecutively at Wimbledon. Borg was ATP Player of the Year from 1976 to 1980, the year-end No. 1 in the ATP rankings in 1979 and 1980, and the ITF World Champion from 1978 to 1980.

A teenage sensation at the start of his career, Borg experienced unprecedented stardom and consistent success that helped propel the rising popularity of tennis during the 1970s. Between 1974 and 1981, Borg claimed 11 major singles titles, the most by any man in the Open Era up to that point. His rivalries with Jimmy Connors and John McEnroe became cultural touchstones beyond the world of tennis, with the latter rivalry peaking at the 1980 Wimbledon final, considered one of the greatest matches ever played. Following defeats to McEnroe in the 1981 Wimbledon and US Open finals, Borg unexpectedly retired from tennis at the age of 25. He made a brief and unsuccessful comeback in 1991.

Borg won four consecutive French Open titles (1978–81) and was undefeated in six French Open finals. He is the only man to achieve the Channel Slam three times. He won three major titles without losing a set during those tournaments. However, he never won the US Open despite four runner-up finishes. Borg also won three year-end championships and 16 Grand Prix Super Series titles. In 1979, Borg became the first player to earn more than US$1 million in prize money in a single season. Overall, he set numerous records, some of which still stand.

Borg is widely considered one of the all-time greats of the sport, and was ranked by Tennis magazine as the sixth-greatest male player of the Open Era.

== Early life ==
Björn Borg was born in Stockholm, Sweden, on 6 June 1956, the only child of Rune (1932–2008), an electrician, and Margaretha Borg (b. 1934). He grew up in nearby Södertälje. As a child, Borg became fascinated with a golden tennis racket that his father won at a table-tennis tournament. His father gave him the racket, beginning his tennis career.

A player of great athleticism and endurance, he had a distinctive style and appearance—bowlegged and very fast. His muscularity allowed him to put heavy topspin on both his forehand and two-handed backhand. He followed Jimmy Connors in using the two-handed backhand. By the time he was 13, he was beating the best of Sweden's under-18 players, and Davis Cup captain Lennart Bergelin (who served as Borg's primary coach throughout his professional career) cautioned against anyone trying to change Borg's rough-looking, jerky strokes.

== Career ==
=== 1972–73 – Davis Cup debut and first year on the tour ===
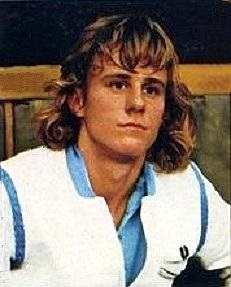
Borg in 1974

At the age of 15, Borg represented Sweden in the 1972 Davis Cup and won his debut singles rubber in five sets against Onny Parun of New Zealand. Later that year, he won the Wimbledon junior singles title, recovering from a 5–2 deficit in the final set to overcome Britain's Buster Mottram. Then in December, he won the Orange Bowl Junior Championship for boys 18 and under after a straight-sets victory in the final over Vitas Gerulaitis. Borg joined the professional circuit in 1973, and reached his first singles final in April at the Monte Carlo Open, which he lost to Ilie Năstase. He was unseeded at his first French Open and reached the fourth round where he lost in four sets to eighth-seeded Adriano Panatta. Borg was seeded sixth at his first Wimbledon Championships, in large part due to a boycott by the ATP, and reached the quarterfinal, where he was defeated in a five-set match by Roger Taylor. In the second half of 1973, he was runner-up in San Francisco, Stockholm and Buenos Aires and finished the year ranked No. 18.

=== 1974 – First French Open title ===
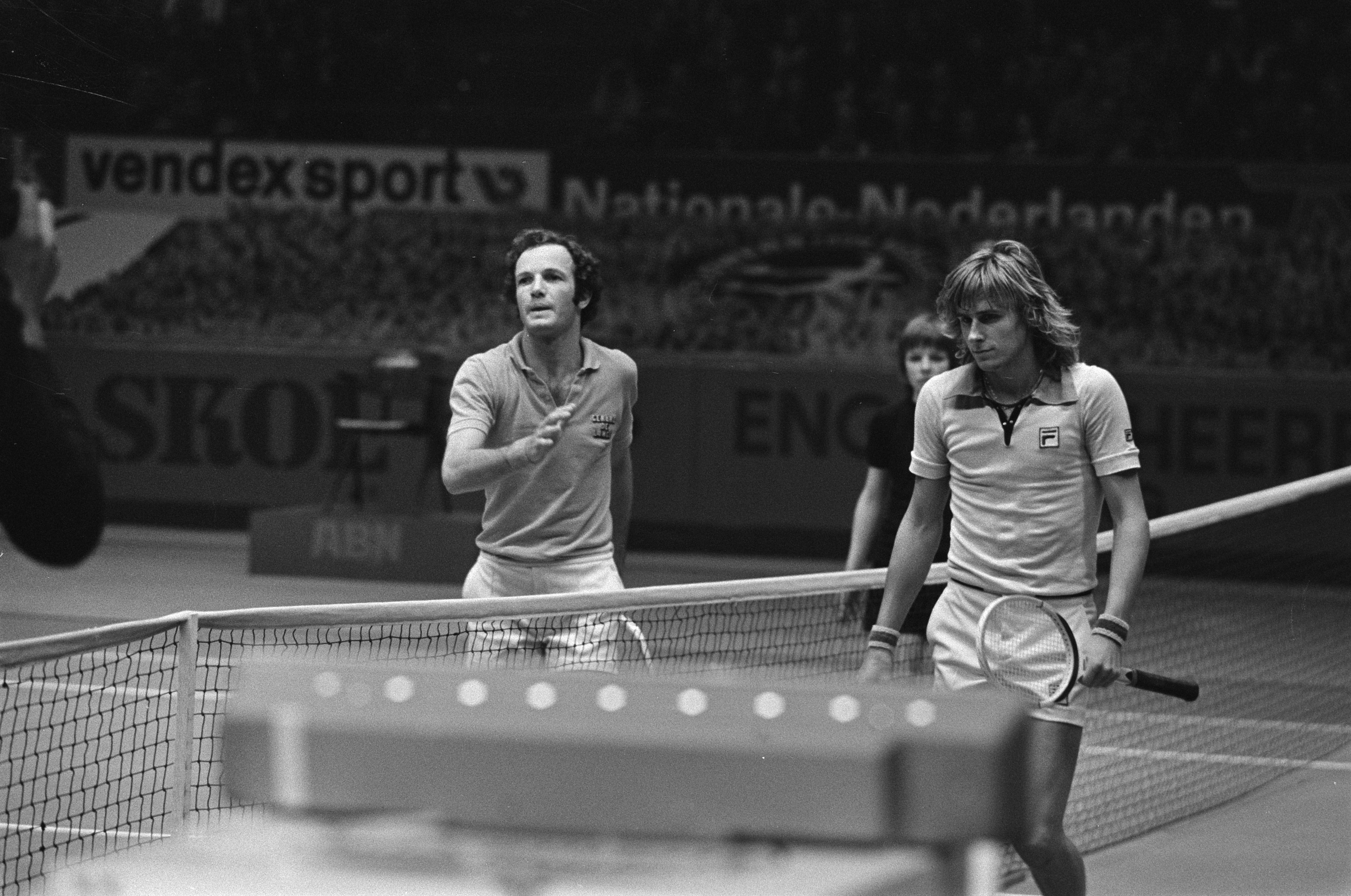
Borg (right) playing Tom Okker at Rotterdam Open in 1975

Borg made his only appearance at the Australian Open at the age of 17, and reached the third round, where he lost in straight sets to the eventual finalist Phil Dent. In January, he won his first career singles title at the New Zealand Open, followed by titles in London and São Paulo in February and March respectively. Just before his 18th birthday in June 1974, Borg won his first top-level singles title at the Italian Open, defeating defending champion and top-seeded Ilie Năstase in the final and becoming its youngest winner. Two weeks later, he won the singles title at the French Open, his first Grand Slam tournament title, defeating Manuel Orantes in the final in five sets. Barely 18, Borg was the youngest-ever male French Open champion up to that point. At Wimbledon, Borg lost in the third round to Ismael El Shafei in straight sets in a match in which "Borg quit trying mid-way through the second set". At the US Open, Borg lost in the second round to Vijay Amritraj in five sets which was "one of the memorable matches on the famed center court- a duel of strategy and stroke making".

=== 1975 – Retained French Open title ===
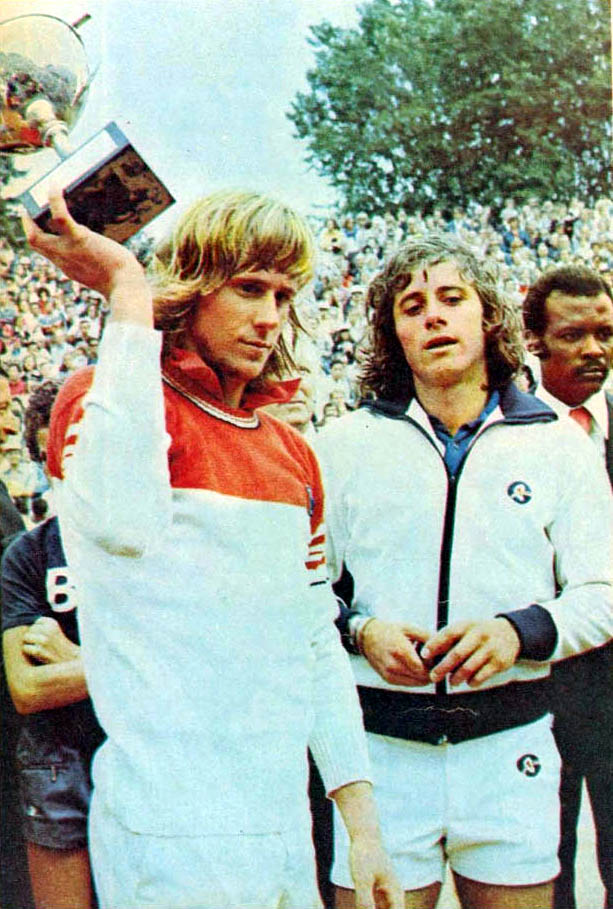
Borg (left) celebrating his win over Guillermo Vilas at the French Open final in 1975

In early 1975, Borg defeated Rod Laver, then 36 years old, in a semifinal of the World Championship Tennis (WCT) finals in Dallas, Texas, in five sets. Borg subsequently lost to Arthur Ashe in the final. Borg retained his French Open title in 1975, beating Guillermo Vilas in the final in straight sets. Borg then reached the Wimbledon quarterfinals, where he lost to eventual champion Ashe. Borg did not lose another match at Wimbledon until 1981. Borg lost in the semi-finals of the US Open on clay in straight sets to Connors. Connors' "tremendous power when he found himself behind, blunted the 19-year-old Swede's topspin and balloon ball hitting". Borg won two singles and one doubles rubber in the 1975 Davis Cup final, as Sweden beat Czechoslovakia 3–2. With these singles wins, Borg had won 19 consecutive Davis Cup singles rubbers since 1973. That was already a record at the time. However, Borg never lost another Davis Cup singles rubber, and, by the end of his career, he had stretched that winning streak to 33.

=== 1976 – First Wimbledon title ===
In early 1976, Borg won the World Championship Tennis year-end WCT Finals in Dallas, Texas, with a four-set victory over Guillermo Vilas in the final. At the 1976 French Open, Borg lost to the Italian Adriano Panatta, who remains the only player to defeat Borg at this tournament. Panatta did it twice: in the fourth round in 1973, and in the 1976 quarterfinals. Borg won Wimbledon in 1976 without losing a set, defeating the favored Ilie Năstase in the final. Borg became the youngest male Wimbledon singles champion since Sidney Wood in 1931 at 20 years and 1 month (a record subsequently broken by Boris Becker, who won Wimbledon aged 17 in 1985). Năstase later said, "We're playing tennis and he's playing something else." Borg also reached the final of the 1976 U.S. Open, which was then being played on clay courts. Borg lost in four sets to world no. 1 Jimmy Connors. Borg was awarded the ATP Player of the Year award and ranked world No. 1 by Tennis Magazine (France).

=== 1977 – Second Wimbledon title and world No.1 ranking ===
In February 1977 World Championship Tennis (WCT) sued Borg and his management company IMG claiming that Borg had committed a breach of contract by electing to participate in the competing 1977 Grand Prix circuit instead of the WCT circuit. Borg eventually played, and won, a single WCT event, the Monte Carlo WCT. An out-of-court settlement was reached whereby Borg committed to play six or eight WCT events in 1978 which were then part of the Grand Prix circuit.

Borg skipped the French Open in 1977 because he was under contract with WTT, but he repeated his Wimbledon triumph, although this time he was pushed much harder. He defeated his good friend Vitas Gerulaitis in a semifinal in five sets. His match with Gerulaitis was deemed by Wimbledon itself as "probably the greatest gentlemen's singles match played at Wimbledon". In the 1977 final Borg was pushed to five sets for the third time in the tournament, this time by Connors. The win propelled Borg to the No. 1 ranking in the ATP point system, albeit for just one week in August. Before the 1977 US Open, Borg aggravated a shoulder injury while waterskiing with Vitas Gerulaitis. This injury ultimately forced him to retire from the Open during a Round of 16 match vs Dick Stockton. Borg was rated number one for 1977 by Tennis Magazine (France), Tennis Magazine (U.S.), Barry Lorge, Lance Tingay, Rino Tommasi, Judith Elian and Rod Laver. Borg was also named "ATP Player of the Year". Through 1977, he had never lost to a player younger than himself.

=== 1978 – French and Wimbledon titles ===
Borg was at the height of his career from 1978 through 1980, completing the French Open-Wimbledon double all three years. In 1978, Borg won the French Open with a win over Vilas in the final. Borg did not drop a set during the tournament, a feat only he, Năstase (in 1973), and Rafael Nadal (in 2008, 2010, 2017, and 2020) have accomplished at the French Open during the open era. In round one of Wimbledon Borg was 2 sets to 1 down, 3–1 down, and 30–40 on his serve, one point from going a double break down against the big serving 6 feet 7 inches tall Victor Amaya. Borg came back to win in five sets. Borg beat Connors in straight sets in the final. At the 1978 US Open, now held on hard courts in Flushing Meadows, New York, he lost the final in straight sets to Connors. Borg was suffering from a bad blister on his thumb that required pre-match injections. That autumn, Borg faced John McEnroe for the first time in a semifinal of the Stockholm Open, and lost. Borg was named ATP Player of the Year and was the first ITF World Champion.

=== 1979 – French and Wimbledon titles and year-end No. 1 ranking ===
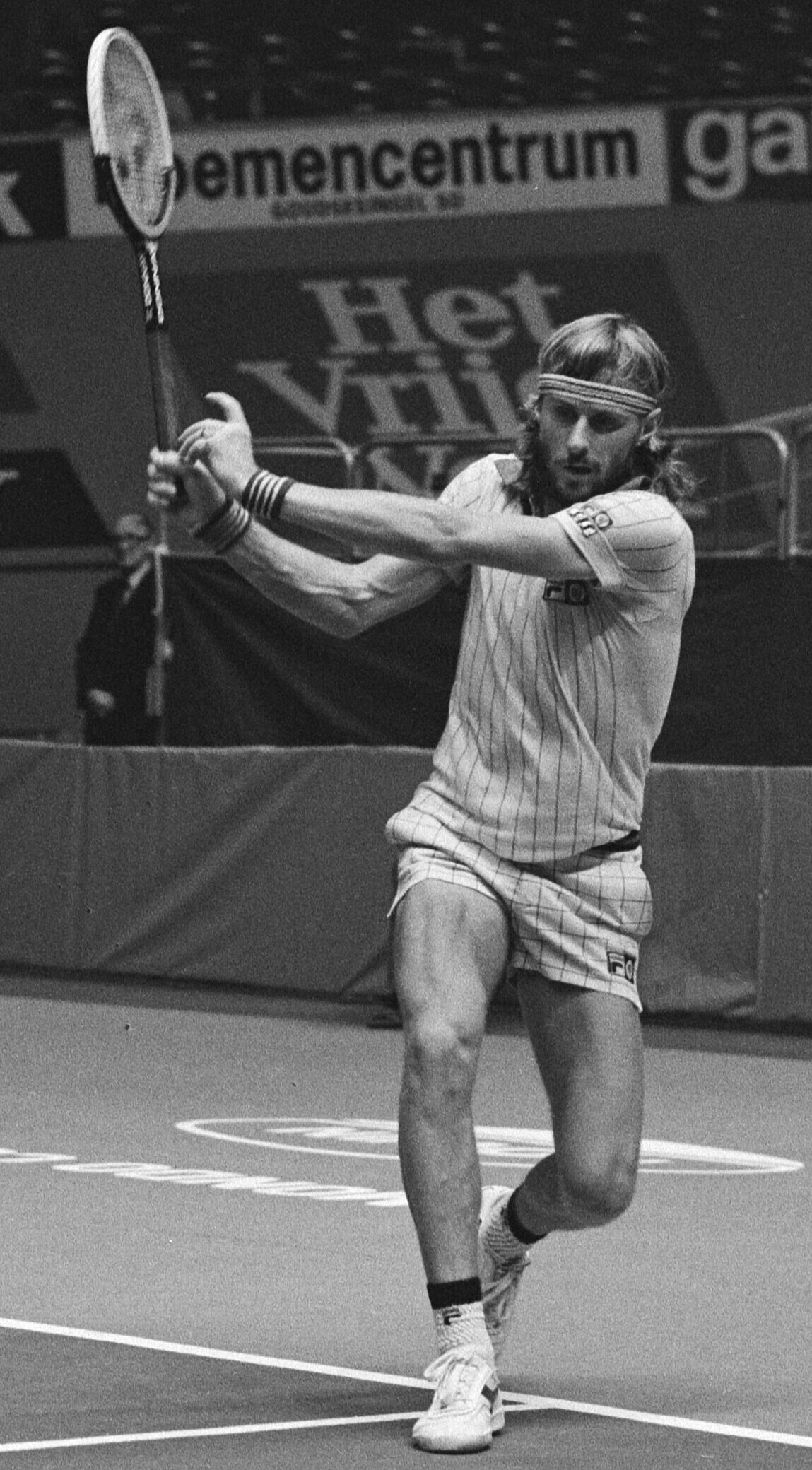
Borg playing a double-handed backhand shot at the 1979 ABN World Tennis Tournament

Borg lost to McEnroe again in four sets in the final of the 1979 WCT Finals, but was now overtaking Connors for the top ranking. Borg established himself in the top spot with his fourth French Open singles title and fourth straight Wimbledon singles title, defeating Connors in a straight-set semifinal at the latter tournament. At the 1979 French Open, Borg defeated big-serving Víctor Pecci in a four-set final. In the 1979 Wimbledon final Borg came from behind to overcome an even bigger server, Roscoe Tanner in five sets, admitting afterwards that "at the end of the match I have never been so nervous in my whole life". Borg was upset by Tanner at the US Open, in a four-set quarterfinal played under lights. At the season-ending Masters tournament in January 1980, Borg survived a close semifinal against McEnroe. He then beat Gerulaitis in straight sets, winning his first Masters and first title in New York. Borg finished the year at No. 1 in the ATP Point rankings and was considered the No. 1 player in the world by most authorities.

=== 1980 – French and fifth consecutive Wimbledon title ===
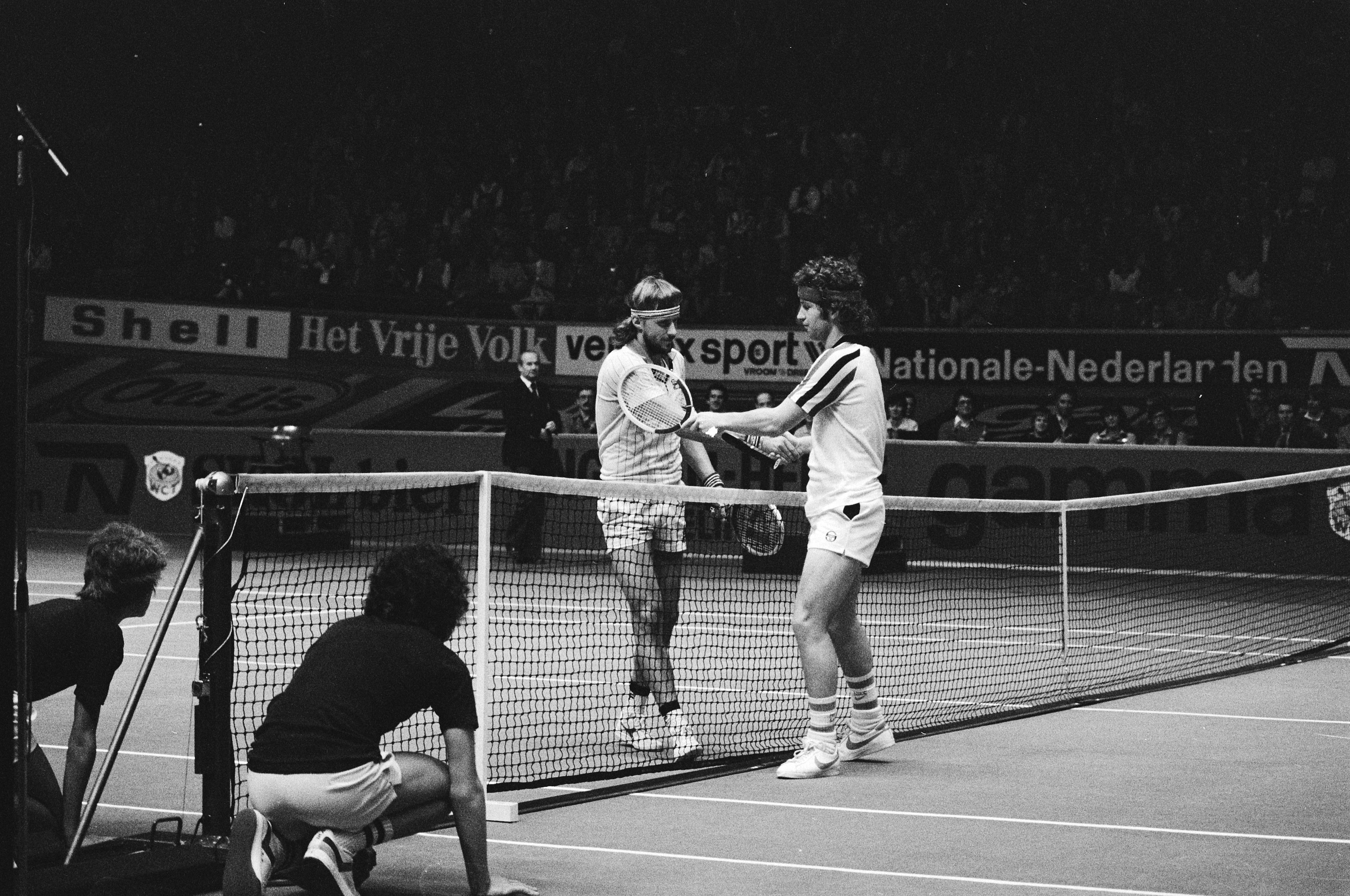
Borg (left) playing against John McEnroe in 1979

In June, Borg overcame Gerulaitis, again in straight sets, for his fifth French Open title. Again, he did not drop a set during the tournament.

Borg then won his fifth consecutive Wimbledon singles title on 5 July, defeating McEnroe in a five-set final, often cited as the best Wimbledon final ever played. Having lost the opening set to an all-out McEnroe assault, Borg took the next two sets and had two championship points at 5–4 in the fourth; however, McEnroe averted disaster. With the score 6–6, there took place Wimbledon's most memorable tiebreaker – in which McEnroe saved five championship points, and Borg six set points, before McEnroe won 18–16, taking the fourth set and levelling the match. Borg served first to begin the fifth set and fell behind 0–30, then won 19 straight points on serve, and prevailed after 3 hours, 53 minutes. Borg commented years later that this was the first time that he was afraid that he would lose, as well as feeling that it was the beginning of the end of his dominance.

In September 1980, Borg reached the final of the U.S. Open for the third time, losing to McEnroe in five sets in a match that cemented what had become the greatest contemporary rivalry, albeit short-lived, in men's tennis.

He defeated McEnroe in the final of the 1980 Stockholm Open, and faced him one more time that year, in the round-robin portion of the year-end Masters, actually played in January 1981. With 19,103 fans in attendance, Borg won a deciding third-set tie-break for the second year in a row. Borg defeated Ivan Lendl in the final for his second Masters title. Borg again finished the year at No. 1 in the ATP Point Rankings and was considered the No. 1 player in the world by most tennis authorities.

=== 1981 – Sixth and final French Open title ===
Borg won his last Grand Slam title at the French Open in 1981, defeating Lendl in a five-set final. The final was played one day after Borg's 25th birthday. Borg played in eight French Opens and won six titles, amassing a record of 49–2, a record 96.08% win rate. Only one man had beaten Borg at the French Open, Adriano Panatta, in 1973 and 1976. Borg's record six titles went unbeaten for more than three decades, until Rafael Nadal did so in 2012.

In reaching the Wimbledon final in 1981, Borg stretched his winning streak at the All England Club to a record 41 matches. In a semifinal, Borg was down to Connors by two sets to love before coming back to win the match. However, Borg's streak was brought to an end by McEnroe, who defeated him in four sets. Years afterward, Borg remarked, "And when I lost what shocked me was I wasn't even upset. That was not me: losing a Wimbledon final and not upset. I hate to lose." Borg, around that time, felt that his desire to play was gone, despite McEnroe's desperate efforts to persuade him not to retire and continue their rivalry.

Borg went on to lose to McEnroe at the 1981 US Open. After that defeat, Borg walked off the court and out of the stadium before the ceremonies and press conference had begun, and headed straight for the airport. There are reports that Borg had received threats after his semifinal win over Connors. In later years, Borg apologized to McEnroe. The 1981 US Open was Borg's last Grand Slam final. Major tournaments and tour organizers were enforcing a new rule: by 1982, players had to play at least 10 official tournaments per year. However, Borg wanted to curtail his schedule after many years of winning so often. Although he felt in good physical condition, he recognized that his relentless drive to win and defy tour organizers had begun to fade.

Borg failed to win the US Open in nine tries, losing four finals, 1976 (the surface was clay that year) and 1978 to Jimmy Connors, and 1980 and 1981 to John McEnroe. The surface was hard court from 1978 onward, and Borg reached the final there on hard court on three occasions, in 1978, 1980, and 1981. He led 3–2 in the fifth set of the 1980 final, before losing. That match followed Borg's classic encounter with McEnroe at the 1980 Wimbledon. In 1978, 1979, and 1980, Borg was halfway to a Grand Slam after victories at the French and Wimbledon (the Australian Open being the last Grand Slam tournament of each year at the time), only to falter at Flushing Meadows, the left-handed Roscoe Tanner being his conqueror in 1979.

=== 1982–91: Retirement ===
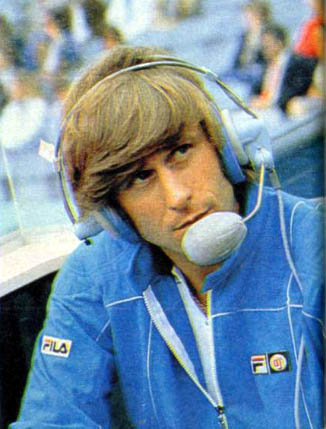
Borg as a sports commentator at the French Open in 1983

In 1982, Borg played only two tournaments. He lost to Yannick Noah in the quarterfinals of Monte Carlo in April and in the same month he lost to Dick Stockton in the second round of qualifying at the Alan King Tennis Classic in Las Vegas. Nevertheless, Borg's announcement in January 1983 that he was retiring from the game at the age of 26 was a shock to the tennis world. McEnroe tried unsuccessfully to persuade Borg to continue. He did, however, play Monte Carlo again in March 1983, reaching the second round, and Stuttgart in July 1984, losing to Henri Leconte on both occasions.

Upon retirement, Borg had three residences: a penthouse in Monte Carlo, not far from his pro shop; a mansion on Long Island, New York; and a small island off the Swedish coast.

Borg later bounced back as the owner of the Björn Borg fashion label. In Sweden, his label has become very successful, second only to Calvin Klein.

=== 1991–93: Attempted comeback ===
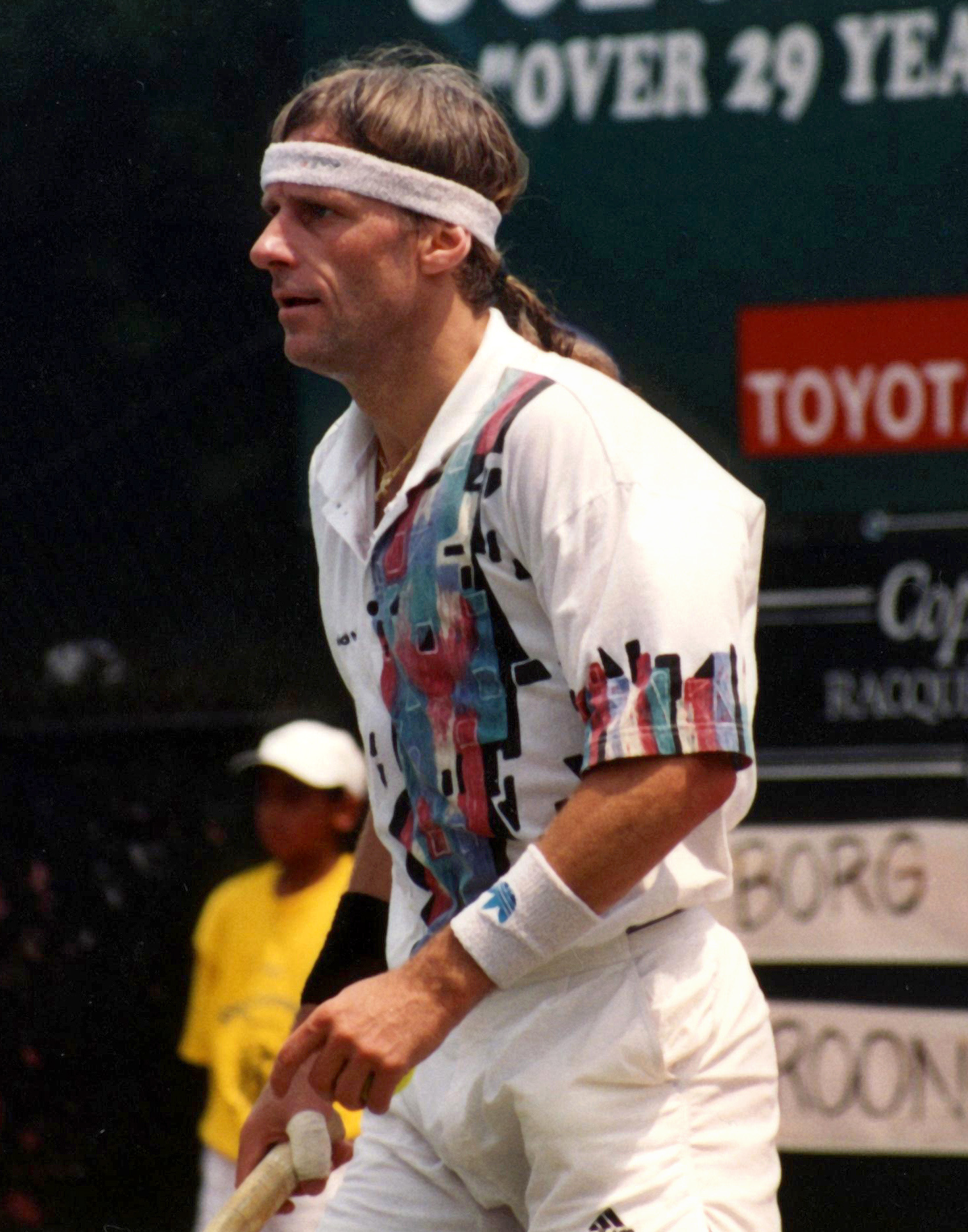
Borg in 1991

In 1991–1993, Borg attempted a comeback on the men's professional tennis tour, coached by Welsh karate expert Ron Thatcher. Before his 1991 return, Borg grew his hair out as it had been during his previous professional tennis career, and he returned to using a wooden racket; he had kept his hair short and used modern graphite rackets in exhibitions he played during the late 1980s. Borg, however, failed to win a single match. He faced Jordi Arrese in his first match back, again at Monte Carlo, but without practising or playing any exhibition matches, and lost in two sets. In his first nine matches, played in 1991 and 1992, Borg failed to win a single set. He fared slightly better in 1993, taking a set off his opponent in each of the three matches he played. On 9 November 1993 at the Kremlin Cup in Moscow in what turned out to be his final tour match, he came closest to getting a win but failed to convert a match point and eventually lost to second seed and world No. 17 Alexander Volkov 6–4, 3–6, 6–7^{(7–9)}.

In 1992, Borg, aged 35, using a graphite racket, defeated John Lloyd, 37, at the Inglewood Forum Tennis Challenge. Borg later joined the Champions tour, using modern rackets.

== Playing style ==
Borg had one of the most distinctive playing styles in the Open Era. He played from the baseline, with powerful ground-strokes. His highly unorthodox backhand involved taking his racket back with both hands but actually generating his power with his dominant right hand, letting go of the grip with his left hand around point of contact, and following through with his swing as a one-hander. He hit the ball hard and high from the back of the court and brought it down with considerable topspin, which made his ground strokes very consistent. There had been other players, particularly Rod Laver and Arthur Ashe, who played with topspin on both the forehand and backhand, yet Laver and Ashe used topspin only as a way to mix up their shots to pass their opponents at the net easily. Borg was one of the first top players to use heavy topspin on his shots consistently.

Complementing his consistent ground strokes was his fitness. Both of these factors allowed Borg to be dominant at the French Open.

One of the factors that made Borg unique was his dominance on the grass courts of Wimbledon, where, since World War II, baseliners did not usually succeed. Some experts attributed his dominance on this surface to his consistency, an underrated serve, equally underrated volleys, and his adaptation to grass courts. Against the best players, he almost always served-and-volleyed on his first serves, while he naturally played from the baseline after his second serves.

Another trait usually associated with Borg was his grace under pressure. His calm court demeanor earned him the nickname of the "Ice Man" or "Ice-Borg".

Borg's physical conditioning was unrivalled by contemporaries. He could outlast most of his opponents under the most grueling conditions. Contrary to popular belief, however, this was not due to his exceptionally low resting heart rate, often reported to be near 35 beats per minute. In his introduction to Borg's autobiography My Life and Game, Eugene Scott relates that this rumor arose from a medical exam the 18-year-old Borg once took for military service, where his pulse was recorded as 38. Scott goes on to reveal Borg's true pulse rate as "about 50 when he wakes up and around 60 in the afternoon". Borg is credited with helping to develop the style of play that has come to dominate the game today.

== Mental approach ==
Borg's first wife has said that he was "always very placid and calm, except if he lost a match – he wouldn't talk for at least three days. He couldn't stand losing." This mental approach changed by 1981, when he has said that when he lost the Wimbledon final "what shocked me was I wasn't even upset".

== Personal life ==
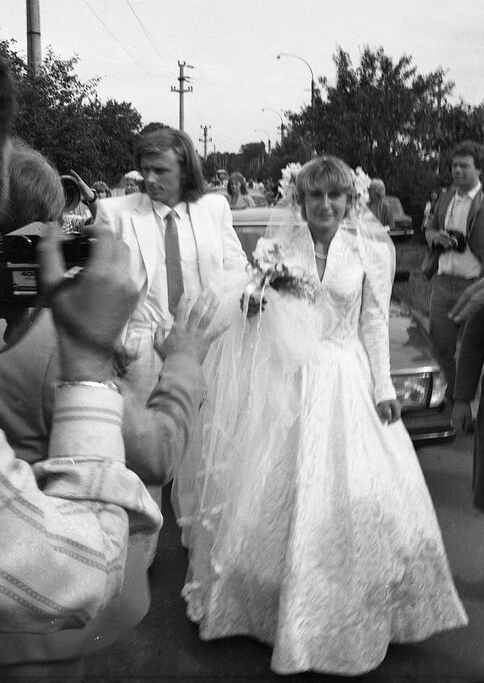
Borg and Mariana Simionescu in Snagov, Romania, on 24 July 1980

Borg and Romanian tennis pro Mariana Simionescu began their relationship in 1976 and married in Bucharest on 24 July 1980. The marriage ended in divorce in 1984. He fathered a son in 1985 with the Swedish model Jannike Björling. Borg was married to the Italian singer Loredana Bertè from 1989 to 1993. On 8 June 2002, he married his third wife, Patricia Östfeld. Together they have a son, Leo, born in 2003, who is also a professional tennis player.

He narrowly avoided personal bankruptcy when business ventures failed. After selling his mansion Astaholm at Ingarö in the Stockholm archipelago in 2019, Borg moved to an apartment in Norrmalm, central Stockholm.

In his 2025 autobiography Heartbeats, Borg revealed that he had been diagnosed with an "extremely aggressive" form of prostate cancer in 2023. He underwent surgery in 2024, and now lives in remission with regular monitoring.

== Film ==
In 2017, Borg vs McEnroe, a biographical film focusing on the rivalry between Borg and McEnroe and the 1980 Wimbledon final, was released. In 2022, interviews about this friendship and rivalry were also featured in "McEnroe", a Showtime documentary.

== Memorabilia preserved ==
In March 2006, Bonhams Auction House in London announced that it would auction Borg's Wimbledon trophies and two of his winning rackets on 21 June 2006. Several players then called Borg in an attempt to make him reconsider, including Jimmy Connors and Andre Agassi, who volunteered to buy them to keep them together. According to Dagens Nyheter – who had talked to Borg – McEnroe called Borg from New York and asked, "What's up? Have you gone mad?" and said, "What the hell are you doing?" The conversation with McEnroe, paired with pleas from Connors and Agassi, eventually persuaded Borg to buy out the trophies from Bonhams for an undisclosed amount.

== Distinctions and honors ==
- Borg was ranked by the ATP rankings as world no. 1 in six stretches between 1977 and 1981, totaling 109 weeks.
- During his career, he won a total of 77 (64 listed on the Association of Tennis Professionals website) top-level singles and four doubles titles.
- Borg won the BBC Sports Personality of the Year Overseas Personality Award in 1979.
- Borg was inducted into the International Tennis Hall of Fame in 1987.
- On 10 December 2006, the British Broadcasting Corporation gave Borg a Lifetime Achievement Award, which was presented by Boris Becker.
- In December 2014 he was elected Sweden's top sportsperson of all time by the newspaper Dagens Nyheter.

== Recognition ==
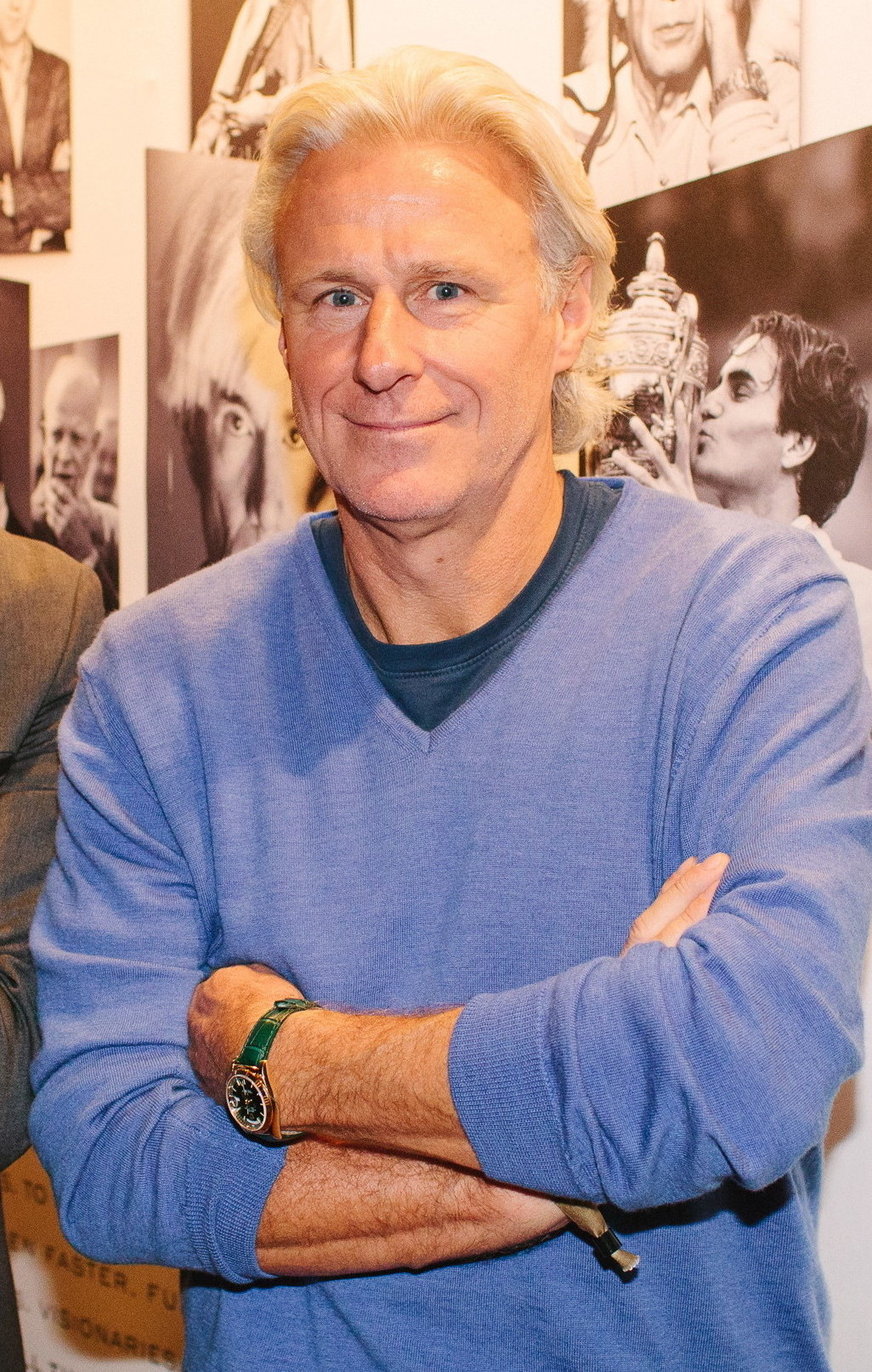
Borg in 2013

With 11 Grand Slam titles, Borg ranks sixth in the list of male tennis players who have won the most Grand Slam singles titles behind Novak Djokovic (24), Rafael Nadal (22), Roger Federer (20), Pete Sampras (14) and Roy Emerson (12). The French Open—Wimbledon double he achieved three times consecutively was described by Wimbledon officials as "the most difficult double in tennis". Only Nadal (in 2008 and 2010), Federer (in 2009), Djokovic (in 2021) and Alcaraz (in 2024) have managed to achieve this double since, and Agassi, Nadal, Federer, Djokovic and Carlos Alcaraz are the only male players since Borg to have won the French Open and Wimbledon men's singles titles over their career. Ilie Năstase once said about Borg, "We're playing tennis, and he's playing something else". Borg is widely considered to be one of the greatest players in the history of the sport.

In his 1979 autobiography, Jack Kramer had already included Borg in his list of the 21 greatest players of all time. And in 2003, Bud Collins chose Borg as one of his top-five male players of all time. In 1983, Fred Perry listed his greatest male players of all time and listed them in two categories, before World War 2 and after. Perry's modern best behind Laver: "Borg, McEnroe, Connors, Hoad, Jack Kramer, John Newcombe, Ken Rosewall, Manuel Santana". In 1988, a panel consisting of Bud Collins, Cliff Drysdale, and Butch Buchholz ranked their top five male tennis players of all time. Buchholz and Drysdale both listed Borg number two on their lists, behind Rod Laver. Collins listed Borg number five behind Laver, McEnroe, Rosewall, and Gonzales.

In 2008, ESPN.com asked tennis analysts, writers, and former players to build the perfect open-era player. Borg was the only player mentioned in four categories: defense, footwork, intangibles, and mental toughness—with his mental game and footwork singled out as the best in open-era history.

Borg never won the US Open, losing in the final four times. Borg also did not win the Australian Open, which he only played once in 1974 as a 17-year-old. The only players to defeat Borg in a Grand Slam final were fellow World No. 1 tennis players John McEnroe and Jimmy Connors. Even though it was then played on grass, a surface where he enjoyed much success, Borg chose to play the Australian Open only once, in 1974, where he lost in the third round. Phil Dent, a contemporary of Borg, has pointed out that skipping Grand Slam tournaments—especially the Australian Open—was not unusual then, before counting Grand Slam titles became the norm. Additionally, another contemporary Arthur Ashe told Sports Illustrated, "I think Bjorn could have won the US Open. I think he could have won the Grand Slam, but by the time he left, the historical challenge didn't mean anything. He was bigger than the game. He was like Elvis or Liz Taylor or somebody."

== Laver Cup ==
From 22 to 24 September 2017, Borg was the victorious captain of Team Europe in the first-ever edition of the Laver Cup, held in Prague, Czech Republic. Borg's Team Europe defeated the rest of the world team, known as Team World, who were coached by John McEnroe. Europe won the contest 15 points to 9, with Roger Federer achieving a narrow, vital victory over Nick Kyrgios in the last match played.

Borg returned as the coach of Team Europe for the second edition in Chicago, Illinois, from 21 to 23 September 2018. McEnroe also returned as the coach for Team World. Borg again led Europe to victory as Alexander Zverev defeated Kevin Anderson to secure the title 13–8, after trailing Anderson in the match tiebreak until the last few points.

In the tournament's third edition, held in Geneva, Switzerland, from 20 to 22 September 2019, Borg captained Team Europe to a third consecutive victory, defeating McEnroe's Team World 13 points to 11, with Zverev again winning the deciding match.

The fourth edition was held in Boston from 24 to 26 September 2021, having had its original September 2020 date postponed due to the COVID-19 pandemic. Borg once again returned as captain of Team Europe, which had a resounding win over Team World, defeating McEnroe's players 14 to 1.

== Career statistics ==
=== Singles performance timeline ===
Key
**W**	F	SF	QF	#R	RR	Q#	DNQ	A	NH

(W) winner; (F) finalist; (SF) semifinalist; (QF) quarterfinalist; (#R) rounds 4, 3, 2, 1; (RR) round-robin stage; (Q#) qualification round; (DNQ) did not qualify; (A) absent; (NH) not held; (SR) strike rate (events won / competed); (W–L) win–loss record.

Tournament	1972	1973	1974	1975	1976	1977		1978	1979	1980	1981	SR	W–L	Win %
**Grand Slam tournaments**
Australian Open	A	A	3R	A	A	A	A	A	A	A	A	0 / 1	1–1	50.00
French Open	A	4R	**W**	**W**	QF	A		**W**	**W**	**W**	**W**	6 / 8	49–2	96.08
Wimbledon	A	QF	3R	QF	**W**	**W**		**W**	**W**	**W**	F	5 / 9	51–4	92.73
US Open	PR*	4R	2R	SF	F	4R		F	QF	F	F	0 / 10	40–10	80.00
Win–loss	0–1	10–3	11–3	16–2	17–2	10–1		20–1	18–1	20–1	19–2	11 / 28	141–17	89.24
**Year-end championship**
The Masters (Note: The Masters tournaments for 1977, 1979, and 1980 were actually held in January of the following year. In this table, however, the year of the tournament is listed for the preceding year.)	A	A	RR	F	A	F		A	**W**	**W**	A	2 / 5	16–6	72.72
WCT Finals	A	A	F	F	**W**	A		SF	F	A	A	1 / 5	10–3	76.92
**Year-end ranking**		18	**3**	**3**	**2**	**3**		**2**	**1**	**1**	4	$3,655,751		

- The Australian Open was held twice in 1977, in January and December. Borg did not play in either.
- The 1972 US Open had a special preliminary round before the main 128-player draw began.

=== Records ===
- These records were attained in the entire period of tennis from 1877.
- Records in **bold** indicate peer-less achievements.
- ^ Denotes consecutive streak.

==== All-time records ====
Tournament	Since	Record accomplished	Players matched	References
**Grand Slam**	1972	86.96% (20–3) five-set match record	**Stands alone**	
**Grand Slam**	1977	3 consecutive Channel Slams, French Open + Wimbledon (1978–80) ^	**Stands alone**	
**Grand Slam**	1978	Grand Slam title won (1978 French Open) with fewest games lost (32)	**Stands alone**	
**Wimbledon**	1977	92.73% (51–4) match win percentage	**Stands alone**	
**Wimbledon**	1977	41 consecutive match wins	**Stands alone**	

==== Open Era records ====
- These records were attained in the Open Era period of tennis from 1968.
- Records in **bold** indicate peer-less achievements.
- ^ Denotes consecutive streak.

Time span	Selected Grand Slam tournament records	Players matched	References
1976 Wimbledon — 1981 French Open	41% (11/27) title winning percentage	**Stands alone**	
1976 Wimbledon — 1981 French Open	89.24% (141–17) career match winning percentage	**Stands alone**	
1977–1981	5 consecutive years with a match winning percentage of 90%+ ^	**Stands alone**	
1978 French Open — 1978 US Open	66.5% (380–191) games winning percentage in 1 season	**Stands alone**	
1978 French Open	79.9% (127–32) games won in one tournament	**Stands alone**	
1976 Wimbledon — 1980 Wimbledon	6 existing Major champions defeated in finals	Roger Federer	(Note: The existing Major champions Borg defeated were Guillermo Vilas (1978 French Open), Ilie Năstase (1976 Wimbledon), Jimmy Connors (1977 & 1978 Wimbledon), Roscoe Tanner (1979 Wimbledon), Vitas Gerulaitis (1980 French Open) and John McEnroe (1980 Wimbledon). These champions were competing on the tour at the same time, after Borg had defeated all 6 of them in Major finals, and had not retired.)
1976 Wimbledon — 1980 Wimbledon	6 concurrent Major champions defeated in finals	**Stands alone**	
1980 Wimbledon	Longest tiebreak in a final (by points – 34) vs. John McEnroe	John McEnroe	
1974 French Open	Won a Grand Slam final from two sets down.	Ivan Lendl; Andre Agassi; Gastón Gaudio; Dominic Thiem; Novak Djokovic; Rafael Nadal; Jannik Sinner; Carlos Alcaraz	

Grand Slam tournaments	Time span	Records at each Grand Slam tournament	Players matched	References
French Open	1979–1981	41 consecutive sets won ^	**Stands alone**	
French Open	1978	79.9% (127–32) games winning percentage in 1 tournament	**Stands alone**	
French Open—Wimbledon	1978–1980	3 consecutive "Channel Slams": Winning both tournaments in the same year ^	**Stands alone**	
Wimbledon	1976–1980	5 consecutive titles ^	Roger Federer	
Wimbledon	1976	Won title without losing a set	Roger Federer	
Wimbledon	1976–1981	41 consecutive match wins	**Stands alone**	
Wimbledon	1973–1981	92.73% (51–4) match winning percentage	**Stands alone**	

Time span	Other selected records	Players matched	References
1973–1981	72.5% (111–42) career winning percentage against top 10 players	**Stands alone**	
1977–1980	4 consecutive years with a match winning percentage of 90%+	**Stands alone**	
1979–1980	10 consecutive titles	**Stands alone**	
1978	50 consecutive matches won in 1 season	**Stands alone**	
1978–1980	2 winning streaks of 35+ matches ^	Roger Federer; Jimmy Connors	
1974–1981	63 titles until the age of 25	**Stands alone**	
1974–1976	17 titles won as a teenager	**Stands alone**	
1972–1981	81.8% (27–6) career 5 set match record	Jean Borotra; Johan Kriek	

== Professional awards ==
- ITF World Champion: 1978, 1979, 1980
- ATP Player of the Year: 1976, 1977, 1978, 1979, 1980

== See also ==
- Borg–Connors rivalry
- Borg–McEnroe rivalry
- List of Grand Slam men's singles champions
- List of Swedish sportspeople
- World number one male tennis player rankings

== Sources ==
- Borg, Björn (1975). The Björn Borg Story. Chicago: H. Regnery Co. ISBN 0-8092-8184-8.
- Borg, Björn; Eugene L. Scott (1980). My Life and Game. New York: Simon and Schuster. ISBN 0-283-98663-8.
- John Barrett, editor, World of Tennis Yearbooks, London, from 1976 through 1983.
- Michel Sutter, Vainqueurs Winners 1946–2003, Paris, 2003. Sutter has attempted to list all tournaments meeting his criteria for selection beginning with 1946 and ending in the fall of 1991. For each tournament, he has indicated the city, the date of the final, the winner, the runner-up, and the score of the final. A tournament is included in his list if: (1) the draw for the tournament included at least eight players (with a few exceptions, such as the Pepsi Grand Slam tournaments in the second half of the 1970s which included only players that had won a Grand Slam tournament); and (2) the level of the tournaments was at least equal to the present day challenger tournaments. Sutter's book is probably the most exhaustive source of tennis tournament information since World War II, even though some professional tournaments held before the start of the open era are missing. Later, Sutter issued a second edition of his book, with only the players, their wins, and years for the 1946 through 27 April 2003, period.

== Video ==
- The Wimbledon Collection – Legends of Wimbledon – Björn Borg Standing Room Only, DVD Release Date: 21 September 2004, Run Time: 52 minutes, ASIN: B0002HODA4.
- The Wimbledon Collection – The Classic Match – Borg vs. McEnroe 1981 Final Standing Room Only, DVD Release Date: 21 September 2004, Run Time: 210 minutes, ASIN: B0002HODAE.
- The Wimbledon Collection – The Classic Match – Borg vs. McEnroe 1980 Final Standing Room Only, DVD Release Date: 21 September 2004, Run Time: 240 minutes; ASIN: B0002HOEK8.
- Wimbledon Classic Match: Gerulaitis vs Borg Standing Room Only, DVD Release Date: 31 October 2006, Run Time: 180 minutes, ASIN: B000ICLR8O.

Sporting positions
Preceded by Jimmy Connors; Jimmy Connors; Jimmy Connors; John McEnroe; John McEnroe; John McEnroe	World No. 1; 23 August 1977 – 29 August 1977; 9 April 1979 – 20 May 1979; 9 July 1979 – 2 March 1980; 24 March 1980 – 10 August 1980; 18 August 1980 – 5 July 1981; 20 July 1981 – 2 August 1981	Succeeded by Jimmy Connors; Jimmy Connors; John McEnroe; John McEnroe; John McEnroe; John McEnroe
Awards and achievements
Preceded by Rolf Edling	Svenska Dagbladet Gold Medal; 1974	Succeeded by Ingemar Stenmark
Preceded by Frank Andersson	Svenska Dagbladet Gold Medal with Ingemar Stenmark; 1978	Succeeded by Malmö FF
Preceded by —	ITF World Champion; 1978–1980	Succeeded by John McEnroe
Preceded by Muhammad Ali	BBC Overseas Sports Personality of the Year; 1979	Succeeded by Jack Nicklaus
Records
Preceded by John Newcombe; Rod Laver	Most career Grand Slam singles titles (open era); 8 July 1978 – 4 July 1999	Succeeded by Pete Sampras
