= 1977 Grand Prix (tennis) =

Tennis circuit

1977 Grand Prix circuit
Details
- Duration: 26 December 1976 – 8 January 1978
- Edition: 8th
- Tournaments: 76

Achievements (singles)
- Most titles: (Argentina) Guillermo Vilas (16)
- Most finals: (Argentina) Guillermo Vilas (22)
- Prize money leader: (Argentina) Guillermo Vilas ($635,000)
- Points leader: (Argentina) Guillermo Vilas (2,047)

Awards
- Player of the year: (Sweden) Björn Borg
- Newcomer of the year: (United States) Tim Gullikson

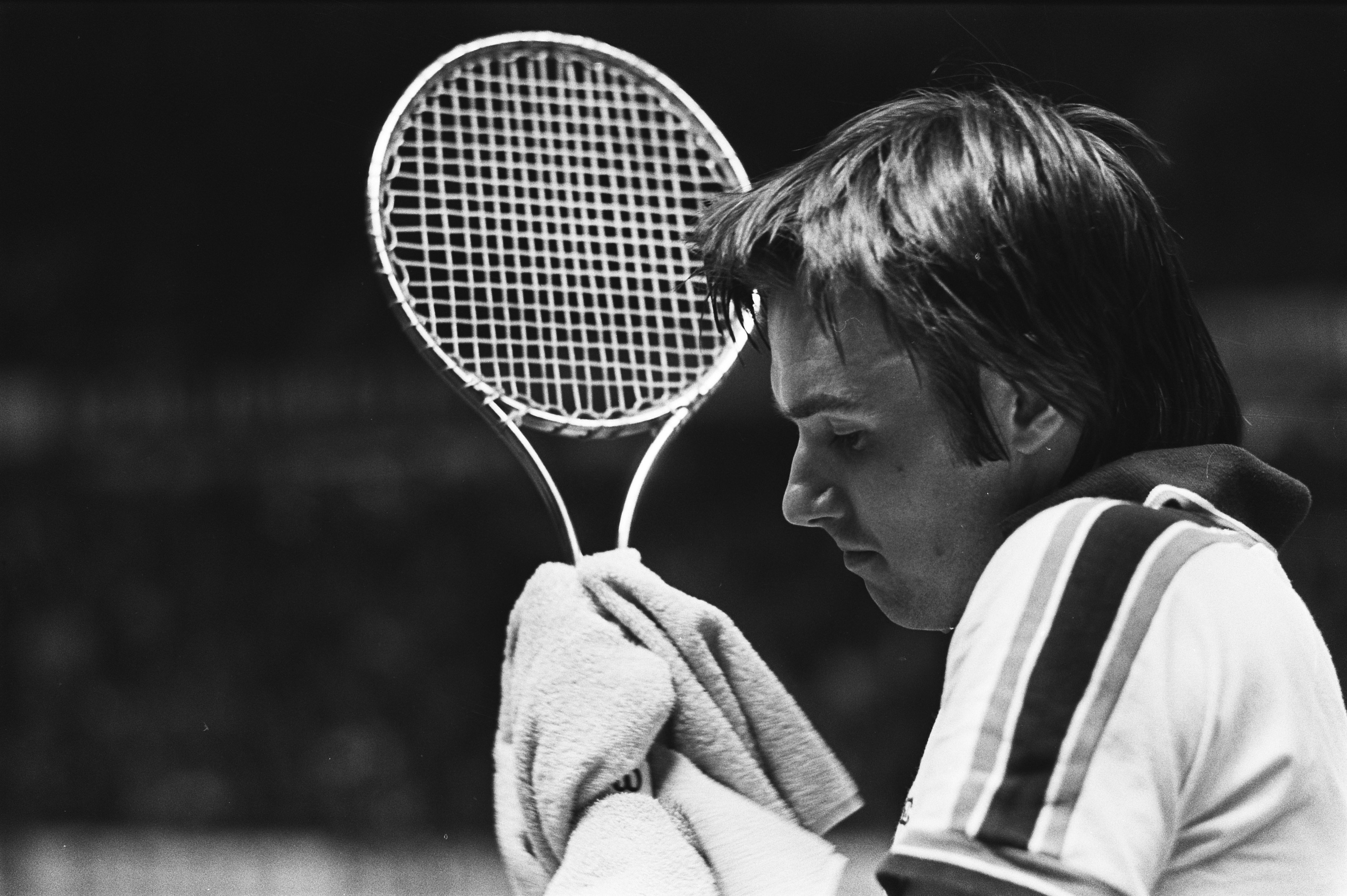
Jimmy Connors finished the year as ATP world No. 1 for the fourth time in his career. Connors won three titles during the season, including the Masters Grand Prix, and was runner-up at two majors at the Wimbledon Championships and the US Open.

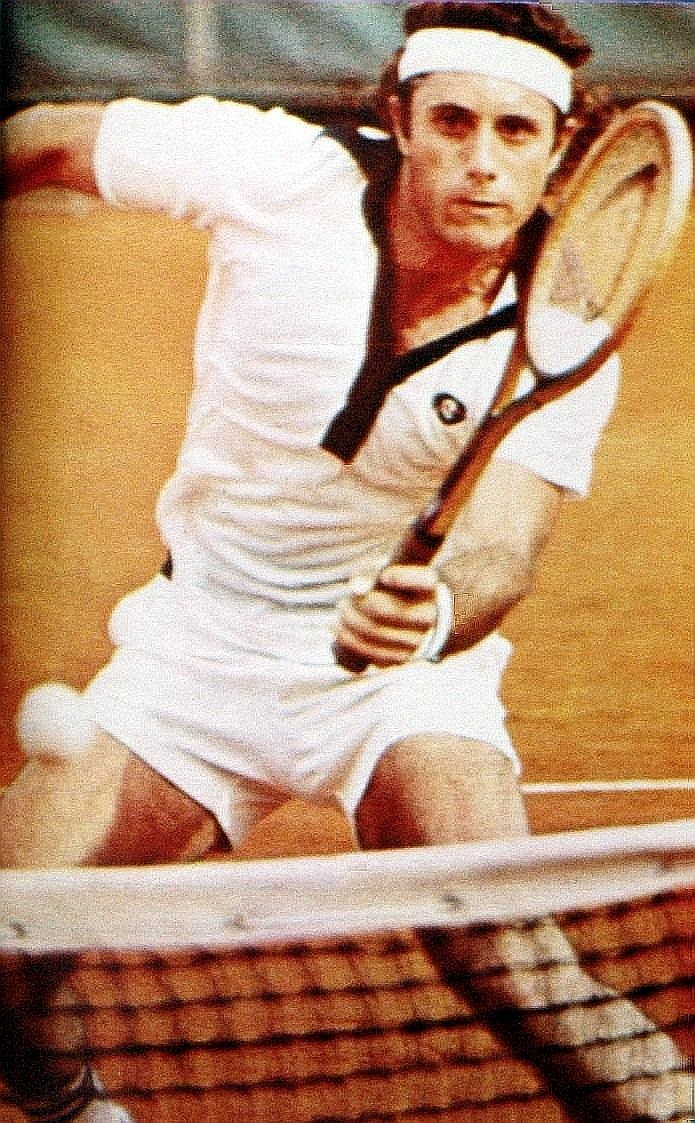
Guillermo Vilas was the 1977 Grand Prix No. 1. Vilas won 16 tournaments during the season, including two majors at the French Open and the US Open.

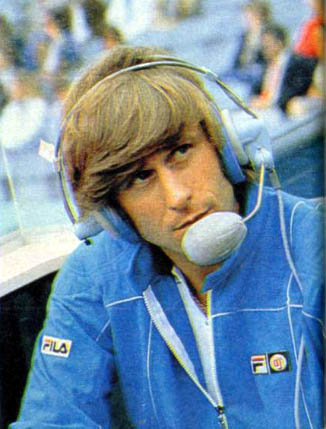
Björn Borg was named the ATP Player of the Year. Borg won nine tournaments during the season, including a major at the Wimbledon Championships.

The 1977 Colgate-Palmolive Grand Prix was a professional tennis circuit administered by the International Lawn Tennis Federation (ILTF, later the ITF) which served as a forerunner to the current Association of Tennis Professionals (ATP) World Tour and the Women's Tennis Association (WTA) Tour. The circuit consisted of the four modern Grand Slam tournaments and open tournaments recognised by the ILTF. The Colgate-Palmolive Masters is included in this calendar but did not count towards the Grand Prix ranking. Colgate-Palmolive was the new tour sponsor, taking over from Commercial Union. Guillermo Vilas won the Grand Prix circuit, having accumulated the most points (2,047), and received the largest share from the bonus pool ($300,000). The top eight points ranked singles players as well as the top four doubles teams qualified for the season-ending Masters tournament

== Schedule ==
Key

Triple Crown events
Grand Prix Masters
Six-star events
Five-star events
Four-star events
Three-star events
Two-star events
One-star events
Team events

=== December 1976 ===
Week	Tournament	Champions	Runners-up	Semifinalists	Quarterfinalists
26 Dec	Marlboro New South Wales Open; Sydney, Australia; Grass – $75,000 – 48S/24D; Two star	(Australia) Tony Roche; 6–3, 3–6, 6–3, 6–4	(United States) Dick Stockton	(Argentina) Guillermo Vilas (United States) Roscoe Tanner	(Australia) Ross Case (Australia) Phil Dent (Australia) Ken Rosewall (United States) Hank Pfister
26 Dec	Marlboro New South Wales Open; Sydney, Australia; Grass – $75,000 – 48S/24D; Two star	(Australia) Syd Ball (Australia) Kim Warwick; 6–3, 6–4	(Australia) Mark Edmondson (Australia) John Marks	(Argentina) Guillermo Vilas (United States) Roscoe Tanner	(Australia) Ross Case (Australia) Phil Dent (Australia) Ken Rosewall (United States) Hank Pfister

=== January ===
Week	Tournament	Champions	Runners-up	Semifinalists	Quarterfinalists
3 Jan	Australian Open (January); Melbourne, Australia; Grand Slam; Grass – $200,000 – 64S/32D; Singles – Doubles	(United States) Roscoe Tanner; 6–3, 6–3, 6–3	(Argentina) Guillermo Vilas	(Australia) John Alexander (Australia) Ken Rosewall	(Australia) Ross Case (United States) Arthur Ashe (Australia) Mark Edmondson (Australia) Phil Dent
3 Jan	Australian Open (January); Melbourne, Australia; Grand Slam; Grass – $200,000 – 64S/32D; Singles – Doubles	(United States) Arthur Ashe (Australia) Tony Roche; 6–4, 6–4	(United States) Charlie Pasarell (United States) Erik van Dillen	(Australia) John Alexander (Australia) Ken Rosewall	(Australia) Ross Case (United States) Arthur Ashe (Australia) Mark Edmondson (Australia) Phil Dent
10 Jan	Marlboro Classic; Adelaide, Australia; Grass – $75,000 – 48S/24D; Two star Singles – Doubles	(United States) Victor Amaya; 6–1, 6–4, 6–2	(United States) Brian Teacher	(Australia) John Alexander (United States) Charlie Pasarell	(West Germany) Rolf Gehring (Australia) Colin Dibley (United States) Dick Stockton (United States) Sherwood Stewart
10 Jan	Marlboro Classic; Adelaide, Australia; Grass – $75,000 – 48S/24D; Two star Singles – Doubles	(Australia) Cliff Letcher (United States) Dick Stockton; 6–3, 4–6, 6–4	(Australia) Syd Ball (Australia) Kim Warwick	(Australia) John Alexander (United States) Charlie Pasarell	(West Germany) Rolf Gehring (Australia) Colin Dibley (United States) Dick Stockton (United States) Sherwood Stewart
17 Jan	Baltimore International; Baltimore, United States; Carpet – 32S/16D; Three star	(United States) Brian Gottfried; 6–3, 7–6	(Argentina) Guillermo Vilas	(United States) Tom Gorman (Czechoslovakia) Jan Kodeš	(Australia) Ross Case (United Kingdom) Roger Taylor (United States) Billy Martin (United Kingdom) Buster Mottram
17 Jan	Baltimore International; Baltimore, United States; Carpet – 32S/16D; Three star	(Romania) Ion Țiriac (Argentina) Guillermo Vilas; 6–3, 6–7, 6–4	(Australia) Ross Case (Czechoslovakia) Jan Kodeš	(United States) Tom Gorman (Czechoslovakia) Jan Kodeš	(Australia) Ross Case (United Kingdom) Roger Taylor (United States) Billy Martin (United Kingdom) Buster Mottram
31 Jan	Fairfield Bay Tennis Classic; Little Rock, United States; Hard – $50,000 – 32S/16D; One star	(United States) Sandy Mayer; 6–2, 6–4	(Pakistan) Haroon Rahim	(Sweden) Björn Borg (United States) Nick Saviano	(United States) Peter Fleming (Czechoslovakia) Jiří Hřebec (Australia) Colin Dibley (United States) Mike Machette
31 Jan	Fairfield Bay Tennis Classic; Little Rock, United States; Hard – $50,000 – 32S/16D; One star	(Australia) Colin Dibley (Pakistan) Haroon Rahim; 6–7, 6–3, 6–3	(South Africa) Bob Hewitt (South Africa) Frew McMillan	(Sweden) Björn Borg (United States) Nick Saviano	(United States) Peter Fleming (Czechoslovakia) Jiří Hřebec (Australia) Colin Dibley (United States) Mike Machette
31 Jan	Dayton Pro Tennis Classic; Dayton, United States; Carpet – $50,000 – 32S/16D; One star	(United States) Jeff Borowiak; 6–3, 6–3	(United Kingdom) Buster Mottram	(United States) Tom Gullikson (Soviet Union) Alex Metreveli	(United States) Terry Moor (West Germany) Frank Gebert (United States) Sherwood Stewart (United States) Butch Walts
31 Jan	Dayton Pro Tennis Classic; Dayton, United States; Carpet – $50,000 – 32S/16D; One star	(United States) Hank Pfister (United States) Butch Walts; 6–4, 7–6	(United States) Jeff Borowiak (Rhodesia) Andrew Pattison	(United States) Tom Gullikson (Soviet Union) Alex Metreveli	(United States) Terry Moor (West Germany) Frank Gebert (United States) Sherwood Stewart (United States) Butch Walts

=== February ===
Week	Tournament	Champions	Runners-up	Semifinalists	Quarterfinalists
7 Feb	Miami Classic; Miami, United States; Clay – $50,000 – 32S/16D; One star	(United States) Eddie Dibbs; 6–0, 6–3	(Mexico) Raúl Ramírez	(United States) Brian Gottfried (United States) Harold Solomon	(Soviet Union) Teimuraz Kakoulia (Soviet Union) Alex Metreveli (Argentina) Lito Álvarez (Australia) Cliff Letcher
7 Feb	Miami Classic; Miami, United States; Clay – $50,000 – 32S/16D; One star	(United States) Brian Gottfried (Mexico) Raúl Ramírez; 7–5, 6–4	(Australia) Paul Kronk (Australia) Cliff Letcher	(United States) Brian Gottfried (United States) Harold Solomon	(Soviet Union) Teimuraz Kakoulia (Soviet Union) Alex Metreveli (Argentina) Lito Álvarez (Australia) Cliff Letcher
7 Feb	Springfield International; Springfield, United States; Carpet – $50,000 – 32S/16D; One star	(Argentina) Guillermo Vilas; 3–6, 6–0, 6–3, 6–2	(United States) Stan Smith	(United States) Gene Mayer (Hungary) Balázs Taróczy	(United States) Peter Fleming (South Africa) Bob Hewitt (United Kingdom) Buster Mottram (Pakistan) Haroon Rahim
7 Feb	Springfield International; Springfield, United States; Carpet – $50,000 – 32S/16D; One star	(South Africa) Bob Hewitt (South Africa) Frew McMillan; 7–6, 6–2	(Romania) Ion Țiriac (Argentina) Guillermo Vilas	(United States) Gene Mayer (Hungary) Balázs Taróczy	(United States) Peter Fleming (South Africa) Bob Hewitt (United Kingdom) Buster Mottram (Pakistan) Haroon Rahim
14 Feb	American Home Shield Open; San Jose, United States; Hard – 32S/16D; One star	(Czechoslovakia) Jiří Hřebec; 3–6, 6–4, 7–5	(United States) Sandy Mayer	(United States) Billy Martin (Australia) Roy Emerson	(United States) Tim Gullikson (Australia) Steve Docherty (Australia) Phil Dent (United States) Roscoe Tanner
14 Feb	American Home Shield Open; San Jose, United States; Hard – 32S/16D; One star	(South Africa) Bob Hewitt (South Africa) Frew McMillan; 6–2, 6–3	(United States) Tom Gorman (Australia) Geoff Masters	(United States) Billy Martin (Australia) Roy Emerson	(United States) Tim Gullikson (Australia) Steve Docherty (Australia) Phil Dent (United States) Roscoe Tanner
21 Feb	American Airlines Tennis Games; Palm Springs, United States; Hard – $225,000 – 64S/32D; Six star	(United States) Brian Gottfried; 2–6, 6–1, 6–3	(Argentina) Guillermo Vilas	(United States) Bill Scanlon (Mexico) Raúl Ramírez	(Australia) Phil Dent (United States) Charlie Pasarell (United States) Harold Solomon (South Africa) Frew McMillan
21 Feb	American Airlines Tennis Games; Palm Springs, United States; Hard – $225,000 – 64S/32D; Six star	(South Africa) Bob Hewitt (South Africa) Frew McMillan; 7–6, 7–6	(United States) Marty Riessen (United States) Roscoe Tanner	(United States) Bill Scanlon (Mexico) Raúl Ramírez	(Australia) Phil Dent (United States) Charlie Pasarell (United States) Harold Solomon (South Africa) Frew McMillan
28 Feb	U.S. National Indoor Championships; Memphis, United States; Carpet – $175,000 – 64S/32D; Six star	(Sweden) Björn Borg; 6–4, 6–3, 4–6, 7–5	(United States) Brian Gottfried	(United States) Tom Gullikson (United Kingdom) Mark Cox	(United States) Bob Lutz (United States) Fred McNair (United States) Tom Gullikson (Spain) José Higueras
28 Feb	U.S. National Indoor Championships; Memphis, United States; Carpet – $175,000 – 64S/32D; Six star	(United States) Fred McNair (United States) Sherwood Stewart; 4–6, 7–6, 7–6	(United States) Robert Lutz (United States) Stan Smith	(United States) Tom Gullikson (United Kingdom) Mark Cox	(United States) Bob Lutz (United States) Fred McNair (United States) Tom Gullikson (Spain) José Higueras

=== March ===
Week	Tournament	Champions	Runners-up	Semifinalists	Quarterfinalists
7 Mar	Peugeot South African Open; Johannesburg, South Africa; Hard – $150,000 – 32S/16D; Five star	No Winner	(Sweden) Björn Borg (Argentina) Guillermo Vilas	(Australia) Colin Dibley (United Kingdom) Buster Mottram	(Rhodesia) Andrew Pattison (United Kingdom) Roger Taylor (South Africa) Robbie Venter (West Germany) Jürgen Fassbender
7 Mar	Peugeot South African Open; Johannesburg, South Africa; Hard – $150,000 – 32S/16D; Five star	(South Africa) Bob Hewitt (South Africa) Frew McMillan; 6–2, 6–0	(United States) Charlie Pasarell (United States) Erik van Dillen	(Australia) Colin Dibley (United Kingdom) Buster Mottram	(Rhodesia) Andrew Pattison (United Kingdom) Roger Taylor (South Africa) Robbie Venter (West Germany) Jürgen Fassbender
7 Mar	Coliseum Mall International; Hampton, United States; Carpet – $50,000 – 32S/16D; One star	(United States) Sandy Mayer; 4–6, 6–3, 6–2, 1–6, 6–3	(United States) Stan Smith	(United States) Jeff Borowiak (United States) Tom Gullikson	(United States) Tim Gullikson (United States) James Hagey (Socialist Federal Republic of Yugoslavia) Željko Franulović (Czechoslovakia) Vladimír Zedník
7 Mar	Coliseum Mall International; Hampton, United States; Carpet – $50,000 – 32S/16D; One star	(United States) Sandy Mayer (United States) Stan Smith; 6–4, 6–3	(Australia) Paul Kronk (Australia) Cliff Letcher	(United States) Jeff Borowiak (United States) Tom Gullikson	(United States) Tim Gullikson (United States) James Hagey (Socialist Federal Republic of Yugoslavia) Željko Franulović (Czechoslovakia) Vladimír Zedník
14 Mar	Volvo Classic; Washington, United States; Carpet – $100,000 – 32S/16D; Three star	(United States) Brian Gottfried; 6–1, 6–2	(United States) Bob Lutz	(United States) Tom Gorman (Mexico) Raúl Ramírez	(United States) Jeff Borowiak (United States) John Whitlinger (United States) Stan Smith (United States) Sandy Mayer
14 Mar	Volvo Classic; Washington, United States; Carpet – $100,000 – 32S/16D; Three star	(United States) Bob Lutz (United States) Stan Smith; 6–3, 7–5	(United States) Brian Gottfried (Mexico) Raúl Ramírez	(United States) Tom Gorman (Mexico) Raúl Ramírez	(United States) Jeff Borowiak (United States) John Whitlinger (United States) Stan Smith (United States) Sandy Mayer
14 Mar	Scandinavian Covered Court Championships; Helsinki, Finland; Carpet – $50,000 – 32S/16D; One star	(United Kingdom) Mark Cox; 6–3, 6–3	(Sweden) Kjell Johansson	(Sweden) Ove Bengtson (Czechoslovakia) Jiří Granat	(France) Hervé Gauvain (Australia) John James (United Kingdom) John Lloyd (United Kingdom) Richard Lewis
14 Mar	Scandinavian Covered Court Championships; Helsinki, Finland; Carpet – $50,000 – 32S/16D; One star	(Czechoslovakia) Jiří Hřebec (Austria) Hans Kary; 5–7, 7–6, 6–4	(United Kingdom) David Lloyd (United Kingdom) John Lloyd	(Sweden) Ove Bengtson (Czechoslovakia) Jiří Granat	(France) Hervé Gauvain (Australia) John James (United Kingdom) John Lloyd (United Kingdom) Richard Lewis
21 Mar	La Costa International Tennis Classic; La Costa, United States; Hard – $100,000 – 64S/32D; Three star	(United States) Brian Gottfried; 6–3, 6–2	(United States) Marty Riessen	(Sweden) Björn Borg (United States) Hank Pfister	(United States) Tom Gorman (United States) Trey Waltke (Australia) Roy Emerson (Australia) Allan Stone
21 Mar	La Costa International Tennis Classic; La Costa, United States; Hard – $100,000 – 64S/32D; Three star	(South Africa) Bob Hewitt (South Africa) Frew McMillan; 6–4, 6–2	(Australia) Ray Ruffels (Australia) Allan Stone	(Sweden) Björn Borg (United States) Hank Pfister	(United States) Tom Gorman (United States) Trey Waltke (Australia) Roy Emerson (Australia) Allan Stone
28 Mar	Arco Pacific Southwest Open; Los Angeles, United States; Carpet – $150,000 – 64S/32D; Five star	(United States) Stan Smith; 6–4, 2–6, 6–3	(United States) Brian Gottfried	(United States) Roscoe Tanner (United States) Peter Fleming	(United States) Cliff Richey (United States) Bob Lutz (United States) Jeff Borowiak (Mexico) Raúl Ramírez
28 Mar	Arco Pacific Southwest Open; Los Angeles, United States; Carpet – $150,000 – 64S/32D; Five star	(South Africa) Bob Hewitt (South Africa) Frew McMillan; 6–3, 6–4	(United States) Robert Lutz (United States) Stan Smith	(United States) Roscoe Tanner (United States) Peter Fleming	(United States) Cliff Richey (United States) Bob Lutz (United States) Jeff Borowiak (Mexico) Raúl Ramírez
28 Mar	Nice International Championships; Nice, France; Clay – $50,000 – 32S/16D; One star Singles	(Sweden) Björn Borg; 6–4, 1–6, 6–2, 6–0	(Argentina) Guillermo Vilas	(Paraguay) Víctor Pecci (Hungary) Balázs Taróczy	(Chile) Belus Prajoux (France) François Jauffret (France) Christophe Casa (Chile) Hans Gildemeister
28 Mar	Nice International Championships; Nice, France; Clay – $50,000 – 32S/16D; One star Singles	(Romania) Ion Țiriac (Argentina) Guillermo Vilas; 6–4, 6–1	(Australia) Chris Kachel (New Zealand) Chris Lewis	(Paraguay) Víctor Pecci (Hungary) Balázs Taróczy	(Chile) Belus Prajoux (France) François Jauffret (France) Christophe Casa (Chile) Hans Gildemeister

=== April ===
Week	Tournament	Champions	Runners-up	Semifinalists	Quarterfinalists
11 Apr	Murcia Open; Murcia, Spain; Clay – $50,000 – 32S/16D; One star	(Spain) José Higueras; 6–4, 6–0, 6–3	(United Kingdom) Buster Mottram	(West Germany) Frank Gebert (Spain) Javier Soler	(France) François Jauffret (France) Patrice Dominguez (France) Jean-Louis Haillet (France) Patrick Proisy
11 Apr	Murcia Open; Murcia, Spain; Clay – $50,000 – 32S/16D; One star	(France) Patrice Dominguez (France) François Jauffret; 7–5, 6–2	(Chile) Patricio Cornejo (Chile) Hans Gildemeister	(West Germany) Frank Gebert (Spain) Javier Soler	(France) François Jauffret (France) Patrice Dominguez (France) Jean-Louis Haillet (France) Patrick Proisy
18 Apr	United Bank Classic; Denver, United States; Carpet – $100,000 – 32S/16D; Three star	(Sweden) Björn Borg; 7–5, 6–2	(United States) Brian Gottfried	(South Africa) Bob Hewitt (United States) James Delaney	(United States) Peter Fleming (Australia) Kim Warwick (South Africa) Colin Dibley (South Africa) Frew McMillan
18 Apr	United Bank Classic; Denver, United States; Carpet – $100,000 – 32S/16D; Three star	(Australia) Colin Dibley (Australia) Geoff Masters; 6–2, 6–3	(Australia) Syd Ball (Australia) Kim Warwick	(South Africa) Bob Hewitt (United States) James Delaney	(United States) Peter Fleming (Australia) Kim Warwick (South Africa) Colin Dibley (South Africa) Frew McMillan
25 Apr	Romika Cup; Munich, West Germany; Clay – 32S/16D; Two star	(Socialist Federal Republic of Yugoslavia) Željko Franulović; 6–1, 6–1, 6–7, 7–5	(Paraguay) Víctor Pecci	(Spain) José Higueras (Australia) Dick Crealy	(France) Patrick Proisy (Chile) Hans Gildemeister (Colombia) Iván Molina (Socialist Federal Republic of Yugoslavia) Nikola Pilić
25 Apr	Romika Cup; Munich, West Germany; Clay – 32S/16D; Two star	(Czechoslovakia) František Pála (Hungary) Balázs Taróczy; 6–3, 6–4	(Socialist Federal Republic of Yugoslavia) Nikola Špear (United States) John Whitlinger	(Spain) José Higueras (Australia) Dick Crealy	(France) Patrick Proisy (Chile) Hans Gildemeister (Colombia) Iván Molina (Socialist Federal Republic of Yugoslavia) Nikola Pilić

=== May ===
Week	Tournament	Champions	Runners-up	Semifinalists	Quarterfinalists
9 May	German Open; Hamburg, West Germany; Clay – $125,000 – 64S/32D; Four star	(Italy) Paolo Bertolucci; 6–3, 4–6, 6–2, 6–3	(Spain) Manuel Orantes	(United Kingdom) Buster Mottram (Chile) Jaime Fillol	(Argentina) Guillermo Vilas (Switzerland) Colin Dowdeswell (West Germany) Werner Zirngibl (South Africa) Bob Hewitt
9 May	German Open; Hamburg, West Germany; Clay – $125,000 – 64S/32D; Four star	(South Africa) Bob Hewitt (West Germany) Karl Meiler; 3–6, 6–3, 6–4, 6–4	(Australia) Phil Dent (Australia) Kim Warwick	(United Kingdom) Buster Mottram (Chile) Jaime Fillol	(Argentina) Guillermo Vilas (Switzerland) Colin Dowdeswell (West Germany) Werner Zirngibl (South Africa) Bob Hewitt
16 May	Italian Open; Rome, Italy; Clay – $131,250 – 64S/32D; Five star	(United States) Vitas Gerulaitis; 6–2, 7–6, 3–6, 7–6	(Italy) Antonio Zugarelli	(United States) Brian Gottfried (Australia) Phil Dent	(Italy) Adriano Panatta (Australia) Kim Warwick (Romania) Ilie Năstase (Paraguay) Víctor Pecci
16 May	Italian Open; Rome, Italy; Clay – $131,250 – 64S/32D; Five star	(United States) Brian Gottfried (Mexico) Raúl Ramírez; 6–7, 7–6, 7–5	(United States) Fred McNair (United States) Sherwood Stewart	(United States) Brian Gottfried (Australia) Phil Dent	(Italy) Adriano Panatta (Australia) Kim Warwick (Romania) Ilie Năstase (Paraguay) Víctor Pecci
16 May	Düsseldorf International; Düsseldorf, West Germany; Clay – 32S/16D; Two star	(Poland) Wojciech Fibak; 6–1, 5–7, 6–2	(South Africa) Raymond Moore	(West Germany) Jürgen Fassbender (United Kingdom) Buster Mottram	(Egypt) Ismail El Shafei (Chile) Jaime Fillol (United States) Jeff Borowiak (Colombia) Iván Molina
16 May	Düsseldorf International; Düsseldorf, West Germany; Clay – 32S/16D; Two star	(West Germany) Jürgen Fassbender (West Germany) Karl Meiler; 6–3, 6–3	(Australia) Paul Kronk (Australia) Cliff Letcher	(West Germany) Jürgen Fassbender (United Kingdom) Buster Mottram	(Egypt) Ismail El Shafei (Chile) Jaime Fillol (United States) Jeff Borowiak (Colombia) Iván Molina
23 May	French Open; Paris, France; Grand Slam; Clay – $300,000 – 128S/64D/24XD; Singles – Doubles – Mixed doubles	(Argentina) Guillermo Vilas; 6–0, 6–3, 6–0	(United States) Brian Gottfried	(Australia) Phil Dent (Mexico) Raúl Ramírez	(Romania) Ilie Năstase (Spain) José Higueras (Poland) Wojciech Fibak (Italy) Adriano Panatta
23 May	French Open; Paris, France; Grand Slam; Clay – $300,000 – 128S/64D/24XD; Singles – Doubles – Mixed doubles	(United States) Brian Gottfried (Mexico) Raúl Ramírez; 7–6, 4–6, 6–3, 6–4	(Poland) Wojciech Fibak (Czechoslovakia) Jan Kodeš	(Australia) Phil Dent (Mexico) Raúl Ramírez	(Romania) Ilie Năstase (Spain) José Higueras (Poland) Wojciech Fibak (Italy) Adriano Panatta
23 May	French Open; Paris, France; Grand Slam; Clay – $300,000 – 128S/64D/24XD; Singles – Doubles – Mixed doubles	(United States) Mary Carillo (United States) John McEnroe; 7–6, 6–3	(Romania) Florența Mihai (Colombia) Iván Molina	(Australia) Phil Dent (Mexico) Raúl Ramírez	(Romania) Ilie Năstase (Spain) José Higueras (Poland) Wojciech Fibak (Italy) Adriano Panatta

=== June ===
Week	Tournament	Champions	Runners-up	Semifinalists	Quarterfinalists
6 Jun	John Player Open; Nottingham, Great Britain; Grass – $100,000 – 64S/32D; Three star	No Winner	(United States) Tim Gullikson (Chile) Jaime Fillol	(United States) Roscoe Tanner (United States) Stan Smith	(United States) Bob Lutz (United States) Dick Stockton (Mexico) Raúl Ramírez (United States) Brian Gottfried
6 Jun	John Player Open; Nottingham, Great Britain; Grass – $100,000 – 64S/32D; Three star	Not completed.		(United States) Roscoe Tanner (United States) Stan Smith	(United States) Bob Lutz (United States) Dick Stockton (Mexico) Raúl Ramírez (United States) Brian Gottfried
6 Jun	Belgian International Championships; Brussels, Belgium; Clay – $75,000 – 48S/24D; Two star	(United States) Harold Solomon; 7–5, 3–6, 2–6, 6–3, 6–4	(West Germany) Karl Meiler	(Hungary) Balázs Taróczy (Socialist Federal Republic of Yugoslavia) Nikola Pilić	(France) Jean-François Caujolle (Socialist Federal Republic of Yugoslavia) Željko Franulović (Spain) Antonio Muñoz (West Germany) Jürgen Fassbender
6 Jun	Belgian International Championships; Brussels, Belgium; Clay – $75,000 – 48S/24D; Two star	Match abandoned – title shared. 2–6, 6–4, 2–2	(Socialist Federal Republic of Yugoslavia) Franulović / (Socialist Federal Republic of Yugoslavia) Pilić (Czechoslovakia) Pála / (Hungary) Taróczy	(Hungary) Balázs Taróczy (Socialist Federal Republic of Yugoslavia) Nikola Pilić	(France) Jean-François Caujolle (Socialist Federal Republic of Yugoslavia) Željko Franulović (Spain) Antonio Muñoz (West Germany) Jürgen Fassbender
13 Jun	Rawlings International; London, Great Britain; Grass – $100,000 – 64S/32D; Three star	(Mexico) Raúl Ramírez; 9–7, 7–5	(United Kingdom) Mark Cox	(United States) Brian Gottfried (United States) Hank Pfister	(United States) James Delaney (Italy) Adriano Panatta (United States) Roscoe Tanner (Australia) Colin Dibley
13 Jun	Rawlings International; London, Great Britain; Grass – $100,000 – 64S/32D; Three star	(India) Anand Amritraj (India) Vijay Amritraj; 6–1, 6–2	(United Kingdom) David Lloyd (United Kingdom) John Lloyd	(United States) Brian Gottfried (United States) Hank Pfister	(United States) James Delaney (Italy) Adriano Panatta (United States) Roscoe Tanner (Australia) Colin Dibley
13 Jun	Berlin Open; Berlin, West Germany; Clay – $50,000 – 32S/16D; One star	(Italy) Paolo Bertolucci; 6–4, 5–7, 4–6, 6–2, 6–4	(Czechoslovakia) Jiří Hřebec	(Paraguay) Víctor Pecci (United States) Steve Krulevitz	(West Germany) Jürgen Fassbender (France) François Jauffret (France) Patrick Proisy (Spain) José Higueras
13 Jun	Berlin Open; Berlin, West Germany; Clay – $50,000 – 32S/16D; One star	Not played – title shared.	(Chile) Gildemeister / (Chile) Prajoux (Czechoslovakia) Huťka / (Czechoslovakia) Zedník	(Paraguay) Víctor Pecci (United States) Steve Krulevitz	(West Germany) Jürgen Fassbender (France) François Jauffret (France) Patrick Proisy (Spain) José Higueras
20 Jun	Wimbledon Championships; London, England; Grand Slam; Grass – $198,645 – 128S/64D/48XD; Singles – Doubles – Mixed doubles	(Sweden) Björn Borg; 3–6, 6–2, 6–1, 5–7, 6–4	(United States) Jimmy Connors	(United States) John McEnroe (United States) Vitas Gerulaitis	(South Africa) Byron Bertram (Australia) Phil Dent (United States) Billy Martin (Romania) Ilie Năstase
20 Jun	Wimbledon Championships; London, England; Grand Slam; Grass – $198,645 – 128S/64D/48XD; Singles – Doubles – Mixed doubles	(Australia) Ross Case (Australia) Geoff Masters; 6–3, 6–4, 3–6, 8–9^{(4–7)}, 6–4	(Australia) John Alexander (Australia) Phil Dent	(United States) John McEnroe (United States) Vitas Gerulaitis	(South Africa) Byron Bertram (Australia) Phil Dent (United States) Billy Martin (Romania) Ilie Năstase
20 Jun	Wimbledon Championships; London, England; Grand Slam; Grass – $198,645 – 128S/64D/48XD; Singles – Doubles – Mixed doubles	(South Africa) Greer Stevens (South Africa) Bob Hewitt; 3–6, 7–5, 6–4	(Netherlands) Betty Stöve (South Africa) Frew McMillan	(United States) John McEnroe (United States) Vitas Gerulaitis	(South Africa) Byron Bertram (Australia) Phil Dent (United States) Billy Martin (Romania) Ilie Năstase

=== July ===
Week	Tournament	Champions	Runners-up	Semifinalists	Quarterfinalists
3 Jul	Swedish Open; Båstad, Sweden; Clay – $75,000 – 32S/16D; Two star	(Italy) Corrado Barazzutti; 7–6, 6–7, 6–2	(Hungary) Balázs Taróczy	(Italy) Antonio Zugarelli (Australia) Kim Warwick	(Poland) Wojciech Fibak (United Kingdom) Buster Mottram (Australia) Mark Edmondson (Socialist Federal Republic of Yugoslavia) Nikola Špear
3 Jul	Swedish Open; Båstad, Sweden; Clay – $75,000 – 32S/16D; Two star	(Australia) Mark Edmondson (Australia) John Marks; 6–4, 6–0	(France) Jean-Louis Haillet (France) François Jauffret	(Italy) Antonio Zugarelli (Australia) Kim Warwick	(Poland) Wojciech Fibak (United Kingdom) Buster Mottram (Australia) Mark Edmondson (Socialist Federal Republic of Yugoslavia) Nikola Špear
3 Jul	Swiss Open Championships; Gstaad, Switzerland; Clay – $75,000 – 32S/16D; Two star	(United States) Jeff Borowiak; 2–6, 6–1, 6–3	(France) Jean-François Caujolle	(West Germany) Frank Gebert (Czechoslovakia) Tomáš Šmíd	(West Germany) Jürgen Fassbender (Paraguay) Víctor Pecci (South Africa) David Schneider (Socialist Federal Republic of Yugoslavia) Željko Franulović
3 Jul	Swiss Open Championships; Gstaad, Switzerland; Clay – $75,000 – 32S/16D; Two star	(West Germany) Jürgen Fassbender (West Germany) Karl Meiler; 6–4, 7–6	(Rhodesia) Colin Dowdeswell (South Africa) Bob Hewitt	(West Germany) Frank Gebert (Czechoslovakia) Tomáš Šmíd	(West Germany) Jürgen Fassbender (Paraguay) Víctor Pecci (South Africa) David Schneider (Socialist Federal Republic of Yugoslavia) Željko Franulović
3 Jul	Miller Hall of Fame Championships; Newport, United States; Grass – $50,000 – 32S/16D; One star	(United States) Tim Gullikson; 6–4, 6–4, 5–7, 6–2	(United States) Hank Pfister	(Egypt) Ismail El Shafei (Rhodesia) Andrew Pattison	(Australia) John James (United States) Matt Mitchell (United States) Butch Seewagen (India) Anand Amritraj
3 Jul	Miller Hall of Fame Championships; Newport, United States; Grass – $50,000 – 32S/16D; One star	(Egypt) Ismail El Shafei (New Zealand) Brian Fairlie; 6–7, 6–3, 7–6	(United States) Tim Gullikson (United States) Tom Gullikson	(Egypt) Ismail El Shafei (Rhodesia) Andrew Pattison	(Australia) John James (United States) Matt Mitchell (United States) Butch Seewagen (India) Anand Amritraj
10 Jul	Western Championships; Cincinnati, United States; Clay – $100,000 – 64S/32D; Three star	(United States) Harold Solomon; 6–2, 6–3	(United Kingdom) Mark Cox	(Australia) John Alexander (United States) Rick Fagel	(United States) Terry Moor (Australia) John James (Egypt) Ismail El Shafei (United States) John McEnroe
10 Jul	Western Championships; Cincinnati, United States; Clay – $100,000 – 64S/32D; Three star	(Australia) John Alexander (Australia) Phil Dent; 6–3, 7–6	(South Africa) Bob Hewitt (United States) Roscoe Tanner	(Australia) John Alexander (United States) Rick Fagel	(United States) Terry Moor (Australia) John James (Egypt) Ismail El Shafei (United States) John McEnroe
10 Jul	Head Cup; Kitzbühel, Austria; Clay – $75,000 – 32S/16D; Two star	(Argentina) Guillermo Vilas; 5–7, 6–2, 4–6, 6–3, 6–2	(Czechoslovakia) Jan Kodeš	(Socialist Federal Republic of Yugoslavia) Željko Franulović (West Germany) Karl Meiler	(United Kingdom) Buster Mottram (United States) Bob Lutz (Hungary) János Benyik (Czechoslovakia) Tomáš Šmíd
10 Jul	Head Cup; Kitzbühel, Austria; Clay – $75,000 – 32S/16D; Two star	(United Kingdom) Buster Mottram (United Kingdom) Roger Taylor; 7–6, 6–4	(Rhodesia) Colin Dowdeswell (Australia) Chris Kachel	(Socialist Federal Republic of Yugoslavia) Željko Franulović (West Germany) Karl Meiler	(United Kingdom) Buster Mottram (United States) Bob Lutz (Hungary) János Benyik (Czechoslovakia) Tomáš Šmíd
10 Jul	Dutch Open; Hilversum, Netherlands; Clay – $75,000 – 32S/16D; Two star	(France) Patrick Proisy; 6–0, 6–2, 6–0	(Argentina) Lito Álvarez	(Australia) Colin Dibley (New Zealand) Onny Parun	(Spain) José Higueras (Australia) Kim Warwick (France) François Jauffret (Netherlands) Louk Sanders
10 Jul	Dutch Open; Hilversum, Netherlands; Clay – $75,000 – 32S/16D; Two star	(Spain) José Higueras (Spain) Antonio Muñoz; 6–1, 6–4, 2–6, 6–1	(France) Jean-Louis Haillet (France) François Jauffret	(Australia) Colin Dibley (New Zealand) Onny Parun	(Spain) José Higueras (Australia) Kim Warwick (France) François Jauffret (Netherlands) Louk Sanders
17 Jul	Washington Star International; Washington, United States; Clay – $125,000 – 64S/32D; Four star	(Argentina) Guillermo Vilas; 6–4, 7–5	(United States) Brian Gottfried	(United States) Eddie Dibbs (United States) Harold Solomon	(Argentina) Ricardo Cano (Chile) Hans Gildemeister (Australia) John Alexander (South Africa) Raymond Moore
17 Jul	Washington Star International; Washington, United States; Clay – $125,000 – 64S/32D; Four star	(Australia) John Alexander (Australia) Phil Dent; 7–5, 7–5	(United States) Fred McNair (United States) Sherwood Stewart	(United States) Eddie Dibbs (United States) Harold Solomon	(Argentina) Ricardo Cano (Chile) Hans Gildemeister (Australia) John Alexander (South Africa) Raymond Moore
24 Jul	Louisville International; Louisville, United States; Clay – $125,000 – 64S/32D; Four star	(Argentina) Guillermo Vilas; 1–6, 6–0, 6–1	(United States) Eddie Dibbs	(Australia) Phil Dent (Chile) Hans Gildemeister	(Romania) Ion Țiriac (United States) Dick Stockton (Paraguay) Víctor Pecci (South Africa) Bernard Mitton
24 Jul	Louisville International; Louisville, United States; Clay – $125,000 – 64S/32D; Four star	(Australia) John Alexander (Australia) Phil Dent; 6–1, 6–4	(Australia) Chris Kachel (Australia) Cliff Letcher	(Australia) Phil Dent (Chile) Hans Gildemeister	(Romania) Ion Țiriac (United States) Dick Stockton (Paraguay) Víctor Pecci (South Africa) Bernard Mitton
31 Jul	Volvo International; North Conway, United States; Clay – $125,000 – 64S/32D; Four star Singles – Doubles	(Australia) John Alexander; 2–6, 6–4, 6–4	(Spain) Manuel Orantes	(United States) Harold Solomon (United States) Eddie Dibbs	(United States) Jimmy Connors (United States) Steve Krulevitz (Australia) Ken Rosewall (United States) Brian Gottfried
31 Jul	Volvo International; North Conway, United States; Clay – $125,000 – 64S/32D; Four star Singles – Doubles	(United States) Brian Gottfried (Mexico) Raúl Ramírez; 7–5, 6–3	(United States) Fred McNair (United States) Sherwood Stewart	(United States) Harold Solomon (United States) Eddie Dibbs	(United States) Jimmy Connors (United States) Steve Krulevitz (Australia) Ken Rosewall (United States) Brian Gottfried
31 Jul	Mutual Benefit Life Open; South Orange, United States; Clay – $75,000 – 32S/16D; Two star	(Argentina) Guillermo Vilas; 6–4, 6–1	(United States) Roscoe Tanner	(United States) John McEnroe (South Africa) Raymond Moore	(United States) Jeff Borowiak (Chile) Jaime Fillol (South Africa) Bernard Mitton (Socialist Federal Republic of Yugoslavia) Željko Franulović
31 Jul	Mutual Benefit Life Open; South Orange, United States; Clay – $75,000 – 32S/16D; Two star	(Australia) Colin Dibley (Poland) Wojciech Fibak; 6–1, 7–5	(Romania) Ion Țiriac (Argentina) Guillermo Vilas	(United States) John McEnroe (South Africa) Raymond Moore	(United States) Jeff Borowiak (Chile) Jaime Fillol (South Africa) Bernard Mitton (Socialist Federal Republic of Yugoslavia) Željko Franulović

=== August ===
Week	Tournament	Champions	Runners-up	Semifinalists	Quarterfinalists
7 Aug	Wendy's Tennis Classic; Columbus, United States; Clay – $125,000 – 64S/32D; Four star	(Argentina) Guillermo Vilas; 6–2, 6–1	(United States) Brian Gottfried	(Mexico) Raúl Ramírez (United States) Billy Martin	(United States) Bob Lutz (United States) Jeff Borowiak (United States) Sherwood Stewart (United States) Tim Gullikson
7 Aug	Wendy's Tennis Classic; Columbus, United States; Clay – $125,000 – 64S/32D; Four star	(United States) Bob Lutz (United States) Stan Smith; 4–6, 7–5, 6–2	(United States) Peter Fleming (United States) Gene Mayer	(Mexico) Raúl Ramírez (United States) Billy Martin	(United States) Bob Lutz (United States) Jeff Borowiak (United States) Sherwood Stewart (United States) Tim Gullikson
7 Aug	U.S. Clay Court Championships; Indianapolis, United States; Clay – $125,000 – 64S/32D; Four star	(Spain) Manuel Orantes; 6–1, 6–3	(United States) Jimmy Connors	(United States) Phil Dent (Hungary) Balázs Taróczy	(United States) Dick Stockton (United States) John McEnroe (United States) Harold Solomon (United States) Terry Moor
7 Aug	U.S. Clay Court Championships; Indianapolis, United States; Clay – $125,000 – 64S/32D; Four star	(Chile) Patricio Cornejo (Chile) Jaime Fillol; 6–7, 6–4, 6–3	(Australia) Dick Crealy (Australia) Cliff Letcher	(United States) Phil Dent (Hungary) Balázs Taróczy	(United States) Dick Stockton (United States) John McEnroe (United States) Harold Solomon (United States) Terry Moor
14 Aug	Rothmans Canadian Open; Toronto, Ontario, Canada; Clay – $125,000 – 64S/32D; Four star	(United States) Jeff Borowiak; 6–0, 6–1	(Chile) Jaime Fillol	(Australia) John Alexander (Australia) Phil Dent	(Australia) Colin Dibley (Argentina) Ricardo Cano (United Kingdom) Buster Mottram (Spain) Manuel Orantes
14 Aug	Rothmans Canadian Open; Toronto, Ontario, Canada; Clay – $125,000 – 64S/32D; Four star	(South Africa) Bob Hewitt (Mexico) Raúl Ramírez; 6–4, 3–6, 6–2	(United States) Fred McNair (United States) Sherwood Stewart	(Australia) John Alexander (Australia) Phil Dent	(Australia) Colin Dibley (Argentina) Ricardo Cano (United Kingdom) Buster Mottram (Spain) Manuel Orantes
21 Aug	U.S. Professional Tennis Championships; Boston, United States; Clay – $125,000 – 64S/32D; Four star	(Spain) Manuel Orantes; 7–6, 7–5, 6–4	(United States) Eddie Dibbs	(Poland) Wojciech Fibak (Chile) Jaime Fillol	(United States) Jimmy Connors (United States) Dick Stockton (Colombia) Iván Molina (Chile) Patricio Cornejo
21 Aug	U.S. Professional Tennis Championships; Boston, United States; Clay – $125,000 – 64S/32D; Four star	(United States) Bob Lutz (United States) Stan Smith; 6–3, 6–4	(United States) Brian Gottfried (South Africa) Bob Hewitt	(Poland) Wojciech Fibak (Chile) Jaime Fillol	(United States) Jimmy Connors (United States) Dick Stockton (Colombia) Iván Molina (Chile) Patricio Cornejo
29 Aug	US Open; New York City, United States; Grand Slam; Clay – $250,000 – 128S/64D/32XD; Singles – Doubles – Mixed doubles	(Argentina) Guillermo Vilas; 2–6, 6–3, 7–6^{(7–4)}, 6–0	(United States) Jimmy Connors	(United States) Harold Solomon (Italy) Corrado Barazzutti	(United States) Dick Stockton (South Africa) Raymond Moore (United States) Brian Gottfried (Spain) Manuel Orantes
29 Aug	US Open; New York City, United States; Grand Slam; Clay – $250,000 – 128S/64D/32XD; Singles – Doubles – Mixed doubles	(South Africa) Bob Hewitt (South Africa) Frew McMillan; 6–4, 6–0	(United States) Brian Gottfried (Mexico) Raúl Ramírez	(United States) Harold Solomon (Italy) Corrado Barazzutti	(United States) Dick Stockton (South Africa) Raymond Moore (United States) Brian Gottfried (Spain) Manuel Orantes
29 Aug	US Open; New York City, United States; Grand Slam; Clay – $250,000 – 128S/64D/32XD; Singles – Doubles – Mixed doubles	(Netherlands) Betty Stöve (South Africa) Frew McMillan; 6–2, 3–6, 6–3	(United States) Billie Jean King (United States) Vitas Gerulaitis	(United States) Harold Solomon (Italy) Corrado Barazzutti	(United States) Dick Stockton (South Africa) Raymond Moore (United States) Brian Gottfried (Spain) Manuel Orantes

=== September ===
Week	Tournament	Champions	Runners-up	Semifinalists	Quarterfinalists
12 Sep	Woodlands Doubles; Woodlands, Texas, US; Hard – $125,000 – D32	(United States) Marty Riessen (Netherlands) Tom Okker; 3–6, 6–3, 6–3, 4–6, 6–1	(United States) Tim Gullikson (United States) Tom Gullikson	(South Africa) Hewitt / (South Africa) McMillan (United States) Lutz / (United States) Smith	(United States) McNair / (United States) Stewart (United States) Mayer / (South Africa) Menon (Chile) Fillol / (Chile) Fillol (United States) Davidson / (Australia) Stolle
19 Sep	Southern California Championships; Los Angeles, US; Hard – $100,000 – 64S/32D; Four star	(Mexico) Raúl Ramírez; 7–5, 3–6, 6–4	(United States) Brian Gottfried	(United States) Eddie Dibbs (Spain) Manuel Orantes	(South Africa) Sashi Menon (South Africa) Cliff Drysdale (United States) Eliot Teltscher (United States) Tom Leonard
19 Sep	Southern California Championships; Los Angeles, US; Hard – $100,000 – 64S/32D; Four star	(South Africa) Frew McMillan (United States) Sandy Mayer; 6–2, 6–3	(United States) Tom Leonard (United States) Mike Machette	(United States) Eddie Dibbs (Spain) Manuel Orantes	(South Africa) Sashi Menon (South Africa) Cliff Drysdale (United States) Eliot Teltscher (United States) Tom Leonard
19 Sep	Coupe Porée; Paris, France; Clay – $50,000 – 32S/16D; One star	(Argentina) Guillermo Vilas; 6–2, 6–1, 7–6	(France) Christophe Roger-Vasselin	(France) Patrick Proisy (Spain) José Higueras	(Chile) Hans Gildemeister (Italy) Paolo Bertolucci (Italy) Corrado Barazzutti (France) Georges Goven
19 Sep	Coupe Porée; Paris, France; Clay – $50,000 – 32S/16D; One star	(France) Jacques Thamin (France) Christophe Roger-Vasselin; 6–2, 4–6, 6–3	(Romania) Ilie Năstase (Romania) Ion Țiriac	(France) Patrick Proisy (Spain) José Higueras	(Chile) Hans Gildemeister (Italy) Paolo Bertolucci (Italy) Corrado Barazzutti (France) Georges Goven
26 Sep	Raquette d'Or; Aix-en-Provence, France; Clay – $50,000 – 32S/16D; One star	(Romania) Ilie Năstase; 6–1, 7–5, ret.	(Argentina) Guillermo Vilas	(France) Éric Deblicker (France) Georges Goven	(Spain) José Higueras (Italy) Antonio Zugarelli (Chile) Hans Gildemeister (Socialist Federal Republic of Yugoslavia) Željko Franulović
26 Sep	Raquette d'Or; Aix-en-Provence, France; Clay – $50,000 – 32S/16D; One star	(Romania) Ilie Năstase (Romania) Ion Țiriac; 1–6, 7–5, 6–3, 6–3	(France) Patrice Dominguez (Sweden) Rolf Norberg	(France) Éric Deblicker (France) Georges Goven	(Spain) José Higueras (Italy) Antonio Zugarelli (Chile) Hans Gildemeister (Socialist Federal Republic of Yugoslavia) Željko Franulović
26 Sep	Transamerica Championships; San Francisco, California, US; Carpet – $125,000 – 64S/32D; Four star	(United States) Butch Walts; 4–6, 6–3, 7–5	(United States) Brian Gottfried	(United States) Dick Stockton (United States) Peter Fleming	(United States) Marty Riessen (United States) Robert Lutz (United States) Harold Solomon (United States) John McEnroe
26 Sep	Transamerica Championships; San Francisco, California, US; Carpet – $125,000 – 64S/32D; Four star	(United States) Dick Stockton (United States) Marty Riessen; 6–4, 1–6, 6–4	(United States) Fred McNair (United States) Sherwood Stewart	(United States) Dick Stockton (United States) Peter Fleming	(United States) Marty Riessen (United States) Robert Lutz (United States) Harold Solomon (United States) John McEnroe

=== October ===
Week	Tournament	Champions	Runners-up	Semifinalists	Quarterfinalists
3 Oct	Island Holidays Tennis Classic; Maui, Hawaii, US; Hard – $100,000 – 32S/16D; Three star	(United States) Jimmy Connors; 6–2, 6–0	(United States) Brian Gottfried	(Mexico) Raúl Ramírez (United Kingdom) John Lloyd	(United States) Harold Solomon (United States) Sandy Mayer (Sweden) Douglas Palm (United States) Stan Smith
3 Oct	Island Holidays Tennis Classic; Maui, Hawaii, US; Hard – $100,000 – 32S/16D; Three star	(United States) Stan Smith (United States) Robert Lutz; 7–6, 6–4	(United States) Brian Gottfried (Mexico) Raúl Ramírez	(Mexico) Raúl Ramírez (United Kingdom) John Lloyd	(United States) Harold Solomon (United States) Sandy Mayer (Sweden) Douglas Palm (United States) Stan Smith
3 Oct	Aryamehr Cup; Tehran, Iran; Clay – $150,000 – 64S/32D; Five star	(Argentina) Guillermo Vilas; 6–2, 6–4, 1–6, 6–1	(United States) Eddie Dibbs	(Poland) Wojciech Fibak (Spain) Manuel Orantes	(United Kingdom) Buster Mottram (Chile) Hans Gildemeister (Australia) Paul McNamee (United States) Mike Fishbach
3 Oct	Aryamehr Cup; Tehran, Iran; Clay – $150,000 – 64S/32D; Five star	(Argentina) Guillermo Vilas (Romania) Ion Țiriac; 1–6, 6–1, 6–4	(South Africa) Bob Hewitt (South Africa) Frew McMillan	(Poland) Wojciech Fibak (Spain) Manuel Orantes	(United Kingdom) Buster Mottram (Chile) Hans Gildemeister (Australia) Paul McNamee (United States) Mike Fishbach
10 Oct	South Pacific Classic; Brisbane, Australia; Grass – $50,000 – 32S/16D; One star	(United States) Vitas Gerulaitis; 6–7^{(2–7)}, 6–1, 6–1, 7–5	(Australia) Tony Roche	(United States) Hank Pfister (Australia) Ken Rosewall	(United States) Nick Saviano (United States) Bill Scanlon (Australia) Kim Warwick (West Germany) Jürgen Fassbender
10 Oct	South Pacific Classic; Brisbane, Australia; Grass – $50,000 – 32S/16D; One star	(United States) Bill Scanlon (United States) Vitas Gerulaitis; 7–6, 6–4	(Australia) Mal Anderson (Australia) Ken Rosewall	(United States) Hank Pfister (Australia) Ken Rosewall	(United States) Nick Saviano (United States) Bill Scanlon (Australia) Kim Warwick (West Germany) Jürgen Fassbender
10 Oct	Il Trofeo Gillette; Madrid, Spain; Clay – $100,000 – 64S/32D; Three star	(Sweden) Björn Borg; 6–3, 6–0, 6–7, 7–6	(Chile) Jaime Fillol	(Italy) Paolo Bertolucci (United States) Eddie Dibbs	(Czechoslovakia) Tomáš Šmíd (Spain) Manuel Orantes (Poland) Wojciech Fibak (Spain) José Higueras
10 Oct	Il Trofeo Gillette; Madrid, Spain; Clay – $100,000 – 64S/32D; Three star	(South Africa) Frew McMillan (South Africa) Bob Hewitt; 6–7, 7–6, 6–3, 6–1	(Spain) Antonio Muñoz (Spain) Manuel Orantes	(Italy) Paolo Bertolucci (United States) Eddie Dibbs	(Czechoslovakia) Tomáš Šmíd (Spain) Manuel Orantes (Poland) Wojciech Fibak (Spain) José Higueras
17 Oct	Torneo Godó; Barcelona, Spain; Clay – 64S/32D; Three star	(Sweden) Björn Borg; 6–2, 7–5, 6–2	(Spain) Manuel Orantes	(United States) Eddie Dibbs (Poland) Wojciech Fibak	(Spain) José Higueras (Italy) Paolo Bertolucci (Hungary) Balázs Taróczy (Czechoslovakia) Jiří Granat
17 Oct	Torneo Godó; Barcelona, Spain; Clay – 64S/32D; Three star	(Czechoslovakia) Jan Kodeš (Poland) Wojciech Fibak; 6–0, 6–4	(South Africa) Bob Hewitt (South Africa) Frew McMillan	(United States) Eddie Dibbs (Poland) Wojciech Fibak	(Spain) José Higueras (Italy) Paolo Bertolucci (Hungary) Balázs Taróczy (Czechoslovakia) Jiří Granat
17 Oct	Australian Indoor Championships; Sydney, Australia; Hard – $125,000 – 32S/16D; Four star Singles – Doubles	(United States) Jimmy Connors; 7–5, 6–4, 6–2	(Australia) Ken Rosewall	(United States) Nick Saviano (United States) Vitas Gerulaitis	(Australia) Tony Roche (Australia) Colin Dibley (United States) Hank Pfister (Australia) Phil Dent
17 Oct	Australian Indoor Championships; Sydney, Australia; Hard – $125,000 – 32S/16D; Four star Singles – Doubles	(Australia) Tony Roche (Australia) John Newcombe; 6–7, 6–3, 6–1	(Australia) Ross Case (Australia) Geoff Masters	(United States) Nick Saviano (United States) Vitas Gerulaitis	(Australia) Tony Roche (Australia) Colin Dibley (United States) Hank Pfister (Australia) Phil Dent
24 Oct	Hitachi West Coast Classic; Perth, Australia; Hard – $50,000 – 32S/16D; One star	(United States) Vitas Gerulaitis; 6–3, 6–4, 6–2	(Australia) Geoff Masters	(United States) Hank Pfister (Australia) Tony Roche	(United Kingdom) Richard Lewis (United States) Tim Wilkison (United States) Harold Solomon (Czechoslovakia) Jiří Hřebec
24 Oct	Hitachi West Coast Classic; Perth, Australia; Hard – $50,000 – 32S/16D; One star	(Australia) Allan Stone (Australia) Ray Ruffels; 6–2, 6–1	(United States) Nick Saviano (United States) John Whitlinger	(United States) Hank Pfister (Australia) Tony Roche	(United Kingdom) Richard Lewis (United States) Tim Wilkison (United States) Harold Solomon (Czechoslovakia) Jiří Hřebec
24 Oct	Fischer-Grand Prix; Vienna, Austria; Hard – $50,000 – 32S/16D; One star Singles – Doubles	(United States) Brian Gottfried; 6–1, 6–1	(Poland) Wojciech Fibak	(United States) Sandy Mayer (Austria) Hans Kary	(Czechoslovakia) Tomáš Šmíd (Hungary) Balázs Taróczy (South Africa) Byron Bertram (South Africa) Bob Hewitt
24 Oct	Fischer-Grand Prix; Vienna, Austria; Hard – $50,000 – 32S/16D; One star Singles – Doubles	(South Africa) Bob Hewitt (South Africa) Frew McMillan; 6–4, 6–3	(Poland) Wojciech Fibak (Czechoslovakia) Jan Kodeš	(United States) Sandy Mayer (Austria) Hans Kary	(Czechoslovakia) Tomáš Šmíd (Hungary) Balázs Taróczy (South Africa) Byron Bertram (South Africa) Bob Hewitt
24 Oct	Swiss Indoor Championships; Basel, Switzerland; Carpet – $50,000 – 32S/16D; One star	(Sweden) Björn Borg; 6–2, 7–5, 6–2	(United Kingdom) John Lloyd	(United States) Erik van Dillen (Chile) Jaime Fillol	(Switzerland) Heinz Günthardt (United States) Jeff Borowiak (Chile) Álvaro Fillol (United Kingdom) Mark Cox
24 Oct	Swiss Indoor Championships; Basel, Switzerland; Carpet – $50,000 – 32S/16D; One star	(United Kingdom) Buster Mottram (United Kingdom) Mark Cox; 7–5, 6–4, 6–3	(United Kingdom) John Feaver (Australia) John James	(United States) Erik van Dillen (Chile) Jaime Fillol	(Switzerland) Heinz Günthardt (United States) Jeff Borowiak (Chile) Álvaro Fillol (United Kingdom) Mark Cox
31 Oct	Cologne Cup; Cologne, Germany; Carpet – $50,000 – 32S/16D; One star	(Sweden) Björn Borg; 2–6, 7–5, 6–3	(Poland) Wojciech Fibak	(Hungary) Balázs Taróczy (United Kingdom) Buster Mottram	(United States) Billy Martin (United States) Sandy Mayer (Sweden) Tenny Svensson (Austria) Hans Kary
31 Oct	Cologne Cup; Cologne, Germany; Carpet – $50,000 – 32S/16D; One star	(South Africa) Bob Hewitt (South Africa) Frew McMillan; 6–3, 7–5	(United States) Fred McNair (United States) Sherwood Stewart	(Hungary) Balázs Taróczy (United Kingdom) Buster Mottram	(United States) Billy Martin (United States) Sandy Mayer (Sweden) Tenny Svensson (Austria) Hans Kary
31 Oct	Jean Becker Open; Paris, France; Hard – $50,000 – 32S/16D; One star	(Italy) Corrado Barazzutti; 7–6, 7–6, 6–7, 3–6, 6–4	(United States) Brian Gottfried	(United Kingdom) Mark Cox (United States) Jeff Borowiak	(United States) Robert Lutz (France) Pierre Barthès (United States) Chris Sylvan (South Africa) Byron Bertram
31 Oct	Jean Becker Open; Paris, France; Hard – $50,000 – 32S/16D; One star	(Mexico) Raúl Ramírez (United States) Brian Gottfried; 6–2, 6–0	(United States) Jeff Borowiak (United Kingdom) Roger Taylor	(United Kingdom) Mark Cox (United States) Jeff Borowiak	(United States) Robert Lutz (France) Pierre Barthès (United States) Chris Sylvan (South Africa) Byron Bertram
31 Oct	Fred Perry Japan Open; Tokyo, Japan; Clay – 64S/32D; Three star	(Spain) Manuel Orantes; 6–2, 6–1	(Australia) Kim Warwick	(United States) Harold Solomon (United States) Tim Gullikson	(Australia) Colin Dibley (United States) Stan Smith (United States) Roscoe Tanner (Czechoslovakia) Vladimír Zedník
31 Oct	Fred Perry Japan Open; Tokyo, Japan; Clay – 64S/32D; Three star	(Australia) Kim Warwick (Australia) Geoff Masters; 6–2, 7–6	(Australia) Colin Dibley (Australia) Chris Kachel	(United States) Harold Solomon (United States) Tim Gullikson	(Australia) Colin Dibley (United States) Stan Smith (United States) Roscoe Tanner (Czechoslovakia) Vladimír Zedník

=== November ===
Week	Tournament	Champions	Runners-up	Semifinalists	Quarterfinalists
7 Nov	Stockholm Open; Stockholm, Sweden; Hard – $150,000 – 64S/32D; Five star Singles – Doubles	(United States) Sandy Mayer; 6–2, 6–4	(South Africa) Raymond Moore	(United States) Stan Smith (Poland) Wojciech Fibak	(United States) Harold Solomon (United States) George Hardie (Sweden) Kjell Johansson (United States) Brian Teacher
7 Nov	Stockholm Open; Stockholm, Sweden; Hard – $150,000 – 64S/32D; Five star Singles – Doubles	(Netherlands) Tom Okker (Poland) Wojciech Fibak; 6–3, 6–3	(United States) Brian Gottfried (Mexico) Raúl Ramírez	(United States) Stan Smith (Poland) Wojciech Fibak	(United States) Harold Solomon (United States) George Hardie (Sweden) Kjell Johansson (United States) Brian Teacher
7 Nov	Orient Cup; Bogotá, Colombia; Clay (i) – $50,000 – 32S/16D; One star	(Argentina) Guillermo Vilas; 6–1, 6–2, 6–3	(Spain) José Higueras	(Paraguay) Víctor Pecci (Brazil) Carlos Kirmayr	(Bolivia) Ramiro Benavides (Chile) Hans Gildemeister (United States) Mike Fishbach (France) Patrick Proisy
7 Nov	Orient Cup; Bogotá, Colombia; Clay (i) – $50,000 – 32S/16D; One star	(Chile) Belus Prajoux (Chile) Hans Gildemeister; 6–4, 6–2	(Venezuela) Jorge Andrew (Brazil) Carlos Kirmayr	(Paraguay) Víctor Pecci (Brazil) Carlos Kirmayr	(Bolivia) Ramiro Benavides (Chile) Hans Gildemeister (United States) Mike Fishbach (France) Patrick Proisy
7 Nov	Colgate Tennis Patrons Classic; Hong Kong; Hard – $75,000 – 32S/16D; Two star Singles – Doubles	(Australia) Ken Rosewall; 6–3, 5–7, 6–4, 6–4	(United States) Tom Gorman	(West Germany) Karl Meiler (United States) Pat DuPré	(United States) Nick Saviano (United States) Mike Cahill (Australia) Allan Stone (United States) Dick Stockton
7 Nov	Colgate Tennis Patrons Classic; Hong Kong; Hard – $75,000 – 32S/16D; Two star Singles – Doubles	(Australia) Kim Warwick (Australia) Syd Ball; 7–6, 6–3	(United States) Marty Riessen (United States) Roscoe Tanner	(West Germany) Karl Meiler (United States) Pat DuPré	(United States) Nick Saviano (United States) Mike Cahill (Australia) Allan Stone (United States) Dick Stockton
14 Nov	Philta International; Manila, Philippines; Clay – $75,000 – 32S/16D; Two star	(West Germany) Karl Meiler; Walkover	(Spain) Manuel Orantes	(Australia) Dick Crealy (Australia) Geoff Masters	(Netherlands) Louk Sanders (United States) Tim Wilkison (United States) Tom Gullikson (United States) Tim Gullikson
14 Nov	Philta International; Manila, Philippines; Clay – $75,000 – 32S/16D; Two star	(Australia) John Marks (Australia) Chris Kachel; 4–6, 6–0, 7–6	(United States) Mike Cahill (United States) Terry Moor	(Australia) Dick Crealy (Australia) Geoff Masters	(Netherlands) Louk Sanders (United States) Tim Wilkison (United States) Tom Gullikson (United States) Tim Gullikson
14 Nov	Chilean International; Santiago, Chile; Clay – $50,000 – 32S/16D; One star	(Argentina) Guillermo Vilas; 6–0, 2–6, 6–4	(Chile) Jaime Fillol	(Ecuador) Ricardo Ycaza (Paraguay) Víctor Pecci	(United States) Gene Mayer (Colombia) Álvaro Betancur (Chile) Patricio Cornejo (Chile) Belus Prajoux
14 Nov	Chilean International; Santiago, Chile; Clay – $50,000 – 32S/16D; One star	(Chile) Jaime Fillol (Chile) Patricio Cornejo; 5–7, 6–1, 6–1	(United States) Henry Bunis (Australia) Paul McNamee	(Ecuador) Ricardo Ycaza (Paraguay) Víctor Pecci	(United States) Gene Mayer (Colombia) Álvaro Betancur (Chile) Patricio Cornejo (Chile) Belus Prajoux
14 Nov	Wembley Championships; London, England; Hard – $125,000 – 32S/16D; Four star	(Sweden) Björn Borg; 6–4, 6–4, 6–3	(United Kingdom) John Lloyd	(United States) Eddie Dibbs (Mexico) Raúl Ramírez	(Australia) Raymond Moore (Poland) Wojciech Fibak (Netherlands) Tom Okker (United States) Brian Gottfried
14 Nov	Wembley Championships; London, England; Hard – $125,000 – 32S/16D; Four star	(South Africa) Frew McMillan (United States) Sandy Mayer; 6–3, 7–6	(United States) Brian Gottfried (Mexico) Raúl Ramírez	(United States) Eddie Dibbs (Mexico) Raúl Ramírez	(Australia) Raymond Moore (Poland) Wojciech Fibak (Netherlands) Tom Okker (United States) Brian Gottfried
21 Nov	Argentine Championships; Buenos Aires, Argentina; Clay – $75,000 – 32S/16D; Two star	(Argentina) Guillermo Vilas; 6–2, 7–5, 3–6, 6–3	(Chile) Jaime Fillol	(Chile) Hans Gildemeister (Paraguay) Víctor Pecci	(Chile) Belus Prajoux (United States) Mike Fishbach (United States) Gene Mayer (Chile) Patricio Cornejo
21 Nov	Argentine Championships; Buenos Aires, Argentina; Clay – $75,000 – 32S/16D; Two star	(Argentina) Guillermo Vilas (Romania) Ion Țiriac; 6–4, 6–0	(Argentina) Ricardo Cano (Spain) Antonio Muñoz	(Chile) Hans Gildemeister (Paraguay) Víctor Pecci	(Chile) Belus Prajoux (United States) Mike Fishbach (United States) Gene Mayer (Chile) Patricio Cornejo
21 Nov	Grand Prix Masaveu de Asturias; Oviedo, Spain; Hard – $100,000 – 64S/32D; Three star	(United States) Eddie Dibbs; 6–4, 6–1	(Mexico) Raúl Ramírez	(United States) Peter Fleming (Czechoslovakia) Jan Kodeš	(United States) Sherwood Stewart (Czechoslovakia) Jiří Granát (United Kingdom) Mark Cox (United States) Fred McNair
21 Nov	Grand Prix Masaveu de Asturias; Oviedo, Spain; Hard – $100,000 – 64S/32D; Three star	(United States) Sherwood Stewart (United States) Fred McNair; 6–3, 6–1	(Czechoslovakia) Jan Kodeš (Mexico) Raúl Ramírez	(United States) Peter Fleming (Czechoslovakia) Jan Kodeš	(United States) Sherwood Stewart (Czechoslovakia) Jiří Granát (United Kingdom) Mark Cox (United States) Fred McNair
21 Nov	Taipei Summit Open; Taipei, Taiwan; Carpet – $50,000 – 32S/16D; One star	(United States) Tim Gullikson; 6–7, 7–5, 7–6, 6–4	(Egypt) Ismail El Shafei	(Australia) Geoff Masters (United Kingdom) Richard Lewis	(United States) Terry Moor (United States) John Whitlinger (West Germany) Karl Meiler (Australia) Steve Docherty
21 Nov	Taipei Summit Open; Taipei, Taiwan; Carpet – $50,000 – 32S/16D; One star	(United States) Chris Delaney (United States) Pat DuPré; 7–6, 7–6	(Australia) Steve Docherty (United States) Tom Gorman	(Australia) Geoff Masters (United Kingdom) Richard Lewis	(United States) Terry Moor (United States) John Whitlinger (West Germany) Karl Meiler (Australia) Steve Docherty
28 Nov	Indian Championships; Bombay, India; Clay – $50,000 – 32S/16D; One star	(India) Vijay Amritraj; 6–4, 6–1	(United States) Terry Moor	(United States) Tom Gullikson (France) Christophe Freyss	(India) Anand Amritraj (United Kingdom) Richard Lewis (United States) Mike Cahill (United Kingdom) John Feaver
28 Nov	Indian Championships; Bombay, India; Clay – $50,000 – 32S/16D; One star	(United States) Terry Moor (United States) Mike Cahill; 6–7, 6–4, 6–4	(Mexico) Marcelo Lara (India) Jasjit Singh	(United States) Tom Gullikson (France) Christophe Freyss	(India) Anand Amritraj (United Kingdom) Richard Lewis (United States) Mike Cahill (United Kingdom) John Feaver
28 Nov	South African Open; Johannesburg, South Africa; Hard – $150,000 – 32S/16D; Five star	(Argentina) Guillermo Vilas; 7–6, 6–3, 6–4	(United Kingdom) Buster Mottram	(United States) Stan Smith (South Africa) Frew McMillan	(United States) Peter Fleming (South Africa) Danny Sullivan (United States) Sherwood Stewart (United States) Eddie Dibbs
28 Nov	South African Open; Johannesburg, South Africa; Hard – $150,000 – 32S/16D; Five star	(United States) Stan Smith (United States) Robert Lutz; 6–3, 7–5, 6–7, 7–6	(United States) Peter Fleming (South Africa) Raymond Moore	(United States) Stan Smith (South Africa) Frew McMillan	(United States) Peter Fleming (South Africa) Danny Sullivan (United States) Sherwood Stewart (United States) Eddie Dibbs

=== December ===
Week	Tournament	Champions	Runners-up	Semifinalists	Quarterfinalists
5 Dec	Marlboro South Australia Men's Classic; Adelaide, Australia; Grass – $100,000 – 64S/32D; Three star	(United States) Tim Gullikson; 3–6, 6–4, 3–6, 6–2, 6–4	(New Zealand) Chris Lewis	(Australia) Kim Warwick (United States) Tom Gorman	(United States) Bill Scanlon (Australia) Phil Dent (Australia) John Alexander (Australia) Allan Stone
5 Dec	Marlboro South Australia Men's Classic; Adelaide, Australia; Grass – $100,000 – 64S/32D; Three star	(Australia) Kim Warwick (Australia) Syd Ball; 3–6, 7–6, 6–4	(Australia) John Alexander (Australia) Phil Dent	(Australia) Kim Warwick (United States) Tom Gorman	(United States) Bill Scanlon (Australia) Phil Dent (Australia) John Alexander (Australia) Allan Stone
12 Dec	Marlboro New South Wales Championships; Sydney, Australia; Grass – $175,000 – 64S/32D; Four star	(United States) Roscoe Tanner; 6–3, 3–6, 6–3, 6–7, 6–4	(United States) Brian Teacher	(United States) Vitas Gerulaitis (Australia) Cliff Letcher	(Australia) Phil Dent (United States) Bill Scanlon (Australia) Colin Dibley (United States) Butch Walts
12 Dec	Marlboro New South Wales Championships; Sydney, Australia; Grass – $175,000 – 64S/32D; Four star	(Australia) John Alexander (Australia) Phil Dent; 7–6, 2–6, 6–3	(Australia) Ray Ruffels (Australia) Allan Stone	(United States) Vitas Gerulaitis (Australia) Cliff Letcher	(Australia) Phil Dent (United States) Bill Scanlon (Australia) Colin Dibley (United States) Butch Walts
19 Dec	Australian Open (December); Melbourne, Australia; Grand Slam; Grass – $200,000 – 64S/32D; Singles – Doubles	(United States) Vitas Gerulaitis; 6–3, 7–6, 5–7, 3–6, 6–2	(United Kingdom) John Lloyd	(Australia) John Alexander (Australia) Bob Giltinan	(Australia) Ray Ruffels (Australia) Ken Rosewall (Australia) John Newcombe (United Kingdom) Robin Drysdale
19 Dec	Australian Open (December); Melbourne, Australia; Grand Slam; Grass – $200,000 – 64S/32D; Singles – Doubles	(Australia) Ray Ruffels (Australia) Allan Stone; 7–6, 7–6	(Australia) John Alexander (Australia) Phil Dent	(Australia) John Alexander (Australia) Bob Giltinan	(Australia) Ray Ruffels (Australia) Ken Rosewall (Australia) John Newcombe (United Kingdom) Robin Drysdale

=== January 1978 ===
Week	Tournament	Champions	Runners-up	Semifinalists	Quarterfinalists
4 Jan	Colgate-Palmolive Masters; New York City, US; Masters Grand Prix; Carpet – $400,000 – 8S/4D; Singles – Doubles	(United States) Jimmy Connors; 6–4, 1–6, 6–4	(Sweden) Björn Borg	(Argentina) Guillermo Vilas (United States) Brian Gottfried	Round robin (Mexico) Raúl Ramírez (United States) Roscoe Tanner (Spain) Manuel Orantes (United States) Eddie Dibbs
4 Jan	Colgate-Palmolive Masters; New York City, US; Masters Grand Prix; Carpet – $400,000 – 8S/4D; Singles – Doubles	(South Africa) Bob Hewitt (South Africa) Frew McMillan; 7–5, 7–6, 6–3	(United States) Bob Lutz (United States) Stan Smith	(Argentina) Guillermo Vilas (United States) Brian Gottfried	Round robin (Mexico) Raúl Ramírez (United States) Roscoe Tanner (Spain) Manuel Orantes (United States) Eddie Dibbs

== Points system ==
The Grand Prix tournaments were divided into seven groups. Group TC consisted of the Grand Slam tournaments; the Australian Open, French Open, Wimbledon Championships and the US Open—while the other tournaments were given star ratings ranging from six stars to one star, based on prize money and draw size. Points were allocated based on these ratings and the finishing position of a player in a tournament. No points were awarded to first-round losers, and ties were settled by the number of tournaments played. The points allocation, with doubles points listed in brackets, is as follows:

Group TC
- Champion: 250 (50)
- Runner-up: 175 (35)
- Semifinalist: 100 (20)
- Quarterfinalist: 50 (10)
- Fourth round: 25 (5)
- Third round: 12 (2)
- Second round: 6

Six-star
- Champion: 175 (35)
- Runner-up: 122 (24)
- Semifinalist: 70 (14)
- Quarterfinalist: 35 (7)
- 9th – 16th: 17 (3)
- 17th – 32nd: 8

Five-star
- Champion: 150 (30)
- Runner-up: 105 (21)
- Semifinalist: 60 (12)
- Quarterfinalist: 30 (6)
- 9th – 16th: 15 (3)
- 17th – 32nd: 7

Four-star
- Champion: 125 (25)
- Runner-up: 87 (17)
- Semifinalist: 50 (10)
- Quarterfinalist: 25 (5)
- 9th – 16th: 12 (2)
- 17th – 32nd: 6

Three-star
- Champion: 100 (20)
- Runner-up: 70 (14)
- Semifinalist: 40 (8)
- 5th – 8th: 20 (4)
- 9th – 16th: 10 (2)
- 17th – 32nd: 5

Two-star
- Champion: 75 (15)
- Runner-up: 52 (10)
- Semifinalist: 30 (5)
- 5th – 8th: 15 (3)
- 9th – 16th: 7

One-star
- Champion: 50 (10)
- Runner-up: 35 (7)
- Semifinalist: 20 (4)
- 5th – 8th: 10 (2)
- 9th – 16th: 5

== Standings ==
The 1977 Grand Prix tournaments were divided in seven separate point categories, ranging from the Triple Crown tournaments (250 points for the winner) to the smallest One Star tournaments (50 points for the winner). At the end of the year the 35 top-ranked players received a bonus from the bonus pool. To qualify for a bonus a player must have played at least 15 tournaments. The top eight points ranked singles players and top four doubles teams were entitled to participate in the season-ending Masters tournament.

Rk	Name	Points	Bonus
1	Guillermo Vilas (ARG)	2,047	$300,000
2	Brian Gottfried (USA)	1,548	$125,000
3	Björn Borg (SWE)	1,210	$75,000
4	Manuel Orantes (ESP)	870	$50,000
5	Eddie Dibbs (USA)	777	$45,000
6	Roscoe Tanner (USA)	758	$40,000
7	Raúl Ramírez (MEX)	754	$35,000
8	Jimmy Connors (USA)	722	–
9	Vitas Gerulaitis (USA)	670	–
10	Harold Solomon (USA)	624	$32,000

== ATP rankings ==
As of 1 January 1977
Rk	Name
1	Jimmy Connors (USA)
2	Björn Borg (SWE)
3	Ilie Năstase (Romania)
4	Manuel Orantes (ESP)
5	Raúl Ramírez (MEX)
6	Guillermo Vilas (ARG)
7	Adriano Panatta (ITA)
8	Harold Solomon (USA)
9	Eddie Dibbs (USA)
10	Brian Gottfried (USA)
11	Roscoe Tanner (USA)
12	Arthur Ashe (USA)
13	Ken Rosewall (AUS)
14	Wojciech Fibak (POL)
15	Dick Stockton (USA)
16	Stan Smith (USA)
17	Mark Cox (GBR)
18	Vitas Gerulaitis (USA)
19	Jan Kodeš (TCH)
20	Robert Lutz (USA)

Year-end rankings 1977 (31 December 1977)
Rk	Name	Points	Average	Change
1	Jimmy Connors (USA)	897	59.80	=
2	Guillermo Vilas (ARG)	1610	57.50	▲ +4
3	Björn Borg (SWE)	906	53.29	▼ –1
4	Vitas Gerulaitis (USA)	762	50.80	▲ +14
5	Brian Gottfried (USA)	1215	46.73	▲ +5
6	Eddie Dibbs (USA)	848	31.41	▲ +3
7	Manuel Orantes (ESP)	671	30.50	▼ –3
8	Raúl Ramírez (MEX)	692	27.68	▼ –3
9	Ilie Năstase (ROU)	393	26.20	▼ –6
10	Dick Stockton (USA)	579	25.17	▲ +5
11	Corrado Barazzutti (ITA)	388	22.82	▲ +11
12	Ken Rosewall (AUS)	424	22.32	▲ +1
13	Wojciech Fibak (POL)	619	21.34	▲ +1
14	Harold Solomon (USA)	610	21.03	▼ –6
15	Roscoe Tanner (USA)	542	20.85	▼ –4
16	Sandy Mayer (USA)	346	20.35	▲ +59
17	Jaime Fillol (CHI)	452	19.65	▲ +7
18	John Alexander (AUS)	569	19.62	▲ +29
19	Tony Roche (AUS)	289	19.27	▲ +31
20	Buster Mottram (GBR)	425	18.48	▲ +21

== List of tournament winners ==
The list of winners and number of Grand Prix singles titles won, alphabetically by last number of titles:

- (Argentina) Guillermo Vilas (16) Springfield, Buenos Aires, Virginia Beach, French Open, Kitzbühel, Washington, D.C., Louisville, South Orange, Columbus, US Open, Paris, Tehran, Bogotá, Santiago, Buenos Aires, Johannesburg
- (Sweden) Björn Borg (10) Boca Raton, Memphis, Nice, Denver, Madrid, Barcelona, Wimbledon, Basel, Cologne, Wembley
- (United States) Vitas Gerulaitis (5) Ocean City, Rome, Brisbane, Perth, Australian Open (December)
- (United States) Brian Gottfried (5) Baltimore, Palm Springs, Washington Indoor, La Costa, Vienna
- (United States) Jeff Borowiak (3) Dayton, Gstaad, Montreal
- (United States) Jimmy Connors (3) Las Vegas, Maui, Sydney Indoor
- (United States) Tim Gullikson (3) Newport, Taiwan, Adelaide
- (United States) Sandy Mayer (3) Little Rock, Hampton, Stockholm
- (Spain) Manuel Orantes (3) Indianapolis, Boston, Tokyo Outdoor
- (India) Vijay Amritraj (2) Auckland, Bombay
- (Italy) Corrado Barazzutti (2) Båstad, Paris Bercy
- (Italy) Paolo Bertolucci (2) Hamburg, Berlin
- (United States) Eddie Dibbs (2) Miami, Oviedo
- (Mexico) Raúl Ramírez (2) Queen's Club, Los Angeles
- (United States) Harold Solomon (2) Brussels, Cincinnati
- (United States) Roscoe Tanner (2) Australian Open (January), Sydney Outdoor
- (Australia) John Alexander (1) North Conway
- (United Kingdom) Mark Cox (1) Helsinki
- (United States) Victor Amaya (1) Adelaide
- (Poland) Wojciech Fibak (1) Düsseldorf
- (Socialist Federal Republic of Yugoslavia) Željko Franulović (1) Munich
- (Spain) José Higueras (1) Murcia
- (Czechoslovakia) Jiří Hřebec (1) San Jose
- (West Germany) Karl Meiler (1) Manila
- (Romania) Ilie Năstase (1) Aix-en-Provence
- (Rhodesia) Andrew Pattison (1) Laguna Niguel
- (France) Patrick Proisy (1) Hilversum
- (Australia) Ken Rosewall (1) Hong Kong
- (United States) Stan Smith (1) Los Angeles PSW
- (United States) Brian Teacher (1) Jackson
- (United States) Butch Walts (1) San Francisco

The following players won their first title in 1977:

- (United States) Victor Amaya Adelaide
- (United States) Tim Gullikson Newport
- (Australia) Chris Kachel Manila
- (France) Patrick Proisy Hilversum
- (United States) Brian Teacher Jackson

== See also ==
- 1977 World Championship Tennis circuit
- 1977 WTA Tour
