= 1974 Dayton Pro Tennis Classic =

- Date: January 30 – February 2
- Edition: 1st
- Category: Independent
- Draw: 16S / 8D
- Prize money: $25,000
- Surface: Carpet / indoor
- Location: Dayton, Ohio, U.S.
- Venue: Dayton Convention Center

Champions

Singles
- (Mexico) Raúl Ramírez

Doubles
- (Australia) Ross Case / (Australia) Geoff Masters
Dayton Open	· 1975 →

The 1974 Dayton Pro Tennis Classic, was a men's tennis tournament played on indoor carpet courts at the Dayton Convention Center in Dayton, Ohio, in the United States. It was an independent event, i.e. not part of a tour or circuit. It was the inaugural edition of the event and was held from January 30 through February 2, 1974. First-seeded Raúl Ramírez won the singles title and earned $5,000 first-prize money.

== Finals ==
=== Singles ===
(Mexico) Raúl Ramírez defeated (United States) Brian Gottfried 6–1, 6–4, 7–6^{(7–1)}

- It was Ramírez' 1st singles title of the year and the 2nd of his career.

=== Doubles ===
(Australia) Ross Case / (Australia) Geoff Masters defeated (United States) Brian Gottfried / (United States) Dick Stockton 6–4, 6–7, 7–6
