= 1979 Dayton Pro Tennis Classic =

- Date: March 26 – April 1
- Edition: 6th
- Category: Grand Prix (One star)
- Draw: 32S / 16D
- Prize money: $75,000
- Surface: Carpet / indoor
- Location: Dayton, Ohio, U.S.
- Venue: Dayton Convention Center

Champions

Singles
- (United States) Butch Walts

Doubles
- (United States) Bruce Manson / (South Africa) Cliff Drysdale
- Dayton Open

The 1979 Dayton Pro Tennis Classic, was a men's tennis tournament played on indoor carpet courts at the Dayton Convention Center in Dayton, Ohio, in the United States that was part of the 1979 Grand Prix. It was the sixth edition of the event and was held from March 26 through April 1, 1979. Unseeded Butch Walts won his second singles title at the event after 1975 and earned $13,000 first-prize money.

== Finals ==
=== Singles ===
(United States) Butch Walts defeated (United States) Marty Riessen 6–3, 6–4

- It was Walts' 1st singles title of the year and the 3rd of his career.

=== Doubles ===
(United States) Bruce Manson / (South Africa) Cliff Drysdale defeated (Australia) Ross Case / (United States) Phil Dent 3–6, 6–3, 7–6^{(7–1)}
