= 1980 Dayton Pro Tennis Classic =

- Date: March 24–30
- Edition: 7th
- Category: Grand Prix
- Draw: 32S / 16D
- Prize money: $75,000
- Surface: Carpet / indoor
- Location: Dayton, Ohio, U.S.
- Venue: Dayton Convention Center

Champions

Singles
- (Poland) Wojciech Fibak

Doubles
- (Poland) Wojciech Fibak / (Australia) Geoff Masters
- Dayton Open

The 1980 Dayton Pro Tennis Classic, was a men's tennis tournament played on indoor carpet courts at the Dayton Convention Center in Dayton, Ohio, in the United States that was part of the 1980 Grand Prix. It was the seventh and last edition of the event and was held from March 24 through March 30, 1980. First-seeded Wojciech Fibak won the singles title and earned $15,000 first-prize money.

== Finals ==
=== Singles ===
(Poland) Wojciech Fibak defeated (United States) Bruce Manson 7–6^{(7–4)}, 6–3

- It was Fibak's 1st singles title of the year and the 9th of his career.

=== Doubles ===
(Poland) Wojciech Fibak / (Australia) Geoff Masters defeated (United States) Fritz Buehning / (United States) Fred McNair 6–4, 6–4
