= 1977 Dayton Pro Tennis Classic =

- Date: February 2–6
- Edition: 4th
- Category: Grand Prix (One star)
- Draw: 32S / 16D
- Prize money: $50,000
- Surface: Carpet / indoor
- Location: Dayton, Ohio, U.S.
- Venue: Dayton Convention Center

Champions

Singles
- (United States) Jeff Borowiak

Doubles
- (United States) Hank Pfister / (United States) Butch Walts
- Dayton Open

The 1977 Dayton Pro Tennis Classic, was a men's tennis tournament played on indoor carpet courts at the Dayton Convention Center in Dayton, Ohio, in the United States that was part of the 1977 Grand Prix. It was the fourth edition of the event and was held from February 2 through February 6, 1977. Unseeded Jeff Borowiak won the singles title and earned $10,000 first-prize money as well as 50 Grand Prix ranking points.

== Finals ==
=== Singles ===
(United States) Jeff Borowiak defeated (United Kingdom) Buster Mottram 6–4, 4–6, 6–4

- It was Borowiak's 1st singles title of the year and the 3rd of his career.

=== Doubles ===
(United States) Hank Pfister / (United States) Butch Walts defeated (United States) Jeff Borowiak / (Rhodesia) Andrew Pattison 6–4, 7–6
