= 1978 Dayton Pro Tennis Classic =

- Date: March 28 – April 2
- Edition: 5th
- Category: Grand Prix (One star)
- Draw: 32S / 16D
- Prize money: $75,000
- Surface: Carpet / indoor
- Location: Dayton, Ohio, U.S.
- Venue: Dayton Convention Center

Champions

Singles
- (United States) Brian Gottfried

Doubles
- (United States) Brian Gottfried / (Australia) Geoff Masters
- Dayton Open

The 1978 Dayton Pro Tennis Classic, was a men's tennis tournament played on indoor carpet courts at the Dayton Convention Center in Dayton, Ohio, in the United States that was part of the 1978 Grand Prix. It was the fifth edition of the event and was held from March 28 through April 2, 1978. First-seeded Brian Gottfried won his second singles title at the event after 1975 and earned $12,750 first-prize money.

== Finals ==
=== Singles ===
(United States) Brian Gottfried defeated (United States) Eddie Dibbs 2–6, 6–4, 7–6^{(7–4)}

- It was Gottfried's 2nd singles title of the year and the 14th of his career.

=== Doubles ===
(United States) Brian Gottfried / (Australia) Geoff Masters defeated (United States) Hank Pfister / (United States) Butch Walts 6–3, 6–4
