= 1977 Japan Open Tennis Championships =

- Date: 31 October – 6 November
- Edition: 5th
- Category: Grand Prix
- Draw: 64S / 32D
- Prize money: $100,000
- Surface: Hard / outdoor
- Location: Tokyo, Japan

Champions

Singles
- (Spain) Manuel Orantes

Doubles
- (Australia) Geoff Masters / (Australia) Kim Warwick
- Japan Open

The 1977 Japan Open was a men's tennis tournament played on hard courts and part of the 1977 Colgate-Palmolive Grand Prix. Also called the Fred Perry Japan Open its sponsored name took place in Tokyo, Japan. The tournament was held from 31 October through 6 November 1977. First-seeded Manuel Orantes won the singles title.

== Finals ==
=== Singles ===
(Spain) Manuel Orantes defeated (Australia) Kim Warwick, 6–2, 6–1

=== Doubles ===
(Australia) Geoff Masters / (Australia) Kim Warwick defeated (Australia) Colin Dibley / (Australia) Chris Kachel, 6–2, 7–6
