= Oviedo International =

Defunct tennis tournament
- Event name: Masaveu Cup (1951-1956); Oviedo International (1957-1971)
- Tour: ILTF World Circuit
- Founded: 1920
- Abolished: 1971
- Location: Oviedo; Spain
- Venue: Club de Tenis de Oviedo
- Category: International
- Surface: Clay / outdoor

The Oviedo International was an ILTF affiliated clay court tennis tournament founded in 1920 as the Copa del Rey In 1951 it was renamed as the Masaveu Cup. The event was first played at the Club de Tenis de Oviedo, Oviedo, Spain until 1971.

== History ==
Originally the event evolved out of the earlier as the Copa del Rey in 1920 and later the Copa Real Club de Tenis de Oviedo, establishing it as Spain's oldest active international tennis event.

In 1951 the integration of corporate association from Banca Masaveu and of its growth as part of the Spanish Circuito del Cantábrico (Bay of Biscay Circuit) led to it being rebranded as the Masaveu Cup.

In 1957 it was rebranded and elevated to a major international event by the Spanish Tennis Federation. The event was played at the Club de Tenis de Oviedo, Oviedo, Spain until 1971.

In 1976 a new successor indoor event was inaugurated the Grand Prix Masaveu de Asturias sponsored by Banca Masaveu. In 1978 the Copa Masaveu was relaunched as an ITF under 21 championship.

Today the event has evolved into a modern ITF Men's World Tennis Tour (Futures) events under various corporate titles (e.g., Ontier Cup, Riesco Cup).

== Past finals ==
=== Singles ===
(incomplete roll).

Year	Champion	Runner-Up	Score
1951	(France) Gil de Kermadec		
1952	(Czechoslovakia) Milan Matous	(Poland) Wladyslaw Skonecki	8–6, 3–6, 6–3
1953	(Mexico) Pancho Arcocha	(Argentina) Eduardo Soriano	7–5, 7–5, 6–4
1954	(Spain) Emilio Martínez del Rey		
1955	(Spain) Juan Manuel Couder		
1956	(Australia) Jack Arkinstall	(France) Robert Haillet	
1957	(Spain) Juan Manuel Couder (2)	(United Kingdom) Tony Pickard	6–3, 2–6, 6–4, 6–3
1958	(Venezuela) Isaias Pimentel	(Spain) Juan Manuel Couder	6–4, 7–5, 6–4
1959	(Spain) Andres Gimeno	(Spain) Juan Manuel Couder	5–7, 11–9, 6–4, 6–2
1960	(United Kingdom) Roger Becker	(Spain) Manuel Santana	9–7, 6–4, 6–8, 1–6, 7–5
1964	(Spain) Juan Manuel Couder (3)	(Brazil) Jose Edison Mandarino	6–2, 7–5, 6–4
1967	(Australia) Martin Mulligan	(Spain) Juan Manuel Couder	4–6, 6–4, 6–1, 6–0
1968	(Spain) Manuel Orantes	(Spain) Juan Manuel Couder	6–4, 6–1, 6–1
1969	(Spain) Manuel Orantes (2)	(Spain) Manuel Santana	3–6, 8–6, 4–6, 15–13, ret.
1971	(Spain) José Higueras	(Spain) José Moreno	6–0, 6–1, 6–2
