= 1977 Coliseum Mall International =

- Date: March 8–13
- Edition: 8th
- Category: Grand Prix (One Star)
- Draw: 32S / 16D
- Prize money: $50,000
- Surface: Carpet / indoor
- Location: Hampton, Virginia, United States
- Venue: Hampton Roads Coliseum

Champions

Singles
- (United States) Sandy Mayer

Doubles
- (United States) Sandy Mayer / (United States) Stan Smith
- Hampton Grand Prix

The 1977 Coliseum Mall International, also known as the Hampton Indoor, was a men's tennis tournament played on indoor carpet courts at the Hampton Roads Coliseum in Hampton, Virginia in the United States that was part of One Star category of the 1977 Grand Prix circuit. It was the eighth and final edition of the tournament and was held from March 8 through March 13, 1977. Sandy Mayer won the singles title and earned $15,000 first-prize money.

== Finals ==
=== Singles ===
(United States) Sandy Mayer defeated (United States) Stan Smith 4–6, 6–3, 6–2, 1–6, 6–3

- It was Mayer's 2nd singles title of the year and the 6th of his career.

=== Doubles ===
(United States) Sandy Mayer / (United States) Stan Smith defeated (Australia) Paul Kronk / (Australia) Cliff Letcher 6–4, 6–3
