= 1977 Hitachi West Coast Classic =

- Date: 24–30 October
- Edition: 3rd
- Category: Grand Prix (One Star)
- Draw: 32S / 16D
- Prize money: $50,000
- Surface: Hard / indoor
- Location: Perth, Western Australia, Australia
- Venue: Perth Entertainment Centre

Champions

Singles
- (United States) Vitas Gerulaitis

Doubles
- (Australia) Allan Stone / (Australia) Ray Ruffels
- Perth Indoor Tennis Classic

The 1977 Hitachi West Coast Classic was an Association of Tennis Professionals men's tournament played on indoor hard courts at the Perth Entertainment Centre in Perth, Western Australia, Australia that was part of the One Star category of the 1977 Grand Prix tennis circuit. It was the third and last edition of the tournament and was held from 24 October until 30 October 1977. Second-seeded Vitas Gerulaitis won the singles title.

== Finals ==
=== Singles ===
(United States) Vitas Gerulaitis defeated (Australia) Geoff Masters 6–3, 6–4, 6–2

- It was Gerulaitis' 4th singles title of the year and the 7th of his career.

=== Doubles ===
(Australia) Allan Stone / (Australia) Ray Ruffels defeated (United States) Nick Saviano / (United States) John Whitlinger 6–2, 6–1
