= 1977 South Pacific Championships =

- Date: 10–16 October
- Edition: 4th
- Category: Grand Prix (One Star)
- Draw: 32S / 16D
- Prize money: $50,000
- Surface: Grass / outdoor
- Location: Brisbane, Queensland, Australia
- Venue: Milton Courts

Champions

Singles
- (United States) Vitas Gerulaitis

Doubles
- (United States) Vitas Gerulaitis / (United States) Bill Scanlon
- South Pacific Tennis Classic

The 1977 South Pacific Championships was an Association of Tennis Professionals men's tournament held on outdoor grass courts at the Milton Courts in Brisbane, Queensland, Australia that was part of the One Star category of the 1977 Grand Prix tennis circuit. It was the fourth edition of the tournament and was held from 10 October until 16 October 1977. First-seeded Vitas Gerulaitis won the singles title.

== Finals ==
=== Singles ===
(United States) Vitas Gerulaitis defeated (Australia) Tony Roche 6–7^{(2–7)}, 6–1, 6–1, 7–5

- It was Gerulaitis' 3rd singles title of the year and the 6th of his career.

=== Doubles ===
(United States) Vitas Gerulaitis / (United States) Bill Scanlon defeated (Australia) Mal Anderson / (Australia) Ken Rosewall 7–6, 6–4
