= 1977 Colgate Tennis Patrons Classic =

Tennis tournament

- Date: 7–13 November
- Edition: 5th
- Category: Grand Prix (Two Star)
- Draw: 32S / 16D
- Prize money: $75,000
- Surface: Hard / outdoor
- Location: Hong Kong

Champions

Singles
- (Australia) Ken Rosewall

Doubles
- (Australia) Kim Warwick / (Australia) Syd Ball
- Hong Kong Open

The 1977 Colgate Tennis Patrons Classic, also known as the Hong Kong Open, was a men's tennis tournament played on outdoor hard courts in Hong Kong. It was the fifth edition of the event and was held from 7 November through 13 November 1977. The tournament was part of the Two Star tier of the 1977 Grand Prix tennis circuit. Unseeded Ken Rosewall won his second consecutive singles title at the event.

== Finals ==
=== Singles ===
(Australia) Ken Rosewall defeated (United States) Tom Gorman 6–3, 5–7, 6–4, 6–4

- It was Rosewall's 1st singles title of the year and the 42nd of his career in the Open Era.

=== Doubles ===
(Australia) Kim Warwick / (Australia) Syd Ball defeated (United States) Marty Riessen / (United States) Roscoe Tanner 7–6, 6–3
