= Dayton Pro Tennis Classic =

Defunct tennis tournament
- Event name: Dayton Pro Tennis Classic; Dayton Open
- Tour: IPA Indoor Circuit; Grand Prix circuit
- Founded: 1974
- Abolished: 1980
- Editions: 7
- Surface: Carpet / indoor

The Dayton Pro Tennis Classic' is a defunct Grand Prix-affiliated men's tennis tournament played from 1974 to 1980. It was held on indoor carpet courts in Dayton, Ohio in the United States and played on indoor carpet courts.

== Finals ==
=== Singles ===
Year	Champions	Runners-up	Score
1974	(Mexico) Raúl Ramírez	(United States) Brian Gottfried	6–1, 6–4, 7–6^{(7–1)}
1975	(United States) Brian Gottfried	(Australia) Geoff Masters	6–4, 4–6, 6–4
1976	(Chile) Jaime Fillol	(Rhodesia) Andrew Pattison	6–4, 6–7, 6–4
1977	(United States) Jeff Borowiak	(United Kingdom) Buster Mottram	6–3, 6–3
1978	(United States) Brian Gottfried	(United States) Eddie Dibbs	2–6, 6–4, 7–6
1979	(United States) Butch Walts	(United States) Marty Riessen	6–3, 6–4
1980	(Poland) Wojciech Fibak	(United States) Bruce Manson	7–6^{(7–4)}, 6–3

=== Doubles ===
Year	Champions	Runners-up	Score
1974	(Australia) Ross Case (Australia) Geoff Masters	(United States) Brian Gottfried (United States) Dick Stockton	6–4, 6–7, 7–6
1975	(Australia) Ray Ruffels (Australia) Allan Stone	(United States) Paul Gerken (United States) Brian Gottfried	7–6, 7–5
1976	(Australia) Ray Ruffels (United States) Sherwood Stewart	(Chile) Jaime Fillol (United States) Charlie Pasarell	6–2, 3–6, 7–5
1977	(United States) Hank Pfister (United States) Butch Walts	(United States) Jeff Borowiak (Rhodesia) Andrew Pattison	6–4, 7–6
1978	(United States) Brian Gottfried (Australia) Geoff Masters	(United States) Hank Pfister (United States) Butch Walts	6–3, 6–4
1979	(South Africa) Cliff Drysdale (United States) Bruce Manson	(Australia) Ross Case (Australia) Phil Dent	3–6, 6–3, 7–6
1980	(Poland) Wojciech Fibak (Australia) Geoff Masters	(United States) Fritz Buehning (United States) Fred McNair	6–4, 6–4
