= 1977 Raquette d'Or =

- Date: 26 September – 2 October
- Edition: 1st
- Category: Grand Prix (One star)
- Draw: 32S / 16D
- Prize money: $50,000
- Surface: Clay / outdoor
- Location: Aix-en-Provence, France

Champions

Singles
- (Romania) Ilie Năstase

Doubles
- (Romania) Ilie Năstase / (Romania) Ion Țiriac
Aix-en-Provence Open	· 1978 →

The 1977 Raquette d'Or was a men's tennis tournament staged in Aix-en-Provence, France that was part of the One star category of the 1977 Grand Prix circuit. The tournament was played on outdoor clay courts and was held from 26 September until 2 October 1977. It was the inaugural edition of the tournament. Ilie Năstase won the singles title. In a five-set final against Guillermo Vilas he had won the first two sets when Vilas retired in protest of Năstase's use of a spaghetti strung racquet (which was banned shortly after by the ITF).

== Finals ==
=== Singles ===
(Romania) Ilie Năstase defeated (Argentina) Guillermo Vilas 6–1, 7–5, def.

- It was Năstase's 3rd singles title of the year and the 62nd of his career.

=== Doubles ===
(Romania) Ilie Năstase / (Romania) Ion Țiriac defeated (France) Patrice Dominguez / (Sweden) Rolf Norberg 1–6, 7–5, 6–3, 6–3
