= 1977 Swiss Open Championships =

- Date: 3–10 July
- Edition: 32nd
- Category: Grand Prix
- Draw: 32S / 16D
- Prize money: $75,000
- Surface: Clay / outdoor
- Location: Gstaad, Switzerland

Champions

Singles
- (United States) Jeff Borowiak

Doubles
- (West Germany) Jürgen Fassbender / (West Germany) Karl Meiler
- Suisse Open Gstaad

The 1977 Swiss Open Championships was a men's tennis tournament played on outdoor clay courts in Gstaad, Switzerland. It was the 32nd edition of the tournament and was held from 3 July through 10 July 1977. The tournament was part of the Grand Prix tennis circuit with a total prize money available of $75,000. Fourth-seeded Jeff Borowiak won the singles title.

== Finals ==
=== Singles ===
(United States) Jeff Borowiak defeated (France) Jean-François Caujolle 2–6, 6–1, 6–3

- It was Borowiak's 2nd singles title of the year and the 4th of his career.

=== Doubles ===
(West Germany) Jürgen Fassbender / (West Germany) Karl Meiler defeated (Switzerland) Colin Dowdeswell / (South Africa) Bob Hewitt 6–4, 7–6
