= 1977 Dutch Open (tennis) =

- Date: 12–18 July
- Edition: 20th
- Category: Grand Prix (Two star)
- Draw: 32S / 16D
- Prize money: $75,000
- Surface: Clay / outdoor
- Location: Hilversum, Netherlands
- Venue: 't Melkhuisje

Champions

Singles
- (France) Patrick Proisy

Doubles
- (Spain) José Higueras / (Spain) Antonio Muñoz
- Dutch Open

The 1977 Dutch Open was a Grand Prix tennis tournament staged in Hilversum, Netherlands. The tournament was played on outdoor clay courts and was held from 12 July to 18 July 1977. It was the 20th edition of the tournament. Patrick Proisy won the singles title.

== Finals ==
=== Singles ===
(France) Patrick Proisy defeated (Argentina) Lito Álvarez 6–0, 6–2, 6–0

- It was Proisy's first singles title of the year and the second of his career.

=== Doubles ===
(Spain) José Higueras / (Spain) Antonio Muñoz defeated (France) Jean-Louis Haillet / (France) François Jauffret 6–1, 6–4, 2–6, 6–1
