= 1976 Dayton Pro Tennis Classic =

- Date: February 4–8
- Edition: 3rd
- Category: USLTA Indoor Circuit
- Draw: 16S / 8D
- Prize money: $35,000
- Surface: Carpet / indoor
- Location: Dayton, Ohio, U.S.
- Venue: Dayton Convention Center

Champions

Singles
- (Chile) Jaime Fillol

Doubles
- (Australia) Ray Ruffels / (United States) Sherwood Stewart
- Dayton Open

The 1976 Dayton Pro Tennis Classic, was a men's tennis tournament played on indoor carpet courts at the Dayton Convention Center in Dayton, Ohio, in the United States that was part of the 1976 USLTA Indoor Circuit. It was the third edition of the event and was held from February 4 through February 8, 1976. First-seeded Jaime Fillol won the singles title and earned $10,000 first-prize money.

== Finals ==
=== Singles ===
(Chile) Jaime Fillol defeated (Rhodesia) Andrew Pattison 6–4, 6–7, 6–4

- It was Fillol's 1st singles title of the year and the 7th of his career.

=== Doubles ===
(Australia) Ray Ruffels / (United States) Sherwood Stewart defeated (Chile) Jaime Fillol / (United States) Charlie Pasarell 6–2, 3–6, 7–5
