= 1977 La Costa International Tennis Classic =

- Date: March 21–27
- Edition: 5th
- Category: Grand Prix (Three Star)
- Draw: 32S / 16D
- Prize money: $100,000
- Surface: Hard / outdoor
- Location: La Costa, California, U.S.
- Venue: La Costa County Club

Champions

Singles
- (United States) Brian Gottfried

Doubles
- (South Africa) Bob Hewitt / (South Africa) Frew McMillan
- La Costa WCT

The 1977 La Costa International Tennis Classic, was a men's tennis tournament played on outdoor hard courts at the La Costa County Club in La Costa, California in the United States. The tournament was part of Three Star category of the 1977 Grand Prix circuit. It was the fifth edition of the event and was held from March 21 through March 27, 1977. Third-seeded Brian Gottfried won the singles title and earned $16,000 first-prize money.

== Finals ==
=== Singles ===
(United States) Brian Gottfried defeated (United States) Marty Riessen 6–3, 6–2

- It was Gottfried's 4th singles title of the year and the 11th of his career.

=== Doubles ===
(South Africa) Bob Hewitt / (South Africa) Frew McMillan defeated (Australia) Ray Ruffels / (Australia) Allan Stone 6–4, 6–2
