= 1977 Colgate Tennis Patrons Classic – Singles =

Tennis tournament event

Singles
- 1977 Colgate Tennis Patrons Classic

Final
- Champion: (Australia) Ken Rosewall
- Runner-up: (United States) Tom Gorman
- Score: 6–3, 5–7, 6–4, 6–4

Details
- Draw: 32
- Seeds: 2

Events
Singles	Doubles
- Hong Kong Open

The 1977 Colgate Tennis Patrons Classic – Singles was an event of the 1977 Colgate Tennis Patrons Classic tennis tournament, also known as the Hong Kong Open, and was played on outdoor hard courts in Hong Kong, between 7 November and 13 November 1977. The draw comprised 32 players and two of them were seeded. Unseeded Ken Rosewall was the defending Hong Kong Open singles champion and retained the title after defeating unseeded Tom Gorman in the final, 6–3, 5–7, 6–4, 6–4.

== Seeds ==
1. (Spain) Manuel Orantes (first round)
2. (United States) Dick Stockton (quarterfinals)

== Draw ==
Key

- Q = Qualifier
- WC = Wild card
- LL = Lucky loser
- Alt = Alternate
- ITF = ITF entry
- PR = Protected ranking
- SR = Special ranking
- SE = Special exempt
- JE = Junior exempt
- JR = Junior Accelerator Programme entrant
- CO = College Accelerator Programme entrant
- NG = Next Gen Accelerator Program entrant
- w/o = Walkover
- r = Retired
- d = Defaulted

=== Finals ===
Semifinals
(United States) Thomas Gorman	6	6
(West Germany) Karl Meiler	1	2
(Australia) Ken Rosewall	4	6	6
(United States) Pat DuPré	6	3	2

Final
(United States) Tom Gorman	3	7	4	4
(Australia) Ken Rosewall	6	5	6	6

=== Top half ===
First Round
1	(Spain) Manuel Orantes	6	1
(United States) Tom Gullikson	7	6
(Australia) Rod Frawley	2	1
(United States) Tom Gorman	6	6
(France) Jean-François Caujolle	3	4
(United States) Nick Saviano	6	6
(West Germany) Hans-Jürgen Pohmann	2	0
(Australia) Colin Dibley	6	6
(United States) Roscoe Tanner	6	6
(Australia) Chris Kachel	3	1
(United States) Tim Wilkison	6	3
(West Germany) Karl Meiler	7	6
(United States) Jim Delaney	3	6	6
(United States) John Whitlinger	6	3	2
(United States) Mike Cahill	6	1	6
(Australia) Dick Crealy	4	6	4

Second Round
(United States) Tom Gullikson	2	4
(United States) Tom Gorman	6	6
(United States) Nick Saviano	7	7
(Australia) Colin Dibley	5	5
(United States) Roscoe Tanner	6	3	6
(West Germany) Karl Meiler	4	6	7
(United States) Jim Delaney	6	6	1
(United States) Mike Cahill	4	7	6

Quarterfinals
(United States) Tom Gorman	6	4	6
(United States) Nick Saviano	3	6	2
(West Germany) Karl Meiler	6	6
(United States) Mike Cahill	3	4

Semifinals
(United States) Tom Gorman	6	6
(West Germany) Karl Meiler	1	2

=== Bottom half ===
First Round
(Australia) Kim Warwick	6	6
(Egypt) Ismail El Shafei	2	3
(Australia) Allan Stone	6	1	6
(New Zealand) Russell Simpson	2	6	2
(United States) Terry Moor	6	6
(India) Jasjit Singh	4	1
(Czechoslovakia) Vladimír Zedník	6	3	0
(Australia) Ken Rosewall	3	6	6
(United States) Tim Gullikson	7	6
(United States) Rick Fagel	6	1
(United States) Pat DuPré	5	6	6
(Australia) Geoff Masters	7	4	4
(West Germany) Jürgen Fassbender	2	2
(United States) Marty Riessen	6	6
(Czechoslovakia) Jiří Hřebec	2	4
2	(United States) Dick Stockton	6	6

Second Round
(Australia) Kim Warwick	3	2
(Australia) Allan Stone	6	6
(United States) Terry Moor	7	6	3
(Australia) Ken Rosewall	5	7	6
(United States) Tim Gullikson	5	6	6
(United States) Pat DuPré	7	3	7
(United States) Marty Riessen	0	3
2	(United States) Dick Stockton	6	6

Quarterfinals
(Australia) Allan Stone	6	6	3
(Australia) Ken Rosewall	1	7	6
(United States) Pat DuPré	6	7	6
2	(United States) Dick Stockton	7	6	4

Semifinals
(Australia) Ken Rosewall	4	6	6
(United States) Pat DuPré	6	3	2
