= 1975 Dayton Pro Tennis Classic =

- Date: January 28 – February 2
- Edition: 2nd
- Category: USLTA Indoor Circuit
- Draw: 16S / 8D
- Prize money: $30,000
- Surface: Carpet / indoor
- Location: Dayton, Ohio, U.S.
- Venue: UD Arena

Champions

Singles
- (United States) Brian Gottfried

Doubles
- (Australia) Ray Ruffels / (Australia) Allan Stone
- Dayton Open

The 1975 Dayton Pro Tennis Classic, was a men's tennis tournament played on indoor carpet courts at the UD Arena in Dayton, Ohio, in the United States that was part of the 1975 USLTA Indoor Circuit. It was the second edition of the event and was held from January 28 through February 2, 1975. First-seeded Brian Gottfried won the singles title and earned $8,000 first-prize money.

== Finals ==
=== Singles ===
(United States) Brian Gottfried defeated (Australia) Geoff Masters 6–4, 4–6, 6–4

- It was Gottfried's 2nd singles title of the year and the 5th of his career.

=== Doubles ===
(Australia) Ray Ruffels / (Australia) Allan Stone defeated (United States) Paul Gerken / (United States) Brian Gottfried 7–6, 7–6
