= 1977 Düsseldorf International =

- Date: 16–22 May
- Edition: 8th
- Category: Grand Prix (Two Star)
- Draw: 32S / 16D
- Prize money: $75,000
- Surface: Clay / outdoor
- Location: Düsseldorf, West Germany
- Venue: Rochusclub

Champions

Singles
- (Poland) Wojciech Fibak

Doubles
- (West Germany) Jürgen Fassbender / (West Germany) Karl Meiler
- Düsseldorf Grand Prix

The 1977 Düsseldorf International was a men's Grand Prix tennis circuit tournament held at the Rochusclub in Düsseldorf, West Germany and played on outdoor clay courts. It was the eighth and final edition of the tournament and was held from 16 May until 22 May 1977. First-seeded Wojciech Fibak won the singles title.

== Finals ==
=== Singles ===
(Poland) Wojciech Fibak defeated (South Africa) Ray Moore 6–1, 5–7, 6–2

- It was Fibak's 2nd singles title of the year and the 5th of his career.

=== Doubles ===
(West Germany) Jürgen Fassbender / (West Germany) Karl Meiler defeated (Australia) Paul Kronk / (Australia) Cliff Letcher 6–3, 6–3
