= 1977 Colgate Tennis Patrons Classic – Doubles =

Tennis tournament event

Doubles
- 1977 Colgate Tennis Patrons Classic

Final
- Champion: (Australia) Kim Warwick (Australia) Syd Ball
- Runner-up: (United States) Marty Riessen (United States) Roscoe Tanner
- Score: 7–6, 6–3

Details
- Draw: 16
- Seeds: 2

Events
Singles	Doubles
- Hong Kong Open

The 1977 Colgate Tennis Patrons Classic – Doubles was an event of the 1977 Colgate Tennis Patrons Classic tennis tournament, also known as the Hong Kong Open, and was played on outdoor hard courts in Hong Kong, between 7 November and 13 November 1977. The draw comprised 16 teams and two of them were seeded. Hank Pfister and Butch Walts were the defending Hong Kong Open doubles champions but did not participate in this edition. The second seeded team of Kim Warwick and Syd Ball won the doubles title by defeating the first-seeded pairing of Marty Riessen and Roscoe Tanner in the final, 7–6, 6–3.

== Seeds ==
1. (United States) Marty Riessen / (United States) Roscoe Tanner (Final)
2. (Australia) Syd Ball / (Australia) Kim Warwick (Champions)

== Draw ==
Key

- Q = Qualifier
- WC = Wild card
- LL = Lucky loser
- Alt = Alternate
- ITF = ITF entry
- PR = Protected ranking
- SR = Special ranking
- SE = Special exempt
- JE = Junior exempt
- JR = Junior Accelerator Programme entrant
- CO = College Accelerator Programme entrant
- NG = Next Gen Accelerator Program entrant
- w/o = Walkover
- r = Retired
- d = Defaulted

First Round
1	(United States) Marty Riessen (United States) Roscoe Tanner	6	6
(Australia) Colin Dibley (Australia) Chris Kachel	4	3
(United States) Pat DuPré (Mexico) Marcello Lara	3	2
(Australia) Bob Carmichael (Australia) Allan Stone	6	6
(United States) Tom Gorman (Australia) Ken Rosewall	6	6	6
(Czechoslovakia) Jiří Hřebec (Czechoslovakia) Vladimír Zedník	4	7	1
(Egypt) Ismail El Shafei (Australia) Geoff Masters	6	4	6
(United States) Mike Cahill (United States) Terry Moor	3	6	4
(West Germany) Jürgen Fassbender (West Germany) Karl Meiler	7	6
(France) Jean-François Caujolle (United States) Jim Delaney	6	2
(United States) Nick Saviano (United States) John Whitlinger	6	7
(United States) Scott Carnahan (United States) Chico Hagey	2	6
(United States) Tim Gullikson (United States) Tom Gullikson	6	6	7
(Australia) Dick Crealy (Australia) Cliff Letcher	7	4	6
(New Zealand) Russell Simpson (Australia) John Bartlett	2	3
2	(Australia) Syd Ball (Australia) Kim Warwick	6	6

Quarterfinals
1	(United States) Marty Riessen (United States) Roscoe Tanner	7	6
(Australia) Bob Carmichael (Australia) Allan Stone	6	4
(United States) Tom Gorman (Australia) Ken Rosewall	2	7	6
(Egypt) Ismail El Shafei (Australia) Geoff Masters	6	6	2
(West Germany) Jürgen Fassbender (West Germany) Karl Meiler	2	7	7
(United States) Nick Saviano (United States) John Whitlinger	6	6	6
(United States) Tim Gullikson (United States) Tom Gullikson	6	6
2	(Australia) Syd Ball (Australia) Kim Warwick	7	7

Semifinals
1	(United States) Marty Riessen (United States) Roscoe Tanner	6	6
(United States) Tom Gorman (Australia) Ken Rosewall	4	2
(West Germany) Jürgen Fassbender (West Germany) Karl Meiler	6	6	3
2	(Australia) Syd Ball (Australia) Kim Warwick	7	3	6

Final
1	(United States) Marty Riessen (United States) Roscoe Tanner	6	3
2	(Australia) Syd Ball (Australia) Kim Warwick	7	6
