= Grand Prix Masaveu de Asturias =

Defunct tennis tournament
- Tour: Grand Prix circuit (1977) men
- Founded: 1976; 50 years ago
- Abolished: 1977; 49 years ago
- Location: Oviedo, Spain
- Venue: Oviedo Sports Pavillion
- Surface: Hard / indoor
- Draw: 32 S
- Prize money: $100,000

The Grand Prix Masaveu de Asturias was a men's Grand Prix circuit affiliated indoor hard court tennis tournament held one time in November 1977. Also known as Masaveu Asturias Open it was played at the Oviedo Sports Pavilion, Oviedo, Spain.

This event was briefly the successor tournament to the earlier Oviedo International originally founded in 1951 Masaveu Cup. In 1978 the Masaveu Cup became a standalone under 21 tournament.

== Finals ==
=== Men's singles ===
| Year | Winner | Runner-up | Score |
|---|---|---|---|
| 1977 | (United States) Eddie Dibbs | (Mexico) Raul Ramirez | 6-4, 6-1 |
