= Dayton Convention Center =

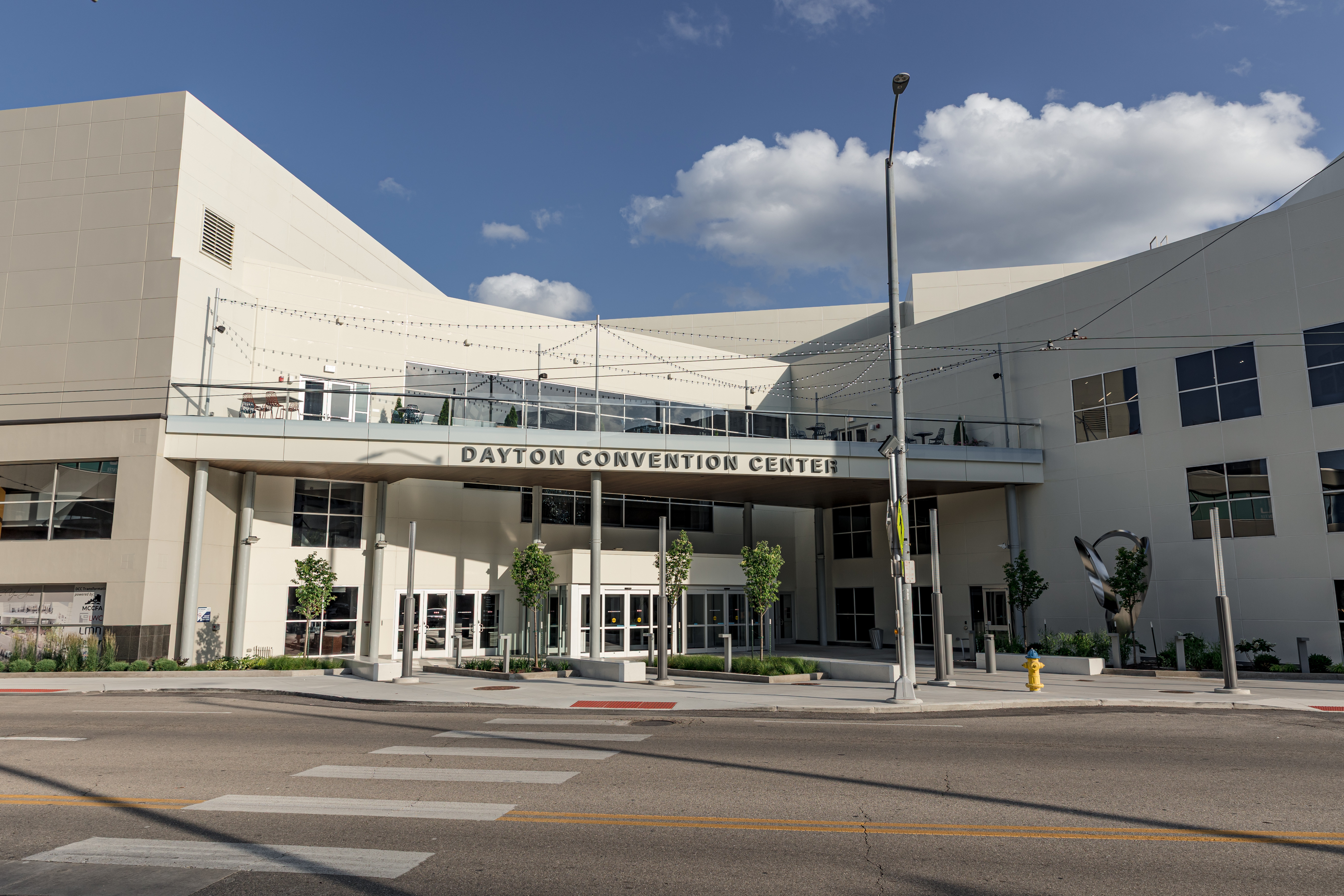
- Dayton Convention Center
- Interactive map of Dayton Convention Center
- Address: 22 E. Fifth Street
- Location: Dayton, Ohio
- Coordinates: 39.756503°N 84.190122°W
- Owner: Montgomery County Convention Facilities Authority
- Operator: Legends Global

Construction
- Built: 1973

Website
- www.daytonconventioncenter.com

The Dayton Convention Center is the primary public convention center in Dayton, Ohio, United States.

Located in downtown Dayton at 22 E. Fifth Street, the Dayton Convention Center is a 300,000 sq ft (27,870 m^{2}) facility with 63,000 sq ft (5,852 m^{2}) of exhibit space, a 654-seat theater, and 18 meeting rooms including an Executive Suite overlooking the exhibit halls.

== History ==
The Dayton Convention Center was built prior to 1973 on the intersection of Jefferson Street and Fifth Street in downtown Dayton. The Dayton Crowne Plaza along with the City of Dayton Transportation Bureau Parking Garage are connected to the Dayton Convention Center. After 27 years of operation, the City of Dayton City Commission approved a $2.5 million facade renovation which included a $350,000 LED marquee, a coffee shop, as well as its distinctive rotunda entrance.

In 2014, the Dayton Convention Center merged with the City of Dayton Department of Recreation and Youth Services. This merger allowed the Dayton Convention Center access to the Department of Recreation and Youth Services' programs including the three golf courses under ownership of the Department of Recreation and Youth Services: Community Golf Course, Kittyhawk Golf Course, and Madden Golf Course.

== See also ==
- List of Convention Centers in the United States
- Dayton, Ohio
- Dayton Metropolitan Area
- 1976 Dayton Pro Tennis Classic
