= 1980 Wimbledon Championships – Men's singles qualifying =

Men's singles qualifying
- 1980 Wimbledon Championships

Events
Singles	men	women		boys	girls
Doubles	men	women	mixed	boys	girls
WC Singles	men	women	quad
WC Doubles	men	women	quad
Legends	men	women	seniors

Qualification
Singles	men	women
Doubles	men	women	mixed
- Wimbledon Championships

Players who neither had high enough rankings nor received wild cards to enter the main draw of the annual Wimbledon Tennis Championships participated in a qualifying tournament held one week before the event. Several players withdrew from the main draw after qualifying had commenced, leading to the highest ranked players who lost in the final qualifying round to be entered into the main draw as lucky losers.

== Seeds ==
1. (Australia) Paul Kronk (first round)
2. (Brazil) João Soares (first round)
3. (Australia) Syd Ball (qualifying competition, lucky loser)
4. (United States) Tom Cain (second round)
5. (Australia) David Carter (second round)
6. (United States) Van Winitsky (qualifying competition, lucky loser)
7. (United States) John Austin (qualifying competition, lucky loser)
8. (India) Sashi Menon (qualifying competition, lucky loser)
9. (New Zealand) Onny Parun (qualified)
10. (United States) Bill Maze (first round)
11. (Republic of Ireland) Sean Sorensen (qualified)
12. (United States) George Hardie (qualified)
13. (India) Ramesh Krishnan (qualified)
14. (South Africa) John Yuill (qualified)
15. (South Africa) David Schneider (qualifying competition, lucky loser)
16. (Finland) Leo Palin (qualifying competition, lucky loser)
17. (Argentina) Guillermo Aubone (first round)
18. (United States) Gene Malin (qualifying competition)
19. (Australia) Dale Collings (qualifying competition)
20. (Australia) Cliff Letcher (second round)
21. (United States) Rick Fisher (qualifying competition)
22. (United States) Fred McNair (second round)
23. (United States) Glenn Petrovic (qualifying competition)
24. (United States) Eric Fromm (second round)
25. (France) Thierry Tulasne (first round)
26. (Colombia) Alejandro Cortes (first round)
27. (Australia) Greg Whitecross (qualifying competition)
28. (Australia) Chris Kachel (qualified)
29. (United States) Bruce Kleege (first round)
30. (South Africa) Eddie Edwards (qualified)

== Qualifiers ==
1. (Egypt) Ismail El Shafei
2. (Australia) Chris Johnstone
3. (Australia) John Fitzgerald
4. (United States) Scott Davis
5. (South Africa) Kevin Curren
6. (Australia) Peter Doohan
7. (United Kingdom) John Paish
8. (Australia) Chris Kachel
9. (New Zealand) Onny Parun
10. (Republic of Ireland) Matt Doyle
11. (Republic of Ireland) Sean Sorensen
12. (United States) George Hardie
13. (India) Ramesh Krishnan
14. (South Africa) John Yuill
15. (Australia) Wayne Hampson
16. (South Africa) Eddie Edwards

== Lucky losers ==
1. (India) Sashi Menon
2. (United States) John Austin
3. (Australia) Syd Ball
4. (Finland) Leo Palin
5. (United States) Van Winitsky
6. (South Africa) David Schneider

== Qualifying draw ==
Key

- Q = Qualifier
- WC = Wild card
- LL = Lucky loser
- Alt = Alternate
- ITF = ITF entry
- PR = Protected ranking
- SR = Special ranking
- SE = Special exempt
- JE = Junior exempt
- JR = Junior Accelerator Programme entrant
- CO = College Accelerator Programme entrant
- NG = Next Gen Accelerator Program entrant
- w/o = Walkover
- r = Retired
- d = Defaulted

=== First qualifier ===
First round
1	(Australia) Paul Kronk	6	4
(Egypt) Ismail El Shafei	7	6
(United States) Rich Andrews	6	6	6
(Spain) Roberto Vizcaino-Mallol	2	7	4
(Australia) Peter Della Vedova	7	7
(Sweden) Jan Gunnarsson	6	6
(United States) Maurice Hunter	7	2	5
23	(United States) Glenn Petrovic	5	6	7

Second round
(Egypt) Ismail El Shafei	7	6
(United States) Rich Andrews	6	4
(Australia) Peter Della Vedova	2	3
23	(United States) Glenn Petrovic	6	6

Qualifying competition
(Egypt) Ismail El Shafei	6	6	5	6
23	(United States) Glenn Petrovic	3	2	7	4

=== Second qualifier ===
First round
2	(Brazil) João Soares	3	6	3
(Puerto Rico) Manuel Diaz	6	4	6
(Australia) Chris Johnstone	6	5	8
(United States) Bruce Nichols	2	7	6
(South Africa) Mike Myburg	4	6	10
(Japan) Shinichi Sakamoto	6	2	8
(South Africa) Rory Chappell	3	4
22	(United States) Fred McNair	6	6

Second round
(Puerto Rico) Manuel Diaz	6	1
(Australia) Chris Johnstone	7	6
(South Africa) Mike Myburg	5
22	(United States) Fred McNair	2^{r}

Qualifying competition
(Australia) Chris Johnstone	7	6	6	4	6
(South Africa) Mike Myburg	6	2	7	6	2

=== Third qualifier ===
First round
3	(Australia) Syd Ball	6	7
(United States) Eric Friedler	2	6
(South Africa) Charles Honey	6	6
(West Germany) Peter Holl	2	3
(Australia) John Fitzgerald	7	6
(United States) Doug Adler	6	4
(Brazil) Marcos Hocevar	5	6	7
(France) Hervé Gauvain	7	1	5

Second round
3	(Australia) Syd Ball	6	6
(South Africa) Charles Honey	3	4
(Australia) John Fitzgerald	7	6	6
(Brazil) Marcos Hocevar	6	7	2

Qualifying competition
3	(Australia) Syd Ball	3	4	6
(Australia) John Fitzgerald	6	6	7

=== Fourth qualifier ===
First round
4	(United States) Tom Cain	3	6	6
(United States) Mike Shore	6	2	4
(United States) Scott Carnahan	7	6
(United States) Drew Gitlin	5	3
(South Africa) Frank Punčec	6	7
(Australia) Wally Masur	2	6
(United States) Scott Davis	6	6
25	(France) Thierry Tulasne	4	4

Second round
4	(United States) Tom Cain	4	5
(United States) Scott Carnahan	6	7
(South Africa) Frank Punčec	6	5
(United States) Scott Davis	7	7

Qualifying competition
(United States) Scott Carnahan	1	7	6	6	3
(United States) Scott Davis	6	5	7	3	6

=== Fifth qualifier ===
First round
5	(Australia) David Carter	6	6
(Sweden) Mats Wilander	4	2
(South Africa) Kevin Curren	6	6
(France) Henri Leconte	4	3
(United States) Richard Meyer	6	6
(United Kingdom) Tony Lloyd	2	4
(United Kingdom) Nigel Sears	1	1
21	(United States) Rick Fisher	6	6

Second round
5	(Australia) David Carter	3	0^{r}
(South Africa) Kevin Curren	6	1
(United States) Richard Meyer	6	3	4
21	(United States) Rick Fisher	4	6	6

Qualifying competition
(South Africa) Kevin Curren	6	7	7
21	(United States) Rick Fisher	4	6	6

=== Sixth qualifier ===
First round
6	(United States) Van Winitsky	5	6	6
(United States) Glen Holroyd	7	0	3
(Zimbabwe) Haroon Ismail	7	6
(Japan) Shigeyuki Nishio	5	4
(United States) Andy Kohlberg	6	6	6
(France) Jean-Baptiste Chanfreau	4	7	2
(Australia) Peter Doohan	7	3
17	(Argentina) Guillermo Aubone	5	1^{r}

Second round
6	(United States) Van Winitsky	6	7
(Zimbabwe) Haroon Ismail	3	6
(United States) Andy Kohlberg	3	2
(Australia) Peter Doohan	6	6

Qualifying competition
6	(United States) Van Winitsky	6	3	4	6
(Australia) Peter Doohan	0	6	6	7

=== Seventh qualifier ===
First round
7	(United States) John Austin	6	6
(Japan) Kenichi Hirai	4	2
(Nigeria) Nduka Odizor	3	7	6
(New Zealand) David Mustard	6	6	2
(United Kingdom) John Paish	4	6	6
(Philippines) Beeyong Sison	6	2	3
(United States) Zan Guerry	2	2
20	(Australia) Cliff Letcher	6	6

Second round
7	(United States) John Austin	6	6
(Nigeria) Nduka Odizor	4	4
(United Kingdom) John Paish	2	6	6
20	(Australia) Cliff Letcher	6	1	4

Qualifying competition
7	(United States) John Austin	6	6	4	2	6
(United Kingdom) John Paish	1	4	6	6	8

=== Eighth qualifier ===
First round
8	(India) Sashi Menon	4	6	6
(United States) Joel Bailey	6	4	0
(Australia) David Whyte	7	6
(Australia) Bill Gilmour	5	1
(United Kingdom) Jeremy Dier	6	6
(India) Harishanker Krishnan	4	2
(United Kingdom) Harvey Becker	3	4
28	(Australia) Chris Kachel	6	6

Second round
8	(India) Sashi Menon	7	6
(Australia) David Whyte	6	3
(United Kingdom) Jeremy Dier	2	7	7
28	(Australia) Chris Kachel	6	6	9

Qualifying competition
8	(India) Sashi Menon	6	4	3	4
28	(Australia) Chris Kachel	4	6	6	6

=== Ninth qualifier ===
First round
9	(New Zealand) Onny Parun	6	6
(South Africa) Peter Lamb	0	0
(United Kingdom) Keith Gilbert	6	6
(Brazil) Celso Sacomandi	4	2
(United States) Morris Strode	7	7
(United States) David Sherbeck	6	6
(Australia) Craig A. Miller	3	4
19	(Australia) Dale Collings	6	6

Second round
9	(New Zealand) Onny Parun	6	6
(United Kingdom) Keith Gilbert	3	1
(United States) Morris Strode	3	2
19	(Australia) Dale Collings	6	6

Qualifying competition
9	(New Zealand) Onny Parun	7	6	6	7
19	(Australia) Dale Collings	5	7	3	5

=== Tenth qualifier ===
First round
10	(United States) Bill Maze	5	6	3
(United States) Ian Harris	7	4	6
(India) Ashok Amritraj	6	6
(Japan) Nobuya Tamura	2	3
(Republic of Ireland) Matt Doyle	3	6	13
(United Kingdom) John Whiteford	6	3	11
(United Kingdom) Robert Booth	6	3	6
(Mexico) Javier Ordaz	1	6	4

Second round
(United States) Ian Harris	3	4
(India) Ashok Amritraj	6	6
(Republic of Ireland) Matt Doyle	6	7
(United Kingdom) Robert Booth	2	5

Qualifying competition
(India) Ashok Amritraj	1	2	1
(Republic of Ireland) Matt Doyle	6	6	6

=== Eleventh qualifier ===
First round
11	(Republic of Ireland) Sean Sorensen	6	7
(United Kingdom) Stephen Shaw	4	5
(Japan) Jun Kamiwazumi	4	6	6
(Australia) Brian Benson	6	3	3
(India) Nandan Bal	6	6
(New Zealand) Brett Hibbert	2	1
(Australia) Wayne Pascoe	6	7
26	(Colombia) Alejandro Cortes	1	5

Second round
11	(Republic of Ireland) Sean Sorensen	6	5	6
(Japan) Jun Kamiwazumi	4	7	2
(India) Nandan Bal	3	6	7
(Australia) Wayne Pascoe	6	3	5

Qualifying competition
11	(Republic of Ireland) Sean Sorensen	6	4	3	7	6
(India) Nandan Bal	3	6	6	6	4

=== Twelfth qualifier ===
First round
12	(United States) George Hardie	6	6
(Mexico) Juan Hernández	3	2
(United Kingdom) Peter Farrell	6	6
(Sweden) Dan Rastland	2	3
(Australia) Brad Guan	6	7
(United States) Craig Wittus	3	5
(United States) Cary Leeds	3	0
18	(United States) Gene Malin	6	6

Second round
12	(United States) George Hardie	7	6
(United Kingdom) Peter Farrell	5	4
(Australia) Brad Guan	5	6	1
18	(United States) Gene Malin	7	3	6

Qualifying competition
12	(United States) George Hardie	6	6	7	6
18	(United States) Gene Malin	7	2	6	4

=== Thirteenth qualifier ===
First round
13	(India) Ramesh Krishnan	6	6
(Brazil) Jose Martins	1	2
(United States) Charles Strode	6	1	6
(Australia) John Trickey	3	6	1
(United States) Scott McCain	7	4
(Australia) John Marks	6	1^{r}
(Bermuda) Stephen Alger	7	6
29	(United States) Bruce Kleege	5	3

Second round
13	(India) Ramesh Krishnan	6	6
(United States) Charles Strode	0	2
(United States) Scott McCain	5	6	6
(Bermuda) Stephen Alger	7	4	8

Qualifying competition
13	(India) Ramesh Krishnan	7	6	6
(Bermuda) Stephen Alger	5	1	4

=== Fourteenth qualifier ===
First round
14	(South Africa) John Yuill	6	6
(Pakistan) Saeed Meer	3	4
(Ecuador) Raúl Viver	7	6
(Japan) Tsuyoshi Fukui	6	4
(Australia) Alvin Gardiner	7	6	6
(Sweden) Stefan Svensson	5	7	4
(United States) Larry Stefanki	3	1
27	(Australia) Greg Whitecross	6	6

Second round
14	(South Africa) John Yuill	6	6
(Ecuador) Raúl Viver	1	2
(Australia) Alvin Gardiner	3	2
27	(Australia) Greg Whitecross	6	6

Qualifying competition
14	(South Africa) John Yuill	6	6	6	6
27	(Australia) Greg Whitecross	4	1	7	3

=== Fifteenth qualifier ===
First round
15	(South Africa) David Schneider	6	6
(United States) Tracy Delatte	4	4
(United Kingdom) Rohun Beven	6	7
(United States) Craig Edwards	2	6
(Australia) Wayne Hampson	5	7	6
(New Zealand) Chris Gunning	7	5	4
(United States) Eric Sherbeck	4	4
24	(United States) Eric Fromm	6	6

Second round
15	(South Africa) David Schneider	3	6	12
(United Kingdom) Rohun Beven	6	2	10
(Australia) Wayne Hampson	7	7
24	(United States) Eric Fromm	6	5

Qualifying competition
15	(South Africa) David Schneider	3	1	4
(Australia) Wayne Hampson	6	6	6

=== Sixteenth qualifier ===
First round
16	(Finland) Leo Palin	6	6
(Mexico) Alfonso González	3	4
(South Africa) Schalk van der Merwe	6	6
(United States) Cary Stansbury	3	1
(United States) Steve Denton	6	7
(United Kingdom) Kevin Harris	4	5
(United States) Hubertus Hoyt	4	4
30	(South Africa) Eddie Edwards	6	6

Second round
16	(Finland) Leo Palin	6	6
(South Africa) Schalk van der Merwe	2	2
(United States) Steve Denton	6	2	4
30	(South Africa) Eddie Edwards	3	6	6

Qualifying competition
16	(Finland) Leo Palin	7	7	2	1	3
30	(South Africa) Eddie Edwards	6	6	6	6	6
