= 1980 Wimbledon Championships – Women's singles qualifying =

Women's singles qualifying
- 1980 Wimbledon Championships

Events
Singles	men	women		boys	girls
Doubles	men	women	mixed	boys	girls
WC Singles	men	women	quad
WC Doubles	men	women	quad
Legends	men	women	seniors

Qualification
Singles	men	women
Doubles	men	women	mixed
- Wimbledon Championships

Players who neither had high enough rankings nor received wild cards to enter the main draw of the annual Wimbledon Tennis Championships participated in a qualifying tournament held one week before the event.

== Qualifiers ==
1. (Australia) Jenny Walker
2. (Australia) Pam Whytcross
3. (Australia) Nerida Gregory
4. (United States) Lele Forood
5. (United States) Lea Antonoplis
6. (Canada) Marjorie Blackwood
7. (Australia) Sue Saliba
8. (United States) Andrea Buchanan

== Qualifying draw ==
Key

- Q = Qualifier
- WC = Wild card
- LL = Lucky loser
- Alt = Alternate
- ITF = ITF entry
- PR = Protected ranking
- SR = Special ranking
- SE = Special exempt
- JE = Junior exempt
- JR = Junior Accelerator Programme entrant
- CO = College Accelerator Programme entrant
- NG = Next Gen Accelerator Program entrant
- w/o = Walkover
- r = Retired
- d = Defaulted

=== First qualifier ===
First round
1	(Australia) Jenny Walker	6	7
8	(Australia) Julie Harrison	4	6
4	(Australia) Susan Leo	6	6
5	(Netherlands) Jeske Van Erven	1	3
2	(Belgium) Monique Gurdal	6	2	7
7	(Australia) Kerryn Pratt	4	6	5
3	(United States) Kathleen Horvath	6	6
6	(United Kingdom) Sally Reeves	2	2

Second round
(Australia) Jenny Walker	7	6	6
(Australia) Susan Leo	5	7	2
(Belgium) Monique Gurdal	5	6	7
(United States) Kathleen Horvath	7	2	5

Qualifying competition
(Australia) Jenny Walker	6	6
(Belgium) Monique Gurdal	4	2

=== Second qualifier ===
First round
1	(Australia) Pam Whytcross	6	6
8	(Argentina) Raquel Giscafré	3	2
4	(Argentina) Claudia Casabianca	6	7
5	(United Kingdom) Clare Harrison	4	6
2	(Netherlands) Mariëtte Pakker	6	6
7	(France) Sylvie Provoust	1	1
3	(United Kingdom) Belinda Thompson	6	6
6	(United States) Penny Johnson	3	2

Second round
(Australia) Pam Whytcross	6	6
(Argentina) Claudia Casabianca	3	3
(Netherlands) Mariëtte Pakker	6	6
(United Kingdom) Belinda Thompson	1	2

Qualifying competition
(Australia) Pam Whytcross	6	6
(Netherlands) Mariëtte Pakker	4	4

=== Third qualifier ===
First round
1	(Australia) Nerida Gregory	6	3	6
8	(New Zealand) Brenda Perry	0	6	4
4	(Argentina) Adriana Villagrán	6	6
5	(Germany) Claudia Kohde-Kilsch	2	3
2	(Canada) Karen Dewis	6	6	6
7	(United States) Betsy Blaney	7	2	4
3	(United States) Felicia Hutnick	6	6
6	(France) Caroline Franch	3	1

Second round
(Australia) Nerida Gregory	4	7	6
(Argentina) Adriana Villagrán	6	6	2
(Canada) Karen Dewis	6	6	6
(United States) Felicia Hutnick	7	3	4

Qualifying competition
(Australia) Nerida Gregory	6	6
(Canada) Karen Dewis	2	1

=== Fourth qualifier ===
First round
1	(United States) Lele Forood	7	6
8	(United Kingdom) Cathy Drury	6	4
4	(Brazil) Cláudia Monteiro	2	6	6
5	(United Kingdom) Deborah Stewart	6	2	4
2	(Brazil) Gláucia Langela	6	7
7	(Italy) Patrizia Murgo	2	5
3	(Australia) Debbie Freeman	7	2	6
6	(United States) Candy Reynolds	5	6	1

Second round
(United States) Lele Forood	7	6
(Brazil) Cláudia Monteiro	6	3
(Brazil) Gláucia Langela	3	7	6
(Australia) Debbie Freeman	6	5	0

Qualifying competition
(United States) Lele Forood	6	5	6
(Brazil) Gláucia Langela	3	7	3

=== Fifth qualifier ===
First round
1	(United States) Lea Antonoplis	4	6	6
8	(United Kingdom) Debbie Parker	6	2	3
4	(Japan) Naoko Sato	2	6	6
5	(Argentina) Liliana Giussani	6	3	3
2	(United States) Ann Henricksson	6	6
7	(Australia) Mary Sawyer	2	4

Second round
(United States) Lea Antonoplis	7	6
(Japan) Naoko Sato	5	3
(United States) Ann Henricksson	6	6
(Netherlands) Nanette Schutte	1	0

Qualifying competition
(United States) Lea Antonoplis	6	5	6
(United States) Ann Henricksson	0	7	3

=== Sixth qualifier ===
First round
1	(Canada) Marjorie Blackwood	6	6
8	(Australia) Elizabeth Little	4	3
4	(Australia) Chris O'Neil	6	6
5	(Australia) Brenda Catton	4	4
2	(Switzerland) Petra Jauch-Delhees	6	6
7	(Australia) Anne Minter	3	4
3	(United Kingdom) Jane Plackett	7	6
6	(Italy) P. Joly	5	2

Second round
(Canada) Marjorie Blackwood	6	7
(Australia) Chris O'Neil	3	6
(Switzerland) Petra Jauch-Delhees	6	6
(United Kingdom) Jane Plackett	3	3

Qualifying competition
(Canada) Marjorie Blackwood	3	6	8
(Switzerland) Petra Jauch-Delhees	6	3	6

=== Seventh qualifier ===
First round
1	(Australia) Sue Saliba	6	7
8	(Chile) Silvana Urroz	3	5
4	(United States) Kim Jones	6	6
5	(Canada) Nina Bland	4	2
2	(Czechoslovakia) Hana Strachoňová	6	6
7	(Canada) Wendy Barlow	2	3
3	(Australia) Karen Gulley	6	6
6	(Netherlands) Karen Moos	3	1

Second round
(Australia) Sue Saliba	6	6
(United States) Kim Jones	3	1
(Czechoslovakia) Hana Strachoňová	6	6
(Australia) Karen Gulley	1	1

Qualifying competition
(Australia) Sue Saliba	3	6	6
(Czechoslovakia) Hana Strachoňová	6	1	4

=== Eighth qualifier ===
First round
1	(United States) Andrea Buchanan	6	6	6
8	(Switzerland) Isabelle Villiger	4	7	2
4	(United States) Anne Guerrant	6	6
5	(United Kingdom) Liz Jones	0	2
2	(Australia) Cynthia Doerner	6	6
7	(United Kingdom) Joy Tacon	2	4
3	(Spain) Carmen Perea-Alcala	6	7
6	(Sweden) Mimmi Wikstedt	2	6

Second round
(United States) Andrea Buchanan	3	7	6
(United States) Anne Guerrant	6	6	4
(Australia) Cynthia Doerner	6	6
(Spain) Carmen Perea-Alcala	1	2

Qualifying competition
(United States) Andrea Buchanan	5	7	6
(Australia) Cynthia Doerner	7	6	2
