= 1979 ABN World Tennis Tournament =

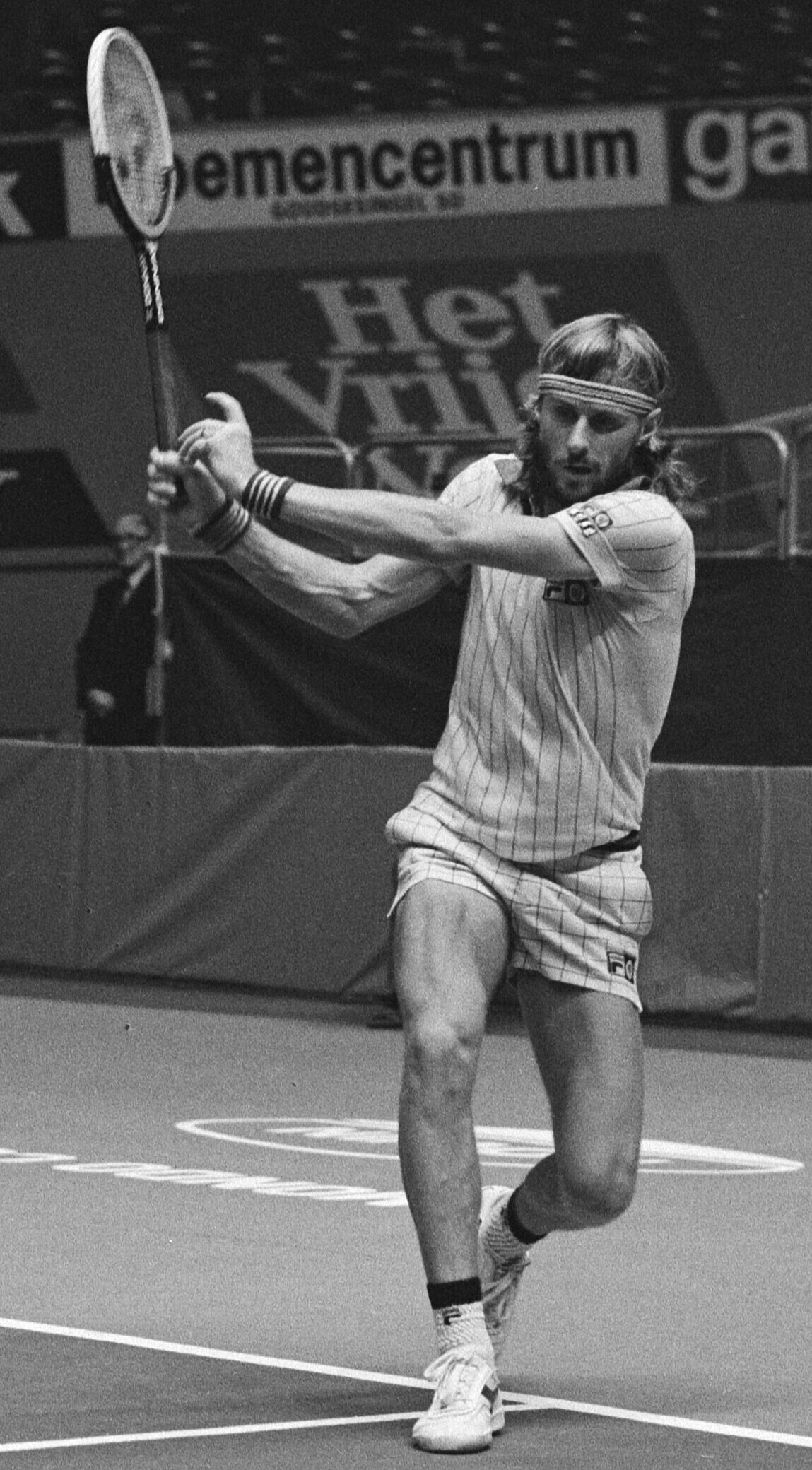
- Date: 2–8 April
- Edition: 7th
- Category: Grand Prix circuit
- Draw: 32S / 16D
- Prize money: $175,000
- Surface: Carpet / indoor
- Location: Rotterdam, Netherlands
- Venue: Rotterdam Ahoy

Champions

Singles
- (Sweden) Björn Borg

Doubles
- (United States) Peter Fleming / (United States) John McEnroe
- ABN World Tennis Tournament

The 1979 ABN World Tennis Tournament was a men's tennis tournament played on indoor carpet courts at Rotterdam Ahoy in the Netherlands. The event was part of the 1979 Colgate-Palmolive Grand Prix circuit. It was the seventh edition of the tournament and was held from 2 April through 8 April 1979. First-seeded Björn Borg won the singles title.

== Finals ==
=== Singles ===
(Sweden) Björn Borg defeated (United States) John McEnroe 6–4, 6–2

- It was Borg's 3rd singles title of the year and the 42nd of his career.

=== Doubles ===
(United States) Peter Fleming / (United States) John McEnroe defeated (Switzerland) Heinz Günthardt / (South Africa) Bernard Mitton 6–4, 6–4

== See also ==
- Borg–McEnroe rivalry
