= Peter Dellavedova =

Australian tennis player

- Country (sports): Australia

Singles
- Highest ranking: No. 482 (4 Jan 1981)

Grand Slam singles results
- Australian Open: Q2 (1978)
- Wimbledon: Q2 (1980)

Doubles
- Career record: 0–2
- Highest ranking: No. 752 (2 Jan 1984)

Grand Slam doubles results
- Wimbledon: 1R (1980)

Peter Dellavedova (born 1961) is an Australian former professional tennis player.

Active on the professional tour in the 1980s, Dellavedova had a best singles ranking of 482. His career included a men's doubles main draw appearance at the 1980 Wimbledon Championships, where he also featured in singles qualifying and had a win over Jan Gunnarsson. He is a relative of basketballer Matthew Dellavedova, as a first cousin of Matthew's father. His son, also named Matthew, is a professional tennis player.
