= 1979 Australian Open – Women's singles qualifying =

Women's singles qualifying
- 1979 Australian Open

Events
Singles	men	women		boys	girls
Doubles	men	women	mixed	boys	girls
WC Singles	men	women	quad
WC Doubles	men	women	quad
Legends	men	women	mixed

Qualification
Singles	men	women
- Australian Open

This article displays the qualifying draw for women's singles at the 1979 Australian Open.

== Seeds ==
1. (Australia) Cathy Griffiths (qualifying competition, lucky loser)
2. (United States) Mary-Ann Colville (qualifying competition)
3. (Australia) Merrilyn Robinson (second round)
4. (Australia) Pamela Baily (first round)
5. (Australia) Karen Gulley (qualifying competition)
6. (New Zealand) Chris Newton (qualified)
7. (Australia) Debbie Freeman (second round)
8. (Australia) Anne Minter (qualified)

== Qualifiers ==
1. (Australia) Anne Minter
2. (Australia) Bernadette Randall
3. (New Zealand) Chris Newton
4. (Australia) Brenda Catton

== Lucky losers ==
1. (Australia) Cathy Griffiths

== Qualifying draw ==
Key

- Q = Qualifier
- WC = Wild card
- LL = Lucky loser
- Alt = Alternate
- ITF = ITF entry
- PR = Protected ranking
- SR = Special ranking
- SE = Special exempt
- JE = Junior exempt
- JR = Junior Accelerator Programme entrant
- CO = College Accelerator Programme entrant
- NG = Next Gen Accelerator Program entrant
- w/o = Walkover
- r = Retired
- d = Defaulted

=== First qualifier ===
First round
1	(Australia) Cathy Griffiths	6	6
(Australia) Maree Booth	1	3
(Australia) Gwen Stirton	6	6
(Australia) Susan Kreymborg	2	2
(Australia) Sharon Pinchbeck	2	3
(Australia) Miranda Yates	6	6
(Australia) Debbie Chesterton	0	6	2
8	(Australia) Anne Minter	6	2	6

Second round
1	(Australia) Cathy Griffiths	6	6
(Australia) Gwen Stirton	1	4
(Australia) Miranda Yates	1	1
8	(Australia) Anne Minter	6	6

Qualifying competition
1	(Australia) Cathy Griffiths	4	5
8	(Australia) Anne Minter	6	7

=== Second qualifier ===
First round
4	(Australia) Pamela Baily	2	3
(Australia) Bernadette Randall	6	6
(Canada) Lisette Senn	6	6
(Australia) Helen Middleton	3	2
(Australia) Helen Luscombe	4	1
(Australia) Karen Denman	6	6
(Australia) Jenny Combs	0	2
5	(Australia) Karen Gulley	6	6

Second round
(Australia) Bernadette Randall	6	6
(Canada) Lisette Senn	3	3
(Australia) Karen Denman	5	6
5	(Australia) Karen Gulley	7	7

Qualifying competition
(Australia) Bernadette Randall	6	5	7
5	(Australia) Karen Gulley	3	7	5

=== Third qualifier ===
First round
6	(New Zealand) Chris Newton	6	3	6
(Australia) Jackie Monsour	3	6	2
(Australia) Jackie Pinto	4	6	6
(Australia) G. Wilson	6	3	4
(Australia) Annette Gulley	3	5
(United Kingdom) Jane Plackett	6	7
(Australia) Julie Peters	6	2	1
3	(Australia) Merrilyn Robinson	3	6	6

Second round
6	(New Zealand) Chris Newton	6	6
(Australia) Jackie Pinto	1	1
(United Kingdom) Jane Plackett	3	6	9
3	(Australia) Merrilyn Robinson	6	3	7

Qualifying competition
6	(New Zealand) Chris Newton	5	6	8
(United Kingdom) Jane Plackett	7	0	6

=== Fourth qualifier ===
First round
7	(Australia) Debbie Freeman	6	0	6
(Australia) Kathy Mantle	4	6	3
(Australia) Brenda Catton	6	6
(Australia) Nancy Harris	0	0
(Australia) Lili Bell	0	4
(Australia) Kerrie Byrne	6	6
(United States) Julie Filkoff	1	4
2	(United States) Mary-Ann Colville	6	6

Second round
7	(Australia) Debbie Freeman	7	1	4
(Australia) Brenda Catton	5	6	6
(Australia) Kerrie Byrne	6	4
2	(United States) Mary-Ann Colville	7	6

Qualifying competition
(Australia) Brenda Catton	6	6
2	(United States) Mary-Ann Colville	0	0
