= 1980 Wimbledon Championships – Men's singles final =

1980 tennis match

Wimbledon 1980 Men's Final
- (Sweden) Björn Borg (1) vs. (United States) John McEnroe (2)
Set	1	2	3	4	5
(Sweden) Björn Borg	1	7	6	6^{16}	8
(United States) John McEnroe	6	5	3	7^{18}	6
- Date: Saturday, 5 July 1980
- Tournament: The Championships, Wimbledon
- Location: Centre Court, All England Lawn Tennis and Croquet Club, Wimbledon, London, England
- Chair umpire: Peter Harvey
- Duration: 3 hours 53 minutes

The 1980 Wimbledon Championships Men's Singles final was the championship tennis match of the gentlemen's singles tournament at the 1980 Wimbledon Championships. After 3 hours and 53 minutes of play, the four-time defending champion Björn Borg defeated John McEnroe 1–6, 7–5, 6–3, 6–7^{(16–18)}, 8–6 to win the match. McEnroe saved seven championship points during the match but ultimately lost to Borg in what was regarded at the time as the greatest tennis match ever played (it would later be compared to the 2008 men's singles final between Roger Federer and Rafael Nadal).

== Match ==
The match was eagerly awaited as not only was it a clash between the top two seeds, it was also viewed as a meeting of opposites:

Borg was the Iceman, a ruthless baseliner who used his racket to probe other players' weaknesses like a surgeon wielding a scalpel. McEnroe was the Brat, a modern genius in the old-fashioned craft of serve and volley, who often gave the impression that his real opponent was the umpire, or himself, or anyone other than the person standing on the other side of the net.

At the start of the final, McEnroe was booed by the crowd as he entered Centre Court, because of the heated exchanges he had had with officials during his semi-final victory over Jimmy Connors.

In the final's fourth-set tiebreaker that lasted 20 minutes, McEnroe saved five championship points and eventually won 18–16. The tie-break was later described by one reporter as "the most riveting episode in the sport's history". McEnroe, however, could not break Borg's serve in the fifth set, which the Swede won 8–6.

== Significance ==
This match was called the best Wimbledon final by ESPN's countdown show "Who's Number One?" and "one of the three or four greatest sporting events in history" by ESPN English speaking personality Mike Greenberg. In 1999, it ranked #10 on ESPN's SportsCentury's Ten Greatest Games of the 20th Century. In a 2002 UK poll conducted by Channel 4, the British public voted the match #10 in the list of the 100 Greatest Sporting Moments. The New York Times tennis writer Neil Amdur wrote in 2011: "I covered the 1980 Wimbledon men’s singles final between McEnroe and Borg. Until the 2008 Nadal–Federer classic at the All England Club, the Borg–McEnroe five-setter at Wimbledon was the greatest tennis match I had ever seen, but after watching chunks of the 3:53 McEnroe–Borg final at an HBO screening, I am tempted again to reaffirm its place as the sport’s single most compelling piece of court magic".

== See also ==
- Borg–McEnroe rivalry
- Borg/McEnroe (2017 film)
