= Nina Bland =

Canadian athlete

- Country (sports): Canada
- Born: April 21, 1959 (age 65)
- Plays: Right-handed

Singles
- Career record: 1–4 (Federation Cup)

Grand Slam singles results
- French Open: Q1 (1980)
- Wimbledon: Q1 (1980)

Nina Bland (born April 21, 1959) is a Canadian former professional tennis player.

A Canadian Federation Cup representative, Bland played singles in five ties between 1979 and 1981. Her only win, against Frédérique Thibault in 1980, helped Canada defeat France in the final of the consolation rounds.

While a student at UC Berkeley she played varsity tennis.

Bland, who is qualified as a physician, has been married to orthopedic surgeon and former Canadian Medical Association president Dr. Brian Day since the 1990s and they have four children together.

== See also ==
- List of Canada Fed Cup team representatives
