= Coral Beach Invitation =

Coral Beach Club Invitation Coral Beach Invitation

Defunct tennis tournament
- Tour: ILTF North American Circuit
- Founded: 1940; 85 years ago
- Abolished: 1978; 47 years ago
- Location: Warwick, Bermuda.
- Venue: Coral Beach Club
- Surface: Clay – outdoors

The Coral Beach Invitation also known as the Coral Beach Club Invitation was combined tennis tournament played on green clay courts at the Coral Beach Club resort, Warwick, Bermuda. It was founded in 1940 and ran annually until 1978 when it was discontinued. The tournament was part of the ILTF North American Circuit.

== History ==
In 1939, the first two ‘Bermuda Clay’ courts were laid down (now Har-Tru). A few months later in 1940 the invitation tournament was held. The winner of the men's singles, W. Donald McNeill, the same year, won the United States Lawn Tennis Championship at Forest Hills. The first lady champion, Miss Gracyn Wheeler, defeated Mrs. Sarah Palfrey Cooke who later also at Forest Hills. The tournament was part of the ILTF North American Circuit.

== Finals ==
=== Men's Singles ===
(incomplete roll)

Year	Winner	Runner-up	Score
1940	(United States) Don McNeill	(United States) Elwood Thomas Cooke	6–8, 6–4, 6–4, 6–4.
1952	(United States) Vic Seixas	(Mexico) Gustavo Palafox	6–4, 9–7, 6–3.
1953	(United States) Don McNeill	(Canada) Lorne Main	7–5, 6–4, 6–2.
1966	(United States) Bill Tym	(United States) Ellis Slack	6–4, 6–1.
1979	(Bermuda) Stephen Alger	(United States) King Van Nostrand	6–2, 6–1.

=== Women's Singles ===
(incomplete roll)

Year	Winner	Runner-up	Score
1940	(United States) Gracyn Wheeler	(United States) Sarah Palfrey Cooke	10–8, 6–3
1953	(United States) Louise Brough	(Australia) Thelma Coyne Long	6–3, 6–4
1961	(United States) Dottie Head Knode	(United States) Barbara Scofield Davidson	6–1, 7–5
1970	(United States) Sally Fuller	(United States) Kay Hubbell	6–2, 6–1
