= Borg–McEnroe rivalry =

Tennis rivalry

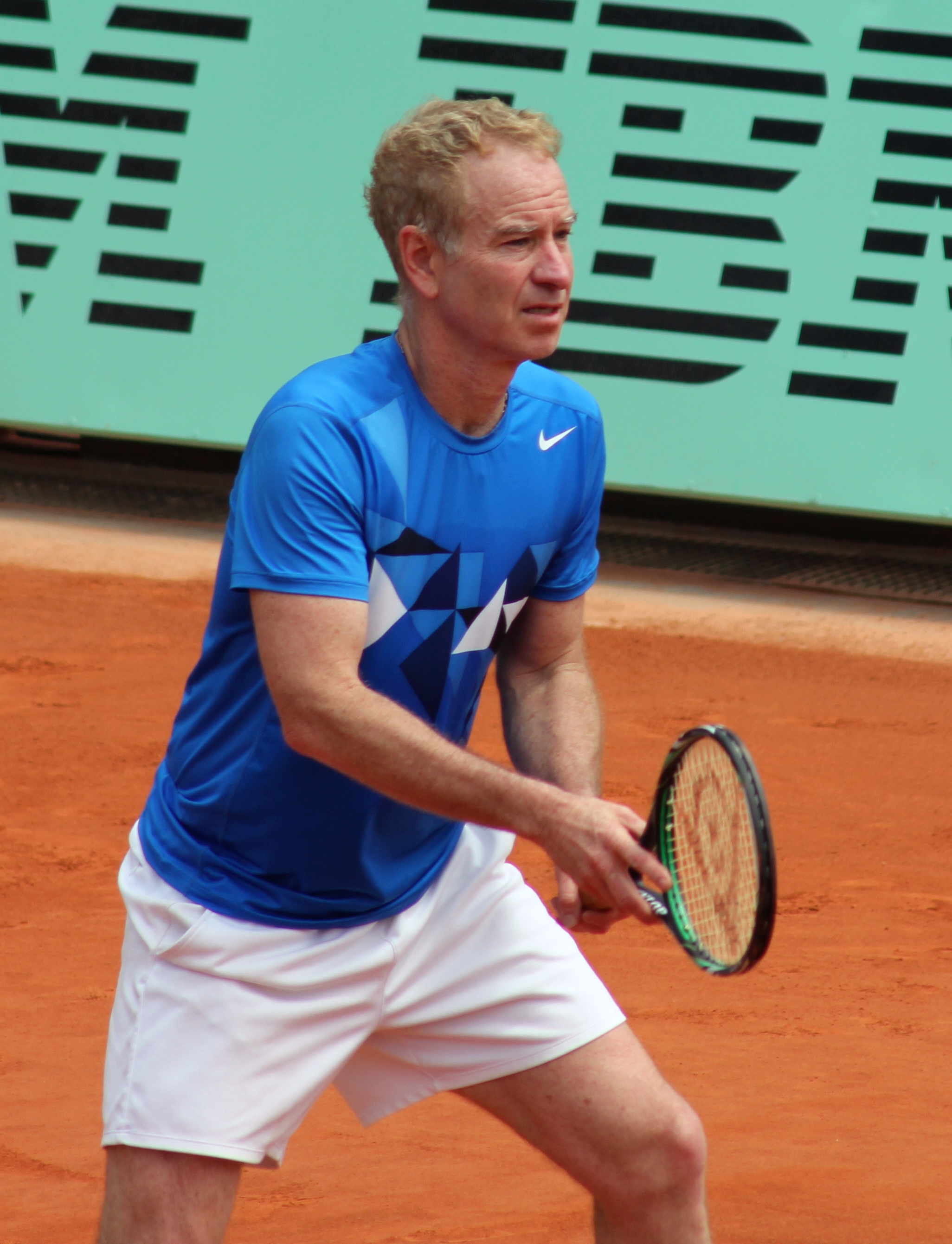
John McEnroe (7 Major singles titles, world No.1 for 170 weeks; pictured in 2012)

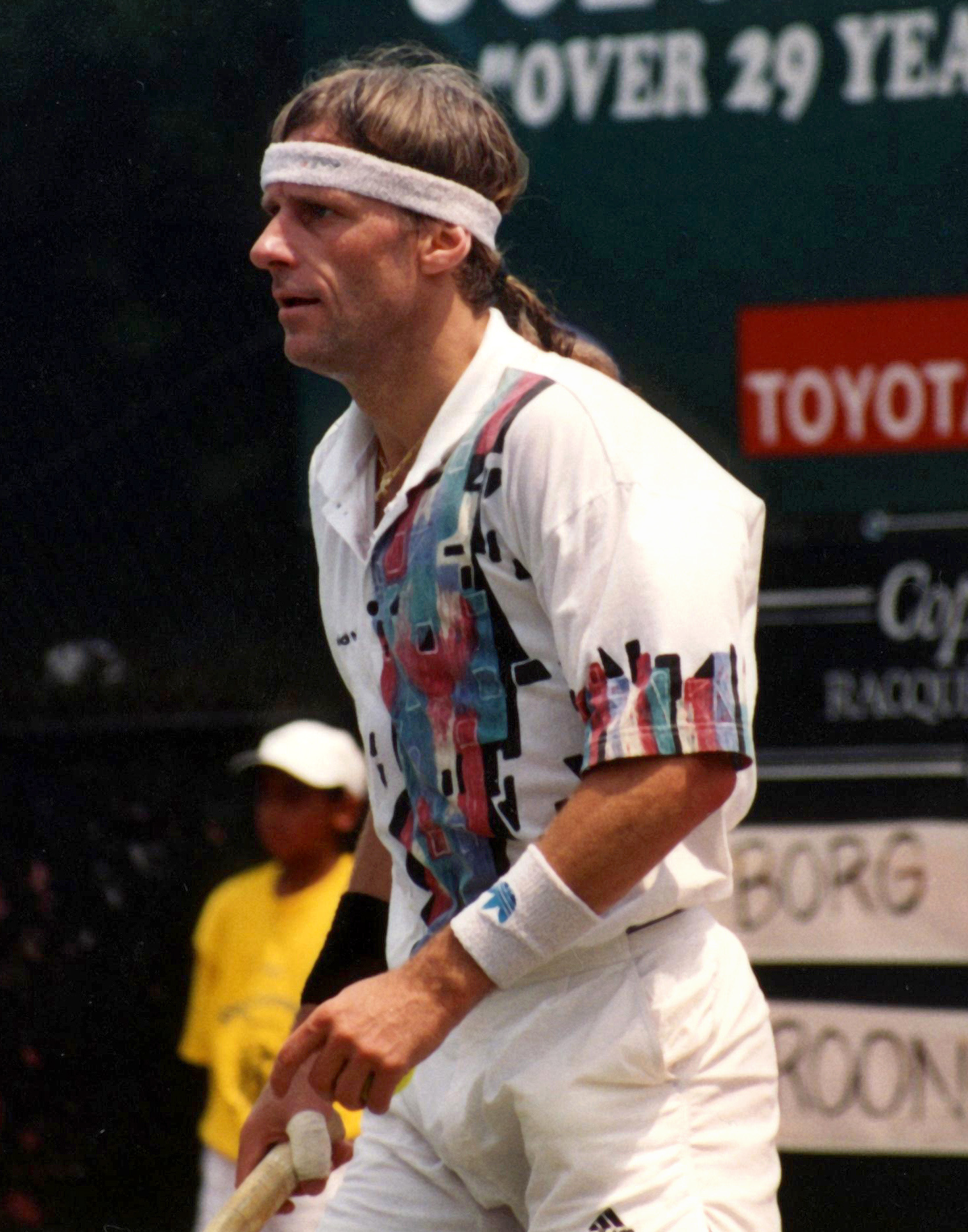
Björn Borg (11 Major singles titles, world No.1 for 109 weeks; pictured in 1991)

Björn Borg and John McEnroe had a tennis rivalry. They met 14 times on the regular tour and 22 times in total between November 1978 and September 1981. Their head-to-head was even at 7–7. Their on-court rivalry was highlighted by their contrasting temperaments and playing styles: the Swede Borg was known for his cool and emotionless demeanor on court, while the American McEnroe was famed for his court-side tantrums. As a result, their rivalry was described as "Fire and Ice". They were tied in their five-set matches at 1–1.

In 1980, McEnroe reached the singles final at Wimbledon for the first time, where he faced Borg, who was aiming for an Open Era record fifth consecutive Wimbledon title. At the start of the final McEnroe was booed by the crowd as he entered Centre Court following his heated exchanges with officials during his semi-final clash with Jimmy Connors. In a fourth set tie-breaker that lasted 20 minutes, McEnroe saved five match points (seven altogether in that set) and eventually won 18–16. However, he was unable to break Borg's serve in the fifth set and Borg went on to win 8–6. This match is widely considered one of the best tennis matches ever played. McEnroe then defeated Borg at the US Open final the same year in five sets, which is also considered one of the best matches ever.

In 1981, McEnroe returned to Wimbledon and again faced Borg in the singles final. This time it was the American who prevailed and defeated Borg to end the Swede's run of 41 straight match victories at the All England Club. At the US Open in the same season, McEnroe was again victorious, winning in four sets, after which Borg walked off the court and out of the stadium before the ceremonies and press conference had begun. Borg retired shortly afterwards, having never won the US Open despite reaching four finals. Their final confrontation came in 1983 in Tokyo at the Suntory Cup (invitational tournament), with Borg prevailing in three sets.

After their retirements, Borg and McEnroe grew a more friendly relationship. In March 2006, when Bonhams Auction House in London announced that it would auction Borg's Wimbledon trophies and two of his winning rackets on 21 June 2006, McEnroe called from New York and asked Borg, "What's up? Have you gone mad?" The conversation with McEnroe, along with pleas from Jimmy Connors and Andre Agassi, eventually persuaded Borg to buy out the trophies from Bonhams at an undisclosed amount.

== Head-to-head ==
Legend	Borg	McEnroe
Grand Slam	1	3
Masters Grand Prix	2	0
WCT Finals	0	1
ATP International Series	4	3
Total	7	7

=== Official matches (14) ===
Borg 7 – McEnroe 7

No.	Date	Tournament	Surface	Round	Winner	Score	Borg	McEnroe
1.	Nov 1978	Stockholm Open	Hard (i)	Semifinals	McEnroe	6–3, 6–4	0	1
2.	Feb 1979	Richmond WCT	Carpet	Semifinals	Borg	4–6, 7–6^{(10–8)}, 6–3	1	1
3.	Mar 1979	New Orleans Grand Prix	Carpet	Semifinals	McEnroe	5–7, 6–1, 7–6^{(8–6)}	1	2
4.	Apr 1979	Rotterdam Open	Carpet	Final	Borg	6–4, 6–2	2	2
5.	May 1979	WCT Finals	Carpet	Final	McEnroe	7–5, 4–6, 6–2, 7–6^{(7–5)}	2	3
6.	Aug 1979	Canadian Open	Hard	Final	Borg	6–3, 6–3	3	3
7.	Jan 1980	Masters Grand Prix	Carpet	Semifinals	Borg	6–7^{(5–7)}, 6–3, 7–6^{(7–1)}	4	3
8.	Jul 1980	Wimbledon	Grass	Final	Borg	1–6, 7–5, 6–3, 6–7^{(16–18)}, 8–6	5	3
9.	Sep 1980	US Open	Hard	Final	McEnroe	7–6^{(7–4)}, 6–1, 6–7^{(5–7)}, 5–7, 6–4	5	4
10.	Nov 1980	Stockholm Open	Carpet	Final	Borg	6–3, 6–4	6	4
11.	Jan 1981	Masters Grand Prix	Carpet	Round Robin	Borg	6–4, 6–7^{(3–7)}, 7–6^{(7–2)}	7	4
12.	Mar 1981	Milan Indoor	Carpet	Final	McEnroe	7–6^{(7–2)}, 6–4	7	5
13.	Jul 1981	Wimbledon	Grass	Final	McEnroe	4–6, 7–6^{(7–1)}, 7–6^{(7–4)}, 6–4	7	6
14.	Sep 1981	US Open	Hard	Final	McEnroe	4–6, 6–2, 6–4, 6–3	7	7

== Breakdown of their rivalry ==
- All matches: (14) Tied 7–7
- All finals: McEnroe 5–4
  - Hard courts: McEnroe 3–1
  - Carpet courts: Borg 5–3
  - Grass courts: Tied 1–1
  - Grand Slam matches: McEnroe 3–1
  - Grand Slam finals: McEnroe 3–1
  - Masters matches: Borg 2–0
  - Masters finals: None
  - Davis Cup matches: None
  - WCT Finals matches: McEnroe 1–0

== Other matches ==
=== Invitational matches ===
Borg–McEnroe (4–4)

No.	Date	Tournament	Surface	Round	Winner	Score	Ref.
1.	Mar 1979	Velo Tennis Cup	Carpet	Final	Borg	3–6, 6–1, 6–4	
2.	Nov 1979	Brooklyn Masters	Carpet	Final	Borg	1–6, 6–1, 6–4	
3.	Feb 1981	Molson Light Challenge	Carpet	Semifinals	McEnroe	6–3, 3–6, 7–6^{(10–8)}	
4.	Nov 1982	Swan Lager Super Challenge	Carpet	Final	McEnroe	6–1, 6–4	
5.	Nov 1982	AKAI Gold Challenge	Carpet	Round Robin	Borg	3–6, 6–4, 7–5, 6–2	
6.	Nov 1982	Europe vs. Americas Challenge	Carpet	Round Robin	McEnroe	6–3, 2–6, 6–4	
7.	Dec 1982	European Community Championship	Carpet	Semifinals	McEnroe	2–6, 6–4, 6–3	
8.	Apr 1983	Suntory Cup	Carpet	Semifinals	Borg	6–4, 2–6, 6–2	

=== Exhibitions ===
Borg–McEnroe (2–1)

No.	Date	Tournament	Surface	Round	Winner	Score
1.	Feb 1981	Benson & Hedges Challenge	Indoor	–	Borg	6–0, 6–4
2.	Feb 1981	Benson & Hedges Challenge	Indoor	–	Borg	6–2, 6–4
3.	Feb 1981	Benson & Hedges Challenge	Outdoor	Final	McEnroe	6–4, 1–6, 7–6, 6–4

== See also ==
- Borg vs McEnroe – movie
- Borg–Connors rivalry
- Lendl–McEnroe rivalry
- List of tennis rivalries
