= 1979 ABN World Tennis Tournament – Doubles =

Doubles
- 1979 ABN World Tennis Tournament

Final
- Champion: (United States) Peter Fleming (United States) John McEnroe
- Runner-up: (Switzerland) Heinz Günthardt (South Africa) Bernard Mitton
- Score: 6–4, 6–4

Details
- Draw: 15
- Seeds: 4

Events
Singles	Doubles
- ABN World Tennis Tournament

The 1979 ABN World Tennis Tournament – Doubles was an event of the 1979 ABN World Tennis Tournament tennis tournament and was played on indoor carpet courts at Rotterdam Ahoy in the Netherlands, between 2 April and 8 April 1979. The draw consisted of 15 teams and four of them were seeded. Fred McNair and Raúl Ramírez were the defending Milan Indoor doubles champions but did not compete together in this edition. The second-seeded team of Peter Fleming and John McEnroe won the doubles title after a win in the final against unseeded pairing Heinz Günthardt and Bernard Mitton, 6–4, 6–4.

== Seeds ==
1. (Poland) Wojciech Fibak / (Netherlands) Tom Okker (First round)
2. (United States) Peter Fleming / (United States) John McEnroe (Champions)
3. (South Africa) Frew McMillan / (United States) Fred McNair (First round)
4. (Australia) Bob Carmichael / (United States) Brian Teacher (Quarterfinals)

== Draw ==
Key

- Q = Qualifier
- WC = Wild card
- LL = Lucky loser
- Alt = Alternate
- ITF = ITF entry
- PR = Protected ranking
- SR = Special ranking
- SE = Special exempt
- JE = Junior exempt
- JR = Junior Accelerator Programme entrant
- CO = College Accelerator Programme entrant
- NG = Next Gen Accelerator Program entrant
- w/o = Walkover
- r = Retired
- d = Defaulted

First Round
1	(Poland) Wojciech Fibak (Netherlands) Tom Okker	6	3	6
(United States) Pat DuPré (United States) Gene Mayer	3	6	7
(Socialist Federal Republic of Yugoslavia) Željko Franulović (Zimbabwe) Andrew Pattison	3	6
(United Kingdom) John Feaver (United Kingdom) Buster Mottram	6	7
4	(Australia) Bob Carmichael (United States) Brian Teacher	7	6
(United Kingdom) Mark Cox (United Kingdom) David Lloyd	6	2
(Switzerland) Heinz Günthardt (South Africa) Bernard Mitton	6	6
(Australia) Paul Kronk (Australia) Cliff Letcher	2	4
(India) Anand Amritraj (India) Vijay Amritraj	6	7	6
3	(South Africa) Frew McMillan (United States) Fred McNair	7	6	3
(United States) Steve Wilson (United States) Wyatt
(United States) Johan Kriek (Australia) Geoff Masters	w/o
(Republic of Ireland) Sean Sorensen (Netherlands) Paul van Min	2	4
2	(United States) Peter Fleming (United States) John McEnroe	6	6

Quarterfinals
(United States) Pat DuPré (United States) Gene Mayer	6	6
(United Kingdom) John Feaver (United Kingdom) Buster Mottram	4	2
4	(Australia) Bob Carmichael (United States) Brian Teacher	4	6
(Switzerland) Heinz Günthardt (South Africa) Bernard Mitton	6	7
(Netherlands) Louk Sanders (Netherlands) Rolf Thung	0	3
(India) Anand Amritraj (India) Vijay Amritraj	6	6
(United States) Johan Kriek (Australia) Geoff Masters	2	3
2	(United States) Peter Fleming (United States) John McEnroe	6	6

Semifinals
(United States) Pat DuPré (United States) Gene Mayer	4	2
(Switzerland) Heinz Günthardt (South Africa) Bernard Mitton	6	6
(India) Anand Amritraj (India) Vijay Amritraj	6	3	2
2	(United States) Peter Fleming (United States) John McEnroe	2	6	6

Final
(Switzerland) Heinz Günthardt (South Africa) Bernard Mitton	4	4
2	(United States) Peter Fleming (United States) John McEnroe	6	6
