= 1978 Australian Open – Men's singles qualifying =

Men's singles qualifying
- 1978 Australian Open

Events
Singles	men	women		boys	girls
Doubles	men	women	mixed	boys	girls
WC Singles	men	women	quad
WC Doubles	men	women	quad
Legends	men	women	mixed

Qualification
Singles	men	women
- Australian Open

This article displays the qualifying draw for men's singles at the 1978 Australian Open.

== Seeds ==
1. (India) Ramesh Krishnan (qualified)
2. (United Kingdom) Andrew Jarrett (qualified)
3. (Australia) Noel Phillips (qualified)
4. (Australia) Dale Collings (qualified)
5. (Australia) Warren Maher (qualified)
6. (United States) Cary Stansbury (qualified)
7. (Finland) Leo Palin (qualified)
8. (United States) Jai DiLouie (qualified)

== Qualifiers ==
1. (India) Ramesh Krishnan
2. (United Kingdom) Andrew Jarrett
3. (Australia) Noel Phillips
4. (Australia) Dale Collings
5. (Australia) Warren Maher
6. (United States) Cary Stansbury
7. (Finland) Leo Palin
8. (United States) Jai DiLouie

== Qualifying draw ==
Key

- Q = Qualifier
- WC = Wild card
- LL = Lucky loser
- Alt = Alternate
- ITF = ITF entry
- PR = Protected ranking
- SR = Special ranking
- SE = Special exempt
- JE = Junior exempt
- JR = Junior Accelerator Programme entrant
- CO = College Accelerator Programme entrant
- NG = Next Gen Accelerator Program entrant
- w/o = Walkover
- r = Retired
- d = Defaulted

=== First qualifier ===
First round
1	(India) Ramesh Krishnan	6	5	6
(Australia) Paul Dougherty	4	7	2
(Australia) Eddie Myers	6	6
(Australia) Steve Wood	3	3
(Australia) Paul Gaff	2	1
(Australia) Matt Lemke	6	6
(Australia) J. Reid	1	2
(Australia) Greg Braun	6	6

Second round
1	(India) Ramesh Krishnan	7	6
(Australia) Eddie Myers	5	4
(Australia) Matt Lemke	4	2
(Australia) Greg Braun	6	6

Qualifying competition
1	(India) Ramesh Krishnan	2	6	6
(Australia) Greg Braun	6	3	2

=== Second qualifier ===
First round
2	(United Kingdom) Andrew Jarrett	6	6
(Australia) D. Kramer	1	2
(Australia) Keith Begley	6	1	6
(Australia) Steven McInnes	3	6	4
(Australia) T. Francis	1	0
(New Zealand) Brett Hibbert	6	6
(Australia) R. Rali	4	1
(United States) Guy Fritz	6	6

Second round
2	(United Kingdom) Andrew Jarrett	6	6
(Australia) Keith Begley	3	0
(New Zealand) Brett Hibbert	1	1
(United States) Guy Fritz	6	6

Qualifying competition
2	(United Kingdom) Andrew Jarrett	6	6
(United States) Guy Fritz	4	2

=== Third qualifier ===
First round
3	(Australia) Noel Phillips	6	6
(United States) Andy Kohlberg	2	4
(New Zealand) Chris Gunning	6	7
(Australia) Kevin Green	2	6
(Australia) King Koi	1	2
(Australia) Peter Della Vedova	6	6
(Australia) Trevor Little	7	3	4
(Canada) Harry Fritz	6	6	6

Second round
3	(Australia) Noel Phillips	6	6
(New Zealand) Chris Gunning	3	4
(Australia) Peter Della Vedova	4	6
(Canada) Harry Fritz	6	7

Qualifying competition
3	(Australia) Noel Phillips	6	6
(Canada) Harry Fritz	3	2

=== Fourth qualifier ===
First round
4	(Australia) Dale Collings	6	6
(Austria) Robert Reininger	3	3
(Australia) Stephen Myers	6	6
(Australia) Scott Oliver	1	0
(Australia) Denis McKeown	2	3
(Australia) Wayne Pascoe	6	6
(France) Trevor Allan	5	0
(Australia) John Trickey	7	6

Second round
4	(Australia) Dale Collings	2	6	6
(Australia) Stephen Myers	6	3	4
(Australia) Wayne Pascoe	7	4	3
(Australia) John Trickey	5	6	6

Qualifying competition
4	(Australia) Dale Collings	7	1	6
(Australia) John Trickey	6	6	4

=== Fifth qualifier ===
First round
5	(Australia) Warren Maher	6	4	6
(United States) Asher Kahn	3	6	3
(Australia) Alan Caulfield	6	4	6
(Australia) Peter Wise	0	6	1
(Australia) Paul Moody	3	2
(Australia) Simon Clarke	6	6
(Australia) John Bartlett	4	4
(Australia) Chris Chandler	6	6

Second round
5	(Australia) Warren Maher	6	6
(Australia) Alan Caulfield	2	3
(Australia) Simon Clarke	2	5
(Australia) Chris Chandler	6	7

Qualifying competition
5	(Australia) Warren Maher	6	6
(Australia) Chris Chandler	2	0

=== Sixth qualifier ===
First round
6	(United States) Cary Stansbury	6	6
(Australia) Stephen Maloney	0	0
(Australia) Brian Williams	6	6
(Australia) Mark McMahon	2	3
(New Zealand) David Mustard	6	6	3
(United States) Stewart Keller	7	4	6
(Australia) P. Hall	1	2
(Australia) Tim Clements	6	6

Second round
6	(United States) Cary Stansbury	7	6
(Australia) Brian Williams	6	3
(United States) Stewart Keller	2	3
(Australia) Tim Clements	6	6

Qualifying competition
6	(United States) Cary Stansbury	6	6	6
(Australia) Tim Clements	7	3	3

=== Seventh qualifier ===
First round
7	(Finland) Leo Palin	6	7
(Australia) Alan Rae	2	5
(Australia) David Whyte	6	4	6
(Australia) Robert Keighery	4	6	3
(Australia) Andrew Caulfield	w/o
(Australia) Peter Smylie
(Australia) Ian Bersan	3	6
(Australia) Charlie Fancutt	6	7

Second round
7	(Finland) Leo Palin	6	6
(Australia) David Whyte	2	3
(Australia) Peter Smylie	3	0
(Australia) Charlie Fancutt	6	6

Qualifying competition
7	(Finland) Leo Palin	2	6	6
(Australia) Charlie Fancutt	6	2	2

=== Eighth qualifier ===
First round
8	(United States) Jai DiLouie	6	6
(Australia) I. Davies	4	3
(Australia) Tony Stone	7	7
(Australia) Lawrence Hall	5	6
(Australia) Michael Fancutt	6	4	3
(Australia) Warren Girle	3	6	6
(Australia) Barry Phillips-Moore	6	3
(Australia) Wayne Hampson	7	6

Second round
8	(United States) Jai DiLouie	7	5	6
(Australia) Tony Stone	6	7	3
(Australia) Warren Girle	4	7	8
(Australia) Wayne Hampson	6	5	10

Qualifying competition
8	(United States) Jai DiLouie	6	6
(Australia) Wayne Hampson	3	2
