= 1980 Wimbledon Championships – Girls' singles =

Girls' singles
- 1980 Wimbledon Championships

Final
- Champion: (Australia) Debbie Freeman
- Runner-up: (Australia) Susan Leo
- Score: 7–6, 7–5

Events
Singles	men	women		boys	girls
Doubles	men	women	mixed	boys	girls
← 1979 ·	Wimbledon Championships	· 1981 →

Debbie Freeman defeated Susan Leo in the final, 7–6, 7–5 to win the girls' singles tennis title at the 1980 Wimbledon Championships.

== Seeds ==
1. (United States) Susan Mascarin (quarterfinals)
2. (United States) Kathy Horvath (semifinals)
3. (United States) Kelly Henry (second round)
4. (Socialist Federal Republic of Yugoslavia) Renata Šašak (first round)
5. (Australia) Susan Leo (final)
6. (United States) Elise Burgin (first round)
7. (Italy) Patrizia Murgo (second round)
8. (Switzerland) Isabelle Villiger (semifinals)

Click on the seed number of a player to go to their draw section.

== Draw ==
=== Key ===
- Q = Qualifier
- WC = Wild card
- LL = Lucky loser
- Alt = Alternate
- SE = Special exempt
- PR = Protected ranking
- ITF = ITF entry
- JE = Junior exempt
- w/o = Walkover
- r = Retired
- d = Defaulted
- SR = Special ranking

=== Finals ===
Quarterfinals
1	(United States) Susan Mascarin	6	5	4
8	(Switzerland) Isabelle Villiger	3	7	6
(Australia) Debbie Freeman	6	1	6
(Australia) Elizabeth Sayers	2	6	2
5	(Australia) Susan Leo	6	6
(Czechoslovakia) Irena Petru	4	1
(United Kingdom) Kate Brasher	4	6	1
2	(United States) Kathy Horvath	6	4	6

Semifinals
8	(Switzerland) Isabelle Villiger	5	3
(Australia) Debbie Freeman	7	6
5	(Australia) Susan Leo	6	6	6
2	(United States) Kathy Horvath	3	7	3

Final
(Australia) Debbie Freeman	7	7
5	(Australia) Susan Leo	6	5

=== Top half ===
==== Section 1 ====
First round
(Jamaica) Melinda Thatham	1	0
8	(Switzerland) Isabelle Villiger	6	6

Second round
1	(United States) Susan Mascarin	6	6
(Finland) Tarja Koho	0	1
(United Kingdom) Elizabeth Jones	6	6
(Malta) Helen Degiorgio	2	4
(Canada) Karen Dewis	6	4	0
(United States) Kathrin Keil	3	6	6
(Hong Kong) Patricia Hy	2	1
8	(Switzerland) I Villiger	6	6

Third round
1	(United States) S Mascarin	6	6
(United Kingdom) E Jones	3	3
(United States) K Keil	1	1
8	(Switzerland) I Villiger	6	6

Quarterfinals
1	(United States) S Mascarin	6	5	4
8	(Switzerland) I Villiger	3	7	6

==== Section 2 ====
First round
4	(Socialist Federal Republic of Yugoslavia) Renata Šašak	3	6	4
(Australia) Anne Minter	6	3	6
(Republic of Ireland) Caitríona Ruane	1	0
(Australia) Debbie Freeman	6	6
(Australia) Elizabeth Sayers	6	7
6	(United States) Elise Burgin	4	6

Second round
(Australia) A Minter	6	6
(Mexico) Susana Rojas	0	3
(Australia) D Freeman	6	4	6
(United Kingdom) Denise Taylor	2	6	0
(South Africa) Jennifer Mundel	6	6
(United Kingdom) Jackie Reardon	2	0
(France) Corinne Vanier	7	3	5
(Australia) E Sayers	6	6	7

Third round
(Australia) A Minter	2	4
(Australia) D Freeman	6	6
(South Africa) J Mundel	3	0
(Australia) E Sayers	6	6

Quarterfinals
(Australia) D Freeman	6	1	6
(Australia) E Sayers	2	6	2

=== Bottom half ===
==== Section 3 ====
First round
(Czechoslovakia) Irma Nováková	5	1
(Sweden) Catrin Jexell	7	6
(Peru) Pilar Vásquez	2	6	9
(South Africa) Rene Uys	6	4	11
(Belgium) Anne Gabriel	4	2
(Czechoslovakia) Irena Petru	6	6

Second round
5	(Australia) Susan Leo	6	6
(Sweden) C Jexell	4	2
(South Africa) R Uys	4	3
(France) Marie-Christine Calleja	6	6
(Brazil) Niege Dias	4	6
(Switzerland) Lilian Drescher	6	7
(Czechoslovakia) I Petru	7	6
3	(United States) Kelly Henry	5	3

Third round
5	(Australia) S Leo	6	6	8
(France) M-C Calleja	7	2	6
(Switzerland) L Drescher	5	4
(Czechoslovakia) I Petru	7	6

Quarterfinals
5	(Australia) S Leo	6	6
(Czechoslovakia) Irena Petru	4	1

==== Section 4 ====
First round
(Philippines) Pia Tamayo	4	7	7
(Switzerland) Karin Stampfli	6	5	5

Second round
7	(Italy) Patrizia Murgo	7	4	3
(Netherlands) Nanette Schutte	6	6	6
(United Kingdom) Kate Brasher	6	2	6
(Philippines) P Tamayo	1	6	4
(Argentina) Andrea Tiezzi	6	6
(Sweden) Catarina Lindqvist	4	3
(South Africa) Beverly Mould	2	3
2	(United States) Kathleen Horvath	6	6

Third round
(Netherlands) N Schutte	3	6
(United Kingdom) K Brasher	6	7
(Argentina) A Tiezzi	6	1
2	(United States) K Horvath	7	6

Quarterfinals
(United Kingdom) K Brasher	4	6	1
2	(United States) K Horvath	6	4	6
