= Chris Gunning (tennis) =

New Zealand tennis player

- Country (sports): New Zealand
- Born: 7 February 1953 (age 72)

Singles
- Career record: 3–7
- Highest ranking: No. 242 (26 Dec 1979)

Grand Slam singles results
- Australian Open: Q2 (1978, 1979)
- Wimbledon: Q1 (1980)

Doubles
- Career record: 1–5
- Highest ranking: No. 727 (16 Jul 1984)

Chris Gunning (born 7 February 1953) is a New Zealand former professional tennis player.

Gunning, who was a number one junior in New Zealand, played collegiate tennis in the United States. After one season at Southern Illinois University, he transferred to Pepperdine University and won a WCC doubles championship in 1976, partnering João Soares. His brother, Phil Gunning, was one of his teammates at Pepperdine.

On the professional tour, Gunning reached a best singles world ranking of 242 in the world and made the round of 16 at the 1979 New South Wales Open, with wins over Rick Fisher and Dick Crealy. He featured in the qualifying draws for the Australian Open and Wimbledon during his career.
