= Jane Plackett =

British tennis player

- Country (sports): Great Britain
- Born: 28 March 1955 (age 69); Liverpool, England

Singles

Grand Slam singles results
- Australian Open: Q3 (1979)
- Wimbledon: Q2 (1980)

Doubles

Grand Slam doubles results
- Wimbledon: 2R (1980)

Grand Slam mixed doubles results
- Wimbledon: 2R (1979)

Jane Plackett (born 28 March 1955) is a British former professional tennis player.

Plackett, born in Liverpool, was educated at Newcastle's Church High School and is the daughter of Robin Plackett, a professor of statistics at Newcastle University. An under-14s national finalist, Plackett is a product of the Northumberland club in Newcastle and didn't take up full-time tennis until she completed her tertiary studies at London University.

Originally a Northumberland player, Plackett represented Middlesex at county level after moving down to London.

While competing on the professional tour she twice made the second round at Wimbledon in doubles. Her title wins included the Surrey Hard Court Championships and the South Island Open in New Zealand.
