= Stephen Alger =

Bermudian tennis player

- Country (sports): Bermuda
- Born: 28 July 1957; Hamilton, Bermuda
- Turned pro: 1975
- Retired: 1982

Singles
- Career record: 65–38
- Career titles: 3

Grand Slam singles results
- Wimbledon: 3R 1980 Q

Stephen R. Alger (born 28 July 1958) is a Bermudian tennis player who competed for Bermuda at the 1988 Summer Olympics. He is the only tennis player having represented Bermuda at an Olympic event. He was active from 1975 to 1982 and contested 4 career singles finals, winning 3 titles.

== Career ==
He played his first tournament at the Cumberland Hard Court Championships in 1975. He won his first singles title in 1979 at the Coral Beach Invitation against American player King Van Nostrand. At the 1980 Wimbledon Championships he played in the qualifying rounds where he was defeated in the third round by Indian international Ramesh Krishnan.

In 1979 he won the Bermuda Open against the Canadian player Harry Fauquier. He won his final singles title at the Cumberland Hard Court Championships in 1982 against South African player Christo van Rensburg, and played his final singles tournament the same year at the North of England Hard Court Championships. Additionally he was a losing finalist at the East of England Championships in 1976 where he lost to Mark Farrell.

== Career finals ==
=== Singles:4 (3 titles, 1 runners-up) ===
Category + (Titles)
ILTF Independent Circuit (3)

Titles by Surface
Clay – Outdoor (2)
Grass – Outdoor (0)
Hard – Outdoor (1)

Outcome	No.	Date	Tournament	Location	Surface	Opponent	Score
Runner-up	1.	1976	East of England Championships	Felixstowe, England	Grass	(United Kingdom) Mark Farrell	3–6, 4–6
Winner	1.	1979	Coral Beach Invitation	Warwick, Bermuda	Clay	(United States) King Van Nostrand	6–2, 6–1
Winner	2.	1979	Bermuda Open	Paget, Bermuda	Clay	(Canada) Harry Fauquier	6–3, 6–2
Winner	3.	1982	Cumberland Hard Court Championships	London, England	Clay	(South Africa) Christo van Rensburg	6–2, 7–5
