= 1980 Wimbledon Championships – Women's singles =

Women's singles
- 1980 Wimbledon Championships

Final
- Champion: (Australia) Evonne Goolagong Cawley
- Runner-up: (United States) Chris Evert Lloyd
- Score: 6–1, 7–6^{(7–4)}

Details
- Draw: 96 (8Q / 6WC)
- Seeds: 16

Events
Singles	men	women		boys	girls
Doubles	men	women	mixed	boys	girls
- Wimbledon Championships

Evonne Goolagong Cawley defeated Chris Evert Lloyd in the final, 6–1, 7–6^{(7–4)} to win the ladies' singles tennis title at the 1980 Wimbledon Championships. It was her seventh and last major singles title, becoming the first (and still only) mother to win the Wimbledon singles title since World War I. The second-set tiebreak was the first played in the ladies singles final at Wimbledon, and the match was the first singles final (men's or women's) to end on a tiebreak. Goolagong Cawley was the first and only Wimbledon champion (man or woman) to defeat four top-ten seeded players en route to victory, since seeding was expanded to 16 players in 1978. Her path to victory also involved defeating six (of seven) players who themselves were Grand Slam singles finalists or champions in their careers.

Martina Navratilova was the two-time defending champion, but lost to Evert Lloyd in the semifinals in a rematch of the previous two years' finals.

== Seeds ==
1. (United States) Martina Navratilova (semifinals)
2. (United States) Tracy Austin (semifinals)
3. (United States) Chris Evert Lloyd (final)
4. (Australia) Evonne Goolagong Cawley (champion)
5. (United States) Billie Jean King (quarterfinals)
6. (Australia) Wendy Turnbull (quarterfinals)
7. (United Kingdom) Virginia Wade (fourth round)
8. (Australia) Dianne Fromholtz (fourth round)
9. (Czechoslovakia) Hana Mandlíková (fourth round)
10. (United States) Kathy Jordan (fourth round)
11. (South Africa) Greer Stevens (quarterfinals)
12. (Romania) Virginia Ruzici (second round)
13. (United Kingdom) Sue Barker (second round)
14. (United States) Andrea Jaeger (quarterfinals)
15. (Czechoslovakia) Regina Maršíková (second round)
16. (West Germany) Sylvia Hanika (second round)

Click on the seed number of a player to go to their draw section.

== Draw ==
Key

- Q = Qualifier
- WC = Wild card
- LL = Lucky loser
- Alt = Alternate
- ITF = ITF entry
- PR = Protected ranking
- SR = Special ranking
- SE = Special exempt
- JE = Junior exempt
- JR = Junior Accelerator Programme entrant
- CO = College Accelerator Programme entrant
- NG = Next Gen Accelerator Program entrant
- w/o = Walkover
- r = Retired
- d = Defaulted

=== Finals ===
Quarterfinals
1	(United States) Martina Navratilova	7	1	10
5	(United States) Billie Jean King	6	6	8
3	(United States) Chris Evert Lloyd	6	6
14	(United States) Andrea Jaeger	1	1
6	(Australia) Wendy Turnbull	3	2
4	(Australia) Evonne Goolagong Cawley	6	6
11	(South Africa) Greer Stevens	3	3
2	(United States) Tracy Austin	6	6

Semifinals
1	(United States) Martina Navratilova	6	4	2
3	(United States) Chris Evert Lloyd	4	6	6
4	(Australia) Evonne Goolagong Cawley	6	0	6
2	(United States) Tracy Austin	3	6	4

Final
3	(United States) Chris Evert Lloyd	1	6^{4}
4	(Australia) Evonne Goolagong Cawley	6	7^{7}

=== Top half ===
==== Section 1 ====
First round
1	(United States) M Navratilova	6	6
(South Africa) I Kloss	0	3
(South Africa) T Harford	6	6
(South Africa) Y Vermaak	1	4
(United States) M Carillo	2	1
(United States) P Teeguarden	6	6
(United States) K Sands	1	1
10	(United States) K Jordan	6	6

Second round
1	(United States) M Navratilova	6	6
(United States) R Fox	1	1
(United States) R Casals	3	6	6
(South Africa) T Harford	6	4	8
(United States) P Teeguarden	6	7
(Netherlands) M Mesker	0	6
(United States) K McDaniel	3	1
10	(United States) K Jordan	6	6

Third round
1	(United States) M Navratilova	6	3	6
(South Africa) T Harford	3	6	3
(United States) P Teeguarden	4	3
10	(United States) K Jordan	6	6

Fourth round
1	(United States) M Navratilova	6	6
10	(United States) K Jordan	4	2

==== Section 2 ====
First round
(West Germany) H Eisterlehner	4	6	1
(United States) P Shriver	6	3	6
(United States) D Gilbert	6	3	6
WC	(United Kingdom) K Brasher	3	6	8
(United States) A Kiyomura	6	6
(Czechoslovakia) Y Brzáková	3	1
(United States) J DuVall	2	2
(United States) A Smith	6	6

Second round
16	(West Germany) S Hanika	3	6	7
(United States) P Shriver	6	1	9
(United States) B Jordan	6	6
(United Kingdom) K Brasher	4	0
(United States) A Kiyomura	6	3	4
(United States) M Louie	3	6	6
(United States) A Smith	3	6
5	(United States) BJ King	6	7

Third round
(United States) P Shriver	6	6
(United States) B Jordan	4	4
(United States) M Louie	2	2
5	(United States) BJ King	6	6

Fourth round
(United States) P Shriver	7	6	8
5	(United States) BJ King	5	7	10

==== Section 3 ====
First round
(United States) N Yeargin	2	4
(Switzerland) C Jolissaint	6	6
(United States) K Teacher	3	6	6
(Czechoslovakia) R Tomanová	6	3	4
(Czechoslovakia) I Budařová	3	4
(Sweden) N Bohm	6	6
(Italy) S Simmonds	6	4
12	(Romania) V Ruzici	7	6

Second round
3	(United States) C Evert Lloyd	6	6
(Switzerland) C Jolissaint	0	1
(United States) L Morse	6	6
(United States) K Teacher	4	4
(United States) D Morrison	6	2	3
(Sweden) N Bohm	4	6	6
(United States) J Russell	6	3	6
12	(Romania) V Ruzici	2	6	4

Third round
3	(United States) C Evert Lloyd	6	6
(United States) L Morse	1	4
(Sweden) N Bohm	1	6	3
(United States) J Russell	6	3	6

Fourth round
3	(United States) C Evert Lloyd	6	6
(United States) J Russell	3	2

==== Section 4 ====
First round
14	(United States) A Jaeger	6	6
WC	(United Kingdom) A Cooper	3	3
(United States) S Collins	3	2
(United States) D Desfor	6	6
(United States) K Latham	6	6
(United Kingdom) G Coles	4	0
(Argentina) I Madruga	4	4
7	(United Kingdom) V Wade	6	6

Second round
14	(United States) A Jaeger	6	6
(United States) M Redondo	2	3
(United States) J Stratton	7	4	7
(United States) D Desfor	5	6	5
(United States) E Nagelsen	4	6	6
(United States) K Latham	6	1	4
(Sweden) H Anliot	1	3
7	(United Kingdom) V Wade	6	6

Third round
14	(United States) A Jaeger	6	6
(United States) J Stratton	1	1
(United States) E Nagelsen	7	5	3
7	(United Kingdom) V Wade	6	7	6

Fourth round
14	(United States) A Jaeger	6	7
7	(United Kingdom) V Wade	2	6

=== Bottom half ===
==== Section 5 ====
First round
(Sweden) E Ekblom	6	6	6
(United States) L Allen	3	7	3
(United States) M-L Piatek	2	6	1
WC	(United Kingdom) D Jevans	6	4	6
(Australia) A Tobin-Evans	3	4
Q	(United States) L Forood	6	6
WC	(United Kingdom) L Geeves	6	3	3
(United States) BA Dent	3	6	6

Second round
6	(Australia) W Turnbull	6	6
(Sweden) E Ekblom	1	4
(United States) S Acker	6	3	6
WC	(United Kingdom) D Jevans	1	6	2
(South Korea) D-h Lee	4	1
Q	(United States) L Forood	6	6
(United States) BA Dent	3	7	6
13	(United Kingdom) S Barker	6	5	2

Third round
6	(Australia) W Turnbull	6	6
(United States) S Acker	3	2
Q	(United States) L Forood	6	2	6
(United States) BA Dent	2	6	3

Fourth round
6	(Australia) W Turnbull	6	6
Q	(United States) L Forood	0	2

==== Section 6 ====
First round
(United States) W White	6	6
Q	(Australia) P Whytcross	2	3
(South Africa) R Fairbank	6	6
(United States) T Lewis	4	4
(Netherlands) B Stöve	7	6
Q	(United States) L Antonoplis	6	2
(United States) S Walsh	1	2
4	(Australia) E Goolagong Cawley	6	6

Second round
9	(Czechoslovakia) H Mandlíková	6	6	6
(United States) W White	4	7	4
Q	(United States) A Buchanan	1	2
(South Africa) R Fairbank	6	6
(United Kingdom) A Hobbs	0	4
(Netherlands) B Stöve	6	6
Q	(Australia) J Walker	2	2
4	(Australia) E Goolagong Cawley	6	6

Third round
9	(Czechoslovakia) H Mandlíková	6	6
(South Africa) R Fairbank	2	4
(Netherlands) B Stöve	6	2	3
4	(Australia) E Goolagong Cawley	3	6	6

Fourth round
9	(Czechoslovakia) H Mandlíková	7	3	1
4	(Australia) E Goolagong Cawley	6	6	6

==== Section 7 ====
First round
8	(Australia) D Fromholtz	7	6
(United States) R McCallum	5	3
WC	(United Kingdom) L Charles	6	5	6
(United States) J Harrington	3	7	1
(United Kingdom) J Durie	4	6	4
(West Germany) B Bunge	6	4	6
(United States) P Smith	1	4
11	(South Africa) G Stevens	6	6

Second round
8	(Australia) D Fromholtz	6	6
(France) B Simon	2	0
WC	(United Kingdom) L Charles	6	6	3
(United States) S Margolin	2	7	6
(United States) B Norton	4	0
(West Germany) B Bunge	6	6
Q	(Canada) M Blackwood	3	1
11	(South Africa) G Stevens	6	6

Third round
8	(Australia) D Fromholtz	6	6
(United States) S Margolin	4	2
(West Germany) B Bunge	4	3
11	(South Africa) G Stevens	6	6

Fourth round
8	(Australia) D Fromholtz	2	2
11	(South Africa) G Stevens	6	6

==== Section 8 ====
First round
(Romania) F Mihai	7	1	1
Q	(Australia) S Saliba	6	6	6
WC	(South Africa) S Rollinson	2	2
(United States) T Holladay	6	6
(United States) R Gerulaitis	3	6
(United States) R Blount	6	7
(United States) A Moulton	1	2
2	(United States) T Austin	6	6

Second round
15	(Czechoslovakia) R Maršíková	2	6	1
Q	(Australia) S Saliba	6	3	6
(United States) T Holladay	6	6
(United States) S Mascarin	1	0
(United States) R Blount	6	5
(United States) B Potter	7	7
Q	(Australia) N Gregory	1	2
2	(United States) T Austin	6	6

Third round
Q	(Australia) S Saliba	3	4
(United States) T Holladay	6	6
(United States) B Potter	2	7	2
2	(United States) T Austin	6	6	6

Fourth round
(United States) T Holladay	2	3
2	(United States) T Austin	6	6

== See also ==
- Evert–Navratilova rivalry

Preceded by 1980 French Open – Women's singles	Grand Slam women's singles	Succeeded by 1980 US Open – Women's singles
