= 1979 ABN World Tennis Tournament – Singles =

Singles
- 1979 ABN World Tennis Tournament

Final
- Champion: (Sweden) Björn Borg
- Runner-up: (United States) John McEnroe
- Score: 6–4, 6–2

Details
- Draw: 32
- Seeds: 8

Events
Singles	Doubles
- ABN World Tennis Tournament

Jimmy Connors was the defending champion of the singles event at the ABN World Tennis Tournament, but did not participate in this edition. First-seeded Björn Borg won the title after a victory in the final against third-seeded John McEnroe 6–4, 6–2.

== Seeds ==
1. (Sweden) Björn Borg (champion)
2. (United States) Vitas Gerulaitis (quarterfinals)
3. (United States) John McEnroe (final)
4. (Mexico) Raúl Ramírez (quarterfinals)
5. (Romania) Ilie Năstase (first round)
6. (Argentina) José Luis Clerc (second round)
7. (Poland) Wojtek Fibak (quarterfinals)
8. (United Kingdom) Buster Mottram (second round)

== Draw ==
=== Finals ===
Semifinals
1	(Sweden) Björn Borg	6	6
(United States) Peter Fleming	1	4
3	(United States) John McEnroe	6	6
(India) Vijay Amritraj	0	3

Final
1	(Sweden) Björn Borg	6	6
3	(United States) John McEnroe	4	2

=== Upper half ===
First round
1	(Sweden) Björn Borg	6	6
(United Kingdom) Mark Cox	4	2
(South Africa) David Schneider	6	3	3
(Netherlands) Louk Sanders	1	6	6
(United States) Johan Kriek	7	6
Q	(Australia) Dick Crealy	6	2
(Austria) Robert Reininger	6	3
6	(Argentina) José Luis Clerc	7	6
4	(Mexico) Raúl Ramírez	6	6	7
Q	(United Kingdom) John Feaver	4	7	5
(South Africa) Bernard Mitton	6	7	6
(Australia) Paul Kronk	7	6	7
(India) Anand Amritraj	3	6
(United States) Peter Fleming	6	7
(United States) Pat Dupre	1	6	3
8	(United Kingdom) Buster Mottram	6	3	6

Second round
1	(Sweden) Björn Borg	6	6
(Netherlands) Louk Sanders	3	2
(United States) Johan Kriek	6	6
6	(Argentina) José Luis Clerc	4	2
4	(Mexico) Raúl Ramírez	6	7
(Australia) Paul Kronk	2	5
(United States) Peter Fleming	6	6
8	(United Kingdom) Buster Mottram	3	4

Quarterfinals
1	(Sweden) Björn Borg	6	6
(United States) Johan Kriek	4	2
4	(Mexico) Raúl Ramírez	5	3
(United States) Peter Fleming	7	6

Semifinals
1	(Sweden) Björn Borg	6	6
(United States) Peter Fleming	2	2

=== Lower half ===
First round
7	(Poland) Wojtek Fibak	6	6
(West Germany) Ulrich Pinner	1	2
(South Africa) Deon Joubert	6	1	1
(Socialist Federal Republic of Yugoslavia) Željko Franulović	2	6	6
(Netherlands) Tom Okker	3	5
(United States) Gene Mayer	6	7
(Switzerland) Heinz Günthardt	2	1
3	(United States) John McEnroe	6	6
5	(Romania) Ilie Năstase	6	7	4
(West Germany) Rolf Gehring	7	5	6
(United States) Andrew Pattison	5	2
(India) Vijay Amritraj	7	6
(United States) Brian Teacher	2	4
(Australia) Geoff Masters	6	6
(Austria) Peter Feigl	1	4
2	(United States) Vitas Gerulaitis	6	6

Second round
7	(Poland) Wojtek Fibak	6	6
(Socialist Federal Republic of Yugoslavia) Željko Franulović	4	2
(United States) Gene Mayer	4	1
3	(United States) John McEnroe	6	6
(West Germany) Rolf Gehring	6	3
(India) Vijay Amritraj	7	6
(Australia) Geoff Masters	7	4	2
2	(United States) Vitas Gerulaitis	6	6	6

Quarterfinals
7	(Poland) Wojtek Fibak	3	1
3	(United States) John McEnroe	6	6
(India) Vijay Amritraj	6	7
2	(United States) Vitas Gerulaitis	1	6

Semifinals
3	(United States) John McEnroe	6	6
(India) Vijay Amritraj	0	3
