= 1980 Wimbledon Championships – Men's singles =

Men's singles
- 1980 Wimbledon Championships

Final
- Champion: (Sweden) Björn Borg
- Runner-up: (United States) John McEnroe
- Score: 1–6, 7–5, 6–3, 6–7^{(16–18)}, 8–6

Details
- Draw: 128 (16Q / 8WC)
- Seeds: 16

Events
Singles	men	women		boys	girls
Doubles	men	women	mixed	boys	girls
- Wimbledon Championships

Four-time defending champion Björn Borg defeated John McEnroe in the final, 1–6, 7–5, 6–3, 6–7^{(16–18)}, 8–6 to win the gentlemen's singles tennis title at the 1980 Wimbledon Championships. It was his fifth consecutive Wimbledon title and tenth major title overall. The final has often been called one of the greatest and most exciting matches of all time, and was the core of the Borg–McEnroe rivalry. A dramatic depiction of the final featured as the central event of the 2017 movie Borg vs McEnroe.

== Seeds ==
1. (Sweden) Björn Borg (champion)
2. (United States) John McEnroe (final)
3. (United States) Jimmy Connors (semifinals)
4. (United States) Vitas Gerulaitis (fourth round)
5. (United States) Roscoe Tanner (quarterfinals)
6. (United States) Gene Mayer (quarterfinals)
7. (United States) Peter Fleming (quarterfinals)
8. (Paraguay) Víctor Pecci (third round)

9. (United States) Pat DuPré (third round)
10. (Czechoslovakia) Ivan Lendl (third round)
11. (United States) Harold Solomon (withdrew before the tournament began)
12. (France) Yannick Noah (withdrew before the tournament began)
13. (Poland) Wojciech Fibak (quarterfinals)
14. (United States) Victor Amaya (first round)
15. (United States) Stan Smith (third round)
16. (Argentina) José Luis Clerc (third round)

Click on the seed number of a player to go to their draw section. Harold Solomon and Yannick Noah withdrew due to injury. They were replaced in the draw by Qualifiers Kevin Curren and Wayne Hampson respectively.

== Draw ==
Key

- Q = Qualifier
- WC = Wild card
- LL = Lucky loser
- Alt = Alternate
- ITF = ITF entry
- PR = Protected ranking
- SR = Special ranking
- SE = Special exempt
- JE = Junior exempt
- JR = Junior Accelerator Programme entrant
- CO = College Accelerator Programme entrant
- NG = Next Gen Accelerator Program entrant
- w/o = Walkover
- r = Retired
- d = Defaulted

=== Finals ===
Quarterfinals
1	(Sweden) Björn Borg	7	6	7
6	(United States) Gene Mayer	5	3	5
13	(Poland) Wojciech Fibak	4	6	2
(United States) Brian Gottfried	6	7	6
5	(United States) Roscoe Tanner	6	2	6	2	2
3	(United States) Jimmy Connors	1	6	4	6	6
7	(United States) Peter Fleming	3	2	2
2	(United States) John McEnroe	6	6	6

Semifinals
1	(Sweden) Björn Borg	6	4	6	6
(United States) Brian Gottfried	2	6	2	0
3	(United States) Jimmy Connors	3	6	3	4
2	(United States) John McEnroe	6	3	6	6

Final
1	(Sweden) Björn Borg	1	7	6	6^{16}	8
2	(United States) John McEnroe	6	5	3	7^{18}	6

=== Top half ===
==== Section 1 ====
First round
1	(Sweden) Björn Borg	6	6	6
Q	(Egypt) Ismail El Shafei	3	4	4
(Israel) Shlomo Glickstein	4	6	3	7	8
(Mexico) Raúl Ramírez	6	2	6	5	6
(Sweden) Per Hjertquist	2	1	2
(Australia) Rod Frawley	6	6	6
(United States) Howard Schoenfield	2	4	1
(United States) Tony Graham	6	6	6
Q	(India) Ramesh Krishnan	3	6	6	6
(United States) Bill Scanlon	6	4	4	4
(United Kingdom) Mark Cox	3	6	6	6
(France) Gilles Moretton	6	1	4	4
(Hungary) Balázs Taróczy	6	3	6	6
(United States) Chris Delaney	3	6	4	2
(United States) Trey Waltke	3	6	6	6
Q	(Australia) Wayne Hampson	6	4	4	2

Second round
1	(Sweden) B Borg	6	6	7
(Israel) S Glickstein	3	1	5
(Australia) R Frawley	6	2	6	6	13
(United States) T Graham	7	6	1	2	11
Q	(India) R Krishnan	6	7	7	6
(United Kingdom) M Cox	7	5	5	1
(Hungary) B Taróczy	6	6	6
(United States) T Waltke	3	2	2

Third round
1	(Sweden) B Borg	6	6^{8}	6	7
(Australia) R Frawley	4	7^{10}	1	5
Q	(India) R Krishnan	3	6	2
(Hungary) B Taróczy	6	7	6

Fourth round
1	(Sweden) B Borg	6	7	6
(Hungary) B Taróczy	1	5	2

==== Section 2 ====
First round
10	(Czechoslovakia) Ivan Lendl	6	4	6	6
(United States) Marty Riessen	3	6	2	4
(United States) John Sadri	6	6	6
(United States) Billy Martin	4	2	4
(Australia) Colin Dibley	6	6	7
(United States) Tom Leonard	1	2	6
(Australia) Geoff Masters	2	6	6	6
(South Africa) Ray Moore	6	2	0	2
Q	(United States) Scott Davis	7	4	2	3
(Italy) Corrado Barazzutti	5	6	6	6
(United States) Erik van Dillen	6	6	6	5	7
(Italy) Adriano Panatta	3	2	7	7	9
(United States) Chris Mayotte	5	3	7	4
WC	(United Kingdom) Andrew Jarrett	7	6	6	6
Q	(Australia) Chris Johnstone	3	6	1	2
6	(United States) Gene Mayer	6	4	6	6

Second round
10	(Czechoslovakia) I Lendl	6	6	6
(United States) J Sadri	3	4	3
(Australia) C Dibley	2	6	7	6	8
(Australia) G Masters	6	2	6	7	6
(Italy) C Barazzutti	6	3	4	6	1
(Italy) A Panatta	1	6	6	3	6
WC	(United Kingdom) A Jarrett	4	4	1
6	(United States) E Mayer	6	6	6

Third round
10	(Czechoslovakia) I Lendl	6	3	4	6
(Australia) C Dibley	4	6	6	7
(Italy) A Panatta	3	3	2
6	(United States) E Mayer	6	6	6

Fourth round
(Australia) C Dibley	6	5	6	1	2
6	(United States) E Mayer	3	7	4	6	6

==== Section 3 ====
First round
4	(United States) Vitas Gerulaitis	6	6	6
(Sweden) Stefan Simonsson	0	4	2
WC	(United Kingdom) Robin Drysdale	7	6	0	4	4
LL	(India) Sashi Menon	6	4	6	6	6
(Paraguay) Francisco González	6	4	3
(Australia) Ross Case	7	6	6
(United States) Bruce Manson	7	6	7	6
(United States) Tom Gullikson	6	7	6	4
LL	(United States) John Austin	6	6	7
(Ecuador) A Gómez	2	1	6
(United States) Fritz Buehning	3	6	2
(South Africa) Johan Kriek	6	7	6
(France) Dominique Bedel	7	4	4	6
(New Zealand) Russell Simpson	6	6	6	7
(Australia) Mark Edmondson	7	4	6	6	8
13	(Poland) Wojciech Fibak	5	6	3	7	10

Second round
4	(United States) V Gerulaitis	6	6	7	6
LL	(India) S Menon	7	4	5	2
(Australia) R Case	6	6	5
(United States) B Manson	7	7	7
LL	(United States) J Austin	4	3	1
(South Africa) J Kriek	6	6	6
(New Zealand) R Simpson	6	2	3	2
13	(Poland) W Fibak	3	6	6	6

Third round
4	(United States) V Gerulaitis	6	4	7	6
(United States) B Manson	4	6	5	4
(South Africa) J Kriek	1	4	1
13	(Poland) W Fibak	6	6	6

Fourth round
4	(United States) V Gerulaitis	6	6	3	3	6
13	(Poland) W Fibak	3	4	6	6	8

==== Section 4 ====
First round
15	(United States) Stan Smith	5	6	6	6
(Zimbabwe) Andrew Pattison	7	3	3	4
LL	(Australia) Syd Ball	4	6	3	6	3
(Austria) Peter Feigl	6	1	6	3	6
Q	(Australia) Chris Kachel	5	3	1
(United States) Brian Gottfried	7	6	6
(New Zealand) Chris Lewis	6	3	7	5	6
LL	(Finland) Leo Palin	4	6	5	7	4
(Australia) Phil Dent	4	7	3	6	6
(South Africa) Robert Trogolo	6	6	6	3	4
WC	(United Kingdom) Jonathan Smith	2	3	6	3
(South Africa) Bernard Mitton	6	6	3	6
(United States) Tony Giammalva	6	7	3	3
(Czechoslovakia) Jan Kodeš	7	5	6	6
(United States) Matt Mitchell	5	1	6
8	(Paraguay) Víctor Pecci	7	6	7

Second round
15	(United States) S Smith	4	6	7	6
(Austria) P Feigl	6	1	6	1
(United States) B Gottfried	6	6	6
(New Zealand) C Lewis	3	4	2
(Australia) P Dent	7	6	6
(South Africa) B Mitton	5	3	3
(Czechoslovakia) J Kodeš	3	4	4
8	(Paraguay) V Pecci	6	6	6

Third round
15	(United States) S Smith	2	3	2
(United States) B Gottfried	6	6	6
(Australia) P Dent	3	6	6	6
8	(Paraguay) V Pecci	6	2	3	1

Fourth round
(United States) B Gottfried	6	6	6
(Australia) P Dent	1	2	2

=== Bottom half ===
==== Section 5 ====
First round
5	(United States) Roscoe Tanner	6	6	6
(Czechoslovakia) Jiří Hřebec	2	0	4
(Brazil) Thomaz Koch	6	7	2	3
Q	(Australia) John Fitzgerald	7	6	6	6
Q	(Australia) Peter Doohan	2	6	3
(Australia) Paul McNamee	6	7	6
(United States) Robert Van't Hof	7	2	7	6
(United States) Ferdi Taygan	6	6	5	4
WC	(United Kingdom) John Lloyd	4	2	2
(United Kingdom) Buster Mottram	6	6	6
Q	(South Africa) Eddie Edwards	4	4	2
(United States) Nick Saviano	6	6	6
WC	(South Africa) Cliff Drysdale	6	3	3	7	6
(South Africa) Byron Bertram	2	6	6	6	4
(United States) Vincent Van Patten	4	6	1	4
9	(United States) Pat DuPré	6	3	6	6

Second round
5	(United States) R Tanner	6	3	6	7
Q	(Australia) J Fitzgerald	1	6	3	6
(Australia) P McNamee	6	6	6
(United States) R Van't Hof	1	1	3
(United Kingdom) C Mottram	7	6	3	6	11
(United States) N Saviano	6	7	6	4	13
WC	(South Africa) C Drysdale	2	3	0
9	(United States) P DuPré	6	6	6

Third round
5	(United States) R Tanner	7	6	6
(Australia) P McNamee	6	4	4
(United States) N Saviano	7	1	4	7	11
9	(United States) P DuPré	6	6	6	5	9

Fourth round
5	(United States) R Tanner	7	3	6	6
(United States) N Saviano	6	6	3	4

==== Section 6 ====
First round
14	(United States) Victor Amaya	6	4	0	6	3
(United States) Hank Pfister	3	6	6	3	6
Q	(United States) George Hardie	6	7	1	5
(United States) Bob Lutz	7	6	6	7
(United States) Tim Gullikson	7	6	6
(Chile) Belus Prajoux	5	3	1
(Belgium) Bernard Boileau	6	1	3	3
(Australia) Kim Warwick	4	6	6	6
Q	(South Africa) John Yuill	5	3	6
(Switzerland) Heinz Günthardt	7	6	7
(Australia) Peter McNamara	6	1	3	2
(Australia) Warren Maher	2	6	6	6
(United States) Sherwood Stewart	7	6	6	6
(United States) Peter Rennert	6	7	4	3
WC	(United Kingdom) Richard Lewis	0	3	1
3	(United States) Jimmy Connors	6	6	6

Second round
(United States) H Pfister	6	6	6
(United States) R Lutz	2	3	1
(United States) Ti Gullikson	3	6	6	7
(Australia) K Warwick	6	3	2	6
(Switzerland) H Günthardt	7	6	6
(Australia) W Maher	5	4	2
(United States) S Stewart	0	2	1
3	(United States) J Connors	6	6	6

Third round
(United States) H Pfister	4	6	7	1	6
(United States) Ti Gullikson	6	3	5	6	2
(Switzerland) H Günthardt	7	2	1	4
3	(United States) J Connors	6	6	6	6

Fourth round
(United States) H Pfister	4	7	1	6
3	(United States) J Connors	6	6	6	7

==== Section 7 ====
First round
7	(United States) Peter Fleming	7	6	6
(Switzerland) Colin Dowdeswell	5	3	4
(United States) Tom Gorman	4	5	4
(Czechoslovakia) Stanislav Birner	6	7	6
WC	(United Kingdom) John Feaver	2	3	6
(Romania) Ilie Năstase	6	6	7
(United States) Sandy Mayer	6	6	6	3	2
(United States) Dick Stockton	7	3	4	6	6
(France) Pascal Portes	6	6	3	6	9
LL	(United States) Van Winitsky	4	4	6	7	7
Q	(New Zealand) Onny Parun	6	5	6	6
(Argentina) Carlos Gattiker	1	7	1	1
Q	(United Kingdom) John Paish	4	6	6
(France) Bernard Fritz	6	7	7
(India) Vijay Amritraj	6	6	5	5	4
16	(Argentina) José Luis Clerc	1	3	7	7	6

Second round
7	(United States) P Fleming	4	6	6	6
(Czechoslovakia) S Birner	6	3	4	2
(Romania) I Năstase	4	6	5	6	6
(United States) R Stockton	6	2	7	2	2
(France) P Portes	5	3	4
Q	(New Zealand) O Parun	7	6	6
(France) B Fritz	4	6	6	0
16	(Argentina) JL Clerc	6	7	3	6

Third round
7	(United States) P Fleming	6	3	7	7
(Romania) I Năstase	4	6	6	6
Q	(New Zealand) O Parun	3	7	6	6
16	(Argentina) JL Clerc	6	6	4	3

Fourth round
7	(United States) P Fleming	6	6	6	7
Q	(New Zealand) O Parun	3	2	7	6

==== Section 8 ====
First round
Q	(South Africa) Kevin Curren	6	6	6	6
Q	(United States) Matt Doyle	4	3	7	2
LL	(South Africa) David Schneider	6	3	3	7	3
(Australia) Brad Drewett	4	6	6	6	6
(Spain) Miguel Mir	2	3	0
(United States) Steve Krulevitz	6	6	6
(United States) Tim Wilkison	4	6	5
(United States) Brian Teacher	6	7	7
(Netherlands) Tom Okker	6	7	6
(Australia) John James	3	6	3
Q	(Republic of Ireland) Sean Sorensen	2	6	1
(France) Patrice Dominguez	6	7	6
WC	(United Kingdom) Roger Taylor	1	6	6	4	3
(Australia) Terry Rocavert	6	3	2	6	6
(United States) Butch Walts	3	3	0
2	(United States) John McEnroe	6	6	6

Second round
Q	(South Africa) K Curren	7	6	6	6
(Australia) B Drewett	6	7	4	4
(United States) S Krulevitz	6	2	1	1
(United States) B Teacher	4	6	6	6
(Netherlands) T Okker	7	7	1	2	6
(France) P Dominguez	6	6	6	6	3
(Australia) T Rocavert	6	5	7	6	3
2	(United States) J McEnroe	4	7	6	7	6

Third round
Q	(South Africa) K Curren	5	6	6	6
(United States) B Teacher	7	2	3	1
(Netherlands) T Okker	0	6	1
2	(United States) J McEnroe	6	7	6

Fourth round
Q	(South Africa) K Curren	5	6	6
2	(United States) J McEnroe	7	7	7

Preceded by 1980 French Open	Grand Slams; Men's Singles	Succeeded by 1980 US Open
