= 1980 Wimbledon Championships – Women's doubles =

Women's doubles
- 1980 Wimbledon Championships

Final
- Champions: (United States) Kathy Jordan (United States) Anne Smith
- Runners-up: (United States) Rosie Casals (Australia) Wendy Turnbull
- Score: 4–6, 7–5, 6–1

Details
- Draw: 48 (4 Q )
- Seeds: 8

Events
Singles	men	women		boys	girls
Doubles	men	women	mixed	boys	girls
← 1979 ·	Wimbledon Championships	· 1981 →

Billie Jean King and Martina Navratilova were the defending champions but lost in the semifinals to Kathy Jordan and Anne Smith.

Jordan and Smith defeated Rosie Casals and Wendy Turnbull in the final, 4–6, 7–5, 6–1 to win the ladies' doubles tennis title at the 1980 Wimbledon Championships.

== Seeds ==
1. (United States) Billie Jean King / (United States) Martina Navratilova (semifinals)
2. (United States) Rosie Casals / (Australia) Wendy Turnbull (final)
3. (United States) Pam Shriver / (Netherlands) Betty Stöve (quarterfinals)
4. (United States) Kathy Jordan / (United States) Anne Smith (champions)
5. (South Africa) Greer Stevens / (United Kingdom) Virginia Wade (quarterfinals)
6. (United States) Chris Evert Lloyd / (Romania) Virginia Ruzici (quarterfinals)
7. (United Kingdom) Sue Barker / (United States) Ann Kiyomura (quarterfinals)
8. (Czechoslovakia) Hana Mandlíková / (Czechoslovakia) Renáta Tomanová (second round)

Click on the seed number of a player to go to their draw section.

== Draw ==
=== Key ===
- Q = Qualifier
- WC = Wild card
- LL = Lucky loser
- Alt = Alternate
- SE = Special exempt
- PR = Protected ranking
- ITF = ITF entry
- JE = Junior exempt
- w/o = Walkover
- r = Retired
- d = Defaulted
- SR = Special ranking

=== Finals ===
Quarterfinals
1	(United States) Billie Jean King (United States) Martina Navratilova	6	6
6	(United States) Chris Evert Lloyd (Romania) Virginia Ruzici	2	2
4	(United States) Kathy Jordan (United States) Anne Smith	3	6	6
7	(United Kingdom) Sue Barker (United States) Ann Kiyomura	6	2	1
(United States) Candy Reynolds (United States) Paula Smith	6	3	7
3	(United States) Pam Shriver (Netherlands) Betty Stöve	3	6	5
5	(South Africa) Greer Stevens (United Kingdom) Virginia Wade	6	4
2	(United States) Rosie Casals (Australia) Wendy Turnbull	7	6

Semifinals
1	(United States) Billie Jean King (United States) Martina Navratilova	2	6	4
4	(United States) Kathy Jordan (United States) Anne Smith	6	4	6
(United States) Candy Reynolds (United States) Paula Smith	7	6	0
2	(United States) Rosemary Casals (Australia) Wendy Turnbull	6	7	6

Final
4	(United States) Kathy Jordan (United States) Anne Smith	4	7	6
2	(United States) Rosemary Casals (Australia) Wendy Turnbull	6	5	1

=== Top half ===
==== Section 1 ====
First round
(United States) K Horvath (United States) M-L Piatek	7	5	4
(United States) M Carillo (United States) R McCallum	5	7	6
(United Kingdom) C Drury (United Kingdom) J Plackett	7	3	7
(Czechoslovakia) Y Brzáková (Czechoslovakia) I Budařová	6	6	5
(United States) K McDaniel (United States) B Potter	6	6	4
(Czechoslovakia) R Maršíková (Romania) F Mihai	7	1	6
(United States) BA Dent (South Africa) I Kloss	1	1
6	(United States) C Evert Lloyd (Romania) V Ruzici	6	6

Second round
1	(United States) BJ King (United States) M Navratilova	7	6
(United States) M Carillo (United States) R McCallum	5	4
(United States) M Guerrant (United States) K Latham	6	6
(United Kingdom) C Drury (United Kingdom) J Plackett	1	3
(West Germany) B Bunge (United States) P Teeguarden	6	6
(Czechoslovakia) R Maršíková (Romania) F Mihai	1	2
(United Kingdom) L Charles (South Africa) T Harford	6	4	3
6	(United States) C Evert Lloyd (Romania) V Ruzici	3	6	6

Third round
1	(United States) BJ King (United States) M Navratilova	1
(United States) M Guerrant (United States) K Latham	0^{r}
(West Germany) B Bunge (United States) P Teeguarden	4	1
6	(United States) C Evert Lloyd (Romania) V Ruzici	6	6

Quarterfinals
1	(United States) BJ King (United States) M Navratilova	6	6
6	(United States) C Evert Lloyd (Romania) V Ruzici	2	2

==== Section 2 ====
First round
Q	(Brazil) P Medrado (Brazil) C Monteiro	2	6
(Australia) C Doerner (Sweden) E Ekblom	6	7
(South Africa) R Fairbank (United States) D Gilbert	4	2
(Australia) L Harrison (Netherlands) M Mesker	6	6
(New Zealand) C Newton (Australia) J Walker	6	6
(Argentina) I Madruga (Argentina) A Villagrán	4	3
(United Kingdom) J Durie (United Kingdom) D Jevans	4	6	7
7	(United Kingdom) S Barker (United States) A Kiyomura	6	2	9

Second round
4	(United States) K Jordan (United States) A Smith	6	6
(Australia) C Doerner (Sweden) E Ekblom	1	2
(United States) S Acker (United States) J Russell	6	6
(Australia) L Harrison (Netherlands) M Mesker	3	2
(New Zealand) C Newton (Australia) J Walker	6	6
(United States) A Henricksson (United States) F Hutnick	2	3
Q	(United States) L Antonoplis (Australia) D Evers	2	0
7	(United Kingdom) S Barker (United States) A Kiyomura	6	6

Third round
4	(United States) K Jordan (United States) A Smith	2	6	6
(United States) S Acker (United States) J Russell	6	2	4
(New Zealand) C Newton (Australia) J Walker	5	6
7	(United Kingdom) S Barker (United States) A Kiyomura	7	7

Quarterfinals
4	(United States) K Jordan (United States) A Smith	3	6	6
7	(United Kingdom) S Barker (United States) A Kiyomura	6	2	1

=== Bottom half ===
==== Section 3 ====
First round
(United States) L Forood (United States) B Jordan	3	2
(United States) C Reynolds (United States) P Smith	6	6
(United States) A Buchanan (United States) K Sands	6	6
Q	(Japan) N Sato (Chile) S Urroz	0	2
(United States) R Blount (United States) M Redondo	3	6	1
(United States) P Johnson (United States) S Margolin	6	3	6
(Switzerland) P Delhees (Switzerland) C Jolissaint	2	2
3	(United States) P Shriver (Netherlands) B Stöve	6	6

Second round
8	(Czechoslovakia) H Mandlíková (Czechoslovakia) R Tomanová	4	5
(United States) C Reynolds (United States) P Smith	6	7
(United States) A Buchanan (United States) K Sands	6	6
(West Germany) H Eisterlehner (Italy) S Simmonds	3	4
(United States) P Johnson (United States) S Margolin	3	1
(United States) K Jones (United States) L Morse	6	6
LL	(South Africa) B Mould (South Africa) R Uys	2	0
3	(United States) P Shriver (Netherlands) B Stöve	6	6

Third round
(United States) C Reynolds (United States) P Smith	6	6
(United States) A Buchanan (United States) K Sands	3	4
(United States) K Jones (United States) L Morse	0	3
3	(United States) P Shriver (Netherlands) B Stöve	6	6

Quarterfinals
(United States) C Reynolds (United States) P Smith	6	3	7
3	(United States) P Shriver (Netherlands) B Stöve	3	6	5

==== Section 4 ====
First round
(Australia) D Fromholtz (United States) T Holladay	6	6
(Sweden) H Anliot (Sweden) N Bohm	4	1
(United States) R Fox (United States) K Teacher	4	3
(Canada) M Blackwood (Australia) P Whytcross	6	6
(United Kingdom) G Coles (United Kingdom) A Hobbs	7	6	3
(United States) J DuVall (South Africa) Y Vermaak	5	7	6
(United States) L Allen (United States) D Morrison	6	2	3
2	(United States) R Casals (Australia) W Turnbull	2	6	6

Second round
5	(South Africa) G Stevens (United Kingdom) V Wade	6	6
(Australia) D Fromholtz (United States) T Holladay	4	4
(United States) D Desfor (United States) S Walsh	6	6
(Canada) M Blackwood (Australia) P Whytcross	7	7
Q	(Australia) D Freeman (Australia) S Saliba	7	7
(United States) J DuVall (South Africa) Y Vermaak	6	6
(United States) A Jaeger (United States) E Nagelsen	3	2
2	(United States) R Casals (Australia) W Turnbull	6	6

Third round
5	(South Africa) G Stevens (United Kingdom) V Wade	6	6
(Canada) M Blackwood (Australia) P Whytcross	3	2
Q	(Australia) D Freeman (Australia) S Saliba	2	3
2	(United States) R Casals (Australia) W Turnbull	6	6

Quarterfinals
5	(South Africa) G Stevens (United Kingdom) V Wade	6	4
2	(United States) R Casals (Australia) W Turnbull	7	6
