= Kate Brasher (tennis) =

English tennis player

- Country (sports): Great Britain
- Born: 2 August 1962 (age 63)
- Prize money: US$ 19,692

Singles

Grand Slam singles results
- French Open: 1R (1983)
- Wimbledon: 2R (1980)
- US Open: 1R (1981, 1982)

Kate Brasher (born 2 August 1962) is a retired tennis player from the UK who competed on the WTA Tour.

Brasher is the daughter of Shirley Bloomer, who won the ladies singles title at the 1957 French Open, and Olympic athlete Chris Brasher. She was a British Junior champion and played for Britain in the Junior Wightman Cup. She retired from the full-time game in order to attend London University.
