= 1980 Wimbledon Championships – Boys' singles =

Boys' singles
- 1980 Wimbledon Championships

Final
- Champion: (France) Thierry Tulasne
- Runner-up: (West Germany) Hans-Dieter Beutel
- Score: 6–4, 3–6, 6–4

Events
| Singles | men | women | | boys | girls |
| Doubles | men | women | mixed | boys | girls |
| ← 1979 · | Wimbledon Championships | · 1981 → |

Thierry Tulasne defeated Hans-Dieter Beutel in the final, 6–4, 3–6, 6–4 to win the boys' singles tennis title at the 1980 Wimbledon Championships.

== Seeds ==
1. (United States) Scott Davis (semifinals)
2. (United States) Ben Testerman (semifinals)
3. (France) Thierry Tulasne (champion)
4. (France) Henri Leconte (first round)
5. (United States) Sammy Giammalva (quarterfinals)
6. (Sweden) Stefan Svensson (third round)
7. (Sweden) Jan Gunnarsson (semifinals)
8. (Netherlands) Eric Wilborts (first round)

Click on the seed number of a player to go to their draw section.

== Draw ==
=== Key ===
- Q = Qualifier
- WC = Wild card
- LL = Lucky loser
- Alt = Alternate
- SE = Special exempt
- PR = Protected ranking
- ITF = ITF entry
- JE = Junior exempt
- w/o = Walkover
- r = Retired
- d = Defaulted
- SR = Special ranking

=== Finals ===
Quarterfinals
1 | (United States) Scott Davis | 6 | 6
(Socialist Federal Republic of Yugoslavia) Slobodan Živojinović | 2 | 2
3 | (France) Thierry Tulasne | 4 | 6 | 6
5 | (United States) Sammy Giammalva | 6 | 2 | 3
(United Kingdom) Keith Gilbert | 3 | 4
(West Germany) Hans-Dieter Beutel | 6 | 6
(Australia) Wally Masur | 4 | 3
2 | (United States) Ben Testerman | 6 | 6

Semifinals
1 | (United States) Scott Davis | 3 | 6
3 | (France) Thierry Tulasne | 6 | 7'
(West Germany) Hans-Dieter Beutel | 6 | 6
2 | (United States) Ben Testerman | 3 | 3

Final
3 | (France) Thierry Tulasne | 6 | 3 | 6
(West Germany) Hans-Dieter Beutel | 4 | 6 | 4

=== Top half ===
==== Section 1 ====
First round
(Brazil) Pascual Penetta | 0 | 2
(India) Srinivasan Vasudevan | 6 | 6
(Sweden) Mats Wilander | 3 | 6 | 2
(United States) Howard Sands | 6 | 4 | 6
(United Kingdom) Jeremy Bates | 6 | 5 | 6
(Zimbabwe) Philip Tuckniss | 2 | 7 | 4
(Canada) Martin Wolstenholme | 6 | 4 | 1
(Argentina) Roberto Argüello | 1 | 6 | 6

Second round
1 | (United States) Scott Davis | 6 | 5 | 11
(India) S Vasudevan | 2 | 7 | 9
(West Germany) Christoph Zipf | 6 | 6
(United States) H Sands | 1 | 4
(Socialist Federal Republic of Yugoslavia) Slobodan Živojinović | 6 | 6
(United Kingdom) J Bates | 3 | 3
(Argentina) R Argüello | 6 | 1
7 | (Sweden) Jan Gunnarsson | 7 | 6

Third round
1 | (United States) S Davis | 6 | 6
(West Germany) C Zipf | 3 | 3
(Socialist Federal Republic of Yugoslavia) S Živojinović | 6 | 6
7 | (Sweden) J Gunnarsson | 3 | 4

Quarterfinals
1 | (United States) S Davis | 6 | 6
(Socialist Federal Republic of Yugoslavia) S Živojinović | 2 | 2

==== Section 2 ====
First round
3 | (France) Thierry Tulasne | 6 | 6
(South Africa) Barry Moir | 2 | 1
(Argentina) Carlos Castellan | 6 | 2
(Japan) Shigeyuki Nishio | 7 | 6
(Venezuela) Randolf Scheller | 2 | 4
(Canada) Glenn Michibata | 6 | 6
(Austria) Ingo Wimmer | 4 | 3
(South Africa) Christo van Rensburg | 6 | 6

Second round
3 | (France) T Tulasne | 3 | 7 | 6
(Thailand) Panomkorn Pladchurnil | 6 | 5 | 3
(Australia) Carl Limberger | 6 | 6
(Japan) S Nishio | 3 | 3
(Canada) G Michibata | 6 | 6
(Israel) Eylon Sinai | 1 | 1
(South Africa) C van Rensburg | 5 | 6 | 7
5 | (United States) Sammy Giammalva | 7 | 3 | 9

Third round
3 | (France) T Tulasne | 6 | 6
(Australia) C Limberger | 1 | 1
(Canada) G Michibata | 4 | 6
5 | (United States) S Giammalva | 6 | 7

Quarterfinals
3 | (France) T Tulasne | 4 | 6 | 6
5 | (United States) S Giammalva | 6 | 2 | 3

=== Bottom half ===
==== Section 3 ====
First round
(Barbados) Jimmy Tasker | 6 | 2 | 0
(Hong Kong) Kelvin Ng | 3 | 6 | 6
(United Kingdom) Keith Gilbert | 6 | 6 | 6
(Paraguay) Hugo Chapacú | 7 | 3 | 0
(Denmark) Peter Bastiansen | 5 | 2
(West Germany) Hans-Dieter Beutel | 7 | 6
(New Zealand) James Dunphy | 6 | 6
4 | (France) Henri Leconte | 4 | 3

Second round
6 | (Sweden) Stefan Svensson | 6 | 6
(Hong Kong) K Ng | 2 | 3
(Egypt) Tarek El-Sakka | 5 | 2
(United Kingdom) K Gilbert | 7 | 6
(West Germany) H-D Beutel | 6 | 6
(South Africa) Robbie Venter | 4 | 4
(Portugal) Pedro Cordeiro | w/o
(New Zealand) J Dunphy

Third round
6 | (Sweden) S Svensson | 3 | 0
(United Kingdom) K Gilbert | 6 | 6
(West Germany) H-D Beutel | 2 | 6 | 6
(New Zealand) J Dunphy | 6 | 4 | 2

Quarterfinals
(United Kingdom) K Gilbert | 3 | 4
(West Germany) H-D Beutel | 6 | 6

==== Section 4 ====
First round
8 | (Netherlands) Eric Wilborts | 5 | 5
(Australia) Wally Masur | 7 | 7
(United Kingdom) Steve Shaw | 6 | 6
(Israel) Shahar Perkiss | 4 | 4
(Australia) Craig Miller | 6 | 2 | 6
(Italy) Luca Bottazzi | 2 | 6 | 1
(Czechoslovakia) Libor Pimek | 6 | 7
(The Bahamas) Darren Roberts | 3 | 5

Second round
(Australia) W Masur | 6 | 6
(Brazil) Carlos Chabalgoity | 1 | 3
(United Kingdom) Peter Farrell | 7 | 6
(United Kingdom) S Shaw | 6 | 3
(Australia) C Miller | 6 | 6
(Venezuela) Fabio Mionbet | 3 | 1
(Czechoslovakia) L Pimek | 4 | 0
2 | (United States) Ben Testerman | 6 | 6

Third round
(Australia) W Masur | 6 | 6 | 6
(United Kingdom) P Farrell | 1 | 7 | 3
(Australia) C Miller | 6 | 6
2 | (United States) B Testerman | 7 | 7

Quarterfinals
(Australia) W Masur | 4 | 3
2 | (United States) B Testerman | 6 | 6
