= Leo Palin =

Finnish tennis player

- Country (sports): Finland
- Born: 20 October 1956 (age 68); Helsinki, Finland
- Height: 1.78 m (5 ft 10 in)
- Plays: Right-handed
- Prize money: $140,695

Singles
- Career record: 28–61
- Career titles: 0
- Highest ranking: No. 92 (17 May 1982)

Grand Slam singles results
- Australian Open: Q (1978)
- French Open: 2R (1982)
- Wimbledon: 2R (1982)
- US Open: 2R (1980, 1984)

Doubles
- Career record: 44–74
- Career titles: 1
- Highest ranking: No. 111 (28 July 1986)

Grand Slam doubles results
- Australian Open: 2R (1978)
- French Open: QF (1982)
- Wimbledon: 1R (1977, 1983)
- US Open: 1R (1980, 1981, 1982, 1983, 1984, 1985)

Leo Palin (born 20 October 1956) is a retired professional tennis player from Finland.

During his career on the ATP Tour, Palin won one doubles title, and reached one singles and one other doubles final. He reached career-high rankings of No. 92 in singles (in 1982) and No. 111 in doubles (in 1986).

== ATP Tour finals ==
=== Singles (1 loss) ===
Result	W/L	Date	Tournament	Surface	Opponent	Score
Loss	0–1	Dec 1981	Sofia, Bulgaria	Carpet (i)	(United States) Richard Meyer	4–6, 6–7, 6–7

=== Doubles (1 win, 1 loss) ===
Result	W/L	Date	Tournament	Surface	Partner	Opponents	Score
Loss	0–1	Mar 1980	Lagos, Nigeria	Clay	(Sweden) Kjell Johansson	(United States) Tony Graham (United States) Bruce Nichols	3–6, 6–0, 3–6
Win	1–1	Aug 1985	Cleveland, United States	Hard	(Finland) Olli Rahnasto	(United States) Hank Pfister (United States) Ben Testerman	6–3, 6–7, 7–6

== See also ==
- List of Finland Davis Cup team representatives
