= 1980 Wimbledon Championships – Men's doubles =

Men's doubles
- 1980 Wimbledon Championships

Final
- Champions: (Australia) Peter McNamara (Australia) Paul McNamee
- Runners-up: (United States) Bob Lutz (United States) Stan Smith
- Score: 7–6^{(7–5)}, 6–3, 6–7^{(4–7)}, 6–4

Details
- Draw: 64 (5 Q )
- Seeds: 16

Events
Singles	men	women		boys	girls
Doubles	men	women	mixed	boys	girls
← 1979 ·	Wimbledon Championships	· 1981 →

Peter Fleming and John McEnroe were the defending champions but lost in the semifinals to Peter McNamara and Paul McNamee.

McNamara and McNamee defeated Bob Lutz and Stan Smith in the final, 7–6^{(7–5)}, 6–3, 6–7^{(4–7)}, 6–4 to win the gentlemen's doubles title at the 1980 Wimbledon Championships.

== Seeds ==
1. (United States) Peter Fleming / (United States) John McEnroe (semifinals)
2. (United States) Marty Riessen / (United States) Sherwood Stewart (second round)
3. (United States) Brian Gottfried / (Mexico) Raúl Ramírez (quarterfinals)
4. (United States) Bob Lutz / (United States) Stan Smith (final)
5. (Poland) Wojciech Fibak / (Netherlands) Tom Okker (second round)
6. (Switzerland) Heinz Günthardt / (South Africa) Frew McMillan (quarterfinals)
7. (Australia) Peter McNamara / (Australia) Paul McNamee (champions)
8. (United States) Victor Amaya / (United States) Hank Pfister (quarterfinals)
9. n/a
10. (United States) Andrew Pattison / (United States) Butch Walts (first round)
11. (United States) Tim Gullikson / (United States) Tom Gullikson (second round)
12. (India) Anand Amritraj / (India) Vijay Amritraj (third round)
13. n/a
14. (United Kingdom) Buster Mottram / (Romania) Ilie Năstase (first round)
15. (United States) John Sadri / (United States) Tim Wilkison (third round)
16. (Australia) Rod Frawley / (Australia) Geoff Masters (third round)

Click on the seed number of a player to go to their draw section.

== Draw ==
=== Key ===
- Q = Qualifier
- WC = Wild card
- LL = Lucky loser
- Alt = Alternate
- ITF = ITF entry
- PR = Protected ranking
- SR = Special ranking
- SE = Special exempt
- JE = Junior exempt
- JR = Junior Accelerator Programme entrant
- CO = College Accelerator Programme entrant
- NG = Next Gen Accelerator Program entrant
- w/o = Walkover
- r = Retired
- d = Defaulted

=== Finals ===
Quarterfinals
1	(United States) Peter Fleming (United States) John McEnroe	6	6	5	6
6	(Switzerland) Heinz Günthardt (South Africa) Frew McMillan	3	4	7	4
3	(United States) Brian Gottfried (Mexico) Raúl Ramírez	3	6	6
7	(Australia) Peter McNamara (Australia) Paul McNamee	6	7	7
(South Africa) Kevin Curren (United States) Steve Denton	6	4	4
4	(United States) Bob Lutz (United States) Stan Smith	7	6	6
8	(United States) Victor Amaya (United States) Hank Pfister	6	2	6	5
(United States) Sandy Mayer (United States) Gene Mayer	4	6	7	7

Semifinals
1	(United States) Peter Fleming (United States) John McEnroe	3	2	3
7	(Australia) Peter McNamara (Australia) Paul McNamee	6	6	6
4	(United States) Bob Lutz (United States) Stan Smith	6	6	2	1	8
(United States) Sandy Mayer (United States) Gene Mayer	4	4	6	6	6

Final
7	(Australia) Peter McNamara (Australia) Paul McNamee	7^{7}	6	6^{4}	6
4	(United States) Bob Lutz (United States) Stan Smith	6^{5}	3	7^{7}	4

=== Top half ===
==== Section 1 ====
First round
1	(United States) P Fleming (United States) J McEnroe	7	6	7
(Australia) D Collings (Australia) W Hampson	6	4	5
(Australia) B Drewett (Australia) W Maher	7	6	6	4	4
(United States) E van Dillen (United States) V Van Patten	6	1	7	6	6
(Czechoslovakia) S Birner (Czechoslovakia) J Hřebec	3	4	1
LL	(Australia) A Gardiner (Australia) B Guan	6	6	6
(Paraguay) F Gonzalez (Chile) B Prajoux	7	6	5	6
14	(United Kingdom) C Mottram (Romania) I Năstase	6	4	7	4
10	(United States) A Pattison (United States) K Walts	6	4	1	7	4
(South Africa) C Drysdale (United States) A Kohlberg	4	6	6	6	6
(Argentina) A Gattiker (Argentina) C Gattiker	6	6	7	0	1
(United Kingdom) A Lloyd (United Kingdom) J Lloyd	7	4	6	6	6
(Australia) P Kronk (Australia) C Letcher	4	7	5	6
(Australia) M Edmondson (Australia) K Warwick	6	6	7	7
(United States) J Bailey (United States) R Kleege	6	4	3
6	(Switzerland) H Günthardt (South Africa) F McMillan	7	6	6

Second round
1	(United States) P Fleming (United States) J McEnroe	7	6	7
(United States) E van Dillen (United States) V Van Patten	6	1	5
LL	(Australia) A Gardiner (Australia) B Guan	6	3	7	6	1
(Paraguay) F Gonzalez (Chile) B Prajoux	3	6	6	7	6
(South Africa) C Drysdale (United States) A Kohlberg	2	6	6	6
(United Kingdom) A Lloyd (United Kingdom) J Lloyd	6	3	7	7
(Australia) M Edmondson (Australia) K Warwick	6	4	4	2
6	(Switzerland) H Günthardt (South Africa) F McMillan	1	6	6	6

Third round
1	(United States) P Fleming (United States) J McEnroe	7	7	6
(Paraguay) F Gonzalez (Chile) B Prajoux	5	5	2
(United Kingdom) A Lloyd (United Kingdom) J Lloyd	1	2	4
6	(Switzerland) H Günthardt (South Africa) F McMillan	6	6	6

Quarterfinals
1	(United States) P Fleming (United States) J McEnroe	6	6	5	6
6	(Switzerland) H Günthardt (South Africa) F McMillan	3	4	7	4

==== Section 2 ====
First round
3	(United States) B Gottfried (Mexico) R Ramírez	7	6	6
(United Kingdom) N Sears (United Kingdom) J Whiteford	6	2	0
Q	(Australia) J Fitzgerald (Australia) C Miller	4	6	6	4	5
Q	(Sweden) J Gunnarsson (Sweden) S Svensson	6	4	2	6	7
(Brazil) M Hocevar (Brazil) J Soares	2	1	6	6
(United States) B Manson (United States) W Martin	6	6	3	7
(Australia) V Eke (Australia) E Ewert	4	4	6
12	(India) A Amritraj (India) V Amritraj	6	6	7
15	(United States) J Sadri (United States) T Wilkison	6	7	6	7
(United States) T Graham (United States) B Nichols	7	6	4	6
(United States) C Mayotte (United States) L Stefanki	7	6	6
(United States) T Leonard (United States) G Malin	6	4	4
(United States) F Buehning (United States) F McNair	6	6	6	7	8
(United States) J Austin (United States) V Winitsky	1	7	7	6	6
(South Africa) B Bertram (South Africa) B Mitton	4	2	2
7	(Australia) P McNamara (Australia) P McNamee	6	6	6

Second round
3	(United States) B Gottfried (Mexico) R Ramírez	7	6	6
Q	(Sweden) J Gunnarsson (Sweden) S Svensson	5	2	2
(United States) B Manson (United States) W Martin	3	6	6	4
12	(India) A Amritraj (India) V Amritraj	6	3	7	6
15	(United States) J Sadri (United States) T Wilkison	6	6	6
(United States) C Mayotte (United States) L Stefanki	3	2	4
(United States) F Buehning (United States) F McNair	6	2	4
7	(Australia) P McNamara (Australia) P McNamee	7	6	6

Third round
3	(United States) B Gottfried (Mexico) R Ramírez	3	6	6	1	19
12	(India) A Amritraj (India) V Amritraj	6	3	2	6	17
15	(United States) J Sadri (United States) T Wilkison	4	3	6
7	(Australia) P McNamara (Australia) P McNamee	6	6	7

Quarterfinals
3	(United States) B Gottfried (Mexico) R Ramírez	3	6	6
7	(Australia) P McNamara (Australia) P McNamee	6	7	7

=== Bottom half ===
==== Section 3 ====
First round
5	(Poland) W Fibak (Netherlands) T Okker	4	6	7	6
(Australia) O Davidson (Australia) J Newcombe	6	3	5	4
(United States) F Taygan (United States) B Teacher	6	7	4	6
LL	(Australia) P Dellavedova (Australia) P Doohan	3	5	6	2
(South Africa) K Curren (United States) S Denton	6	7	7
(Australia) J James (Australia) C Kachel	4	6	6
LL	(United Kingdom) R Booth (United Kingdom) N Rayner	w/o
11	(United States) Ti Gullikson (United States) To Gullikson
LL	(Australia) C Johnstone (Australia) G Whitecross	3	7	6	6	6
(United States) S Carnahan (South Africa) J Yuill	6	5	7	4	4
Q	(United States) M Doyle (Republic of Ireland) S Sorensen	3	2	6
(United States) D Ralston (United States) R Tanner	6	6	7
Q	(United States) T Cain (Zimbabwe) H Ismail	4	4	6
(Australia) S Ball (Australia) R Case	6	6	7
(Egypt) I El Shafei (Australia) J Marks	3	3	4
4	(United States) R Lutz (United States) S Smith	6	6	6

Second round
5	(Poland) W Fibak (Netherlands) T Okker	5	3	3
(United States) F Taygan (United States) B Teacher	7	6	6
(South Africa) K Curren (United States) S Denton	2	6	4	6	6
11	(United States) Ti Gullikson (United States) To Gullikson	6	3	6	2	2
LL	(Australia) C Johnstone (Australia) G Whitecross	3	6	1	4
(United States) D Ralston (United States) R Tanner	6	3	6	6
(Australia) S Ball (Australia) R Case	6	7	5	7	4
4	(United States) R Lutz (United States) S Smith	7	5	7	5	6

Third round
(United States) F Taygan (United States) B Teacher	4	6	6	3
(South Africa) K Curren (United States) S Denton	6	7	2	6
(United States) D Ralston (United States) R Tanner	6	6	4	6
4	(United States) R Lutz (United States) S Smith	7	3	6	7

Quarterfinals
(South Africa) K Curren (United States) S Denton	6	4	4
4	(United States) R Lutz (United States) S Smith	7	6	6

==== Section 4 ====
First round
8	(United States) V Amaya (United States) H Pfister	6	7	4	7
(United States) P Rennert (United States) R Van't Hof	3	6	6	6
(United Kingdom) R Beven (United Kingdom) J Dier	6	7	2	5
(United Kingdom) A Jarrett (United Kingdom) J Smith	7	6	6	7
(United States) V Gerulaitis (Australia) F Stolle	7	6	6
(Brazil) T Koch (South Africa) R Moore	6	4	4
(United Kingdom) R Drysdale (United Kingdom) J Feaver	7	6	4	4
LL	(United States) C Edwards (South Africa) E Edwards	6	7	6	6
16	(Australia) R Frawley (Australia) G Masters	6	6	7
(Canada) J Brabenec (Pakistan) S Meer	2	3	6
Q	(United Kingdom) M Appleton (United Kingdom) J Paish	6	4	5	1
(United Kingdom) R Lewis (United Kingdom) D Lloyd	3	6	7	6
(Switzerland) C Dowdeswell (West Germany) J Fassbender	1	3	3
(United States) A Mayer (United States) E Mayer	6	6	6
(India) S Menon (South Africa) R Trogolo	6	3	6	3
2	(United States) M Riessen (United States) S Stewart	3	6	7	6

Second round
8	(United States) V Amaya (United States) H Pfister	6	6	6
(United Kingdom) A Jarrett (United Kingdom) J Smith	4	4	4
(United States) V Gerulaitis (Australia) F Stolle	7	6	6
LL	(United States) C Edwards (South Africa) E Edwards	6	3	3
16	(Australia) R Frawley (Australia) G Masters	6	6	6
(United Kingdom) R Lewis (United Kingdom) D Lloyd	1	4	1
(United States) A Mayer (United States) E Mayer	5	7	6	6
2	(United States) M Riessen (United States) S Stewart	7	6	2	4

Third round
8	(United States) V Amaya (United States) H Pfister
(United States) V Gerulaitis (Australia) F Stolle	w/o
16	(Australia) R Frawley (Australia) G Masters	4	6	3	4
(United States) A Mayer (United States) E Mayer	6	1	6	6

Quarterfinals
8	(United States) V Amaya (United States) H Pfister	6	2	6	5
(United States) A Mayer (United States) E Mayer	4	6	7	7
