= 1980 Wimbledon Championships – Mixed doubles =

Mixed doubles
- 1980 Wimbledon Championships

Final
- Champions: (United States) John Austin (United States) Tracy Austin
- Runners-up: (Australia) Mark Edmondson (Australia) Dianne Fromholtz
- Score: 4–6, 7–6^{(8–6)}, 6–3

Details
- Draw: 49 (3 Q )
- Seeds: 8

Events
Singles	men	women		boys	girls
Doubles	men	women	mixed	boys	girls
← 1979 ·	Wimbledon Championships	· 1981 →

John and Tracy Austin defeated Mark Edmondson and Dianne Fromholtz in the final, 4–6, 7–6^{(8–6)}, 6–3 to win the mixed doubles tennis title at the 1980 Wimbledon Championships.

Bob Hewitt and Greer Stevens were the reigning champions, but Hewitt did not compete. Stevens partnered with Colin Dowdeswell, but they lost to the Austins in the quarterfinals.

== Seeds ==
1. (South Africa) Frew McMillan / (Netherlands) Betty Stöve (semifinals)
2. (United States) Dick Stockton / (United States) Billie Jean King (quarterfinals)
3. (Australia) John Newcombe / (Australia) Evonne Cawley (second round)
4. (Australia) Ross Case / (Australia) Wendy Turnbull (semifinals)
5. (India) Vijay Amritraj / (United States) Anne Smith (second round)
6. (Australia) Mark Edmondson / (Australia) Dianne Fromholtz (final)
7. (Switzerland) Colin Dowdeswell / (South Africa) Greer Stevens (quarterfinals)
8. (India) Anand Amritraj / (United States) Rosemary Casals (quarterfinals)

Click on the seed number of a player to go to their draw section.

== Draw ==
=== Key ===
- Q = Qualifier
- WC = Wild card
- LL = Lucky loser
- Alt = Alternate
- SE = Special exempt
- PR = Protected ranking
- ITF = ITF entry
- JE = Junior exempt
- w/o = Walkover
- r = Retired
- d = Defaulted
- SR = Special ranking

=== Finals ===
Quarterfinals
1	(South Africa) Frew McMillan (Netherlands) Betty Stöve	7	6
(United States) Tom Leonard (United States) Ann Kiyomura	5	2
(United States) John Austin (United States) Tracy Austin	7	6
7	(Switzerland) Colin Dowdeswell (South Africa) Greer Stevens	6	1
8	(India) Anand Amritraj (United States) Rosie Casals	1	6	1
4	(Australia) Ross Case (Australia) Wendy Turnbull	6	4	6
6	(Australia) Mark Edmondson (Australia) Dianne Fromholtz	6	7
2	(United States) Dick Stockton (United States) Billie Jean King	3	6

Semifinals
1	(South Africa) Frew McMillan (Netherlands) Betty Stöve	4	2
(United States) John Austin (United States) Tracy Austin	6	6
4	(Australia) Ross Case (Australia) Wendy Turnbull	6	4
6	(Australia) Mark Edmondson (Australia) Dianne Fromholtz	7	6

Final
(United States) John Austin (United States) Tracy Austin	4	7^{8}	6
6	(Australia) Mark Edmondson (Australia) Dianne Fromholtz	6	6^{6}	3

=== Top half ===
==== Section 1 ====
First round
(Paraguay) V Pecci (Brazil) M Bueno	6	6
Q	(Japan) J Kamiwazumi (Japan) N Sato	4	4
(United Kingdom) A Jarrett (United Kingdom) D Jevans	w/o
(Brazil) T Koch (Argentina) R Giscafré
(United States) T Leonard (United States) A Kiyomura	7	6
(United Kingdom) J Feaver (South Africa) T Harford	6	4
(Australia) J Marks (Czechoslovakia) R Tomanová	6	7
Q	(Australia) C Letcher (Australia) C Griffiths	4	5

Second round
1	(South Africa) F McMillan (Netherlands) B Stöve	w/o
(Paraguay) V Pecci (Brazil) M Bueno
(United Kingdom) A Jarrett (United Kingdom) D Jevans	w/o
(United States) V Winitsky (United States) R Fox
(United States) T Leonard (United States) A Kiyomura	3	6	6
(United Kingdom) D Lloyd (United Kingdom) L Charles	6	3	2
(Australia) J Marks (Czechoslovakia) R Tomanová	6	6	6
5	(India) V Amritraj (United States) A Smith	3	7	2

Third round
1	(South Africa) F McMillan (Netherlands) B Stöve	6	6
(United Kingdom) A Jarrett (United Kingdom) D Jevans	2	2
(United States) T Leonard (United States) A Kiyomura	1	6	6
(Australia) J Marks (Czechoslovakia) R Tomanová	6	3	2

Quarterfinals
1	(South Africa) F McMillan (Netherlands) B Stöve	7	6
(United States) T Leonard (United States) A Kiyomura	5	2

==== Section 2 ====
First round
3	(Australia) J Newcombe (Australia) E Cawley	6	7	7
(United Kingdom) R Beven (United Kingdom) A Hobbs	7	5	5
(United States) F McNair (West Germany) B Bunge	3	6	6
(Australia) O Davidson (United States) A Jaeger	6	4	3
Q	(South Africa) S van der Merwe (South Africa) Y Vermaak	3	6
(United States) D Ralston (United States) J Russell	6	7
(Australia) C Kachel (Australia) P Whytcross	3	6
7	(Switzerland) C Dowdeswell (South Africa) G Stevens	6	7

Second round
3	(Australia) J Newcombe (Australia) E Cawley	6	6	4
(United States) J Austin (United States) T Austin	2	7	6
(South Africa) B Mitton (South Africa) I Kloss	7	6
(United States) F McNair (West Germany) B Bunge	6	4
(United States) D Ralston (United States) J Russell	7	4	6
(United Kingdom) J Dier (United Kingdom) J Durie	6	6	1
(United States) C Lewis (United States) L Allen
7	(Switzerland) C Dowdeswell (South Africa) G Stevens	w/o

Third round
(United States) J Austin (United States) T Austin	6	6
(South Africa) B Mitton (South Africa) I Kloss	4	2
(United States) D Ralston (United States) J Russell
7	(Switzerland) C Dowdeswell (South Africa) G Stevens	w/o

Quarterfinals
(United States) J Austin (United States) T Austin	7	6
7	(Switzerland) C Dowdeswell (South Africa) G Stevens	6	1

=== Bottom half ===
==== Section 3 ====
First round
8	(India) A Amritraj (United States) R Casals	6	7
(United Kingdom) R Taylor (Italy) S Simmonds	2	6
(Australia) P McNamara (Australia) E Little	w/o
(Paraguay) F González (United States) E Nagelsen
(Romania) I Țiriac (Romania) V Ruzici
(South Africa) J Yuill (South Africa) R Fairbank	w/o
(Chile) E Aguirre (United Kingdom) V Wade	w/o
(United States) M Doyle (United States) K Latham
(United States) B Teacher (United States) K Teacher	w/o
(United States) P Rennert (United States) K Jordan

Second round
8	(India) A Amritraj (United States) R Casals	6	6
(Australia) P McNamara (Australia) E Little	4	4
(South Africa) J Yuill (South Africa) R Fairbank	w/o
(Australia) F Stolle (United States) B Potter
(Chile) E Aguirre (United Kingdom) V Wade	4	7	1
(United Kingdom) C Mottram (Romania) F Mihai	6	6	6
(United States) B Teacher (United States) K Teacher	6	2
4	(Australia) R Case (Australia) W Turnbull	7	6

Third round
8	(India) A Amritraj (United States) R Casals	w/o
(South Africa) J Yuill (South Africa) R Fairbank
(United Kingdom) C Mottram (Romania) F Mihai	3	5
4	(Australia) R Case (Australia) W Turnbull	6	7

Quarterfinals
8	(India) A Amritraj (United States) R Casals	1	6	1
4	(Australia) R Case (Australia) W Turnbull	6	4	6

==== Section 4 ====
First round
(United Kingdom) W Davies (United Kingdom) C Drury	5	4
(Australia) R Ruffels (Australia) S Leo	7	6
(Australia) P Dent (United States) BA Dent
(United States) R Van't Hof (United States) D Desfor	w/o
(Argentina) JL Clerc (Chile) M Rodríguez	w/o
(United States) S Krulevitz (South Korea) D-h Lee
(Ecuador) A Gómez (Argentina) V Segal
2	(United States) R Stockton (United States) BJ King	w/o

Second round
6	(Australia) M Edmondson (Australia) D Fromholtz	7	6
(Australia) R Ruffels (Australia) S Leo	5	2
(United States) D Sherbeck (United States) J Stratton	w/o
(United States) R Van't Hof (United States) D Desfor
(Argentina) JL Clerc (Chile) M Rodríguez	w/o
(United States) G Malin (United States) L Morse
(United Kingdom) R Drysdale (United States) P Bostrom
2	(United States) R Stockton (United States) BJ King	w/o

Third round
6	(Australia) M Edmondson (Australia) D Fromholtz	2	6	6
(United States) D Sherbeck (United States) J Stratton	6	3	3
(Argentina) JL Clerc (Chile) M Rodríguez	3	0
2	(United States) R Stockton (United States) BJ King	6	6

Quarterfinals
6	(Australia) M Edmondson (Australia) D Fromholtz	6	7
2	(United States) R Stockton (United States) BJ King	3	6
