= 1980 Wimbledon Championships =

- Date: 23 June – 5 July
- Edition: 94th
- Category: Grand Slam
- Draw: 128S/64D/49XD
- Prize money: £293,464
- Surface: Grass
- Location: Church Road; SW19, Wimbledon, London, United Kingdom
- Venue: All England Lawn Tennis and Croquet Club

Champions

Men's singles
- (Sweden) Björn Borg

Women's singles
- (Australia) Evonne Goolagong Cawley

Men's doubles
- (Australia) Peter McNamara / (Australia) Paul McNamee

Women's doubles
- (United States) Kathy Jordan / (United States) Anne Smith

Mixed doubles
- (United States) John Austin / (United States) Tracy Austin

Boys' singles
- (France) Thierry Tulasne

Girls' singles
- (Australia) Debbie Freeman
← 1979 ·	Wimbledon Championships	· 1981 →

The 1980 Wimbledon Championships was a tennis tournament that took place on the outdoor grass courts at the All England Lawn Tennis and Croquet Club in Wimbledon, London, United Kingdom. The tournament ran from 23 June until 5 July. It was the 94th staging of the Wimbledon Championships, and the second Grand Slam tennis event of 1980.

== Prize money ==
The total prize money for 1980 championships was £293,464. The winner of the men's title earned £20,000 while the women's singles champion earned £18,000.

Event	W	F	SF	QF	Round of 16	Round of 32	Round of 64	Round of 128
Men's singles	£20,000	£10,000	£5,000	£2,500	£1,600	£850	£500	£300
Women's singles	£18,000	£8,750	£4,375	£2,000	£1,245	£660	£390	£230
Men's doubles *	£8,400	£4,200	£2,100	£1,050	£570	£190	£90	—
Women's doubles *	£7,276	£3,638	£1,680	£840	£400	£130	£62	—
Mixed doubles *	£4,420	£2,210	£1,050	£520	£260	£0	£0	—

_{* per team}

== Champions ==
=== Seniors ===
==== Men's singles ====
(Sweden) Björn Borg defeated (United States) John McEnroe, 1–6, 7–5, 6–3, 6–7^{(16–18)}, 8–6

- It was Borg's 10th career Grand Slam singles title and his 5th and last title at Wimbledon.

==== Women's singles ====
(Australia) Evonne Goolagong Cawley defeated (United States) Chris Evert Lloyd 6–1, 7–6^{(7–4)}

- It was Cawley's 7th and last career Grand Slam singles title and her 2nd title at Wimbledon.

==== Men's doubles ====
(Australia) Peter McNamara / (Australia) Paul McNamee defeated (United States) Bob Lutz / (United States) Stan Smith, 7–6^{(7–5)}, 6–3, 6–7^{(4–7)}, 6–4

- It was McNamara's 2nd career Grand Slam title and his 1st Wimbledon title. It was McNamee's 2nd career Grand Slam title and his 1st Wimbledon title.

==== Women's doubles ====
(United States) Kathy Jordan / (United States) Anne Smith defeated (United States) Rosie Casals / (Australia) Wendy Turnbull, 4–6, 7–5, 6–1

- It was Jordan's 2nd career Grand Slam title and her 1st Wimbledon title. It was Smith's 3rd career Grand Slam title and her 1st Wimbledon title.

==== Mixed doubles ====
(United States) John Austin / (United States) Tracy Austin defeated (Australia) Mark Edmondson / (Australia) Dianne Fromholtz, 4–6, 7–6 ^{(8–6)}, 6–3

- It was John Austin's only career Grand Slam title. It was Tracy Austin's 2nd career Grand Slam title and her only Wimbledon title.

=== Juniors ===
==== Boys' singles ====
(France) Thierry Tulasne defeated (West Germany) Hans-Dieter Beutel, 6–4, 3–6, 6–4

==== Girls' singles ====
(Australia) Debbie Freeman defeated (Australia) Susan Leo, 7–6, 7–5

== Singles seeds ==
=== Men's singles ===
1. (Sweden) Björn Borg (champion)
2. (United States) John McEnroe (final, lost to Björn Borg)
3. (United States) Jimmy Connors (semifinals, lost to John McEnroe)
4. (United States) Vitas Gerulaitis (fourth round, lost to Wojciech Fibak)
5. (United States) Roscoe Tanner (quarterfinals, lost to Jimmy Connors)
6. (United States) Gene Mayer (quarterfinals, lost to Björn Borg)
7. (United States) Peter Fleming (quarterfinals, lost to John McEnroe)
8. (Paraguay) Víctor Pecci (third round, lost to Phil Dent)
9. (United States) Pat DuPré (third round, lost to Nick Saviano)
10. (Czechoslovakia) Ivan Lendl (third round, lost to Colin Dibley)
11. (United States) Harold Solomon (withdrew before the tournament began)
12. (France) Yannick Noah (withdrew before the tournament began)
13. (Poland) Wojciech Fibak (quarterfinals, lost to Brian Gottfried)
14. (United States) Victor Amaya (first round, lost to Hank Pfister)
15. (United States) Stan Smith (third round, lost to Brian Gottfried)
16. (Argentina) José Luis Clerc (third round, lost to Onny Parun)

=== Women's singles ===
1. (United States) Martina Navratilova (semifinals, lost to Chris Evert Lloyd)
2. (United States) Tracy Austin (semifinals, lost to Evonne Goolagong Cawley)
3. (United States) Chris Evert Lloyd (final, lost to Evonne Goolagong Cawley)
4. (Australia) Evonne Goolagong Cawley (champion)
5. (United States) Billie Jean King (quarterfinals, lost to Martina Navratilova)
6. (Australia) Wendy Turnbull (quarterfinals, lost to Evonne Goolagong Cawley)
7. (United Kingdom) Virginia Wade (fourth round, lost to Andrea Jaeger)
8. (Australia) Dianne Fromholtz (fourth round, lost to Greer Stevens)
9. (Czechoslovakia) Hana Mandlíková (fourth round, lost to Evonne Goolagong Cawley)
10. (United States) Kathy Jordan (fourth round, lost to Martina Navratilova)
11. (South Africa) Greer Stevens (quarterfinals, lost to Tracy Austin)
12. (Romania) Virginia Ruzici (second round, lost to JoAnne Russell)
13. (United Kingdom) Sue Barker (second round, lost to Betty Ann Dent)
14. (United States) Andrea Jaeger (quarterfinals, lost to Chris Evert Lloyd)
15. (Czechoslovakia) Regina Maršíková (second round, lost to Sue Saliba)
16. (West Germany) Sylvia Hanika (second round, lost to Pam Shriver)

Preceded by 1980 French Open	Grand Slams	Succeeded by 1980 US Open
