= Debbie Freeman =

Australian tennis player

Deborah Freeman
- Country (sports): Australia
- Residence: Australia
- Born: 5 June 1962 (age 64) Sydney, Australia
- Plays: Right-handed (one-handed backhand)

Singles
- Career record: 2–12

Grand Slam singles results
- Australian Open: 1r (1983)
- French Open: 1r (1981)
- Wimbledon: 1r (1981, 1983)
- US Open: 1r (1981)

Doubles
- Career record: 0–4
- Last updated on: 7 August 2007.

Debbie Freeman (born 5 June 1962) is an Australian former tennis player who won Junior Wimbledon in 1980.

In 1978, Freeman won the Australian Open Girls' Doubles title with Kathy Mantle.

In 1980, Freeman became the first Australian to win Girls' Singles title at Wimbledon. Freeman received a telegram from the Prime Minister of Australia, Malcolm Fraser, congratulating her on her win. The next Australian to win the Junior Girls Wimbledon title was Ashleigh Barty in 2011.

Freeman failed to capitalise on her Junior titles, losing first-round matches at the US Open, Wimbledon and the French Open in the following year. She retired from professional tennis soon after.
