= 1978 Wimbledon Championships – Men's singles qualifying =

Men's singles qualifying
- 1978 Wimbledon Championships

Events
| Singles | men | women | | boys | girls |
| Doubles | men | women | mixed | boys | girls |
| WC Singles | men | women | quad |
| WC Doubles | men | women | quad |
| Legends | men | women | seniors |

Qualification
| Singles | men | women |
| Doubles | men | women | mixed |
- Wimbledon Championships

Players who neither had high enough rankings nor received wild cards to enter the main draw of the annual Wimbledon Tennis Championships participated in a qualifying tournament held one week before the event. Several players withdrew from the main draw after qualifying had commenced, leading to the highest ranked players who lost in the final qualifying round to be entered into the main draw as lucky losers.

== Seeds ==
1. (Czechoslovakia) Stanislav Birner (qualifying competition, lucky loser)
2. (United States) Bruce Manson (qualifying competition, lucky loser)
3. (Australia) John Marks (qualified)
4. (United States) Peter Pearson (first round)
5. (Australia) Rod Frawley (qualified)
6. (United States) Erik van Dillen (qualified)
7. (United States) Johan Kriek (qualified)
8. (Sweden) Douglas Palm (qualifying competition, lucky loser)
9. (Australia) David Carter (qualifying competition, lucky loser)
10. (United States) Mike Machette (qualifying competition, lucky loser)
11. (Australia) Chris Kachel (qualified)
12. (Australia) Bob Carmichael (qualified)
13. (Chile) Álvaro Fillol (qualified)
14. (Venezuela) Jorge Andrew (second round)
15. (India) Sashi Menon (qualifying competition)
16. (Australia) Mark Edmondson (qualified)
17. (United States) John Austin (first round)
18. (Austria) Peter Feigl (qualifying competition)
19. (United States) Fred McNair (qualified)
20. (United States) Charlie Pasarell (first round)
21. (Sweden) Tenny Svensson (first round)
22. (South Africa) David Schneider (qualified)
23. (United Kingdom) Michael Wayman (qualified)
24. (Australia) Dale Collings (qualified)
25. (United States) Armistead Neely (second round)
26. (Sweden) Jan Norbäck (second round)
27. (United States) Joel Bailey (qualified)
28. (Australia) Warren Maher (qualifying competition)
29. (Australia) Brad Drewett (qualifying competition)
30. (United States) William Lofgren (qualifying competition)
31. (United States) Scott Carnahan (first round)
32. (United States) Chico Hagey (qualifying competition)

== Qualifiers ==
1. (United Kingdom) Mark Farrell
2. (Czechoslovakia) Jan Šimbera
3. (Australia) John Marks
4. (India) Jayakumar Royappa
5. (Australia) Rod Frawley
6. (United States) Erik van Dillen
7. (United States) Johan Kriek
8. (United States) Fred McNair
9. (United Kingdom) Michael Wayman
10. (South Africa) David Schneider
11. (Australia) Chris Kachel
12. (Australia) Bob Carmichael
13. (Chile) Álvaro Fillol
14. (Australia) Dale Collings
15. (United States) Joel Bailey
16. (Australia) Mark Edmondson

== Lucky losers ==
1. (Sweden) Douglas Palm
2. (United States) Bruce Manson
3. (Czechoslovakia) Stanislav Birner
4. (United States) Mike Machette
5. (Australia) David Carter

== Qualifying draw ==
Key

- Q = Qualifier
- WC = Wild card
- LL = Lucky loser
- Alt = Alternate
- ITF = ITF entry
- PR = Protected ranking
- SR = Special ranking
- SE = Special exempt
- JE = Junior exempt
- JR = Junior Accelerator Programme entrant
- CO = College Accelerator Programme entrant
- NG = Next Gen Accelerator Program entrant
- w/o = Walkover
- r = Retired
- d = Defaulted

=== First qualifier ===
First round
1 | (Czechoslovakia) Stanislav Birner | 6 | 6
(United States) Mark Wagner | 0 | 3
(United Kingdom) Neil Rayner | 8 | 3 | 6
(Australia) Peter Campbell | 6 | 6 | 4
(Argentina) Tito Vázquez | 4 | 6 | 6
(United States) Bobby Webb | 6 | 3 | 4
(United Kingdom) Mark Farrell | 6 | 7
17 | (United States) John Austin | 4 | 5

Second round
1 | (Czechoslovakia) Stanislav Birner | 4 | 6 | 6
(United Kingdom) Neil Rayner | 6 | 2 | 1
(Argentina) Tito Vázquez | 8 | 8 | 7
(United Kingdom) Mark Farrell | 6 | 9 | 9

Qualifying competition
1 | (Czechoslovakia) Stanislav Birner | 5 | 3 | 4
(United Kingdom) Mark Farrell | 7 | 6 | 6

=== Second qualifier ===
First round
2 | (United States) Bruce Manson | 6 | 6
(South Africa) Glenn Grisillo | 3 | 1
(United Kingdom) Willie Davies | 6 | 6
(Japan) Takao Yamamoto | 3 | 2
(Australia) Robert Casey | 8 | 3 | 6
(Australia) Noel Callaghan | 6 | 6 | 2
(Czechoslovakia) Jan Šimbera | 7 | 6
20 | (United States) Charlie Pasarell | 5 | 3

Second round
2 | (United States) Bruce Manson | 6 | 1 | 6
(United Kingdom) Willie Davies | 4 | 6 | 4
(Australia) Robert Casey | 4 | 8
(Czechoslovakia) Jan Šimbera | 6 | 9

Qualifying competition
2 | (United States) Bruce Manson | 8 | 4 | 4
(Czechoslovakia) Jan Šimbera | 9 | 6 | 6

=== Third qualifier ===
First round
3 | (Australia) John Marks | 6 | 6
(United States) Randall Verdieck | 2 | 2
(Spain) José López-Maeso | 3 | 8 | 7
(Australia) Michael Fancutt | 6 | 6 | 5
(Uruguay) José Luis Damiani | 7 | 6
(United States) Howard Hauptman | 5 | 1
(United Kingdom) Harvey Becker | 4 | 1
25 | (United States) Armistead Neely | 6 | 6

Second round
3 | (Australia) John Marks | 6 | 6
(Spain) José López-Maeso | 2 | 1
(Uruguay) José Luis Damiani | 6 | 6 | 6
25 | (United States) Armistead Neely | 8 | 4 | 2

Qualifying competition
3 | (Australia) John Marks | 9 | 6 | 6
(Uruguay) José Luis Damiani | 7 | 3 | 0

=== Fourth qualifier ===
First round
4 | (United States) Peter Pearson | 1 | 6
(Japan) Kiyoshi Tanabe | 6 | 8
(India) Jayakumar Royappa | 9 | 6
(Japan) Jun Kamiwazumi | 7 | 3
(United Kingdom) John Whiteford | 6 | 6
(Australia) Warren Girle | 4 | 4
(Chile) Antonio Hartmann | 1 | 1
28 | (Australia) Warren Maher | 6 | 6

Second round
(Japan) Kiyoshi Tanabe | 6 | 1
(India) Jayakumar Royappa | 8 | 6
(United Kingdom) John Whiteford | 3 | 4
28 | (Australia) Warren Maher | 6 | 6

Qualifying competition
(India) Jayakumar Royappa | 6 | 6 | 7
28 | (Australia) Warren Maher | 3 | 2 | 5

=== Fifth qualifier ===
First round
5 | (Australia) Rod Frawley | 6
(United Kingdom) Rohun Beven | 0^{r}
(Australia) Victor Eke | 6 | 4 | 6
(Finland) Leo Palin | 3 | 6 | 3
(United Kingdom) Kevin Harris | 3 | 6 | 6
(Australia) Simon Clarke | 6 | 3 | 2
(United States) Raz Reid | 1 | 1
18 | (Austria) Peter Feigl | 6 | 6

Second round
5 | (Australia) Rod Frawley | 6 | 6
(Australia) Victor Eke | 4 | 3
(United Kingdom) Kevin Harris | 8 | 4
18 | (Austria) Peter Feigl | 9 | 6

Qualifying competition
5 | (Australia) Rod Frawley | 6 | 2
18 | (Austria) Peter Feigl | 3 | 1^{r}

=== Sixth qualifier ===
First round
6 | (United States) Erik van Dillen | 6 | 6
(Pakistan) Jamil Ahmed | 1 | 3
(New Zealand) Gary Slater | 8 | 7 | 13
(United Kingdom) Trevor Heath | 9 | 5 | 11
(Australia) Chris Johnstone | 6 | 6
(United Kingdom) Tony Lloyd | 4 | 2
(Australia) Wayne Cowley | 6 | 6
31 | (United States) Scott Carnahan | 3 | 3

Second round
6 | (United States) Erik van Dillen | 9 | 6
(New Zealand) Gary Slater | 8 | 1
(Australia) Chris Johnstone | 7 | 7 | 3
(Australia) Wayne Cowley | 5 | 9 | 6

Qualifying competition
6 | (United States) Erik van Dillen | 9 | 6 | 6
(Australia) Wayne Cowley | 7 | 0 | 0

=== Seventh qualifier ===
First round
7 | (United States) Johan Kriek | 6 | 6
(New Zealand) Jay Harvey | 3 | 3
(Austria) Robert Reininger | 6 | 6
(Australia) Bill Gilmour | 4 | 2
(United States) John Beritzhoff | 6 | 8
(Argentina) Alejandro Ganzábal | 3 | 6
(Australia) Graeme Thomson | 2 | 2
30 | (United States) William Lofgren | 6 | 6

Second round
7 | (United States) Johan Kriek | 6 | 6
(Austria) Robert Reininger | 3 | 0
(United States) John Beritzhoff | 4 | 8
30 | (United States) William Lofgren | 6 | 9

Qualifying competition
7 | (United States) Johan Kriek | 6 | 6 | 6
30 | (United States) William Lofgren | 1 | 4 | 3

=== Eighth qualifier ===
First round
8 | (Sweden) Douglas Palm | 6 | 6
(Japan) Tetsu Kuramitsu | 1 | 3
(United Kingdom) Stephen Alger | 6 | 8 | 6
(Australia) Keith Hancock | 4 | 9 | 4
(Japan) Kenichi Hirai | 5 | 6 | 6
(Nigeria) David Imonitie | 7 | 4 | 2
(United States) Gary Albertine | 0 | 5
19 | (United States) Fred McNair | 6 | 7

Second round
8 | (Sweden) Douglas Palm | 7 | 6
(United Kingdom) Stephen Alger | 5 | 3
(Japan) Kenichi Hirai | 1 | 3
19 | (United States) Fred McNair | 6 | 6

Qualifying competition
8 | (Sweden) Douglas Palm | 8 | 0^{r}
19 | (United States) Fred McNair | 9 | 6

=== Ninth qualifier ===
First round
9 | (Australia) David Carter | 6 | 8
(Mexico) Roberto Chávez | 1 | 6
(United States) Jim McManus | 6 | 6
(United States) Dean Martin | 4 | 1
(Pakistan) Saeed Meer | 6 | 7
(United States) Tom Loucks | 4 | 5
(New Zealand) Malcolm Elley | 6 | 2
23 | (United Kingdom) Michael Wayman | 8 | 6

Second round
9 | (Australia) David Carter | 6 | 6
(United States) Jim McManus | 3 | 0
(Pakistan) Saeed Meer | 2 | 4
23 | (United Kingdom) Michael Wayman | 6 | 6

Qualifying competition
9 | (Australia) David Carter | 2 | 6 | 2 | 4
23 | (United Kingdom) Michael Wayman | 6 | 1 | 6 | 6

=== Tenth qualifier ===
First round
10 | (United States) Mike Machette | 4 | 6 | 6
(United Kingdom) Martin West | 6 | 2 | 4
(France) Jean-Baptiste Chanfreau | 6 | 6
(Australia) David Whyte | 4 | 1
(Australia) Pat Serret | 6 | 8
(South Africa) P Vienings | 4 | 6
(United States) Randall Schneider | 1 | 5
22 | (South Africa) David Schneider | 6 | 7

Second round
10 | (United States) Mike Machette | 6 | 6
(France) Jean-Baptiste Chanfreau | 4 | 4
(Australia) Pat Serret | 3 | 2
22 | (South Africa) David Schneider | 6 | 6

Qualifying competition
10 | (United States) Mike Machette | 6 | 3 | 4
22 | (South Africa) David Schneider | 8 | 6 | 6

=== Eleventh qualifier ===
First round
11 | (Australia) Chris Kachel | 6 | 6
(United Kingdom) Jeremy Dier | 2 | 4
(United Kingdom) Paul Blincow | 6 | 6
(United States) R Luebbe | 1 | 1
(India) Ramesh Krishnan | 6 | 6
(South Africa) Mike Myburg | 1 | 4
(United Kingdom) Christopher Wells | 7 | 6 | 6
21 | (Sweden) Tenny Svensson | 9 | 3 | 4

Second round
11 | (Australia) Chris Kachel | 5 | 6 | 6
(United Kingdom) Paul Blincow | 7 | 4 | 3
(India) Ramesh Krishnan | 6 | 6
(United Kingdom) Christopher Wells | 2 | 4

Qualifying competition
11 | (Australia) Chris Kachel | 9 | 7 | 7
(India) Ramesh Krishnan | 7 | 5 | 5

=== Twelfth qualifier ===
First round
12 | (Australia) Bob Carmichael | 6 | 6
(Brazil) Jose-Edison Mandarino | 2 | 0
(Republic of Ireland) Sean Sorensen | 6 | 6
(United States) Paul Gerken | 3 | 2
(Australia) Charlie Fancutt | 6 | 9
(United States) Vincent Van Patten | 4 | 7
(Chile) Ricardo Eynaudi | 1 | 5
29 | (Australia) Brad Drewett | 6 | 7

Second round
12 | (Australia) Bob Carmichael | 6 | 6
(Republic of Ireland) Sean Sorensen | 2 | 3
(Australia) Charlie Fancutt | 7 | 2
29 | (Australia) Brad Drewett | 9 | 6

Qualifying competition
12 | (Australia) Bob Carmichael | 6 | 6 | 9
29 | (Australia) Brad Drewett | 4 | 2 | 7

=== Thirteenth qualifier ===
First round
13 | (Chile) Álvaro Fillol | 6 | 6
(Haiti) M Louis | 1 | 0
(United Kingdom) Nigel Sears | 6 | 6
(United States) Jeff Edwards | 3 | 3
(United States) Sam Vuille | 9 | 3 | 6
(New Zealand) Peter Hampton | 8 | 6 | 3
(Brazil) Cássio Motta | 1 | 6 | 3
26 | (Sweden) Jan Norbäck | 6 | 1 | 6

Second round
13 | (Chile) Álvaro Fillol | 3 | 9 | 6
(United Kingdom) Nigel Sears | 6 | 8 | 2
(United States) Sam Vuille | 6 | 3 | 6
26 | (Sweden) Jan Norbäck | 4 | 6 | 3

Qualifying competition
13 | (Chile) Álvaro Fillol | 6 | 7 | 9
(United States) Sam Vuille | 2 | 5 | 8

=== Fourteenth qualifier ===
First round
14 | (Venezuela) Jorge Andrew | 9 | 6
(United Kingdom) Robert Booth | 7 | 3
(Australia) John Trickey | 7 | 6
(Nigeria) Nduka Odizor | 5 | 3
(United Kingdom) Michael Appleton | 6 | 6
(Colombia) Carlos Behar | 4 | 4
(United States) Gordon Jones | 3 | 8
24 | (Australia) Dale Collings | 6 | 9

Second round
14 | (Venezuela) Jorge Andrew | w/o
(Australia) John Trickey
(United Kingdom) Michael Appleton | 4 | 0
24 | (Australia) Dale Collings | 6 | 6

Qualifying competition
(Australia) John Trickey | 2 | 8 | 1
24 | (Australia) Dale Collings | 6 | 9 | 6

=== Fifteenth qualifier ===
First round
15 | (India) Sashi Menon | 6 | 6
(Colombia) Alejandro Cortes | 4 | 3
(Australia) Stephen Myers | 6 | 6
(Pakistan) Nadir Ali Khan | 2 | 3
(Australia) Robert Keighery | 6 | 6
(United States) John Hubbell | 1 | 1
(Nigeria) Tony Mmoh | 1 | 0
27 | (United States) Joel Bailey | 6 | 6

Second round
15 | (India) Sashi Menon | 6 | 6
(Australia) Stephen Myers | 2 | 2
(Australia) Robert Keighery | 9 | 4 | 2
27 | (United States) Joel Bailey | 7 | 6 | 6

Qualifying competition
15 | (India) Sashi Menon | 4 | 5 | 1^{r}
27 | (United States) Joel Bailey | 6 | 7 | 2

=== Sixteenth qualifier ===
First round
16 | (Australia) Mark Edmondson | 8 | 6
(United States) Dennis Gibson | 6 | 3
(Argentina) Roberto Uello | 6 | 6
(United Kingdom) P Russell | 1 | 1
(Australia) Ray Kelly | 9 | 8
(Australia) Wayne Hampson | 8 | 6
(United States) Ben Sweren | 2 | 1
32 | (United States) Chico Hagey | 6 | 6

Second round
16 | (Australia) Mark Edmondson | 6 | 6
(Argentina) Roberto Uello | 0 | 2
(Australia) Ray Kelly | 2 | 3
32 | (United States) Chico Hagey | 6 | 6

Qualifying competition
16 | (Australia) Mark Edmondson | 6 | 6 | 6
32 | (United States) Chico Hagey | 3 | 4 | 2
