= 1978 Wimbledon Championships – Men's doubles =

Men's doubles
- 1978 Wimbledon Championships

Final
- Champions: (South Africa) Bob Hewitt (South Africa) Frew McMillan
- Runners-up: (United States) Peter Fleming (United States) John McEnroe
- Score: 6–1, 6–4, 6–2

Details
- Draw: 64 (5 Q )
- Seeds: 16

Events
Singles	men	women		boys	girls
Doubles	men	women	mixed	boys	girls
← 1977 ·	Wimbledon Championships	· 1979 →

Ross Case and Geoff Masters were the defending champions, but lost in the second round to Mark Edmondson and John Marks.

Bob Hewitt and Frew McMillan defeated Peter Fleming and John McEnroe in the final, 6–1, 6–4, 6–2 to win the gentlemen's doubles title at the 1978 Wimbledon Championships.

== Seeds ==
1. (South Africa) Bob Hewitt / (South Africa) Frew McMillan (champions)
2. (Poland) Wojciech Fibak / (Netherlands) Tom Okker (semifinals)
3. (United States) Bob Lutz / (United States) Stan Smith (second round)
4. (Australia) John Alexander / (Australia) Phil Dent (semifinals)
5. (United States) Vitas Gerulaitis / (United States) Sandy Mayer (quarterfinals)
6. (Australia) Ross Case / (Australia) Geoff Masters (second round)
7. (United States) Fred McNair / (Mexico) Raúl Ramírez (quarterfinals)
8. (Australia) Ray Ruffels / (Australia) Allan Stone (first round)
9. (United States) Marty Riessen / (United States) Dick Stockton (third round)
10. n/a
11. (Australia) Syd Ball / (Australia) Kim Warwick (third round)
12. (Switzerland) Colin Dowdeswell / (Australia) Chris Kachel (quarterfinals)
13. (South Africa) Ray Moore / (United States) Roscoe Tanner (first round)
14. (United States) Gene Mayer / (United States) Hank Pfister (third round)
15. (Chile) Álvaro Fillol / (Chile) Jaime Fillol (first round)
16. (Australia) John Newcombe / (Australia) Tony Roche (third round)

Click on the seed number of a player to go to their draw section.

== Draw ==
=== Key ===
- Q = Qualifier
- WC = Wild card
- LL = Lucky loser
- Alt = Alternate
- ITF = ITF entry
- PR = Protected ranking
- SR = Special ranking
- SE = Special exempt
- JE = Junior exempt
- JR = Junior Accelerator Programme entrant
- CO = College Accelerator Programme entrant
- NG = Next Gen Accelerator Program entrant
- w/o = Walkover
- r = Retired
- d = Defaulted

=== Finals ===
Quarterfinals
1	(South Africa) Bob Hewitt (South Africa) Frew McMillan	6	8	6	6
5	(United States) Vitas Gerulaitis (United States) Sandy Mayer	4	9	3	3
4	(Australia) John Alexander (Australia) Phil Dent	6	7	6
12	(Switzerland) Colin Dowdeswell (Australia) Chris Kachel	4	5	4
7	(United States) Fred McNair (Mexico) Raúl Ramírez	7	6	8
(United States) Peter Fleming (United States) John McEnroe	9	8	9
(Australia) Mark Edmondson (Australia) John Marks	3	4	6	6	1
2	(Poland) Wojciech Fibak (Netherlands) Tom Okker	6	6	3	4	6

Semifinals
1	(South Africa) Bob Hewitt (South Africa) Frew McMillan	9	7	6
4	(Australia) John Alexander (Australia) Phil Dent	7	5	4
(United States) Peter Fleming (United States) John McEnroe	1	6	9	6
2	(Poland) Wojciech Fibak (Netherlands) Tom Okker	6	3	7	4

Final
1	(South Africa) Bob Hewitt (South Africa) Frew McMillan	6	6	6
(United States) Peter Fleming (United States) John McEnroe	1	4	2

=== Top half ===
==== Section 1 ====
First round
1	(South Africa) R Hewitt (South Africa) F McMillan	9	6	9
(United States) V Amaya (United Kingdom) J Smith	8	3	8
(Sweden) J Norbäck (Sweden) D Palm	6	5	5	1
(Australia) R Carmichael (United States) B Teacher	4	7	7	6
(United Kingdom) C Mottram (United Kingdom) R Taylor	6	6	5	6
(United Kingdom) R Beven (United Kingdom) N Sears	4	4	7	4
(United Kingdom) D Lloyd (United Kingdom) J Lloyd	6	4	4	4
16	(Australia) J Newcombe (Australia) A Roche	3	6	6	6
9	(United States) M Riessen (United States) R Stockton	9	6	6
(New Zealand) R Simpson (United States) V Winitsky	8	2	4
(South Africa) B Mitton (United States) A Pattison	6	8	2	6	12
(United States) A Ashe (France) Y Noah	4	9	6	4	14
(United States) T Leonard (United States) M Machette	6	6	6
Q	(Czechoslovakia) S Birner (Czechoslovakia) J Šimbera	2	1	3
(Australia) S Docherty (Canada) G Halder	7	4	4
5	(United States) V Gerulaitis (United States) A Mayer	9	6	6

Second round
1	(South Africa) R Hewitt (South Africa) F McMillan	9	6	9
(Australia) R Carmichael (United States) B Teacher	8	3	7
(United Kingdom) C Mottram (United Kingdom) R Taylor	2	3	2
16	(Australia) J Newcombe (Australia) A Roche	6	6	6
9	(United States) M Riessen (United States) R Stockton	6	4	5	6	6
(United States) A Ashe (France) Y Noah	2	6	7	3	4
(United States) T Leonard (United States) M Machette	7	4	9	4	4
5	(United States) V Gerulaitis (United States) A Mayer	5	6	7	6	6

Third round
1	(South Africa) R Hewitt (South Africa) F McMillan	7	9	6
16	(Australia) J Newcombe (Australia) A Roche	5	8	4
9	(United States) M Riessen (United States) R Stockton	8	4	2	0
5	(United States) V Gerulaitis (United States) A Mayer	6	6	6	6

Quarterfinals
1	(South Africa) R Hewitt (South Africa) F McMillan	6	8	6	6
5	(United States) V Gerulaitis (United States) A Mayer	4	9	3	3

==== Section 2 ====
First round
4	(Australia) J Alexander (Australia) P Dent	9	4	6	8	6
(United States) J Borowiak (New Zealand) C Lewis	8	6	3	9	3
(Australia) P Campbell (United States) J McManus	2	3	9	3
(United States) J Bailey (United States) R Fisher	6	6	8	6
Q	(Australia) R Giltinan (Australia) J Trickey	6	8	6	4	9
(United States) S Carnahan (United Kingdom) M Wayman	3	9	3	6	7
LL	(Australia) N Callaghan (Australia) V Eke	1	2	4
14	(United States) E Mayer (United States) H Pfister	6	6	6
12	(Switzerland) C Dowdeswell (Australia) C Kachel	6	8	6	6
(Australia) R Kelly (Australia) G Thomson	2	9	1	2
(United Kingdom) J Paish (Republic of Ireland) S Sorensen	9	2	6	3	4
(United States) C Pasarell (United States) E van Dillen	8	6	3	6	6
(Brazil) C Kirmayr (Ecuador) R Ycaza	6	3	5	6
Q	(Australia) D Collings (Australia) K Hancock	2	6	7	8
(United States) Ti Gullikson (United States) To Gullikson	6	6	8
8	(Australia) R Ruffels (Australia) A Stone	3	4	6

Second round
4	(Australia) J Alexander (Australia) P Dent	5	9	6	6
(United States) J Bailey (United States) R Fisher	7	8	3	1
Q	(Australia) R Giltinan (Australia) J Trickey	3	7	9	5	3
14	(United States) E Mayer (United States) H Pfister	6	5	8	7	6
12	(Switzerland) C Dowdeswell (Australia) C Kachel	7	4	6	6	6
(United States) C Pasarell (United States) E van Dillen	5	6	4	8	4
Q	(Australia) D Collings (Australia) K Hancock	3	9	6	6
(United States) Ti Gullikson (United States) To Gullikson	6	8	4	3

Third round
4	(Australia) J Alexander (Australia) P Dent	6	6	6
14	(United States) E Mayer (United States) H Pfister	4	4	2
12	(Switzerland) C Dowdeswell (Australia) C Kachel	7	9	7
Q	(Australia) D Collings (Australia) K Hancock	5	8	5

Quarterfinals
4	(Australia) J Alexander (Australia) P Dent	6	7	6
12	(Switzerland) C Dowdeswell (Australia) C Kachel	4	5	4

=== Bottom half ===
==== Section 3 ====
First round
7	(United States) F McNair (Mexico) R Ramírez	7	6	6
(Argentina) JL Clerc (Chile) B Prajoux	5	4	3
(United States) T Gorman (United States) S Stewart	6	6	6
(Australia) R Crealy (Australia) R Frawley	2	4	2
(United Kingdom) R Drysdale (United Kingdom) R Lewis	9	9	4	9
(Czechoslovakia) J Hřebec (Czechoslovakia) V Zedník	7	8	6	8
(India) A Amritraj (India) V Amritraj	6	9	6
15	(Chile) Á Fillol (Chile) J Fillol	3	7	4
13	(South Africa) R Moore (United States) R Tanner	4	4	8
(Argentina) E Álvarez (Paraguay) V Pecci	6	6	9
(United Kingdom) J Feaver (Australia) J James	8	6	5
(Egypt) I El Shafei (New Zealand) B Fairlie	9	8	7
(Australia) C Fancutt (Australia) P McNamee	1	2	5
(United States) P Fleming (United States) J McEnroe	6	6	7
(United Kingdom) C Bradnam (United Kingdom) A Jarrett	5	5	8
3	(United States) R Lutz (United States) S Smith	7	7	9

Second round
7	(United States) F McNair (Mexico) R Ramírez	7	6	5	6
(United States) T Gorman (United States) S Stewart	5	4	7	2
(United Kingdom) R Drysdale (United Kingdom) R Lewis	1	2	6	9	12
(India) A Amritraj (India) V Amritraj	6	6	3	8	14
(Argentina) E Álvarez (Paraguay) V Pecci	6	6	6
(Egypt) I El Shafei (New Zealand) B Fairlie	4	3	4
(United States) P Fleming (United States) J McEnroe	4	6	6	8	13
(United States) R Lutz (United States) S Smith	6	1	3	9	11

Third round
7	(United States) F McNair (Mexico) R Ramírez	6	6	6
(India) A Amritraj (India) V Amritraj	3	3	4
(Argentina) E Álvarez (Paraguay) V Pecci	2	4	4
(United States) P Fleming (United States) J McEnroe	6	6	6

Quarterfinals
7	(United States) F McNair (Mexico) R Ramírez	7	6	8
(United States) P Fleming (United States) J McEnroe	9	8	9

==== Section 4 ====
First round
6	(Australia) R Case (Australia) G Masters	6	9	6
(United States) D Ralston (Australia) F Stolle	3	8	2
Q	(Australia) B Drewett (Australia) W Maher	2	4	7
(Australia) M Edmondson (Australia) J Marks	6	6	9
(United States) J Hagey (United States) T Wilkison	8	6	6
LL	(Australia) P McNamara (Australia) T Rocavert	6	3	4
LL	(Australia) M Fancutt (Australia) W Hampson	6	6	3	5	7
LL	(Uruguay) JL Damiani (Brazil) C Motta	4	4	6	7	5
11	(Australia) S Ball (Australia) K Warwick	8	6	6
(United States) M Fishbach (United States) P Fishbach	6	2	4
(United Kingdom) M Appleton (United Kingdom) J Dier	7	7	4	4
(Sweden) O Bengtson (United Kingdom) M Cox	5	9	6	6
(United States) W Martin (New Zealand) O Parun	3	4	4
(Australia) C Dibley (Australia) C Letcher	6	6	6
LL	(France) J-B Chanfreau (Australia) S Myers	2	4	1
2	(Poland) W Fibak (Netherlands) T Okker	6	6	6

Second round
6	(Australia) R Case (Australia) G Masters	8	3	9	9	2
(Australia) M Edmondson (Australia) J Marks	9	6	7	8	6
(United States) J Hagey (United States) T Wilkison	6	6	6
LL	(Australia) M Fancutt (Australia) W Hampson	4	2	4
11	(Australia) S Ball (Australia) K Warwick	4	7	6	8	6
(Sweden) O Bengtson (United Kingdom) M Cox	6	5	3	9	3
(Australia) C Dibley (Australia) C Letcher	3	1	4
2	(Poland) W Fibak (Netherlands) T Okker	6	6	6

Third round
(Australia) M Edmondson (Australia) J Marks	6	6	7
(United States) J Hagey (United States) T Wilkison	4	4	5
11	(Australia) S Ball (Australia) K Warwick	3	7	3	6
2	(Poland) W Fibak (Netherlands) T Okker	6	5	6	8

Quarterfinals
(Australia) M Edmondson (Australia) J Marks	3	4	6	6	1
2	(Poland) W Fibak (Netherlands) T Okker	6	6	3	4	6
