= 1979 South Australian Open – Men's doubles =

Men's doubles
- 1979 South Australian Open

Final
- Champions: (Australia) Colin Dibley (Australia) Chris Kachel
- Runners-up: (Australia) John Alexander (Australia) Phil Dent
- Score: 6–7, 7–6, 6–4

Details
- Draw: 16
- Seeds: 4

Events
Singles	Doubles
- South Australian Open

The event was being held for the first time since 1977.

Colin Dibley and Chris Kachel won the title, defeating John Alexander and Phil Dent 6–7, 7–6, 6–4 in the final.

== Seeds ==
1. (Australia) Ross Case / (Australia) Geoff Masters (semifinals)
2. (Australia) Mark Edmondson / (Australia) John Marks (first round)
3. (Australia) John Alexander / (Australia) Phil Dent (final)
4. (Australia) Colin Dibley / (Australia) Chris Kachel (champions)

== Draw ==
Key

- Q = Qualifier
- WC = Wild card
- LL = Lucky loser
- Alt = Alternate
- ITF = ITF entry
- PR = Protected ranking
- SR = Special ranking
- SE = Special exempt
- JE = Junior exempt
- JR = Junior Accelerator Programme entrant
- CO = College Accelerator Programme entrant
- NG = Next Gen Accelerator Program entrant
- w/o = Walkover
- r = Retired
- d = Defaulted

=== Draw ===
First round
1	(Australia) R Case (Australia) G Masters	7	3	6
(United States) Christofer Delaney (United States) J Delaney	6	6	3
(United States) S Krulevitz (United States) M Mitchell	6	4
(United States) F McNair (United States) T Wilkison	7	6
3	(Australia) J Alexander (Australia) P Dent	6	7
Q	(Australia) Trevor Reeves (Australia) James Ferguson	4	6
(Australia) V Eke (West Germany) Thomas Furst	2	2
(South Africa) B Mitton (South Africa) R Moore	6	6
(Australia) J James (Australia) T Rocavert	7	6
(Austria) Kurt Lechner (Austria) Roland Steigler	5	2
(United Kingdom) J Smith (Australia) K Warwick	3	2
4	(Australia) C Dibley (Australia) C Kachel	6	6
(Australia) D Collings (Australia) D Crealy	7	7
(Australia) C Letcher (Australia) W Maher	6	5
(Australia) J Fitzgerald (Australia) W Pascoe	6	6
2	(Australia) M Edmondson (Australia) J Marks	2	4

Quarterfinals
1	(Australia) R Case (Australia) G Masters	6	6
(United States) F McNair (United States) T Wilkison	3	3
3	(Australia) J Alexander (Australia) P Dent	7	4	6
(South Africa) B Mitton (South Africa) R Moore	5	6	4
(Australia) J James (Australia) T Rocavert	4	4
4	(Australia) C Dibley (Australia) C Kachel	6	6
(Australia) D Collings (Australia) D Crealy	7	6	8
(Australia) J Fitzgerald (Australia) W Pascoe	6	7	6

Semifinals
1	(Australia) R Case (Australia) G Masters	5	3
3	(Australia) J Alexander (Australia) P Dent	7	6
4	(Australia) C Dibley (Australia) C Kachel	6	6
(Australia) D Collings (Australia) D Crealy	3	2

Final
3	(Australia) J Alexander (Australia) P Dent	7	6	4
4	(Australia) C Dibley (Australia) C Kachel	6	7	6
