= 1978 Wimbledon Championships – Men's singles =

Men's singles
- 1978 Wimbledon Championships

Final
- Champion: (Sweden) Björn Borg
- Runner-up: (United States) Jimmy Connors
- Score: 6–2, 6–2, 6–3

Details
- Draw: 128 (16 Q / 8 WC )
- Seeds: 16

Events
Singles	men	women		boys	girls
Doubles	men	women	mixed	boys	girls
← 1977 ·	Wimbledon Championships	· 1979 →

Two-time defending champion Björn Borg defeated Jimmy Connors in a rematch of the previous year's final, 6–2, 6–2, 6–3 to win the gentlemen's singles tennis title at the 1978 Wimbledon Championships. It was his third Wimbledon title and sixth major title overall.

Having won the 1978 French Open title the previous month, Borg’s Wimbledon crown made him the second man, after Rocket Rod Laver in 1969, in the Open Era to complete the Channel Slam at 22 years, 32 days old. He would hold the record for the youngest man to complete the Channel Slam until Carlos Alcaraz became the 6th man of this exclusive club at just 21 years, 70 days old.

== Seeds ==
1. (Sweden) Björn Borg (champion)
2. (United States) Jimmy Connors (final)
3. (United States) Vitas Gerulaitis (semifinals)
4. (Argentina) Guillermo Vilas (third round)
5. (United States) Brian Gottfried (quarterfinals)
6. (United States) Roscoe Tanner (fourth round)
7. (Mexico) Raúl Ramírez (quarterfinals)
8. (United States) Sandy Mayer (quarterfinals)
9. (Romania) Ilie Năstase (quarterfinals)
10. (United States) Dick Stockton (first round)
11. (United States) John McEnroe (first round)
12. (United Kingdom) Buster Mottram (second round)
13. (Poland) Wojciech Fibak (fourth round)
14. (Australia) John Alexander (fourth round)
15. (United States) Arthur Ashe (first round)
16. (Australia) John Newcombe (fourth round)

Click on the seed number of a player to go to their draw section.

== Draw ==
=== Key ===
- Q = Qualifier
- WC = Wild card
- LL = Lucky loser
- Alt = Alternate
- ITF = ITF entry
- PR = Protected ranking
- SR = Special ranking
- SE = Special exempt
- JE = Junior exempt
- JR = Junior Accelerator Programme entrant
- CO = College Accelerator Programme entrant
- NG = Next Gen Accelerator Program entrant
- w/o = Walkover
- r = Retired
- d = Defaulted

=== Finals ===
Quarterfinals
1	(Sweden) Björn Borg	7	6	6
8	(United States) Sandy Mayer	5	4	3
(Netherlands) Tom Okker	7	6	2	6
9	(Romania) Ilie Năstase	5	1	6	3
5	(United States) Brian Gottfried	5	6	7	2
3	(United States) Vitas Gerulaitis	7	4	9	6
7	(Mexico) Raúl Ramírez	4	4	2
2	(United States) Jimmy Connors	6	6	6

Semifinals
1	(Sweden) Björn Borg	6	6	6
(Netherlands) Tom Okker	4	4	4
3	(United States) Vitas Gerulaitis	7	2	1
2	(United States) Jimmy Connors	9	6	6

Final
1	(Sweden) Björn Borg	6	6	6
2	(United States) Jimmy Connors	2	2	3

=== Top half ===
==== Section 1 ====
First round
1	(Sweden) Björn Borg	8	6	1	6	6
(United States) Victor Amaya	9	1	6	3	3
(France) Christophe Roger-Vasselin	6	3	7	3
(Australia) Peter McNamara	8	6	5	6
(Chile) Jaime Fillol	6	6	2
(Czechoslovakia) Jan Kodeš	2	1	0^{r}
(United Kingdom) Robin Drysdale	2	2	6	6	6
(Czechoslovakia) Jiří Hřebec	6	6	4	3	2
(Sweden) Ove Bengtson	6	6	7
WC	(Australia) Fred Stolle	4	4	5
(United States) Bill Scanlon	5	8	3	2
(Australia) Geoff Masters	7	6	6	6
(South Africa) Frew McMillan	6	6	6
(United States) Rick Fagel	1	1	2
LL	(Sweden) Douglas Palm	5	2	2
12	(United Kingdom) Buster Mottram	7	6	6

Second round
1	(Sweden) B Borg	6	6	6
(Australia) P McNamara	2	2	4
(Chile) J Fillol	6	6	6
(United Kingdom) R Drysdale	3	3	2
(Sweden) O Bengtson	0	8	8	4
(Australia) G Masters	6	6	9	6
(South Africa) F McMillan	9	6	6
12	(United Kingdom) C Mottram	8	4	3

Third round
1	(Sweden) B Borg	6	6	6	6
(Chile) J Fillol	4	2	8	4
(Australia) G Masters	6	7	6
(South Africa) F McMillan	3	5	1

Fourth round
1	(Sweden) B Borg	6	6	8
(Australia) G Masters	2	4	6

==== Section 2 ====
First round
13	(Poland) Wojciech Fibak	6	7	7
(Argentina) José Luis Clerc	3	5	5
Q	(South Africa) Johan Kriek	6	7	6
(United States) Tim Wilkison	4	5	3
WC	(United Kingdom) John Paish	3	4	2
(Australia) Ray Ruffels	6	6	6
(Mexico) Marcelo Lara	2	4	8
(United States) Terry Moor	6	6	9
(United States) Van Winitsky	6	6	4	6
LL	(United States) Bruce Manson	1	3	6	3
(United States) Mike Fishbach	1	2	2
(United States) Marty Riessen	6	6	6
Q	(Australia) Mark Edmondson	3	2	6	6	6
(South Africa) Ray Moore	6	6	4	2	4
(Czechoslovakia) Tomáš Šmid	5	4	3
8	(United States) Sandy Mayer	7	6	6

Second round
13	(Poland) W Fibak	8	4	6	6
Q	(South Africa) J Kriek	6	6	2	4
(Australia) R Ruffels	5	5	8
(United States) T Moor	7	7	9
(United States) V Winitsky	3	2	6	7
(United States) M Riessen	6	6	4	9
Q	(Australia) M Edmondson	4	2	6	2
8	(United States) A Mayer	6	6	4	6

Third round
13	(Poland) W Fibak	6	4	7	9
(United States) T Moor	1	6	5	7
(United States) M Riessen	6	5	3
8	(United States) A Mayer	8	7	6

Fourth round
13	(Poland) W Fibak	4	2	8	6	5
8	(United States) A Mayer	6	6	6	1	7

==== Section 3 ====
First round
4	(Argentina) Guillermo Vilas	6	6	6
(United States) Stan Smith	4	3	3
WC	(United Kingdom) John Feaver	6	6	6
Q	(United States) Joel Bailey	4	4	4
(New Zealand) Onny Parun	8	3	3	2
(Netherlands) Tom Okker	6	6	6	6
(France) Yannick Noah	8	3	6	6	10
(Ecuador) Ricardo Ycaza	9	6	2	1	8
(Italy) Antonio Zugarelli	7	4	2	9	6
Q	(Australia) Chris Kachel	5	6	6	8	1
(Australia) Paul McNamee	3	4	3
(United States) Tom Leonard	6	6	6
(United States) Steve Krulevitz	3	3	5
(New Zealand) Brian Fairlie	6	6	7
(Australia) Steve Docherty	8	9	6	5	7
15	(United States) Arthur Ashe	9	8	3	7	5

Second round
4	(Argentina) G Vilas	6	2	6	6
WC	(United Kingdom) J Feaver	3	6	4	3
(Netherlands) T Okker	6	6	6
(France) Y Noah	2	3	2
(Italy) A Zugarelli	2	4	8
(United States) T Leonard	6	6	9
(New Zealand) B Fairlie	6	6	6
(Australia) S Docherty	3	4	3

Third round
4	(Argentina) G Vilas	3	4	2
(Netherlands) T Okker	6	6	6
(United States) T Leonard	6	4	8	6
(New Zealand) B Fairlie	2	6	6	3

Fourth round
(Netherlands) T Okker	6	9	6
(United States) T Leonard	1	8	1

==== Section 4 ====
First round
9	(Romania) Ilie Năstase	6	6	5	6
(South Africa) John Yuill	2	2	7	3
LL	(Czechoslovakia) Stanislav Birner	3	6	4	6
(Italy) Gianni Ocleppo	6	4	6	8
(Czechoslovakia) Vladimír Zedník	7	6	3	3
LL	(United States) Mike Machette	9	4	6	6
Q	(Australia) Bob Carmichael	3	4	6
(United States) Tom Gullikson	6	6	8
(Czechoslovakia) Jiří Granát	8	8	4
(United States) Peter Fleming	9	9	6
(Australia) Cliff Letcher	3	5	4
Q	(United States) Fred McNair	6	7	6
(Australia) Bob Giltinan	6	6	9
WC	(United Kingdom) David Lloyd	2	1	8
(Egypt) Ismail El Shafei	9	6	2	7	2
6	(United States) Roscoe Tanner	8	1	6	9	6

Second round
9	(Romania) I Năstase	6	6	9
(Italy) G Ocleppo	3	4	7
LL	(United States) M Machette	4	4	2
(United States) To Gullikson	6	6	6
(United States) P Fleming	8	8	6	6	3
Q	(United States) F McNair	9	6	4	8	6
(Australia) R Giltinan	2	2	4
6	(United States) R Tanner	6	6	6

Third round
9	(Romania) I Năstase	6	6	1	6
(United States) To Gullikson	4	3	6	3
Q	(United States) F McNair	4	2	2
6	(United States) R Tanner	6	6	6

Fourth round
9	(Romania) I Năstase	2	6	6	6
6	(United States) R Tanner	6	4	2	3

=== Bottom half ===
==== Section 5 ====
First round
5	(United States) Brian Gottfried	6	6	8	6
(United Kingdom) John Lloyd	1	8	6	4
(United States) Brian Teacher	6	6	3	6
(United States) Bob Lutz	4	4	6	1
(Australia) Terry Rocavert	1	4	4
(Australia) Allan Stone	6	6	6
Q	(United Kingdom) Mark Farrell	1	7	1	4
(South Africa) Bernard Mitton	6	5	6	6
Q	(Czechoslovakia) Jan Šimbera	7	8	3	6
WC	(United Kingdom) Andrew Jarrett	5	6	6	3
(Rhodesia) Andrew Pattison	4	6	1	0
(United States) Tim Gullikson	6	3	6	6
(United States) Billy Martin	5	6	6	6
(United States) Jeff Borowiak	7	4	4	4
Q	(United States) Erik van Dillen	7	1	8	6	6
11	(United States) John McEnroe	5	6	9	4	3

Second round
5	(United States) B Gottfried	6	7	6
(United States) B Teacher	2	5	3
(Australia) A Stone	6	2	6	6	10
(South Africa) B Mitton	1	6	8	1	8
Q	(Czechoslovakia) J Šimbera	2	3	4
(United States) Ti Gullikson	6	6	6
(United States) W Martin	5	7	6	6	7
Q	(United States) E van Dillen	7	5	8	4	5

Third round
5	(United States) B Gottfried	6	9	6	6
(Australia) A Stone	8	7	2	1
(United States) Ti Gullikson	6	9	7
(United States) W Martin	3	7	5

Fourth round
5	(United States) B Gottfried	6	6	6
(United States) Ti Gullikson	2	4	2

==== Section 6 ====
First round
10	(United States) Dick Stockton	2	8	5
Q	(Australia) John Marks	6	9	7
(United States) Nick Saviano	6	6	3	6
WC	(United Kingdom) Chris Bradnam	4	2	6	1
(United States) Hank Pfister	6	6	6
Q	(Chile) Álvaro Fillol	1	1	2
LL	(Australia) David Carter	8	6	9
(United Kingdom) Richard Lewis	6	4	8
Q	(United Kingdom) Michael Wayman	4	8	3
(United States) Sherwood Stewart	6	9	6
(United States) Rick Fisher	6	6	6
(France) Jean-François Caujolle	3	3	1
Q	(India) Jayakumar Royappa	2	6	6	6
(Canada) Greg Halder	6	3	2	2
(Switzerland) Heinz Günthardt	2	2	6	1
3	(United States) Vitas Gerulaitis	6	6	4	6

Second round
Q	(Australia) J Marks	3	2	3
(United States) N Saviano	6	6	6
(United States) H Pfister	6	6	9
LL	(Australia) D Carter	3	4	8
(United States) S Stewart	6	9	9
(United States) R Fisher	4	7	7
Q	(India) J Royappa	3	5	2
3	(United States) V Gerulaitis	6	7	6

Third round
(United States) N Saviano	7	9	2	2
(United States) H Pfister	9	8	6	6
(United States) S Stewart	8	0	2
3	(United States) V Gerulaitis	9	6	6

Fourth round
(United States) H Pfister	3	6	2	3
3	(United States) V Gerulaitis	6	3	6	6

==== Section 7 ====
First round
7	(Mexico) Raúl Ramírez	9	9	6
(Australia) Colin Dibley	7	8	3
(Australia) Dick Crealy	2	4	8
Q	(South Africa) David Schneider	6	6	9
(Romania) Ion Țiriac	6	3	4	4
Q	(Australia) Rod Frawley	3	6	6	6
(France) Éric Deblicker	6	8	6	3	6
(Netherlands) Louk Sanders	2	9	3	6	3
(Australia) Phil Dent	6	7	4	4	7
(Australia) Tony Roche	4	5	6	6	5
(India) Vijay Amritraj	6	6	9
(Brazil) Carlos Alberto Kirmayr	1	3	8
(Australia) Ross Case	7	4	7	6	6
(Chile) Belus Prajoux	5	6	9	1	4
Q	(Australia) Dale Collings	6	5	5	3
16	(Australia) John Newcombe	4	7	7	6

Second round
7	(Mexico) R Ramírez	6	6	6
Q	(South Africa) D Schneider	1	0	2
Q	(Australia) R Frawley	7	6	6	6
(France) É Deblicker	9	0	0	3
(Australia) P Dent	3	6	6	4	7
(India) V Amritraj	6	3	3	6	5
(Australia) R Case	4	2	8
16	(Australia) J Newcombe	6	6	9

Third round
7	(Mexico) R Ramírez	6	7	6
Q	(Australia) R Frawley	4	5	3
(Australia) P Dent	1	6	4	4
16	(Australia) J Newcombe	6	1	6	6

Fourth round
7	(Mexico) R Ramírez	6	9	6
16	(Australia) J Newcombe	2	8	3

==== Section 8 ====
First round
14	(Australia) John Alexander	7	4	9	8	12
(Paraguay) Víctor Pecci	5	6	8	9	10
WC	(United Kingdom) Jonathan Smith	3	0	4
(India) Anand Amritraj	6	6	6
(United States) George Hardie	6	7	4	3	2
WC	(South Africa) Bob Hewitt	3	5	6	6	6
(Switzerland) Colin Dowdeswell	5	6	6	4	6
(United Kingdom) Roger Taylor	7	3	4	6	2
(New Zealand) Chris Lewis	6	2	6	5	3
(United States) Tom Gorman	0	6	4	7	6
(United Kingdom) Mark Cox	6	3	6	6
(Australia) John James	4	6	4	4
(Australia) Kim Warwick	7	0	6	2	6
(United States) Gene Mayer	5	6	0	6	4
(New Zealand) Russell Simpson	5	8	1
2	(United States) Jimmy Connors	7	9	6

Second round
14	(Australia) J Alexander	5	6	7	6
(India) A Amritraj	7	3	5	2
WC	(South Africa) R Hewitt	6	4	6	6
(Switzerland) C Dowdeswell	4	6	2	4
(United States) T Gorman	4	8	8	7
(United Kingdom) M Cox	6	6	6	5
(Australia) K Warwick	3	5	6	4
2	(United States) J Connors	6	7	2	6

Third round
14	(Australia) J Alexander	8	0
WC	(South Africa) R Hewitt	6	0^{r}
(United States) T Gorman	4	6	9	3
2	(United States) J Connors	6	8	8	6

Fourth round
14	(Australia) J Alexander	2	2	4
2	(United States) J Connors	6	6	6

Preceded by 1978 French Open	Grand Slams; Men's singles	Succeeded by 1978 U.S. Open
