= 1978 Wimbledon Championships – Mixed doubles =

Mixed doubles
- 1978 Wimbledon Championships

Final
- Champions: (South Africa) Frew McMillan (Netherlands) Betty Stöve
- Runners-up: (Australia) Ray Ruffels (United States) Billie Jean King
- Score: 6–2, 6–2

Details
- Draw: 52 (4 Q )
- Seeds: 8

Events
Singles	men	women		boys	girls
Doubles	men	women	mixed	boys	girls
← 1977 ·	Wimbledon Championships	· 1979 →

Bob Hewitt and Greer Stevens were the defending champions but did not compete.

Frew McMillan and Betty Stöve defeated Ray Ruffels and Billie Jean King in the final, 6–2, 6–2 to win the mixed doubles tennis title at the 1978 Wimbledon Championships.

== Seeds ==
1. (South Africa) Frew McMillan / (Netherlands) Betty Stöve (champions)
2. (Australia) Ray Ruffels / (United States) Billie Jean King (final)
3. (Australia) Geoff Masters / (United Kingdom) Virginia Wade (third round)
4. (Australia) Tony Roche / (France) Françoise Dürr (semifinals)
5. (United States) Marty Riessen / (Australia) Wendy Turnbull (third round)
6. (Australia) Ross Case / (United States) Mona Guerrant (second round)
7. (United States) Raz Reid / (Australia) Kerry Reid (second round)
8. (United States) Fred McNair / (Australia) Lesley Hunt (third round)

Click on the seed number of a player to go to their draw section.

== Draw ==
=== Key ===
- Q = Qualifier
- WC = Wild card
- LL = Lucky loser
- Alt = Alternate
- SE = Special exempt
- PR = Protected ranking
- ITF = ITF entry
- JE = Junior exempt
- w/o = Walkover
- r = Retired
- d = Defaulted
- SR = Special ranking

=== Finals ===
Quarterfinals
1	(South Africa) Frew McMillan (Netherlands) Betty Stöve	4	7	6
(United Kingdom) Andrew Jarrett (United Kingdom) Debbie Jevans	6	5	3
4	(Australia) Tony Roche (France) Françoise Dürr	6	6
(United States) Dennis Ralston (United States) JoAnne Russell	1	2
(Australia) Chris Kachel (South Africa) Ilana Kloss	6	3	4
(Australia) Allan Stone (Australia) Dianne Fromholtz	3	6	6
(United Kingdom) David Lloyd (United Kingdom) Lesley Charles	4	2
2	(Australia) Ray Ruffels (United States) Billie Jean King	6	6

Semifinals
1	(South Africa) Frew McMillan (Netherlands) Betty Stöve	7	6
4	(Australia) Tony Roche (France) Françoise Dürr	5	3
(Australia) Allan Stone (Australia) Dianne Fromholtz	6	6
2	(Australia) Ray Ruffels (United States) Billie Jean King	3	4

Final
1	(South Africa) Frew McMillan (Netherlands) Betty Stöve	6	6
2	(Australia) Ray Ruffels (United States) Billie Jean King	2	2

=== Top half ===
==== Section 1 ====
First round
(Australia) J Marks (Czechoslovakia) R Tomanová	6	7
LL	(Australia) K Hancock (Australia) W Paish	3	5
(United Kingdom) C Bradnam (United Kingdom) J Durie	6	5
(United Kingdom) J Paish (United Kingdom) L Mottram	8	7
(United Kingdom) A Jarrett (United Kingdom) D Jevans	4	6	8
(Australia) D Collings (New Zealand) S Chapman	6	3	6
(Australia) S Ball (United Kingdom) S Barker	4	6	2
5	(United States) M Riessen (Australia) W Turnbull	6	3	6

Second round
1	(South Africa) F McMillan (Netherlands) B Stöve	6	6
(Australia) J Marks (Czechoslovakia) R Tomanová	1	4
LL	(United States) S Carnahan (United States) D Desfor
(United Kingdom) J Paish (United Kingdom) L Mottram	w/o
(Chile) B Prajoux (Argentina) R Giscafré	2	1
(United Kingdom) A Jarrett (United Kingdom) D Jevans	6	6
(West Germany) W Bungert (United Kingdom) M Tyler	1	4
5	(United States) M Riessen (Australia) W Turnbull	6	6

Third round
1	(South Africa) F McMillan (Netherlands) B Stöve	6	6
(United Kingdom) J Paish (United Kingdom) L Mottram	4	1
(United Kingdom) A Jarrett (United Kingdom) D Jevans	3	6	7
5	(United States) M Riessen (Australia) W Turnbull	6	1	5

Quarterfinals
1	(South Africa) F McMillan (Netherlands) B Stöve	4	7	6
(United Kingdom) A Jarrett (United Kingdom) D Jevans	6	5	3

==== Section 2 ====
First round
4	(Australia) A Roche (France) F Dürr	w/o
LL	(United States) V Van Patten (United States) S Hagey
(United Kingdom) R Lewis (United Kingdom) V Burton	w/o
(Australia) C Dibley (Australia) L Bowrey
(Australia) J James (Chile) S Urroz	4	4
Q	(Australia) W Maher (Australia) J Harrison	6	4^{r}
(Australia) M Edmondson (Australia) P Whytcross	6	6
(United Kingdom) R Beven (United Kingdom) A Hobbs	1	3
(United States) V Amaya (United States) C Meyer	4	9	2
(United States) D Ralston (United States) J Russell	6	8	6
(United Kingdom) R Drysdale (United States) P Bostrom	3	7	1
8	(United States) F McNair (Australia) L Hunt	6	5	6

Second round
4	(Australia) A Roche (France) F Dürr	w/o
(United Kingdom) R Lewis (United Kingdom) V Burton
(Australia) R Carmichael (Australia) J Dalton	4	3
(Australia) J James (Chile) S Urroz	6	6
(Australia) M Edmondson (Australia) P Whytcross	3	3
(United States) D Ralston (United States) J Russell	6	6
(Australia) P McNamee (Australia) K Ruddell
8	(United States) F McNair (Australia) L Hunt	w/o

Third round
4	(Australia) A Roche (France) F Dürr	6	6
(Australia) J James (Chile) S Urroz	3	1
(United States) D Ralston (United States) J Russell	6	7
8	(United States) F McNair (Australia) L Hunt	3	5

Quarterfinals
4	(Australia) A Roche (France) F Dürr	6	6
(United States) D Ralston (United States) J Russell	1	2

=== Bottom half ===
==== Section 3 ====
First round
7	(United States) G Reid (Australia) K Reid	6	6
Q	(South Africa) G Grisillo (United States) R Blount	2	0
(Australia) P Dent (Australia) A Tobin	3	2
(United States) B Teacher (United States) K May	6	6
LL	(United Kingdom) A Lloyd (United Kingdom) R Lewis	2	2
(United States) J McEnroe (United States) S Margolin	6	6
(United Kingdom) J Smith (United Kingdom) L Beaven	6	0	2
(Australia) A Stone (Australia) D Fromholtz	4	6	6
(South Africa) J Yuill (United States) S Tolleson
LL	(United Kingdom) N Rayner (United Kingdom) C Harrison	w/o
(United States) M Machette (United States) S Walsh	9	6
Q	(United States) S Vuille (United States) H Ludloff	8	4

Second round
7	(United States) G Reid (Australia) K Reid	6	6	1
(United States) B Teacher (United States) K May	3	8	6
(Australia) C Kachel (South Africa) I Kloss	8	7	9
(United States) J McEnroe (United States) S Margolin	9	5	7
(Australia) A Stone (Australia) D Fromholtz	6	6
LL	(United Kingdom) N Rayner (United Kingdom) C Harrison	3	2
(United States) M Machette (United States) S Walsh
3	(Australia) G Masters (United Kingdom) V Wade	w/o

Third round
(United States) B Teacher (United States) K May	3	5
(Australia) C Kachel (South Africa) I Kloss	6	7
(Australia) A Stone (Australia) D Fromholtz	6	5	6
3	(Australia) G Masters (United Kingdom) V Wade	4	7	4

Quarterfinals
(Australia) C Kachel (South Africa) I Kloss	6	3	4
(Australia) A Stone (Australia) D Fromholtz	3	6	6

==== Section 4 ====
First round
(New Zealand) C Lewis (Sweden) H Anliot	1	4
(United States) J Austin (United States) T Austin	6	6
(Paraguay) V Pecci (United States) P Teeguarden	3	5
(Australia) P McNamara (Australia) D Evers	6	7
(Australia) F Stolle (United States) J Anthony	3	6	4
(Australia) K Warwick (Socialist Federal Republic of Yugoslavia) M Jaušovec	6	3	6
Q	(United States) R Verdieck (United States) S Acker	8	2
(United Kingdom) J Feaver (United Kingdom) A Coe	9	6

Second round
6	(Australia) R Case (United States) M Guerrant	4	3
(United States) J Austin (United States) T Austin	6	6
(Australia) P McNamara (Australia) D Evers	4	4
(United Kingdom) D Lloyd (United Kingdom) L Charles	6	6
(Australia) K Warwick (Socialist Federal Republic of Yugoslavia) M Jaušovec	6	6
(Switzerland) H Günthardt (Czechoslovakia) R Maršíková	4	4
(United Kingdom) J Feaver (United Kingdom) A Coe	1	3
2	(Australia) R Ruffels (United States) BJ King	6	6

Third round
(United States) J Austin (United States) T Austin	3	4
(United Kingdom) D Lloyd (United Kingdom) L Charles	6	6
(Australia) K Warwick (Socialist Federal Republic of Yugoslavia) M Jaušovec
2	(Australia) R Ruffels (United States) BJ King	w/o

Quarterfinals
(United Kingdom) D Lloyd (United Kingdom) L Charles	4	2
2	(Australia) R Ruffels (United States) BJ King	6	6
