= 1979 South Australian Open – Men's singles =

Men's singles
- 1979 South Australian Open

Final
- Champion: (Australia) Kim Warwick
- Runner-up: (South Africa) Bernard Mitton
- Score: 7–5, 6–4

Details
- Draw: 32
- Seeds: 4

Events
Singles	Doubles
- South Australian Open

Third-seeded Kim Warwick won the singles title at the 1979 South Australian Open tennis tournament, defeating unseeded Bernard Mitton 7–5, 6–4 in the final. Due to a rain delay the final was shortened from best-of-five to best-of-three sets.

== Seeds ==
1. (United States) Gene Mayer (second round)
2. (Australia) John Alexander (semifinals)
3. (Australia) Kim Warwick (champion)
4. (United States) Tim Wilkison (first round)

== Draw ==
Key

- Q = Qualifier
- WC = Wild card
- LL = Lucky loser
- Alt = Alternate
- ITF = ITF entry
- PR = Protected ranking
- SR = Special ranking
- SE = Special exempt
- JE = Junior exempt
- JR = Junior Accelerator Programme entrant
- CO = College Accelerator Programme entrant
- NG = Next Gen Accelerator Program entrant
- w/o = Walkover
- r = Retired
- d = Defaulted

=== Finals ===
Semifinals
(South Africa) Bernard Mitton	4	6	6
(Australia) Tony Roche	6	2	1
3	(Australia) Kim Warwick	2	6	6
2	(Australia) John Alexander	6	3	4

Final
(South Africa) Bernard Mitton	5	4
3	(Australia) Kim Warwick	7	6

=== Top half ===
First round
1	(United States) G Mayer	6	6
(Australia) C Letcher	4	3
(Australia) D Collings	6	6
(Australia) J Fitzgerald	3	4
(Australia) G Whitecross	7	7
(South Africa) D Schneider	6	6
(South Africa) B Mitton	7	4	6
(Australia) D Crealy	6	6	1
4	(United States) T Wilkison	3	2
(Australia) W Maher	6	6
(Australia) T Roche	7	6
(Australia) B Drewett	5	4
(Australia) T Rocavert	6	6
(New Zealand) C Gunning	3	2
(United States) S Krulevitz	6	1
(Australia) G Masters	7	6

Second round
1	(United States) G Mayer	7	2	r
(Australia) D Collings	6	3
(Australia) G Whitecross	4	2
(South Africa) B Mitton	6	6
(Australia) W Maher	4	2
(Australia) T Roche	6	6
(Australia) T Rocavert	5	3
(Australia) G Masters	7	6

Quarterfinals
(Australia) D Collings	4	4
(South Africa) B Mitton	6	6
(Australia) T Roche	6	7
(Australia) G Masters	4	5

Semifinals
(South Africa) B Mitton	4	6	6
(Australia) T Roche	6	2	1

=== Bottom half ===
First round
(Australia) C Dibley	6	6
(Australia) P Dent	3	4
(United States) C Delaney	6	7
(South Africa) R Moore	2	6
(United States) J Delaney	3	6	6
(Australia) J James	6	4	1
(Australia) P Campbell	2	4
3	(Australia) K Warwick	6	6
(United States) D Stockton	5	2
(Australia) J Marks	7	6
(United States) M Mitchell	6	6
(Australia) V Eke	3	1
(Australia) B Guan	6	7
(United States) F McNair	1	5
(Australia) C Kachel	5	6	3
2	(Australia) J Alexander	7	4	6

Second round
(Australia) C Dibley	4	4
(United States) C Delaney	6	6
(United States) J Delaney	1	3
3	(Australia) K Warwick	6	6
(Australia) J Marks	5	4
(United States) M Mitchell	7	6
(Australia) B Guan	3	4
2	(Australia) J Alexander	6	6

Quarterfinals
(United States) C Delaney	6	3
3	(Australia) K Warwick	7	6
(United States) M Mitchell	7	6	3
2	(Australia) J Alexander	6	7	6

Semifinals
3	(Australia) K Warwick	2	6	6
2	(Australia) J Alexander	6	3	4
