= 1978 Wimbledon Championships – Women's singles =

Women's singles
- 1978 Wimbledon Championships

Final
- Champion: (United States) Martina Navratilova
- Runner-up: (United States) Chris Evert
- Score: 2–6, 6–4, 7–5

Details
- Draw: 96 (8 Q / 6 WC )
- Seeds: 16

Events
Singles	men	women		boys	girls
Doubles	men	women	mixed	boys	girls
← 1977 ·	Wimbledon Championships	· 1979 →

Martina Navratilova defeated Chris Evert in the final, 2–6, 6–4, 7–5 to win the ladies' singles tennis title at the 1978 Wimbledon Championships. It was her first major singles title, and the first of an eventual 18 major singles titles and a record nine Wimbledon singles titles.

Virginia Wade was the defending champion, but was defeated in the semifinals by Evert.

This was the first time Wimbledon seeded 16 players for the ladies' championship, increasing the number from 12 the previous year. This remained the seeding system until 2001, when the tournament began to have 32 seeds.

== Seeds ==
1. (United States) Chris Evert (final)
2. (United States) Martina Navratilova (champion)
3. (Australia) Evonne Goolagong Cawley (semifinals)
4. (United Kingdom) Virginia Wade (semifinals)
5. (United States) Billie Jean King (quarterfinals)
6. (Netherlands) Betty Stöve (fourth round)
7. (Australia) Wendy Turnbull (fourth round)
8. (Australia) Dianne Fromholtz (fourth round)
9. (United States) Tracy Austin (fourth round)
10. (Australia) Kerry Reid (fourth round)
11. (South Africa) Marise Kruger (quarterfinals)
12. (Socialist Federal Republic of Yugoslavia) Mima Jaušovec (quarterfinals)
13. (Romania) Virginia Ruzici (quarterfinals)
14. (United Kingdom) Sue Barker (fourth round)
15. (Czechoslovakia) Regina Maršíková (fourth round)
16. (United States) Marita Redondo (third round)

Click on the seed number of a player to go to their draw section.

As originally published Rosie Casals was seeded 14th and Sue Barker was seeded 16th. The withdrawal of Casals before the draw was made allowed for a redrafting of the seeding list.

== Draw ==
=== Key ===
- Q = Qualifier
- WC = Wild card
- LL = Lucky loser
- Alt = Alternate
- ITF = ITF entry
- PR = Protected ranking
- SR = Special ranking
- SE = Special exempt
- JE = Junior exempt
- JR = Junior Accelerator Programme entrant
- CO = College Accelerator Programme entrant
- NG = Next Gen Accelerator Program entrant
- w/o = Walkover
- r = Retired
- d = Defaulted

=== Finals ===
Quarterfinals
1	(United States) Chris Evert	6	3	6
5	(United States) Billie Jean King	3	6	2
4	(United Kingdom) Virginia Wade	6	6
12	(Socialist Federal Republic of Yugoslavia) Mima Jaušovec	0	4
13	(Romania) Virginia Ruzici	5	3
3	(Australia) Evonne Goolagong Cawley	7	6
11	(South Africa) Marise Kruger	2	4
2	(United States) Martina Navratilova	6	6

Semifinals
1	(United States) Chris Evert	8	6
4	(United Kingdom) Virginia Wade	6	2
3	(Australia) Evonne Goolagong Cawley	6	4	4
2	(United States) Martina Navratilova	2	6	6

Final
1	(United States) Chris Evert	6	4	5
2	(United States) Martina Navratilova	2	6	7

=== Top half ===
==== Section 1 ====
First round
(France) F Thibault	4	2
(Sweden) H Anliot	6	6
(United States) S McInerney	7	4
Q	(New Zealand) J Chaloner	9	6
(United Kingdom) G Coles	3	4
(Denmark) H Sparre-Viragh	6	6
(United States) L Antonoplis	2	4
10	(Australia) K Reid	6	6

Second round
1	(United States) C Evert	6	6
(Sweden) H Anliot	1	0
(United States) L duPont	6	6
Q	(New Zealand) J Chaloner	2	0
(Denmark) H Sparre-Viragh	4	6	6
(West Germany) I Riedel	6	2	1
(Romania) M Simionescu	1	0
10	(Australia) K Reid	6	6

Third round
1	(United States) C Evert	6	4	6
(United States) L duPont	1	6	0
(Denmark) H Sparre-Viragh	0	4
10	(Australia) K Reid	6	6

Fourth round
1	(United States) C Evert	6	6
10	(Australia) K Reid	3	4

==== Section 2 ====
First round
14	(United Kingdom) S Barker	6	6
(United States) A Kiyomura	4	1
(Sweden) M Wikstedt	3	3
(United States) P Shriver	6	6
WC	(United Kingdom) L Mottram	1	4
(Czechoslovakia) R Tomanová	6	6
Q	(Belgium) M Gurdal	0	2
5	(United States) BJ King	6	6

Second round
14	(United Kingdom) S Barker	6	6
(South Africa) T Harford	1	3
(United States) R Harris	0	0
(United States) P Shriver	6	6
(Czechoslovakia) R Tomanová	5	6	6
(Australia) D Evers	7	3	2
Q	(Hungary) M Pinterová	3	2
5	(United States) BJ King	6	6

Third round
14	(United Kingdom) S Barker	2	8	7
(United States) P Shriver	6	6	5
(Czechoslovakia) R Tomanová	6	3	3
5	(United States) BJ King	4	6	6

Fourth round
14	(United Kingdom) S Barker	2	2
5	(United States) BJ King	6	6

==== Section 3 ====
First round
4	(United Kingdom) V Wade	6	6
(Sweden) E Ekblom	1	2
(South Africa) Y Vermaak	6	6
(United States) D Ganz	1	4
(United States) R Gerulaitis	6	6
(United States) S Tolleson	4	2
WC	(United Kingdom) J Fayter	1	5
16	(United States) M Redondo	6	7

Second round
4	(United Kingdom) V Wade	6	6
WC	(Australia) L Bowrey	1	4
(South Africa) Y Vermaak	6	4	6
(United States) B Potter	0	6	2
(United States) R Gerulaitis	6	6
LL	(United States) H Ludloff	0	0
(United States) S Walsh	2	2
16	(United States) M Redondo	6	6

Third round
4	(United Kingdom) V Wade	6	4	7
(South Africa) Y Vermaak	4	6	5
(United States) R Gerulaitis	6	6
16	(United States) M Redondo	0	2

Fourth round
4	(United Kingdom) V Wade	7	6
(United States) R Gerulaitis	5	4

==== Section 4 ====
First round
12	(Socialist Federal Republic of Yugoslavia) M Jaušovec	6	6
(Romania) F Mihai	3	1
Q	(Canada) W Barlow	1	3
(Australia) H Cawley	6	6
(United States) C Reynolds	1	5
(Czechoslovakia) H Strachoňová	6	7
Q	(Israel) P Peled	2	4
(United Kingdom) S Mappin	6	6

Second round
12	(Socialist Federal Republic of Yugoslavia) M Jaušovec	9	7	6
(United States) J Russell	8	9	4
(United Kingdom) M Tyler	6	6
(Australia) H Cawley	3	4
(United States) C Meyer	9	6
(Czechoslovakia) H Strachoňová	8	1
(United Kingdom) S Mappin	9	3	4
7	(Australia) W Turnbull	8	6	6

Third round
12	(Socialist Federal Republic of Yugoslavia) M Jaušovec	2	6	6
(United Kingdom) M Tyler	6	2	3
(United States) C Meyer	2	6
7	(Australia) W Turnbull	6	8

Fourth round
12	(Socialist Federal Republic of Yugoslavia) M Jaušovec	8	4	6
7	(Australia) W Turnbull	6	6	3

=== Bottom half ===
==== Section 5 ====
First round
WC	(United Kingdom) A Hobbs	1	2
(United States) S Margolin	6	6
(Uruguay) F Bonicelli	1	0
(France) F Dürr	6	6
(United States) K Harter	8	0
(South Africa) B Cuypers	9	6
WC	(United Kingdom) W Wooldridge	1	2
13	(Romania) V Ruzici	6	6

Second round
6	(Netherlands) B Stöve	6	6
(United States) S Margolin	1	3
(France) F Dürr	6	6
(United Kingdom) L Charles	2	2
Q	(Canada) M Blackwood	5	2
(South Africa) B Cuypers	7	6
(Argentina) R Giscafré	3	5
13	(Romania) V Ruzici	6	7

Third round
6	(Netherlands) B Stöve	6	6
(France) F Dürr	3	2
(South Africa) B Cuypers	6	4
13	(Romania) V Ruzici	8	6

Fourth round
6	(Netherlands) B Stöve	7	4	3
13	(Romania) V Ruzici	5	6	6

==== Section 6 ====
First round
15	(Czechoslovakia) R Maršíková	6	7
(United States) V Ziegenfuss	0	5
(United States) K May	6	8
(United States) P Teeguarden	1	6
(United States) J Newberry	7	6
(United States) J Stratton	5	4
(United States) L Forood	6	6
(France) B Simon	0	1

Second round
15	(Czechoslovakia) R Maršíková	9	4	6
(Australia) L Hunt	8	6	3
(United States) K May	6	6
(United States) C Stoll	2	3
(West Germany) S Hanika	3	8
(United States) J Newberry	6	9
(United States) L Forood	0	2
3	(Australia) E Goolagong Cawley	6	6

Third round
15	(Czechoslovakia) R Maršíková	4	6	13
(United States) K May	6	2	11
(United States) J Newberry	4	3
3	(Australia) E Goolagong Cawley	6	6

Fourth round
15	(Czechoslovakia) R Maršíková	2	1
3	(Australia) E Goolagong Cawley	6	6

==== Section 7 ====
First round
8	(Australia) D Fromholtz	8	6
(West Germany) K Ebbinghaus	6	3
(United States) T Holladay	6	7
(United States) K Latham	4	5
Q	(South Africa) I Kloss	6	6
(Australia) C O'Neil	1	1
WC	(United Kingdom) J Durie	1	7
Q	(United States) P Smith	6	9

Second round
8	(Australia) D Fromholtz	6	6
(United States) M Guerrant	3	2
(United States) A-M Bruning	6	5	4
(United States) T Holladay	3	7	6
(Australia) C Doerner	3	1
Q	(South Africa) I Kloss	6	6
Q	(United States) P Smith	4	4
11	(South Africa) M Kruger	6	6

Third round
8	(Australia) D Fromholtz	3	6	7
(United States) T Holladay	6	2	5
Q	(South Africa) I Kloss	4	4
11	(South Africa) M Kruger	6	6

Fourth round
8	(Australia) D Fromholtz	6	4	3
11	(South Africa) M Kruger	4	6	6

==== Section 8 ====
First round
9	(United States) T Austin	6	6	6
(United States) D Desfor	1	8	4
(United States) J DuVall	5	7	6
(United States) S Collins	7	5	1
(United States) B Jordan	6	9
(United States) M Louie	2	8
(United States) J Anthony	1	3
2	(United States) M Navratilova	6	6

Second round
9	(United States) T Austin	6	6
(United States) E Nagelsen	2	1
(United States) J DuVall	6	5	3
(United States) B Hallquist	2	7	6
(United States) B Jordan	6	6
(Argentina) V González	2	0
(Australia) P Whytcross	5	1
2	(United States) M Navratilova	7	6

Third round
9	(United States) T Austin	6	6
(United States) B Hallquist	3	3
(United States) B Jordan	6	1	4
2	(United States) M Navratilova	3	6	6

Fourth round
9	(United States) T Austin	2	3
2	(United States) M Navratilova	6	6

== See also ==
- Evert–Navratilova rivalry

Preceded by 1978 French Open – Women's singles	Grand Slam women's singles	Succeeded by 1978 US Open – Women's singles
