= Jan Šimbera =

Czech tennis player (born 1951)

- Country (sports): Czechoslovakia
- Born: 3 November 1951 (age 73)

Singles
- Career record: 5–10
- Highest ranking: No. 250 (16 January 1978)

Grand Slam singles results
- French Open: 1R (1977)
- Wimbledon: 2R (1978)

Doubles
- Career record: 6–13

Grand Slam doubles results
- French Open: 2R (1977)
- Wimbledon: 1R (1978)

Jan Šimbera (born 3 November 1951) is a Czech former professional tennis player who competed for Czechoslovakia during the 1970s. He has served as team captain of the Czech Republic Fed Cup team, which included an appearance in the semi-finals in 2000.

Šimbera won the Scandinavian Championships in 1975 and qualified for two grand slam singles main draws during his career. He debuted at the 1977 French Open, where he lost his first round match to Pavel Huťka in five sets. At the 1978 Wimbledon Championships he beat former quarter-finalist Charlie Pasarell during his qualifying run, then won his first round match over Andrew Jarrett.
