= 1978 Australian Open – Men's doubles =

Men's doubles
- 1978 Australian Open

Final
- Champion: (Poland) Wojtek Fibak (Australia) Kim Warwick
- Runner-up: (Australia) Paul Kronk (Australia) Cliff Letcher
- Score: 7–6, 7–5

Details
- Draw: 32
- Seeds: 8

Events
Singles	men	women		boys	girls
Doubles	men	women	mixed	boys	girls
WC Singles	men	women	quad
WC Doubles	men	women	quad
Legends	men	women	mixed
- Australian Open

Ray Ruffels and Allan Stone were the defending champions.

== Seeds ==
1. (Australia) John Alexander / (Australia) Phil Dent (second round)
2. (United States) Hank Pfister / (United States) Sherwood Stewart (quarterfinals)
3. (Australia) Mark Edmondson / (Australia) John Marks (first round)
4. (Poland) Wojtek Fibak / (Australia) Kim Warwick (champion)
5. (Australia) Ray Ruffels / (Australia) Allan Stone (quarterfinals)
6. (Australia) Ross Case / (Australia) Geoff Masters (second round)
7. (South Africa) Bernard Mitton / (South Africa) Raymond Moore (first round)
8. (Australia) Colin Dibley / (Australia) Chris Kachel (second round)

== Draw ==
Key

- Q = Qualifier
- WC = Wild card
- LL = Lucky loser
- Alt = Alternate
- ITF = ITF entry
- PR = Protected ranking
- SR = Special ranking
- SE = Special exempt
- JE = Junior exempt
- JR = Junior Accelerator Programme entrant
- CO = College Accelerator Programme entrant
- NG = Next Gen Accelerator Program entrant
- w/o = Walkover
- r = Retired
- d = Defaulted

=== Finals ===
Semifinals
(Australia) Syd Ball (Australia) Bob Carmichael	6	4
4	(Poland) Wojtek Fibak (Australia) Kim Warwick	7	6
(United Kingdom) Andrew Jarrett (United Kingdom) Jonathan Smith	1	6
(Australia) Paul Kronk (Australia) Cliff Letcher	6	7

Final
4	(Poland) Wojtek Fibak (Australia) Kim Warwick	7	7
(Australia) Paul Kronk (Australia) Cliff Letcher	6	5

=== Top half ===
First round
1	(Australia) J Alexander (Australia) P Dent	4	6	6
(Australia) D Collings (Australia) A Gardiner	6	4	4
(Australia) S Ball (Australia) B Carmichael	6	6
(Australia) V Eke (Australia) E Ewert	2	4
(United States) J Di Louie (Australia) B Drewett	2	3
(Austria) P Feigl (Australia) R Frawley	6	6
(Australia) S Docherty (United States) H Fritz	3	5
8	(Australia) C Dibley (Australia) C Kachel	6	7
4	(Poland) W Fibak (Australia) K Warwick	6	4	10
(Australia) M Anderson (Australia) M Fancutt	2	6	8
(Australia) T Roche (Australia) P Smylie	4	4
(New Zealand) R Simpson (Australia) J Trickey	6	6
(Australia) W Maher (Australia) N Phillips	6	7
(United States) G Fritz (United States) C Stansbury	2	6
(India) R Krishnan (India) S Menon	3	6	3
5	(Australia) R Ruffels (Australia) A Stone	6	3	6

Second round
1	(Australia) J Alexander (Australia) P Dent	6	2	4
(Australia) S Ball (Australia) B Carmichael	4	6	6
(Austria) P Feigl (Australia) R Frawley	6	7
8	(Australia) C Dibley (Australia) C Kachel	3	5
4	(Poland) W Fibak (Australia) K Warwick	6	7
(New Zealand) R Simpson (Australia) J Trickey	4	5
(Australia) W Maher (Australia) N Phillips	6	7	6
5	(Australia) R Ruffels (Australia) A Stone	7	6	8

Quarterfinals
(Australia) S Ball (Australia) B Carmichael	6	7
(Austria) P Feigl (Australia) R Frawley	2	5
4	(Poland) W Fibak (Australia) K Warwick	6	5	6
5	(Australia) R Ruffels (Australia) A Stone	4	7	4

Semifinals
(Australia) S Ball (Australia) B Carmichael	6	4
4	(Poland) W Fibak (Australia) K Warwick	7	6

=== Bottom half ===
First round
6	(Australia) R Case (Australia) G Masters	6	6
(Australia) T Clements (Australia) T Stone	0	4
(United Kingdom) A Jarrett (United Kingdom) J Smith	6	6
(Australia) P McNamara (Australia) P McNamee	2	4
(Australia) D Carter (Australia) T Rocavert	4	3
(Australia) P Campbell (Finland) L Palin	6	6
(Egypt) I El Shafei (New Zealand) B Fairlie	7	6
3	(Australia) M Edmondson (Australia) J Marks	5	4
7	(South Africa) B Mitton (South Africa) R Moore	6	5	4
(United States) T Gullikson (United States) G Hardie	4	7	6
(Australia) D Crealy (Australia) B Giltinan	2	7	3
(Australia) P Kronk (Australia) C Letcher	6	6	6
(Australia) C Fancutt (United States) T Wilkison	6	3	3
(United States) V Amaya (Australia) J James	3	6	6
(Australia) W Girle (Australia) A Rae	0	2
2	(United States) H Pfister (United States) S Stewart	6	6

Second round
6	(Australia) R Case (Australia) G Masters	2	4
(United Kingdom) A Jarrett (United Kingdom) J Smith	6	6
(Australia) P Campbell (Finland) L Palin	4	3
(Egypt) I El Shafei (New Zealand) B Fairlie	6	6
(United States) T Gullikson (United States) G Hardie	6	3	3
(Australia) P Kronk (Australia) C Letcher	4	6	6
(United States) V Amaya (Australia) J James
2	(United States) H Pfister (United States) S Stewart	w/o

Quarterfinals
(United Kingdom) A Jarrett (United Kingdom) J Smith	6	6
(Egypt) I El Shafei (New Zealand) B Fairlie	3	1
(Australia) P Kronk (Australia) C Letcher	6	6
2	(United States) H Pfister (United States) S Stewart	3	2

Semifinals
(United Kingdom) A Jarrett (United Kingdom) J Smith	1	6
(Australia) P Kronk (Australia) C Letcher	6	7
