= 1979 Australian Open – Men's singles qualifying =

Men's singles qualifying
- 1979 Australian Open

Events
Singles	men	women		boys	girls
Doubles	men	women	mixed	boys	girls
WC Singles	men	women	quad
WC Doubles	men	women	quad
Legends	men	women	mixed

Qualification
Singles	men	women
- Australian Open

This article displays the qualifying draw for men's singles at the 1979 Australian Open.

== Seeds ==
1. (United States) Robert Van't Hof (first round)
2. (United States) Glenn Petrovic (second round)
3. (Australia) Ernie Ewert (second round)
4. (Austria) Robert Reininger (first round)
5. (Australia) Alvin Gardiner (qualified)
6. -
7. (United States) Cary Stansbury (first round)
8. (Australia) Charlie Fancutt (qualifying competition, lucky loser)
9. (New Zealand) Chris Gunning (second round)
10. (Canada) Harry Fritz (second round)
11. (Israel) Shlomo Glickstein (qualified)
12. (United States) Jim Delaney (qualifying competition, lucky loser)
13. (United States) Jeremy Cohen (qualifying competition, lucky loser)
14. (New Zealand) David Mustard (first round)
15. (Australia) Syd Ball (qualified)
16. (United Kingdom) Rohun Beven (first round)

== Qualifiers ==
1. (Australia) Wayne Hampson
2. (Australia) John Trickey
3. (Australia) Ray Ruffels
4. (West Germany) Ulrich Marten
5. (Australia) Alvin Gardiner
6. (Australia) Phil Davies
7. (Australia) Syd Ball
8. (Israel) Shlomo Glickstein

== Lucky losers ==
1. (United States) Jim Delaney
2. (United States) Jeremy Cohen
3. (Australia) Charlie Fancutt

== Qualifying draw ==
Key

- Q = Qualifier
- WC = Wild card
- LL = Lucky loser
- Alt = Alternate
- ITF = ITF entry
- PR = Protected ranking
- SR = Special ranking
- SE = Special exempt
- JE = Junior exempt
- JR = Junior Accelerator Programme entrant
- CO = College Accelerator Programme entrant
- NG = Next Gen Accelerator Program entrant
- w/o = Walkover
- r = Retired
- d = Defaulted

=== First qualifier ===
First round
1	(United States) Robert Van't Hof	6	3
(Australia) Wayne Hampson	7	6
(Austria) Helmar Stiegler	7	6
(Australia) Paul Dougherty	6	0
(New Zealand) Peter Hampton	3	2
(United States) Rand Evett	6	6
(Australia) Terry Smith	5	4
12	(United States) Jim Delaney	7	6

Second round
(Australia) Wayne Hampson	6	7
(Austria) Helmar Stiegler	4	5
(United States) Rand Evett	1	4
12	(United States) Jim Delaney	6	6

Qualifying competition
(Australia) Wayne Hampson	7	6
12	(United States) Jim Delaney	5	2

=== Second qualifier ===
First round
2	(United States) Glenn Petrovic	6	6
(Australia) Simon Clarke	3	4
(Australia) John Trickey	3	6	9
(Australia) Victor Eke	6	3	7
(Australia) Peter Della Vedova	6	4
(Australia) Wayne Pascoe	7	6
(Australia) Andrew Cook	2	1
13	(United States) Jeremy Cohen	6	6

Second round
2	(United States) Glenn Petrovic	5	4
(Australia) John Trickey	7	6
(Australia) Wayne Pascoe	6	3	10
13	(United States) Jeremy Cohen	4	6	12

Qualifying competition
(Australia) John Trickey	6	4	6
13	(United States) Jeremy Cohen	4	6	2

=== Third qualifier ===
First round
3	(Australia) Ernie Ewert	7	6
(Australia) Jeff Schneider	5	3
(Australia) Ray Ruffels	6	6
(Australia) Brian Williams	4	4
(Australia) Brad Guan	6	6	17
(Austria) Filip Krajcik	7	4	19
(Australia) Broderick Dyke	5	3
9	(New Zealand) Chris Gunning	7	6

Second round
3	(Australia) Ernie Ewert	3	6
(Australia) Ray Ruffels	6	7
(Austria) Filip Krajcik	7	7
9	(New Zealand) Chris Gunning	6	6

Qualifying competition
(Australia) Ray Ruffels	7	6
(Austria) Filip Krajcik	6	4

=== Fourth qualifier ===
First round
4	(Austria) Robert Reininger	3	6	4
(Australia) Stephen Myers	6	4	6
(Australia) Ray Kelly	6	6
(Australia) David Chapman	1	0
(Australia) David Whyte	4	2
(West Germany) Ulrich Marten	6	6
(Australia) P. Joyce	4	3
10	(Canada) Harry Fritz	6	6

Second round
(Australia) Stephen Myers	1	6
(Australia) Ray Kelly	6	7
(West Germany) Ulrich Marten	4	7	6
10	(Canada) Harry Fritz	6	5	3

Qualifying competition
(Australia) Ray Kelly	6	3
(West Germany) Ulrich Marten	7	6

=== Fifth qualifier ===
First round
5	(Australia) Alvin Gardiner	6	6
(Netherlands) Paul van Min	2	3
(Australia) Peter Johnston	6	6
(Australia) Peter Barton	4	2
(Australia) Matt Lemke	2	3
(United States) K. Curry	6	6
(Australia) Wayne Cowley	6	3
14	(New Zealand) David Mustard	3	0^{r}

Second round
5	(Australia) Alvin Gardiner	6	6
(Australia) Peter Johnston	2	2
(United States) K. Curry	4	4
(Australia) Wayne Cowley	6	6

Qualifying competition
5	(Australia) Alvin Gardiner	7	6
(Australia) Wayne Cowley	6	3

=== Sixth qualifier ===
First round
(Australia) John McCurdy	4	6	6
(Australia) C. Soroff	6	4	2
(Australia) Bill Gilmour	6	6
(Australia) Carl Limberger	4	4
(Australia) E. Sini	1	2
(Australia) Eddie Myers	6	6
(Australia) Phil Davies	6	6
16	(United Kingdom) Rohun Beven	4	2

Second round
(Australia) John McCurdy	4	6
(Australia) Bill Gilmour	6	7
(Australia) Eddie Myers	4	4
(Australia) Phil Davies	6	6

Qualifying competition
(Australia) Bill Gilmour	3	6	1
(Australia) Phil Davies	6	4	6

=== Seventh qualifier ===
First round
7	(United States) Cary Stansbury	4	4
(Australia) Steve Wood	6	6
(Australia) Robert Keighery	7	6
(United Kingdom) Chris Bradnam	6	3
(Australia) Tim Clements	1	3
(Australia) Pat Serret	6	6
(Australia) Gary Thoroughgood	3	0
15	(Australia) Syd Ball	6	6

Second round
(Australia) Steve Wood	6	6
(Australia) Robert Keighery	3	4
(Australia) Pat Serret	1	2
15	(Australia) Syd Ball	6	6

Qualifying competition
(Australia) Steve Wood	2	1
15	(Australia) Syd Ball	6	6

=== Eighth qualifier ===
First round
8	(Australia) Charlie Fancutt	6	6
(Australia) Peter Smylie	1	0
(West Germany) Thomas Furst	6	6
(Pakistan) Saeed Meer	4	3
(Austria) Kurt Lechner	4	2
(Australia) Greg Braun	6	6
(Netherlands) Peter Geraerts	1	5
11	(Israel) Shlomo Glickstein	6	7

Second round
8	(Australia) Charlie Fancutt	6	6
(West Germany) Thomas Furst	2	0
(Australia) Greg Braun	7	6	8
11	(Israel) Shlomo Glickstein	6	7	10

Qualifying competition
8	(Australia) Charlie Fancutt	5	6
11	(Israel) Shlomo Glickstein	7	7
