= Bill Gilmour Jr. =

Australian tennis player

Bill Gilmour
- Full name: Bill Gilmour Jr.
- Country (sports): Australia
- Born: 29 May 1960 (age 65)
- Plays: Right-handed

Singles
- Career record: 0–2
- Highest ranking: No. 454 (26 Dec 1979)

Grand Slam singles results
- Australian Open: Q3 (1979)
- Wimbledon: Q1 (1978, 1980)

Doubles
- Career record: 0–2
- Highest ranking: No. 600 (30 Jul 1984)

Grand Slam doubles results
- Wimbledon: Q1 (1978)

Bill Gilmour Jr. (born 29 May 1960) is an Australian former professional tennis player.

Gilmour won a boys' doubles tile at the 1978 Australian Open (with Michael Fancutt). His father, Bill Sr, was also an Australian Open junior champion and played on the international tour, later becoming a Davis Cup referee.

While competing on the professional circuit, Gilmour had a best singles world ranking of 454 and made qualifying draw appearances at Wimbledon. He now coaches at his family's tennis centre in Sydney.
