= Linda Mottram =

British tennis player

- Country (sports): United Kingdom
- Plays: Right-handed

Singles

Grand Slam singles results
- Australian Open: 3R (1975)
- French Open: 2R (1977)
- Wimbledon: 3R (1975)

Doubles

Grand Slam doubles results
- French Open: 1R (1977)
- Wimbledon: QF (1978)

Grand Slam mixed doubles results
- Wimbledon: 3R (1978)

Linda Mottram is a British former professional tennis player.

Active on tour in the 1970s, Mottram is the daughter of tennis players Tony Mottram and Joy Gannon. She has an elder brother, Buster Mottram, who also competed professionally.

Mottram was runner-up to Evonne Goolagong at the 1975 Auckland Open. She reached the singles third round at both the Australian Open and Wimbledon in 1975, but her best grand slam run was a quarter-final appearance in doubles at the 1978 Wimbledon Championships (with Glynis Coles).
