= 1978 Wimbledon Championships – Women's doubles =

Women's doubles
- 1978 Wimbledon Championships

Final
- Champions: (Australia) Kerry Reid (Australia) Wendy Turnbull
- Runners-up: (Socialist Federal Republic of Yugoslavia) Mima Jaušovec (Romania) Virginia Ruzici
- Score: 4–6, 9–8^{(12–10)}, 6–3

Details
- Draw: 48 (4 Q )
- Seeds: 8

Events
Singles	men	women		boys	girls
Doubles	men	women	mixed	boys	girls
← 1977 ·	Wimbledon Championships	· 1979 →

Helen Cawley and JoAnne Russell were the defending champions, but lost in the quarterfinals to Françoise Dürr and Virginia Wade.

Kerry Reid and Wendy Turnbull defeated Mima Jaušovec and Virginia Ruzici in the final, 4–6, 9–8^{(12–10)}, 6–3 to win the ladies' doubles tennis title at the 1978 Wimbledon Championships.

== Seeds ==
1. (United States) Billie Jean King / (United States) Martina Navratilova (quarterfinals)
2. (Australia) Evonne Cawley / (Netherlands) Betty Stöve (third round, withdrew)
3. (France) Françoise Dürr / (United Kingdom) Virginia Wade (semifinals)
4. (Australia) Kerry Reid / (Australia) Wendy Turnbull (champions)
5. (Australia) Helen Cawley / (United States) JoAnne Russell (quarterfinals)
6. (United Kingdom) Sue Barker / (United States) Mona Guerrant (semifinals)
7. (Socialist Federal Republic of Yugoslavia) Mima Jaušovec / (Romania) Virginia Ruzici (final)
8. (South Africa) Ilana Kloss / (South Africa) Marise Kruger (quarterfinals)

Click on the seed number of a player to go to their draw section.

== Draw ==
=== Key ===
- Q = Qualifier
- WC = Wild card
- LL = Lucky loser
- Alt = Alternate
- SE = Special exempt
- PR = Protected ranking
- ITF = ITF entry
- JE = Junior exempt
- w/o = Walkover
- r = Retired
- d = Defaulted
- SR = Special ranking

=== Finals ===
Quarterfinals
1	(United States) Billie Jean King (United States) Martina Navratilova	3	6	4
6	(United Kingdom) Sue Barker (United States) Mona Guerrant	6	4	6
4	(Australia) Kerry Reid (Australia) Wendy Turnbull	1	7	6
8	(South Africa) Ilana Kloss (South Africa) Marise Kruger	6	5	4
5	(Australia) Helen Cawley (United States) JoAnne Russell	5	3
3	(France) Françoise Dürr (United Kingdom) Virginia Wade	7	6
7	(Socialist Federal Republic of Yugoslavia) Mima Jaušovec (Romania) Virginia Ruzici	6	5	6
(United Kingdom) Glynis Coles (United Kingdom) Linda Mottram	4	7	3

Semifinals
6	(United Kingdom) Sue Barker (United States) Mona Guerrant	3	2
4	(Australia) Kerry Reid (Australia) Wendy Turnbull	6	6
3	(France) Françoise Dürr (United Kingdom) Virginia Wade	4	4
7	(Socialist Federal Republic of Yugoslavia) Mima Jaušovec (Romania) Virginia Ruzici	6	6

Final
4	(Australia) Kerry Reid (Australia) Wendy Turnbull	4	9^{12}	6
7	(Socialist Federal Republic of Yugoslavia) Mima Jaušovec (Romania) Virginia Ruzici	6	8^{10}	3

=== Top half ===
==== Section 1 ====
First round
(Australia) C O'Neil (Australia) P Whytcross	1	4
(United States) L Forood (Argentina) R Giscafré	6	6
Q	(Australia) N Gregory (Hungary) M Pinterová	3	2
(Czechoslovakia) R Maršíková (Netherlands) E Vessies-Appel	6	6
(United States) T Holladay (United States) P Smith	6	6
(United States) B Hallquist (United States) S McInerney	2	2
(United States) K Harter (United States) C Stoll	3	6	6
(Sweden) E Ekblom (Sweden) I Bentzer	6	2	3

Second round
1	(United States) BJ King (United States) M Navratilova	3	6	6
(United States) L Forood (Argentina) R Giscafré	6	4	3
(United States) L Antonoplis (Australia) D Evers	6	6
(Czechoslovakia) R Maršíková (Netherlands) E Vessies-Appel	4	3
(United States) T Holladay (United States) P Smith	5	2
(United States) P Bostrom (Australia) K Ruddell	7	6
(United States) K Harter (United States) C Stoll	3	3
6	(United Kingdom) S Barker (United States) M Guerrant	6	6

Third round
1	(United States) BJ King (United States) M Navratilova	6	6
(United States) L Antonoplis (Australia) D Evers	1	4
(United States) P Bostrom (Australia) K Ruddell	2	3
6	(United Kingdom) S Barker (United States) M Guerrant	6	6

Quarterfinals
1	(United States) BJ King (United States) M Navratilova	3	6	4
6	(United Kingdom) S Barker (United States) M Guerrant	6	4	6

==== Section 2 ====
First round
(Sweden) H Anliot (Sweden) N Bohm	6	4	4
(United States) D Desfor (United States) G Galt	1	6	6
(Argentina) V González (Argentina) I Madruga	6	6
(United States) A Kiyomura (United Kingdom) S Mappin	8	8
(Australia) J Dalton (Australia) W Paish	6	6
(West Germany) S Hanika (West Germany) I Riedel	3	2
(United States) L duPont (United States) K May	4	4
8	(South Africa) I Kloss (South Africa) M Kruger	6	6

Second round
4	(Australia) K Reid (Australia) W Turnbull	6	6
(United States) D Desfor (United States) G Galt	0	1
LL	(Australia) S Saliba (Australia) M Sawyer	0	1
(United States) A Kiyomura (United Kingdom) S Mappin	6	6
(Australia) J Dalton (Australia) W Paish	2	6	7
(South Africa) B Cuypers (United States) V Ziegenfuss	6	3	5
Q	(United States) J Nachand (United States) N Yeargin	0	2
8	(South Africa) I Kloss (South Africa) M Kruger	6	6

Third round
4	(Australia) K Reid (Australia) W Turnbull	7	7	6
(United States) A Kiyomura (United Kingdom) S Mappin	9	5	2
(Australia) J Dalton (Australia) W Paish	2	2
8	(South Africa) I Kloss (South Africa) M Kruger	6	6

Quarterfinals
4	(Australia) K Reid (Australia) W Turnbull	1	7	6
8	(South Africa) I Kloss (South Africa) M Kruger	6	5	4

=== Bottom half ===
==== Section 3 ====
First round
(United States) C Meyer (Czechoslovakia) R Tomanová	6	6
(United States) B Jordan (United States) K Latham	3	4
(United States) C Reynolds (Denmark) H Sparre-Viragh	6	2	6
(Canada) M Blackwood (United States) P Teeguarden	3	6	4
(Australia) L Bowrey (France) G Lovera	2	6	5
(United States) S Acker (United States) J Anthony	6	4	7
(Australia) D Fromholtz (United States) M Redondo	2	4
(Romania) F Mihai (United States) E Nagelsen	6	6

Second round
5	(Australia) H Cawley (United States) J Russell	6	6
(United States) C Meyer (Czechoslovakia) R Tomanová	3	3
(United States) J Stratton (Sweden) M Wikstedt	6	3	5
(United States) C Reynolds (Denmark) H Sparre-Viragh	3	6	7
(United States) S Acker (United States) J Anthony	6	6
(South Africa) T Harford (United States) S Tolleson	2	3
(Romania) F Mihai (United States) E Nagelsen	1	1
3	(France) F Dürr (United Kingdom) V Wade	6	6

Third round
5	(Australia) H Cawley (United States) J Russell	6	4	6
(United States) C Reynolds (Denmark) H Sparre-Viragh	0	6	2
(United States) S Acker (United States) J Anthony	4	1
3	(France) F Dürr (United Kingdom) V Wade	6	6

Quarterfinals
5	(Australia) H Cawley (United States) J Russell	5	3
3	(France) F Dürr (United Kingdom) V Wade	7	6

==== Section 4 ====
First round
7	(Socialist Federal Republic of Yugoslavia) M Jaušovec (Romania) V Ruzici	8	6
(United Kingdom) M Tyler (South Africa) Y Vermaak	6	4
(United Kingdom) L Charles (United Kingdom) W Wooldridge	3	6	6
(Czechoslovakia) H Mandlíková (Czechoslovakia) H Strachoňová	6	2	2
(United Kingdom) G Coles (United Kingdom) L Mottram	6	7
(United States) A-M Bruning (United States) S Walsh	4	5
(United States) J Newberry (United States) P Shriver	8	1
2	(Australia) E Cawley (Netherlands) B Stöve	9	6

Second round
7	(Socialist Federal Republic of Yugoslavia) M Jaušovec (Romania) V Ruzici	6	6
Q	(South Africa) G Sammel (United States) C-A Thomas	4	4
Q	(Australia) J Harrison (United States) N Weigel	2	3
(United Kingdom) L Charles (United Kingdom) W Wooldridge	6	6
(United Kingdom) G Coles (United Kingdom) L Mottram	8	7
(Australia) L Hunt (United States) B Potter	6	5
(Australia) C Doerner (United States) R Gerulaitis	2	0
2	(Australia) E Cawley (Netherlands) B Stöve	6	6

Third round
7	(Socialist Federal Republic of Yugoslavia) M Jaušovec (Romania) V Ruzici	7	7	6
(United Kingdom) L Charles (United Kingdom) W Wooldridge	5	9	3
(United Kingdom) G Coles (United Kingdom) L Mottram	w/o
2	(Australia) E Cawley (Netherlands) B Stöve

Quarterfinals
7	(Socialist Federal Republic of Yugoslavia) M Jaušovec (Romania) V Ruzici	6	5	6
(United Kingdom) G Coles (United Kingdom) L Mottram	4	7	3
