= Ruta Gerulaitis =

American tennis player (b. 1955)

- Full name: Ruta Gerulaitis
- Country (sports): United States
- Born: November 18, 1955 (age 69) New York, U.S.

Singles

Grand Slam singles results
- French Open: QF (1979)
- Wimbledon: 4R (1978)
- US Open: 3R (1976)

Doubles

Grand Slam doubles results
- French Open: 1R (1978, 1982)
- Wimbledon: 2R (1978, 1979)
- US Open: 2R (1977, 1978)

Ruta Gerulaitis (Lithuanian: Rūta Gerulaitytė; born November 18, 1955) is a former professional tennis player from the United States. She is the sister of Vitas Gerulaitis.

== Biography ==
=== Early life ===
Gerulaitis, the daughter of Lithuanian immigrants, grew up in New York City. She and Vitas, an elder brother, were the only children of Vitas Gerulaitis Sr. and Aldona Gerulaitienė (née Čenkutė).

It wasn’t until the age of 15 that she began playing tennis competitively.

=== Tennis career ===
Gerulaitis and her brother teamed up at the 1975 US Open to make the quarterfinals of the mixed doubles.

At the 1978 Wimbledon Championships, Gerulaitis made it to the fourth round of the singles and en route won a match against 16th seed Marita Redondo, in which she dropped just two games.

Her best performance in a grand slam tournament came at the 1979 French Open, where she was a singles quarterfinalist. Beating Chris O'Neil in the first round, she started her second round match with a 6–0 first set against 14th seed Ilana Kloss, before her South African opponent retired hurt. In the third round she upset eighth seed Betty Stöve in straight sets, then was beaten in the quarter-finals by the only other American remaining in the draw, eventual tournament champion Chris Evert.

She competed on the WTA Tour until 1980.

=== Personal life ===
Gerulaitis married ABC Sports vice-president John Martin in 1983.
