= Neil Rayner =

British tennis player

- Country (sports): Great Britain
- Born: 05/06/1959 Ilford, Essex
- Plays: RH

Singles

Grand Slam singles results
- Wimbledon: Q2 (1977, 1978, 1979)

Grand Slam mixed doubles results
- Wimbledon: 2R (1978)

Neil Rayner (born 1959) is a British former professional tennis player.

Rayner, a national junior indoor champion from Ilford, made appearances at Wimbledon during the late 1970s and early 1980s. While competing in singles qualifying he had a win over Pakistani Davis Cup player Saeed Meer in 1977. His only Wimbledon main draw came in mixed doubles in 1978, partnering Clare Harrison to a second round exit.
