= 1978 Wimbledon Championships – Girls' singles =

Girls' singles
- 1978 Wimbledon Championships

Final
- Champion: (United States) Tracy Austin
- Runner-up: (Czechoslovakia) Hana Mandlíková
- Score: 6–0, 3–6, 6–4

Events
Singles	men	women		boys	girls
Doubles	men	women	mixed	boys	girls
← 1977 ·	Wimbledon Championships	· 1979 →

Tracy Austin defeated Hana Mandlíková in the final, 6–0, 3–6, 6–4 to win the girls' singles tennis title at the 1978 Wimbledon Championships.

== Seeds ==
1. (United States) Tracy Austin (champion)
2. (Czechoslovakia) Hana Mandlíková (final)
3. (United States) Peanut Louie (semifinals)
4. (United States) Anna-Maria Fernandez (quarterfinals)
5. (Czechoslovakia) Hana Strachoňová (third round)
6. (Australia) Amanda Tobin (quarterfinals)
7. (United States) Maria Rothschild (third round)
8. (Argentina) Claudia Casabianca (quarterfinals)

Click on the seed number of a player to go to their draw section.

== Draw ==
=== Key ===
- Q = Qualifier
- WC = Wild card
- LL = Lucky loser
- Alt = Alternate
- SE = Special exempt
- PR = Protected ranking
- ITF = ITF entry
- JE = Junior exempt
- w/o = Walkover
- r = Retired
- d = Defaulted
- SR = Special ranking

=== Finals ===
Quarterfinals
1	(United States) Tracy Austin	4	6	6
8	(Argentina) Claudia Casabianca	6	2	0
(United Kingdom) Jo Durie	9	6
4	(United States) Anna-Maria Fernandez	8	3
3	(United States) Peanut Louie	7	6
6	(Australia) Amanda Tobin	5	1
(West Germany) Eva Pfaff	7	2
2	(Czechoslovakia) Hana Mandlíková	9	6

Semifinals
1	(United States) Tracy Austin	6	6
(United Kingdom) Jo Durie	1	2
3	(United States) Peanut Louie	8	2	4
2	(Czechoslovakia) Hana Mandlíková	6	6	6

Final
1	(United States) Tracy Austin	6	3	6
2	(Czechoslovakia) Hana Mandlíková	0	6	4

=== Top half ===
==== Section 1 ====
First round
(Belgium) Nicole Mabille	6	6
(Mexico) María Carmen Casta	3	2
(Sweden) Lena Sandin	2	7	4
(United Kingdom) Cathy Drury	6	5	6

Second round
1	(United States) Tracy Austin	6	6
(Belgium) N Mabille	1	0
(West Germany) Petra van Oyen
(New Zealand) Debbie Leat	w/o
8	(Argentina) Claudia Casabianca	6	6
(Australia) Linda Cassell	0	3
(United Kingdom) C Drury	6	8
(Israel) Hagith Zubery	2	6

Third round
1	(United States) T Austin	6	6
(West Germany) P van Oyen	1	3
8	(Argentina) C Casabianca	6	2	6
(United Kingdom) C Drury	3	6	1

Quarterfinals
1	(United States) T Austin	4	6	6
8	(Argentina) C Casabianca	6	2	0

==== Section 2 ====
First round
(Portugal) Patricia Alvarenga	3	2
(Australia) Karen Gulley	6	6
4	(United States) Anna-Maria Fernandez	6	6
(Kenya) Susan Wakhungu	2	1

Second round
5	(Czechoslovakia) Hana Strachoňová	6	6
(Brazil) Claudia Monteiro	1	2
(Australia) K Gulley	1	3
(United Kingdom) Jo Durie	6	6
4	(United States) A-M Fernandez	6	6
(Philippines) Pia Tamayo	2	3
(Republic of Ireland) Louise Tuff	4	2
(Switzerland) Christiane Jolissaint	6	6

Third round
5	(Czechoslovakia) H Strachoňová	8	1	2
(United Kingdom) J Durie	6	6	6
4	(United States) A-M Fernandez	6	7
(Switzerland) C Jolissaint	3	5

Quarterfinals
(United Kingdom) J Durie	9	6
4	(United States) A-M Fernandez	8	3

=== Bottom half ===
==== Section 3 ====
First round
(Pakistan) Mahmuda Jafarey	4	1
(Trinidad and Tobago) Beverly Corbie	6	6
(Netherlands) Marianne van der Torre	5	1
(South Africa) Rosalyn Fairbank	7	6
(Bulgaria) Marina Kondova	3	0
(Canada) Wendy Barlow	6	6

Second round
(Italy) Sabina Simmonds	6	6
(United Kingdom) Debbie Jevans	4	2
(Trinidad and Tobago) B Corbie	0	2
3	(United States) Peanut Louie	6	6
(Argentina) Ivanna Madruga	7	4	4
(South Africa) R Fairbank	5	6	6
(Canada) W Barlow	2	6
6	(Australia) Amanda Tobin	6	8

Third round
(Italy) S Simmonds	6	3
3	(United States) M Louie	8	6
(South Africa) R Fairbank	5	5
6	(Australia) A Tobin	7	7

Quarterfinals
3	(United States) M Louie	7	6
6	(Australia) A Tobin	5	1

==== Section 4 ====
First round
(Poland) Dorota Dziekońska	3	8	5
7	(United States) Maria Rothschild	6	6	7

Second round
(India) Amreeta Ahluwalia	3	2
(West Germany) Eva Pfaff	6	6
(Denmark) Annette Kundby-Nielsen	1	1
7	(United States) M Rothschild	6	6
(France) Martine Bureau	6	6
(Japan) Hiroko Mimachi	2	1
(Norway) Marianne Haller	1	1
2	(Czechoslovakia) Hana Mandlíková	6	6

Third round
(West Germany) E Pfaff	5	6	6
7	(United States) M Rothschild	7	1	4
(France) M Bureau	0	0
2	(Czechoslovakia) H Mandlíková	6	6

Quarterfinals
(West Germany) E Pfaff	7	2
2	(Czechoslovakia) H Mandlíková	9	6
