= 1979 South Australian Open =

- Date: 10–16 December
- Edition: 78th
- Draw: 32S / 16D
- Prize money: $50,000
- Surface: Grass
- Location: Adelaide, Australia
- Venue: Memorial Drive Park

Champions

Men's singles
- (Australia) Kim Warwick

Women's singles
- (Czechoslovakia) Hana Mandlíková

Men's doubles
- (Australia) Colin Dibley / (Australia) Chris Kachel

Women's doubles
- (Czechoslovakia) Hana Mandlíková / (Romania) Virginia Ruzici
- South Australian Open

The 1979 South Australian Open, also known by its sponsored name Berri Fruit Juices South Australian Open, was a men's and women's tennis tournament held at the Memorial Drive Park in Adelaide, Australia. It was the 78th edition of the tournament and was held from 10 December until 16 December 1979. Third-seeded Kim Warwick won the men's singles title in a final that was shortened to best-of-three format due to a rain delay. Fourth-seeded Hana Mandlíková won the women's singles title.

== Finals ==
=== Men's singles ===
(Australia) Kim Warwick defeated (South Africa) Bernard Mitton 7–6^{(7–3)}, 6–4

- It was Warwick's only singles title of the year and the 2nd of his career.

=== Women's singles ===
(Czechoslovakia) Hana Mandlíková defeated (Romania) Virginia Ruzici 7–5, 2–2 ret.

=== Men's doubles ===
(Australia) Colin Dibley / (Australia) Chris Kachel defeated (Australia) John Alexander / (Australia) Phil Dent 6–7, 7–6, 6–4

- It was Dibley's 2nd title of the year and the 18th of his career. It was Kachel's only title of the year and the 2nd of his career.

=== Women's doubles ===
(Czechoslovakia) Hana Mandlíková / (Romania) Virginia Ruzici defeated (United States) Pam Shriver / (United Kingdom) Sue Barker 2–6, 6–4, 6–4
