= 1978 Wimbledon Championships – Boys' singles =

Boys' singles
- 1978 Wimbledon Championships

Final
- Champion: (Czechoslovakia) Ivan Lendl
- Runner-up: (United States) Jeff Turpin
- Score: 6–3, 6–4

Events
Singles	men	women		boys	girls
Doubles	men	women	mixed	boys	girls
← 1977 ·	Wimbledon Championships	· 1979 →

Ivan Lendl defeated Jeff Turpin in the final, 6–3, 6–4 to win the boys' singles tennis title at the 1978 Wimbledon Championships.

== Seeds ==
1. (Czechoslovakia) Ivan Lendl (champion)
2. (Sweden) Per Hjertquist (semifinals)
3. (India) Ramesh Krishnan (third round)
4. (Sweden) Stefan Simonsson (quarterfinals)
5. (South Africa) Robbie Venter (semifinals)
6. (Australia) Bill Gilmour Jr. (first round)
7. (United States) John Corse (quarterfinals)
8. (United States) Blaine Willenborg (quarterfinals)

Click on the seed number of a player to go to their draw section.

== Draw ==
=== Key ===
- Q = Qualifier
- WC = Wild card
- LL = Lucky loser
- Alt = Alternate
- SE = Special exempt
- PR = Protected ranking
- ITF = ITF entry
- JE = Junior exempt
- w/o = Walkover
- r = Retired
- d = Defaulted
- SR = Special ranking

=== Finals ===
Quarterfinals
1	(Czechoslovakia) Ivan Lendl	8	6	6
8	(United States) Blaine Willenborg	9	1	0
5	(South Africa) Robbie Venter	9	1	6
4	(Sweden) Stefan Simonsson	7	6	2
(Canada) Glenn Michibata	8	3	3
(United States) Jeff Turpin	6	6	6
7	(United States) John Corse	3	6
2	(Sweden) Per Hjertquist	6	8

Semifinals
1	(Czechoslovakia) Ivan Lendl	6	1	6
5	(South Africa) Robbie Venter	3	6	3
(United States) Jeff Turpin	8	2	6
2	(Sweden) Per Hjertquist	6	6	3

Final
1	(Czechoslovakia) Ivan Lendl	6	6
(United States) Jeff Turpin	3	4

=== Top half ===
==== Section 1 ====
First round
(Spain) Gabriel Urpí	3	5
(Egypt) Tarek El-Sakka	6	7
(Finland) Petri Hietala	7	3
(United Kingdom) David Atkinson	9	6
(France) Peter Chiche	1	5
(Denmark) Michael Mortensen	6	7
(Australia) Pat Serret	7	6
(Portugal) Jose Manuel Cordeiro	5	3

Second round
1	(Czechoslovakia) Ivan Lendl	7	6
(Egypt) T El-Sakka	5	3
(Italy) Claudio Panatta	6	6
(United Kingdom) D Atkinson	0	3
8	(United States) Blaine Willenborg	6	6
(Denmark) M Mortensen	1	2
(Trinidad and Tobago) Brian Yearwood	1	4
(Australia) P Serret	6	6

Third round
1	(Czechoslovakia) I Lendl	6	6
(Italy) C Panatta	1	2
8	(United States) B Willenborg	6	7
(Australia) P Serret	2	5

Quarterfinals
1	(Czechoslovakia) I Lendl	8	6	6
8	(United States) B Willenborg	9	1	0

==== Section 2 ====
First round
5	(South Africa) Robbie Venter	2	6	9
(Netherlands) Marc Albert	6	4	7
(Norway) Erik Tisthammer	3	1
(Colombia) WA Paipa	6	6
4	(Sweden) Stefan Simonsson	6	7
(Switzerland) Ivan Dupasquier	3	5
(Austria) Bernhard Pils	6	6
(Republic of Ireland) Peter Hannon	3	1

Second round
5	(South Africa) R Venter	6	6
(Argentina) Alejandro Ganzábal	3	2
(Colombia) WA Paipa	3	0
(Australia) Michael Fancutt	6	6
4	(Sweden) S Simonsson	8	6
(Chile) Hans Gildemeister	6	2
(Poland) Andrzej Jagielski	2	1
(Austria) B Pils	6	6

Third round
5	(South Africa) R Venter	7	6
(Australia) M Fancutt	5	2
4	(Sweden) S Simonsson	6	6
(Austria) B Pils	1	4

Quarterfinals
5	(South Africa) R Venter	9	1	6
4	(Sweden) S Simonsson	7	6	2

=== Bottom half ===
==== Section 3 ====
First round
(Malaysia) Nik-Raof Daud	2	0
(Canada) Glenn Michibata	6	6
(Uruguay) Philippe Pinet	6	9
(Iran) Y Saleh	4	7
(Sudan) Khalid Farid	1	1
(United States) Jeff Turpin	6	6
(West Germany) Damir Keretić	6	6
6	(Australia) Bill Gilmour Jr.	2	2

Second round
(South Africa) Christo Steyn	4	6	4
(Canada) G Michibata	6	1	6
(Uruguay) P Pinet	2	3
3	(India) Ramesh Krishnan	6	6
(United States) J Turpin	6	6
(Mexico) Edgar Giffenig	3	2
(The Bahamas) Lawrence Field	0	3
(West Germany) D Keretić	6	6

Third round
(Canada) G Michibata	6	6	6
3	(India) R Krishnan	2	8	4
(United States) J Turpin	6	8
(West Germany) D Keretić	3	6

Quarterfinals
(Canada) G Michibata	8	3	3
(United States) J Turpin	6	6	6

==== Section 4 ====
First round
(Venezuela) José Juan Boveda	6	6
(Belgium) Jan Vanlangendonck	2	3
(Netherlands) Michael Sprott	3	6	2
(Bolivia) Mario Martínez	6	4	6
(Jamaica) Stuart Sarnia	6	6
(Socialist Federal Republic of Yugoslavia) Marko Ostoja	2	3
(Sri Lanka) Sujit Fernando	0	0
(Brazil) Cássio Motta	6	6

Second round
(United Kingdom) Jeremy Dier	2	3
(Venezuela) JJ Boveda	6	6
(Bolivia) M Martínez	1	5
(United States) John Corse	6	7
(Jamaica) S Sarnia	6	6
(Pakistan) Jamil Ahmed	3	4
(Brazil) C Motta	6	6
2	(Sweden) Per Hjertquist	8	8

Third round
(Venezuela) JJ Boveda	8	6	6
(United States) J Corse	9	4	8
(Jamaica) S Sarnia	4	4
2	(Sweden) P Hjertquist	6	6

Quarterfinals
7	(United States) J Corse	3	6
2	(Sweden) P Hjertquist	6	8
