= Ray Kelly (tennis) =

Australian former tennis player

- Country (sports): Australia

Singles
- Career record: 2–9
- Highest ranking: No. 288 (12 December 1976)

Grand Slam singles results
- Australian Open: Q3 (1979)
- Wimbledon: Q2 (1976, 1978)

Doubles
- Career record: 0–11

Grand Slam doubles results
- Australian Open: 1R (1977 (Dec))
- Wimbledon: 1R (1978, 1979)

Ray Kelly is an Australian former professional tennis player.

Kelly, a Queenslander, was a two-time Australian Open boys' singles champion and was ranked as high as number two in the world junior rankings. He competed up until 1981 on the professional tour and reached a best singles ranking of 288 in the world. His career including appearances in the doubles main draw at Wimbledon.

From 2008 to 2010 he served as coach of the Hong Kong Davis Cup team.
