= John Trickey =

Australian tennis coach and former player

- Country (sports): Australia

Singles
- Career record: 3–15
- Highest ranking: No. 253 (2 July 1977)

Grand Slam singles results
- Australian Open: 1R (1975, 1976, 1977, 1979, 1980)
- French Open: Q2 (1975)
- Wimbledon: Q3 (1975, 1976, 1978)

Doubles
- Career record: 14–30

Grand Slam doubles results
- Australian Open: 2R (1974, 1978, 1979)
- French Open: 1R (1977, 1978)
- Wimbledon: 2R (1977, 1978, 1979)

John Trickey is an Australian tennis coach and former professional player.

Trickey, a junior state champion in Victoria, competed on the professional tour during the 1970s and was a regular at the Australian Open. He featured in men's doubles main draws at both the French Open and Wimbledon.

From 1998 to 2003 he served as Tennis Australia's national women's coach.
