= Jay Royappa =

Indian tennis player

- Full name: Jayakumar Royappa
- Country (sports): India
- Born: 1954
- Died: 29 May 2005 (aged 51) Anna Nagar, Tamil Nadu

Singles
- Career record: 3–8
- Highest ranking: No. 207 (3 Jan 1979)

Grand Slam singles results
- Wimbledon: 2R (1978)

Jayakumar Royappa was an Indian professional tennis player.

A native of Chennai, Royappa was the son of former Tamil Nadu Chief Secretary E.P. Royappa.

Royappa was a national junior hardcourt champion and competed on the professional tour in the 1970s. He was described by The Hindu as a tall, wiry player with a powerful serve and unorthodox, wristy play. In 1973 he won the singles title at the Scottish Championships. Twice qualifying for the Wimbledon main draw, he won his first round match over Greg Halder in 1978, before losing to the third-seed Vitas Gerulaitis in the second round.

In 2005 he died of a heart attack at his home in Anna Nagar.
