= Marise Kruger =

South African tennis player

- Country (sports): South Africa
- Born: 17 July 1958 (age 67) Pretoria, South Africa
- Height: 1.68 m (5 ft 6 in)
- Plays: Right-handed (two-handed backhand)
- Prize money: no value

Singles
- Career record: no value
- Career titles: 2
- Highest ranking: No. 12

Grand Slam singles results
- French Open: 3R (1979)
- Wimbledon: QF (1978)
- US Open: 4R (1977)

Doubles
- Career record: no value

Grand Slam doubles results
- French Open: SF (1979)
- Wimbledon: QF (1977, 1978, 1979)
- US Open: QF (1979)

Grand Slam mixed doubles results
- Wimbledon: 2R (1976, 1977)

Marise Kruger (born 17 July 1958) is a former South African tennis player who was active in the second half of the 1970s.

== Tennis career ==
Kruger started playing tennis when she was five. She reached the girl's final at the 1976 Wimbledon Championships, won the junior singles title at the 1976 US Open, and won the singles title at the junior Orange Bowl tournament in December 1976.

In June 1976, Kruger was runner-up at the Kent Championships in Beckenham, losing in three sets to Olga Morozova. In the preceding weeks, she had won tournament titles in Guildford and Chichester. In August that year, she won the South Orange Open singles title beating Lea Antonoplis. In May 1977, she won the doubles title at the Italian Open, partnering compatriot Brigitte Cuypers, and in August, she was a finalist at Canadian Open in Toronto, losing the final in three sets to Regina Maršíková. She partnered with Dianne Fromholtz to win the 1979 Austrian Open doubles, and they reached the semifinals of the doubles at the 1979 French Open.

In 1978, Kruger was a member of the San Francisco Golden Gaters in World Team Tennis (WTT).

Her best singles result at a Grand Slam tournament was reaching the quarterfinals at the 1978 Wimbledon Championships, in which she lost to second-seeded and eventual champion Martina Navratilova.

== Career finals ==
=== Singles: 4 (2 titles, 2 runner-ups) ===
Result	No.	Date	Tournament	Surface	Opponent	Score
Win	1–0	Jun 1976	Chichester, England	Grass	(United States) Bunny Bruning	6–2, 6–2
Loss	1–1	Jun 1976	Beckenham, England	Grass	(Soviet Union) Olga Morozova	5–7, 6–2, 3–6
Win	2–1	Aug 1976	Orange, U.S.	Clay	(United States) Lea Antonoplis	6–3, 6–2
Loss	2–2	Aug 1977	Toronto, Canada	Clay	(Czechoslovakia) Regina Maršíková	4–6, 6–4, 2–6

=== Doubles: 1 (1 title) ===
Result	No.	Date	Tournament	Surface	Partner	Opponent	Score
Win	1–1	May 1977	Rome, Italy	Clay	(South Africa) Brigitte Cuypers	(United States) Bunny Bruning (United States) Sharon Walsh	3–6, 7–5, 6–2
