= Nigel Sears =

British tennis coach (born 1957)

- Country (sports): United Kingdom
- Born: April 4, 1957 (age 68) Watford, Hertfordshire, England
- Height: 6 ft 0 in (183 cm)
- Plays: Right-handed

Singles
- Career titles: 0
- Highest ranking: No. 382 (4 January 1982)

Doubles
- Career titles: 0
- Highest ranking: No. 581 (2 January 1984)

Grand Slam doubles results
- Australian Open: –
- French Open: –
- Wimbledon: –
- US Open: –

Nigel Sears (born 4 April 1957) is a British tennis coach, best known for coaching former top five players Amanda Coetzer, Daniela Hantuchová, Anett Kontaveit and Ana Ivanovic during his long career.

== Playing career ==
Sears reached a career high singles ranking of World No. 382 on 4 January 1982, and a career high doubles ranking of World No. 581 on 2 January 1984. He lost his only professional singles match, but won two of the ten professional doubles matches he played.

== Coaching career ==
Nigel Sears started coaching Slovakia's Daniela Hantuchová in 2001. Under his guidance, Hantuchová reached the world's top ten, won the Indian Wells tournament in California (though that would be her only career title until exactly five years later) and reached three consecutive Grand Slam quarter-finals between the 2002 Wimbledon Championships and the 2003 Australian Open (losing twice to Serena Williams and once to Venus Williams respectively).

At the 2003 French Open, Hantuchová lost a marathon second round match to Ashley Harkleroad in which she made over 100 unforced errors, which led to Sears publicly criticising her attitude. Having reached a career high ranking of World No. 5 earlier in the year, Hantuchová's results continued to deteriorate and by the end of the year she had dropped to No. 17, leading to a decision to temporarily split with Sears.

Sears and Hantuchová reunited in 2004, but on-court results did not improve, as Hantuchová further slipped down to World No. 54 before a late season resurgence saw her finish the season ranked World No. 31 and with an even win–loss record (24 wins and 24 losses).

The pair split permanently in 2006, after which Sears was appointed the captain of the Great Britain Fed Cup team.

In June 2011, Sears was appointed the head coach of former WTA World No. 1 Ana Ivanovic, with a view of reviving her ailing career. Since his appointment, Ivanovic's performances at Grand Slam tournaments improved, and at the 2012 US Open she was finally able to reach her first quarter-final at that level since winning the 2008 French Open.

Sears and Ivanovic parted ways following Wimbledon 2013, in which Ivanovic was defeated in the second round by Eugenie Bouchard.

In July 2015 Sears was reappointed by Ivanovic. During the 2016 Australian Open Sears collapsed in the players box with an allergic reaction whilst watching an Ivanovic match. He was taken to hospital, but released the following morning. He subsequently laid the blame on an allergic reaction to sushi. The partnership ended for a second time with Ivanovic's retirement from tennis in December 2016.

Sears began working with Ekaterina Makarova in the summer of 2017. in June 2018 he began coaching the Estonian player Anett Kontaveit but that arrangement came to an end in April 2021. Sears coached Emma Raducanu in 2021 to the Wimbledon 4th round.

In May 2023 Wang Xiyu hired Nigel Sears as her coach. https://www.wtatennis.com/news/3340269/after-hiring-nigel-sears-wang-xiyu-eager-to-learn-on-the-job

Sears was a regular commentator for BT Sport, who used to cover the WTA in the UK.

== Personal life ==
Sears was born in Watford, Hertfordshire, and now lives elsewhere in the south of England. He is married and has two children. His daughter, Kim, married tennis player Andy Murray in 2015.
