= Wendy Barlow =

Canadian tennis player

Wendy Barlow-Pattenden
Personal information
- Born: Wendy Barlow; March 7, 1960 (age 66) Victoria, British Columbia, Canada
- Education: Brigham Young University

Sport
- Country: Canada
- Sport: Tennis
- Former partner: Nicole Marois

Wendy Barlow-Pattenden (born May 7, 1960) is a Canadian All-American-ranked retired professional tennis player and coach. She played six years of professional tennis, including The Championships, Wimbledon, and was inducted into the Greater Victoria Sports Hall of Fame.

== Playing career ==
She began playing at the age of 10, participating in the Victoria (British Columbia) Parks program.

Barlow won Canadian Junior Tennis Championships in several years, in both singles and doubles. In 1973, she won Girls' 14 doubles with her sister Lori as her partner.

She won Girls' 14 singles and Girls' 14 doubles in 1974. In 1975, she won Girls' 16 singles and Girls' 16 doubles.

At 16, playing under-18, she was ranked #3 in Canada. In 1977 and 1978, Barlow was the Canadian Junior Tennis Champion in the Girls' 18 singles division, and she was ranked 12th internationally in the Girls' 18 singles division.

Barlow was ranked All-American at Brigham Young University in 1978.

Barlow competed at the Wimbledon tennis tournament in 1978 and was defeated in two sets by Helen Cawley of Australia.

In 1979, she lost to Chris Evert at the Dallas Women's Professional Tournament.

Barlow won the Canadian National Championship in 1980, and the number one ranking in Canada.

She represented Canada in three Federation Cup matches, and was the captain of the Canadian Federation Cup team in 1987.

Her career record in the WTA was one win and eight losses.

== Awards and honors ==
Barlow was recognized as the Victoria, BC "Female Athlete-of-the-Year" in 1978, the Tennis Canada "Coach of the Year" in 1986, and was inducted into the Greater Victoria Sports Hall of Fame in 2003.

== Personal ==
Her father, Bob Barlow, played in 77 NHL games with the Minnesota North Stars, accumulating 33 points, and played 51 WHA games with the Phoenix Roadrunners, with 26 points.

Her daughter, Hillary Pattenden, was an ice hockey goaltender with the Mercyhurst Lakers women's ice hockey program and held the NCAA all-time career wins title for 415 days in 2011–2013.
