= Michael Wayman =

British tennis player

- Country (sports): United Kingdom
- Born: 6 May 1953 (age 72) Dulwich, England

Singles
- Career record: 3–13
- Highest ranking: No. 171 (16 Jan 1978)

Grand Slam singles results
- Wimbledon: 2R (1976)

Doubles
- Career record: 3–8

Grand Slam doubles results
- Wimbledon: 2R (1977)

Grand Slam mixed doubles results
- Wimbledon: 1R (1983)

Michael Wayman (born 6 May 1953) is a British former professional tennis player.

Born in Dulwich, England, Wayman played collegiate tennis for the University of Southern California, where he twice earned All-American honors before graduating in 1975.

On the professional tour he registered a best singles ranking of 171 and made the second round of the 1976 Wimbledon Championships. In 1977 he took Australian Open champion Mark Edmondson to five sets in a first round Wimbledon loss and had a win over British Davis Cup player Richard Lewis at a Grand Prix tournament in Brisbane.

Wayman served as head men's tennis coach at Saint Mary's College of California from 1996 to 2015.

== ATP Challenger finals ==
=== Singles: 1 (0–1) ===
Result	No.	Date	Tournament	Surface	Opponent	Score
Loss	1.	Apr 1983	Tokyo, Japan	Hard	(Japan) Tsuyoshi Fukui	4–6, 0–6
