= Andrew Jarrett =

British tennis player (born 1958)

- Country (sports): GBR
- Born: 9 January 1958 (age 67) Belper, Derbyshire, England
- Plays: Right-handed

Singles
- Career record: 13–38
- Career titles: 0
- Highest ranking: No. 140 (1978)

Grand Slam singles results
- Australian Open: 1R (1978, 1981)
- Wimbledon: 2R (1980, 1983)

Doubles
- Career record: 40–46
- Career titles: 1
- Highest ranking: 85 (1983)

Grand Slam doubles results
- Australian Open: SF (1978)
- Wimbledon: 3R (1983)
- US Open: 2R (1980)

Grand Slam mixed doubles results
- Wimbledon: QF (1978)

Andrew Jarrett (born 9 January 1958) is a former professional tennis player from the United Kingdom.

Jarrett was educated at Millfield from 1969 to 1975. He enjoyed most of his tennis success while playing doubles. During his career he won one doubles title. He achieved a career-high doubles ranking of World No. 85 in 1983.

Jarrett was made tournament referee at Wimbledon in 2006 after the retirement of Alan Mills. He held this title until the 2019 Wimbledon Finals after holding the post for 14 years.

For a time, Jarrett was married to former player Debbie Jevans, with whom he played Mixed Doubles at Wimbledon on occasion.

== Career finals ==
=== Doubles (1 title, 5 runner-ups) ===
Result	W/L	Date	Tournament	Surface	Partner	Opponents	Score
Loss	0–1	Jan 1979	Auckland, New Zealand	Hard	(United Kingdom) Jonathan Smith	(South Africa) Bernard Mitton (Australia) Kim Warwick	3–6, 6–2, 3–6
Loss	0–2	Mar 1979	Nancy, France	Hard (i)	(United Kingdom) Robin Drysdale	(West Germany) Klaus Eberhard (West Germany) Karl Meiler	6–4, 6–7, 3–6
Loss	0–3	Sep 1980	Bournemouth, England	Clay	(United Kingdom) Jonathan Smith	(South Africa) Eddie Edwards (United States) Craig Edwards	3–6, 7–6, 6–8
Loss	0–4	Nov 1981	Paris Indoor, France	Hard (i)	(United Kingdom) Jonathan Smith	(Romania) Ilie Năstase (France) Yannick Noah	4–6, 4–6
Loss	0–5	Jan 1982	Adelaide-2, Australia	Grass	(United Kingdom) Jonathan Smith	(Australia) Mark Edmondson (Australia) Kim Warwick	5–7, 6–4, 6–7
Win	1–5	Jan 1982	Auckland, New Zealand	Hard	(United Kingdom) Jonathan Smith	(United States) Larry Stefanki (United States) Robert Van't Hof	7–5, 7–6
