= Jonathan Smith (tennis) =

British tennis player

- Country (sports): Great Britain
- Born: 29 January 1955 (age 71) Exeter, United Kingdom
- Height: 1.88 m (6 ft 2 in)
- Plays: Right-handed
- Prize money: $7,784

Singles
- Career record: 38–73
- Career titles: 0
- Highest ranking: No. 130 (4 January 1981)

Grand Slam singles results
- Australian Open: 3R (1980)
- Wimbledon: 3R (1977)
- US Open: 1R (1981)

Doubles
- Career record: 76–96
- Career titles: 2
- Highest ranking: No. 98 (3 January 1983)

Grand Slam doubles results
- Australian Open: SF (1978)
- French Open: 3R (1985)
- Wimbledon: 3R (1976)
- US Open: 2R (1978)

Jonathan Smith (born 29 January 1955) is a former professional tennis player. He was born in Exeter, England.

Smith enjoyed most of his tennis success while playing doubles. During his career he won 2 doubles titles. He achieved a career-high doubles ranking of world No. 98 in 1983.

== Career finals ==
=== Doubles (2 titles, 5 runner-ups) ===
Result	W-L	Date	Tournament	Surface	Partner	Opponents	Score
Loss	0–1	Jan 1977	Auckland, New Zealand	Grass	(Australia) Peter Langsford	(New Zealand) Chris Lewis (New Zealand) Russell Simpson	6–7, 4–6
Loss	0–2	Jan 1979	Auckland, New Zealand	Hard	(United Kingdom) Andrew Jarrett	(South Africa) Bernard Mitton (Australia) Kim Warwick	3–6, 6–2, 3–6
Loss	0–3	Sep 1980	Bournemouth, UK	Clay	(United Kingdom) Andrew Jarrett	(South Africa) Eddie Edwards (United States) Craig Edwards	3–6, 7–6, 6–8
Loss	0–4	Nov 1981	Paris, France	Hard (i)	(United Kingdom) Andrew Jarrett	(Romania) Ilie Năstase (France) Yannick Noah	4–6, 4–6
Loss	0–5	Jan 1982	Adelaide, Australia	Grass	(United Kingdom) Andrew Jarrett	(Australia) Mark Edmondson (Australia) Kim Warwick	5–7, 6–4, 6–7
Win	1–5	Jan 1982	Auckland, New Zealand	Hard	(United Kingdom) Andrew Jarrett	(United States) Larry Stefanki (United States) Robert Van't Hof	7–5, 7–6
Win	2–5	Dec 1982	Melbourne, Australia	Grass	(South Africa) Eddie Edwards	(Australia) Broderick Dyke (Australia) Wayne Hampson	7–6, 6–3

== Local tournaments ==
=== Singles (3 titles) ===
Result	W-L	Date	Tournament	Surface	Opponent	Score
Win	1.	1975	Exmouth, UK	Grass	(United States) Peter Fisher	7–6, 1–6, 6–3
Win	2.	1977	Guildford, UK	Clay	(United Kingdom) Rohun Beven	6–0, 6–4
Win	3.	1978	Torquay, UK	Carpet (i)	(United Kingdom) John Whiteford	2–6, 7–6, 6–3
