= John Marks (tennis) =

Australian tennis player

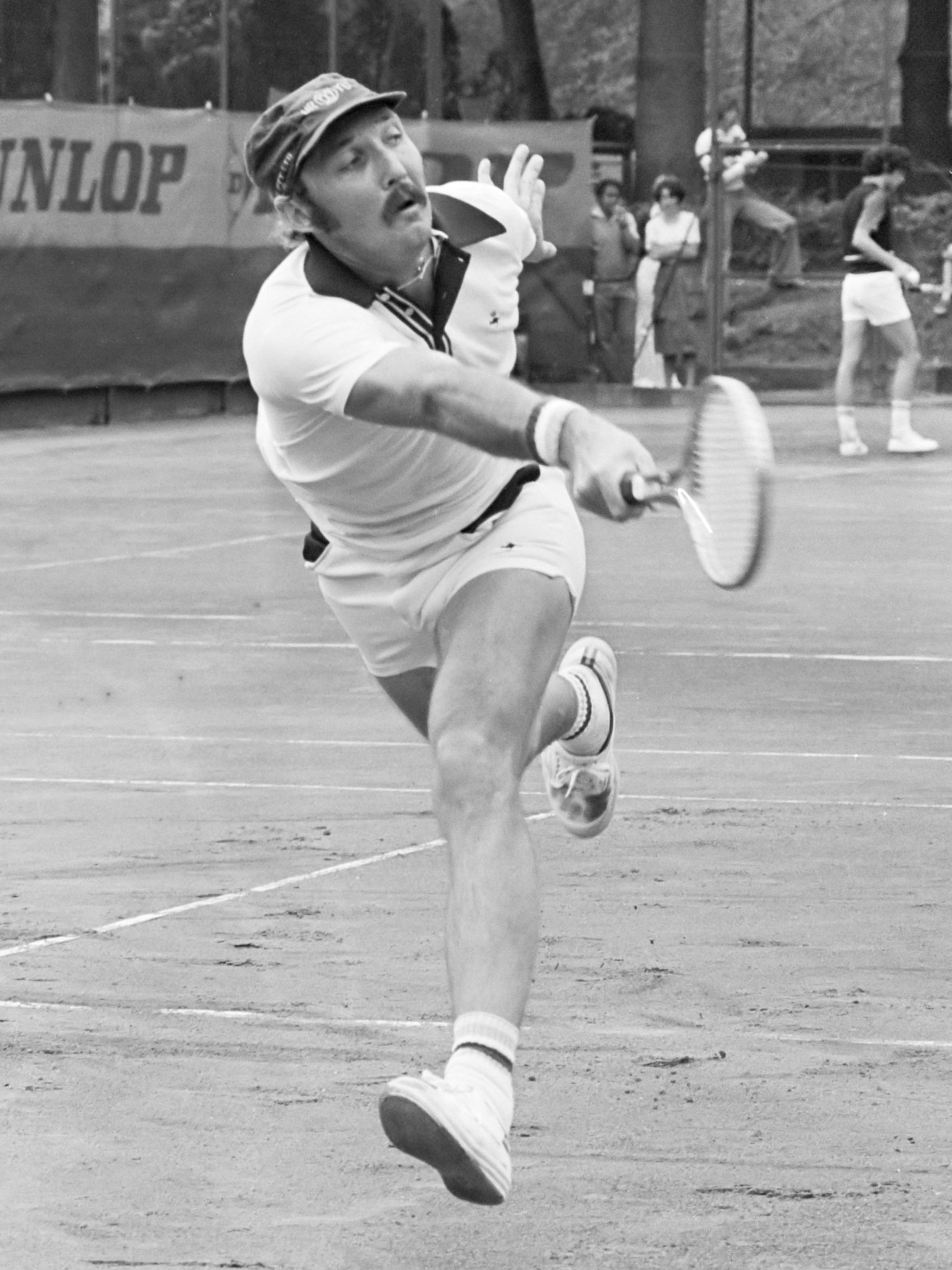
- Full name: John M. P. Marks
- Country (sports): Australia
- Residence: Sydney, Australia
- Born: 9 December 1952 (age 73) Sydney, Australia
- Turned pro: 1975
- Retired: 1980
- Plays: Right-handed (one-handed backhand)

Singles
- Career record: 29–80 (26.6%)
- Career titles: 0
- Highest ranking: No. 44 (3 January 1979)

Grand Slam singles results
- Australian Open: F (1978)
- French Open: 2R (1978)
- Wimbledon: 2R (1978)
- US Open: 1R (1977, 1979)

Doubles
- Career record: 153–103 (59.8%)
- Career titles: 7

Grand Slam doubles results
- Australian Open: 2R (1977^{Dec})
- French Open: QF (1978)
- Wimbledon: QF (1978)
- US Open: SF (1978)

Grand Slam mixed doubles results
- Wimbledon: QF (1979)
Medal record
Summer Universiade
Bronze medal – third place	1973 Moscow	Mixed doubles

John M. P. Marks (born 9 December 1952) is a former professional tennis player from Australia.

Marks won the ILTF Western Australian Championships on grass in 1978 at Perth defeating Mark Edmondson, Chris Kachel, and Bob Carmichael in a marathon five set final. Marks would finish as runner-up in the same event in 1979 losing the final to Edmondson.

Marks is best remembered for finishing runner-up in singles at the 1978 Australian Open, defeating Arthur Ashe in the semifinals. In the final, he lost in four sets to Vilas. "Vilas displayed magnificent court coverage and his adept use of the top spin lob worried Marks." As a result of this slam final appearance, he achieved his career-high singles ranking of world No. 44, after entering the tournament ranked No. 177.

Marks never won a Grand Slam singles title during his career, but won 7 doubles titles and reached the semifinals of the men's doubles at the 1978 US Open. As a junior, Marks won the Australian Open boys' doubles in 1971, partnering Michael Phillips.

== Career finals ==
=== Singles (2 runners-up ) ===
Result	W/L	Date	Tournament	Surface	Opponent	Score
Loss	0–1	Dec 1975	Sydney Outdoor, Australia	Grass	(Australia) Ross Case	2–6, 1–6
Loss	0–2	Jan 1979	Australian Open, Melbourne	Grass	(Argentina) Guillermo Vilas	4–6, 4–6, 6–3, 3–6

=== Doubles (7 titles, 7 runner-ups) ===
Result	W/L	Date	Tournament	Surface	Partner	Opponents	Score
Win	1–0	Dec 1975	Sydney Outdoor, Australia	Grass	(Australia) Mark Edmondson	(Australia) Chris Kachel (Australia) Peter McNamara	6–1, 6–1
Loss	1–1	Apr 1976	Palma, Spain	Clay	(Australia) Mark Edmondson	(United States) John Andrews (Australia) Colin Dibley	6–2, 3–6, 2–6
Loss	1–2	Dec 1976	Sydney Outdoor, Australia	Grass	(Australia) Mark Edmondson	(Australia) Syd Ball (Australia) Kim Warwick	3–6, 4–6
Win	2–2	Mar 1977	Cairo, Egypt	Clay	(Australia) John Bartlett	(United States) Pat DuPré (United Kingdom) Chris Lewis	7–5, 6–1, 6–3
Win	3–2	Jul 1977	Båstad, Sweden	Clay	(Australia) Mark Edmondson	(France) Jean-Louis Haillet (France) François Jauffret	6–4, 6–0
Win	4–2	Nov 1977	Manila, Philippines	Hard	(Australia) Chris Kachel	(United States) Mike Cahill (United States) Terry Moor	4–6, 6–0, 7–6
Loss	4–3	May 1978	Florence, Italy	Clay	(Australia) Mark Edmondson	(Italy) Corrado Barazzutti (Italy) Adriano Panatta	3–6, 7–6, 3–6
Loss	4–4	Oct 1978	Sydney Indoor, Australia	Hard (i)	(Australia) Mark Edmondson	(Australia) John Newcombe (Australia) Tony Roche	4–6, 3–6
Win	5–4	Nov 1978	Hong Kong	Hard	(Australia) Mark Edmondson	(United States) Hank Pfister (United States) Brad Rowe	5–7, 7–6, 6–1
Loss	5–5	Nov 1978	Taipei, Taiwan	Carpet (i)	(Australia) Mark Edmondson	(United States) Sherwood Stewart (United States) Butch Walts	2–6, 7–6, 6–7
Loss	5–6	May 1979	Hamburg, Germany	Clay	(Australia) Mark Edmondson	(Czechoslovakia) Jan Kodeš (Czechoslovakia) Tomáš Šmíd	3–6, 1–6, 6–7
Win	6–6	Jul 1979	Gstaad, Switzerland	Clay	(Australia) Mark Edmondson	(Romania) Ion Țiriac (Argentina) Guillermo Vilas	2–6, 6–1, 6–4
Loss	6–7	Jul 1979	Båstad, Sweden	Clay	(Australia) Mark Edmondson	(Switzerland) Heinz Günthardt (South Africa) Bob Hewitt	2–6, 2–6
Win	7–7	Nov 1979	Taipei, Taiwan	Carpet (i)	(Australia) Mark Edmondson	(United States) Pat DuPré (United States) Robert Lutz	6–1, 3–6, 6–4

== Grand Slam tournament performance timeline ==
Key
W	F	SF	QF	#R	RR	Q#	DNQ	A	NH

(W) winner; (F) finalist; (SF) semifinalist; (QF) quarterfinalist; (#R) rounds 4, 3, 2, 1; (RR) round-robin stage; (Q#) qualification round; (DNQ) did not qualify; (A) absent; (NH) not held; (SR) strike rate (events won / competed); (W–L) win–loss record.

=== Singles ===
Tournament	1976	1977		1978	1979	1980	SR
Australian Open	1R	1R	1R	F	1R	Q1	0 / 5
French Open	A	A		2R	1R	A	0 / 2
Wimbledon	1R	1R		2R	1R	Q1	0 / 4
US Open	A	1R		A	1R	A	0 / 2
Strike rate	0 / 2	0 / 4		0 / 3	0 / 4	0 / 0	0 / 13

Note: The Australian Open was held twice in 1977, in January and December.
