= 1978 Wimbledon Championships =

- Date: 26 June – 8 July
- Edition: 92nd
- Category: Grand Slam
- Draw: 128S/64D/52XD
- Prize money: £279,023
- Surface: Grass
- Location: Church Road; SW19, Wimbledon, London, United Kingdom
- Venue: All England Lawn Tennis and Croquet Club

Champions

Men's singles
- (Sweden) Björn Borg

Women's singles
- (United States) Martina Navratilova

Men's doubles
- (South Africa) Bob Hewitt / (South Africa) Frew McMillan

Women's doubles
- (Australia) Kerry Reid / (Australia) Wendy Turnbull

Mixed doubles
- (South Africa) Frew McMillan / (Netherlands) Betty Stöve

Boys' singles
- (Czechoslovakia) Ivan Lendl

Girls' singles
- (United States) Tracy Austin
| ← 1977 · | Wimbledon Championships | · 1979 → |

The 1978 Wimbledon Championships was a tennis tournament that took place on the outdoor grass courts at the All England Lawn Tennis and Croquet Club in Wimbledon, London, United Kingdom. The tournament ran from 26 June until 8 July. It was the 92nd staging of the Wimbledon Championships, and the second Grand Slam tennis event of 1978.

== Prize money ==
The total prize money for 1978 championships was £279,023. The winner of the men's title earned £19,000 while the women's singles champion earned £17,100.

| Event | W | F | SF | QF | Round of 16 | Round of 32 | Round of 64 | Round of 128 |
| Men's singles | £19,000 | £9,600 | £4,800 | £2,400 | £1,440 | £720 | £350 | £200 |
| Women's singles | £17,100 | £8,400 | £4,200 | £1,920 | £1,100 | £552 | £324 | £188 |
| Men's doubles * | £7,500 | £3,600 | £2,000 | £1,000 | £500 | £160 | £75 | — |
| Women's doubles * | £6,500 | £3,120 | £1,600 | £800 | £350 | £110 | £50 | — |
| Mixed doubles * | £4,000 | £2,000 | £840 | £480 | £240 | £0 | £0 | — |

_{* per team}

== Champions ==
=== Seniors ===
==== Men's singles ====
(Sweden) Björn Borg defeated (United States) Jimmy Connors, 6–2, 6–2, 6–3

==== Women's singles ====
(United States) Martina Navratilova defeated (United States) Chris Evert, 2–6, 6–4, 7–5

It was Navratilova's 1st Grand Slam singles title.

==== Men's doubles ====
(South Africa) Bob Hewitt / (South Africa) Frew McMillan defeated (United States) John McEnroe / (United States) Peter Fleming, 6–1, 6–4, 6–2

==== Women's doubles ====
(Australia) Kerry Reid / (Australia) Wendy Turnbull defeated (Socialist Federal Republic of Yugoslavia) Mima Jaušovec / (Romania) Virginia Ruzici, 4–6, 9–8^{(12–10)}, 6–3

==== Mixed doubles ====
(South Africa) Frew McMillan / (Netherlands) Betty Stöve defeated (Australia) Ray Ruffels / (United States) Billie Jean King, 6–2, 6–2

=== Juniors ===
==== Boys' singles ====
(Czechoslovakia) Ivan Lendl defeated (United States) Jeff Turpin, 6–3, 6–4

==== Girls' singles ====
(United States) Tracy Austin defeated (Czechoslovakia) Hana Mandlíková, 6–0, 3–6, 6–4

== Singles seeds ==
=== Men's singles ===
1. (Sweden) Björn Borg (champion)
2. (United States) Jimmy Connors (final, lost to Björn Borg)
3. (United States) Vitas Gerulaitis (semifinals, lost to Jimmy Connors)
4. (Argentina) Guillermo Vilas (third round, lost to Tom Okker)
5. (United States) Brian Gottfried (quarterfinals, lost to Vitas Gerulaitis)
6. (United States) Roscoe Tanner (fourth round, lost to Ilie Năstase)
7. (Mexico) Raúl Ramírez (quarterfinals, lost to Jimmy Connors)
8. (United States) Sandy Mayer (quarterfinals, lost to Björn Borg)
9. (Romania) Ilie Năstase (quarterfinals, lost to Tom Okker)
10. (United States) Dick Stockton (first round, lost to John Marks)
11. (United States) John McEnroe (first round, lost to Erik van Dillen)
12. (United Kingdom) Buster Mottram (second round, lost to Frew McMillan)
13. (Poland) Wojciech Fibak (fourth round, lost to Sandy Mayer)
14. (Australia) John Alexander (fourth round, lost to Jimmy Connors)
15. (United States) Arthur Ashe (first round, lost to Steve Docherty)
16. (Australia) John Newcombe (fourth round, lost to Raúl Ramírez)

=== Women's singles ===
1. (United States) Chris Evert (final, lost to Martina Navratilova)
2. (United States) Martina Navratilova (champion)
3. (Australia) Evonne Goolagong Cawley (semifinals, lost to Martina Navratilova)
4. (United Kingdom) Virginia Wade (semifinals, lost to Chris Evert)
5. (United States) Billie Jean King (quarterfinals, lost to Chris Evert)
6. (Netherlands) Betty Stöve (fourth round, lost to Virginia Ruzici)
7. (Australia) Wendy Turnbull (fourth round, lost to Mima Jaušovec)
8. (Australia) Dianne Fromholtz (fourth round, lost to Marise Kruger)
9. (United States) Tracy Austin (fourth round, lost to Martina Navratilova)
10. (Australia) Kerry Reid (fourth round, lost to Chris Evert)
11. (South Africa) Marise Kruger (quarterfinals, lost to Martina Navratilova)
12. (Socialist Federal Republic of Yugoslavia) Mima Jaušovec (quarterfinals, lost to Virginia Wade)
13. (Romania) Virginia Ruzici (quarterfinals, lost to Evonne Goolagong Cawley)
14. (United Kingdom) Sue Barker (fourth round, lost to Billie Jean King)
15. (Czechoslovakia) Regina Maršíková (fourth round, lost to Evonne Goolagong Cawley)
16. (United States) Marita Redondo (third round, lost to Ruta Gerulaitis)

| Preceded by 1978 French Open | Grand Slams | Succeeded by 1978 US Open |
