= Dale Collings =

Australian tennis player

- Country (sports): Australia
- Born: 16 December 1955 (age 70) Southport, Queensland, Australia
- Plays: Right-handed

Singles
- Career record: 23–42
- Career titles: 0
- Highest ranking: No. 101 (26 Dec 1979)

Grand Slam singles results
- Australian Open: 3R (1978, 1982)
- Wimbledon: 2R (1976)
- US Open: 1R (1978)

Doubles
- Career record: 26–42
- Career titles: 0

Grand Slam doubles results
- Australian Open: 2R (1980, 1981, 1982)
- Wimbledon: 3R (1978)
- US Open: 1R (1978)

Dale Collings (born 16 December 1955) is a former professional tennis player from Australia.

== Career ==
Collings, who was known for his fast serves, won the Wimbledon Plate in 1978. He twice made the third round of the Australian Open, in 1978 and 1982. The Australian also reached the third round of the men's doubles at the 1978 Wimbledon Championships (with Keith Hancock) and mixed doubles at the 1981 Wimbledon Championships (with Karen Gulley).

He was a quarter-finalist at the Sydney Indoor tournament in 1979, beating Ken Rosewall and Geoff Masters along the way. He made another quarter-final in Adelaide that year and reached the semi-finals at Brisbane in 1980.

With partner Dick Crealy, Collings was a doubles runner-up at the Perth Grand Prix event in 1980. He made doubles semi-finals at Auckland in 1977, Cleveland in 1979, Adelaide in 1979, the Sydney Outdoor in 1979 and again at Auckland in 1980.

== Grand Prix career finals ==
=== Doubles: 1 (0–1) ===
Result	W/L	Date	Tournament	Surface	Partner	Opponents	Score
Loss	0–1	Jan 1980	Perth, Australia	Grass	(Australia) Dick Crealy	(Australia) Syd Ball (Australia) Cliff Letcher	3–6, 4–6
