= 1980 Robinsons South Pacific Classic – Doubles =

Doubles
- 1980 Robinsons South Pacific Classic

Final
- Champion: (United States) John McEnroe (Australia) Rod Frawley
- Runner-up: (Australia) Phil Dent (Australia) Rod Frawley
- Score: 8–6 (Note: Players agreed to play a single pro-set due to failing light conditions and commitments to participate in the subsequent Australian Indoor Championships.)

Details
- Draw: 16
- Seeds: 4

Events
Singles	Doubles
- South Pacific Tennis Classic

The 1980 Robinsons South Pacific Classic – Doubles was an event of the 1980 Robinsons South Pacific Classic tennis tournament and was played on outdoor grass courts at the Milton Courts in Brisbane, Queensland, Australia, between 6 October and 12 October 1980. The draw comprised 16 teams players of which 4 were seeded. Geoff Masters and Ross Case were the defending South Pacific Tennis Classic doubles champions but did not participate in this edition. The unseeded team of John McEnroe and Matt Mitchell won the doubles title by defeating second-seeded Phil Dent and Rod Frawley in the final, 8–6.

== Seeds ==
1. (Australia) Mark Edmondson / (Australia) Kim Warwick (Semifinals)
2. (Australia) Phil Dent / (Australia) Rod Frawley (Final)
3. (Australia) Syd Ball / (Australia) Cliff Letcher (Quarterfinals)
4. (Australia) Chris Kachel / (Australia) John Marks (First round)

== Draw ==
Key

- Q = Qualifier
- WC = Wild card
- LL = Lucky loser
- Alt = Alternate
- ITF = ITF entry
- PR = Protected ranking
- SR = Special ranking
- SE = Special exempt
- JE = Junior exempt
- JR = Junior Accelerator Programme entrant
- CO = College Accelerator Programme entrant
- NG = Next Gen Accelerator Program entrant
- w/o = Walkover
- r = Retired
- d = Defaulted

First Round
1	(Australia) Mark Edmondson (Australia) Kim Warwick	7	7
(United States) Tom Gullikson (United States) John Whitlinger	6	6
(Australia) Ernie Ewert (Australia) Brad Guan	7	2	6
(Australia) Dale Collings (Australia) Wayne Hampson	6	6	3
(United States) John McEnroe (United States) Matt Mitchell	4	6	6
4	(Australia) Chris Kachel (Australia) John Marks	6	3	4
(United States) Andy Kohlberg (United States) Richard Meyer	4	6	7
(Australia) Philip Davies (Australia) John Trickey	6	2	5
(Austria) Peter Feigl (India) Sashi Menon	7	2	6
(United States) Chris Delaney (United States) Jeremy Cohen	6	6	0
3	(Australia) Syd Ball (Australia) Cliff Letcher	7	2	6
(Australia) John Fitzgerald (Australia) Wayne Pascoe	6	6	3
(Australia) Charlie Fancutt (Germany) Ulrich Marten	6	6
(Australia) Peter Johnston (Australia) Greg Whitecross	3	4
(Australia) Brad Drewett (Australia) Terry Rocavert	2	1
2	(Australia) Phil Dent (Australia) Rod Frawley	6	6

Quarterfinals
1	(Australia) Mark Edmondson (Australia) Kim Warwick	6	7
(Australia) Ernie Ewert (Australia) Brad Guan	4	6
(United States) John McEnroe (United States) Matt Mitchell	6	6
(United States) Andy Kohlberg (United States) Richard Meyer	4	1
(Austria) Peter Feigl (India) Sashi Menon	4	6	6
3	(Australia) Syd Ball (Australia) Cliff Letcher	6	1	2
(Australia) Charlie Fancutt (Germany) Ulrich Marten	4	6
2	(Australia) Phil Dent (Australia) Rod Frawley	6	7

Semifinals
1	(Australia) Mark Edmondson (Australia) Kim Warwick	7	2	4
(United States) John McEnroe (United States) Matt Mitchell	5	6	6
(Austria) Peter Feigl (India) Sashi Menon	6	6
2	(Australia) Phil Dent (Australia) Rod Frawley	7	7

Final
(United States) John McEnroe (United States) Matt Mitchell	8
2	(Australia) Phil Dent (Australia) Rod Frawley	6
