= 1980 Australian Hard Court Championships – Singles =

Singles
- 1980 Australian Hard Court Championships

Final
- Champion: (Israel) Shlomo Glickstein
- Runner-up: (United States) Robert Van't Hof
- Score: 7–6, 6–4

Details
- Draw: 32 (4Q)
- Seeds: 8

Events
Singles	Doubles
← 1979 ·	Australian Hard Court Championships	· 1988 →

Guillermo Vilas, the defending champion, was still competing at the Australian Open, eventually winning the title.

Shlomo Glickstein won the title by defeating Robert Van't Hof 7–6, 6–4 in the final.

== Seeds ==
1. (United States) Hank Pfister (second round)
2. (n/a)
3. (Australia) Chris Kachel (quarterfinals)
4. (Australia) Mark Edmondson (second round)
5. (Australia) Brad Drewett (first round)
6. (South Africa) Raymond Moore (quarterfinals)
7. (Australia) Paul Kronk (second round)
8. (Australia) John Marks (quarterfinals)

== Draw ==
=== Key ===
- Q = Qualifier
- WC = Wild card
- LL = Lucky loser
- Alt = Alternate
- SE = Special exempt
- PR = Protected ranking
- ITF = ITF entry
- JE = Junior exempt
- w/o = Walkover
- r = Retired
- d = Defaulted
- SR = Special ranking

=== Finals ===
Semifinals
(Australia) Terry Rocavert	6	4	2
(Israel) Shlomo Glickstein	1	6	6
(United States) Robert Van't Hof	7	6
(United States) Rick Fisher	6	3

Final
(Israel) Shlomo Glickstein	7	6
(United States) Robert Van't Hof	6	4

=== Top half ===
First round
1	(United States) H Pfister	5	6	6
Q	(Australia) J Fitzgerald	7	3	4
(United States) G Petrovic	6	5
(Australia) T Rocavert	7	7
(Australia) C Letcher	2	3
(United States) J Cohen	6	6
Q	(Australia) B Guan	3	7	3
6	(South Africa) R Moore	6	5	6
4	(Australia) M Edmondson	6	6
(Australia) G Whitecross	3	3
(Israel) S Glickstein	6	6
(Australia) P Campbell	2	2
(United States) D Siegler	2	6	2
(United Kingdom) R Beven	6	1	6
(Australia) W Maher	2	4
8	(Australia) J Marks	6	6

Second round
1	(United States) H Pfister	4	1
(Australia) T Rocavert	6	6
(United States) J Cohen	3	1
6	(South Africa) R Moore	6	6
4	(Australia) M Edmondson	7	3	4
(Israel) S Glickstein	6	6	6
(United Kingdom) R Beven	1	6	4
8	(Australia) J Marks	6	4	6

Quarterfinals
(Australia) T Rocavert	6	6
6	(South Africa) R Moore	3	2
(Israel) S Glickstein	6	3	6
8	(Australia) J Marks	4	6	2

Semifinals
(Australia) T Rocavert	6	4	2
(Israel) S Glickstein	1	6	6

=== Bottom half ===
First round
5	(Australia) B Drewett	6	6	4
(United States) C Delaney	7	3	6
(Australia) E Ewert	6	1	2
(United States) R Van't Hof	3	6	6
Q	(Australia) W Hampson	6	7
(Australia) J James	4	6
(United States) H Fritz	5	0
3	(Australia) C Kachel	7	6
7	(Australia) P Kronk	6	4	6
Q	(Australia) P Davies	3	6	1
(Australia) S Ball	7	6
(Australia) C Fancutt	6	4
(United States) R Fisher	7	6
(United States) B Maze	5	4
(Australia) C Johnstone	2	6	4
(Australia) W Pascoe	6	3	6

Second round
(United States) C Delaney	6	3
(United States) R Van't Hof	7	6
Q	(Australia) W Hampson	6	4
3	(Australia) C Kachel	7	6
7	(Australia) P Kronk	2	6
(Australia) S Ball	6	7
(United States) R Fisher	7	6
(Australia) W Pascoe	5	3

Quarterfinals
(United States) R Van't Hof	7	6
3	(Australia) C Kachel	6	1
(Australia) S Ball	4	4
(United States) R Fisher	6	6

Semifinals
(United States) R Van't Hof	7	6
(United States) R Fisher	6	3
