= 1977 Marlboro South Australian Men's Tennis Classic – Singles =

Singles
- 1977 Marlboro South Australian Men's Tennis Classic

Final
- Champion: (United States) Victor Amaya
- Runner-up: (United States) Brian Teacher
- Score: 6–1, 6–4

Details
- Draw: 48
- Seeds: 8

Events
| Singles | Doubles |
- South Australian Championships

The event was being held for the first time since 1974.

Victor Amaya won the title, defeating Brian Teacher 6–1, 6–4 in the final.

== Seeds ==
1. (United States) Roscoe Tanner (second round)
2. (United States) Arthur Ashe (second round)
3. (Australia) Ray Ruffels (first round)
4. (United States) Dick Stockton (quarterfinals)
5. (Australia) Mark Edmondson (second round)
6. (Australia) Ross Case (second round)
7. N/A
8. (Australia) Phil Dent (second round)

== Draw ==
Key

- Q = Qualifier
- WC = Wild card
- LL = Lucky loser
- Alt = Alternate
- ITF = ITF entry
- PR = Protected ranking
- SR = Special ranking
- SE = Special exempt
- JE = Junior exempt
- JR = Junior Accelerator Programme entrant
- CO = College Accelerator Programme entrant
- NG = Next Gen Accelerator Program entrant
- w/o = Walkover
- r = Retired
- d = Defaulted

=== Finals ===
Semifinals
(Australia) John Alexander | 4 | 4
(United States) Victor Amaya | 6 | 6
(United States) Brian Teacher | 3 | 7 | 6
(United States) Charlie Pasarell | 6 | 6 | 4

Final
(United States) Victor Amaya | 6 | 6
(United States) Brian Teacher | 1 | 4

=== Top half ===
==== Section 1 ====
First round
1 | (United States) R Tanner | 7 | 6
(United States) D Bohrnstedt | 5 | 3
(Australia) J Alexander | 6 | 6
Q | (Australia) G Thomson | 3 | 4
(West Germany) R Gehring | 7 | 4 | 6
(Australia) S Ball | 6 | 6 | 3
(West Germany) U Marten | 6 | 7
(United Kingdom) R Drysdale | 4 | 6

Second round
1 | (United States) R Tanner | 3 | 4
(United States) T Gorman | 6 | 6
(Australia) C Letcher | 3 | 0
(Australia) J Alexander | 6 | 6
(West Germany) R Gehring | 6 | 5 | 6
(United States) M Riessen | 4 | 7 | 4
(West Germany) U Marten | 6 | 7
(United States) Mark Meyers | 3 | 5

Third round
(United States) T Gorman | 4 | 4
(Australia) J Alexander | 6 | 6
(West Germany) R Gehring | 6 | 3
(West Germany) U Marten | 3 | 0^{r}

Quarterfinals
(Australia) J Alexander | 6 | 6
(West Germany) R Gehring | 1 | 3

==== Section 2 ====
First round
3 | (Australia) R Ruffels | 4 | 6 | 4
(United States) H Pfister | 6 | 4 | 6
(Australia) G Masters | 6 | 6
(Australia) A Gardiner | 4 | 0
(United States) E van Dillen | 7 | 6
(Australia) Noel Jensen | 6 | 1
(Australia) C Dibley | 6 | 6
(Australia) B Drewett | 4 | 1

Second round
(United States) H Pfister | 1 | 6 | 8
(United States) V Amaya | 6 | 3 | 10
(Australia) G Masters | 5 | 7 | 6
Q | (Australia) T Little | 7 | 6 | 4
6 | (Australia) R Case | 4 | 6
(United States) E van Dillen | 6 | 7
(Australia) C Dibley | 6 | 6
(Australia) Ronald Russo | 4 | 2

Third round
(United States) V Amaya | 6 | 7
(Australia) G Masters | 4 | 6
(United States) E van Dillen | 4 | 2
(Australia) C Dibley | 6 | 6

Quarterfinals
(United States) V Amaya | 6 | 6 | 6
(Australia) C Dibley | 3 | 7 | 3

=== Bottom half ===
==== Section 3 ====
First round
(Australia) W Pascoe | 4 | 7 | 6
(United States) J Hagey | 6 | 6 | 4
(United Kingdom) J Feaver | 1 | 2
5 | (Australia) M Edmondson | 6 | 6
(Australia) W Maher | 3 | 4
(Australia) A Stone | 6 | 6
Q | (West Germany) P Elter | 4 | 4
4 | (United States) D Stockton | 6 | 6

Second round
(Australia) W Pascoe | 6 | 6
(Australia) C Fancutt | 7 | 7
(United States) B Teacher | 5 | 6 | 6
5 | (Australia) M Edmondson | 7 | 4 | 2
(Australia) A Stone | 6 | 6
(Australia) B Carmichael | 1 | 4
(Australia) J Bartlett | 5 | 6 | 4
4 | (United States) D Stockton | 7 | 3 | 6

Third round
(Australia) C Fancutt | 6 | 1 | 4
(United States) B Teacher | 3 | 6 | 6
(Australia) A Stone | 3 | 5
4 | (United States) D Stockton | 6 | 7

Quarterfinals
(United States) B Teacher | 7 | 7
4 | (United States) D Stockton | 6 | 6

==== Section 4 ====
First round
Q | (Australia) D Carter | 3 | 3
(West Germany) K Eberhard | 6 | 6
(Australia) J James | 5 | 3
8 | (Australia) P Dent | 7 | 6
(Australia) B Phillips-Moore | 4 | 6 | 2
(Australia) C Kachel | 6 | 4 | 6
Q | (Australia) T Rocavert | 6 | 3
(United States) C Pasarell | 7 | 6

Second round
(Australia) J Marks | 6 | 6
(West Germany) K Eberhard | 3 | 4
(United States) S Stewart | 6 | 6
8 | (Australia) P Dent | 4 | 4
(Australia) K Warwick | 6 | 5 | 0^{r}
(Australia) C Kachel | 3 | 7 | 4
(United States) C Pasarell | 7 | 6 | 6
2 | (United States) A Ashe | 6 | 7 | 3

Third round
(Australia) J Marks | 0 | 2
(United States) S Stewart | 6 | 6
(Australia) C Kachel | 4 | 2
(United States) C Pasarell | 6 | 6

Quarterfinals
(United States) S Stewart | 7 | 3 | 2
(United States) C Pasarell | 6 | 6 | 6
