= 1974 South Pacific Championships – Doubles =

Doubles
- 1974 South Pacific Championships

Final
- Champions: (United States) Raz Reid (Australia) Allan Stone
- Runners-up: (United States) Mike Estep (Australia) Paul Kronk
- Score: 7–6, 6–4

Details
- Draw: 16

Events
Singles	Doubles
South Pacific Tennis Classic	· 1975 →

Raz Reid and Allan Stone won the title, defeating Mike Estep and Paul Kronk 7–6, 6–4 in the final.

== Draw ==
=== Key ===
- Q = Qualifier
- WC = Wild card
- LL = Lucky loser
- Alt = Alternate
- ITF = ITF entry
- PR = Protected ranking
- SR = Special ranking
- SE = Special exempt
- JE = Junior exempt
- JR = Junior Accelerator Programme entrant
- CO = College Accelerator Programme entrant
- NG = Next Gen Accelerator Program entrant
- w/o = Walkover
- r = Retired
- d = Defaulted

=== Draw ===
First round
(Australia) J Newcombe (United States) D Stockton	8
(Australia) Wayne Cowley (Australia) Stephen Myers	4
(Australia) K Hiskins (Australia) John Stephens	6	4
(Australia) N Fraser (Australia) P McNamara	7	6
(United States) R Reid (Australia) A Stone	6	7
(Australia) W Coghlan (Australia) C Stubs	3	5
(Australia) E Ewert (Australia) C Kachel	4	7	6
(United States) D Dell (United States) S Stewart	6	6	1
(United States) M Estep (Australia) P Kronk	6	1	9
(Australia) W Durham (Australia) C Letcher	3	6	7
(Australia) B Carmichael (Australia) P Dent	6	3	6
(Australia) K Coombes (United States) S Segura	3	6	2
(United States) J Austin (United States) F McNair	5	7	8
(Australia) T Little (Australia) J Trickey	7	6	6
(Australia) B Giltinan (Australia) G Masters	8
(Australia) P Doerner (Australia) G Thomson	6

Quarterfinals
(Australia) J Newcombe (United States) D Stockton
(Australia) N Fraser (Australia) P McNamara	w/o
(United States) R Reid (Australia) A Stone	10
(Australia) E Ewert (Australia) C Kachel	8
(United States) M Estep (Australia) P Kronk	8
(Australia) B Carmichael (Australia) P Dent	6
(United States) J Austin (United States) F McNair	8
(Australia) B Giltinan (Australia) G Masters	6

Semifinals
(Australia) N Fraser (Australia) P McNamara	3	6	3
(United States) R Reid (Australia) A Stone	6	4	6
(United States) M Estep (Australia) P Kronk	6	7
(United States) J Austin (United States) F McNair	2	5

Final
(United States) R Reid (Australia) A Stone	7	6
(United States) M Estep (Australia) P Kronk	6	4
