= 1980 Robinsons South Pacific Classic – Singles =

Singles
- 1980 Robinsons South Pacific Classic

Final
- Champion: (United States) John McEnroe
- Runner-up: (United States) Roscoe Tanner
- Score: 3–6, 7–5, 6–3

Details
- Draw: 32
- Seeds: 16

Events
Singles	Doubles
- South Pacific Tennis Classic

The 1980 Robinsons South Pacific Classic – Singles was an event of the 1980 Robinsons South Pacific Classic tennis tournament and was played on outdoor grass courts at the Milton Courts in Brisbane, Queensland, Australia, between 6 October and 12 October 1980. The draw comprised 32 players of which 16 were seeded. Phil Dent was the defending South Pacific Tennis Classic singles champion but lost in the final. First-seeded John McEnroe won the title by defeating second-seeded Dent in the final, 4–6, 6–1, 6–4.

== Seeds ==
1. (United States) John McEnroe (champion)
2. (Australia) Phil Dent (final)
3. (Australia) Kim Warwick (first round)
4. (Australia) Rod Frawley (semifinals)
5. (Australia) Mark Edmondson (quarterfinals)
6. (Austria) Peter Feigl (second round)
7. (Australia) Geoff Masters (first round)
8. (United States) Chris Delaney (quarterfinals)

== Draw ==
Key

- Q = Qualifier
- WC = Wild card
- LL = Lucky loser
- Alt = Alternate
- ITF = ITF entry
- PR = Protected ranking
- SR = Special ranking
- SE = Special exempt
- JE = Junior exempt
- JR = Junior Accelerator Programme entrant
- CO = College Accelerator Programme entrant
- NG = Next Gen Accelerator Program entrant
- w/o = Walkover
- r = Retired
- d = Defaulted

=== Finals ===
Semifinals
1	(United States) John McEnroe	4	6	6
4	(Australia) Rod Frawley	6	1	4
(Australia) Dale Collings	1	0
2	(Australia) Phil Dent	6	6

Final
1	(United States) John McEnroe	6	6
2	(Australia) Phil Dent	3	4

=== Top half ===
First Round
1	(United States) John McEnroe	6	6
(United States) Matt Mitchell	3	1
(United States) Andy Kohlberg	6	6
(Australia) Charlie Fancutt	3	3
(Australia) Syd Ball	6	6
(India) Sashi Menon	3	3
(Australia) Greg Whitecross	3	5
8	(United States) Chris Delaney	6	7
4	(Australia) Rod Frawley	6	6
(United States) Tom Gullikson	4	2
(Australia) Chris Johnstone	1	7	6
Q	(Canada) Brian Millar	6	6	1
(Australia) Ken Rosewall	1	7	6
(Australia) John Fitzgerald	6	5	3
Q	(Australia) Alvin Gardiner	6	1	2
5	(Australia) Mark Edmondson	4	6	6

Second Round
1	(United States) John McEnroe	6	6
(United States) Andy Kohlberg	4	2
(Australia) Syd Ball	1	6	3
8	(United States) Chris Delaney	6	3	6
4	(Australia) Rod Frawley	3	6	6
(Australia) Chris Johnstone	6	1	3
(Australia) Ken Rosewall	6	2	2
5	(Australia) Mark Edmondson	3	6	6

Quarterfinals
1	(United States) John McEnroe	6	6
8	(United States) Chris Delaney	1	1
4	(Australia) Rod Frawley	5	7	6
5	(Australia) Mark Edmondson	7	6	3

Semifinals
1	(United States) John McEnroe	4	6	6
4	(Australia) Rod Frawley	6	1	4

=== Bottom half ===
First Round
7	(Australia) Geoff Masters	3	0
(Australia) Terry Rocavert	6	6
(Australia) Dale Collings	7	6
(Germany) Ulrich Marten	6	2
(Australia) Cliff Letcher	6	6
Q	(Australia) Chris Kachel	3	1
(United States) Richard Meyer	6	7	7
3	(Australia) Kim Warwick	7	6	6
6	(Austria) Peter Feigl	6	6
(Australia) John Marks	1	4
(Australia) Tony Roche	7	6
Q	(United States) Junie Chatman	5	4
(Australia) Brad Drewett	6	6
(Australia) Wayne Hampson	0	3
(Australia) Wayne Pascoe	2	4
2	(Australia) Phil Dent	6	6

Second Round
(Australia) Terry Rocavert	3	4
(Australia) Dale Collings	6	6
(Australia) Cliff Letcher	4	4
(United States) Richard Meyer	6	6
6	(Austria) Peter Feigl	3	1
(Australia) Tony Roche	6	6
(Australia) Brad Drewett	1	3
2	(Australia) Phil Dent	6	6

Quarterfinals
(Australia) Dale Collings	7	7
(United States) Richard Meyer	5	6
(Australia) Tony Roche	7	3	2
2	(Australia) Phil Dent	5	6	6

Semifinals
(Australia) Dale Collings	1	0
2	(Australia) Phil Dent	6	6
