= Philippines Open International Championships =

Defunct tennis tournament
- Tour: ILTF World Circuit (1936–69); ILTF Independent Tour (1970-72) men Grand Prix Circuit (1973-78) men
- Founded: 1918; 108 years ago
- Abolished: 1978; 48 years ago
- Location: Manila, Philippines
- Venue: Rizal Memorial Tennis Center
- Surface: Clay outdoors Hard outdoors

The Philippines Open International Championships and later known as PHILTA International Championships or simply the Philippines Open was an international men's and women's clay then later court tennis tournament founded in 1918 as the Philippine Championships . It was first organised by the Philippine Tennis Association (PhilTA) and first played at the Rizal Memorial Tennis Center, Manila, Philippines. This international tournament was part of the ILTF World Circuit until 1978 when it was discontinued.

== History ==
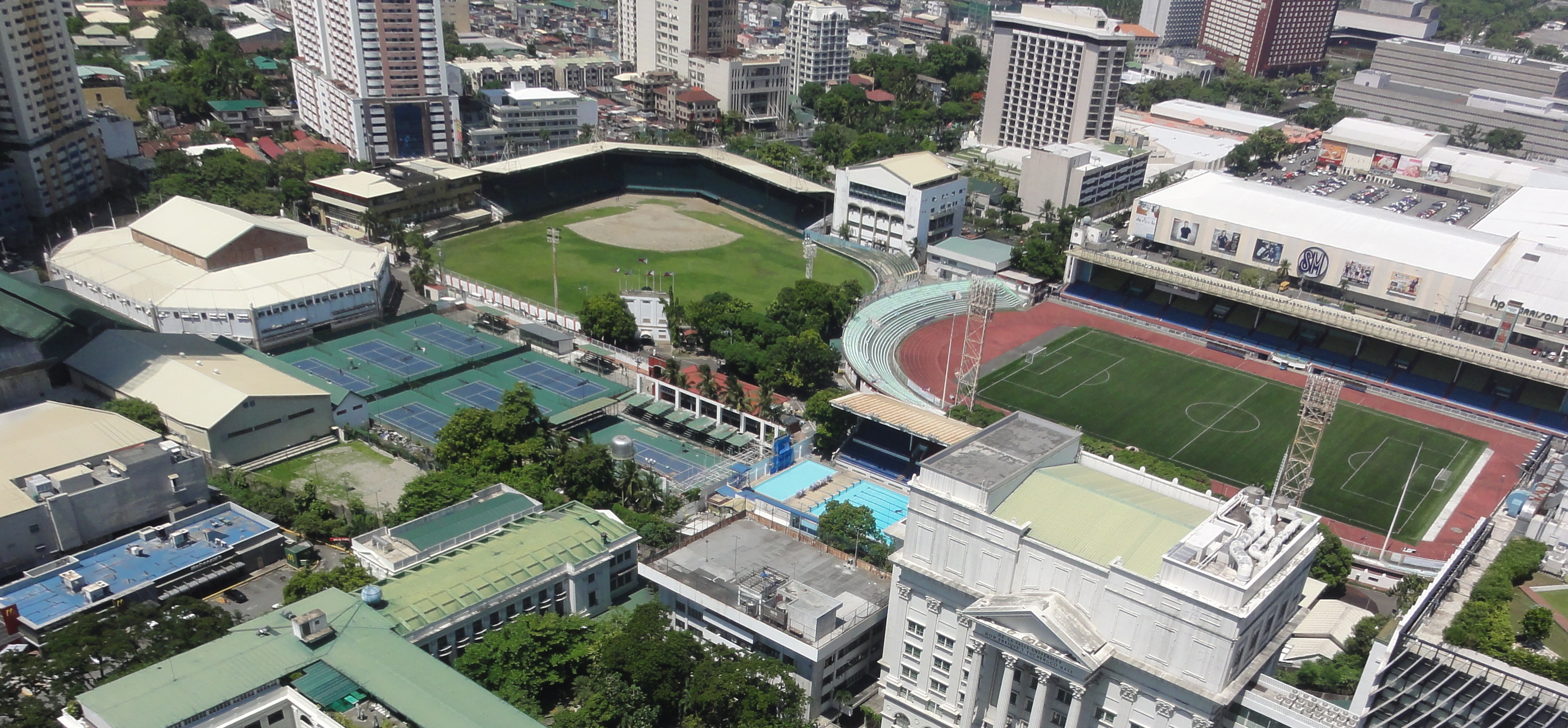
The Rizal Memorial Sports Complex, Manila. Center left and below the baseball field is the Rizal Memorial Tennis Center with the Rizal Memorial Coliseum indoor venue adjacent to the outside tennis courts this was the location of these championships

In 1906 the Manila (Philippine Islands) Lawn Tennis Association was founded. In 1913 it became the Philippine Lawn Tennis Association formally incorporated in 1920. In 1936 it joined the International Lawn Tennis Federation. In 1920 PhilLTA organised the first International Championships of the Philippines.

In 1907 the Championship of the Orient tournament was held in Manila until 1909 and played at the Philippine Amateur Athletic Association tennis court grounds before it was discontinued for one year. In 1911 it was revived until 1917. The Philippines Championships tournament had its origins in the Oriental Tennis Championships event, an early ancestor event of the Asian Championships.

In 1918 the Philippines Championships were held for the first time, and were played at the Manila Tennis Club. In 1920 that tournament became a fully open event called the Philippines Open Championships. From 1918 until 1924 it was an event for men only. In 1925 a women's event was established. In 1934 the Manila Carnival Grounds was renamed and this tournament was then played at the newly built Rizal Memorial Tennis Stadium on clay courts. In 1940 the Rizal Memorial Tennis Stadium was renamed as the Rizal Memorial Coliseum, that now included an indoor stadium.

In 1959 two editions of the men's event were held one in later January and the other in early December. In 1961 two editions of the men's event were played again one in the first week of February on outdoor clay courts, the second during the mid two weeks of month on outdoor hard courts. In 1972 this tournament usually held in February was moved to November that year. For the years 1973 to 1978 it was also valid as the Manila International Championships (f.1968) or Manila Open also played in November. The tournament was discontinued in 1978.

In 1981 PHILTA staged a new tournament called the Philippine Classic that was won by Ramesh Krishnan. After a period of 35 years international tennis returned to the Rizal Memorial Tennis Center in the form of the Manila Challenger (also known as the Philippine Open), a clay court event that was won by Mikhail Youzhny.

This tournament went through a number of different denominations see tournament names below.

== Event names ==
- Philippines Championships (1918–1920).
- International Championships of the Philippines (1920–1941).
- Philippines International Championships (1950–1972).
- Philippines Championships (1973–1974).
- Philta International Championships (1975).
- Philippine Open (1976).
- Philta International Championships (1975, 1977–1978).

== Finals ==
=== Men's singles ===
Notes: In 1959 two editions of the men's event were held one in January denoted as (*) the other in December denoted as (**). In 1961 two editions of the men's were held one in early February denoted as (*) the other in mid February denoted as (**).
(incomplete roll)

International Championships of the Philippines
Year	Champions	Runners-up	Score
↓ PHILTA Circuit ↓
1932	(Japan) Hyotaro Sato	(Japan) Ryosuke Nunoi	6–4, 6–1, 2–6, 6–3.
1935	(Philippines) Leonardo Gavia	(Australia) Edgar Moon	8–6, 3–6, 6–4, 4–6, 6–2.
↓ ILTF World Circuit ↓
1936	(United States) Eugène Smith	(Philippines) Leonardo Gavia	6–3, 6–4.
1937	(Philippines) Leonardo Gavia (2)	(Philippines) Felicisimo Ampon	6–3, 7–5, 2–6, 6–3.
1938	(Japan) Takeo Matsumoto	(Philippines) Juan Ladaw	6–0, 6–1, 7–5.
1941	(Philippines) Felicisimo Ampon	(Philippines) Amado Sanchez	5–7, 4–6 6–2, 6–2, 8–6 .
1942/1949	Not held (due to World War II) and after		
Philippines International Championships
1950	(Spain) Pedro Masip	(Philippines) Felicisimo Ampon	6–4, 2–6, 3–6, 6–3, 6–1.
1951	(Sweden) Sven Davidson	(United States) Irvin Dorfman	6–3, 6–1, 6–2.
1952	(Philippines) Felicisimo Ampon (2)	(Philippines) Raymundo Deyro	3–6, 6–4, 6–2, 7–5.
1953	(Philippines) Felicisimo Ampon (3)	(Italy) Fausto Gardini	4–6, 6–3, 0–6, 6–3, 6–4.
1954	(Philippines) Raymundo Deyro	(Japan) Atsushi Miyagi	6–2, 6–3, 6–0.
1955	(Philippines) Felicisimo Ampon (4)	(Sweden) Sven Davidson	6–1, 6–4, 1–6, 6–2.
1956	(Philippines) Raymundo Deyro (2)	(United States) Herb Flam	6–2, 6–1, 7–5.
1957	(Philippines) Raymundo Deyro (3)	(Philippines) Felicisimo Ampon	6–2, 6–3, 6–2.
1958	(Sweden) Ulf Schmidt	(Philippines) Raymundo Deyro	6–2, 6–4, 6–1.
1959*	(Philippines) Felicisimo Ampon (5)	(Philippines) Raymundo Deyro	2–6, 6–2, 8–6, 6–3.
1959**	(Philippines) Felicisimo Ampon (6)	(Philippines) Raymundo Deyro	6–4, 7–5.
1960	(Philippines) Raymundo Deyro (4)	(Philippines) Johnny Jose	6–2, 6–1, 7–5.
1961 *	(United Kingdom) Mike Sangster	(Philippines) Johnny Jose	5–7, 6–3, 7–5, 6–4.
1961 **	(Australia) Neil Gibson	(Australia) Barry Phillips-Moore	6–4, 6–2, 6–1.
1962	(Australia) Ken Fletcher	(Philippines) Raymundo Deyro	9–7, 6–2, 7–5.
1963	(Philippines) Felicisimo Ampon (7)	(Philippines) Johnny Jose	5–7, 4–6, 7–5, 6–0, 6–1.
1964	(Philippines) Raymundo Deyro (5)	(Philippines) Felicisimo Ampon	6–4, 4–6, 2–6, 11–9, 6–3.
1965	(Australia) Ken Fletcher (2)	(Philippines) Raymundo Deyro	2–6, 9–7, 0–6, 6–4, 6–2.
1966	(Philippines) Felicisimo Ampon (8)	(Philippines) Jesus Hernandez	6–1, 6–0, 6–0
1967	(New Zealand) Ron McKenzie	(Philippines) Felicisimo Ampon	4–6, 2–6, 6–1, 6–3, 6–2.
1968	(Australia) Ray Keldie	(Philippines) Eduardo Cruz	6–3, 6–3, 2–6, 7–5.
↓ Open era ↓
1969	(Australia) Dick Crealy	(Philippines) Eduardo Cruz	2–6, 4–6, 6–2, 6–2, 6–3.
↓ ILTF Independent Tour ↓
1970	(Philippines) Raymundo Deyro (6)	(New Zealand) Ron McKenzie	6–3, 6–3, 6–2.
1971	(Australia) Greg Perkins	(Philippines) Raymundo Deyro	6–2, 3–6, 7–9, 6–4, 6–0
1972	(Mexico) Marcelo Lara	(United States) Dick Dell	6–1, 6–4.
↓ ILTF Grand Prix circuit ↓
1973	(Australia) Ross Case	(Australia) Geoff Masters	6–1, 6–0.
1974	(Egypt) Ismail El Shafei	(Germany) Hans-Jürgen Pohmann	7–6, 6–1.
1975	(Australia) Ross Case (2)	(Italy) Corrado Barazzutti	6–2, 6–1.
1976	(New Zealand) Brian Fairlie	(Australia) Ray Ruffels	7–5, 6–7, 7–6
1977	(Germany) Karl Meiler	(Spain) Manuel Orantes	w.o.
1978	(France) Yannick Noah	(Austria) Peter Feigl	7–6, 6–0

=== Women's singles ===
(incomplete roll)

International Championships of the Philippines
Year	Champions	Runners-up	Score
↓ PHILTA Circuit ↓
1925	(United States) Clarissa Mitchell	(Philippines) Elisa Rosales Ochoa	6–3, 6–2
1926	(United States) Clarissa Mitchell (2)	(Philippines) Elisa Rosales Ochoa	6–4, 6–2
1927	(United States) Clarissa Mitchell (3)	(Philippines) Elisa Rosales Ochoa	6–3, 3–6, 7–5
1930	(Philippines) Elisa Rosales Ochoa	(United States) Alice Davis	6–4, 6–4
1931	(Germany) Irmgard Baumann	(Philippines) B. Calma	6–1, 6–0
1932	(Philippines) Elisa Rosales Ochoa (2)	(Germany) Irmgard Baumann	6–4, 3–6, 6–2
1933	(Philippines) Elisa Rosales Ochoa (3)	(Germany) Irmgard Baumann	6–3, 6–3
1934	(Germany) Irmgard Baumann (2)	(Philippines) Elisa Rosales Ochoa	6–2, 3–6, 6–1
1935	(Philippines) Minda Ochoa	(Philippines) Elisa Rosales Ochoa	6–3, 3–6, 6–4
↓ ILTF World Circuit ↓
1936	(Philippines) Minda Ochoa (2)	(United States) Helen Marlowe Dimitrijevic	6–0, 7–9, 6–1
1937	(Philippines) Minda Ochoa (3)	(Germany) Irmgard Baumann	7–5, 6–4
1938	(Philippines) Minda Ochoa (4)	(Philippines) Estrella Alburo	6–1, 6–3
1939	(Philippines) Minda Ochoa (5)	(Philippines) Aida Ochoa	6–4, 7–5
1940	(Philippines) Liberty Solisa Minda Ochoa	(Philippines) Aida Ochoa	6–2, 3–6, 6–4
1941	(Philippines) Liberty Solisa (2)	(Philippines) Estrella Alburo	6–0, 6–3
1942/1949	Not held (due to World War II) and after		
Philippines International Championships
1950	(Argentina) Mary Terán de Weiss	(Philippines) Minda Ochoa Moldero	6–1, 6–1
1951	(United States) Dorothy Head	(New Zealand) Helen Kingsley	6–0, 6–2
1952	(United Kingdom) Joy Gannon Mottram	(Taiwan) Liu Shang Kuo	6–2, 6–1
1953	(United Kingdom) Joy Gannon Mottram (2)	(Philippines) Minda Ochoa Moldero	6–3, 6–1
1955	(Philippines) Desideria Ampon	(Philippines) Teresita Cosca	6–2, 7–5
1956	(Philippines) Desideria Ampon (2)	(Philippines) Mary Lou Ang	6–2, 6–2
1957	(United Kingdom) Patricia Ward	(Philippines) Desideria Ampon	6–0, 6–1
1958	(Philippines) Desideria Ampon (3)	(Philippines) Patricia Yngayo	6–2, 6–1
1959	(Philippines) Desideria Ampon (4)	(Philippines) Patricia Yngayo	6–2, 6–4
1960	(Philippines) Desideria Ampon (5)	(Philippines) Patricia Yngayo	6–3, 6–1
1961	(Australia) Rosemary White Gibson	(Philippines) Desideria Ampon	6–2, 6–3
1962	(United States) Dorothy Head Knode (2)	(Philippines) Desideria Ampon	6–2, 6–1
1963	(United States) Dorothy Head Knode (3)	(United Kingdom) Rita Bentley	6–4, 5–7, 6–2
1964	(Japan) Reiko Miyagi	(United States) Dorothy Head Knode	6–3, 6–1
1965	(Philippines) Desideria Ampon (6)	(Italy) Francesca Gordigiani	9–7, 6–2
1966	(Philippines) Desideria Ampon (7)	(Philippines) Patricia Yngayo	6–1, 6–2
1967	(Philippines) Desideria Ampon (8)	(Philippines) Linda Lanuza	6–4, 6–2
1968	(Philippines) Desideria Ampon (9)	(Philippines) Teresita Cosca	6–4, 6–1
↓ Open era ↓
1969	(Philippines) Desideria Ampon (10)	(Philippines) Patricia Yngayo	6–3, 6–0
1970	(United States) Ceci Martinez	(Philippines) Patricia Yngayo	6–0, 6–0
1971	(Philippines) Desideria Ampon (11)	(Philippines) Patricia Yngayo	6–1, 6–0
1972	(Colombia) Isabel Fernández de Soto	(Uruguay) Fiorella Bonicelli	6–4, 6–4

== Other tournaments ==
- Manila Challenger (an ATP Challenger tournament held in Manila in 2016)
- Manila International Championships (an international tournament founded in 1968 and played in November through till 1978, and again in 1981.)
- Manila Invitational (a 4 four man exhibition tournament held in 1978 and won by Björn Borg).
- Manila Metropolitan Championships (founded in 1930 held in Manila until 1972, revived by PHILTA in 2023 as the Metro Manila Open).
- Philippine Championships (closed) officially the Philippine National Championships (founded in 1920 ran till 1971).
- Philippine Indoor Championships (founded in 1940 ran till 1950).

== See also ==
- Category:National and multi-national tennis tournaments
