= 1974 South Pacific Championships – Singles =

Singles
- 1974 South Pacific Championships

Final
- Champion: (United States) Dick Stockton
- Runner-up: (Australia) Geoff Masters
- Score: 6–2, 6–3, 6–2

Details
- Draw: 32

Events
Singles	Doubles
South Pacific Tennis Classic	· 1975 →

Dick Stockton won the title, defeating Geoff Masters 6–2, 6–3, 6–2 in the final.

== Draw ==
=== Key ===
- Q = Qualifier
- WC = Wild card
- LL = Lucky loser
- Alt = Alternate
- ITF = ITF entry
- PR = Protected ranking
- SR = Special ranking
- SE = Special exempt
- JE = Junior exempt
- JR = Junior Accelerator Programme entrant
- CO = College Accelerator Programme entrant
- NG = Next Gen Accelerator Program entrant
- w/o = Walkover
- r = Retired
- d = Defaulted

=== Finals ===
Semifinals
(Australia) John Newcombe	3	6	2
(Australia) Geoff Masters	6	3	6
(United States) Dick Stockton	7	5	7
(United States) Sherwood Stewart	6	7	5

Final
(Australia) Geoff Masters	2	3	2
(United States) Dick Stockton	6	6	6

=== Section 1 ===
First round
(Australia) J Newcombe	6	6
(Australia) R Rheinberger	2	3
(Australia) B Carmichael	7	6
(Australia) K Coombes	5	2
(United States) G R Reid	1	5
(Australia) N Fraser	6	7
(United States) J Austin	0	6	3
(Australia) C Letcher	6	3	6
(Australia) G Masters	6	6
(Australia) P Doerner	1	1
(Australia) C Kachel	2	6	4
(Australia) G Thomson	6	4	6
(Australia) A Stone	6	6
(Australia) W Coghlan	2	0
(United States) F McNair	7	6
(Australia) E McCabe	6	3

Second round
(Australia) J Newcombe	6	6
(Australia) B Carmichael	3	3
(Australia) N Fraser	1	6	3
(Australia) C Letcher	6	3	6
(Australia) G Masters	4	6	6
(Australia) G Thomson	6	3	4
(Australia) A Stone	6	7
(United States) F McNair	2	5

Quarterfinals
(Australia) J Newcombe	7	7
(Australia) C Letcher	5	6
(Australia) G Masters	6	4	6
(Australia) A Stone	4	6	4

Semifinals
(Australia) J Newcombe	3	6	2
(Australia) G Masters	6	3	6

=== Section 2 ===
First round
(United States) D Stockton	6	6
(Australia) C Stubs	1	2
(United States) S Segura	3	4
(United States) D Dell	6	6
(Australia) P Kronk	6	6
(Australia) J Stephens	2	4
(Australia) B Giltinan	5	6	7
(Australia) W Durham	7	2	9
(Australia) P Dent	7	6
(Australia) P McNamee	5	2
(Australia) M Pettman	1	6	4
(Australia) E Ewert	6	4	6
(United States) S Stewart	6	6
(Australia) T Little	4	2
(United States) M Estep	6	6
(Australia) W Cowley	4	4

Second round
(United States) D Stockton	6	6
(United States) D Dell	3	4
(Australia) P Kronk	6	6
(Australia) W Durham	3	3
(Australia) P Dent	4	1
(Australia) E Ewert	6	6
(United States) S Stewart	6	7
(United States) M Estep	3	6

Quarterfinals
(United States) D Stockton	6	6
(Australia) P Kronk	2	1
(Australia) E Ewert	3	4
(United States) S Stewart	6	6

Semifinals
(United States) D Stockton	7	5	7
(United States) S Stewart	6	7	5
