= 1980 Australian Hard Court Championships – Doubles =

Doubles
- 1980 Australian Hard Court Championships

Final
- Champions: (Australia) John James (Australia) Chris Kachel
- Runners-up: (Australia) Phil Davies (Australia) Brad Guan
- Score: 6–4, 6–4

Details
- Draw: 16
- Seeds: 4

Events
Singles	Doubles
← 1979 ·	Australian Hard Court Championships	· 1988 →

Phil Dent and Bob Giltinan were the defending champions, but none competed this year. Dent entered the Australian Open singles tournament, reaching the quarterfinals.

John James and Chris Kachel won the title by defeating Phil Davies and Brad Guan 6–4, 6–4 in the final.

== Seeds ==
1. (Australia) Mark Edmondson / (Australia) John Marks (first round)
2. (Australia) Syd Ball / (Australia) Cliff Letcher (quarterfinals)
3. (Australia) John James / (Australia) Chris Kachel (champions)
4. (South Africa) Raymond Moore / (Australia) John Trickey (semifinals)

== Draw ==
=== Key ===
- Q = Qualifier
- WC = Wild card
- LL = Lucky loser
- Alt = Alternate
- SE = Special exempt
- PR = Protected ranking
- ITF = ITF entry
- JE = Junior exempt
- w/o = Walkover
- r = Retired
- d = Defaulted
- SR = Special ranking

=== Draw ===
First round
1	(Australia) M Edmondson (Australia) J Marks	5	6	3
(Australia) P Davies (Australia) B Guan	7	3	6
(United States) G Petrovic (United States) R Van't Hof	2	7	6
(West Germany) Thomas Furst (West Germany) U Marten	6	6	4
4	(South Africa) R Moore (Australia) J Trickey	2	6	6
(Australia) C Johnstone (Australia) G Whitecross	6	2	2
(Australia) E Ewert (Australia) W Hampson	0	3
(Australia) P Campbell (Australia) W Maher	6	6
(United Kingdom) R Beven (United States) C Delaney	2	6	6
(Australia) C Fancutt (Australia) B Phillips-Moore	6	2	4
(France) B Fritz (United States) D Siegler
3	(Australia) J James (Australia) C Kachel	w/o
(United States) J Cohen (Israel) S Glickstein	4	5
(United States) R Fisher (United States) B Maze	6	7
(Australia) W Pascoe (Australia) T Rocavert	6	3	2
2	(Australia) S Ball (Australia) C Letcher	2	6	6

Quarterfinals
(Australia) P Davies (Australia) B Guan	6	6	7
(United States) G Petrovic (United States) R Van't Hof	1	7	5
4	(South Africa) R Moore (Australia) J Trickey	7	3	7
(Australia) P Campbell (Australia) W Maher	5	6	6
(United Kingdom) R Beven (United States) C Delaney	1	1
3	(Australia) J James (Australia) C Kachel	6	6
(United States) R Fisher (United States) B Maze	7	6
2	(Australia) S Ball (Australia) C Letcher	5	4

Semifinals
(Australia) P Davies (Australia) B Guan	6	6
4	(South Africa) R Moore (Australia) J Trickey	3	4
3	(Australia) J James (Australia) C Kachel	5	7	6
(United States) R Fisher (United States) B Maze	7	6	3

Final
(Australia) P Davies (Australia) B Guan	4	4
3	(Australia) J James (Australia) C Kachel	6	6
