= 1977 Marlboro South Australian Men's Tennis Classic – Doubles =

Doubles
- 1977 Marlboro South Australian Men's Tennis Classic

Final
- Champions: (Australia) Cliff Letcher (United States) Dick Stockton
- Runners-up: (Australia) Syd Ball (Australia) Kim Warwick
- Score: 6–3, 4–6, 6–4

Details
- Draw: 24
- Seeds: 8

Events
Singles	Doubles
- South Australian Championships

The event was being held for the first time since 1974.

Cliff Letcher and Dick Stockton won the title, defeating Syd Ball and Kim Warwick 6–3, 4–6, 6–4 in the final.

== Seeds ==
1. (United States) Marty Riessen / (United States) Roscoe Tanner (quarterfinals)
2. (United States) Charlie Pasarell / (United States) Erik van Dillen (quarterfinals)
3. (Australia) Ray Ruffels / (Australia) Allan Stone (quarterfinals)
4. (Australia) Ross Case / (Australia) Geoff Masters (quarterfinals)
5. (United States) Hank Pfister / (United States) Sherwood Stewart (second round)
6. (Australia) Syd Ball / (Australia) Kim Warwick (final)
7. (Australia) John Alexander / (Australia) Phil Dent (semifinals)
8. (Australia) Cliff Letcher / (United States) Dick Stockton (champions)

== Draw ==
Key

- Q = Qualifier
- WC = Wild card
- LL = Lucky loser
- Alt = Alternate
- ITF = ITF entry
- PR = Protected ranking
- SR = Special ranking
- SE = Special exempt
- JE = Junior exempt
- JR = Junior Accelerator Programme entrant
- CO = College Accelerator Programme entrant
- NG = Next Gen Accelerator Program entrant
- w/o = Walkover
- r = Retired
- d = Defaulted

=== Finals ===
Semifinals
7	(Australia) John Alexander (Australia) Phil Dent	3	4
6	(Australia) Syd Ball (Australia) Kim Warwick	6	6
(Australia) Colin Dibley (Australia) Chris Kachel	5	4
8	(Australia) Cliff Letcher (United States) Dick Stockton	7	6

Final
6	(Australia) Syd Ball (Australia) Kim Warwick	3	6	4
8	(Australia) Cliff Letcher (United States) Dick Stockton	6	4	6

=== Top half ===
First round
(Australia) V Eke (Australia) T Rocavert	6	6
(Australia) Chilen (Australia) Rodney Fowler	2	3
7	(Australia) J Alexander (Australia) P Dent	6	6
(Australia) T Little (Australia) G Thomson	3	4
(Australia) B Drewett (Australia) B Phillips-Moore	7	6
(Australia) J Bartlett (Australia) A Gardiner	5	3
6	(Australia) S Ball (Australia) K Warwick	6	6
(Australia) Lynton Franzi (Australia) Grant Kerr	1	4

Second round
1	(United States) M Riessen (United States) R Tanner	6	6
(Australia) V Eke (Australia) T Rocavert	3	3
7	(Australia) J Alexander (Australia) P Dent	6	6
(West Germany) K Eberhard (West Germany) R Gehring	3	2
4	(Australia) R Case (Australia) G Masters	6	6
(Australia) B Drewett (Australia) B Phillips-Moore	3	4
6	(Australia) S Ball (Australia) K Warwick	6	6
(West Germany) U Marten (West Germany) Heiner Seuss	0	2

Quarterfinals
1	(United States) M Riessen (United States) R Tanner	6
7	(Australia) J Alexander (Australia) P Dent	8
4	(Australia) R Case (Australia) G Masters	5
6	(Australia) S Ball (Australia) K Warwick	8

Semifinals
7	(Australia) J Alexander (Australia) P Dent	3	4
6	(Australia) S Ball (Australia) K Warwick	6	6

=== Bottom half ===
First round
(Australia) C Fancutt (Australia) Noel Jensen	2	1
5	(United States) H Pfister (United States) S Stewart	6	6
(Australia) M Edmondson (Australia) J Marks	6	7
(Australia) W Pascoe (Australia) Ronald Russo	4	5
(Australia) D Carter (Australia) W Maher	4	4
8	(Australia) C Letcher (United States) D Stockton	6	6
(United States) V Amaya (United States) B Teacher	6	4
2	(United States) C Pasarell (United States) E van Dillen	7	6

Second round
(Australia) C Dibley (Australia) C Kachel	6	6
5	(United States) H Pfister (United States) S Stewart	4	3
(Australia) M Edmondson (Australia) J Marks	5	3
3	(Australia) R Ruffels (Australia) A Stone	7	6
(United Kingdom) J Feaver (Australia) J James	3	4
8	(Australia) C Letcher (United States) D Stockton	6	6
(Australia) B Carmichael (United Kingdom) R Drysdale	6	1
2	(United States) C Pasarell (United States) E van Dillen	7	6

Quarterfinals
(Australia) C Dibley (Australia) C Kachel	8
3	(Australia) R Ruffels (Australia) A Stone	4
8	(Australia) C Letcher (United States) D Stockton	8
2	(United States) C Pasarell (United States) E van Dillen	4

Semifinals
(Australia) C Dibley (Australia) C Kachel	5	4
8	(Australia) C Letcher (United States) D Stockton	7	6
