= 1980 Australian Hard Court Championships =

- Date: 31 December 1979 – 6 January 1980
- Edition: 35th
- Category: Grand Prix circuit
- Draw: 32S / 16D
- Prize money: $50,000
- Surface: Hard / outdoor
- Location: Hobart, Australia

Champions

Singles
- (Israel) Shlomo Glickstein

Doubles
- (Australia) John James / (Australia) Chris Kachel
- Australian Hard Court Championships

The 1980 Australian Hard Court Tennis Championships was a men's tennis tournament that was part of the 1980 Grand Prix tennis circuit. It was the 36th edition of the event and was held in Hobart, Australia from 31 December 1979 until 6 January 1980 and played on outdoor hardcourts. Unseeded Shlomo Glickstein won the singles title.

== Finals ==
=== Singles ===
(Israel) Shlomo Glickstein defeated (United States) Robert Van't Hof 7–6, 6–4

- It was Glickstein's first singles title of his career.

=== Doubles ===
(Australia) John James / (Australia) Chris Kachel defeated (Australia) Phil Davies / (Australia) Brad Guan 6–4, 6–4
