= Manila International Championships =

Manila International Championships Manila Open

Defunct tennis tournament
- Tour: ILTF World Circuit (1968–69); ITF Independent (1970–72, 81); Grand Prix circuit (1973–78)
- Founded: 1968
- Abolished: 1981
- Editions: 12
- Location: Manila, Philippines
- Venue: Rizal Memorial Tennis Center
- Surface: Clay; Hard

The Manila International Championships also known as the Manila Open was a men's tennis tournament played at the Rizal Memorial Tennis Center in Manila, Philippines from 1973 to 1978 and again in 1981.

The event was originally part of the ILTF World Circuit then later Grand Prix tennis circuit and was played on outdoor clay courts 1968 to 1972, 1974 to 1978, and again in 1981 and on hard courts in 1973.

== History ==
In 1968, the Manila International Championships were established and the tournament was usually played in November. For the years 1973 to 1978 this tournament was also co valid, as the Philippines Open International Championships also called the Philippines Championships or Philippine Open that event was organised by the Philippine Tennis Association (PHILTA) and was established in 1918. That event ran until 1978, when it was discontinued. That event was usually played in February then switched to November in 1971. In 1981, this tournament was revived for one edition only as the Manila Open, also called the Philippines Masters.

== Finals ==
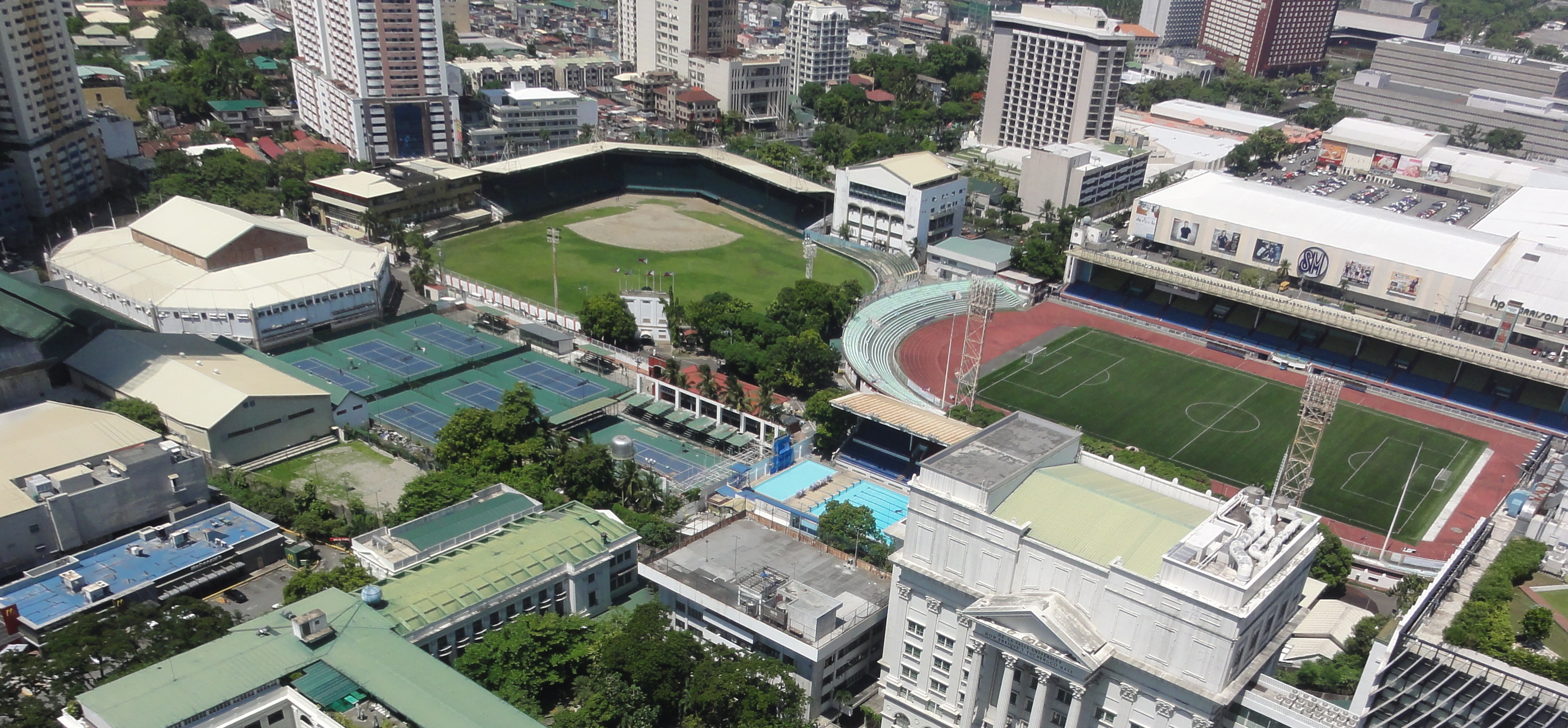
The Rizal Memorial Sports Complex, Manila. Center left and below the baseball field is the Rizal Memorial Tennis Center with the Rizal Memorial Coliseum indoor venue adjacent to the outside tennis courts this was the location of this tournament.

=== Singles ===
Manila International Championships/Manila Open
Year	Champions	Runners-up	Score
↓ ILTF World Circuit ↓
1968	(Brazil) Thomaz Koch	(Australia) Bob Carmichael	6–4, 6–2.
↓ Open era ↓
1969	(Italy) Giuseppe Merlo	(Japan) Koji Watanabe	6–3, 4–6, 6–4.
↓ ITF Independent Tour ↓
1970	(Philippines) Raymundo Deyro	(India) Ramanathan Krishnan	6–3, 7–5, 8–6.
1971	(Austria) Gerhard Wimmer	(Philippines) Raymundo Deyro	6–4, 6–3, 6–1.
1972	(Philippines) Raymundo Deyro (2)	(Australia) Syd Ball	6–2, 2–6, 6–4.
↓ Grand Prix Circuit ↓
1973	(Australia) Ross Case	(Australia) Geoff Masters	6–1, 6–0.
1974	(Egypt) Ismail El Shafei	(Germany) Hans-Jürgen Pohmann	7–6, 6–1.
1975	(Australia) Ross Case (2)	(Italy) Corrado Barazzutti	6–2, 6–1.
1976	(New Zealand) Brian Fairlie	(Australia) Ray Ruffels	7–5, 6–7, 7–6.
1977	(Germany) Karl Meiler	(Spain) Manuel Orantes	w.o.
1978	(France) Yannick Noah	(Austria) Peter Feigl	7–6, 6–0.
↓ ITF Independent Tour ↓
1981	(Philippines) Romeo Rafon	(Indonesia) Yustedjo Tarik	6–4, 6–2.

=== Doubles ===
Year	Champions	Runners-up	Score
1973	(Mexico) Marcello Lara (United States) Sherwood Stewart	(Germany) Jürgen Fassbender (Germany) Hans-Jürgen Pohmann	6–2, 6–0
1974	(Australia) Syd Ball (Australia) Ross Case	(United States) Mike Estep (Mexico) Marcello Lara	6–3, 7–6, 9–7
1975	(Australia) Ross Case (Australia) Geoff Masters	(Australia) Syd Ball (Australia) Kim Warwick	6–1, 6–2
1976	(Australia) Ross Case (Australia) Geoff Masters	(India) Anand Amritraj (Italy) Corrado Barazzutti	6–0, 6–1
1977	(Australia) Chris Kachel (Australia) John Marks	(United States) Mike Cahill (United States) Terry Moor	4–6, 6–0, 7–6
1978	(United States) Sherwood Stewart (United States) Brian Teacher	(Australia) Ross Case (Australia) Chris Kachel	6–3, 7–6
