= 1974 Philippine Championships =

Tennis tournament

- Date: 11–17 November
- Edition: 2nd
- Category: Grand Prix (Group B)
- Draw: 32S / 16D
- Prize money: $25,000
- Surface: Clay / outdoor
- Location: Manila, Philippines

Champions

Singles
- (Egypt) Ismail El Shafei

Doubles
- (Australia) Syd Ball / (United States) Ross Case
← 1973 ·	Philippines Championships	· 1975 →

The 1974 Philippine Championships was a men's tennis tournament played on outdoor clay courts in Manila, the Philippines. It was the second edition of the event and was held from 11 November through 17 November 1974. The tournament was part of the Group B tier of the Grand Prix tennis circuit. Ismail El Shafei won the singles title.

== Finals ==
=== Singles ===
(Egypt) Ismail El Shafei defeated (West Germany) Hans-Jürgen Pohmann 7–6, 6–1

- It was El Shafei's 2nd singles title of the year and the 6th of his career.

=== Doubles ===
(Australia) Syd Ball / (Australia) Ross Case defeated (United States) Mike Estep / (Mexico) Marcello Lara 6–3, 6–7, 9–7
