= 1974 South Pacific Championships =

- Date: 21–27 October
- Edition: 1st
- Category: Grand Prix
- Draw: 32S / 16D
- Prize money: $20,000
- Location: Melbourne, Victoria, Australia
- Venue: Royal South Yarra Tennis Club

Champions

Singles
- (United States) Dick Stockton

Doubles
- (United States) Grover Raz Reid / (Australia) Allan Stone
- South Pacific Championships

The 1974 South Pacific Championships, also known as the Melbourne Grand Prix, was an Association of Tennis Professionals men's tournament held at the Royal South Yarra Tennis Club in Melbourne, Victoria, Australia that was part of the 1974 Grand Prix tennis circuit. It was the inaugural edition of the tournament and was held from 21 October until 27 October 1974. Second-seeded Dick Stockton won the singles title.

== Finals ==
=== Singles ===
(United States) Dick Stockton defeated (Australia) Geoff Masters 6–2, 6–3, 6–2

- It was Stockton's 3rd title of the year and the 6th of his career.

=== Doubles ===
(United States) Grover Raz Reid / (Australia) Allan Stone defeated (United States) Mike Estep / (Australia) Paul Kronk 7–6, 6–4

- It was Reid's 2nd title of the year and the 2nd of his career. It was Stone's 2nd title of the year and the 6th of his career.
