= 1978 Philta International =

- Date: 20–26 November
- Edition: 6th
- Category: Grand Prix
- Draw: 32S / 16D
- Prize money: $75,000
- Surface: Clay/ outdoor
- Location: Manila, Philippines

Champions

Singles
- (France) Yannick Noah

Doubles
- (United States) Sherwood Stewart / (Austria) Brian Teacher
| ← 1977 · | Philta International Championships | · 1979 → |

The 1978 Philta International was a men's tennis tournament played an outdoor clay courts in Manila, Philippines. It was the sixth edition of the tournament and was held from 20 November through 26 November 1978. The tournament was part of the Grand Prix tennis circuit. Eighth-seeded Yannick Noah won the singles title and earned $12,750 first-prize money.

== Finals ==
=== Singles ===
(France) Yannick Noah defeated (Austria) Peter Feigl 7–6, 6–0

- It was Noah's first singles title of his career.

=== Doubles ===
(United States) Sherwood Stewart / (Austria) Brian Teacher defeated (United States) Ross Case / (United States) Chris Kachel 6–3, 7–6
