= 1975 Philta International Championships =

- Date: 27 October – 2 November
- Edition: 3rd
- Category: Grand Prix (Grade A)
- Draw: 32S / 16D
- Prize money: $75,000
- Surface: Hard court / outdoor
- Location: Manila, Philippines

Champions

Singles
- (Australia) Ross Case

Doubles
- (Australia) Ross Case / (Australia) Geoff Masters
- Philta International Championships

The 1975 Philta International Championships was a men's tennis tournament played an outdoor hard courts in Manila, Philippines. It was the third edition of the tournament and was held from 27 October through 2 November 1975. The tournament was part of the Grand Prix tennis circuit and categorized in Group A. Ross Case won the singles title and the $12,000 first prize money.

== Finals ==
=== Singles ===
(Australia) Ross Case defeated (Italy) Corrado Barazzutti 6–3, 6–1

- It was Case's 1st singles title of the year and the 4th of his career.

=== Doubles ===
(Australia) Ross Case / (Australia) Geoff Masters defeated (Australia) Syd Ball / (Australia) Kim Warwick 6–1, 6–2
