= 1980 Robinsons South Pacific Classic =

- Date: 6–12 October
- Edition: 7th
- Category: Grand Prix
- Draw: 32S / 16D
- Prize money: $50,000
- Surface: Grass / outdoor
- Location: Brisbane, Queensland, Australia
- Venue: Milton Courts

Champions

Singles
- (United States) John McEnroe

Doubles
- (United States) John McEnroe / (United States) Matt Mitchell
- South Pacific Tennis Classic

The 1980 Robinsons South Pacific Classic was an Association of Tennis Professionals men's tournament held on outdoor grass courts at the Milton Courts in Brisbane, Queensland, Australia that was part of the 1980 Grand Prix tennis circuit. It was the seventh edition of the tournament and was held from 6 October until 12 October 1980. First-seeded John McEnroe won the singles title.

== Finals ==
=== Singles ===
(United States) John McEnroe defeated (Australia) Phil Dent 6–3, 6–4

- It was McEnroe's 6th singles title of the year and the 21st of his career.

=== Doubles ===
(United States) John McEnroe / (United States) Matt Mitchell defeated (Australia) Phil Dent / (Australia) Rod Frawley 8–6 (Note: Players agreed to play a single pro-set due to failing light conditions and commitments to participate in the subsequent Australian Indoor Championships.)
