= 1977 Marlboro South Australian Men's Tennis Classic =

- Date: 10–16 January
- Edition: 77th
- Category: Grand Prix circuit
- Draw: 64S / 32D
- Prize money: $75,000
- Surface: Grass / outdoor
- Location: Adelaide, Australia

Champions

Singles
- (United States) Victor Amaya

Doubles
- (Australia) Cliff Letcher / (United States) Dick Stockton
- South Australian Championships

The 1977 Marlboro South Australian Men's Tennis Classic was a men's tennis tournament played on outdoor grass courts in Adelaide, Australia. The event was part of the 1977 Grand Prix circuit and categorized as a two–star event. It was the 77th edition of the tournament and was held from 10 January through 16 January 1977. The singles title and $13,500 prize money was won by Victor Amaya.

== Finals ==
=== Singles ===
(United States) Victor Amaya defeated (United States) Brian Teacher 6–1, 6–4

- It was Amaya's first singles title of the year and of his career.

=== Doubles ===
(Australia) Cliff Letcher / (United States) Dick Stockton defeated (Australia) Syd Ball / (Australia) Kim Warwick 6–3, 4–6, 6–4

- It was Letcher's only title of the year and the 1st of his career. It was Stockton's 1st title of the year and the 13th of his career.
