= 1975 South Pacific Championships =

- Date: 6–12 October
- Edition: 2nd
- Category: Grand Prix
- Draw: 32S / 16D
- Prize money: $50,000
- Surface: Clay / outdoor
- Location: Melbourne, Victoria, Australia
- Venue: Royal South Yarra Tennis Club

Champions

Singles
- (United States) Brian Gottfried

Doubles
- (Australia) Ross Case / (Australia) Geoff Masters
- South Pacific Championships

The 1975 South Pacific Championships was an Association of Tennis Professionals men's tournament held on outdoor clay courts at the Royal South Yarra Tennis Club in Melbourne, Victoria, Australia that was part of the 1975 Grand Prix tennis circuit. It was the second edition of the tournament and was held from 6 October until 12 October 1975. Seventh-seeded Brian Gottfried won the singles title and earned $10,000 first-prize money.

== Finals ==
=== Singles ===
(United States) Brian Gottfried defeated (United States) Harold Solomon 6–2, 7–6, 6–1

- It was Gottfried's 3rd singles title of the year and the 6th of his career.

=== Doubles ===
(Australia) Ross Case / (Australia) Geoff Masters defeated (United States) Brian Gottfried / (Mexico) Raúl Ramirez 6–4, 6–0
