= 2026 Philippine Women's Open =

- Date: 26–31 January
- Edition: 1st
- Category: WTA 125
- Draw: 32S / 14D
- Prize money: $115,000
- Surface: Hard
- Location: Manila, Philippines
- Venue: Rizal Memorial Tennis Center

Champions

Singles
- (Colombia) Camila Osorio

Doubles
- (Hong Kong) Eudice Chong / (Chinese Taipei) Liang En-shuo
- Philippine Women's Open

The 2026 Philippine Women's Open was a professional women's tennis tournament played on outdoor hardcourts. It was the first edition of the tournament and part of the 2026 WTA 125 tournaments, offering a total of $115,000 in prize money. It took place at the Rizal Memorial Tennis Center in Manila, Philippines between 26 and 31 January 2026. This was the first time a WTA event took place in the Philippines.

== Singles entrants ==
=== Seeds ===
Country	Player	Rank^{1}	Seed
GER	Tatjana Maria	42	1
PHI	Alexandra Eala	49	2
ARG	Solana Sierra	63	3
CRO	Donna Vekić	72	4
COL	Camila Osorio	84	5
NZL	Lulu Sun	86	6
SUI	Simona Waltert	87	7
LAT	Darja Semeņistaja	98	8

- ^{1} Rankings are as of 19 January 2026.

=== Other entrants ===
The following players received a wildcard into the singles main draw:

- (Philippines) Elizabeth Abarquez
- (Philippines) Alexandra Eala
- (Philippines) Kaye Anne Emana
- (Philippines) Tennielle Madis

The following players received entry from the qualifying draw:

- (Japan) Sakura Hosogi
- (Japan) Miho Kuramochi
- (Slovakia) Viktória Morvayová
- (Thailand) Peangtarn Plipuech

=== Withdrawals ===
- (Armenia) Elina Avanesyan → replaced by Mariia Tkacheva
- (Australia) Kimberly Birrell → replaced by (Thailand) Mananchaya Sawangkaew
- (Kazakhstan) Yulia Putintseva → replaced by (Japan) Sara Saito
- (Japan) Moyuka Uchijima → replaced by (Japan) Mai Hontama
- (China) Wang Xinyu → replaced by Tatiana Prozorova

== Doubles entrants ==
=== Seeds ===
Country	Player	Country	Player	Rank	Seed
USA	Quinn Gleason	USA	Sabrina Santamaria	137	1
HKG	Eudice Chong	TPE	Liang En-shuo	177	2
TPE	Cho I-hsuan	TPE	Cho Yi-tsen	224	3
ARG	Nicole Fossa Huergo	LAT	Darja Semeņistaja	289	4

- Rankings as of 19 January 2026.

=== Other entrants ===
The following pairs received a wildcard into the doubles main draw:

- (Philippines) Elizabeth Abarquez / (Philippines) Rovie Baulete
- (Philippines) Angeline Alcala / (Philippines) Joanna Victoria Peña
- (Philippines) Stefi Marithe Aludo / (Philippines) Tennielle Madis
- (Philippines) Kaye Anne Emana / (Philippines) Justine Hannah Maneja

== Champions ==
=== Singles ===
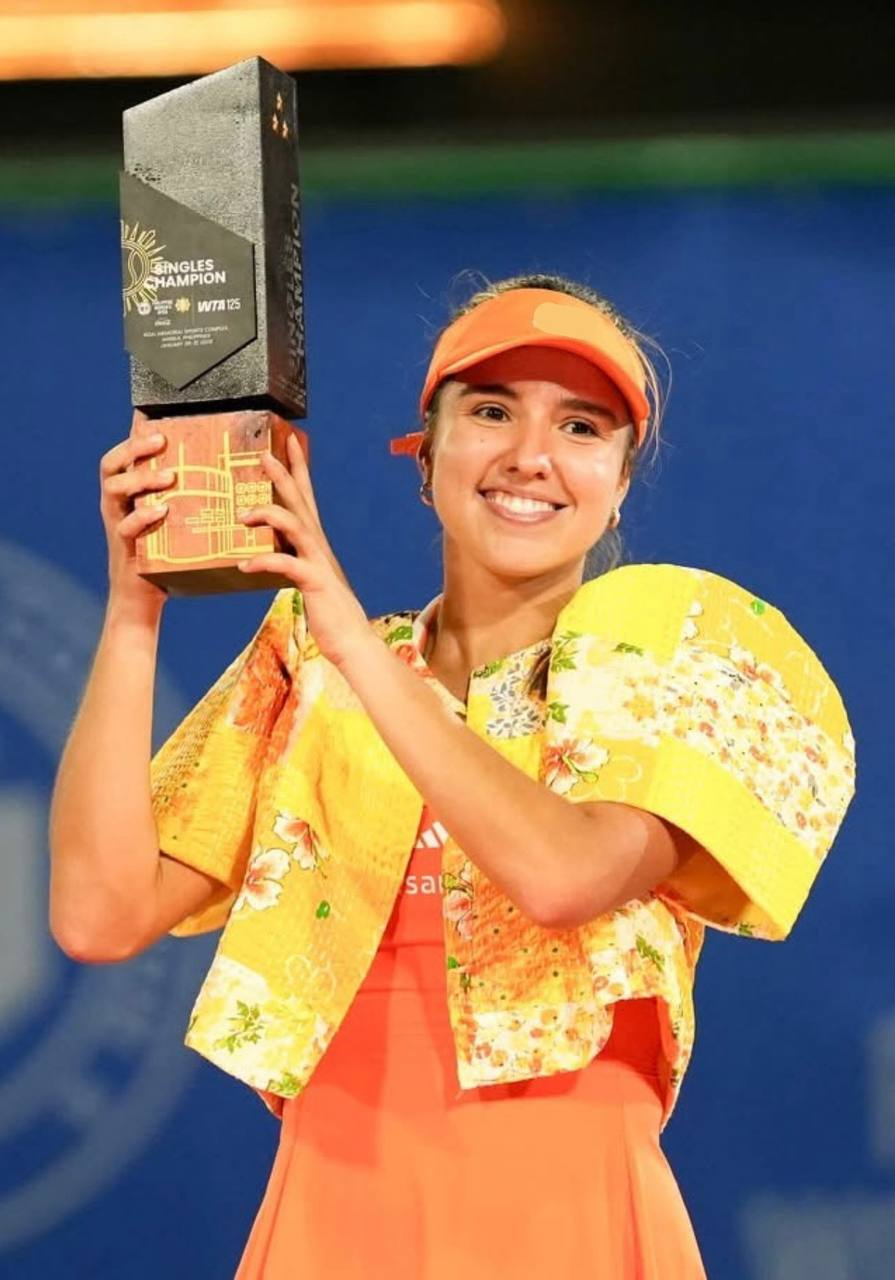
Camila Osorio with the 2026 Philippine Women’s Open singles winners trophy

- (Colombia) Camila Osorio def. (Croatia) Donna Vekić 2–6, 6–3, 7–5

=== Doubles ===
- (Hong Kong) Eudice Chong / (Chinese Taipei) Liang En-shuo def. (United States) Quinn Gleason / (United States) Sabrina Santamaria, 2–6, 7–6^{(7–2)}, [10–6]
