= 1976 Philippine Open =

- Date: 15–21 November
- Edition: 4th
- Category: Grand Prix (Two Star)
- Draw: 48S / 16D
- Prize money: $75,000
- Surface: Clay/ outdoor
- Location: Manila, Philippines

Champions

Singles
- (Australia) Brian Fairlie

Doubles
- (Australia) Ross Case / (Australia) Geoff Masters
- Philta International Championships

The 1976 Philippine Open was a men's tennis tournament played an outdoor clay courts in Manila, Philippines. It was the fourth edition of the tournament and was held from 15 November through 21 November 1976. The tournament was part of the Grand Prix tennis circuit and categorized as Two Star. Sixth-seeded Brian Fairlie won the singles title and the $10,500 first prize money.

== Finals ==
=== Singles ===
(New Zealand) Brian Fairlie defeated (Australia) Ray Ruffels 7–5, 6–7, 7–6

- It was Fairlie's 1st singles title of the year and the 2nd and last of his career.

=== Doubles ===
(Australia) Ross Case / (Australia) Geoff Masters defeated (India) Anand Amritraj / (Italy) Corrado Barazzutti 6–0, 6–1
