= Mitsubishi Lancer International Junior Tennis Championship =

Defunct tennis tournament
- Founded: 1990
- Abolished: 2014
- Editions: 25
- Location: Manila, Philippines
- Venue: Rizal Memorial Tennis Center
- Category: Grade 1 (2002–2014)
- Surface: Hard

The Mitsubishi Lancer International Junior Tennis Championship (MLIJTC) is an international junior tennis tournament in the Philippines.

== History ==
The Mitsubishi Lancer International Junior Tennis Championship (MLIJTC), a tournament sponsored by Mitsubishi Motors Philippines, held its first edition in 1990. It has been part of the International Tennis Federation (ITF) junior circuit starting as a Grade 3 competition.

By 1996, the MLIJTC is already Grade 2 tournament. It was reportedly the third largest tournament in Asia after the Suntory Open in Japan (Grade 1) and the Hong Kong International Juniors (Grade 2) at around that time.

In 2002, the MLIJTC was elevated to Grade 1. It remained so until its last iteration.

The tournament held its 25th edition in 2014. The Philippine Tennis Association announced in 2015, that Mitsubishi has informed them that it is dissolving the tournament over unaddressed issues over the state of the Rizal Memorial Tennis Center.

== Venue ==
The Rizal Memorial Tennis Center in Manila is the main venue of the MLIJTC. In 1996, the tournament was held at the Manila Polo Club in Makati instead when the Rizal venue was being renovated.

== Legacy ==
The tournament itself was inducted to the PSA Hall of Fame of the 2015 Annual Awards of the Philippine Sportswriters Association.

Dominated by foreign tennis players, the boys' single tournament has never been won by a Filipino. Lleyton Hewitt, Andy Roddick, Leander Paes, and Mark Philippoussis have played in the MLIJTC. In 2009, Francis Alcantara teamed up with Swedish player Daniel Berta to win the boys' doubles.

There are three Filipina winners in the girls' tournament: Francesca La'O (1991 and 1994), Jennifer Saret (1993), and Maricris Fernandez (1995 and 1997).

== Results ==
=== Boys' singles ===
Year	Champions	Runners-up	Score	Ref.
1990–1992	No information (3)			
1993	(Slovakia) Martin Hromec	(Australia) James Sekulov	6–3, 6–3	
1994	(Indonesia) Andrian Raturandang	(Slovakia) Dominik Hrbatý	7–5 4–6 6–3	
1995	(United Kingdom) Martin Lee	(Canada) Jocelyn Robichaud	w/o	
1996	(Slovenia) Miha Gregorc	(South Korea) Lee Seung-hoon	6–3, 6–4	
1997	(South Africa) Wesley Whitehouse	(Australia) Lleyton Hewitt	6–4, 6–3	
1998	(Thailand) Danai Udomchoke	(Sweden) Jacob Adaktusson	7–5, 6–0	
1999	(United States) David Martin	(United States) Mardy Fish	7–6, 6–3	
2000	(Germany) Simon Stadler	(United States) Matthew Emeryn	6–2, 6–0	
2001	(Slovenia) Luka Gregorc	(Australia) Clint Charles	6–4, 6–3	
2002	(Australia) Robert Smeets	(United States) Chris Kwon	6–3, 3–6, 6–4	
2003	(Australia) Adam Feeney	(United Kingdom) Jamie Baker	6–2, 6–2	
2004	(United Kingdom) Tom Rushby	(India) Tushar Liberhan	6–4, 7–6 (8)	
2005	(Kuwait) Abdullah Maqdes	(Hong Kong) Martin Sayer	6–3, 6–3	
2006	(Chinese Taipei) Lee Hsin-Han	(Japan) Sho Aida	7–6 (2), 5–7, 6–4	
2007	(Australia) John-Patrick Smith	(Croatia) Silvio Dadic	6–4, 6–4	
2008	(South Korea) Cho Soong-Jae	(Slovenia) Borut Puc	7–5, 6–1	
2009	(Sweden) Daniel Berta	(New Zealand) Riki McLachlan	6–3, 6–4	
2010	(Australia) James Duckworth	(Sweden) Tobias Blomgren	6–3, 6–2	
2011	(Australia) Andrew Whittington	(Philippines) Jeson Patrombon	6–2, 6–3	
2012	(New Zealand) Nikola Milojević	(Australia) Jordan Thompson	6–0, 7–5	
2013	(New Zealand) Cameron Norrie	(United Kingdom) Luke Bambridge	6–2, 6–4	
2014	(South Korea) Kang Ku-keon	(United Kingdom) Rhett Purcell	6–3, 6–4	

=== Girls' singles ===
Year	Champions	Runners-up	Score	Ref.
1990	No information			
1991	(Philippines) Francesca La'O			
1992	(Romania) Cătălina Cristea			
1993	(Philippines) Jennifer Saret			
1994	(Philippines) Francesca La'O	(Australia) Jodi Richardson	1–6, 6–4, 6–3	
1995	(Philippines) Maricris Fernandez			
1996	(Japan) Saori Obata	(China) Liu Weina	6–3, 6–3	
1997	(Philippines) Maricris Fernandez			
1998–1999	No information (2)			
2000	(Indonesia) Angelique Widjaja	(Australia) Nicole Kriz	6–4, 6–4	
2001	(Chinese Taipei) Hsieh Su-wei			
2002–2006	No information (5)			
2007	(Hong Kong) Zhang Li	(Chinese Taipei) Chang Kai-chen	6–4, 6–1	
2008	(Thailand) Noppawan Lertcheewakarn	(Hungary) Timea Babos	3–6, 7–5, 6–4	
2009	(Russia) Polina Leykina	(Russia) Ekaterina Nikitina	6–2, 6–4	
2010	(Russia) Irina Khromacheva	(China) Tian Ran	6–2, 6–2	
2011	(Serbia) Jovana Jović	(Estonia) Anett Kontaveit	6–4, 7–6 (3)	
2012	(Australia) Storm Sanders	(Russia) Anna Tyulpa	4–6, 6–3, 6–1	
2013	(Turkey) İpek Soylu	(United Kingdom) Katie Boulter	6–2 4–6 6–3	
2014	(Canada) Gloria Liang	(Australia) Kimberly Birrell	6–2 7–5	

=== Boys' doubles ===
Year	Champions	Runners-up	Score	Ref.
1990–1993	No information			
1994	(Canada) Chris Santoso (Australia) Novak Nash	(Slovakia) Dominik Hrbatý (Slovakia) Milan Turkovik	3–6, 7–5, 6–3	
1995	No information			
1996	(South Africa) Wesley Whitehouse (South Africa) Damien Roberts	(Slovakia) Dominik Hrbatý (Belgium) Xavier Malisse	7–6 (2), 6–2	
1997–1998	No information			
1999	(United States) David Martin (United States) Chris Martin			
2000–2005	No information			
2006	(Chinese Taipei) Lee Hsin-Han (Chinese Taipei) Peng Hsien-yin			
2007	(Chinese Taipei) Peng Hsien-yin (Chinese Taipei) Yang Tsung-hua	(Russia) Nikita Zotov (Russia) Evgeny Donskoy	6–3, 6–3	
2008	(Slovenia) Borut Puc (Thailand) Kittipong Wachiramanowong	(Australia) Andrew Thomas (Australia) Mark Verryth	7–6 (1), 6–1	
2009	(Philippines) Francis Alcantara (Sweden) Daniel Berta	(New Zealand) Ben McLachlan (New Zealand) Niki McLachlan	6–3, 6–0	
2010	(Philippines) Francis Alcantara (United States) Raymond Sarmiento	(New Zealand) Sam Barry (New Zealand) Ben McLachlan	6–4, 6–3	
2011–2013	No information			
2014	(United Kingdom) Rhett Purcell (New Zealand) Alexander Klintcharov	(Chinese Taipei) Lin Wei De (Chinese Taipei) Yang Shao Chi	7–6 (5), 7–5	

=== Girls' doubles ===
Year	Champions	Runners-up	Score	Ref.
1990–1995	No information			
1996	(Japan) Saori Obata (Japan) Nami Orabe	(South Africa) Surina de Beer (Thailand) Marissa Niroj	6–3, 7–5	
1997–1998	No information			
2000	(Indonesia) Angelique Widjaja (Indonesia) Dea Sumantri	(United Kingdom) Elena Baltacha (United Kingdom) Jane O'Donoghue	6–1, 3–6, 6–3	
2001–2006	No information			
2007	(Philippines) Denise Dy (Indonesia) Jessy Rompies	(Chinese Taipei) Chang Kai-chen (United States) Veronica Li	6–3, 6–1	
2008	(Hungary) Timea Babos (Hungary) Réka Luca Jani	(Japan) Misaki Doi (Russia) Elena Chernyakova	6–5 (4), 6–0, 10–7	
2009	No information			
2010	(Serbia) Tamara Čurović (Thailand) Luksika Kumkhum	(Russia) Irina Khromacheva (Belarus) Ilona Kremen	5–7, 6–4, 10–8	
2011–2013	No information			
2014	(United Kingdom) Katie Boulder (United Kingdom) Freya Christie	(Japan) Natsuho Arakawa (Australia) Lizette Cabrera	6–4, 6–1	

== See also ==
- PCA Open
