= 1981 Philippine Classic =

Tennis tournament

- Date: 23–30 November
- Edition: 1st
- Category: Grand Prix
- Draw: 32S / 16D
- Prize money: $85,500
- Surface: Carpet / outdoor
- Location: Manila, Philippines

Champions

Singles
- (India) Ramesh Krishnan

Doubles
- (United States) John Benson / (United States) Mike Bauer
Philippine Classic	· 1982 →

The 1981 Philippine Classic was a men's tennis tournament played on indoor carpet courts in Manila, the Philippines. It was the first and only edition of the event and was held from 23 November through 30 November 1974. The tournament was part of the Grand Prix Circuit . Ramesh Krishnan won the singles title.

== Finals ==
=== Singles ===
(India) Ramesh Krishnan defeated (Switzerland) Ivan Dupasquier 7–6, 6–1.

=== Doubles ===
(United States) John Benson / (United States) Mike Bauer defeated (United States) Drew Gitlin / (United States) Jim Gurfein 6–4, 6–4
