= 1973 Milo International Tennis Classic =

Tennis tournament

- Date: 15–21 October
- Edition: 1st
- Category: Grand Prix (Grade C)
- Draw: 32S / 16D
- Prize money: $25,000
- Surface: Clay / outdoor
- Location: Manila, Philippines

Champions

Singles
- (Australia) Ross Case

Doubles
- (Mexico) Marcello Lara / (United States) Sherwood Stewart
- Manila Open

The 1973 Milo International Tennis Classic, also known as the Manila Open, was a men's tennis tournament played on outdoor clay courts in Manila, the Philippines. It was the inaugural edition of the event and was held from 15 October through 21 October 1973. The tournament was part of the Grade C tier of the Grand Prix tennis circuit and was the third leg of the Asian circuit. Ross Case won the singles title.

== Finals ==
=== Singles ===
(Australia) Ross Case defeated (Australia) Geoff Masters 6–1, 6–0

- It was Case's 1st singles title of the year and the 2nd of his career.

=== Doubles ===
(Mexico) Marcello Lara / (United States) Sherwood Stewart defeated (West Germany) Jürgen Fassbender / (West Germany) Hans-Jürgen Pohmann 4–6, 7–5, 7–6
