= Philippine Women's Open =

Philippine Women's Open (125)

WTA Tour
- Location: Rizal Memorial Tennis Center; Manila; Philippines
- Category: WTA 125
- Surface: Hard
- Draw: 32S / 14D
- Prize money: US$115,000 (2026)

Current champions (2026)
- Singles: (Colombia) Camila Osorio
- Doubles: (Hong Kong) Eudice Chong (Chinese Taipei) Liang En-shuo

The Philippine Women's Open (125) is a tennis tournament held in Manila, Philippines since 2026. The event is part of the WTA Tour affiliated WTA 125 tournaments and is played on outdoor hardcourts.

== History ==
The Philippine Tennis Association (PhilTA) and the state-run agency Philippine Sports Commission (PSC) planned on making the organization of a WTA 125 tournament in the Philippines possible. The plan was made known after PSC chairman Patrick Gregorio and PhilTA secretary general John Rey Tiangco met on September 29, 2025.

The tournament named Philippine Women's Open was confirmed in November 2025. The first edition was held from January 26 to 31, 2026 at the Rizal Memorial Tennis Center in Manila. PHILTA signed a three-year contract with the Women's Tennis Association.

An upcoming WTA 250 tournament will be held in Manila for the first time, in addition to the existing WTA 125 tournament which will hold its second edition in January 2027.

== Past finals ==
=== Singles ===
Year	Champion	Runners-up	Score
2026	(Colombia) Camila Osorio	(Croatia) Donna Vekić	2–6, 6–3, 7–5

=== Doubles ===
Year	Champions	Runners-up	Score
2026	(Hong Kong) Eudice Chong (Chinese Taipei) Liang En-shuo	(United States) Quinn Gleason (United States) Sabrina Santamaria	2–6, 7–6^{(7–2)}, [10–6]
