= South Pacific Championships =

South Pacific Championships may refer to:

- South Pacific Championship, a rugby union competition
- South Pacific Tennis Classic, also known as the South Pacific Championships, a men's tennis tournament
- South Pacific Athletics Championships, an athletics (track and field) meeting

== See also ==
- South Pacific Games
