= 1977 Philta International =

- Date: 14–20 November
- Edition: 5th
- Category: Grand Prix (Two Star)
- Draw: 32S / 16D
- Prize money: $75,000
- Surface: Clay/ outdoor
- Location: Manila, Philippines

Champions

Singles
- (West Germany) Karl Meiler

Doubles
- (Australia) Chris Kachel / (Australia) John Marks
- Philta International Championships

The 1977 Philta International was a men's tennis tournament played an outdoor clay courts in Manila, Philippines. It was the fifth edition of the tournament and was held from 14 November through 20 November 1977. The tournament was part of the Grand Prix tennis circuit and categorized as Two Star. Karl Meiler won the singles title and the $13,135 first prize money after first-seeded Manuel Orantes had to default due to a sprained ankle.

== Finals ==
=== Singles ===
(West Germany) Karl Meiler defeated (Spain) Manuel Orantes def.

- It was Meiler's 1st singles title of the year and the 4th and last of his career.

=== Doubles ===
(Australia) Chris Kachel / (Australia) John Marks defeated (United States) Mike Cahill / (United States) Terry Moor 4–6, 6–0, 7–6
