= Phil Davies (tennis) =

Australian tennis player

- Full name: Phil Davies
- Country (sports): Australia

Singles
- Career record: 1–6

Grand Slam singles results
- Australian Open: 1R (1979)

Doubles
- Career record: 4–4

Grand Slam doubles results
- US Open: 1R (1979)

Phil Davies is a former professional tennis player from Australia.

== Biography ==
As a junior, Davies won the boys' doubles title at the 1977 Australian Open, partnering with Peter Smylie.

Davies made all of his Grand Prix appearances in local Australian tournaments. Most notable of those was the 1979 Australian Hard Court Championships, in which he made the second round of the singles and was a losing doubles finalist with Brad Guan. He did, however, play Challenger events in the United States and partnered with American John Hayes in the men's doubles at the 1979 US Open. At the 1979 Australian Open, he made it through the qualifying draw and was beaten in the first round by Tony Roche.

He has run a tennis school in the northern Sydney suburb of Mona Vale since 1987.

== Grand Prix career finals ==
=== Doubles: 1 (0–1) ===
Result	W/L	Date	Tournament	Surface	Partner	Opponents	Score
Loss	0–1	Jan 1980	Hobart, Australia	Hard	(Australia) Brad Guan	(Australia) John James (Australia) Chris Kachel	4–6, 4–6
