= Brad Guan =

Australian tennis player (born 1958)

- Country (sports): Australia
- Born: 10 July 1958 (age 68)
- Plays: Right-handed

Singles
- Career record: 8–18
- Career titles: 0
- Highest ranking: No. 183 (3 Jan 1983)

Grand Slam singles results
- Australian Open: 3R (1982)
- French Open: 1R (1982)

Doubles
- Career record: 25–31
- Career titles: 0
- Highest ranking: No. 107 (3 Jan 1983)

Grand Slam doubles results
- Australian Open: QF (1980)
- French Open: QF (1982)
- Wimbledon: 2R (1980, 1981)
- US Open: 2R (1982)

Brad Guan (born 10 July 1958) is a former professional tennis player from Australia.

== Grand Slam career ==
Guan made his first appearance in the main singles draw of a Grand Slam at the 1981 Australian Open, where he lost in the opening round to Pat Du Pré, in five sets. He was also beaten in the first round of the 1982 French Open, by Juan Avendaño, but made the men's doubles quarter-finals, with Derek Tarr as his partner. This equaled his best Grand Slam performance, as he also reached the quarter-finals in the doubles at the 1980 Australian Open, partnering Ernie Ewart. His best singles effort came when he made the third round at the 1982 Australian Open.

== Grand Prix tour ==
On the Grand Prix tennis circuit, Guan made one doubles final, at the 1979 Australian Hard Court Tennis Championships with Phil Davies. They lost to John James and Chris Kachel. He was a singles quarter-finalist at Brisbane's South Pacific Tennis Classic in 1981.

== Challenger circuit ==
At an ATP Challenger tournament in Perth in 1982, Guan had a win over John Fitzgerald. He won five Challenger doubles titles during his career.

== Grand Prix career finals ==
=== Doubles: 1 (0–1) ===
Result	W/L	Date	Tournament	Surface	Partner	Opponents	Score
Loss	0–1	Jan 1980	Hobart, Australia	Hard	(Australia) Phil Davies	(Australia) John James (Australia) Chris Kachel	4–6, 4–6

== Challenger titles ==
=== Doubles: (5) ===
No.	Year	Tournament	Surface	Partner	Opponents	Score
1.	1980	Cozenza, Italy	Clay	(Australia) Ernie Ewert	(Egypt) Ismail El Shafei (Ecuador) Ricardo Ycaza	7–6, 6–3
2.	1980	Messina, Italy	Clay	(Australia) Ernie Ewert	(Italy) Gianni Marchetti (Italy) Enzo Vattuone	6–3, 6–4
3.	1981	Travemünde, West Germany	Clay	(Australia) Wayne Hampson	(New Zealand) Bruce Derlin (New Zealand) David Mustard	6–3, 6–4
4.	1982	Solihull, Great Britain	Clay	(India) Anand Amritraj	(United Kingdom) Andrew Jarrett (United Kingdom) Jonathan Smith	6–4, 3–6, 6–3
5.	1982	Cologne, West Germany	Clay	(Australia) Warren Maher	(Australia) Chris Johnstone (Australia) Cliff Letcher	6–2, 6–4
