= 1979 Australian Hard Court Championships =

- Date: 1–7 January
- Edition: 34th
- Category: Grand Prix circuit
- Draw: 32S / 16D
- Prize money: $50,000
- Surface: Hard / outdoor
- Location: Hobart, Australia
- Venue: Doman Tennis Centre

Champions

Singles
- (Argentina) Guillermo Vilas

Doubles
- (Australia) Phil Dent/ (Australia) Bob Giltinan
- Australian Hard Court Championships

The 1979 Australian Hard Court Championships, also known as the Tasmanian Open, was a men's tennis tournament that was played on the Grand Prix tennis circuit from 1 January until 7 January 1979. The event was held at the Doman Tennis Centre in Hobart, Australia and was played on outdoor hardcourts, this was the 35th edition. First-seeded Guillermo Vilas won the singles title and earned $8,000 first-prize money.

== Finals ==
=== Singles ===
(Argentina) Guillermo Vilas defeated (Australia) Mark Edmondson 6–4, 6–4

- It was the 1st singles title of the year and the 43rd of his career.

=== Doubles ===
(Australia) Phil Dent / (Australia) Bob Giltinan defeated (Argentina) Guillermo Vilas / (Romania) Ion Țiriac 8–6 (Pro set)
