= Rizal Memorial Tennis Center =

Tennis venue in Manila, Philippines

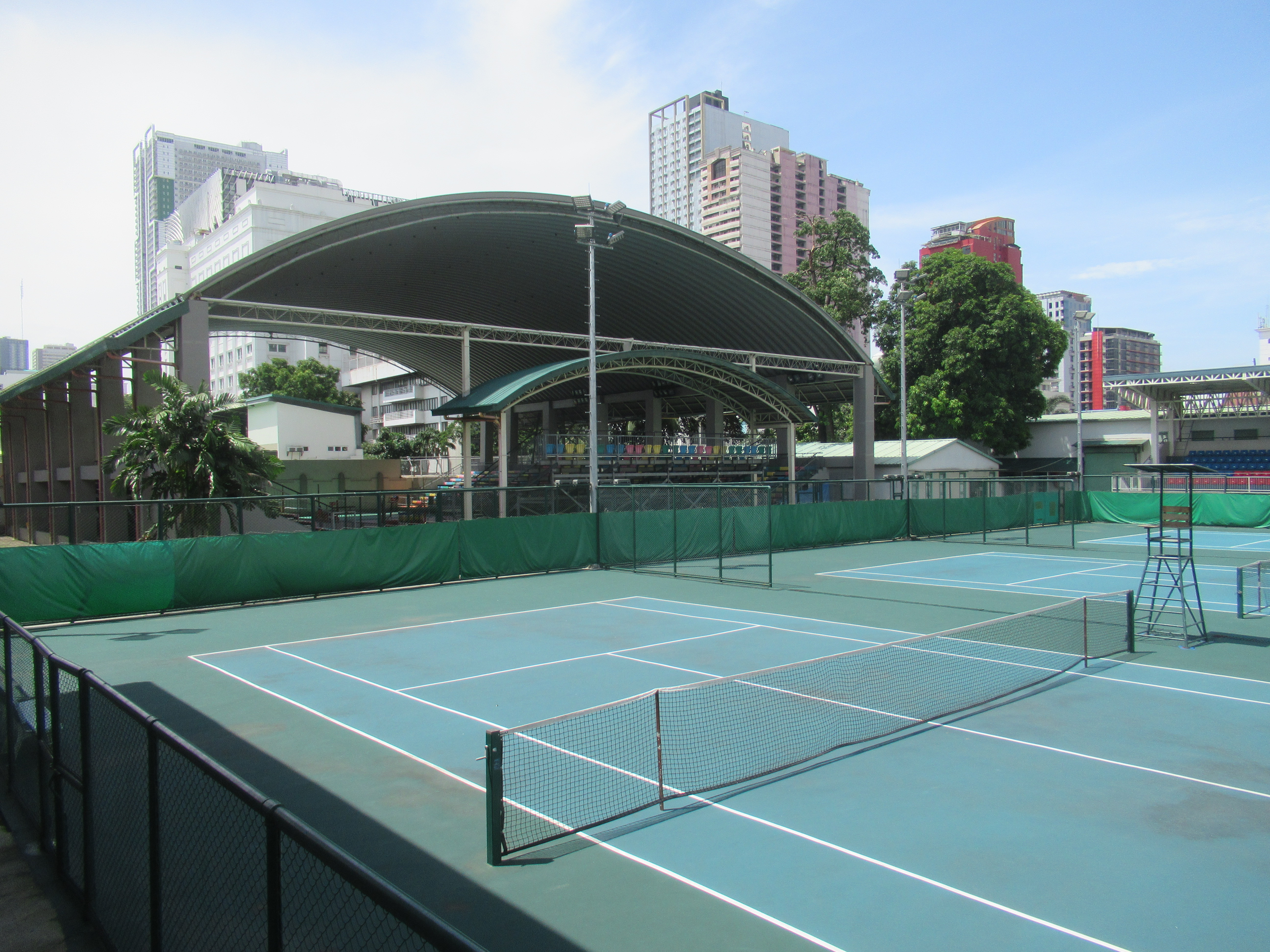
- The venue in 2023
- Address: Rizal Memorial Sports Complex; Manila; Philippines
- Owner: City Government of Manila
- Operator: Philippine Sports Commission
- Capacity: 2,000
- Surface: Hard (outdoor)

Construction
- Opened: May 4, 1987
- Renovated: 1996, 2025–26

The Rizal Memorial Tennis Center is a tennis venue within the Rizal Memorial Sports Complex.

== History ==
The Rizal Memorial Tennis Center was inaugurated on May 4, 1987.

It was refurbished for six months and was re-inaugurated on November 4, 1996. 7R Contractors installed seven acrylic-cushioned hardcourts, while Resort Sports Management built the Philippines' first synthetic grass court as a response to the Philippines' defeat to India in the 1995 Davis Cup Asia/Oceania Zone Group I. The Philippine Women's Satellite Championships is the first tournament for the renovated venue.

The Tennis Center was renovated ahead of its hosting of the Philippine Women's Open, a WTA 125 tournament, in January 2026. The seating capacity was expanded to 2,000.

== Facilities ==
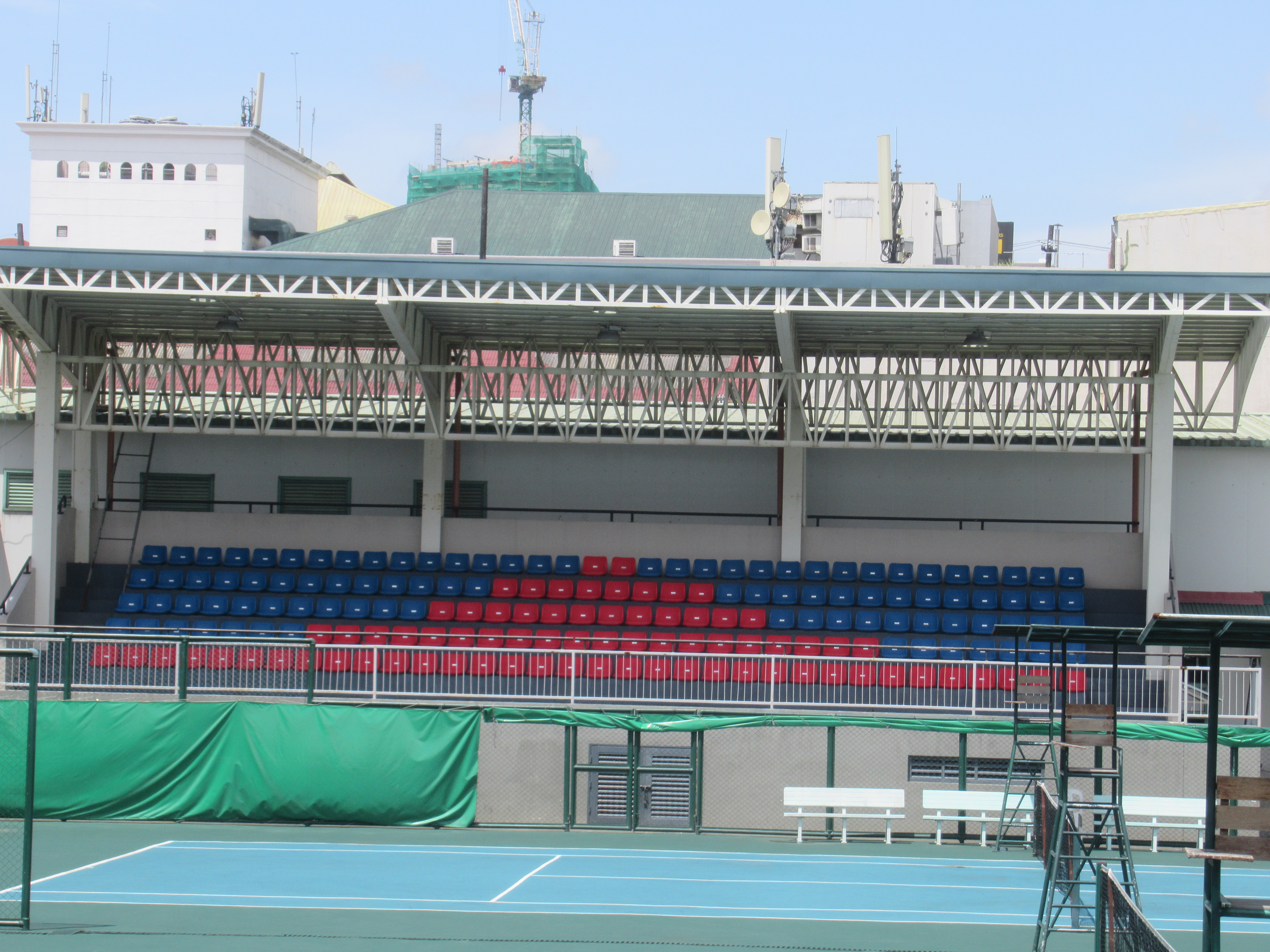
Bleachers at the Rizal Memorial Tennis Center.

As of 2016, the venue has seven tennis courts as well as bleachers providing 1,578 seats. In 2026, the seating capacity was increased to 2,000.

== Events ==
The Rizal Memorial Tennis Center has hosted games of the Davis Cup zonal tournaments, as well as the tennis tournaments of the 2019 SEA Games.

The venue had also hosted the UAAP tennis championships and the NCAA lawn tennis championships. It also hosted the Mitsubishi Lancer International Junior Tennis Championship.
