= Ulrich Marten =

German tennis player (born 1956)

- Country (sports): West Germany
- Residence: Berlin
- Born: 7 January 1956 (age 70) Werneck, West Germany
- Plays: Right-handed

Singles
- Career record: 16–41
- Career titles: 0
- Highest ranking: No. 161 (22 Dec 1980)

Grand Slam singles results
- Australian Open: 2R (1975, 1977, 1979, 1980)
- French Open: 2R (1975)
- Wimbledon: 1R (1981)

Doubles
- Career record: 29–44
- Career titles: 1

Grand Slam doubles results
- Australian Open: QF (1976)
- Wimbledon: 2R (1981)

Ulrich Marten (born 7 January 1956) is a former professional tennis player from West Germany.

== Career ==
Marten was a doubles quarterfinalist at the 1976 Australian Open, with partner Rolf Gehring.

In 1977, he had wins over both Robin Drysdale and American Mark Meyers to make the round of 16 at the South Australian Men's Tennis Classic.

He came from two sets down to defeat Cliff Letcher at the 1979 Australian Open, 8–6 in the fifth. It was one of five times that he would make the second round of a Grand Slam singles draw, but he was unable to go further.

Marten made an appearance in 1979 for the West Germany Davis Cup team, in a tie against Romania. He featured in the doubles rubber, with Jürgen Fassbender, which they lost, to Gavorielle-Traian Marcu and Ilie Năstase.

In 1980, he reached the singles quarter-finals at the Stuttgart Outdoor tournament, beating Patrice Dominguez and Ulrich Pinner.

== Grand Prix career finals ==
=== Doubles: 1 (1–0) ===
Result	W–L	Date	Tournament	Surface	Partner	Opponents	Score
Win	1–0	Jul 1980	Kitzbuhel, Austria	Clay	(West Germany) Klaus Eberhard	(Brazil) Carlos Kirmayr (New Zealand) Chris Lewis	6–4, 3–6, 6–4

== Challenger titles ==
=== Doubles: (1) ===
No.	Year	Tournament	Surface	Partner	Opponents	Score
1.	1980	Parioli, Italy	Clay	(West Germany) Klaus Eberhard	(West Germany) Karl Meiler (West Germany) Werner Zirngibl	3–6, 6–3, 7–5
