= John James (tennis) =

Australian tennis player

- Country (sports): Australia
- Born: 7 March 1951 (age 75) Adelaide, Australia
- Height: 183 cm (6 ft 0 in)
- Plays: Right-handed

Singles
- Career record: 83–135
- Career titles: 0
- Highest ranking: No. 91 (26 December 1976)

Grand Slam singles results
- Australian Open: 2R (1972, 1975, 1976, 1977 (Dec), 1978, 1979)
- French Open: 2R (1979)
- Wimbledon: 2R (1979)
- US Open: 2R (1977, 1978, 1979, 1981)

Doubles
- Career record: 130–141
- Career titles: 2
- Highest ranking: No. 349 (3 January 1983)

Grand Slam doubles results
- Australian Open: SF (1979)
- French Open: 2R (1975, 1978, 1979, 1980)
- Wimbledon: 1R (1975, 1978, 1979, 1980)
- US Open: 2R (1977, 1979)

John James (born 7 March 1951) is a right-handed former professional tennis player from Australia.

James enjoyed most of his tennis success while playing doubles. During his career, he won two doubles titles.

== Career finals ==
=== Singles (1 runner-up) ===
Result	W-L	Date	Tournament	Surface	Opponent	Score
Loss	0–1	Jul 1978	Newport, U.S.	Grass	(South Africa) Bernard Mitton	1–6, 6–3, 6–7

=== Doubles (2 titles / 7 runner-ups) ===
Result	W-L	Date	Tournament	Surface	Partner	Opponents	Score
Loss	0–1	Nov 1976	London, England	Carpet	(United Kingdom) John Feaver	(United Kingdom) David Lloyd (United Kingdom) John Lloyd	4–6, 6–3, 2–6
Loss	0–2	Oct 1977	Basel, Switzerland	Carpet	(United Kingdom) John Feaver	(United Kingdom) Mark Cox (United Kingdom) Buster Mottram	5–7, 4–6, 3–6
Loss	0–3	Jul 1978	Louisville, U.S.	Clay	(United States) Victor Amaya	(Poland) Wojciech Fibak (Paraguay) Víctor Pecci	4–6, 7–6, 4–6
Loss	0–4	Feb 1979	Sarasota, U.S.	Carpet	(United States) Keith Richardson	(United States) Steve Krulevitz (Romania) Ilie Năstase	6–7, 3–6
Loss	0–5	Jul 1979	Newport, U.S.	Grass	(Australia) Chris Kachel	(United States) Robert Lutz (United States) Stan Smith	4–6, 6–7
Loss	0–6	Dec 1979	Brisbane, Australia	Grass	(Australia) Chris Kachel	(Australia) Ross Case (Australia) Geoff Masters	6–7, 2–6
Win	1–6	Jan 1980	Hobart, Australia	Hard	(Australia) Chris Kachel	(Australia) Phil Davies (Australia) Brad Guan	6–4, 6–4
Loss	1–7	Apr 1980	Palm Harbor, U.S.	Hard	(Australia) Steve Docherty	(Australia) Paul Kronk (Australia) Paul McNamee	4–6, 5–7
Win	2–7	Jan 1981	Adelaide, Australia	Grass	(Australia) Colin Dibley	(United States) Craig Edwards (South Africa) Eddie Edwards	6–3, 6–4
