= Ernie Ewert =

Australian tennis player

- Full name: Ernie Ewert, Jr.
- Country (sports): Australia
- Born: 5 June 1954 (age 72) Melbourne, Australia

Singles
- Career record: 18–30

Grand Slam singles results
- Australian Open: 2R (1975)
- Wimbledon: 3R (1973)

Doubles
- Career record: 28–57

Grand Slam doubles results
- Australian Open: QF (1980)
- French Open: 1R (1977)
- Wimbledon: 2R (1976, 1977)

Grand Slam mixed doubles results
- Wimbledon: QF (1975)
- US Open: 1R (1972)

Ernie Ewert, Jr. (born 5 June 1954) is a former professional tennis player from Australia.

== Biography ==
Born in Melbourne in 1954, Ewert Jr was the son of a butcher, Ernie Ewert Sr, who went on to become a successful horse trainer.

Beginning on the professional circuit at the end of 1971, Ewert was coached by seven-time grand slam champion Mervyn Rose. During his career he competed in the main draw of all four grand slam tournaments. At the 1973 Wimbledon Championships he made the third round, with wins over Konstantin Pugaev and Mike Machette. As a doubles player he reached two grand slam quarter-finals, in the mixed doubles at the 1975 Wimbledon Championships with Mimmi Wikstedt and in the men's doubles partnering Brad Guan at the 1980 Australian Open.

Ewert took up his father's profession after his tennis career, working as a horse trainer.

== Challenger titles ==
=== Doubles: (4) ===
No.	Year	Tournament	Surface	Partner	Opponents	Score
1.	1979	Galatina, Italy	Clay	(Australia) Cliff Letcher	(Argentina) Gustavo Guerrero (Chile) Alejandro Pierola	6–2, 6–2
2.	1979	Biarritz, France	Clay	(Australia) Victor Eke	(France) Hervé Gauvain (France) Jérôme Vanier	6–1, 6–4, 6–1
3.	1980	Cosenza, Italy	Clay	(Australia) Brad Guan	(Egypt) Ismail El Shafei (Ecuador) Ricardo Ycaza	7–6, 6–3
4.	1980	Messina, Italy	Clay	(Australia) Brad Guan	(Italy) Gianni Marchetti (Italy) Enzo Vattuone	6–3, 6–4
