= South Pacific Tennis Classic =

Defunct tennis tournament
- Event name: South Pacific Tennis Classic
- Tour: Grand Prix circuit
- Founded: 1974
- Abolished: 1981
- Editions: 8
- Location: Melbourne, Victoria (1974–75); Brisbane, Queensland (1976–81)
- Venue: Royal South Yarra Tennis Club (1974–75); Milton Courts (1976–81)
- Surface: Clay / Grass

The South Pacific Tennis Classic, also known as the South Pacific Championships, was a men's tennis tournament played in Melbourne, Australia in 1974 and 1975, and in Brisbane, Australia from 1976 through 1981. The event was part of the Grand Prix tennis circuit and was played on outdoor grass courts from 1976.

== Past finals ==
=== Singles ===
Location	Year	Champions	Runners-up	Score
Melbourne	1974	(United States) Dick Stockton	(Australia) Geoff Masters	6–2, 6–3, 6–2
Melbourne	1975	(United States) Brian Gottfried	(United States) Harold Solomon	6–2, 7–6, 6–1
Brisbane	1976	(Australia) Mark Edmondson	(Australia) Phil Dent	3–6, 6–4, 6–4, 6–4
Brisbane	1977	(United States) Vitas Gerulaitis	(Australia) Tony Roche	6–7^{(2–7)}, 6–1, 6–1, 7–5
Brisbane	1978	(Australia) Mark Edmondson	(Australia) John Alexander	6–4, 7–6
Brisbane	1979	(Australia) Phil Dent	(Australia) Ross Case	7–6, 6–2, 6–3
Brisbane	1980	(United States) John McEnroe	(Australia) Phil Dent	6–3, 6–4
Brisbane	1981	(Australia) Mark Edmondson	(New Zealand) Chris Lewis	7–6, 3–6, 6–4

=== Doubles ===
Location	Year	Champions	Runners-up	Score
Melbourne	1974	(United States) Raz Reid (Australia) Allan Stone	(United States) Mike Estep (Australia) Paul Kronk	7–6, 6–4
Melbourne	1975	(Australia) Ross Case (Australia) Geoff Masters	(United States) Brian Gottfried (Mexico) Raúl Ramirez	6–4, 6–0
Brisbane	1976	(Australia) Syd Ball (Australia) Kim Warwick	(Egypt) Ismail El Shafei (New Zealand) Brian Fairlie	6–4, 6–4
Brisbane	1977	(United States) Vitas Gerulaitis (United States) Bill Scanlon	(Australia) Mal Anderson (Australia) Ken Rosewall	7–6, 6–4
Brisbane	1978	(Australia) John Alexander (Australia) Phil Dent	(Australia) Syd Ball (Australia) Allan Stone	6–3, 7–6
Brisbane	1979	(Australia) Ross Case (Australia) Geoff Masters	(Australia) John James (Australia) Chris Kachel	7–6, 6–2
Brisbane	1980	(United States) John McEnroe (United States) Matt Mitchell	(Australia) Phil Dent (Australia) Rod Frawley	8–6 (Note: The final consisted of one pro set.)
Brisbane	1981	(Australia) Rod Frawley (New Zealand) Chris Lewis	(Australia) Mark Edmondson (United States) Mike Estep	7–5, 4–6, 7–6
