= Syd Ball =

Australian tennis player

- Country (sports): Australia
- Born: 24 January 1950 (age 76) Sydney, Australia
- Height: 1.88 m (6 ft 2 in)
- Plays: Right-handed

Singles
- Career record: 96–161
- Career titles: 0
- Highest ranking: No. 63 (3 June 1974)

Grand Slam singles results
- Australian Open: 3R (1974, 1976, 1979)
- French Open: 1R (1978)
- Wimbledon: 2R (1972, 1973)
- US Open: 4R (1974)

Doubles
- Career record: 240–202
- Career titles: 7
- Highest ranking: No. 22 (30 August 1977)

Grand Slam doubles results
- Australian Open: F (1974)
- French Open: 3R (1971)
- Wimbledon: QF (1976, 1977)
- US Open: SF (1974, 1976)

Grand Slam mixed doubles results
- US Open: SF (1969)

Syd Ball (born 24 January 1950) is an Australian former professional tennis player.

Ball enjoyed most of his tennis success while playing doubles. During his career, he won seven doubles titles and finished runner-up an additional 14 times. Partnering Bob Giltinan, Ball finished runner-up at the 1974 Australian Open. He achieved a career-high doubles ranking of World No. 22 in 1977. In August 2000, Ball was awarded the Australian Sports Medal for his commitment to tennis.

Syd Ball is the father of former tour professional Carsten Ball.

== Career finals ==
=== Doubles: 21 (7 titles / 14 runners-up) ===
Result	W/L	Date	Tournament	Surface	Partner	Opponents	Score
Loss	0–1	Jan 1974	Australian Open, Melbourne	Grass	(Australia) Bob Giltinan	(Australia) Ross Case (Australia) Geoff Masters	7–6, 3–6, 4–6
Loss	0–2	Sep 1974	San Francisco, US	Carpet	(Australia) John Alexander	(United States) Robert Lutz (United States) Stan Smith	4–6, 6–7
Loss	0–3	Oct 1974	Christchurch, New Zealand	Hard	(Australia) Ray Ruffels	(Egypt) Ismail El Shafei (United States) Roscoe Tanner	W/O
Win	1–3	Nov 1974	Manila, Philippines	Hard	(Australia) Ross Case	(United States) Mike Estep (Mexico) Marcello Lara	6–3, 7–6, 9–7
Loss	1–4	May 1975	Bournemouth, England	Clay	(Australia) Dick Crealy	(Spain) Juan Gisbert (Spain) Manuel Orantes	6–8, 3–6
Loss	1–5	Nov 1975	Manila, Philippines	Hard	(Australia) Kim Warwick	(Australia) Ross Case (Australia) Geoff Masters	1–6, 2–6
Win	2–5	Mar 1976	Little Rock, US	Carpet	(Australia) Ray Ruffels	(Paraguay) Giuliano Pecci (Pakistan) Haroon Rahim	6–3, 6–7, 6–3
Win	3–5	Oct 1976	Brisbane, Australia	Grass	(Australia) Kim Warwick	(Egypt) Ismail El Shafei (New Zealand) Brian Fairlie	6–4, 6–4
Loss	3–6	Oct 1976	Sydney Indoor, Australia	Hard	(Australia) Kim Warwick	(Egypt) Ismail El Shafei (New Zealand) Brian Fairlie	6–4, 4–6, 6–7
Win	4–6	Jan 1977	Sydney Outdoor, Australia	Grass	(Australia) Kim Warwick	(Australia) Mark Edmondson (Australia) John Marks	6–3, 6–4
Loss	4–7	Jan 1977	Adelaide, Australia	Grass	(Australia) Kim Warwick	(Australia) Cliff Letcher (United States) Dick Stockton	3–6, 6–4, 4–6
Loss	4–8	Apr 1977	Denver, US	Carpet	(Australia) Kim Warwick	(Australia) Colin Dibley (Australia) Geoff Masters	2–6, 3–6
Win	5–8	Nov 1977	Hong Kong	Hard	(Australia) Kim Warwick	(United States) Marty Riessen (United States) Roscoe Tanner	7–6, 6–3
Win	6–8	Dec 1977	Adelaide, Australia	Grass	(Australia) Kim Warwick	(Australia) John Alexander (Australia) Phil Dent	3–6, 7–6, 6–4
Loss	6–9	Oct 1978	Brisbane, Australia	Grass	(Australia) Allan Stone	(Australia) John Alexander (Australia) Phil Dent	3–6, 6–7
Loss	6–10	Dec 1978	Sydney Outdoor, Australia	Grass	(Australia) Bob Carmichael	(United States) Hank Pfister (United States) Sherwood Stewart	4–6, 4–6
Win	7–10	Jan 1980	Perth, Australia	Hard	(Australia) Cliff Letcher	(Australia) Dale Collings (Australia) Dick Crealy	6–3, 6–4
Loss	7–11	Aug 1981	Cleveland, US	Grass	(Australia) Ross Case	(United States) Erik van Dillen (United States) Van Winitsky	4–6, 7–5, 5–7
Loss	7–12	Feb 1982	Richmond WCT, US	Carpet	(West Germany) Rolf Gehring	(Australia) Mark Edmondson (Australia) Kim Warwick	4–6, 2–6
Loss	7–13	Jul 1982	Newport, US	Grass	(Australia) Rod Frawley	(United States) John Andrews (United States) John Sadri	6–3, 6–7, 5–7
Loss	7–14	Oct 1982	Melbourne Indoor, Australia	Carpet (i)	(Australia) Rod Frawley	(Paraguay) Francisco González (United States) Matt Mitchell	6–7, 6–7
