= Chris Kachel =

Australian tennis player

- Country (sports): Australia
- Born: 19 June 1955 (age 71) Tamworth, Australia
- Plays: Right-handed

Singles
- Career record: 164-162
- Career titles: 0
- Highest ranking: No. 101 (26 December 1979)

Grand Slam singles results
- Australian Open: 3R (1979)
- French Open: 1R (1976, 1977)
- Wimbledon: 2R (1977, 1979)
- US Open: 1R (1977)

Doubles
- Career record: 126–105
- Career titles: 3
- Highest ranking: No. 39 (23 August 1977)

Grand Slam doubles results
- Australian Open: SF (1977)
- French Open: QF (1977)
- Wimbledon: QF (1973, 1978)
- US Open: SF (1976)

Chris Kachel (born 19 June 1955) is a former professional tennis player from Australia.

Kachel won the 1977 Fair Play Trophy tournament in Switzerland defeating Heinz Günthardt in a close final.

Kachel enjoyed most of his tennis success while playing doubles. During his career he won 3 doubles titles. More recently, Kachel launched a modelling career by appearing on the Australian TV Show Postcards.

== Career finals ==
=== Doubles: 11 (3 titles / 8 runner-ups) ===
Result	W/L	Date	Tournament	Surface	Partner	Opponents	Score
Loss	0–1	Dec 1975	Sydney Outdoor, Australia	Grass	(Australia) Peter McNamara	(Australia) Mark Edmondson (Australia) John Marks	1–6, 1–6
Loss	0–2	Apr 1977	Nice, France	Clay	(New Zealand) Chris Lewis	(Romania) Ion Țiriac (Argentina) Guillermo Vilas	4–6, 1–6
Loss	0–3	Jul 1977	Kitzbühel, Austria	Clay	(Switzerland) Colin Dowdeswell	(United Kingdom) Buster Mottram (United Kingdom) Roger Taylor	6–7, 4–6
Loss	0–4	Aug 1977	Louisville, U.S.	Clay	(Australia) Cliff Letcher	(Australia) John Alexander (Australia) Phil Dent	1–6, 4–6
Loss	0–5	Nov 1977	Tokyo Outdoor, Japan	Clay	(Australia) Colin Dibley	(Australia) Geoff Masters (Australia) Kim Warwick	2–6, 6–7
Win	1–5	Nov 1977	Manila, Philippines	Hard	(Australia) John Marks	(United States) Mike Cahill (United States) Terry Moor	4–6, 6–0, 7–6
Loss	1–6	Nov 1978	Manila, Philippines	Clay	(Australia) Ross Case	(United States) Sherwood Stewart (United States) Brian Teacher	3–6, 6–7
Loss	1–7	Jul 1979	Newport, U.S.	Grass	(Australia) John James	(United States) Robert Lutz (United States) Stan Smith	4–6, 6–7
Loss	1–8	Jul 1979	Brisbane, Australia	Grass	(Australia) John James	(Australia) Ross Case (Australia) Geoff Masters	6–7, 2–6
Win	2–8	Dec 1979	Adelaide, Australia	Grass	(Australia) Colin Dibley	(Australia) John Alexander (Australia) Phil Dent	6–7, 7–6, 6–4
Win	3–8	Jan 1980	Hobart, Australia	Hard	(Australia) John James	(Australia) Phil Davies (Australia) Brad Guan	6–4, 6–4
