= Ross Case =

Australian former tennis player (born 1951)

- Country (sports): Australia
- Residence: Toowoomba, Queensland, Australia
- Born: 1 November 1951 (age 74) Toowoomba, Queensland, Australia
- Turned pro: 1969 (amateur from 1968)
- Retired: 1983
- Plays: Right-handed (1-handed backhand)

Singles
- Career record: 255–247
- Career titles: 5
- Highest ranking: No. 14 (25 April 1976)

Grand Slam singles results
- Australian Open: SF (1974)
- French Open: 3R (1979)
- Wimbledon: 4R (1971)
- US Open: 4R (1973)

Doubles
- Career record: 356–241
- Career titles: 20
- Highest ranking: No. 15 (1 March 1976)

Grand Slam doubles results
- Australian Open: W (1974)
- French Open: F (1979)
- Wimbledon: W (1977)
- US Open: QF (1974)

Ross Case (born 1 November 1951) is an Australian former tennis player. His career-high singles ranking was world No. 14. During his career he won 5 singles and 20 doubles titles.

With Geoff Masters, he won two Grand Slam doubles titles: in 1974 at the Australian Open and in 1977 at Wimbledon. He was also runner-up in 1976 at Wimbledon. He played in the Australian Davis Cup team in 1971, 1972, 1976, 1978, and 1979.

== Career finals ==
=== Singles 10 (5 wins / 5 losses) ===
Result	W/L	Date	Tournament	Surface	Opponent	Score
Win	1–0	Aug 1969	Seattle, U.S.	Hard	(United States) Warren Farmer	3–6, 6–1, 6–3
Loss	1–1	Aug 1971	Hilversum, Netherlands	Clay	(United Kingdom) Gerald Battrick	3–6, 4–6, 7–9
Win	2–1	Oct 1973	Manila, Philippines	Hard	(Australia) Geoff Masters	6–1, 6–0
Loss	2–2	Nov 1973	Jakarta, Indonesia	Hard	(Australia) John Newcombe	6–7, 6–7, 3–6
Win	3–2	Sep 1974	San Francisco, U.S.	Carpet	(United States) Arthur Ashe	6–3, 5–7, 6–4
Loss	3–3	May 1975	Las Vegas, U.S.	Hard	(United States) Roscoe Tanner	7–5, 5–7, 6–7
Win	4–3	Nov 1975	Manila, Philippines	Hard	(Italy) Corrado Barazzutti	6–3, 6–1
Win	5–3	Dec 1975	Sydney, Australia	Grass	(Australia) John Marks	6–2, 6–1
Loss	5–4	Apr 1976	Denver WCT, U.S.	Carpet	(United States) Jimmy Connors	6–7, 2–6
Loss	5–5	Oct 1979	Brisbane, Australia	Grass	(Australia) Phil Dent	6–7, 2–6, 3–6

=== Doubles 41 (20 wins / 21 losses) ===
Result	W–L	Date	Tournament	Surface	Partner	Opponents	Score
Loss	0–1	Jan 1972	Australian Open, Melbourne	Grass	(Australia) Geoff Masters	(Australia) Owen Davidson (Australia) Ken Rosewall	6–3, 6–7, 3–6
Win	1–1	Sep 1972	Seattle, U.S.	Hard	(Australia) Geoff Masters	(France) Jean-Baptiste Chanfreau (France) Wanaro N'Godrella	4–6, 7–6, 6–4
Win	2–1	Dec 1972	Brisbane, Australia	Hard	(Australia) Geoff Masters	(France) Georges Goven (France) Wanaro N'Godrella	6–2, 6–7, 6–2, 7–6
Loss	2–2	Jun 1973	Rome, Italy	Clay	(Australia) Geoff Masters	(Australia) John Newcombe (Netherlands) Tom Okker	2–6, 3–6, 4–6
Win	3–2	Jul 1973	Washington, D.C., U.S.	Clay	(Australia) Geoff Masters	(Australia) Dick Crealy (Rhodesia) Andrew Pattison	2–6, 6–1, 6–4
Loss	3–3	Oct 1973	Tehran, Iran	Clay	(Australia) Geoff Masters	(Australia) Rod Laver (Australia) John Newcombe	6–7, 2–6
Win	4–3	Jan 1974	Australian Open, Melbourne	Grass	(Australia) Geoff Masters	(Australia) Syd Ball (Australia) Bob Giltinan	6–7, 6–3, 6–4
Loss	4–4	Feb 1974	Hempstead WCT, New York	Hard	(Australia) Geoff Masters	(United States) Jeff Borowiak (Australia) Dick Crealy	7–6, 4–6, 4–6
Loss	4–5	Apr 1974	St. Louis, U.S.	Clay	(Australia) Geoff Masters	(Egypt) Ismail El Shafei (New Zealand) Brian Fairlie	6–7, 7–6, 6–7
Win	5–5	Sep 1974	Los Angeles, U.S.	Hard	(Australia) Geoff Masters	(United States) Brian Gottfried (Mexico) Raúl Ramírez	6–3, 6–2
Win	6–5	Oct 1974	Sydney Indoor, Australia	Hard (i)	(Australia) Geoff Masters	(Australia) John Newcombe (Australia) Tony Roche	6–4, 6–4
Win	7–5	Nov 1974	Manila, Philippines	Hard	(Australia) Syd Ball	(United States) Mike Estep (Mexico) Marcello Lara	6–3, 7–6, 9–7
Win	8–5	Mar 1975	São Paulo WCT, Brazil	Carpet	(Australia) Geoff Masters	(United States) Brian Gottfried (Mexico) Raúl Ramírez	6–7, 7–6, 7–6
Win	9–5	Mar 1975	Caracas WCT, Venezuela	Hard	(Australia) Geoff Masters	(United States) Brian Gottfried (Mexico) Raúl Ramírez	7–5, 4–6, 6–2
Loss	9–6	Apr 1975	St. Louis, U.S.	Clay	(Australia) Geoff Masters	(Australia) Colin Dibley (Australia) Ray Ruffels	4–6, 4–6
Win	10–6	Oct 1975	Melbourne Indoor, Australia	Grass	(Australia) Geoff Masters	(United States) Brian Gottfried (Mexico) Raúl Ramírez	6–4, 6–0
Loss	10–7	Oct 1975	Sydney Indoor, Australia	Hard (i)	(Australia) Geoff Masters	(United States) Brian Gottfried (Mexico) Raúl Ramírez	4–6, 2–6
Loss	10–8	Oct 1975	Perth, Australia	Hard	(Australia) Geoff Masters	(United States) Brian Gottfried (Mexico) Raúl Ramírez	6–2, 4–6, 4–6, 0–6
Win	11–8	Nov 1975	Manila, Philippines	Hard	(Australia) Geoff Masters	(Australia) Syd Ball (Australia) Kim Warwick	6–1, 6–2
Loss	11–9	Jan 1976	Australian Open, Melbourne	Grass	(Australia) Geoff Masters	(Australia) John Newcombe (Australia) Tony Roche	6–7, 4–6
Loss	11–10	Jan 1976	Monterrey WCT, Mexico	Carpet	(Australia) Geoff Masters	(United States) Brian Gottfried (Mexico) Raúl Ramírez	2–6, 6–4, 3–6
Loss	11–11	Mar 1976	Jackson WCT, U.S.	Carpet	(Australia) Geoff Masters	(United States) Brian Gottfried (Mexico) Raúl Ramírez	5–7, 6–4, 0–6
Win	12–11	Apr 1976	São Paulo WCT, Brazil	Carpet	(Australia) Geoff Masters	(United States) Charlie Pasarell (Australia) Allan Stone	7–5, 6–1
Loss	12–12	Jul 1976	Wimbledon, UK	Grass	(Australia) Geoff Masters	(Australia) Owen Davidson (Australia) Ken Rosewall	6–3, 3–6, 6–8, 6–2, 5–7
Win	13–12	Nov 1976	Manila, Philippines	Hard	(Australia) Geoff Masters	(India) Anand Amritraj (Italy) Corrado Barazzutti	6–0, 6–1
Loss	13–13	Jan 1977	Baltimore, U.S.	Carpet	(Czechoslovakia) Jan Kodeš	(Romania) Ion Țiriac (Argentina) Guillermo Vilas	3–6, 7–6, 4–6
Loss	13–14	Feb 1977	Richmond WCT, U.S.	Carpet	(Australia) Tony Roche	(Poland) Wojciech Fibak (Netherlands) Tom Okker	4–6, 4–6
Loss	13–15	Feb 1977	Toronto Indoor WCT, Canada	Carpet	(Australia) Tony Roche	(Poland) Wojciech Fibak (Netherlands) Tom Okker	4–6, 1–6
Win	14–15	Mar 1977	Monterrey WCT, Mexico	Carpet	(Poland) Wojciech Fibak	(United States) Billy Martin (United States) Bill Scanlon	3–6, 6–3, 6–4
Win	15–15	Jul 1977	Wimbledon, UK	Grass	(Australia) Geoff Masters	(Australia) John Alexander (Australia) Phil Dent	6–3, 6–4, 3–6, 8–9, 6–4
Loss	15–16	Oct 1977	Sydney Indoor, Australia	Hard (i)	(Australia) Geoff Masters	(Australia) John Newcombe (Australia) Tony Roche	7–6, 3–6, 1–6
Win	16–16	Oct 1978	Tokyo Outdoor, Japan	Clay	(Australia) Geoff Masters	(Socialist Federal Republic of Yugoslavia) Željko Franulović (United Kingdom) Buster Mottram	6–2, 4–6, 6–1
Win	17–16	Nov 1978	Tokyo Indoor, Japan	Carpet	(Australia) Geoff Masters	(United States) Pat Du Pré (United States) Tom Gorman	6–3, 6–4
Loss	17–17	Nov 1978	Manila, Philippines	Clay	(Australia) Chris Kachel	(United States) Sherwood Stewart (United States) Brian Teacher	3–6, 6–7
Loss	17–18	Apr 1979	Dayton, U.S.	Carpet	(Australia) Phil Dent	(South Africa) Cliff Drysdale (United States) Bruce Manson	6–3, 3–6, 6–7
Loss	17–19	Jun 1979	French Open, Paris	Clay	(Australia) Phil Dent	(United States) Gene Mayer (United States) Sandy Mayer	4–6, 4–6, 4–6
Win	18–19	Oct 1979	Brisbane, Australia	Grass	(Australia) Geoff Masters	(Australia) John James (Australia) Chris Kachel	7–6, 6–2
Win	19–19	Oct 1980	Guangzhou, China	Carpet	(Chile) Jaime Fillol	(United States) Andy Kohlberg (United States) Larry Stefanki	6–2, 7–6
Win	20–19	Oct 1980	Tokyo Outdoor, Japan	Clay	(Chile) Jaime Fillol	(United States) Terry Moor (United States) Eliot Teltscher	6–3, 3–6, 6–4
Loss	20–20	Mar 1981	Mexico City, Mexico	Clay	(Australia) John Alexander	(United States) Marty Davis (United States) Chris Dunk	3–6, 4–6
Loss	20–21	Aug 1981	Cleveland, U.S.	Hard	(Australia) Syd Ball	(United States) Erik Van Dillen (United States) Van Winitsky	4–6, 7–5, 5–7
