= Geoff Masters =

Australian tennis player

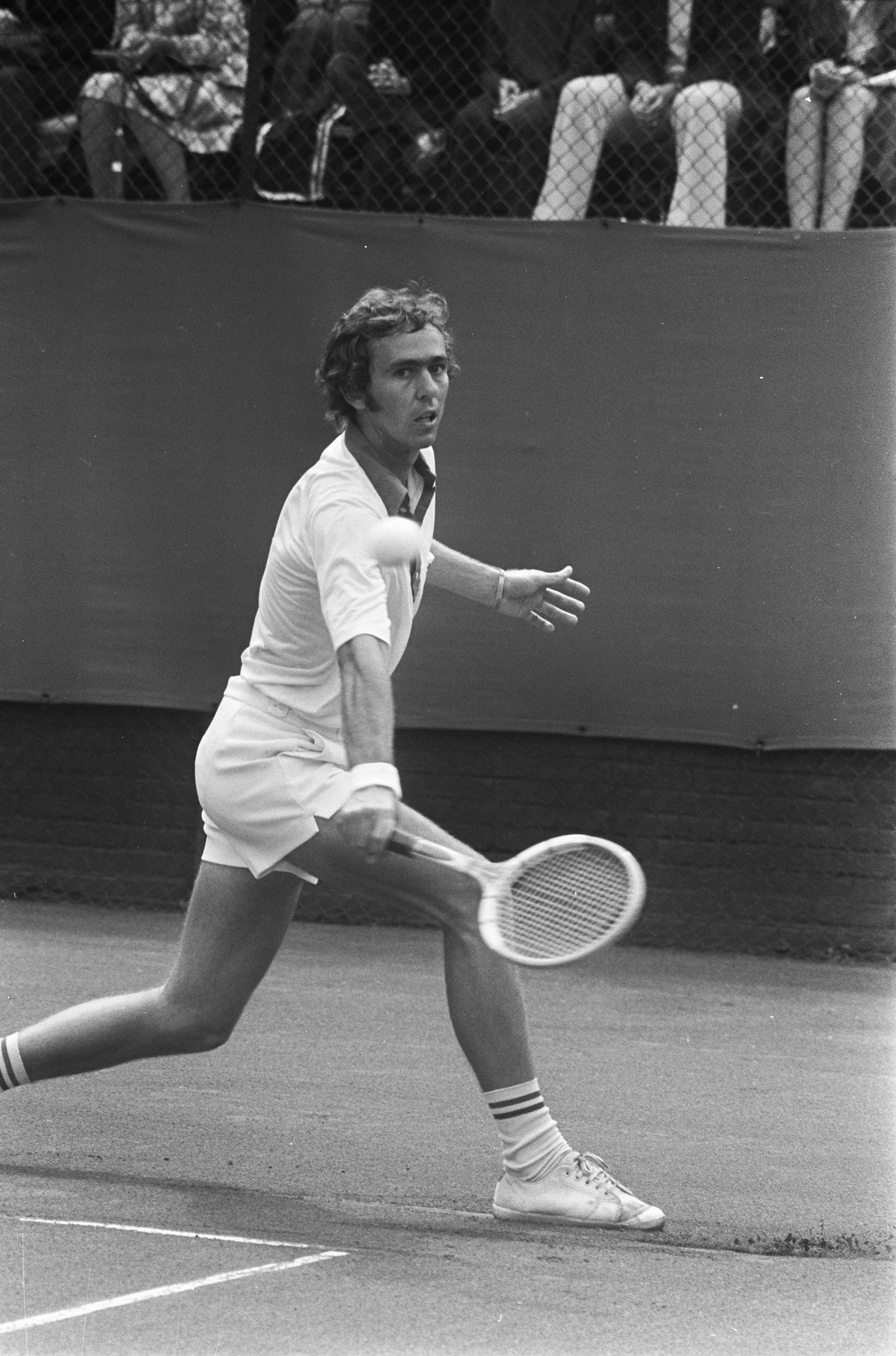
- Full name: Geoffrey Masters
- Country (sports): Australia
- Residence: Queensland, Australia
- Born: 19 September 1950 (age 76) Brisbane, Australia
- Turned pro: 1969 (amateur from 1967)
- Retired: 1981
- Plays: Right-handed (one-handed backhand)

Singles
- Career record: 245–253
- Career titles: 2
- Highest ranking: No. 41 (16 November 1975)

Grand Slam singles results
- Australian Open: QF (1975)
- French Open: 2R (1970, 1971, 1972, 1973)
- Wimbledon: 4R (1978)
- US Open: 3R (1974)

Other tournaments
- WCT Finals: QF (1979)

Doubles
- Career record: 358–204
- Career titles: 23
- Highest ranking: No. 13 (1 March 1976)

Grand Slam doubles results
- Australian Open: W (1974)
- French Open: QF (1976)
- Wimbledon: W (1977)
- US Open: QF (1974)

Grand Slam mixed doubles results
- US Open: W (1974)

Geoff Masters (born 19 September 1950) is an Australian former tennis player. He was part of doubles winning pairs in the US Open, Australian Open & Wimbledon tournaments during the 1970s, currently Masters is a commentator for international telecasts of tennis majors, such as the Australian Open which he has done for more than 20 years, originally with host broadcaster the Seven Network.

== Tennis career ==
Born in Brisbane, Queensland, Masters with Pam Teeguarden won the mixed doubles at the US Open in 1974. That year he also won the Australian Open's men's doubles with Ross Case. With the same partner Masters won the doubles event at Wimbledon in 1977.

== Career finals ==
=== Singles: 8 (2 wins / 6 losses) ===
| Result | W/L | Date | Tournament | Surface | Opponent | Score |
|---|---|---|---|---|---|---|
| Loss | 0–1 | Dec 1972 | Brisbane, Australia | Grass | (Australia) Ken Rosewall | 2–6, 7–5, 4–6, 6–3, 5–7 |
| Loss | 0–2 | Oct 1973 | Manila, Philippines | Clay | (Australia) Ross Case | 1–6, 0–6 |
| Loss | 0–3 | Oct 1974 | Melbourne, Australia | Grass | (United States) Dick Stockton | 2–6, 3–6, 2–6 |
| Win | 1–3 | Dec 1974 | Hobart, Australia | Hard | (Japan) Toshiro Sakai | 6–4, 7–6 |
| Loss | 1–4 | Feb 1975 | Dayton, U.S. | Carpet (i) | (United States) Brian Gottfried | 4–6, 6–4, 4–6 |
| Win | 2–4 | Oct 1976 | Sydney Indoor, Australia | Hard (i) | (United States) James Delaney | 4–6, 6–3, 7–6, 6–3 |
| Loss | 2–5 | Oct 1977 | Perth, Australia | Hard | (United States) Vitas Gerulaitis | 3–6, 4–6, 2–6 |
| Loss | 2–6 | Oct 1978 | Sydney Indoor, Australia | Hard (i) | (United States) Jimmy Connors | 0–6, 0–6, 4–6 |

=== Doubles: 41 (23 wins / 18 losses) ===
| Result | W–L | Date | Tournament | Surface | Partner | Opponents | Score |
|---|---|---|---|---|---|---|---|
| Loss | 0–1 | Jan 1972 | Australian Open, Melbourne | Grass | (Australia) Ross Case | (Australia) Owen Davidson (Australia) Ken Rosewall | 6–3, 6–7, 3–6 |
| Loss | 0–2 | Jul 1972 | Kitzbühel Austria | Clay | (Australia) Mal Anderson | (West Germany) Jürgen Fassbender (West Germany) Hans-Jürgen Pohmann | 6–7, 4–6, 4–6 |
| Win | 1–2 | Sep 1972 | Seattle, US | Hard | (Australia) Ross Case | (France) Jean-Baptiste Chanfreau (France) Wanaro N'Godrella | 4–6, 7–6, 6–4 |
| Win | 2–2 | Dec 1972 | Brisbane, Australia | Hard | (Australia) Ross Case | (France) Georges Goven (France) Wanaro N'Godrella | 6–2, 6–7, 6–2, 7–6 |
| Loss | 2–3 | Jun 1973 | Rome Italy | Clay | (Australia) Ross Case | (Australia) John Newcombe (Netherlands) Tom Okker | 2–6, 3–6, 4–6 |
| Win | 3–3 | Jul 1973 | Washington, D.C., US | Clay | (Australia) Ross Case | (Australia) Dick Crealy (Rhodesia) Andrew Pattison | 2–6, 6–1, 6–4 |
| Loss | 3–4 | Oct 1973 | Tehran, Iran | Clay | (Australia) Ross Case | (Australia) Rod Laver (Australia) John Newcombe | 6–7, 2–6 |
| Win | 4–4 | Jan 1974 | Australian Open, Melbourne | Grass | (Australia) Ross Case | (Australia) Syd Ball (Australia) Bob Giltinan | 6–7, 6–3, 6–4 |
| Loss | 4–5 | Feb 1974 | Hempstead, US | Hard | (Australia) Ross Case | (United States) Jeff Borowiak (Australia) Dick Crealy | 7–6, 4–6, 4–6 |
| Loss | 4–6 | Apr 1974 | St. Louis, US | Clay | (Australia) Ross Case | (Egypt) Ismail El Shafei (New Zealand) Brian Fairlie | 6–7, 7–6, 6–7 |
| Win | 5–6 | Sep 1974 | Los Angeles, US | Hard | (Australia) Ross Case | (United States) Brian Gottfried (Mexico) Raúl Ramírez | 6–3, 6–2 |
| Win | 6–6 | Oct 1974 | Sydney, Australia | Hard (i) | (Australia) Ross Case | (Australia) John Newcombe (Australia) Tony Roche | 6–4, 6–4 |
| Win | 7–6 | Mar 1975 | São Paulo WCT, Brazil | Carpet | (Australia) Ross Case | (United States) Brian Gottfried (Mexico) Raúl Ramírez | 6–7, 7–6, 7–6 |
| Win | 8–6 | Mar 1975 | Caracas WCT, Venezuela | Hard | (Australia) Ross Case | (United States) Brian Gottfried (Mexico) Raúl Ramírez | 7–5, 4–6, 6–2 |
| Loss | 8–7 | Apr 1975 | St. Louis, US | Clay | (Australia) Ross Case | (Australia) Colin Dibley (Australia) Ray Ruffels | 4–6, 4–6 |
| Win | 9–7 | Oct 1975 | Melbourne Indoor, Australia | Grass | (Australia) Ross Case | (United States) Brian Gottfried (Mexico) Raúl Ramírez | 6–4, 6–0 |
| Loss | 9–8 | Oct 1975 | Sydney Indoor, Australia | Hard (i) | (Australia) Ross Case | (United States) Brian Gottfried (Mexico) Raúl Ramírez | 4–6, 2–6 |
| Loss | 9–9 | Oct 1975 | Perth, Australia | Hard | (Australia) Ross Case | (United States) Brian Gottfried (Mexico) Raúl Ramírez | 6–2, 4–6, 4–6, 0–6 |
| Win | 10–9 | Nov 1975 | Manila, Philippines | Hard | (Australia) Ross Case | (Australia) Syd Ball (Australia) Kim Warwick | 6–1, 6–2 |
| Loss | 10–10 | Jan 1976 | Australian Open, Melbourne | Grass | (Australia) Ross Case | (Australia) John Newcombe (Australia) Tony Roche | 6–7, 4–6 |
| Loss | 10–11 | Jan 1976 | Monterrey WCT, Mexico | Carpet | (Australia) Ross Case | (United States) Brian Gottfried (Mexico) Raúl Ramírez | 2–6, 6–4, 3–6 |
| Loss | 10–12 | Mar 1976 | Jackson WCT, US | Carpet | (Australia) Ross Case | (United States) Brian Gottfried (Mexico) Raúl Ramírez | 5–7, 6–4, 0–6 |
| Win | 11–12 | Apr 1976 | São Paulo WCT, Brazil | Carpet | (Australia) Ross Case | (United States) Charlie Pasarell (Australia) Allan Stone | 7–5, 6–1 |
| Loss | 11–13 | May 1976 | Rome, Italy | Clay | (Australia) John Newcombe | (United States) Brian Gottfried (Mexico) Raúl Ramírez | 6–7, 7–5, 3–6, 6–3, 3–6 |
| Loss | 11–14 | Jul 1976 | Wimbledon, UK | Grass | (Australia) Ross Case | (Australia) Owen Davidson (Australia) Ken Rosewall | 6–3, 3–6, 6–8, 6–2, 5–7 |
| Win | 12–14 | Nov 1976 | Manila, Philippines | Hard | (Australia) Ross Case | (India) Anand Amritraj (Italy) Corrado Barazzutti | 6–0, 6–1 |
| Loss | 12–15 | Feb 1977 | San Jose, US | Carpet | (United States) Tom Gorman | (South Africa) Bob Hewitt (South Africa) Frew McMillan | 2–6, 3–6 |
| Win | 13–15 | Apr 1977 | Denver, US | Carpet | (Australia) Colin Dibley | (Australia) Syd Ball (Australia) Kim Warwick | 6–2, 6–3 |
| Win | 14–15 | Jul 1977 | Wimbledon, UK | Grass | (Australia) Ross Case | (Australia) John Alexander (Australia) Phil Dent | 6–3, 6–4, 3–6, 8–9, 6–4 |
| Loss | 14–16 | Oct 1977 | Sydney Indoor, Australia | Hard (i) | (Australia) Ross Case | (Australia) John Newcombe (Australia) Tony Roche | 7–6, 3–6, 1–6 |
| Win | 15–16 | Nov 1977 | Tokyo Outdoor, Japan | Clay | (Australia) Kim Warwick | (Australia) Colin Dibley (Australia) Chris Kachel | 6–2, 7–6 |
| Win | 16–16 | Jan 1978 | Sarasota, US | Carpet | (Switzerland) Colin Dowdeswell | (South Africa) Byron Bertram (South Africa) Bernard Mitton | 2–6, 6–3, 6–2 |
| Win | 17–16 | Feb 1978 | Little Rock, US | Carpet | (Australia) Colin Dibley | (United States) Tim Gullikson (United States) Tom Gullikson | 7–6, 6–3 |
| Win | 18–16 | Apr 1978 | Dayton, US | Carpet | (United States) Brian Gottfried | (United States) Hank Pfister (United States) Butch Walts | 6–3, 6–4 |
| Loss | 18–17 | Apr 1978 | Johannesburg, South Africa | Hard | (Australia) Colin Dibley | (South Africa) Bob Hewitt (South Africa) Frew McMillan | 5–7, 6–7 |
| Win | 19–17 | Oct 1978 | Tokyo Outdoor, Japan | Clay | (Australia) Ross Case | (Socialist Federal Republic of Yugoslavia) Željko Franulović (United Kingdom) Buster Mottram | 6–2, 4–6, 6–1 |
| Win | 20–17 | Nov 1978 | Tokyo Indoor, Japan | Carpet | (Australia) Ross Case | (United States) Pat DuPré (United States) Tom Gorman | 6–3, 6–4 |
| Loss | 20–18 | Apr 1979 | Houston, US | Clay | (Australia) John Alexander | (United States) Gene Mayer (United States) Sherwood Stewart | 1–6, 7–5, 4–6 |
| Win | 21–18 | Oct 1979 | Brisbane, Australia | Grass | (Australia) Ross Case | (Australia) John James (Australia) Chris Kachel | 7–6, 6–2 |
| Win | 22–18 | Mar 1980 | Dayton, US | Carpet | (Poland) Wojciech Fibak | (United States) Fritz Buehning (United States) Fred McNair | 6–4, 6–4 |
| Win | 23–18 | Jun 1980 | London/Queen's Club, UK | Grass | (Australia) Rod Frawley | (Australia) Paul McNamee (United States) Sherwood Stewart | 6–2, 4–6, 11–9 |

== Post-tennis playing career ==
Masters can be heard calling Australian Open and Wimbledon matches for rights holder the Nine Network in Australia.
