= Cliff Letcher =

Australian tennis player

- Country (sports): Australia; Austria
- Born: 9 February 1952 Pyramid Hill, Australia
- Died: 31 December 2004 (aged 52)
- Plays: Right-handed
- Coach: Don Tregonning

Singles
- Career record: 54–112

Doubles
- Career record: 147–153

Grand Slam doubles results
- Australian Open: F (1978, 1979)
- French Open: 2R (1977)
- Wimbledon: QF (1979)
- US Open: F (1976)

Cliff Letcher (9 February 1952 – 31 December 2004) was a professional tennis player from Australia. He played Davis Cup for Austria.

Letcher enjoyed most of his tennis success while playing doubles. During his career, he won two doubles titles and finished runner-up in doubles at three Grand Slam events.

Letcher died on 31 December 2004.

His children Clint, Chris and Sophie Letcher were also professional tennis players.

== Career finals ==
=== Doubles: 11 (2 wins / 9 losses) ===
Result	W/L	Date	Tournament	Surface	Partner	Opponents	Score
Loss	0–1	Sep 1976	U.S. Open, New York City	Clay	(Australia) Paul Kronk	(United States) Marty Riessen (Netherlands) Tom Okker	4–6, 4–6
Win	1–1	Jan 1977	Adelaide, Australia	Grass	(United States) Dick Stockton	(Australia) Syd Ball (Australia) Kim Warwick	6–3, 4–6, 6–4
Loss	1–2	Feb 1977	Miami, U.S.	Clay	(Australia) Paul Kronk	(United States) Brian Gottfried (Mexico) Raúl Ramírez	5–7, 4–6
Loss	1–3	Mar 1977	Hampton, U.S.	Carpet	(Australia) Paul Kronk	(United States) Sandy Mayer (United States) Stan Smith	4–6, 3–6
Loss	1–4	May 1977	Düsseldorf, Germany	Clay	(Australia) Paul Kronk	(West Germany) Jürgen Fassbender (West Germany) Karl Meiler	3–6, 3–6
Loss	1–5	Aug 1977	Louisville, U.S.	Clay	(Australia) Chris Kachel	(Australia) John Alexander (Australia) Phil Dent	1–6, 4–6
Loss	1–6	Aug 1977	Indianapolis, U.S.	Clay	(Australia) Dick Crealy	(Chile) Patricio Cornejo (Chile) Jaime Fillol	7–6, 4–6, 3–6
Loss	1–7	Jan 1979	Australian Open, Melbourne	Grass	(Australia) Paul Kronk	(Poland) Wojciech Fibak (Australia) Kim Warwick	6–7, 5–7
Loss	1–8	Jan 1980	Australian Open, Melbourne	Grass	(Australia) Paul Kronk	(Australia) Peter McNamara (Australia) Paul McNamee	6–7, 2–6
Win	2–8	Jan 1980	Perth, Australia	Grass	(Australia) Syd Ball	(Australia) Dale Collings (Australia) Dick Crealy	6–3, 6–4
Loss	2–9	Dec 1982	Sydney Outdoor, Australia	Grass	(Australia) Craig Miller	(Australia) John Alexander (Australia) John Fitzgerald	4–6, 6–7
