= 1979 Wimbledon Championships – Men's singles qualifying =

Men's singles qualifying
- 1979 Wimbledon Championships

Events
Singles	men	women		boys	girls
Doubles	men	women	mixed	boys	girls
WC Singles	men	women	quad
WC Doubles	men	women	quad
Legends	men	women	seniors

Qualification
Singles	men	women
Doubles	men	women	mixed
- Wimbledon Championships

Players who neither had high enough rankings nor received wild cards to enter the main draw of the annual Wimbledon Tennis Championships participated in a qualifying tournament held one week before the event. Several players withdrew from the main draw after qualifying had commenced, leading to the highest ranked players who lost in the final qualifying round to be entered into the main draw as lucky losers.

== Seeds ==
1. (France) Gilles Moretton (qualified)
2. (Australia) Brad Drewett (qualified)
3. (United States) Richard Meyer (qualified)
4. (Australia) Bob Giltinan (qualified)
5. (South Africa) John Yuill (qualifying competition, lucky loser)
6. (Australia) Noel Phillips (qualifying competition, lucky loser)
7. (United States) Rick Fisher (qualified)
8. (New Zealand) Onny Parun (qualified)
9. (Peru) Fernando Maynetto (second round)
10. (Chile) Álvaro Fillol (qualifying competition, lucky loser)
11. (United States) Bill Maze (first round)
12. (Sweden) Jan Norbäck (qualified)
13. (Australia) Charlie Fancutt (second round)
14. (Sweden) Ulf Eriksson (qualified)
15. (Australia) Cliff Letcher (qualified)
16. (Brazil) Cássio Motta (qualified)
17. (United States) Brad Rowe (second round)
18. (Canada) Richard Legendre (second round)
19. (United States) Peter Pearson (qualifying competition)
20. (United Kingdom) John Paish (second round)
21. (United States) Tony Graham (qualifying competition)
22. (United States) Jon Molin (second round)
23. (Netherlands) Paul van Min (first round)
24. (Japan) Tsuyoshi Fukui (qualifying competition)
25. (Australia) Victor Eke (first round)
26. (Japan) Shigeyuki Nishio (first round)
27. (Spain) Gabriel Urpí (second round)
28. (Brazil) Thomaz Koch (qualifying competition)
29. (Colombia) Alejandro Cortes (qualified)
30. (United States) Charlie Pasarell (qualified)
31. (Australia) Syd Ball (second round)
32. (Australia) Greg Braun (second round)

== Qualifiers ==
1. (France) Gilles Moretton
2. (Australia) Brad Drewett
3. (United States) Richard Meyer
4. (Australia) Bob Giltinan
5. (United Kingdom) Rohun Beven
6. (United States) Fritz Buehning
7. (United States) Rick Fisher
8. (New Zealand) Onny Parun
9. (Australia) John Fitzgerald
10. (Colombia) Alejandro Cortes
11. (Australia) David Whyte
12. (Sweden) Jan Norbäck
13. (United States) Charlie Pasarell
14. (Sweden) Ulf Eriksson
15. (Australia) Cliff Letcher
16. (Brazil) Cássio Motta

== Lucky losers ==
1. (Australia) Noel Phillips
2. (Chile) Álvaro Fillol
3. (South Africa) John Yuill

== Qualifying draw ==
Key

- Q = Qualifier
- WC = Wild card
- LL = Lucky loser
- Alt = Alternate
- ITF = ITF entry
- PR = Protected ranking
- SR = Special ranking
- SE = Special exempt
- JE = Junior exempt
- JR = Junior Accelerator Programme entrant
- CO = College Accelerator Programme entrant
- NG = Next Gen Accelerator Program entrant
- w/o = Walkover
- r = Retired
- d = Defaulted

=== First qualifier ===
First round
1	(France) Gilles Moretton	7	7
(United Kingdom) Trevor Heath	6	5
(Australia) Robert Keighery	6
(Nigeria) Segun Balogun	1^{r}
(Australia) Greg Whitecross	6	6
(Uganda) Patrick Tibbs	2	0
(Australia) Michael Fancutt	4	1
27	(Spain) Gabriel Urpí	6	6

Second round
1	(France) Gilles Moretton	6	6
(Australia) Robert Keighery	2	3
(Australia) Greg Whitecross	5	6	6
27	(Spain) Gabriel Urpí	7	2	1

Qualifying competition
1	(France) Gilles Moretton	6	7	6
(Australia) Greg Whitecross	4	6	2

=== Second qualifier ===
First round
2	(Australia) Brad Drewett	6	7
(United States) David Couch	2	6
(Australia) Chris Johnstone	6	5	6
(United States) Jeff Crowne	2	7	4
(United Kingdom) Neil Rayner	6	6
(Chile) José Ayala	4	4
(United Kingdom) Adrian Simcox	6	2
19	(United States) Peter Pearson	7	6

Second round
2	(Australia) Brad Drewett	6	5	6
(Australia) Chris Johnstone	1	7	4
(United Kingdom) Neil Rayner	4	6	5
19	(United States) Peter Pearson	6	1	7

Qualifying competition
2	(Australia) Brad Drewett	6	6	6
19	(United States) Peter Pearson	3	4	4

=== Third qualifier ===
First round
3	(United States) Richard Meyer	6	6
(United States) John Geraghty	4	1
(Australia) Peter Doohan	7	2	6
(United Kingdom) Stephen Alger	5	6	4
(Australia) Pat Serret	6	6
(South Africa) Frank Punčec	1	2
(United States) Jay Lapidus	7	3	6
26	(Japan) Shigeyuki Nishio	5	6	4

Second round
3	(United States) Richard Meyer	6	7
(Australia) Peter Doohan	4	6
(Australia) Pat Serret	6	6	14
(United States) Jay Lapidus	7	4	12

Qualifying competition
3	(United States) Richard Meyer	6	3	7	6
(Australia) Pat Serret	4	6	5	3

=== Fourth qualifier ===
First round
4	(Australia) Bob Giltinan	6	6
(United States) D Erickson	1	2
(United States) Andy Lucchesi	7	7
(United States) Brian McCarthy	6	5
(United Kingdom) Jeremy Dier	7	6
(Australia) Jeff Hamilton	6	3
(Jamaica) N Da Costa	2	6	3
17	(United States) Brad Rowe	6	3	6

Second round
4	(Australia) Bob Giltinan	6	7
(United States) Andy Lucchesi	3	6
(United Kingdom) Jeremy Dier	6	6
17	(United States) Brad Rowe	2	4

Qualifying competition
4	(Australia) Bob Giltinan	6	6	6
(United Kingdom) Jeremy Dier	2	3	4

=== Fifth qualifier ===
First round
5	(South Africa) John Yuill	7	7
(United Kingdom) Chris Bradnam	5	5
(Nigeria) David Imonitie	6	6	7
(United States) Robbie Smith	3	7	5
(Australia) Ray Ruffels	6	6	7
(Jamaica) L Mullings	4	7	5
(United Kingdom) Rohun Beven	6	7
23	(Netherlands) Paul van Min	3	6

Second round
5	(South Africa) John Yuill	6	7
(Nigeria) David Imonitie	3	6
(Australia) Ray Ruffels	6	6	6
(United Kingdom) Rohun Beven	4	7	8

Qualifying competition
5	(South Africa) John Yuill	5	4	3
(United Kingdom) Rohun Beven	7	6	6

=== Sixth qualifier ===
First round
6	(Australia) Noel Phillips	7	7
(Japan) Takao Yamamoto	5	6
(United States) Glen Holroyd	6	6
(South Africa) Francois van der Merwe	1	4
(United States) Fritz Buehning	3	6	6
(United States) Doug Ditmer	6	3	3
(United Kingdom) Michael Appleton	6	6	7
31	(Australia) Syd Ball	3	7	9

Second round
6	(Australia) Noel Phillips	7	7
(United States) Glen Holroyd	6	5
(United States) Fritz Buehning	6	7	10
31	(Australia) Syd Ball	7	6	8

Qualifying competition
6	(Australia) Noel Phillips	3	3	7	3
(United States) Fritz Buehning	6	6	6	6

=== Seventh qualifier ===
First round
7	(United States) Rick Fisher	7	6
(United Kingdom) Paul Blincow	6	2
(New Zealand) Paul Smith	5	7	6
(South Africa) Freddie Sauer	7	6	4
(United States) David Sherbeck	6	6
(United States) David Eddy	2	3
(Australia) Peter Wise	4	4
28	(Brazil) Thomaz Koch	6	6

Second round
7	(United States) Rick Fisher	6	6
(New Zealand) Paul Smith	0	3
(United States) David Sherbeck	4	3
28	(Brazil) Thomaz Koch	6	6

Qualifying competition
7	(United States) Rick Fisher	6	6	5	6	6
28	(Brazil) Thomaz Koch	7	4	7	4	4

=== Eighth qualifier ===
First round
8	(New Zealand) Onny Parun	7	6
(United Kingdom) Willie Davies	5	4
(Japan) Shinichi Sakamoto	6	6
(West Germany) Peter Holl	1	3
(Australia) Terry Saunders	7	5	12
(Australia) Brad Guan	6	7	10
(Ecuador) Raúl Viver	4	4
21	(United States) Tony Graham	6	6

Second round
8	(New Zealand) Onny Parun	6	6
(Japan) Shinichi Sakamoto	3	4
(Australia) Terry Saunders	0	2
21	(United States) Tony Graham	6	6

Qualifying competition
8	(New Zealand) Onny Parun	6	6	3	4	11
21	(United States) Tony Graham	4	4	6	6	9

=== Ninth qualifier ===
First round
9	(Peru) Fernando Maynetto	6	2	6
(Australia) Wayne Hampson	2	6	4
(Australia) John Fitzgerald	3	6	6
(Australia) Tim Clements	6	2	2
(United Kingdom) Mark Farrell	6	6
(Pakistan) Saeed Meer	4	2
(New Zealand) Steve Harley	7	1	2
32	(Australia) Greg Braun	5	6	6

Second round
9	(Peru) Fernando Maynetto	3	2
(Australia) John Fitzgerald	6	6
(United Kingdom) Mark Farrell	7	6
32	(Australia) Greg Braun	5	3

Qualifying competition
(Australia) John Fitzgerald	3	6	3	6	6
(United Kingdom) Mark Farrell	6	3	6	4	3

=== Tenth qualifier ===
First round
10	(Chile) Álvaro Fillol	6	6
(New Zealand) Peter Hampton	3	4
(New Zealand) Brett Hibbert	6	6
(Netherlands) Peter Geraerts	4	4
(South Africa) Charles Honey	6	3	6
(Japan) Nobuya Tamura	3	6	4
(United Kingdom) Michael Dawe	2	4
29	(Colombia) Alejandro Cortes	6	6

Second round
10	(Chile) Álvaro Fillol	7	6
(New Zealand) Brett Hibbert	5	2
(South Africa) Charles Honey	6	6	2
29	(Colombia) Alejandro Cortes	3	7	6

Qualifying competition
10	(Chile) Álvaro Fillol	7	6	5	3	0^{r}
29	(Colombia) Alejandro Cortes	6	4	7	6	3

=== Eleventh qualifier ===
First round
11	(United States) Bill Maze	4	4
(Republic of Ireland) Matt Doyle	6	6
(India) Nandan Bal	6	6
(Japan) Akinori Naguro	4	2
(Australia) David Whyte	6	6
(United States) Carlos Aguilar	4	2
(United States) Sam Vuille	6	4	13
22	(United States) Jon Molin	3	6	15

Second round
(Republic of Ireland) Matt Doyle	3	4
(India) Nandan Bal	6	6
(Australia) David Whyte	6	4	6
22	(United States) Jon Molin	2	6	3

Qualifying competition
(India) Nandan Bal	4	4	6
(Australia) David Whyte	6	6	7

=== Twelfth qualifier ===
First round
12	(Sweden) Jan Norbäck	6	7
(Pakistan) Nasir Munir-Ahmed	3	5
(Japan) Kiyoshi Tanabe	6	6
(New Zealand) Simon Norman	2	4
(United States) A Marshall	4	6	23
(United States) Robert Stock	6	3	21
(United Kingdom) Kevin Harris	6	6
25	(Australia) Victor Eke	4	4

Second round
12	(Sweden) Jan Norbäck	6	6	6
(Japan) Kiyoshi Tanabe	7	1	3
(United States) A Marshall	7	4	8
(United Kingdom) Kevin Harris	6	6	10

Qualifying competition
12	(Sweden) Jan Norbäck	6	6	6
(United Kingdom) Kevin Harris	2	4	4

=== Thirteenth qualifier ===
First round
13	(Australia) Charlie Fancutt	6	6
(United States) Don Paulsen	4	4
(Australia) Wayne Pascoe	7	7
(United Kingdom) Harvey Becker	6	5
(United States) Stewart Keller	7	6
(United Kingdom) Christopher Wells	5	1
(United Kingdom) John Whiteford	5	1
30	(United States) Charlie Pasarell	7	6

Second round
13	(Australia) Charlie Fancutt	2	6	6
(Australia) Wayne Pascoe	6	2	8
(United States) Stewart Keller	1	6
30	(United States) Charlie Pasarell	6	7

Qualifying competition
(Australia) Wayne Pascoe	2	4	3
30	(United States) Charlie Pasarell	6	6	6

=== Fourteenth qualifier ===
First round
14	(Sweden) Ulf Eriksson	3	6	6
(United Kingdom) Paul Bourdon	6	1	2
(United States) S Hunt	7	6
(Australia) P. Joyce	5	3
(United Kingdom) Tony Lloyd	6	2	7
(Australia) Craig A. Miller	4	6	5
(United States) Mark Elliott	3	3
20	(United Kingdom) John Paish	6	6

Second round
14	(Sweden) Ulf Eriksson	6	7
(United States) S Hunt	4	5
(United Kingdom) Tony Lloyd	6	3	6
20	(United Kingdom) John Paish	4	6	1

Qualifying competition
14	(Sweden) Ulf Eriksson	7	6	7
(United Kingdom) Tony Lloyd	5	2	5

=== Fifteenth qualifier ===
First round
15	(Australia) Cliff Letcher	6	6
(United Kingdom) Robert Booth	4	3
(India) Harishanker Krishnan	5	6	9
(United Kingdom) Mark Holland	7	4	7
(Japan) Kenichi Hirai	6	7
(Australia) Ray Kelly	3	6
(United Kingdom) Nigel Sears	1	6	2
18	(Canada) Richard Legendre	6	3	6

Second round
15	(Australia) Cliff Letcher	6	6
(India) Harishanker Krishnan	1	0
(Japan) Kenichi Hirai	6	6	6
18	(Canada) Richard Legendre	7	3	1

Qualifying competition
15	(Australia) Cliff Letcher	6	6	2	6
(Japan) Kenichi Hirai	4	4	6	4

=== Sixteenth qualifier ===
First round
16	(Brazil) Cássio Motta	6	6
(Australia) Noel Callaghan	2	3
(United States) Mark Andrews	6	1	6
(Australia) John Trickey	2	6	3
(Nigeria) Bulus Hussaini	4	7	6
(United States) Jim Harper	6	6	2
(Australia) Stephen Myers	5	5
24	(Japan) Tsuyoshi Fukui	7	7

Second round
16	(Brazil) Cássio Motta	6	6
(United States) Mark Andrews	1	2
(Nigeria) Bulus Hussaini	4	6	4
24	(Japan) Tsuyoshi Fukui	6	4	6

Qualifying competition
16	(Brazil) Cássio Motta	6	4
24	(Japan) Tsuyoshi Fukui	2	2^{r}
