= 1981 Wimbledon Championships – Men's singles qualifying =

Men's singles qualifying
- 1981 Wimbledon Championships

Events
Singles	men	women		boys	girls
Doubles	men	women	mixed	boys	girls
WC Singles	men	women	quad
WC Doubles	men	women	quad
Legends	men	women	seniors

Qualification
Singles	men	women
Doubles	men	women	mixed
- Wimbledon Championships

Players who neither had high enough rankings nor received wild cards to enter the main draw of the annual Wimbledon Tennis Championships participated in a qualifying tournament held one week before the event. Several players withdrew from the main draw after qualifying had commenced, leading to the highest ranked players who lost in the final qualifying round to be entered into the main draw as lucky losers.

== Seeds ==
1. (Australia) Charlie Fancutt (qualified)
2. (Australia) Wayne Hampson (second round)
3. (Australia) Chris Johnstone (qualifying competition, lucky loser)
4. (France) Gilles Moretton (qualified)
5. (Colombia) Alejandro Cortes (first round)
6. (Australia) Brad Guan (first round)
7. (United States) Craig Wittus (qualified)
8. (Sweden) Jan Gunnarsson (first round)
9. (United States) Erik van Dillen (qualified)
10. (United States) Marty Davis (qualified)
11. (Chile) Álvaro Fillol (qualifying competition, lucky loser)
12. (India) Anand Amritraj (first round)
13. (Sweden) Joakim Nyström (qualifying competition, lucky loser)
14. (India) Sashi Menon (qualified)
15. (United States) Tony Graham (second round)
16. (Spain) Roberto Vizcaino-Mallol (second round)
17. (West Germany) Ulrich Marten (qualifying competition, lucky loser)
18. (United States) Chris Mayotte (first round)
19. (United States) Scott McCain (qualified)
20. (United States) Mike Estep (qualifying competition, lucky loser)
21. (Finland) Leo Palin (first round)
22. (Brazil) Cássio Motta (second round)
23. (Sweden) Mats Wilander (qualified)
24. (Australia) Dale Collings (qualified)
25. (United States) Steve Meister (second round)
26. -
27. (France) Henri Leconte (qualifying competition, lucky loser)
28. (Australia) Wayne Pascoe (qualified)
29. (Australia) Cliff Letcher (qualified)
30. (United States) Scott Davis (qualifying competition, lucky loser)
31. (South Africa) Rory Chappell (first round)
32. (United States) Steve Denton (qualifying competition, lucky loser)

== Qualifiers ==
1. (Australia) Charlie Fancutt
2. (Australia) Dale Collings
3. (Australia) Wayne Pascoe
4. (France) Gilles Moretton
5. (Australia) Craig A. Miller
6. (United States) Glen Holroyd
7. (United States) Craig Wittus
8. (United States) Scott McCain
9. (United States) Erik van Dillen
10. (United States) Marty Davis
11. (Sweden) Mats Wilander
12. (United States) Joel Bailey
13. (United States) Chris Dunk
14. (India) Sashi Menon
15. (Australia) Cliff Letcher
16. (Sweden) Jörgen Windahl

== Lucky losers ==
1. (West Germany) Ulrich Marten
2. (United States) Scott Davis
3. (Chile) Álvaro Fillol
4. (France) Henri Leconte
5. (United States) Mike Estep
6. (Sweden) Joakim Nyström
7. (United States) Steve Denton
8. (Australia) Chris Johnstone

== Qualifying draw ==
Key

- Q = Qualifier
- WC = Wild card
- LL = Lucky loser
- Alt = Alternate
- ITF = ITF entry
- PR = Protected ranking
- SR = Special ranking
- SE = Special exempt
- JE = Junior exempt
- JR = Junior Accelerator Programme entrant
- CO = College Accelerator Programme entrant
- NG = Next Gen Accelerator Program entrant
- w/o = Walkover
- r = Retired
- d = Defaulted

=== First qualifier ===
First round
1	(Australia) Charlie Fancutt	6	6
(Australia) Carl Limberger	1	2
(United Kingdom) Jeremy Bates	6	6
(Japan) Shigeyuki Nishio	3	1
(Australia) Warren Maher	6	6
(Australia) Brian Benson	1	2
(Sweden) Jan-Eric Palm	6	6	7
17	(West Germany) Ulrich Marten	7	4	9

Second round
1	(Australia) Charlie Fancutt	6	6
(United Kingdom) Jeremy Bates	3	2
(Australia) Warren Maher	7	5	2
17	(West Germany) Ulrich Marten	6	7	6

Qualifying competition
1	(Australia) Charlie Fancutt	4	6	6	7
17	(West Germany) Ulrich Marten	6	3	0	5

=== Second qualifier ===
First round
2	(Australia) Wayne Hampson	6	6
(Australia) Ray Kelly	4	3
(United States) Jeff Edwards	1	3
(Australia) Pat Serret	6	6
(South Africa) Schalk van der Merwe	6	4	6
(Australia) Brett Edwards	3	6	4
(United Kingdom) Peter Farrell	2	6	3
24	(Australia) Dale Collings	6	4	6

Second round
2	(Australia) Wayne Hampson	6	4	2
(Australia) Pat Serret	2	6	6
(South Africa) Schalk van der Merwe	1	6	1
24	(Australia) Dale Collings	6	3	6

Qualifying competition
(Australia) Pat Serret	1	4	3
24	(Australia) Dale Collings	6	6	6

=== Third qualifier ===
First round
3	(Australia) Chris Johnstone	6	6
(United States) Curt Stalder	2	2
(Spain) Juan Avendaño	3	7	2
(Republic of Ireland) Sean Sorensen	6	6	6
(United Kingdom) Timothy Robson	7	6
(Australia) Ken Barton	6	3
(United Kingdom) Clive Kightley	5	2
28	(Australia) Wayne Pascoe	7	6

Second round
3	(Australia) Chris Johnstone	6	6
(Republic of Ireland) Sean Sorensen	1	4
(United Kingdom) Timothy Robson	7	5	3
28	(Australia) Wayne Pascoe	6	7	6

Qualifying competition
3	(Australia) Chris Johnstone	4	6	6	6
28	(Australia) Wayne Pascoe	6	7	4	7

=== Fourth qualifier ===
First round
4	(France) Gilles Moretton	6	6
(United States) Scott Kidd	3	4
(United Kingdom) Bruce Young	3	5
(United Kingdom) Stephen Alger	6	7
(South Africa) Frank Punčec	6	6
(Japan) Tsuyoshi Fukui	3	3
(India) Nandan Bal	2	3
20	(United States) Mike Estep	6	6

Second round
4	(France) Gilles Moretton	6	6
(United Kingdom) Stephen Alger	4	4
(South Africa) Frank Punčec	3	7	4
20	(United States) Mike Estep	6	5	6

Qualifying competition
4	(France) Gilles Moretton	6	3	6	6
20	(United States) Mike Estep	3	6	1	4

=== Fifth qualifier ===
First round
5	(Colombia) Alejandro Cortes	6	2
(Australia) Wally Masur	7	6
(Australia) Craig A. Miller	6	6
(United States) Kevin Cook	3	4
(United States) Ian Harris	6	6
(United Kingdom) Robert Booth	2	3
(South Africa) Freddie Sauer	6	6
31	(South Africa) Rory Chappell	4	4

Second round
(Australia) Wally Masur	7	0	9
(Australia) Craig A. Miller	6	6	11
(United States) Ian Harris	2	6	1
(South Africa) Freddie Sauer	6	3	6

Qualifying competition
(Australia) Craig A. Miller	6	6	6
(South Africa) Freddie Sauer	2	3	2

=== Sixth qualifier ===
First round
6	(Australia) Brad Guan	3	6	4
(Japan) Shinichi Sakamoto	6	2	6
(Philippines) Beeyong Sison	3	5^{r}
(United States) Glen Holroyd	6	5
(South Africa) Brent Pirow	4	2
(United States) Mike Gandolfo	6	3^{r}
(United States) Tracy Delatte	6	6
21	(Finland) Leo Palin	1	4

Second round
(Japan) Shinichi Sakamoto	7	6	4
(United States) Glen Holroyd	6	7	6
(South Africa) Brent Pirow	6	5	3
(United States) Tracy Delatte	1	7	6

Qualifying competition
(United States) Glen Holroyd	7	6	6
(United States) Tracy Delatte	5	1	4

=== Seventh qualifier ===
First round
7	(United States) Craig Wittus	6	7
(United Kingdom) Martin Guntrip	1	5
(United States) Randy Lane	4	1
(United Kingdom) Willie Davies	6	6
(United Kingdom) Jeremy Dier	6	7
(United States) Rick Flach	3	6
(Netherlands) Eric Wilborts	3	4
22	(Brazil) Cássio Motta	6	6

Second round
7	(United States) Craig Wittus	6	3	6
(United Kingdom) Willie Davies	4	6	4
(United Kingdom) Jeremy Dier	6	6
22	(Brazil) Cássio Motta	2	4

Qualifying competition
7	(United States) Craig Wittus	6	7	7
(United Kingdom) Jeremy Dier	4	5	5

=== Eighth qualifier ===
First round
8	(Sweden) Jan Gunnarsson	1	6
(Australia) Greg Whitecross	6	7
(South Africa) Danie Visser	6	3	11
(Japan) Nobuya Tamura	3	6	9
(Canada) Steve Rogul	3	0
(Romania) Florin Segărceanu	6	6
(Mexico) Ricardo Sánchez	4	1
19	(United States) Scott McCain	6	6

Second round
(Australia) Greg Whitecross	5	6	7
(South Africa) Danie Visser	7	2	5
(Romania) Florin Segărceanu	0	4
19	(United States) Scott McCain	6	6

Qualifying competition
(Australia) Greg Whitecross	7	6	4	2
19	(United States) Scott McCain	6	7	6	6

=== Ninth qualifier ===
First round
9	(United States) Erik van Dillen	6	6
(United States) Tim Garcia	1	2
(United States) Walter Redondo	2	6	6
(United States) Fred McNair	6	2	2
(United States) Clifford Skakle	0	6	19
(Australia) Peter Doohan	6	1	17
(United States) Craig Edwards	7	6
Alt	(United States) Matt Anger	5	4

Second round
9	(United States) Erik van Dillen	6	6
(United States) Walter Redondo	3	4
(United States) Clifford Skakle	3	3
(United States) Craig Edwards	6	6

Qualifying competition
9	(United States) Erik van Dillen	5	6	7	3	6
(United States) Craig Edwards	7	4	5	6	3

=== Tenth qualifier ===
First round
10	(United States) Marty Davis	6	6
(France) Hervé Gauvain	3	4
(Japan) Jun Kamiwazumi	7	6
(Netherlands) Huub van Boeckel	5	4
(South Africa) Craig Campbell	5	6	4
(Chile) Juan-Carlos Ayala	7	4	6
(South Africa) John Yuill	2	6	3
30	(United States) Scott Davis	6	3	6

Second round
10	(United States) Marty Davis	5	6	16
(Japan) Jun Kamiwazumi	7	2	14
(Chile) Juan-Carlos Ayala	1	3
30	(United States) Scott Davis	6	6

Qualifying competition
10	(United States) Marty Davis	6	6	6
30	(United States) Scott Davis	3	4	4

=== Eleventh qualifier ===
First round
11	(Chile) Álvaro Fillol	6	6	6
(United Kingdom) Rohun Beven	4	7	1
(United Kingdom) David Felgate	0	3
(United Kingdom) Michael Appleton	6	6
(Mexico) Juan Hernández	1	3
(France) Jérôme Vanier	6	6
(France) Christophe Lesage	1	4
23	(Sweden) Mats Wilander	6	6

Second round
11	(Chile) Álvaro Fillol	3	6	6
(United Kingdom) Michael Appleton	6	3	2
(France) Jérôme Vanier	1	2
23	(Sweden) Mats Wilander	6	6

Qualifying competition
11	(Chile) Álvaro Fillol	2	2	5
23	(Sweden) Mats Wilander	6	6	7

=== Twelfth qualifier ===
First round
12	(India) Anand Amritraj	6	4
(South Africa) Michael Robertson	7	6
(South Africa) Barry Moir	6	6
(United Kingdom) Steven Matthews	1	1
(Nigeria) Bulus Hussaini	2	6	7
(United States) Mark Darby	6	3	9
(United States) Joel Bailey	6	6
18	(United States) Chris Mayotte	4	2

Second round
(South Africa) Michael Robertson	4	6	10
(South Africa) Barry Moir	6	4	8
(United States) Mark Darby	4	4
(United States) Joel Bailey	6	6

Qualifying competition
(South Africa) Michael Robertson	4	1	3
(United States) Joel Bailey	6	6	6

=== Thirteenth qualifier ===
First round
13	(Sweden) Joakim Nyström	7	6
(West Germany) Hans-Dieter Beutel	6	2
(Nigeria) Steven Olagbegi	3	3
(South Africa) Mike Myburg	6	6
(United States) Chris Dunk	6	6
(Australia) Jeff Young	2	2
(Italy) Patrizio Parrini	1	6
25	(United States) Steve Meister	6	7

Second round
13	(Sweden) Joakim Nyström	4	6	6
(South Africa) Mike Myburg	6	0	2
(United States) Chris Dunk	4	6	14
25	(United States) Steve Meister	6	2	12

Qualifying competition
13	(Sweden) Joakim Nyström	6	4	5	6	0
(United States) Chris Dunk	4	6	7	3	6

=== Fourteenth qualifier ===
First round
14	(India) Sashi Menon	7	6
(United States) Carlos Aguilar	6	0
(South Africa) Michael Livshitz	3	6
(South Africa) Tian Viljoen	6	7
(Switzerland) Markus Günthardt	1	6	3
(United States) Bruce Nichols	6	3	6
(United Kingdom) Stephen Shaw	6	3	9
32	(United States) Steve Denton	4	6	11

Second round
14	(India) Sashi Menon	7	6	6
(South Africa) Tian Viljoen	6	7	2
(United States) Bruce Nichols	1	6
32	(United States) Steve Denton	6	7

Qualifying competition
14	(India) Sashi Menon	6	6	7	6
32	(United States) Steve Denton	7	2	5	2

=== Fifteenth qualifier ===
First round
15	(United States) Tony Graham	6	6
(South Africa) Henri de Wet	0	0
(United Kingdom) Jonathan Markson	4	4
(Australia) Hans Hansson	6	6
(South Africa) Kevin Moir	7	6
(India) Enrico Piperno	5	2
(United States) Charlie Pasarell	4	6
29	(Australia) Cliff Letcher	6	7

Second round
15	(United States) Tony Graham	4	6	4
(Australia) Hans Hansson	6	2	6
(South Africa) Kevin Moir	3	3
29	(Australia) Cliff Letcher	6	6

Qualifying competition
(Australia) Hans Hansson	3	6	3
29	(Australia) Cliff Letcher	6	7	6

=== Sixteenth qualifier ===
First round
16	(Spain) Roberto Vizcaino-Mallol	6	6
(Chile) José Antonio Fernández	3	3
(United States) Cary Leeds	6	1
(Sweden) Jörgen Windahl	7	6
(Romania) Andrei Dîrzu	7	6
(India) Srinivasan Vasudevan	6	4
(Japan) Kenichi Hirai	2	6
27	(France) Henri Leconte	6	7

Second round
16	(Spain) Roberto Vizcaino-Mallol	3	7	3
(Sweden) Jörgen Windahl	6	6	6
(Romania) Andrei Dîrzu	6	6	5
27	(France) Henri Leconte	7	4	7

Qualifying competition
(Sweden) Jörgen Windahl	6	7	6
27	(France) Henri Leconte	3	6	3
