= 1979 Wimbledon Championships – Women's singles qualifying =

Women's singles qualifying
- 1979 Wimbledon Championships

Events
Singles	men	women		boys	girls
Doubles	men	women	mixed	boys	girls
WC Singles	men	women	quad
WC Doubles	men	women	quad
Legends	men	women	seniors

Qualification
Singles	men	women
Doubles	men	women	mixed
- Wimbledon Championships

Players who neither had high enough rankings nor received wild cards to enter the main draw of the annual Wimbledon Tennis Championships participated in a qualifying tournament held one week before the event.

== Qualifiers ==
1. (Canada) Marjorie Blackwood
2. (South Africa) Tanya Harford
3. (United States) Andrea Whitmore
4. (United Kingdom) Lesley Charles
5. (Netherlands) Mariëtte Pakker
6. (Netherlands) Marcella Mesker
7. (United States) Diane Morrison
8. (Italy) Sabina Simmonds

== Qualifying draw ==
Key

- Q = Qualifier
- WC = Wild card
- LL = Lucky loser
- Alt = Alternate
- ITF = ITF entry
- PR = Protected ranking
- SR = Special ranking
- SE = Special exempt
- JE = Junior exempt
- JR = Junior Accelerator Programme entrant
- CO = College Accelerator Programme entrant
- NG = Next Gen Accelerator Program entrant
- w/o = Walkover
- r = Retired
- d = Defaulted

=== First qualifier ===
First round
1	(Canada) Marjorie Blackwood	7	4	6
8	(Australia) Nerida Gregory	6	6	3
4	(United States) Nancy Weigel	6	6
5	(New Zealand) Brenda Perry	2	2
2	(United States) Jane Preyer	7	6
7	(Japan) Naoko Sato	5	2
3	(United Kingdom) Veronica Burton	2	6	6
6	(United States) A. Schroeder	6	2	3

Second round
(Canada) Marjorie Blackwood	7	6
(United States) Nancy Weigel	5	4
(United States) Jane Preyer	2	6	6
(United Kingdom) Veronica Burton	6	2	3

Qualifying competition
(Canada) Marjorie Blackwood	6	4	6
(United States) Jane Preyer	3	6	1

=== Second qualifier ===
First round
1	(South Africa) Tanya Harford	6	6
8	(United Kingdom) Debbie Parker	0	3
4	(United States) Margaret Riley	6	4	6
5	(Romania) Lucia Romanov-Stark	4	6	4
2	(United States) Kim Sands	7	6
7	(Australia) Elizabeth Smylie	6	4
3	(New Zealand) Chris Newton	6	6	6
6	(United Kingdom) Annette Coe	7	2	2

Second round
(South Africa) Tanya Harford	6	6
(United States) Margaret Riley	1	2
(United States) Kim Sands	6	6
(New Zealand) Chris Newton	3	2

Qualifying competition
(South Africa) Tanya Harford	7	6
(United States) Kim Sands	5	3

=== Third qualifier ===
First round
1	(United States) Andrea Whitmore	6	6
8	(Australia) Jenny Walker	2	4
4	(Sweden) Helena Anliot	6	7
5	(United Kingdom) Clare Harrison	4	6
2	(Romania) Florenza Mihai	6	6
7	(New Zealand) Judy Connor	0	3
3	(South Africa) Jennifer Mundel	6	6
6	(Canada) Angela Walker	4	2

Second round
(United States) Andrea Whitmore	6	7
(Sweden) Helena Anliot	4	5
(Romania) Florenza Mihai	6	6
(South Africa) Jennifer Mundel	3	2

Qualifying competition
(United States) Andrea Whitmore	6	6
(Romania) Florenza Mihai	2	2

=== Fourth qualifier ===
First round
1	(United Kingdom) Lesley Charles	6	6
8	(United States) Leslie Allen	4	0
4	(Australia) Elizabeth Little	7	6
5	(United States) Jean Nachand	6	2
2	(Australia) Kym Ruddell	6	6
7	(Australia) Cathy Griffiths	3	3
3	(Czechoslovakia) Yvona Brzáková	6	6
6	(United States) Julie Harrington	2	4

Second round
(United Kingdom) Lesley Charles	7	6
(Australia) Elizabeth Little	5	2
(Australia) Kym Ruddell	6	7
(Czechoslovakia) Yvona Brzáková	4	6

Qualifying competition
(United Kingdom) Lesley Charles	4	6	9
(Australia) Kym Ruddell	6	2	7

=== Fifth qualifier ===
First round
1	(Netherlands) Mariëtte Pakker	6	6
8	(United Kingdom) Jane Plackett	3	4
4	(United Kingdom) Linda Geeves	5	7	6
5	(Australia) Kaye Hallam	7	5	3
2	(United States) Nancy Yeargin	6	2	6
7	(Australia) Wendy Gilchrist	1	6	3
3	(Switzerland) Isabelle Villiger	4	6	6
6	(United Kingdom) Elizabeth Locke	6	2	4

Second round
(Netherlands) Mariëtte Pakker	7	7
(United Kingdom) Linda Geeves	6	5
(United States) Nancy Yeargin	6	6
(Switzerland) Isabelle Villiger	0	3

Qualifying competition
(Netherlands) Mariëtte Pakker	6	6
(United States) Nancy Yeargin	4	2

=== Sixth qualifier ===
First round
1	(Netherlands) Marcella Mesker	6	6
8	(Belgium) Monique Gurdal	2	3
4	(Australia) Kerryn Pratt	6	6	6
5	(Canada) Lisa Senn	2	7	2
2	(Australia) Sue Saliba	7	6
7	(United Kingdom) Penny Moor	5	3
3	(United Kingdom) Kate Brasher	5	6	6
6	(United Kingdom) Shelley Walpole	7	3	4

Second round
(Netherlands) Marcella Mesker	6	6
(Australia) Kerryn Pratt	2	0
(Australia) Sue Saliba	6	6
(United Kingdom) Kate Brasher	0	2

Qualifying competition
(Netherlands) Marcella Mesker	6	6
(Australia) Sue Saliba	0	2

=== Seventh qualifier ===
First round
1	(United States) Diane Morrison	7	7
8	(United States) Jane Stratton	6	5
4	(United Kingdom) Cathy Drury	6	6
5	(Switzerland) Christianne Jolissaint	4	0
2	(Sweden) Elisabeth Ekblom	6	6
7	(France) Anne Chevalier	0	1
3	(Australia) Pam Whytcross	5	6	6
6	(Australia) Julie Harrison	7	1	4

Second round
(United States) Diane Morrison	6	6
(United Kingdom) Cathy Drury	2	2
(Sweden) Elisabeth Ekblom	6	6
(Australia) Pam Whytcross	4	4

Qualifying competition
(United States) Diane Morrison	7	6
(Sweden) Elisabeth Ekblom	6	3

=== Eighth qualifier ===
First round
1	(Italy) Sabina Simmonds	7	6
8	(United States) Patricia Bostrom	6	2
4	(Denmark) Birgitte Hermansen	7	6
5	(United Kingdom) Corinne Molesworth	6	1
2	(Argentina) Raquel Giscafré	6	6
7	(United Kingdom) Victoria Davies	1	1
3	(Argentina) Claudia Casabianca	6	6
6	(Sweden) Ingrid Lofdahl-Bentzer	3	2

Second round
(Italy) Sabina Simmonds	6	6
(Denmark) Birgitte Hermansen	1	4
(Argentina) Raquel Giscafré	6	3	6
(Argentina) Claudia Casabianca	4	6	3

Qualifying competition
(Italy) Sabina Simmonds	6	7
(Argentina) Raquel Giscafré	2	5
