= 1977 Australian Open (December) – Men's singles qualifying =

Men's singles qualifying
- 1977 Australian Open (December)

Events
Singles	men	women
Doubles	men	women

Qualification
Singles	men	women
- Australian Open (December)

This article displays the qualifying draw for men's singles at the 1977 Australian Open (December).

== Qualifiers ==
1. (Australia) Bob Giltinan
2. (Australia) Rod Frawley
3. (Australia) Noel Phillips
4. (Australia) Dale Collings
5. (Australia) Peter Campbell
6. (Australia) Brad Drewett
7. (Australia) Mal Anderson
8. (Austria) Peter Feigl

== Lucky losers ==
1. (France) Gilles Moretton
2. (United States) Chris Sylvan

== Qualifying draw ==
Key

- Q = Qualifier
- WC = Wild card
- LL = Lucky loser
- Alt = Alternate
- ITF = ITF entry
- PR = Protected ranking
- SR = Special ranking
- SE = Special exempt
- JE = Junior exempt
- JR = Junior Accelerator Programme entrant
- CO = College Accelerator Programme entrant
- NG = Next Gen Accelerator Program entrant
- w/o = Walkover
- r = Retired
- d = Defaulted

=== First qualifier ===
First round
(United States) Chris Sylvan	6	6
(Australia) Peter Barton	1	4
(Australia) Bob Giltinan	6	6	6
(United States) John Holladay	4	7	0

Second round
(Australia) Pat Serret	2	6
(United States) Chris Sylvan	6	7
(Australia) Bob Giltinan	6	6
(Australia) G. Condon	0	2

Qualifying competition
(United States) Chris Sylvan	3	2
(Australia) Bob Giltinan	6	6

=== Second qualifier ===
First round
(Australia) Rod Frawley	6	6
(Australia) David Chapman	2	1
(Australia) W. Van Diense	6	4	6
(Australia) Richard Eden	3	6	3

Second round
(Australia) Paul Dougherty	6	3
(Australia) Rod Frawley	7	6
(Australia) W. Van Diense	0	2
(France) Jacques Thamin	6	6

Qualifying competition
(Australia) Rod Frawley	6	6
(France) Jacques Thamin	2	3

=== Third qualifier ===
First round
(Australia) Noel Phillips	6	7
(Australia) Ray Kelly	3	6
(Australia) David Carter	6	6
(Australia) Alan Rae	3	2

Second round
(Australia) Charlie Fancutt	3	6
(Australia) Noel Phillips	6	7
(Australia) David Carter	6	6
(Australia) Glenn Ayre	1	1

Qualifying competition
(Australia) Noel Phillips	6	6	6
(Australia) David Carter	1	7	1

=== Fourth qualifier ===
First round
(Australia) Robert Keighery	7	6
(Australia) Bill Gilmour	6	2
(Australia) David Whyte	6	6
(Australia) Keith Begley	4	4

Second round
(Australia) Dale Collings	6	6
(Australia) Robert Keighery	3	4
(Australia) David Whyte	6	6	6
(Australia) R. King	7	4	3

Qualifying competition
(Australia) Dale Collings	6	6
(Australia) David Whyte	4	2

=== Fifth qualifier ===
First round
(Australia) Greg Whitecross	1	5
(Australia) Trevor Little	6	7
(Australia) Chris Tregonning	1	3
(Australia) Peter Campbell	6	6

Second round
(France) Gilles Moretton	7	6
(Australia) Trevor Little	6	2
(Australia) Peter Campbell	6	6
(Australia) Noel Jensen	1	0

Qualifying competition
(France) Gilles Moretton	6	3
(Australia) Peter Campbell	7	6

=== Sixth qualifier ===
First round
(Australia) Tim Clements	2	3
(Australia) Brad Drewett	6	6
(Australia) Mark Dragan	2	1
(United States) Stephen Mott	6	6

Second round
(Australia) Lawrence Hall	7	6	6
(Australia) Brad Drewett	6	7	8
(United States) Stephen Mott	6	6
(Australia) Jeff Hamilton	2	4

Qualifying competition
(Australia) Brad Drewett	6	6
(United States) Stephen Mott	3	4

=== Seventh qualifier ===
First round
(Australia) Glenn Busby	4	6
(Australia) Graeme Thomson	6	7
(Australia) Mark Pinchbeck	1	4
(Australia) John Trickey	6	6

Second round
(Australia) Mal Anderson	6	6
(Australia) Graeme Thomson	1	4
(Australia) John Trickey	6	6
(Australia) M. Huffmann	3	1

Qualifying competition
(Australia) Mal Anderson	3	6	6
(Australia) John Trickey	6	4	0

=== Eighth qualifier ===
First round
(Australia) Michael Fancutt	3	2
(Austria) Peter Feigl	6	6
(Australia) Simon Clarke	3	6
(Australia) Victor Eke	6	7

Second round
(Australia) T. Embree	4	2
(Austria) Peter Feigl	6	6
(Australia) Victor Eke	4	6
(Australia) Greg Braun	6	7

Qualifying competition
(Austria) Peter Feigl	6	3	6
(Australia) Greg Braun	1	6	2
