= Pat Serret =

Australian tennis player (born 1960)

- Full name: Patrick Serret
- Country (sports): Australia
- Born: 2 August 1960 (age 64); Nice, France
- Plays: Right-handed

Singles
- Career record: 1–2
- Highest ranking: No. 327 (23 Mar 1987)

Grand Slam singles results
- Australian Open: Q2 (1977 (Dec), 1979)
- Wimbledon: Q3 (1979, 1981)

Doubles
- Career record: 3–4
- Highest ranking: No. 256 (2 Feb 1987)

Grand Slam doubles results
- Wimbledon: Q3 (1979)
- US Open: 1R (1982)

Patrick Serret (born 2 August 1960) is an Australian former professional tennis player.

Born in Nice, France, Serret moved to Australia at a young age and was a student at Canterbury Boys' High School.

Serret was the boys' singles champion at the 1978 Australian Open, beating Chris Johnstone in the final.

From 1981 to 1984, Serret played collegiate tennis for the University of Arkansas, earning All-American honours in each of his four seasons. Partnering Australian teammate Peter Doohan, Serret won the 1982 NCAA Division I doubles championship. The pair also competed together in the men's doubles main draw of the 1982 US Open.

Serret is married with two daughters and lives in the U.S. state of Louisiana.
