= Shinichi Sakamoto =

Japanese tennis player (born 1954)

- Native name: 坂本真一
- Country (sports): Japan
- Born: 16 April 1954 (age 71)
- Plays: Right-handed

Singles
- Career record: 1–7
- Highest ranking: No. 274 (20 December 1974)

Grand Slam singles results
- Australian Open: Q1 (1981)
- Wimbledon: Q2 (1979, 1981, 1984)

Doubles
- Career record: 5–14
- Highest ranking: No. 307 (18 April 1988)

Grand Slam doubles results
- French Open: 1R (1980)
- Wimbledon: 1R (1979)

Shinichi Sakamoto (born 16 April 1954) is a Japanese former professional tennis player.

Sakamoto competed in the doubles main draw of the 1979 Wimbledon Championships and 1980 French Open, both times with Shigeyuki Nishio as his partner.

During the early 1980s, Sakamoto played in six Davis Cup ties for Japan. This included a 1981 tie against France, in which he lost a match to Thierry Tulasne by a scoreline of 0–6, 0–6, 0–6. In 1985 he played in a World Group fixture against the United States.

== See also ==
- List of Japan Davis Cup team representatives
