= Punčec =

Punčec is a surname. Notable people with the surname include:

- Franjo Punčec (1913–1985), Yugoslav tennis player
- Frank Punčec (born 1951), South African tennis player, son of Franjo
- Roberto Punčec (born 1991), Croatian footballer
