= Harvey Becker =

British tennis player (born 1960)

- Country (sports): United Kingdom
- Born: 21 May 1960 (age 66) London, England
- Plays: Right-handed (one-handed backhand)

Singles
- Career titles: 0
- Highest ranking: No. 470 (4 January 1981)

Grand Slam singles results
- Wimbledon: Q1 (1978, 1979, 1980)

Doubles
- Career titles: 0
- Highest ranking: No. 696 (4 January 1981)

Grand Slam doubles results
- Wimbledon: Q1 (1979, 1983)

Harvey Becker (born 21 May 1960) is a British former professional tennis player.

He reached his career-high singles ranking of World No. 470 in January 1981, and his career-high doubles ranking of World No. 696 in January 1981. He is currently the Head Tennis Professional of High Performance Tennis Academy at Radnor Valley Country Club.

== Tennis career ==
Becker was a successful junior player, who was the UK Junior National Champion. Becker played in the Wimbledon Junior Boys Championships in 1977. He lost in the first round, in three sets, to Ramesh Krishnan, who went on to become the world No. 1 junior.

Becker played collegiate tennis at Nicholls State University. In 1978, he lost only two matches the entire year and led the then-Division II school to third place in the NCAA Men's Division II Tennis Championship.

From 1980 to 1985, Becker played on the men's tour. He reached a career high in singles of No. 470 and was the No. 13 British male tennis player.

Becker played in The Championships, Wimbledon a total of five times. He lost in the first round of singles qualifying at Wimbledon in 1978, 1979 and 1980. Additionally, he lost in the first round of doubles qualifying in 1979 and 1983.

His only appearance in an ATP main draw was at the 1980 British Hard Court Championships. He was defeated by world No. 76 Shlomo Glickstein in straight sets.

== Coaching career ==
Following his retirement from professional tennis, in 1985, Becker entered the world of tennis coaching. He coached multiple British national teams and served as the director of a British tennis academy. While coaching, Becker worked with a number of Britain's upcoming young talent including Luke Milligan. Becker now coaches in the United States as the Head Tennis Professional of High Performance Tennis Academy at Radnor Valley Country Club.

== Grand Slam tournament performance timeline ==
Key
W	F	SF	QF	#R	RR	Q#	P#	DNQ	A	Z#	PO	G	S	B	NMS	NTI	P	NH

(W) winner; (F) finalist; (SF) semifinalist; (QF) quarterfinalist; (#R) rounds 4, 3, 2, 1; (RR) round-robin stage; (Q#) qualification round; (P#) preliminary round; (DNQ) did not qualify; (A) absent; (Z#) Davis/Fed Cup Zonal Group (with number indication) or (PO) play-off; (G) gold, (S) silver or (B) bronze Olympic/Paralympic medal; (NMS) not a Masters tournament; (NTI) not a Tier I tournament; (P) postponed; (NH) not held; (SR) strike rate (events won / competed); (W–L) win–loss record.
To avoid confusion and double counting, these charts are updated at the conclusion of a tournament or when the player's participation has ended.

=== Singles ===
Tournament	1978	1979	1980	SR	W–L	Win %
Australian Open	A	A	A	0 / 0	0–0	–
French Open	A	A	A	0 / 0	0–0	–
Wimbledon	Q1	Q1	Q1	0 / 3	0–3	0%
US Open	A	A	A	0 / 0	0–0	–
Win–loss	0–1	0–1	0–1	0 / 3	0–3	0%

=== Doubles ===
Tournament	1979	1983	SR	W–L	Win %
Australian Open	A	A	0 / 0	0–0	–
French Open	A	A	0 / 0	0–0	–
Wimbledon	Q1	Q1	0 / 2	0–2	0%
US Open	A	A	0 / 0	0–0	–
Win–loss	0–1	0–1	0 / 2	0–2	0%
