= David Imonitie =

Nigerian tennis player

- Country (sports): Nigeria
- Born: 10 April 1954 (age 72) Lagos, Nigeria

Singles
- Career record: 2–3
- Highest ranking: No. 347 (26 Dec 1979)

Grand Slam singles results
- Wimbledon: Q2 (1979)

Doubles
- Career record: 0–3
- Highest ranking: No. 450 (18 Mar 1985)

Grand Slam doubles results
- Wimbledon: Q1 (1978)

David Imonitie (born 10 April 1954) is a Nigerian former professional tennis player.

Born in Lagos, Imonitie was employed by Nigeria's national sports commission and was sponsored on tour by the government. His best performance came at the 1979 Lagos Open, where he had wins over Greg Halder and Peter Elter to make the singles quarter-finals. He reached the second qualifying round of the 1979 Wimbledon Championships.

Imonitie played collegiate tennis for the Northwest Missouri State Bearcats. He was a two-time All-American and won four MIAA conference singles titles. After graduating he completed a master's degree at Arizona State University.

In 1986 he played in the Davis Cup for two ties.
