= Jeremy Dier =

British tennis player (born 1960)

- Country (sports): Great Britain
- Born: 30 May 1960 (age 65); Brighton, England
- Plays: Right-handed

Singles
- Highest ranking: No. 344 (4 Jan 1982)

Grand Slam singles results
- Wimbledon: Q3 (1979, 1981, 1983)

Doubles
- Career record: 3–18
- Highest ranking: No. 220 (25 Jun 1984)

Grand Slam doubles results
- Wimbledon: 2R (1982, 1983)

Grand Slam mixed doubles results
- Wimbledon: 2R (1980, 1981, 1983)

Jeremy Dier (born 30 May 1960) is a British former professional tennis player. He is the father of footballer Eric Dier.

Born in Brighton, Dier competed on the professional tour from the late 1970s to early 1980s, reaching a best singles world ranking of 344. Most active in doubles, he featured in the Wimbledon main draw seven times in men's doubles and four times in mixed doubles. He and Jeremy Bates partnered together to beat the 16th-seeded pairing of Jan Gunnarsson and Mike Leach in the first round of the 1983 Wimbledon Championships.

== ATP Challenger finals ==
=== Doubles: 1 (0–1) ===
No.	Result	Date	Tournament	Surface	Partner	Opponents	Score
Loss	1.	Nov 1981	Benin City, Nigeria	Hard	(Zimbabwe) Haroon Ismail	(United Kingdom) Andrew Jarrett (United Kingdom) Richard Lewis	3–6, 4–6, 5–7
