= Peter Pearson (tennis) =

American tennis player (born 1955)

- Full name: Peter Ferdinand Pearson
- Country (sports): United States
- Born: August 12, 1955 (age 70) Sunnyvale, California, U.S.
- Plays: Left-handed

Singles
- Career record: 6–19
- Highest ranking: No. 153 (July 12, 1978)

Grand Slam singles results
- French Open: 1R (1978)
- Wimbledon: Q3 (1979)

Doubles
- Career record: 3–19

Grand Slam doubles results
- French Open: 1R (1978)
- Wimbledon: 1R (1979)

Peter Ferdinand Pearson (born August 12, 1955) is an American former professional tennis player.

== Tennis career ==
A left-handed player from California, Pearson was active on tour in the 1970s and 1980s. He made two quarter-finals on the Grand Prix circuit and took Vitas Gerulaitis to a final set tiebreak in a loss at the 1976 Fischer-Grand Prix. In 1978 he featured in the singles main draw of the French Open, where he fell in the first round to Tonino Zugarelli.

== Prison ==
Pearson is serving a life sentence at a state prison in Tuolumne County, California, after committing a series of bank robberies. Previously imprisoned on drug and theft charges, he was sentenced under California's three-strikes law.

== See also ==
- List of professional sportspeople convicted of crimes
