= 1979 Wimbledon Championships – Boys' singles =

Boys' singles
- 1979 Wimbledon Championships

Final
- Champion: (India) Ramesh Krishnan
- Runner-up: (United States) Dave Siegler
- Score: 6–0, 6–2

Events
Singles	men	women		boys	girls
Doubles	men	women	mixed	boys	girls
← 1978 ·	Wimbledon Championships	· 1980 →

Ramesh Krishnan defeated Dave Siegler in the final, 6–0, 6–2 to win the boys' singles tennis title at the 1979 Wimbledon Championships.

== Seeds ==
1. (India) Ramesh Krishnan (champion)
2. (United States) Dave Siegler (final)
3. (Sweden) Hans Simonsson (semifinals)
4. (United States) Ben Testerman (quarterfinals)
5. (Sweden) Stefan Svensson (semifinals)
6. (United States) Scott Davis (first round)
7. (Canada) Glenn Michibata (quarterfinals)
8. (Australia) Greg Whitecross (third round)

Click on the seed number of a player to go to their draw section.

== Draw ==
=== Key ===
- Q = Qualifier
- WC = Wild card
- LL = Lucky loser
- Alt = Alternate
- SE = Special exempt
- PR = Protected ranking
- ITF = ITF entry
- JE = Junior exempt
- w/o = Walkover
- r = Retired
- d = Defaulted
- SR = Special ranking

=== Finals ===
Quarterfinals
1	(India) Ramesh Krishnan	2	6	9
(South Africa) Schalk van der Merwe	6	3	7
5	(Sweden) Stefan Svensson	5	6	6
4	(United States) Ben Testerman	7	3	4
3	(Sweden) Hans Simonsson	7	7
(West Germany) Christoph Zipf	5	5
7	(Canada) Glenn Michibata	6	4
2	(United States) Dave Siegler	7	6

Semifinals
1	(India) Ramesh Krishnan	7	6
5	(Sweden) Stefan Svensson	6	2
3	(Sweden) Hans Simonsson	4	6	3
2	(United States) Dave Siegler	6	3	6

Final
1	(India) Ramesh Krishnan	6	6
2	(United States) Dave Siegler	0	2

=== Top half ===
==== Section 1 ====
First round
(Belgium) Pascal D'Hoop	2	7	2
(Malaysia) Suresh Menon	6	5	6
(Ecuador) Hugo Núñez	4	4
(France) Thierry Tulasne	6	6
8	(Australia) Greg Whitecross	6	6
(United Kingdom) Keith Gilbert	2	2
(Austria) Bernhard Pils	5	3
(South Africa) Schalk van der Merwe	7	6

Second round
1	(India) Ramesh Krishnan	6	6
(Malaysia) S Menon	0	1
(Malta) Gordon Asciak	1	3
(France) T Tulasne	6	6
8	(Australia) G Whitecross	6	6
(Norway) Sverre-Morten Blix	1	3
(West Germany) Hans-Dieter Beutel	4	6	1
(South Africa) S van der Merwe	6	3	6

Third round
1	(India) R Krishnan	6	6
(France) T Tulasne	2	2
8	(Australia) G Whitecross	4	3
(South Africa) S van der Merwe	6	6

Quarterfinals
1	(India) R Krishnan	2	6	9
(South Africa) S van der Merwe	6	3	7

==== Section 2 ====
First round
5	(Sweden) Stefan Svensson	7	6
(South Korea) Lee Woo-ryong	5	0
(Egypt) Tarek El-Sakka	6	7	3
(Denmark) Michael Mortensen	7	6	6
(Hong Kong) Kelvin Ng	2	6	6
(Thailand) Panomkorn Pladchurnil	6	1	1
(Sweden) Jan Gunnarsson	6	6	6
(Australia) Michael Fancutt	7	3	4

Second round
5	(Sweden) S Svensson	6	6
(Spain) Gabriel Urpí	3	4
(United Kingdom) Steve Shaw	0	3
(Denmark) M Mortensen	6	6
4	(United States) Ben Testerman	7	6
(Hong Kong) K Ng	5	4
(Sweden) J Gunnarsson	6	6
(South Africa) Trevor Raal	3	3

Third round
5	(Sweden) S Svensson	3	6	8
(Denmark) M Mortensen	6	4	6
4	(United States) B Testerman	6	7
(Sweden) J Gunnarsson	2	6

Quarterfinals
5	(Sweden) S Svensson	5	6	6
4	(United States) B Testerman	7	3	4

=== Bottom half ===
==== Section 3 ====
First round
(Pakistan) W Nasir	0	0
(Uruguay) Diego Pérez	6	6
(Japan) Shigeyuki Nishio	2	4
(South Africa) Christo Steyn	6	6
(Rhodesia) Philip Tuckniss	6	3	6
(Switzerland) Ivan Dupasquier	1	6	8
(West Germany) Christoph Zipf	6	6
6	(United States) Scott Davis	3	4

Second round
(Uruguay) D Pérez	4	2
(Socialist Federal Republic of Yugoslavia) Ivica Buljević	6	6
(South Africa) C Steyn	6	3	8
3	(Sweden) Hans Simonsson	3	6	10
(Switzerland) I Dupasquier	6	0
(United States) Bruce Brescia	7	6
(Trinidad and Tobago) Brian Yearwood	3	0
(West Germany) C Zipf	6	6

Third round
(Socialist Federal Republic of Yugoslavia) I Buljević	2	3
3	(Sweden) H Simonsson	6	6
(United States) B Brescia	6	2	5
(West Germany) C Zipf	1	6	7

Quarterfinals
3	(Sweden) H Simonsson	7	7
(West Germany) C Zipf	5	5

==== Section 4 ====
First round
(Israel) Tom Frischer	3	2
(Brazil) Pascual Penetta	6	6
(Romania) Florin Segărceanu	6	4	6
(Chile) Juan Carlos Ayala	2	6	3
(Australia) Craig Miller	5	4
(South Africa) Freddie Sauer	7	6
(New Zealand) Bruce Derlin	6	7
(Spain) Juan Avendaño	2	6

Second round
(Brazil) P Penetta	3	4
(United Kingdom) Jeremy Bates	6	6
(Romania) F Segărceanu	3	6	1
7	(Canada) Glenn Michibata	6	3	6
(South Africa) F Sauer	3	3
(Mexico) Héctor Ortiz	6	6
(New Zealand) B Derlin	3	2
2	(United States) D Siegler	6	6

Third round
(United Kingdom) J Bates	2	2
7	(Canada) G Michibata	6	6
(Mexico) H Ortiz	3	1
2	(United States) D Siegler	6	6

Quarterfinals
7	(Canada) G Michibata	6	4
2	(United States) D Siegler	7	6
