= Willie Davies (tennis) =

British tennis player

- Country (sports): Great Britain
- Born: 1955 (age 69–70); Lancashire, England

Singles
- Career record: 0–1
- Highest ranking: No. 454 (26 Dec 1979)

Grand Slam singles results
- Wimbledon: Q2 (1978, 1981, 1982, 1983)

Doubles
- Career record: 0–2
- Highest ranking: No. 610 (3 Jan 1983)

Grand Slam doubles results
- Wimbledon: 1R (1982)

Grand Slam mixed doubles results
- Wimbledon: 1R (1980)

Willie Davies (born 1955) is a British former professional tennis player.

A native of Southport, Davies was active during the 1970s and 1980s, featuring in doubles main draws at the Wimbledon Championships. He reached a best singles world ranking of 454 and also played collegiate tennis in Louisiana.
