= David Whyte (tennis) =

Australian tennis player

- Country (sports): Australia

Singles
- Career record: 0–4
- Highest ranking: No. 355 (12 July 1978)

Grand Slam singles results
- Australian Open: 1R (1978)
- Wimbledon: 1R (1979)

Doubles
- Career record: 0–1

Grand Slam doubles results
- Wimbledon: Q2 (1979)

David Whyte is an Australian former professional tennis player.

Whyte, who had a best world ranking of 355, qualified for two grand slam main draws during his career. At the 1978 Australian Open he was beaten in the first round by world number 21 Wojtek Fibak and at the 1979 Wimbledon Championships he lost his first round match to Ricardo Ycaza over four sets. He finished up on tour in 1980.
