= John Geraghty =

American tennis player

- Country (sports): United States
- Height: 5 ft 6 in (168 cm)
- Plays: Right-handed

Singles
- Highest ranking: No. 374 (Jan 3, 1979)

Grand Slam singles results
- Wimbledon: Q2 (1976)

Doubles
- Career record: 2–8
- Highest ranking: No. 180 (Jan 3, 1979)

Grand Slam doubles results
- Wimbledon: 1R (1979)
- US Open: 1R (1978)

Grand Slam mixed doubles results
- Wimbledon: 2R (1979)

John Geraghty is an American former professional tennis player.

Geraghty, who grew up in Hialeah, Florida, had a small build and was known more for finesse than power hitting.

Following two years with Appalachian State, Geraghty played collegiate tennis for the University of Miami and was an NCAA doubles quarter-finalist with John Eagleton in 1977, earning All-American honors. He was team captain in 1978.

Geraghty's career on tour included appearance at the Wimbledon Championships and US Open.
