= Nandan Bal =

Indian tennis player and coach

- Country (sports): India
- Born: 1 September 1959 (age 66)
- Plays: Right-handed

Singles
- Career record: 0–2
- Career titles: 9 (ITF)
- Highest ranking: No. 309 (22 December 1980)

Grand Slam singles results
- Wimbledon: Q3 (1979, 1980)

Doubles
- Career record: 0–1
- Highest ranking: No. 605 (23 March 1987)

Nandan Bal (born 1 September 1959) is an Indian tennis coach and former professional player. He has coached India in both the Davis Cup and Fed Cup since retiring as a player.

Bal, a right-handed player from Pune who represented India in two Davis Cup ties, was a singles silver medalist for India at the 1979 Universiade and also won a silver medal at the 1982 Asian Games, in the team event.

== Career ==
Bal played his first senior tournament in 1978 at the Calcutta International where he lost in the second round to Britisher Robin Drysdale. In 1980 he competed at the Greater Manchester Grass Court Tennis Championships in England, but exited early to the American Pat DuPré.

On his Davis Cup debut, against South Korea in the 1980 tournament, Bal had a singles win over Kim Choon-ho and partnered with Sashi Menon to a win in the doubles, before losing the deciding fifth singles rubber to Jeon Young-dai. His other Davis Cup appearance came against Thailand in 1983, with his contribution a win in the final reverse singles, to secure a 5–0 clean sweep of the tie.

His career singles highlights included winning nine titles five of which on the ITF World Circuit including the Indian National Championships three times 1983 to 1985, and the Zambia Open twice 1983 to 1984.

He also competed on the ITF Indian Satellite Circuit where he won four titles including the Pune Open and Indian Satellite Masters in 1980, the Yamuna Nagar Open in 1981 and the Bombay Satellite Open in 1986. He finished as winner of the Indian Satellite Circuit in 1980 and as runner-up to american Robert Blazekovic in 1981.

== See also ==
- List of India Davis Cup team representatives
