= 1979 Wimbledon Championships – Mixed doubles =

Mixed doubles
- 1979 Wimbledon Championships

Final
- Champions: (South Africa) Bob Hewitt (South Africa) Greer Stevens
- Runners-up: (South Africa) Frew McMillan (Netherlands) Betty Stöve
- Score: 7–5, 7–6^{(9–7)}

Details
- Draw: 48 (3 Q )
- Seeds: 8

Events
Singles	men	women		boys	girls
Doubles	men	women	mixed	boys	girls
← 1978 ·	Wimbledon Championships	· 1980 →

Bob Hewitt and Greer Stevens defeated the defending champions Betty Stöve and Frew McMillan in the final, 7–5, 7–6^{(9–7)} to win the mixed doubles tennis title at the 1979 Wimbledon Championships.

== Seeds ==
1. (South Africa) Frew McMillan / (Netherlands) Betty Stöve (final)
2. (South Africa) Bob Hewitt / (South Africa) Greer Stevens (champions)
3. (United States) Marty Riessen / (Australia) Wendy Turnbull (quarterfinals)
4. (Australia) John Newcombe / (Australia) Evonne Cawley (semifinals)
5. (Romania) Ion Țiriac / (Romania) Virginia Ruzici (third round)
6. n/a
7. (United Kingdom) John Lloyd / (United States) Rosie Casals (third round)
8. (Australia) Ross Case / (United States) Betty Ann Stuart (third round, withdrew)

Click on the seed number of a player to go to their draw section.

== Draw ==
=== Key ===
- Q = Qualifier
- WC = Wild card
- LL = Lucky loser
- Alt = Alternate
- SE = Special exempt
- PR = Protected ranking
- ITF = ITF entry
- JE = Junior exempt
- w/o = Walkover
- r = Retired
- d = Defaulted
- SR = Special ranking

=== Finals ===
Quarterfinals
1	(South Africa) Frew McMillan (Netherlands) Betty Stöve	6	6
(United Kingdom) David Lloyd (United Kingdom) Lesley Charles	1	2
3	(United States) Marty Riessen (Australia) Wendy Turnbull	7	4	2
(Australia) Kim Warwick (United States) Betsy Nagelsen	5	6	6
Q	(United States) David Sherbeck (United States) Jane Stratton	6	2	4
4	(Australia) John Newcombe (Australia) Evonne Cawley	1	6	6
(Australia) John Marks (Czechoslovakia) Renáta Tomanová	2	4
2	(South Africa) Bob Hewitt (South Africa) Greer Stevens	6	6

Semifinals
1	(South Africa) Frew McMillan (Netherlands) Betty Stöve	6	2	6
(Australia) Kim Warwick (United States) Betsy Nagelsen	2	6	2
4	(Australia) John Newcombe (Australia) Evonne Cawley	7	4	4
2	(South Africa) Bob Hewitt (South Africa) Greer Stevens	6	6	6

Final
1	(South Africa) Frew McMillan (Netherlands) Betty Stöve	5	6^{7}
2	(South Africa) Bob Hewitt (South Africa) Greer Stevens	7	7^{9}

=== Top half ===
==== Section 1 ====
First round
1	(South Africa) F McMillan (Netherlands) B Stöve	6	6
(Australia) R Carmichael (Australia) K Avis	3	4
(Australia) F Stolle (United States) B Potter	6	6
LL	(Australia) M Fancutt (Australia) A Tobin	3	2
(Chile) P Rodríguez (Chile) M Rodríguez	4	1
(United Kingdom) D Lloyd (United Kingdom) L Charles	6	6
(United Kingdom) J Smith (New Zealand) J Chaloner	7	7
(Australia) D Collings (Australia) N Gregory	5	5

Second round
1	(South Africa) F McMillan (Netherlands) B Stöve	6	6
(United States) J McManus (United States) M Carillo	2	0
(United States) C Pasarell (United States) J Russell	5	5
(Australia) F Stolle (United States) B Potter	7	7
(Switzerland) C Dowdeswell (United Kingdom) L Geeves	3	4
(United Kingdom) D Lloyd (United Kingdom) L Charles	6	6
(United Kingdom) J Smith (New Zealand) J Chaloner	4	6	7
7	(United Kingdom) J Lloyd (United States) R Casals	6	3	9

Third round
1	(South Africa) F McMillan (Netherlands) B Stöve	4	6	6
(Australia) F Stolle (United States) B Potter	6	0	1
(United Kingdom) D Lloyd (United Kingdom) L Charles	6	6
7	(United Kingdom) J Lloyd (United States) R Casals	2	3

Quarterfinals
1	(South Africa) F McMillan (Netherlands) B Stöve	6	6
(United Kingdom) D Lloyd (United Kingdom) L Charles	1	2

==== Section 2 ====
First round
3	(United States) M Riessen (Australia) W Turnbull	6	7
(United States) J Austin (United States) T Austin	0	5
(Australia) O Davidson (United States) D Desfor	4	6	6
(United Kingdom) A Jarrett (United Kingdom) D Jevans	6	3	1
(Jamaica) R Russell (United States) D Morrison	6	4	7
(Australia) K Warwick (United States) E Nagelsen	3	6	9
Q	(United Kingdom) M Appleton (Australia) P Whytcross	5	4
5	(Romania) I Țiriac (Romania) V Ruzici	7	6

Second round
3	(United States) M Riessen (Australia) W Turnbull	7	6
(United States) G Reid (Australia) K Reid	6	3
(Australia) C Kachel (South Africa) I Kloss	6	6
(Australia) O Davidson (United States) D Desfor	4	3
(Australia) K Warwick (United States) E Nagelsen	6	6
(Australia) M Edmondson (Australia) D Evers	1	4
(United Kingdom) R Drysdale (United Kingdom) J Lloyd	2	3
5	(Romania) I Țiriac (Romania) V Ruzici	6	6

Third round
3	(United States) M Riessen (Australia) W Turnbull	6	4	7
(Australia) C Kachel (South Africa) I Kloss	4	6	5
(Australia) K Warwick (United States) E Nagelsen	7	4	6
5	(Romania) I Țiriac (Romania) V Ruzici	6	6	2

Quarterfinals
3	(United States) M Riessen (Australia) W Turnbull	7	4	2
(Australia) K Warwick (United States) E Nagelsen	5	6	6

=== Bottom half ===
==== Section 3 ====
First round
(United Kingdom) R Lewis (United Kingdom) V Burton	6	6	3
Q	(United States) D Sherbeck (United States) J Stratton	7	4	6
(United Kingdom) M Farrell (United Kingdom) A Hobbs	3	6
(Uruguay) JL Damiani (Chile) S Urroz	6	7
(United States) B Testerman (United States) BJ King	w/o
(India) As Amritraj (United States) A Kiyomura
(South Africa) J Yuill (South Africa) B Cuypers	2	2
4	(Australia) J Newcombe (Australia) E Cawley	6	6

Second round
LL	(United Kingdom) J Whiteford (United Kingdom) J Plackett	2	2
Q	(United States) D Sherbeck (United States) J Stratton	6	6
(United States) R Crawford (United States) K Sands	6	6	5
(Uruguay) JL Damiani (Chile) S Urroz	7	4	7
(United States) B Testerman (United States) BJ King	6	6
(United Kingdom) R Taylor (United Kingdom) W Wooldridge	1	1
(United States) J Geraghty (United States) L Antonoplis	1	3
4	(Australia) J Newcombe (Australia) E Cawley	6	6

Third round
Q	(United States) D Sherbeck (United States) J Stratton	6	7
(Uruguay) JL Damiani (Chile) S Urroz	4	5
(United States) B Testerman (United States) BJ King	4	3
4	(Australia) J Newcombe (Australia) E Cawley	6	6

Quarterfinals
Q	(United States) D Sherbeck (United States) J Stratton	6	2	4
4	(Australia) J Newcombe (Australia) E Cawley	1	6	6

==== Section 4 ====
First round
Q	(Brazil) T Koch (Argentina) R Giscafré	6	3	3
(Australia) C Fancutt (Czechoslovakia) R Maršíková	4	6	6
(United States) A Lucchesi (United States) M Louie	6	3	2
(Australia) J Marks (Czechoslovakia) R Tomanová	3	6	6
(Australia) P Doerner (Australia) C Doerner	w/o
(Paraguay) F González (United States) P Teeguarden
(United Kingdom) J Feaver (United Kingdom) M Tyler	2	3
(United States) V Winitsky (United States) R Fox	6	6

Second round
8	(Australia) R Case (United States) BA Stuart	7	6
(Australia) C Fancutt (Czechoslovakia) R Maršíková	5	4
(India) An Amritraj (France) F Dürr	3	2
(Australia) J Marks (Czechoslovakia) R Tomanová	6	6
(Australia) P Doerner (Australia) C Doerner	6	3	6
LL	(United Kingdom) C Wells (United Kingdom) D Parker	3	6	4
(United States) V Winitsky (United States) R Fox	5	5
2	(South Africa) R Hewitt (South Africa) G Stevens	7	7

Third round
8	(Australia) R Case (United States) BA Stuart
(Australia) J Marks (Czechoslovakia) R Tomanová	w/o
(Australia) P Doerner (Australia) C Doerner	1	2
2	(South Africa) R Hewitt (South Africa) G Stevens	6	6

Quarterfinals
(Australia) J Marks (Czechoslovakia) R Tomanová	2	4
2	(South Africa) R Hewitt (South Africa) G Stevens	6	6
