= 1979 Wimbledon Championships – Men's doubles =

Men's doubles
- 1979 Wimbledon Championships

Final
- Champions: (United States) Peter Fleming (United States) John McEnroe
- Runners-up: (United States) Brian Gottfried (Mexico) Raúl Ramírez
- Score: 3–6, 6–4, 6–2, 6–1

Details
- Draw: 64 (5 Q )
- Seeds: 16

Events
Singles	men	women		boys	girls
Doubles	men	women	mixed	boys	girls
← 1978 ·	Wimbledon Championships	· 1980 →

Peter Fleming and John McEnroe defeated Brian Gottfried and Raúl Ramírez in the final, 4–6, 6–4, 6–2, 6–2 to win the gentlemen's doubles title at the 1979 Wimbledon Championships. It was both men's first major men's doubles title.

Bob Hewitt and Frew McMillan were the defending champions, but were defeated in the semifinals by Fleming and McEnroe.

== Seeds ==
1. (United States) Peter Fleming / (United States) John McEnroe (champions)
2. (Poland) Wojciech Fibak / (Netherlands) Tom Okker (first round)
3. (United States) Bob Lutz / (United States) Stan Smith (second round)
4. (South Africa) Bob Hewitt / (South Africa) Frew McMillan (semifinals)
5. (United States) Marty Riessen / (United States) Sherwood Stewart (second round)
6. (United States) Sandy Mayer / (United States) Gene Mayer (third round, withdrew)
7. (United States) Brian Gottfried / (Mexico) Raúl Ramírez (semifinals)
8. (Czechoslovakia) Jan Kodeš / (Czechoslovakia) Tomáš Šmíd (third round)
9. (Paraguay) Víctor Pecci / (Hungary) Balázs Taróczy (first round)
10. (Australia) Mark Edmondson / (Australia) John Marks (second round)
11. n/a
12. (Australia) John Alexander / (Australia) Phil Dent (quarterfinals)
13. (Australia) Ross Case / (Australia) Geoff Masters (quarterfinals)
14. (Switzerland) Colin Dowdeswell / (Switzerland) Heinz Günthardt (second round)
15. (United States) Tim Gullikson / (United States) Tom Gullikson (second round)
16. (United States) Bruce Manson / (Rhodesia) Andrew Pattison (first round)

Click on the seed number of a player to go to their draw section.

== Draw ==
=== Key ===
- Q = Qualifier
- WC = Wild card
- LL = Lucky loser
- Alt = Alternate
- ITF = ITF entry
- PR = Protected ranking
- SR = Special ranking
- SE = Special exempt
- JE = Junior exempt
- JR = Junior Accelerator Programme entrant
- CO = College Accelerator Programme entrant
- NG = Next Gen Accelerator Program entrant
- w/o = Walkover
- r = Retired
- d = Defaulted

=== Finals ===
Quarterfinals
1	(United States) Peter Fleming (United States) John McEnroe	6	6	6
13	(Australia) Ross Case (Australia) Geoff Masters	3	2	3
4	(South Africa) Bob Hewitt (South Africa) Frew McMillan	6	6	6	3	6
(Australia) Bob Carmichael (United States) Brian Teacher	3	3	7	6	4
7	(United States) Brian Gottfried (Mexico) Raúl Ramírez	6	6	6
(Australia) Paul Kronk (Australia) Cliff Letcher	4	4	4
(United States) John Sadri (United States) Tim Wilkison	4	6	6	6
12	(Australia) John Alexander (Australia) Phil Dent	6	4	2	4

Semifinals
1	(United States) Peter Fleming (United States) John McEnroe	6	7	6
4	(South Africa) Bob Hewitt (South Africa) Frew McMillan	3	6	1
7	(United States) Brian Gottfried (Mexico) Raúl Ramírez	6	2	7	3	6
(United States) John Sadri (United States) Tim Wilkison	4	6	5	6	3

Final
1	(United States) Peter Fleming (United States) John McEnroe	4	6	6	6
7	(United States) Brian Gottfried (Mexico) Raúl Ramírez	6	4	2	2

=== Top half ===
==== Section 1 ====
First round
1	(United States) P Fleming (United States) J McEnroe	4	7	6	6
Q	(Australia) J Fitzgerald (Australia) W Pascoe	6	5	2	1
Q	(United States) T Graham (Australia) R Ruffels	7	3	6	6	5
(South Africa) R Moore (United States) R Tanner	6	6	7	3	7
(United States) V Amaya (United Kingdom) C Mottram	7	6	6
(United Kingdom) C Bradnam (United Kingdom) A Jarrett	6	3	3
(United States) V Winitsky (Ecuador) R Ycaza	2	6	6	6
9	(Paraguay) V Pecci (Hungary) B Taróczy	6	3	2	2
13	(Australia) R Case (Australia) G Masters	6	6	7
(United Kingdom) R Beven (United Kingdom) J Paish	3	3	5
(United States) A Lucchesi (United States) G Taylor	0	2	5
(South Africa) B Mitton (South Africa) D Schneider	6	6	6
(Argentina) JL Clerc (Chile) P Rodríguez	6	7	4	6	7
(Australia) N Phillips (United Kingdom) J Smith	7	6	6	4	5
(Australia) S Ball (Australia) K Warwick	6	7	6	4	12
8	(Czechoslovakia) J Kodeš (Czechoslovakia) T Šmíd	4	5	7	6	14

Second round
1	(United States) P Fleming (United States) J McEnroe	7	7	6
(South Africa) R Moore (United States) R Tanner	5	6	3
(United States) V Amaya (United Kingdom) C Mottram	7	6	4	6	4
(United States) V Winitsky (Ecuador) R Ycaza	6	4	6	7	6
13	(Australia) R Case (Australia) G Masters	6	4	7	7	8
(South Africa) B Mitton (South Africa) D Schneider	7	6	5	5	6
(Argentina) JL Clerc (Chile) P Rodríguez	0	3	3
8	(Czechoslovakia) J Kodeš (Czechoslovakia) T Šmíd	6	6	6

Third round
1	(United States) P Fleming (United States) J McEnroe	6	6	6
(United States) V Winitsky (Ecuador) R Ycaza	3	2	4
13	(Australia) R Case (Australia) G Masters	6	4	7	7
8	(Czechoslovakia) J Kodeš (Czechoslovakia) T Šmíd	4	6	5	6

Quarterfinals
1	(United States) P Fleming (United States) J McEnroe	6	6	6
13	(Australia) R Case (Australia) G Masters	3	2	3

==== Section 2 ====
First round
4	(South Africa) R Hewitt (South Africa) F McMillan	6	7	6	3	6
(Egypt) I El Shafei (United States) D Ralston	7	6	2	6	4
(United States) C Pasarell (Australia) F Stolle	2	6	6
(Australia) D Collings (Australia) J Trickey	6	7	7
(United States) J Austin (United States) W Martin	5	6	6	1	6
(Paraguay) F González (South Africa) J Kriek	7	4	4	6	8
(Sweden) O Bengtson (United States) R Fisher	5	5	2
15	(United States) Ti Gullikson (United States) To Gullikson	7	7	6
LL	(Australia) V Eke (United Kingdom) M Farrell	3	6	4
(Australia) R Carmichael (United States) B Teacher	6	7	6
(United Kingdom) M Cox (United Kingdom) D Lloyd	7	6	6
(United Kingdom) J Feaver (Australia) J James	6	3	2
(Czechoslovakia) I Lendl (Czechoslovakia) P Složil	3	4	1
(India) A Amritraj (India) V Amritraj	6	6	6
(United States) R Crawford (Rhodesia) H Ismail	4	3	6	4
6	(United States) A Mayer (United States) E Mayer	6	6	4	6

Second round
4	(South Africa) R Hewitt (South Africa) F McMillan	2	6	6	3	6
(Australia) D Collings (Australia) J Trickey	6	2	3	6	0
(Paraguay) F González (South Africa) J Kriek	6	7	4	6
15	(United States) Ti Gullikson (United States) To Gullikson	3	5	6	4
(Australia) R Carmichael (United States) B Teacher	7	6	3	6
(United Kingdom) M Cox (United Kingdom) D Lloyd	6	3	6	3
(India) A Amritraj (India) V Amritraj	w/o
6	(United States) A Mayer (United States) E Mayer

Third round
4	(South Africa) R Hewitt (South Africa) F McMillan	7	6	4	3	6
(Paraguay) F González (South Africa) J Kriek	6	2	6	6	3
(Australia) R Carmichael (United States) B Teacher
6	(United States) A Mayer (United States) E Mayer	w/o

Quarterfinals
4	(South Africa) R Hewitt (South Africa) F McMillan	6	6	6	3	6
(Australia) R Carmichael (United States) B Teacher	3	3	7	6	4

=== Bottom half ===
==== Section 3 ====
First round
7	(United States) B Gottfried (Mexico) R Ramírez	6	6	6
(Australia) R Giltinan (Australia) C Kachel	2	3	4
(United Kingdom) R Drysdale (United Kingdom) R Lewis	6	6	7	3	12
(France) Y Noah (France) P Portes	4	7	6	6	10
Q	(Japan) S Nishio (Japan) S Sakamoto	2	6	2	2
(United States) N Saviano (United States) W Scanlon	6	4	6	6
(Australia) C Dibley (Australia) B Drewett	6	6	6	3	10
16	(United States) B Manson (United States) A Pattison	7	3	2	6	8
10	(Australia) M Edmondson (Australia) J Marks	7	6	5	6
(United States) W Maze (United States) F Taygan	5	4	7	3
(South Africa) C Drysdale (United Kingdom) R Taylor	6	6	6	6
Q	(United States) M Andrews (United States) D Sherbeck	3	2	7	1
(Australia) P Kronk (Australia) C Letcher	6	6	4	6	9
(United States) M Cahill (United States) P DuPré	7	3	6	3	7
(United States) D Bohrnstedt (United States) R Bohrnstedt	3	4	4
3	(United States) R Lutz (United States) S Smith	6	6	6

Second round
7	(United States) B Gottfried (Mexico) R Ramírez	7	7	6
(United Kingdom) R Drysdale (United Kingdom) R Lewis	6	6	2
(United States) N Saviano (United States) W Scanlon	2	6	7	2
(Australia) C Dibley (Australia) B Drewett	6	7	6	6
10	(Australia) M Edmondson (Australia) J Marks	6	4	6
(South Africa) C Drysdale (United Kingdom) R Taylor	7	6	7
(Australia) P Kronk (Australia) C Letcher	6	3	7	7
3	(United States) R Lutz (United States) S Smith	1	6	6	6

Third round
7	(United States) B Gottfried (Mexico) R Ramírez	6	6	6
(Australia) C Dibley (Australia) B Drewett	3	1	4
(South Africa) C Drysdale (United Kingdom) R Taylor	2	2	4
(Australia) P Kronk (Australia) C Letcher	6	6	6

Quarterfinals
7	(United States) B Gottfried (Mexico) R Ramírez	6	6	6
(Australia) P Kronk (Australia) C Letcher	4	4	4

==== Section 4 ====
First round
5	(United States) M Riessen (United States) S Stewart	6	2	5	7	6
(United States) H Pfister (United States) B Rowe	3	6	7	6	1
(Australia) O Davidson (Australia) J Newcombe	6	6	6	6
Q	(Australia) W Hampson (Australia) R Kelly	4	0	7	4
(United States) R Fagel (South Africa) J Yuill	2	2	4
(United States) J Sadri (United States) T Wilkison	6	6	6
(Australia) D Carter (Australia) A Gardiner	6	5	5
14	(Switzerland) C Dowdeswell (Switzerland) H Günthardt	7	7	7
12	(Australia) J Alexander (Australia) P Dent	6	6	4	6
LL	(United States) C Aguilar (United States) P Pearson	4	4	6	1
(United States) J Geraghty (United States) S Vuille	2	3	6
(United States) J Borowiak (Australia) P McNamara	6	6	7
(Chile) Á Fillol (Chile) J Fillol	4	7	3	3
(France) P Dominguez (France) G Moretton	6	6	6	6
(United Kingdom) A Lloyd (United Kingdom) J Lloyd	2	6	3	6	6
2	(Poland) W Fibak (Netherlands) T Okker	6	4	6	3	4

Second round
5	(United States) M Riessen (United States) S Stewart	3	6	3	6
(Australia) O Davidson (Australia) J Newcombe	6	4	6	7
(United States) J Sadri (United States) T Wilkison	7	7	6
14	(Switzerland) C Dowdeswell (Switzerland) H Günthardt	6	6	4
12	(Australia) J Alexander (Australia) P Dent	7	7	4	7
(United States) J Borowiak (Australia) P McNamara	6	6	6	5
(France) P Dominguez (France) G Moretton	4	4	5
(United Kingdom) A Lloyd (United Kingdom) J Lloyd	6	6	7

Third round
(Australia) O Davidson (Australia) J Newcombe	6	5	3
(United States) J Sadri (United States) T Wilkison	7	7	6
12	(Australia) J Alexander (Australia) P Dent	6	6	6	6
(United Kingdom) A Lloyd (United Kingdom) J Lloyd	4	7	2	4

Quarterfinals
(United States) J Sadri (United States) T Wilkison	4	6	6	6
(Australia) J Alexander (Australia) P Dent	6	4	2	4
