= Rohun Beven =

British tennis player

- Country (sports): (United Kingdom) Great Britain
- Born: 21 September 1957 (age 67); Hartfield, Sussex, England
- Plays: Left-handed

Singles
- Career record: 2–8
- Highest ranking: No. 296 (12 July 1978)

Grand Slam singles results
- Australian Open: Q1 (1979)
- Wimbledon: 1R (1979)

Doubles
- Career record: 1–13

Grand Slam doubles results
- Wimbledon: 1R (1977, 78, 79, 80, 81)
- US Open: 1R (1979)

Grand Slam mixed doubles results
- Wimbledon: 2R (1981)

Rohun Beven (born 21 September 1957) is a British former professional tennis player.

A left-handed player from Sussex, Beven was a Wimbledon junior quarter-finalist in 1975.

Beven qualified for the men's singles main draw of the 1979 Wimbledon Championships, where he lost his first round match in four sets to Paraguay's Francisco González. He featured in four further editions of the Wimbledon Championships in doubles main draws and also played doubles at the US Open.
