= Victor Eke =

Australian tennis player

- Full name: Victor Eke
- Country (sports): Australia
- Born: 11 November 1954 (age 70); Sydney, Australia

Singles
- Career record: 1-7

Doubles
- Career record: 10-17

Grand Slam doubles results
- Australian Open: 2R (1974, 1977 ^{Dec}, 1979)
- Wimbledon: 1R (1978, 1979, 1980)

Victor Eke (born 11 November 1954) is a former professional tennis player from Australia.

== Biography ==
Eke, who was born in the Sydney suburb of Caringbah, played on the professional tour in the 1970s.

As a singles player he was a finalist at the Queensland Open in 1978 and had a win over Ray Ruffels at a Grand Prix tournament in Hobart in 1979.

More successful in doubles, he made a Grand Prix semi-final partnering Wayne Hampson in Bournemouth and made several main draw appearances at both the Australian Open and Wimbledon. At the 1979 Australian Open he and Ernie Ewert eliminated third seeds Mark Edmondson and John Marks in the first round. He played his final year on tour in 1980.

Since retiring he has coached tennis in Victoria. In 1983 he and Paul McNamee established VicTennis, which is now known as the Kids Tennis Foundation. He is currently a high performance coach at TOTAL TENNIS in Melbourne. In 2014 Victor was inducted into the Tennis Coaches Australia Victoria Hall Of Fame.

== Challenger titles ==
=== Doubles: (2) ===
No.	Year	Tournament	Surface	Partner	Opponents	Score
1.	1979	Biarritz, France	Clay	(Australia) Ernie Ewert	(France) Hervé Gauvain (France) Jérôme Vanier	6–1, 6–4, 6–1
2.	1979	Royan, France	Clay	(Australia) Bob Carmichael	(Sweden) Ulf Eriksson (Sweden) Per Hjertquist	7–5, 6–2
