= Shigeyuki Nishio =

Japanese tennis player (born 1954)

- Native name: 西尾茂之
- Country (sports): Japan
- Born: 23 May 1954 (age 71); Kobe, Japan

Singles
- Career record: 4–15
- Highest ranking: No. 263 (31 December 1978)

Doubles
- Career record: 4–16
- Highest ranking: No. 307 (18 April 1988)

Grand Slam doubles results
- French Open: 1R (1980)
- Wimbledon: 1R (1979)

Shigeyuki Nishio (born 23 May 1954) is a Japanese former professional tennis player.

== Biography ==
Born in Kobe, Nishio was an aggressive serve and volley player whose Davis Cup career for Japan spanned nine years and a total of 13 ties.

At the 1978 Asian Games he finished with a silver medal in the men's singles, behind Indonesia's Atet Wijono. He also won bronze medals in the mixed doubles and team events.

All of his main draw appearances on the Grand Prix circuit came in his home country, which included making the round of 16 at the 1979 Japan Open Tennis Championships.

He played in two grand slam main draws, in the men's doubles at the 1979 Wimbledon Championships and 1980 French Open, both times partnering Shinichi Sakamoto.

== See also ==
- List of Japan Davis Cup team representatives
