= 1979 Wimbledon Championships – Girls' singles =

Girls' singles
- 1979 Wimbledon Championships

Final
- Champion: (United States) Mary-Lou Piatek
- Runner-up: (United States) Alycia Moulton
- Score: 6–1, 6–3

Events
Singles	men	women		boys	girls
Doubles	men	women	mixed	boys	girls
← 1978 ·	Wimbledon Championships	· 1980 →

Mary-Lou Piatek defeated Alycia Moulton in the final, 6–1, 6–3 to win the girls' singles tennis title at the 1979 Wimbledon Championships.

== Seeds ==
1. (United States) Andrea Jaeger (quarterfinals)
2. (Sweden) Lena Sandin (third round)
3. (United States) Mary-Lou Piatek (champion)
4. (United States) Linda Siegel (second round)
5. (United States) Alycia Moulton (final)
6. (West Germany) Helga Lütten (quarterfinals)
7. (Australia) Susan Leo (semifinals)
8. (West Germany) Claudia Kohde (third round)

Click on the seed number of a player to go to their draw section.

== Draw ==
=== Key ===
- Q = Qualifier
- WC = Wild card
- LL = Lucky loser
- Alt = Alternate
- SE = Special exempt
- PR = Protected ranking
- ITF = ITF entry
- JE = Junior exempt
- w/o = Walkover
- r = Retired
- d = Defaulted
- SR = Special ranking

=== Finals ===
Quarterfinals
1	(United States) Andrea Jaeger	4	4
(Switzerland) Isabelle Villiger	6	6
5	(United States) Alycia Moulton	6	6
(Socialist Federal Republic of Yugoslavia) Renata Šašak	0	2
3	(United States) Mary-Lou Piatek	6	6
6	(West Germany) Helga Lütten	4	2
7	(Australia) Susan Leo	6	6
(Italy) Barbara Rossi	4	2

Semifinals
(Switzerland) Isabelle Villiger	4	3
5	(United States) Alycia Moulton	6	6
3	(United States) Mary-Lou Piatek	6	6
7	(Australia) Susan Leo	3	2

Final
5	(United States) Alycia Moulton	1	3
3	(United States) Mary-Lou Piatek	6	6

=== Top half ===
==== Section 1 ====
First round
8	(West Germany) Claudia Kohde	6	6
(Sri Lanka) M Perera	1	0
(Hong Kong) Patricia Hy	1	1
(United Kingdom) Julie Walpole	6	6

Second round
1	(United States) Andrea Jaeger	7	6
(Austria) Andrea Pesak	5	4
(South Africa) Jennifer Mundel	4	3
(United Kingdom) Elizabeth Jones	6	6
8	(West Germany) C Kohde	6	6
(New Zealand) Arlene Rolleston	2	0
(United Kingdom) J Walpole	1	4
(Switzerland) Isabelle Villiger	6	6

Third round
1	(United States) A Jaeger	6	6
(United Kingdom) E Jones	4	2
8	(West Germany) C Kohde	5	2
(Switzerland) I Villiger	7	6

Quarterfinals
1	(United States) A Jaeger	4	4
(Switzerland) I Villiger	6	6

==== Section 2 ====
First round
(France) Caroline Franch	6	6
(India) Anu Peshawaria	2	0
(Poland) Dorota Dziekońska	3	6	3
(Canada) Karen Dewis	6	4	6

Second round
5	(United States) Alycia Moulton	6	6
(France) C Franch	0	3
(Sweden) Lena Jacobsson	6	7
(United Kingdom) Denise Taylor	2	6
4	(United States) Linda Siegel	6	4	5
(Socialist Federal Republic of Yugoslavia) Renata Šašak	3	6	7
(South Korea) Kim Soo-ok	4	3
(Canada) K Dewis	6	6

Third round
5	(United States) A Moulton	6	6
(Sweden) L Jacobsson	3	2
(Socialist Federal Republic of Yugoslavia) R Šašak	6	6
(Canada) K Dewis	2	2

Quarterfinals
5	(United States) A Moulton	6	6
(Socialist Federal Republic of Yugoslavia) R Šašak	0	2

=== Bottom half ===
==== Section 3 ====
First round
(Belgium) Nicole Mabille	6	4	0
(Finland) Pirjo Ojala	3	6	6
(Trinidad and Tobago) Beverly Corbie	2	4
(United Kingdom) Jackie Reardon	6	6

Second round
(South Africa) Susan Rollinson	6	6
(Finland) P Ojala	3	0
(Australia) Debbie Freeman	3	3
3	(United States) Mary-Lou Piatek	6	6
(United Kingdom) Lisa Pennington	6	3	7
(United Kingdom) J Reardon	4	6	9
(Pakistan) Mahmuda Jafarey	w/o
6	(West Germany) Helga Lütten

Third round
(South Africa) S Rollinson	6	2	2
3	(United States) M-L Piatek	1	6	6
(United Kingdom) J Reardon	3	5
(West Germany) H Lütten	6	7

Quarterfinals
3	(United States) M-L Piatek	6	6
6	(West Germany) H Lütten	4	2

==== Section 4 ====
First round
(Philippines) Pia Tamayo	6	6
(Norway) Heidi-Beate Christiansen	2	1
(Malta) Helen Degiorgio	1	1
7	(Australia) Susan Leo	6	6

Second round
(United Kingdom) Sonia Davies	7	3	7
(Philippines) P Tamayo	6	6	5
(Brazil) Cláudia Monteiro	1	6
7	(Australia) S Leo	6	7
(Japan) Yasuko Kabuto	2	1
(Italy) Barbara Rossi	6	6
(United Kingdom) Tina Sawyer	1	2
2	(Sweden) L Sandin	6	6

Third round
(United Kingdom) S Davies	1	1
7	(Australia) S Leo	6	6
(Italy) B Rossi	3	6	6
2	(Sweden) L Sandin	6	4	3

Quarterfinals
7	(Australia) S Leo	6	6
(Italy) B Rossi	4	2
