= Tim Gullikson =

American tennis player and coach

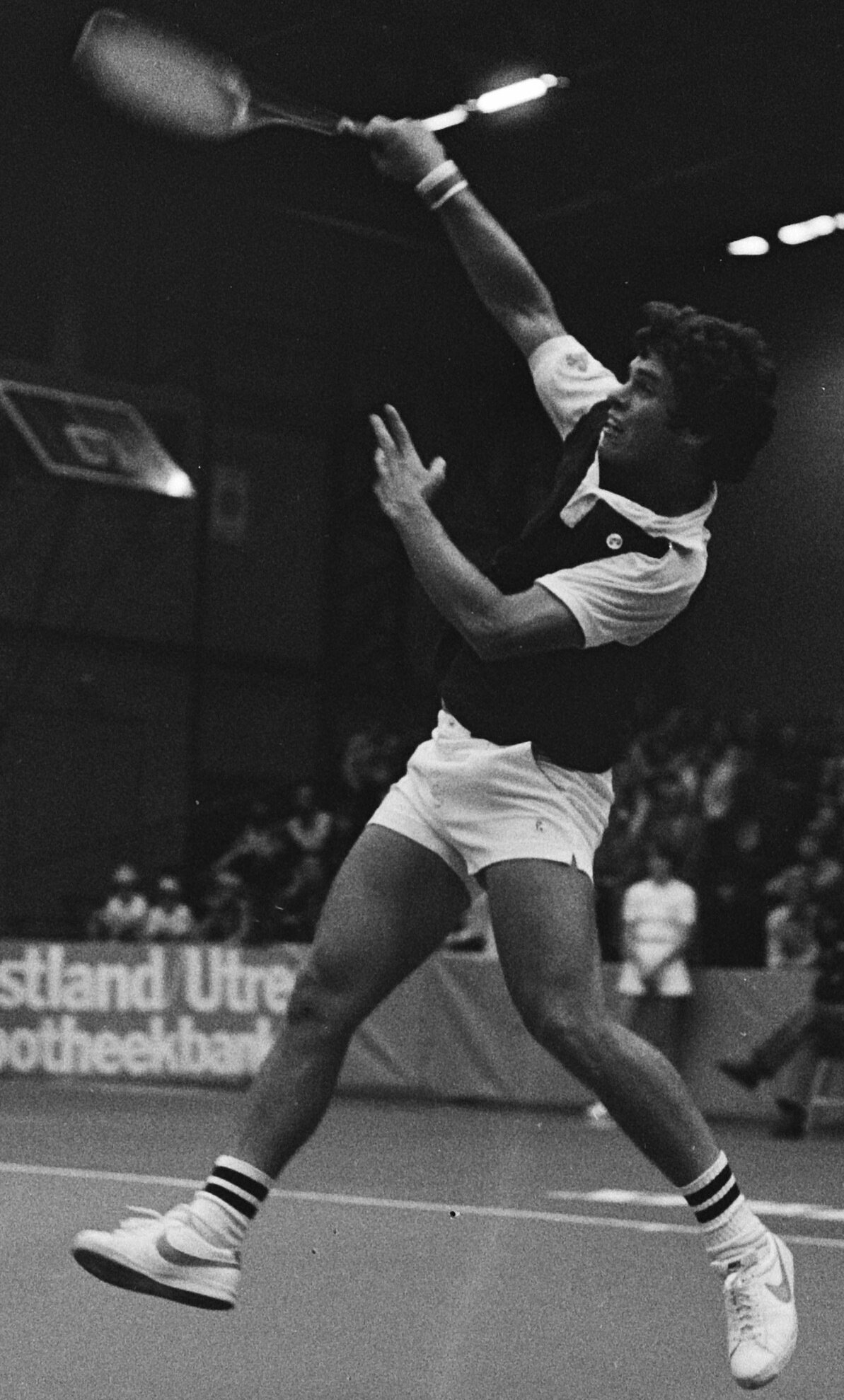
- Tim Gullikson (1978)
- Full name: Timothy Ernest Gullikson
- Country (sports): United States
- Born: September 8, 1951 La Crosse, Wisconsin, U.S.
- Died: May 3, 1996 (aged 44) Wheaton, Illinois, U.S.
- Height: 5 ft 11 in (1.80 m)
- Turned pro: 1977
- Retired: 1986
- Plays: Right-handed (1-handed backhand)
- Prize money: $1,121,880

Singles
- Career record: 271–222
- Career titles: 4
- Highest ranking: No. 15 (October 1, 1979)

Grand Slam singles results
- Australian Open: 4R (1983, 1985)
- French Open: 4R (1978, 1979)
- Wimbledon: QF (1979)
- US Open: 4R (1979)

Doubles
- Career record: 302–244
- Career titles: 15
- Highest ranking: No. 3 (September 12, 1983)

Grand Slam doubles results
- Australian Open: SF (1982, 1983)
- French Open: 3R (1977, 1978, 1979, 1980)
- Wimbledon: F (1983)
- US Open: SF (1982)

Coaching career (1987–1995)
- Martina Navratilova; Mary Joe Fernandez; Aaron Krickstein; Pete Sampras 1992–1995

Timothy Ernest Gullikson (September 8, 1951 – May 3, 1996) was a tennis player and coach who was born in La Crosse, Wisconsin and grew up in Onalaska, Wisconsin in the United States.

Gullikson was Pete Sampras' coach from 1992 to 1995.

== Tennis career ==
In 1977, he won three tour singles titles and was named the ATP's Newcomer of the Year. During his career as a tennis player, Gullikson won 15 top-level doubles titles, ten of them partnering with his identical twin brother, Tom Gullikson. The brothers were runners-up in the Men's Doubles competition at Wimbledon in 1983. Tim won a total of four top-level singles titles and reached the quarter-finals of the 1979 Wimbledon Championships, beating Mike Cahill, Tomáš Šmíd, Cliff Letcher and John McEnroe in the fourth round, before losing to Roscoe Tanner. His career-high rankings were World No. 15 in singles (in 1979) and World No. 3 in doubles (in 1983).

== Retirement and death ==
After retiring from the professional tour in 1986, Gullikson continued to play tennis in seniors events, winning the 35-over singles title at Wimbledon in 1991.

After retiring as a player, Gullikson turned his talents to coaching. He worked with several professional players, including Martina Navratilova, Mary Joe Fernández and Aaron Krickstein. Gullikson coached Pete Sampras from the start of 1992 until 1995, during which time Sampras won four Grand Slam singles titles and reached the World No. 1 ranking.

In late 1994, Gullikson had several seizures while touring with Sampras in Europe. The seizures were mistakenly traced to a congenital heart problem after German neurologists discovered a blood clot in his brain in December 1994. Gullikson insisted on accompanying Sampras to the Australian Open in January 1995 to help Sampras defend his title there, but collapsed during a practice session following another seizure. After tests at a Melbourne hospital proved inconclusive, Gullikson was sent home to Chicago for further testing, and the worried Sampras cried during his quarterfinal match against Jim Courier. Sampras dedicated that event – where he was runner-up to Andre Agassi – and all future events to his "great good friend" and mentor. Gullikson was later diagnosed with inoperable brain cancer.

Sampras went on to win 14 slams in his career, the remaining nine coming when Paul Annacone was his coach, Gullikson's successor.

Gullikson died in May 1996 at his home in Wheaton, Illinois. After his death, his identical twin brother Tom formed the Tim and Tom Gullikson Foundation, which funds programs to help brain tumor patients and their families with the physical, emotional and social challenges presented by the disease.

== Grand Slam finals ==
=== Doubles (1 runner-up) ===
Result	Year	Championship	Surface	Partner	Opponents	Score
Loss	1983	Wimbledon	Grass	(United States) Tom Gullikson	(United States) Peter Fleming (United States) John McEnroe	4–6, 3–6, 4–6

== Career statistics ==
=== Grand Slam performance timeline ===
Key
W	F	SF	QF	#R	RR	Q#	DNQ	A	NH

(W) winner; (F) finalist; (SF) semifinalist; (QF) quarterfinalist; (#R) rounds 4, 3, 2, 1; (RR) round-robin stage; (Q#) qualification round; (DNQ) did not qualify; (A) absent; (NH) not held; (SR) strike rate (events won / competed); (W–L) win–loss record.

Tournament	1977	1978	1979	1980	1981	1982	1983	1984	1985	1986	SR	W–L	Win
Australian Open	A	2R	A	A	A	1R	4R	3R	4R	NH	0 / 5	9–5	64.29%
French Open	2R	4R	4R	2R	A	A	A	A	A	A	0 / 4	8–4	66.66%
Wimbledon	4R	4R	QF	3R	3R	1R	3R	3R	1R	Q2	0 / 9	18–9	66.66%
US Open	1R	1R	A	2R	1R	1R	1R	1R	1R	1R	0 / 9	1–9	11.11%
Win–loss	4–3	7–4	7–2	4–3	2–2	0–3	5–3	4–3	3–3	0–1	0–27	36–27	57.14%
