= 1979 Wimbledon Championships – Women's doubles =

Tennis tournament

Women's doubles
- 1979 Wimbledon Championships

Final
- Champions: (United States) Billie Jean King (Czechoslovakia) Martina Navratilova
- Runners-up: (Netherlands) Betty Stöve (Australia) Wendy Turnbull
- Score: 5–7, 6–3, 6–2

Details
- Draw: 48 (4 Q )
- Seeds: 8

Events
Singles	men	women		boys	girls
Doubles	men	women	mixed	boys	girls
← 1978 ·	Wimbledon Championships	· 1980 →

Kerry Reid and Wendy Turnbull were the defending champions, but decided not to play together. Reid teamed up with Anne Smith and lost in third round to Françoise Dürr and Virginia Wade, while Turnbull teamed up with Betty Stöve.

Billie Jean King and Martina Navratilova defeated Stöve and Turnbull in the final, 5–7, 6–3, 6–2 to win the ladies' doubles tennis title at the 1979 Wimbledon Championships. It was the 10th Wimbledon title, 15th Grand Slam title for King, and the 2nd Wimbledon title, 5th Grand Slam title for Navratilova, in their respective doubles careers.

== Seeds ==
1. (United States) Billie Jean King / (Czechoslovakia) Martina Navratilova (champions)
2. (Netherlands) Betty Stöve / (Australia) Wendy Turnbull (final)
3. (France) Françoise Dürr / (United Kingdom) Virginia Wade (semifinals)
4. (United States) Rosie Casals / (United States) Chris Evert Lloyd (quarterfinals)
5. (Australia) Dianne Fromholtz / (South Africa) Marise Kruger (quarterfinals)
6. (Socialist Federal Republic of Yugoslavia) Mima Jaušovec / (Romania) Virginia Ruzici (semifinals)
7. (South Africa) Ilana Kloss / (United States) Betty Ann Stuart (quarterfinals)
8. (United Kingdom) Sue Barker / (United States) Ann Kiyomura (quarterfinals)

Click on the seed number of a player to go to their draw section.

== Draw ==
=== Key ===
- Q = Qualifier
- WC = Wild card
- LL = Lucky loser
- Alt = Alternate
- SE = Special exempt
- PR = Protected ranking
- ITF = ITF entry
- JE = Junior exempt
- w/o = Walkover
- r = Retired
- d = Defaulted
- SR = Special ranking

=== Finals ===
Quarterfinals
1	(United States) Billie Jean King (Czechoslovakia) Martina Navratilova	3	6	6
7	(South Africa) Ilana Kloss (United States) Betty Ann Stuart	6	3	0
3	(France) Françoise Dürr (United Kingdom) Virginia Wade	6	6
5	(Australia) Dianne Fromholtz (South Africa) Marise Kruger	4	2
6	(Socialist Federal Republic of Yugoslavia) Mima Jaušovec (Romania) Virginia Ruzici	7	7
4	(United States) Rosie Casals (United States) Chris Evert Lloyd	6	5
8	(United Kingdom) Sue Barker (United States) Ann Kiyomura	3	6	1
2	(Netherlands) Betty Stöve (Australia) Wendy Turnbull	6	1	6

Semifinals
1	(United States) Billie Jean King (Czechoslovakia) Martina Navratilova	6	6
3	(France) Françoise Dürr (United Kingdom) Virginia Wade	2	4
6	(Socialist Federal Republic of Yugoslavia) Mima Jaušovec (Romania) Virginia Ruzici	1	5
2	(Netherlands) Betty Stöve (Australia) Wendy Turnbull	6	7

Final
1	(United States) Billie Jean King (Czechoslovakia) Martina Navratilova	5	6	6
2	(Netherlands) Betty Stöve (Australia) Wendy Turnbull	7	3	2

=== Top half ===
==== Section 1 ====
First round
(South Africa) T Harford (United Kingdom) A Hobbs	6	6
(United States) B Jordan (United States) A Moulton	3	2
(United States) D Desfor (United States) B Hallquist	6	6
(United States) R Blount (Czechoslovakia) R Tomanová	2	2
(United States) P Bostrom (United States) M Redondo	7	3	6
(Japan) N Sato (Australia) P Whytcross	5	6	8
LL	(United Kingdom) A Coe (United Kingdom) C Molesworth	0	0
7	(South Africa) I Kloss (United States) BA Stuart	6	6

Second round
1	(United States) BJ King (Czechoslovakia) M Navratilova	6	4	6
(South Africa) T Harford (United Kingdom) A Hobbs	4	6	3
(United States) D Desfor (United States) B Hallquist	6	6
(United Kingdom) C Drury (United Kingdom) B Thompson	3	2
Q	(Australia) W Gilchrist (New Zealand) B Perry	6	7
(Japan) N Sato (Australia) P Whytcross	4	6
(United States) R Gerulaitis (United States) S Walsh	6	2
7	(South Africa) I Kloss (United States) BA Stuart	7	6

Third round
1	(United States) BJ King (Czechoslovakia) M Navratilova	6	6
(United States) D Desfor (United States) B Hallquist	3	4
Q	(Australia) W Gilchrist (New Zealand) B Perry	6	2
7	(South Africa) I Kloss (United States) BA Stuart	7	6

Quarterfinals
1	(United States) BJ King (Czechoslovakia) M Navratilova	3	6	6
7	(South Africa) I Kloss (United States) BA Stuart	6	3	0

==== Section 2 ====
First round
(South Africa) B Cuypers (United States) L duPont	7	0	6
(United States) K Jordan (United States) W White	5	6	4
(Australia) K Reid (United States) A Smith	6	2	6
(United States) J Russell (United States) K Teacher	4	6	2
(United States) K McDaniel (United States) N Yeargin	6	6
(Australia) N Gregory (Hungary) M Pinterová	3	2
Q	(Argentina) R Giscafré (United States) J Stratton	3	6	6
(Australia) C O'Neil (Sweden) M Wikstedt	6	2	2

Second round
3	(France) F Dürr (United Kingdom) V Wade	7	6
(South Africa) B Cuypers (United States) L duPont	6	3
(United States) S Acker (United States) M Carillo	3	2
(Australia) K Reid (United States) A Smith	6	6
(United States) K McDaniel (United States) N Yeargin	6	6
(Czechoslovakia) H Mandlíková (Czechoslovakia) R Maršíková	3	2
Q	(Argentina) R Giscafré (United States) J Stratton	6	1
5	(Australia) D Fromholtz (South Africa) M Kruger	7	6

Third round
3	(France) F Dürr (United Kingdom) V Wade	7	6
(Australia) K Reid (United States) A Smith	6	2
(United States) K McDaniel (United States) N Yeargin	0	1
5	(Australia) D Fromholtz (South Africa) M Kruger	6	6

Quarterfinals
3	(France) F Dürr (United Kingdom) V Wade	6	6
5	(Australia) D Fromholtz (South Africa) M Kruger	4	2

=== Bottom half ===
==== Section 3 ====
First round
6	(Socialist Federal Republic of Yugoslavia) M Jaušovec (Romania) V Ruzici	6	6	8
(Australia) C Doerner (United States) L Forood	7	4	6
(United Kingdom) J Durie (United Kingdom) D Jevans	7	7
(Italy) D Porzio (France) F Thibault	6	6
(Canada) M Blackwood (Australia) K Ruddell	5	2
(United States) L Allen (United States) R Fox	7	6
(South Africa) G Stevens (United States) P Teeguarden	6	6
(United Kingdom) L Charles (United Kingdom) G Coles	4	3

Second round
6	(Socialist Federal Republic of Yugoslavia) M Jaušovec (Romania) V Ruzici	7	6
(United States) MJ Louie (United States) M Louie	5	2
(United Kingdom) J Durie (United Kingdom) D Jevans	3	6	8
LL	(Italy) S Simmonds (United States) N Weigel	6	1	6
(United States) A-M Fernandez (United States) S Margolin	4	3
(United States) L Allen (United States) R Fox	6	6
(South Africa) G Stevens (United States) P Teeguarden	7	3	3
4	(United States) R Casals (United States) C Evert Lloyd	5	6	6

Third round
6	(Socialist Federal Republic of Yugoslavia) M Jaušovec (Romania) V Ruzici	6	6
(United Kingdom) J Durie (United Kingdom) D Jevans	3	1
(United States) L Allen (United States) R Fox	2	2
4	(United States) R Casals (United States) C Evert Lloyd	6	6

Quarterfinals
6	(Socialist Federal Republic of Yugoslavia) M Jaušovec (Romania) V Ruzici	7	7
4	(United States) R Casals (United States) C Evert Lloyd	6	5

==== Section 4 ====
First round
8	(United Kingdom) S Barker (United States) A Kiyomura	6	6
(United Kingdom) M Tyler (South Africa) Y Vermaak	3	3
Q	(United States) K Sands (United States) A Whitmore	6	5	6
(United States) J DuVall (United States) C Meyer	4	7	2
(United Kingdom) A Cooper (United Kingdom) J Fayter	3	4
(United States) L Antonoplis (Australia) D Evers	6	6
(Romania) M Simionescu (Netherlands) E Vessies-Appel	7	6
(Czechoslovakia) I Budařová (Czechoslovakia) H Strachoňová	5	4

Second round
8	(United Kingdom) S Barker (United States) A Kiyomura	6	6
(United States) D Gilbert (United States) L Siegel	4	2
Q	(Australia) K Hallam (United States) J Preyer	3	3
Q	(United States) K Sands (United States) A Whitmore	6	6
(United States) L Antonoplis (Australia) D Evers	6	6
(West Germany) B Bunge (United States) B Potter	4	2
(Romania) M Simionescu (Netherlands) E Vessies-Appel	2	1
2	(Netherlands) B Stöve (Australia) W Turnbull	6	6

Third round
8	(United Kingdom) S Barker (United States) A Kiyomura	6	2	6
Q	(United States) K Sands (United States) A Whitmore	2	6	4
(United States) L Antonoplis (Australia) D Evers	2	2
2	(Netherlands) B Stöve (Australia) W Turnbull	6	6

Quarterfinals
8	(United Kingdom) S Barker (United States) A Kiyomura	3	6	1
2	(Netherlands) B Stöve (Australia) W Turnbull	6	1	6
