= Noel Phillips (tennis) =

Australian tennis player

- Country (sports): Australia
- Born: 28 March 1950 (age 75)

Singles
- Career record: 7–17
- Highest ranking: No. 201 (12 July 1978)

Grand Slam singles results
- Australian Open: 2R (1977^{(Dec)})
- Wimbledon: 1R (1979)

Doubles
- Career record: 4–17

Grand Slam doubles results
- Australian Open: 2R (1978)
- Wimbledon: 1R (1979)

Noel Phillips (born 28 March 1950) is an Australian former professional tennis player.

A native of Sydney, Phillips played four years of collegiate tennis for Austin Peay State University in Tennessee. He was named OVC Player of the Year in both 1973 and 1974. After college he competed professionally and made the second round of the 1977 Australian Open, with a win over Bob Carmichael. He defeated Phil Dent en route to the round of 16 at the 1978 New South Wales Open and was a quarter-finalist at Sarasota in 1979.
