= Alejandro Cortes (tennis) =

Colombian tennis player

- Country (sports): Colombia
- Born: 14 July 1955 (age 70) Los Angeles, California, U.S.
- Plays: Right-handed

Singles
- Career record: 18–34
- Career titles: 0
- Highest ranking: No. 126 (4 January 1982)

Grand Slam singles results
- French Open: 1R (1980, 1982)
- Wimbledon: 1R (1979, 1982)
- US Open: 2R (1981)

Doubles
- Career record: 17–45
- Career titles: 0
- Highest ranking: No. 188 (3 January 1983)

Grand Slam doubles results
- French Open: 2R (1981)
- Wimbledon: 1R (1982)
- US Open: 1R (1981)

Alejandro Cortes (born 14 July 1955) is a former professional tennis player from Colombia.

== Career ==
Cortes, who was born in Los Angeles, represented the Colombian team in Davis Cup tennis. He appeared in six ties and won eight of his 15 rubbers, six in singles and two in doubles.

The Colombian was a quarter-finalist at his home event at Bogotá in 1979 and also reached the doubles semi-finals of the Quito Open that year, with José López-Maeso.

In 1981, Cortes won the only Grand Slam matches of his career. At the French Open he and doubles partner Ricardo Acuña defeated Argentina's Gattiker brothers, Alejandro and Carlos, in the opening round. He also had a win in the first round of singles draw the US Open, over Jimmy Brown. The right-hander was also a quarter-finalist at Viña del Mar in 1981, as well as a doubles semi-finalist in Santiago.

He made the quarter-finals at Båstad in 1982.
