= Robert Booth (tennis) =

British tennis player

- Country (sports): Great Britain
- Born: Hampshire, England
- Height: 6 ft 5 in (196 cm)

Singles
- Highest ranking: No. 549 (4 Jan 1981)

Grand Slam singles results
- Wimbledon: Q2 (1980)

Doubles
- Career record: 0–1

Grand Slam doubles results
- Wimbledon: 1R (1981)

Robert Booth is a British former professional tennis player.

Booth, a tall 196 cm player from Hampshire with a best singles world ranking of 549, made several attempts to qualify for the Wimbledon main draw during his career. In 1981 he qualified for the men's doubles main draw with Jörgen Windahl and they lost their first round match in five sets to the American pairing of Scott McCain and Steve Meister.
