= 1979 Wimbledon Championships – Men's singles =

Men's singles
- 1979 Wimbledon Championships

Final
- Champion: (Sweden) Björn Borg
- Runner-up: (United States) Roscoe Tanner
- Score: 6–7^{(4–7)}, 6–1, 3–6, 6–3, 6–4

Details
- Draw: 128 (16 Q / 8 WC )
- Seeds: 16

Events
Singles	men	women		boys	girls
Doubles	men	women	mixed	boys	girls
← 1978 ·	Wimbledon Championships	· 1980 →

Three-time defending champion Björn Borg defeated Roscoe Tanner in the final, 6–7^{(4–7)}, 6–1, 3–6, 6–3, 6–4 to win the gentlemen's singles tennis title at the 1979 Wimbledon Championships. It was his fourth Wimbledon title and eighth major title overall.

== Seeds ==
1. (Sweden) Björn Borg (champion)
2. (United States) John McEnroe (fourth round)
3. (United States) Jimmy Connors (semifinals)
4. (United States) Vitas Gerulaitis (first round)
5. (United States) Roscoe Tanner (final)
6. (Argentina) Guillermo Vilas (second round)
7. (United States) Arthur Ashe (first round)
8. (Paraguay) Víctor Pecci (third round)
9. (United States) Brian Gottfried (third round)
10. (Poland) Wojciech Fibak (first round)
11. (Australia) John Alexander (third round)
12. (Spain) José Higueras (second round)
13. (Spain) Manuel Orantes (second round)
14. (Argentina) José Luis Clerc (fourth round)
15. (United States) Tim Gullikson (quarterfinals)
16. (Italy) Corrado Barazzutti (first round)

Click on the seed number of a player to go to their draw section.

== Draw ==
=== Key ===
- Q = Qualifier
- WC = Wild card
- LL = Lucky loser
- Alt = Alternate
- ITF = ITF entry
- PR = Protected ranking
- SR = Special ranking
- SE = Special exempt
- JE = Junior exempt
- JR = Junior Accelerator Programme entrant
- CO = College Accelerator Programme entrant
- NG = Next Gen Accelerator Program entrant
- w/o = Walkover
- r = Retired
- d = Defaulted

=== Finals ===
Quarterfinals
1	(Sweden) Björn Borg	6	6	6
(Netherlands) Tom Okker	2	1	3
3	(United States) Jimmy Connors	6	4	7	6
(United States) Bill Scanlon	3	6	6	4
(Italy) Adriano Panatta	6	4	7^{7}	4	3
(United States) Pat DuPré	3	6	6^{3}	6	6
5	(United States) Roscoe Tanner	6	6	6	6
15	(United States) Tim Gullikson	1	4	7	2

Semifinals
1	(Sweden) Björn Borg	6	6	6
3	(United States) Jimmy Connors	2	3	2
(United States) Pat DuPré	3	6	3
5	(United States) Roscoe Tanner	6	7	6

Final
1	(Sweden) Björn Borg	6^{4}	6	3	6	6
5	(United States) Roscoe Tanner	7^{7}	1	6	3	4

=== Top half ===
==== Section 1 ====
First round
1	(Sweden) Björn Borg	3	6	7	6
(United States) Tom Gorman	6	4	5	1
(Australia) Mark Edmondson	7	6	3	2	2
(India) Vijay Amritraj	6	4	6	6	6
(United States) Hank Pfister	6	3	7	7
(Czechoslovakia) Jan Kodeš	3	6	6	6
(Chile) Jaime Fillol	6	3	2	4
(United States) Peter Fleming	3	6	6	6
(South Africa) David Schneider	6	7	6
(Australia) Bob Carmichael	4	6	1
(United States) Brian Teacher	6	3	6	7
(Australia) Colin Dibley	4	6	3	5
(Australia) Paul Kronk	2	2	4
(United States) Jeff Borowiak	6	6	6
WC	(United Kingdom) Andrew Jarrett	2	6	1
9	(United States) Brian Gottfried	6	7	6

Second round
1	(Sweden) B Borg	2	6	4	7	6
(India) V Amritraj	6	4	6	6	2
(United States) H Pfister	6	6	3	6
(United States) P Fleming	1	3	6	4
(South Africa) D Schneider	4	4	4
(United States) B Teacher	6	6	6
(United States) J Borowiak	6	4	4
9	(United States) B Gottfried	7	6	6

Third round
1	(Sweden) B Borg	6	6	6
(United States) H Pfister	4	1	3
(United States) B Teacher	6	7	5	6
9	(United States) B Gottfried	3	5	7	3

Fourth round
1	(Sweden) B Borg	6	5	6	7
(United States) B Teacher	4	7	4	5

==== Section 2 ====
First round
11	(Australia) John Alexander	6	7	4	7
(United States) Dick Stockton	1	6	6	5
(Switzerland) Heinz Günthardt	6	6	6
(South Africa) Bernard Mitton	4	1	3
WC	(United Kingdom) David Lloyd	2	6	5	3
Q	(New Zealand) Onny Parun	6	4	7	6
(United States) Gene Mayer	3	6	6	7
(United States) Victor Amaya	6	3	4	5
(Netherlands) Tom Okker	6	7	6
(Brazil) Roger Guedes	1	5	1
(South Africa) Cliff Drysdale	2	6	3
(United States) John Austin	6	7	6
(United States) Tim Wilkison	6	6	6
LL	(Australia) Noel Phillips	2	2	2
WC	(United Kingdom) Roger Taylor	3	2	4
6	(Argentina) Guillermo Vilas	6	6	6

Second round
11	(Australia) J Alexander	6	3	5	6	6
(Switzerland) H Günthardt	3	6	7	3	2
Q	(New Zealand) O Parun	4	1	2
(United States) E Mayer	6	6	6
(Netherlands) T Okker	7	6	3	6
(United States) J Austin	6	4	6	2
(United States) T Wilkison	5	6	6	7
6	(Argentina) G Vilas	7	2	1	6

Third round
11	(Australia) J Alexander	4	4	4
(United States) E Mayer	6	6	6
(Netherlands) T Okker	7	7	6
(United States) T Wilkison	5	5	4

Fourth round
(United States) E Mayer	6	7	4	4
(Netherlands) T Okker	7	5	6	6

==== Section 3 ====
First round
3	(United States) Jimmy Connors	6	6	7	6
(France) Jean-François Caujolle	2	7	5	3
Q	(Sweden) Ulf Eriksson	3	4	5
(United States) Marty Riessen	6	6	7
(South Africa) Johan Kriek	4	6	6	6
(Austria) Peter Feigl	6	3	3	0
LL	(Chile) Álvaro Fillol	5	1	6	3
Q	(Sweden) Jan Norbäck	7	6	3	6
(United States) Randy Crawford	2	2	4
(Hungary) Balázs Taróczy	6	6	6
(United Kingdom) Mark Cox	7	6	6
(West Germany) Karl Meiler	5	3	3
Q	(Colombia) Alejandro Cortes	5	7	2	0^{r}
Q	(France) Gilles Moretton	7	6	6	1
(South Africa) Ray Moore	6	7	6	6	4
13	(Spain) Manuel Orantes	7	6	7	4	6

Second round
3	(United States) J Connors	6	6	7	6
(United States) M Riessen	7	3	6	0
(South Africa) J Kriek	6	6	6
Q	(Sweden) J Norbäck	1	3	1
(Hungary) B Taróczy	4	6	3	6
(United Kingdom) M Cox	6	4	6	7
Q	(France) G Moretton	7	3	7	3	6
13	(Spain) M Orantes	6	6	6	6	1

Third round
3	(United States) J Connors	6	6	7
(South Africa) J Kriek	4	1	6
(United Kingdom) M Cox	3	6	6	7	7
Q	(France) G Moretton	6	7	1	6	5

Fourth round
3	(United States) J Connors	6	6	6
(United Kingdom) M Cox	2	1	1

==== Section 4 ====
First round
16	(Italy) Corrado Barazzutti	3	4	7	6	4
(Rhodesia) Andrew Pattison	6	6	5	4	6
Q	(Australia) John Fitzgerald	4	7	6	2
(Switzerland) Colin Dowdeswell	6	6	7	6
(Paraguay) Francisco González	4	6	6	6
Q	(United Kingdom) Rohun Beven	6	2	2	4
WC	(United Kingdom) Robin Drysdale	3	3	5
(United States) Bill Scanlon	6	6	7
(Australia) John Marks	5	6	6	2
Q	(Australia) Brad Drewett	7	2	7	6
(United States) Erick Iskersky	2	1	4
(Australia) John James	6	6	6
Q	(United States) Rick Fisher	5	1	6
(Australia) Phil Dent	7	6	7
(United States) Sherwood Stewart	5	2	3
8	(Paraguay) Víctor Pecci	7	6	6

Second round
(Rhodesia) A Pattison	6	6	6
(Switzerland) C Dowdeswell	3	4	0
(Paraguay) F González	6	4	4
(United States) W Scanlon	7	6	6
Q	(Australia) B Drewett	7	7	6
(Australia) J James	5	5	3
(Australia) P Dent	4	6	3
8	(Paraguay) V Pecci	6	7	6

Third round
(Rhodesia) A Pattison	6	6	4	2
(United States) W Scanlon	7	4	6	6
Q	(Australia) B Drewett	4	7	7	6
8	(Paraguay) V Pecci	6	6	6	4

Fourth round
(United States) W Scanlon	6	6	6	7
Q	(Australia) B Drewett	4	4	7	5

=== Bottom half ===
==== Section 5 ====
First round
7	(United States) Arthur Ashe	4	6	3
(Australia) Chris Kachel	6	7	6
(United Kingdom) John Lloyd	3	4	1
(Sweden) Ove Bengtson	6	6	6
(Australia) Alvin Gardiner	6	6	3	2	4
WC	(United Kingdom) Jonathan Smith	1	4	6	6	6
(Italy) Adriano Panatta	6	6	6
(Spain) Ángel Giménez	3	3	4
(United States) Sandy Mayer	6	6	6	6
Q	(United States) Charlie Pasarell	1	7	3	3
(Venezuela) Jorge Andrew	2	3	1
(Mexico) Raúl Ramírez	6	6	6
WC	(Egypt) Ismail El Shafei	6	3	6	7	4
(United States) John Sadri	3	6	7	6	6
LL	(South Africa) John Yuill	2	5	7	6	4
12	(Spain) José Higueras	6	7	5	3	6

Second round
(Australia) C Kachel	5	3	6	7	4
(Sweden) O Bengtson	7	6	0	6	6
WC	(United Kingdom) J Smith	6	2	7	5	3
(Italy) A Panatta	2	6	6	7	6
(United States) A Mayer	6	7	4	7
(Mexico) R Ramírez	3	6	6	6
(United States) J Sadri	6	5	6	7
12	(Spain) J Higueras	3	7	4	5

Third round
(Sweden) O Bengtson	6	6	6
(Italy) A Panatta	7	7	7
(United States) A Mayer	6	7	7	6
(United States) J Sadri	7	5	6	2

Fourth round
(Italy) A Panatta	7	6	7
(United States) A Mayer	6	3	6

==== Section 6 ====
First round
10	(Poland) Wojciech Fibak	6	7	4	2	7
(United States) Bruce Manson	4	6	6	6	9
Q	(United States) Fritz Buehning	6	6	6
Q	(United States) Richard Meyer	3	4	4
(United States) Bob Lutz	6	6	6
(Canada) Réjean Genois	3	2	2
(Ecuador) Ricardo Ycaza	6	1	6	6
Q	(Australia) David Whyte	4	6	2	0
(France) Yannick Noah	7	6	7
LL	(India) Ramesh Krishnan	6	3	5
(United States) Nick Saviano	6	6	6
(United States) Rick Fagel	0	1	2
(Brazil) Carlos Alberto Kirmayr	6	4	3	6	6
WC	(United Kingdom) John Feaver	1	6	6	3	4
(United States) Pat DuPré	7	6	3	3	6
4	(United States) Vitas Gerulaitis	6	3	6	6	3

Second round
(United States) B Manson	7	4	6	6
Q	(United States) F Buehning	6	6	4	4
(United States) R Lutz	6	6	6
(Ecuador) R Ycaza	0	3	2
(France) Y Noah	6	6	7
(United States) N Saviano	3	4	5
(Brazil) C Kirmayr	6	6	3	4
(United States) P DuPré	4	7	6	6

Third round
(United States) B Manson	7	4	3	2
(United States) R Lutz	6	6	6	6
(France) Y Noah	5	6	3	1
(United States) P DuPré	7	1	6	6

Fourth round
(United States) R Lutz	6	5	6	4	6
(United States) P DuPré	3	7	4	6	8

==== Section 7 ====
First round
5	(United States) Roscoe Tanner	6	6	6
(United States) Van Winitsky	1	4	4
(Australia) Peter McNamara	6	6	6
(Czechoslovakia) Ivan Lendl	3	2	3
(France) Pascal Portes	1	6	6	6
(United States) Ferdi Taygan	6	4	4	4
(United States) Billy Martin	5	7	2	6	2
(Australia) Ross Case	7	6	6	4	6
Q	(Brazil) Cássio Motta	5	3	4
(Uruguay) José Luis Damiani	7	6	6
(Australia) David Carter	1	6	4	1
(United States) Stan Smith	6	2	6	6
(Australia) Dale Collings	6	3	6	5
(Spain) Antonio Muñoz	7	6	3	7
Q	(Australia) Bob Giltinan	4	6	3	6	3
14	(Argentina) José Luis Clerc	6	3	6	3	6

Second round
5	(United States) R Tanner	6	7	6
(Australia) P McNamara	1	6	4
(France) P Portes	2	1	5
(Australia) R Case	6	6	7
(Uruguay) JL Damiani	3	2	6
(United States) S Smith	6	6	7
(Spain) A Muñoz	1	3	4
14	(Argentina) JL Clerc	6	6	6

Third round
5	(United States) R Tanner	6	7	7
(Australia) R Case	4	5	6
(United States) S Smith	7	6	3	5
14	(Argentina) JL Clerc	6	7	6	7

Fourth round
5	(United States) R Tanner	6	7	6	6
14	(Argentina) JL Clerc	7	6	4	1

==== Section 8 ====
First round
15	(United States) Tim Gullikson	6	6	6
(United States) Mike Cahill	4	2	4
(Rhodesia) Haroon Ismail	5	6	2
(Czechoslovakia) Tomáš Šmid	7	7	6
(Australia) Kim Warwick	6	1	6	6
Q	(Australia) Cliff Letcher	7	6	2	7
(France) Patrice Dominguez	6	6	6
(Czechoslovakia) Pavel Huťka	3	3	4
(India) Anand Amritraj	3	6	6
(West Germany) Andreas Maurer	6	7	7
(Czechoslovakia) Pavel Složil	6	2	1	6	1
(United States) Tom Gullikson	4	6	6	3	6
WC	(United Kingdom) Richard Lewis	4	3	5
(United Kingdom) Buster Mottram	6	6	7
(United States) Terry Moor	5	1	4
2	(United States) John McEnroe	7	6	6

Second round
15	(United States) Ti Gullikson	7	6	6	6
(Czechoslovakia) T Šmid	5	7	2	4
Q	(Australia) C Letcher	6	3	6	6
(France) P Dominguez	1	6	3	4
(West Germany) A Maurer	1	4	4
(United States) To Gullikson	6	6	6
(United Kingdom) C Mottram	7	2	6	2
2	(United States) J McEnroe	6	6	7	6

Third round
15	(United States) Ti Gullikson	6	6	6
Q	(Australia) C Letcher	0	4	1
(United States) To Gullikson	4	4	6
2	(United States) J McEnroe	6	6	7

Fourth round
15	(United States) Ti Gullikson	6	6	6
2	(United States) J McEnroe	4	2	4

Preceded by 1979 French Open	Grand Slams; Men's Singles	Succeeded by 1979 U.S. Open
