= Frank Punčec =

South African tennis player

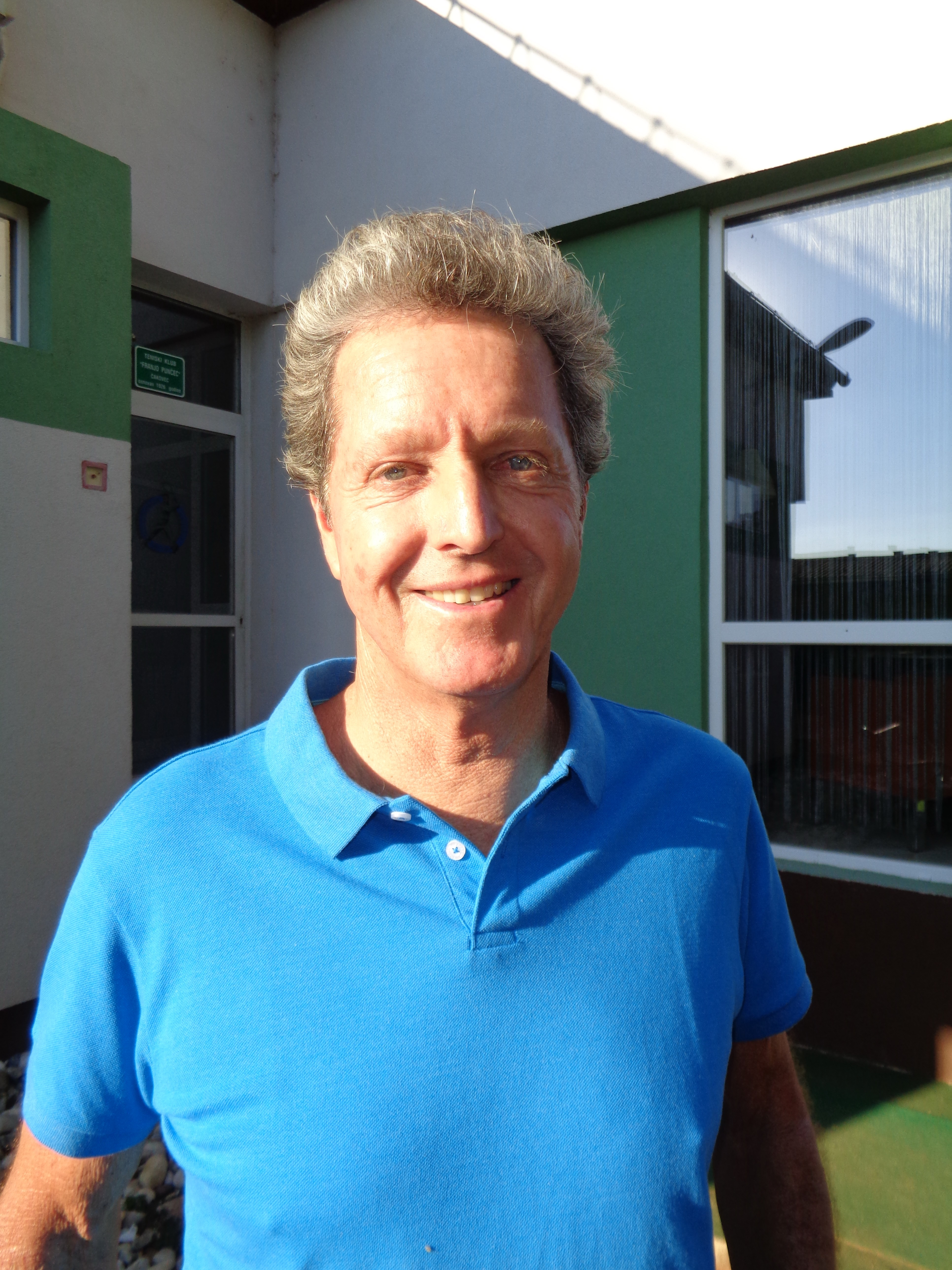
- Frank Punčec photographed during a visit to Čakovec, the home town of his parents
- Country (sports): South Africa
- Born: 9 July 1951 (age 74)

Singles
- Career record: 0–9
- Highest ranking: No. 179 (3 January 1983)

Grand Slam singles results
- French Open: 1R (1983)

Doubles
- Career record: 1–14

Frank Punčec (born 9 July 1951) is a South African former professional tennis player.

== Biography ==
Punčec is the son of Croatian tennis player Franjo Punčec, who played for the Yugoslav Davis Cup team. His parents emigrated to South Africa in 1948 and Frank was born soon after in 1951, one of three children to Franjo and Zora.

As a professional player in the 1980s he reached a best singles ranking of 179 in the world. Most notably he featured in the main draw of the 1983 French Open, where he was beaten in the first round by countryman Danie Visser.

A car collector in his spare time, Punčec owns a range of BMW E9 CS coupés.
