= Greg Whitecross =

Australian tennis player

- Country (sports): Australia
- Born: 15 March 1961 (age 64); Melbourne, Australia
- Height: 6 ft 1 in (185 cm)
- Plays: Right-handed
- Coach: Don Tregonning

Singles
- Career record: 10–36
- Career titles: 0
- Highest ranking: No. 161 (4 Jan 1982)

Grand Slam singles results
- Australian Open: 1R (79, 80, 81, 82, 83, 84)
- Wimbledon: 1R (1982)
- US Open: 1R (1980)

Doubles
- Career record: 10–30
- Career titles: 0
- Highest ranking: No. 134 (2 Jan 1984)

Grand Slam doubles results
- Australian Open: 2R (1980, 82, 83, 84)
- French Open: 1R (1984)
- Wimbledon: 2R (1980)

Greg Whitecross (born 15 March 1961) is a former professional tennis player from Australia.

== Junior career ==
Whitecross was the boys' singles champion at the 1979 Australian Open, defeating Craig Miller in the final. He won the doubles title as well, with Michael Fancutt.

In 1979, he was also a quarter-finalist in the French Open and made the round of 16 at Wimbledon.

== Professional career ==
Whitecross competed in the main singles draw at the Australian Open six times, without ever making it past the opening round. The closest he came was in the 1982 Australian Open when he lost to Damir Keretić in five sets, after claiming the first two. He also appeared at least once at the other three Grand Slam tournaments, playing in the 1980 US Open (beaten by Víctor Pecci), the 1980 Wimbledon Championships (in the men's doubles), the 1982 Wimbledon Championships (lost to Eddie Edwards), the 1984 Wimbledon Championships (in the mixed doubles), and the 1984 French Open (in the men's doubles).

On the Grand Prix circuit, Whitecross had his best performances at the South Australian Open. In 1982, he had wins over Mike Leach and Jeff Borowiak, before exiting at the quarter-final stage, to Broderick Dyke. At the South Australian Open the following year, he made the doubles semi-finals, with partner Mark Lewis.

== Challenger titles ==
=== Singles: (1) ===
No.	Year	Tournament	Surface	Opponent	Score
1.	1980	Maebashi, Japan	Hard	(Australia) Craig A. Miller	2–6, 6–4, 7–6

=== Doubles: (1) ===
No.	Year	Tournament	Surface	Partner	Opponents	Score
1.	1983	Lee-on-the-Solent, UK	Clay	(Australia) Charlie Fancutt	(United Kingdom) Andrew Jarrett (United Kingdom) Jonathan Smith	6–3, 3–6, 6–4
