= Charlie Fancutt =

Australian tennis player

- Country (sports): Australia
- Born: 17 June 1959 (age 65); Brisbane, Australia
- Height: 178 cm (5 ft 10 in)
- Plays: Right-handed
- Prize money: $67,880

Singles
- Career record: 22–40
- Career titles: 0
- Highest ranking: No. 123 (4 Jan 1982)

Grand Slam singles results
- Australian Open: 4R (1982)
- Wimbledon: 2R (1981, 1983)

Doubles
- Career record: 35–53
- Career titles: 0
- Highest ranking: No. 94 (6 May 1985)

Grand Slam doubles results
- Australian Open: 2R (1977, 1984, 1985)
- French Open: 2R (1984, 1985)
- Wimbledon: 2R (1984, 1985)
- US Open: 2R (1979)

Mixed doubles

Grand Slam mixed doubles results
- French Open: SF (1984)
- Wimbledon: 2R (1979, 81, 85, 86)

Charlie Fancutt (born 17 June 1959) is a former professional tennis player from Australia.

== Career ==
Fancutt won the boys' doubles title at the 1976 Australian Open (partnering Peter McCarthy). He upset Ivan Lendl in the opening round of the 1981 Wimbledon Championships, winning in five sets. At the 1982 Australian Open, Fancutt made the fourth round, where he lost to Johan Kriek. Fancutt made the mixed doubles semi-finals at the 1984 French Open, with Marie-Christine Calleja. He was a singles quarter-finalist at three Grand Prix tournaments during his career, the 1979 Heineken Open and at both Brisbane and Manila in 1981.

== Family ==
Fancutt is the son of two former tennis players. His mother, Daphne, made the 1956 Wimbledon women's doubles final and his father, Trevor, was a South African Davis Cup player who won the mixed doubles title at the 1960 Australian Championships. He also had two tennis playing brothers, Chris Fancutt, who appeared on the Challenger circuit and Michael Fancutt, who competed regularly in Grand Prix doubles tournaments.

== Challenger titles ==
=== Doubles: (1) ===
No.	Year	Tournament	Surface	Partner	Opponents	Score
1.	1983	Lee-on-the-Solent, UK	Clay	(Australia) Greg Whitecross	(United Kingdom) Andrew Jarrett (United Kingdom) Jonathan Smith	6–3, 3–6, 6–4
