= Gilles Moretton =

French tennis player

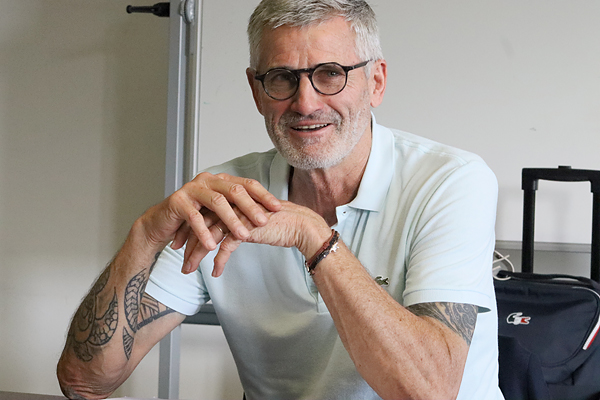
- Country (sports): France
- Born: 10 February 1958 (age 68) Lyon, France
- Height: 1.91 m (6 ft 3 in)
- Plays: Right-handed

Singles
- Career record: 61–93
- Career titles: 0
- Highest ranking: No. 80 (4 January 1982)

Grand Slam singles results
- Australian Open: 1R (1978)
- French Open: 4R (1979)
- Wimbledon: 3R (1979)
- US Open: 2R (1981, 1983)

Doubles
- Career record: 69–80
- Career titles: 4
- Highest ranking: No. 55 (2 January 1984)

Gilles Moretton (French: [ʒil mɔʁtɔ̃]; born 10 February 1958) is a former professional tennis player from France. He enjoyed most of his tennis success while playing doubles. During his career, he won four doubles titles. He achieved a career-high doubles ranking of world No. 55 in 1984.

Since 2001, he has been president of ASVEL Lyon-Villeurbanne, one of France's top basketball clubs.

In February 2021 he was elected president of the French Tennis Federation (FFT).

== Career finals ==
=== Singles (1 runner-up) ===
Result	W/L	Date	Tournament	Surface	Opponent	Score
Loss	0–1	Aug 1981	Atlanta, U.S.	Hard	(United States) Mel Purcell	4–6, 2–6

=== Doubles (4 titles, 2 runner-ups) ===
Result	W/L	Date	Tournament	Surface	Partner	Opponents	Score
Loss	0–1	Oct 1978	Barcelona, Spain	Clay	(France) Jean-Louis Haillet	(Socialist Federal Republic of Yugoslavia) Željko Franulović (Chile) Hans Gildemeister	1–6, 4–6
Loss	0–2	Dec 1978	Calcutta, India	Clay	(France) Yannick Noah	(India) Sashi Menon (United States) Sherwood Stewart	6–7, 4–6
Win	1–2	Feb 1979	Linz, Austria	Hard (i)	(France) Patrice Dominguez	(Hungary) Szabolcs Baranyi (Hungary) Péter Szőke	6–1, 6–4
Win	2–2	Nov 1979	Paris Indoor, France	Hard (i)	(France) Jean-Louis Haillet	(United Kingdom) John Lloyd (United Kingdom) Tony Lloyd	7–6, 7–6
Win	3–2	Sep 1980	Bordeaux, France	Clay	(United Kingdom) John Feaver	(Italy) Gianni Ocleppo (Ecuador) Ricardo Ycaza	6–3, 6–2
Win	4–2	Apr 1983	Aix-en-Provence, France	Clay	(France) Henri Leconte	(Chile) Iván Camus (Spain) Sergio Casal	2–6, 6–1, 6–2
