= 1979 Wimbledon Championships =

- Date: 25 June – 7 July
- Edition: 93rd
- Category: Grand Slam
- Draw: 128S/64D/48XD
- Prize money: £277,066
- Surface: Grass
- Location: Church Road; SW19, Wimbledon, London, United Kingdom
- Venue: All England Lawn Tennis and Croquet Club

Champions

Men's singles
- (Sweden) Björn Borg

Women's singles
- (United States) Martina Navratilova

Men's doubles
- (United States) Peter Fleming / (United States) John McEnroe

Women's doubles
- (United States) Billie Jean King / (United States) Martina Navratilova

Mixed doubles
- (South Africa) Bob Hewitt / (South Africa) Greer Stevens

Boys' singles
- (India) Ramesh Krishnan

Girls' singles
- (United States) Mary-Lou Piatek
← 1978 ·	Wimbledon Championships	· 1980 →

The 1979 Wimbledon Championships was a tennis tournament that took place on the outdoor grass courts at the All England Lawn Tennis and Croquet Club in Wimbledon, London, United Kingdom. The tournament ran from 25 June until 7 July. It was the 93rd staging of the Wimbledon Championships, and the second Grand Slam tennis event of 1979.

This edition was the first to introduce the tiebreak with the scores at 6–6 instead of 8–8.

== Prize money ==
The total prize money for 1979 championships was £277,066. The winner of the men's title earned £20,000 while the women's singles champion earned £18,000.

Event	W	F	SF	QF	Round of 16	Round of 32	Round of 64	Round of 128
Men's singles	£20,000	£10,000	£5,000	£2,500	£1,500	£760	£440	£265
Women's singles	£18,000	£8,750	£4,375	£2,000	£1,160	£585	£340	£200
Men's doubles *	£8,000	£4,000	£2,000	£1,000	£520	£170	£80	—
Women's doubles *	£6,930	£3,464	£1,600	£800	£364	£116	£54	—
Mixed doubles *	£4,200	£2,100	£1,000	£500	£250	£0	£0	—

_{* per team}

== Champions ==
=== Seniors ===
==== Men's singles ====
(Sweden) Björn Borg defeated (United States) Roscoe Tanner, 6–7^{(4–7)}, 6–1, 3–6, 6–3, 6–4

- It was Borg's 8th career Grand Slam title, and his 4th Wimbledon title.

==== Women's singles ====
(United States) Martina Navratilova defeated (United States) Chris Evert Lloyd, 6–4, 6–4

- It was Navratilova's 2nd career Grand Slam title, and her 2nd (consecutive) Wimbledon title.

==== Men's doubles ====
(United States) Peter Fleming / (United States) John McEnroe defeated (United States) Brian Gottfried / (Mexico) Raúl Ramírez, 4–6, 6–4, 6–2, 6–2

==== Women's doubles ====
(United States) Billie Jean King / (United States) Martina Navratilova defeated (Netherlands) Betty Stöve / (Australia) Wendy Turnbull, 5–7, 6–3, 6–2

- This was King's 20th Wimbledon title overall, surpassing Elizabeth Ryan's record of 19 overall titles. This record was subsequently matched by Navratilova in 2003.

==== Mixed doubles ====
(South Africa) Bob Hewitt / (South Africa) Greer Stevens defeated (South Africa) Frew McMillan / (Netherlands) Betty Stöve, 7–5, 7–6^{(9–7)}

=== Juniors ===
==== Boys' singles ====
(India) Ramesh Krishnan defeated (United States) Dave Siegler, 6–0, 6–2

==== Girls' singles ====
(United States) Mary-Lou Piatek defeated (United States) Alycia Moulton, 6–1, 6–3

== Singles seeds ==
=== Men's singles ===
1. (Sweden) Björn Borg (champion)
2. (United States) John McEnroe (fourth round, lost to Tim Gullikson)
3. (United States) Jimmy Connors (semifinals, lost to Björn Borg)
4. (United States) Vitas Gerulaitis (first round, lost to Pat DuPré)
5. (United States) Roscoe Tanner (final, lost to Björn Borg)
6. (Argentina) Guillermo Vilas (second round, lost to Tim Wilkison)
7. (United States) Arthur Ashe (first round, lost to Chris Kachel)
8. (Paraguay) Víctor Pecci (third round, lost to Brad Drewett)
9. (United States) Brian Gottfried (third round, lost to Brian Teacher)
10. (Poland) Wojciech Fibak (first round, lost to Bruce Manson)
11. (Australia) John Alexander (third round, lost to Gene Mayer)
12. (Spain) José Higueras (second round, lost to John Sadri)
13. (Spain) Manuel Orantes (second round, lost to Gilles Moretton)
14. (Argentina) José Luis Clerc (fourth round, lost to Roscoe Tanner)
15. (United States) Tim Gullikson (quarterfinals, lost to Roscoe Tanner)
16. (Italy) Corrado Barazzutti (first round, lost to Andrew Pattison)

=== Women's singles ===
1. (United States) Martina Navratilova (champion)
2. (United States) Chris Evert Lloyd (final, lost to Martina Navratilova)
3. (Australia) Evonne Goolagong Cawley (semifinals, lost to Chris Evert Lloyd)
4. (United States) Tracy Austin (semifinals, lost to Martina Navratilova)
5. (United Kingdom) Virginia Wade (quarterfinals, lost to Evonne Goolagong Cawley)
6. (Australia) Dianne Fromholtz (quarterfinals, lost to Martina Navratilova)
7. (United States) Billie Jean King (quarterfinals, lost to Tracy Austin)
8. (Australia) Wendy Turnbull (quarterfinals, lost to Chris Evert Lloyd)
9. (Australia) Kerry Reid (fourth round, lost to Wendy Turnbull)
10. (Romania) Virginia Ruzici (fourth round, lost to Tracy Austin)
11. (South Africa) Greer Stevens (fourth round, lost to Martina Navratilova)
12. (United Kingdom) Sue Barker (first round, lost to Ivanna Madruga)
13. (Czechoslovakia) Regina Maršíková (third round, lost to Hana Mandlíková)
14. (United States) Kathy Jordan (fourth round, lost to Evonne Goolagong Cawley)
15. (Netherlands) Betty Stöve (fourth round, lost to Dianne Fromholtz)
16. (United States) Pam Shriver (second round, withdrew)

Preceded by 1979 French Open	Grand Slams	Succeeded by 1979 US Open
