= 1978 Stockholm Open – Singles =

Singles
- 1978 Stockholm Open

Final
- Champion: (United States) John McEnroe
- Runner-up: (United States) Tim Gullikson
- Score: 6–2, 6–2

Details
- Draw: 64
- Seeds: 16

Events
Singles	Doubles
← 1977 ·	Stockholm Open	· 1979 →

Sandy Mayer was the defending champion, but lost in the third round this year.

McEnroe successfully defended his title, defeating Tim Gullikson 6–2, 6–2 in the final.

The tournament featured the first ever meeting of John McEnroe and Björn Borg, in the semifinals.

== Seeds ==
1. (Sweden) Björn Borg (semifinals)
2. (United States) Eddie Dibbs (first round)
3. (United States) John McEnroe (champion)
4. (United States) Brian Gottfried (third round)
5. (Italy) Corrado Barazzutti (first round)
6. (United States) Harold Solomon (first round)
7. (United States) Roscoe Tanner (third round)
8. (United States) Sandy Mayer (third round)
9. (Romania) Ilie Năstase (third round)
10. (United States) Arthur Ashe (quarterfinals)
11. (United States) Dick Stockton (first round)
12. (Poland) Wojtek Fibak (semifinals)
13. (United States) Tim Gullikson (final)
14. (United Kingdom) John Lloyd (first round)
15. (United States) Stan Smith (quarterfinals)
16. (United States) Peter Fleming (quarterfinals)

== Draw ==
=== Key ===
- Q = Qualifier
- WC = Wild card
- LL = Lucky loser
- Alt = Alternate
- ITF = ITF entry
- PR = Protected ranking
- SR = Special ranking
- SE = Special exempt
- JE = Junior exempt
- JR = Junior Accelerator Programme entrant
- CO = College Accelerator Programme entrant
- NG = Next Gen Accelerator Program entrant
- w/o = Walkover
- r = Retired
- d = Defaulted

=== Finals ===
Semifinals
1	(Sweden) Björn Borg	3	4
3	(United States) John McEnroe	6	6
12	(Poland) Wojtek Fibak	3	3
13	(United States) Tim Gullikson	6	6

Final
3	(United States) John McEnroe	6	6
13	(United States) Tim Gullikson	2	2

=== Top half ===
==== Section 1 ====
First round
1	(Sweden) B Borg	6	6
(United States) J Austin	3	1
(United States) T Waltke	6	4	3
(South Africa) B Mitton	4	6	6
(South Africa) F McMillan	7	6
(United States) B Manson	6	4
Q	(United States) J Sadri	4	6
9	(Romania) I Năstase	6	7
16	(United States) P Fleming	4	6	6
(France) C Roger-Vasselin	6	0	1
Q	(Sweden) U Eriksson	7	7
(United States) A Pattison	6	6
(United States) D Bohrnstedt	5	7	1
(Czechoslovakia) I Lendl	7	6	6
(Australia) J James	6	1
8	(United States) S Mayer	7	6

Second round
1	(Sweden) B Borg	6	6
(South Africa) B Mitton	2	4
(South Africa) F McMillan	2	4
9	(Romania) I Năstase	6	6
16	(United States) P Fleming	6	5	6
Q	(Sweden) U Eriksson	4	7	4
(Czechoslovakia) I Lendl	5	6
8	(United States) S Mayer	7	7

Third round
1	(Sweden) B Borg	6	6
9	(Romania) I Năstase	4	3
16	(United States) P Fleming	6	6
8	(United States) S Mayer	3	3

Quarterfinals
1	(Sweden) B Borg	6	6
16	(United States) P Fleming	4	4

==== Section 2 ====
First round
3	(United States) J McEnroe	6	6
Q	(Sweden) Per Larsson	1	3
(Czechoslovakia) J Granát	2	4
(Sweden) S Simonsson	6	6
(Czechoslovakia) J Kodeš	6	6
(West Germany) W Zirngibl	3	2
(West Germany) K Meiler	6	6
14	(United Kingdom) J Lloyd	2	4
11	(United States) D Stockton	6	6	5
(Italy) A Panatta	3	7	7
(Italy) A Zugarelli	3	1
(Czechoslovakia) T Šmíd	6	6
(Egypt) I El Shafei	3	7	4
(Netherlands) T Okker	6	6	6
(Sweden) P Hjertquist	3	6	6
6	(United States) H Solomon	6	1	3

Second round
3	(United States) J McEnroe	6	6
(Sweden) S Simonsson	2	4
(Czechoslovakia) J Kodeš	7	6
(West Germany) K Meiler	5	4
(Italy) A Panatta	7	6
(Czechoslovakia) T Šmíd	6	4
(Netherlands) T Okker	6	4	6
(Sweden) P Hjertquist	4	6	1

Third round
3	(United States) J McEnroe	7	6
(Czechoslovakia) J Kodeš	5	0
(Italy) A Panatta	6	1
(Netherlands) T Okker	7	6

Quarterfinals
3	(United States) J McEnroe	6	7
(Netherlands) T Okker	3	6

=== Bottom half ===
==== Section 3 ====
First round
5	(Italy) C Barazzutti	4	6
(Sweden) ON Bengtson	6	7
(United Kingdom) R Drysdale	7
(India) V Amritraj	6	r
(India) A Amritraj	6	3
(Switzerland) H Günthardt	7	6
(Sweden) T Svensson	3	2
10	(United States) A Ashe	6	6
12	(Poland) W Fibak	6	6
Q	(United States) P Pearson	1	0
(United States) G Hardie	6	6
(South Africa) B Hewitt	3	2
(Sweden) J Källqvist	2	3
(United States) R Lutz	6	6
(Czechoslovakia) J Hřebec	6	2
4	(United States) B Gottfried	7	6

Second round
(Sweden) ON Bengtson	6	6	7
(United Kingdom) R Drysdale	2	7	6
(Switzerland) H Günthardt	6	0	4
10	(United States) A Ashe	4	6	6
12	(Poland) W Fibak	6	6
(United States) G Hardie	4	2
(United States) R Lutz	6	3
4	(United States) B Gottfried	7	6

Third round
(Sweden) ON Bengtson	3	2
10	(United States) A Ashe	6	6
12	(Poland) W Fibak	6	4	6
4	(United States) B Gottfried	2	6	2

Quarterfinals
10	(United States) A Ashe	6	4
12	(Poland) W Fibak	7	6

==== Section 4 ====
First round
7	(United States) R Tanner	6	6
(Czechoslovakia) S Birner	3	2
Q	(Sweden) D Palm	2	7	6
(United Kingdom) M Cox	6	5	1
(South Africa) J Kriek	7	6	5
(United States) To Gullikson	6	7	7
Q	(United States) F Taygan	4	3
15	(United States) S Smith	6	6
13	(United States) Ti Gullikson	7	6
(Australia) C Letcher	6	3
(United States) E van Dillen	4	6
(Czechoslovakia) V Zedník	6	7
(South Africa) R Moore	2	6
Q	(Sweden) J Norbäck	6	7
(United States) V Amaya	6	3	6
2	(United States) E Dibbs	3	6	3

Second round
7	(United States) R Tanner	6	6	6
Q	(Sweden) D Palm	3	7	2
(United States) To Gullikson	6	6
15	(United States) S Smith	7	7
13	(United States) Ti Gullikson	6	6
(Czechoslovakia) V Zedník	4	4
Q	(Sweden) J Norbäck	4	1
(United States) V Amaya	6	6

Third round
7	(United States) R Tanner	3	6
15	(United States) S Smith	6	7
13	(United States) Ti Gullikson	6	6
(United States) V Amaya	4	1

Quarterfinals
15	(United States) S Smith	4	4
13	(United States) Ti Gullikson	6	6

== See also ==
- Borg–McEnroe rivalry
