= 1977 Stockholm Open – Singles =

Singles
- 1977 Stockholm Open

Final
- Champion: (United States) Sandy Mayer
- Runner-up: (South Africa) Raymond Moore
- Score: 6–2, 6–4

Details
- Draw: 64
- Seeds: 2

Events
Singles	Doubles
- Stockholm Open

Mark Cox was the defending champion, but lost in the second round this year.

Sandy Mayer won the title, defeating Raymond Moore 6–2, 6–4 in the final.

== Seeds ==
1. (United States) Brian Gottfried (third round)
2. (Mexico) Raúl Ramírez (third round)

== Draw ==
Key

- Q = Qualifier
- WC = Wild card
- LL = Lucky loser
- Alt = Alternate
- ITF = ITF entry
- PR = Protected ranking
- SR = Special ranking
- SE = Special exempt
- JE = Junior exempt
- JR = Junior Accelerator Programme entrant
- CO = College Accelerator Programme entrant
- NG = Next Gen Accelerator Program entrant
- w/o = Walkover
- r = Retired
- d = Defaulted

=== Finals ===
Semifinals
(United States) Sandy Mayer	6	6
(United States) Stan Smith	4	1
(South Africa) Raymond Moore	6	7
(Poland) Wojtek Fibak	3	6

Final
(United States) Sandy Mayer	6	6
(South Africa) Raymond Moore	2	4

=== Top half ===
==== Section 1 ====
First round
1	(United States) B Gottfried	6	6
Q	(Sweden) T Larsen	1	4
(Sweden) R Norberg	6	6
(South Africa) J Yuill	3	1
(United Kingdom) R Drysdale	6	6	6
(South Africa) F McMillan	7	3	2
(Czechoslovakia) T Šmíd	2	5
(United States) S Mayer	6	7
(The Bahamas) J Antonas	1	1
(South Africa) B Bertram	6	6
(United States) E van Dillen	3	7	4
(United States) T Waltke	6	6	6
(Sweden) P Hjertquist	2	3
(Australia) J James	6	6
(United States) S Stewart	3	3
(United States) H Solomon	6	6

Second round
1	(United States) B Gottfried	6	6
(Sweden) R Norberg	2	4
(United Kingdom) R Drysdale	0	4
(United States) S Mayer	6	6
(South Africa) B Bertram	2	4
(United States) T Waltke	6	6
(Australia) J James	2	4
(United States) H Solomon	6	6

Third round
1	(United States) B Gottfried	4	4
(United States) S Mayer	6	6
(United States) T Waltke	3	5
(United States) H Solomon	6	7

Quarterfinals
(United States) S Mayer	6	6
(United States) H Solomon	3	4

==== Section 2 ====
First round
(United States) E Dibbs	6	6	5
(United States) K Richardson	7	3	7
(United States) R Fisher	6	4
(United States) G Hardie	7	6
(Sweden) J Källqvist	4	6
(Sweden) T Svensson	6	7
Q	(Sweden) Hans Goransson	6	3
(Hungary) B Taróczy	7	6
(Czechoslovakia) J Kodeš	6	7
(Australia) B Lloyd	1	5
(Sweden) D Palm	6	6
(United States) M Machette	3	2
(United States) B Martin	6	6
Q	(Sweden) O Palmer	3	1
Q	(Sweden) S Simonsson	3	6	1
(United States) S Smith	6	3	6

Second round
(United States) K Richardson	6	4	5
(United States) G Hardie	4	6	7
(Sweden) T Svensson	6	2	6
(Hungary) B Taróczy	1	6	3
(Czechoslovakia) J Kodeš	6	6
(Sweden) D Palm	3	0
(United States) B Martin	3	4
(United States) S Smith	6	6

Third round
(United States) G Hardie	6	6
(Sweden) T Svensson	4	2
(Czechoslovakia) J Kodeš	1	6	4
(United States) S Smith	6	4	6

Quarterfinals
(United States) G Hardie	7	4	5
(United States) S Smith	6	6	7

=== Bottom half ===
==== Section 3 ====
First round
(United States) J Borowiak	6	3	4
(Sweden) K Johansson	2	6	6
Q	(United States) G Oropez	2	6	5
(Australia) B Phillips-Moore	6	1	7
(Czechoslovakia) F Pala	2	3
(France) J-L Haillet	6	6
(Paraguay) F González	6	6	7
(United States) R Lutz	4	7	6
(South Africa) R Moore	2	7	6
(United Kingdom) J Lloyd	6	6	2
(Sweden) ON Bengtson	1	4
(Czechoslovakia) P Hutka	6	6
(United Kingdom) J Feaver	4	6
(United Kingdom) R Taylor	6	7
(South Africa) B Mitton	2	2
(United Kingdom) M Cox	6	6

Second round
(Sweden) K Johansson	6	6
(Australia) B Phillips-Moore	1	1
(France) J-L Haillet	6	5	6
(Paraguay) F González	1	7	1
(South Africa) R Moore	6	7
(Czechoslovakia) P Hutka	2	6
(United Kingdom) R Taylor	6	6
(United Kingdom) M Cox	4	4

Third round
(Sweden) K Johansson	4	7	6
(France) J-L Haillet	6	6	2
(South Africa) R Moore	6	5	6
(United Kingdom) R Taylor	2	7	3

Quarterfinals
(Sweden) K Johansson	7	5	4
(South Africa) R Moore	5	7	6

==== Section 4 ====
First round
(Poland) W Fibak	6	6	6
(Sweden) B Andersson	7	2	3
(Sweden) U Eriksson	5	6	6
(Sweden) J Norbäck	7	3	4
(United States) E Friedler	3	6	4
(India) A Amritraj	6	3	6
(United States) F McNair	6	6	5
(Netherlands) T Okker	7	4	7
(United States) P Fleming	7	4	6
(United States) A Pattison	5	6	7
(United States) B Teacher	6	7
(Denmark) L Elvstrøm	3	5
(Czechoslovakia) J Granát	3	3
(United States) C Pasarell	6	6
(United States) D Martin Jr.	2	1
2	(Mexico) R Ramírez	6	6

Second round
(Poland) W Fibak	6	6
(Sweden) U Eriksson	2	1
(India) A Amritraj	2	1
(Netherlands) T Okker	6	6
(United States) A Pattison	6	3	6
(United States) B Teacher	4	6	7
(United States) C Pasarell	6	5	3
2	(Mexico) R Ramírez	4	7	6

Third round
(Poland) W Fibak	6	6
(Netherlands) T Okker	2	2
(United States) B Teacher	7	4	6
2	(Mexico) R Ramírez	5	6	4

Quarterfinals
(Poland) W Fibak	7	4	7
(United States) B Teacher	5	6	6
