= 1979 Stockholm Open – Men's singles =

Men's singles
- 1979 Stockholm Open

Final
- Champion: (United States) John McEnroe
- Runner-up: (United States) Gene Mayer
- Score: 6–7, 6–3, 6–3

Details
- Draw: 64
- Seeds: 16

Events
Singles	men	women
Doubles	men	women
← 1978 ·	Stockholm Open	· 1980 →

John McEnroe was the defending champion.

McEnroe successfully defended his title, defeating Gene Mayer 6–7, 6–3, 6–3 in the final.

== Seeds ==
1. (United States) John McEnroe (champion)
2. (United States) Harold Solomon (quarterfinals)
3. (United States) Peter Fleming (quarterfinals)
4. (United States) Gene Mayer (final)
5. (Poland) Wojtek Fibak (semifinals)
6. (United States) Tim Gullikson (quarterfinals)
7. (United States) Brian Gottfried (semifinals, retired)
8. (United States) Stan Smith (second round)
9. N/A
10. (France) Yannick Noah (first round)
11. N/A
12. N/A
13. (Czechoslovakia) Tomáš Šmíd (third round)
14. (United States) Marty Riessen (second round)
15. (India) Vijay Amritraj (third round)
16. (United States) Hank Pfister (third round)

== Draw ==
=== Key ===
- Q = Qualifier
- WC = Wild card
- LL = Lucky loser
- Alt = Alternate
- ITF = ITF entry
- PR = Protected ranking
- SR = Special ranking
- SE = Special exempt
- JE = Junior exempt
- JR = Junior Accelerator Programme entrant
- CO = College Accelerator Programme entrant
- NG = Next Gen Accelerator Program entrant
- w/o = Walkover
- r = Retired
- d = Defaulted

=== Finals ===
Semifinals
1	(United States) John McEnroe	6	7
5	(Poland) Wojtek Fibak	4	5
4	(United States) Gene Mayer	6	0
7	(United States) Brian Gottfried	1	0^{r}

Final
1	(United States) John McEnroe	6	6	6
4	(United States) Gene Mayer	7	3	3

=== Top half ===
==== Section 1 ====
First round
1	(United States) J McEnroe	6	3	6
Q	(Israel) S Glickstein	0	6	3
Q	(United States) F Buehning	6	6
Q	(Denmark) L Elvstrøm	3	4
(Spain) M Mir	3	3
(Australia) S Docherty	6	6
(Austria) P Feigl	3	6	3
LL	(Sweden) U Eriksson	6	2	6
10	(France) Y Noah	7	4	5
(United States) G Hardie	5	6	7
(South Africa) R Moore	6	6
(Italy) A Zugarelli	3	4
(United States) N Saviano	6	6
(Sweden) K Johansson	3	4
(Sweden) O Bengtson	1	2
8	(United States) S Smith	6	6

Second round
1	(United States) J McEnroe	4	6	6
Q	(United States) F Buehning	6	2	2
(Australia) S Docherty	6	7
LL	(Sweden) U Eriksson	3	6
(United States) G Hardie	5	4
(South Africa) R Moore	7	6
(United States) N Saviano	6	6	7
8	(United States) S Smith	7	4	6

Third round
1	(United States) J McEnroe	6	6
(Australia) S Docherty	1	3
(South Africa) R Moore	4	4
(United States) N Saviano	6	6

Quarterfinals
1	(United States) J McEnroe	6	6
(United States) N Saviano	1	4

==== Section 2 ====
First round
3	(United States) P Fleming	6	6
(Sweden) J Gunnarsson	3	4
(United States) G Malin	2	7	3
(United Kingdom) J Lloyd	6	5	6
(United States) B Manson	3	6	6
(United States) E Fromm	6	3	3
(Sweden) J Källqvist	2	2
13	(Czechoslovakia) T Šmíd	6	6
15	(India) V Amritraj	6	3	6
Q	(Sweden) T Svensson	1	6	3
(South Africa) D Schneider	4	2
(United States) A Pattison	6	6
(South Africa) K Curren	7	2	6
(Switzerland) H Günthardt	6	6	7
(Sweden) P Hjertquist	3	0
5	(Poland) W Fibak	6	6

Second round
3	(United States) P Fleming	6	6
(United Kingdom) J Lloyd	4	3
(United States) B Manson	4	4
13	(Czechoslovakia) T Šmíd	6	6
15	(India) V Amritraj	6	6
(United States) A Pattison	3	4
(Switzerland) H Günthardt	3	1
5	(Poland) W Fibak	6	6

Third round
3	(United States) P Fleming	6	3	6
13	(Czechoslovakia) T Šmíd	2	6	2
15	(India) V Amritraj	7	1	4
5	(Poland) W Fibak	6	6	6

Quarterfinals
3	(United States) P Fleming	2	5
5	(Poland) W Fibak	6	7

=== Bottom half ===
==== Section 3 ====
First round
6	(United States) Ti Gullikson	7	6
(Netherlands) T Okker	6	4
Q	(United States) F Taygan	6	6	3
(France) C Roger-Vasselin	4	7	6
Q	(Republic of Ireland) S Sorensen	7	6	4
(Israel) S Krulevitz	6	7	6
(United States) K Richardson	4	5
16	(United States) H Pfister	6	7
(New Zealand) O Parun	6	4
(United Kingdom) M Cox	7	6
(United States) T Gorman	6	6
(Finland) L Palin	3	0
(South Africa) F McMillan	6	3	2
(United States) S Stewart	4	6	6
(Italy) G Ocleppo	3	4
4	(United States) G Mayer	6	6

Second round
6	(United States) Ti Gullikson	6	6
(France) C Roger-Vasselin	2	0
(Israel) S Krulevitz	3	4
16	(United States) H Pfister	6	6
(United Kingdom) M Cox	6	7
(United States) T Gorman	4	5
(United States) S Stewart	4	3
4	(United States) G Mayer	6	6

Third round
6	(United States) Ti Gullikson	7	6
16	(United States) H Pfister	6	4
(United Kingdom) M Cox	4	4
4	(United States) G Mayer	6	6

Quarterfinals
6	(United States) Ti Gullikson	4	4
4	(United States) G Mayer	6	6

==== Section 4 ====
First round
7	(United States) B Gottfried	6	6	6
(France) G Moretton	7	3	4
(United States) V Van Patten	6	6
Q	(Sweden) T Högstedt	7	7
(United States) To Gullikson	6	6
(Spain) J Soler	3	2
Q	(West Germany) A Maurer	6	6
LL	(France) C Casa	2	2
14	(United States) M Riessen	6	4	6
(Sweden) B Andersson	2	6	0
(United States) T Waltke	6	4
(Sweden) J Norbäck	7	6
(United States) R Meyer	6	7
(France) B Fritz	1	5
(Sweden) S Svensson	0	5
2	(United States) H Solomon	6	7

Second round
7	(United States) B Gottfried	6	6
Q	(Sweden) T Högstedt	1	3
(United States) To Gullikson	6	6
Q	(West Germany) A Maurer	1	2
14	(United States) M Riessen	2	0
(Sweden) J Norbäck	6	6
(United States) R Meyer	4	4
2	(United States) H Solomon	6	6

Third round
7	(United States) B Gottfried	6	7
(United States) To Gullikson	3	5
(Sweden) J Norbäck	2	2
2	(United States) H Solomon	6	6

Quarterfinals
7	(United States) B Gottfried	7	6	7
2	(United States) H Solomon	5	7	6
