= 1979 Stockholm Open – Men's doubles =

Men's doubles
- 1979 Stockholm Open

Final
- Champions: (United States) Peter Fleming (United States) John McEnroe
- Runners-up: (Poland) Wojciech Fibak (Netherlands) Tom Okker
- Score: 6–4, 6–4

Events
Singles	men	women
Doubles	men	women
← 1978 ·	Stockholm Open	· 1980 →

Wojciech Fibak and Tom Okker were the defending champions, but lost in the final this year.

Peter Fleming and John McEnroe won the title, defeating Fibak and Okker 6–4, 6–4 in the final.

== Seeds ==
1. (United States) Peter Fleming / (United States) John McEnroe (champions)
2. (United States) Marty Riessen / (United States) Sherwood Stewart (first round)
3. (Poland) Wojciech Fibak / (Netherlands) Tom Okker (final)
4. (United States) Gene Mayer / (United States) Stan Smith (quarterfinals)
5. (South Africa) Bob Hewitt / (South Africa) Frew McMillan (semifinals)
6. (Switzerland) Heinz Günthardt / (Czechoslovakia) Tomáš Šmíd (first round)
7. (United States) Bruce Manson / (United States) Andrew Pattison (semifinals)
8. (United States) Tim Gullikson / (United States) Tom Gullikson (quarterfinals)

== Draw ==
=== Key ===
- Q = Qualifier
- WC = Wild card
- LL = Lucky loser
- Alt = Alternate
- ITF = ITF entry
- PR = Protected ranking
- SR = Special ranking
- SE = Special exempt
- JE = Junior exempt
- JR = Junior Accelerator Programme entrant
- CO = College Accelerator Programme entrant
- NG = Next Gen Accelerator Program entrant
- w/o = Walkover
- r = Retired
- d = Defaulted

=== Finals ===
Semifinals
1	(United States) Peter Fleming (United States) John McEnroe	6	4	7
5	(South Africa) Bob Hewitt (South Africa) Frew McMillan	1	6	5
3	(Poland) Wojciech Fibak (Netherlands) Tom Okker	6	6
7	(United States) Bruce Manson (United States) Andrew Pattison	4	3

Final
1	(United States) Peter Fleming (United States) John McEnroe	6	6
3	(Poland) Wojciech Fibak (Netherlands) Tom Okker	4	4

=== Top half ===
First round
1	(United States) P Fleming (United States) J McEnroe	6	7
(United States) S Carnahan (United States) T Delatte	1	6
(Sweden) ON Bengtson (Sweden) U Eriksson	7	6
(South Africa) R Moore (South Africa) D Schneider	5	2
(Sweden) B Andersson (Sweden) T Svensson	6	3
(Sweden) J Norbäck (Sweden) D Palm	7	6
(United States) B Gottfried (France) Y Noah	6	6	3
8	(United States) Ti Gullikson (United States) To Gullikson	7	2	6
4	(United States) G Mayer (United States) S Smith	6	6
(France) C Casa (Socialist Federal Republic of Yugoslavia) Z Ilin	2	2
(Spain) M Mir (Spain) R Vizcaino	3	3
(Australia) S Docherty (United States) F Taygan	6	6
(France) G Moretton (Italy) G Ocleppo	6	2
(Sweden) K Johansson (Finland) L Palin	7	6
(United States) G Malin (United States) V Van Patten	7	2	2
5	(South Africa) B Hewitt (South Africa) F McMillan	6	6	6

Second round
1	(United States) P Fleming (United States) J McEnroe	7	7
(Sweden) ON Bengtson (Sweden) U Eriksson	6	6
(Sweden) J Norbäck (Sweden) D Palm	4	6
8	(United States) Ti Gullikson (United States) To Gullikson	6	7
4	(United States) G Mayer (United States) S Smith	6	3	6
(Australia) S Docherty (United States) F Taygan	3	6	2
(Sweden) K Johansson (Finland) L Palin	3	2
5	(South Africa) B Hewitt (South Africa) F McMillan	6	6

Quarterfinals
1	(United States) P Fleming (United States) J McEnroe	7	6
8	(United States) Ti Gullikson (United States) To Gullikson	5	3
4	(United States) G Mayer (United States) S Smith	4	6	6
5	(South Africa) B Hewitt (South Africa) F McMillan	6	2	7

Semifinals
1	(United States) P Fleming (United States) J McEnroe	6	4	7
5	(South Africa) B Hewitt (South Africa) F McMillan	1	6	5

=== Bottom half ===
First round
6	(Switzerland) H Günthardt (Czechoslovakia) T Šmíd	5	5
(Sweden) P Hjertquist (Sweden) J Källqvist	7	7
(United States) C Leeds (Republic of Ireland) S Sorensen	6	6	6
(Sweden) J Gunnarsson (Sweden) S Svensson	4	7	7
(United Kingdom) J Lloyd (United Kingdom) T Lloyd	7	5	7
(India) V Amritraj (United States) H Pfister	6	7	5
(Sweden) P Larsson (Sweden) J Sjögren	1	4
3	(Poland) W Fibak (Netherlands) T Okker	6	6
7	(United States) B Manson (United States) A Pattison	6	6	6
(Venezuela) J Andrew (West Germany) A Maurer	4	7	3
(Israel) S Glickstein (Israel) S Krulevitz	4	6	1
(United States) F Buehning (South Africa) K Curren	6	3	6
(United States) E Fromm (United States) J Hayes	6	6	6
(United States) R Meyer (United States) K Richardson	3	7	3
(United States) G Hardie (United States) T Waltke	6	6	7
2	(United States) M Riessen (United States) S Stewart	7	4	6

Second round
(Sweden) P Hjertquist (Sweden) J Källqvist	6	7
(Sweden) J Gunnarsson (Sweden) S Svensson	3	6
(United Kingdom) J Lloyd (United Kingdom) T Lloyd	6	4
3	(Poland) W Fibak (Netherlands) T Okker	7	6
7	(United States) B Manson (United States) A Pattison	7	7
(United States) F Buehning (South Africa) K Curren	6	6
(United States) E Fromm (United States) J Hayes	6	6
(United States) G Hardie (United States) T Waltke	4	4

Quarterfinals
(Sweden) P Hjertquist (Sweden) J Källqvist	2	3
3	(Poland) W Fibak (Netherlands) T Okker	6	6
7	(United States) B Manson (United States) A Pattison	6	6
(United States) E Fromm (United States) J Hayes	2	3

Semifinals
3	(Poland) W Fibak (Netherlands) T Okker	6	6
7	(United States) B Manson (United States) A Pattison	4	3
