= 1978 Stockholm Open – Doubles =

Doubles
- 1978 Stockholm Open

Final
- Champions: (Poland) Wojtek Fibak (Netherlands) Tom Okker
- Runners-up: (United States) Bob Lutz (United States) Stan Smith
- Score: 6–3, 6–2

Events
| Singles | Doubles |
| ← 1977 · | Stockholm Open | · 1979 → |

Wojtek Fibak and Tom Okker were the defending champions.

Fibak and Okker successfully defended their title, defeating Bob Lutz and Stan Smith 6–3, 6–2 in the final.

== Seeds ==
1. (South Africa) Bob Hewitt / (South Africa) Frew McMillan (quarterfinals)
2. (Poland) Wojtek Fibak / (Netherlands) Tom Okker (champions)
3. (United States) Bob Lutz / (United States) Stan Smith (final)
4. (United States) Peter Fleming / (United States) John McEnroe (semifinals)
5. (Czechoslovakia) Jan Kodeš / (Czechoslovakia) Tomáš Šmíd (quarterfinals)
6. (United States) Arthur Ashe / (United States) Sandy Mayer (first round)
7. (United States) Dick Stockton / (United States) Erik van Dillen (second round)
8. (South Africa) Raymond Moore / (United States) Roscoe Tanner (second round)

== Draw ==
=== Key ===
- Q = Qualifier
- WC = Wild card
- LL = Lucky loser
- Alt = Alternate
- ITF = ITF entry
- PR = Protected ranking
- SR = Special ranking
- SE = Special exempt
- JE = Junior exempt
- JR = Junior Accelerator Programme entrant
- CO = College Accelerator Programme entrant
- NG = Next Gen Accelerator Program entrant
- w/o = Walkover
- r = Retired
- d = Defaulted

=== Finals ===
Semifinals
(United States) Bruce Manson (United States) Andrew Pattison | 6 | 6 | 3
3 | (United States) Robert Lutz (United States) Stan Smith | 7 | 4 | 6
4 | (United States) Peter Fleming (United States) John McEnroe | 6 | 6 | 4
2 | (Poland) Wojtek Fibak (Netherlands) Tom Okker | 7 | 2 | 6

Final
3 | (United States) Robert Lutz (United States) Stan Smith | 3 | 2
2 | (Poland) Wojtek Fibak (Netherlands) Tom Okker | 6 | 6

=== Top half ===
First round
1 | (South Africa) B Hewitt (South Africa) F McMillan | 6 | 6
(Sweden) P Hjertquist (Sweden) S Simonsson | 3 | 2
(United States) J Cohen (United States) Paul Fineman | 3 | 4
(United States) V Amaya (United States) T Waltke | 6 | 6
(United States) B Manson (United States) A Pattison | 6 | 6
(New Zealand) O Parun (France) C Roger-Vasselin | 0 | 2
(India) A Amritraj (India) V Amritraj | 2 | 1
7 | (United States) D Stockton (United States) E van Dillen | 6 | 6
3 | (United States) R Lutz (United States) S Smith | 6 | 6
(South Africa) J Kriek (West Germany) K Meiler | 1 | 3
(United States) E Fromm (United States) J Hayes | 2 | 6
(Sweden) ON Bengtson (Sweden) R Norberg | 6 | 7
(Switzerland) H Günthardt (Switzerland) M Günthardt | 6 | 4
(Romania) I Năstase (Italy) A Panatta | 7 | 6
(Sweden) T Larsen (Sweden) O Palmer | 1 | 3
5 | (Czechoslovakia) J Kodeš (Czechoslovakia) T Šmíd | 6 | 6

Second round
1 | (South Africa) B Hewitt (South Africa) F McMillan | w/o
(United States) V Amaya (United States) T Waltke
(United States) B Manson (United States) A Pattison | 7 | 2 | 6
7 | (United States) D Stockton (United States) E van Dillen | 6 | 6 | 3
3 | (United States) R Lutz (United States) S Smith | 6 | 6
(Sweden) ON Bengtson (Sweden) R Norberg | 1 | 3
(Romania) I Năstase (Italy) A Panatta | 6 | 2
5 | (Czechoslovakia) J Kodeš (Czechoslovakia) T Šmíd | 7 | 6

Quarterfinals
1 | (South Africa) B Hewitt (South Africa) F McMillan | 5 | 5
(United States) B Manson (United States) A Pattison | 7 | 7
3 | (United States) R Lutz (United States) S Smith | 6 | 6
5 | (Czechoslovakia) J Kodeš (Czechoslovakia) T Šmíd | 3 | 4

Semifinals
(United States) B Manson (United States) A Pattison | 6 | 6 | 3
3 | (United States) R Lutz (United States) S Smith | 7 | 4 | 6

=== Bottom half ===
First round
6 | (United States) A Ashe (United States) S Mayer | 3 | 3
(Sweden) B Andersson (Sweden) T Svensson | 6 | 6
(Spain) J García Requena (United States) R Reid | 3 | 4
(United States) Ti Gullikson (United States) To Gullikson | 6 | 6
(Czechoslovakia) J Hřebec (Czechoslovakia) V Zedník | 7 | 6
(Sweden) Per Larsson (Sweden) Björn Wahlström | 6 | 3
(United States) C Lewis (United States) Michael Greenberg | 0 | 3
4 | (United States) P Fleming (United States) J McEnroe | 6 | 6
8 | (South Africa) R Moore (United States) R Tanner | 6 | 7
(Czechoslovakia) J Granát (United States) P Pearson | 3 | 5
(United Kingdom) R Drysdale (Australia) J James | 6 | 6
(Sweden) J Norbäck (Sweden) D Palm | 3 | 4
(United States) T Garcia (United States) J Sadri | 6 | 6
(United States) J Austin (United States) G Hardie | 3 | 2
(Czechoslovakia) S Birner (Czechoslovakia) I Lendl | 0 | 2
2 | (Poland) W Fibak (Netherlands) T Okker | 6 | 6

Second round
(Sweden) B Andersson (Sweden) T Svensson | 3 | 6
(United States) Ti Gullikson (United States) To Gullikson | 6 | 7
(Czechoslovakia) J Hřebec (Czechoslovakia) V Zedník | 5 | 6
4 | (United States) P Fleming (United States) J McEnroe | 7 | 7
8 | (South Africa) R Moore (United States) R Tanner | 6 | 3 | 4
(United Kingdom) R Drysdale (Australia) J James | 1 | 6 | 6
(United States) T Garcia (United States) J Sadri | 3 | 4
2 | (Poland) W Fibak (Netherlands) T Okker | 6 | 6

Quarterfinals
(United States) Ti Gullikson (United States) To Gullikson | 4 | 2
4 | (United States) P Fleming (United States) J McEnroe | 6 | 6
(United Kingdom) R Drysdale (Australia) J James | 2 | 6
2 | (Poland) W Fibak (Netherlands) T Okker | 6 | 7

Semifinals
4 | (United States) P Fleming (United States) J McEnroe | 6 | 6 | 4
2 | (Poland) W Fibak (Netherlands) T Okker | 7 | 2 | 6
