= 1977 Stockholm Open – Doubles =

Doubles
- 1977 Stockholm Open

Final
- Champions: (Poland) Wojtek Fibak (Netherlands) Tom Okker
- Runners-up: (United States) Brian Gottfried (Mexico) Raúl Ramírez
- Score: 6–3, 6–3

Details
- Draw: 32
- Seeds: 2

Events
Singles	Doubles
- Stockholm Open

Bob Hewitt and Frew McMillan were the defending champions, but lost in the quarterfinals this year.

Wojtek Fibak and Tom Okker won the title, defeating Brian Gottfried and Raúl Ramírez 6–3, 6–3 in the final.

== Seeds ==
1. (South Africa) Bob Hewitt / (South Africa) Frew McMillan (quarterfinals)
2. (United States) Bob Lutz / (United States) Stan Smith (semifinals)

== Draw ==
Key

- Q = Qualifier
- WC = Wild card
- LL = Lucky loser
- Alt = Alternate
- ITF = ITF entry
- PR = Protected ranking
- SR = Special ranking
- SE = Special exempt
- JE = Junior exempt
- JR = Junior Accelerator Programme entrant
- CO = College Accelerator Programme entrant
- NG = Next Gen Accelerator Program entrant
- w/o = Walkover
- r = Retired
- d = Defaulted

=== Finals ===
Semifinals
(United States) Fred McNair (United States) Sherwood Stewart	0	6	6
(Poland) Wojtek Fibak (Netherlands) Tom Okker	6	4	7
(United States) Brian Gottfried (Mexico) Raúl Ramírez	6	7
2	(United States) Robert Lutz (United States) Stan Smith	2	6

Final
(Poland) Wojtek Fibak (Netherlands) Tom Okker	6	6
(United States) Brian Gottfried (Mexico) Raúl Ramírez	3	3

=== Top half ===
First round
1	(South Africa) B Hewitt (South Africa) F McMillan	6	6
(Czechoslovakia) J Kodeš (Czechoslovakia) T Šmíd	1	1
(Denmark) L Elvstrøm (Australia) B Phillips-Moore	6	4
(United States) K Richardson (South Africa) J Yuill	7	6
(Sweden) U Eriksson (Sweden) J Källqvist	6	2	2
(South Africa) R Moore (United States) A Pattison	3	6	6
(United States) E Friedler (United States) D Martin Jr.	2	2
(United States) F McNair (United States) S Stewart	6	6
(Poland) W Fibak (Netherlands) T Okker	6	1	6
(France) J-L Haillet (Sweden) K Johansson	4	6	4
(Sweden) Lars Samuelson (Sweden) Björn Wahlström	6	6
(United States) G Hardie (United States) T Waltke	2	3
(Czechoslovakia) J Granát (Czechoslovakia) P Hutka	2	6	6
(South Africa) B Bertram (South Africa) B Mitton	6	4	4
(United Kingdom) R Drysdale (Paraguay) F González	6	5
(India) A Amritraj (United Kingdom) R Taylor	7	7

Second round
1	(South Africa) B Hewitt (South Africa) F McMillan	6	6
(United States) K Richardson (South Africa) J Yuill	2	3
(South Africa) R Moore (United States) A Pattison	3	2
(United States) F McNair (United States) S Stewart	6	6
(Poland) W Fibak (Netherlands) T Okker	6	7
(Sweden) L Samuelson (Sweden) B Wahlström	2	5
(Czechoslovakia) J Granát (Czechoslovakia) P Hutka	2	6
(India) A Amritraj (United Kingdom) R Taylor	6	7

Quarterfinals
1	(South Africa) B Hewitt (South Africa) F McMillan	3	6
(United States) F McNair (United States) S Stewart	6	7
(Poland) W Fibak (Netherlands) T Okker	6	6
(India) A Amritraj (United Kingdom) R Taylor	2	3

Semifinals
(United States) F McNair (United States) S Stewart	0	6	6
(Poland) W Fibak (Netherlands) T Okker	6	4	7

=== Bottom half ===
First round
(United States) C Pasarell (United States) E van Dillen	6	6
(The Bahamas) J Antonas (United States) G Oropez	3	4
(Sweden) B Andersson (Sweden) T Svensson	3	7	7
(United States) R Fisher (United States) M Machette	6	6	5
(Sweden) ON Bengtson (Sweden) R Norberg	6	6
(United States) J Borowiak (United States) B Martin	4	3
(Switzerland) H Günthardt (United States) B Kleege	2	1
(United States) B Gottfried (Mexico) R Ramírez	6	6
(Czechoslovakia) F Pala (Hungary) B Taróczy	3	6	6
(United States) P Fleming (United States) B Teacher	6	1	4
(United States) Guy Fritz (Canada) H Fritz	6	6	3
(United Kingdom) J Feaver (Australia) J James	7	3	6
(Sweden) J Norbäck (Sweden) D Palm	4	3
(United States) H Hoyt (Australia) B Lloyd	6	6
(Sweden) T Larsen (Sweden) O Palmer	5	2
2	(United States) R Lutz (United States) S Smith	7	6

Second round
(United States) C Pasarell (United States) E van Dillen	6	2	3
(Sweden) B Andersson (Sweden) T Svensson	1	6	6
(Sweden) ON Bengtson (Sweden) R Norberg	7	1	3
(United States) B Gottfried (Mexico) R Ramírez	5	6	6
(Czechoslovakia) F Pala (Hungary) B Taróczy	5	3
(United Kingdom) J Feaver (Australia) J James	7	6
(United States) H Hoyt (Australia) B Lloyd	3	2
2	(United States) R Lutz (United States) S Smith	6	6

Quarterfinals
(Sweden) B Andersson (Sweden) T Svensson	2	1
(United States) B Gottfried (Mexico) R Ramírez	6	6
(United Kingdom) J Feaver (Australia) J James	4	4
2	(United States) R Lutz (United States) S Smith	6	6

Semifinals
(United States) B Gottfried (Mexico) R Ramírez	6	7
2	(United States) R Lutz (United States) S Smith	2	6
