= 1977 Fischer-Grand Prix – Doubles =

Doubles
- 1977 Fischer-Grand Prix

Final
- Champions: (South Africa) Bob Hewitt (South Africa) Frew McMillan
- Runners-up: (Poland) Wojciech Fibak (Czechoslovakia) Jan Kodeš
- Score: 6–4, 6–3

Details
- Draw: 16
- Seeds: 4

Events
Singles	Doubles
← 1976 ·	Vienna Open	· 1978 →

Bob Hewitt and Frew McMillan were the defending champions and won in the final 6–4, 6–3 against Wojciech Fibak and Jan Kodeš.

== Seeds ==
1. (South Africa) Bob Hewitt / (South Africa) Frew McMillan (champions)
2. (Poland) Wojciech Fibak / (Czechoslovakia) Jan Kodeš (final)
3. (United States) Brian Gottfried / (United States) Sandy Mayer (semifinals)
4. (Czechoslovakia) František Pala / (Hungary) Balázs Taróczy (semifinals)

== Draw ==
=== Key ===
- Q = Qualifier
- WC = Wild card
- LL = Lucky loser
- Alt = Alternate
- SE = Special exempt
- PR = Protected ranking
- ITF = ITF entry
- JE = Junior exempt
- w/o = Walkover
- r = Retired
- d = Defaulted
- SR = Special ranking

First round
1	(South Africa) B Hewitt (South Africa) F McMillan	6	6
(South Africa) B Bertram (South Africa) B Mitton	2	2
(United States) V Amaya (United States) E Friedler	2	1
(Sweden) O N Bengtson (Sweden) K Johansson	6	6
3	(United States) B Gottfried (United States) S Mayer	7	7
(Italy) C Barazzutti (Austria) P Feigl	6	5
(Czechoslovakia) J Granát (Socialist Federal Republic of Yugoslavia) N Špear	5	1
(Austria) H Kary (Czechoslovakia) T Šmíd	7	6
(Paraguay) F González (Paraguay) V Pecci	7	6
(The Bahamas) J Antonas (United States) G Oropez	6	2
(Czechoslovakia) J Šimbera (Sweden) T Svensson	2	2
4	(Czechoslovakia) F Pala (Hungary) B Taróczy	6	6
(United States) H Hoyt (Australia) B Lloyd	3	4
(Sweden) J Norbäck (Sweden) D Palm	6	6
(United States) K Richardson (South Africa) J Yuill	6	2	1
2	(Poland) W Fibak (Czechoslovakia) J Kodeš	4	6	6

Quarterfinals
1	(South Africa) B Hewitt (South Africa) F McMillan	6	6
(Sweden) O N Bengtson (Sweden) K Johansson	1	1
3	(United States) B Gottfried (United States) S Mayer	6	4	6
(Austria) H Kary (Czechoslovakia) T Šmíd	3	6	4
(Paraguay) F González (Paraguay) V Pecci	3	4
4	(Czechoslovakia) F Pala (Hungary) B Taróczy	6	6
(Sweden) J Norbäck (Sweden) D Palm	1	3
2	(Poland) W Fibak (Czechoslovakia) J Kodeš	6	6

Semifinals
1	(South Africa) B Hewitt (South Africa) F McMillan	6	6
3	(United States) B Gottfried (United States) S Mayer	3	4
4	(Czechoslovakia) F Pala (Hungary) B Taróczy	6	4	4
2	(Poland) W Fibak (Czechoslovakia) J Kodeš	4	6	6

Final
1	(South Africa) B Hewitt (South Africa) F McMillan	6	6
2	(Poland) W Fibak (Czechoslovakia) J Kodeš	4	3
