= 1980 Stockholm Open – Men's singles =

Men's singles
- 1980 Stockholm Open

Final
- Champion: (Sweden) Björn Borg
- Runner-up: (United States) John McEnroe
- Score: 6–3, 6–4

Details
- Draw: 32
- Seeds: 8

Events
Singles	men	women
Doubles	men	women
- Stockholm Open

Second-seeded John McEnroe was the defending champion, but lost in the final this year.

First-seeded Björn Borg won the title, defeating John McEnroe 6–3, 6–4 in the final.

== Seeds ==
1. (Sweden) Björn Borg (champion)
2. (United States) John McEnroe (final)
3. (United States) Gene Mayer (semifinals)
4. (United States) Harold Solomon (first round)
5. (United States) Brian Gottfried (second round)
6. (United States) Eliot Teltscher (second round)
7. (Poland) Wojtek Fibak (second round)
8. (United States) Victor Amaya (second round)

== Draw ==
Key

- Q = Qualifier
- WC = Wild card
- LL = Lucky loser
- Alt = Alternate
- ITF = ITF entry
- PR = Protected ranking
- SR = Special ranking
- SE = Special exempt
- JE = Junior exempt
- JR = Junior Accelerator Programme entrant
- CO = College Accelerator Programme entrant
- NG = Next Gen Accelerator Program entrant
- w/o = Walkover
- r = Retired
- d = Defaulted

=== Final ===
Final
1	(Sweden) Björn Borg	6	6
2	(United States) John McEnroe	3	4

=== Top half ===
First round
1	(Sweden) B Borg	6	6
(Czechoslovakia) T Šmíd	4	3
(Switzerland) H Günthardt	6	6
(United States) S Smith	4	1
(France) Y Noah	6	2	6
(Australia) P Kronk	4	6	1
(Australia) C Dibley	4	4
8	(United States) V Amaya	6	6
3	(United States) G Mayer	6	6
(United States) A Pattison	2	2
(United States) B Walts	6	4	6
(Sweden) S Simonsson	4	6	1
(Israel) S Glickstein	6	7
(South Africa) B Mitton	4	6
Q	(Sweden) M Wilander	7	5	1
5	(United States) B Gottfried	5	7	6

Second round
1	(Sweden) B Borg	6	6
(Switzerland) H Günthardt	2	3
(France) Y Noah	7	6
8	(United States) V Amaya	5	4
3	(United States) G Mayer	6	6
(United States) B Walts	2	1
(Israel) S Glickstein	6	3	6
5	(United States) B Gottfried	2	6	0

Quarterfinals
1	(Sweden) B Borg	2	6	6
(France) Y Noah	6	2	4
3	(United States) G Mayer	6	6
(Israel) S Glickstein	0	2

Semifinals
1	(Sweden) B Borg	6	7
3	(United States) G Mayer	2	5

=== Bottom half ===
First round
7	(Poland) W Fibak	6	6
(United States) S Mayer	4	2
(United States) R Lutz	6	6
(France) P Portes	3	1
Q	(Sweden) U Eriksson	6	5	6
Q	(Sweden) J Källqvist	4	7	4
(Sweden) P Hjertquist	6	6
4	(United States) H Solomon	2	1
6	(United States) E Teltscher	5	6	6
(Spain) Á Giménez	7	0	1
Q	(Sweden) H Simonsson	6	7
(United States) R Van't Hof	2	5
(Australia) P McNamee	3	6	6
(United States) H Pfister	6	2	4
(Hungary) B Taróczy	3	0
2	(United States) J McEnroe	6	6

Second round
7	(Poland) W Fibak	6	1	5
(United States) R Lutz	3	6	7
Q	(Sweden) U Eriksson	2	4
(Sweden) P Hjertquist	6	6
6	(United States) E Teltscher	2	2
Q	(Sweden) H Simonsson	6	6
(Australia) P McNamee	2	4
2	(United States) J McEnroe	6	6

Quarterfinals
(United States) R Lutz	6	6
(Sweden) P Hjertquist	3	3
Q	(Sweden) H Simonsson	5	3
2	(United States) J McEnroe	7	6

Semifinals
(United States) R Lutz	3	3
2	(United States) J McEnroe	6	6

== See also ==
- Borg–McEnroe rivalry
