= 1979 Stockholm Open =

- Date: 2–5 November (women's); 5–11 November (men's)
- Edition: 11th
- Surface: Hard / indoor
- Location: Stockholm, Sweden
- Venue: Kungliga tennishallen

Champions

Men's singles
- (United States) John McEnroe

Women's singles
- (United States) Billie Jean King

Men's doubles
- (United States) Peter Fleming / (United States) John McEnroe

Women's doubles
- (Netherlands) Betty Stöve / (Australia) Wendy Turnbull
← 1978 ·	Stockholm Open	· 1980 →

The 1979 Stockholm Open was a tennis tournament played on hard courts. The men's event was part of the 1979 Colgate-Palmolive Grand Prix, while the women's took part of the 1979 WTA Tour and took place at the Kungliga tennishallen in Stockholm, Sweden. The women's tournament was held from 2 November through 5 November 1979 while the men's tournament was held from 5 November through 11 November 1979.

== Finals ==
=== Men's singles ===
(United States) John McEnroe defeated (United States) Gene Mayer, 6–7, 6–3, 6–3

=== Women's singles ===
(United States) Billie Jean King defeated (Netherlands) Betty Stöve, 6–3, 6–7, 7–5

=== Men's doubles ===
(United States) Peter Fleming / (United States) John McEnroe defeated (Netherlands) Tom Okker / (Poland) Wojciech Fibak, 6–4, 6–4

=== Women's doubles ===
(Netherlands) Betty Stöve / (Australia) Wendy Turnbull defeated (United States) Billie Jean King / (South Africa) Ilana Kloss, 7–5, 7–6
