= Johan Sjögren =

Swedish tennis player

- Country (sports): Sweden
- Residence: Gothenburg, Sweden
- Born: 1963; Gothenburg, Sweden
- Plays: Right-handed (Unknown Backhand)

Singles
- Career record: 0–1 (Tour Level)
- Career titles: 0 ATP
- Highest ranking: No. 510 (4 January 1981)

Doubles
- Career record: 0–2 (Tour Level)
- Career titles: 0 ATP
- Highest ranking: No. 586 (4 January 1981)

Johan Sjögren (born in 1963) is a Swedish retired tennis player. He reached a career high ATP singles ranking of No. 510, which he achieved on 4 January 1981, and he achieved a career high ATP doubles ranking of No. 586, which he also achieved on 4 January 1981.

After a short unsuccessful professional career in which he played in the Swedish Open and Stockholm Open, Sjögren had a successful time at college in the USA where he became an All-American on four occasions for Southern Illinois University at Edwardsville.

== Career ==
In 1977, the 14-year-old Sjögren participated in the prestigious European Junior Championships, and won gold in both the singles and doubles tournaments, beating Christian Schultes in the final of the former. In the latter, he paired with fellow countryman Jörgen Windahl, and in the final, they beat Schultes and P. Ewaldsen of Germany. He thus became the very first player to win both the singles and doubles tournaments in the U14 events, a feat that has since been emulated by only 6 other players, including Novak Djokovic in 2001. As a junior, he also won the Swedish and Norwegian Championships and the Kalle Anka Cup twice, first in 1976 after beating Windahl in the final, and again in 1978, beating the future world No. 7 Joakim Nyström in the final, 4–6, 6–4, 6–2.

Shortly after he turned 16 in 1979, Sjögren started competing in the ITF Junior Circuit in the under-18 category, mainly as a doubles player. In his first tournament, the 1979 Stockholm Open, he paired with fellow countryman Per Larsson, and lost in the first round to eventual runners-up Wojciech Fibak and Tom Okker. At the 1980 Swedish Open, he paired with future world No. 1 Mats Wilander, but they lost in the first round again, this time to Ángel Giménez and Marcos Hocevar. Sjögren turned pro in 1980, but failed to reach a single final in the ATP tour.

In 1982, the 19-year-old Sjögren moved to Edwardsville, Illinois, in the United States, to continue his studies at the Southern Illinois University at Edwardsville, where he joined the men's tennis program of the SIU Edwardsville Cougars. Sjögren made the lineup as a freshman in the 1982–83 season and flourished, helping the team reach the national semi-finals of the NCAA Division II individual championships in both singles and doubles. As a sophomore during the 1983–84 season, Sjögren's role on the team grew. Once again, he helped the team reach the semi-finals in 1984. He then teamed with Dave Delsini to win the national doubles crown. It was the 8th consecutive year that SIU had won either a national singles or doubles crown. In his two seasons as a Cougar, Sjögren was a part of two national championship teams and earned four All-American certificates. The 1983 and 1984 SIU teams became the No. 6 and No. 7 national championships for the men's tennis program. He was inducted into the SIU's Hall of Fame in 2008.

== After retirement ==
Sjögren has a degree at the University of Gymnastics and Sports. For almost 30 years, he held various leadership and coaching positions within both the Swedish and Danish Tennis Associations and worked as a coach for the International Tennis Federation's Grand Slam Team. For several years, Sjögren worked at the Danish Tennis Association, among other things as sports director, and got to see Caroline Wozniacki's journey up close, which eventually led her to become world's No. 1.

As the Head of Sport for the Swedish Tennis Association, a position he held for 7 years between 2009 and 2016, Sjögren participated in a round table discussion on a coaching seminar during the 2014 ATP World Tour Finals event. The seminar was organized by the Swedish Tennis Association together with PTCA (Professional Tennis Coaches Association) and Kings of Tennis, and parents were one of the subjects that was discussed.

For five years between 2017 and 2022, Sjögren was the Regional Manager for the Swedish Tennis Association South (Tennis Syd). In January 2022, Båstad TS hired Sjögren as their new sports director, where he was tasked with the work of developing Båstad Sportcenter's facility. However, he then left Båstad TS after not even a year to start working at Tennis Syd again in the fall of 2023.

In July 2023, Tennis Syd had six players in the finals of the Next Generation Cup (former Donald Duck Cup), which Sjögren himself had won twice.
