= 1978 Stockholm Open =

- Date: 6–12 November
- Edition: 10th
- Category: Grand Prix circuit
- Draw: 64S / 32D
- Prize money: $175,000
- Surface: Hard / indoor
- Location: Stockholm, Sweden
- Venue: Kungliga tennishallen

Champions

Singles
- (United States) John McEnroe

Doubles
- (Poland) Wojciech Fibak / (Netherlands) Tom Okker
← 1977 ·	Stockholm Open	· 1979 →

The 1978 Stockholm Open was a men's tennis tournament played on hard courts and part of the 1978 Colgate-Palmolive Grand Prix and took place at the Kungliga tennishallen in Stockholm, Sweden. The tournament was held from 6 November through 12 November 1978. Third-seeded John McEnroe won the singles title.

== Finals ==
=== Singles ===
(United States) John McEnroe defeated (United States) Tim Gullikson, 6–2, 6–2

- It was McEnroe's 3rd singles title of the year and of his career.

=== Doubles ===
(Poland) Wojciech Fibak / (Netherlands) Tom Okker defeated (United States) Bob Lutz / (United States) Stan Smith, 6–3, 6–2
