= 1977 Stockholm Open =

- Date: 6–12 November
- Edition: 9th
- Category: Grand Prix
- Draw: 64S / 32D
- Prize money: $150,000
- Surface: Hard / indoor
- Location: Stockholm, Sweden
- Venue: Kungliga tennishallen

Champions

Singles
- (United States) Sandy Mayer

Doubles
- (Poland) Wojciech Fibak / (Netherlands) Tom Okker
← 1976 ·	Stockholm Open	· 1978 →

The 1977 Stockholm Open was a men's tennis tournament played on indoor hard courts and part of the 1977 Colgate-Palmolive Grand Prix and took place at the Kungliga tennishallen in Stockholm, Sweden. It was the ninth edition of the tournament and was held from 6 November through 12 November 1977. Sandy Mayer won the singles title.

== Finals ==
=== Singles ===
(United States) Sandy Mayer defeated (South Africa) Raymond Moore, 6–2, 6–4

- It was Mayer's 3rd singles title of the year and the 7th of his career.

=== Doubles ===
(Poland) Wojciech Fibak / (Netherlands) Tom Okker defeated (United States) Brian Gottfried / (Mexico) Raúl Ramírez, 6–3, 6–3
