= 1980 Stockholm Open – Men's doubles =

Men's doubles
- 1980 Stockholm Open

Final
- Champions: (Switzerland) Heinz Günthardt (Australia) Paul McNamee
- Runners-up: (United States) Bob Lutz (United States) Stan Smith
- Score: 6–7, 6–3, 6–2

Details
- Draw: 16
- Seeds: 4

Events
| Singles | men | women |
| Doubles | men | women |
- Stockholm Open

Peter Fleming and John McEnroe were the defending champions, but Fleming did not participate this year. McEnroe partnered Bill Maze, losing in the first round.

Heinz Günthardt and Paul McNamee won the title, defeating Bob Lutz and Stan Smith 6–7, 6–3, 6–2 in the final.

== Seeds ==
1. (United States) Bob Lutz / (United States) Stan Smith (final)
2. (United States) Gene Mayer / (United States) Sandy Mayer (first round)
3. (United States) Brian Gottfried / (South Africa) Frew McMillan (quarterfinals)
4. (Poland) Wojtek Fibak / (Hungary) Balázs Taróczy (quarterfinals)

== Draw ==
Key

- Q = Qualifier
- WC = Wild card
- LL = Lucky loser
- Alt = Alternate
- ITF = ITF entry
- PR = Protected ranking
- SR = Special ranking
- SE = Special exempt
- JE = Junior exempt
- JR = Junior Accelerator Programme entrant
- CO = College Accelerator Programme entrant
- NG = Next Gen Accelerator Program entrant
- w/o = Walkover
- r = Retired
- d = Defaulted

=== Draw ===
First round
1 | (United States) R Lutz (United States) S Smith | 2 | 6 | 6
(Australia) P Kronk (Czechoslovakia) T Šmíd | 6 | 3 | 2
(Sweden) H Simonsson (Sweden) S Simonsson | 6 | 6
(Australia) C Dibley (South Africa) B Mitton | 0 | 4
3 | (United States) B Gottfried (South Africa) F McMillan | 6 | 4 | 6
(United States) B Maze (United States) J McEnroe | 4 | 6 | 4
(South Africa) K Curren (United States) S Denton | 6 | 6
(Spain) Á Giménez (Sweden) P Hjertquist | 1 | 2
(Switzerland) H Günthardt (Australia) P McNamee | 6 | 6
(Sweden) J Gunnarsson (Sweden) S Svensson | 0 | 2
(United States) V Amaya (United States) H Pfister | 6 | 5
4 | (Poland) W Fibak (Hungary) B Taróczy | 7 | 7
(Finland) L Palin (United States) R Van't Hof | 7 | 6
(United States) B Martin (United States) E Teltscher | 6 | 2
(United States) A Pattison (United States) B Walts | 6 | 3 | 6
2 | (United States) G Mayer (United States) S Mayer | 2 | 6 | 3

Quarterfinals
1 | (United States) R Lutz (United States) S Smith | 6 | 6
(Sweden) H Simonsson (Sweden) S Simonsson | 4 | 3
3 | (United States) B Gottfried (South Africa) F McMillan | 7 | 2 | 1
(South Africa) K Curren (United States) S Denton | 5 | 6 | 6
(Switzerland) H Günthardt (Australia) P McNamee | 3 | 7 | 7
4 | (Poland) W Fibak (Hungary) B Taróczy | 6 | 5 | 5
(Finland) L Palin (United States) R Van't Hof | 4 | 7 | 6
(United States) A Pattison (United States) B Walts | 6 | 5 | 4

Semifinals
1 | (United States) R Lutz (United States) S Smith | 2 | 6 | 7
(South Africa) K Curren (United States) S Denton | 6 | 4 | 6
(Switzerland) H Günthardt (Australia) P McNamee | 6 | 6
(Finland) L Palin (United States) R Van't Hof | 3 | 2

Final
1 | (United States) R Lutz (United States) S Smith | 7 | 3 | 2
(Switzerland) H Günthardt (Australia) P McNamee | 6 | 6 | 6
