= 1977 Fischer-Grand Prix =

- Date: 24–30 October
- Edition: 3rd
- Category: Grand Prix
- Draw: 32S / 16D
- Prize money: $50,000
- Surface: Hard / indoor
- Location: Vienna, Austria
- Venue: Wiener Stadthalle

Champions

Singles
- (United States) Brian Gottfried

Doubles
- (South Africa) Bob Hewitt / (South Africa) Frew McMillan
- Vienna Open

The 1977 Fischer-Grand Prix was a men's tennis tournament played on indoor hard courts at the Wiener Stadthalle in Vienna, Austria that was part of the 1977 Colgate-Palmolive Grand Prix. It was the third edition of the tournament and was held from 24 October through 30 October 1977. First-seeded Brian Gottfried won the singles title.

== Finals ==
=== Singles ===
(United States) Brian Gottfried defeated (Poland) Wojciech Fibak 6–1, 6–1

- It was Gottfried's 5th singles title of the year and the 12th of his career.

=== Doubles ===
(South Africa) Bob Hewitt / (South Africa) Frew McMillan defeated (Poland) Wojciech Fibak / (Czechoslovakia) Jan Kodeš 6–4, 6–3

- It was Hewitt's 13th title of the year and the 43rd of his career. It was McMillan's 12th title of the year and the 48th of his career.
