= 1977 Fischer-Grand Prix – Singles =

Singles
- 1977 Fischer-Grand Prix

Final
- Champion: (United States) Brian Gottfried
- Runner-up: (Poland) Wojciech Fibak
- Score: 6–1, 6–1

Details
- Draw: 32
- Seeds: 8

Events
Singles	Doubles
← 1976 ·	Vienna Open	· 1978 →

Wojciech Fibak was the defending champion but lost in the final 6–1, 6–1 to Brian Gottfried.

== Seeds ==
1. (United States) Brian Gottfried (champion)
2. (Poland) Wojciech Fibak (final)
3. (United States) Sandy Mayer (semifinals)
4. (Italy) Corrado Barazzutti (second round)
5. (Hungary) Balázs Taróczy (quarterfinals)
6. (Czechoslovakia) Jan Kodeš (first round)
7. (Paraguay) Víctor Pecci (first round)
8. (South Africa) Bob Hewitt (quarterfinals)

== Draw ==
=== Key ===
- Q = Qualifier
- WC = Wild card
- LL = Lucky loser
- Alt = Alternate
- SE = Special exempt
- PR = Protected ranking
- ITF = ITF entry
- JE = Junior exempt
- w/o = Walkover
- r = Retired
- d = Defaulted
- SR = Special ranking

=== Finals ===
Semifinals
1	(United States) Brian Gottfried	6	3	6
3	(United States) Sandy Mayer	2	6	2
(Austria) Hans Kary	3	3
2	(Poland) Wojciech Fibak	6	6

Final
1	(United States) Brian Gottfried	6	6
2	(Poland) Wojciech Fibak	1	1

=== Top half ===
First round
1	(United States) B Gottfried	6	6
Q	(United States) G Amaya	3	1
(United States) H Hoyt	4	7	4
(South Africa) F McMillan	6	5	6
(United States) R Fagel	3	2
(Czechoslovakia) T Šmíd	6	6
(Sweden) K Johansson	5	7	6
7	(Paraguay) V Pecci	7	6	2
3	(United States) S Mayer	6	6
(Austria) P Feigl	3	2
Q	(South Africa) J Kriek	6	6
(Sweden) O N Bengtson	3	1
(United States) K Richardson	6	4	2
(United States) E Friedler	2	6	6
(Socialist Federal Republic of Yugoslavia) N Špear	3	1
5	(Hungary) B Taróczy	6	6

Second round
1	(United States) B Gottfried	6	6
(South Africa) F McMillan	1	2
(Czechoslovakia) T Šmíd	7	3	6
(Sweden) K Johansson	6	6	3
3	(United States) S Mayer	6	4	7
Q	(South Africa) J Kriek	0	6	5
(United States) E Friedler	4	1
5	(Hungary) B Taróczy	6	6

Quarterfinals
1	(United States) B Gottfried	6	6
(Czechoslovakia) T Šmíd	3	2
3	(United States) S Mayer	1	6	6
5	(Hungary) B Taróczy	6	2	4

Semifinals
1	(United States) B Gottfried	6	3	6
3	(United States) S Mayer	2	6	2

=== Bottom half ===
First round
6	(Czechoslovakia) J Kodeš	7	6	3
(South Africa) B Bertram	6	7	6
Q	(Czechoslovakia) F Pala	6	6
(Sweden) D Palm	3	2
(United States) V Amaya	3	0^{r}
(Austria) H Kary	6	1
(West Germany) R Gehring	1	6	2
4	(Italy) C Barazzutti	6	4	6
8	(South Africa) B Hewitt	3	6	6
(South Africa) B Mitton	6	1	4
(Czechoslovakia) J Granát	5	4
(Australia) B Lloyd	7	6
(South Africa) J Yuill	6	6
(Austria) H Stiegler	1	2
(Czechoslovakia) J Šimbera	2	1
2	(Poland) W Fibak	6	6

Second round
(South Africa) B Bertram	6	7
Q	(Czechoslovakia) F Pala	3	5
(Austria) H Kary	6	3	6
4	(Italy) C Barazzutti	3	6	3
8	(South Africa) B Hewitt	6	6
(Australia) B Lloyd	4	3
(South Africa) J Yuill	3	0
2	(Poland) W Fibak	6	6

Quarterfinals
(South Africa) B Bertram	3	6
(Austria) H Kary	6	7
8	(South Africa) B Hewitt	5	6	0
2	(Poland) W Fibak	7	3	6

Semifinals
(Austria) H Kary	3	3
2	(Poland) W Fibak	6	6
