= 1980 Stockholm Open =

- Date: 4–10 November (M); 27 October – 1 November (W)
- Edition: 12th
- Prize money: $200,000 (M) $75,000 (W)
- Surface: Hard / indoor
- Location: Stockholm, Sweden
- Venue: Kungliga tennishallen

Champions

Men's singles
- (Sweden) Björn Borg

Women's singles
- (Czechoslovakia) Hana Mandlíková

Men's doubles
- (Switzerland) Heinz Günthardt / (Australia) Paul McNamee

Women's doubles
- (Socialist Federal Republic of Yugoslavia) Mima Jaušovec / (Romania) Virginia Ruzici
- Stockholm Open

The 1980 Stockholm Open was a tennis tournament played on indoor hard courts. The men's event was part of the 1980 Volvo Grand Prix, while the women's was part of the 1980 WTA Tour and took place at the Kungliga tennishallen in Stockholm, Sweden. The women's tournament took part from 27 October through 1 November 1980 while the men's tournament was held from 4 November through 10 November 1980. Björn Borg and Hana Mandlíková won the singles titles.

== Finals ==
=== Men's singles ===
(Sweden) Björn Borg defeated (United States) John McEnroe, 6–3, 6–4

- It was Borg's 8th singles title of the year and the 60th of his career.

=== Women's singles ===
(Czechoslovakia) Hana Mandlíková defeated (West Germany) Bettina Bunge, 6–2, 6–2

=== Men's doubles ===
(Switzerland) Heinz Günthardt / (Australia) Paul McNamee defeated (United States) Bob Lutz / (United States) Stan Smith, 6–7, 6–3, 6–2

=== Women's doubles ===
(Socialist Federal Republic of Yugoslavia) Mima Jaušovec / (Romania) Virginia Ruzici defeated (Czechoslovakia) Hana Mandlíková / (Netherlands) Betty Stöve, 6–2, 6–1

== See also ==
- Borg–McEnroe rivalry
