= Jan Källqvist =

Swedish tennis player

- Country (sports): Sweden
- Residence: Stocksund, Stockholm, Sweden
- Born: 31 March 1958 (age 66)
- Plays: Right-handed

Singles
- Career record: 0–13
- Highest ranking: No. 177 (26 Dec 1979)

Doubles
- Career record: 3–11
- Highest ranking: No. 854 (3 Jan 1983)

Jan Rune Källqvist (born 31 March 1958) is a Swedish former tennis player who was active in the 1970s.

== Career ==
Källqvist played in his first Grand Prix event as a sixteen-year-old at the 1974 Stockholm Open. He lost in the first round to the Colombian, twelve years his senior, Iván Molina. In partnership with Ulf Eriksson he also competed in the doubles draw and lost in the first round. Källqvist participated in the singles draw at thirteen Grand Prix tournaments and lost in the first round on each occasion.

In doubles, during July 1979, he and partner Leo Palin reached the semifinals at the Porto Alegre Challenger in Brazil and in November 1979, with partner Per Hjertquist he reached the quarterfinals at the Stockholm Open, before losing to the eventual finalists Wojtek Fibak and Tom Okker.

Källqvist has a career high ATP singles ranking of No. 177 that he achieved on 26 December 1979.
