= Guillermo Oropez =

American tennis player

- Country (sports): United States
- Born: February 7, 1947 (age 79) Corpus Christi, Texas, U.S.

Singles
- Career record: 3–5
- Highest ranking: No. 222 (July 12, 1978)

Grand Slam singles results
- Wimbledon: Q1 (1975)

Doubles
- Career record: 2–14

Grand Slam doubles results
- US Open: 1R (1977, 1979, 1980)

Guillermo Oropez (born February 7, 1947) is an American former professional tennis player.

Oropez was born in Corpus Christi, Texas and is of Mexican descent. A late comer to tennis at the age of 16, he played collegiate tennis for both the University of New Mexico and University of Nevada. He also spent time in New Jersey as a tennis pro. Turning professional in 1973, Oropez featured in the doubles main draw of the US Open on three occasions, the first time at Forest Hills and other two after the tournament moved to Flushing Meadows.
