= Stockholm Open =

Coordinates: 59°21′01″N 18°05′43″E

ATP Tour
- Founded: 1969; 57 years ago
- Location: Stockholm; Sweden
- Venue: The Royal Tennis Hall
- Category: Grand Prix tennis circuit (1970–1989); Super 9 (1990–1994); ATP World Series / ATP International Series / ATP World Tour 250 series (1995-present)
- Surface: Hard (indoor) (1969–1979, 1981–1988, since 1995); Carpet (indoor) (1980, 1989–1994)
- Draw: 28S / 16Q / 16D
- Prize money: €706,850 (2025)
- Website: Website

Current champions (2026)
- Men's singles: (United States) Taylor Fritz
- Men's doubles: (Sweden) Erik Grevelius (Sweden) Adam Heinonen

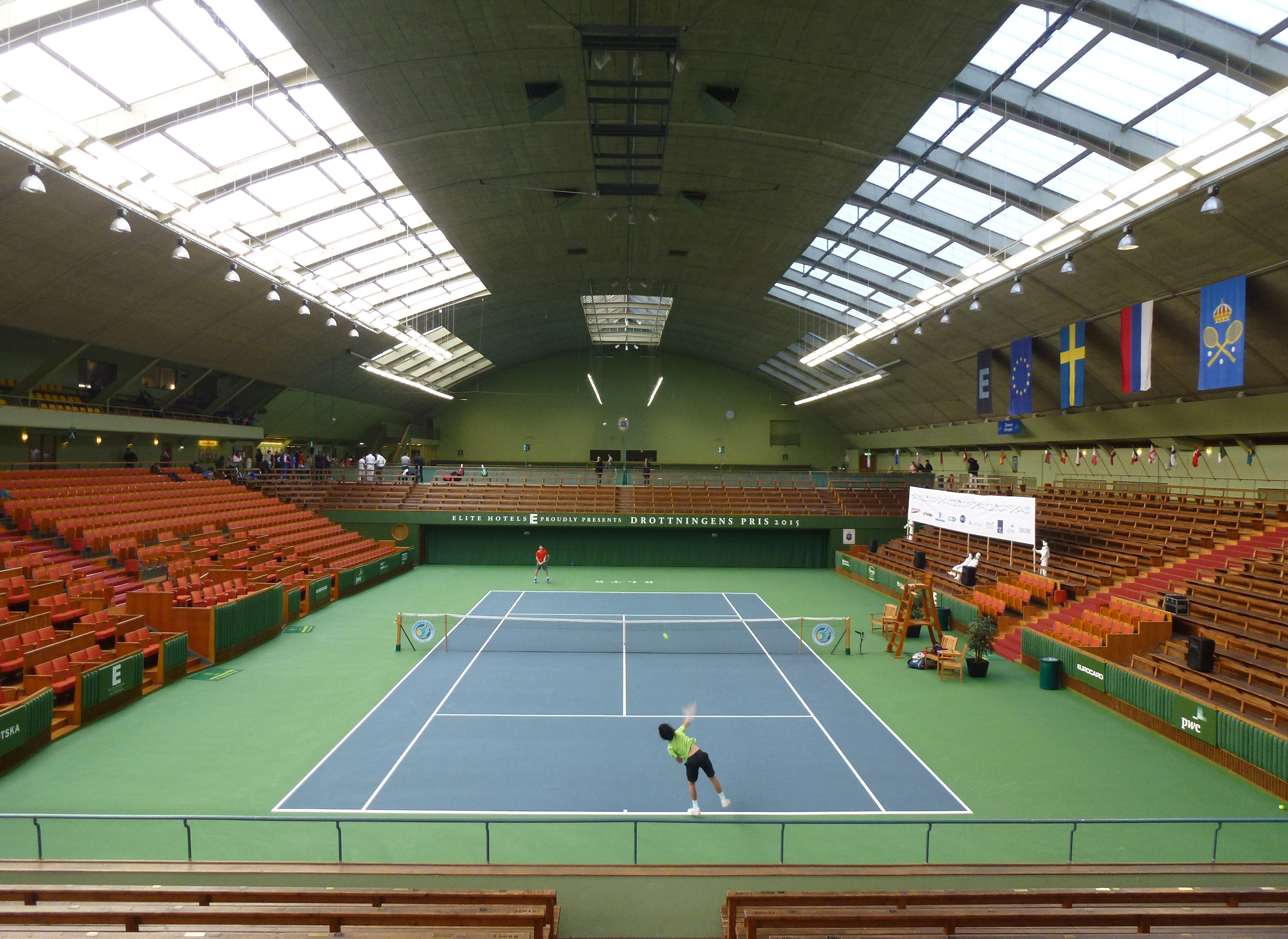
Kungliga Tennishallen

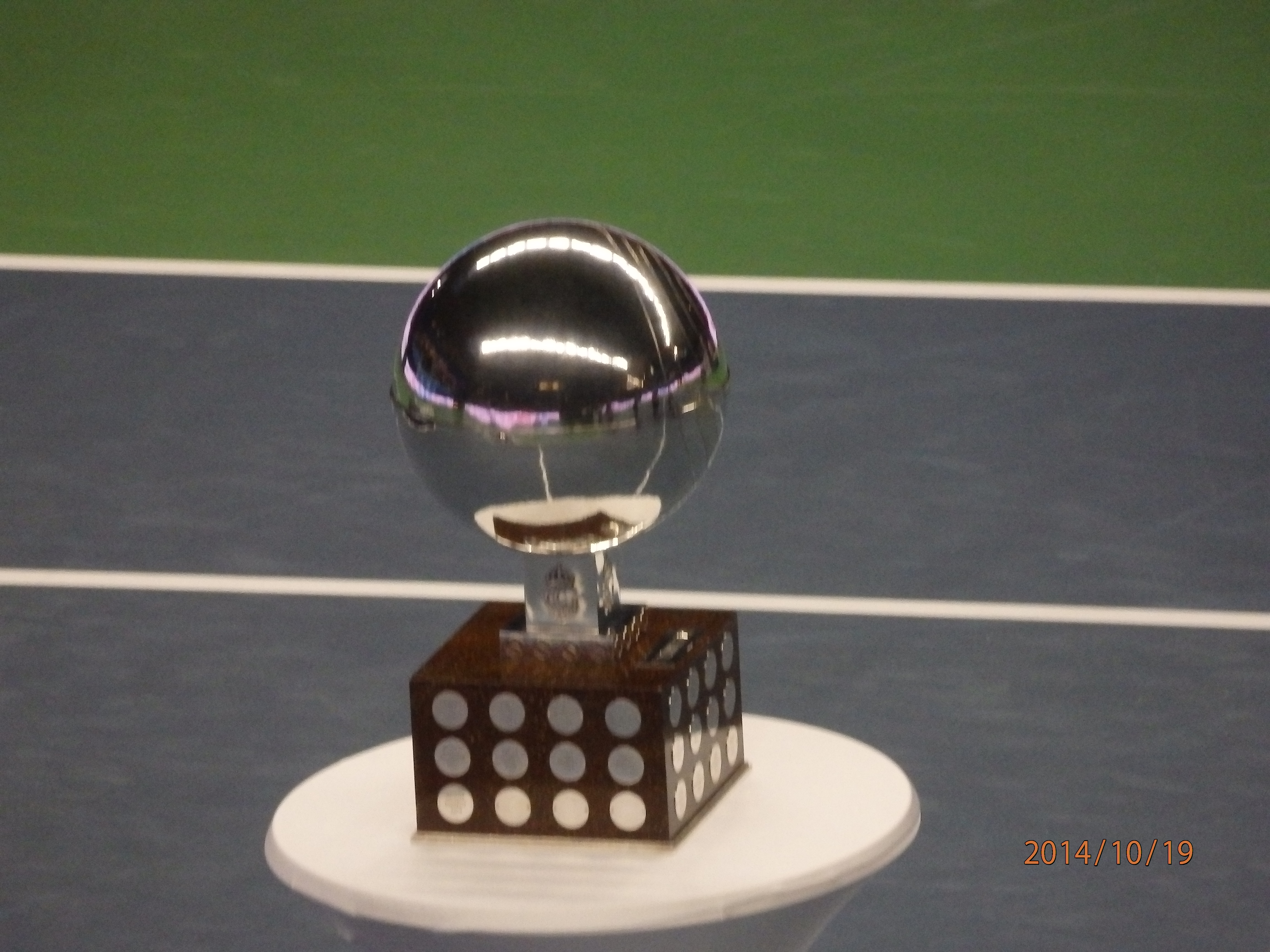
The singles trophy

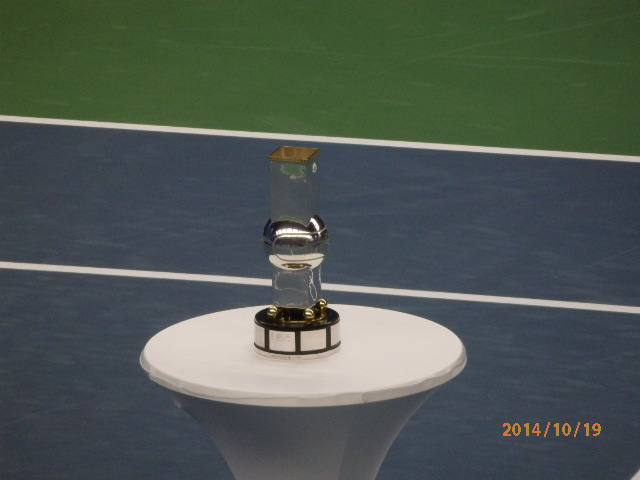
The doubles trophy

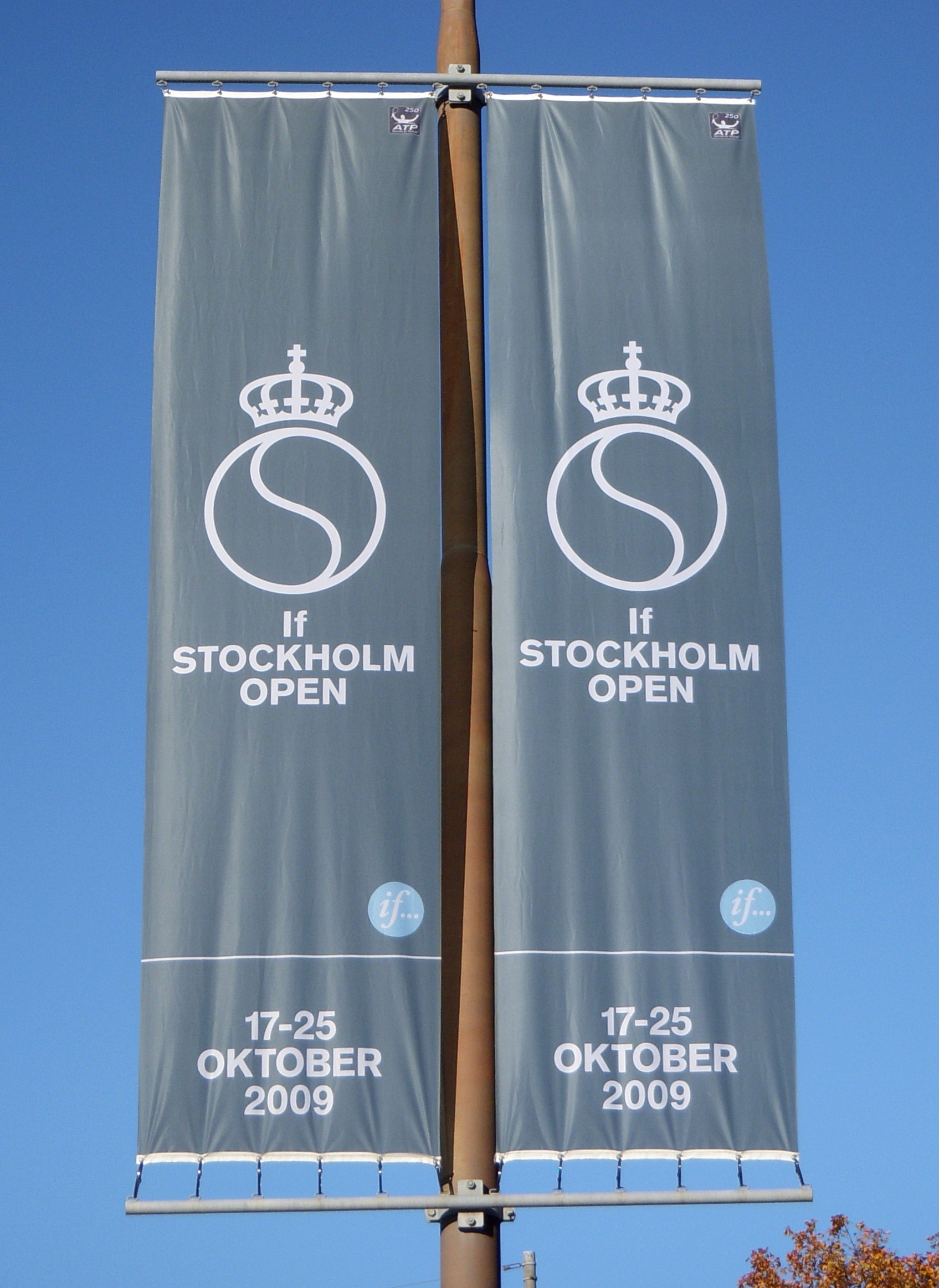
Stockholm Open 2009

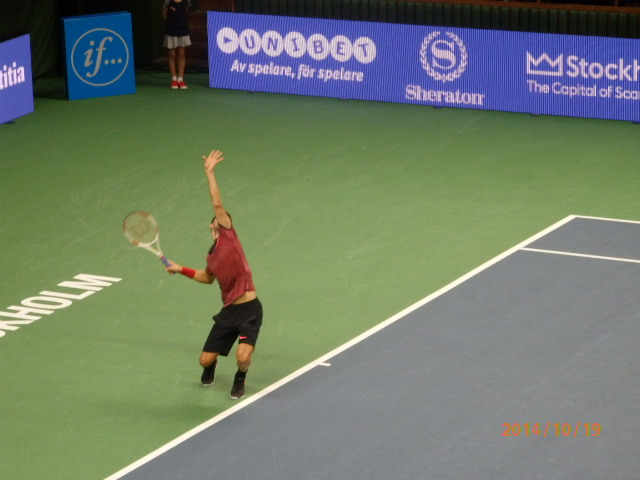
The 2013 winner Grigor Dimitrov playing in 2014

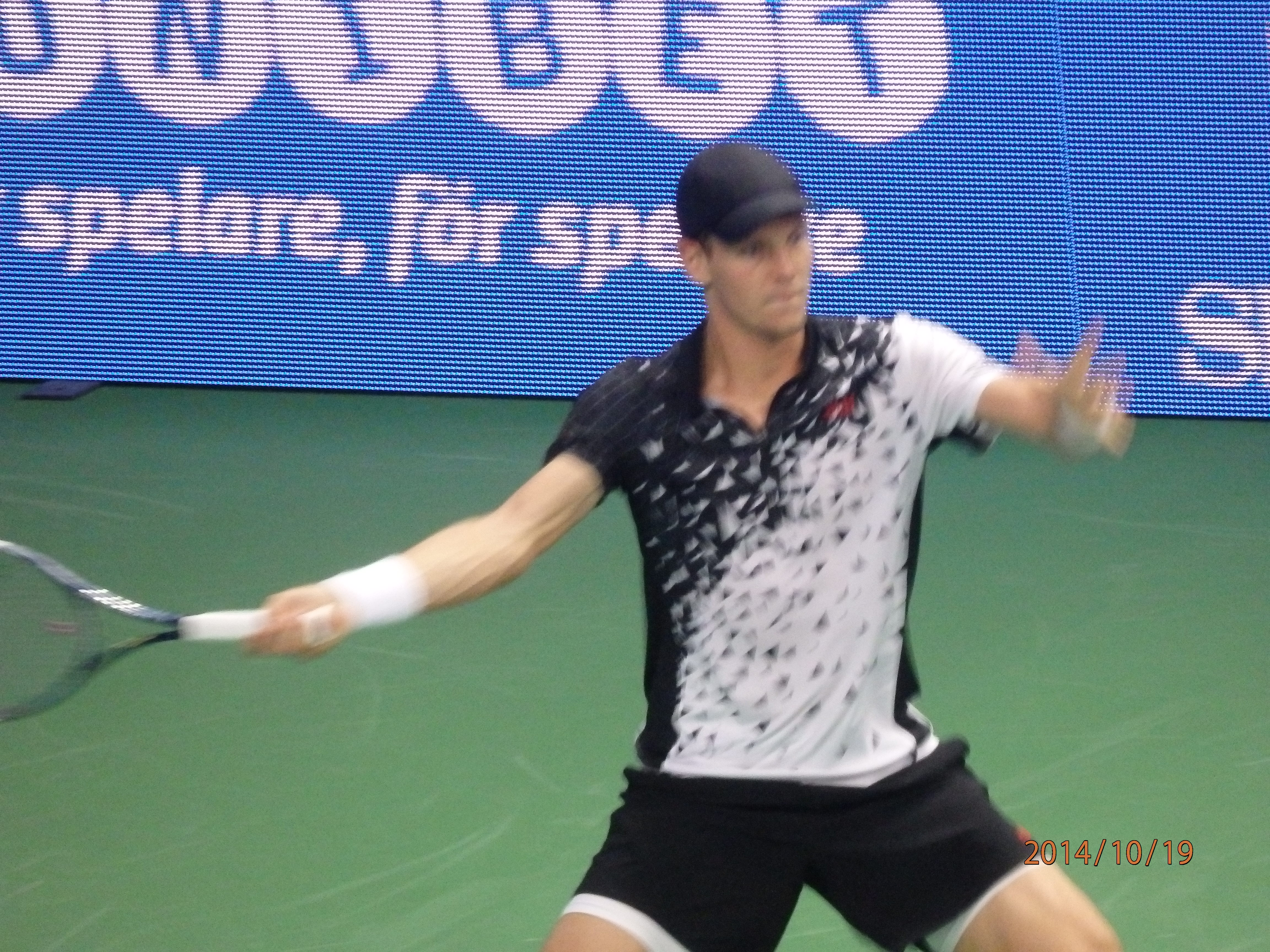
Three times winner Tomáš Berdych

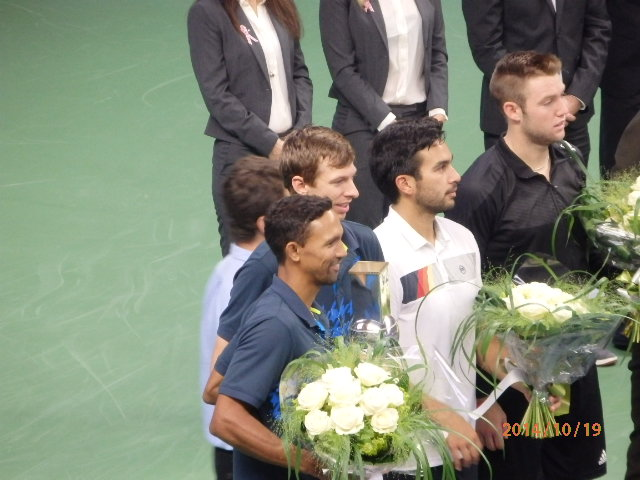
The doubles finalists in 2014

The Bybit Stockholm Open (currently sponsored by Bybit). It is an annual tennis ATP 250-level tournament held in Sweden since 1969. It is played on hardcourts at the Royal Tennis Hall. The event is the world’s oldest indoor ATP tournament and is also the only one played in an indoor arena purpose-built for tennis. It was held in November in 2026 but will return to its usual October time slot in 2027.

== History ==
The Stockholm Open was founded in 1969 at the initiative of former Swedish tennis star Sven Davidson. In 1969, 1975, 1979 and 1980, women's events in singles and doubles were also held in addition to the usual men's tournament. Between 1989 and 1994, the event was held in the Globe Arena.

In 2020, the event was canceled due to the Coronavirus pandemic, but resumed in 2021 and was held in November during that season.

From the 2023 edition until 2026, the tournament's official name was changed to the BNP Paribas Nordic Open after the global bank BNP Paribas joined as a title sponsor. It was held in October until 2026 when it was moved to November.

== Past finals ==
=== Men ===
==== Singles ====
Year	Champions	Runners-up	Score
1969	(Socialist Federal Republic of Yugoslavia) Nikola Pilić	(Romania) Ilie Năstase	6–4, 4–6, 6–2
↓ Grand Prix circuit ↓
1970	(United States) Stan Smith	(United States) Arthur Ashe	5–7, 6–4, 6–4
↓ WCT circuit ↓
1971	(United States) Arthur Ashe	(Czechoslovakia) Jan Kodeš	6–1, 3–6, 6–2, 1–6, 6–4
↓ Grand Prix circuit ↓
1972	(United States) Stan Smith (2)	(Netherlands) Tom Okker	6–4, 6–3
1973	(United States) Tom Gorman	(Sweden) Björn Borg	6–3, 4–6, 7–6^{(7–5)}
1974	(United States) Arthur Ashe (2)	(Netherlands) Tom Okker	6–2, 6–2
1975	(Italy) Adriano Panatta	(United States) Jimmy Connors	4–6, 6–3, 7–5
1976	(United Kingdom) Mark Cox	(Spain) Manuel Orantes	4–6, 7–5, 7–6^{(7–3)}
1977	(United States) Sandy Mayer	(South Africa) Raymond Moore	6–2, 6–4
1978	(United States) John McEnroe	(United States) Tim Gullikson	6–2, 6–2
1979	(United States) John McEnroe (2)	(United States) Gene Mayer	6–7, 6–3, 6–3
1980	(Sweden) Björn Borg	(United States) John McEnroe	6–3, 6–4
1981	(United States) Gene Mayer	(United States) Sandy Mayer	6–4, 6–2
1982	(France) Henri Leconte	(Sweden) Mats Wilander	7–6^{(7–4)}, 6–3
1983	(Sweden) Mats Wilander	(Czechoslovakia) Tomáš Šmíd	6–1, 7–5
1984	(United States) John McEnroe (3)	(Sweden) Mats Wilander	6–2, 3–6, 6–2
1985	(United States) John McEnroe (4)	(Sweden) Anders Järryd	6–1, 6–2
1986	(Sweden) Stefan Edberg	(Sweden) Mats Wilander	6–2, 6–1, 6–1
1987	(Sweden) Stefan Edberg (2)	(Sweden) Jonas Svensson	7–5, 6–2, 4–6, 6–4
1988	(West Germany) Boris Becker	(Sweden) Peter Lundgren	6–4, 6–1, 6–1
1989	(Czechoslovakia) Ivan Lendl	(Sweden) Magnus Gustafsson	7–5, 6–0, 6–3
↓ ATP Tour Masters 1000 (Note: Known as Championship Series, Single Week from 1990 till 1995.) ↓
1990	(West Germany) Boris Becker (2)	(Sweden) Stefan Edberg	6–4, 6–0, 6–3
1991	(Germany) Boris Becker (3)	(Sweden) Stefan Edberg	3–6, 6–4, 1–6, 6–2, 6–2
1992	(Croatia) Goran Ivanišević	(France) Guy Forget	7–6^{(7–2)}, 4–6, 7–6^{(7–5)}, 6–2
1993	(Germany) Michael Stich	(Croatia) Goran Ivanišević	4–6, 7–6^{(8–6)}, 7–6^{(7–3)}, 6–2
1994	(Germany) Boris Becker (4)	(Croatia) Goran Ivanišević	4–6, 6–4, 6–3, 7–6^{(7–4)}
↓ ATP Tour 250 (Note: Known as World Series from 1990 till 1999 and International Series from 2000 till 2008.) ↓
1995	(Sweden) Thomas Enqvist	(France) Arnaud Boetsch	7–5, 6–4
1996	(Sweden) Thomas Enqvist (2)	(United States) Todd Martin	7–5, 6–4, 7–6^{(7–0)}
1997	(Sweden) Jonas Björkman	(Netherlands) Jan Siemerink	3–6, 7–6^{(7–2)}, 6–2, 6–4
1998	(United States) Todd Martin	(Sweden) Thomas Johansson	6–3, 6–4, 6–4
1999	(Sweden) Thomas Enqvist (3)	(Sweden) Magnus Gustafsson	6–3, 6–4, 6–2
2000	(Sweden) Thomas Johansson	(Russia) Yevgeny Kafelnikov	6–2, 6–4, 6–4
2001	(Netherlands) Sjeng Schalken	(Finland) Jarkko Nieminen	3–6, 6–3, 6–3, 4–6, 6–3
2002	(Thailand) Paradorn Srichaphan	(Chile) Marcelo Ríos	6–7^{(2–7)}, 6–0, 6–3, 6–2
2003	(United States) Mardy Fish	(Sweden) Robin Söderling	7–5, 3–6, 7–6^{(7–4)}
2004	(Sweden) Thomas Johansson (2)	(United States) Andre Agassi	3–6, 6–3, 7–6^{(7–4)}
2005	(United States) James Blake	(Thailand) Paradorn Srichaphan	6–1, 7–6^{(8–6)}
2006	(United States) James Blake (2)	(Finland) Jarkko Nieminen	6–4, 6–2
2007	(Croatia) Ivo Karlović	(Sweden) Thomas Johansson	6–3, 3–6, 6–1
2008	(Argentina) David Nalbandian	(Sweden) Robin Söderling	6–2, 5–7, 6–3
2009	(Cyprus) Marcos Baghdatis	(Belgium) Olivier Rochus	6–1, 7–5
2010	(Switzerland) Roger Federer	(Germany) Florian Mayer	6–4, 6–3
2011	(France) Gaël Monfils	(Finland) Jarkko Nieminen	7–5, 3–6, 6–2
2012	(Czech Republic) Tomáš Berdych	(France) Jo-Wilfried Tsonga	4–6, 6–4, 6–4
2013	(Bulgaria) Grigor Dimitrov	(Spain) David Ferrer	2–6, 6–3, 6–4
2014	(Czech Republic) Tomáš Berdych (2)	(Bulgaria) Grigor Dimitrov	5–7, 6–4, 6–4
2015	(Czech Republic) Tomáš Berdych (3)	(United States) Jack Sock	7–6^{(7–1)}, 6–2
2016	(Argentina) Juan Martín del Potro	(United States) Jack Sock	7–5, 6–1
2017	(Argentina) Juan Martín del Potro (2)	(Bulgaria) Grigor Dimitrov	6–4, 6–2
2018	(Greece) Stefanos Tsitsipas	(Latvia) Ernests Gulbis	6–4, 6–4
2019	(Canada) Denis Shapovalov	(Serbia) Filip Krajinović	6–4, 6–4
2020	Cancelled because of the COVID-19 pandemic		
2021	(United States) Tommy Paul	(Canada) Denis Shapovalov	6–4, 2–6, 6–4
2022	(Denmark) Holger Rune	(Greece) Stefanos Tsitsipas	6–4, 6–4
2023	(France) Gaël Monfils (2)	Pavel Kotov	4–6, 7–6^{(8–6)}, 6–3
2024	(United States) Tommy Paul (2)	(Bulgaria) Grigor Dimitrov	6–4, 6–3
2025	(Norway) Casper Ruud	(France) Ugo Humbert	6–2, 6–3
2026	(United States) Taylor Fritz	(Argentina) Thiago Agustín Tirante	6–2, 4–6, 7–6^{(7–3)}

==== Doubles ====
Year	Champions	Runners-up	Score
1969	(Australia) Roy Emerson (Australia) Rod Laver	(Spain) Andrés Gimeno (United Kingdom) Graham Stilwell	6–4, 6–2
↓ Grand Prix circuit ↓
1970	(United States) Arthur Ashe (United States) Stan Smith	(Australia) Bob Carmichael (Australia) Owen Davidson	6–0, 5–7, 7–5
↓ WCT circuit ↓
1971	(United States) Stan Smith (2) (United States) Tom Gorman	(United States) Arthur Ashe (United States) Bob Lutz	6–3, 6–4
↓ Grand Prix circuit ↓
1972	(Netherlands) Tom Okker (United States) Marty Riessen	(Australia) Roy Emerson (Australia) Colin Dibley	7–5, 7–6
1973	(United States) Jimmy Connors (Romania) Ilie Năstase	(Australia) Bob Carmichael (South Africa) Frew McMillan	6–3, 6–7, 6–2
1974	(Netherlands) Tom Okker (2) (United States) Marty Riessen (2)	(South Africa) Bob Hewitt (South Africa) Frew McMillan	2–6, 6–3, 6–4
1975	(South Africa) Bob Hewitt (South Africa) Frew McMillan	(United States) Charlie Pasarell (United States) Roscoe Tanner	3–6, 6–3, 6–4
1976	(South Africa) Bob Hewitt (2) (South Africa) Frew McMillan (2)	(Netherlands) Tom Okker (United States) Marty Riessen	6–4, 4–6, 6–4
1977	(Netherlands) Tom Okker (3) (Poland) Wojciech Fibak	(United States) Brian Gottfried (Mexico) Raúl Ramírez	6–3, 6–3
1978	(Netherlands) Tom Okker (4) (Poland) Wojciech Fibak (2)	(United States) Stan Smith (United States) Bob Lutz	6–3, 6–2
1979	(United States) John McEnroe (United States) Peter Fleming	(Netherlands) Tom Okker (Poland) Wojciech Fibak	6–4, 6–4
1980	(Switzerland) Heinz Günthardt (Australia) Paul McNamee	(United States) Stan Smith (United States) Bob Lutz	6–7, 6–3, 6–2
1981	(South Africa) Kevin Curren (United States) Steve Denton	(United States) Sherwood Stewart (United States) Ferdi Taygan	6–7, 6–4, 6–0
1982	(Sweden) Jan Gunnarsson (United States) Mark Dickson	(United States) Sherwood Stewart (United States) Ferdi Taygan	7–6, 6–7, 6–4
1983	(Sweden) Anders Järryd (Sweden) Hans Simonsson	(United States) Johan Kriek (United States) Peter Fleming	6–3, 6–4
1984	(France) Henri Leconte (Czechoslovakia) Tomáš Šmíd	(India) Vijay Amritraj (Romania) Ilie Năstase	3–6, 7–6, 6–4
1985	(France) Guy Forget (Ecuador) Andrés Gómez	(United States) Mike De Palmer (United States) Gary Donnelly	6–3, 6–4
1986	(United States) Sherwood Stewart (Australia) Kim Warwick	(Australia) Pat Cash (Socialist Federal Republic of Yugoslavia) Slobodan Živojinović	6–4, 6–4
1987	(Sweden) Stefan Edberg (Sweden) Anders Järryd (2)	(United States) Jim Grabb (United States) Jim Pugh	6–3, 6–4
1988	(United States) Kevin Curren (2) (United States) Jim Grabb	(United States) Paul Annacone (Australia) John Fitzgerald	7–5, 6–4
1989	(Mexico) Jorge Lozano (United States) Todd Witsken	(United States) Rick Leach (United States) Jim Pugh	6–3, 5–7, 6–3
↓ ATP Tour Masters 1000 ↓
1990	(France) Guy Forget (Switzerland) Jakob Hlasek	(Australia) John Fitzgerald (Sweden) Anders Järryd	6–4, 6–2
1991	(Australia) John Fitzgerald (Sweden) Anders Järryd (3)	(Netherlands) Tom Nijssen (Czechoslovakia) Cyril Suk	7–5, 6–2
1992	(Australia) Todd Woodbridge (Australia) Mark Woodforde	(United States) Steve DeVries (Australia) David Macpherson	6–3, 6–4
1993	(Australia) Todd Woodbridge (2) (Australia) Mark Woodforde (2)	(South Africa) Gary Muller (South Africa) Danie Visser	6–1, 3–6, 6–2
1994	(Australia) Todd Woodbridge (3) (Australia) Mark Woodforde (3)	(Sweden) Jan Apell (Sweden) Jonas Björkman	6–3, 6–4
↓ ATP Tour 250 ↓
1995	(Netherlands) Jacco Eltingh (Netherlands) Paul Haarhuis	(Canada) Grant Connell (United States) Patrick Galbraith	3–6, 6–2, 7–6
1996	(United States) Patrick Galbraith (United States) Jonathan Stark	(United States) Todd Martin (United States) Chris Woodruff	7–6, 6–4
1997	(Germany) Marc-Kevin Goellner (United States) Richey Reneberg	(South Africa) Ellis Ferreira (United States) Patrick Galbraith	6–3, 3–6, 7–6
1998	(Sweden) Nicklas Kulti (Sweden) Mikael Tillström	(South Africa) Chris Haggard (Sweden) Peter Nyborg	7–5, 3–6, 7–5
1999	(South Africa) Piet Norval (Zimbabwe) Kevin Ullyett	(United States) Jan-Michael Gambill (United States) Scott Humphries	7–5, 6–3
2000	(The Bahamas) Mark Knowles (Canada) Daniel Nestor	(Czech Republic) Petr Pála (Czech Republic) Pavel Vízner	6–3, 6–2
2001	(United States) Donald Johnson (United States) Jared Palmer	(Sweden) Jonas Björkman (Australia) Todd Woodbridge	6–3, 4–6, 6–3
2002	(Zimbabwe) Wayne Black (Zimbabwe) Kevin Ullyett (2)	(Australia) Wayne Arthurs (Australia) Paul Hanley	6–4, 2–6, 7–6^{(7–4)}
2003	(Sweden) Jonas Björkman (Australia) Todd Woodbridge (4)	(Australia) Wayne Arthurs (Australia) Paul Hanley	6–3, 6–4
2004	(Spain) Fernando Verdasco (Spain) Feliciano López	(Australia) Wayne Arthurs (Australia) Paul Hanley	6–4, 6–4
2005	(Australia) Wayne Arthurs (Australia) Paul Hanley	(India) Leander Paes (Serbia and Montenegro) Nenad Zimonjić	5–3, 5–3
2006	(Australia) Paul Hanley (2) (Zimbabwe) Kevin Ullyett (3)	(Belgium) Olivier Rochus (Belgium) Kristof Vliegen	7–6^{(7–2)}, 6–4
2007	(Sweden) Jonas Björkman (2) (Belarus) Max Mirnyi	(France) Arnaud Clément (France) Michaël Llodra	6–4, 6–4
2008	(Sweden) Jonas Björkman (3) (Zimbabwe) Kevin Ullyett (4)	(Sweden) Johan Brunström (Sweden) Michael Ryderstedt	6–1, 6–3
2009	(Brazil) Bruno Soares (Zimbabwe) Kevin Ullyett (5)	(Sweden) Simon Aspelin (Australia) Paul Hanley	6–4, 7–6^{(7–4)}
2010	(United States) Eric Butorac (Curaçao) Jean-Julien Rojer	(Sweden) Johan Brunström (Finland) Jarkko Nieminen	6–3, 6–4
2011	(India) Rohan Bopanna (Pakistan) Aisam-ul-Haq Qureshi	(Brazil) Marcelo Melo (Brazil) Bruno Soares	6–1, 6–3
2012	(Brazil) Marcelo Melo (Brazil) Bruno Soares (2)	(Sweden) Robert Lindstedt (Serbia) Nenad Zimonjić	6–7^{(4–7)}, 7–5, [10–6]
2013	(Pakistan) Aisam-ul-Haq Qureshi (2) (Netherlands) Jean-Julien Rojer (2)	(Sweden) Jonas Björkman (Sweden) Robert Lindstedt	6–2, 6–2
2014	(United States) Eric Butorac (2) (South Africa) Raven Klaasen	(Philippines) Treat Huey (United States) Jack Sock	6–4, 6–3
2015	(United States) Nicholas Monroe (United States) Jack Sock	(Croatia) Mate Pavić (New Zealand) Michael Venus	7–5, 6–2
2016	(Sweden) Elias Ymer (Sweden) Mikael Ymer	(Croatia) Mate Pavić (New Zealand) Michael Venus	6–1, 6–1
2017	(Austria) Oliver Marach (Croatia) Mate Pavić	(Pakistan) Aisam-ul-Haq Qureshi (Netherlands) Jean-Julien Rojer	3−6, 7−6^{(8–6)}, [10−4]
2018	(United Kingdom) Luke Bambridge (United Kingdom) Jonny O'Mara	(New Zealand) Marcus Daniell (Netherlands) Wesley Koolhof	7–5, 7–6^{(10–8)}
2019	(Finland) Henri Kontinen (France) Édouard Roger-Vasselin	(Croatia) Mate Pavić (Brazil) Bruno Soares	6–4, 6–2
2020	Cancelled because of the COVID-19 pandemic		
2021	(Mexico) Santiago González (Argentina) Andrés Molteni	(Pakistan) Aisam-ul-Haq Qureshi (Netherlands) Jean-Julien Rojer	6–2, 6–2
2022	(El Salvador) Marcelo Arévalo (Netherlands) Jean-Julien Rojer (3)	(United Kingdom) Lloyd Glasspool (Finland) Harri Heliövaara	6–3, 6–3
2023	(Kazakhstan) Andrey Golubev (Ukraine) Denys Molchanov	(India) Yuki Bhambri (United Kingdom) Julian Cash	7–6^{(10–8)}, 6–2
2024	(Finland) Harri Heliövaara (United Kingdom) Henry Patten	(Czech Republic) Petr Nouza (Czech Republic) Patrik Rikl	7–5, 6–3
2025	(Austria) Alexander Erler (United States) Robert Galloway	(United States) Vasil Kirkov (Netherlands) Bart Stevens	6–3, 6–2
2026	(Sweden) Erik Grevelius (Sweden) Adam Heinonen	(Croatia) Nikola Mektić (Netherlands) Édouard Roger-Vasselin	6–3, 6–4

=== Women ===
==== Singles ====
Year	Champions	Runners-up	Score
1969	(United States) Billie Jean King	(United States) Julie Heldman	9–7, 6–2
1975	(United Kingdom) Virginia Wade	(France) Françoise Dürr	6–3, 4–6, 7–5
1976–78	Not held		
1979	(United States) Billie Jean King	(Netherlands) Betty Stöve	6–3, 6–7^{(4–7)}, 7–5
1980	(Czechoslovakia) Hana Mandlíková	(West Germany) Bettina Bunge	6–2, 6–2

==== Doubles ====
Year	Champions	Runners-up	Score
1975	(France) Françoise Dürr (Netherlands) Betty Stöve	(Australia) Evonne Goolagong Cawley (United Kingdom) Virginia Wade	6–3, 6–4
1976–78	Not held		
1979	(Netherlands) Betty Stöve (2) (Australia) Wendy Turnbull	(United States) Billie Jean King (South Africa) Ilana Kloss	7–5, 7–6
1980	(Socialist Federal Republic of Yugoslavia) Mima Jaušovec (Romania) Virginia Ruzici	(Czechoslovakia) Hana Mandlíková (Netherlands) Betty Stöve	6–2, 6–1
