= Ulf Eriksson (tennis) =

Swedish tennis player

- Country (sports): Sweden
- Plays: Right-handed

Singles
- Career record: 9–19
- Career titles: 0
- Highest ranking: No. 189 (26 Dec 1979)

Grand Slam singles results
- Australian Open: 1R (1976)
- Wimbledon: 1R (1979)

Doubles
- Career record: 3–10
- Career titles: 0

Grand Slam doubles results
- Australian Open: 1R (1976)

Ulf Eriksson is a former Swedish tennis player who was active in the 1970s.

== Career ==
=== Juniors ===
Eriksson participated in the 1975 Wimbledon boys' singles event, losing in the quarterfinals to the New Zealander, Chris Lewis. At the end of 1975, Eriksson was ranked no. 8 by the magazine, Tennis in its annual year–end rankings.

=== Pro tour ===
Eriksson made his debut in the main draw of a Grand Prix event at the 1974 Stockholm Open, losing in the first round to Bob Hewitt.

Eriksson played in the singles main draw of the 1976 Australian Open and in partnership with his compatriot, Olle Palmer in the doubles event, losing in the first round in both instances. He also qualified for the singles main draw of the 1979 Wimbledon Championships before losing to Marty Riessen. During August 1979 and in partnership with Per Hjertquist, Eriksson reached the doubles final at the Royan Challenger and then lost to Bob Carmichael and Victor Eke.

Eriksson has a career high ATP singles ranking of No. 189 that he achieved on 26 December 1979.
