= Douglas Palm =

Swedish tennis player

Douglas Boson Palm
- Full name: Douglas Boson Palm
- Country (sports): Sweden
- Born: 6 May 1951 (age 74) Flen
- Plays: Right-handed

Singles
- Career record: 19–45
- Career titles: 0
- Highest ranking: No. 101 ( oct 77 )

Grand Slam singles results
- Australian Open: 1R (1977)
- Wimbledon: 2R (1977)

Doubles
- Career record: 9–31
- Career titles: 0

Grand Slam doubles results
- French Open: 1R (1977)
- Wimbledon: 1R (1978)
- US Open: 1R (1977, 1978)

Douglas Boson Palm (born 6 May 1951) is a former professional tennis player from Sweden.

== Early life ==
Douglas Boson Palm was born on May 6, 1951 in Flen, Sweden. He grew up in Malmköping.

He is the third son of Bo Palm (who died 1973 of ALS) and his wife Ingrid Palm who died (aged 102) in 2021.

His brothers are Kjell Palm (died 2020) and Björn-Ulf Palm.

== Biography ==
Douglas Palm was a quarter-finalist at the Copenhagen Open in 1976. Later in the year he upset Mark Edmondson in the 1976 Swedish Open, then in the 1976 Stockholm Open held a match point in the second round against Mark Cox, who went on to win the tournament.

A Swedish Davis Cup representative, Palm was picked to play for his country in a tie against Monaco in Uppsala in April, 1977. He featured in the doubles rubber with Jan Norbäck, which they won over Bernard Balleret and Louis Borfiga, to secure the tie.

Palm made his first singles appearance in the main draw of a Grand Slam tournament at the 1977 Wimbledon Championships. He beat West German player Frank Gebert in the opening round, then lost a five set second round match to Paul Kronk.

After making a Grand Prix quarter-final, at Maui, Palm ended the 1977 season by competing in the December edition of the Australian Open (there had also been a tournament in January). On this occasion he was unable to get past the first round and lasted only one set against Alvin Gardiner before he had to retire hurt.

Palm returned to Wimbledon in 1978 and lost to Buster Mottram in opening round. The match was played before a large police presence due to demonstrators who had turned up to protest against Mottram's support of the National Front Party. He also competed in men's doubles at the French Open, Wimbledon and US Open during his career, all with Jan Norbäck.

His best performance in a Grand Prix tournament came at Linz in 1979, when he had wins over Patrice Dominguez, Markus Günthardt and Louk Sanders to make the semi-finals. That year he also won the men's doubles title with Tenny Svensson at the Scandinavian Indoor Championships, a tournament not part of the circuit.

== Personal life ==
Palm lived in Germany near Stuttgart for several decades. Following his playing career, he worked as a tennis coach with the Württembergischer Tennisbund (WTB), where he coached several young players who later pursued professional careers.

He was married to a German woman and has two children.

After his divorce in 2002 he lived with his longtime girlfriend in Nürtingen and Ludwigsburg near Stuttgart / Germany. In his 50s and 60s he was part of the „Herren 50“ tennis team in Nürtingen‘s tennis club ETV Nürtingen where he played against several other clubs in Baden-Württemberg.

Since 2007 Palm is back living in Sweden.

== See also ==
- List of Sweden Davis Cup team representatives
