= George Hardie (tennis) =

American tennis player

- Country (sports): United States
- Born: February 19, 1953 (age 72); Long Beach, California, U.S.
- Turned pro: 1975
- Plays: Left-handed

Singles
- Career record: 76-141
- Career titles: 0
- Highest ranking: No. 80 (January 30, 1978)

Grand Slam singles results
- Australian Open: 2R (1978)
- French Open: 2R (1978)
- Wimbledon: 1R (1978, 1980)
- US Open: 2R (1973)

Doubles
- Career record: 68-137
- Career titles: 1

Grand Slam doubles results
- Australian Open: 2R (1973, 1977, 1978)
- French Open: 1R (1976, 1978, 1980)
- Wimbledon: 2R (1976)
- US Open: 2R (1973, 1974, 1977)

George Hardie (born February 19, 1953) is a former professional tennis player from the United States.

== Tennis career ==
Hardie went to college at Southern Methodist University and was runner-up to Billy Martin in the 1975 NCAA Division One final. He had dropped just one game in winning the first two sets, but Billy Martin ultimately came back to win the match in five.

He later lost to Billy Martin again at the Arkansas International Tennis Tournament that year. It would remain the only final that he reached on the Grand Prix tennis circuit. He made semi-finals at Baltimore in 1978 (where he defeated Adriano Panatta) and Costa Rica in 1979. His quarter-final appearances included Stockholm in 1977, Guadalajara in 1978, Philadelphia in 1979 (where he had a win over Ilie Năstase), Palm Harbor in 1980 and San Juan in 1981.

Hardie appeared in the main singles draw of 16 Grand Slam tournaments over the course of his career and won three of his matches.

== Post-tennis ==
Hardie settled in Dallas, Texas and founded and ran multiple wind development companies.

Early Wind Development:

1991 – George founded his first wind company, International Wind Companies (which would ultimately become today's EDP Renewables). In 1998, the company was sold to the Zilkha family where George remained the CEO for almost four years. Later, Goldman Sachs bought Zilkha renewables (2005) which was then sold to EDP in 2007.

2003 – After his departure as CEO from Zilkha renewables, George founded G3 Energy. In 2005 G3 Energy was acquired by Babcock and Brown. While at Babcock and Brown, George developed the famous George Hardie renewable cash flow model which was instrumental in large-scale renewable energy developments.

Pattern Energy Career:

2009 – In 2009, Riverstone Holdings acquired Babcock and Brown's North American wind energy group and its development pipeline and was renamed Pattern Energy Group LP. George stayed on and became the VP of North American Business Development.

2019 – After a decade with Pattern, George transitioned to VP of Business Development to be more project-specific focused for senior leadership, and was instrumental in the development of the Green Fuels group.

2023 – After nearly 30 years in the wind industry, George retired from Pattern, but was retained as an advisor to support ongoing work.

== Grand Prix/WCT career finals ==
=== Singles: 1 (0–1) ===
Result	W/L	Date	Tournament	Surface	Opponent	Score
Loss	0–1	Feb 1975	Little Rock, United States	Carpet	(United States) Billy Martin	2–6, 6–7

=== Doubles: 2 (1–1) ===
Result	W/L	Date	Tournament	Surface	Partner	Opponents	Score
Win	1–0	Mar 1978	Lagos, Nigeria	Clay	(India) Sashi Menon	(Switzerland) Colin Dowdeswell (West Germany) Jürgen Fassbender	6–3, 3–6, 7–5
Loss	1–1	Mar 1978	Cairo, Egypt	Clay	(Argentina) Lito Álvarez	(Egypt) Ismail El Shafei (New Zealand) Brian Fairlie	3–6, 5–7, 2–6

== Challenger titles ==
=== Doubles: (1) ===
No.	Year	Tournament	Surface	Partner	Opponents	Score
1.	1981	San Luis Potosi, Mexico	Clay	(Australia) Brad Drewett	(United States) Rich Andrews (United States) Kevin Cook	5–7, 6–3, 7–6
