= Jan Norbäck =

Swedish tennis player

- Full name: Jan Norbäck
- Country (sports): Sweden
- Born: 6 March 1956 (age 69); Hudiksvall, Sweden
- Plays: Left-handed

Singles
- Career record: 36–76
- Career titles: 1
- Highest ranking: No. 84 (20 July 1981)

Grand Slam singles results
- Australian Open: 2R (1977)
- French Open: 3R (1981)
- Wimbledon: 2R (1977, 1979)
- US Open: 2R (1979)

Doubles
- Career record: 26–64
- Career titles: 0

Grand Slam doubles results
- French Open: 1R (1977)
- Wimbledon: 1R (1978)
- US Open: 1R (1977, 1978, 1979, 1980)

Jan Norbäck (born 6 March 1956) is a Swedish former professional tennis player.

== Biography ==
Born in Hudiksvall, Norbäck was based out of Torshälla.

Norbäck played three Davis Cup matches for Sweden, all in the 1977 tournament, the first a win in a doubles rubber against Monaco with Douglas Palm early in the campaign. His other two matches came in Sweden's Europe Zone A semi-final against Italy in Båstad. The youngest player in either team, Norbäck partnered with Rolf Norberg in the doubles, with Sweden needing a win over the Italian pairing of Paolo Bertolucci and Adriano Panatta to keep the tie alive. They were unable to, losing in four sets. In the reverse singles, Norbäck replaced Rolf Norberg for a dead rubber against Antonio Zugarelli and was able to secure a consolation win for the Swedes.

His only title on the Grand Prix circuit came at Zürich in 1977. He did not drop a set all tournament, with wins over Georges Goven, Lajos Levai, Juan Ignacio Muntañola, Nicola Spear, then in the final Jacek Niedźwiedzki.

Norbäck lost a match at the 1979 U.S. Pro Tennis Championships in unusual circumstances after he was defaulted for turning up late. Due to meet Manuel Orantes in the second round, he had spent the day with friends in New Hampshire, as a conversation with the referee-in-chief had left him under the impression his match was to be played late in the evening. When he arrived in Boston for his match he was informed Orantes had been awarded the win as he was over 30 minutes late, well above the 15-minute time limit allowance.

He made main draw appearances in all four Grand Slam events and his best performance was at the 1981 French Open when he made the third round.

== Grand Prix career finals ==
=== Singles: 1 (1–0) ===
Result	W/L	Date	Tournament	Surface	Opponent	Score
Win	1–0	Jan 1977	Zürich, Switzerland	Hard	(Poland) Jacek Niedźwiedzki	7–5, 6–2

== See also ==
- List of Sweden Davis Cup team representatives
