= Tenny Svensson =

Swedish tennis player

- Full name: Tenny Svensson
- Country (sports): Sweden
- Born: 21 September 1952 (age 72); Enslöv, Sweden
- Plays: Right-handed

Singles
- Career record: 34–84
- Career titles: 0
- Highest ranking: No. 117 (15 Oct 1973)

Grand Slam singles results
- French Open: 1R (1974, 1975, 1979)
- Wimbledon: 2R (1973, 1975)
- US Open: 1R (1975)

Doubles
- Career record: 32–75
- Career titles: 0

Grand Slam doubles results
- French Open: 2R (1976, 1977)
- Wimbledon: 2R (1973)
- US Open: QF (1975)

Tenny Svensson (born 21 September 1952) is a former professional tennis player from Sweden.

== Biography ==
Svensson played a 77-game opening round match against American John Andrews at the 1975 Wimbledon Championships, which he won 18–16 in the fifth set. The match went for 3 hours and 50 minutes. In his next match, against Onny Parun, he had to retire hurt in the second set. He made the quarter-finals in the men's doubles at the 1975 US Open, with Armistead Neely. Also in 1975, Svensson had a win over Björn Borg in a WCT tournament in Stockholm.

In the 1978 Davis Cup competition he represented the Sweden team in three ties. This included the Europe Zone final against Hungary, which Sweden won.

He won the Scandinavian Indoor Championships in 1979.

Now he works in a tennis hall, called SALK-hallen, and is a coach.

== See also ==
- List of Sweden Davis Cup team representatives
