= Per Hjertquist =

Swedish tennis player

- Country (sports): Sweden
- Born: 6 April 1960 (age 66) Bodafors, Sweden
- Height: 1.83 m (6 ft 0 in)

Singles
- Career record: 59–73
- Career titles: 1
- Highest ranking: No. 68 (22 December 1980)

Grand Slam singles results
- French Open: 3R (1981)
- Wimbledon: 1R (1980, 1983)
- US Open: 1R (1981, 1982)

Doubles
- Career record: 54–85
- Career titles: 1
- Highest ranking: No. 106 (25 August 1985)

Grand Slam doubles results
- French Open: 3R (1981)
- Wimbledon: 1R (1986)
- US Open: 1R (1981, 1982, 1985)

Per Hjertquist (born 6 April 1960) is a former professional tennis player from Sweden. During his career he won one main tour singles title the Sofia Grand Prix, and 4 satellite titles, and one main tour doubles title. He achieved a career-high singles ranking of world No. 68 in 1980 and a career-high doubles ranking of world No. 106 in 1985. As a junior, he was ranked 2nd after Ivan Lendl, and in 1978, became the US Open boys' singles champion.

== Career finals ==
=== Singles (1 title, 2 runners-up) ===
Result	W/L	Date	Tournament	Surface	Opponent	Score
Loss	0–1	Oct 1979	Tel Aviv, Israel	Hard	(Netherlands) Tom Okker	4–6, 3–6
Win	1–1	Dec 1980	Sofia, Bulgaria	Carpet	(Soviet Union) Vadim Borisov	6–3, 6–2, 7–5
Loss	1–2	Oct 1981	Tel Aviv, Israel	Hard	(United States) Mel Purcell	1–6, 1–6

=== Doubles (1 title) ===
Result	W/L	Date	Tournament	Surface	Partner	Opponents	Score
Win	1–0	Oct 1980	Tel Aviv, Israel	Hard	(United States) Steve Krulevitz	(United States) Eric Fromm (United States) Cary Leeds	7–6, 6–3
