= Wojciech Fibak =

Polish tennis player (born 1952)

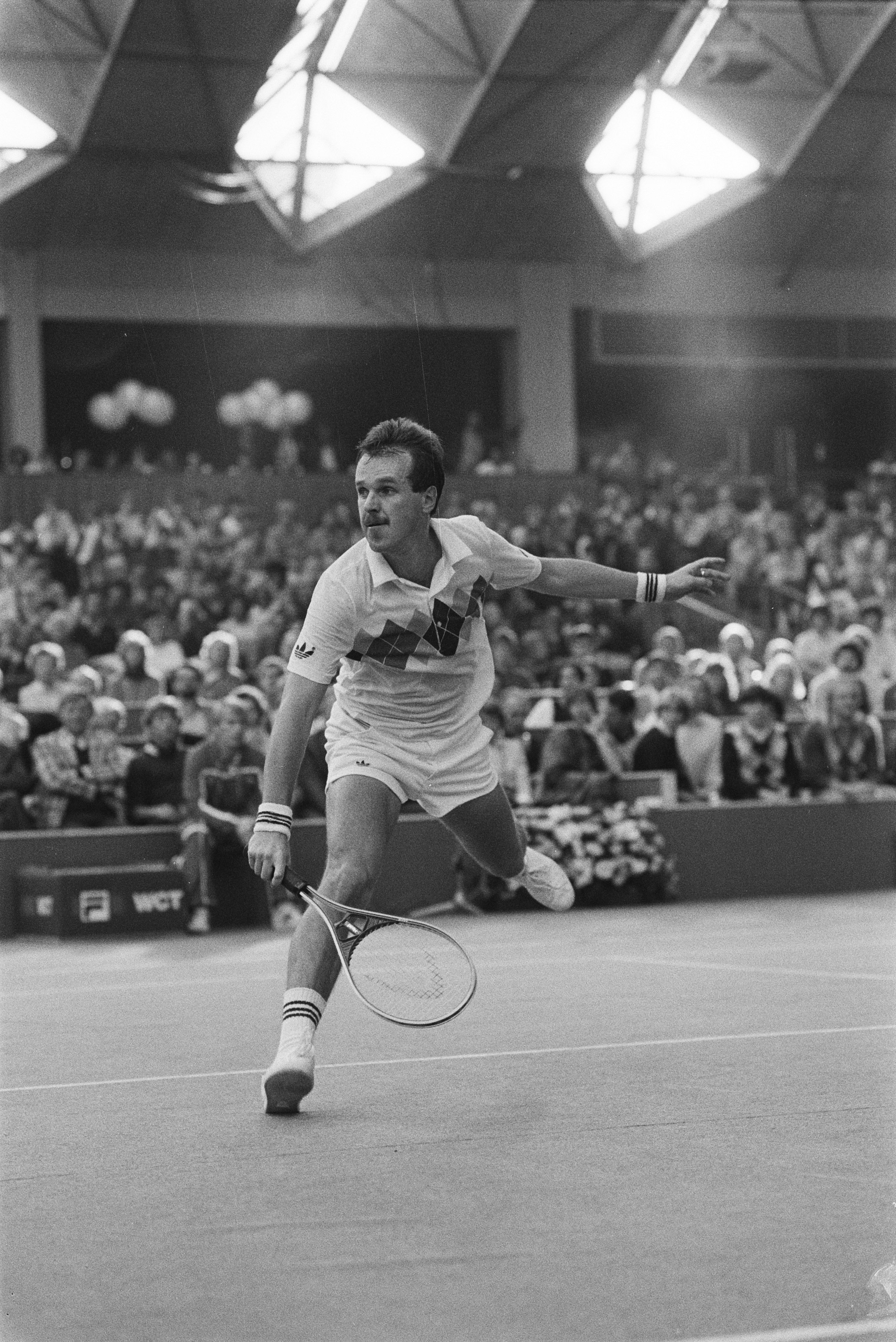
- Wojciech Fibak in 1982
- ITF name: Wojtek Fibak
- Country (sports): Poland
- Residence: Poznań, Poland
- Born: 30 August 1952 (age 74) Poznań, Poland
- Height: 1.82 m (6 ft 0 in)
- Plays: Right-handed (one-handed backhand)
- Prize money: $2,725,403

Singles
- Career record: 536–314
- Career titles: 15
- Highest ranking: No. 10 (25 July 1977)

Grand Slam singles results
- Australian Open: 3R (1978)
- French Open: QF (1977, 1980)
- Wimbledon: QF (1980)
- US Open: QF (1980)

Other tournaments
- Tour Finals: F (1976)
- WCT Finals: F (1982)

Doubles
- Career record: 527–248
- Career titles: 52
- Highest ranking: No. 2 (5 February 1979)

Grand Slam doubles results
- Australian Open: W (1978)
- French Open: F (1977)
- Wimbledon: SF (1978)
- US Open: SF (1978)

Other doubles tournaments
- WCT Finals: W (1976, 1978)

Wojciech Fibak (Polish pronunciation: [ˈvɔjt͡ɕɛx ˈfibak]; popularly Wojtek Fibak [ˈvɔjtɛk -]; born 30 August 1952) is a Polish former professional tennis player, entrepreneur, and art collector. Fibak is best known for his doubles success with Dutch pro Tom Okker and Australian Kim Warwick, although he also reached the Top 10 in singles.

Throughout his career, he won 15 ATP career singles titles as well as 52 ATP doubles titles including one Grand Slam title, the 1978 Australian Open. He was also the runner-up at the 1976 ATP Finals in singles.

== Biography and personal life ==
Born in Poznań, Poland, he won his first tournament in 1976, and between then and 1982 won 15 singles titles and 52 doubles titles. His best year was arguably 1980, when he reached the quarter-finals at the French Open, the US Open and Wimbledon Championships. Fibak's career singles win–loss record was 520–310, and he reached his career-high singles ranking of World No. 10 on 25 July 1977. His highest doubles ranking was World No. 2, which he reached in February 1979. He was consistently ranked in the top 20 in singles, and earned $2,725,403 in career prize money.

The highlight of his career was winning the Australian Open men's doubles in 1978 with Kim Warwick. They beat Paul Kronk and Cliff Letcher in two sets to take the title.

In 1983 he was banned from his local Poznań tennis club and faced reduced involvement from the Polish Tennis Federation and Davis Cup national team for his opposition to the communist PZPR government.

In 1985, Fibak founded the Polish Tennis Club (Polish Tennis Association of Southern California); in the 1990s he was head of the Polish Tennis Federation and widely credited with popularising the sport in his native country. After the fall of communism in the early 1990s his company Fibak Press acquired the regional former PZPR mouthpiece Gazeta Poznańska, until it was acquired by rivals Głos Wielkopolski in 2006, and published several other newspapers and magazines as well as being involved in books related to tennis.

He is also a businessman and an avid art collector, and used his tennis fortune to open the art gallery Galeria Fibak in 2001.

Fibak divides his time between Warsaw and Monaco, where he was Poland's honorary consul. He is a self-declared local patriot and was close to fellow local billionaire Jan Kulczyk.

He has three daughters: Agnieszka, Paulina, and Nina.

== Grand Slam finals ==
=== Doubles: 2 (1 title, 1 runner-up) ===
Result	Year	Championship	Surface	Partner	Opponents	Score
Loss	1977	French Open	Clay	(Czechoslovakia) Jan Kodeš	(United States) Brian Gottfried (Mexico) Raúl Ramírez	6–7, 6–4, 3–6, 4–6
Win	1978	Australian Open	Grass	(Australia) Kim Warwick	(Australia) Paul Kronk (Australia) Cliff Letcher	7–6, 7–5

== Career finals ==
=== Singles: 34 (15 titles / 19 runners-up) ===
Result	W-L	Date	Tournament	Surface	Opponent	Score
Loss	0–1	Mar 1975	Shreveport, US	Carpet	(Spain) Juan Gisbert Sr.	3–6, 7–5, 1–6
Loss	0–2	Apr 1976	Monte Carlo WCT, Monaco	Clay	(Argentina) Guillermo Vilas	1–6, 1–6, 4–6
Win	1–2	Apr 1976	Stockholm WCT, Sweden	Carpet	(Romania) Ilie Năstase	6–4, 7–6
Win	2–2	May 1976	Bournemouth, UK	Clay	(Spain) Manuel Orantes	6–2, 7–9, 6–2, 6–2
Loss	2–3	Aug 1976	Louisville, US	Clay	(United States) Harold Solomon	2–6, 5–7
Loss	2–4	Aug 1976	Indianapolis, US	Clay	(United States) Jimmy Connors	2–6, 4–6
Loss	2–5	Aug 1976	Toronto, Canada	Hard	(Argentina) Guillermo Vilas	4–6, 6–7, 2–6
Win	3–5	Oct 1976	Vienna, Austria	Hard (i)	(Mexico) Raúl Ramírez	6–7, 6–3, 6–4, 2–6, 6–1
Loss	3–6	Dec 1976	Masters, Houston	Carpet	(Spain) Manuel Orantes	7–5, 2–6, 6–0, 6–7, 1–6
Loss	3–7	Feb 1977	Mexico City WCT, Mexico	Hard	(Romania) Ilie Năstase	6–4, 2–6, 6–7
Win	4–7	Mar 1977	Monterrey WCT, Mexico	Carpet	(United States) Vitas Gerulaitis	6–4, 6–3
Loss	4–8	Apr 1977	Buenos Aires, Argentina	Clay	(Argentina) Guillermo Vilas	4–6, 3–6, 0–6
Win	5–8	May 1977	Düsseldorf, Germany	Clay	(South Africa) Raymond Moore	6–1, 5–7, 6–2
Loss	5–9	Oct 1977	Vienna, Austria	Hard (i)	(United States) Brian Gottfried	1–6, 1–6
Loss	5–10	Nov 1977	Cologne, Germany	Carpet	(Sweden) Björn Borg	6–2, 5–7, 3–6
Loss	5–11	May 1978	Hamburg, Germany	Clay	(Argentina) Guillermo Vilas	2–6, 4–6, 2–6
Win	6–11	Nov 1978	Cologne, Germany	Hard (i)	(India) Vijay Amritraj	6–2, 0–1, RET.
Win	7–11	Feb 1979	Denver, US	Carpet	(United States) Victor Amaya	6–4, 6–1
Win	8–11	Apr 1979	Stuttgart Indoor, Germany	Hard (i)	(Argentina) Guillermo Vilas	6–2, 6–2, 3–6, 6–2
Loss	8–12	May 1979	Munich, Germany	Clay	(Spain) Manuel Orantes	3–6, 2–6, 4–6
Loss	8–13	Oct 1979	Vienna, Austria	Hard (i)	(United States) Stan Smith	4–6, 0–6, 2–6
Loss	8–14	Nov 1979	Cologne, Germany	Hard (i)	(United States) Gene Mayer	3–6, 6–3, 1–6
Win	9–14	Mar 1980	Dayton, US	Carpet	(United States) Bruce Manson	7–6, 6–3
Win	10–14	Apr 1980	New Orleans, US	Carpet	(United States) Eliot Teltscher	6–4, 7–5
Win	11–14	Apr 1980	São Paulo, Brazil	Carpet	(United States) Vincent Van Patten	6–0, 7–6
Loss	11–15	Mar 1980	Stuttgart, Germany	Clay	(United States) Vitas Gerulaitis	2–6, 5–7, 2–6
Loss	11–16	Feb 1981	Philadelphia, US	Carpet	(United States) Roscoe Tanner	2–6, 6–7, 5–7
Win	12–16	Jul 1981	Gstaad, Switzerland	Clay	(France) Yannick Noah	6–1, 7–6
Loss	12–17	Oct 1982	Naples Finals WCT, Italy	Carpet	(Czechoslovakia) Ivan Lendl	4–6, 2–6, 1–6
Win	13–17	Oct 1982	Amsterdam WCT, Netherlands	Carpet	(South Africa) Kevin Curren	7–5, 3–6, 6–4, 6–3
Win	14–17	Nov 1982	Paris Indoor, France	Hard (i)	(United States) Bill Scanlon	6–2, 6–2, 6–2
Loss	14–18	Nov 1982	Dortmund, Germany	Carpet	(United States) Brian Teacher	7–6, 4–6, 4–6, 6–2, 4–6
Win	15–18	Dec 1982	Chicago-2 WCT, US	Carpet	(United States) Bill Scanlon	6–2, 2–6, 6–3, 6–4
Loss	15–19	Oct 1983	Basel, Switzerland	Hard (i)	(United States) Vitas Gerulaitis	6–4, 1–6, 5–7, 5–5, RET.

=== Doubles: 85 (51 titles / 34 runners-up) ===
Result	W-L	Date	Tournament	Surface	Partner	Opponents	Score
Win	1–0	May 1975	Munich, Germany	Clay	(Czechoslovakia) Jan Kodeš	(Czechoslovakia) Milan Holeček (West Germany) Karl Meiler	7–5, 6–3
Loss	1–1	May 1975	Hamburg, Germany	Clay	(Czechoslovakia) Jan Kodeš	(Spain) Juan Gisbert Sr. (Spain) Manuel Orantes	3–6, 6–7
Win	2–1	Jul 1975	Hilversum, Netherlands	Clay	(Argentina) Guillermo Vilas	(Socialist Federal Republic of Yugoslavia) Željko Franulović (United Kingdom) John Lloyd	6–4, 6–3
Loss	2–2	Aug 1975	Indianapolis, US	Clay	(West Germany) Hans-Jürgen Pohmann	(Spain) Juan Gisbert Sr. (Spain) Manuel Orantes	5–7, 0–6
—	2–3	Aug 1975	Louisville, US	Clay	(Argentina) Guillermo Vilas	(India) Vijay Amritraj (India) Anand Amritraj	NP
Loss	2–4	Oct 1975	Barcelona, Spain	Clay	(West Germany) Karl Meiler	(Sweden) Björn Borg (Argentina) Guillermo Vilas	6–3, 4–6, 3–6
Win	3–4	Nov 1975	Paris Indoor, France	Hard (i)	(West Germany) Karl Meiler	(Romania) Ilie Năstase (Netherlands) Tom Okker	6–4, 7–6
Win	4–4	Nov 1975	London, England	Carpet	(West Germany) Karl Meiler	(United States) Jimmy Connors (Romania) Ilie Năstase	6–1, 7–5
Loss	4–5	Jan 1976	Atlanta WCT, US	Carpet	(West Germany) Karl Meiler	(Australia) John Alexander (Australia) Phil Dent	3–6, 4–6
Loss	4–6	Feb 1976	Barcelona WCT, Spain	Clay	(West Germany) Karl Meiler	(United States) Robert Lutz (United States) Stan Smith	3–6, 3–6
Win	5–6	Apr 1976	Barcelona, Spain	Clay	(Poland) Jacek Niedźwiedzki	(Rhodesia) Colin Dowdeswell (Australia) Paul Kronk	6–2, 6–3
Loss	5–7	Apr 1976	Nice, France	Clay	(West Germany) Karl Meiler	(France) Patrice Dominguez (France) François Jauffret	4–6, 6–3, 3–6
Win	6–7	Apr 1976	Monte Carlo WCT, Monaco	Clay	(West Germany) Karl Meiler	(Sweden) Björn Borg (Argentina) Guillermo Vilas	7–6, 6–1
Win	7–7	May 1976	World Doubles WCT, US	Carpet	(West Germany) Karl Meiler	(United States) Robert Lutz (United States) Stan Smith	6–3, 2–6, 3–6, 6–3, 6–4
Win	8–7	May 1976	Bournemouth, England	Clay	(United States) Fred McNair	(Spain) Juan Gisbert Sr. (Spain) Manuel Orantes	4–6, 7–5, 7–5
Win	9–7	May 1976	Düsseldorf, Germany	Clay	(West Germany) Karl Meiler	(Australia) Bob Carmichael (South Africa) Raymond Moore	6–4, 4–6, 6–4
Loss	9–8	Jul 1976	Båstad, Sweden	Clay	(Spain) Juan Gisbert Sr.	(United States) Fred McNair (United States) Sherwood Stewart	3–6, 4–6
Loss	9–9	Jul 1976	Hilversum, Netherlands	Clay	(Hungary) Balázs Taróczy	(Argentina) Ricardo Cano (Chile) Belus Prajoux	4–6, 3–6
Win	10–9	Oct 1976	Tehran, Iran	Clay	(Mexico) Raúl Ramírez	(Spain) Juan Gisbert Sr. (Spain) Manuel Orantes	7–5, 6–1
Win	11–9	Oct 1976	Madrid, Spain	Clay	(Mexico) Raúl Ramírez	(South Africa) Bob Hewitt (South Africa) Frew McMillan	4–6, 7–5, 6–3
Loss	11–10	Nov 1976	Wembley, England	Carpet	(United States) Brian Gottfried	(United States) Stan Smith (United States) Roscoe Tanner	6–7, 3–6
Win	12–10	Jan 1977	Birmingham WCT, US	Carpet	(Netherlands) Tom Okker	(United States) Billy Martin (United States) Bill Scanlon	6–3, 6–4
Loss	12–11	Jan 1977	Philadelphia WCT, US	Carpet	(Netherlands) Tom Okker	(South Africa) Bob Hewitt (South Africa) Frew McMillan	1–6, 6–1, 3–6
Win	13–11	Feb 1977	Richmond WCT, US	Carpet	(Netherlands) Tom Okker	(Australia) Ross Case (Australia) Tony Roche	6–4, 6–4
Win	14–11	Feb 1977	Mexico City WCT, Mexico	Hard	(Netherlands) Tom Okker	(Romania) Ilie Năstase (Italy) Adriano Panatta	6–2, 6–3
Win	15–11	Feb 1977	Toronto Indoor WCT, Canada	Carpet	(Netherlands) Tom Okker	(Australia) Ross Case (Australia) Tony Roche	6–4, 6–1
Win	16–11	Mar 1977	Monterrey WCT, Mexico	Carpet	(Australia) Ross Case	(United States) Billy Martin (United States) Bill Scanlon	3–6, 6–3, 6–4
Win	17–11	Mar 1977	Rotterdam, Netherlands	Carpet	(Netherlands) Tom Okker	(India) Vijay Amritraj (United States) Dick Stockton	6–4, 6–4
Loss	17–12	Apr 1977	Monte Carlo WCT, Monaco	Clay	(Netherlands) Tom Okker	(France) François Jauffret (Czechoslovakia) Jan Kodeš	6–2, 3–6, 2–6
Win	18–12	Apr 1977	Buenos Aires, Argentina	Clay	(Romania) Ion Țiriac	(Argentina) Lito Álvarez (Argentina) Guillermo Vilas	7–5, 0–6, 7–6
Loss	18–13	Jun 1977	French Open, Paris	Clay	(Czechoslovakia) Jan Kodeš	(United States) Brian Gottfried (Mexico) Raúl Ramírez	6–7, 6–4, 3–6, 4–6
Win	19–13	Aug 1977	South Orange, US	Hard	(Australia) Colin Dibley	(Romania) Ion Țiriac (Argentina) Guillermo Vilas	6–1, 7–5
Win	20–13	Oct 1977	Barcelona, Spain	Clay	(Czechoslovakia) Jan Kodeš	(South Africa) Bob Hewitt (South Africa) Frew McMillan	6–0, 6–4
Loss	20–14	Oct 1977	Vienna, Austria	Hard (i)	(Czechoslovakia) Jan Kodeš	(South Africa) Bob Hewitt (South Africa) Frew McMillan	4–6, 3–6
Win	21–14	Nov 1977	Stockholm, Sweden	Hard (i)	(Netherlands) Tom Okker	(United States) Brian Gottfried (Mexico) Raúl Ramírez	6–3, 6–3
Loss	21–15	Feb 1978	St. Louis WCT, US	Carpet	(Netherlands) Tom Okker	(South Africa) Bob Hewitt (South Africa) Frew McMillan	3–6, 2–6
Loss	21–16	Apr 1978	Milan WCT, Italy	Carpet	(Mexico) Raúl Ramírez	(Spain) José Higueras (Paraguay) Víctor Pecci	7–5, 6–7, 6–7
Win	22–16	Apr 1978	Houston WCT, US	Clay	(Netherlands) Tom Okker	(United States) Tom Leonard (United States) Mike Machette	7–5, 7–5
Win	23–16	May 1978	World Doubles WCT, US	Carpet	(Netherlands) Tom Okker	(United States) Robert Lutz (United States) Stan Smith	6–7, 6–4, 6–0, 6–3
Win	24–16	May 1978	Hamburg, Germany	Clay	(Netherlands) Tom Okker	(Spain) Antonio Muñoz (Paraguay) Víctor Pecci	6–2, 6–4
Win	25–16	Jul 1978	Louisville, US	Clay	(Paraguay) Víctor Pecci	(United States) Victor Amaya (Australia) John James	6–4, 6–7, 6–4
Win	26–16	Aug 1978	Toronto, Canada	Clay	(Netherlands) Tom Okker	(Switzerland) Colin Dowdeswell (Switzerland) Heinz Günthardt	6–3, 7–6
Win	27–16	Sep 1978	Woodlands Doubles, US	Hard	(Netherlands) Tom Okker	(United States) Marty Riessen (United States) Sherwood Stewart	7–6, 3–6, 4–6, 7–6, 6–3
Win	28–16	Oct 1978	Madrid, Spain	Clay	(Czechoslovakia) Jan Kodeš	(Czechoslovakia) Pavel Složil (Czechoslovakia) Tomáš Šmíd	6–7, 6–1, 6–2
Win	29–16	Oct 1978	Basel, Switzerland	Hard (i)	(United States) John McEnroe	(United States) Bruce Manson (Rhodesia) Andrew Pattison	7–6, 7–5
Win	30–16	Nov 1978	Stockholm, Sweden	Hard (i)	(Netherlands) Tom Okker	(United States) Robert Lutz (United States) Stan Smith	6–3, 6–2
Win	31–16	Jan 1979	Australian Open, Melbourne	Grass	(Australia) Kim Warwick	(Australia) Paul Kronk (Australia) Cliff Letcher	7–6, 7–5
Win	32–16	Jan 1979	Philadelphia, US	Carpet	(Netherlands) Tom Okker	(United States) Peter Fleming (United States) John McEnroe	5–7, 6–1, 6–3
Loss	32–17	Feb 1979	Denver, US	Carpet	(Netherlands) Tom Okker	(United States) Robert Lutz (United States) Stan Smith	6–7, 3–6
Win	33–17	Mar 1979	Memphis, US	Carpet	(Netherlands) Tom Okker	(South Africa) Frew McMillan (United States) Dick Stockton	6–4, 6–4
Win	34–17	Apr 1979	Stuttgart Indoor, Germany	Hard (i)	(Netherlands) Tom Okker	(Australia) Bob Carmichael (United States) Brian Teacher	6–3, 5–7, 7–6
Win	35–17	May 1979	Munich, Germany	Clay	(Netherlands) Tom Okker	(West Germany) Jürgen Fassbender (France) Jean-Louis Haillet	7–6, 7–5
Loss	35–18	Jul 1979	Stuttgart Outdoor, Germany	Clay	(Czechoslovakia) Pavel Složil	(Switzerland) Colin Dowdeswell (South Africa) Frew McMillan	4–6, 2–6, 6–2, 4–6
Loss	35–19	Sep 1979	Los Angeles, US	Carpet	(South Africa) Frew McMillan	(United States) Marty Riessen (United States) Sherwood Stewart	4–6, 4–6
Loss	35–20	Sep 1979	San Francisco, US	Carpet	(South Africa) Frew McMillan	(United States) Peter Fleming (United States) John McEnroe	1–6, 4–6
Loss	35–21	Nov 1979	Stockholm, Sweden	Hard (i)	(Netherlands) Tom Okker	(United States) Peter Fleming (United States) John McEnroe	4–6, 4–6
Loss	35–22	Jan 1980	Masters Doubles WCT, London	Carpet	(Netherlands) Tom Okker	(United States) Brian Gottfried (Mexico) Raúl Ramírez	6–3, 4–6, 4–6, 6–3, 3–6
Win	36–22	Jan 1980	Birmingham, US	Carpet	(Netherlands) Tom Okker	(Argentina) José Luis Clerc (Romania) Ilie Năstase	6–3, 6–3
Loss	36–23	Feb 1980	Denver, US	Carpet	(Switzerland) Heinz Günthardt	(South Africa) Kevin Curren (United States) Steve Denton	5–7, 2–6
Win	37–23	Mar 1980	Stuttgart Indoor, Germany	Hard (i)	(Czechoslovakia) Tomáš Šmíd	(United States) Tim Mayotte (United States) Larry Stefanki	6–4, 7–6
Win	38–23	Mar 1980	Dayton, US	Carpet	(Australia) Geoff Masters	(United States) Fritz Buehning (United States) Fred McNair	6–4, 6–4
Loss	38–24	Apr 1980	Las Vegas, US	Clay	(United States) Gene Mayer	(United States) Robert Lutz (United States) Stan Smith	2–6, 5–7
Loss	38–25	Aug 1980	Indianapolis, US	Clay	(Czechoslovakia) Ivan Lendl	(South Africa) Kevin Curren (United States) Steve Denton	6–3, 6–7, 4–6
Loss	38–26	Aug 1980	Cincinnati, US	Hard	(Czechoslovakia) Ivan Lendl	(United States) Bruce Manson (United States) Brian Teacher	7–6, 5–7, 4–6
Win	39–26	Mar 1982	Strasbourg WCT, France	Carpet	(Australia) John Fitzgerald	(United States) Sandy Mayer (South Africa) Frew McMillan	6–4, 6–3
Loss	39–27	Apr 1982	Zürich WCT, Switzerland	Carpet	(Australia) John Fitzgerald	(United States) Sammy Giammalva Jr. (United States) Tom Gullikson	4–6, 2–6
Loss	39–28	May 1982	Rome, Italy	Clay	(Australia) John Fitzgerald	(Switzerland) Heinz Günthardt (Hungary) Balázs Taróczy	4–6, 6–4, 3–6
Win	40–28	Jul 1982	Zell Am See WCT, Austria	Clay	(United States) Bruce Manson	(United States) Tony Giammalva (United States) Sammy Giammalva Jr.	6–7, 6–4, 6–4
Loss	40–29	Jul 1983	Gstaad, Switzerland	Clay	(United Kingdom) Colin Dowdeswell	(Czechoslovakia) Pavel Složil (Czechoslovakia) Tomáš Šmíd	7–6, 4–6, 2–6
Win	41–29	Jul 1983	Kitzbühel, Austria	Clay	(Czechoslovakia) Pavel Složil	(United Kingdom) Colin Dowdeswell (Hungary) Zoltán Kuhárszky	7–5, 6–2
Win	42–29	Mar 1984	Rotterdam, Netherlands	Carpet	(South Africa) Kevin Curren	(United States) Fritz Buehning (United States) Ferdi Taygan	6–4, 6–4
Win	43–29	May 1984	Munich, Germany	Clay	(West Germany) Boris Becker	(United States) Eric Fromm (Romania) Florin Segărceanu	6–4, 4–6, 6–1
Loss	43–30	Jul 1984	Kitzbühel, Austria	Clay	(United Kingdom) Colin Dowdeswell	(France) Henri Leconte (France) Pascal Portes	6–2, 6–7, 6–7
Loss	43–31	Sep 1984	Los Angeles, US	Hard	(United States) Sandy Mayer	(United States) Ken Flach (United States) Robert Seguso	6–4, 4–6, 3–6
Win	44–31	Oct 1984	Cologne, Germany	Hard (i)	(United States) Sandy Mayer	(Sweden) Jan Gunnarsson (Sweden) Joakim Nyström	6–1, 6–3
Win	45–31	Oct 1984	Vienna, Austria	Hard (i)	(United States) Sandy Mayer	(Switzerland) Heinz Günthardt (Hungary) Balázs Taróczy	6–4, 6–4
Loss	45–32	Jan 1985	Philadelphia, US	Carpet	(United States) Sandy Mayer	(Sweden) Joakim Nyström (Sweden) Mats Wilander	6–3, 2–6, 2–6
Loss	45–33	Mar 1985	Brussels, Belgium	Carpet	(South Africa) Kevin Curren	(Sweden) Stefan Edberg (Sweden) Anders Järryd	3–6, 6–7
Win	46–33	Jul 1985	Gstaad, Switzerland	Clay	(Czechoslovakia) Tomáš Šmíd	(Australia) Brad Drewett (Australia) Mark Edmondson	6–7, 6–4, 6–4
Win	47–33	Feb 1986	Toronto Indoor, Canada	Carpet	(Sweden) Joakim Nyström	(South Africa) Christo Steyn (South Africa) Danie Visser	6–3, 7–6
Win	48–33	Mar 1986	Metz, France	Carpet	(France) Guy Forget	(Paraguay) Francisco González (Netherlands) Michiel Schapers	2–6, 6–2, 6–4
Loss	48–34	Mar 1986	Rotterdam, Netherlands	Carpet	(United States) Matt Mitchell	(Sweden) Stefan Edberg (Socialist Federal Republic of Yugoslavia) Slobodan Živojinović	6–2, 3–6, 2–6
Win	49–34	Oct 1986	Vienna, Austria	Hard (i)	(Brazil) Ricardo Acioly	(United States) Brad Gilbert (Socialist Federal Republic of Yugoslavia) Slobodan Živojinović	W/O
Win	50–34	Aug 1987	Hilversum, Netherlands	Clay	(Czechoslovakia) Miloslav Mečíř	(Netherlands) Tom Nijssen (Netherlands) Johan Vekemans	7–6, 5–7, 6–2
Win	51–34	Oct 1987	Toulouse, France	Hard (i)	(Netherlands) Michiel Schapers	(United States) Kelly Jones (West Germany) Patrik Kühnen	6–2, 6–4

== Grand Slam doubles performance timeline ==
Key
W	F	SF	QF	#R	RR	Q#	DNQ	A	NH

(W) winner; (F) finalist; (SF) semifinalist; (QF) quarterfinalist; (#R) rounds 4, 3, 2, 1; (RR) round-robin stage; (Q#) qualification round; (DNQ) did not qualify; (A) absent; (NH) not held; (SR) strike rate (events won / competed); (W–L) win–loss record.

Tournament	1974	1975	1976	1977	1978	1979	1980	1981	1982	1983	1984	1985	1986	1987	Career SR
Australian Open	A	A	A	A	W	A	A	A	A	A	A	A	NH	A	1 / 1
French Open	1R	3R	3R	F	SF	2R	SF	A	2R	1R	1R	1R	1R	1R	0 / 13
Wimbledon	A	2R	QF	QF	SF	1R	2R	A	A	2R	1R	1R	3R	2R	0 / 11
US Open	A	2R	2R	2R	SF	2R	3R	1R	3R	A	3R	2R	1R	2R	0 / 12
Annual win–loss	0–1	3–3	5–3	9–3	17–3	2–3	7–3	0–1	3–2	1–2	2–3	1–3	2–3	2–3	N/A

Awards and achievements
Preceded by Vitas Gerulaitis	ATP Most Improved Player; 1976	Succeeded by Brian Gottfried
