= 1976 Grand Prix (tennis) =

Tennis circuit

1976 Grand Prix circuit
Details
- Duration: 28 December 1975 – 13 December 1976
- Edition: 7th
- Tournaments: 48
- Categories: TC events (3); GPM events (1); 5 Star events (4); 4 Star events (9); 3 Star events (10); 2 Star events (8); 1 Star events (11)

Achievements (singles)
- Most titles: (United States) Jimmy Connors (7)
- Most finals: (Spain) Manuel Orantes (10)
- Prize money leader: (Mexico) Raúl Ramírez ($190,000)
- Points leader: (Mexico) Raúl Ramírez (938)

Awards
- Player of the year: (Sweden) Björn Borg
- Newcomer of the year: (Poland) Wojciech Fibak

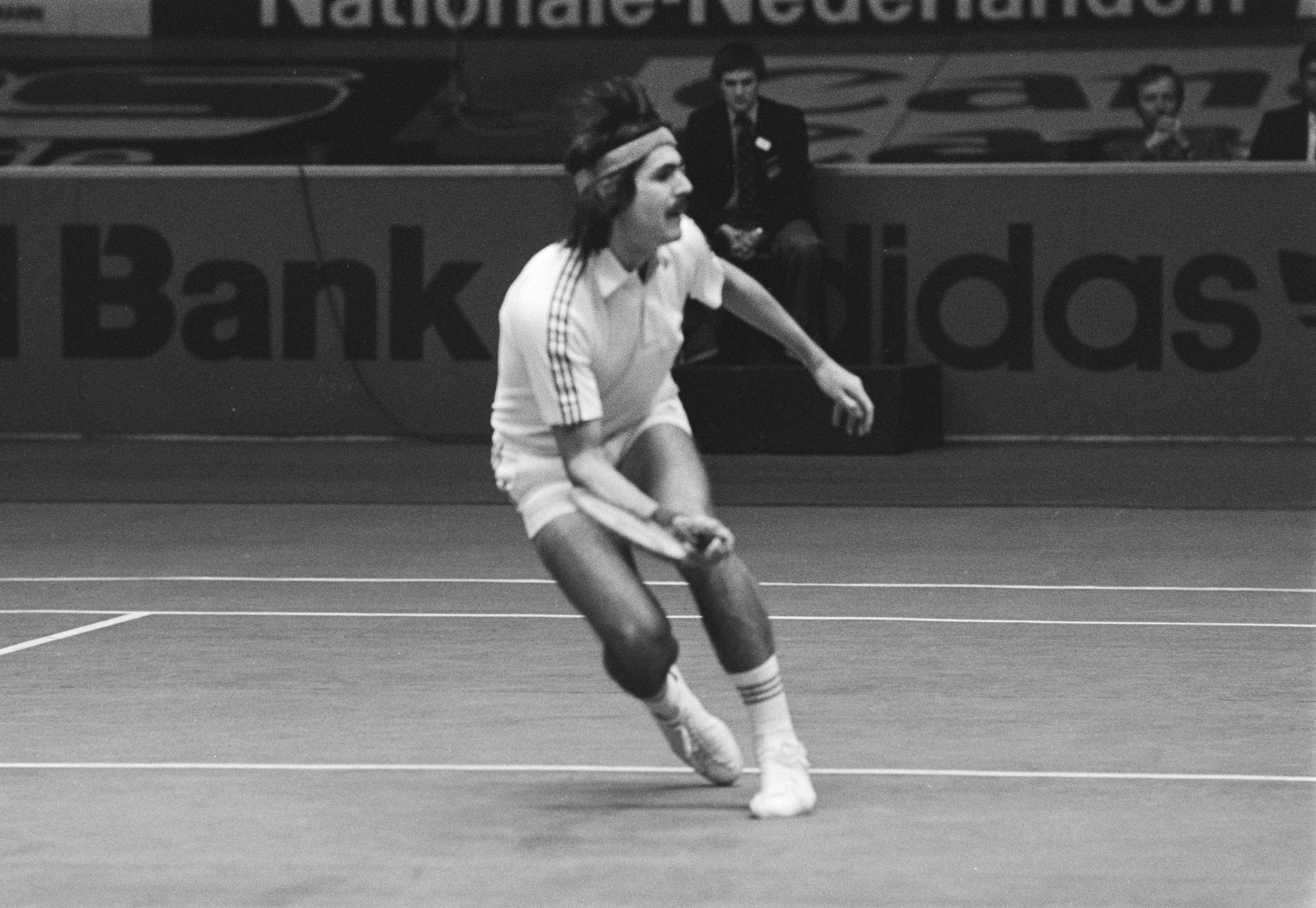
Raúl Ramírez was the 1976 Grand Prix No. 1. Ramírez won two tournaments during the season.

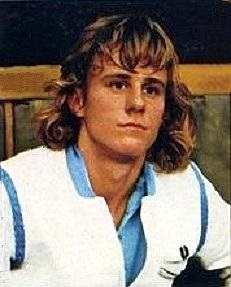
Björn Borg was named the ATP Player of the Year. Borg won three tournaments during the season, including a major at the Wimbledon Championships, and finished runner-up at another major at the US Open.

The 1976 Commercial Union Assurance Grand Prix was a professional tennis circuit administered by the International Lawn Tennis Federation (ILTF) which served as a forerunner to the current Association of Tennis Professionals (ATP) World Tour and the Women's Tennis Association (WTA) Tour. The circuit consisted of the four modern Grand Slam tournaments and open tournaments recognised by the ILTF. The Commercial Union Assurance Masters is included in this calendar but did not count towards the Grand Prix ranking.

The 1976 Grand Prix circuit consisted of 48 tournaments held in 21 different countries.

== Schedule ==
Key

Triple Crown
Grand Prix Masters
Five-star events
Four-star events
Three-star events
Two-star events
One-star events
Team events

=== December 1975 ===
Week	Tournament	Champions	Runners-up	Semifinalists	Quarterfinalists
28 Dec	Australian Open; Melbourne, Australia; Grand Slam; Two Star; Grass – $75,000 – 64S/32D; Singles – Doubles	(Australia) Mark Edmondson; 6–7, 6–3, 7–6, 6–1	(Australia) John Newcombe	(Australia) Ken Rosewall (Australia) Ray Ruffels	(Australia) Brad Drewett (Australia) Dick Crealy (Australia) Tony Roche (Australia) Ross Case
28 Dec	Australian Open; Melbourne, Australia; Grand Slam; Two Star; Grass – $75,000 – 64S/32D; Singles – Doubles	(Australia) John Newcombe (Australia) Tony Roche; 7–6, 6–4	(Australia) Ross Case (Australia) Geoff Masters	(Australia) Ken Rosewall (Australia) Ray Ruffels	(Australia) Brad Drewett (Australia) Dick Crealy (Australia) Tony Roche (Australia) Ross Case

=== May ===
Week	Tournament	Champions	Runners-up	Semifinalists	Quarterfinalists
4 May	Romika Cup; Munich, West Germany; Clay – $50,000 – 32S/16D; One Star; Singles – Doubles	(Spain) Manuel Orantes; 6–1, 6–4, 6–1	(West Germany) Karl Meiler	(Austria) Hans Kary (Czechoslovakia) Jan Kodeš	(France) François Jauffret (United States) Mike Cahill (Czechoslovakia) Jiří Hřebec (Spain) Juan Gisbert Sr.
4 May	Romika Cup; Munich, West Germany; Clay – $50,000 – 32S/16D; One Star; Singles – Doubles	(Spain) Juan Gisbert Sr. (Spain) Manuel Orantes; 1–6, 6–3, 6–2, 2–3 RET.	(West Germany) Jürgen Fassbender (West Germany) Hans-Jürgen Pohmann	(Austria) Hans Kary (Czechoslovakia) Jan Kodeš	(France) François Jauffret (United States) Mike Cahill (Czechoslovakia) Jiří Hřebec (Spain) Juan Gisbert Sr.
11 May	Coca-Cola British Hard Court Championships; Bournemouth, Great Britain; Clay – 48S/24D/16XD; Two Star	(Poland) Wojciech Fibak; 6–2, 7–9, 6–2, 6–2	(Spain) Manuel Orantes	(Italy) Corrado Barazzutti (France) François Jauffret	(Austria) Hans Kary (United States) Norman Holmes (Colombia) Iván Molina (France) Jean-François Caujolle
11 May	Coca-Cola British Hard Court Championships; Bournemouth, Great Britain; Clay – 48S/24D/16XD; Two Star	(Poland) Wojciech Fibak (United States) Fred McNair; 4–6, 7–5, 7–5	(Spain) Juan Gisbert Sr. (Spain) Manuel Orantes	(Italy) Corrado Barazzutti (France) François Jauffret	(Austria) Hans Kary (United States) Norman Holmes (Colombia) Iván Molina (France) Jean-François Caujolle
11 May	Coca-Cola British Hard Court Championships; Bournemouth, Great Britain; Clay – 48S/24D/16XD; Two Star	(South Africa) Linky Boshoff (Rhodesia) Colin Dowdeswell; 6–8, 8–6, 6–1	(South Africa) Ilana Kloss (South Africa) Byron Bertram	(Italy) Corrado Barazzutti (France) François Jauffret	(Austria) Hans Kary (United States) Norman Holmes (Colombia) Iván Molina (France) Jean-François Caujolle
18 May	German Open; Hamburg, West Germany; Clay – $100,000 – 64S/32D; Three Star	(United States) Eddie Dibbs; 6–4, 4–6, 6–1, 2–6, 6–1	(Spain) Manuel Orantes	(Chile) Jaime Fillol (Austria) Hans Kary	(West Germany) Ulrich Pinner (Czechoslovakia) Jiří Hřebec (Hungary) Balázs Taróczy (Spain) José Higueras
18 May	German Open; Hamburg, West Germany; Clay – $100,000 – 64S/32D; Three Star	(United States) Fred McNair (United States) Sherwood Stewart; 7–6, 7–6, 7–6	(Australia) Dick Crealy (Australia) Kim Warwick	(Chile) Jaime Fillol (Austria) Hans Kary	(West Germany) Ulrich Pinner (Czechoslovakia) Jiří Hřebec (Hungary) Balázs Taróczy (Spain) José Higueras
25 May	Italian Open; Rome, Italy; Clay – $150,000 – 64S/32D; Five Star	(Italy) Adriano Panatta; 2–6, 7–6, 6–2, 7–6	(Argentina) Guillermo Vilas	(United States) Eddie Dibbs (Australia) John Newcombe	(Italy) Corrado Barazzutti (Australia) Mark Edmondson (United States) Harold Solomon (Czechoslovakia) Jan Kodeš
25 May	Italian Open; Rome, Italy; Clay – $150,000 – 64S/32D; Five Star	(United States) Brian Gottfried (Mexico) Raúl Ramírez; 7–6, 5–7, 6–3, 3–6, 6–3 (Note: This match was stopped at two sets all due to bad light. The final set was played on 15 September during the Grow Professional Doubles Championships.)	(Australia) Geoff Masters (Australia) John Newcombe	(United States) Eddie Dibbs (Australia) John Newcombe	(Italy) Corrado Barazzutti (Australia) Mark Edmondson (United States) Harold Solomon (Czechoslovakia) Jan Kodeš
25 May	Agfa Colour Cup; Düsseldorf, West Germany; Clay – $50,000 – 48S/24D; Two Star; Singles – Doubles	(Sweden) Björn Borg; 6–2, 6–2, 6–0	(Spain) Manuel Orantes	(Spain) José Higueras (Chile) Jaime Fillol	(South Africa) Byron Bertram (Australia) Dick Crealy (Poland) Wojciech Fibak (Sweden) Kjell Johansson
25 May	Agfa Colour Cup; Düsseldorf, West Germany; Clay – $50,000 – 48S/24D; Two Star; Singles – Doubles	(Poland) Wojciech Fibak (West Germany) Karl Meiler; 6–4, 4–6, 6–4	(Australia) Bob Carmichael (South Africa) Raymond Moore	(Spain) José Higueras (Chile) Jaime Fillol	(South Africa) Byron Bertram (Australia) Dick Crealy (Poland) Wojciech Fibak (Sweden) Kjell Johansson
31 May	French Open; Paris, France; Grand Slam; Triple Crown; Clay – 128S/64D/32XD; Singles – Doubles – Mixed doubles	(Italy) Adriano Panatta; 6–1, 6–4, 4–6, 7–6^{(7–3)}	(United States) Harold Solomon	(United States) Eddie Dibbs (Mexico) Raúl Ramírez	(Sweden) Björn Borg (Spain) Manuel Orantes (Hungary) Balázs Taróczy (Argentina) Guillermo Vilas
31 May	French Open; Paris, France; Grand Slam; Triple Crown; Clay – 128S/64D/32XD; Singles – Doubles – Mixed doubles	(United States) Fred McNair (United States) Sherwood Stewart; 7–6^{(8–6)}, 6–3, 6–1	(United States) Brian Gottfried (Mexico) Raúl Ramírez	(United States) Eddie Dibbs (Mexico) Raúl Ramírez	(Sweden) Björn Borg (Spain) Manuel Orantes (Hungary) Balázs Taróczy (Argentina) Guillermo Vilas
31 May	French Open; Paris, France; Grand Slam; Triple Crown; Clay – 128S/64D/32XD; Singles – Doubles – Mixed doubles	(South Africa) Ilana Kloss (Australia) Kim Warwick; 5–7, 7–6, 6–2	(South Africa) Linky Boshoff (Rhodesia) Colin Dowdeswell	(United States) Eddie Dibbs (Mexico) Raúl Ramírez	(Sweden) Björn Borg (Spain) Manuel Orantes (Hungary) Balázs Taróczy (Argentina) Guillermo Vilas

=== June ===
Week	Tournament	Champions	Runners-up	Semifinalists	Quarterfinalists
14 Jun	John Player Open; Nottingham, Great Britain; Grass – $100,000 – 64S/32D; Three Star	No Winner	(United States) Jimmy Connors (Romania) Ilie Năstase; 6–2, 4–6, 1–1 Match Abandoned	(Mexico) Raúl Ramírez (Sweden) Ove Bengtson	(Netherlands) Tom Okker (India) Vijay Amritraj (Egypt) Ismail El Shafei (United Kingdom) Roger Taylor
14 Jun	John Player Open; Nottingham, Great Britain; Grass – $100,000 – 64S/32D; Three Star	Not completed. (5 pairs remaining)		(Mexico) Raúl Ramírez (Sweden) Ove Bengtson	(Netherlands) Tom Okker (India) Vijay Amritraj (Egypt) Ismail El Shafei (United Kingdom) Roger Taylor
14 Jun	Berlin Grand Prix; Berlin, West Germany; Clay – $50,000 – 32S/15D; One Star	(Paraguay) Víctor Pecci; 6–1, 6–2, 5–7, 6–3	(West Germany) Hans-Jürgen Pohmann	(Argentina) Julián Ganzábal (Argentina) Ricardo Cano	(Chile) Belus Prajoux (Spain) Juan Gisbert Sr. (Poland) Wojciech Fibak (West Germany) Werner Zirngibl
14 Jun	Berlin Grand Prix; Berlin, West Germany; Clay – $50,000 – 32S/15D; One Star	(Chile) Patricio Cornejo (Spain) Antonio Muñoz; 7–5, 6–1	(West Germany) Jürgen Fassbender (West Germany) Hans-Jürgen Pohmann	(Argentina) Julián Ganzábal (Argentina) Ricardo Cano	(Chile) Belus Prajoux (Spain) Juan Gisbert Sr. (Poland) Wojciech Fibak (West Germany) Werner Zirngibl
21 Jun	Wimbledon Championships; London, Great Britain; Grand Slam; Triple Crown; Grass – $160,000 – 128S/64D/64XD; Singles – Doubles – Mixed doubles	(Sweden) Björn Borg; 6–4, 6–2, 9–7	(Romania) Ilie Năstase	(Mexico) Raúl Ramírez (United States) Roscoe Tanner	(United States) Vitas Gerulaitis (United States) Charlie Pasarell (Argentina) Guillermo Vilas (United States) Jimmy Connors
21 Jun	Wimbledon Championships; London, Great Britain; Grand Slam; Triple Crown; Grass – $160,000 – 128S/64D/64XD; Singles – Doubles – Mixed doubles	(United States) Brian Gottfried (Mexico) Raúl Ramírez; 3–6, 6–3, 8–6, 2–6, 7–5	(Australia) Ross Case (Australia) Geoff Masters	(Mexico) Raúl Ramírez (United States) Roscoe Tanner	(United States) Vitas Gerulaitis (United States) Charlie Pasarell (Argentina) Guillermo Vilas (United States) Jimmy Connors
21 Jun	Wimbledon Championships; London, Great Britain; Grand Slam; Triple Crown; Grass – $160,000 – 128S/64D/64XD; Singles – Doubles – Mixed doubles	(France) Françoise Dürr (Australia) Tony Roche; 6–3, 2–6, 7–5	(United States) Rosemary Casals (United States) Dick Stockton	(Mexico) Raúl Ramírez (United States) Roscoe Tanner	(United States) Vitas Gerulaitis (United States) Charlie Pasarell (Argentina) Guillermo Vilas (United States) Jimmy Connors

=== July ===
Week	Tournament	Champions	Runners-up	Semifinalists	Quarterfinalists
5 Jul	Swedish Open; Båstad, Sweden; Clay – $100,000 – 64S/32D; Three Star	(Italy) Antonio Zugarelli; 4–6, 7–5, 6–2	(Italy) Corrado Barazzutti	(South Africa) Byron Bertram (United States) Billy Martin	(United States) Fred McNair (United States) Peter Fleming (South Africa) Raymond Moore (Norway) Per Hegna
5 Jul	Swedish Open; Båstad, Sweden; Clay – $100,000 – 64S/32D; Three Star	(United States) Fred McNair (United States) Sherwood Stewart; 6–3, 6–4	(Poland) Wojciech Fibak (Spain) Juan Gisbert Sr.	(South Africa) Byron Bertram (United States) Billy Martin	(United States) Fred McNair (United States) Peter Fleming (South Africa) Raymond Moore (Norway) Per Hegna
5 Jul	Swiss Open Championships; Gstaad, Switzerland; Clay – $75,000 – 48S/24D; Two Star	(Mexico) Raúl Ramírez; 7–5, 6–7, 6–1, 6–3	(Italy) Adriano Panatta	(Czechoslovakia) Jan Kodeš (Australia) Onny Parun	(Italy) Paolo Bertolucci (United States) Jeff Borowiak (West Germany) Karl Meiler (Argentina) Ricardo Cano
5 Jul	Swiss Open Championships; Gstaad, Switzerland; Clay – $75,000 – 48S/24D; Two Star	(West Germany) Jürgen Fassbender (West Germany) Hans-Jürgen Pohmann; 7–5, 6–3, 6–3	(Italy) Paolo Bertolucci (Italy) Adriano Panatta	(Czechoslovakia) Jan Kodeš (Australia) Onny Parun	(Italy) Paolo Bertolucci (United States) Jeff Borowiak (West Germany) Karl Meiler (Argentina) Ricardo Cano
12 Jul	Western Championships; Cincinnati, United States; Clay – $100,000 – 64S/32D; Three Star	(United States) Roscoe Tanner; 4–6, 7–5, 6–2	(United States) Eddie Dibbs	(United States) Dick Stockton (Australia) Dick Crealy	(United States) Trey Waltke (United States) Stan Smith (United States) Bill Scanlon (United States) Cliff Richey
12 Jul	Western Championships; Cincinnati, United States; Clay – $100,000 – 64S/32D; Three Star	(United States) Stan Smith (United States) Erik van Dillen; 6–1, 6–1	(United States) Eddie Dibbs (United States) Harold Solomon	(United States) Dick Stockton (Australia) Dick Crealy	(United States) Trey Waltke (United States) Stan Smith (United States) Bill Scanlon (United States) Cliff Richey
12 Jul	Dutch Championships; Hilversum, Netherlands; Clay – $75,000 – 32S/16D; One Star	(Hungary) Balázs Taróczy; 6–7, 2–6, 6–1, 6–3	(Argentina) Ricardo Cano	(Spain) Ángel Giménez (Chile) Belus Prajoux	(Spain) Manuel Santana (United Kingdom) Robin Drysdale (South Africa) Raymond Moore (France) Jean-François Caujolle
12 Jul	Dutch Championships; Hilversum, Netherlands; Clay – $75,000 – 32S/16D; One Star	(Argentina) Ricardo Cano (Chile) Belus Prajoux; 6–4, 6–3	(Poland) Wojciech Fibak (Hungary) Balázs Taróczy	(Spain) Ángel Giménez (Chile) Belus Prajoux	(Spain) Manuel Santana (United Kingdom) Robin Drysdale (South Africa) Raymond Moore (France) Jean-François Caujolle
19 Jul	Head Cup; Kitzbühel, Austria; Clay – $75,000 – 64S/32D; Two Star	(Spain) Manuel Orantes; 7–6, 6–2, 7–6	(Czechoslovakia) Jan Kodeš	(West Germany) Hans-Jürgen Pohmann (France) François Jauffret	(France) Jean-Louis Haillet (United States) Charlie Pasarell (Bolivia) Ramiro Benavides (United States) Jeff Borowiak
19 Jul	Head Cup; Kitzbühel, Austria; Clay – $75,000 – 64S/32D; Two Star	(Czechoslovakia) Jiří Hřebec (Czechoslovakia) Jan Kodeš; 6–7, 6–2, 6–4	(West Germany) Jürgen Fassbender (West Germany) Hans-Jürgen Pohmann	(West Germany) Hans-Jürgen Pohmann (France) François Jauffret	(France) Jean-Louis Haillet (United States) Charlie Pasarell (Bolivia) Ramiro Benavides (United States) Jeff Borowiak
26 Jul	Washington Star International; Washington, D.C., USA; Clay – $125,000 – 64S/32D; Four star	(United States) Jimmy Connors; 6–2, 6–4	(Mexico) Raúl Ramírez	(New Zealand) Brian Fairlie (South Africa) Raymond Moore	(United States) Dick Stockton (Paraguay) Víctor Pecci (United States) Stan Smith (United States) Eddie Dibbs
26 Jul	Washington Star International; Washington, D.C., USA; Clay – $125,000 – 64S/32D; Four star	(United States) Brian Gottfried (Mexico) Raúl Ramírez; 6–3, 6–3	(United States) Arthur Ashe (United States) Jimmy Connors	(New Zealand) Brian Fairlie (South Africa) Raymond Moore	(United States) Dick Stockton (Paraguay) Víctor Pecci (United States) Stan Smith (United States) Eddie Dibbs

=== August ===
Week	Tournament	Champions	Runners-up	Semifinalists	Quarterfinalists
2 Aug	Louisville International; Louisville, United States; Clay – $125,000 – 64S/32D; Four Star	(United States) Harold Solomon; 6–2, 7–5	(Poland) Wojciech Fibak	(United States) Dick Stockton (United States) Stan Smith	(Argentina) Guillermo Vilas (Chile) Jaime Fillol (Mexico) Raúl Ramírez (Paraguay) Víctor Pecci
2 Aug	Louisville International; Louisville, United States; Clay – $125,000 – 64S/32D; Four Star	(South Africa) Byron Bertram (South Africa) Pat Cramer; 6–3, 6–4	(United States) Stan Smith (United States) Erik van Dillen	(United States) Dick Stockton (United States) Stan Smith	(Argentina) Guillermo Vilas (Chile) Jaime Fillol (Mexico) Raúl Ramírez (Paraguay) Víctor Pecci
2 Aug	Volvo International; North Conway, United States $100,000 – Clay – 64S/32D; Three Star; Singles – Doubles	(United States) Jimmy Connors; 7–6, 4–6, 6–3	(Mexico) Raúl Ramírez	(Socialist Federal Republic of Yugoslavia) Željko Franulović (United States) Cliff Richey	(United States) Eddie Dibbs (Poland) Wojciech Fibak (United States) Brian Gottfried (Spain) Manuel Orantes
2 Aug	Volvo International; North Conway, United States $100,000 – Clay – 64S/32D; Three Star; Singles – Doubles	(United States) Brian Gottfried (Mexico) Raúl Ramírez; 6–3, 6–0	(Argentina) Ricardo Cano (Paraguay) Víctor Pecci	(Socialist Federal Republic of Yugoslavia) Željko Franulović (United States) Cliff Richey	(United States) Eddie Dibbs (Poland) Wojciech Fibak (United States) Brian Gottfried (Spain) Manuel Orantes
2 Aug	Buckeye Tennis Championships; Columbus, United States; Clay – 48S/24D; Two Star	(United States) Roscoe Tanner; 6–4, 7–6^{(7–5)}	(United States) Stan Smith	(United States) Brian Teacher (India) Vijay Amritraj	(Chile) Patricio Cornejo (United States) Dick Stockton (Australia) Colin Dibley (India) Anand Amritraj
2 Aug	Buckeye Tennis Championships; Columbus, United States; Clay – 48S/24D; Two Star	(United States) William Brown (United States) Brian Teacher; 6–3, 6–4	(United States) Fred McNair (United States) Sherwood Stewart	(United States) Brian Teacher (India) Vijay Amritraj	(Chile) Patricio Cornejo (United States) Dick Stockton (Australia) Colin Dibley (India) Anand Amritraj
9 Aug	U.S. Clay Court Championships; Indianapolis, United States; Four Star; Clay – $125,000 – 64S/32D; Singles – Doubles	(United States) Jimmy Connors; 6–2, 6–4	(Poland) Wojciech Fibak	(United States) Harold Solomon (Argentina) Guillermo Vilas	(United States) Eddie Dibbs (Spain) Manuel Orantes (United Kingdom) Buster Mottram (United States) Brian Gottfried
9 Aug	U.S. Clay Court Championships; Indianapolis, United States; Four Star; Clay – $125,000 – 64S/32D; Singles – Doubles	(United States) Brian Gottfried (Mexico) Raúl Ramírez; 6–2, 6–2	(United States) Fred McNair (United States) Sherwood Stewart	(United States) Harold Solomon (Argentina) Guillermo Vilas	(United States) Eddie Dibbs (Spain) Manuel Orantes (United Kingdom) Buster Mottram (United States) Brian Gottfried
16 Aug	Rothmans Canadian Open; Toronto, Ontario, Canada; Clay – $125,000 – 64S/32D; Four Star	(Argentina) Guillermo Vilas; 6–4, 7–6, 6–2	(Poland) Wojciech Fibak	(Chile) Jaime Fillol (New Zealand) Brian Fairlie	(New Zealand) Onny Parun (Italy) Paolo Bertolucci (Paraguay) Víctor Pecci (South Africa) Bob Hewitt
16 Aug	Rothmans Canadian Open; Toronto, Ontario, Canada; Clay – $125,000 – 64S/32D; Four Star	(South Africa) Bob Hewitt (Mexico) Raúl Ramírez; 6–2, 6–1	(Spain) Juan Gisbert Sr. (Spain) Manuel Orantes	(Chile) Jaime Fillol (New Zealand) Brian Fairlie	(New Zealand) Onny Parun (Italy) Paolo Bertolucci (Paraguay) Víctor Pecci (South Africa) Bob Hewitt
23 Aug	U.S. Professional Tennis Championships; Boston, United States; Clay – $125,000 – 64S/32D; Four Star; Singles – Doubles	(Sweden) Björn Borg; 6–7^{(3–7)}, 6–4, 6–1, 6–2	(United States) Harold Solomon	(Mexico) Raúl Ramírez (United States) Eddie Dibbs	(United States) Jimmy Connors (Italy) Paolo Bertolucci (Argentina) Guillermo Vilas (Italy) Adriano Panatta
23 Aug	U.S. Professional Tennis Championships; Boston, United States; Clay – $125,000 – 64S/32D; Four Star; Singles – Doubles	(Australia) Ray Ruffels (Australia) Allan Stone; 3–6, 6–3, 7–6	(United States) Mike Cahill (United States) John Whitlinger	(Mexico) Raúl Ramírez (United States) Eddie Dibbs	(United States) Jimmy Connors (Italy) Paolo Bertolucci (Argentina) Guillermo Vilas (Italy) Adriano Panatta
23 Aug	Tennis Week Open; South Orange, United States; Clay – $50,000 – 32S/16D; One Star	(Romania) Ilie Năstase; 6–4, 6–2	(United States) Roscoe Tanner	(Hungary) Balázs Taróczy (New Zealand) Onny Parun	(India) Vijay Amritraj (United Kingdom) Buster Mottram (South Africa) Bernard Mitton (Socialist Federal Republic of Yugoslavia) Željko Franulović
23 Aug	Tennis Week Open; South Orange, United States; Clay – $50,000 – 32S/16D; One Star	(United States) Fred McNair (United States) Marty Riessen; 7–5, 4–6, 6–2	(United States) Vitas Gerulaitis (Romania) Ilie Năstase	(Hungary) Balázs Taróczy (New Zealand) Onny Parun	(India) Vijay Amritraj (United Kingdom) Buster Mottram (South Africa) Bernard Mitton (Socialist Federal Republic of Yugoslavia) Željko Franulović
30 Aug	US Open; New York City, United States; Grand Slam; Triple Crown; Clay – $217,000 – 128S/64D/32XD; Singles – Doubles – Mixed doubles	(United States) Jimmy Connors; 6–4, 3–6, 7–6^{(11–9)}, 6–4	(Sweden) Björn Borg	(Argentina) Guillermo Vilas (Romania) Ilie Năstase	(Czechoslovakia) Jan Kodeš (United States) Eddie Dibbs (United States) Dick Stockton (Spain) Manuel Orantes
30 Aug	US Open; New York City, United States; Grand Slam; Triple Crown; Clay – $217,000 – 128S/64D/32XD; Singles – Doubles – Mixed doubles	(Netherlands) Tom Okker (United States) Marty Riessen; 6–4, 6–4	(Australia) Paul Kronk (Australia) Cliff Letcher	(Argentina) Guillermo Vilas (Romania) Ilie Năstase	(Czechoslovakia) Jan Kodeš (United States) Eddie Dibbs (United States) Dick Stockton (Spain) Manuel Orantes
30 Aug	US Open; New York City, United States; Grand Slam; Triple Crown; Clay – $217,000 – 128S/64D/32XD; Singles – Doubles – Mixed doubles	(Netherlands) Betty Stöve (South Africa) Frew McMillan; 6–3, 7–6	(United States) Billie Jean King (Australia) Ray Ruffels	(Argentina) Guillermo Vilas (Romania) Ilie Năstase	(Czechoslovakia) Jan Kodeš (United States) Eddie Dibbs (United States) Dick Stockton (Spain) Manuel Orantes

=== September ===
Week	Tournament	Champions	Runners-up	Semifinalists	Quarterfinalists
13 Sep	Grow Professional Doubles Championships; The Woodlands, United States; Hard – $100,000 – 16D	(United States) Brian Gottfried (Mexico) Raúl Ramírez; 6–1, 6–4, 5–7, 7–6	(Australia) Phil Dent (Australia) Allan Stone	(United States) McNair / (United States) Stewart (Egypt) El Shafei / (New Zealand) Fairlie	
13 Sep	Bermuda Classic; Bermuda; Clay – $50,000 – 32S/16D; One Star	(United States) Cliff Richey; 7–6, 6–2	(United States) Gene Mayer	(Australia) Dick Crealy (South Africa) John Yuill	(United Kingdom) John Lloyd (Chile) Álvaro Fillol (United States) Steve Krulevitz (Hungary) Balázs Taróczy
13 Sep	Bermuda Classic; Bermuda; Clay – $50,000 – 32S/16D; One Star	(United States) Mike Cahill (United States) John Whitlinger; 6–4, 4–6, 7–6	(Australia) Mark Edmondson (Australia) John Marks	(Australia) Dick Crealy (South Africa) John Yuill	(United Kingdom) John Lloyd (Chile) Álvaro Fillol (United States) Steve Krulevitz (Hungary) Balázs Taróczy
20 Sep	Arco Pacific Southwest Open; Los Angeles, United States; Carpet – $125,000 – 64S/32D; Four Star; Singles – Doubles	(United States) Brian Gottfried; 6–2, 6–2	(United States) Arthur Ashe	(Romania) Ilie Năstase (Mexico) Raúl Ramírez	(United States) Jimmy Connors (United States) Dick Stockton (United Kingdom) John Lloyd (United States) Sandy Mayer
20 Sep	Arco Pacific Southwest Open; Los Angeles, United States; Carpet – $125,000 – 64S/32D; Four Star; Singles – Doubles	(United States) Bob Lutz (United States) Stan Smith; 6–2, 3–6, 6–3	(United States) Arthur Ashe (United States) Charlie Pasarell	(Romania) Ilie Năstase (Mexico) Raúl Ramírez	(United States) Jimmy Connors (United States) Dick Stockton (United Kingdom) John Lloyd (United States) Sandy Mayer
27 Sep	Fireman's Fund International; San Francisco, United States; Carpet – $125,000 – 64S/32D; Four Star	(United States) Roscoe Tanner; 4–6, 7–5, 6–1	(United States) Brian Gottfried	(United States) Sherwood Stewart (United States) Dick Stockton	(United States) Harold Solomon (India) Vijay Amritraj (United States) Butch Walts (United States) Arthur Ashe
27 Sep	Fireman's Fund International; San Francisco, United States; Carpet – $125,000 – 64S/32D; Four Star	(United States) Dick Stockton (United States) Roscoe Tanner; 6–3, 6–4	(United States) Brian Gottfried (South Africa) Bob Hewitt	(United States) Sherwood Stewart (United States) Dick Stockton	(United States) Harold Solomon (India) Vijay Amritraj (United States) Butch Walts (United States) Arthur Ashe

=== October ===
Week	Tournament	Champions	Runners-up	Semifinalists	Quarterfinalists
4 Oct	Aryamehr Cup; Tehran, Iran; Clay – $150,000 – 64S/32D; Five Star	(Spain) Manuel Orantes; 7–6, 6–0, 2–6, 6–4	(Mexico) Raúl Ramírez	(Argentina) Guillermo Vilas (United States) Eddie Dibbs	(West Germany) Hans-Jürgen Pohmann (Italy) Paolo Bertolucci (Italy) Antonio Zugarelli (Poland) Wojciech Fibak
4 Oct	Aryamehr Cup; Tehran, Iran; Clay – $150,000 – 64S/32D; Five Star	(Poland) Wojciech Fibak (Mexico) Raúl Ramírez; 7–5, 6–1	(Spain) Juan Gisbert Sr. (Spain) Manuel Orantes	(Argentina) Guillermo Vilas (United States) Eddie Dibbs	(West Germany) Hans-Jürgen Pohmann (Italy) Paolo Bertolucci (Italy) Antonio Zugarelli (Poland) Wojciech Fibak
4 Oct	Island Holidays Classic; Maui, United States; Hard – $100,000 – 48S/24D; Three Star	(United States) Harold Solomon; 6–3, 5–7, 7–5	(United States) Bob Lutz	(United States) Marty Riessen (United States) Stan Smith	(United Kingdom) John Lloyd (Australia) John Newcombe (New Zealand) Brian Fairlie (United States) Arthur Ashe
4 Oct	Island Holidays Classic; Maui, United States; Hard – $100,000 – 48S/24D; Three Star	(South Africa) Raymond Moore (Australia) Allan Stone; 6–7, 6–3, 6–4	(United States) Dick Stockton (United States) Roscoe Tanner	(United States) Marty Riessen (United States) Stan Smith	(United Kingdom) John Lloyd (Australia) John Newcombe (New Zealand) Brian Fairlie (United States) Arthur Ashe
11 Oct	Trofeo Gillette; Madrid, Spain; Clay – 64S/32D; Three Star	(Spain) Manuel Orantes; 7–6, 6–2, 6–1	(United States) Eddie Dibbs	(Mexico) Raúl Ramírez (Poland) Wojciech Fibak	(Hungary) Balázs Taróczy (Czechoslovakia) Jan Kodeš (Chile) Jaime Fillol (South Africa) Bob Hewitt
11 Oct	Trofeo Gillette; Madrid, Spain; Clay – 64S/32D; Three Star	(Poland) Wojciech Fibak (Mexico) Raúl Ramírez; 4–6, 7–5, 6–3	(South Africa) Bob Hewitt (South Africa) Frew McMillan	(Mexico) Raúl Ramírez (Poland) Wojciech Fibak	(Hungary) Balázs Taróczy (Czechoslovakia) Jan Kodeš (Chile) Jaime Fillol (South Africa) Bob Hewitt
11 Oct	Air India/BP Tennis Classic; Brisbane, Australia; Grass – $50,000 – 32S/16D; One Star	(Australia) Mark Edmondson; 3–6, 6–4, 6–4, 6–4	(Australia) Phil Dent	(Australia) Allan Stone (United States) Tom Gorman	(Australia) Ray Ruffels (Australia) Kim Warwick (Australia) Dick Crealy (New Zealand) Brian Fairlie
11 Oct	Air India/BP Tennis Classic; Brisbane, Australia; Grass – $50,000 – 32S/16D; One Star	(Australia) Syd Ball (Australia) Kim Warwick; 6–4, 6–4	(Egypt) Ismail El Shafei (New Zealand) Brian Fairlie	(Australia) Allan Stone (United States) Tom Gorman	(Australia) Ray Ruffels (Australia) Kim Warwick (Australia) Dick Crealy (New Zealand) Brian Fairlie
18 Oct	CC Australian Indoor Championships; Sydney, Australia; Four Star; Hard (i) – $125,000 – 48S/24D; Singles – Doubles	(Australia) Geoff Masters; 4–6, 6–3, 7–6, 6–3	(United States) James Delaney	(Australia) Mark Edmondson (Australia) Dick Crealy	(Australia) Paul Kronk (India) Sashi Menon (United States) Bill Scanlon (Australia) Kim Warwick
18 Oct	CC Australian Indoor Championships; Sydney, Australia; Four Star; Hard (i) – $125,000 – 48S/24D; Singles – Doubles	(Egypt) Ismail El Shafei (New Zealand) Brian Fairlie; 4–6, 6–4, 7–6	(Australia) Syd Ball (Australia) Kim Warwick	(Australia) Mark Edmondson (Australia) Dick Crealy	(Australia) Paul Kronk (India) Sashi Menon (United States) Bill Scanlon (Australia) Kim Warwick
18 Oct	Trofeo Conde de Godó; Barcelona, Spain; Clay – $100,000 – 64S/32D; Three Star	(Spain) Manuel Orantes; 6–1, 2–6, 2–6, 7–5, 6–4	(United States) Eddie Dibbs	(Mexico) Raúl Ramírez (United States) Harold Solomon	(Czechoslovakia) Jan Kodeš (Socialist Federal Republic of Yugoslavia) Željko Franulović (United States) Brian Gottfried (Spain) Javier Soler
18 Oct	Trofeo Conde de Godó; Barcelona, Spain; Clay – $100,000 – 64S/32D; Three Star	(United States) Brian Gottfried (Mexico) Raúl Ramírez; 7–6, 6–4	(South Africa) Bob Hewitt (South Africa) Frew McMillan	(Mexico) Raúl Ramírez (United States) Harold Solomon	(Czechoslovakia) Jan Kodeš (Socialist Federal Republic of Yugoslavia) Željko Franulović (United States) Brian Gottfried (Spain) Javier Soler
25 Oct	Hitachi Tennis Classic; Perth, Australia; Hard – $50,000 – 32S/16D; One Star	(Australia) Ray Ruffels; 6–0, 4–6, 2–6, 6–3, 6–2	(Australia) Phil Dent	(United States) Roscoe Tanner (United States) Dick Stockton	(Australia) Dick Crealy (United States) Tim Gullikson (Australia) Syd Ball (United States) Gene Mayer
25 Oct	Hitachi Tennis Classic; Perth, Australia; Hard – $50,000 – 32S/16D; One Star	(United States) Dick Stockton (United States) Roscoe Tanner; 6–7, 6–1, 6–2	(Australia) Bob Carmichael (Egypt) Ismail El Shafei	(United States) Roscoe Tanner (United States) Dick Stockton	(Australia) Dick Crealy (United States) Tim Gullikson (Australia) Syd Ball (United States) Gene Mayer
25 Oct	Jean Becker Open; Paris, France; Hard (i) – $50,000 – 32S/16D; One Star; Singles – Doubles	(United States) Eddie Dibbs; 5–7, 6–4, 6–4, 7–6	(Chile) Jaime Fillol	(United Kingdom) Mark Cox (United States) Stan Smith	(United States) Erik van Dillen (Netherlands) Tom Okker (United States) Sherwood Stewart (Italy) Paolo Bertolucci
25 Oct	Jean Becker Open; Paris, France; Hard (i) – $50,000 – 32S/16D; One Star; Singles – Doubles	(Netherlands) Tom Okker (United States) Marty Riessen; 6–2, 6–2	(United States) Fred McNair (United States) Sherwood Stewart	(United Kingdom) Mark Cox (United States) Stan Smith	(United States) Erik van Dillen (Netherlands) Tom Okker (United States) Sherwood Stewart (Italy) Paolo Bertolucci
25 Oct	Fischer Grand Prix; Vienna, Austria; Hard (i) – $50,000 – 32S/16D; One Star; Singles – Doubles	(Poland) Wojciech Fibak; 6–7, 6–3, 6–4, 2–6, 6–1	(Mexico) Raúl Ramírez	(Sweden) Ove Bengtson (Paraguay) Víctor Pecci	(United States) Vitas Gerulaitis (United States) Arthur Ashe (United States) Brian Gottfried (Hungary) Balázs Taróczy
25 Oct	Fischer Grand Prix; Vienna, Austria; Hard (i) – $50,000 – 32S/16D; One Star; Singles – Doubles	(South Africa) Bob Hewitt (South Africa) Frew McMillan; 6–4, 4–0 RET.	(United States) Brian Gottfried (Mexico) Raúl Ramírez	(Sweden) Ove Bengtson (Paraguay) Víctor Pecci	(United States) Vitas Gerulaitis (United States) Arthur Ashe (United States) Brian Gottfried (Hungary) Balázs Taróczy

=== November ===
Week	Tournament	Champions	Runners-up	Semifinalists	Quarterfinalists
1 Nov	Dewar Cup; London, Great Britain; Carpet – $100,000 – 32S/16D; Three Star	(Mexico) Raúl Ramírez; 6–3, 6–4	(Spain) Manuel Orantes	(United Kingdom) Mark Cox (Chile) Jaime Fillol	(South Africa) Bernard Mitton (Italy) Antonio Zugarelli (United States) Arthur Ashe (Poland) Wojciech Fibak
1 Nov	Dewar Cup; London, Great Britain; Carpet – $100,000 – 32S/16D; Three Star	(United Kingdom) David Lloyd (United Kingdom) John Lloyd; 6–4, 3–6, 6–3	(United Kingdom) John Feaver (Australia) John James	(United Kingdom) Mark Cox (Chile) Jaime Fillol	(South Africa) Bernard Mitton (Italy) Antonio Zugarelli (United States) Arthur Ashe (Poland) Wojciech Fibak
1 Nov	Japan Open Tennis Championships; Tokyo, Japan; Clay – $100,000 – 48S/24D; Three Star	(United States) Roscoe Tanner; 6–3, 6–2	(Italy) Corrado Barazzutti	(United States) Dick Stockton (Australia) Ken Rosewall	(West Germany) Jürgen Fassbender (Australia) Dick Crealy (New Zealand) Brian Fairlie (United States) John Whitlinger
1 Nov	Japan Open Tennis Championships; Tokyo, Japan; Clay – $100,000 – 48S/24D; Three Star	(Australia) Bob Carmichael (Australia) Ken Rosewall; 6–4, 6–4	(Egypt) Ismail El Shafei (New Zealand) Brian Fairlie	(United States) Dick Stockton (Australia) Ken Rosewall	(West Germany) Jürgen Fassbender (Australia) Dick Crealy (New Zealand) Brian Fairlie (United States) John Whitlinger
1 Nov	Cologne Cup; Cologne, West Germany; Carpet – $50,000 – 32S/16D; One Star	(United States) Jimmy Connors; 6–2, 6–3	(South Africa) Frew McMillan	(United States) Brian Gottfried (Paraguay) Víctor Pecci	(Czechoslovakia) Jiří Hřebec (Czechoslovakia) František Pála (United States) Henry Bunis (United States) Harold Solomon
1 Nov	Cologne Cup; Cologne, West Germany; Carpet – $50,000 – 32S/16D; One Star	(South Africa) Bob Hewitt (South Africa) Frew McMillan; 6–1, 3–6, 7–6	(Rhodesia) Colin Dowdeswell (United States) Mike Estep	(United States) Brian Gottfried (Paraguay) Víctor Pecci	(Czechoslovakia) Jiří Hřebec (Czechoslovakia) František Pála (United States) Henry Bunis (United States) Harold Solomon
8 Nov	Stockholm Open; Stockholm, Sweden; Five Star; Hard (i) – $150,000 – 64S/32D; Singles – Doubles	(United Kingdom) Mark Cox; 4–6, 7–5, 7–6^{(7–3)}	(Spain) Manuel Orantes	(United States) Jimmy Connors (United States) Brian Gottfried	(Mexico) Raúl Ramírez (South Africa) Byron Bertram (Pakistan) Haroon Rahim (Sweden) Björn Borg
8 Nov	Stockholm Open; Stockholm, Sweden; Five Star; Hard (i) – $150,000 – 64S/32D; Singles – Doubles	(South Africa) Bob Hewitt (South Africa) Frew McMillan; 6–4, 4–6, 6–4	(Netherlands) Tom Okker (United States) Marty Riessen	(United States) Jimmy Connors (United States) Brian Gottfried	(Mexico) Raúl Ramírez (South Africa) Byron Bertram (Pakistan) Haroon Rahim (Sweden) Björn Borg
8 Nov	Citizen's Classic; Hong Kong, Hong Kong; Hard – $75,000 – 32S/16D; Two Star; Singles – Doubles	(Australia) Ken Rosewall; 1–6, 6–4, 7–6, 6–0	(Romania) Ilie Năstase	(United States) James Hagey (United States) Gene Mayer	(Mexico) Emilio Montaño (West Germany) Hans-Jürgen Pohmann (United States) Steve Krulevitz (Australia) Paul Kronk
8 Nov	Citizen's Classic; Hong Kong, Hong Kong; Hard – $75,000 – 32S/16D; Two Star; Singles – Doubles	(United States) Hank Pfister (United States) Butch Walts; 6–4, 6–2	(India) Anand Amritraj (Romania) Ilie Năstase	(United States) James Hagey (United States) Gene Mayer	(Mexico) Emilio Montaño (West Germany) Hans-Jürgen Pohmann (United States) Steve Krulevitz (Australia) Paul Kronk
15 Nov	Benson & Hedges Championships; London, Great Britain; Four Star; Carpet – $125,000 – 32S/16D	(United States) Jimmy Connors; 3–6, 7–6^{(8–6)}, 6–4	(United States) Roscoe Tanner	(United States) Brian Gottfried (Poland) Wojciech Fibak	(United States) Stan Smith (Mexico) Raúl Ramírez (Netherlands) Tom Okker (Romania) Ilie Năstase
15 Nov	Benson & Hedges Championships; London, Great Britain; Four Star; Carpet – $125,000 – 32S/16D	(United States) Stan Smith (United States) Roscoe Tanner; 7–6, 6–3	(Poland) Wojciech Fibak (United States) Brian Gottfried	(United States) Brian Gottfried (Poland) Wojciech Fibak	(United States) Stan Smith (Mexico) Raúl Ramírez (Netherlands) Tom Okker (Romania) Ilie Năstase
15 Nov	Philippine Open; Manila, the Philippines; Clay – $75,000 – 48S/24D; Two Star	(New Zealand) Brian Fairlie; 7–5, 6–7, 7–6	(Australia) Ray Ruffels	(Australia) Geoff Masters (Australia) Dick Crealy	(United States) Mike Machette (West Germany) Hans-Jürgen Pohmann (Australia) Mark Edmondson (Australia) Ross Case
15 Nov	Philippine Open; Manila, the Philippines; Clay – $75,000 – 48S/24D; Two Star	(Australia) Ross Case (Australia) Geoff Masters; 6–0, 6–1	(India) Anand Amritraj (Italy) Corrado Barazzutti	(Australia) Geoff Masters (Australia) Dick Crealy	(United States) Mike Machette (West Germany) Hans-Jürgen Pohmann (Australia) Mark Edmondson (Australia) Ross Case
15 Nov	Grand Prix Itaú; São Paulo, Brazil; Carpet – $50,000 – 32S/16D; One Star	(Argentina) Guillermo Vilas; 6–3, 6–0, ret.	(Spain) José Higueras	(Venezuela) Jorge Andrew (Brazil) Thomaz Koch	(Chile) Belus Prajoux (Paraguay) Víctor Pecci (Argentina) Ricardo Cano (Italy) Adriano Panatta
15 Nov	Grand Prix Itaú; São Paulo, Brazil; Carpet – $50,000 – 32S/16D; One Star	(Argentina) Lito Álvarez (Paraguay) Víctor Pecci; 6–4, 3–6, 6–3	(Argentina) Ricardo Cano (Chile) Belus Prajoux	(Venezuela) Jorge Andrew (Brazil) Thomaz Koch	(Chile) Belus Prajoux (Paraguay) Víctor Pecci (Argentina) Ricardo Cano (Italy) Adriano Panatta
22 Nov	South African Breweries Open; Johannesburg, South Africa; Hard – $150,000 – 48S/24D/16XD; Five Star	(United States) Harold Solomon; 6–2, 6–7, 6–3, 6–4	(United States) Brian Gottfried	(Mexico) Raúl Ramírez (United States) Stan Smith	(United States) Cliff Richey (South Africa) Raymond Moore (United States) Roscoe Tanner (South Africa) Willem Prinsloo
22 Nov	South African Breweries Open; Johannesburg, South Africa; Hard – $150,000 – 48S/24D/16XD; Five Star	(United States) Brian Gottfried (United States) Sherwood Stewart; 1–6, 6–1, 6–2, 7–6	(Spain) Juan Gisbert Sr. (United States) Stan Smith	(Mexico) Raúl Ramírez (United States) Stan Smith	(United States) Cliff Richey (South Africa) Raymond Moore (United States) Roscoe Tanner (South Africa) Willem Prinsloo
22 Nov	South African Breweries Open; Johannesburg, South Africa; Hard – $150,000 – 48S/24D/16XD; Five Star	(United States) Betsy Nagelsen (South Africa) Bob Hewitt; 6–2, 7–6	(South Africa) Annette du Plooy (South Africa) Deon Joubert	(Mexico) Raúl Ramírez (United States) Stan Smith	(United States) Cliff Richey (South Africa) Raymond Moore (United States) Roscoe Tanner (South Africa) Willem Prinsloo
22 Nov	South American Open; Buenos Aires, Argentina; Clay – $75,000 – 32S/16D; Two Star; Singles	(Argentina) Guillermo Vilas; 6–2, 6–2, 6–3	(Chile) Jaime Fillol	(Italy) Paolo Bertolucci (Brazil) Thomaz Koch	(Spain) José Higueras (Socialist Federal Republic of Yugoslavia) Željko Franulović (Paraguay) Víctor Pecci (Argentina) Ricardo Cano
22 Nov	South American Open; Buenos Aires, Argentina; Clay – $75,000 – 32S/16D; Two Star; Singles	(Brazil) Carlos Kirmayr (Argentina) Tito Vázquez; 6–4, 7–5	(Argentina) Ricardo Cano (Chile) Belus Prajoux	(Italy) Paolo Bertolucci (Brazil) Thomaz Koch	(Spain) José Higueras (Socialist Federal Republic of Yugoslavia) Željko Franulović (Paraguay) Víctor Pecci (Argentina) Ricardo Cano
22 Nov	Indian Grand Prix; Bangalore, India; Clay – $50,000 – 32S/16D; One Star	(Australia) Kim Warwick; 6–1, 6–2	(India) Sashi Menon	(Pakistan) Haroon Rahim (United States) Doug Crawford	(Australia) Bob Carmichael (Australia) Alvin Gardiner (United States) Mike Cahill (India) Ashok Amritraj
22 Nov	Indian Grand Prix; Bangalore, India; Clay – $50,000 – 32S/16D; One Star	(Australia) Bob Carmichael (Australia) Ray Ruffels; 6–2, 7–6	(India) Chiradip Mukerjea (India) Bhanu Nunna	(Pakistan) Haroon Rahim (United States) Doug Crawford	(Australia) Bob Carmichael (Australia) Alvin Gardiner (United States) Mike Cahill (India) Ashok Amritraj

=== December ===
Week	Tournament	Champions	Runners-up	Semifinalists	Quarterfinalists
6 Dec	Commercial Union Assurance Masters; Houston, United States; Carpet – $130,000 – 8S/4D; Singles – Doubles	(Spain) Manuel Orantes; 5–7, 6–2, 0–6, 7–6^{(7–1)}, 6–1	(Poland) Wojciech Fibak	(Argentina) Guillermo Vilas (United States) Harold Solomon	Round robin (United States) Brian Gottfried (Mexico) Raúl Ramírez (United States) Eddie Dibbs (United States) Roscoe Tanner
6 Dec	Commercial Union Assurance Masters; Houston, United States; Carpet – $130,000 – 8S/4D; Singles – Doubles	(United States) Fred McNair (United States) Sherwood Stewart; 6–3, 5–7, 5–7, 6–4, 6–4	(United States) Brian Gottfried (Mexico) Raúl Ramírez	(Argentina) Guillermo Vilas (United States) Harold Solomon	Round robin (United States) Brian Gottfried (Mexico) Raúl Ramírez (United States) Eddie Dibbs (United States) Roscoe Tanner

== Points system ==
The tournaments listed above were divided into six groups. Group TC consisted of the Triple Crown—the French Open, the Wimbledon Championships and the US Open—while the other tournaments were given star ratings ranging from five stars to one star, based on prize money and draw size. Points were allocated based on these ratings and the finishing position of a player in a tournament. No points were awarded to first-round losers, and ties were settled by the number of tournaments played. The points allocation, with doubles points listed in brackets, is as follows:

Group TC
- Champion: 160 (32)
- Runner-up: 120 (24)
- Semifinalist: 80 (16)
- Quarterfinalist: 40 (8)
- Fourth Round: 20 (4)
- Third Round: 10 (2)
- Second Round: 5

Five-star
- Champion: 120 (24)
- Runner-up: 90 (18)
- Semifinalist: 60 (12)
- Quarterfinalist: 30 (6)
- 9th – 16th: 15 (3)
- 17th – 32nd: 7
- 33rd – 64th: 1

Four-star
- Champion: 100 (20)
- Runner-up: 75 (15)
- Semifinalist: 50 (10)
- Quarterfinalist: 25 (5)
- 9th – 16th: 12 (2)
- 17th – 32nd: 6

Three-star
- Champion: 80 (16)
- Runner-up: 60 (12)
- Semifinalist: 40 (8)
- 5th – 8th: 20 (4)
- 9th – 16th: 10 (2)
- 17th – 32nd: 5

Two-star
- Champion: 60 (12)
- Runner-up: 45 (9)
- Semifinalist: 30 (6)
- 5th – 8th: 15 (3)
- 9th – 16th: 7 (1)
- 17th – 32nd: 3

One-star
- Champion: 40 (8)
- Runner-up: 30 (6)
- Semifinalist: 20 (4)
- 5th – 8th: 10 (2)
- 9th – 16th: 5

== Standings ==
The 1976 Grand Prix tournaments were divided in six separate point categories, ranging from the Triple Crown tournaments (150 points for the winner) to the smallest One Star tournaments (40 points for the winner). At the end of the year the 35 top-ranked players received a bonus from the bonus pool. To qualify for a bonus a player must have played a minimum amount of One and Two Star tournaments. The top eight points ranked singles players and top four doubles teams were entitled to participate in the season-ending Masters tournament.

Rk	Name	Points	Bonus
1	Raúl Ramírez (MEX)	938	$150,000
2	Manuel Orantes (ESP)	811	$90,000
3	Jimmy Connors (USA)	800	–
4	Eddie Dibbs (USA)	687	$60,000
5	Harold Solomon (USA)	681	$45,000
6	Guillermo Vilas (ARG)	627	$35,000
7	Roscoe Tanner (USA)	615	$30,000
8	Wojciech Fibak (POL)	582	$26,000
9	Brian Gottfried (USA)	574	$23,000
10	Björn Borg (SWE)	510	–

== ATP rankings ==
These are the ATP rankings of the top twenty singles players at the end of the 1975 season and at the end of the 1976 season, with numbers of ranking points, points averages, numbers of tournaments played, year-end rankings in 1976, highest and lowest positions during the season and number of spots gained or lost from the first rankings to the year-end rankings.

As of 15 December 1975
Rk	Name
1	Jimmy Connors (USA)
2	Guillermo Vilas (ARG)
3	Björn Borg (SWE)
4	Arthur Ashe (USA)
5	Manuel Orantes (ESP)
6	Ken Rosewall (AUS)
7	Ilie Năstase (ROU)
8	John Alexander (AUS)
9	Roscoe Tanner (USA)
10	Rod Laver (AUS)
11	Tom Okker (NED)
12	Tony Roche (AUS)
13	Raúl Ramírez (MEX)
14	Adriano Panatta (ITA)
15	Vitas Gerulaitis (USA)
16	Jaime Fillol (CHI)
17	Harold Solomon (USA)
18	Eddie Dibbs (USA)
19	Jan Kodeš (TCH)
20	John Newcombe (AUS)

Year-end rankings 1976 (12 December 1976)
Rk	Name	Points	Avg.	Change
1	Jimmy Connors (USA)	1,204	80.27	=
2	Björn Borg (SWE)	789	52.60	▲ +1
3	Ilie Năstase (ROU)	606	43.29	▲ +1
4	Manuel Orantes (ESP)	902	41.00	▲ +1
5	Raúl Ramírez (MEX)	1185	39.50	▲ +8
6	Guillermo Vilas (ARG)	813	38.71	▼ −4
7	Adriano Panatta (ITA)	447	31.93	▲ +7
8	Harold Solomon (USA)	893	30.79	▲ +9
9	Eddie Dibbs (USA)	920	30.67	▲ +9
10	Brian Gottfried (USA)	794	28.36	▲ +13
11	Roscoe Tanner (USA)	765	28.33	▼ −2
12	Arthur Ashe (USA)	575	26.14	▼ −8
13	Ken Rosewall (AUS)	341	24.36	▼ −7
14	Wojciech Fibak (POL)	754	23.56	▲ +44
15	Dick Stockton (USA)	513	20.52	▲ +15
16	Stan Smith (USA)	514	19.04	▲ +5
17	Mark Cox (GBR)	298	18.63	▲ +5
18	Vitas Gerulaitis (USA)	248	16.53	▼ −3
19	Jan Kodeš (TCH)	334	15.90	=
20	Robert Lutz (USA)	282	15.67	▲ +2

== List of tournament winners ==
The list of winners and number of Grand Prix singles titles won, alphabetically by last name:

- (Italy) Paolo Bertolucci (1) Barcelona
- (Sweden) Björn Borg (3) Düsseldorf, Wimbledon, Boston
- (United States) Jimmy Connors (6) Washington, North Conway, Indianapolis, US Open, Cologne, Wembley
- (United Kingdom) Mark Cox (1) Stockholm
- (United States) Eddie Dibbs (2) Hamburg, Paris (Jean Becker)
- (Australia) Mark Edmondson (1) Australian Open
- (Australia) Brian Fairlie (1) Manila
- (Poland) Wojciech Fibak (2) Bournemouth, Vienna
- (United States) Brian Gottfried (1) Los Angeles
- (Australia) Geoff Masters (1) Sydney Indoor
- (Romania) Ilie Năstase (1) South Orange
- (Spain) Manuel Orantes (5) Munich, Kitzbühel, Madrid, Barcelona, Masters
- (Italy) Adriano Panatta (2) Rome, French Open
- (Paraguay) Víctor Pecci (2) Madrid, Berlin
- (Mexico) Raúl Ramírez (2) Gstaad, London III
- (United States) Cliff Richey (1) Bermuda
- (Australia) Ken Rosewall (1) Hong Kong
- (Australia) Ray Ruffels (1) Perth
- (United States) Harold Solomon (2) Maui, Johannesburg
- (United States) Roscoe Tanner (4) Cincinnati, Columbus, San Francisco, Tokyo Outdoor
- (Hungary) Balázs Taróczy (1) Hilversum
- (Argentina) Guillermo Vilas (3) Montreal, São Paulo. Buenos Aires
- (Australia) Kim Warwick (1) Bangalore
- (Italy) Antonio Zugarelli (1) Båstad

The following players won their first Grand Prix title in 1976:

- (Australia) Mark Edmondson Australian Open
- (Poland) Wojciech Fibak Bournemouth
- (Australia) Geoff Masters Sydney Indoor
- (Paraguay) Víctor Pecci Madrid
- (Australia) Kim Warwick Bangalore
- (Italy) Antonio Zugarelli Båstad

== See also ==
- 1976 World Championship Tennis circuit
- 1976 WTA Tour
