= 1976 Custom Credit Australian Indoor Championships – Doubles =

Doubles
- 1976 Custom Credit Australian Indoor Championships

Final
- Champions: (Egypt) Ismail El Shafei (New Zealand) Brian Fairlie
- Runners-up: (Australia) Syd Ball (Australia) Kim Warwick
- Score: 4–6, 6–4, 7–6

Events
Singles	Doubles
← 1975 ·	Custom Credit Australian Indoor Championships	· 1977 →

Brian Gottfried and Raúl Ramírez were the defending champions but did not compete that year.

Ismail El Shafei and Brian Fairlie won in the final 4–6, 6–4, 7–6 against Syd Ball and Kim Warwick.

== Seeds ==
1. (Australia) Ross Case / (Australia) Geoff Masters (first round)
2. (Australia) Ray Ruffels / (Australia) Allan Stone (semifinals)

== Draw ==
=== Key ===
- Q = Qualifier
- WC = Wild card
- LL = Lucky loser
- Alt = Alternate
- SE = Special exempt
- PR = Protected ranking
- ITF = ITF entry
- JE = Junior exempt
- w/o = Walkover
- r = Retired
- d = Defaulted
- SR = Special ranking

=== Finals ===
Semifinals
(Australia) Syd Ball (Australia) Kim Warwick	DEF
(Australia) Mark Edmondson (Australia) John Marks
(Egypt) Ismail El Shafei (New Zealand) Brian Fairlie	7	6
2	(Australia) Ray Ruffels (Australia) Allan Stone	5	4

Final
(Australia) Syd Ball (Australia) Kim Warwick	6	4	6
(Egypt) Ismail El Shafei (New Zealand) Brian Fairlie	4	6	7

=== Top half ===
First round
1	(Australia) R Case (Australia) G Masters
(Australia) S Ball (Australia) K Warwick	DEF
(United States) H Pfister (United States) B Walts	DEF
(Australia) J Bartlett (Australia) A Gardiner
(Australia) M Edmondson (Australia) J Marks	[8]
(West Germany) F Gebert (United States) B Scanlon	[5]
(United States) Tim Gullikson (United States) Tom Gullikson	[8]
(Australia) J Newcombe (Australia) K Rosewall	[9]

Second round
(Australia) S Ball (Australia) K Warwick	[8]
(Australia) D Crealy (Australia) C Kachel	[6]
(United States) G Mayer (Australia) J Trickey
(United States) H Pfister (United States) B Walts	DEF
(Australia) B Drewett (Australia) R Kelly	[4]
(Australia) M Edmondson (Australia) J Marks	[8]
(United States) J C Hagey (Australia) P McNamee	[8]
(Australia) J Newcombe (Australia) K Rosewall	[9]

Quarterfinals
(Australia) S Ball (Australia) K Warwick	[8]
(United States) H Pfister (United States) B Walts	[3]
(Australia) M Edmondson (Australia) J Marks	[8]
(Australia) J Newcombe (Australia) K Rosewall	[4]

Semifinals
(Australia) S Ball (Australia) K Warwick	DEF
(Australia) M Edmondson (Australia) J Marks

=== Bottom half ===
First round
(Australia) B Carmichael (Australia) P Dent	[4]
(Australia) R Reid (Netherlands) R Thung	[8]
(United States) J Delaney (United States) B Martin	[6]
(United States) E Friedler (United States) J Karzen	[8]
(Australia) S Docherty (Australia) E Ewert	[5]
(India) S Menon (United States) J Whitlinger	[8]
(Australia) P McNamara (United States) T Waltke	[6]
(New Zealand) C Lewis (New Zealand) R Simpson	[8]

Second round
(Australia) R Reid (Netherlands) R Thung	[2]
(Egypt) I El Shafei (New Zealand) B Fairlie	[8]
(United States) E Friedler (United States) J Karzen	[2]
(United States) D Stockton (United States) R Tanner	[8]
(Australia) P Kronk (Australia) C Letcher	[9]
(India) S Menon (United States) J Whitlinger	[8]
(New Zealand) C Lewis (New Zealand) R Simpson	[1]
2	(Australia) R Ruffels (Australia) A Stone	[8]

Quarterfinals
(Egypt) I El Shafei (New Zealand) B Fairlie	[9]
(United States) D Stockton (United States) R Tanner	[8]
(Australia) P Kronk (Australia) C Letcher	[2]
2	(Australia) R Ruffels (Australia) A Stone	[8]

Semifinals
(Egypt) I El Shafei (New Zealand) B Fairlie	7	6
2	(Australia) R Ruffels (Australia) A Stone	5	4
