= 1976 Citizen's Classic – Singles =

Singles
- 1976 Citizen's Classic

Final
- Champion: (Australia) Ken Rosewall
- Runner-up: (Romania) Ilie Năstase
- Score: 1–6, 6–4, 7–6, 6–0

Details
- Draw: 48
- Seeds: 8

Events
Singles	Doubles
- Hong Kong Open

The 1976 Citizen's Classic – Singles was an event of the 1976 Citizen's Classic tennis tournament and was played on outdoor hard courts in Hong Kong, between 8 November and 14 November 1976. The draw comprised 48 players and 8 of them were seeded. Tom Gorman was the defending Hong Kong Open singles champion but lost in the third round to Gene Mayer. Fourth-seeded Ken Rosewall won the singles title after a victory in the final against first-seeded Ilie Năstase, 1–6, 6–4, 7–6, 6–0.

== Seeds ==
1. (Romania) Ilie Năstase (final)
2. (United States) Roscoe Tanner (first round)
3. (Italy) Corrado Barazzutti (second round)
4. (Australia) Ken Rosewall (champion)
5. (West Germany) Hans-Jürgen Pohmann (quarterfinals)
6. (United States) Billy Martin (second round)
7. (United States) Tom Gullikson (first round)
8. (New Zealand) Brian Fairlie (second round)

Click on the seed number of a player to go to their draw section.

== Draw ==
Key

- Q = Qualifier
- WC = Wild card
- LL = Lucky loser
- Alt = Alternate
- ITF = ITF entry
- PR = Protected ranking
- SR = Special ranking
- SE = Special exempt
- JE = Junior exempt
- JR = Junior Accelerator Programme entrant
- CO = College Accelerator Programme entrant
- NG = Next Gen Accelerator Program entrant
- w/o = Walkover
- r = Retired
- d = Defaulted

=== Finals ===
Quarterfinals
1	(Romania) Ilie Năstase	6	6
(Mexico) Emilio Montaño	1	1
(United States) Chico Hagey	7	6
5	(West Germany) Hans-Jürgen Pohmann	6	3
(United States) Steve Krulevitz	3	3
4	(Australia) Ken Rosewall	6	6
(United States) Gene Mayer	6	6
(Australia) Paul Kronk	3	1

Semifinals
1	(Romania) Ilie Năstase	6	6
(United States) Chico Hagey	1	1
4	(Australia) Ken Rosewall	6	6
(United States) Gene Mayer	3	2

Final
1	(Romania) Ilie Năstase	6	4	6
4	(Australia) Ken Rosewall	1	6	7

=== Top half ===
==== Section 1 ====
First Round
1	(Romania) Ilie Năstase	7	6
(United States) Mike Cahill	5	1
(United States) John Whitlinger	2	6	6
(United States) Raz Reid	6	4	4
8	(New Zealand) Brian Fairlie	2	6	6
(Egypt) Ismail El Shafei	6	3	4
(Mexico) Emilio Montaño	6	7
(United States) Timothy Noonan	3	5

Second Round
1	(Romania) Ilie Năstase	7	6
(United States) Butch Walts	6	2
(United States) John Whitlinger	2	4
(India) Sashi Menon	6	6
8	(New Zealand) Brian Fairlie	2	5
(United States) Mike MacHette	6	7
(Mexico) Emilio Montaño	4	7	6
(India) Anand Amritraj	6	5	1

Third Round
1	(Romania) Ilie Năstase	6	6
(India) Sashi Menon	0	2
(United States) Mike MacHette	5	6	7
(Mexico) Emilio Montaño	7	4	9

Quarterfinals
1	(Romania) Ilie Năstase	6	6
(Mexico) Emilio Montaño	1	1

==== Section 2 ====
First Round
3	(Italy) Corrado Barazzutti	6	6
(United States) George Hardie	1	4
(United States) Chico Hagey	6	2	7
(United States) Eric Friedler	2	6	5
5	(West Germany) Hans-Jürgen Pohmann	6	6
Q	(United States) Doug Crawford	3	2
(United States) Tim Gullikson	2	6	6
Q	(France) Jacques Thamin	6	4	2

Second Round
3	(Italy) Corrado Barazzutti	1	3
(United States) Hank Pfister	6	6
(Australia) Bob Carmichael	2	1^{r}
(United States) Chico Hagey	6	1
5	(West Germany) Hans-Jürgen Pohmann	7	7
(Australia) John Bartlett	6	5
(United States) Tim Gullikson	6	6
Q	(Hong Kong) Randall King	4	1

Third Round
(United States) Hank Pfister	6	1	3
(United States) Chico Hagey	2	6	6
5	(West Germany) Hans-Jürgen Pohmann	6	6
(United States) Tim Gullikson	0	1

Quarterfinals
(United States) Chico Hagey	7	6
5	(West Germany) Hans-Jürgen Pohmann	6	3

=== Bottom half ===
==== Section 3 ====
First Round
(United States) Steve Krulevitz	1	6	8
(Australia) Ray Ruffels	6	3	6
(New Zealand) Russell Simpson	6	6
(Australia) David Epstein	1	4
(West Germany) Jürgen Fassbender	3	0
(Australia) Geoff Masters	6	6
(West Germany) Hans-Joachim Plötz	1	2
4	(Australia) Ken Rosewall	6	6

Second Round
(Australia) Kim Warwick	0	1^{r}
(United States) Steve Krulevitz	6	2
(New Zealand) Russell Simpson	6	6
6	(United States) Billy Martin	4	2
(Australia) Geoff Masters	6	7
(Mexico) Marcello Lara	2	5
(Australia) Paul McNamee	4	1
4	(Australia) Ken Rosewall	6	6

Third Round
(United States) Steve Krulevitz	7	6
(New Zealand) Russell Simpson	6	3
(Australia) Geoff Masters	3	1
4	(Australia) Ken Rosewall	6	6

Quarterfinals
(United States) Steve Krulevitz	3	3
4	(Australia) Ken Rosewall	6	6

==== Section 4 ====
First Round
(Australia) Alvin Gardiner	3	2
(United States) Gene Mayer	6	6
(United States) Jim Delaney	6	6
7	(United States) Tom Gullikson	0	3
(Australia) Cliff Letcher	6	6
(United States) Rick Fisher	3	4
(Australia) John Marks	6	6
2	(United States) Roscoe Tanner	3	4

Second Round
(United States) Gene Mayer	6	5	6
(Australia) Chris Kachel	3	7	3
(United States) Jim Delaney	6	5
(United States) Tom Gorman	7	7
(Netherlands) Rolf Thung	6	3	6
(Australia) Cliff Letcher	4	6	3
(Australia) Paul Kronk	6	6
(Australia) John Marks	3	4

Third Round
(United States) Gene Mayer	6	3	6
(United States) Tom Gorman	4	6	1
(Netherlands) Rolf Thung
(Australia) Paul Kronk	w/o

Quarterfinals
(United States) Gene Mayer	6	6
(Australia) Paul Kronk	3	1
