= 1976 Custom Credit Australian Indoor Championships – Singles =

Singles
- 1976 Custom Credit Australian Indoor Championships

Final
- Champion: (Australia) Geoff Masters
- Runner-up: (United States) James Delaney
- Score: 4–6, 6–3, 7–6, 6–3

Details
- Draw: 64 (6 Q )
- Seeds: 8

Events
Singles	Doubles
← 1975 ·	Australian Indoor Tennis Championships	· 1977 →

Stan Smith was the defending champion of the men's singles event at the Australian Indoor Championships but did not compete that year.

Unseeded Geoff Masters won in the final 4–6, 6–3, 7–6, 6–3 against James Delaney.

== Seeds ==
1. (United States) Roscoe Tanner (second round)
2. (Australia) Ken Rosewall (second round)
3. (United States) Dick Stockton (second round)
4. (Australia) John Newcombe (second round)
5. (Australia) Ross Case (second round)
6. (United States) Sandy Mayer (withdrew)
7. (Australia) Phil Dent (second round)
8. (United States) Tom Gorman (third round)

Tanner, Rosewall and Dent received a bye to the second round. Tony Roche was originally seeded fifth but was forced to withdraw before the start of the tournament due to a stomach muscle injury.

== Draw ==
=== Key ===
- Q = Qualifier
- WC = Wild card
- LL = Lucky loser
- Alt = Alternate
- SE = Special exempt
- PR = Protected ranking
- ITF = ITF entry
- JE = Junior exempt
- w/o = Walkover
- r = Retired
- d = Defaulted
- SR = Special ranking

=== Finals ===
Semifinals
(United States) James Delaney	2	6	6
(Australia) Mark Edmondson	6	3	3
(Australia) Dick Crealy	2	7	2
(Australia) Geoff Masters	6	5	6

Final
(United States) James Delaney	6	3	6	3
(Australia) Geoff Masters	4	6	7	6

=== Top half ===
==== Section 1 ====
First round
(Australia) P Kronk	7	6
(New Zealand) R Simpson	5	3
(Australia) P McNamee	6	3
(Australia) C Kachel	7	6
(United States) G Mayer	6	6
(Netherlands) R Thung	3	4
(United States) J Delaney	6	6
(West Germany) F Gebert	0	3

Second round
2	(Australia) K Rosewall	4	4
(Australia) P Kronk	6	6
(Australia) C Kachel	6	6
(Australia) G Braun	3	2
8	(United States) T Gorman	3	6	7
(United States) G Mayer	6	2	6
(United States) J Delaney	2
(Australia) S Docherty	1^{r}

Third round
(Australia) P Kronk	6	6
(Australia) C Kachel	2	2
(United States) T Gorman	7	2	3
(United States) J Delaney	6	6	6

Quarterfinals
(Australia) P Kronk	1	3
(United States) J Delaney	6	6

==== Section 2 ====
First round
4	(Australia) J Newcombe	6	5	4
(Australia) R Ruffels	3	7	6
(Australia) A Stone	6	4
(New Zealand) B Fairlie	7	6
5	(Australia) R Case	4	6
(Australia) M Edmondson	6	7
(Australia) J Marks	2	3
(New Zealand) C Lewis	6	6

Second round
(Australia) R Reid	2	4
(Australia) R Ruffels	6	6
(New Zealand) B Fairlie	4	3
(India) S Menon	6	6
(United States) Tim Gullikson	1	2
(Australia) M Edmondson	6	6
(New Zealand) C Lewis	6	3	5
(United States) J C Hagey	2	6	7

Third round
(Australia) R Ruffels	4	4
(India) S Menon	6	6
(Australia) M Edmondson	6	2	6
(United States) J C Hagey	4	6	4

Quarterfinals
(India) S Menon	4	4
(Australia) M Edmondson	6	6

=== Bottom half ===
==== Section 3 ====
First round
(Australia) J Bartlett	3	4
(Australia) D Crealy	6	6
(Australia) J Trickey	4	3
(United States) T Waltke	6	6
(United States) Tom Gullikson	6	6
(Australia) A Gardiner	3	2
(Australia) S Ball	6	6
3	(United States) D Stockton	0	4

Second round
(Australia) B Carmichael	3	3
(Australia) D Crealy	6	6
(United States) T Waltke	6	6
(Australia) P McNamara	3	3
(United States) H Pfister	3	6	6
(United States) Tom Gullikson	6	2	3
(Australia) S Ball	7	3	4
(United States) B Scanlon	6	6	6

Third round
(Australia) D Crealy	4	7	6
(United States) T Waltke	6	5	3
(United States) H Pfister	3	3
(United States) B Scanlon	6	6

Quarterfinals
(Australia) D Crealy	6	1	6
(United States) B Scanlon	3	6	4

==== Section 4 ====
First round
(Australia) R Kelly	0	2
(United States) J Whitlinger	6	6
(United States) E Friedler	3	4
(United States) B Walts	6	6
(Australia) B Drewett	5	6	0
(Australia) C Letcher	7	4	6
(United States) B Martin	0	3
(Australia) K Warwick	6	6

Second round
(Australia) G Masters	7	7
(United States) J Whitlinger	6	5
(United States) B Walts	7	2	6
7	(Australia) P Dent	6	6	3
(Egypt) I El Shafei	6	6	3
(Australia) C Letcher	2	7	6
(Australia) K Warwick	7	3	6
1	(United States) R Tanner	6	6	0

Third round
(Australia) G Masters	6	6
(United States) B Walts	3	1
(Australia) C Letcher	4	3
(Australia) K Warwick	6	6

Quarterfinals
(Australia) G Masters	7	6
(Australia) K Warwick	6	1
