= 1976 Citizen's Classic – Doubles =

Tennis tournament event

Doubles
- 1976 Citizen's Classic

Final
- Champion: (United States) Hank Pfister (United States) Butch Walts
- Runner-up: (India) Anand Amritraj (Romania) Ilie Năstase
- Score: 6–4, 6–2

Details
- Draw: 24
- Seeds: 4

Events
Singles	Doubles
- Hong Kong Open

The 1976 Citizen's Classic – Doubles was an event of the 1976 Citizen's Classic tennis tournament, also known as the Hong Kong Open, and was played on outdoor hard courts in Hong Kong, between 7 November and 13 November 1976. The draw comprised 24 teams and four of them were seeded. Tom Okker and Ken Rosewall were the defending Hong Kong Open doubles champions but did not participate in this edition. The unseeded team of Hank Pfister and Butch Walts won the doubles title by defeating the second-seeded pairing Anand Amritraj and Ilie Năstase in the final, 6–4, 6–2.

== Seeds ==
1. (West Germany) Jürgen Fassbender / (West Germany) Hans-Jürgen Pohmann (Quarterfinals)
2. (India) Anand Amritraj / (Romania) Ilie Năstase (Final)
3. (Australia) Geoff Masters / (Australia) Kim Warwick (Second round)
4. (Egypt) Ismail El Shafei / (New Zealand) Brian Fairlie (Semifinals)

== Draw ==
Key

- Q = Qualifier
- WC = Wild card
- LL = Lucky loser
- Alt = Alternate
- ITF = ITF entry
- PR = Protected ranking
- SR = Special ranking
- SE = Special exempt
- JE = Junior exempt
- JR = Junior Accelerator Programme entrant
- CO = College Accelerator Programme entrant
- NG = Next Gen Accelerator Program entrant
- w/o = Walkover
- r = Retired
- d = Defaulted

=== Finals ===
Semifinals
(United States) Hank Pfister (United States) Butch Walts	5	1	8
4	(Egypt) Ismail El Shafei (New Zealand) Brian Fairlie	7	6	6
(Australia) Paul Kronk (Australia) Cliff Letcher	4	7	4
2	(India) Anand Amritraj (Romania) Ilie Năstase	6	6	6

Final
(United States) Hank Pfister (United States) Butch Walts	6	6
2	(India) Anand Amritraj (Romania) Ilie Năstase	4	2

=== Top half ===
First Round
1	(West Germany) Jürgen Fassbender (West Germany) Hans-Jürgen Pohmann	6	6
(India) Bhanu Nunna (France) Jacques Thamin	2	2
(United States) Steve Mott (United States) Timothy Noonan	6	6
(United States) David Eddy (Australia) David Epstein	3	3
(Australia) Ken Rosewall (Australia) Ray Ruffels	6	6
(United States) Rick Fisher (West Germany) Hans-Joachim Plötz	2	4
(United States) Mike Cahill (United States) John Whitlinger	6	6
(Australia) Chris Kachel (Australia) John Marks	3	3

Second Round
1	(West Germany) Jürgen Fassbender (West Germany) Hans-Jürgen Pohmann	6	7
(United States) Jim Delaney (United States) Billy Martin	3	6
(United States) Hank Pfister (United States) Butch Walts	6	7
(United States) Steve Mott (United States) Timothy Noonan	2	5
4	(Egypt) Ismail El Shafei (New Zealand) Brian Fairlie	7	7
(Australia) Ken Rosewall (Australia) Ray Ruffels	6	6

Quarterfinals
1	(West Germany) Jürgen Fassbender (West Germany) Hans-Jürgen Pohmann	5	2
(United States) Hank Pfister (United States) Butch Walts	7	6
4	(Egypt) Ismail El Shafei (New Zealand) Brian Fairlie	7	7
(United States) Mike Cahill (United States) John Whitlinger	6	5

Semifinals
(United States) Hank Pfister (United States) Butch Walts	5	1	8
4	(Egypt) Ismail El Shafei (New Zealand) Brian Fairlie	7	6	6

=== Bottom half ===
First Round
(India) Sashi Menon (United States) Mike MacHette	3	7	6
(Australia) Ernie Ewert (Australia) Paul McNamee	6	6	4
(United States) Eric Friedler (United States) Jerry Karzen	3	6	2
(Australia) Paul Kronk (Australia) Cliff Letcher	6	2	6
(United States) Raz Reid (Netherlands) Rolf Thung	6	6
(Australia) Alvin Gardiner (United States) George Hardie	4	3
(Australia) John Bartlett (New Zealand) Russell Simpson	7	1	6
(Italy) Corrado Barazzutti (United States) Steve Krulevitz	5	6	8

Second Round
(India) Sashi Menon (United States) Mike MacHette	1	7	2
(United States) Chico Hagey (United States) Gene Mayer	6	6	6
(Australia) Paul Kronk (Australia) Cliff Letcher	7	5	6
3	(Australia) Geoff Masters (Australia) Kim Warwick	5	7	2
(Mexico) Marcello Lara (Mexico) Emilio Montaño	1	6	6
(United States) Raz Reid (Netherlands) Rolf Thung	6	3	4
(Italy) Corrado Barazzutti (United States) Steve Krulevitz	7	6	3
2	(India) Anand Amritraj (Romania) Ilie Năstase	5	7	6

Quarterfinals
(United States) Chico Hagey (United States) Gene Mayer	5	5
(Australia) Paul Kronk (Australia) Cliff Letcher	7	7
(Mexico) Marcello Lara (Mexico) Emilio Montaño	3	2
2	(India) Anand Amritraj (Romania) Ilie Năstase	6	6

Semifinals
(Australia) Paul Kronk (Australia) Cliff Letcher	4	7	4
2	(India) Anand Amritraj (Romania) Ilie Năstase	6	6	6
