= 1974 Stadthalle Open – Doubles =

Doubles
- 1974 Stadthalle Open

Final
- Champions: (South Africa) Raymond Moore (Rhodesia) Andrew Pattison
- Runners-up: (South Africa) Bob Hewitt (South Africa) Frew McMillan
- Score: 6–4, 5–7, 6–4

Details
- Draw: 16
- Seeds: 4

Events
Singles	Doubles
Vienna Open	· 1976 →

Raymond Moore and Andrew Pattison won in the final 6–4, 5–7, 6–4 against Bob Hewitt and Frew McMillan.

== Seeds ==
1. (South Africa) Bob Hewitt / (South Africa) Frew McMillan (final)
2. (Colombia) Iván Molina / (Colombia) Jairo Velasco, Sr. (first round)
3. (United States) Vitas Gerulaitis / (United States) Tom Gorman (quarterfinals)
4. (South Africa) Raymond Moore / (Rhodesia) Andrew Pattison (champions)

== Draw ==
=== Key ===
- Q = Qualifier
- WC = Wild card
- LL = Lucky loser
- Alt = Alternate
- SE = Special exempt
- PR = Protected ranking
- ITF = ITF entry
- JE = Junior exempt
- w/o = Walkover
- r = Retired
- d = Defaulted
- SR = Special ranking

First round
1	(South Africa) B Hewitt (South Africa) F McMillan	6	1	6
(India) S Menon (India) J Singh	0	6	3
(West Germany) K Meiler (Pakistan) H Rahim	5	6
(Australia) R Keldie (Mexico) J Loyo-Mayo	7	7
3	(United States) V Gerulaitis (United States) T Gorman	7	6
(Czechoslovakia) J Písecký (Austria) P Pokorny	5	3
(United States) R Fisher (Socialist Federal Republic of Yugoslavia) N Špear	4	4
(Czechoslovakia) M Holeček (Austria) H Kary	6	6
(United Kingdom) G Battrick (United Kingdom) G Stilwell	6	6	4
(Sweden) O Bengtson (Sweden) J-E Lundqvist	4	7	6
(Poland) W Fibak (Czechoslovakia) F Pála	6	0	4
4	(South Africa) R Moore (Rhodesia) A Pattison	3	6	6
(Hungary) R Machán (Hungary) G Varga	1	6	6
(Romania) I Țiriac (Austria) I Wimmer	6	3	8
(Hungary) J Benyik (Hungary) B Taróczy	6	7
2	(Colombia) I Molina (Colombia) J Velasco, Sr.	3	6

Quarterfinals
1	(South Africa) B Hewitt (South Africa) F McMillan	6	6	6
(Australia) R Keldie (Mexico) J Loyo-Mayo	1	7	2
3	(United States) V Gerulaitis (United States) T Gorman	5	4
(Czechoslovakia) M Holeček (Austria) H Kary	7	6
(Sweden) O Bengtson (Sweden) J-E Lundqvist	6	6	1
4	(South Africa) R Moore (Rhodesia) A Pattison	4	7	6
(Romania) I Țiriac (Austria) I Wimmer	7	6
(Hungary) J Benyik (Hungary) B Taróczy	6	4

Semifinals
1	(South Africa) B Hewitt (South Africa) F McMillan	3	7	6
(Czechoslovakia) M Holeček (Austria) H Kary	6	5	1
4	(South Africa) R Moore (Rhodesia) A Pattison	3	6	6
(Romania) I Țiriac (Austria) I Wimmer	6	3	4

Final
1	(South Africa) B Hewitt (South Africa) F McMillan	4	7	4
4	(South Africa) R Moore (Rhodesia) A Pattison	6	5	6
