= 1976 Citizen's Classic =

Tennis tournament

- Date: 8–14 November
- Edition: 4th
- Category: Grand Prix (Two Star)
- Draw: 48S / 16D
- Prize money: $75,000
- Surface: Hard / outdoor
- Location: Hong Kong

Champions

Singles
- (Australia) Ken Rosewall

Doubles
- (United States) Hank Pfister / (United States) Butch Walts
- Hong Kong Open

The 1976 Citizen's Classic, also known as the Hong Kong Open, was a men's tennis tournament played on outdoor hard courts in Hong Kong. It was the fourth edition of the event and was held from 8 November through 14 November 1976. The tournament was part of the Two Star tier of the 1976 Grand Prix tennis circuit. Fourth-seeded Ken Rosewall won the singles title.

== Finals ==
=== Singles ===
(Australia) Ken Rosewall defeated (Romania) Ilie Năstase 1–6, 6–4, 7–6, 6–0

- It was Rosewall's 3rd singles title of the year and the 41st of his career in the Open Era.

=== Doubles ===
(United States) Hank Pfister / (United States) Butch Walts defeated (India) Anand Amritraj / (Romania) Ilie Năstase 6–4, 6–2
