= 1974 Stadthalle Open =

- Date: 28 October – 3 November
- Edition: 1st
- Category: Grand Prix
- Draw: 32S / 16D
- Surface: Hard / Indoor
- Location: Vienna, Austria
- Venue: Wiener Stadthalle

Champions

Singles
- (United States) Vitas Gerulaitis

Doubles
- (South Africa) Raymond Moore / (Rhodesia) Andrew Pattison
Vienna Open	· 1976 →

The 1974 Stadthalle Open was a men's tennis tournament played on indoor hard courts at the Wiener Stadthalle in Vienna in Austria that was part of the 1974 Commercial Union Assurance Grand Prix. It was the inaugural edition of the tournament and was held from 28 October through 3 November 1974. Unseeded Vitas Gerulaitis won the singles title.

== Finals ==
=== Singles ===
(United States) Vitas Gerulaitis defeated (Rhodesia) Andrew Pattison 6–4, 3–6, 6–3, 6–2

- It was Gerulaitis' 3rd title of the year and the 3rd of his career.

=== Doubles ===
(South Africa) Raymond Moore / (Rhodesia) Andrew Pattison defeated (South Africa) Bob Hewitt / (South Africa) Frew McMillan 6–4, 5–7, 6–4

- It was Moore's 2nd title of the year and the 2nd of his career. It was Pattison's 3rd title of the year and the 4th of his career.
