= 1977 Custom Credit Australian Indoor Championships – Doubles =

Doubles
- 1977 Custom Credit Australian Indoor Championships

Final
- Champions: (Australia) John Newcombe (Australia) Tony Roche
- Runners-up: (Australia) Ross Case (Australia) Geoff Masters
- Score: 6–7, 6–3, 6–1

Details
- Draw: 16
- Seeds: 4

Events
Singles	Doubles
- Custom Credit Australian Indoor Championships

Ismail El Shafei and Brian Fairlie were the defending champions but only Fairlie competed that year with Russell Simpson.

Fairlie and Simpson lost in the first round to Mark Edmondson and John Marks.

John Newcombe and Tony Roche won in the final 6–7, 6–3, 6–1 against Ross Case and Geoff Masters.

== Seeds ==
1. (Australia) Syd Ball / (Australia) Kim Warwick (first round)
2. (Australia) Ross Case / (Australia) Geoff Masters (final)
3. (West Germany) Jürgen Fassbender / (West Germany) Karl Meiler (semifinals)
4. (Australia) Bob Carmichael / (Australia) Ken Rosewall (first round)

== Draw ==
Key

- Q = Qualifier
- WC = Wild card
- LL = Lucky loser
- Alt = Alternate
- ITF = ITF entry
- PR = Protected ranking
- SR = Special ranking
- SE = Special exempt
- JE = Junior exempt
- JR = Junior Accelerator Programme entrant
- CO = College Accelerator Programme entrant
- NG = Next Gen Accelerator Program entrant
- w/o = Walkover
- r = Retired
- d = Defaulted

First round
1	(Australia) S Ball (Australia) K Warwick	3	3
(Australia) J Newcombe (Australia) T Roche	6	6
(Australia) M Edmondson (Australia) J Marks	6	6	6
(New Zealand) B Fairlie (New Zealand) R Simpson	4	7	4
3	(West Germany) J Fassbender (West Germany) K Meiler	6	6
(Australia) D Crealy (Australia) P Dent	4	1
(Australia) C Dibley (Australia) C Kachel	6	4
(Australia) P Kronk (Australia) C Letcher	7	6
(United States) S Krulevitz (United States) H Solomon	d
(Australia) R Ruffels (Australia) A Stone
(United States) H Pfister (United States) B Walts	7	6	6
4	(Australia) B Carmichael (Australia) K Rosewall	6	7	2
(United States) N Saviano (United States) J Whitlinger	4	2
(Mexico) M Lara (India) S Menon	6	6
(United States) V Gerulaitis (United States) B Scanlon	3	7	4
2	(Australia) R Case (Australia) G Masters	6	5	6

Quarterfinals
(Australia) J Newcombe (Australia) T Roche	7	6
(Australia) M Edmondson (Australia) J Marks	6	3
3	(West Germany) J Fassbender (West Germany) K Meiler	7	5	6
(Australia) P Kronk (Australia) C Letcher	5	7	3
(Australia) R Ruffels (Australia) A Stone	3	4
(United States) H Pfister (United States) B Walts	6	6
(Mexico) M Lara (India) S Menon	2	1
2	(Australia) R Case (Australia) G Masters	6	6

Semifinals
1	(Australia) J Newcombe (Australia) T Roche	3	7	7
3	(West Germany) J Fassbender (West Germany) K Meiler	6	6	6
(United States) H Pfister (United States) B Walts	6	4	6
2	(Australia) R Case (Australia) G Masters	3	6	7

Final
1	(Australia) J Newcombe (Australia) T Roche	6	6	6
2	(Australia) R Case (Australia) G Masters	7	3	1
