= 1976 Buckeye Tennis Championships =

- Date: August 2–8
- Edition: 7th
- Category: Grand Prix (Two Star)
- Draw: 48S / 24D
- Prize money: $87,500
- Surface: Hard / outdoor
- Location: Grove City, Columbus, Ohio, United States
- Venue: Buckeye Boys Ranch

Champions

Singles
- (United States) Roscoe Tanner

Doubles
- (United States) William Brown / (United States) Brian Teacher
← 1975 ·	Columbus Open	· 1977 →

The 1976 Buckeye Tennis Championships was a men's tennis tournament played on outdoor hard courts at the Buckeye Boys Ranch in Grove City, Columbus, Ohio in the United States that was part of Two Star category of the 1976 Grand Prix circuit. It was the seventh edition of the tournament and was held from August 2 through August 8, 1976. First-seeded Roscoe Tanner won the singles title and earned $16,000 in first-prize money.

== Finals ==
=== Singles ===
(United States) Roscoe Tanner defeated (United States) Stan Smith 6–4, 7–6^{(7–5)}

- It was Tanner's 2nd singles title of the year and 6th of his career.

=== Doubles ===
(United States) William Brown / (United States) Brian Teacher defeated (United States) Fred McNair / (United States) Sherwood Stewart 6–3, 6–4
