= 1977 Custom Credit Australian Indoor Championships – Singles =

Singles
- 1977 Custom Credit Australian Indoor Championships

Final
- Champion: (United States) Jimmy Connors
- Runner-up: (Australia) Ken Rosewall
- Score: 7–5, 6–4, 6–2

Details
- Draw: 32
- Seeds: 8

Events
Singles	Doubles
← 1976 ·	Australian Indoor Tennis Championships	· 1978 →

Geoff Masters was the defending champion but lost in the second round to Tony Roche.

Jimmy Connors won in the final 7–5, 6–4, 6–2 against Ken Rosewall.

== Seeds ==
1. (United States) Jimmy Connors (champion)
2. (United States) Vitas Gerulaitis (semifinals)
3. (United States) Harold Solomon (first round)
4. (Australia) Ken Rosewall (final)
5. (United States) Bill Scanlon (second round)
6. (Australia) Kim Warwick (first round)
7. (Australia) Tony Roche (quarterfinals)
8. (Australia) Phil Dent (quarterfinals)

== Draw ==
=== Key ===
- Q = Qualifier
- WC = Wild card
- LL = Lucky loser
- Alt = Alternate
- SE = Special exempt
- PR = Protected ranking
- ITF = ITF entry
- JE = Junior exempt
- w/o = Walkover
- r = Retired
- d = Defaulted
- SR = Special ranking

Semifinals
1	(United States) Jimmy Connors	6	6
(United States) Nick Saviano	1	1
4	(Australia) Ken Rosewall	7	6
2	(United States) Vitas Gerulaitis	6	4

Final
1	(United States) Jimmy Connors	7	6	6
4	(Australia) Ken Rosewall	5	4	2

=== Section 1 ===
First round
1	(United States) J Connors	6	6
(Australia) B Drewett	1	0
(Australia) C Letcher	3	6	7
(Australia) A Stone	6	4	5
(New Zealand) R Simpson	5	1
(Australia) G Masters	7	6
(Australia) D Crealy	6	3	5
7	(Australia) T Roche	4	6	7
3	(United States) H Solomon	1	6
(Australia) C Dibley	6	7
(Australia) R Ruffels	4	2
(United Kingdom) R Lewis	6	6
(West Germany) J Fassbender	1	2
(United States) N Saviano	6	6
(Australia) R Case	6	6
6	(Australia) K Warwick	1	3

Second round
1	(United States) J Connors	6	6
(Australia) C Letcher	0	4
(Australia) G Masters	0	3
7	(Australia) T Roche	6	6
(Australia) C Dibley	6	4	7
(United Kingdom) R Lewis	3	6	5
(United States) N Saviano	6	6
(Australia) R Case	3	2

Quarterfinals
1	(United States) J Connors	6	6
7	(Australia) T Roche	2	0
(Australia) C Dibley	5	7	3
(United States) N Saviano	7	6	6

Semifinals
1	(United States) J Connors	6	6
(United States) N Saviano	1	1

=== Section 2 ===
First round
5	(United States) B Scanlon	6	6
(Australia) P Kronk	4	4
(United States) H Pfister	6	7
(Australia) B Carmichael	3	6
(Australia) M Edmondson	3	6	4
(United States) T Wilkison	6	2	6
(West Germany) K Meiler	1	0
4	(Australia) K Rosewall	6	6
8	(Australia) P Dent	6	7
(Australia) S Ball	3	6
(Australia) J Newcombe	2	6	7
(United States) S Krulevitz	6	4	5
(Netherlands) L Sanders	6	6
(Czechoslovakia) J Hřebec	4	3
(New Zealand) B Fairlie	1	4
2	(United States) V Gerulaitis	6	6

Second round
5	(United States) B Scanlon	2	3
(United States) H Pfister	6	6
(United States) T Wilkison	2	5
4	(Australia) K Rosewall	6	7
8	(Australia) P Dent	7	7
(Australia) J Newcombe	6	5
(Netherlands) L Sanders	1	3
2	(United States) V Gerulaitis	6	6

Quarterfinals
(United States) H Pfister	2	3
4	(Australia) K Rosewall	6	6
8	(Australia) P Dent	2	2
2	(United States) V Gerulaitis	6	6

Semifinals
4	(Australia) K Rosewall	7	6
2	(United States) V Gerulaitis	6	4
