= 1976 Berlin Open =

- Date: 14–20 June
- Edition: 2nd
- Category: Grand Prix (One star)
- Draw: 32S / 16D
- Prize money: $50,000
- Surface: Clay / outdoor
- Location: Berlin, West Germany

Champions

Singles
- (Paraguay) Víctor Pecci

Doubles
- (Chile) Patricio Cornejo / (Spain) Antonio Muñoz
← 1973 ·	Berlin Open	· 1977 →

The 1976 Berlin Open, also known as the Berlin Grand Prix, was a men's tennis tournament staged in Berlin, West Germany that was part of the Grand Prix circuit and categorized as a One star event. The tournament was played on outdoor clay courts and was held from 14 June until 20 June 1976. It was the second edition of the tournament and unseeded Víctor Pecci won the singles title.

== Finals ==
=== Singles ===
(Paraguay) Víctor Pecci defeated (West Germany) Hans-Jürgen Pohmann 6–1, 6–2, 5–7, 6–3

- It was Pecci's 2nd singles title of the year and of his career.

=== Doubles ===
(Chile) Patricio Cornejo / (Spain) Antonio Muñoz defeated (West Germany) Jürgen Fassbender / (West Germany) Hans-Jürgen Pohmann 7–5, 6–1
