= Boca West International =

Defunct tennis tournament
- Tour: IPA circuit
- Founded: 1975
- Abolished: 1976
- Editions: 2
- Location: Boca Raton, Florida, U.S.
- Surface: Hard / outdoor

The Boca West International also known as the Boca Raton IPA Classic is a defunct tennis tournament that was part of Bill Riordan's International Players Association (IPA) circuit from 1975–1976. The event was held in Boca Raton, Florida and was played on outdoor hard courts.

== Past finals ==
=== Singles ===
Year	Champions	Runners-up	Score
1975	(United States) Jimmy Connors	(Germany) Jürgen Fassbender	6–4, 6–2
1976	(United States) Butch Walts	(United States) Cliff Richey	3–6, 6–4, 6–4

=== Doubles ===
Year	Champions	Runners-up	Score
1975	(Spain) Juan Gisbert, Sr. (United States) Clark Graebner	(Germany) Jürgen Fassbender (Romania) Ion Țiriac	6–2, 6–1
1976	(United States) Vitas Gerulaitis (United States) Clark Graebner	(United States) Bruce Manson (United States) Butch Walts	6–2, 6–4
