= Laguna Niguel Classic =

The Laguna Niguel Classic is a defunct tennis tournament that was played on the Grand Prix tennis circuit in 1977. The event was held in Laguna Niguel, California and was played on outdoor hard courts. Andrew Pattison won the singles title while James Chico Hagey and Billy Martin partnered to win the doubles title.

== Past finals ==
=== Singles ===
Year	Champion	Runner-up	Score
1977	(Rhodesia) Andrew Pattison	(Australia) Colin Dibley	2–6, 7–6, 6–4

=== Doubles ===
Year	Champion	Runner-up	Score
1977	(United States) James Chico Hagey (United States) Billy Martin	(United States) Peter Fleming (United States) Trey Waltke	6–3, 6–4
