= 1976 Stockholm Open – Singles =

Singles
- 1976 Stockholm Open

Final
- Champion: (United Kingdom) Mark Cox
- Runner-up: (Spain) Manuel Orantes
- Score: 4–6, 7–5, 7–6

Details
- Draw: 64

Events
Singles	Doubles
← 1975 ·	Stockholm Open	· 1977 →

Adriano Panatta was the defending champion, but did not participate this year.

Mark Cox won the title, defeating Manuel Orantes 4–6, 7–5, 7–6 in the final.

== Seeds ==
1. (United States) Jimmy Connors (semifinals)
2. (Sweden) Björn Borg (quarterfinals)

== Draw ==
=== Key ===
- Q = Qualifier
- WC = Wild card
- LL = Lucky loser
- Alt = Alternate
- ITF = ITF entry
- PR = Protected ranking
- SR = Special ranking
- SE = Special exempt
- JE = Junior exempt
- JR = Junior Accelerator Programme entrant
- CO = College Accelerator Programme entrant
- NG = Next Gen Accelerator Program entrant
- w/o = Walkover
- r = Retired
- d = Defaulted

=== Finals ===
Semifinals
1	(United States) Jimmy Connors	6	6	6
(United Kingdom) Mark Cox	7	3	7
(Spain) Manuel Orantes	6	6
(United States) Brian Gottfried	2	2

Final
(United Kingdom) Mark Cox	4	7	7
(Spain) Manuel Orantes	6	5	6

=== Top half ===
==== Section 1 ====
First round
1	(United States) J Connors	6	6
(Czechoslovakia) J Hřebec	3	1
(Sweden) Lars Samuelson	0	4
(Sweden) B Andersson	6	6
(Hungary) B Taróczy	6	3	7
(Australia) J James	4	7	5
(United States) D Bohrnstedt	6	6
(United States) V Amaya	4	4
(Mexico) R Ramírez	7	6
(Spain) J Gisbert Sr.	6	4
(Poland) J Niedźwiedzki	6	6
(United States) P DuPré	1	4
(Netherlands) T Okker	6	7
(Sweden) J Zabrodsky	2	6
(Czechoslovakia) V Zedník	4	4
(Sweden) R Norberg	6	6

Second round
1	(United States) J Connors	6	6
(Sweden) B Andersson	3	1
(Hungary) B Taróczy	6	7
(United States) D Bohrnstedt	3	5
(Mexico) R Ramírez	6	6	6
(Poland) J Niedźwiedzki	2	7	2
(Netherlands) T Okker	6	4	6
(Sweden) R Norberg	4	6	2

Third round
1	(United States) J Connors	6	6
(Hungary) B Taróczy	4	2
(Mexico) R Ramírez	7	6
(Netherlands) T Okker	6	1

Quarterfinals
1	(United States) J Connors	7	6
(Mexico) R Ramírez	6	1

==== Section 2 ====
First round
(Argentina) G Vilas	7	6
(United States) J Ross	6	0
(United States) N Saviano	6	6	6
(United States) T Moor	7	2	7
(Italy) A Zugarelli	1	1
(South Africa) B Bertram	6	6
(Sweden) ON Bengtson	7	5	6
(United Kingdom) R Lewis	5	7	4
(United States) E Dibbs	5	2
(United Kingdom) M Cox	7	6
(South Africa) F McMillan	4	5
(Sweden) D Palm	6	7
(Poland) W Fibak	6	3	6
(United States) M Riessen	3	6	3
(Sweden) U Eriksson	7	0	6
(United States) Z Guerry	5	6	4

Second round
(Argentina) G Vilas	6	4	6
(United States) T Moor	4	6	2
(South Africa) B Bertram	6	4	6
(Sweden) ON Bengtson	3	6	2
(United Kingdom) M Cox	2	7	6
(Sweden) D Palm	6	6	2
(Poland) W Fibak	6	7
(Sweden) U Eriksson	2	5

Third round
(Argentina) G Vilas	1	6	6
(South Africa) B Bertram	6	4	7
(United Kingdom) M Cox	7	6
(Poland) W Fibak	5	3

Quarterfinals
(South Africa) B Bertram	6	5	2
(United Kingdom) M Cox	0	7	6

=== Bottom half ===
==== Section 3 ====
First round
(Austria) H Kary	1	1
(Pakistan) H Rahim	6	6
(United Kingdom) J Feaver	6	6
(United States) R Lutz	3	3
(United States) M Estep	7	2	2
(Argentina) L Álvarez	6	6	6
(Switzerland) H Günthardt	4	6	2
(United States) H Solomon	6	4	6
(Australia) B Phillips-Moore	6	6
(Spain) A Muñoz	1	3
(Socialist Federal Republic of Yugoslavia) N Špear	7	7
(Paraguay) V Pecci	6	5
(United Kingdom) C Dowdeswell	6	6
(Sweden) P Hjertquist	3	3
(Sweden) K Johansson	5	0
(Spain) M Orantes	7	6

Second round
(Pakistan) H Rahim	6	7
(United Kingdom) J Feaver	2	6
(Argentina) L Álvarez	0	4
(United States) H Solomon	6	6
(Australia) B Phillips-Moore	4	3
(Socialist Federal Republic of Yugoslavia) N Špear	6	6
(United Kingdom) C Dowdeswell	2	6	1
(Spain) M Orantes	6	3	6

Third round
(Pakistan) H Rahim	6	6	6
(United States) H Solomon	7	4	4
(Socialist Federal Republic of Yugoslavia) N Špear	1	2
(Spain) M Orantes	6	6

Quarterfinals
(Pakistan) H Rahim	4	3
(Spain) M Orantes	6	6

==== Section 4 ====
First round
(Czechoslovakia) F Pála	7	4	6
(Czechoslovakia) T Šmíd	6	6	4
(Australia) C Dibley	6	2
(United States) S Smith	7	6
(Sweden) T Svensson	5	2
(United States) S Turner	7	6
(Spain) J Higueras	3	1
(United States) B Gottfried	6	6
(United Kingdom) J Lloyd	6	6
(United States) E van Dillen	4	4
(South Africa) B Hewitt	2	6	7
(South Africa) R Moore	6	3	5
(Sweden) J Norbäck	6	4	6
(South Africa) P Cramer	1	6	3
(United Kingdom) R Drysdale	2	2
2	(Sweden) B Borg	6	6

Second round
(Czechoslovakia) F Pála	2	3
(United States) S Smith	6	6
(United States) S Turner	1	3
(United States) B Gottfried	6	6
(United Kingdom) J Lloyd	6	7
(South Africa) B Hewitt	4	6
(Sweden) J Norbäck	2	6	3
2	(Sweden) B Borg	6	2	6

Third round
(United States) S Smith	3	4
(United States) B Gottfried	6	6
(United Kingdom) J Lloyd	2	7	6
2	(Sweden) B Borg	6	6	7

Quarterfinals
(United States) B Gottfried	6	4	7
2	(Sweden) B Borg	2	6	6
