= 1977 Berlin Open =

- Date: 13–19 June
- Edition: 3rd
- Category: Grand Prix (One star)
- Draw: 32S / 16D
- Prize money: $50,000
- Surface: Clay / outdoor
- Location: Berlin, West Germany

Champions

Singles
- (Italy) Paolo Bertolucci

Doubles
- (Chile) Hans Gildemeister / (Chile) Belus Prajoux (Czechoslovakia) Pavel Huťka / (Czechoslovakia) Vladimír Zedník
← 1976 ·	Berlin Open	· 1978 →

The 1977 Berlin Open, also known as the Berlin International Championships, was a men's tennis tournament staged in Berlin, West Germany. It was part of the Grand Prix circuit and categorized as a One star event. The tournament was played on outdoor clay courts and was held from 13 June until 19 June, 1977. It was the third edition of the tournament and first-seeded Paolo Bertolucci won the singles title.

== Finals ==
=== Singles ===
(Italy) Paolo Bertolucci defeated (Czechoslovakia) Jiří Hřebec 6–4, 5–7, 4–6, 6–2, 6–4

- It was Bertolucci's 3rd singles title of the year and the 6th and last of his career.

=== Doubles ===
(Chile) Hans Gildemeister / (Chile) Belus Prajoux and (Czechoslovakia) Pavel Huťka / (Czechoslovakia) Vladimír Zedník final not played, title shared
