= 1976 Air India/BP Tennis Classic =

- Date: 11–17 October
- Edition: 3rd
- Category: Grand Prix (One Star)
- Draw: 32S / 16D
- Prize money: $50,000
- Surface: Grass / outdoor
- Location: Brisbane, Queensland, Australia
- Venue: Milton Courts

Champions

Singles
- (Australia) Mark Edmondson

Doubles
- (Australia) Syd Ball / (Australia) Kim Warwick
- South Pacific Tennis Classic

The 1976 Air India/BP Tennis Classic, also known as the South Pacific Championships, was an Association of Tennis Professionals men's tournament held on outdoor grass courts at the Milton Courts in Brisbane, Queensland, Australia that was part of the One Star category of the 1976 Grand Prix tennis circuit. It was the third edition of the tournament and was held from 11 October until 17 October 1976. The tournament had moved to Brisbane from the Royal South Yarra Tennis Club in Melbourne where the previous editions had been held. Mark Edmondson won the singles title.

== Finals ==
=== Singles ===
(Australia) Mark Edmondson defeated (Australia) Phil Dent 3–6, 6–4, 6–4, 6–4

- It was Edmondson's 2nd singles title of the year and of his career.

=== Doubles ===
(Australia) Syd Ball / (Australia) Kim Warwick defeated (New Zealand) Brian Fairlie / (Egypt) Ismail El Shafei 6–4, 6–4
