= 1976 Custom Credit Australian Indoor Championships =

- Date: 18–24 October
- Edition: 4th
- Category: Grand Prix circuit (Four star)
- Draw: 64S / 32D
- Prize money: $125,000
- Surface: Hard / indoor
- Location: Sydney, Australia
- Venue: Hordern Pavilion

Champions

Singles
- (Australia) Geoff Masters

Doubles
- (Egypt) Ismail El Shafei / (New Zealand) Brian Fairlie
- Australian Indoor Tennis Championships

The 1976 Custom Credit Australian Indoor Championships was a men's professional tennis tournament played on indoor hard courts at the Hordern Pavilion in Sydney, Australia. It was the fourth edition of the tournament and was part of the 1976 Commercial Union Assurance Grand Prix circuit. The tournament was held from 18 October through 24 October 1976. Geoff Masters won the singles title.

== Finals ==
=== Singles ===
(Australia) Geoff Masters defeated (United States) James Delaney 4–6, 6–3, 7–6, 6–3

- It was Masters' 3rd title of the year and the 12th of his career.

=== Doubles ===
(Egypt) Ismail El Shafei / (New Zealand) Brian Fairlie defeated (Australia) Syd Ball / (Australia) Kim Warwick 4–6, 6–4, 7–6

- It was El Shafei's only title of the year and the 5th of his career. It was Fairlie's 2nd title of the year and the 4th of his career.
