= 1976 Japan Open Tennis Championships =

- Date: 1–7 November
- Edition: 4th
- Category: Grand Prix circuit (Three star)
- Draw: 64S / 32D
- Prize money: $100,000
- Surface: Hard / outdoor
- Location: Tokyo, Japan

Champions

Singles
- (United States) Roscoe Tanner

Doubles
- (Australia) Bob Carmichael / (Australia) Ken Rosewall
- Japan Open

The 1976 Japan Open Tennis Championships was a tennis tournament played on hard courts and part of the 1976 Commercial Union Assurance Grand Prix circuit. It was the fourth edition of the event and took place in Tokyo, Japan. The tournament was held from November 1 through November 7, 1976. First-seeded Roscoe Tanner won the singles title.

== Finals ==
=== Singles ===
(United States) Roscoe Tanner defeated (Italy) Corrado Barazzutti 6–3, 6–2

- It was Tanner 4th singles title of the year and the 8th of his career.

=== Doubles ===
(Australia) Bob Carmichael / (Australia) Ken Rosewall defeated (Egypt) Ismail El Shafei / (New Zealand) Brian Fairlie 6–4, 6–4
