= 1976 Pacific Coast Open =

- Date: September 27 – October 4
- Edition: 88th
- Category: Grand Prix (4 Star)
- Draw: 64S / 32D
- Prize money: $125,000
- Surface: Carpet / indoor
- Location: San Francisco, California, US
- Venue: Cow Palace

Champions

Singles
- (United States) Roscoe Tanner

Doubles
- (United States) Dick Stockton / (United States) Roscoe Tanner
- Pacific Coast Championships

The 1976 Pacific Coast Open, also known by its sponsored name Fireman's Fund International, was a men's tennis tournament played on indoor carpet courts at the Cow Palace in San Francisco, California in the United States. The event was part of the 4 Star category of the 1976 Grand Prix circuit and Barry MacKay (tennis) was the tournament director. It was the 88th edition of the tournament and ran from September 27 through October 4, 1976. The singles event had a field of 64 players and eight spots in the main draw were available after a two-tier qualifying event consisting of more than 200 players. Third-seeded Roscoe Tanner won the singles title and $20,000 first prize money. The total attendance for the tournament was 41,000, down from the previous year's 55,000.

== Finals ==
=== Singles ===
(United States) Roscoe Tanner defeated (United States) Brian Gottfried 4–6, 7–5, 6–1

- It was Tanner's 3rd singles title of the year and the 7th of his career.

=== Doubles ===
(United States) Dick Stockton / (United States) Roscoe Tanner defeated (United States) Brian Gottfried / (South Africa) Bob Hewitt 6–3, 6–4
