= 1977 Custom Credit Australian Indoor Championships =

- Date: 17–23 October
- Edition: 5th
- Category: Grand Prix circuit (Four star)
- Draw: 32S / 16D
- Prize money: $50,000
- Surface: Hard / indoor
- Location: Sydney, Australia
- Venue: Hordern Pavilion

Champions

Singles
- (United States) Jimmy Connors

Doubles
- (Australia) John Newcombe / (Australia) Tony Roche
- Australian Indoor Tennis Championships

The 1977 Custom Credit Australian Indoor Championships was a men's tennis tournament played on indoor hard courts at the Hordern Pavilion in Sydney in Australia and was part of the 1977 Colgate-Palmolive Grand Prix. The tournament was held from 17 October through 23 October 1977. First-seeded Jimmy Connors won the singles title.

== Finals ==
=== Singles ===
(United States) Jimmy Connors defeated (Australia) Ken Rosewall 7–5, 6–4, 6–2

- It was Connors' 6th singles title of the year and the 59th of his career.

=== Doubles ===
(Australia) John Newcombe / (Australia) Tony Roche defeated (Australia) Ross Case / (Australia) Geoff Masters 6–7, 6–3, 6–1

- It was Newcombe's only title of the year and the 64th of his career. It was Roche's 2nd title of the year and the 25th of his career.
