= 1976 Washington Star International =

- Date: July 19–26
- Edition: 8th
- Category: Grand Prix (four star)
- Draw: 64S / 32D
- Prize money: $125,000
- Surface: Clay / outdoor
- Location: Washington, D.C., United States

Champions

Singles
- (United States) Jimmy Connors

Doubles
- (United States) Brian Gottfried / (Mexico) Raúl Ramírez
- Washington Open

The 1976 Washington Star International was a men's tennis tournament and was played on outdoor clay courts. It was categorized as a four star tournament and was part of the 1976 Grand Prix circuit. It was the 8th edition of the tournament and was held in Washington, D.C. from July 19 through 26, 1976. Second-seeded Jimmy Connors won the singles title.

== Finals ==
=== Singles ===
(United States) Jimmy Connors defeated (Mexico) Raúl Ramírez 6–2, 6–4

- It was Connors' 7th singles title of the year and the 48th of his career.

=== Doubles ===
(United States) Brian Gottfried / (Mexico) Raúl Ramírez defeated (United States) Arthur Ashe / (United States) Jimmy Connors 6–3, 6–3
