= 1976 Stockholm Open – Doubles =

Doubles
- 1976 Stockholm Open

Final
- Champions: (South Africa) Bob Hewitt (South Africa) Frew McMillan
- Runners-up: (Netherlands) Tom Okker (United States) Marty Riessen
- Score: 6–4, 4–6, 6–4

Events
Singles	Doubles
← 1975 ·	Stockholm Open	· 1977 →

Bob Hewitt and Frew McMillan were the defending champions.

Hewitt and McMillan successfully defended their title, defeating Tom Okker and Marty Riessen 6–4, 4–6, 6–4 in the final.

== Seeds ==
1. (United States) Brian Gottfried / (Mexico) Raúl Ramírez (semifinals)
2. (South Africa) Bob Hewitt / (South Africa) Frew McMillan (champions)

== Draw ==
=== Key ===
- Q = Qualifier
- WC = Wild card
- LL = Lucky loser
- Alt = Alternate
- ITF = ITF entry
- PR = Protected ranking
- SR = Special ranking
- SE = Special exempt
- JE = Junior exempt
- JR = Junior Accelerator Programme entrant
- CO = College Accelerator Programme entrant
- NG = Next Gen Accelerator Program entrant
- w/o = Walkover
- r = Retired
- d = Defaulted

=== Finals ===
Semifinals
1	(United States) Brian Gottfried (Mexico) Raúl Ramírez	6	3	3
(Netherlands) Tom Okker (United States) Marty Riessen	4	6	6
(United Kingdom) John Feaver (Australia) John James	4	2
2	(South Africa) Bob Hewitt (South Africa) Frew McMillan	6	6

Final
(Netherlands) Tom Okker (United States) Marty Riessen	4	6	4
2	(South Africa) Bob Hewitt (South Africa) Frew McMillan	6	4	6

=== Top half ===
First round
1	(United States) B Gottfried (Mexico) R Ramírez	6	6
(United Kingdom) R Drysdale (United Kingdom) R Lewis	2	3
(Australia) B Phillips-Moore (United States) S Turner	6	7
(Sweden) L Johansson (Sweden) T Larsen	4	5
(South Africa) P Cramer (United Kingdom) C Dowdeswell	6	7
(Sweden) D Palm (Sweden) J Zabrodsky	3	5
(Sweden) K Johansson (Sweden) J Källqvist	7	6
(United States) P Pearson (Socialist Federal Republic of Yugoslavia) N Špear	5	3
(Netherlands) T Okker (United States) M Riessen	6	6
(Sweden) B Andersson (Sweden) T Svensson	1	4
(United States) V Amaya (United States) P DuPré	6	6	6
(United States) T Moor (United States) N Saviano	4	7	7
(Spain) J Gisbert Sr. (Spain) M Orantes	w/o
(Argentina) L Álvarez (Paraguay) V Pecci
(Czechoslovakia) F Pala (Czechoslovakia) V Zedník	6	4	6
(United States) D Bohrnstedt (United States) Z Guerry	1	6	1

Second round
1	(United States) B Gottfried (Mexico) R Ramírez	7	6
(Australia) B Phillips-Moore (United States) S Turner	6	2
(South Africa) P Cramer (United Kingdom) C Dowdeswell	6	6
(Sweden) K Johansson (Sweden) J Källqvist	2	4
(Netherlands) T Okker (United States) M Riessen	6	6
(United States) T Moor (United States) N Saviano	2	2
(Spain) J Gisbert Sr. (Spain) M Orantes	6	7
(Czechoslovakia) F Pala (Czechoslovakia) V Zedník	4	6

Quarterfinals
1	(United States) B Gottfried (Mexico) R Ramírez	6	6
(South Africa) P Cramer (United Kingdom) C Dowdeswell	3	4
(Netherlands) T Okker (United States) M Riessen	6	6
(Spain) J Gisbert Sr. (Spain) M Orantes	2	3

Semifinals
1	(United States) B Gottfried (Mexico) R Ramírez	6	3	3
(Netherlands) T Okker (United States) M Riessen	4	6	6

=== Bottom half ===
First round
(United Kingdom) M Cox (United Kingdom) J Lloyd	6	2	3
(United Kingdom) J Feaver (Australia) J James	4	6	6
(Switzerland) H Günthardt (United States) H Hoyt	3	1
(United States) H Solomon (United States) E van Dillen	6	6
(Czechoslovakia) J Hřebec (Czechoslovakia) T Šmíd	4	4
(Australia) C Dibley (South Africa) R Moore	6	6
(United States) K Richardson (Sweden) Björn Wahlström	3	4
(United States) R Lutz (United States) S Smith	6	6
(South Africa) B Bertram (Austria) H Kary	7	6
(Sweden) Bengt Lundstedt (Sweden) O Palmer	6	1
(Spain) J Higueras (Spain) A Muñoz	3	1
(Poland) W Fibak (Hungary) B Taróczy	6	6
(Sweden) ON Bengtson (Sweden) R Norberg	6	2	2
(United States) M Estep (Pakistan) H Rahim	4	6	6
(Poland) J Niedźwiedzki (United States) J Ross	4	3
2	(South Africa) B Hewitt (South Africa) F McMillan	6	6

Second round
(United Kingdom) J Feaver (Australia) J James	7	1	7
(United States) H Solomon (United States) E van Dillen	5	6	6
(Australia) C Dibley (South Africa) R Moore	6	6
(United States) R Lutz (United States) S Smith	3	4
(South Africa) B Bertram (Austria) H Kary	2	5
(Poland) W Fibak (Hungary) B Taróczy	6	7
(United States) M Estep (Pakistan) H Rahim	2	2
2	(South Africa) B Hewitt (South Africa) F McMillan	6	6

Quarterfinals
(United Kingdom) J Feaver (Australia) J James	6	6	6
(Australia) C Dibley (South Africa) R Moore	7	4	3
(Poland) W Fibak (Hungary) B Taróczy	2	4
2	(South Africa) B Hewitt (South Africa) F McMillan	6	6

Semifinals
(United Kingdom) J Feaver (Australia) J James	4	2
2	(South Africa) B Hewitt (South Africa) F McMillan	6	6
