= 1976 Hitachi Tennis Classic =

- Date: 25–31 October
- Edition: 2nd
- Category: Grand Prix (One Star)
- Draw: 32S / 16D
- Prize money: $50,000
- Surface: Carpet / indoor
- Location: Perth, Western Australia, Australia
- Venue: Perth Entertainment Centre

Champions

Singles
- (Australia) Ray Ruffels

Doubles
- (United States) Dick Stockton / (United States) Roscoe Tanner
- Perth Indoor Tennis Classic

The 1976 Hitachi Tennis Classic, also known as the West Coast Classic, was an Association of Tennis Professionals men's tournament played on indoor carpet courts at the Perth Entertainment Centre in Perth, Western Australia, Australia that was part of the One Star category of the 1976 Grand Prix tennis circuit. It was the second edition of the tournament and was held from 25 October until 31 October 1976. Unseeded Ray Ruffels won the singles title.

== Finals ==
=== Singles ===
(Australia) Ray Ruffels defeated (Australia) Phil Dent 6–0, 4–6, 2–6, 6–3, 6–2

- It was Ruffels' only singles title of the year and the 5th and last of his career.

=== Doubles ===
(United States) Dick Stockton / (United States) Roscoe Tanner defeated (Australia) Bob Carmichael / (Egypt) Ismail El Shafei 6–7, 6–1, 6–2
