= 1974 Stadthalle Open – Singles =

Singles
- 1974 Stadthalle Open

Final
- Champion: (United States) Vitas Gerulaitis
- Runner-up: (Rhodesia) Andrew Pattison
- Score: 6–4, 3–6, 6–3, 6–2

Details
- Draw: 32
- Seeds: 8

Events
Singles	Doubles
Vienna Open	· 1976 →

Vitas Gerulaitis won in the final 6–4, 3–6, 6–3, 6–2 against Andrew Pattison.

== Seeds ==
1. (United States) Tom Gorman (semifinals)
2. (Hungary) Balázs Taróczy (semifinals)
3. (Rhodesia) Andrew Pattison (final)
4. (South Africa) Bob Hewitt (second round)
5. (South Africa) Raymond Moore (quarterfinals)
6. (Austria) Hans Kary (quarterfinals)
7. (South Africa) Frew McMillan (second round)
8. (West Germany) Christian Kuhnke (first round)

== Draw ==
=== Key ===
- Q = Qualifier
- WC = Wild card
- LL = Lucky loser
- Alt = Alternate
- SE = Special exempt
- PR = Protected ranking
- ITF = ITF entry
- JE = Junior exempt
- w/o = Walkover
- r = Retired
- d = Defaulted
- SR = Special ranking

=== Final ===
Semifinals
1	(United States) Tom Gorman	3	3
(United States) Vitas Gerulaitis	6	6
3	(Rhodesia) Andrew Pattison	7	4	7
2	(Hungary) Balázs Taróczy	5	6	5

Final
(United States) Vitas Gerulaitis	6	3	6	6
3	(Rhodesia) Andrew Pattison	4	6	3	2

=== Section 1 ===
First round
1	(United States) T Gorman	6	7
(Mexico) J Loyo-Mayo	3	5
(Australia) R Keldie	6	4	0
(Romania) I Țiriac	3	6	6
(West Germany) K Meiler	6	6
(Colombia) J Velasco Sr.	1	4
(Austria) P Pokorny	4	1
7	(South Africa) F McMillan	6	6
4	(South Africa) B Hewitt	7	6
(Socialist Federal Republic of Yugoslavia) N Špear	6	4
(Sweden) K Johansson	3	0
(United States) V Gerulaitis	6	6
(Poland) W Fibak	5	6	8
(Czechoslovakia) M Holeček	7	2	6
(Sweden) J-E Lundqvist	3	1
5	(South Africa) R Moore	6	6

Second round
1	(United States) T Gorman	1	7	7
(Romania) I Țiriac	6	6	5
(West Germany) K Meiler	6	6
7	(South Africa) F McMillan	2	1
4	(South Africa) B Hewitt	2	5
(United States) V Gerulaitis	6	7
(Poland) W Fibak	6	2	3
5	(South Africa) R Moore	3	6	6

Quarterfinals
1	(United States) T Gorman	7	1	6
(West Germany) K Meiler	5	6	2
(United States) V Gerulaitis	7	3	7
5	(South Africa) R Moore	6	6	5

Semifinals
1	(United States) T Gorman	3	3
(United States) V Gerulaitis	6	6

=== Section 2 ===
First round
6	(Austria) H Kary	4	7	7
(Czechoslovakia) F Pála	6	5	5
(Hungary) J Benyik	7	6
(Hungary) G Varga	5	4
(Czechoslovakia) J Písecký	2	5
(Sweden) O Bengtson	6	7
(United States) R Fisher	3	6
3	(Rhodesia) A Pattison	6	7
8	(West Germany) C Kuhnke	4	2
(Pakistan) H Rahim	6	6
(Austria) I Wimmer	1	6	6
(India) S Menon	6	2	2
(United Kingdom) G Battrick	6	7
(Colombia) I Molina	3	5
(India) J Singh	6	3	13
2	(Hungary) B Taróczy	4	6	15

Second round
6	(Austria) H Kary	6	4	8
(Hungary) J Benyik	1	6	6
(Sweden) O Bengtson	5	1
3	(Rhodesia) A Pattison	7	6
(Pakistan) H Rahim	6	6	8
(Austria) I Wimmer	1	7	10
(United Kingdom) G Battrick	4	6
2	(Hungary) B Taróczy	6	7

Quarterfinals
6	(Austria) H Kary	0	3
3	(Rhodesia) A Pattison	6	6
(Austria) I Wimmer	5	2
2	(Hungary) B Taróczy	7	6

Semifinals
3	(Rhodesia) A Pattison	7	4	7
2	(Hungary) B Taróczy	5	6	5
