= 1976 Cologne Cup =

- Date: 1–6 November
- Edition: 1st
- Category: Grand Prix (One star)
- Draw: 32S / 16D
- Prize money: US$50,000
- Surface: Carpet / indoor
- Location: Cologne, West Germany

Champions

Singles
- (United States) Jimmy Connors

Doubles
- (South Africa) Bob Hewitt / (South Africa) Frew McMillan
- Cologne Grand Prix

The 1976 Cologne Cup, was a men's tennis tournament played on indoor carpet courts in Cologne, West Germany that was part of the 1976 Commercial Union Assurance Grand Prix circuit and categorized as a One Star event. It was the inaugural edition of the tournament and was held from 1 November through 6 November 1976. First-seeded Jimmy Connors won the singles title and the accompanying $10,000 first-prize money

== Finals ==
=== Singles ===
(United States) Jimmy Connors defeated (South Africa) Frew McMillan 6–2, 6–3

- It was Connors' 11th singles title of the year and the 52nd of his career.

=== Doubles ===
(South Africa) Bob Hewitt / (South Africa) Frew McMillan defeated (Rhodesia) Colin Dowdeswell / (United States) Mike Estep 6–1, 3–6, 7–6
