= 1976 Fischer-Grand Prix =

- Date: 25–31 October
- Edition: 2nd
- Category: Grand Prix (One star)
- Draw: 32S / 16D
- Prize money: $50,000
- Surface: Hard / indoor
- Location: Vienna, Austria
- Venue: Wiener Stadthalle

Champions

Singles
- (Poland) Wojciech Fibak

Doubles
- (South Africa) Bob Hewitt / (South Africa) Frew McMillan
- Vienna Open

The 1976 Fischer-Grand Prix was a men's tennis tournament played on indoor hard courts at the Wiener Stadthalle in Vienna in Austria that was part of the 1976 Commercial Union Assurance Grand Prix circuit. It was the second edition of the tournament and was held from 25 October through 31 October 1976. Fifth-seeded Wojciech Fibak won the singles title.

== Finals ==
=== Singles ===
(Poland) Wojciech Fibak defeated (Mexico) Raúl Ramírez 6–7, 6–3, 6–4, 2–6, 6–1

- It was Fibak's 10th title of the year and the 15th of his career.

=== Doubles ===
(South Africa) Bob Hewitt / (South Africa) Frew McMillan defeated (United States) Brian Gottfried / (Mexico) Raúl Ramírez 6–4, 4–0 (Gottfried and Ramírez retired)

- It was Hewitt's 4th title of the year and the 28th of his career. It was McMillan's 7th title of the year and the 33rd of his career.
