= 1976 Fischer-Grand Prix – Doubles =

Doubles
- 1976 Fischer-Grand Prix

Final
- Champions: (South Africa) Bob Hewitt (South Africa) Frew McMillan
- Runners-up: (United States) Brian Gottfried (Mexico) Raúl Ramírez
- Score: 6–4, 4–0^{r}

Details
- Draw: 16
- Seeds: 4

Events
Singles	Doubles
- Vienna Open

Bob Hewitt and Frew McMillan won in the final 6–4, 4–0 after Brian Gottfried and Raúl Ramírez were forced to retire.

== Seeds ==
1. (United States) Brian Gottfried / (Mexico) Raúl Ramírez (final)
2. (South Africa) Bob Hewitt / (South Africa) Frew McMillan (champions)
3. (United States) Arthur Ashe / (Poland) Wojciech Fibak (semifinals)
4. (Rhodesia) Colin Dowdeswell / (United States) Mike Estep (quarterfinals)

== Draw ==
Key

- Q = Qualifier
- WC = Wild card
- LL = Lucky loser
- Alt = Alternate
- ITF = ITF entry
- PR = Protected ranking
- SR = Special ranking
- SE = Special exempt
- JE = Junior exempt
- JR = Junior Accelerator Programme entrant
- CO = College Accelerator Programme entrant
- NG = Next Gen Accelerator Program entrant
- w/o = Walkover
- r = Retired
- d = Defaulted

First round
1	(United States) B Gottfried (Mexico) R Ramírez	6	6
(Venezuela) J Andrew (United States) P Du Pré	3	3
(United States) J Ross (United States) S Turner	7	6	7
(Hungary) S Baranyi (Czechoslovakia) P Hutka	6	7	6
4	(Rhodesia) C Dowdeswell (United States) M Estep	6	7
(United States) Z Guerry (United States) C Richey	2	6
(New Zealand) O Parun (Hungary) B Taróczy	6	2
(Argentina) L Álvarez (Paraguay) V Pecci	7	6
(United States) H Bunis (United Kingdom) R Taylor	6	2
(Czechoslovakia) F Pála (Czechoslovakia) V Zedník	7	6
(Sweden) O Bengtson (United States) J McManus	7	2	3
3	(United States) A Ashe (Poland) W Fibak	6	6	6
(United States) V Gerulaitis (Austria) H Kary	6	6
(United States) P Pearson (Australia) B Phillips-Moore	3	3
(United Kingdom) J Feaver (Australia) J James	1	3
2	(South Africa) B Hewitt (South Africa) F McMillan	6	6

Quarterfinals
1	(United States) B Gottfried (Mexico) R Ramírez	6	6
(United States) J Ross (United States) S Turner	0	1
4	(Rhodesia) C Dowdeswell (United States) M Estep	6	6
(Argentina) L Álvarez (Paraguay) V Pecci	7	7
(Czechoslovakia) F Pála (Czechoslovakia) V Zedník	6	6
3	(United States) A Ashe (Poland) W Fibak	7	7
(United States) V Gerulaitis (Austria) H Kary	2	4
2	(South Africa) B Hewitt (South Africa) F McMillan	6	6

Semifinals
1	(United States) B Gottfried (Mexico) R Ramírez	7	6
(Argentina) L Álvarez (Paraguay) V Pecci	6	2
3	(United States) A Ashe (Poland) W Fibak	2	5
2	(South Africa) B Hewitt (South Africa) F McMillan	6	7

Final
1	(United States) B Gottfried (Mexico) R Ramírez	4	0^{r}
2	(South Africa) B Hewitt (South Africa) F McMillan	6	4
