= 1976 Fischer-Grand Prix – Singles =

Singles
- 1976 Fischer-Grand Prix

Final
- Champion: (Poland) Wojciech Fibak
- Runner-up: (Mexico) Raúl Ramírez
- Score: 6–7, 6–3, 6–4, 2–6, 6–1

Details
- Draw: 32
- Seeds: 8

Events
Singles	Doubles
← 1974 ·	Vienna Open	· 1977 →

Wojciech Fibak won in the final 6–7, 6–3, 6–4, 2–6, 6–1 against Raúl Ramírez.

== Seeds ==
1. (United States) ~~Jimmy Connors~~ (withdrew – back injury)
2. (Mexico) Raúl Ramírez (final)
3. (United States) Arthur Ashe (quarterfinals)
4. (United States) Brian Gottfried (quarterfinals)
5. (Poland) Wojciech Fibak (champion)
6. (United States) Vitas Gerulaitis (quarterfinals)
7. (New Zealand) Onny Parun (second round)
8. (United States) Cliff Richey (second round)

== Draw ==
=== Key ===
- Q = Qualifier
- WC = Wild card
- LL = Lucky loser
- Alt = Alternate
- SE = Special exempt
- PR = Protected ranking
- ITF = ITF entry
- JE = Junior exempt
- w/o = Walkover
- r = Retired
- d = Defaulted
- SR = Special ranking

=== Final ===
Semifinals
(Sweden) Ove Bengtson	1	4
5	(Poland) Wojciech Fibak	6	6
(Paraguay) Víctor Pecci	2	6	4
2	(Mexico) Raúl Ramírez	6	3	6

Final
5	(Poland) Wojciech Fibak	6	6	6
2	(Mexico) Raúl Ramírez	7	3	4

=== Section 1 ===
First round
LL	(United States) K Richardson	1	6	6
(Sweden) O Bengtson	6	1	7
(South Africa) B Hewitt	5	6
(United States) H Bunis	7	7
(Argentina) L Álvarez	7	6
(Czechoslovakia) F Pála	6	1
Q	(United States) P Pearson	4	7	6
6	(United States) V Gerulaitis	6	5	7
3	(United States) A Ashe	4	6	6
(South Africa) F McMillan	6	4	3
(United States) Z Guerry	1	4
(United States) M Estep	6	6
(Italy) A Zugarelli	6	6
LL	(Hungary) S Baranyi	2	4
Q	(United States) J McManus	1	1
5	(Poland) W Fibak	6	6

Second round
(Sweden) O Bengtson	7	6
(United States) H Bunis	6	4
(Argentina) L Álvarez	0	1
6	(United States) V Gerulaitis	6	6
3	(United States) A Ashe	6	6
(United States) M Estep	1	3
(Italy) A Zugarelli	1	1
5	(Poland) W Fibak	6	6

Quarterfinals
(Sweden) O Bengtson	7	2	6
6	(United States) V Gerulaitis	6	6	3
3	(United States) A Ashe	2	6	1
5	(Poland) W Fibak	6	1	6

Semifinals
(Sweden) O Bengtson	1	4
5	(Poland) W Fibak	6	6

=== Section 2 ===
First round
7	(New Zealand) O Parun	7	6
(Australia) B Phillips-Moore	5	2
(Paraguay) V Pecci	6	6	6
(Austria) H Kary	4	7	3
(Rhodesia) C Dowdeswell	4	4
LL	(Czechoslovakia) V Zedník	6	6
(Venezuela) J Andrew	6	0
4	(United States) B Gottfried	7	6
8	(United States) C Richey	7	6
(United States) S Turner	6	1
Q	(Czechoslovakia) P Hutka	6	1
(Hungary) B Taróczy	7	6
Q	(United Kingdom) J Feaver	6	6
(United States) P Du Pré	0	2
(United Kingdom) R Taylor	2	7	1
2	(Mexico) R Ramírez	6	5	6

Second round
7	(New Zealand) O Parun
(Paraguay) V Pecci	w/o
LL	(Czechoslovakia) V Zedník	7	6	1
4	(United States) B Gottfried	5	7	6
8	(United States) C Richey	1	6	3
(Hungary) B Taróczy	6	1	6
Q	(United Kingdom) J Feaver	5	2
2	(Mexico) R Ramírez	7	6

Quarterfinals
(Paraguay) V Pecci	7	2	6
4	(United States) B Gottfried	6	6	4
(Hungary) B Taróczy	4	6	0
2	(Mexico) R Ramírez	6	3	6

Semifinals
(Paraguay) V Pecci	2	6	4
2	(Mexico) R Ramírez	6	3	6
