= 1976 Stockholm Open =

- Date: 7–13 November
- Edition: 8th
- Category: Grand Prix circuit (Five star)
- Draw: 64S / 32D
- Prize money: US$ 150,000
- Surface: Hard / Indoor
- Location: Stockholm, Sweden
- Venue: Kungliga tennishallen

Champions

Singles
- (United Kingdom) Mark Cox

Doubles
- (South Africa) Bob Hewitt / (South Africa) Frew McMillan
- Stockholm Open

The 1976 Stockholm Open was a men's tennis tournament played on hard courts and part of the 1976 Commercial Union Assurance Grand Prix and took place at the Kungliga tennishallen in Stockholm, Sweden. It was the eighth edition of the tournament and was held from 7 November through 13 November 1976. Mark Cox won the singles title.

== Finals ==
=== Singles ===
(United Kingdom) Mark Cox defeated (Spain) Manuel Orantes, 4–6, 7–5, 7–6^{(7–3)}

=== Doubles ===
(South Africa) Bob Hewitt / (South Africa) Frew McMillan defeated (Netherlands) Tom Okker / (United States) Marty Riessen, 6–4, 4–6, 6–4
