= Joel Ross (tennis) =

American tennis player

- Country (sports): United States
- Plays: Right-handed

Singles
- Career record: 0–2
- Highest ranking: No. 288 (Dec 12, 1976)

Doubles
- Career record: 1–5

Grand Slam doubles results
- US Open: 1R (1977)
Medal record
Maccabiah Games
| Gold medal – first place | 1977 Tel Aviv | Men's doubles |

Joel Ross is an American former professional tennis player. His peak rank was No. 288, in December 1976. Ross was Big Ten singles champion in 1971, and at the 1977 Maccabiah Games in Israel he won the men's doubles gold medal.

== Biography ==
A native of Westbury, New York, he attended Westbury High School. Ross played collegiate tennis for the University of Michigan, was captain of the tennis team, and was Big Ten singles champion in 1971.

His Grand Prix appearances included a loss to Guillermo Vilas at the 1976 Stockholm Open, where he took the Argentine to a first set tiebreak. He featured in the men's doubles main draw of the 1977 US Open.

At the 1977 Maccabiah Games in Israel, in which he was player-coach for the Team USA tennis squad, he and partner Peter Rennert, who was later world No. 8 in doubles, won the men's doubles gold medal.
