= James Delaney (tennis) =

American tennis player

- Country (sports): United States
- Residence: Potomac, Maryland, U.S.
- Born: March 12, 1953 (age 73) Newton, Massachusetts, U.S.
- Height: 1.83 m (6 ft 0 in)
- Plays: Right-handed

Singles
- Career record: 78–132
- Highest ranking: No. 59 (23 August 1976)

Grand Slam singles results
- Australian Open: 1R (1977)
- French Open: 1R (1977, 1979)
- Wimbledon: 2R (1976, 1977)
- US Open: 3R (1979)

Doubles
- Career record: 86–122
- Career titles: 1
- Highest ranking: No. 104 (3 January 1983)

James Delaney (born March 12, 1953) is an American former professional tennis player. During his career, he won one doubles title.

Delaney played college tennis at Stanford University, where he won the NCAA national doubles title with Sandy Mayer in 1973 and with John Whitlinger in 1974. His younger brother Chris Delaney was also a touring pro.

== Early life and college career ==
James "Jim" Delaney was raised in Newton, Massachusetts, where he played competitive junior tennis. He committed to Stanford University to play collegiate tennis under head coach Dick Gould. At Stanford, Delaney helped the team capture consecutive NCAA Men's Tennis Championship team titles in 1973 and 1974. He won two consecutive NCAA national doubles titles with different partners, winning with Sandy Mayer in 1973, and with John Whitlinger in 1974. He earned All-American honors before graduating.

== Professional career ==
Delaney transitioned to the professional circuit and achieved a career-high singles ranking of World No. 59 on October 25, 1976. His most notable singles milestone came that same month at the 1976 Custom Credit Australian Indoor Championships in Sydney, where he advanced to the final as the sole remaining overseas challenger before finishing as the runner-up to Australia's Geoff Masters.

At the 1976 US Open, he played doubles with American Mike Machette, and they defeated Americans Steve Turner and Steve Siegel in the first round. However, they lost to the Indian brothers Anand Amritraj and Anand Amritraj in the second round.

Delaney captured his lone career ATP Grand Prix circuit title at the 1977 Taipei Summit Open. There, he paired with fellow American Pat DuPré to defeat American Tom Gorman and Australian Steve Docherty in straight-set tiebreakers.

== Grand Prix and WCT career finals ==
=== Singles (0–1) ===
Result	W/L	Date	Tournament	Surface	Opponent	Score
Loss	0–1	Oct 1976	Sydney Indoor, Australia	Hard (i)	(Australia) Geoff Masters	6–4, 3–6, 6–7, 3–6

=== Doubles (1–2) ===
Result	W/L	Date	Tournament	Surface	Partner	Opponents	Score
Loss	0–1	Aug 1974	Cincinnati, U.S.	Hard	(United States) John Whitlinger	(United States) Dick Dell (United States) Sherwood Stewart	6–4, 6–7, 2–6
Win	1–1	Nov 1979	Bombay, India	Clay	(United States) Chris Delaney	(West Germany) Thomas Fürst (West Germany) Wolfgang Popp	7–6, 6–2
Loss	1–2	Oct 1981	Maui, U.S.	Hard	(Australia) John Alexander	(United States) Tony Graham (United States) Matt Mitchell	3–6, 6–3, 6–7
