= Chico Hagey =

American tennis player

- Full name: James Hagey
- Country (sports): United States
- Born: February 25, 1953 (age 72); Evanston, Illinois

Singles
- Career record: 18–49
- Career titles: 0
- Highest ranking: No. 73 (November 22, 1976)

Grand Slam singles results
- Australian Open: 1R (1977)
- French Open: 1R (1977)
- Wimbledon: 2R (1973)
- US Open: 1R (1972, 1973, 1977)

Doubles
- Career record: 20–48
- Career titles: 1

Grand Slam doubles results
- Australian Open: 2R (1977)
- French Open: 3R (1977)
- Wimbledon: 3R (1977, 1978)
- US Open: 2R (1976)

James "Chico" Hagey (born February 25, 1953) is a former professional tennis player from the United States.

== Biography ==
Hagey, known by his nickname "Chico" which he has had since birth, was originally from Illinois but moved to San Diego at the age of nine and went to La Jolla High School. The national boys' championship winner in 1969, Hagey reached the number one junior ranking during the 1971 season. He attended Stanford University in the early 1970s and became a key member of the varsity tennis team, which won the Division 1 titles in 1973 and 1974. He was runner-up in the singles title to John Whitlinger in 1974.

Hagey's career suffered due to a broken leg he incurred in the opening round of 1972 US Open. In the shortest possible tennis match, Hagey had to retire hurt after the first point when he plowed into the fence and broke his right leg, giving the win to Georges Goven.

Hagey competed in all four Grand Slam tournaments over the course of his career. A second round appearance at the 1973 Wimbledon Championships was his best performance.

Hagey won USTA Amateur Grasscourt Championships in Newport, Rhode Island in 1974.

On the Grand Prix tennis circuit, the deepest Hagey reached in a singles draw was the semifinals at Hong Kong in 1976. He won one doubles title, the Laguna Niguel Classic, with Billy Martin in 1977.

== Grand Prix career finals ==
=== Doubles: 1 (1–0) ===
Result	W/L	Date	Tournament	Surface	Partner	Opponents	Score
Win	1–0	Sep 1977	Laguna Niguel, U.S.	Hard	(United States) Billy Martin	(United States) Peter Fleming (United States) Trey Waltke	6–3, 6–4
