= Butch Walts =

American tennis player (born 1955)

- Full name: Kenneth B. Walts
- Country (sports): United States
- Residence: Scottsdale, Arizona, US
- Born: June 4, 1955 (age 71) Modesto, California, US
- Height: 6 ft 4 in (1.93 m)
- Turned pro: 1975
- Retired: 1984
- Plays: Right-handed (one-handed backhand)
- Prize money: $454,343

Singles
- Career record: 137–134
- Career titles: 4
- Highest ranking: No. 30 (April 16, 1979)

Grand Slam singles results
- French Open: 1R (1979)
- Wimbledon: 2R (1977)
- US Open: QF (1978)

Doubles
- Career record: 172–146
- Career titles: 15
- Highest ranking: No. 23 (June 18, 1984)

Grand Slam doubles results
- French Open: 1R (1984)
- Wimbledon: 2R (1977)
- US Open: QF (1980)

Butch Walts (born June 4, 1955) is a former professional tennis player from the United States.

During his career, Walts won 4 singles titles and 15 doubles titles. He reached the quarter finals of the 1978 US Open, beating defending champion Guillermo Vilas before losing to John McEnroe. He achieved a career-high singles ranking of world No. 32 in 1979 and a career-high doubles ranking of world No. 23 in 1984. In 1981 Walts overcame testicular cancer and had surgery and chemotherapy.

== Career finals ==
=== Singles: 5 (4 titles / 1 runner-up) ===
Result	W-L	Date	Tournament	Surface	Opponent	Score
Win	1–0	Feb 1976	Boca Raton, US	Hard	(United States) Cliff Richey	3–6, 6–4, 6–4
Win	2–0	Oct 1977	San Francisco, US	Carpet	(United States) Brian Gottfried	4–6, 6–3, 7–5
Win	3–0	Apr 1979	Dayton, US	Carpet	(United States) Marty Riessen	6–3, 6–4
Win	4–0	Nov 1979	Bologna, Italy	Carpet	(Italy) Gianni Ocleppo	6–3, 6–2
Loss	4–1	Nov 1983	Ferrara, Italy	Carpet	(Sweden) Thomas Högstedt	4–6, 4–6

=== Doubles: 23 (15 titles / 8 runner-ups) ===
Result	W-L	Date	Tournament	Surface	Partner	Opponents	Score
Loss	0–1	Feb 1976	Boca Raton, US	Hard	(United States) Bruce Manson	(United States) Vitas Gerulaitis (United States) Clark Graebner	2–6, 4–6
Win	1–1	Nov 1976	Hong Kong	Hard	(United States) Hank Pfister	(India) Anand Amritraj (Romania) Ilie Năstase	6–4, 6–2
Win	2–1	Feb 1977	Dayton, US	Carpet	(United States) Hank Pfister	(United States) Jeff Borowiak (Rhodesia) Andrew Pattison	6–4, 7–6
Loss	2–2	Apr 1978	Dayton, US	Carpet	(United States) Hank Pfister	(United States) Brian Gottfried (Australia) Geoff Masters	3–6, 4–6
Win	3–2	Aug 1978	Atlanta, US	Hard	(Australia) John Alexander	(United States) Mike Cahill (Mexico) Marcello Lara	3–6, 6–4, 7–6
Win	4–2	Nov 1978	Taipei, Taiwan	Carpet	(United States) Sherwood Stewart	(Australia) Mark Edmondson (Australia) John Marks	6–2, 6–7, 7–6
Loss	4–3	Mar 1980	Frankfurt, Germany	Carpet	(Zimbabwe) Andrew Pattison	(India) Vijay Amritraj (United States) Stan Smith	7–6, 2–6, 2–6
Loss	4–4	Mar 1980	Milan, Italy	Carpet	(Zimbabwe) Andrew Pattison	(United States) Peter Fleming (United States) John McEnroe	2–6, 7–6, 2–6
Win	5–4	Apr 1980	Los Angeles, US	Hard	(United States) Brian Teacher	(India) Anand Amritraj (United States) John Austin	6–2, 6–4
Loss	5–5	Jun 1980	Surbiton, U.K.	Grass	(Zimbabwe) Andrew Pattison	(Australia) Mark Edmondson (Australia) Kim Warwick	6–7, 7–6, 7–6, 6–7, 13–15
Win	6–5	Jul 1980	Newport, US	Grass	(Zimbabwe) Andrew Pattison	(United States) Fritz Buehning (United States) Peter Rennert	7–6, 6–4
Win	7–5	Aug 1980	Atlanta, US	Hard	(United States) Tom Gullikson	(India) Anand Amritraj (United States) John Austin	6–7, 7–6, 7–5
Win	8–5	Nov 1980	Bologna, Italy	Carpet	(Hungary) Balázs Taróczy	(United States) Steve Denton (Australia) Paul McNamee	2–6, 6–3, 6–0
Win	9–5	Mar 1981	Denver, US	Carpet	(Zimbabwe) Andrew Pattison	(United States) Mel Purcell (United States) Dick Stockton	6–3, 6–4
Win	10–5	Mar 1981	Tampa, US	Hard	(South Africa) Bernard Mitton	(Australia) David Carter (Australia) Paul Kronk	6–3, 3–6, 6–1
Win	11–5	Apr 1981	Frankfurt, Germany	Carpet	(United States) Brian Teacher	(United States) Vitas Gerulaitis (United States) John McEnroe	7–5, 6–7, 7–5
Win	12–5	Apr 1981	Los Angeles, US	Hard	(United States) Tom Gullikson	(United States) John McEnroe (United States) Ferdi Taygan	6–4, 6–4
Win	13–5	Nov 1983	Ferrara, Italy	Carpet	(South Africa) Bernard Mitton	(Czechoslovakia) Stanislav Birner (Sweden) Stefan Simonsson	7–6, 0–6, 6–3
Loss	13–6	Nov 1983	Toulouse, France	Hard (i)	(South Africa) Bernard Mitton	(Switzerland) Heinz Günthardt (Czechoslovakia) Pavel Složil	7–5, 5–7, 4–6
Win	14–6	Feb 1984	La Quinta, US	Hard	(South Africa) Bernard Mitton	(United States) Scott Davis (United States) Ferdi Taygan	5–7, 6–3, 6–2
Loss	14–7	May 1984	Florence, Italy	Clay	(South Africa) Bernard Mitton	(United States) Mark Dickson (United States) Chip Hooper	6–7, 6–4, 5–7
Loss	14–8	Jun 1984	London/Queen's, UK	Grass	(South Africa) Bernard Mitton	(Australia) Pat Cash (Australia) Paul McNamee	4–6, 3–6
Win	15–8	Sep 1984	Honolulu, US	Hard	(United States) Gary Donnelly	(United States) Mark Dickson (United States) Mike Leach	7–6, 6–4
