= 1973 Stockholm Open – Doubles =

Doubles
- 1973 Stockholm Open

Final
- Champions: (United States) Jimmy Connors (Romania) Ilie Năstase
- Runners-up: (Australia) Bob Carmichael (South Africa) Frew McMillan
- Score: 6–3, 6–7, 6–2

Events
Singles	Doubles
← 1972 ·	Stockholm Open	· 1974 →

Tom Okker and Marty Riessen were the defending champions, but lost in the semifinals this year.

Jimmy Connors and Ilie Năstase won the title, defeating Bob Carmichael and Frew McMillan 6–3, 6–7, 6–2 in the final.

== Seeds ==
1. (Netherlands) Tom Okker / (United States) Marty Riessen (semifinals, retired)
2. (United States) Tom Gorman / (United States) Stan Smith (quarterfinals)

== Draw ==
=== Key ===
- Q = Qualifier
- WC = Wild card
- LL = Lucky loser
- Alt = Alternate
- ITF = ITF entry
- PR = Protected ranking
- SR = Special ranking
- SE = Special exempt
- JE = Junior exempt
- JR = Junior Accelerator Programme entrant
- CO = College Accelerator Programme entrant
- NG = Next Gen Accelerator Program entrant
- w/o = Walkover
- r = Retired
- d = Defaulted

=== Finals ===
Semifinals
1	(Netherlands) Tom Okker (United States) Marty Riessen	6	0^{r}
(United States) Jimmy Connors (Romania) Ilie Năstase	7	0
(Australia) Bob Carmichael (South Africa) Frew McMillan	4	6	7
(Australia) Barry Phillips-Moore (Pakistan) Haroon Rahim	6	3	5

Final
(United States) Jimmy Connors (Romania) Ilie Năstase	6	6	6
(Australia) Bob Carmichael (South Africa) Frew McMillan	3	7	2

=== Top half ===
First round
(United States) J Connors (Romania) I Năstase	6	6
(Sweden) B Andersson (Sweden) O Palmer	2	2
(West Germany) K Meiler (West Germany) HJ Pohmann	6	6
(France) P Dominguez (France) J Thamin	3	2
(Sweden) L Johansson (Sweden) R Norberg	5	6
(United Kingdom) G Battrick (United Kingdom) G Stilwell	7	7
(Sweden) K Johansson (Sweden) T Svensson	6	6
(Socialist Federal Republic of Yugoslavia) N Pilić (Chile) J Pinto Bravo	3	4

Second round
1	(Netherlands) T Okker (United States) M Riessen	6	6
(Spain) A Muñoz (Spain) M Orantes	1	3
(South Africa) R Moore (New Zealand) O Parun	2	4
(Sweden) ON Bengtson (Sweden) B Borg	6	6
(United States) J Connors (Romania) I Năstase	6	6
(West Germany) K Meiler (West Germany) HJ Pohmann	4	4
(United Kingdom) G Battrick (United Kingdom) G Stilwell	6	6
(Sweden) K Johansson (Sweden) T Svensson	2	1

Quarterfinals
1	(Netherlands) T Okker (United States) M Riessen	3	6	6
(Sweden) ON Bengtson (Sweden) B Borg	6	3	2
(United States) J Connors (Romania) I Năstase	7	6
(United Kingdom) G Battrick (United Kingdom) G Stilwell	5	4

Semifinals
1	(Netherlands) T Okker (United States) M Riessen	6	0^{r}
(United States) J Connors (Romania) I Năstase	7	0

=== Bottom half ===
First round
(United States) A Ashe (Romania) I Țiriac	6	6
(Sweden) T Larsen (Sweden) H Zahr	4	4
(Hungary) R Machán (Hungary) B Taróczy	4	6	7
(Chile) J Fillol (Colombia) I Molina	6	3	6
(Finland) G Berner (Finland) P Säilä	7	7
(Sweden) D Palm (Sweden) J Zabrodsky	5	6
(United States) J Borowiak (United Kingdom) B Mottram	6	4
(Australia) B Carmichael (South Africa) F McMillan	7	6

Second round
(United States) A Ashe (Romania) I Țiriac	6	6	3
(Hungary) R Machán (Hungary) B Taróczy	7	2	6
(Finland) G Berner (Finland) P Säilä	6	4
(Australia) B Carmichael (South Africa) F McMillan	7	6
(Australia) B Phillips-Moore (Pakistan) H Rahim	7	7
(Italy) C Barazzutti (Italy) A Zugarelli	6	5
(Sweden) C Holm (Sweden) B Holmström	3	6
2	(United States) T Gorman (United States) S Smith	6	7

Quarterfinals
(Hungary) R Machán (Hungary) B Taróczy	0	6
(Australia) B Carmichael (South Africa) F McMillan	6	7
(Australia) B Phillips-Moore (Pakistan) H Rahim	4	6	6
2	(United States) T Gorman (United States) S Smith	6	2	4

Semifinals
(Australia) B Carmichael (South Africa) F McMillan	4	6	7
(Australia) B Phillips-Moore (Pakistan) H Rahim	6	3	5
