= 1974 Stockholm Open – Singles =

Singles
- 1974 Stockholm Open

Final
- Champion: (United States) Arthur Ashe
- Runner-up: (Netherlands) Tom Okker
- Score: 6–2, 6–2

Details
- Draw: 64
- Seeds: 16

Events
Singles	Doubles
← 1973 ·	Stockholm Open	· 1975 →

Tom Gorman was the defending champion but withdrew due to an ankle injury sustained playing in the Vienna Open.

Arthur Ashe won the title, defeating Tom Okker 6–2, 6–2 in the final.

== Seeds ==
1. (Sweden) Björn Borg (semifinals)
2. (Argentina) Guillermo Vilas (semifinals)
3. (Netherlands) Tom Okker (final)
4. (United States) Arthur Ashe (champion)
5. (United States) Marty Riessen (quarterfinals)
6. (Czechoslovakia) Jan Kodeš (third round)
7. (Spain) Manuel Orantes (quarterfinals)
8. (United States) ~~Tom Gorman~~ (withdrew)
9. (United States) Harold Solomon (third round)
10. (United States) Eddie Dibbs (second round)
11. (Mexico) Raúl Ramírez (quarterfinals)
12. (Chile) Jaime Fillol (third round)
13. N/A
14. (United States) Brian Gottfried (third round)
15. (India) Vijay Amritraj (third round)
16. (Spain) Juan Gisbert Sr. (quarterfinals)

== Draw ==
=== Key ===
- Q = Qualifier
- WC = Wild card
- LL = Lucky loser
- Alt = Alternate
- ITF = ITF entry
- PR = Protected ranking
- SR = Special ranking
- SE = Special exempt
- JE = Junior exempt
- JR = Junior Accelerator Programme entrant
- CO = College Accelerator Programme entrant
- NG = Next Gen Accelerator Program entrant
- w/o = Walkover
- r = Retired
- d = Defaulted

=== Finals ===
Semifinals
1	(Sweden) Björn Borg	4	7	6
3	(Netherlands) Tom Okker	6	5	7
4	(United States) Arthur Ashe	6	6
2	(Argentina) Guillermo Vilas	4	4

Final
3	(Netherlands) Tom Okker	2	2
4	(United States) Arthur Ashe	6	6

=== Top half ===
==== Section 1 ====
First round
1	(Sweden) B Borg	6	6
(India) A Amritraj	3	2
(United States) P Gerken	6	6
(Mexico) J Loyo-Mayo	4	1
(Brazil) LF Tavares	7	7
(Sweden) M Carlstein	5	6
(India) S Menon	6	6
14	(United States) B Gottfried	7	7
9	(United States) H Solomon	6	6
(Sweden) B Åberg	4	3
(Netherlands) R Thung	7	2	4
(United Kingdom) J Lloyd	6	6	6
(Sweden) B Holmström	6	2
(United States) J Borowiak	7	6
(United States) E van Dillen	3	4
7	(Spain) M Orantes	6	6

Second round
1	(Sweden) B Borg	1	6	7
(United States) P Gerken	6	1	6
(Brazil) LF Tavares	3	2
14	(United States) B Gottfried	6	6
9	(United States) H Solomon	4	7	6
(United Kingdom) J Lloyd	6	5	2
(United States) J Borowiak	6	2
7	(Spain) M Orantes	7	6

Third round
1	(Sweden) B Borg	6	6
14	(United States) B Gottfried	4	1
9	(United States) H Solomon	0	2
7	(Spain) M Orantes	6	6

Quarterfinals
1	(Sweden) B Borg	6	6
7	(Spain) M Orantes	1	1

==== Section 2 ====
First round
5	(United States) M Riessen	6	6
(Australia) B Phillips-Moore	1	4
(Sweden) B Andersson	4	6	6
(South Africa) R Moore	6	2	3
(United Kingdom) M Farrell	3	4
(Brazil) T Koch	6	6
(Czechoslovakia) M Holeček	2	5
10	(United States) E Dibbs	6	7
12	(Chile) J Fillol	6	3	6
(Colombia) J Velasco Sr.	2	6	0
(Denmark) T Christensen	2	1
(Sweden) R Norberg	6	6
(South Africa) B Hewitt	7	6
(Sweden) U Eriksson	5	3
(Sweden) K Johansson	7	6	4
3	(Netherlands) T Okker	5	7	6

Second round
5	(United States) M Riessen	6	3	6
(Sweden) B Andersson	1	6	4
(Brazil) T Koch	6	6
10	(United States) E Dibbs	0	0
12	(Chile) J Fillol	6	2	7
(Sweden) R Norberg	2	6	6
(South Africa) B Hewitt	6	3
3	(Netherlands) T Okker	7	6

Third round
5	(United States) M Riessen	7	6
(Brazil) T Koch	6	4
12	(Chile) J Fillol	6	1
3	(Netherlands) T Okker	7	6

Quarterfinals
5	(United States) M Riessen	6	4
3	(Netherlands) T Okker	7	6

=== Bottom half ===
==== Section 3 ====
First round
4	(United States) A Ashe	6	7
(United States) V Gerulaitis	4	6
(Sweden) J Källqvist	2	0
(Colombia) I Molina	6	6
(Sweden) J Zabrodsky	1	4
(Pakistan) H Rahim	6	6
(Austria) H Kary	5	4
15	(India) V Amritraj	7	6
16	(Spain) J Gisbert Sr.	6	6
(Sweden) D Palm	4	4
(United States) R Fisher	6	4
(Poland) W Fibak	7	6
(West Germany) K Meiler	6	6
(Italy) A Zugarelli	4	2
(Italy) V Franchitti	2	1
6	(Czechoslovakia) J Kodeš	6	6

Second round
4	(United States) A Ashe	4	6	6
(Colombia) I Molina	6	1	2
(Pakistan) H Rahim	3	6
15	(India) V Amritraj	6	7
16	(Spain) J Gisbert Sr.	6	4	6
(Poland) W Fibak	2	6	4
(West Germany) K Meiler	7	1	1
6	(Czechoslovakia) J Kodeš	6	6	6

Third round
4	(United States) A Ashe	7	7
15	(India) V Amritraj	6	6
16	(Spain) J Gisbert Sr.	6	6
6	(Czechoslovakia) J Kodeš	3	2

Quarterfinals
4	(United States) A Ashe	6	6
16	(Spain) J Gisbert Sr.	1	3

==== Section 4 ====
First round
(Finland) G Berner	4	4
(Sweden) Jan-Erik Lundqvist	6	6
(Sweden) T Svensson	3	6
(Sweden) O Bengtson	6	7
(United States) C Pasarell	4	6	7
(Finland) M Timonen	6	3	5
(Rhodesia) R Dowdeswell	7	4	3
11	(Mexico) R Ramírez	5	6	6
(France) F Jauffret	6	6
(Finland) P Säilä	4	0
(South Africa) F McMillan	6	3	6
(Australia) R Keldie	3	6	4
(United States) S Krulevitz	4	7	4
(Chile) P Cornejo	6	6	6
(India) J Singh	2	0
2	(Argentina) G Vilas	6	6

Second round
(Sweden) J-E Lundqvist	6	3	6
(Sweden) O Bengtson	4	6	7
(United States) C Pasarell	6	1	4
11	(Mexico) R Ramírez	3	6	6
(France) F Jauffret	6	5	1
(South Africa) F McMillan	2	7	6
(Chile) P Cornejo	3	5
2	(Argentina) G Vilas	6	7

Third round
(Sweden) O Bengtson	5	3
11	(Mexico) R Ramírez	7	6
(South Africa) F McMillan	4	0
2	(Argentina) G Vilas	6	6

Quarterfinals
11	(Mexico) R Ramírez	4	2
2	(Argentina) G Vilas	6	6
