= 1974 Stockholm Open – Doubles =

Tennis tournament

Doubles
- 1974 Stockholm Open

Final
- Champions: (Netherlands) Tom Okker (United States) Marty Riessen
- Runners-up: (South Africa) Bob Hewitt (South Africa) Frew McMillan
- Score: 2–6, 6–3, 6–4

Events
Singles	Doubles
← 1973 ·	Stockholm Open	· 1975 →

Jimmy Connors and Ilie Năstase were the defending champions, but Riessen did not participate this year. Okker partnered Arthur Ashe, losing in the quarterfinals.

Tom Okker and Marty Riessen won the title, defeating Bob Hewitt and Frew McMillan 2–6, 6–3, 6–4 in the final.

== Seeds ==
1. (South Africa) Bob Hewitt / (South Africa) Frew McMillan (final)
2. (Netherlands) Tom Okker / (United States) Marty Riessen (champions)

== Draw ==
=== Key ===
- Q = Qualifier
- WC = Wild card
- LL = Lucky loser
- Alt = Alternate
- ITF = ITF entry
- PR = Protected ranking
- SR = Special ranking
- SE = Special exempt
- JE = Junior exempt
- JR = Junior Accelerator Programme entrant
- CO = College Accelerator Programme entrant
- NG = Next Gen Accelerator Program entrant
- w/o = Walkover
- r = Retired
- d = Defaulted

=== Finals ===
Semifinals
1	(South Africa) Bob Hewitt (South Africa) Frew McMillan	6	3	6
(Sweden) Rolf Norberg (Sweden) Tenny Svensson	3	6	3
(United States) Charlie Pasarell (United States) Erik van Dillen	5	5
2	(Netherlands) Tom Okker (United States) Marty Riessen	7	7

Final
1	(South Africa) Bob Hewitt (South Africa) Frew McMillan	6	3	4
2	(Netherlands) Tom Okker (United States) Marty Riessen	2	6	6

=== Top half ===
First round
1	(South Africa) B Hewitt (South Africa) F McMillan	6	6
(United States) V Gerulaitis (South Africa) R Moore	4	3
(United States) P Gerken (Israel) S Krulevitz	2	4
(Sweden) ON Bengtson (Sweden) J-E Lundqvist	6	6
(United States) J Borowiak (Rhodesia) R Dowdeswell	6	6
(Finland) Mikko Horsma (Finland) M Timonen	2	1
(United States) E Dibbs (United States) H Solomon	2	3
(United States) A Ashe (Czechoslovakia) J Kodeš	6	6
(Sweden) B Borg (Spain) J Gisbert Sr.	6	6	6
(United Kingdom) M Farrell (United Kingdom) J Lloyd	1	7	7
(Sweden) B Andersson (Sweden) D Palm	4	6	2
(Sweden) R Norberg (Sweden) T Svensson	6	3	6
(United States) R Fisher (Australia) R Keldie	4	4
(Czechoslovakia) M Holeček (West Germany) K Meiler	6	6
(Italy) V Franchitti (Italy) A Zugarelli	2	6
(United States) B Gottfried (Mexico) R Ramírez	6	7

Second round
1	(South Africa) B Hewitt (South Africa) F McMillan	6	6
(Sweden) ON Bengtson (Sweden) J-E Lundqvist	4	0
(United States) J Borowiak (Rhodesia) R Dowdeswell	6	6	3
(United States) A Ashe (Czechoslovakia) J Kodeš	7	2	6
(United Kingdom) M Farrell (United Kingdom) J Lloyd	4	6	6
(Sweden) R Norberg (Sweden) T Svensson	6	4	7
(Czechoslovakia) M Holeček (West Germany) K Meiler	7	0	7
(United States) B Gottfried (Mexico) R Ramírez	6	6	5

Quarterfinals
1	(South Africa) B Hewitt (South Africa) F McMillan	5	7	7
(United States) A Ashe (Czechoslovakia) J Kodeš	7	5	6
(Sweden) R Norberg (Sweden) T Svensson	6	4	7
(Czechoslovakia) M Holeček (West Germany) K Meiler	4	6	6

Semifinals
1	(South Africa) B Hewitt (South Africa) F McMillan	6	3	6
(Sweden) R Norberg (Sweden) T Svensson	3	6	3

=== Bottom half ===
First round
(Spain) M Orantes (Argentina) G Vilas	6	5	6
(India) S Menon (India) J Singh	4	7	4
(Denmark) T Christensen (Sweden) T Larsen	3	4
(France) F Jauffret (Sweden) K Johansson	6	6
(Sweden) B Åberg (Sweden) B Holmström	1	2
(Australia) B Phillips-Moore (Pakistan) H Rahim	6	6
(Sweden) U Eriksson (Sweden) J Källqvist	4	3
(United States) C Pasarell (United States) E van Dillen	6	6
(Chile) P Cornejo (Chile) J Fillol	6	3
(India) A Amritraj (India) V Amritraj	7	6
(Colombia) I Molina (Colombia) J Velasco Sr.	6	6
(Poland) W Fibak (Austria) H Kary	2	2
(Netherlands) R Thung (Sweden) J Zabrodsky	6	6
(Brazil) T Koch (Brazil) LF Tavares	3	3
(Australia) J Bartlett (Mexico) J-L Mayo	3	3
2	(Netherlands) T Okker (United States) M Riessen	6	6

Second round
(Spain) M Orantes (Argentina) G Vilas	3	7	3
(France) F Jauffret (Sweden) K Johansson	6	6	6
(Australia) B Phillips-Moore (Pakistan) H Rahim	3	6	6
(United States) C Pasarell (United States) E van Dillen	6	3	7
(India) A Amritraj (India) V Amritraj	6	3
(Colombia) I Molina (Colombia) J Velasco Sr.	7	6
(Netherlands) R Thung (Sweden) J Zabrodsky	3	3
2	(Netherlands) T Okker (United States) M Riessen	6	6

Quarterfinals
(France) F Jauffret (Sweden) K Johansson	7	2	6
(United States) C Pasarell (United States) E van Dillen	6	6	7
(Colombia) I Molina (Colombia) J Velasco Sr.	1	2
2	(Netherlands) T Okker (United States) M Riessen	6	6

Semifinals
(United States) C Pasarell (United States) E van Dillen	5	5
2	(Netherlands) T Okker (United States) M Riessen	7	7
