= 1975 Stockholm Open – Men's doubles =

Men's doubles
- 1975 Stockholm Open

Final
- Champions: (South Africa) Bob Hewitt (South Africa) Frew McMillan
- Runners-up: (United States) Charlie Pasarell (United States) Roscoe Tanner
- Score: 3–6, 6–3, 6–4

Events
Singles	men	women
Doubles	men	women
← 1974 ·	Stockholm Open	· 1976 →

Tom Okker and Marty Riessen were the defending champions, but Riessen did not participate this year. Okker partnered Arthur Ashe, losing in the quarterfinals.

Bob Hewitt and Frew McMillan won the doubles title at the 1975 Stockholm Open tennis tournament, defeating Charlie Pasarell and Roscoe Tanner 3–6, 6–3, 6–4 in the final.

== Seeds ==
1. (United States) Jimmy Connors / (Romania) Ilie Năstase (quarterfinals)
2. (United States) Fred McNair / (United States) Sherwood Stewart (quarterfinals)

== Draw ==
=== Key ===
- Q = Qualifier
- WC = Wild card
- LL = Lucky loser
- Alt = Alternate
- ITF = ITF entry
- PR = Protected ranking
- SR = Special ranking
- SE = Special exempt
- JE = Junior exempt
- JR = Junior Accelerator Programme entrant
- CO = College Accelerator Programme entrant
- NG = Next Gen Accelerator Program entrant
- w/o = Walkover
- r = Retired
- d = Defaulted

=== Finals ===
Semifinals
(United States) Charlie Pasarell (United States) Roscoe Tanner	5	6	7
(Poland) Wojtek Fibak (West Germany) Karl Meiler	7	3	5
(Sweden) Ove Nils Bengtson (Sweden) Björn Borg	5	3
(South Africa) Bob Hewitt (South Africa) Frew McMillan	7	6

Final
(United States) Charlie Pasarell (United States) Roscoe Tanner	6	3	4
(South Africa) Bob Hewitt (South Africa) Frew McMillan	3	6	6

=== Top half ===
First round
1	(United States) J Connors (Romania) I Năstase	6	6
(United States) A Neely (Sweden) Peter Rosen	3	2
(United Kingdom) J Lloyd (United Kingdom) G Stilwell	2	6	7
(United Kingdom) J Feaver (West Germany) U Pinner	6	3	5
(United States) C Pasarell (United States) R Tanner	6	7	7
(Socialist Federal Republic of Yugoslavia) Ž Franulović (New Zealand) O Parun	7	5	6
(Colombia) I Molina (Paraguay) V Pecci	6	7
(Sweden) B Andersson (Venezuela) J Andrew	4	6
(Poland) W Fibak (West Germany) K Meiler	6	6
(Sweden) J Källqvist (India) B Nunna	0	4
(United States) J McManus (Spain) A Muñoz	6	7
(Czechoslovakia) P Hutka (Sweden) L Johansson	2	5
(United States) D Stockton (United States) E van Dillen	6	6
(United States) E Dibbs (Israel) S Krulevitz	4	3
(United States) V Amaya (United States) G Hardie	6	6
(United States) J Borowiak (Pakistan) H Rahim	3	4

Second round
1	(United States) J Connors (Romania) I Năstase	6	3	6
(United Kingdom) J Lloyd (United Kingdom) G Stilwell	3	6	2
(United States) C Pasarell (United States) R Tanner	6	6
(Colombia) I Molina (Paraguay) V Pecci	3	2
(Poland) W Fibak (West Germany) K Meiler	6	6
(United States) J McManus (Spain) A Muñoz	4	2
(United States) D Stockton (United States) E van Dillen	6	7
(United States) V Amaya (United States) G Hardie	3	6

Quarterfinals
1	(United States) J Connors (Romania) I Năstase	6	1
(United States) C Pasarell (United States) R Tanner	7	6
(Poland) W Fibak (West Germany) K Meiler	1	6	6
(United States) D Stockton (United States) E van Dillen	6	4	3

Semifinals
(United States) C Pasarell (United States) R Tanner	5	6	7
(Poland) W Fibak (West Germany) K Meiler	7	3	5

=== Bottom half ===
First round
(United Kingdom) C Dowdeswell (South Africa) B Mitton	6	6
(United States) J Austin (India) S Menon	3	4
(Egypt) I El Shafei (South Africa) R Moore	3	1
(United States) A Ashe (Poland) W Fibak	6	6
(United States) R Kreiss (United States) S Segura	1	4
(Sweden) ON Bengtson (Sweden) B Borg	6	6
(Sweden) D Palm (Sweden) J Zabrodsky	6	4
(Czechoslovakia) J Hřebec (Czechoslovakia) J Kodeš	7	6
(United States) V Gerulaitis (United States) T Waltke	3	7	6
(United Kingdom) B Mottram (United Kingdom) R Taylor	6	6	0
(Sweden) R Norberg (Sweden) T Svensson	4	1
(South Africa) B Hewitt (South Africa) F McMillan	6	6
(Czechoslovakia) F Pala (Czechoslovakia) V Zedník	6	7
(Austria) H Kary (Australia) B Phillips-Moore	2	5
(United States) M Estep (United States) M Machette	6	6	6
2	(United States) F McNair (United States) S Stewart	7	3	7

Second round
(United Kingdom) C Dowdeswell (South Africa) B Mitton	3	5
(United States) A Ashe (Poland) W Fibak	6	7
(Sweden) ON Bengtson (Sweden) B Borg	4	6	6
(Czechoslovakia) J Hřebec (Czechoslovakia) J Kodeš	6	4	2
(United States) V Gerulaitis (United States) T Waltke	1	4
(South Africa) B Hewitt (South Africa) F McMillan	6	6
(Czechoslovakia) F Pala (Czechoslovakia) V Zedník	7	2	4
2	(United States) F McNair (United States) S Stewart	6	6	6

Quarterfinals
(United States) A Ashe (Poland) W Fibak	6	3
(Sweden) ON Bengtson (Sweden) B Borg	7	6
(South Africa) B Hewitt (South Africa) F McMillan	4	6	6
2	(United States) F McNair (United States) S Stewart	6	1	4

Semifinals
(Sweden) ON Bengtson (Sweden) B Borg	5	3
(South Africa) B Hewitt (South Africa) F McMillan	7	6
