= 1972 Stockholm Open – Singles =

Singles
- 1972 Stockholm Open

Final
- Champion: (United States) Stan Smith
- Runner-up: (Netherlands) Tom Okker
- Score: 6–4, 6–3

Details
- Draw: 56
- Seeds: 4

Events
Singles	Doubles
← 1971 ·	Stockholm Open	· 1973 →

Arthur Ashe was the defending champion, but did not participate this year.

Stan Smith won the title, defeating Tom Okker 6–4, 6–3 in the final.

== Seeds ==
1. (United States) Stan Smith (champion)
2. (Romania) Ilie Năstase (semifinals)
3. (Netherlands) Tom Okker (final)
4. (United States) Marty Riessen (semifinals)

== Draw ==
=== Key ===
- Q = Qualifier
- WC = Wild card
- LL = Lucky loser
- Alt = Alternate
- ITF = ITF entry
- PR = Protected ranking
- SR = Special ranking
- SE = Special exempt
- JE = Junior exempt
- JR = Junior Accelerator Programme entrant
- CO = College Accelerator Programme entrant
- NG = Next Gen Accelerator Program entrant
- w/o = Walkover
- r = Retired
- d = Defaulted

=== Finals ===
Semifinals
1	(United States) Stan Smith	6	3	6
4	(United States) Marty Riessen	4	6	2
3	(Netherlands) Tom Okker	6	6	6
2	(Romania) Ilie Năstase	4	7	4

Final
1	(United States) Stan Smith	6	6
3	(Netherlands) Tom Okker	4	3

=== Top half ===
==== Section 1 ====
First round
(Czechoslovakia) J Kodeš	6	6
(Sweden) T Svensson	2	3
(Australia) B Carmichael	2	4
(Australia) J Alexander	6	6
(Australia) T Addison	7	1	4
(Socialist Federal Republic of Yugoslavia) N Pilić	6	6	6
(Czechoslovakia) V Zedník	1	2
(Chile) J Fillol	6	6

Second round
1	(United States) S Smith	6	7	6
(Sweden) ON Bengtson	7	5	4
(United States) J McManus	6	6
(New Zealand) O Parun	1	2
(Czechoslovakia) J Kodeš	6	3	7
(Australia) J Alexander	1	6	5
(Socialist Federal Republic of Yugoslavia) N Pilić	6	7
(Chile) J Fillol	4	5

Third round
1	(United States) S Smith	6	6
(United States) J McManus	4	4
(Czechoslovakia) J Kodeš	4	5
(Socialist Federal Republic of Yugoslavia) N Pilić	6	7

Quarterfinals
1	(United States) S Smith	6	7
(Socialist Federal Republic of Yugoslavia) N Pilić	3	6

==== Section 2 ====
First round
(Sweden) B Holmström	5	6	6
(United States) F Froehling	7	2	7
(Sweden) L Johansson	6	3	3
(Romania) I Țiriac	3	6	6
(Australia) A Stone	4	7	7
(Australia) C Dibley	6	6	6
(South Africa) F McMillan	4	6	5
(United Kingdom) R Taylor	6	4	7
4	(United States) M Riessen	6	7
(Australia) P Dent	3	6
(Spain) J Gisbert Sr.	6	7
(Sweden) K Johansson	3	6
(South Africa) R Maud	3	4
(United States) T Leonard	6	6
(New Zealand) B Fairlie	6	6	7
(United States) C Richey	7	4	6

Second round
(United States) F Froehling	6	7
(Romania) I Țiriac	4	6
(Australia) A Stone	4	3
(United Kingdom) R Taylor	6	6
4	(United States) M Riessen	w/o
(Spain) J Gisbert Sr.
(United States) T Leonard	3	4
(New Zealand) B Fairlie	6	6

Third round
(United States) F Froehling	2	1
(United Kingdom) R Taylor	6	6
4	(United States) M Riessen	6	7
(New Zealand) B Fairlie	3	5

Quarterfinals
(United Kingdom) R Taylor	4	6	3
4	(United States) M Riessen	6	3	6

=== Bottom half ===
==== Section 3 ====
First round
(Pakistan) H Rahim	6	3	6
(Czechoslovakia) F Pala	4	6	2
(United States) A Pattison	6	7
(United States) D Stockton	3	6
(Sweden) B Borg	7	7
(Finland) P Säilä	5	5
(Spain) A Gimeno	6	6
(United Kingdom) G Battrick	0	2
(United States) J Borowiak	6	6
(Sweden) B Andersson	3	0
(Australia) B Phillips-Moore	6	0
(Australia) R Emerson	7	6
(United States) J Connors	6	6
(Egypt) I El Shafei	4	4
(West Germany) H Engert	3	3
3	(Netherlands) T Okker	6	6

Second round
(Pakistan) H Rahim	5	6	5
(United States) A Pattison	7	2	7
(Sweden) B Borg	6	6
(Spain) A Gimeno	2	3
(United States) J Borowiak	6	7
(Australia) R Emerson	3	6
(United States) J Connors	2	6	3
3	(Netherlands) T Okker	6	1	6

Third round
(United States) A Pattison	4	6	6
(Sweden) B Borg	6	2	3
(United States) J Borowiak	6	2
3	(Netherlands) T Okker	7	6

Quarterfinals
(United States) A Pattison	3	2
3	(Netherlands) T Okker	6	6

==== Section 4 ====
First round
(Sweden) H Zahr	6	6	3
(Belgium) B Mignot	4	7	6
(Italy) C Barazzutti	6	6	6
(Sweden) D Palm	4	7	2
(United Kingdom) G Stilwell	3	4
(Sweden) R Norberg	6	6
(United States) Tom Gorman	7	2	2
(South Africa) C Drysdale	6	6	6

Second round
(Belgium) B Mignot	3	6	6
(Italy) C Barazzutti	6	4	3
(Sweden) R Norberg	3	4
(South Africa) C Drysdale	6	6
(France) P Barthès	6	6
(United States) R Barth	4	1
(Sweden) K Andersson	4	3
2	(Romania) I Năstase	6	6

Third round
(Belgium) B Mignot	4	3
(South Africa) C Drysdale	6	6
(France) P Barthès	5	1
2	(Romania) I Năstase	7	6

Quarterfinals
(South Africa) C Drysdale	3	4
2	(Romania) I Năstase	6	6
