= 1973 Stockholm Open – Singles =

Singles
- 1973 Stockholm Open

Final
- Champion: (United States) Tom Gorman
- Runner-up: (Sweden) Björn Borg
- Score: 6–3, 4–6, 7–6

Details
- Draw: 48

Events
Singles	Doubles
← 1972 ·	Stockholm Open	· 1974 →

Stan Smith was the defending champion, but lost in the quarterfinals this year.

Tom Gorman won the title, defeating Björn Borg 6–3, 4–6, 7–6 in the final.

== Seeds ==
1. (United States) Stan Smith (quarterfinals)
2. (Romania) Ilie Năstase (third round)

== Draw ==
=== Key ===
- Q = Qualifier
- WC = Wild card
- LL = Lucky loser
- Alt = Alternate
- ITF = ITF entry
- PR = Protected ranking
- SR = Special ranking
- SE = Special exempt
- JE = Junior exempt
- JR = Junior Accelerator Programme entrant
- CO = College Accelerator Programme entrant
- NG = Next Gen Accelerator Program entrant
- w/o = Walkover
- r = Retired
- d = Defaulted

=== Finals ===
Semifinals
(United States) Tom Gorman	6	3	6
(Netherlands) Tom Okker	4	6	1
(United States) Jimmy Connors	4	6	6
(Sweden) Björn Borg	6	3	7

Final
(United States) Tom Gorman	6	4	7
(Sweden) Björn Borg	3	6	6

=== Top half ===
==== Section 1 ====
First round
(Sweden) C Holm	4	4
(United Kingdom) G Stilwell	6	6
(Sweden) J Zabrodsky	7	5	6
(Sweden) B Holmström	5	7	7
(Romania) I Țiriac	6	4	1
(Sweden) K Johansson	4	6	6
(Australia) B Carmichael	6	6
(Sweden) T Svensson	4	2

Second round
1	(United States) S Smith	6	7
(United Kingdom) G Stilwell	3	6
(Sweden) B Holmström	6	6	4
(South Africa) R Moore	7	4	6
(United States) M Riessen	7	6
(Sweden) K Johansson	6	0
(Australia) B Carmichael	5	7	3
(United States) T Gorman	7	6	6

Third round
1	(United States) S Smith	6	6
(South Africa) R Moore	3	1
(United States) M Riessen	3	6
(United States) T Gorman	6	7

Quarterfinals
1	(United States) S Smith	6	7	4
(United States) T Gorman	7	6	6

==== Section 2 ====
First round
(Italy) A Zugarelli	3	3
(South Africa) F McMillan	6	6
(Colombia) I Molina	2	6	6
(Hungary) R Machán	6	2	4
(France) P Dominguez	3	1
(Sweden) L Johansson	6	6
(Chile) J Pinto Bravo	6	1	2
(Italy) C Barazzutti	2	6	6

Second round
(United States) A Ashe	6	6
(South Africa) F McMillan	3	4
(Colombia) I Molina	3	3
(West Germany) K Meiler	6	6
(United States) R Tanner
(Sweden) L Johansson	w/o
(Italy) C Barazzutti	1	1
(Netherlands) T Okker	6	6

Third round
(United States) A Ashe	w/o
(West Germany) K Meiler
(Sweden) L Johansson	6	3	6
(Netherlands) T Okker	4	6	7

Quarterfinals
(United States) A Ashe	4	6	3
(Netherlands) T Okker	6	2	6

=== Bottom half ===
==== Section 3 ====
First round
(United Kingdom) B Mottram	6	3	4
(Pakistan) H Rahim	3	6	6
(Finland) P Säilä	4	1
(Sweden) ON Bengtson	6	6
(United States) J Borowiak	0	6	7
(Australia) B Phillips-Moore	6	3	5
(Sweden) J Norbäck	0	2
(United Kingdom) G Battrick	6	6

Second round
(Spain) M Orantes	2	7	6
(Pakistan) H Rahim	6	5	3
(Sweden) ON Bengtson	7	4	4
(New Zealand) O Parun	6	6	6
(United Kingdom) M Cox	6	6	5
(United States) J Borowiak	0	7	7
(United Kingdom) G Battrick	2	4
(United States) J Connors	6	6

Third round
(Spain) M Orantes	6	6
(New Zealand) O Parun	1	4
(United States) J Borowiak	6	1
(United States) J Connors	7	6

Quarterfinals
(Spain) M Orantes	2	1
(United States) J Connors	6	6

==== Section 4 ====
First round
(Spain) A Muñoz	6	4	6
(Sweden) D Palm	3	6	3
(Sweden) R Norberg	5	6	3
(Hungary) B Taróczy	7	2	6
(West Germany) H-J Pohmann	3	2
(Sweden) B Andersson	6	6
(Sweden) O Palmer	7	6
(Sweden) T Larsen	6	1

Second round
(Socialist Federal Republic of Yugoslavia) N Pilić	4	6	6
(Spain) A Muñoz	6	3	3
(Hungary) B Taróczy	3	3
(Chile) J Fillol	6	6
(Sweden) B Borg	3	7	6
(Sweden) B Andersson	6	6	0
(Sweden) O Palmer	2	2
2	(Romania) I Năstase	6	6

Third round
(Socialist Federal Republic of Yugoslavia) N Pilić	6	7
(Chile) J Fillol	3	6
(Sweden) B Borg	6	4	7
2	(Romania) I Năstase	2	6	5

Quarterfinals
(Socialist Federal Republic of Yugoslavia) N Pilić	5	6	4
(Sweden) B Borg	7	4	6
