= 1973 Swedish Open – Doubles =

Doubles
- 1973 Swedish Open

Final
- Champion: (Socialist Federal Republic of Yugoslavia) Nikola Pilić (United States) Stan Smith
- Runner-up: (Australia) Bob Carmichael (South Africa) Frew McMillan
- Score: 2–6, 6–4, 6–4

Details
- Draw: 32

Events
Singles	Doubles
- Swedish Open

The 1973 Swedish Open – Doubles event was part of the 1973 Swedish Open tennis tournament and was played on outdoor clay courts in Båstad, Sweden, between 8 July and 15 July 1973. Nikola Pilić and Stan Smith won the doubles title by defeating Bob Carmichael and Frew McMillan 2–6, 6–4, 6–4 in the final.

== Draw ==
Key

- Q = Qualifier
- WC = Wild card
- LL = Lucky loser
- Alt = Alternate
- ITF = ITF entry
- PR = Protected ranking
- SR = Special ranking
- SE = Special exempt
- JE = Junior exempt
- JR = Junior Accelerator Programme entrant
- CO = College Accelerator Programme entrant
- NG = Next Gen Accelerator Program entrant
- w/o = Walkover
- r = Retired
- d = Defaulted

=== Finals ===
Semifinals
(Croatia) Nikola Pilić (United States) Stan Smith	7	6
(Spain) Manuel Orantes (Brazil) Francisco Pinto	6	2
(India) Anand Amritraj (India) Vijay Amritraj	2	4
(Australia) Bob Carmichael (South Africa) Frew McMillan	6	6

Final
(Croatia) Nikola Pilić (United States) Stan Smith	2	6	6
(Australia) Bob Carmichael (South Africa) Frew McMillan	6	4	4

=== Top half ===
First Round
(Croatia) Nikola Pilić (United States) Stan Smith
BYE
(Chile) Patricio Cornejo (Argentina) Alejandro Ganzábal	6	6
(Sweden) Kjell Johansson (Sweden) Jan Zabrodsky	3	4
(United Kingdom) Gerald Battrick (Australia) Ian Fletcher	6	7
(Sweden) Birger Andersson (Sweden) Tenny Svensson	2	5
(Colombia) Iván Molina (Argentina) Guillermo Vilas
BYE
(Spain) Manuel Orantes (Brazil) Francisco Pinto
BYE
(Australia) Ross Case (Australia) Geoff Masters
BYE
(Italy) Pietro Marzano (Italy) Tonino Zugarelli	6	6
(Sweden) Birger Folke (Czechoslovakia) Jan Kukal	3	3
(United States) Jeff Borowiak (Pakistan) Haroon Rahim
BYE

Second Round
(Croatia) Nikola Pilić (United States) Stan Smith	6	3	6
(Chile) Patricio Cornejo (Argentina) Alejandro Ganzábal	4	6	2
(United Kingdom) Gerald Battrick (Australia) Ian Fletcher	6	4	7
(Colombia) Iván Molina (Argentina) Guillermo Vilas	1	6	5
(Spain) Manuel Orantes (Brazil) Francisco Pinto	w/o
(Australia) Ross Case (Australia) Geoff Masters
(Italy) Pietro Marzano (Italy) Tonino Zugarelli	6	6
(United States) Jeff Borowiak (Pakistan) Haroon Rahim	4	4

Quarterfinals
(Croatia) Nikola Pilić (United States) Stan Smith	6	6
(United Kingdom) Gerald Battrick (Australia) Ian Fletcher	0	2
(Spain) Manuel Orantes (Brazil) Francisco Pinto	6	6	6
(Italy) Pietro Marzano (Italy) Tonino Zugarelli	4	7	4

Semifinals
(Croatia) Nikola Pilić (United States) Stan Smith	7	6
(Spain) Manuel Orantes (Brazil) Francisco Pinto	6	2

=== Bottom half ===
First Round
(India) Anand Amritraj (India) Vijay Amritraj
BYE
(Sweden) Björn Borg (Sweden) Rolf Norberg
BYE
(Sweden) Ove Bengtson (United States) Jim McManus
BYE
(United States) Chico Hagey (Mexico) Raúl Ramírez	7	7
(United States) Chuck McKinley (Socialist Federal Republic of Yugoslavia)	6	5
(Austria) Hans Kary (Italy) Martin Mulligan
BYE
(Italy) Corrado Barazzutti (United Kingdom) Buster Mottram	6	6
(Sweden) Per Jemsby (Finland) Matti Timonen	4	2
(France) Georges Goven (Mexico) Joaquín Loyo-Mayo	6	7
(Sweden) Leif Johansson (Socialist Federal Republic of Yugoslavia)	4	6
BYE
(Australia) Bob Carmichael (South Africa) Frew McMillan

Second Round
(India) Anand Amritraj (India) Vijay Amritraj	6	6
(Sweden) Björn Borg (Sweden) Rolf Norberg	2	2
(Sweden) Ove Bengtson (United States) Jim McManus	6	3	6
(United States) Chico Hagey (Mexico) Raúl Ramírez	2	6	3
(Austria) Hans Kary (Italy) Martin Mulligan	7	6
(Italy) Corrado Barazzutti (United Kingdom) Buster Mottram	6	3
(France) Georges Goven (Mexico) Joaquín Loyo-Mayo	4	6	2
(Australia) Bob Carmichael (South Africa) Frew McMillan	6	4	6

Quarterfinals
(India) Anand Amritraj (India) Vijay Amritraj	7	2	6
(Sweden) Ove Bengtson (United States) Jim McManus	5	6	3
(Austria) Hans Kary (Italy) Martin Mulligan	4	6	2
(Australia) Bob Carmichael (South Africa) Frew McMillan	6	4	6

Semifinals
(India) Anand Amritraj (India) Vijay Amritraj	2	4
(Australia) Bob Carmichael (South Africa) Frew McMillan	6	6
