= 1972 Stockholm Open – Doubles =

Doubles
- 1972 Stockholm Open

Final
- Champions: (Netherlands) Tom Okker (United States) Marty Riessen
- Runners-up: (Australia) Roy Emerson (Australia) Colin Dibley
- Score: 7–5, 7–6

Details
- Draw: 26
- Seeds: 4

Events
Singles	Doubles
- Stockholm Open

Tom Gorman and Stan Smith were the defending champions, but lost in the semifinals this year.

Tom Okker and Marty Riessen won the title, defeating Roy Emerson and Colin Dibley 7–5, 7–6 in the final.

== Seeds ==
1. (United States) Tom Gorman / (United States) Stan Smith (semifinals)
2. (Netherlands) Tom Okker / (United States) Marty Riessen (champions)
3. (Czechoslovakia) Jan Kodeš / (Romania) Ilie Năstase (first round)
4. (South Africa) Cliff Drysdale / (United Kingdom) Roger Taylor (semifinals)

== Draw ==
Key

- Q = Qualifier
- WC = Wild card
- LL = Lucky loser
- Alt = Alternate
- ITF = ITF entry
- PR = Protected ranking
- SR = Special ranking
- SE = Special exempt
- JE = Junior exempt
- JR = Junior Accelerator Programme entrant
- CO = College Accelerator Programme entrant
- NG = Next Gen Accelerator Program entrant
- w/o = Walkover
- r = Retired
- d = Defaulted

=== Finals ===
Semifinals
1	(United States) Tom Gorman (United States) Stan Smith	4	3
(Australia) Colin Dibley (Australia) Roy Emerson	6	6
4	(South Africa) Cliff Drysdale (United Kingdom) Roger Taylor	4	2
2	(Netherlands) Tom Okker (United States) Marty Riessen	6	6

Final
(Australia) Colin Dibley (Australia) Roy Emerson	5	6
2	(Netherlands) Tom Okker (United States) Marty Riessen	7	7

=== Top half ===
First round
(Sweden) T Larsen (Sweden) R Norberg	6	7
(Sweden) B Folke (Sweden) T Hallberg	1	5
3	(Czechoslovakia) J Kodeš (Romania) I Năstase	0	5
(Australia) J Alexander (Australia) P Dent	6	7
(Sweden) Mikael Stig (Sweden) T Svensson	5	7	5
(United States) J Borowiak (Pakistan) H Rahim	7	5	7
(Spain) A Gimeno (Spain) J Gisbert Sr.	6	3	2
(Australia) C Dibley (Australia) R Emerson	4	6	6
(South Africa) F McMillan (United States) D Stockton	4	4
(United States) J Connors (Romania) I Țiriac	6	6

Second round
1	(United States) T Gorman (United States) S Smith	7	6
(South Africa) R Maud (United States) A Pattison	5	2
(Sweden) K Johansson (Sweden) L Johansson	6	6	6
(Sweden) T Larsen (Sweden) R Norberg	7	2	2
(Australia) J Alexander (Australia) P Dent	6	6	2
(United States) J Borowiak (Pakistan) H Rahim	3	7	6
(Australia) C Dibley (Australia) R Emerson	4	6	6
(United States) J Connors (Romania) I Țiriac	6	3	4

Quarterfinals
1	(United States) T Gorman (United States) S Smith	6	6
(Sweden) K Johansson (Sweden) L Johansson	3	2
(United States) J Borowiak (Pakistan) H Rahim	6	6
(Australia) C Dibley (Australia) R Emerson	7	7

Semifinals
1	(United States) T Gorman (United States) S Smith	4	3
(Australia) C Dibley (Australia) R Emerson	6	6

=== Bottom half ===
First round
(Egypt) I El Shafei (New Zealand) B Fairlie	7	6
(Sweden) B Andersson (Sweden) M Carlstein	6	1
(Czechoslovakia) F Pala (Czechoslovakia) V Zedník	0	2
(United Kingdom) G Battrick (United States) C Richey	6	6
(Sweden) ON Bengtson (Sweden) B Borg	3	3
(Australia) T Addison (Australia) B Carmichael	6	6
(Socialist Federal Republic of Yugoslavia) N Pilić (Australia) A Stone	6	6	4
4	(South Africa) C Drysdale (United Kingdom) R Taylor	7	4	6
(New Zealand) O Parun (Australia) B Phillips-Moore	6	6
(Chile) J Fillol (United States) J McManus	4	4

Second round
(Egypt) I El Shafei (New Zealand) B Fairlie	6	6	7
(United Kingdom) G Battrick (United States) C Richey	2	7	6
(Australia) T Addison (Australia) B Carmichael	2	3
4	(South Africa) C Drysdale (United Kingdom) R Taylor	6	6
(New Zealand) O Parun (Australia) B Phillips-Moore	4	3
(France) P Barthès (United States) F Froehling	6	6
(Sweden) C Holm (Sweden) D Palm	2	0
2	(Netherlands) T Okker (United States) M Riessen	6	6

Quarterfinals
(Egypt) I El Shafei (New Zealand) B Fairlie	3	4
4	(South Africa) C Drysdale (United Kingdom) R Taylor	6	6
(France) P Barthès (United States) F Froehling	2	6
2	(Netherlands) T Okker (United States) M Riessen	6	7

Semifinals
4	(South Africa) C Drysdale (United Kingdom) R Taylor	4	2
2	(Netherlands) T Okker (United States) M Riessen	6	6
