= 1974 Swedish Open – Doubles =

Doubles
- 1974 Swedish Open

Final
- Champion: (Italy) Paolo Bertolucci (Italy) Adriano Panatta
- Runner-up: (Sweden) Ove Nils Bengtson (Sweden) Björn Borg
- Score: 3–6, 6–2, 6–4

Details
- Draw: 16

Events
Singles	Doubles
- Swedish Open

The 1974 Swedish Open – Doubles event was part of the 1974 Swedish Open tennis tournament and was played on outdoor clay courts in Båstad, Sweden between 10 July and 16 July 1973. The draw consisted of 16 teams. Nikola Pilić and Stan Smith were the defending Swedish Open doubles champions but did not compete in this edition. Paolo Bertolucci and Adriano Panatta won the title by defeating Ove Nils Bengtson and Björn Borg in the final, 3–6, 6–2, 6–4.

== Draw ==
Key

- Q = Qualifier
- WC = Wild card
- LL = Lucky loser
- Alt = Alternate
- ITF = ITF entry
- PR = Protected ranking
- SR = Special ranking
- SE = Special exempt
- JE = Junior exempt
- JR = Junior Accelerator Programme entrant
- CO = College Accelerator Programme entrant
- NG = Next Gen Accelerator Program entrant
- w/o = Walkover
- r = Retired
- d = Defaulted

First Round
(Sweden) Björn Borg (Sweden) Ove Bengtson	6	6
(Sweden) Per Jemsby (Sweden) Håkan Zahr	1	3
(Argentina) Julián Ganzábal (Chile) Jaime Pinto Bravo	2	0
(Sweden) Kjell Johansson (Italy) Martin Mulligan	6	6
(Italy) Corrado Barazzutti (Italy) Tonino Zugarelli	6	3	5
(Sweden) Birger Andersson (Sweden) Bo Holmstrom	3	6	7
(Colombia) Iván Molina (Colombia) Jairo Velasco Sr.	6	3	6
(Austria) Hans Kary (New Zealand) Onny Parun	2	6	3
(Sweden) Leif Johansson (Sweden) Jan Zabrodsky	7	7
(Chile) Belus Prajoux (West Germany) Hans-Joachim Plötz	6	5
(Sweden) Terje Larsen (Sweden) Rolf Norberg	3	1
(Socialist Federal Republic of Yugoslavia) Željko Franulović (United States) Steve Krulevitz	6	6
(Poland) Wojciech Fibak (Poland) Tadeusz Nowicki	6	6
(Sweden) Hans Nerell (Sweden) Tenny Svensson	1	2
(Japan) Jun Kamiwazumi (United States) Fred McNair	3	6
(Italy) Paolo Bertolucci (Italy) Adriano Panatta	6	7

Quarterfinals
(Sweden) Björn Borg (Sweden) Ove Bengtson	6	6
(Sweden) Kjell Johansson (Italy) Martin Mulligan	3	1
(Sweden) Birger Andersson (Sweden) Bo Holmstrom	5	2
(Colombia) Iván Molina (Colombia) Jairo Velasco Sr.	7	6
(Sweden) Leif Johansson (Sweden) Jan Zabrodsky	6	2	2
(Socialist Federal Republic of Yugoslavia) Željko Franulović (United States) Steve Krulevitz	2	6	6
(Poland) Wojciech Fibak (Poland) Tadeusz Nowicki	7	4	4
(Italy) Paolo Bertolucci (Italy) Adriano Panatta	5	6	6

Semifinals
(Sweden) Björn Borg (Sweden) Ove Bengtson	6	7
(Colombia) Iván Molina (Colombia) Jairo Velasco Sr.	3	6
(Socialist Federal Republic of Yugoslavia) Željko Franulović (United States) Steve Krulevitz	4	3
(Italy) Paolo Bertolucci (Italy) Adriano Panatta	6	6

Final
(Sweden) Björn Borg (Sweden) Ove Bengtson	6	2	4
(Italy) Paolo Bertolucci (Italy) Adriano Panatta	3	6	6
