= 1974 Swedish Open – Singles =

Singles
- 1974 Swedish Open

Final
- Champion: (Sweden) Björn Borg
- Runner-up: (Italy) Adriano Panatta
- Score: 6–3, 6–0, 6–7^{(2–7)}, 6–3

Details
- Draw: 32

Events
Singles	Doubles
- Swedish Open

The 1974 Swedish Open – Singles event was part of the 1974 Swedish Open tennis tournament and was played on outdoor clay courts in Båstad, Sweden between 10 July and 16 July 1973. Stan Smith was the defending Swedish Open singles champion but did not compete in this edition. Björn Borg won the title by defeating Adriano Panatta in the final, 6–3, 6–0, 6–7^{(2–7)}, 6–3.

== Draw ==
Key

- Q = Qualifier
- WC = Wild card
- LL = Lucky loser
- Alt = Alternate
- ITF = ITF entry
- PR = Protected ranking
- SR = Special ranking
- SE = Special exempt
- JE = Junior exempt
- JR = Junior Accelerator Programme entrant
- CO = College Accelerator Programme entrant
- NG = Next Gen Accelerator Program entrant
- w/o = Walkover
- r = Retired
- d = Defaulted

=== Finals ===
Semifinals
(Sweden) Björn Borg	7	6	6
(New Zealand) Onny Parun	6	4	4
(Italy) Adriano Panatta	7	4	6	6
(Italy) Paolo Bertolucci	6	6	1	2

Final
(Sweden) Björn Borg	6	6	6	6
(Italy) Adriano Panatta	3	0	7	3

=== Top half ===
First Round
(Sweden) Björn Borg	6	6
(United States) Fred McNair	3	1
(Sweden) Birger Andersson	3	4
(Argentina) Julián Ganzábal	6	6
(Italy) Corrado Barazzutti	6	6
(West Germany) Hans-Joachim Plötz	3	4
(Chile) Jaime Pinto Bravo	3	3
(Poland) Tadeusz Nowicki	6	6
(New Zealand) Onny Parun	6	6
(Sweden) Per Jemsby	2	3
(Sweden) Kjell Johansson	2	6	2
(Italy) Martin Mulligan	6	3	6
(Italy) Tonino Zugarelli	6	6
(Sweden) Terje Larsen	3	4
(Sweden) Ove Bengtson	3	2
(Austria) Hans Kary	6	6

Second Round
(Sweden) Björn Borg	6	6
(Argentina) Julián Ganzábal	3	3
(Italy) Corrado Barazzutti	6	6
(Poland) Tadeusz Nowicki	1	0
(New Zealand) Onny Parun	6	6
(Italy) Martin Mulligan	4	2
(Italy) Tonino Zugarelli	6	6
(Austria) Hans Kary	4	2

Quarterfinals
(Sweden) Björn Borg	6	3	6
(Italy) Corrado Barazzutti	4	6	2
(New Zealand) Onny Parun	6	7
(Italy) Tonino Zugarelli	4	5

Semifinals
(Sweden) Björn Borg	7	6	6
(New Zealand) Onny Parun	6	4	4

=== Bottom half ===
First Round
(Japan) Jun Kamiwazumi	2	6	1
(Sweden) Leif Johansson	6	4	6
(Sweden) Göran Berglund	2	1
(Colombia) Iván Molina	6	6
(United States) Steve Krulevitz	6	6
(Sweden) Rolf Norberg	2	4
(Chile) Belus Prajoux	3	2
(Italy) Adriano Panatta	6	6
(Poland) Wojciech Fibak	3	3
(Sweden) Douglas Palm	6	6
(Sweden) Jan-Erik Lundqvist	6	6
(Socialist Federal Republic of Yugoslavia) Željko Franulović	2	0
(Colombia) Jairo Velasco Sr.	6	5	6
(Sweden) Tenny Svensson	3	7	4
(Bolivia) Ramiro Benavides	6	4	6
(Italy) Paolo Bertolucci	3	6	8

Second Round
(Sweden) Leif Johansson	6	4	6
(Colombia) Iván Molina	3	6	4
(United States) Steve Krulevitz	4	4
(Italy) Adriano Panatta	6	6
(Sweden) Douglas Palm	2	2
(Sweden) Jan-Erik Lundqvist	6	6
(Colombia) Jairo Velasco Sr.	0	2
(Italy) Paolo Bertolucci	6	6

Quarterfinals
(Sweden) Leif Johansson	2	2
(Italy) Adriano Panatta	6	6
(Sweden) Jan-Erik Lundqvist	6	6	5
(Italy) Paolo Bertolucci	1	7	7

Semifinals
(Italy) Adriano Panatta	7	4	6
(Italy) Paolo Bertolucci	6	6	1
