= 1975 Stockholm Open – Men's singles =

Men's singles
- 1975 Stockholm Open

Final
- Champion: (Italy) Adriano Panatta
- Runner-up: (United States) Jimmy Connors
- Score: 4-6, 6-3, 7-5

Details
- Draw: 64
- Seeds: 16

Events
Singles	men	women
Doubles	men	women
← 1974 ·	Stockholm Open	· 1976 →

Arthur Ashe was the defending champion, but lost in the quarterfinals this year.

Adriano Panatta won the title, defeating Jimmy Connors 3-6, 6-4, 7-5 in the final.

== Seeds ==
1. (United States) Arthur Ashe (quarterfinals)
2. (United States) Jimmy Connors (final)
3. (Argentina) Guillermo Vilas (first round)
4. (Sweden) Björn Borg (semifinals)
5. (Romania) Ilie Năstase (quarterfinals)
6. (Czechoslovakia) Jan Kodeš (first round)
7. (United States) Roscoe Tanner (quarterfinals)
8. (Italy) Adriano Panatta (champion)
9. (United States) Eddie Dibbs (second round)
10. (Netherlands) Tom Okker (third round)
11. (New Zealand) Onny Parun (semifinals)
12. (United States) Dick Stockton (second round)
13. (United States) Vitas Gerulaitis (second round)
14. (West Germany) Karl Meiler (third round)
15. (South Africa) Bob Hewitt (third round)
16. (United States) Jeff Borowiak (first round)

== Draw ==
=== Key ===
- Q = Qualifier
- WC = Wild card
- LL = Lucky loser
- Alt = Alternate
- ITF = ITF entry
- PR = Protected ranking
- SR = Special ranking
- SE = Special exempt
- JE = Junior exempt
- JR = Junior Accelerator Programme entrant
- CO = College Accelerator Programme entrant
- NG = Next Gen Accelerator Program entrant
- w/o = Walkover
- r = Retired
- d = Defaulted

=== Finals ===
Semifinals
8	(Italy) Adriano Panatta	6	6
11	(New Zealand) Onny Parun	3	3
4	(Sweden) Björn Borg	2	6
2	(United States) Jimmy Connors	6	7

Final
8	(Italy) Adriano Panatta	6	6
2	(United States) Jimmy Connors	4	3

=== Top half ===
==== Section 1 ====
First round
1	(United States) A Ashe	6	6
(Egypt) I El Shafei	4	3
(United States) T Waltke	6	3	6
(United States) S Segura	4	6	0
9	(United States) E Dibbs	6	6
Q	(Sweden) Bengt Lundstedt	3	2
(South Africa) R Moore	7	7
(Sweden) O Bengtson	6	6
8	(Italy) A Panatta	6	6
(Pakistan) H Rahim	3	4
(United States) S Stewart	6	6
(United States) R Kreiss	2	3
14	(West Germany) K Meiler	4	6	7
(Sweden) R Norberg	6	4	6
(Rhodesia) C Dowdeswell	6	7
Q	(United States) M Machette	1	6

Second round
1	(United States) A Ashe	6	6
(United States) T Waltke	2	4
9	(United States) E Dibbs	5	6	2
(South Africa) R Moore	7	4	6
8	(Italy) A Panatta	6	7
(United States) S Stewart	2	5
14	(West Germany) K Meiler	6	6
(Rhodesia) C Dowdeswell	4	3

Third round
1	(United States) A Ashe	6	6
(South Africa) R Moore	4	4
8	(Italy) A Panatta	7	6	7
14	(West Germany) K Meiler	6	7	6

Quarterfinals
1	(United States) A Ashe	3	2
8	(Italy) A Panatta	6	6

==== Section 2 ====
First round
3	(Argentina) G Vilas	2	2
(United Kingdom) G Stilwell	6	6
(United States) F McNair	7	6
(Sweden) T Svensson	6	3
11	(New Zealand) O Parun	6	6
Q	(Sweden) Hans Goransson	3	2
(South Africa) F McMillan	7	5	0
Q	(Venezuela) J Andrew	5	7	6
7	(United States) R Tanner	7	6
Q	(Finland) P Säilä	6	3
(Sweden) K Johansson	3	6	3
(United States) M Estep	6	4	6
15	(South Africa) B Hewitt	7	6
(United Kingdom) J Feaver	5	3
(United Kingdom) J Lloyd	7	6
(United States) V Amaya	6	4

Second round
(United Kingdom) G Stilwell	7	6
(United States) F McNair	5	2
11	(New Zealand) O Parun	6	6
Q	(Venezuela) J Andrew	3	4
7	(United States) R Tanner	6	6
(United States) M Estep	1	4
15	(South Africa) B Hewitt	6	6
(United Kingdom) J Lloyd	4	2

Third round
(United Kingdom) G Stilwell	7	4	3
11	(New Zealand) O Parun	5	6	6
7	(United States) R Tanner	7	3	7
15	(South Africa) B Hewitt	6	6	5

Quarterfinals
11	(New Zealand) O Parun	3	7	7
7	(United States) R Tanner	6	6	6

=== Bottom half ===
==== Section 3 ====
First round
(Australia) B Phillips-Moore	5	3
(Paraguay) V Pecci	7	6
(United Kingdom) B Mottram	3	4
12	(United States) D Stockton	6	6
Q	(Sweden) Björn Wahlström	3	6	4
(Sweden) B Andersson	6	2	6
(Colombia) I Molina	3	5
5	(Romania) I Năstase	6	7
(United States) E van Dillen	7	6
(Socialist Federal Republic of Yugoslavia) Ž Franulović	5	3
Q	(Sweden) J Källqvist	2	4
13	(United States) V Gerulaitis	6	6
(United Kingdom) R Taylor	7	6
(Spain) A Muñoz	6	4
(India) S Menon	4	2
4	(Sweden) B Borg	6	6

Second round
(Paraguay) V Pecci	6	6
12	(United States) D Stockton	2	4
(Sweden) B Andersson	2	2
5	(Romania) I Năstase	6	6
(United States) E van Dillen	6	6
13	(United States) V Gerulaitis	4	4
(United Kingdom) R Taylor	0	4
4	(Sweden) B Borg	6	6

Third round
(Paraguay) V Pecci	2	6
5	(Romania) I Năstase	6	7
(United States) E van Dillen	4	4
4	(Sweden) B Borg	6	6

Quarterfinals
5	(Romania) I Năstase	4	4
4	(Sweden) B Borg	6	6

==== Section 4 ====
First round
(Czechoslovakia) J Hřebec	6	6
(United States) J Austin	2	0
Q	(United States) J McManus	7	6	7
16	(United States) J Borowiak	6	7	5
(Sweden) D Palm	6	6
(Austria) H Kary	3	1
(South Africa) B Mitton	6	6
6	(Czechoslovakia) J Kodeš	3	3
(United States) C Pasarell	6	6	4
(Czechoslovakia) F Pála	3	7	6
(United States) G Hardie	2	5
10	(Netherlands) T Okker	6	7
(West Germany) U Pinner	7	6
(United States) S Krulevitz	6	3
(Poland) W Fibak	1	3
2	(United States) J Connors	6	6

Second round
(Czechoslovakia) J Hřebec	6	3	6
Q	(United States) J McManus	3	6	2
(Sweden) D Palm	2	2
(South Africa) B Mitton	6	6
(Czechoslovakia) F Pála	3	3
10	(Netherlands) T Okker	6	6
(West Germany) U Pinner	3	2
2	(United States) J Connors	6	6

Third round
(Czechoslovakia) J Hřebec	1	4
(South Africa) B Mitton	6	6
10	(Netherlands) T Okker	4	2
2	(United States) J Connors	6	6

Quarterfinals
(South Africa) B Mitton	3	1
2	(United States) J Connors	6	6
