= 1973 Swedish Open – Singles =

Singles
- 1973 Swedish Open

Final
- Champion: (United States) Stan Smith
- Runner-up: (Spain) Manuel Orantes
- Score: 6–4, 6–2, 7–6

Details
- Draw: 32

Events
Singles	Doubles
- Swedish Open

The 1973 Swedish Open – Singles event was part of the 1973 Swedish Open tennis tournament and was played on outdoor clay courts in Båstad, Sweden between 8 July and 15 July 1973. Manuel Orantes was the defending Swedish Open champion. Stan Smith won the title by defeating Orantes 6–4, 6–2, 7–6 in the final.

== Draw ==
Key

- Q = Qualifier
- WC = Wild card
- LL = Lucky loser
- Alt = Alternate
- ITF = ITF entry
- PR = Protected ranking
- SR = Special ranking
- SE = Special exempt
- JE = Junior exempt
- JR = Junior Accelerator Programme entrant
- CO = College Accelerator Programme entrant
- NG = Next Gen Accelerator Program entrant
- w/o = Walkover
- r = Retired
- d = Defaulted

=== Finals ===
Semifinals
(United States) Stan Smith	6	6	6
(Sweden) Björn Borg	4	4	2
(Sweden) Leif Johansson	3	0	0
(Spain) Manuel Orantes	6	6	6

Final
(United States) Stan Smith	6	6	7
(Spain) Manuel Orantes	4	2	6

=== Top half ===
First Round
(United States) Stan Smith	6	6
(Mexico) Joaquín Loyo-Mayo	3	2
(Argentina) Julián Ganzábal	6	6	3
(Australia) Geoff Masters	3	7	6
(Pakistan) Haroon Rahim	3	4
(Italy) Martin Mulligan	6	6
(Italy) Corrado Barazzutti	4	0
(France) Georges Goven	6	6
(Sweden) Björn Borg	6	6
(India) Anand Amritraj	1	4
(Czechoslovakia) Jan Kukal	1	6	6
(Australia) Ian Fletcher	6	4	2
(Mexico) Raúl Ramírez	6	4	5
(Chile) Jaime Pinto Bravo	4	6	7
(United Kingdom) Buster Mottram	6	3	6
(Chile) Patricio Cornejo	4	6	1

Second Round
(United States) Stan Smith	1	7	6
(Australia) Geoff Masters	6	6	2
(Italy) Martin Mulligan	6	6
(France) Georges Goven	1	1
(Sweden) Björn Borg	6	7	6
(Czechoslovakia) Jan Kukal	7	6	3
(Chile) Jaime Pinto Bravo	5	6	6
(United Kingdom) Buster Mottram	7	3	4

Quarterfinals
(United States) Stan Smith	1	6	6
(Italy) Martin Mulligan	6	2	3
(Sweden) Björn Borg	6	6
(Chile) Jaime Pinto Bravo	3	1

Semifinals
(United States) Stan Smith	6	6	6
(Sweden) Björn Borg	4	4	2

=== Bottom half ===
First Round
(Colombia) Iván Molina	6	6
(Sweden) Ove Bengtson	2	4
(Sweden) Leif Johansson	6	6
(Argentina) Guillermo Vilas	1	4
(United Kingdom) Gerald Battrick	6	4	4
(Australia) Bob Carmichael	3	6	6
(United States) Jim McManus	4	2
(Croatia) Nikola Pilić	6	6
(Australia) Ross Case	0	5
(Italy) Tonino Zugarelli	6	7
(South Africa) Frew McMillan	6	7
(India) Vijay Amritraj	3	5
(Austria) Hans Kary	6	6
(United States) Jeff Borowiak	4	4
(Sweden) Per Jemsby	5	3
(Spain) Manuel Orantes	7	6

Second Round
(Colombia) Iván Molina	2	1
(Sweden) Leif Johansson	6	6
(Australia) Bob Carmichael	4	6	1
(Croatia) Nikola Pilić	6	3	0^{r}
(Italy) Tonino Zugarelli	6	6
(South Africa) Frew McMillan	2	4
(Austria) Hans Kary	0	3
(Spain) Manuel Orantes	6	6

Quarterfinals
(Sweden) Leif Johansson	6	6
(Australia) Bob Carmichael	4	4
(Italy) Tonino Zugarelli	3	1
(Spain) Manuel Orantes	6	6

Semifinals
(Sweden) Leif Johansson	3	0	0
(Spain) Manuel Orantes	6	6	6
