= 1974 Swedish Open =

- Date: 8–14 July
- Edition: 27th
- Category: Grand Prix (Group B)
- Draw: 32S / 16D
- Prize money: $50,000
- Surface: Clay / outdoor
- Location: Båstad, Sweden

Champions

Singles
- (Sweden) Björn Borg

Doubles
- (Italy) Paolo Bertolucci / (Italy) Adriano Panatta
← 1973 ·	Swedish Open	· 1975 →

The 1974 Swedish Open was a men's tennis tournament played on outdoor clay courts held in Båstad, Sweden. It was classified as a Group B category tournament and was part of the 1974 Grand Prix circuit. It was the 27th edition of the tournament and was held from 8 July until 14 July 1974. Björn Borg won the singles title.

== Finals ==
=== Singles ===
(Sweden) Björn Borg defeated (Italy) Adriano Panatta 6–3, 6–0, 6–7, 6–3

- It was Borg's 6th singles title of the year and of his career.

=== Doubles ===
(Italy) Paolo Bertolucci / (Italy) Adriano Panatta defeated (Sweden) Ove Nils Bengtson / (Sweden) Björn Borg 3–6, 6–2, 6–4
