= 1972 Stockholm Open =

- Date: 4–10 November
- Edition: 4th
- Category: Grand Prix
- Draw: 58S / 26D
- Prize money: $63,000
- Location: Stockholm, Sweden
- Venue: Kungliga tennishallen

Champions

Singles
- (United States) Stan Smith

Doubles
- (Netherlands) Tom Okker / (United States) Marty Riessen
← 1971 ·	Stockholm Open	· 1973 →

The 1972 Stockholm Open was a men's tennis tournament played on hard courts and part of the 1972 Commercial Union Assurance Grand Prix and took place at the Kungliga tennishallen in Stockholm, Sweden. It was the fourth edition of the tournament and was held from 4 November through 10 November 1972. First-seeded Stan Smith won the singles title.

== Finals ==
=== Singles ===
(United States) Stan Smith defeated (Netherlands) Tom Okker, 6–4, 6–3

=== Doubles ===
(Netherlands) Tom Okker / (United States) Marty Riessen defeated (Australia) Roy Emerson / (Australia) Colin Dibley, 7–5, 7–6

== See also ==
- 1972 Swedish Pro Tennis Championships
- 1972 Swedish Open
