= 1974 Stockholm Open =

- Date: 26 October – 11 November
- Edition: 6th
- Category: Grand Prix (AA)
- Draw: 64D / 32S
- Prize money: $100,000
- Surface: Hard / indoor
- Location: Stockholm, Sweden
- Venue: Kungliga tennishallen
- Attendance: 26,000

Champions

Singles
- (United States) Arthur Ashe

Doubles
- (Netherlands) Tom Okker / (United States) Marty Riessen
← 1973 ·	Stockholm Open	· 1975 →

The 1974 Stockholm Open was a men's tennis tournament played on indoor hard courts which was part of the AA category of the 1974 Commercial Union Assurance Grand Prix and took place at the Kungliga tennishallen in Stockholm, Sweden. It was the sixth edition of the tournament and was held from 26 October through 11 November 1974. Fourth-seeded Arthur Ashe won the singles title, his second at the event after 1971, and earned $12,000 first-prize money.

== Finals ==
=== Singles ===
(United States) Arthur Ashe defeated (Netherlands) Tom Okker, 6–2, 6–2

=== Doubles ===
(Netherlands) Tom Okker / (United States) Marty Riessen defeated (South Africa) Bob Hewitt / (South Africa) Frew McMillan, 2–6, 6–3, 6–4
