= 1973 Swedish Open =

- Date: 8–15 July
- Edition: 26th
- Category: Grand Prix (Group B)
- Draw: 32S / 22D
- Prize money: $50,000
- Surface: Clay / outdoor
- Location: Båstad, Sweden

Champions

Singles
- (United States) Stan Smith

Doubles
- (Socialist Federal Republic of Yugoslavia) Nikola Pilić / (United States) Stan Smith
- Swedish Open

The 1973 Swedish Open, also known as the Swedish International Tennis Championships, was a men's tennis tournament played on outdoor clay courts held in Båstad, Sweden. It was classified as a Group B category tournament and was part of the 1973 Grand Prix circuit. It was the 26th edition of the tournament and was held from 8 July through 15 July 1973. First-seeded Stan Smith won the singles title and earned $8,400 first-prize money. It was the third tournament he won in Sweden within an eight month period, after the Stockholm Open on hard court in November 1972 and the Swedish Pro on carpet court in April 1973.

== Finals ==
=== Singles ===
(United States) Stan Smith defeated (Spain) Manuel Orantes 6–4, 6–2, 7–6

- It was Smith' 8th singles title of the year and the 53rd of his career.

=== Doubles ===
(Socialist Federal Republic of Yugoslavia) Nikola Pilić / (United States) Stan Smith defeated (Australia) Bob Carmichael / (South Africa) Frew McMillan 2–6, 6–4, 6–4
