= ATP Algiers Open =

ATP Algiers Open Open d'Alger ATP

Defunct tennis tournament
- Tour: ILTF World Circuit
- Founded: 1927; 98 years ago
- Abolished: 1975; 50 years ago
- Location: Algiers, Algeria
- Venue: Hôtel Saint-George LTC
- Surface: Clay

The ATP Algiers Open was a men's clay court tennis tournament founded in 1927 as the City of Algiers Championships. It was played at the Hôtel Saint-George LTC, in Algiers, Algeria.

Following World War II it was renamed the Algiers International Championships. It was played in Algiers, Algeria until 1968, then was discontinued.

In 1975 it was revived as an ATP sanctioned satellite event on the ILTF African Circuit for one season only.

== Finals ==
=== Mens singles ===
(incomplete roll)

Year	Winners	Runners-up	Score
1927	(France) Christian Boussus	(France) Emmanuel du Plaix	6–4, 2–6, 6–4, 6–1
1930	(France) Christian Boussus	(France) Jacques Brugnon	7–5, 6–1, 6–4
1936	(France) Christian Boussus	(France) Jean Lesueur	5-7, 7–5, 6–4, 4–6, 6–2
1937	(France) Christian Boussus	(France) André Merlin	6–3, 6–2, 6–2
1941	(France) Robert Abdesselam	(France) Andre Poulalion	6–4, 6–2
1942	(France) Bernard Destremau	(France) Robert Abdesselam	6–4, 3–6, 6–2, 6–2
1949	(United States) Frank Parker	(Spain) Pedro Masip	4–6, 4–6, 6–3, 6–2, 6–1
1951	(United States) Dick Savitt	(United States) Budge Patty	7–5, 6–2, 4–6, 6–4
1952	(Egypt) Jaroslav Drobný	(Poland) Władysław Skonecki	6–3, 6–3, 6–3
1953	(Belgium) Philippe Washer	(France) Robert Abdesselam	6–1, 7–5, 0–6, 6–3
1954	(United States) Budge Patty	(France) Paul Rémy	3–6, 6–4, 6–4, 7–5
1956	(France) Paul Rémy	(France) Pierre Darmon	6–3, 7–9, 6–3, 7–5
1957	(Egypt) Jaroslav Drobný	(Hungary) Antal Jancsó	6–4, 6–4
1966	(Romania) Ion Țiriac	(Algeria) Abdeslam Mahmoudi	6–4, 3–6, 6–3, 8–6
1967	(France) Michel Leclercq	(France) Jean-Claude Barclay	8-10, 6–2, 6–4
1968	(Hungary) István Gulyás	(Australia) Ken Fletcher	7–5, 6–4, 6–2
1975	(Sweden) Birger Anderson	(Socialist Federal Republic of Yugoslavia) Nikola Špear	5-7, 2–6, 6–0, 6–1, 6–2

== Sources ==
- ATP Tour: Algiers 1975. Overview. https://www.atptour.com/en/tournaments/algiers/9207/overview
- Tennis Archives: Tournament/Algiers https://www.tennisarchives.com/tournament/
