= 1975 Stockholm Open =

- Date: 3–9 November (M); 31 October – 3 November (W)
- Edition: 7th
- Surface: Carpet / indoor
- Location: Stockholm, Sweden
- Venue: Kungliga tennishallen

Champions

Men's singles
- (Italy) Adriano Panatta

Women's singles
- (United Kingdom) Virginia Wade

Men's doubles
- (South Africa) Bob Hewitt / (South Africa) Frew McMillan

Women's doubles
- (France) Françoise Dürr / (Netherlands) Betty Stöve
- Stockholm Open

The 1975 Stockholm Open was a combined men's and women's tennis tournament played on carpet courts (Vinyl Sports Floor). The men's event was part of the 1975 Commercial Union Assurance Grand Prix, while the women's took part in the 1975 Virginia Slims WTA Tour and took place at the Kungliga tennishallen in Stockholm, Sweden. The men's tournament was held from 3 through 9 November 1975 while the women's event took place from 31 October through 3 November. Adriano Panatta and Virginia Wade won the singles titles.

== Finals ==
=== Men's singles ===
(Italy) Adriano Panatta defeated (United States) Jimmy Connors 4-6, 6-3, 7-5

=== Women's singles ===
(United Kingdom) Virginia Wade defeated (France) Françoise Dürr 6–3, 4–6, 7–5

=== Men's doubles ===
(South Africa) Bob Hewitt / (South Africa) Frew McMillan defeated (United States) Charlie Pasarell / (United States) Roscoe Tanner 3–6, 6–3, 6–4

=== Women's doubles ===
(France) Françoise Dürr / (Netherlands) Betty Stöve defeated (Australia) Evonne Goolagong Cawley / (United Kingdom) Virginia Wade 6–3, 6–4
