= 1973 Stockholm Open =

- Date: 5–11 November
- Edition: 5th
- Category: Grand Prix (Group A)
- Draw: 48S / 24D
- Prize money: $77,000
- Surface: Hard / indoor
- Location: Stockholm, Sweden
- Venue: Kungliga tennishallen

Champions

Singles
- (United States) Tom Gorman

Doubles
- (United States) Jimmy Connors / (Romania) Ilie Năstase
- Stockholm Open

The 1973 Stockholm Open was a tennis tournament played on hard courts and part of the 1973 Commercial Union Assurance Grand Prix and took place at the Kungliga tennishallen in Stockholm, Sweden. The tournament was held from 5 November through 11 November 1973. Total prize money for the event was $75,000, with the winner receiving $10,000, and a record 24,000 spectators attended the tournament.

== Finals ==
=== Singles ===
(United States) Tom Gorman defeated (Sweden) Björn Borg, 6–3, 4–6, 7–6^{(7–5)}

=== Doubles ===
(United States) Jimmy Connors / (Romania) Ilie Năstase defeated (Australia) Bob Carmichael / (South Africa) Frew McMillan 6–3, 6–7, 6–2
