= Olle Palmer =

Swedish tennis player

- Country (sports): Sweden
- Residence: Bromma, Sweden
- Born: 4 October 1955 (age 69)
- Turned pro: 1973
- Plays: Right-handed

Singles
- Career record: 3–6
- Career titles: 0
- Highest ranking: No. 140 (26 Nov 1973)

Doubles
- Career record: 1–10
- Career titles: 0
- Highest ranking: No. 732 (30 Jul 1984)

Grand Slam doubles results
- Australian Open: 1R (1976)

Olle Palmer (born 4 October 1955) is a former Swedish tennis player.

== Career ==
As a Junior, Palmer participated in the Boys' Singles event at the 1973 Wimbledon Championships and lost in the second round.

Palmer made his debut in the main draw of a Grand Prix tournament at the 1973 Stockholm Open, beating his compatriot Terje Larsen in the first round and losing in the second round to the tournament second seed, Ilie Năstase.

Palmer did not play in the singles main draw of a Grand Slam tournament, but at the 1976 Australian Open he played with his compatriot, Ulf Eriksson in the doubles and lost in the first round. Palmer has a career high ATP singles ranking of 140 that he achieved on 26 November 1973.
