= 1975 Davis Cup =

1975 edition of the Davis Cup

Details
- Duration: 23 August 1974 – 21 December 1975
- Edition: 64th
- Teams: 53

Champion
- Winning nation: Sweden

The 1975 Davis Cup was the 64th edition of the Davis Cup, the most important tournament between national teams in men's tennis. 55 teams would enter the competition, 32 in the Europe Zone, 12 in the Americas Zone, and 11 in the Eastern Zone. Kenya made its first appearance in the tournament.

Chile defeated South Africa in the Americas Inter-Zonal final, Australia defeated New Zealand in the Eastern Zone final, and Sweden and Czechoslovakia were the winners of the two Europe Zones, defeating Spain and France respectively.

In the Inter-Zonal Zone, Czechoslovakia defeated Australia and Sweden defeated Chile in the semifinals. Sweden then defeated Czechoslovakia in the final to win their first title and become the sixth nation to win the Davis Cup. The final was held at the Kungliga tennishallen in Stockholm, Sweden on 19–21 December.

== Americas Zone ==
=== North & Central America Zone ===
==== Preliminary rounds ====
First Round
Nassau, Bahamas (clay)
Caribbean/West Indies	0
United States	5
Quebec City, Canada (indoor carpet)
Canada	1
Mexico	4

Qualifying Round
Palm Springs, CA, United States (hard)
United States	2
Mexico	3

==== Main Draw ====
Semifinals
Colombia
bye
South Africa	w/o
Mexico

Final
Colombia
South Africa	w/o

=== South America Zone ===
==== Preliminary rounds ====
First Round
Uruguay	w/o
Ecuador
Argentina
bye
bye
Brazil
bye
Bolivia

Qualifying Round
Montevideo, Uruguay
Uruguay	0
Argentina	5
São Paulo, Brazil
Brazil	4
Bolivia	0

==== Main Draw ====
Semifinals; 20–22 December 1974
Chile
bye
São Paulo, Brazil (clay)
Brazil	3
Argentina	2

Final; 10–12 January
Santiago, Chile
Chile	4
Brazil	1

=== Americas Inter-Zonal Final ===
Chile vs. South Africa

Chile
5
Santiago, Chile
18–20 July 1975

South Africa
0

			1	2	3	4	5
1	(Chile) (South Africa)	Patricio Cornejo; Bernard Mitton	4; 6	6; 4	6; 2	7; 5
2	(Chile) (South Africa)	Jaime Fillol; Ray Moore	6; 3	6; 3	0; 6	3; 6	6; 3
3	(Chile) (South Africa)	Patricio Cornejo / Jaime Fillol; Frew McMillan / Ray Moore	7; 5	6; 2	6; 4
4	(Chile) (South Africa)	Jaime Fillol; Bernard Mitton	2; 6	6; 2	3; 6	6; 1	7; 5
5	(Chile) (South Africa)	Patricio Cornejo; Ray Moore	6; 3	6; 4	4; 6	6; 3

== Eastern Zone ==
Pre-qualifying round
Kuala Lumpur, Malaysia
Malaysia	0
South Vietnam	5
Manila, Philippines
Philippines	3
Pakistan	2

Preliminary round
Saigon, South Vietnam
South Vietnam	3
South Korea	2
Jakarta, Indonesia
Indonesia	0
Japan	5
Colombo, Sri Lanka (clay)
Sri Lanka	1
Philippines	3

Quarterfinals
Auckland, New Zealand (grass)
New Zealand	5
South Vietnam	0
Tokyo, Japan
Japan	5
Philippines	0

Semifinals
Lucknow, India
India	1
New Zealand	3
Adelaide, Australia (grass)
Japan	1
Australia	4

Final
Auckland, New Zealand (grass)
New Zealand	0
Australia	4

=== Final ===
New Zealand vs. Australia

New Zealand
0
Stanley Street, Auckland, New Zealand
28 February–2 March 1975
Grass

Australia
4

			1	2	3	4	5
1	(New Zealand) (Australia)	Brian Fairlie; John Newcombe	5; 7	3; 6	5; 7
2	(New Zealand) (Australia)	Onny Parun; Ken Rosewall	2; 6	4; 6	2; 6
3	(New Zealand) (Australia)	Brian Fairlie / Onny Parun; Geoff Masters / John Newcombe	4; 6	4; 6	5; 7
4	(New Zealand) (Australia)	Brian Fairlie; Ken Rosewall	1; 6	11; 9	5; 7	7; 9
5	(New Zealand) (Australia)	Onny Parun; Geoff Masters	6; 3	10; 8				not completed

== Europe Zone ==
=== Zone A ===
==== Pre-qualifying round ====
Pre-qualifying round 23–25 August 1974
Tehran, Iran
Iran	5
Lebanon	0
Tel Aviv, Israel (hard)
Israel	5
Luxembourg	0

==== Preliminary rounds ====
First Round
Spain
bye
Copenhagen, Denmark (indoor carpet)
Denmark	4
Greece	1
Austria
bye
London, United Kingdom (indoor carpet)
Great Britain	5
Iran	0
Poznań, Poland (clay)
Poland	5
Portugal	0
bye
Sweden
Tel Aviv, Israel (hard)
Israel	0
Switzerland	5
bye
West Germany

Qualifying Round
Murcia, Spain (clay)
Spain	5
Denmark	0
Vienna, Austria (clay)
Austria	0
Great Britain	4
Warsaw, Poland (clay)
Poland	1
Sweden	4
Freiburg, West Germany
Switzerland	0
West Germany	5

==== Main Draw ====
Quarterfinals; 9–18 May
Romania
bye
Barcelona, Spain (clay)
Spain	3
Great Britain	2
West Berlin (clay)
West Germany	2
Sweden	3
bye
Soviet Union

Semifinals; 18–20 July
Barcelona, Spain (clay)
Romania	2
Spain	3
Jūrmala, Soviet Union (clay)
Sweden	3
Soviet Union	2

Final; 25–27 July
Barcelona, Spain (clay)
Spain	2
Sweden	3

==== Final ====
Spain vs. Sweden

Spain
2
Real Club de Tenis Barcelona, Barcelona, Spain
25–27 July 1975
Clay

Sweden
3

			1	2	3	4	5
1	(Spain) (Sweden)	Manuel Orantes; Birger Andersson	6; 1	6; 3	6; 4
2	(Spain) (Sweden)	José Higueras; Björn Borg	3; 6	1; 6	1; 6
3	(Spain) (Sweden)	Juan Gisbert / Manuel Orantes; Ove Bengtson / Björn Borg	6; 4	6; 3	6; 1
4	(Spain) (Sweden)	Manuel Orantes; Björn Borg	4; 6	2; 6	2; 6
5	(Spain) (Sweden)	José Higueras; Birger Andersson	6; 3	4; 6	3; 6	0; 6

=== Zone B ===
==== Pre-qualifying round ====
Pre-qualifying round 23 August–14 September 1974
Lagos, Nigeria (hard)
Nigeria	5
Kenya	0
Istanbul, Turkey
Turkey	3
Ireland	2

==== Preliminary rounds ====
First Round
Netherlands
bye
Helsinki, Finland
Finland	1
Hungary	4
Egypt
bye
Monte Carlo, Monaco
Monaco	4
Nigeria	1
Brussels, Belgium (indoor hard)
Belgium	5
Norway	0
bye
France
Sofia, Bulgaria
Bulgaria	5
Turkey	0
bye
Yugoslavia

Qualifying Round
Budapest, Hungary
Netherlands	0
Hungary	5
Monte Carlo, Monaco
Egypt	3
Monaco	1
Paris, France (clay)
Belgium	1
France	4
Zagreb, Yugoslavia
Bulgaria	1
Yugoslavia	4

==== Main Draw ====
Quarterfinals; 16–25 May
Czechoslovakia
bye
Cairo, Egypt
Egypt	2
Hungary	3
Paris, France (clay)
France	3
Yugoslavia	0
bye
Italy

Semifinals; 20–22 June; 18–20 July
Prague, Czechoslovakia (clay)
Czechoslovakia	4
Hungary	1
Paris, France (clay)
France	3
Italy	2

Final; 25–27 July
Prague, Czechoslovakia (clay)
Czechoslovakia	3
France	2

==== Final ====
Czechoslovakia vs. France

Czechoslovakia
3
Prague, Czechoslovakia
25–27 July 1975
Clay

France
2

			1	2	3	4	5
1	(Czechoslovakia) (France)	Jan Kodeš; Patrice Dominguez	6; 1	6; 4	1; 6	6; 0
2	(Czechoslovakia) (France)	Jiří Hřebec; François Jauffret	6; 4	4; 6	6; 3	2; 6	6; 0
3	(Czechoslovakia) (France)	Jiří Hřebec / Jan Kodeš; Patrice Dominguez / Patrick Proisy	3; 6	6; 3	4; 6	6; 1	3; 6
4	(Czechoslovakia) (France)	Jiří Hřebec; Patrice Dominguez	6; 4	3; 6	4; 6	4; 6
5	(Czechoslovakia) (France)	Jan Kodeš; François Jauffret	6; 1	7; 5	6; 1

== Inter-Zonal Zone ==
=== Draw ===
Semifinals; 19–28 September
Prague, Czechoslovakia (clay)
EUR-B	Czechoslovakia	3
EAS	Australia	1
Båstad, Sweden (clay)
AME	Chile	1
EUR-A	Sweden	4

Final; 19–21 December
Stockholm, Sweden (indoor carpet)
EUR-B	Czechoslovakia	2
EUR-A	Sweden	3

=== Semifinals ===
Sweden vs. Chile

Sweden
4
Båstad Tennis Stadium, Båstad, Sweden
19–21 September 1975
Clay

Chile
1

			1	2	3	4	5
1	(Sweden) (Chile)	Björn Borg; Patricio Cornejo	3; 6	6; 4	7; 5	6; 3
2	(Sweden) (Chile)	Birger Andersson; Jaime Fillol	3; 6	2; 6	3; 6
3	(Sweden) (Chile)	Ove Bengtson / Björn Borg; Patricio Cornejo / Jaime Fillol	7; 5	6; 2	3; 6	6; 3
4	(Sweden) (Chile)	Birger Andersson; Patricio Cornejo	6; 3	14; 12	6; 1
5	(Sweden) (Chile)	Björn Borg; Jaime Fillol	6; 1	6; 2	6; 1

Czechoslovakia vs. Australia

Czechoslovakia
3
Štvanice Stadium, Prague, Czechoslovakia
26–28 September 1975
Clay

Australia
1

			1	2	3	4	5
1	(Czechoslovakia) (Australia)	Jan Kodeš; John Alexander	6; 4	2; 6	7; 5	6; 4
2	(Czechoslovakia) (Australia)	Jiří Hřebec; Tony Roche	3; 6	4; 6	6; 1	6; 3	6; 3
3	(Czechoslovakia) (Australia)	František Pála / Vladimír Zedník; John Alexander / Phil Dent	3; 6	6; 3	2; 6	3; 6
4	(Czechoslovakia) (Australia)	Jan Kodeš; Tony Roche	6; 3	6; 1	6; 4
5	(Czechoslovakia) (Australia)	Jiří Hřebec; John Alexander	6; 8	3; 6	6; 1	6; 6		not completed

=== Final ===
Sweden vs. Czechoslovakia

Sweden
3
Kungliga tennishallen, Stockholm, Sweden
19–21 December 1975
Carpet (indoors)

Czechoslovakia
2

			1	2	3	4	5
1	(Sweden) (Czechoslovakia)	Björn Borg; Jiří Hřebec	6; 1	6; 3	6; 0
2	(Sweden) (Czechoslovakia)	Ove Bengtson; Jan Kodeš	6; 4	2; 6	5; 7	4; 6
3	(Sweden) (Czechoslovakia)	Ove Bengtson / Björn Borg; Jan Kodeš / Vladimír Zedník	6; 4	6; 4	6; 4
4	(Sweden) (Czechoslovakia)	Björn Borg; Jan Kodeš	6; 4	6; 2	6; 2
5	(Sweden) (Czechoslovakia)	Ove Bengtson; Jiří Hřebec	6; 2	3; 6	1; 6	4; 6

== Controversy ==
The Inter-Zonal Zone semifinal between Sweden and Chile was played on 19–21 September in Båstad, Sweden, two years after Augusto Pinochet's military coup in Chile. Many people in Sweden wanted the match to be cancelled, in protest of the junta's violations of human rights, however others wanted sport and politics to remain separated.

Chilekommittén mobilised protests against the match. The call for the manifestation was issued on July 30, 1975. The slogan of the protests was Stoppa matchen! ('Stop the match'). About 7,000 people took part in the protest. Hundreds of balloons, with names of political prisoners were released in the vicinity of the match venue, guarded by a police force of 1,300. Through Chilean sports commentators on site, news about the protests reached Chile. A special issue of Chilebulletinen was produced for the protests, with 20,000 copies.

The then governing Swedish Social Democratic Party didn't take part in the protests on September 20. A protest march was instead organized in Båstad by the Swedish Social Democratic Youth League on September 18, ending at the town square, where former prime minister Tage Erlander and Sweden's former ambassador to Chile Harald Edelstam (who personally helped rescue over 1,200 political prisoners in Chile after the 1973 coup) addressed a crowd of some 3,000.

Olof Palme's government tried to stop the match, but on September 12 negotiations ended with a decision to play. During the game on September 20, which was guarded by 1,300 police, over 7,000 demonstrators gathered peacefully on the square. The match was played behind closed doors with no spectators present.

== See also ==
- 1975 Nations Cup
