= Bengt Åberg (tennis) =

Swedish tennis player (born 1945)

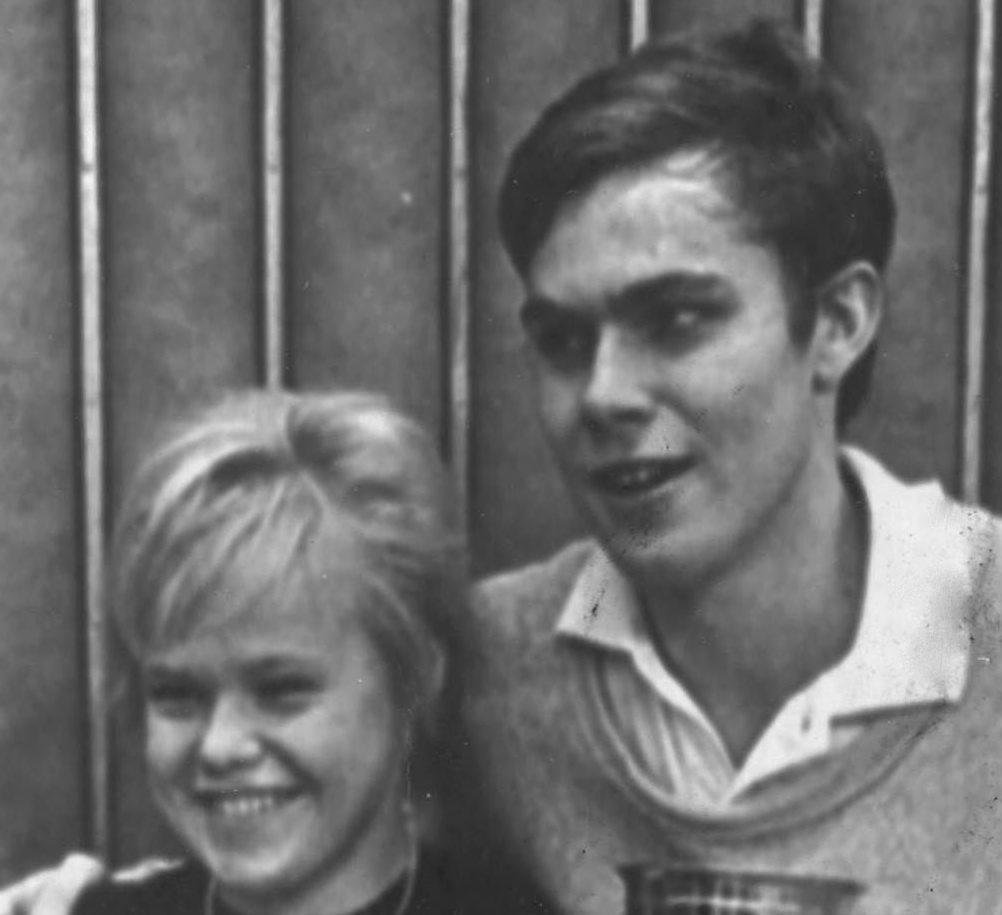
- Bengt Åberg with Birgitta Lindström in 1965
- Country (sports): Sweden
- Born: 16 December 1945 (age 80)
- Plays: Right-handed

Singles
- Career record: 0–3
- Highest ranking: No. 274 (20 December 1974)

Doubles
- Career record: 1–3

Bengt Åberg (born 16 December 1945) is a Swedish former tennis player.

During 1970, Åberg competed at the Scandinavian Indoor Championships in Oslo and lost in the final to Jan-Erik Lundqvist. He made his debut on the Grand Prix tennis circuit at the 1971 Swedish Open held at Båstad and lost in the first round to Manuel Santana.

During the 1980s Åberg acted as the physician of the Swedish Davis Cup team.
