= Colin Dibley =

Australian former tennis player (born 1944)

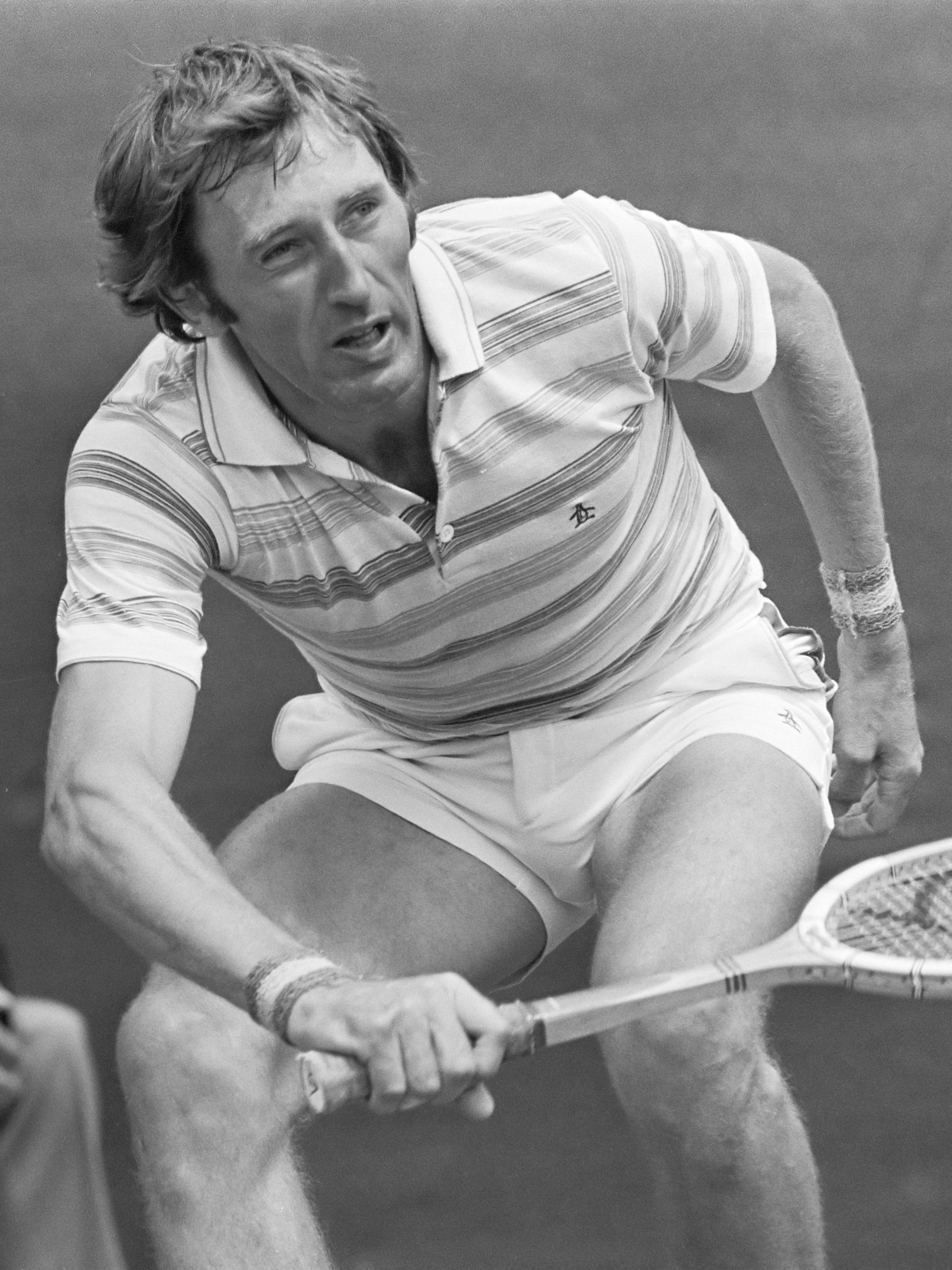
- Colin Dibley (1977)
- Country (sports): Australia
- Residence: West Orange, New Jersey, U.S.
- Born: 19 September 1944 (age 82) Sydney, Australia
- Height: 1.88 m (6 ft 2 in)
- Turned pro: 1970
- Retired: 1981
- Plays: Right-handed (one-handed backhand)

Singles
- Career record: 291–287
- Career titles: 4
- Highest ranking: No. 26 (4 June 1973)

Grand Slam singles results
- Australian Open: SF (1979)
- French Open: 3R (1971, 1973, 1975, 1978)
- Wimbledon: QF (1971, 1972)
- US Open: 3R (1971)

Doubles
- Career record: 339–247
- Career titles: 17

Grand Slam doubles results
- Australian Open: SF (1977^{Dec})
- French Open: QF (1977)
- Wimbledon: QF (1975)
- US Open: 3R (1971, 1977)

Grand Slam mixed doubles results
- Wimbledon: QF (1972)

Colin Dibley (born 19 September 1944) is a former tennis player from Australia.

Dibley once held the title for the fastest serve in the world at 148 m.p.h. During his professional career, he also won four singles and seventeen doubles titles. The right-hander reached his career-high singles ranking of world No. 26 in June 1973. After retiring in 1981, he took up real estate, still keeping himself in the game through coaching others.

== Career finals ==
=== Singles: 7 (4 titles / 3 runner-ups) ===
Result	W–L	Date	Tournament	Surface	Opponent	Score
Win	1–0	Jun 1971	Manchester, UK	Grass	(South Africa) Bob Hewitt	6–1, 6–4
Win	2–0	Jul 1972	Kitzbühel, Austria	Clay	(Australia) Dick Crealy	6–1, 6–3, 6–4
Loss	2–1	Sep 1972	Sacramento, US	Hard	(United States) Stan Smith	4–6, 7–5, 4–6, 4–6
Win	3–1	Jan 1973	La Costa WCT, US	Hard	(United States) Stan Smith	6–3, 7–6^{(8–6)}
Win	4–1	Aug 1973	South Orange, US	Grass	(India) Vijay Amritraj	6–4, 6–7, 6–4
Loss	4–2	Mar 1976	Little Rock, US	Carpet (i)	(Pakistan) Haroon Rahim	4–6, 5–7
Loss	4–3	Sep 1977	Laguna Niguel, US	Hard	(Rhodesia) Andrew Pattison	6–2, 6–7, 4–6

=== Doubles: 32 (17 titles / 15 runner-ups) ===
Result	W–L	Date	Tournament	Surface	Partner	Opponents	Score
Loss	0–1	Nov 1972	Stockholm, Sweden	Hard (i)	(Australia) Roy Emerson	(Netherlands) Tom Okker (United States) Marty Riessen	5–7, 6–7
Loss	0–2	Jan 1973	Miami, US	Hard	(Australia) Terry Addison	(Australia) Roy Emerson (Australia) Rod Laver	4–6, 4–6
Loss	0–3	Feb 1973	Richmond, US	Carpet	(Australia) Terry Addison	(Australia) Roy Emerson (Australia) Rod Laver	6–3, 3–6, 4–6
Loss	0–4	Apr 1973	St. Louis WCT, US	Carpet	(Australia) Terry Addison	(Sweden) Ove Nils Bengtson (United States) Jim McManus	2–6, 5–7
Loss	0–5	Aug 1973	Columbus Open, US	Hard	(United States) Charles Pasarell	(United Kingdom) Gerald Battrick (United Kingdom) Graham Stilwell	4–6, 6–7
Win	1–5	Aug 1973	Haverford, US	Grass	(Australia) Allan Stone	(United States) John Austin (United States) Fred McNair	7–6, 6–3
Loss	1–6	Oct 1973	Tokyo Outdoor, Japan	Hard	(Australia) Allan Stone	(Australia) Mal Anderson (Australia) Ken Rosewall	5–7, 5–7
Win	2–6	Nov 1973	Hong Kong	Hard	(Australia) Rod Laver	(United States) Paul Gerken (United States) Brian Gottfried	6–3, 5–7, 17–15
Win	3–6	Apr 1974	River Oaks, US	Clay	(Australia) Rod Laver	(United States) Arthur Ashe (United States) Roscoe Tanner	4–6, 7–6, 6–4
Loss	3–7	Mar 1975	Orlando WCT, US	Hard	(Australia) Ray Ruffels	(United States) Brian Gottfried (Mexico) Raúl Ramírez	4–6, 4–6
Win	4–7	Apr 1975	St. Louis WCT, US	Clay	(Australia) Ray Ruffels	(Australia) Ross Case (Australia) Geoff Masters	6–4, 6–4
Win	5–7	Jul 1975	Turkey Open	Outdoor	(Brazil) Thomaz Koch	(Rhodesia) Colin Dowdeswell (United Kingdom) John Feaver	6–2, 6–2, 6–2
Win	6–7	Mar 1976	Rancho Mirage, US	Hard	(United States) Sandy Mayer	(South Africa) Raymond Moore (United States) Erik van Dillen	6–4, 6–7, 7–6
Win	7–7	Apr 1976	Palma, Spain	Clay	(United States) John Andrews	(Australia) Mark Edmondson (Australia) John Marks	2–6, 6–3, 6–2
Loss	7–8	Apr 1976	Madrid, Spain	Clay	(United States) John Andrews	(Brazil) Carlos Kirmayr (Spain) Eduardo Mandarino	6–7, 6–4, 6–8
Win	8–8	May 1976	Florence, Italy	Clay	(Brazil) Carlos Kirmayr	(Hungary) Péter Szőke (Hungary) Balázs Taróczy	5–7, 7–5, 7–5
Win	9–8	Feb 1977	North Little Rock, US	Carpet	(Pakistan) Haroon Rahim	(South Africa) Bob Hewitt (South Africa) Frew McMillan	6–7, 6–3, 6–3
Win	10–8	Apr 1977	Denver, US.	Carpet	(Australia) Geoff Masters	(Australia) Syd Ball (Australia) Kim Warwick	6–2, 6–3
Win	11–8	Aug 1977	South Orange, US	Hard	(Poland) Wojciech Fibak	(Romania) Ion Țiriac (Argentina) Guillermo Vilas	6–1, 7–5
Loss	11–9	Nov 1977	Tokyo Outdoor, Japan	Clay	(Australia) Chris Kachel	(Australia) Geoff Masters (Australia) Kim Warwick	2–6, 6–7
Win	12–9	Feb 1978	North Little Rock, US	Carpet	(Australia) Geoff Masters	(United States) Tim Gullikson (United States) Tom Gullikson	7–6, 6–3
Loss	12–10	Apr 1978	Johannesburg, South Africa	Hard	(Australia) Geoff Masters	(South Africa) Bob Hewitt (South Africa) Frew McMillan	5–7, 6–7
Loss	12–11	Jul 1978	Newport, US.	Grass	(Australia) Bob Giltinan	(United States) Tim Gullikson (United States) Tom Gullikson	4–6, 4–6
Win	13–11	Aug 1978	Columbus Open, US	Clay	(Australia) Bob Giltinan	(Mexico) Marcello Lara (United States) Eliot Teltscher	6–2, 6–3
Loss	13–12	Mar 1979	San José, Costa Rica	Hard	(India) Anand Amritraj	(Romania) Ion Țiriac (Argentina) Guillermo Vilas	4–6, 6–2, 4–6
Loss	13–13	Apr 1979	Tulsa, US	Hard (i)	(United States) Tom Gullikson	(Paraguay) Francisco González (United States) Eliot Teltscher	7–6, 5–7, 3–6
Loss	13–14	Aug 1979	Stowe, US	Hard	(India) Anand Amritraj	(United States) Mike Cahill (United States) Steve Krulevitz	6–3, 3–6, 4–6
Loss	13–15	Oct 1979	Tel Aviv, Israel	Hard	(United States) Mike Cahill	(Romania) Ilie Năstase (Netherlands) Tom Okker	5–7, 4–6
Win	14–15	Oct 1979	Tokyo Outdoor, Japan	Clay	(United States) Pat DuPré	(Australia) Rod Frawley (Paraguay) Francisco González	3–6, 6–1, 6–1
Win	15–15	Dec 1979	Adelaide, Australia	Grass	(Australia) Chris Kachel	(Australia) John Alexander (Australia) Phil Dent	6–7, 7–6, 6–4
Win	16–15	Mar 1980	Lorraine Open, France	Carpet	(United States) Gene Mayer	(United States) Chris Delaney (Australia) Kim Warwick	7–6, 7–5
Win	17–15	Jan 1981	Adelaide, Australia	Grass	(Australia) John James	(United States) Craig Edwards (South Africa) Eddie Edwards	6–3, 6–4
