= Kungliga tennishallen =

Indoor tennis venue in Stockholm, Sweden

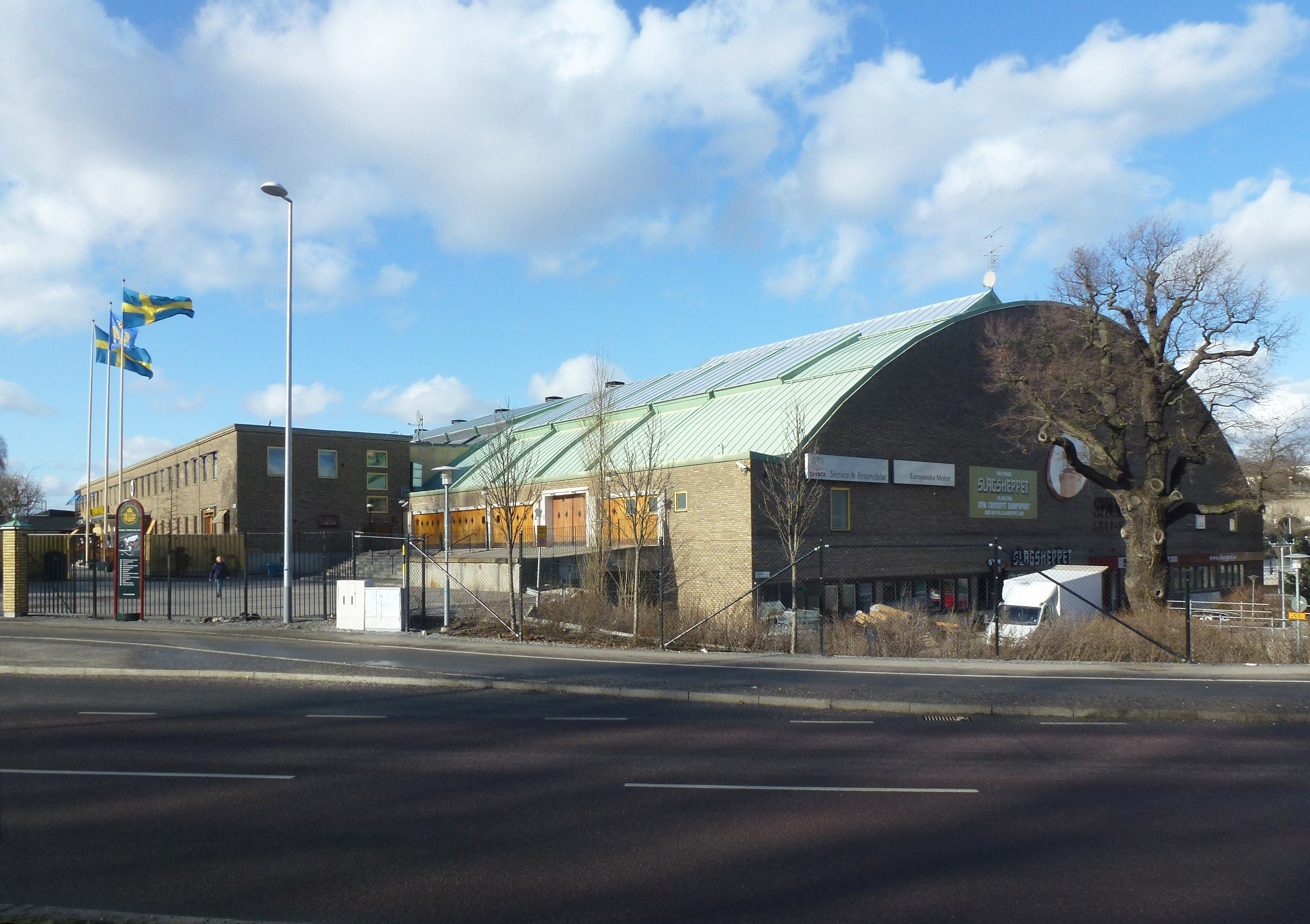
- The exterior as seen in February 2015
- Interactive map of Kungliga tennishallen
- Location: Stockholm, Sweden
- Coordinates: 59°21′01″N 18°05′43″E
- Capacity: 5,000 tennis
- Surface: Indoor hard courts (GreenSet) and outdoor clay courts

Construction
- Opened: 22 October 1943

Tenants
- Stockholm Open (Tennis) (1969–present); Davis Cup (Sweden vs Czechoslovakia) (Dec 1975); ATP Finals (November 1975); Davis Cup (Sweden vs Argentina) (March 2010)

Kungliga tennishallen (English: Royal Tennis Hall) is a tennis venue at Lidingövägen 75 in Stockholm, Sweden. The stadium was built in October 1943 and has a capacity of 5,000.

== History ==
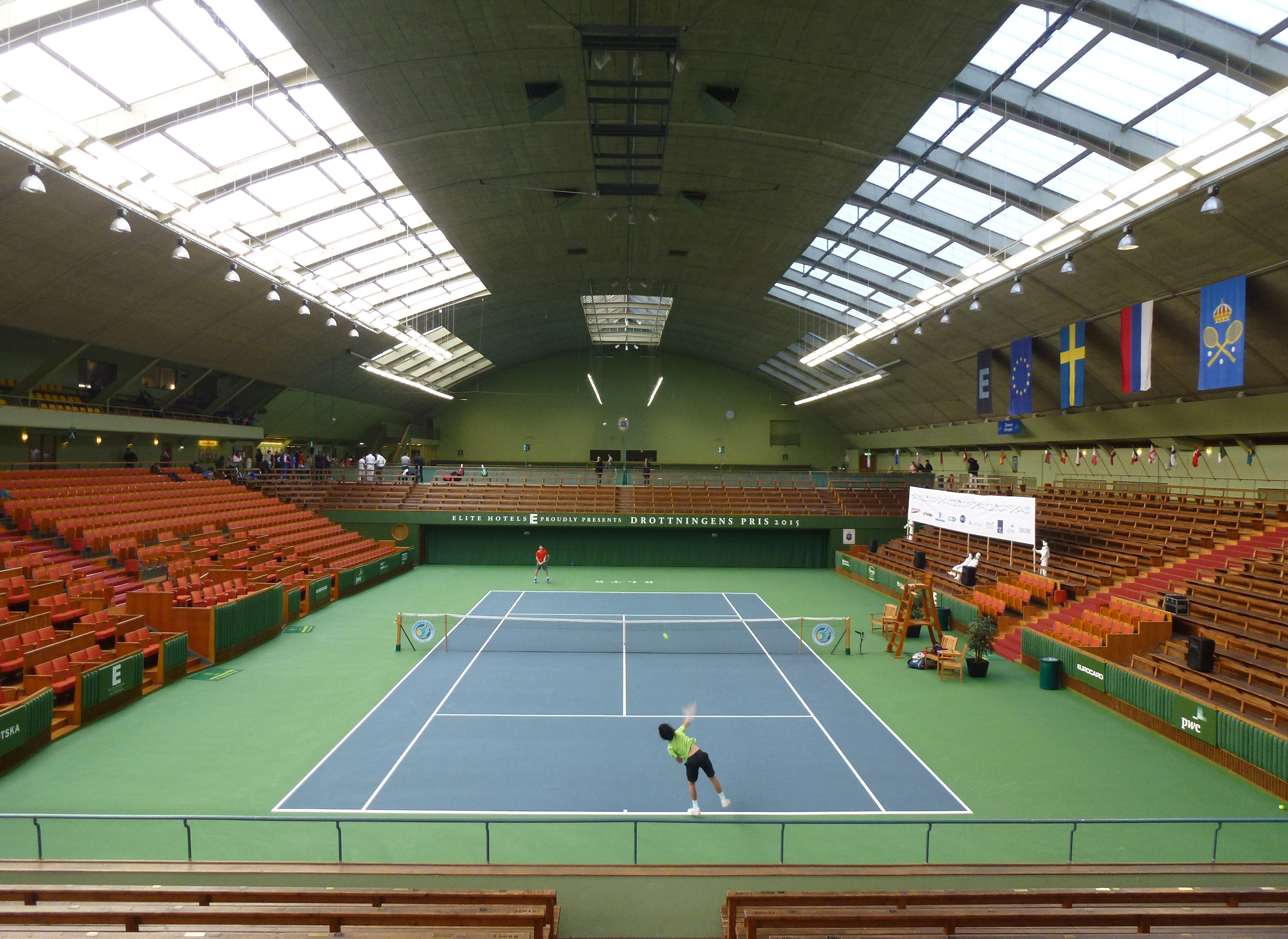
Indoor view of the main court

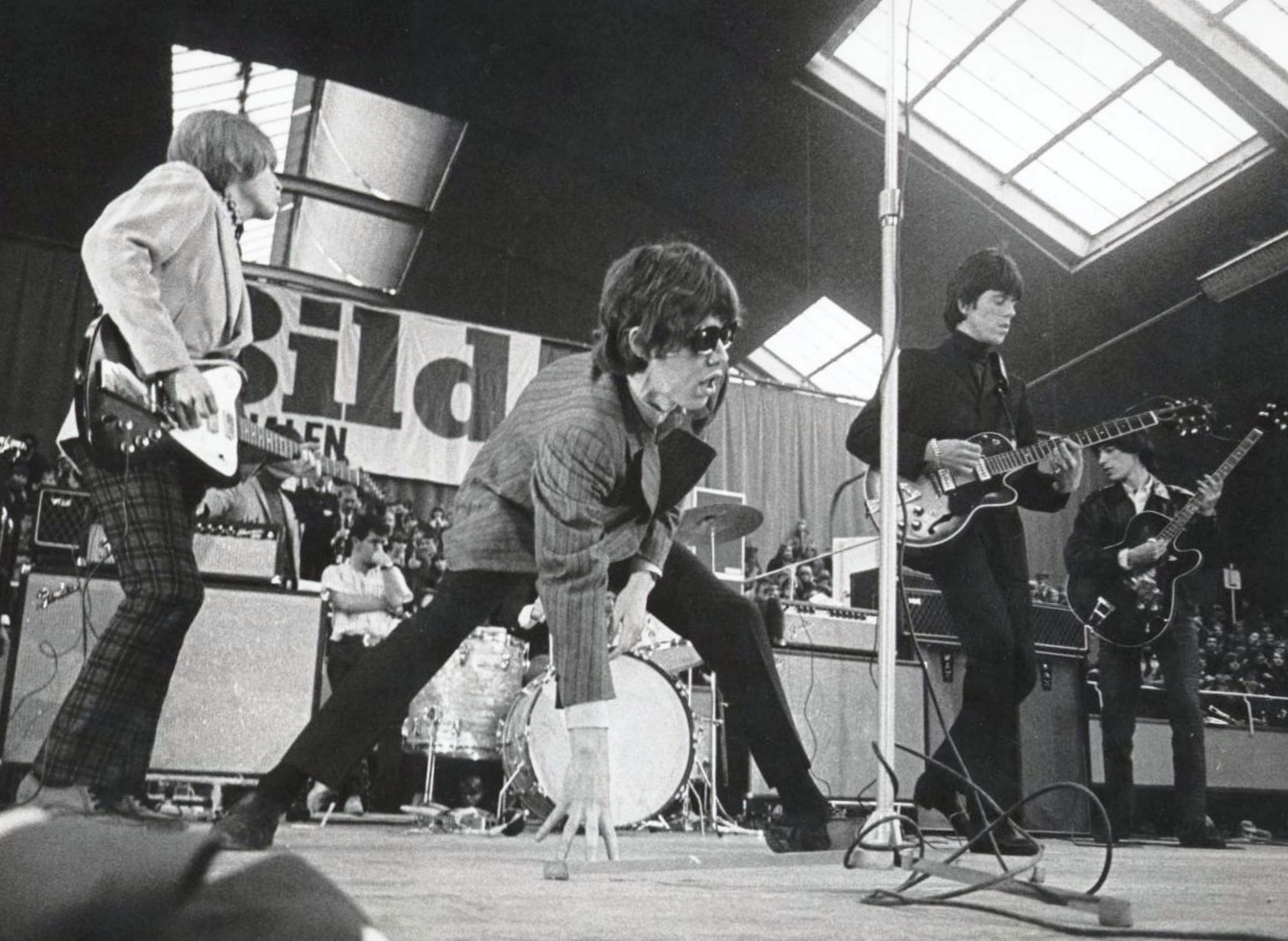
The Rolling Stones at Kungliga tennishallen in 1966

Kungliga tennishallen, now a hard-court surface, remains the venue for the men's Stockholm Open tournament which was first held in 1969. In 1975 the venue was the host of the year-end Masters tennis tournament as well as the Davis Cup final between Sweden and Czechoslovakia.

The Volvo PV444/544 was launched at the Kungliga tennishallen in September 1944.

It was the site on 15 April 1962 of the fight between former world heavyweight boxing champion Ingemar Johansson and Dutch champion Wim Snoek.

Various music concerts have been held at Kungliga including Rosita Serrano, Louis Armstrong, David Bowie, the Beatles, Led Zeppelin and the Rolling Stones.

== See also ==
- List of tennis stadiums by capacity

Preceded by Kooyong Stadium; Melbourne	Masters Cup; Venue; 1975	Succeeded by The Summit; Houston
Preceded by Public Auditorium; Cleveland	Davis Cup; Final Venue; 1975	Succeeded by Estadio Nacional; Santiago
