= Terje Larsen (tennis) =

Swedish tennis player

- Country (sports): Sweden
- Residence: Smedstorp, Sweden
- Born: 9 March 1951 (age 74)
- Plays: Left-handed

Singles
- Career record: 0–4
- Career titles: 0
- Highest ranking: No. 310 (12 Dec 1976)

Grand Slam singles results
- Wimbledon: Q1 (1974)

Doubles
- Career record: 2–8
- Career titles: 0

Mixed doubles

Grand Slam mixed doubles results
- Wimbledon: 1R (1974)

Terje Larsen (born 9 March 1951) is a former Swedish tennis player who was active in the 1970s.

== Career ==
Larsen participated in the 1968 Wimbledon boys' singles event, losing in the quarterfinals to the Italian, Adriano Panatta.

Larsen made his debut in the main draw of a Grand Prix event at the 1973 Stockholm Open, losing in the first round to his compatriot Olle Palmer. Earlier in his career, during 1971, he lost 3–6, 6–2, 6–4 to Jan Písecký in the final of the Siracusa Open, a tournament not part of the circuit.

Larsen did not play in the singles main draw of a Grand Slam tournament, but at the 1974 Wimbledon Championships he played with fellow Swede, Ingrid Löfdahl Bentzer in the mixed doubles and lost in the first round.
