= Jan Zabrodsky =

Swedish ice hockey and tennis player

- Country (sports): Sweden
- Born: 1 April 1952 (age 73) Prague, Czechoslovakia

Singles
- Career record: 2–13
- Highest ranking: No. 217 (29 July 1974)

Grand Slam singles results
- French Open: Q1 (1973)
- Wimbledon: Q2 (1975)

Doubles
- Career record: 4–16

Jan Zabrodsky (born Jan Zábrodský; 1 April 1952) is a Swedish former professional ice hockey and tennis player.

== Biography ==
Zabrodsky was born in Prague in 1952. His father, Vladimír Zábrodský, was an ice hockey player for the Czechoslovak national team, as well as a national Davis Cup representative. The family defected to Sweden in 1965.

In his early years, Zabrodsky played ice hockey, representing Skåne in the TV-pucken and Rögle BK at senior level. During his time at Rögle BK he played a season in Division 1 (1968–69). A forward, Zabrodsky signed with Djurgårdens IF for the 1970–71 season.

As a tennis player he had a best ranking of 217 in the world, with qualifying draw appearances at the French Open and Wimbledon. He had a win over Adriano Panatta at the Stockholm WCT tournament in 1975.
