= Rolf Norberg =

Swedish tennis player active in the 1970s

- Full name: Rolf Norberg
- Country (sports): Sweden
- Born: 31 January 1952 (age 74) Borgholm, Sweden
- Plays: Right-handed

Singles
- Career record: 22–46
- Career titles: 0
- Highest ranking: No. 88 (19 June 1977)

Grand Slam singles results
- French Open: 3R (1977)
- US Open: 1R (1973, 1976)

Doubles
- Career record: 21–44
- Career titles: 0

Grand Slam doubles results
- US Open: 2R (1973)

Rolf Norberg (born 31 January 1952) is a former professional tennis player from Sweden.

== Career ==
Norberg partnered Björn Borg to win the Scandinavian Indoor Championships doubles title in Helsinki in 1973 and won the singles at the Swedish Championships in 1975. On the Grand Prix circuit, one of his best wins as a singles player came in the 1976 Swedish Open when he eliminated second seed Wojtek Fibak. His only Grand Prix final was in doubles, at the Aix-en-Provence Open in 1977, with local player Patrice Dominguez. They were defeated in the final by Ilie Năstase and Ion Țiriac.

=== Grand Slam ===
He made main draw appearances at both the French Open and US Open. Most notably he reached the third round of the 1977 French Open, opening the tournament with a win over Czechoslovak qualifier Pavel Složil, then causing an upset by defeating fourth seed Eddie Dibbs.

=== Davis Cup ===
Throughout the 1970s he also played a total of six Davis Cup ties for Sweden and featured in the country's 1975 campaign when they won their first title. He played his first tie in 1973, against Spain in Båstad, called up to partner Ove Bengtson for the doubles rubber. They won that match and it was Bengtson again that Norberg partnered when he returned to the side in 1975 for Sweden's Europe Zone B quarter-final against West Germany. On this occasion Norberg and his partner lost, but Sweden went on to win the tie. He wasn't required for the rest of the tournament, which Sweden won over Czechoslovakia in the final. He next played in 1976 against Italy in Rome. With Borg making himself unavailable for selection, Norberg had the opportunity to play two singles matches, both of which he lost, in addition to the doubles rubber. His other three ties all came in the 1977 Davis Cup.

== Personal life ==
Norberg is married to arts journalist Madeleine Grive, the daughter of famed Swedish sports commentator Bengt Grive. He works as a commentator himself for Eurosport.

== Grand Prix career finals ==
=== Doubles: 1 (0–1) ===
Result	W/L	Date	Tournament	Surface	Partner	Opponents	Score
Loss	0–1	Oct 1977	Aix-en-Provence, France	Clay	(France) Patrice Dominguez	(Romania) Ilie Năstase (Romania) Ion Țiriac	6–1, 5–7, 3–6, 3–6

== See also ==
- List of Sweden Davis Cup team representatives
