= Leif Johansson (tennis) =

Swedish tennis player (born 1952)

- Country (sports): Sweden
- Born: 3 June 1952 (age 74) Södertälje, Sweden
- Turned pro: 1969
- Retired: 1976
- Plays: Right-handed (one-handed backhand)

Singles
- Career record: 13–17
- Career titles: 0
- Highest ranking: No. 51 (23 August 1973)

Grand Slam singles results
- French Open: 2R (1974)
- Wimbledon: 2R (1974)

Doubles
- Career record: 6–16
- Career titles: 0

Grand Slam doubles results
- Wimbledon: 1R (1974)

Leif Johansson (born 1952) is a former professional tennis player from Sweden.

In 1973, Johansson achieved a career-high ranking of World No. 51.

He is the father of Joachim Johansson, also a former professional tennis player.

== See also ==
- List of Sweden Davis Cup team representatives
