= Birger Andersson (tennis) =

Swedish tennis player

- Full name: Nils Birger Lennart Andersson
- Country (sports): Sweden
- Born: 26 March 1951 (age 74) Bodafors, Sweden
- Plays: Right-handed

Singles
- Career record: 39–70
- Career titles: 1
- Highest ranking: No. 73 (19 July 1975)

Grand Slam singles results
- French Open: 1R (1975, 1976, 1978)
- Wimbledon: 3R (1975)
- US Open: 1R (1975)

Doubles
- Career record: 14–56
- Career titles: 0

Grand Slam doubles results
- French Open: 1R (1975, 1978)
- Wimbledon: 1R (1975)
- US Open: 1R (1975)

Nils Birger Lennart Andersson (born 26 March 1951) is a former professional tennis player from Sweden.

== Biography ==
Andersson is best remembered for his performances for Sweden when they won the 1975 Davis Cup, the country's first title. Still a rookie, he had played professionally for only a few months before he got the Davis Cup call up. Up until the final he occupied the No. 2 singles position, behind Björn Borg. Although he didn't play in the final, he was responsible for Sweden making it that far, as he twice won the fifth and deciding match of a knockout tie. For his feats during the tournament he was given the nickname "Bragd-Birger".

In the Europe Zone quarter-final against West Germany, he defeated Karl Meiler in straight sets, to win the tie for Sweden. Soon after he made the third round of the 1975 Wimbledon Championships, with wins over Tito Vázquez and Humphrey Hose. He was again called upon for Sweden in the fifth rubber of the Europe Zone final against Spain in Barcelona and managed to beat José Higueras in four sets. For the first time in Sweden's campaign they had home advantage when they met Chile in the Inter-Zonal semi-finals in Båstad. With Sweden leading 2–1, Andersson secured his side's place in the final by beating Patricio Cornejo in the fourth rubber. Ove Bengtson was preferred over clay court specialist Andersson for the final against Czechoslovakia as the tie was played on indoor carpet. In response to being asked if he felt let down losing his spot in the team for the final he responded that he believed Swedish captain Lennart Bergelin "picked the right guy".

Andersson continued playing professional tournaments for the remainder of the decade and had his best Grand Prix performance in one of his last appearances, the semi-finals of the 1980 Swedish Open in Båstad.

Since retiring he has worked as a gymnastics director and now coaches at the Linköping tennis academy.

== Career finals ==
=== Singles: 1 (1 win) ===
Result	W-L	Date	Tournament	Surface	Opponent	Score
Win	1–0	Feb 1975	ATP Algiers Open, Algeria	Clay	(Socialist Federal Republic of Yugoslavia) Nikola Špear	5–7, 2–6, 6–0, 6–1, 6–2

== See also ==
- List of Sweden Davis Cup team representatives
