= Jeff Borowiak =

American tennis player

- Country (sports): United States
- Residence: Seattle, Washington, United States
- Born: September 25, 1949 (age 77) Berkeley, California, United States
- Height: 6 ft 4 in (1.93 m)
- Turned pro: 1968 (amateur tour from 1967)
- Retired: 1986
- Plays: Right-handed (1-handed backhand)

Singles
- Career record: 276–291
- Career titles: 5
- Highest ranking: No. 20 (August 30, 1977)

Grand Slam singles results
- Australian Open: 4R (1982)
- French Open: 3R (1978)
- Wimbledon: 4R (1971, 1981)
- US Open: 3R (1968)

Doubles
- Career record: 146–211
- Career titles: 3

Grand Slam doubles results
- French Open: 3R (1977, 1978)
- Wimbledon: 3R (1974, 1976, 1977)
- US Open: QF (1971)

Jeff Borowiak (born September 25, 1949) is a former professional tennis player from the United States, who won five singles and three doubles titles during his professional career, reaching a career-high ATP singles ranking of World No. 20 in August 1977.

== Personal ==
Borowiak is also an accomplished musician, mastering the flute and the piano. He was also indirectly involved in the formation of the group Metallica when he invested in his friend and Danish fellow player Torben Ulrich's son band Lars Rocket, which later became Metallica.

== Tennis career ==
Borowiak played number one singles on one of the greatest collegiate tennis team of all time for the UCLA Bruins. Haroon Rahim played number two singles, Jimmy Connors played at number three. Borowiak and Connors were NCAA champions, and Rahim remains the youngest player to represent his country in the Davis Cup competition.

Borowiak was ATP Comeback Player of the Year in 1981.

Borowiak was inducted into the Intercollegiate Tennis Association (ITA) Hall of Fame.

== Career finals ==
=== Singles: 11 (5 titles / 6 runners-up) ===
Result	W/L	Date	Tournament	Surface	Opponent	Score
Loss	0–1	Oct 1971	Cologne WCT, Germany	Carpet	(United States) Robert Lutz	3–6, 7–6, 3–6, 1–6
Loss	0–2	Jul 1972	Bretton Woods, US	Hard	(United States) Cliff Richey	1–6, 0–6
Loss	0–3	Apr 1974	New Orleans WCT, US	Hard	(Australia) John Newcombe	4–6, 2–6
Win	1–3	Apr 1973	Charlotte WCT, US	Clay	(United States) Dick Stockton	6–4, 5–7, 7–6^{(7–5)}
Win	2–3	Nov 1974	Oslo, Norway	Indoor	(West Germany) Karl Meiler	6–3, 6–2
Loss	2–4	Jan 1976	Atlanta WCT, US	Carpet (i)	(Romania) Ilie Năstase	2–6, 4–6
Win	3–4	Feb 1977	Dayton, US	Carpet (i)	(United Kingdom) Buster Mottram	6–3, 6–3
Win	4–4	Jul 1977	Gstaad, Switzerland	Clay	(France) Jean-François Caujolle	2–6, 6–1, 6–3
Win	5–4	Aug 1977	Toronto, Canada	Clay	(Chile) Jaime Fillol	6–0, 6–1
Loss	5–5	Mar 1981	Tampa, US	Hard	(United States) Mel Purcell	6–4, 4–6, 3–6
Loss	5–6	Nov 1981	Johannesburg, South Africa	Hard	(United States) Vitas Gerulaitis	4–6, 6–7, 1–6

=== Doubles: 9 (3 titles / 6 runners-up) ===
Result	W/L	Date	Tournament	Surface	Partner	Opponents	Score
Win	1–0	Oct 1973	Osaka, Japan		(United States) Tom Gorman	(Japan) Jun Kamiwazumi (Australia) Ken Rosewall	6–4, 7–6
Win	2–0	Feb 1974	Hempstead WCT, US	Hard	(Australia) Dick Crealy	(Australia) Ross Case (Australia) Geoff Masters	6–7, 6–4, 6–4
Win	3–0	Aug 1974	Bretton Woods, US	Clay	(Australia) Rod Laver	(France) Georges Goven (France) Francois Jauffret	6–3, 6–2
Loss	3–1	Nov 1973	Oslo, Norway	Indoor	(United States) Vitas Gerulaitis	(West Germany) Karl Meiler (Pakistan) Haroon Rahim	3–6, 2–6
Loss	3–2	Oct 1975	Maui, US	Hard	(Pakistan) Haroon Rahim	(United States) Fred McNair (United States) Sherwood Stewart	6–3, 6–7, 3–6
Loss	3–3	Mar 1976	Caracas, Venezuela	Clay	(Romania) Ilie Năstase	(United States) Brian Gottfried (Mexico) Raúl Ramírez	5–7, 4–6
Loss	3–4	Feb 1977	Dayton, US	Carpet (i)	(United States) Andrew Pattison	(United States) Hank Pfister (United States) Butch Walts	4–6, 6–7
Loss	3–5	Oct 1977	Paris, France	Hard	(United Kingdom) Roger Taylor	(United States) Brian Gottfried (Mexico) Raúl Ramírez	2–6, 0–6
Loss	3–6	Aug 1978	Indianapolis, US	Clay	(New Zealand) Chris Lewis	(United States) Gene Mayer (United States) Hank Pfister	3–6, 1–6
