= Haroon Rahim =

Pakistani tennis player

- Country (sports): Pakistan
- Born: 12 November 1949 (age 76) Lahore, Punjab, Dominion of Pakistan
- Height: 1.78 m (5 ft 10 in)
- Turned pro: 1965 (amateur); 1968
- Retired: 1978
- Plays: Right-handed

Singles
- Career record: 243–207 (54%)
- Career titles: 12
- Highest ranking: No. 34 (24 October 1977)

Grand Slam singles results
- French Open: 2R (1975)
- Wimbledon: 2R (1976, 1977)
- US Open: 3R (1971)

Doubles
- Career record: 101–127
- Career titles: 3

Grand Slam doubles results
- French Open: 2R (1972)
- Wimbledon: 3R (1976)
- US Open: QF (1971)

Haroon Rahim (born 12 November 1949) is a Pakistani former tennis player. The former Pakistani and Asian No. 1. He was active from 1965 to 1978 and won 12 singles tour titles.

Rahim was the youngest tennis player ever to play for Pakistan in the Davis Cup at 15 years of age. He was also the highest ranking Pakistani tennis player (a career-high singles ranking of World No. 34 in October 1977). He led the UCLA team to victory with Jeff Borowiak and Jimmy Connors in 1970–71 and was 1971 NCAA doubles champion with Jeff Borowiak.

== Career ==
Rahim was from the Punjab city of Lahore, from a large family of avid tennis players. His father, Mir Abdur Rahim, was a civil servant who encouraged his children, sons and daughters, to play tennis. Four of Haroon's elder siblings; M. Nasim, M. Naeem, Zulficar and Shahnaz were also national tennis champions. His father loved tennis so much that he said he wanted to die on the tennis court. In 1968, he died of a heart attack while playing doubles with friends at the picturesque Mayo Gardens, Lahore.

He played and won his first tournament in the easter of 1965 at the Huddersfield Open in England.

Rahim was only the second Pakistani after Khawaja Saeed Hai to make it to Wimbledon's main draw. After reaching the Wimbledon Junior Boys singles quarterfinals twice (1965 and 1967) he went on to play in several Grand Slams, in both singles and doubles.

He won twelve tour titles on the ILTF World Circuit including the Ojai Championships the Northumberland Championships and Cranleigh Open all in 1969.

In 1970, he won the U.S. National Amateur Grass Court Championships and the March of Dimes Open against Jimmy Connors.

In 1971, he won the Palm Springs International.

Rahim also won two ATP titles, the first at the Arkansas International in Little Rock against former Wimbledon runner up Alex Metreveli of the Soviet Union and then the second at National Tennis Foundation Open in Cleveland against Colin Dibley, both in 1976.

He lost a final to Spanish US Open winner and French Open finalist Manuel Orantes. He won three doubles titles, at Oslo in 1974, North Conway in 1975, and Little Rock in 1978. In men's doubles at Grand Slam events, he made it to the quarterfinals of the US Open, the third round of Wimbledon, and the second round of the French Open.

Rahim is the winner of one of the closest matches ever played when he beat Tom Gorman 6–7^{(3–5)}, 7–6^{(5–1)}, 7–6^{(5–4)} at the Pennsylvania Lawn Tennis Championships. As both players never lost their serve, each set went to a tie break with Haroon winning the match by just one point.

He played his last tour event at the Surrey Hard Court Championships on clay in 1978.

Last known to be in the U.S., Haroon retired from tennis at age 29, severed contact with his family, and his whereabouts are unknown.

== Grand Slams performance timelines ==
Key
| W | F | SF | QF | #R | RR | Q# | DNQ | A | NH |

(W) winner; (F) finalist; (SF) semifinalist; (QF) quarterfinalist; (#R) rounds 4, 3, 2, 1; (RR) round-robin stage; (Q#) qualification round; (DNQ) did not qualify; (A) absent; (NH) not held; (SR) strike rate (events won / competed); (W–L) win–loss record.

=== Singles ===
| Tournament | 1971 | 1972 | 1975 | 1976 | 1977 |
|---|---|---|---|---|---|
| Australian Open | A | A | A | A | A |
| French Open | A | 1R | 2R | A | A |
| Wimbledon | A | A | A | 2R | 2R |
| US Open | 3R | A | A | A | A |

=== Doubles ===
| Tournament | 1971 | 1972 | 1976 |
|---|---|---|---|
| Australian Open | A | A | A |
| French Open | A | 2R | A |
| Wimbledon | A | A | 3R |
| US Open | QF | A | A |

== ATP career finals ==
=== Singles (2 titles, 3 runners-up) ===
| Result | W–L | Date | Tournament | Surface | Opponent | Score |
|---|---|---|---|---|---|---|
| Loss | 0–1 | Mar 1972 | Altamira International Invitation | Hard | (Spain) Manuel Orantes | 4–6, 5–7, 4–6 |
| Win | 1–1 | Jan 1976 | National Tennis Foundation Open | Carpet | (Soviet Union) Alex Metreveli | 6–4, 6–4 |
| Win | 2–1 | Mar 1976 | Arkansas International Tennis Tournament | Hard (i) | (Australia) Colin Dibley | 6–4, 7–5 |
| Loss | 2–2 | Jan 1977 | Arkansas International Tennis Tournament | Hard (i) | (United States) Sandy Mayer | 2–6, 4–6 |

=== Doubles (3 titles, 3 runners-up) ===
| Result | W–L | Date | Tournament | Surface | Partner | Opponents | Score |
|---|---|---|---|---|---|---|---|
| Loss | 0–1 | Feb 1971 | New York City, United States | Carpet | (United States) Jimmy Connors | (Spain) Juan Gisbert Sr (Spain) Manuel Orantes | 6–7, 2–6 |
| Win | 1–1 | Nov 1974 | Oslo, Norway | Hard (i) | (West Germany) Karl Meiler | (United States) Jeff Borowiak (United States) Vitas Gerulaitis | 6–3, 6–2 |
| Win | 2–1 | Aug 1975 | North Conway, United States | Clay | (United States) Erik van Dillen | (Australia) John Alexander (Australia) Phil Dent | 7–6, 7–6 |
| Loss | 2–2 | Oct 1975 | Maui, United States | Hard | (United States) Jeff Borowiak | (United States) Fred McNair (United States) Sherwood Stewart | 6–3, 6–7, 3–6 |
| Loss | 2–3 | Mar 1976 | Little Rock, United States | Hard (i) | (Paraguay) Giuliano Pecci | (Australia) Syd Ball (Australia) Ray Ruffels | 3–6, 7–6, 3–6 |
| Win | 3–3 | Jan 1977 | Little Rock, United States | Hard (i) | (Australia) Colin Dibley | (South Africa) Bob Hewitt (South Africa) Frew McMillan | 6–7, 6–3, 6–3 |
