= Ove Bengtson =

Swedish tennis player

- Full name: Ove Nils Bengtson
- Country (sports): Sweden
- Born: 5 April 1945 (age 80) Danderyd Municipality, Sweden
- Height: 1.96 m (6 ft 5 in)
- Plays: Right-handed

Singles
- Career record: 137–177 (ATP)
- Career titles: 1
- Highest ranking: No. 43 (22 November 1976)

Grand Slam singles results
- French Open: 1R (1975)
- Wimbledon: 3R (1966, 1968, 1979)
- US Open: 3R (1969)

Doubles
- Career record: 111–130
- Career titles: 5

Grand Slam doubles results
- Wimbledon: 2R (1966, 1978)
- US Open: 3R (1971)

Grand Slam mixed doubles results
- Wimbledon: 3R (1969)
- US Open: 2R (1970)

Team competitions
- Davis Cup: W (1975)

Ove Nils Bengtson (born 5 April 1945) is a former professional tennis player from Sweden. He enjoyed most of his tennis success while playing doubles. During his career, he won five doubles titles. Bengtson was a member of the Swedish Davis Cup team from 1967 to 1979, posting a 7–14 record in singles and a 15–14 record in doubles. He was part of the Swedish team winning the 1975 Davis Cup, defeating Czechoslovakia in the final in Stockholm.

== Career finals ==
=== Singles: 1 (1 title) ===
Result	W–L	Date	Tournament	Surface	Opponent	Score
Win	1–0	1969	Beckenham, England	Grass	(United States) Tom Gorman	6–4, 7–5

=== Doubles (5 titles, 4 runner-ups) ===
Result	W/L	Date	Tournament	Surface	Partner	Opponents	Score
Loss	0–1	1969	London/Queen's, England	Grass	(Brazil) Thomaz Koch	(Australia) Owen Davidson (United States) Dennis Ralston	6–8, 3–6
Loss	0–2	1972	Albany, U.S.	Carpet	(Sweden) Björn Borg	(South Africa) Bob Hewitt (South Africa) Frew McMillan	2–6, 6–2, 2–6
Win	1–2	1973	St. Louis WCT, U.S.	Carpet	(United States) Jim McManus	(Australia) Terry Addison (Australia) Colin Dibley	6–2, 7–5
Win	2–2	1973	Eastbourne UK	Grass	(United States) Jim McManus	(Spain) Manuel Orantes (Romania) Ion Țiriac	6–4, 4–6, 7–5
Loss	2–3	1973	San Francisco, U.S.	Carpet	(United States) Jim McManus	(Australia) Roy Emerson (United States) Stan Smith	2–6, 1–6
Win	3–3	1974	Bologna WCT, Italy	Carpet	(Sweden) Björn Borg	(United States) Arthur Ashe (United States) Roscoe Tanner	6–4, 5–7, 4–6, 7–6, 6–2
Win	4–3	1974	London, England	Hard (i)	(Sweden) Björn Borg	(United Kingdom) Mark Farrell (United Kingdom) John Lloyd	7–6, 6–3
Loss	4–4	1974	Båstad, Sweden	Clay	(Sweden) Björn Borg	(Italy) Paolo Bertolucci (Italy) Adriano Panatta	6–3, 2–6, 4–6
Win	5–4	1975	Båstad, Sweden	Clay	(Sweden) Björn Borg	(Spain) Juan Gisbert Sr. (Spain) Manuel Orantes	7–6, 7–5
