= 1972 Swedish Open – Singles =

Singles
- 1972 Swedish Open

Final
- Champion: (Spain) Manuel Orantes
- Runner-up: (Romania) Ilie Năstase
- Score: 6–4, 6–3, 6–1

Details
- Draw: 32

Events
Singles	Doubles
← 1971 ·	Swedish Open	· 1973 →

The 1972 Swedish Open – Singles event was part of the 1972 Swedish Open tennis tournament and was played on outdoor clay courts in Båstad, Sweden between 10 July and 16 July 1973. Ilie Năstase was the defending Swedish Open champion. Manuel Orantes won the title by defeating Ilie Năstase in the final, 6–4, 6–3, 6–1.

== Draw ==
=== Key ===
- Q = Qualifier
- WC = Wild card
- LL = Lucky loser
- Alt = Alternate
- ITF = ITF entry
- PR = Protected ranking
- SR = Special ranking
- SE = Special exempt
- JE = Junior exempt
- JR = Junior Accelerator Programme entrant
- CO = College Accelerator Programme entrant
- NG = Next Gen Accelerator Program entrant
- w/o = Walkover
- r = Retired
- d = Defaulted

=== Finals ===
Semifinals
(Romania) Ilie Năstase	7	6	1
(Australia) Ray Ruffels	6	3	6
(Denmark) Jan Leschly	7	2	5
(Spain) Manuel Santana	5	6	7

Final
(Romania) Ilie Năstase	6	6	6
(Denmark) Jan Leschly	7	2	1

=== Top half ===
First Round
(Romania) Ilie Năstase	6	6	6
(Sweden) Lars Ölander	2	2	0
(Sweden) Kjell Johansson	7	4	6
(Chile) Patricio Rodríguez	5	6	0
(France) Patrick Proisy	7	1
(Australia) Dick Crealy	5	1^{r}
(Sweden) Ove Bengtson	6	7	6
(Ecuador) Eduardo Zuleta	3	5	1
(Sweden) Per Jemsby	6	6	6
(France) Georges Goven	4	4	7
(Sweden) Leif Johansson	6	0	7
(Japan) Jun Kuki	2	6	6
(Romania) Ion Țiriac	6	6	2
(Sweden) Bo Holmstrom	3	2	6
(Australia) Ray Ruffels	6	6	7
(France) François Jauffret	4	4	6

Second Round
(Romania) Ilie Năstase	7	6	6
(Sweden) Kjell Johansson	5	4	3
(France) Patrick Proisy	6	6	6
(Sweden) Ove Bengtson	4	0	4
(Sweden) Per Jemsby	6	6	6
(Sweden) Leif Johansson	4	3	3
(Romania) Ion Țiriac	5	5	3
(Australia) Ray Ruffels	7	7	6

Quarterfinals
(Romania) Ilie Năstase	6	4	6
(France) Patrick Proisy	2	6	4
(Sweden) Per Jemsby	5	4	3
(Australia) Ray Ruffels	7	6	6

Semifinals
(Romania) Ilie Năstase	7	6	1
(Australia) Ray Ruffels	6	3	6

=== Bottom half ===
First Round
(Australia) Bob Carmichael	6	6	6
(United States) Steve Siegel	3	3	3
(France) Pierre Barthès	6	6	6
(Finland) George Berner	4	4	7
(Denmark) Jan Leschly	2	6	6
(Sweden) Kenneth Andersson	6	3	0
(Socialist Federal Republic of Yugoslavia) Željko Franulović	6	6	6
(United States) Butch Seewagen	2	3	2
(Sweden) Håkan Zahr	6	6	6
(Colombia) William Álvarez	3	2	2
(Spain) Manuel Santana	7	6	7
(Sweden) Bengt Aberg	5	1	5
(Chile) Jaime Pinto Bravo	5	6	6
(Denmark) Jørgen Ulrich	7	3	0
(United States) Stan Smith	6	3	7
(Sweden) Tenny Svensson	4	6	5

Second Round
(Australia) Bob Carmichael	5	4	3
(France) Pierre Barthès	7	6	6
(Denmark) Jan Leschly	6	3	1
(Socialist Federal Republic of Yugoslavia) Željko Franulović	3	6	6
(Sweden) Håkan Zahr	2	2	6
(Spain) Manuel Santana	6	6	4
(Chile) Jaime Pinto Bravo	6	2	6
(United States) Stan Smith	4	6	7

Quarterfinals
(France) Pierre Barthès	2	2	5
(Denmark) Jan Leschly	6	6	7
(Spain) Manuel Santana	6	4	6
(United States) Stan Smith	2	6	4

Semifinals
(Denmark) Jan Leschly	7	2	5
(Spain) Manuel Santana	5	6	7
