= 1970 Stockholm Open – Doubles =

Doubles
- 1970 Stockholm Open

Final
- Champions: (United States) Arthur Ashe (United States) Stan Smith
- Runners-up: (Australia) Bob Carmichael (Australia) Owen Davidson
- Score: 6–0, 5–7, 7–5

Events
Singles	Doubles
← 1969 ·	Stockholm Open	· 1971 →

The 1970 Stockholm Open was a tennis tournament played on hard courts and part of the 1970 Pepsi-Cola Grand Prix and took place in Stockholm, Sweden. The tournament was held from November 1 through November 7, 1970. Arthur Ashe and Stan Smith won in the final by defeating Bob Carmichael and Owen Davidson, 6–0, 5–7, 7–5.

== Seeds ==
1. (Australia) Ken Rosewall / (Australia) Roy Emerson (first round)
2. (United States) Arthur Ashe / (United States) Stan Smith (champions)

== Draw ==
=== Key ===
- Q = Qualifier
- WC = Wild card
- LL = Lucky loser
- Alt = Alternate
- ITF = ITF entry
- PR = Protected ranking
- SR = Special ranking
- SE = Special exempt
- JE = Junior exempt
- JR = Junior Accelerator Programme entrant
- CO = College Accelerator Programme entrant
- NG = Next Gen Accelerator Program entrant
- w/o = Walkover
- r = Retired
- d = Defaulted

=== Main draw ===
First round
1	(Australia) R Emerson (Australia) K Rosewall	6	4	3
(Australia) B Carmichael (Australia) O Davidson	2	6	6
(Socialist Federal Republic of Yugoslavia) Z Franulović (Czechoslovakia) J Kodeš	8	6
(Australia) D Crealy (Australia) R Ruffels	6	1
(Romania) I Năstase (Romania) I Țiriac	5	0
(United States) R Barth (Sweden) P Jemsby	7	6
(Spain) A Gimeno (United Kingdom) R Taylor	6	6
(Denmark) J Leschly (Denmark) J Ulrich	4	1
(Sweden) J-E Lundqvist (United States) D Ralston	6	7
(United Kingdom) M Cox (United Kingdom) G Stilwell	4	5
(Chile) J Fillol (Sweden) L Johansson	7	7
(United States) C Graebner (United States) C Richey	5	5
(Sweden) O Bengtson (Sweden) B Holmström	2	6	3
(France) G Goven (Socialist Federal Republic of Yugoslavia) N Pilić	6	4	6
(South Africa) C Drysdale (South Africa) R Moore	3	2
2	(United States) A Ashe (United States) S Smith	6	6

Quarterfinals
(Australia) B Carmichael (Australia) O Davidson	6	4	6
(Socialist Federal Republic of Yugoslavia) Z Franulović (Czechoslovakia) J Kodeš	2	6	1
(United States) R Barth (Sweden) P Jemsby	5	4
(Spain) A Gimeno (United Kingdom) R Taylor	7	6
(Sweden) J-E Lundqvist (United States) D Ralston	6	6
(Chile) J Fillol (Sweden) L Johansson	4	4
(France) G Goven (Socialist Federal Republic of Yugoslavia) N Pilić	4	5
2	(United States) A Ashe (United States) S Smith	6	7

Semifinals
(Australia) B Carmichael (Australia) O Davidson	6	6
(Spain) A Gimeno (United Kingdom) R Taylor	3	4
(Sweden) J-E Lundqvist (United States) D Ralston
2	(United States) A Ashe (United States) S Smith	w/o

Final
(Australia) B Carmichael (Australia) O Davidson	0	7	5
2	(United States) A Ashe (United States) S Smith	6	5	7
