= 1969 Stockholm Open – Singles =

Singles
- 1969 Stockholm Open

Final
- Champion: (Socialist Federal Republic of Yugoslavia) Nikola Pilić
- Runner-up: (Romania) Ilie Năstase
- Score: 6–4, 4–6, 6–2

Details
- Draw: 32
- Seeds: 8

Events
| Singles | Doubles |
| Stockholm Open | · 1970 → |

The 1969 Stockholm Open was a tennis tournament played on indoor hard courts in Stockholm, Sweden. The tournament was held from November 1 through November 7, 1969. Unseeded Nikola Pilić defeated Ilie Năstase in the final, 6–4, 4–6, 6–2.

== Seeds ==
1. (Australia) Rod Laver (quarterfinals)
2. (Australia) Tony Roche (first round)
3. (Australia) Roy Emerson (first round)
4. (Spain) Andrés Gimeno (quarterfinals)
5. (South Africa) Cliff Drysdale (first round)
6. (United States) Marty Riessen (second round)
7. (United States) Stan Smith (semifinals)
8. (Australia) Fred Stolle (semifinals)

== Main draw ==
=== Key ===
- Q = Qualifier
- WC = Wild card
- LL = Lucky loser
- Alt = Alternate
- ITF = ITF entry
- PR = Protected ranking
- SR = Special ranking
- SE = Special exempt
- JE = Junior exempt
- JR = Junior Accelerator Programme entrant
- CO = College Accelerator Programme entrant
- NG = Next Gen Accelerator Program entrant
- w/o = Walkover
- r = Retired
- d = Defaulted

=== Finals ===
Semifinals
(Romania) Ilie Năstase | 6 | 3 | 6
(United States) Stan Smith | 4 | 6 | 3
(Socialist Federal Republic of Yugoslavia) Nikola Pilić | 7 | 12 | 6
(Australia) Fred Stolle | 9 | 10 | 2

Final
(Romania) Ilie Năstase | 4 | 6 | 2
(Socialist Federal Republic of Yugoslavia) Nikola Pilić | 6 | 4 | 6

=== Top half ===
First round
1 | (Australia) T Roche | 2 | 4
(Romania) I Năstase | 6 | 6
(Sweden) H Zahr | 6 | 6
(France) J-C Barclay | 3 | 2
(United States) M Riessen | 6 | 6
(Denmark) J Ulrich | 3 | 2
(Romania) I Țiriac | 6 | 6
(Sweden) R Norberg | 4 | 1
(Spain) A Gimeno | 6 | 6
(Sweden) K Johansson | 4 | 2
(Sweden) O Bengtson | 6 | 6
(Sweden) K Andersson | 4 | 1
(United States) S Smith | w/o
(France) P Barthès
(Czechoslovakia) F Pála | 3 | 6 | 6
(France) P Beust | 6 | 3 | 0

Second round
(Romania) I Năstase | 6 | 6
(Sweden) H Zahr | 1 | 3
(United States) M Riessen | 8 | 3 | 4
(Romania) I Țiriac | 6 | 6 | 6
(Spain) A Gimeno | 2 | 6 | 6
(Sweden) O Bengtson | 6 | 3 | 0
(United States) S Smith | 6 | 6
(Czechoslovakia) F Pála | 4 | 3

Quarterfinals
(Romania) I Năstase | 6 | 6
(Romania) I Țiriac | 1 | 3
(Spain) A Gimeno | 4 | 5
(United States) S Smith | 6 | 7

Semifinals
(Romania) I Năstase | 6 | 3 | 6
(United States) S Smith | 4 | 6 | 3

=== Bottom half ===
First round
(Socialist Federal Republic of Yugoslavia) N Pilić | 6 | 6
(United Kingdom) R Taylor | 3 | 2
(United States) B Buchholz | 7 | 6
(South Africa) C Drysdale | 5 | 2
(Sweden) B Andersson | 6 | 3 | 1
(United States) R Holmberg | 4 | 6 | 6
(United States) C Pasarell | 3 | 6 | 7
(Australia) R Emerson | 6 | 3 | 5
(Sweden) P Jemsby | 6 | 6
(Denmark) T Ulrich | 3 | 4
(Czechoslovakia) J Kukal | 3 | 3
(Australia) F Stolle | 6 | 6
(Sweden) B Folke | 5 | 6
(South Africa) R Moore | 7 | 8
(Sweden) L Johansson | 6 | 3 | 1
(Australia) R Laver | 3 | 6 | 6

Second round
(Socialist Federal Republic of Yugoslavia) N Pilić | 6 | 6
(United States) B Buchholz | 3 | 4
(United States) R Holmberg | 3 | 2
(United States) C Pasarell | 6 | 6
(Sweden) P Jemsby | 3 | 2
(Australia) F Stolle | 6 | 6
(South Africa) R Moore | 4 | 4
(Australia) R Laver | 6 | 6

Quarterfinals
(Socialist Federal Republic of Yugoslavia) N Pilić | 6 | 7
(United States) C Pasarell | 3 | 5
(Australia) F Stolle | 7 | 8 | 6
(Australia) R Laver | 5 | 10 | 4

Semifinals
(Socialist Federal Republic of Yugoslavia) N Pilić | 7 | 12 | 6
(Australia) F Stolle | 9 | 10 | 2
