= 1970 Stockholm Open – Singles =

Singles
- 1970 Stockholm Open

Final
- Champion: (United States) Stan Smith
- Runner-up: (United States) Arthur Ashe
- Score: 5–7, 6–4, 6–4

Events
Singles	Doubles
← 1969 ·	Stockholm Open	· 1971 →

The 1970 Stockholm Open was a tennis tournament played on hard courts and part of the 1970 Pepsi-Cola Grand Prix and took place in Stockholm, Sweden. The tournament was held from November 1 through November 7, 1970. Stan Smith won in the final by beating Arthur Ashe 5–7, 6–4, 6–4.

== Seeds ==
1. (Australia) Ken Rosewall (semifinal)
2. (United States) Arthur Ashe (final)

== Draw ==
=== Key ===
- Q = Qualifier
- WC = Wild card
- LL = Lucky loser
- Alt = Alternate
- ITF = ITF entry
- PR = Protected ranking
- SR = Special ranking
- SE = Special exempt
- JE = Junior exempt
- JR = Junior Accelerator Programme entrant
- CO = College Accelerator Programme entrant
- NG = Next Gen Accelerator Program entrant
- w/o = Walkover
- r = Retired
- d = Defaulted

=== Finals ===
Semifinals
1	(Australia) Ken Rosewall	10	2	7
(United States) Stan Smith	8	6	9
(United States) Cliff Richey	5	4
2	(United States) Arthur Ashe	7	6

Final
(United States) Stan Smith	5	6	6
2	(United States) Arthur Ashe	7	4	4

=== Top half ===
First round
1	(Australia) K Rosewall	6	6
(Czechoslovakia) J Kodeš	3	4
(Denmark) J Leschly	3	11	6
(Egypt) I Shafei	6	9	2
(Socialist Federal Republic of Yugoslavia) N Pilić	11	6	4
(Australia) R Ruffels	13	3	6
(Romania) I Țiriac	3	12	3
(United Kingdom) M Cox	6	10	6
(United States) S Smith	6	6
(United States) T Gorman	1	2
(South Africa) C Drysdale	6	6
(United States) C Graebner	1	4
(France) G Goven	6	2	6
(Australia) D Crealy	2	6	4
(Australia) B Carmichael	6	6
(Finland) P Saila	4	3

Second round
1	(Australia) K Rosewall	6	6
(Denmark) J Leschly	0	2
(Australia) R Ruffels	6	8	4
(United Kingdom) M Cox	3	10	6
(United States) S Smith	6	6
(South Africa) C Drysdale	3	3
(France) G Goven	6	9
(Australia) B Carmichael	4	7

Quarterfinals
1	(Australia) K Rosewall	6	6
(United Kingdom) M Cox	3	4
(United States) S Smith	6	6
(France) G Goven	2	3

Semifinals
1	(Australia) K Rosewall	10	2	7
(United States) S Smith	8	6	9

=== Bottom half ===
First round
(Chile) J Fillol	4	3
(United States) D Ralston	6	6
(Sweden) P Jemsby	2	4
(Romania) I Năstase	6	6
(Socialist Federal Republic of Yugoslavia) Z Franulović	6	7
(Australia) O Davidson	3	5
(Spain) A Gimeno	21	1
(United States) C Richey	23	6
(Sweden) L Johansson	5	4
(Sweden) B Holmström	7	6
(Sweden) O Bengtson	4	2
(Australia) R Emerson	6	6
(Sweden) K Johansson	3	9
(United Kingdom) R Taylor	6	11
(South Africa) R Moore	3	6
2	(United States) A Ashe	6	8

Second round
(United States) D Ralston	5	6	6
(Romania) I Năstase	7	3	0
(Socialist Federal Republic of Yugoslavia) Z Franulović	1	10	3
(United States) C Richey	6	8	6
(Sweden) B Holmström	1	6	4
(Australia) R Emerson	6	3	6
(United Kingdom) R Taylor	3	7	4
2	(United States) A Ashe	6	5	6

Quarterfinals
(United States) D Ralston
(United States) C Richey	w/o
(Australia) R Emerson	4	8	4
2	(United States) A Ashe	6	6	6

Semifinals
(United States) C Richey	5	4
2	(United States) A Ashe	7	6
