= 1969 Stockholm Open – Doubles =

Doubles
- 1969 Stockholm Open

Final
- Champion: (Australia) Roy Emerson (Australia) Rod Laver
- Runner-up: (Spain) Andrés Gimeno (United Kingdom) Graham Stilwell
- Score: 6–4, 6–2

Events
| Singles | Doubles |
| Stockholm Open | · 1970 → |

The 1969 Stockholm Open was a tennis tournament played on hard courts in Stockholm, Sweden. The tournament was held from November 1 through November 7, 1969. Roy Emerson and Rod Laver won in the final 6–4, 6–2 against Andrés Gimeno and Graham Stilwell.

== Draw ==
=== Key ===
- Q = Qualifier
- WC = Wild card
- LL = Lucky loser
- Alt = Alternate
- ITF = ITF entry
- PR = Protected ranking
- SR = Special ranking
- SE = Special exempt
- JE = Junior exempt
- JR = Junior Accelerator Programme entrant
- CO = College Accelerator Programme entrant
- NG = Next Gen Accelerator Program entrant
- w/o = Walkover
- r = Retired
- d = Defaulted

=== Main draw ===
First round
(Spain) A Gimeno (United Kingdom) G Stilwell | 6 | 6
(Denmark) J Ulrich (Denmark) T Ulrich | 2 | 0
(South Africa) C Drysdale (United Kingdom) R Taylor | 6 | 6
(Sweden) L Johansson (Sweden) R Norberg | 2 | 4
(Romania) I Năstase (Romania) I Țiriac | 6 | 7 | 11
(Sweden) O Bengtson (Australia) T Roche | 3 | 9 | 13
(France) N Barthes (Socialist Federal Republic of Yugoslavia) N Pilić
(France) J-C Barclay (France) P Beust | w/o
(Sweden) B Folke (Sweden) K Johansson | 2 | 6 | 6
(Sweden) B Andersson (Sweden) H Zahr | 6 | 2 | 4
(Sweden) K Andersson (Sweden) P Jemsby | 4 | 1
(United States) C Pasarell (United States) S Smith | 6 | 6
(United States) R Holmberg (United States) M Riessen | 6 | 6
(United States) B Buchholz (South Africa) R Moore | 2 | 3
(Czechoslovakia) J Kukal (Czechoslovakia) F Pála | 4 | 8
(Australia) R Emerson (Australia) R Laver | 6 | 10

Quarterfinals
(Spain) A Gimeno (United Kingdom) G Stilwell | 6 | 6
(South Africa) C Drysdale (United Kingdom) R Taylor | 3 | 3
(Sweden) O Bengtson (Australia) T Roche | 6 | 6
(France) J-C Barclay (France) P Beust | 3 | 0
(Sweden) B Folke (Sweden) K Johansson | 7 | 5
(United States) C Pasarell (United States) S Smith | 9 | 7
(United States) R Holmberg (United States) M Riessen | 3 | 5
(Australia) R Emerson (Australia) R Laver | 6 | 7

Semifinals
(Spain) A Gimeno (United Kingdom) G Stilwell | 6 | 12 | 9
(Sweden) O Bengtson (Australia) T Roche | 4 | 14 | 7
(United States) C Pasarell (United States) S Smith | 2 | 9
(Australia) R Emerson (Australia) R Laver | 6 | 11

Final
(Spain) A Gimeno (United Kingdom) G Stilwell | 4 | 2
(Australia) R Emerson (Australia) R Laver | 6 | 6
