= 1970 Grand Prix (tennis) =

Tennis circuit

1970 Grand Prix circuit
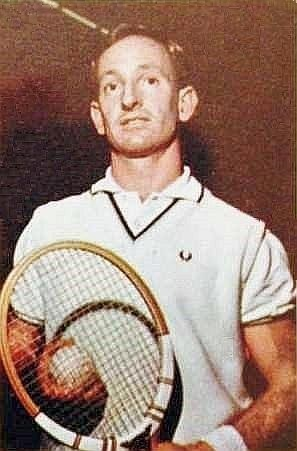
- Rod Laver in 1970

Details
- Duration: 27 April 1970 – 9 December 1970
- Edition: 1st
- Tournaments: 20
- Categories: Group A (3); Masters; Group 1 (6); Group 2 (11)

Achievements (singles)
- Most titles: (Australia) Rod Laver (4)
- Most finals: (Australia) Rod Laver (7)
- Prize money leader: (United States) Cliff Richey ($25,000)
- Points leader: (United States) Cliff Richey (60)

The 1970 Pepsi-Cola ILTF Grand Prix was a tennis circuit administered by the International Lawn Tennis Federation (ILTF) which served as a forerunner to the current Association of Tennis Professionals (ATP) World Tour and the Women's Tennis Association (WTA) Tour. It was the inaugural edition of the Grand Prix circuit and consisted of men's tournaments recognised by the ILTF. (Note: A Grand Prix circuit for women was introduced in 1971.) The creation of the Grand Prix circuit, on an experimental basis during its first year, was announced in April 1970 by the president of the ILTF, Ben Barnett. It was the brainchild of Jack Kramer, former tennis promoter and winner of the Wimbledon and US championships, and was aimed at countering the influence of commercial promoters, particularly Lamar Hunt and his World Championship Tennis circuit and George MacCall's National Tennis League.

The tournaments were graded in one of three categories which determined the number of ranking points available: Class A, comprising the three Grand Slam tournaments, Class 1 and Class 2. The Pepsi-Cola Masters and Davis Cup Final are included in this calendar but did not count towards the Grand Prix. In addition to the tournament prize money a bonus pool of $150,000 was available for the top 20 ranked players. The bonus pool was jointly funded by Pepsi-Cola as title sponsor and the participating tournaments which reserved 10% of their prize money. Cliff Richey earned $25,000 bonus as the winner of the first Grand Prix circuit. At the end of the season the top six ranked players qualified for a Masters round-robin tournament held in Tokyo which was won by Stan Smith.

All open tennis tournaments were eligible to be included in the Grand Prix circuit provided they committed to not paying any management fees to commercial organizations with players under contract. Originally the Italian Championships, played in April in Rome, was part of the Grand Prix calendar but it was withdrawn during the tournament when it became known that they had paid management fees to the competing World Championship Tennis organization.

== Schedule ==
Key

Class A tournaments
Grand Prix Masters
Group 1 tournaments
Group 2 tournaments
Team events

=== April ===
Week	Tournament	Champions	Runners-up	Semifinalists	Quarterfinalists
27 Apr	Rothmans British Hard Court Championships; Bournemouth, Great Britain; Clay – $25,000 – 32S/16D/16XD; Group 2	(United Kingdom) Mark Cox; 6–1, 6–2, 6–3	(South Africa) Bob Hewitt	(United Kingdom) Gerald Battrick (Socialist Federal Republic of Yugoslavia) Nikola Pilić	(France) Georges Goven (Egypt) Ismail El Shafei (France) François Jauffret (Netherlands) Tom Okker
27 Apr	Rothmans British Hard Court Championships; Bournemouth, Great Britain; Clay – $25,000 – 32S/16D/16XD; Group 2	(Netherlands) Tom Okker (Australia) Tony Roche; 2–6, 6–4, 6–4, 6–4	(Australia) William Bowrey (Australia) Owen Davidson	(United Kingdom) Gerald Battrick (Socialist Federal Republic of Yugoslavia) Nikola Pilić	(France) Georges Goven (Egypt) Ismail El Shafei (France) François Jauffret (Netherlands) Tom Okker
27 Apr	Rothmans British Hard Court Championships; Bournemouth, Great Britain; Clay – $25,000 – 32S/16D/16XD; Group 2	(United States) Billie Jean King (South Africa) Bob Hewitt; 6–2, 3–6, 6–1	(United Kingdom) Virginia Wade (South Africa) Bob Maud	(United Kingdom) Gerald Battrick (Socialist Federal Republic of Yugoslavia) Nikola Pilić	(France) Georges Goven (Egypt) Ismail El Shafei (France) François Jauffret (Netherlands) Tom Okker

=== May ===
Week	Tournament	Champions	Runners-up	Semifinalists	Quarterfinalists
25 May	French Open; Paris, France; Grand Slam; Group A Clay – 128S/101Q/72D/53XD; Singles – Doubles – Mixed doubles	(Czechoslovakia) Jan Kodeš; 6–2, 6–4, 6–0	(Socialist Federal Republic of Yugoslavia) Željko Franulović	(United States) Cliff Richey (France) Georges Goven	(Romania) Ilie Năstase (United States) Arthur Ashe (France) François Jauffret (Italy) Martin Mulligan
25 May	French Open; Paris, France; Grand Slam; Group A Clay – 128S/101Q/72D/53XD; Singles – Doubles – Mixed doubles	(Romania) Ilie Năstase (Romania) Ion Țiriac; 6–2, 6–4, 6–3	(United States) Arthur Ashe (United States) Charlie Pasarell	(United States) Cliff Richey (France) Georges Goven	(Romania) Ilie Năstase (United States) Arthur Ashe (France) François Jauffret (Italy) Martin Mulligan
25 May	French Open; Paris, France; Grand Slam; Group A Clay – 128S/101Q/72D/53XD; Singles – Doubles – Mixed doubles	(United States) Billie Jean King (South Africa) Bob Hewitt; 3–6, 6–4, 6–2	(France) Françoise Dürr (France) Jean-Claude Barclay	(United States) Cliff Richey (France) Georges Goven	(Romania) Ilie Năstase (United States) Arthur Ashe (France) François Jauffret (Italy) Martin Mulligan

=== June ===
Week	Tournament	Champions	Runners-up	Semifinalists	Quarterfinalists
22 Jun	Wimbledon Championships; London, Great Britain; Grand Slam; Group A Grass – 128S/80Q/64D/32Q/56XD/12Q; Singles – Doubles – Mixed doubles	(Australia) John Newcombe; 5–7, 6–3, 6–2, 3–6, 6–1	(Australia) Ken Rosewall	(United Kingdom) Roger Taylor (Spain) Andrés Gimeno	(United States) Clark Graebner (Australia) Tony Roche (Australia) Bob Carmichael (Australia) Roy Emerson
22 Jun	Wimbledon Championships; London, Great Britain; Grand Slam; Group A Grass – 128S/80Q/64D/32Q/56XD/12Q; Singles – Doubles – Mixed doubles	(Australia) John Newcombe (Australia) Tony Roche; 10–8, 6–3, 6–1	(Australia) Ken Rosewall (Australia) Fred Stolle	(United Kingdom) Roger Taylor (Spain) Andrés Gimeno	(United States) Clark Graebner (Australia) Tony Roche (Australia) Bob Carmichael (Australia) Roy Emerson
22 Jun	Wimbledon Championships; London, Great Britain; Grand Slam; Group A Grass – 128S/80Q/64D/32Q/56XD/12Q; Singles – Doubles – Mixed doubles	(United States) Rosemary Casals (Romania) Ilie Năstase; 6–3, 4–6, 9–7	(Soviet Union) Olga Morozova (Soviet Union) Alex Metreveli	(United Kingdom) Roger Taylor (Spain) Andrés Gimeno	(United States) Clark Graebner (Australia) Tony Roche (Australia) Bob Carmichael (Australia) Roy Emerson

=== July ===
Week	Tournament	Champions	Runners-up	Semifinalists	Quarterfinalists
6 Jul	Swedish Championships; Båstad, Sweden; Clay – 32S/21D; Group 1	(Australia) Dick Crealy; 6–3, 6–1, 6–1	(France) Georges Goven	(Socialist Federal Republic of Yugoslavia) Željko Franulović (Australia) Bob Carmichael	(Sweden) Per Jemsby (United States) Clark Graebner (Australia) John Alexander (Chile) Patricio Rodríguez
6 Jul	Swedish Championships; Båstad, Sweden; Clay – 32S/21D; Group 1	(Australia) Dick Crealy (Australia) Allan Stone; 6–2, 2–6, 12–12 RET.	(Socialist Federal Republic of Yugoslavia) Željko Franulović (Czechoslovakia) Jan Kodeš	(Socialist Federal Republic of Yugoslavia) Željko Franulović (Australia) Bob Carmichael	(Sweden) Per Jemsby (United States) Clark Graebner (Australia) John Alexander (Chile) Patricio Rodríguez
13 Jul	Washington Star International; Washington, United States; Clay – $35,000 – 64S/32D; Group 2	(United States) Cliff Richey; 7–5, 6–2, 6–1	(United States) Arthur Ashe	(Romania) Ilie Năstase (Romania) Ion Țiriac	(South Africa) Bob Hewitt (France) Georges Goven (Australia) Dick Crealy (United States) Stan Smith
13 Jul	Washington Star International; Washington, United States; Clay – $35,000 – 64S/32D; Group 2	(South Africa) Bob Hewitt (South Africa) Frew McMillan; 7–5, 6–0	(Romania) Ilie Năstase (Romania) Ion Țiriac	(Romania) Ilie Năstase (Romania) Ion Țiriac	(South Africa) Bob Hewitt (France) Georges Goven (Australia) Dick Crealy (United States) Stan Smith
20 Jul	Western Championships; Cincinnati, United States; Clay – $25,000 – 64S/32D; Group 2	(Australia) Ken Rosewall; 7–9, 9–7, 8–6	(United States) Cliff Richey	(Romania) Ilie Năstase (Czechoslovakia) Jan Kodeš	(United States) Clark Graebner (Romania) Ion Țiriac (United States) Stan Smith (South Africa) Bob Hewitt
20 Jul	Western Championships; Cincinnati, United States; Clay – $25,000 – 64S/32D; Group 2	(Romania) Ilie Năstase (Romania) Ion Țiriac; 6–3, 6–4	(South Africa) Bob Hewitt (South Africa) Frew McMillan	(Romania) Ilie Năstase (Czechoslovakia) Jan Kodeš	(United States) Clark Graebner (Romania) Ion Țiriac (United States) Stan Smith (South Africa) Bob Hewitt
27 Jul	U.S. Clay Court Championships; Indianapolis, United States; Clay – $50,000 – 64S/32D; Group 1	(United States) Cliff Richey; 6–2, 10–8, 3–6, 6–1	(United States) Stan Smith	(Socialist Federal Republic of Yugoslavia) Željko Franulović (United States) Arthur Ashe	(South Africa) Frew McMillan (United States) Clark Graebner (Australia) Allan Stone (Chile) Jaime Fillol
27 Jul	U.S. Clay Court Championships; Indianapolis, United States; Clay – $50,000 – 64S/32D; Group 1	(United States) Arthur Ashe (United States) Clark Graebner; 2–6, 6–4, 6–4	(Romania) Ilie Năstase (Romania) Ion Țiriac	(Socialist Federal Republic of Yugoslavia) Željko Franulović (United States) Arthur Ashe	(South Africa) Frew McMillan (United States) Clark Graebner (Australia) Allan Stone (Chile) Jaime Fillol

=== August ===
Week	Tournament	Champions	Runners-up	Semifinalists	Quarterfinalists
3 Aug	First National Bank Classic; Louisville, United States; Group 2 Clay – $25,000 – 16S/8D; Singles – Doubles	(Australia) Rod Laver; 6–3, 6–3	(Australia) John Newcombe	(Australia) Tony Roche (Australia) Ken Rosewall	(South Africa) Cliff Drysdale (Spain) Andrés Gimeno (Australia) Roy Emerson (United States) Dennis Ralston
3 Aug	First National Bank Classic; Louisville, United States; Group 2 Clay – $25,000 – 16S/8D; Singles – Doubles	(Australia) John Newcombe (Australia) Tony Roche; 8–6, 5–7, 6–4	(Australia) Roy Emerson (Australia) Rod Laver	(Australia) Tony Roche (Australia) Ken Rosewall	(South Africa) Cliff Drysdale (Spain) Andrés Gimeno (Australia) Roy Emerson (United States) Dennis Ralston
3 Aug	Bavarian Open Championships; Munich, West Germany; Group 2; 24S/8D	(Romania) Ion Țiriac; 2–6, 9–7, 6–3, 6–4	(Socialist Federal Republic of Yugoslavia) Niki Pilić	(West Germany) Christian Kunke (Romania) Ilie Năstase	(South Africa) Bob Hewitt (West Germany) Harald Elschenbroich (Australia) John Alexander (Australia) Barry Phillips-Moore
3 Aug	Bavarian Open Championships; Munich, West Germany; Group 2; 24S/8D	(Australia) Owen Davidson (Socialist Federal Republic of Yugoslavia) Niki Pilić; 6–4, 7–5, 6–4	(South Africa) Bob Hewitt (South Africa) Frew McMillan	(West Germany) Christian Kunke (Romania) Ilie Năstase	(South Africa) Bob Hewitt (West Germany) Harald Elschenbroich (Australia) John Alexander (Australia) Barry Phillips-Moore
10 Aug	U.S. Professional Tennis Championships; Boston, United States; Group 1 Hard – $50,000 – 32S/16D; Singles – Doubles	(Australia) Tony Roche; 3–6, 6–4, 1–6, 6–2, 6–2	(Australia) Rod Laver	(Australia) Roy Emerson (South Africa) Cliff Drysdale	(Chile) Jaime Fillol (United States) Arthur Ashe (Czechoslovakia) Jan Kodeš (Australia) Ray Ruffels
10 Aug	U.S. Professional Tennis Championships; Boston, United States; Group 1 Hard – $50,000 – 32S/16D; Singles – Doubles	(Australia) Roy Emerson (Australia) Rod Laver; 6–1, 7–6	(Egypt) Ismail El Shafei (Denmark) Torben Ulrich	(Australia) Roy Emerson (South Africa) Cliff Drysdale	(Chile) Jaime Fillol (United States) Arthur Ashe (Czechoslovakia) Jan Kodeš (Australia) Ray Ruffels
24 Aug	Pennsylvania Championships; Merion, United States; Group 2 Grass – 64S/32D	(Australia) Ray Ruffels; 6–3, 7–6, 6–3	(Chile) Jaime Fillol	(Australia) Dick Crealy (New Zealand) Brian Fairlie	(Australia) Bob Carmichael (Pakistan) Haroon Rahim (Australia) William Bowrey (South Africa) Cliff Drysdale
24 Aug	Pennsylvania Championships; Merion, United States; Group 2 Grass – 64S/32D	(Australia) William Bowrey (Australia) Ray Ruffels; 3–6, 6–2, 7–5	(United States) Jim McManus (United States) Jim Osborne	(Australia) Dick Crealy (New Zealand) Brian Fairlie	(Australia) Bob Carmichael (Pakistan) Haroon Rahim (Australia) William Bowrey (South Africa) Cliff Drysdale
24 Aug	Davis Cup Final; Cleveland, United States – hard (i)	United States; 5–0	West Germany		
31 Aug	Marlboro Open; South Orange, United States; Group 2 Grass – $25,000 – 42S/19D	(Australia) Rod Laver; 6–4, 6–2, 6–2	(Australia) Bob Carmichael	(Australia) Ken Rosewall (Soviet Union) Alex Metreveli	(Spain) Andrés Gimeno (New Zealand) Brian Fairlie (United States) Dick Stockton (New Zealand) Onny Parun
31 Aug	Marlboro Open; South Orange, United States; Group 2 Grass – $25,000 – 42S/19D	(Chile) Patricio Cornejo (Chile) Jaime Fillol; 3–6, 7–6, 7–6	(Spain) Andrés Gimeno (Australia) Rod Laver	(Australia) Ken Rosewall (Soviet Union) Alex Metreveli	(Spain) Andrés Gimeno (New Zealand) Brian Fairlie (United States) Dick Stockton (New Zealand) Onny Parun

=== September ===
Week	Tournament	Champions	Runners-up	Semifinalists	Quarterfinalists
7 Sep	US Open; New York, United States; Grand Slam; Class A Grass – $176,000 – 108S/63D/34XD; Singles – Doubles – Mixed doubles	(Australia) Ken Rosewall; 2–6, 6–4, 7–6^{(5–2)}, 6–3	(Australia) Tony Roche	(United States) Cliff Richey (Australia) John Newcombe	(United States) Dennis Ralston (New Zealand) Brian Fairlie (United States) Stan Smith (United States) Arthur Ashe
7 Sep	US Open; New York, United States; Grand Slam; Class A Grass – $176,000 – 108S/63D/34XD; Singles – Doubles – Mixed doubles	(France) Pierre Barthès (Socialist Federal Republic of Yugoslavia) Nikola Pilić; 6–3, 7–6, 4–6, 7–6	(Australia) Roy Emerson (Australia) Rod Laver	(United States) Cliff Richey (Australia) John Newcombe	(United States) Dennis Ralston (New Zealand) Brian Fairlie (United States) Stan Smith (United States) Arthur Ashe
7 Sep	US Open; New York, United States; Grand Slam; Class A Grass – $176,000 – 108S/63D/34XD; Singles – Doubles – Mixed doubles	(Australia) Margaret Court (United States) Marty Riessen; 6–4, 6–4	(Australia) Judy Tegart (South Africa) Frew McMillan	(United States) Cliff Richey (Australia) John Newcombe	(United States) Dennis Ralston (New Zealand) Brian Fairlie (United States) Stan Smith (United States) Arthur Ashe
21 Sep	Pepsi Pacific Southwest Open; Los Angeles, United States; Group 1 Hard – $65,000 – 64S/32D; Singles – Doubles	(Australia) Rod Laver; 4–6, 6–4, 7–6^{(7–5)}	(Australia) John Newcombe	(United States) Arthur Ashe (United States) Tom Gorman	(United States) Stan Smith (United States) Clark Graebner (United States) Marty Riessen (United States) Pancho Gonzales
21 Sep	Pepsi Pacific Southwest Open; Los Angeles, United States; Group 1 Hard – $65,000 – 64S/32D; Singles – Doubles	(Netherlands) Tom Okker (United States) Marty Riessen; 7–6, 6–2	(United States) Bob Lutz (United States) Stan Smith	(United States) Arthur Ashe (United States) Tom Gorman	(United States) Stan Smith (United States) Clark Graebner (United States) Marty Riessen (United States) Pancho Gonzales
28 Sep	Pacific Coast Championships; Berkeley, United States; Group 2 Hard – 64S/32D	(United States) Arthur Ashe; 6–4, 6–2, 6–4	(United States) Cliff Richey	(United States) Stan Smith (United States) Dennis Ralston	(Australia) Bob Carmichael (Czechoslovakia) Jan Kodeš (Chile) Jaime Fillol (Brazil) Thomaz Koch
28 Sep	Pacific Coast Championships; Berkeley, United States; Group 2 Hard – 64S/32D	(United States) Bob Lutz (United States) Stan Smith; 6–2, 7–5, 4–6, 6–2	(United States) Roy Barth (United States) Tom Gorman	(United States) Stan Smith (United States) Dennis Ralston	(Australia) Bob Carmichael (Czechoslovakia) Jan Kodeš (Chile) Jaime Fillol (Brazil) Thomaz Koch

=== October ===
Week	Tournament	Champions	Runners-up	Semifinalists	Quarterfinalists
18 Oct	Phoenix Thunderbird Open; Phoenix, United States; Hard – 31S/16D; Group 2	(United States) Stan Smith; 6–3, 6–7, 6–1	(United States) Jim Osborne	(United States) Barry MacKay (tennis) (Australia) Bob Carmichael	(United States) Charlie Pasarell (Czechoslovakia) Jan Kodeš (United States) Frank Froehling (United States) Tom Edlefsen
18 Oct	Phoenix Thunderbird Open; Phoenix, United States; Hard – 31S/16D; Group 2	(Australia) Dick Crealy (Australia) Ray Ruffels; 7–6, 6–3	(Czechoslovakia) Jan Kodeš (United States) Charlie Pasarell	(United States) Barry MacKay (tennis) (Australia) Bob Carmichael	(United States) Charlie Pasarell (Czechoslovakia) Jan Kodeš (United States) Frank Froehling (United States) Tom Edlefsen

=== November ===
Week	Tournament	Champions	Runners-up	Semifinalists	Quarterfinalists
1 Nov	Stockholm Open; Stockholm, Sweden; Group 2 Hard (i) – $35,000 – 32S/16D; Singles – Doubles	(United States) Stan Smith; 5–7, 6–4, 6–4	(United States) Arthur Ashe	(Australia) Ken Rosewall (United States) Cliff Richey	(United Kingdom) Mark Cox (France) Georges Goven (United States) Dennis Ralston (Australia) Roy Emerson
1 Nov	Stockholm Open; Stockholm, Sweden; Group 2 Hard (i) – $35,000 – 32S/16D; Singles – Doubles	(United States) Arthur Ashe (United States) Stan Smith; 6–0, 5–7, 7–5	(Australia) Bob Carmichael (Australia) Owen Davidson	(Australia) Ken Rosewall (United States) Cliff Richey	(United Kingdom) Mark Cox (France) Georges Goven (United States) Dennis Ralston (Australia) Roy Emerson
8 Nov	South American Championships; Buenos Aires, Argentina; Group 1 Clay – 32S/8D	(Socialist Federal Republic of Yugoslavia) Željko Franulović; 6–4, 6–2, 6–0	(Spain) Manuel Orantes	(Czechoslovakia) Jan Kodeš (Australia) Bob Carmichael	(Australia) Ray Ruffels (Czechoslovakia) Jan Kukal (Australia) Dick Crealy (United States) Cliff Richey
8 Nov	South American Championships; Buenos Aires, Argentina; Group 1 Clay – 32S/8D	(Australia) Bob Carmichael (Australia) Ray Ruffels; 7–5, 6–2, 5–7, 6–7, 6–3	(Socialist Federal Republic of Yugoslavia) Željko Franulović (Czechoslovakia) Jan Kodeš	(Czechoslovakia) Jan Kodeš (Australia) Bob Carmichael	(Australia) Ray Ruffels (Czechoslovakia) Jan Kukal (Australia) Dick Crealy (United States) Cliff Richey
8 Nov	Paris Open; Paris, France; Group 2 Carpet – $31,000 – 32S/8D; Singles	(United States) Arthur Ashe; 7–6, 6–4, 6–3	(United States) Marty Riessen	(United States) Stan Smith (France) Georges Goven	(United States) Pancho Gonzales (United States) Dennis Ralston (United Kingdom) Roger Taylor (Australia) Ken Rosewall
8 Nov	Paris Open; Paris, France; Group 2 Carpet – $31,000 – 32S/8D; Singles	(United States) Pancho Gonzales (Australia) Ken Rosewall; 6–4, 7–6, 7–6	(Netherlands) Tom Okker (United States) Marty Riessen	(United States) Stan Smith (France) Georges Goven	(United States) Pancho Gonzales (United States) Dennis Ralston (United Kingdom) Roger Taylor (Australia) Ken Rosewall
16 Nov	Embassy British Indoor Championships; London, England; Group 1 Carpet – 32S/16D; Singles	(Australia) Rod Laver; 6–3, 6–4, 6–4	(United States) Cliff Richey	(South Africa) Cliff Drysdale (Australia) Ken Rosewall	(Romania) Ilie Năstase (United States) Dennis Ralston (United Kingdom) Roger Taylor (United States) Pancho Gonzales
16 Nov	Embassy British Indoor Championships; London, England; Group 1 Carpet – 32S/16D; Singles	(Australia) Ken Rosewall (United States) Stan Smith; 6–4, 6–3, 6–2	(Romania) Ilie Năstase (Romania) Ion Țiriac	(South Africa) Cliff Drysdale (Australia) Ken Rosewall	(Romania) Ilie Năstase (United States) Dennis Ralston (United Kingdom) Roger Taylor (United States) Pancho Gonzales

=== December ===
Week	Tournament	Champions	Runners-up	Semifinalists	Quarterfinalists
9 Dec	Pepsi-Cola Masters; Tokyo, Japan; Hard (i) – $50,000 – 6S/3D (round robin); Singles – Doubles	(United States) Stan Smith	(Australia) Rod Laver	NA	NA
9 Dec	Pepsi-Cola Masters; Tokyo, Japan; Hard (i) – $50,000 – 6S/3D (round robin); Singles – Doubles	(United States) Arthur Ashe (United States) Stan Smith	(Czechoslovakia) Jan Kodeš (Australia) Rod Laver	NA	NA

== Grand Prix point system ==
The tournaments listed above were divided into three categories. Class A consisted of the Grand Slams while the other tournaments were divided into Class 1 and Class 2. Points were allocated based on these groups and the finishing position of a player in a tournament. Ties were settled by the number of tournaments played. The points allocation is listed below:

Class A
- Champion: 15
- Runner-up: 10
- Semifinalist: 7
- Quarterfinalist: 5
- 9th – 16th: 3
- 17th – 32nd: 2

Class 1
- Champion: 11
- Runner-up: 7
- Semifinalist: 5
- 5th – 8th: 3
- 9th – 16th: 1

Class 2
- Champion: 8
- Runner-up: 6
- Semifinalist: 4
- 5th – 8th: 2
- 9th – 16th: 1

== Grand Prix rankings ==
Position	Name	Nation	Points	Prize money (US$)
1	Cliff Richey	USA	60	25,000
2	Arthur Ashe	USA	55	17,000
3	Ken Rosewall	AUS	53	15,000
4	Rod Laver	AUS	51	12,000
5	Stan Smith	USA	47	10,500
6	Željko Franulović	YUG	35	9,500
7	John Newcombe	AUS	35	8,500
8	Jan Kodeš	CSK	33	7,500
9	Tony Roche	AUS	32	6,500
10	Bob Carmichael	AUS	31	6,000
11	Georges Goven	FRA	25	5,500
12	Ilie Năstase	ROM	25	5,000
13	Dick Crealy	AUS	24	4,500
14	Ray Ruffels	AUS	22	4,000
15	Clark Graebner	USA	22	3,500
16	Dennis Ralston	USA	22	3,000
17	Jaime Fillol	CHI	20	2,500
18	Ion Țiriac	ROM	19	2,000
19	Cliff Drysdale	RSA	19	1,500
20	Roy Emerson	AUS	19	1,000

== List of tournament winners ==
The list of winners and number of singles titles won (Grand Slams and Masters in bold text), alphabetically by last name:

- (United States) Arthur Ashe (3) **Australian Open**, Berkeley, Paris Indoor
- (United Kingdom) Mark Cox (1) Bournemouth
- (Australia) Dick Crealy (1) Båstad
- (Socialist Federal Republic of Yugoslavia) Željko Franulović (1) Buenos Aires
- (Czechoslovakia) Jan Kodeš (1) **French Open**
- (Australia) Rod Laver (4) Louisville, South Orange, Los Angeles, Wembley
- (Australia) John Newcombe (1) **Wimbledon**
- (United States) Cliff Richey (2) Washington, Indianapolis
- (Australia) Tony Roche (2) Gstaad, Boston
- (Australia) Ray Ruffels (1) Merion
- (Australia) Ken Rosewall (2) Cincinnati, **US Open**
- (Spain) Manuel Santana (1) Barcelona
- (United States) Stan Smith (3) Phoenix, Stockholm, Pepsi-Cola Masters

The list of winners and number of doubles titles won (Grand Slams and Masters in bold text), last name alphabetically:

- (United States) Arthur Ashe (3) Indianapolis, Stockholm, **Pepsi-Cola Masters**
- (France) Pierre Barthès (2) Munich, **US Open**
- (Australia) William Bowrey (1) Merion
- (Australia) Bob Carmichael (1) Buenos Aires
- (Chile) Patricio Cornejo (1) South Orange
- (Australia) Dick Crealy (2) Båstad, Phoenix
- (Australia) Owen Davidson (1) Munich
- (Australia) Roy Emerson (1) Boston
- (Chile) Jaime Fillol (1) South Orange
- (United States) Clark Graebner (1) Indianapolis
- (South Africa) Bob Hewitt (1) Washington
- (Australia) Rod Laver (1) Boston
- (United States) Bob Lutz (2) **Australian Open**, Berkeley
- (South Africa) Frew McMillan (1) Washington
- (Romania) Ilie Năstase (2) **French Open**, Cincinnati
- (Australia) John Newcombe (2) **Wimbledon**, Louisville
- (Netherlands) Tom Okker (2) Bournemouth, Los Angeles
- (Socialist Federal Republic of Yugoslavia) Nikola Pilić (1) **US Open**
- (United States) Marty Riessen (1) Los Angeles
- (Australia) Tony Roche (3) Bournemouth, **Wimbledon**, Louisville
- (Australia) Ken Rosewall (1) London
- (Australia) Ray Ruffels (3) Merion, Phoenix, Buenos Aires
- (United States) Stan Smith (5) **Australian Open**, Berkeley, London, Stockholm, **Pepsi-Cola Masters**
- (Australia) Allan Stone (1) Båstad
- (Romania) Ion Țiriac (2) **French Open**, Cincinnati

The list of winners and number of mixed doubles titles won (Grand Slams and Masters in bold text), alphabetically by last name:

- (South Africa) Bob Hewitt (2) Bournemouth, **French Open**
- (Romania) Ilie Năstase (1) **Wimbledon**
- (United States) Marty Riessen (1) **US Open**

The following players won their first singles title in 1970:

- (Australia) Dick Crealy Båstad
- (Czechoslovakia) Jan Kodeš **French Open**

== See also ==
- 1970 World Championship Tennis circuit
