= Danish International Championships =

Defunct tennis tournament
- Tour: ILTF World Circuit (Europe)
- Founded: 1902
- Abolished: 1969
- Location: Copenhagen; Denmark
- Venue: Boldklub
- Category: International
- Surface: Clay / outdoor

The Danish International Championships was an DTF/ILTF affiliated open clay court mens tennis tournament founded in 1902 as the open Danish Championships. Also known as the Copenhagen International it was usually played in June or July at the Kjøbenhavns Boldklub in Copenhagen, Denmark until 1969.

== History ==
The Danish Championships were unofficially founded at the Bold Klub in 1902 it was formally recognized by the Danish Tennis Federation (Dansk Tennis Forbund, DTF), in 1904 as open event to foreign players, not to be confused with the Danish National Championships that was an outdoor closed tournament to Danish nationals or residents, following world war two it became widely known as the Danish International Championships.

== Past finals ==
=== Mens Singles ===
(incomplete roll)

Year	Champions	Runners-up	Score
1902	(United Kingdom) Frederick Payn	(United Kingdom) Major Ritchie	3–6, 11–9, 6–3, 3–6, 6–4
1921	(Germany) Oscar Kreuzer	(Germany) Otto Froitzheim	5–7, 6–2, 6–4, 7–5
1931	(Denmark) Einer Ulrich	(Denmark) Alfred Wium	6–4, 6–4, 7–5
1933	(France) Christian Boussus	(France) Jacques Brugnon	6–2, 7–5, 6–0
1935	(Sweden) Kalle Schröder	(Italy) Augusto Rado	6–8, 1–6, 6–1, 6–0, 6–4
1936	(Norway) Johan Haanes	(Denmark) Einer Ulrich	6–2, 3–6, 6–4, 6–2
1939	(United States) Owen Anderson	(Denmark) Anker Jacobsen	6–4, 4–6, 6–3, 2–6, 6–3
1950	(Egypt) Jaroslav Drobny	(United States) Fred Kovaleski	6–2, 6–8, 6–1
1951	(United States) Budge Patty	(Czechoslovakia) Vladimir Cernik	won?
1954	(United States) Tony Trabert	(United States) Vic Seixas	6–1, 6–3, 6–3
1956	(Australia) Jack Arkinstall	(Denmark) Kurt Nielsen	2–5, 6–2, 6–1
1962	(Denmark) Jan Leschly	(Denmark) Torsten Johansson	6–3, 6–1, 1–6, 6–3
1966	(Australia) Ken Fletcher	(Australia) Martin Mulligan	6–4, 6–3
1967	(Australia) Ken Fletcher (2)	(Sweden) Jan-Erik Lundquist	3–6, 6–4, 7–5, 6–4
1969	(Australia) Martin Mulligan	(Denmark) Jan Leschly	6–4, 4–6, 9–7, 12–14, 6–1
