= 1970 Swedish Open =

- Date: 2–12 July
- Edition: 23rd
- Category: Grand Prix
- Draw: 32S/32D
- Surface: Clay / outdoor
- Location: Båstad, Sweden

Champions

Men's singles
- (Australia) Dick Crealy

Women's singles
- (United States) Peaches Bartkowicz

Men's doubles
- (Australia) Dick Crealy / (Australia) Allan Stone
← 1969 ·	Swedish Open	· 1971 →

The 1970 Swedish Open, officially known as the Swedish Open Championships, was a combined men's and women's tennis tournament played on outdoor clay courts in Båstad, Sweden. It was part of the Grand Prix circuit of the 1970 Tour. It was the 23rd edition of the tournament and was held from 2 July through 12 July 1970. Dick Crealy and Peaches Bartkowicz won the singles titles.

== Finals ==
=== Men's singles ===
(Australia) Dick Crealy defeated (France) Georges Goven 6–3, 6–1, 6–1

=== Women's singles ===
(United States) Peaches Bartkowicz defeated (Sweden) Ingrid Bentzer 6–1, 6–1

=== Doubles ===
(Australia) Dick Crealy / (Australia) Allan Stone defeated (Socialist Federal Republic of Yugoslavia) Željko Franulović / (Czechoslovakia) Jan Kodeš 6–2, 2–6, 12–12, RET.
