= Ingrid Löfdahl Bentzer =

Swedish tennis player

Ingrid Bentzer
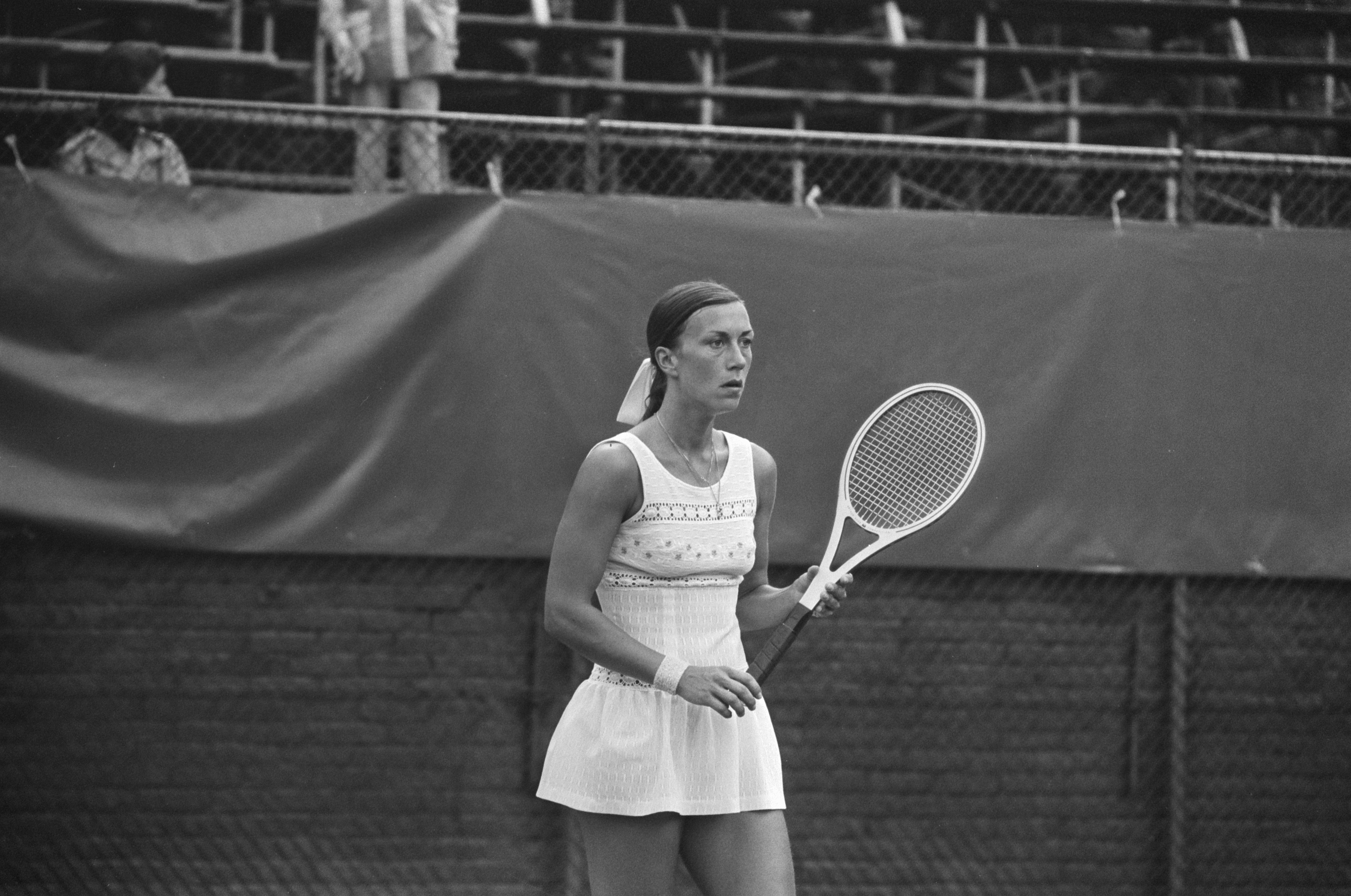
- Ingrid Bentzer (1974)
- Full name: Ingrid Löfdahl Bentzer
- Country (sports): Sweden
- Born: 6 December 1943 (age 82) Malmö, Sweden
- Height: 5 ft 8 in (1.73 m)
- Plays: Right-handed

Grand Slam singles results
- French Open: 3R (1968)
- Wimbledon: 4R (1973)
- US Open: 3R (1976)

Grand Slam doubles results
- French Open: QF (1971, 1975)
- Wimbledon: 3R (1970)
- US Open: 2R (1970)

Grand Slam mixed doubles results
- French Open: 2R (1975)
- Wimbledon: 4R (1971)
- US Open: 2R (1970)

Ingrid Bentzer (née Löfdahl, born 6 December 1943) is a Swedish former tennis player who was active in the 1960s and 1970s. She was ranked in the world's Top 15 in the 1970s and was the No. 1 ranked Swedish player in 1973 to 1975.

== Tennis career ==
From 1965 to 1978, she competed in 13 editions of the Wimbledon Championships. Her best result in the singles competition was reaching the fourth round in 1973 in which she lost to eight-seeded Olga Morozova. In the doubles event, she reached the quarterfinals of the French Open in 1971 and 1975, partnering Christina Sandberg and Helena Anliot respectively.

During her career, Bentzer won five WTA Tour titles. From 1966 to 1977, she was a member of the Swedish Fed Cup team – she played 19 ties and compiled a record of 15 wins and 16 losses.

== Career finals ==
=== Singles (1 title, 2 runners-up) ===
| Result | W/L | Date | Tournament | Surface | Opponent | Score |
|---|---|---|---|---|---|---|
| Loss | 0–1 | Jul 1970 | Swedish Open, Båstad | Clay | (United States) Peaches Bartkowicz | 1–6, 1–6 |
| Loss | 0–2 | Jul 1971 | Swedish Open, Båstad | Clay | (West Germany) Helga Masthoff | 4–6, 6–1, 6–3 |
| Win | 1–2 | Jul 1972 | Swedish Open, Båstad | Clay | (Sweden) Christina Sandberg | 2–6, 6–3, 8–6 |

== Sports administration ==
After retiring from active tennis Bentzer served as head of Women's Professional Tennis for the International Tennis Federation (ITF) from 1995 through 1999. She was the European head of press for the ATP World Tour and was a consultant to the Monte Carlo Masters.

Bentzer also served as an administrator and sports executive for the squash governing body. She was the chairperson and acting chief executive officer of the Women's Squash Association (WSA) from May 2011 until the beginning of 2015. Bentzer was a board member of the WSA from 2005 through 2014, and served as chairperson from 2008. During her tenure the organisation was rebranded from Women's International Squash Players' Association (WISPA) to its current name of Women's Squash Association.

In March 2014 the International Tennis Hall of Fame appointed Bentzer as the vice-chairperson of the Enshrinee Nominating Committee. Bentzer is a member of the Fed Cup Committee.
