= 1969 Stockholm Open =

1969 edition of the Stockholm Open

- Date: 24–29 November
- Edition: 1st
- Category: ILTF World Circuit
- Draw: 32S / 16D
- Prize money: $25,000
- Surface: Hard / Indoor
- Location: Stockholm, Sweden
- Venue: Kungliga tennishallen

Champions

Singles
- (Socialist Federal Republic of Yugoslavia) Nikola Pilić (United States) Billie Jean King

Doubles
- (Australia) Roy Emerson / (Australia) Rod Laver
Stockholm Open	· 1970 →

The 1969 Stockholm Open also called the Stockholm Open Indoor Championships was a men's tennis tournament played on indoor hard courts at the Kungliga tennishallen in Stockholm, Sweden. The tournament was held from 24 November until 29 November 1969. Unseeded Nikola Pilić won the men's singles title. Billie Jean King won the women's singles title.

== Finals ==
=== Men's singles ===
(Socialist Federal Republic of Yugoslavia) Nikola Pilić defeated (Romania) Ilie Năstase, 6–4, 4–6, 6–2

=== Men's doubles ===
(Australia) Roy Emerson / (Australia) Rod Laver defeated (Spain) Andrés Gimeno / (United Kingdom) Graham Stilwell, 6–4, 6–2

=== Women's singles ===
(United States) Billie Jean King defeated (United States) Julie Heldman 9–7, 6–2.

== See also ==
- 1969 Swedish Open
