= 1975 Custom Credit Australian Indoor Championships – Doubles =

Doubles
- 1975 Custom Credit Australian Indoor Championships

Final
- Champions: (United States) Brian Gottfried (Mexico) Raúl Ramírez
- Runners-up: (Australia) Ross Case (Australia) Geoff Masters
- Score: [8–6]

Details
- Draw: 24
- Seeds: 2

Events
Singles	Doubles
- Custom Credit Australian Indoor Championships

Ross Case and Geoff Masters were the defending champions but lost in the final [8–6] to Brian Gottfried and Raúl Ramírez.

== Seeds ==
1. (United States) Brian Gottfried / (Mexico) Raúl Ramírez (champions)
2. (Australia) John Alexander / (Australia) Phil Dent (first round)

== Draw ==
Key

- Q = Qualifier
- WC = Wild card
- LL = Lucky loser
- Alt = Alternate
- ITF = ITF entry
- PR = Protected ranking
- SR = Special ranking
- SE = Special exempt
- JE = Junior exempt
- JR = Junior Accelerator Programme entrant
- CO = College Accelerator Programme entrant
- NG = Next Gen Accelerator Program entrant
- w/o = Walkover
- r = Retired
- d = Defaulted

=== Finals ===
Semifinals
1	(United States) Brian Gottfried (Mexico) Raúl Ramírez	6	6
(United States) Robert Lutz (United States) Stan Smith	4	4
(Australia) Syd Ball (Australia) Kim Warwick	2	3
2	(Australia) Ross Case (Australia) Geoff Masters	6	6

Final
1	(United States) Brian Gottfried (Mexico) Raúl Ramírez	6	6
(Australia) Ross Case (Australia) Geoff Masters	4	2

=== Top half ===
First round
1	(United States) B Gottfried (Mexico) R Ramírez	[8]
(Australia) R Ruffels (Australia) A Stone	[6]
(Australia) A Gardiner (New Zealand) R Simpson	[8]
(Australia) K Rosewall	[10]
(United States) M Cahill (United States) J Whitlinger	[8]
(Australia) C Kachel (Australia) P McNamara	[6]
(Australia) J Bartlett (Japan) J Kuki	[6]
(Australia) C Dibley (United States) C Richey	[8]

Second round
1	(United States) B Gottfried (Mexico) R Ramírez	[8]
(United States) T Gorman (United States) H Solomon	[6]
(Australia) E Ewert (Australia) B Giltinan	[7]
(Australia) K Rosewall	[9]
(Australia) B Carmichael (United States) S Mayer	[8]
(United States) M Cahill (United States) J Whitlinger	[1]
(Australia) C Dibley (United States) C Richey	[4]
(United States) R Lutz (United States) S Smith	[8]

Quarterfinals
1	(United States) B Gottfried (Mexico) R Ramírez	6	7
(Australia) K Rosewall	4	5
(Australia) B Carmichael (United States) S Mayer	5	6
(United States) R Lutz (United States) S Smith	7	7

Semifinals
1	(United States) B Gottfried (Mexico) R Ramírez	6	6
(United States) R Lutz (United States) S Smith	4	4

=== Bottom half ===
First round
(Australia) J Newcombe (Australia) T Roche	w/o
(United States) H Bunis (United States) N Saviano
(Australia) S Ball (Australia) K Warwick	[9]
(India) A Amritraj (India) V Amritraj	[7]
(Australia) R Case (Australia) G Masters	w/o
(Australia) E McCabe (Australia) R Rheinberger
(Australia) R Reid (Netherlands) R Thung
2	(Australia) J Alexander (Australia) P Dent

Second round
(Australia) J Newcombe (Australia) T Roche	[8]
(Australia) J James (Australia) C Letcher	[6]
(Australia) M Edmondson (Australia) P Kronk	[4]
(Australia) S Ball (Australia) K Warwick	[8]
(Australia) R Case (Australia) G Masters	[8]
(United States) J Delaney (Japan) J Kamiwazumi	[6]
(Australia) D Crealy (Australia) R Keldie	[5]
(Australia) R Reid (Netherlands) R Thung	[8]

Quarterfinals
(Australia) J Newcombe (Australia) T Roche	6	4	5
(Australia) S Ball (Australia) K Warwick	3	6	7
(Australia) R Case (Australia) G Masters	6	6
(Australia) R Reid (Netherlands) R Thung	3	4

Semifinals
(Australia) S Ball (Australia) K Warwick	2	3
(Australia) R Case (Australia) G Masters	6	6
