= Rothmans European Trophy Indoor =

Defunct tennis tournament
- Event name: Rothmans Invitation Indoor (1967-68); Rothmans European Trophy Indoor (1969)
- Tour: ILTF World Circuit
- Founded: 1967
- Abolished: 1969
- Editions: 3
- Location: Crystal Palace, London, England
- Venue: Crystal Palace National Sports Centre
- Surface: Carpet / indoor

The Rothmans European Trophy Indoor was a men's indoor carpet court tennis tournament founded in 1967 as the Rothmans Invitation Indoor. It was played at the Crystal Palace National Sports Centre, in Crystal Palace, London, England until 1969 then was discontinued.

== Finals ==
=== Men's singles ===
Year	Winners	Runners-up	Score
1967	(South Africa) Cliff Drysdale	(United Kingdom) Bobby Wilson	6-4, 6-3
1969	(Denmark) Jan Leschly	(Spain) Manuel Orantes	9-7, 7-5
