= 1975 Custom Credit Australian Indoor Championships – Singles =

Singles
- 1975 Custom Credit Australian Indoor Championships

Final
- Champion: (United States) Stan Smith
- Runner-up: (United States) Robert Lutz
- Score: 7–6, 6–2

Details
- Draw: 48
- Seeds: 8

Events
Singles	Doubles
- Australian Indoor Tennis Championships

John Newcombe was the defending champion but lost in the second round to Vijay Amritraj.

Stan Smith won in the final 7–6, 6–2 against Robert Lutz.

== Seeds ==
1. (Australia) Ken Rosewall (third round)
2. (Australia) John Newcombe (second round)
3. (Australia) Tony Roche (third round)
4. (Australia) John Alexander (quarterfinals)
5. (Mexico) Raúl Ramírez (third round)
6. (United States) Harold Solomon (first round)
7. (United States) Cliff Richey (third round)
8. (United States) Brian Gottfried (semifinals)

== Draw ==
Key

- Q = Qualifier
- WC = Wild card
- LL = Lucky loser
- Alt = Alternate
- ITF = ITF entry
- PR = Protected ranking
- SR = Special ranking
- SE = Special exempt
- JE = Junior exempt
- JR = Junior Accelerator Programme entrant
- CO = College Accelerator Programme entrant
- NG = Next Gen Accelerator Program entrant
- w/o = Walkover
- r = Retired
- d = Defaulted

=== Finals ===
Semifinals
(United States) Robert Lutz	6	6
8	(United States) Brian Gottfried	3	4
(United States) Stan Smith	6	6	6
(Australia) Ross Case	7	3	1

Final
(United States) Robert Lutz	6	2
(United States) Stan Smith	7	6

=== Top half ===
==== Section 1 ====
First round
(Australia) D Crealy	6	6
(Australia) R Rheinberger	0	4
(United States) H Bunis	7	6
(Japan) J Kamiwazumi	5	4
(Australia) J James	2	2
(United States) S Mayer	6	6
(Australia) C Letcher	4	2
5	(Mexico) R Ramírez	6	6

Second round
1	(Australia) K Rosewall	4	6	6
(Australia) D Crealy	6	4	1
(United States) H Bunis	3	4
(United States) R Lutz	6	6
(Australia) R Keldie	0	3
(United States) S Mayer	6	6
(Australia) P Dent	4	0
5	(Mexico) R Ramírez	6	6

Third round
1	(Australia) K Rosewall	7	3	6
(United States) R Lutz	5	6	7
(United States) S Mayer	6	6
5	(Mexico) R Ramírez	3	3

Quarterfinals
(United States) R Lutz	6	7
(United States) S Mayer	3	5

==== Section 2 ====
First round
(United States) R Reid	5	6	7
(Australia) B Carmichael	7	3	6
(United States) N Saviano	6	7	2
(Australia) A Stone	7	6	6
(New Zealand) R Simpson	2	5
(Australia) A Gardiner	6	7
(Australia) M Anderson	5	4
8	(United States) B Gottfried	7	6

Second round
4	(Australia) J Alexander	6	6
(United States) R Reid	3	1
(Australia) A Stone	6	7
(Australia) K Warwick	3	5
(United States) C Owens	1	1
(Australia) A Gardiner	6	6
(Australia) B Giltinan	4	4
8	(United States) B Gottfried	6	6

Third round
4	(Australia) J Alexander	4	6	7
(Australia) A Stone	6	1	6
(Australia) A Gardiner	3	5
8	(United States) B Gottfried	6	7

Quarterfinals
4	(Australia) J Alexander	2	3
8	(United States) B Gottfried	6	6

=== Bottom half ===
==== Section 3 ====
First round
(Australia) S Ball	4	4
(United States) M Cahill	6	6
(Japan) J Kuki	1	0
(United States) S Smith	6	6
(United States) T Gorman	6	3	6
(Netherlands) R Thung	4	6	3
(Australia) C Dibley	3	2
3	(Australia) T Roche	6	6

Second round
7	(United States) C Richey	6	6
(United States) M Cahill	3	3
(United States) S Smith	6	6
(India) A Amritraj	2	2
(Australia) M Edmondson	3	2
(United States) T Gorman	6	6
(Australia) R Ruffels	5	4
3	(Australia) T Roche	7	6

Third round
7	(United States) C Richey	6	3	2
(United States) S Smith	1	6	6
(United States) T Gorman	7	7
3	(Australia) T Roche	6	6

Quarterfinals
(United States) S Smith	6	7
(United States) T Gorman	4	6

==== Section 4 ====
First round
6	(United States) H Solomon	4	6	3
(Australia) P Kronk	6	2	6
(Australia) P McNamara	2	3
(Australia) R Case	6	6
(United States) J Delaney	6	6
(Australia) E Ewert	1	1
(India) V Amritraj	6	6
(Australia) J Bartlett	4	1

Second round
(Australia) P Kronk	7	6
(Australia) C Kachel	6	2
(Australia) R Case	6	6
(United States) J Whitlinger	4	3
(Australia) G Masters	6	6	7
(United States) J Delaney	3	7	6
(India) V Amritraj	7	6
2	(Australia) J Newcombe	5	1

Third round
(Australia) P Kronk	2	0
(Australia) R Case	6	6
(Australia) G Masters	6	6
(India) V Amritraj	2	1

Quarterfinals
(Australia) R Case	4	7	6
(Australia) G Masters	6	6	3
