= 1975 Custom Credit Australian Indoor Championships =

- Date: 13–19 October
- Edition: 3rd
- Category: Grand Prix (Group AA)
- Draw: 64S / 32D
- Prize money: $100,000
- Surface: Hard / Indoor
- Location: Sydney, Australia
- Venue: Hordern Pavilion

Champions

Singles
- (United States) Stan Smith

Doubles
- (United States) Brian Gottfried / (Mexico) Raúl Ramírez
- Australian Indoor Tennis Championships

The 1975 Custom Credit Australian Indoor Championships was a men's professional tennis tournament played on indoor hard courts at the Hordern Pavilion in Sydney, Australia and was part of the 1975 Commercial Union Assurance Grand Prix as a Group AA category event. The tournament was held from 13 October through 19 October 1975. Unseeded Stan Smith won the singles title.

== Finals ==
=== Singles ===
(United States) Stan Smith defeated (United States) Robert Lutz 7–6, 6–2

- It was Smith's 6th title of the year and the 55th of his career.

=== Doubles ===
(United States) Brian Gottfried / (Mexico) Raúl Ramírez defeated (Australia) Ross Case / (Australia) Geoff Masters 6–4, 6–2

- It was Gottfried's 13th title of the year and the 21st of his career. It was Ramírez's 15th title of the year and the 24th of his career.
