= 1970 U.S. Clay Court Championships =

Tennis tournament

- Date: July 27 – August 2
- Edition: 2nd
- Draw: 64S / 32D
- Prize money: $50,000
- Surface: Clay / outdoor
- Location: Indianapolis, Indiana, US
- Venue: Woodstock Country Club

Champions

Men's singles
- (United States) Cliff Richey

Women's singles
- (United States) Linda Tuero

Men's doubles
- (United States) Clark Graebner / (United States) Arthur Ashe

Women's doubles
- (United States) Rosie Casals / (France) Gail Chanfreau
- U.S. Clay Court Championships

The 1970 U.S. Clay Court Championships was a combined men's and women's tennis tournament that was part of the Grand Prix. It was held at the Woodstock Country Club in Indianapolis, Indiana in the United States and played on outdoor clay courts. It was the second edition of the tournament in the Open Era and was held in from July 27 through August 2, 1970. Cliff Richey and Linda Tuero won the singles titles.

== Finals ==
=== Men's singles ===
(United States) Cliff Richey defeated (United States) Stan Smith 6–2, 10–8, 3–6, 6–1

=== Women's singles ===
(United States) Linda Tuero defeated (France) Gail Chanfreau 7–5, 6–1

=== Men's doubles ===
(United States) Clark Graebner / (United States) Arthur Ashe defeated (Romania) Ilie Năstase / (Romania) Ion Țiriac 2–6, 6–4, 6–4

=== Women's doubles ===
(United States) Rosie Casals / (France) Gail Chanfreau defeated (Australia) Helen Gourlay / (South Africa) Pat Walkden 6–2, 6–2
