= 1971 Swedish Open =

- Date: 5–11 July
- Edition: 24th
- Category: Grand Prix (Group C)
- Draw: 32S / 16D
- Surface: Clay / outdoor
- Location: Båstad, Sweden

Champions

Men's singles
- (Romania) Ilie Năstase

Women's singles
- (West Germany) Helga Masthoff

Men's doubles
- (Romania) Ilie Năstase / (Romania) Ion Țiriac

Women's doubles
- (West Germany) Helga Masthoff / (West Germany) Heide Orth
← 1970 ·	Swedish Open	· 1972 →

The 1971 Swedish Open was a combined men's and women's tennis tournament played on outdoor clay courts held in Båstad, Sweden. The event was classified as a Group C category tournament and was part of the 1971 Grand Prix circuit. It was the 24th edition of the tournament and was held from 5 July through 11 July 1971. Ilie Năstase and Helga Masthoff won the singles titles.

== Finals ==
=== Men's singles ===
(Romania) Ilie Năstase defeated (Denmark) Jan Leschly 6–7, 6–2, 6–1, 6–4

=== Women's singles ===
(West Germany) Helga Masthoff defeated (Sweden) Ingrid Bentzer 4–6, 6–1, 6–3

=== Men's doubles ===
(Romania) Ilie Năstase / (Romania) Ion Țiriac defeated (Chile) Jaime Pinto Bravo / (United States) Butch Seewagen 7–6, 6–1

=== Women's doubles ===
(West Germany) Helga Masthoff / (West Germany) Heide Orth defeated (Chile) Ana María Pinto Bravo / (United States) Linda Tuero 6–1, 6–2
