= 1972 Swedish Open =

- Date: 10–16 July
- Edition: 25th
- Category: Grand Prix (Group C)
- Draw: 32S
- Prize money: $25,000
- Surface: Clay / outdoor
- Location: Båstad, Sweden

Champions

Singles
- (Spain) Manuel Orantes

Doubles
- (Spain) Manuel Orantes / (Spain) Juan Gisbert
← 1971 ·	Swedish Open	· 1973 →

The 1972 Swedish Open was a men's tennis tournament played on outdoor clay courts held in Båstad, Sweden. It was classified as a Group C category tournament and was part of the 1972 Grand Prix circuit. It was the 25th edition of the tournament and was held from 10 July until 16 July 1972. Manuel Orantes won the singles title.

== Finals ==
=== Singles ===
(Spain) Manuel Orantes defeated (Romania) Ilie Năstase 6–4, 6–3, 6–1

=== Doubles ===
(Spain) Manuel Orantes / (Spain) Juan Gisbert defeated (Australia) Neale Fraser / (Romania) Ilie Năstase 6–3, 7–6

== See also ==
- 1972 Swedish Pro Tennis Championships
- 1972 Stockholm Open
