= 1969 Swedish Open =

- Date: 7 – 13 July
- Edition: 22nd
- Draw: 32S/16D
- Surface: Clay / Outdoor
- Location: Båstad, Sweden

Champions

Men's singles
- (Spain) Manuel Santana

Men's doubles
- (Romania) Ilie Năstase / (Romania) Ion Țiriac
- Swedish Open

The 1969 Swedish Open was a men's tennis tournament played on outdoor clay courts held in Båstad, Sweden. It was the 22nd edition of the tournament and was held from 7 July through 13 July 1969. Manuel Santana won the singles title.

== Finals ==
=== Singles ===
(Spain) Manuel Santana defeated (Romania) Ion Țiriac 8–6, 6–4, 6–1

=== Doubles ===
(Romania) Ilie Năstase / (Romania) Ion Țiriac defeated (Spain) Manuel Orantes / (Spain) Manuel Santana

== See also ==
- 1969 Stockholm Open
