= 1970 Stockholm Open =

- Date: 1–7 November
- Edition: 2nd
- Category: Grand Prix tennis circuit
- Draw: 32S/16D
- Surface: Hard / Indoor
- Location: Stockholm, Sweden
- Venue: Kungliga tennishallen

Champions

Singles
- (United States) Stan Smith

Doubles
- (United States) Arthur Ashe / (United States) Stan Smith
- Stockholm Open

The 1970 Stockholm Open was a men's tennis tournament played on indoor hard courts at Kungliga tennishallen in Stockholm, Sweden. The tournament was held from 1 November through 7 November 1970 and was a part of the 1970 Pepsi-Cola Grand Prix. Stan Smith defeated Arthur Ashe to win the singles title.

== Finals ==
=== Singles ===
(United States) Stan Smith defeated (United States) Arthur Ashe, 5–7, 6–4, 6–4

=== Doubles ===
(United States) Arthur Ashe / (United States) Stan Smith defeated (Australia) Bob Carmichael / (Australia) Owen Davidson, 6–0, 5–7, 7–5
