= Jan Leschly =

Danish businessman and tennis player (born 1940)

- Country (sports): Denmark
- Born: 11 September 1940 (age 86) Jutland, Denmark
- Turned pro: 1957 (amateur)
- Retired: 1973
- Plays: Left-handed

Singles
- Career record: 219–112
- Career titles: 18
- Highest ranking: No. 10 (1967, Lance Tingay)

Grand Slam singles results
- French Open: 3R (1971)
- Wimbledon: 4R (1966)
- US Open: SF (1967)

Grand Slam doubles results
- French Open: 4R (1971)
- Wimbledon: QF (1966)

Grand Slam mixed doubles results
- Wimbledon: 2R (1959, 1960, 1967)

Jan Leschly (born 11 September 1940) is a Danish businessman and former professional tennis player. He was a semifinalist in the men's singles at the 1967 U.S. National Championships and a quarterfinalist in doubles at the 1966 Wimbledon Championships. From 1957 to 1973, he won 18 career titles in singles.

== Tennis career ==
He was a tour tennis professional from the late the 1950s to the early 1970s. In July 1957, he won his first title the East of England Championships on grass at Felixstowe. From 1959 to 1971, he participated in nine Wimbledon Championships and achieved his best result in 1966 when he reached the fourth round of the singles event, and with his countryman Jørgen Ulrich (uncle of Lars Ulrich whose father is Torben Ulrich), he reached the quarterfinals of the doubles event. Jan Leschly was in the semifinals of the US Championship at Forest Hills in 1967, losing to Clark Graebner in five sets.

He was ranked World No. 10 for 1967 in Lance Tingay's amateur rankings for The Daily Telegraph. In 1972, he won his last title at the Scandinavian Indoor Championships, played on carpet courts at Copenhagen. In 1973, played his final tournament at the Coast Championship at Rungsted, losing in the semifinals to Lars Elvstrom.

== Career finals ==
=== Singles 33 (18–15) ===
Titles by Surface
Clay – Outdoor (9)
Grass – Outdoor (3)
Hard – Outdoor (0)
Carpet – Indoor (7)
Wood – Indoor (8)

Result	No.	Date	Tournament	Surface	Opponent	Score
Win	1.	Jul 1957	East of England Championships	Grass	(United Kingdom) Gordon Talbot	1–6, 6–2, 6–3
Win	2.	Jul 1958	East of England Championships	Grass	(Denmark) Claus Storm Pallesen	6–0, 6–0
Loss	3.	Aug 1959	Danish National Championships	Clay	(Denmark) Kurt Nielsen	6–0, 6–2, 6–4
Loss	4.	Jan 1961	Danish Covered Court Championships	Wood (i)	(Denmark) Jørgen Ulrich	6–4, 6–8, 6–2, 6–2
Loss	5.	Nov 1961	King's Cup	Wood (i)	(Sweden) Ulf Schmidt	6–4, 6–2
Win	6.	Dec 1961	Copenhagen Indoor	Wood (i)	(Sweden) Torsten Johansson	6–2, 5–7, 6–3, 10–8
Loss	7.	Jan 1962	Danish Covered Court Championships	Wood (i)	(Denmark) Jørgen Ulrich	6–2, 6–3, 3–6, 6–4
Win	8.	Mar 1962	Danish International Championships	Clay	(Sweden) Torsten Johansson	6–3, 6–1, 1–6, 6–3
Win	9.	Dec 1962	Copenhagen Indoor	Wood (i)	(Denmark) Jørgen Ulrich	12–10, 3–6, 6–3, 7–5
Win	10.	Jan 1963	Danish Covered Court Championships	Wood (i)	(Denmark) Jørgen Ulrich	4–6, 9–11, 8–6, 8–6, 6–4
Loss	11.	Mar 1963	Moscow International Championships	?	(Soviet Union) Toomas Leius	6–0, 1–6, 6–3, 6–2
Win	12.	Aug 1963	Danish National Championships	Clay	(Denmark) Jørgen Ulrich	6–2, 6–3, 6–4
Win	13.	Aug 1964	Danish National Championships	Clay	(Denmark) Torben Ulrich	3–6, 5–7, 7–5, 8–6, 6–0
Loss	14.	Nov 1965	King's Cup Final (London)	Wood (i)	(United Kingdom) Bobby Wilson	3–6, 6–2, 6–4, 12–10
Win	15.	Jan 1966	Danish Covered Court Championships	Wood (i)	(Denmark) Carl-Edvard Hedelund	6–0, 6–4, 4–6, 6–1
Win	16.	Aug 1966	Danish National Championships	Clay	(Denmark) Carl-Edvard Hedelund	6–0, 6–4, 4–6, 6–1
Loss	17.	Mar 1967	South African Championships	Hard	(Spain) Manuel Santana	6–2, 2–6, 6–4, 3–6, 4–6
Loss	18.	Jul 1967	Travemünde International	Clay	(Romania) Ilie Năstase	4–6, 3–6, 2–6
Loss	19.	Aug 1967	Danish National Championships	Clay	(Denmark) Jorgen Ulrich	3–6, 6–4, 6–0, 6–1
Loss	20.	Nov 1967	Queensland Hard Court Championships	Clay	(Australia) Roy Emerson	6–4, 12–10
Win	21.	Feb 1968	Scandinavian Indoor Championships	Carpet (i)	(Soviet Union) Alex Metreveli	4–6, 12–10, 6–3, 6–4
Loss	22.	Feb 1968	U.S. National Indoor Tennis Championships	Carpet (i)	(Spain) Manuel Santana	6–8, 3–6
Win	23.	Feb 1968	Macon Indoor	Carpet (i)	(United Kingdom) Mike Sangster	6-3, 6-4, 5-7, 6-4
Loss	24.	Mar 1968	Concord International Indoor	Carpet (i)	(United States) Arthur Ashe	3–6, 13–15
Win	25.	Augt 1968	Copenhagen Tournament	?	(Australia) Martin Mulligan	3–6, 6–2, 4–6, 6–1, 6–2
Win	26.	Jan 1969	Danish Covered Court Championships	Carpet (i)	(Denmark) Carl-Edvard Hedelund	6–4, 6–3, 6–3
Win	27.	Feb 1969	Rothmans European Trophy Indoor,	Carpet (i)	(Spain) Manuel Orantes	9–7, 7–5
Win	28.	Aug 1969	Danish National Championships	Clay	(Denmark) Jørgen Ulrich	6–2, 6–2, 6–1
Loss	29.	Aug 1969	Copenhagen Tournament	?	(Australia) Martin Mulligan	4-6, 6-4, 7-9, 14-12, 1-6
Win	20.	Aug 1970	Danish National Championships	Clay	(Denmark) Jorgen Ulrich	6–3, 6–4, 6–4
Loss	31.	Jun 1971	Chichester International	Grass	(United Kingdom) Gerald Battrick	2-6, 8-9
Loss	32.	Jul 1971	Swedish Open Bastaad	Clay	(Romania) Ilie Năstase	7–6, 2–6, 1–6, 4–6
Win	33.	Feb 1972	Scandinavian Indoor Championships	Carpet (i)	(South Africa) Ray Moore	6–1, 11–9, 6–3

== Work career ==
Leschly has been the chairman and chief executive officer of Care Capital LLC, a private equity firm, since May 2000. Other positions:

- Chief Executive and Director, SmithKline Beecham, a company that develops and markets pharmaceuticals and over-the-counter medicines, 1994 to May 2000.
- Director, American Express, Viacom, Maersk, and Dynavax Technologies Corporation.
- Member, Advisory Board of Daimler Chrysler and the Emory University Business School Dean's Advisory Council.

== See also ==
- List of Denmark Davis Cup team representatives

Business positions
Preceded by Robert Bauman	Chief Executive of SmithKline Beecham; April 1994 - April 2000	Succeeded by Jean-Pierre Garnier
