= Danish Seniors National Championships (Closed) =

Tournament information
- Founded: 1889; 137 years ago
- Location: Copenhagen; Denmark
- Venue: Various
- Surface: Clay; Hard, outdoors

Current champions
- Men's singles: (Denmark) Andreas Hach-Laulund (2018)

The Danish Seniors National Championships (Closed) also known is a men's and women's tennis tournament founded in 1889 as the Danish National Championships . also known as the Danish Outdoor Championships The tournament ran annually through from 1921 as part of the worldwide ILTF World Circuit until 1972. In 1973 it became part of the ILTF independent circuit until 1982 when it was dropped from that schedule. Today it is and ITF Seniors G3 tournament.

== History ==
In 1876 the Kjøbenhavns Boldklub is multi-sports club based in Copenhagen. The club was founded on 26 April 1876 on the grassy fields in the suburbs of Copenhagen which later became Fælledparken. Tennis has been played since 1883. In 1889 the club held the first unofficial Danish National Closed Championships that ran annually until 1902.

In 1904 the Danish Sport Federation (Dansk Boldspil Union) that was founded in 1889 took over the responsibility of organising the national championships. In 1920 the Danish Tennis Association (Dansk Lawn Tennis Forbund) was founded, it then took over responsibility for staging this event till today.

The tournament ran annually through from 1921 to 1968 as part of the worldwide ILTF Circuit. In 1959 it became part of the ILTF Independent Tour until 1982 when it was dropped from that schedule. Today it is and ITF Seniors G3 tournament.
