= Stan Smith =

American tennis player (born 1946)

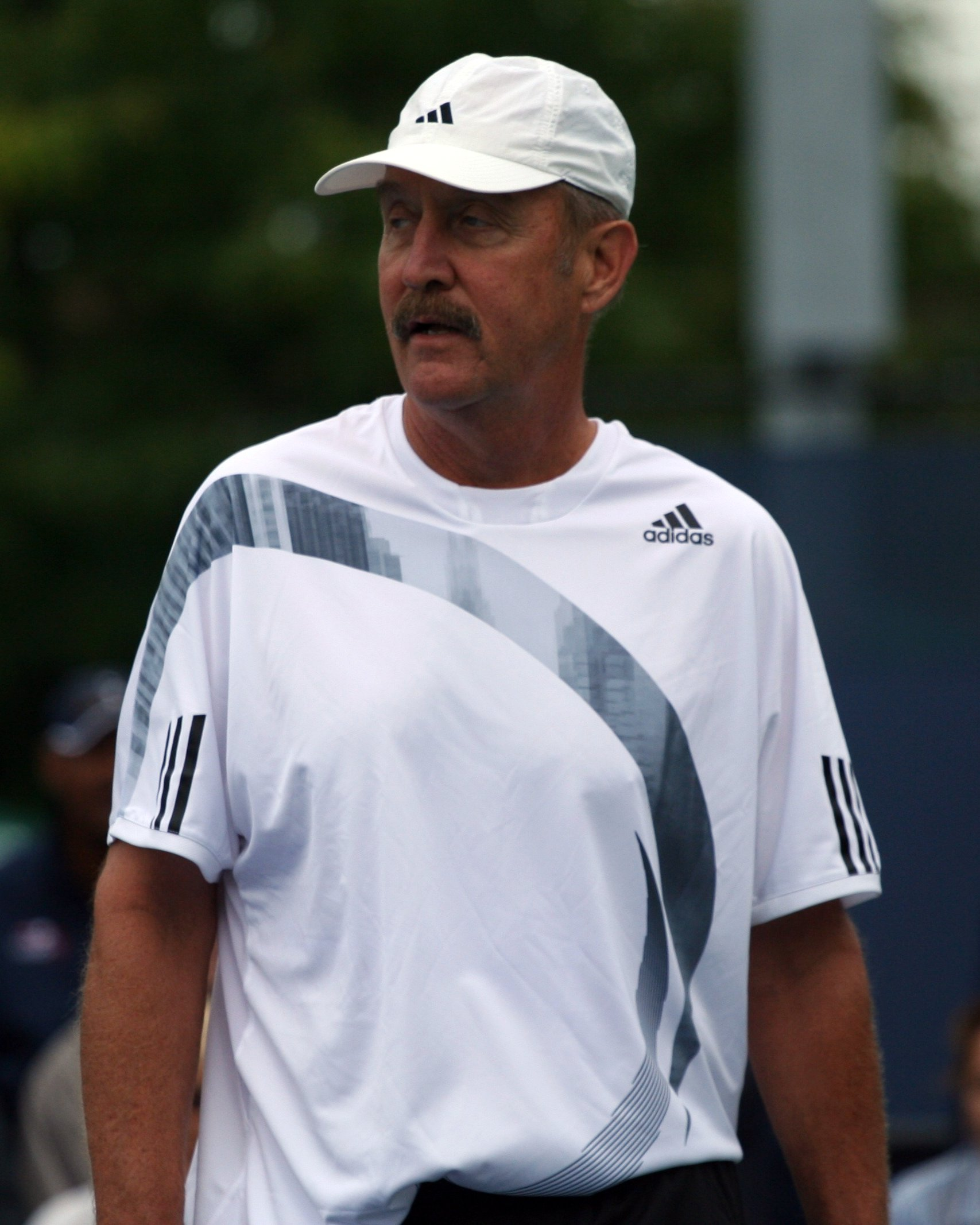
- Smith in 2009
- Full name: Stanley Roger Smith
- Country (sports): United States
- Residence: Hilton Head Island, South Carolina, US
- Born: December 14, 1946 (age 79) Pasadena, California, US
- Height: 6 ft 4 in (1.93 m)
- Turned pro: 1969 (amateur from 1964)
- Retired: 1985
- Plays: Right-handed (one-handed backhand)
- Prize money: $1,420,869
- Int. Tennis HoF: 1987 (member page)

Singles
- Career record: 950–383 in pre-Open-Era & Open Era
- Career titles: 64 (48 open era titles listed by ATP)
- Highest ranking: No. 1 (1971, Judith Elian)

Grand Slam singles results
- Australian Open: 3R (1970, 1975, 1977^{Dec})
- French Open: QF (1971, 1972)
- Wimbledon: W (1972)
- US Open: W (1971)

Other tournaments
- Tour Finals: W (1970)
- WCT Finals: W (1973)

Doubles
- Career record: 558–201
- Career titles: 56
- Highest ranking: No. 1 (March 2, 1981)

Grand Slam doubles results
- Australian Open: W (1970)
- French Open: F (1971, 1974)
- Wimbledon: F (1972, 1974, 1980, 1981)
- US Open: W (1968, 1974, 1978, 1980)

Team competitions
- Davis Cup: W (1968, 1969, 1970, 1971, 1972, 1979, 1981)

Stanley Roger Smith (born December 14, 1946) is an American retired professional tennis player. A world No. 1 player and two-time major singles champion (at the 1971 US Open and 1972 Wimbledon Championships), Smith also paired with Bob Lutz to create one of the most successful doubles teams of all time.

In 1970, Smith won the inaugural year-end championships title. In 1972, he was the year-end world No. 1 singles player. In 1973, he won his second and last year end championship title at the Dallas WCT Finals. In addition, he won four Grand Prix Championship Series titles.

Smith is a past President of the International Tennis Hall of Fame and an ITHF Life Trustee. Outside tennis circles, Smith is best known as the namesake of a line of tennis shoes made by Adidas.

== Early life ==
Smith was born in Pasadena, California on December 14, 1946. He was the youngest of three sons. When he was 15 he was sponsored by the Pasadena Tennis Patrons, an organization that helped junior tennis players. At the age of 16, in 1963 he saw Arthur Ashe, who was three years older than him, play at the Davis Cup, and, inspired, went home and wrote down a set of goals for himself, which included "be best in the world". In his later high school years he got sponsorship from the Southern California Tennis Association and at the urging of Perry T. Jones, the association's head, he began playing doubles with Bob Lutz. He was also coached by Pancho Segura on the public courts of Pasadena.

In 1964 at the age of 17 he won the U.S. Junior 18-and-under championships. From 1965 through 1968 he attended the University of Southern California where he was a three-time All-American. He won the 1968 NCAA Division I Singles title and in 1967 and 1968 the Doubles title with Bob Lutz.

On December 14, 1970, his 24th birthday, he got his draft notice and two days later was inducted into the U.S. Army. Recognizing him as a unique asset, the military allowed him to continue to compete in tournaments, and he spent time on recruitment speaking tours and gave clinics at military bases and inner-city areas. He served for two years.

== Career ==
In 1971 Smith was seeded fourth at Wimbledon. He didn’t drop a set in the first three rounds and met Roy Emerson in the fourth round, defeating the Australian in four sets. He beat the New Zealander Onny Parun in straight sets in the quarterfinal, before beating fellow American Tom Gorman in the semifinal. Smith lost the Wimbledon final to second-seeded Australian John Newcombe in five sets. One analyst stated “Although both men relied on power, there were relatively few errors despite the fierce struggle". Smith entered the 1971 US Open as the second seed behind Newcombe. He eased through the first two rounds before beating Tom Leonard in the third round. Smith defeated the Czech Milan Holeček in the fourth round after his opponent retired midway through the second set. Victories against Marty Riessen and fourth-seeded Tom Okker followed as Smith set up a final against unseeded Jan Kodeš. Smith beat Kodeš in four sets, winning his first Grand Slam singles title. After losing the first set, Smith changed his tactics: "I decided I would hit slower but put more spin on my serve" said Smith afterwards and he also took charge at the net more. That year Smith and John Newcombe were joint recipients of The Martini and Rossi Award for the best player, voted for by 11 journalists and were co-ranked world No. 1 by Judith Elian.

In 1972 Smith reached the quarter finals of the French Open for a second consecutive year. He went into the Wimbledon Championships as top seed. The first two rounds saw him achieve straight sets victories over Hans Joachim Plotz and Hank Irvine. He beat American Sandy Mayer in the next round and then beat Australian Ian Fletcher to qualify for the quarter finals. He defeated Alex Metreveli in the quarters to face off against Jan Kodeš in the semi-finals. In a rematch of the US Open final, Smith beat his opponent in four sets. Smith beat second seed Ilie Năstase in the Wimbledon final in five sets. "Old-timers at the Club, who've seen all the finals back to the 1930's, said the match was the best since Australia's Jack Crawford beat Ellsworth Vines of America, 6-4 in the fifth, to win in 1933." Smith went into the US Open as top seed hoping to defend his title. In the fourth round Smith beat Andrés Gimeno in a five set thriller. However, he was unable to progress beyond the quarter-finals, losing to Arthur Ashe. Năstase won the title. That year Smith won the 'Martini and Rossi' Award and was ranked world No. 1 by Elian, Tingay, World Tennis, Collins, Frank Rostron and Rex Bellamy.

1973 saw Smith have a less successful year in the Grand Slams. After failing to progress beyond the fourth round of Roland Garros he missed Wimbledon in its "boycott year" when many leading tour players withdrew. Despite his disappointments in the biggest tournaments, Smith defeated the legendary Australian Rod Laver at both the Atlanta WCT and the St Louis WCT, as well as beating him in the Brussels WCT, marking three significant victories over one of the greatest players to play the game. He had a stronger showing at the US Open. Smith reached the quarter finals and beat Onny Parun to set up a match against Jan Kodeš in the semi finals and beat. Smith was defeated by Kodeš in four sets.

In 1974 Smith once again advanced to the latter stages of Wimbledon. At the semi-finals stage he was beaten by the Australian Ken Rosewall. He reached the quarter-finals at the US Open for a fifth consecutive year, but suffered defeat to unseeded American Roscoe Tanner in the quarters. This would be the last time Smith reached the latter stages of a Grand Slam singles tournament. He won the doubles event of the tournament with fellow American Bob Lutz. In May 1973 Smith was seeded first at the World Championship Tennis Finals and won the title, beating Arthur Ashe in a four-sets final.

In October 1975, Smith win the Australian Indoor Championships in Sydney, but had to wait two years to win his next tournament, the Pacific Southwest Open in April 1977. 1978 saw him lose to Jimmy Connors in the final of the Denver Open. He managed to win the US Open doubles titles in 1978 with partner Bob Lutz as they continued their impressive partnership. He won his last singles title by beating Johan Kriek in the final of the Frankfurt Grand Prix in March 1980. That year he retained his US Open doubles crown, again being partnered by Lutz. Smith’s last appearance at a Grand Slam doubles event final came in 1981, where he and Lutz finished runners-up at Wimbledon to Peter Fleming and John McEnroe.

== Legacy ==
In his 1979 autobiography, Jack Kramer, the long-time tennis promoter and great player himself, ranked Smith as one of the 21 best players of all time.

Smith was inducted into the International Tennis Hall of Fame in 1987.

In 2005, TENNIS magazine ranked Smith as 35th in its "40 Greatest Players of the TENNIS Era".

Following his playing career, Smith became active as a coach for the United States Tennis Association. He has his own tennis academy with Billy Stearns, located on Hilton Head Island, South Carolina.

Smith is the subject of the 2024 documentary film Who is Stan Smith?, by filmmaker Danny Lee.

== Tennis shoes ==
To the general public, Stan Smith is probably best known for the line of tennis shoes which Adidas renamed after him in 1978. Although the Adidas Stan Smith shoe is not recommended for modern tennis playing, it continues to be a widely available iconic fashion brand.

== Personal life ==
In 1974, Smith married Princeton University tennis player, Marjory Gengler. They later mentored South African tennis player Mark Mathabane, helping increase pressure on the South African government to end apartheid. Smith lives in Hilton Head with his wife and four children, all of whom competed in collegiate tennis.

== Grand Slam finals ==
=== Singles: 3 (2 titles / 1 runner-up) ===
Result	Year	Championship	Surface	Opponent	Score
Loss	1971	Wimbledon	Grass	(Australia) John Newcombe	3–6, 7–5, 6–2, 4–6, 4–6
Win	1971	US Open	Grass	(Czechoslovakia) Jan Kodeš	3–6, 6–3, 6–2, 7–6^{(5–3)}
Win	1972	Wimbledon	Grass	(Romania) Ilie Năstase	4–6, 6–3, 6–3, 4–6, 7–5

=== Doubles: 13 (5 titles / 8 runners-up) ===
Result	Year	Championship	Surface	Partner	Opponents	Score
Win	1968	US Open	Grass	(United States) Bob Lutz	(United States) Arthur Ashe (Spain) Andrés Gimeno	11–9, 6–1, 7–5
Win	1970	Australian Open	Grass	(United States) Bob Lutz	(Australia) John Alexander (Australia) Phil Dent	6–3, 8–6, 6–3
Loss	1971	French Open	Clay	(United States) Tom Gorman	(United States) Arthur Ashe (United States) Marty Riessen	6–4, 3–6, 4–6, 9–11
Loss	1971	US Open	Grass	(United States) Erik van Dillen	(Australia) John Newcombe (United Kingdom) Roger Taylor	7–6, 3–6, 6–7, 6–4, 6–7
Loss	1972	Wimbledon	Grass	(United States) Erik van Dillen	(South Africa) Bob Hewitt (South Africa) Frew McMillan	2–6, 2–6, 7–9
Loss	1974	French Open	Clay	(United States) Bob Lutz	(Australia) Dick Crealy (New Zealand) Onny Parun	3–6, 2–6, 6–3, 7–5, 1–6
Loss	1974	Wimbledon	Grass	(United States) Bob Lutz	(Australia) John Newcombe (Australia) Tony Roche	6–8, 4–6, 4–6
Win	1974	US Open	Grass	(United States) Bob Lutz	(Chile) Patricio Cornejo (Chile) Jaime Fillol	6–3, 6–3
Win	1978	US Open	Hard	(United States) Bob Lutz	(United States) Marty Riessen (United States) Sherwood Stewart	1–6, 7–5, 6–3
Loss	1979	US Open	Hard	(United States) Bob Lutz	(United States) Peter Fleming (United States) John McEnroe	2–6, 4–6
Loss	1980	Wimbledon	Grass	(United States) Bob Lutz	(Australia) Peter McNamara (Australia) Paul McNamee	6–7, 3–6, 7–6, 4–6
Win	1980	US Open	Hard	(United States) Bob Lutz	(United States) Peter Fleming (United States) John McEnroe	7–6, 3–6, 6–1, 3–6, 6–3
Loss	1981	Wimbledon	Grass	(United States) Bob Lutz	(United States) Peter Fleming (United States) John McEnroe	4–6, 4–6, 4–6

== Career finals ==
=== Singles: 95 (64 titles / 31 runners-up) ===
Result	W–L	Year	Tournament	Surface	Opponent	Score
Win	1–0	1964	Pasadena Metropolitan, Pasadena	?	(United States) Robert Potthast	6–1, 3–6, 6–3
Loss	1–1	1965	Ojai Tennis Tournament, Ojai	?	(United States) Charlie Pasarell	3–6, 1–6
Win	2–1	1965	Tucson Invitation, Tucson	?	(United States) Allen Fox	6–1, 4–6, 8–6
Win	3–1	1966	Western Indoor Championship, Salt Lake City	Carpet (i)	(United States) Charlie Passarell	7–5, 2–6, 8–6
Loss	3–2	1966	Southern California Championships, Los Angeles	Hard	(United States) Arthur Ashe	4–6, 2–6
Win	4–2	1966	US Hard Court Championship, La Jolla	Hard	(New Zealand) Ian Crookenden	6–4, 6–1
Loss	4–3	1966	National Championship, Coral Gables	?	(United States) Charlie Passarell	4–6, 6–3, 6–2, 3–6, 1–6
Loss	4–4	1966	Pennsylvania Lawn Tennis Championships, Haverford	Grass	(United States) Clark Graebner	3–6, 6–4, 3–6
Loss	4–5	1966	Tucson Invitation, Tucson	?	(United States) Marty Riessen	6–8, 2–6
Win	5–5	1967	Phoenix Thunderbird Championships, Phoenix	Hard	(United States) Allen Fox	7–5, 6–3
Win	6–5	1967	Southern California Championships, Los Angeles	Hard	(United States) Allen Fox	7–5, 13–11
Win	7–5	1967	Southern California Tennis Classic, Pasadena	?	(United States) Bob Lutz	6–4, 7–5
Win	8–5	1967	US Hard Court Championship, Sacramento (2)	Hard	(United States) Gary Rose	6–4, 6–3
Win	9–5	1967	Western Indoor Championship, Salt Lake City (2)	Carpet (i)	(United States) Jim Osborne	6–2, 6–2
Win	10–5	1968	Phoenix Thunderbird Championships, Phoenix (2)	Hard	(United States) Bob Lutz	4–6, 6–2, 6–1
↓ Open Era ↓
Win	11–5	1968	Southern California Championships, Los Angeles (2)	Hard	(United States) Rick Leach	6–4, 6–3
Loss	11–6	1968	Central California Championships, Sacramento	?	(United States) Clark Graebner	8–10, 4–6, 2–6
Win	12–6	1968	National Championship, San Antonio		(United States) Bob Lutz	3–6, 6–1, 6–0, 6–2
Loss	12–7	1968	U.S. Men's Clay Court Championships, Milwaukee	Clay	(United States) Clark Graebner	3–6, 5–7, 0–6
Win	13–7	1968	Pacific Coast Championships, Berkeley*	Hard (i)	(United States) Jim McManus	10–8, 6–1, 6–1
Win	14–7	1968	US Hard Court Championship, La Jolla* (3)	Hard	(United States) Roy Barth	6–1, 9–7
Win	15–7	1968	Dewar Cup, London*	Carpet (i)	(United Kingdom) Mark Cox	6–4, 6–4
Loss	15–8	1968	Queensland Championships, Brisbane	Grass	(United States) Arthur Ashe	4–6, 6–1, 7–9, 6–4, 5–7
Win	16–8	1969	Victorian Championships, Melbourne*	Grass	(United States) Arthur Ashe	14–12, 6–8, 6–3, 8–6
Win	17–8	1969	U.S. National Indoor Championships, Salisbury*	Hard (i)	(United Arab Republic) Ismail El Shafei	6–3, 6–8, 6–4, 6–4
Win	18–8	1969	Dallas Invitation, Dallas*	Carpet (i)	(Brazil) Thomaz Koch	6–3, 6–4
Win	19–8	1969	Southern California Championships Los Angeles (3)	Hard	(United States) Bob Lutz	6–3, 6–4
Win	20–8	1969	Eastern Grass Court Championships, South Orange*	Grass	(United States) Clark Graebner	6–1, 6–4, 6–4
Win	21–8	1969	US Amateur Championships, Boston*	Grass	(United States) Bob Lutz	9–7, 6–3, 6–1
Win	22–8	1969	Pacific Coast Championships, Berkeley* (2)	Hard (i)	(United States) Cliff Richey	6–2, 6–3
Loss	22–9	1969	Torneo di Ancona (2-man), Ancona	Hard (i)	(Romania) Ilie Năstase	4–6, 5–7
Loss	22–10	1969	Denver Invitation (2-man), Denver		(Romania) Ilie Năstase	4–6, 5–6
Win	23–10	1969	Coupe Albert Canet, Paris	Carpet (i)	(France) Jean-Baptiste Chanfreau	6–4, 6–1, 6–2
Win	24–10	1969	Hawaiian Cup Classic, Honolulu		(United States) Arthur Ashe	6–2, 6–3
Win	25–10	1970	Omaha Open, Omaha*	Carpet (i)	(United States) Jim Osborne	6–2, 7–5, 6–3
Loss	25–11	1970	Richmond WCT, Richmond	Carpet (i)	(United States) Arthur Ashe	2–6, 11–13
Win	26–11	1970	Hampton Grand Prix, Hampton*	Hard (i)	(Brazil) Thomaz Koch	6–3, 6–2, 7–5
Win	27–11	1970	Nottingham Open, Nottingham*	Grass	(United States) Chauncey Steele III	6–3, 6–4
Loss	27–12	1970	U.S. Men's Clay Court Championships, Indianapolis	Clay	(United States) Cliff Richey	2–6, 8–10, 6–3, 1–6
Win	28–12	1970	Phoenix Open, Phoenix* (3)	Hard	(United States) Jim Osborne	6–3, 6–7, 6–1
Win	29–12	1970	Stockholm Open, Stockholm*	Hard (i)	(United States) Arthur Ashe	5–7, 6–4, 6–4
Win	30–12	1970	Pepsi-Cola Masters, Tokyo*	Carpet (i)	(Australia) Rod Laver	4–6, 6–3, 6–4
Loss	30–13	1971	Carolinas International Tennis Tournament, Charlotte	Hard	(United States) Arthur Ashe	3–6, 3–6
Win	31–13	1971	City of Paris Open Championships, Paris	Clay	(France) François Jauffret	6–2, 6–4, 7–5
Win	32–13	1971	Kent Championships, Beckenham*	Grass	(India) Premjit Lall	7–9, 6–4, 6–2
Win	33–13	1971	Caribe Hilton International, San Juan*	Hard	(United States) Cliff Richey	6–3, 6–3
Win	34–13	1971	Queen's Club Championships, London*	Grass	(Australia) John Newcombe	8–6, 6–3
Loss	34–14	1971	Wimbledon Championships, London	Grass	(Australia) John Newcombe	3–6, 7–5, 6–2, 4–6, 4–6
Win	35–14	1971	Cincinnati Open, Cincinnati*	Clay	(Spain) Juan Gisbert, Sr.	7–6, 6–3
Win	36–14	1971	US Open, New York City*	Grass	(Czechoslovakia) Jan Kodeš	3–6, 6–3, 6–2, 7–6
Loss	36–15	1971	Pepsi-Cola Masters, Paris	Carpet (i)	(Romania) Ilie Năstase	7–5, 6–7, 3–6
Win	37–15	1972	U.S. National Indoor Championships, Salisbury* (2)	Hard (i)	(Romania) Ilie Năstase	5–7, 6–2, 6–3, 6–4
Win	38–15	1972	Clean Air Classic, New York City*	Carpet (i)	(Spain) Juan Gisbert, Sr.	4–6, 7–5, 6–4, 6–1
Win	39–15	1972	Hampton Grand Prix, Hampton* (2)	Hard (i)	(Romania) Ilie Năstase	6–3, 6–2, 6–7, 6–4
Win	40–15	1972	Washington Indoor, Washington*	Carpet (i)	(United States) Jimmy Connors	4–6, 6–1, 6–3, 4–6, 6–1
Win	41–15	1972	Wimbledon Championships, London*	Grass	(Romania) Ilie Năstase	4–6, 6–3, 6–3, 4–6, 7–5
Win	42–15	1972	Central California Hardcourt Championships, Sacramento*	Hard	(Australia) Colin Dibley	6–4, 5–7, 6–4, 6–4
Win	43–15	1972	Pacific Southwest Championships, Los Angeles*	Hard	(United States) Roscoe Tanner	6–4, 6–4
Win	44–15	1972	Paris Open, Paris*	Hard (i)	(Spain) Andrés Gimeno	6–2, 6–2, 7–5
Win	45–15	1972	Stockholm Open, Stockholm* (2)	Hard (i)	(Netherlands) Tom Okker	6–4, 6–3
Loss	45–16	1972	Commercial Union Assurance Masters, Barcelona	Hard (i)	(Romania) Ilie Năstase	3–6, 2–6, 6–3, 6–2, 3–6
Loss	45–17	1973	La Costa WCT, La Costa	Hard	(Australia) Colin Dibley	3–6, 6–7
Win	46–17	1973	U.S. Pro Indoor, Philadelphia*	Carpet (i)	(United States) Bob Lutz	7–6, 7–6, 4–6, 6–4
Loss	46–18	1973	CBS Classic, Hilton Head	Clay	(Australia) Rod Laver	2–6, 4–6
Win	47–18	1973	Atlanta WCT, Atlanta*	Carpet (i)	(Australia) Rod Laver	6–3, 6–4
Win	48–18	1973	St. Louis WCT, St. Louis*	Carpet (i)	(Australia) Rod Laver	6–4, 3–6, 6–4
Win	49–18	1973	Munich WCT, Munich*	Carpet (i)	(United States) Cliff Richey	6–1, 7–5
Win	50–18	1973	Brussels WCT, Brussels*	Carpet (i)	(Australia) Rod Laver	6–2, 6–4, 6–1
Win	51–18	1973	Swedish Pro Tennis Championships, Gothenburg*	Carpet (i)	(Australia) John Alexander	5–7, 6–4, 6–2
Win	52–18	1973	WCT Finals, Dallas*	Carpet (i)	(United States) Arthur Ashe	6–3, 6–3, 4–6, 6–4
Win	53–18	1973	Swedish Open, Båstad*	Clay	(Spain) Manuel Orantes	6–4, 6–2, 7–6
Loss	53–19	1973	World Invitational Tennis Classic, Hilton Head	Hard	(Australia) Rod Laver	6–7, 5–7
Loss	53–20	1973	Paris Open, Paris	Hard (i)	(Romania) Ilie Năstase	6–4, 1–6, 6–3, 0–6, 2–6
Win	54–20	1974	Hempstead WCT, Hempstead*	Carpet (i)	(Australia) John Newcombe	6–4, 3–6, 6–3
Loss	54–21	1974	La Costa WCT, La Costa	Hard	(Australia) John Newcombe	2–6, 6–4, 4–6
Win	55–21	1974	St. Louis WCT, St. Louis* (2)	Carpet (i)	(Soviet Union) Alex Metreveli	6–2, 3–6, 6–2
Win	56–21	1974	Nottingham Open, Nottingham* (2)	Grass	(Soviet Union) Alex Metreveli	6–3, 1–6, 6–3
Win	57–21	1974	Chicago International, Chicago*	Carpet	(United States) Marty Riessen	3–6, 6–1, 6–4
Loss	57–22	1975	Toronto Indoor, Toronto	Carpet (i)	(United States) Harold Solomon	4–6, 1–6
Loss	57–23	1975	San Antonio WCT, San Antonio	Hard	(United States) Dick Stockton	5–7, 6–2, 6–7
Loss	57–24	1975	Tokyo WCT, Tokyo	Carpet	(United States) Bob Lutz	4–6, 4–6
Win	58–24	1975	Australian Indoor Tennis Championships, Sydney*	Hard (i)	(United States) Bob Lutz	7–6, 6–2
Loss	58–25	1976	Memphis Open, Memphis	Hard (i)	(India) Vijay Amritraj	2–6, 6–0, 0–6
Loss	58–26	1976	Columbus Open, Columbus	Clay	(United States) Roscoe Tanner	4–6, 6–7
Loss	58–27	1977	Springfield International Tennis Classic, Springfield	Carpet (i)	(Argentina) Guillermo Vilas	6–3, 0–6, 3–6, 2–6
Loss	58–28	1977	Hampton Grand Prix, Hampton	Hard (i)	(United States) Sandy Mayer	6–4, 3–6, 2–6, 6–1, 3–6
Win	59–28	1977	Pacific Southwest Open, Los Angeles*	Carpet (i)	(United States) Brian Gottfried	6–4, 2–6, 6–3
Loss	59–29	1978	Denver Open, Denver	Carpet (i)	(United States) Jimmy Connors	2–6, 6–7
Win	60–29	1978	Atlanta Grand Prix, Atlanta*	Hard	(United States) Eliot Teltscher	4–6, 6–1, 2–1 ret.
Win	61–29	1978	Vienna Open, Vienna*	Carpet (i)	(Hungary) Balázs Taróczy	4–6, 7–6, 7–6, 6–3
Loss	61–30	1979	Hall of Fame Tennis Championships, Newport	Grass	(United States) Brian Teacher	6–1, 3–6, 4–6
Win	62–30	1979	Grand Prix Cleveland, Cleveland*	Hard	(Romania) Ilie Năstase	7–6, 7–5
Win	63–30	1979	Vienna Open, Vienna* (2)	Carpet (i)	(Poland) Wojciech Fibak	6–4, 6–0, 6–2
Win	64–30	1980	Frankfurt Grand Prix, Frankfurt*	Carpet (i)	(South Africa) Johan Kriek	2–6, 7–6, 6–2
Loss	64–31	1980	Palm Harbor Open, Palm Harbor	Hard	(Australia) Paul McNamee	4–6, 3–6

- 48 Open Era titles listed by the ATP

Source: ATP

=== Doubles: 87 (56 titles / 31 runner-ups) ===
Result	W-L	Date	Tournament	Surface	Partner	Opponents	Score
Win	1–0	Sep 1968	US Open, New York	Grass	(United States) Bob Lutz	(United States) Arthur Ashe (Spain) Andrés Gimeno	11–9, 6–1, 7–5
Loss	1–1	Jul 1969	Washington D.C., US	Clay	(United States) Bob Lutz	(Chile) Patricio Cornejo (Chile) Jaime Fillol	6–4, 1–6, 4–6
Win	2–1	Jul 1969	Cincinnati, US	Clay	(United States) Bob Lutz	(United States) Arthur Ashe (United States) Charlie Pasarell	6–3, 6–4
Win	3–1	Jan 1970	Australian Open, Melbourne	Grass	(United States) Bob Lutz	(Australia) John Alexander (Australia) Phil Dent	6–3, 8–6, 6–3
Loss	3–2	Sep 1970	Los Angeles, US	Hard	(United States) Bob Lutz	(Netherlands) Tom Okker (United States) Marty Riessen	6–7, 2–6
Win	4–2	Oct 1970	Berkeley, US	Hard	(United States) Bob Lutz	(United States) Roy Barth (United States) Tom Gorman	6–2, 7–5, 4–6, 6–2
Win	5–2	Nov 1970	Stockholm, Sweden	Carpet (i)	(United States) Arthur Ashe	(Australia) Bob Carmichael (Australia) Owen Davidson	6–0, 5–7, 7–5
Win	6–2	Dec 1970	Masters, Tokyo	Carpet	(United States) Arthur Ashe	(Czechoslovakia) Jan Kodeš (Australia) Rod Laver	round robin
Win	7–2	May 1971	Paris, France	Clay	(United States) Tom Gorman	(France) Pierre Barthès (France) François Jauffret	3–6, 7–5, 6–2
Loss	7–3	Jun 1971	French Open, Paris	Clay	(United States) Tom Gorman	(United States) Arthur Ashe (United States) Marty Riessen	6–4, 3–6, 4–6, 9–11
Loss	7–4	Jun 1971	London Queen's Club, UK	Grass	(United States) Erik van Dillen	(Netherlands) Tom Okker (United States) Marty Riessen	6–8, 6–4, 8–10
Win	8–4	Aug 1971	Cincinnati, US	Clay	(United States) Erik van Dillen	(United States) Sandy Mayer (United States) Roscoe Tanner	6–1, 3–6, 6–4
Loss	8–5	Sep 1971	US Open, New York	Grass	(United States) Erik van Dillen	(Australia) John Newcombe (United Kingdom) Roger Taylor	7–6, 3–6, 6–7, 6–4, 6–7
Win	9–5	Nov 1971	Stockholm, Sweden	Hard (i)	(United States) Tom Gorman	(United States) Arthur Ashe (United States) Bob Lutz	6–3, 6–4
Win	10–5	Apr 1972	Madrid, Spain	Clay	(Romania) Ilie Năstase	(Spain) Andrés Gimeno (Spain) Manuel Orantes	6–2, 6–2
Win	11–5	Apr 1972	Nice, France	Clay	(Czechoslovakia) Jan Kodeš	(South Africa) Frew McMillan (Romania) Ilie Năstase	6–3, 3–6, 7–5
Loss	11–6	Jul 1972	Wimbledon, London	Grass	(United States) Erik van Dillen	(South Africa) Bob Hewitt (South Africa) Frew McMillan	2–6, 2–6, 7–9
Win	12–6	Apr 1973	Brussels WCT, Belgium	Carpet (i)	(United States) Bob Lutz	(Australia) John Alexander (Australia) Phil Dent	6–4, 7–6
Win	13–6	Apr 1973	Johannesburg WCT, South Africa	Hard (i)	(United States) Bob Lutz	(South Africa) Frew McMillan (Australia) Allan Stone	6–1, 6–4, 6–4
Win	14–6	May 1973	World Doubles WCT, Montreal	Carpet (i)	(United States) Bob Lutz	(Netherlands) Tom Okker (United States) Marty Riessen	6–2, 7–6, 6–0
Win	15–6	Jul 1973	Båstad, Sweden	Clay	(Socialist Federal Republic of Yugoslavia) Nikola Pilić	(Australia) Bob Carmichael (South Africa) Frew McMillan	2–6, 6–4, 6–4
Win	16–6	Sep 1973	San Francisco, US	Carpet (i)	(Australia) Roy Emerson	(Sweden) Ove Nils Bengtson (United States) Jim McManus	6–2, 6–1
Win	17–6	Mar 1974	Atlanta WCT, US	Carpet (i)	(United States) Bob Lutz	(United States) Brian Gottfried (United States) Dick Stockton	6–3, 3–6, 7–6
Win	18–6	Apr 1974	New Orleans WCT, US	Carpet (i)	(United States) Bob Lutz	(Australia) Owen Davidson (Australia) John Newcombe	4–6, 6–4, 7–6
Loss	18–7	Jun 1974	French Open, Paris	Clay	(United States) Bob Lutz	(Australia) Dick Crealy (New Zealand) Onny Parun	3–6, 2–6, 6–3, 7–5, 1–6
Loss	18–8	Jun 1974	Nottingham, UK	Grass	(United States) Bob Lutz	(United States) Charlie Pasarell (United States) Erik van Dillen	4–6, 7–9
Loss	18–9	Jul 1974	Wimbledon, London	Grass	(United States) Bob Lutz	(Australia) John Newcombe (Australia) Tony Roche	6–8, 4–6, 4–6
Win	19–9	Aug 1974	Boston, US	Clay	(United States) Bob Lutz	(West Germany) Hans-Jürgen Pohmann (United States) Marty Riessen	3–6, 6–4, 6–3
Win	20–9	Sep 1974	US Open, New York	Grass	(United States) Bob Lutz	(Chile) Patricio Cornejo (Chile) Jaime Fillol	6–3, 6–3
Win	21–9	Sep 1974	San Francisco, US	Carpet (i)	(United States) Bob Lutz	(Australia) John Alexander (Australia) Syd Ball	6–4, 7–6
Win	22–9	Feb 1975	Fort Worth WCT, US	Hard	(United States) Bob Lutz	(Australia) John Alexander (Australia) Phil Dent	6–7, 7–6, 6–3
Win	23–9	Apr 1975	Tokyo Indoor, Japan	Carpet (i)	(United States) Bob Lutz	(Australia) John Alexander (Australia) Phil Dent	6–4, 6–7, 6–2
Win	24–9	Apr 1975	Houston, US	Carpet (i)	(United States) Bob Lutz	(United States) Mike Estep (New Zealand) Russell Simpson	7–5, 7–6
Win	25–9	Jul 1975	Washington, D.C., US	Carpet (i)	(United States) Bob Lutz	(United States) Brian Gottfried (Mexico) Raúl Ramírez	7–5, 2–6, 6–1
Win	26–9	Aug 1975	Columbus Open, US	Clay	(United States) Bob Lutz	(West Germany) Jürgen Fassbender (West Germany) Hans-Jürgen Pohmann	6–2, 6–7, 6–3
Win	27–9	Jan 1976	Indianapolis WCT, US	Carpet (i)	(United States) Bob Lutz	(United States) Vitas Gerulaitis (United States) Tom Gorman	6–2, 6–4
Win	28–9	Feb 1976	Barcelona WCT, Spain	Clay	(United States) Bob Lutz	(Poland) Wojciech Fibak (West Germany) Karl Meiler	6–3, 6–3
Win	29–9	Feb 1976	Rome WCT, Italy	Carpet (i)	(United States) Bob Lutz	(Australia) Dick Crealy (South Africa) Frew McMillan	6–7, 6–3, 6–4
Loss	29–10	May 1976	World Doubles WCT, Kansas City	Carpet (i)	(United States) Bob Lutz	(Poland) Wojciech Fibak (West Germany) Karl Meiler	2–6, 6–2, 6–3, 3–6, 4–6
Loss	29–11	May 1976	Las Vegas, US	Hard (i)	(United States) Bob Lutz	(United States) Arthur Ashe (United States) Charlie Pasarell	4–6, 2–6
Win	30–11	Jul 1976	Cincinnati Masters, US	Clay	(United States) Erik van Dillen	(United States) Eddie Dibbs (United States) Harold Solomon	6–1, 6–1
Loss	30–12	Aug 1976	Louisville, US	Clay	(United States) Erik van Dillen	(South Africa) Byron Bertram (South Africa) Pat Cramer	3–6, 4–6
Win	31–12	Sep 1976	Los Angeles, US	Hard	(United States) Bob Lutz	(United States) Arthur Ashe (United States) Charlie Pasarell	6–2, 3–6, 6–3
Win	32–12	Nov 1976	Wembley, UK	Carpet (i)	(United States) Roscoe Tanner	(Poland) Wojciech Fibak (United States) Brian Gottfried	7–6, 6–3
Loss	32–13	Nov 1976	Johannesburg, South Africa	Hard	(Spain) Juan Gisbert, Sr.	(United States) Brian Gottfried (United States) Sherwood Stewart	6–1, 1–6, 2–6, 6–7
Loss	32–14	Mar 1977	Memphis, US	Hard (i)	(United States) Bob Lutz	(United States) Fred McNair (United States) Sherwood Stewart	6–4, 6–7, 6–7
Win	33–14	Mar 1977	Hampton, US	Carpet (i)	(United States) Sandy Mayer	(Australia) Paul Kronk (Australia) Cliff Letcher	6–4, 6–3
Win	34–14	Mar 1977	Washington Indoor, US	Carpet (i)	(United States) Bob Lutz	(United States) Brian Gottfried (Mexico) Raúl Ramírez	6–3, 7–5
Loss	34–15	Apr 1977	Los Angeles PSW, US	Hard	(United States) Bob Lutz	(South Africa) Bob Hewitt (South Africa) Frew McMillan	3–6, 4–6
Win	35–15	May 1977	Las Vegas, US	Hard (i)	(United States) Bob Lutz	(South Africa) Bob Hewitt (Mexico) Raúl Ramírez	6–3, 3–6, 6–4
Win	36–15	Aug 1977	Columbus, US	Clay	(United States) Bob Lutz	(United States) Peter Fleming (United States) Gene Mayer	4–6, 7–5, 6–2
Loss	36–16	Aug 1977	Boston, US	Clay	(United States) Bob Lutz	(United States) Brian Gottfried (South Africa) Bob Hewitt	3–6, 4–6
Win	37–16	Oct 1977	Maui, US	Hard	(United States) Bob Lutz	(United States) Brian Gottfried (Mexico) Raúl Ramírez	7–6, 6–4
Win	38–16	Dec 1977	Johannesburg, South Africa	Hard	(United States) Bob Lutz	(United States) Peter Fleming (South Africa) Raymond Moore	6–3, 7–5, 6–7, 7–6
Loss	38–17	Jan 1978	Masters, New York City	Carpet	(United States) Bob Lutz	(South Africa) Bob Hewitt (South Africa) Frew McMillan	5–7, 6–7, 3–6
Win	39–17	Feb 1978	Springfield, US	Carpet (i)	(United States) Bob Lutz	(Czechoslovakia) Jan Kodeš (United States) Marty Riessen	6–3, 6–3
Win	40–17	Mar 1978	Washington Indoor, US	Carpet (i)	(United States) Bob Lutz	(United States) Arthur Ashe (United States) John McEnroe	6–7, 7–5, 6–1
Loss	40–18	Apr 1978	Rotterdam WCT, Netherlands	Carpet (i)	(United States) Bob Lutz	(United States) Fred McNair (Mexico) Raúl Ramírez	2–6, 3–6
Loss	40–19	May 1978	World Doubles WCT, US	Carpet (i)	(United States) Bob Lutz	(Poland) Wojciech Fibak (Netherlands) Tom Okker	7–6, 4–6, 0–6, 3–6
Win	41–19	Sep 1978	US Open, New York	Hard	(United States) Bob Lutz	(United States) Marty Riessen (United States) Sherwood Stewart	1–6, 7–5, 6–3
Loss	41–20	Oct 1978	San Francisco, US	Carpet (i)	(United States) Bob Lutz	(United States) Peter Fleming (United States) John McEnroe	7–5, 4–6, 4–6
Loss	41–21	Nov 1978	Stockholm, Sweden	Hard (i)	(United States) Bob Lutz	(Poland) Wojciech Fibak (Netherlands) Tom Okker	3–6, 2–6
Win	42–21	Jan 1979	Birmingham, US	Carpet (i)	(United States) Dick Stockton	(Romania) Ilie Năstase (Netherlands) Tom Okker	6–2, 6–3
Win	43–21	Feb 1979	Denver, US	Carpet (i)	(United States) Bob Lutz	(Poland) Wojciech Fibak (Netherlands) Tom Okker	7–6, 6–3
Win	44–21	Mar 1979	Washington Indoor, US	Carpet (i)	(United States) Bob Lutz	(Australia) Bob Carmichael (United States) Brian Teacher	6–4, 7–5, 3–6, 7–6
Loss	44–22	Mar 1979	New Orleans, US	Carpet	(United States) Bob Lutz	(United States) Peter Fleming (United States) John McEnroe	1–6, 3–6
Win	45–22	Jul 1979	Newport, US	Grass	(United States) Bob Lutz	(Australia) John James (Australia) Chris Kachel	6–4, 7–6
Win	46–22	Aug 1979	Cleveland, US	Hard	(United States) Bob Lutz	(Paraguay) Francisco González (United States) Fred McNair	6–3, 6–4
Loss	46–23	Aug 1979	Cincinnati, US	Hard	(United States) Bob Lutz	(United States) Brian Gottfried (Romania) Ilie Năstase	6–1, 3–6, 6–7
Loss	46–24	Sep 1979	US Open, New York	Hard	(United States) Bob Lutz	(United States) Peter Fleming (United States) John McEnroe	2–6, 4–6
Win	47–24	Nov 1979	Cologne, Germany	Carpet (i)	(United States) Gene Mayer	(Switzerland) Heinz Günthardt (Czechoslovakia) Pavel Složil	6–3, 6–4
Loss	47–25	Nov 1979	Wembley, UK	Carpet (i)	(Czechoslovakia) Tomáš Šmíd	(United States) Peter Fleming (United States) John McEnroe	2–6, 3–6
Win	48–25	Mar 1980	Rotterdam, Netherlands	Carpet (i)	(India) Vijay Amritraj	(United States) Bill Scanlon (United States) Brian Teacher	6–4, 6–3
Win	49–25	Mar 1980	Frankfurt, Germany	Carpet (i)	(India) Vijay Amritraj	(Rhodesia) Andrew Pattison (United States) Butch Walts	6–7, 6–2, 6–2
Win	50–25	Apr 1980	Las Vegas, US	Hard	(United States) Bob Lutz	(Poland) Wojciech Fibak (United States) Gene Mayer	6–2, 7–5
Loss	50–26	Jul 1980	Wimbledon, London	Grass	(United States) Bob Lutz	(Australia) Peter McNamara (Australia) Paul McNamee	6–7, 3–6, 7–6, 4–6
Win	51–26	Sep 1980	US Open, New York	Hard	(United States) Bob Lutz	(United States) Peter Fleming (United States) John McEnroe	7–6, 3–6, 6–1, 3–6, 6–3
Loss	51–27	Sep 1980	Sawgrass Doubles, US	Hard	(United States) Bob Lutz	(United States) Brian Gottfried (Mexico) Raúl Ramírez	6–7, 4–6, 6–2, 6–7
Win	52–27	Oct 1980	Vienna, Austria	Carpet (i)	(United States) Bob Lutz	(Switzerland) Heinz Günthardt (Czechoslovakia) Pavel Složil	6–1, 6–2
Loss	52–28	Nov 1980	Stockholm, Sweden	Carpet (i)	(United States) Bob Lutz	(Switzerland) Heinz Günthardt (Australia) Paul McNamee	7–6, 3–6, 2–6
Win	53–28	Dec 1980	Johannesburg, South Africa	Hard	(United States) Bob Lutz	(Switzerland) Heinz Günthardt (Australia) Paul McNamee	6–7, 6–3, 6–4
Loss	53–29	Jul 1981	Wimbledon, London	Grass	(United States) Bob Lutz	(United States) Peter Fleming (United States) John McEnroe	4–6, 4–6, 4–6
Loss	53–30	Aug 1981	Cincinnati, US	Hard	(United States) Bob Lutz	(United States) John McEnroe (United States) Ferdi Taygan	6–7, 3–6
Loss	53–31	Sep 1981	Sawgrass Doubles, US	Hard	(United States) Bob Lutz	(Switzerland) Heinz Günthardt (Australia) Peter McNamara	6–7, 6–3, 6–7, 7–5, 4–6
Win	54–31	Feb 1983	Caracas, Venezuela	Hard	(Chile) Jaime Fillol	(Ecuador) Andrés Gómez (Romania) Ilie Năstase	6–7, 6–4, 6–3
Win	55–31	Oct 1983	Vienna, Austria	Carpet (i)	(United States) Mel Purcell	(Brazil) Marcos Hocevar (Brazil) Cássio Motta	6–3, 6–4
Win	56–31	Aug 1984	Columbus, US	Hard	(United States) Sandy Mayer	(United States) Charles Bud Cox (United States) Terry Moor	6–4, 6–7, 7–5

Source: ATP

== Grand Slam performance timeline ==
Key
W	F	SF	QF	#R	RR	Q#	DNQ	A	NH

(W) winner; (F) finalist; (SF) semifinalist; (QF) quarterfinalist; (#R) rounds 4, 3, 2, 1; (RR) round-robin stage; (Q#) qualification round; (DNQ) did not qualify; (A) absent; (NH) not held; (SR) strike rate (events won / competed); (W–L) win–loss record.

=== Singles ===
Tournament	1964	1965	1966	1967	1968	1969	1970	1971	1972	1973	1974	1975	1976	1977		1978	1979	1980	1981	1982	1983	1984	1985	SR
Grand Slam tournaments
Australian Open	A	A	A	A	A	A	3R	A	A	A	A	A	3R	A	3R	A	A	A	A	A	A	A	A	0 / 3
French Open	A	A	A	A	A	4R	1R	QF	QF	4R	1R	4R	A	4R		3R	3R	A	A	A	A	A	A	0 / 10
Wimbledon	A	2R	4R	3R	2R	4R	4R	F	W	A	SF	1R	4R	4R		1R	3R	3R	4R	2R	1R	A	A	1 / 18
US Open	2R	2R	1R	3R	2R	2R	QF	W	QF	SF	QF	1R	4R	2R		3R	3R	1R	2R	2R	1R	A	A	1 / 20
Grand Slam SR	0 / 1	0 / 2	0 / 2	0 / 2	0 / 2	0 / 3	0 / 4	1 / 3	1 / 3	0 / 2	0 / 3	0 / 3	0 / 3	0 / 4		0 / 3	0 / 3	0 / 2	0 / 2	0 / 2	0 / 2	0 / 0	0 / 0	2 / 51
Year-end ranking	N/A									5	8	21	16	24		25	22	28	22	94	100	745	794	

Source: World Tennis
