= Per Jemsby =

Swedish tennis player

- Country (sports): Sweden
- Residence: Varberg, Sweden
- Born: 26 March 1948 (age 76)
- Plays: Right-handed

Singles
- Career record: 5–8
- Highest ranking: No. 255 (3 Jun 1974)

Doubles
- Career record: 1–5

Per Olof Lennert Jemsby (born 26 March 1948) is a Swedish former tennis player who was active in the late 1960s and early 1970s.

== Career ==
Jemsby's best results were at the Swedish Open in Båstad where he reached the quarter-finals on two occasions. In 1970 he lost in the quarter-final to Željko Franulović and in 1971, after beating the previous year's finalist Georges Goven in the first round and Leif Johansson in the second, he lost to Ray Ruffels. Jemsby has a career high ATP singles ranking of No. 255 that he achieved on 3 June 1974.

Between playing tennis, Jemsby also studied medicine and after qualifying as a doctor, settled in Varberg during the mid-1970s.
