= 1971 World Championship Tennis circuit =

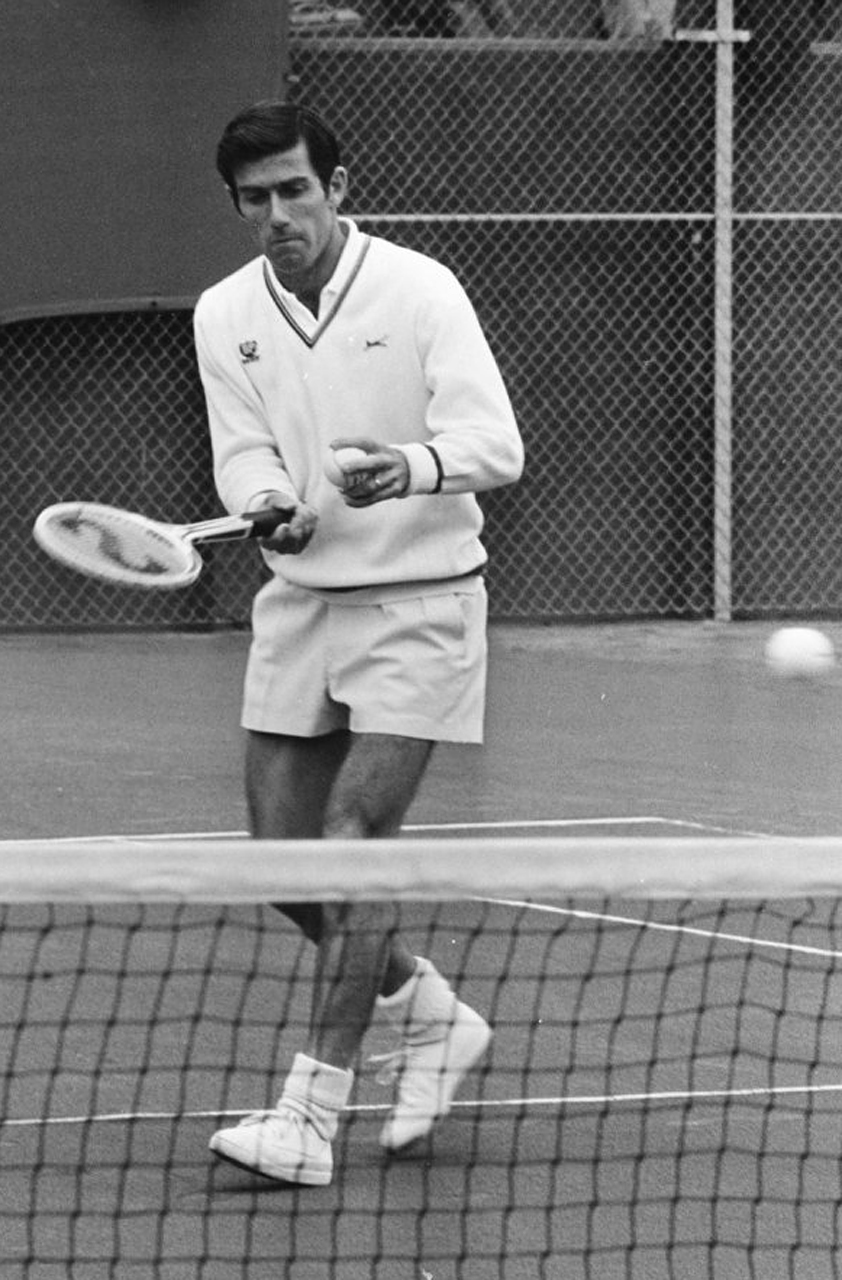
- Rosewall won five titles

Details
- Duration: 9 February 1971 – 19 November 1971
- Edition: 4th
- Tournaments: 21

Achievements (singles)
- Most titles: (Australia) Ken Rosewall (5)
- Most finals: (Australia) Rod Laver (8)
- Prize money leader: (Australia) Rod Laver ($289,841)
- Points leader: (Australia) Rod Laver (87.25)

The 1971 World Championship Tennis circuit was one of the two rival professional male tennis circuits of 1971. It was organized by World Championship Tennis (WCT) and was the first edition of the circuit. Points were awarded to players based on their tournament results (ten points for the tournament winner, seven points for the runner–up, four points for the semifinalists, two points for the quarterfinalists and one point for reaching the second round). The circuit included twenty regular events and a WCT circuit final taking place in Houston/Dallas in November for the eight players with the highest points total. Each tournament had a minimum prize money of $50,000.

== Overview ==
Week	Tournament	Location	Draw	Prize money	Surface	Champions	Runners-up
9 Feb	U.S. Pro Indoor	Philadelphia, US	32	$62,500	Carpet / indoor	(Australia) John Newcombe	(Australia) Rod Laver
7 Mar	Australian Open Championships	Sydney, Australia	64	$50,000	Grass / outdoor	(Australia) Ken Rosewall	(United States) Arthur Ashe
22 Mar	Sportface International	Chicago, US	32	$50,000	Carpet / indoor	(Australia) John Newcombe	(United States) Arthur Ashe
29 Mar	Aventura Tennis Classic	Miami, US	32	$50,000	Hard / outdoor	(South Africa) Cliff Drysdale	(Australia) Rod Laver
26 Apr	Rawlings Classic	Dallas, US	32	$50,000	Carpet / indoor	(Australia) John Newcombe	(United States) Arthur Ashe
3 May	Italian Open (Note: Tournament was also open to non-WCT players.)	Rome, Italy	48	$50,000	Clay / outdoor	(Australia) Rod Laver	(Czechoslovakia) Jan Kodeš
10 May	Aryamehr Cup	Tehran, Iran	32	$50,000	Clay / outdoor	(United States) Marty Riessen	(Australia) John Alexander
7 Jun	W.D. & H.O. Wills	Bristol, England	32	$50,000	Clay / outdoor	Unfinished (rain)	
12 Jul	Washington Star Open International (Note: Tournament was also part of the Grand Prix circuit.)	Washington, US	64	$50,000	Clay / outdoor	(Australia) Ken Rosewall	(United States) Marty Riessen
19 July	Louisville Classic	Louisville, Kentucky, US	32	$50,000	Clay / outdoor	(Netherlands) Tom Okker	(South Africa) Cliff Drysdale
26 Jul	Rothmans International	Quebec City, Canada	32	$50,000	Carpet / indoor	(Netherlands) Tom Okker	(Australia) Rod Laver
2 Aug	U.S. Professional Championships	Boston, US	32	$50,000	Hard / outdoor	(Australia) Ken Rosewall	(South Africa) Cliff Drysdale
9 Aug	Rothmans Canadian Open	Toronto, Canada	64	$50,000	Clay / outdoor	(Australia) John Newcombe	(Netherlands) Tom Okker
16 Aug	Colonial Pro Championships	Fort Worth, US	32	$50,000	Carpet / indoor	(Australia) Rod Laver	(United States) Marty Riessen
27 Sep	Redwood Bank Pacific Coast Open	Berkeley, US	64	$50,000	Hard / outdoor	(Australia) Rod Laver	(Australia) Ken Rosewall
3 Oct	Rothmans International	Vancouver, Canada	32	$50,000	Carpet / indoor	(Australia) Ken Rosewall	(Netherlands) Tom Okker
11 Oct	Profi–Tennis–Weltmeistershaft	Cologne, Germany	32	$50,000	Carpet / indoor	(United States) Bob Lutz	(United States) Jeff Borowiak
18 Oct	Spanish Open	Barcelona, Spain	32	$50,000	Clay / outdoor	(Spain) Manuel Orantes	(United States) Bob Lutz
30 Oct	Stockholm Open Indoors	Stockholm, Sweden	32	$50,000	Carpet / indoor	(United States) Arthur Ashe	(Czechoslovakia) Jan Kodeš
8 Nov	Rothmans Open	Bologna, Italy	32	$50,000	Carpet / indoor	(Australia) Rod Laver	(United States) Arthur Ashe
19 Nov	Dallas WCT Finals	Houston/Dallas, US	8	$100,000	Carpet / indoor	(Australia) Ken Rosewall	(Australia) Rod Laver

== Schedule ==
The schedule of the tournaments on the 1971 WCT circuit, with player progression documented from the quarterfinals stage onward.

=== February ===
Week	Tournament	Champions	Runners-up	Semifinalists	Quarterfinalists
9 Feb	U.S. Pro Indoor; Philadelphia, United States; Carpet (i) – $62,500 – 32S/16D; Singles	(Australia) John Newcombe; 7–6^{(7–5)}, 7–6^{(7–1)}, 6–4	(Australia) Rod Laver	(United States) Arthur Ashe (South Africa) Cliff Drysdale	(New Zealand) Brian Fairlie (United States) Dennis Ralston (Netherlands) Tom Okker (Australia) Roy Emerson

=== March ===
Week	Tournament	Champions	Runners-up	Semifinalists	Quarterfinalists
7 Mar	Australian Open; Sydney, Australia; Grand Slam; Grass – $50,000 – 64S/32D; Singles – Doubles	(Australia) Ken Rosewall; 6–1, 7–5, 6–3	(United States) Arthur Ashe	(United States) Bob Lutz (Netherlands) Tom Okker	(United Kingdom) Mark Cox (South Africa) Cliff Drysdale (United States) Marty Riessen (Australia) Roy Emerson
7 Mar	Australian Open; Sydney, Australia; Grand Slam; Grass – $50,000 – 64S/32D; Singles – Doubles	(Australia) John Newcombe (Australia) Tony Roche; 6–2, 7–6	(Netherlands) Tom Okker (United States) Marty Riessen	(United States) Bob Lutz (Netherlands) Tom Okker	(United Kingdom) Mark Cox (South Africa) Cliff Drysdale (United States) Marty Riessen (Australia) Roy Emerson
22 Mar	Sportface International; Chicago, United States; Carpet (i) – $50,000 – 32S/16D	(Australia) John Newcombe; 4–6, 7–6 6–2, 6–3	(United States) Arthur Ashe	(Netherlands) Tom Okker (Australia) Ken Rosewall	(Australia) Ray Ruffels (United States) Charlie Pasarell (South Africa) Cliff Drysdale (Spain) Andrés Gimeno
22 Mar	Sportface International; Chicago, United States; Carpet (i) – $50,000 – 32S/16D	(Netherlands) Tom Okker (United States) Marty Riessen; 7–6, 4–6, 7–6	(Australia) John Newcombe (Australia) Tony Roche	(Netherlands) Tom Okker (Australia) Ken Rosewall	(Australia) Ray Ruffels (United States) Charlie Pasarell (South Africa) Cliff Drysdale (Spain) Andrés Gimeno
29 Mar	Aventura Tennis Classic; Miami, United States; Hard – $50,000 – 32S/16D	(South Africa) Cliff Drysdale; 6–2, 6–4, 3–6, 6–4	(Australia) Rod Laver	(Australia) Tony Roche (Australia) Roy Emerson	(Socialist Federal Republic of Yugoslavia) Nikola Pilić (United States) Dennis Ralston (Netherlands) Tom Okker (Australia) John Newcombe
29 Mar	Aventura Tennis Classic; Miami, United States; Hard – $50,000 – 32S/16D	(Australia) John Newcombe (Australia) Tony Roche; 7–6, 7–6	(Australia) Roy Emerson (Australia) Rod Laver	(Australia) Tony Roche (Australia) Roy Emerson	(Socialist Federal Republic of Yugoslavia) Nikola Pilić (United States) Dennis Ralston (Netherlands) Tom Okker (Australia) John Newcombe

=== April ===
Week	Tournament	Champions	Runners-up	Semifinalists	Quarterfinalists
26 Apr	Rawlings Classic; Dallas, United States; Carpet (i) – 32S/16D	(Australia) John Newcombe; 7–6, 6–4	(United States) Arthur Ashe	(Netherlands) Tom Okker (United States) Marty Riessen	(United Kingdom) Mark Cox (South Africa) Bob Maud (South Africa) Cliff Drysdale (United States) Bob Lutz
26 Apr	Rawlings Classic; Dallas, United States; Carpet (i) – 32S/16D	(Netherlands) Tom Okker (United States) Marty Riessen; 6–3, 6–4	(United States) Bob Lutz (United States) Charlie Pasarell	(Netherlands) Tom Okker (United States) Marty Riessen	(United Kingdom) Mark Cox (South Africa) Bob Maud (South Africa) Cliff Drysdale (United States) Bob Lutz

=== May ===
Week	Tournament	Champions	Runners-up	Semifinalists	Quarterfinalists
3 May	Italian Open; Rome, Italy; Clay – 64S/32D; Singles – Doubles	(Australia) Rod Laver; 7–5, 6–3, 6–3	(Czechoslovakia) Jan Kodeš	(United States) Arthur Ashe (Netherlands) Tom Okker	(United States) Stan Smith (Australia) John Newcombe (Australia) Roy Emerson (South Africa) Cliff Drysdale
3 May	Italian Open; Rome, Italy; Clay – 64S/32D; Singles – Doubles	(Australia) John Newcombe (Australia) Tony Roche; 6–3, 6–4	(Spain) Andrés Gimeno (United Kingdom) Roger Taylor	(United States) Arthur Ashe (Netherlands) Tom Okker	(United States) Stan Smith (Australia) John Newcombe (Australia) Roy Emerson (South Africa) Cliff Drysdale
10 May	Aryamehr Cup; Teheran, Iran; Clay – $50,000 – 32S/16D	(United States) Marty Riessen; 6–7, 6–1, 6–3, 7–6	(Australia) John Alexander	(Australia) John Newcombe (United States) Arthur Ashe	(Australia) Rod Laver (Spain) Andrés Gimeno (Australia) Tony Roche (Australia) Roy Emerson
10 May	Aryamehr Cup; Teheran, Iran; Clay – $50,000 – 32S/16D	(Australia) John Newcombe (Australia) Tony Roche; 6–4, 6–7, 6–1	(Australia) Bob Carmichael (Australia) Ray Ruffels	(Australia) John Newcombe (United States) Arthur Ashe	(Australia) Rod Laver (Spain) Andrés Gimeno (Australia) Tony Roche (Australia) Roy Emerson

=== June ===
Week	Tournament	Champions	Runners-up	Semifinalists	Quarterfinalists
7 Jun	Wills Open; Bristol, England; Clay – $48,000 – 32S/16D	Tournament not completed (rain)		(United States) Arthur Ashe (South Africa) Cliff Drysdale (Australia) Rod Laver (South Africa) Bob Maud	(Australia) Ken Rosewall (Netherlands) Tom Okker (United States) Marty Riessen (Australia) Roy Emerson
7 Jun	Wills Open; Bristol, England; Clay – $48,000 – 32S/16D	Tournament not completed (rain)		(United States) Arthur Ashe (South Africa) Cliff Drysdale (Australia) Rod Laver (South Africa) Bob Maud	(Australia) Ken Rosewall (Netherlands) Tom Okker (United States) Marty Riessen (Australia) Roy Emerson

=== July ===
Week	Tournament	Champions	Runners-up	Semifinalists	Quarterfinalists
12 Jul	Washington Star International; Washington, United States; Clay – $50,000 – 64S / 32D; Singles – Doubles	(Australia) Ken Rosewall; 6–2, 7–5, 6–1	(United States) Marty Riessen	(United States) Stan Smith (Australia) John Newcombe	(United States) Dennis Ralston (Egypt) Ismail El Shafei (South Africa) Cliff Drysdale (Spain) Andrés Gimeno
12 Jul	Washington Star International; Washington, United States; Clay – $50,000 – 64S / 32D; Singles – Doubles	(Netherlands) Tom Okker (United States) Marty Riessen; 7–6, 6–2	(Australia) Bob Carmichael (Australia) Ray Ruffels	(United States) Stan Smith (Australia) John Newcombe	(United States) Dennis Ralston (Egypt) Ismail El Shafei (South Africa) Cliff Drysdale (Spain) Andrés Gimeno
19 Jul	First National Tennis Classic; Louisville, United States; Clay – $50,000 – 32S/16D	(Netherlands) Tom Okker; 3–6, 6–4, 6–1	(South Africa) Cliff Drysdale	(Socialist Federal Republic of Yugoslavia) Nikola Pilić (Australia) Ray Ruffels	(Australia) John Alexander (United States) Dennis Ralston (Australia) Roy Emerson (Egypt) Ismail El Shafei
19 Jul	First National Tennis Classic; Louisville, United States; Clay – $50,000 – 32S/16D	(Australia) Roy Emerson (Australia) Rod Laver; Not played	(Australia) Ken Rosewall (Australia) Fred Stolle	(Socialist Federal Republic of Yugoslavia) Nikola Pilić (Australia) Ray Ruffels	(Australia) John Alexander (United States) Dennis Ralston (Australia) Roy Emerson (Egypt) Ismail El Shafei
26 Jul	Rothmans International Quebec; Quebec City, Canada; Carpet (i) – 32S / 16D; Singles – Doubles	(Netherlands) Tom Okker; 6–3, 7–6, 6–7, 6–4	(Australia) Rod Laver	(United States) Bob Lutz (South Africa) Cliff Drysdale	(United States) Charlie Pasarell (Australia) Roy Emerson (United States) Arthur Ashe (Australia) Ray Ruffels
26 Jul	Rothmans International Quebec; Quebec City, Canada; Carpet (i) – 32S / 16D; Singles – Doubles	(Australia) Roy Emerson (Australia) Rod Laver; 7–6, 6–2	(Netherlands) Tom Okker (United States) Marty Riessen	(United States) Bob Lutz (South Africa) Cliff Drysdale	(United States) Charlie Pasarell (Australia) Roy Emerson (United States) Arthur Ashe (Australia) Ray Ruffels

=== August ===
Week	Tournament	Champions	Runners-up	Semifinalists	Quarterfinalists
2 Aug	U.S. Pro Tennis Championships; Boston, United States; Hard – $50,000 – 32S/16D; Singles – Doubles	(Australia) Ken Rosewall; 6–4, 6–3, 6–0	(South Africa) Cliff Drysdale	(United States) Marty Riessen (Australia) John Newcombe	(United States) Arthur Ashe (Australia) Rod Laver (Netherlands) Tom Okker (Australia) John Alexander
2 Aug	U.S. Pro Tennis Championships; Boston, United States; Hard – $50,000 – 32S/16D; Singles – Doubles	(Australia) Roy Emerson (Australia) Rod Laver; 6–4, 6–4	(Netherlands) Tom Okker (United States) Marty Riessen	(United States) Marty Riessen (Australia) John Newcombe	(United States) Arthur Ashe (Australia) Rod Laver (Netherlands) Tom Okker (Australia) John Alexander
9 Aug	Rothmans Canadian Open; Toronto, Canada; Clay – 64S/32D	(Australia) John Newcombe; 7–6, 3–6, 6–2, 7–6	(Netherlands) Tom Okker	(Australia) Ken Rosewall (Spain) Andrés Gimeno	(United Kingdom) Roger Taylor (Mexico) Marcelo Lara (South Africa) Cliff Drysdale (United States) Marty Riessen
9 Aug	Rothmans Canadian Open; Toronto, Canada; Clay – 64S/32D	(United States) Marty Riessen (Netherlands) Tom Okker; 6–3, 6–3, 6–1	(United States) Arthur Ashe (United States) Dennis Ralston	(Australia) Ken Rosewall (Spain) Andrés Gimeno	(United Kingdom) Roger Taylor (Mexico) Marcelo Lara (South Africa) Cliff Drysdale (United States) Marty Riessen
16 Aug	Colonial National Invitational; Fort Worth, United States; Hard – 32S/16D	(Australia) Rod Laver; 2–6, 6–4, 3–6, 7–5, 6–3	(United States) Marty Riessen	(Australia) Roy Emerson (South Africa) Cliff Drysdale	(United States) Charlie Pasarell (Australia) Ken Rosewall (Australia) John Alexander (United States) Dennis Ralston
16 Aug	Colonial National Invitational; Fort Worth, United States; Hard – 32S/16D	(Australia) Roy Emerson (Australia) Rod Laver; 6–4, 7–5	(Netherlands) Tom Okker (United States) Marty Riessen	(Australia) Roy Emerson (South Africa) Cliff Drysdale	(United States) Charlie Pasarell (Australia) Ken Rosewall (Australia) John Alexander (United States) Dennis Ralston

=== September ===
Week	Tournament	Champions	Runners-up	Semifinalists	Quarterfinalists
27 Sep	Redwood Bank Pacific Coast Open; Berkeley, United States; Hard – $50,000 – 64S/32D; Singles – Doubles	(Australia) Rod Laver; 6–4, 6–4, 7–6	(Australia) Ken Rosewall	(Netherlands) Tom Okker (United States) Arthur Ashe	(United States) Bob Lutz (United States) Marty Riessen (United States) Cliff Richey (South Africa) Cliff Drysdale
27 Sep	Redwood Bank Pacific Coast Open; Berkeley, United States; Hard – $50,000 – 64S/32D; Singles – Doubles	(Australia) Roy Emerson (Australia) Rod Laver; 6–3, 6–3	(Australia) Ken Rosewall (Australia) Fred Stolle	(Netherlands) Tom Okker (United States) Arthur Ashe	(United States) Bob Lutz (United States) Marty Riessen (United States) Cliff Richey (South Africa) Cliff Drysdale

=== October ===
Week	Tournament	Champions	Runners-up	Semifinalists	Quarterfinalists
3 Oct	Rothmans International Vancouver; Vancouver, Canada; Carpet (i) – $50,000 – 32S/16D; Singles – Doubles	(Australia) Ken Rosewall; 6–2, 6–2, 6–4	(Netherlands) Tom Okker	(Australia) Roy Emerson (Australia) Rod Laver	(United States) Marty Riessen (Socialist Federal Republic of Yugoslavia) Nikola Pilić (Australia) Bob Carmichael (Spain) Andrés Gimeno
3 Oct	Rothmans International Vancouver; Vancouver, Canada; Carpet (i) – $50,000 – 32S/16D; Singles – Doubles	(Australia) Roy Emerson (Australia) Rod Laver; 5–7, 6–7, 6–0, 7–5, 7–6	(Australia) John Alexander (Australia) Phil Dent	(Australia) Roy Emerson (Australia) Rod Laver	(United States) Marty Riessen (Socialist Federal Republic of Yugoslavia) Nikola Pilić (Australia) Bob Carmichael (Spain) Andrés Gimeno
11 Oct	World Professional Tennis Championship; Cologne, West Germany	(United States) Bob Lutz; 6–3, 6–7, 6–3, 6–1	(United States) Jeff Borowiak	(Netherlands) Tom Okker (South Africa) Cliff Drysdale	(Australia) Rod Laver (Spain) Andrés Gimeno (United Kingdom) Mark Cox (Australia) Ken Rosewall
11 Oct	World Professional Tennis Championship; Cologne, West Germany	(Netherlands) Tom Okker (United States) Marty Riessen; 6–7, 3–6, 7–6, 6–3, 6–4	(Australia) Roy Emerson (Australia) Rod Laver	(Netherlands) Tom Okker (South Africa) Cliff Drysdale	(Australia) Rod Laver (Spain) Andrés Gimeno (United Kingdom) Mark Cox (Australia) Ken Rosewall
18 Oct	Torneo Godó; Barcelona, Spain; Clay – $70,000 – 64S/32D	(Spain) Manuel Orantes; 6–4, 6–3, 6–4	(United States) Bob Lutz	(United States) Marty Riessen (Australia) Martin Mulligan	(Australia) Ken Rosewall (Australia) Rod Laver (Australia) John Newcombe (Australia) Fred Stolle
18 Oct	Torneo Godó; Barcelona, Spain; Clay – $70,000 – 64S/32D	(Socialist Federal Republic of Yugoslavia) Željko Franulović (Spain) Juan Gisbert; 7–6, 6–2, 7–6	(South Africa) Cliff Drysdale (Spain) Andrés Gimeno	(United States) Marty Riessen (Australia) Martin Mulligan	(Australia) Ken Rosewall (Australia) Rod Laver (Australia) John Newcombe (Australia) Fred Stolle
30 Oct	Stockholm Open; Stockholm, Sweden; Hard – $50,000 – 64S/32D; Singles – Doubles	(United States) Arthur Ashe; 6–1, 3–6, 6–2, 1–6, 6–4	(Czechoslovakia) Jan Kodeš	(Spain) Andrés Gimeno (South Africa) Cliff Drysdale	(Netherlands) Tom Okker (Australia) Rod Laver (United Kingdom) Mark Cox (Australia) John Alexander
30 Oct	Stockholm Open; Stockholm, Sweden; Hard – $50,000 – 64S/32D; Singles – Doubles	(United States) Tom Gorman (United States) Stan Smith; 6–3, 6–4	(United States) Arthur Ashe (United States) Bob Lutz	(Spain) Andrés Gimeno (South Africa) Cliff Drysdale	(Netherlands) Tom Okker (Australia) Rod Laver (United Kingdom) Mark Cox (Australia) John Alexander

=== November ===
Week	Tournament	Champions	Runners-up	Semifinalists	Quarterfinalists
8 Nov	Bologna Indoor; Bologna, Italy; Carpet (i) – $50,000 – 41S/16D; Doubles	(Australia) Rod Laver; 6–3, 6–4, 6–4	(United States) Arthur Ashe	(United States) Charlie Pasarell (Australia) Ken Rosewall	(United States) Bob Lutz (Netherlands) Tom Okker (South Africa) Cliff Drysdale (United States) Marty Riessen
8 Nov	Bologna Indoor; Bologna, Italy; Carpet (i) – $50,000 – 41S/16D; Doubles	(Australia) Ken Rosewall (Australia) Fred Stolle; 6–7, 6–2, 6–3, 6–3	(South Africa) Robert Maud (South Africa) Frew McMillan	(United States) Charlie Pasarell (Australia) Ken Rosewall	(United States) Bob Lutz (Netherlands) Tom Okker (South Africa) Cliff Drysdale (United States) Marty Riessen
19 Nov	WCT Finals; Dallas, United States; Carpet (i) – $100,000 – 8S; Singles	(Australia) Ken Rosewall; 6–4, 1–6, 7–6^{(7–3)}, 7–6^{(7–4)}	(Australia) Rod Laver	(Netherlands) Tom Okker (United States) Arthur Ashe	(Australia) John Newcombe (United States) Bob Lutz (South Africa) Cliff Drysdale (United States) Marty Riessen

== Standings ==
Key

Qualified for Tour Finals

Rk	Name	Country	Tournaments played	Tournaments won	Matches won	Matches lost	Points	Prize money (USD)
1	Rod Laver	AUS	19	4	54	14	87.25	289,841
2	Tom Okker	NED	20	2	52	17	75	120,564
3	Ken Rosewall	AUS	18	4	51	14	74	137,687
4	Cliff Drysdale	RSA	20	1	52	18	69.25	69,078
5	Arthur Ashe	USA	20	1	43	18	68.25	99,746
6	John Newcombe	AUS	12	4	36	8	60	97,764
7	Marty Riessen	USA	20	1	41	19	55	76,069
8	Bob Lutz	USA	20	1	31	19	41	58,392
9	Roy Emerson	AUS	19	–	31	18	34	46,052
10	Andrés Gimeno	ESP	18	–	29	18	30	34,512

_{Source: World of Tennis '72}

== See also ==
- 1971 Grand Prix circuit
- Association of Tennis Professionals
- International Tennis Federation
