= 1971 U.S. Pro Tennis Championships – Doubles =

Doubles
- 1971 U.S. Pro Tennis Championships

Final
- Champion: (Australia) Roy Emerson (Australia) Rod Laver
- Runner-up: (Netherlands) Tom Okker (United States) Marty Riessen
- Score: 6–4, 6–4

Events
Singles	Doubles
← 1970 ·	U.S. Pro Tennis Championships	· 1972 →

The 1971 U.S. Pro Tennis Championships was a men's tennis tournament played on outdoor hard courts at the Longwood Cricket Club in Boston, USA and was part of the 1971 World Championship Tennis circuit. It was the 44th edition of the tournament and was held from August 2 through August 8, 1971. Sixth-seeded Ken Rosewall won the singles title, his third U.S. Pro title, and the accompanying $10,000 first-prize money. The final was watched by 5,500 spectators.

== Seeds ==
Champion seeds are indicated in bold text while text in italics indicates the round in which those seeds were eliminated.

1. (Netherlands) Tom Okker / (United States) Marty Riessen (final)
2. (Australia) **Roy Emerson** / (Australia) **Rod Laver (champions)**
3. (Australia) Bob Carmichael / (Australia) Ray Ruffels (first round)
4. (Australia) Ken Rosewall / (Australia) Fred Stolle (first round)
5. (Australia) Bill Bowrey / (Australia) Owen Davidson (first round)
6. (Australia) John Alexander / (Australia) Phil Dent (semifinals)

== Draw ==
=== Key ===
- Q = Qualifier
- WC = Wild card
- LL = Lucky loser
- Alt = Alternate
- SE = Special exempt
- PR = Protected ranking
- ITF = ITF entry
- JE = Junior exempt
- w/o = Walkover
- r = Retired
- d = Defaulted
- SR = Special ranking

=== Finals ===
First round
2	(Australia) **R Emerson** **(Australia) R Laver**	**6**	**7**
(United States) R Holmberg (United States) C Pasarell	4	5
(United States) **A Ashe** **(United States) B Lutz**	**6**	**6**
(United States) R Barth (Denmark) T Ulrich	1	3
(Spain) **A Gimeno** **(United Kingdom) R Taylor**	**7**	**6**
5	(Australia) W Bowrey (Australia) O Davidson	6	4
(South Africa) **F McMillan** **(Australia) J Newcombe**	**7**	**6**
3	(Australia) B Carmichael (Australia) R Ruffels	5	4
(South Africa) **C Drysdale** **(Kingdom of Yugoslavia) N Pilić**	**6**	**6**
4	(Australia) K Rosewall (Australia) F Stolle	4	3
6	(Australia) **J Alexander** **(Australia) P Dent**	**6**	**6**
(Australia) D Crealy (United States) T Leonard	3	0
(United Kingdom) **M Cox** **(United Kingdom) G Stilwell**	**6**	**7**
(Egypt) I El Shafei (New Zealand) B Fairlie	4	5
1	(Netherlands) **T Okker** **(United States) M Riessen**	**6**	3	**6**
(South Africa) B Maud (Australia) A Stone	4	**6**	4

Quarterfinals
2	(Australia) **R Emerson** **(Australia) R Laver**	**7**	3	**6**
(United States) A Ashe (United States) B Lutz	6	**6**	3
(Spain) **A Gimeno** **(United Kingdom) R Taylor**	4	**7**	**6**
(South Africa) F McMillan (Australia) J Newcombe	**6**	5	3
(South Africa) C Drysdale (Kingdom of Yugoslavia) N Pilić	6	**6**	6
6	(Australia) **J Alexander** **(Australia) P Dent**	**7**	3	**7**
(United Kingdom) M Cox (United Kingdom) G Stilwell	3	2
1	(Netherlands) **T Okker** **(United States) M Riessen**	**6**	**6**

Semifinals
2	(Australia) **R Emerson** **(Australia) R Laver**	**6**	**7**
(Spain) A Gimeno (United Kingdom) R Taylor	3	5
6	(Australia) J Alexander (Australia) P Dent	**6**	0	3
1	(Netherlands) **T Okker** **(United States) M Riessen**	1	**6**	**6**

Final
2	(Australia) **R Emerson** **(Australia) R Laver**	**6**	**6**
1	(Netherlands) T Okker (United States) M Riessen	4	4
