= 1971 U.S. Pro Tennis Championships – Singles =

Singles
- 1971 U.S. Pro Tennis Championships

Final
- Champion: (Australia) Ken Rosewall
- Runner-up: (South Africa) Cliff Drysdale
- Score: 6–4, 6–3, 6–0

Details
- Draw: 32
- Seeds: 12

Events
Singles	Doubles
← 1970 ·	U.S. Pro Tennis Championships	· 1972 →

The 1971 U.S. Pro Tennis Championships was a men's tennis tournament played on outdoor hard courts at the Longwood Cricket Club in Boston, USA and was part of the 1971 World Championship Tennis circuit. It was the 44th edition of the tournament and was held from August 2 through August 8, 1971. Tony Roche was the defending champion but did not participate in this edition. Sixth-seeded Ken Rosewall won the singles title, his third U.S. Pro title, and the accompanying $10,000 first-prize money. The final was watched by 5,500 spectators.

== Seeds ==
Champion seeds are indicated in bold text while text in italics indicates the round in which those seeds were eliminated.

1. (Australia) John Newcombe (semifinals)
2. (United States) Arthur Ashe (quarterfinals)
3. (South Africa) Cliff Drysdale (final)
4. (Australia) Rod Laver (quarterfinals)
5. (Netherlands) Tom Okker (quarterfinals)
6. (Australia) **Ken Rosewall (champion)**
7. (United States) Marty Riessen (semifinals)
8. (Australia) Roy Emerson (second round)
9. (Spain) Andrés Gimeno (second round)
10. (South Africa) Bob Maud (first round)
11. (Australia) John Alexander (quarterfinals)
12. (United States) Bob Lutz (second round)

== Draw ==
=== Key ===
- Q = Qualifier
- WC = Wild card
- LL = Lucky loser
- Alt = Alternate
- SE = Special exempt
- PR = Protected ranking
- ITF = ITF entry
- JE = Junior exempt
- w/o = Walkover
- r = Retired
- d = Defaulted
- SR = Special ranking

=== Finals ===
Semifinals
6	**(Australia) Ken Rosewall**	3	**6**	**6**	**6**
7	(United States) Marty Riessen	**6**	1	4	3
3	**(South Africa) Cliff Drysdale**	**6**	1	5	**7**	**6**
1	(Australia) John Newcombe	3	**6**	**7**	5	4

Final
6	**(Australia) Ken Rosewall**	**6**	**6**	**6**
3	(South Africa) Cliff Drysdale	4	3	0

=== Top half ===
Second round
2	**(United States) A Ashe**	**6**	**6**
(Kingdom of Yugoslavia) N Pilić	4	3
**(United States) C Pasarell**	**6**	**6**
(Australia) W Bowrey	0	3
9	**(Spain) A Gimeno**	**6**	**6**
(Denmark) T Ulrich	1	1
6	**(Australia) K Rosewall**	**6**	**6**
(United Kingdom) M Cox	3	3

Quarterfinals
2	**(United States) A Ashe**	**6**	**6**
(United States) C Pasarell	4	0
9	(Spain) A Gimeno	6	4
6	**(Australia) K Rosewall**	**7**	**6**

Semifinals
2	(United States) A Ashe	3	4
6	**(Australia) K Rosewall**	**6**	**6**
Semifinals
6	**(United States) M Riessen**	1	**6**	**6**	**6**
7	(Australia) R Laver	**6**	4	6	3

=== Bottom half ===
Second round
3	**(South Africa) C Drysdale**	**6**	**7**
(Australia) R Ruffels	1	6
**(United Kingdom) R Taylor**	**6**	**6**
(United States) R Barth	2	2
**(Australia) A Stone**	**6**	**7**
10	(South Africa) B Maud	1	6
5	**(Netherlands) T Okker**	3	**7**	**6**
(New Zealand) B Fairlie	**6**	6	1

Quarterfinals
3	**(South Africa) C Drysdale**	**7**	**7**
(United Kingdom) R Taylor	5	5
(Australia) A Stone	4	1
5	**(Netherlands) T Okker**	**6**	**6**

Semifinals
3	**(South Africa) C Drysdale**	**6**	4	**6**
5	(Netherlands) T Okker	4	**6**	4
Semifinals
3	(Australia) J Alexander	5	4	5	**7**	**6**
1	**(Australia) J Newcombe**	**7**	**6**	5	4
