= Ken Rosewall career statistics =

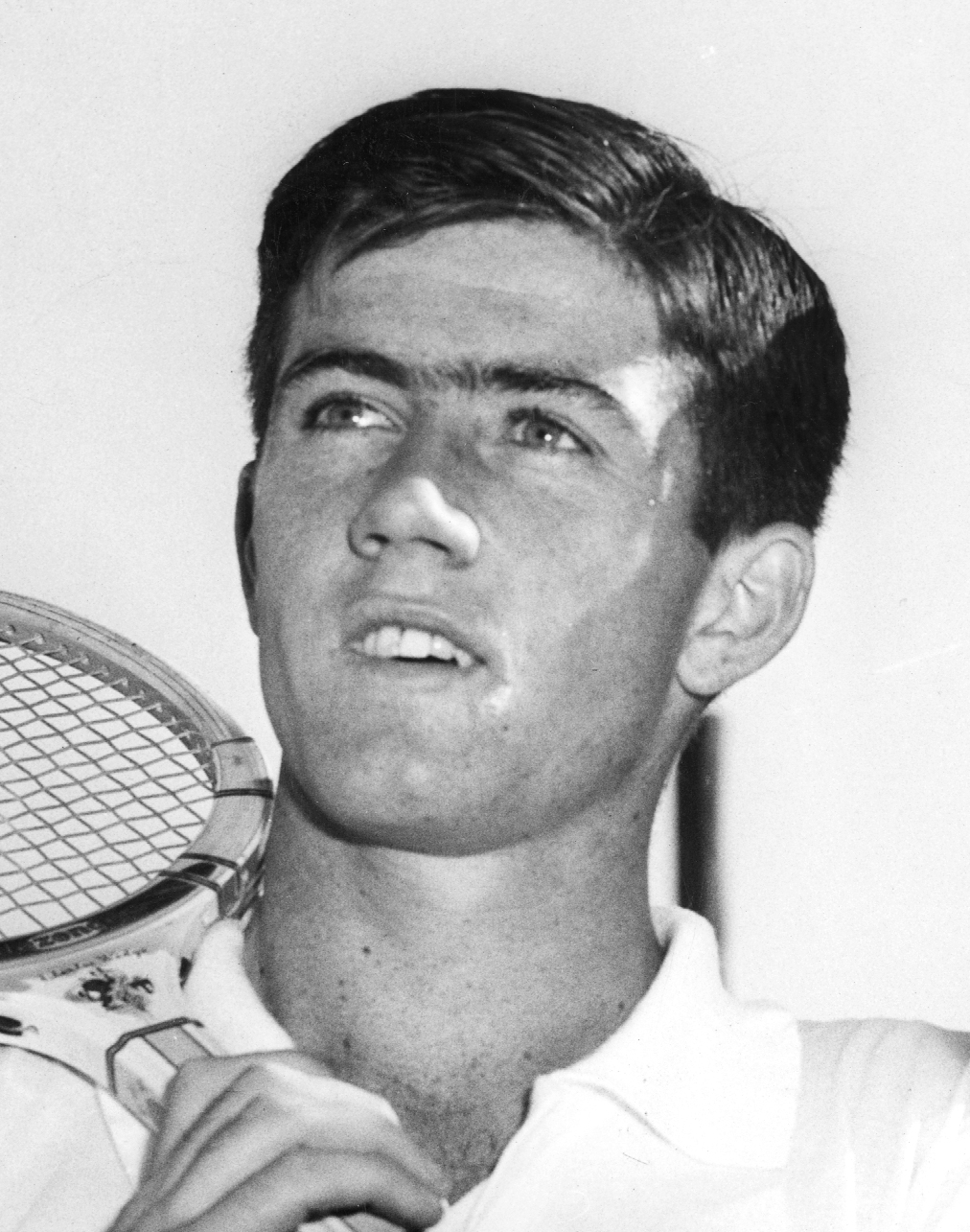
Australian tennis player Ken Rosewall ca. 1954

This is a list of the main career statistics of Australian former tennis player Ken Rosewall whose playing career ran from 1951 until 1980. He played as an amateur from 1951 until the end of 1956 when he joined Jack Kramer's professional circuit. As a professional he was banned from playing the Grand Slam tournaments as well as other tournaments organized by the national associations of the International Lawn Tennis Federation (ILTF). In 1968, with the advent of the Open Era, the distinction between amateurs and professionals disappeared and Rosewall was again able to compete in most (Note: Power struggles between the ILTF and the commercial promoters National Tennis League (NTL) and World Championship Tennis (WCT) resulted in Rosewall missing a number of Grand Slam tournaments during the early 1970s.) Grand Slam events until the end of his career in 1978. During his career he won eight Grand Slam, 15 Pro Slam and three Davis Cup titles.

== Major finals ==
=== Grand Slam finals ===
==== Singles: 16 finals (8 titles, 8 runner-ups) ====
Result	Year	Championship	Surface	Opponent	Score
Win	1953	Australian Championships	Grass	(Australia) Mervyn Rose	6–0, 6–3, 6–4
Win	1953	French Championships	Clay	(United States) Vic Seixas	6–3, 6–4, 1–6, 6–2
Loss	1954	Wimbledon	Grass	(Egypt) Jaroslav Drobný	11–13, 6–4, 2–6, 7–9
Win	1955	Australian Championships	Grass	(Australia) Lew Hoad	9–7, 6–4, 6–4
Loss	1955	U.S. Championships	Grass	(United States) Tony Trabert	7–9, 3–6, 3–6
Loss	1956	Australian Championships	Grass	(Australia) Lew Hoad	4–6, 6–3, 4–6, 5–7
Loss	1956	Wimbledon	Grass	(Australia) Lew Hoad	2–6, 6–4, 5–7, 4–6
Win	1956	U.S. Championships	Grass	(Australia) Lew Hoad	4–6, 6–2, 6–3, 6–3
↓ Open Era ↓
Win	1968	French Open	Clay	(Australia) Rod Laver	6–3, 6–1, 2–6, 6–2
Loss	1969	French Open	Clay	(Australia) Rod Laver	4–6, 3–6, 4–6
Loss	1970	Wimbledon	Grass	(Australia) John Newcombe	7–5, 3–6, 2–6, 6–3, 1–6
Win	1970	US Open	Grass	(Australia) Tony Roche	2–6, 6–4, 7–6^{(5–2)}, 6–3
Win	1971	Australian Open	Grass	(United States) Arthur Ashe	6–1, 7–5, 6–3
Win	1972	Australian Open	Grass	(Australia) Malcolm Anderson	7–6^{(7–2)}, 6–3, 7–5
Loss	1974	Wimbledon	Grass	(United States) Jimmy Connors	1–6, 1–6, 4–6
Loss	1974	US Open	Grass	(United States) Jimmy Connors	1–6, 0–6, 1–6

==== Doubles: 17 finals (9 titles, 8 runner-ups) ====
Result	Year	Championship	Surface	Partner	Opponents	Score
Win	1953	Australian Championships	Grass	(Australia) Lew Hoad	(Australia) Don Candy (Australia) Mervyn Rose	9–11, 6–4, 10–8, 6–4
Win	1953	French Championships	Clay	(Australia) Lew Hoad	(Australia) Mervyn Rose (Australia) Clive Wilderspin	6–2, 6–1, 6–1
Win	1953	Wimbledon	Grass	(Australia) Lew Hoad	(Australia) Rex Hartwig (Australia) Mervyn Rose	6–4, 7–5, 4–6, 7–5
Loss	1954	French Championships	Clay	(Australia) Lew Hoad	(United States) Vic Seixas (United States) Tony Trabert	4–6, 2–6, 1–6
Loss	1954	Wimbledon	Grass	(Australia) Neale Fraser	(Australia) Rex Hartwig (Australia) Lew Hoad	5–7, 4–6, 3–6
Loss	1954	U.S. National Championships	Grass	(Australia) Lew Hoad	(United States) Vic Seixas (United States) Tony Trabert	6–3, 4–6, 6–8, 3–6
Loss	1955	Australian Championships	Grass	(Australia) Lew Hoad	(United States) Vic Seixas (United States) Tony Trabert	3–6, 2–6, 6–2, 6–3, 1–6
Win	1956	Australian Championships	Grass	(Australia) Lew Hoad	(Australia) Don Candy (Australia) Mervyn Rose	10–8, 13–11, 6–4
Win	1956	Wimbledon	Grass	(Australia) Lew Hoad	(Italy) Orlando Sirola (Italy) Nicola Pietrangeli	7–5, 6–2, 6–1
Win	1956	U.S. National Championships	Grass	(Australia) Lew Hoad	(United States) Hamilton Richardson (United States) Vic Seixas	6–2, 6–2, 3–6, 6–4
↓ Open Era ↓
Win	1968	French Open	Clay	(Australia) Fred Stolle	(Australia) Roy Emerson (Australia) Rod Laver	6–3, 6–4, 6–3
Loss	1968	Wimbledon	Grass	(Australia) Fred Stolle	(Australia) John Newcombe (Australia) Tony Roche	6–3, 6–8, 7–5, 12–14, 3–6
Loss	1969	Australian Open	Grass	(Australia) Fred Stolle	(Australia) Rod Laver (Australia) Roy Emerson	4–6, 4–6
Win	1969	US Open	Grass	(Australia) Fred Stolle	(United States) Charles Pasarell (United States) Dennis Ralston	2–6, 7–5, 13–11, 6–3
Loss	1970	Wimbledon	Grass	(Australia) Fred Stolle	(Australia) John Newcombe (Australia) Tony Roche	8–10, 3–6, 1–6
Win	1972	Australian Open	Grass	(Australia) Owen Davidson	(Australia) Ross Case (Australia) Geoff Masters	3–6, 7–6, 6–3
Loss	1973	US Open	Grass	(Australia) Rod Laver	(Australia) Owen Davidson (Australia) John Newcombe	5–7, 6–2, 5–7, 5–7

=== Pro Slam finals ===
==== Singles * : 15 titles, 4 runner-ups ====
Result	Year	Championship	Surface	Opponent	Score
Win	1957	Wembley Championship	Indoor	(Ecuador) Pancho Segura	1–6, 6–3, 6–4, 3–6, 6–4
Win	1958	French Pro Championship	Clay	(Australia) Lew Hoad	3–6, 6–2, 6–4, 6–0
Win	1960	French Pro Championship	Clay	(Australia) Lew Hoad	6–2, 2–6, 6–2, 6–1
Win	1960	Wembley Championship	Indoor	(Ecuador) Pancho Segura	5–7, 8–6, 6–1, 6–3
Win	1961	French Pro Championship	Clay	(United States) Pancho Gonzales	2–6, 6–4, 6–3, 8–6
Win	1961	Wembley Championship	Indoor	(Australia) Lew Hoad	6–3, 3–6, 6–2, 6–3
Win	1962	French Pro Championship	Clay	(Spain) Andrés Gimeno	3–6, 6–2, 7–5, 6–2
Win	1962	Wembley Championship	Indoor	(Australia) Lew Hoad	6–4, 5–7, 15–13, 7–5
Win	1963	U.S. Pro Championship	Grass	(Australia) Rod Laver	6–4, 6–2, 6–2
Win	1963	French Pro Championship	Wood (i)	(Australia) Rod Laver	6–8, 6–4, 5–7, 6–3, 6–4
Win	1963	Wembley Championship	Indoor	(Australia) Lew Hoad	6–4, 6–2, 4–6, 6–3
Win	1964	French Pro Championship	Wood (i)	(Australia) Rod Laver	6–3, 7–5, 3–6, 6–3
Loss	1964	Wembley Championship	Indoor	(Australia) Rod Laver	5–7, 6–4, 7–5, 6–8, 6–8
Win	1965	U.S. Pro Championship	Grass	(Australia) Rod Laver	6–4, 6–3, 6–3
Win	1965	French Pro Championship	Wood (i)	(Australia) Rod Laver	6–3, 6–2, 6–4
Win	1966	French Pro Championship	Wood (i)	(Australia) Rod Laver	6–3, 6–2, 14–12
Loss	1966	Wembley Championship	Indoor	(Australia) Rod Laver	2–6, 2–6, 3–6
Loss	1966	U.S. Pro Championship	Grass	(Australia) Rod Laver	4–6, 6–4, 2–6, 10–8, 3–6
Loss	1967	Wembley Championship	Indoor	(Australia) Rod Laver	6–2, 1–6, 6–1, 6–8, 2–6

- * other events (important professional tournaments – 2 runners-up)

== WCT year end championship ==
=== Singles: 2 titles ===
Result	Year	Tournament	Surface	Opponent	Score
Win	1971	Dallas, U.S.	Carpet	(Australia) Rod Laver	6–4, 1–6, 7–6^{(7–3)}, 7–6^{(7–4)}
Win	1972	Dallas, U.S.	Carpet (i)	(Australia) Rod Laver	4–6, 6–0, 6–3, 6–7^{(3–7)}, 7–6^{(7–5)}

== Performance timeline ==
Key
W	F	SF	QF	#R	RR	Q#	DNQ	A	NH

(W) winner; (F) finalist; (SF) semifinalist; (QF) quarterfinalist; (#R) rounds 4, 3, 2, 1; (RR) round-robin stage; (Q#) qualification round; (DNQ) did not qualify; (A) absent; (NH) not held; (SR) strike rate (events won / competed); (W–L) win–loss record.

Ken Rosewall joined professional tennis in 1957 and was unable to compete in 45 Grand Slam tournaments until the open era arrives in 1968. Summarizing Grand Slam and Pro Slam tournaments, Rosewall won 23 titles, he has a winning record of 242–46 which represents 84.02% spanning 28 years.

Grand Slam Tournament	Amateur						Professional	Open Era												Titles / played	Career win–loss	Career win %
Grand Slam Tournament	'51	'52	'53	'54	'55	'56	1957–1967	'68	'69	'70	'71	'72	'73	'74	'75	'76	'77		'78	Titles / played	Career win–loss	Career win %
Australian	1R	QF	W	SF	W	F	A		3R	A	W	W	2R	A	A	SF	SF	QF	3R	4 / 14	43–10	81.13
French	A	2R	W	4R	A	A	A	W	F	A	A	A	A	A	A	A	A		A	2 / 5	24–3	88.89
Wimbledon	A	2R	QF	F	SF	F	A	4R	3R	F	SF	A	A	F	4R	A	A		A	0 / 11	47–11	81.03
U.S.	A	QF	SF	SF	F	W	A	SF	QF	W	A	2R	SF	F	A	A	3R		A	2 / 12	57–10	85.07
Total:																				8 / 42	171–34	83.41

Pro Slam Tournament	Professional											Titles / played	Career win–loss	Career win %
Pro Slam Tournament	'57	'58	'59	'60	'61	'62	'63	'64	'65	'66	'67			
U.S. Pro	SF	A	A	A	A	A	W	SF	W	F	SF	2 / 6	12–4	75.00
French Pro	NH	W	SF	W	W	W	W	W	W	W	SF	8 / 10	30–2	93.75
Wembley Pro	W	SF	SF	W	W	W	W	F	SF	F	F	5 / 11	29–6	82.86
Total:												15 / 27	71–12	85.54
other Pro
Tournament of Champions	SF	F	SF	NH	NH	NH	NH	NH	NH	NH	NH	0 / 3	—	—
Wimbledon Pro	NH	NH	NH	NH	NH	NH	NH	NH	NH	NH	F	0 / 1	2–1	66.67

== Career finals ==
=== Singles ===
	Amateur (24)						Professional (80)												Open Era (43)										Total
	'51	'52	'53	'54	'55	'56	'57	'58	'59	'60	'61	'62	'63	'64	'65	'66	'67	'68	'68	'69	'70	'71	'72	'73	'74	'75	'76	'77	Total
Titles	1	0	4	3	5	11	5	6	5	7	6	10	9	11	7	9	8	1	4	3	6	8	7	5	0	3	2	1	147
Runner-ups																													104

Legend
Grand Slam tournament
WCT Final

==== Amateur era (26 titles) ====
Period: 1951–1956

No.	Date	Championship	Surface	Opponent	Score
1	Jan 1951	Sydney Seaside Championships (Australia)	Grass	(Australia) James Gilchrist	6–1, 6–4
2	Jan 1953	Australian Championships, Melbourne (Australia)	Grass	(Australia) Mervyn Rose	6–0, 6–3, 6–4
3	Apr 1953	Perth Western Australian Championships (Australia)	Grass	(Australia) Don Candy	6–3, 6–4, 6–2
4	May 1953	French Championships, Paris (France)	Clay	(United States) Vic Seixas	6–3, 6–4, 1–6, 6–2
5	Oct 1953	Los Angeles Pacific Southwest (United States)	Hard	(United States) Vic Seixas	6–4, 1–6, 3–6, 6–1, 6–4
6	Apr 1954	Toowoomba Darling Downs (Australia)	Grass	(Australia) Mal Anderson	6–4, 6–2
7	Jun 1954	Manchester Northern Tournament (United Kingdom)	Grass	(Australia) Rex Hartwig	6–2, 6–1
8	Oct 1954	Toowoomba Championships (Australia)	Grass	(Australia) Malcolm Anderson	6–4 (last set)
9	Dec 1954	Melbourne Victorian Championships (Australia)	Grass	(United States) Vic Seixas	6–1, 4–6, 6–1, 7–5
10	Jan 1955	Sydney Seaside Championships (Australia)	Grass	(Australia) Mal Anderson	6–1, 6–4
11	Jan 1955	Australian Championships, Adelaide (Australia)	Grass	(Australia) Lew Hoad	9–7, 6–4, 6–4
12	Apr 1955	Launceston Tasmanian Hard Court (Tasmania)	Clay	(Australia) Neale Fraser	6–3, 5–7, 6–4, 2–6, 6–1
13	Jun 1955	Queen's Club Championships, London (United Kingdom)	Grass	(Australia) Lew Hoad	6–2, 6–3
14	Oct 1955	Brisbane Queensland Championships (Australia)	Grass	(Australia) Ashley Cooper	6–8, 6–4, 6–4, 6–4
15	Jan 1956	Sydney County of Cumberland (Australia)	Grass	(Australia) Paul Frankland	6–2, 6–4
16	Mar 1956	Wagga Wagga New South Wales Hard Court (Australia)	Clay	(Australia) Neale Fraser	6–2, 6–4
17	Apr 1956	Toowoomba Darling Downs (Australia)	Grass	(Australia) P. Gaydon	6–1, 6–4
18	Jul 1956	Båstad Swedish Championships (Sweden)	Clay	(Denmark) Kurt Nielsen	7–5, 6–3, 6–1
19	Jul 1956	Oskarshamn International (Sweden)	?	(Australia) Neale Fraser	?
20	Jul 1956	Travemünde International (Germany)	Clay	(Hungary) Ladislas Legenstein	8–6, 3–6, 6–0
21	Jul 1956	Deauville Colonel Kuntz Cup (France)	Clay	(France) Marcel Bernard	6–1, 6–3, 11–9
22	Aug 1956	Newport Casino Invitational (United States)	Grass	(United States) Hamilton Richardson	6–0, 8–6, 6–2
23	Oct 1956	U.S. Championships, Forest Hills (United States)	Grass	(Australia) Lew Hoad	4–6, 6–2, 6–3, 6–3
24	Oct 1956	Sydney New South Wales Championships (Australia)	Grass	(Australia) Neale Fraser	6–4, 7–5, 6–4
25	Dec 1956	Adelaide South Australian Championships (Australia)	Grass	(Australia) Lew Hoad	6–1, 7–5, 6–1
26	Dec 1956	Melbourne Victorian Championships (Australia)	Grass	(Australia) Lew Hoad	5–7, 7–5, 6–2, 4–6, 6–4

==== Professional era (64 titles) ====
Period: 1957–1968

No.	Date	Championship	Surface	Opponent	Score
1	Sep 1957	Wembley Championships, London (United Kingdom)	Wood (i)	(Ecuador) Pancho Segura	1–6, 6–3, 6–4, 3–6, 6–4
2	Aug 1958	Eastbourne Slazenger Pro (United Kingdom)	Grass	(United States) Tony Trabert	6–0, 6–2, 6–8, 2–6, 7–5
3	Sep 1958	French Pro Championship, Paris (France)	Clay	(Australia) Lew Hoad	3–6, 6–2, 6–4, 6–0
4	Nov 1958	Madrid Indoor Pro (Spain)^{1}	Hard (i)	(United States) Tony Trabert	6–3, 2–6, 10–8
5	Jan 1959	Brisbane Pro Championships (Australia)	Grass	(United States) Tony Trabert	6–2, 4–6, 3–6, 7–5, 6–1
6	Aug 1959	Palermo Pro Championships (Italy)^{1}	Clay	(Australia) Frank Sedgman	6–3, 6–1
7	Dec 1959	Brisbane Pro Championships (Australia)	Grass	(United States) Pancho Gonzales	1–6, 7–5, 8–6, 8–6
8	May 1960	Melbourne Australian Pro Indoor (Australia)	Clay (i)	(Australia) Lew Hoad	6–3, 9–11, 8–10, 7–5, 6–3
9	Jun 1960	San Francisco Pro (United States)	Hard	(Australia) Lew Hoad	7–5, 7–5
10	Jun 1960	Los Angeles Pro (United States)	Hard	(Australia) Lew Hoad	10–12, 6–3, 6–4
11	Sep 1960	French Pro Championship, Paris (France)	Clay	(Australia) Lew Hoad	6–2, 2–6, 6–2, 6–1
12	Sep 1960	Wembley Championships, (London) (United Kingdom)	Wood (i)	(Ecuador) Pancho Segura	5–7, 8–6, 6–1, 6–3
13	Nov 1960	Manille Jack Kramer Pro (Philippines)	Clay	(Spain) Andrés Gimeno	6–3, 6–4
14	Sep 1961	French Pro Championship, Paris (France)	Clay	(United States) Pancho Gonzales	2–6, 6–4, 6–3, 8–6
15	Sep 1961	Wembley Championships, London (United Kingdom)	Wood (i)	(Australia) Lew Hoad	6–3, 3–6, 6–2, 6–3
16	Dec 1961	Sydney New South Wales Pro (Australia)	Grass	(United States) Butch Buchholz	6–4, 6–3, 6–1
17	Jan 1962	Adelaide South Australian Pro (Australia)	Grass	(Spain) Andrés Gimeno	7–9, 6–3, 12–10, 6–4
18	Jan 1962	Melbourne Victorian Pro (Australia)	Grass	(Australia) Lew Hoad	6–3, 6–8, 6–0, 6–4
19	Feb 1962	Sydney Australian TV Series (Australia)^{2}	Grass		
20	Mar 1962	Wellington Pro (New Zealand)^{1}	Grass	(Spain) Andrés Gimeno	4–6, 6–2, 6–1
21	Apr 1962	Auckland Pro (New Zealand)^{1}	Grass	(Spain) Andrés Gimeno	6–3, 6–2
22	Sep 1962	Genova Gold Trophy Pro (Switzerland)	Clay	(Australia) Lew Hoad	6–3, 7–5
23	Sep 1962	French Pro Championship, Paris (France)	Clay	(Spain) Andrés Gimeno	3–6, 6–2, 7–5, 6–2
24	Sep 1962	Wembley Championships, London (United Kingdom)	Wood (i)	(Australia) Lew Hoad	6–4, 5–7, 15–13, 7–5
25	Sepr 1962	Milan Pro Championships (Italy)	Hard	(Spain) Andrés Gimeno	6–3, 6–2, 6–2
26	Oct 1962	Stockholm Swedish Pro (Sweden)	Hard (i)	(Spain) Andrés Gimeno	3–6, 6–2, 7–5
27	Jun 1963	Los Angeles Adler Pro (United States)	Hard	(Australia) Rod Laver	14–12, 6–4, 6–3
28	Jun 1963	U.S. Pro Championship, Forest Hills (United States)	Grass	(Australia) Rod Laver	6–4, 6–2, 6–2
29	Sep 1963	French Pro Championship, Paris (France)	Wood	(Australia) Rod Laver	6–8, 6–4, 5–7, 6–3, 6–4
30	Sep 1963	Wembley Championships, London (United Kingdom)	Wood (i)	(Australia) Lew Hoad	6–4, 6–2, 4–6, 6–3
31	Sep 1963	Rome Italian Pro Championships (Italy)	Clay	(Australia) Rod Laver	6–4, 6–3
32	Jan 1964	Melbourne Pro Championships (Australia)^{1}	Grass	(Australia) Rod Laver	6–4, 6–4
33	Jun 1964	Los Angeles Pro Masters (United States)	Hard	(Australia) Frank Sedgman	6–2, 6–4
34	Jun 1964	Saint-Louis Volkswagen Pro (United States)	Clay	(United States) Pancho Gonzales	6–4, 6–3
35	Jun 1964	Milwaukee Schiltz Pro (United States)	Hard	(United States) Pancho Gonzales	6–4, 3–6, 6–2
36	Aug 1964	San Remo Pro Championships (Italy)^{1}	Clay	(United States) Butch Buchholz	6–1, 6–2
37	Aug 1964	Venise Pro Championships (Italy)^{1}	Clay	(Spain) Andrés Gimeno	3–6, 6–2, 6–4
38	Aug 1964	Cannes Pro Championships (France)	Clay	(United States) Pancho Gonzales	6–3, 3–6, 14–12, 6–4
39	Sep 1964	French Pro Championship, Paris (France)	Wood (i)	(Australia) Rod Laver	6–3, 7–5, 3–6, 6–3
40	Sep 1964	Hanover Pro Championships (Germany)	Clay	(United States) Butch Buchholz	3–6, 6–3, 6–3
41	Oct 1964	Cape Town Western Province (South Africa)	Hard	(United States) Butch Buchholz	2–6, 6–3, 6–4
42	Jan 1965	Brisbane Pro Championships (Australia)	Grass	(Australia) Rod Laver	6–8, 6–2, 6–4
43	Jun 1965	Reston Greater Washington Pro (United States)	Clay	(Australia) Rod Laver	8–6, 6–1
44	Jul 1965	Saint Louis Volkswagen Pro (United States)	Hard	(Spain) Andrés Gimeno	3–6, 6–2, 6–2
45	Jul 1965	U.S. Pro Championship, Chestnut Hill (United States)	Grass	(Australia) Rod Laver	6–4, 6–3, 6–3
46	Sep 1965	French Pro Championship, Paris (France)	Wood (i)	(Australia) Rod Laver	6–3, 6–2, 6–4
47	Sep 1965	Helsinki Scandinavian Pro (Finland)	Hard (i)	(Spain) Andrés Gimeno	6–3, 6–1
48	Jan 1966	Adelaide South Australian Pro (Australia)	Grass	(France) Pierre Barthès	9–7, 3–6, 6–2
49	Jan 1966	Sydney New South Wales Pro (Australia)	Grass	(Spain) Andrés Gimeno	6–4, 6–2
50	Mar 1966	Madison Square Garden Pro, New York City, (United States)	Wood (i)	(Australia) Rod Laver	6–3, 6–3
51	May 1966	Casablanca Pro Championships (Morocco)	Clay	(Spain) Andrés Gimeno	6–3, 6–2
52	Jun 1966	San Rafael Pro R.R. (United States)	Hard	(Australia) Rod Laver (2nd)	31–29
53	Jul 1966	Newport Pro R.R. (United States)	Grass	(Australia) Mal Anderson (2nd)	31–30
54	Oct 1966	French Pro Championship, Paris (France)	Wood (i)	(Australia) Rod Laver	6–3, 6–2, 14–12
55	Oct 1966	Benoni Pro Championships (South Africa)	Hard	(Spain) Andrés Gimeno	7–5 (pro set)
56	Oct 1966	Johannesburg Pro R.R. (South Africa)	Hard	(Australia) Rod Laver (2nd)	31–26
57	Apr 1967	BBC2 Pro Championships, Wembley, (United Kingdom)	Wood (i)	(United States) Dennis Ralston	6–4, 6–2
58	May 1967	Los Angeles Pro Championships	Hard	(Australia) Rod Laver	6–2, 2–6, 7–5
59	Jun 1967	Berkeley Pacific Coast Pro (United States)	Hard	(Australia) Rod Laver	4–6, 6–3, 8–6
60	Jun 1967	Saint Louis U.S. Pro Hard Court (United States)	Hard	(Spain) Andrés Gimeno	6–3, 6–4
61	Jun 1967	Newport Beach Pro (United States)	Hard	(Spain) Andrés Gimeno	6–3, 6–3
62	Sep 1967	Durban Natal Pro (South Africa)	Hard	(Australia) Fred Stolle	6–4, 6–2
63	Sep 1967	Cape Town Western province (South Africa)	Hard	(Australia) Fred Stolle	6–1, 3–6, 6–3
64	Apr 1968 (Note: 19 April 1968: open era didn't officially start until the following week in Bournemouth)	NTL Paris Pro Championships (France)^{3}	Wood (i)	(Spain) Andrés Gimeno	6–3, 6–4

Notes:

- ^{1} : 4-men tournaments
- ^{2} : Players take turns challenging the winner of the last game. Rosewall was the one who won the most matches.
- ^{3} : 1 listed by the ATP website

==== Open era (43 titles) ====
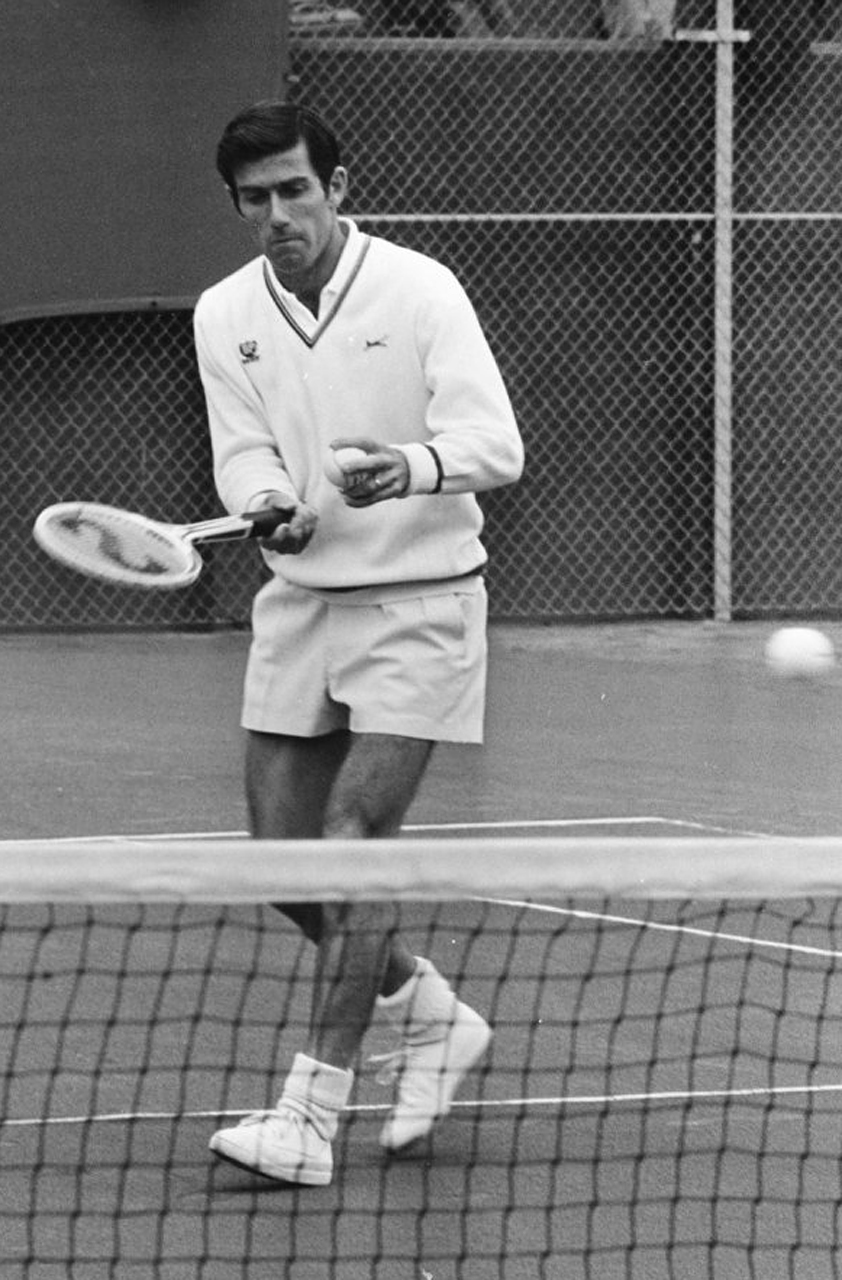
Ken Rosewall at a tournament in Scheveningen, The Netherlands in 1970

Period: 1968–1977
Including 39 (Note: The Paris NTL event took place prior to the open era but is listed on the ATP website as it took place in 1968, the year the open era started.) listed by the ATP.

No.	Date	Championship	Surface	Opponent	Score
1	Apr 1968	Bournemouth British Hard Court (United Kingdom)^{2}	Clay	(Australia) Rod Laver	3–6, 6–2, 6–0, 6–3
2	Jun 1968	French Open, Paris (France)^{2}	Clay	(Australia) Rod Laver	6–3, 6–1, 2–6, 6–2
3	Aug 1968	Fort Worth Colonial Pro (United States)^{2}	Hard	(Spain) Andrés Gimeno	6–4, 6–3
4	Nov 1968	Wembley Pro Tournament of Champions (United Kingdom)^{2}	Carpet (i)	(Australia) John Newcombe	6–4, 4–6, 7–5, 6–4
5	Jun 1969	Bristol West of England Open (United Kingdom)^{2}	Grass	(France) Pierre Barthès	8–10, 6–3, 6–1
6	Sep 1969	Chicago Pro Championships (United States)^{2}	Hard	(United States) Butch Buchholz	6–3, 6–4
7	Oct 1969	Midland Texas Pro Championships (United States)^{1}, ^{2}	?	(United States) Pancho Gonzales	5–7, 6–1, 7–5
8	Feb 1970	Hollywood Pro Championships (United States)^{2}	Clay	(Spain) Andrés Gimeno	3–6, 6–2, 3–6, 7–6, 6–3
9	Feb 1970	Corpus Christi / WCT South Texas Pro (United States)^{2}	Hard	(Australia) John Newcombe	6–2, 6–0
10	Jun 1970	Eastbourne Rothmans Open (United Kingdom)^{2}	Grass	(South Africa) Bob Hewitt	6–2, 6–1
11	Jul 1970	Newport Green Shield Welsh Open (United Kingdom)^{2}	Grass	(Australia) John Newcombe	6–4, 6–4
12	Jul 1970	Cincinnati Western Championships (United States)^{2}	Clay	(United States) Cliff Richey	7–9, 9–7, 8–6
13	Sep 1970	US Open, Forest Hills (United States)^{2}	Grass	(Australia) Tony Roche	2–6, 6–4, 7–6, 6–3
14	Mar 1971	Australian Open, Melbourne (Australia)^{2}	Grass	(United States) Arthur Ashe	6–1, 7–5, 6–3
15	Apr 1971	Johannesburg South African Open (South Africa)^{2}	Hard	(Australia) Fred Stolle	6–4, 6–0, 6–4
16	Apr 1971	Denver United Bank Invitational (United States)^{2}	Carpet (i)	(South Africa) Cliff Drysdale	6–2, 6–2
17	Jul 1971	Newport Green Shield Welsh Open (United Kingdom)^{2}	Grass	(United Kingdom) Roger Taylor	6–1, 9–8
18	Jul 1971	Washington Star International, Washington, D.C. (United States)^{2}	Clay	(United States) Marty Riessen	6–2, 7–5, 6–1
19	Aug 1971	U.S. Pro WCT, Chestnut Hill (United States)^{2}	Hard	(South Africa) Cliff Drysdale	6–4, 6–3, 6–0
20	Oct 1971	Vancouver / WCT Rothmans International (Canada)^{2}	Hard	(Netherlands) Tom Okker	6–2, 6–2, 6–4
21	Nov 1971	Houston & Dallas / WCT Finals (United States)^{1}, ^{2}	Carpet	(Australia) Rod Laver	6–4, 1–6, 7–6, 7–6
22	Jan 1972	Australian Open, Melbourne (Australia)^{2}	Grass	(Australia) Mal Anderson	7–6, 6–3, 7–5
23	Mar 1972	Miami / WCT Saga Bay Classic (United States)^{2}	Hard	(South Africa) Cliff Drysdale	3–6, 6–2, 6–4
24	Mar 1972	Hilton Head / WCT CBS Classic (United States)^{2}	Clay	(Australia) John Newcombe	7–5, 6–3
25	Apr 1972	Charlotte / WCT NCNB Classic (United States)^{2}	Clay	(United States) Cliff Richey	2–6, 6–2, 6–2
26	May 1972	Dallas / WCT Finals (United States)^{2}	Carpet	(Australia) Rod Laver	4–6, 6–0, 6–3, 6–7, 7–6
27	Oct 1972	Tokyo Classic / WCT (Japan)^{2}	Clay	(Australia) Fred Stolle	7–5, 7–6, 6–3
28	Dec 1972	Brisbane Queensland Championships (Australia)^{2}	Grass	(Australia) Geoff Masters	6–2, 5–7, 6–4, 3–6, 7–5
29	Apr 1973	Houston / WCT River Oaks (United States)^{2}	Clay	(Australia) Fred Stolle	6–4, 6–1, 7–5
30	Apr 1973	Cleveland / WCT Championships (United States)^{2}	Carpet (i)	(United Kingdom) Roger Taylor	6–3, 6–4
31	Apr 1973	Charlotte / WCT NCNB Classic (United States)^{2}	Clay	(United States) Arthur Ashe	6–3, 7–6
32	Oct 1973	Osaka Open (Japan)^{2}	Hard	(Japan) Toshiro Sakai	6–2, 6–4
33	Oct 1973	Tokyo Japan Open (Japan)^{2}	Clay	(Australia) John Newcombe	6–1, 6–4
34	Mar 1975	Jackson Invitational (United States)^{2}	Carpet (i)	(United States) Butch Buchholz	7–5, 4–6, 7–6
35	Apr 1975	Houston / WCT River Oaks Invitational (United States)^{2}	Clay	(South Africa) Cliff Drysdale	6–3, 3–6, 6–1
36	May 1975	Louisville Tennis Club Invitational (United States)	Clay	(United States) Stan Smith	7–6, 7–6
37	Jul 1975	Gstaad Swiss Open (Switzerland)^{2}	Clay	(Germany) Karl Meiler	6–4, 6–4, 6–3
38	Oct 1975	Tokyo Gunze Open International (Japan)	Carpet	(Australia) John Newcombe	7–5, 4–6, 6–1
39	Jan 1976	Brisbane Queensland Invitational (Australia)	Grass	(Australia) John Newcombe	7–6, 6–2
40	Mar 1976	Jackson / WCT South Invitational (United States)^{2}	Carpet (i)	(Mexico) Raúl Ramírez	6–3, 6–3
41	Nov 1976	Hong Kong Tennis Classic (British Hong Kong)^{2}	Hard	(Romania) Ilie Năstase	1–6, 6–4, 7–6, 6–0
42	Nov 1977	Hong Kong Colgate Tennis Classic (British Hong Kong)^{2}	Hard	(United States) Tom Gorman	6–3, 5–7, 6–4, 6–4
43	Nov 1977	Tokyo Gunze Open International (Japan)	Carpet	(Romania) Ilie Năstase	4–6, 7–6, 6–4

Notes:

- ^{1} : 4-men tournaments.
- ^{2} : 39 listed by the ATP website

=== Doubles ===
==== Open Era: 29 (14 titles / 15 runner-ups) ====
Result	W-L	Date	Tournament	Surface	Partner	Opponents	Score
Win	1–0	Jun 1968	French Open, Paris	Clay	(Australia) Fred Stolle	(Australia) Roy Emerson (Australia) Rod Laver	6–3, 6–4, 6–3
Loss	1–1	Jul 1968	Wimbledon, London	Grass	(Australia) Fred Stolle	(Australia) John Newcombe (Australia) Tony Roche	6–3, 6–8, 7–5, 12–14, 3–6
Win	2–1	Sep 1968	Los Angeles, US	Hard	(Australia) Fred Stolle	(South Africa) Cliff Drysdale (United Kingdom) Roger Taylor	7–5, 6–1
Loss	2–2	Jan 1969	Australian Open, Melbourne	Grass	(Australia) Fred Stolle	(Australia) Roy Emerson (Australia) Rod Laver	4–6, 4–6
Win	3–2	Sep 1969	US Open, New York	Grass	(Australia) Fred Stolle	(United States) Charlie Pasarell (United States) Dennis Ralston	2–6, 7–5, 13–11, 6–3
Loss	3–3	Apr 1970	Dallas WCT, US	Carpet	(Australia) Fred Stolle	(Australia) Roy Emerson (Australia) Warren Jacques	4–6, 8–6, 4–6
Loss	3–4	Jul 1970	Wimbledon, London	Grass	(Australia) Fred Stolle	(Australia) John Newcombe (Australia) Tony Roche	8–10, 3–6, 1–6
Win	4–4	Jul 1971	Newport, UK	Grass	(United Kingdom) Roger Taylor	(United Kingdom) John Clifton (United Kingdom) John Paish	7–5, 3–6, 6–2
Loss	4–5	Oct 1971	Berkeley, US	Hard	(Australia) Fred Stolle	(Australia) Roy Emerson (Australia) Rod Laver	3–6, 3–6
Win	5–5	Nov 1971	Bologna WCT, Italy	Carpet	(Australia) Fred Stolle	(South Africa) Robert Maud (South Africa) Frew McMillan	6–7, 6–2, 6–3, 6–3
Win	6–5	Jan 1972	Australian Open, Melbourne	Grass	(Australia) Owen Davidson	(Australia) Ross Case (Australia) Geoff Masters	3–6, 7–6, 6–3
Loss	6–6	Apr 1972	Houston WCT, US	Clay	(Australia) Fred Stolle	(Australia) Roy Emerson (Australia) Rod Laver	3–6, 3–6
Loss	6–7	Aug 1972	Fort Worth, US	Hard	(Australia) Fred Stolle	(Netherlands) Tom Okker (United States) Marty Riessen	2–6, 2–6
Loss	6–8	Sep 1972	Montreal WCT, Canada	Hard	(South Africa) Robert Maud	(Netherlands) Tom Okker (United States) Marty Riessen	1–6, 6–4, 6–7
Loss	6–9	Feb 1973	Milan WCT, Italy	Carpet	(Australia) Fred Stolle	(Netherlands) Tom Okker (United States) Marty Riessen	3–6, 3–6
Win	7–9	Mar 1973	Chicago WCT, US	Carpet	(Australia) Fred Stolle	(Egypt) Ismail El Shafei (New Zealand) Brian Fairlie	6–7, 6–4, 6–2
Win	8–9	Apr 1973	Cleveland WCT, US	Carpet	(Australia) Fred Stolle	(Egypt) Ismail El Shafei (New Zealand) Brian Fairlie	6–2, 6–3
Loss	8–10	May 1973	Las Vegas, US	Hard	(Australia) Fred Stolle	(United States) Brian Gottfried (Australia) Dick Stockton	7–6, 4–6, 4–6
Win	9–10	Aug 1973	Toronto, Canada	Hard	(Australia) Rod Laver	(Australia) Owen Davidson (Australia) John Newcombe	7–5, 7–6
Loss	9–11	Oct 1973	Osaka, Japan	Clay	(Japan) Jun Kamiwazumi	(United States) Jeff Borowiak (United States) Tom Gorman	4–6, 6–7
Win	10–11	Oct 1973	Tokyo Outdoor, Japan	Hard	(Australia) Mal Anderson	(Australia) Colin Dibley (Australia) Allan Stone	7–5, 7–5
Loss	10–12	Nov 1973	Sydney, Australia	Hard (i)	(Australia) Mal Anderson	(Australia) Rod Laver (Australia) John Newcombe	6–7, 2–6
Loss	10–13	Jul 1975	Gstaad, Switzerland	Clay	(Rhodesia) Colin Dowdeswell	(West Germany) Jürgen Fassbender (West Germany) Hans-Jürgen Pohmann	4–6, 7–9, 1–6
Win	11–13	Nov 1975	Hong Kong	Hard	(Netherlands) Tom Okker	(Australia) Bob Carmichael (United States) Sandy Mayer	6–3, 6–4
Win	12–13	Apr 1976	Houston WCT, US	Clay	(Australia) Rod Laver	(United States) Charlie Pasarell (Australia) Allan Stone	6–4, 6–2
Win	13–13	Nov 1976	Tokyo Outdoor, Japan	Hard	(Australia) Bob Carmichael	(Egypt) Ismail El Shafei (New Zealand) Brian Fairlie	6–4, 6–4
Loss	13–14	Apr 1977	Jackson, US	Carpet	(Australia) Phil Dent	(South Africa) Bob Hewitt (South Africa) Frew McMillan	2–6, 6–7
Win	14–14	Apr 1977	Charlotte WCT, US	Carpet	(Netherlands) Tom Okker	(Italy) Corrado Barazzutti (Italy) Adriano Panatta	6–1, 3–6, 7–6
Loss	14–15	Oct 1977	Brisbane, Australia	Grass	(Australia) Mal Anderson	(United States) Vitas Gerulaitis (United States) Bill Scanlon	6–7, 4–6

== Professional tours ==
Singles (1957–1967) : 7 tours

No.	Date	Tour	Standings
1	1957; November – December	Australian Pro Tour Incomplete tour results. Each man played 20 matches.	1) (Australia) Ken Rosewall; 2) (Australia) Lew Hoad or (Australia) Frank Sedgman or (Ecuador) Pancho Segura
2	1958; 2 August – 25 October	Perrier Trophy Pro Tour Incomplete tour results.	1) (Australia) Ken Rosewall; 2) (Australia) Lew Hoad or (United States) Tony Trabert or (Ecuador) Pancho Segura
3	1958; November	South African Pro Tour	1) (Australia) Ken Rosewall 12–2; 2) (Ecuador) Pancho Segura 9–5; 3) (Australia) Ashley Cooper 7–7; 4) (Australia) Malcolm Anderson 4–10; 5) (Australia) Mervyn Rose 3–11
4	1962; March	New Zealand Pro Tour	1) (Australia) Ken Rosewall 4–1; 2) (Spain) Andrés Gimeno 3–2; 3) (Australia) Frank Sedgman 2–3; 4) (Chile) Luis Ayala 1–4
5	1963; January	Australasian Pro Tour	1) (Australia) Ken Rosewall 11–2; 2) (Australia) Rod Laver 2–11
6	1963; 8 February – May	World Pro Tour	Round robin: 1) (Australia) Ken Rosewall 31–10; 2) (Australia) Rod Laver 26–16; 3) (United States) Butch Buchholz 23–18; 4) (Spain) Andrés Gimeno 21–20; 5) (United States) Barry MacKay (tennis) 12–29; 6) (Chile) Luis Ayala 11–30; Finals: 1) (Australia) Ken Rosewall 14–4; 2) (Australia) Rod Laver 4–14; 3) (Spain) Andrés Gimeno 11–7; 4) (United States) Butch Buchholz 7–11
7	1964; 28 July – 11 August; 29 September – 8 October	Italian Pro Tour	1) (Australia) Ken Rosewall; 2) (Spain) Andrés Gimeno or (United States) Pancho Gonzales or (United States) Butch Buchholz

== Team events ==
=== Davis Cup ===
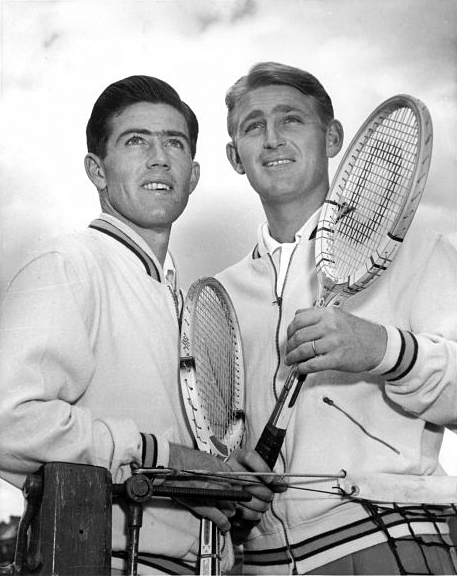
Ken Rosewall (left) and Lew Hoad (right) at the 1954 Davis Cup.

Rosewall won 17 out of 19 Davis Cup singles matches and 2 out of 3 doubles. Rosewall was a member of the victorious Australian Davis Cup teams in 1953, 1955, 1956 and 1973, in all cases defeating USA in the final. He did not personally participate in the 1973 final.

Zone	Round	Date	Opponents	Tie score	Location	Surface	Match	Opponent	W–L	Rubber score
1953 Davis Cup
CR	F	28–31 Dec 1953	United States	3–2	Melbourne	Grass	Singles 2	Tony Trabert	L	3–6, 4–6, 4–6
CR	F	28–31 Dec 1953	United States	3–2	Melbourne	Grass	Singles 4	Vic Seixas	W	6–2, 2–6, 6–3, 6–4
1954 Davis Cup
CR	F	27–29 Dec 1954	United States	2–3	Sydney	Grass	Singles 2	Vic Seixas	L	6–1, 6–4, 6–3
CR	F	27–29 Dec 1954	United States	2–3	Sydney	Grass	Doubles (Hoad)	Vic Seixas; Tony Trabert	L	2–6, 6–4, 2–6, 8–10
CR	F	27–29 Dec 1954	United States	2–3	Sydney	Grass	Singles 5	Tony Trabert	W	9–7, 7–5, 6–3
1955 Davis Cup
A	QF	15–17 Jul 1955	Mexico	5–0	Chicago	Clay	Singles 1	Gustavo Palafox	W	6–3, 7–5, 6–2
A	QF	15–17 Jul 1955	Mexico	5–0	Chicago	Clay	Singles 4	Esteban Reyes	W	6–2, 6–4, 6–3
A	SF	22–24 Jul 1955	Brazil	4–1	Louisville	Grass	Singles 1	Jose Aguero	W	7–5, 6–0, 4–6, 6–3
A	SF	22–24 Jul 1955	Brazil	4–1	Louisville	Grass	Singles 5	Bob Falkenburg	W	6–2, 6–2, 6–3
A	F	29–31 Jul 1955	Canada	5–0	Montreal	Grass	Singles 1	Robert Bedard	W	6–0, 6–1, 4–6, 6–2
A	F	29–31 Jul 1955	Canada	5–0	Montreal	Grass	Singles 5	Henri Rochon	W	6–1, 6–2, 6–1
IZ	SF	5–7 Aug 1955	Japan	4–0	Long Island	Grass	Singles 1	Atsushi Miyagi	W	6–4, 6–4, 6–1
IZ	SF	5–7 Aug 1955	Japan	4–0	Long Island	Grass	Singles 5	Kosei Kamo	W	3–1, unf.
IZ	F	14–16 Aug 1955	Italy	5–0	Philadelphia	Grass	Singles 2	Nicola Pietrangeli	W	8–6, 3–6, 6–1, 6–4
IZ	F	14–16 Aug 1955	Italy	5–0	Philadelphia	Grass	Singles 4	Orlando Sirola	W	6–4, 4–6, 6–1, 6–4
CR	F	26–27 Aug 1955	United States	5–0	New York City	Grass	Singles 1	Vic Seixas	W	6–3, 10–8, 4–6, 6–2
CR	F	26–27 Aug 1955	United States	5–0	New York City	Grass	Singles 5	Ham Richardson	W	6–4, 3–6, 6–1, 6–4
1956 Davis Cup
CR	F	26–28 Dec 1956	United States	5–0	Adelaide	Grass	Singles 2	Vic Seixas	W	6–1, 6–4, 4–6, 6–1
CR	F	26–28 Dec 1956	United States	5–0	Adelaide	Grass	Doubles (Hoad)	Sam Giammalva; Vic Seixas	W	1–6, 6–1, 7–5, 6–4
CR	F	26–28 Dec 1956	United States	5–0	Adelaide	Grass	Singles 4	Sam Giammalva	W	4–6, 6–1, 8–6, 7–5
1973 Davis Cup
IZ	SF	16–18 Nov 1973	Czechoslovakia	4–1	Melbourne	Grass	Doubles (Laver)	Jan Kodeš; Vladimír Zedník	W	6–4, 14–12, 7–9, 8–6
1975 Davis Cup
E	F	28 Feb – 2 Mar 1975	New Zealand	4–0	Auckland	Grass	Singles 2	Onny Parun	W	6–2, 6–4, 6–2
E	F	28 Feb – 2 Mar 1975	New Zealand	4–0	Auckland	Grass	Singles 4	Brian Fairlie	W	6–1, 9–11, 7–5, 9–7

=== Kramer Cup ===
In this pro "Davis Cup-format" team event, held just 3 years (1961–1963) and opposing the subcontinents Australia, Europe, North America and South America, Rosewall won 9 out of 10 singles matches and 4 out of 5 doubles. Australia won all three editions.

== Head to head ==
Rosewall's win–loss record against top players is as follows.

Player	Record	Years
(Australia) Lew Hoad	84–51	1955–1964
(United States) Pancho Gonzales	85–116	1957–1970
(Australia) Rod Laver	75–89	1963–1976
(Romania) Ilie Năstase	6–3	1969–1977
(United States) Jimmy Connors	1–6	1972–1977
(Sweden) Björn Borg	0–1	1973
(Argentina) Guillermo Vilas	2–0	1973, 1976

== Sources ==
- Joe McCauley, The History of Professional Tennis, London 2001.
- Michel Sutter, Vainqueurs Winners 1946–2003, Paris 2003.
- Tony Trabert, Tennis de France.
- Robert Geist, Der Grösste Meister Die denkwürdige Karriere des australischen Tennisspielers Kenneth Robert Rosewall, Vienna 1999.
- Bud Collins, The Bud Collins History of Tennis, 2008.
