= 1972 U.S. Pro Tennis Championships – Singles =

Singles
- 1972 U.S. Pro Tennis Championships

Final
- Champion: (United States) Bob Lutz
- Runner-up: (Netherlands) Tom Okker
- Score: 6–4, 2–6, 6–4, 6–4

Details
- Draw: 32

Events
Singles	Doubles
- U.S. Pro Tennis Championships

The 1972 U.S. Pro Tennis Championships was a men's tennis tournament played on outdoor hard courts at the Longwood Cricket Club in Boston, United States and was part of the 1972 World Championship Tennis circuit. It was the 45th edition of the tournament and was held from August 7 through August 13, 1972.

== Draw ==
Key

- Q = Qualifier
- WC = Wild card
- LL = Lucky loser
- Alt = Alternate
- ITF = ITF entry
- PR = Protected ranking
- SR = Special ranking
- SE = Special exempt
- JE = Junior exempt
- JR = Junior Accelerator Programme entrant
- CO = College Accelerator Programme entrant
- NG = Next Gen Accelerator Program entrant
- w/o = Walkover
- r = Retired
- d = Defaulted

=== Finals ===
Semifinals
(United States) Bob Lutz	6	6	6	6
(South Africa) Cliff Drysdale	4	3	7	3
(Netherlands) Tom Okker	7	7	6
(United States) Arthur Ashe	6	6	4

Final
(United States) Bob Lutz	6	2	6	6
(Netherlands) Tom Okker	4	6	4	4

=== Top half ===
First round
(United States) B Lutz	4	6	7
(Australia) J Newcombe	6	1	6
(New Zealand) B Fairlie	6	6
(Australia) T Addison	1	2
(Egypt) I El Shafei	4	6	7
(United States) F Froehling	6	4	6
(Australia) R Laver	3	6	6
(United States) C Richey	6	4	2
(South Africa) C Drysdale	6	6
(Australia) F Stolle	2	1
(Australia) A Stone	7	7
(Australia) J Alexander	6	6
(United States) T Schroeder	7	1	6
(United States) R Barth	6	6	2
(United States) M Riessen	6	6	7
(Australia) K Rosewall	4	7	5

Second round
(United States) B Lutz	2	6	7
(New Zealand) B Fairlie	6	4	6
(Egypt) Ismail El Shafei	3	2
(Australia) R Laver	6	6
(South Africa) Cliff Drysdale	6	6
(Australia) A Stone	4	2
(United States) T Schroeder	4	2
(United States) M Riessen	6	6

Quarterfinals
(United States) B Lutz	6	6
(Australia) R Laver	4	4
(South Africa) Cliff Drysdale	6	6
(United States) M Riessen	4	4

Semifinals
(United States) B Lutz	6	6	6	6
(South Africa) Cliff Drysdale	4	3	7	3

=== Bottom half ===
First round
(Socialist Federal Republic of Yugoslavia) N Pilić	6	6
(United Kingdom) G Stilwell	4	4
(United States) T Leonard	4	7	7
(Australia) P Dent	6	6	6
(Netherlands) T Okker	6	6
(Australia) B Carmichael	3	2
(South Africa) B Maud	6	6
(Australia) R Ruffels	3	4
(United States) C Pasarell	7	6
(United Kingdom) R Taylor	6	4
(United States) A Ashe	6	6
(United Kingdom) M Cox	4	4
(Pakistan) H Rahim	7	4	6
(United Kingdom) G Battrick	5	6	3
(Australia) T Roche	7	6
(United States) J Borowiak	6	3

Second round
(Socialist Federal Republic of Yugoslavia) N Pilić	6	6
(United States) T Leonard	2	4
(Netherlands) T Okker	6	6
(South Africa) B Maud	3	4
(United States) C Pasarell	6	3	2
(United States) A Ashe	1	6	6
(Pakistan) H Rahim	3	3
(Australia) T Roche	6	6

Quarterfinals
(Socialist Federal Republic of Yugoslavia) N Pilić	7	6	4
(Netherlands) T Okker	6	7	6
(United States) A Ashe	3	7	6
(Australia) T Roche	6	5	4

Semifinals
(Netherlands) T Okker	7	7	6
(United States) A Ashe	6	6	4
