= 1971 Stockholm Open – Singles =

Singles
- 1971 Stockholm Open

Final
- Champion: (United States) Arthur Ashe
- Runner-up: (Czechoslovakia) Jan Kodeš
- Score: 6–1, 3–6, 6–2, 1–6, 6–4

Details
- Draw: 48
- Seeds: 2

Events
Singles	Doubles
← 1970 ·	Stockholm Open	· 1972 →

The 1971 Stockholm Open was a tennis tournament played on hard courts and part of the 1971 Pepsi-Cola Grand Prix and took place in Stockholm, Sweden. The tournament was held from November 1 through November 7, 1971. Arthur Ashe defeated Jan Kodeš, 6–1, 3–6, 6–2, 1–6, 6–4, in the final.

== Seeds ==
1. (Australia) Rod Laver (quarterfinals)
2. (Netherlands) Tom Okker (quarterfinals)

== Draw ==
=== Key ===
- Q = Qualifier
- WC = Wild card
- LL = Lucky loser
- Alt = Alternate
- ITF = ITF entry
- PR = Protected ranking
- SR = Special ranking
- SE = Special exempt
- JE = Junior exempt
- JR = Junior Accelerator Programme entrant
- CO = College Accelerator Programme entrant
- NG = Next Gen Accelerator Program entrant
- w/o = Walkover
- r = Retired
- d = Defaulted

=== Finals ===
Quarterfinals
1	(Australia) Rod Laver	6	4	6
(Czechoslovakia) Jan Kodeš	4	6	7
(Australia) J Alexander	6	4	3
(South Africa) Cliff Drysdale	7	4	6
(United Kingdom) Mark Cox	3	5
(Spain) Andrés Gimeno	6	7
(United States) Arthur Ashe	6	6
2	(Netherlands) Tom Okker	3	3

Semifinals
(Czechoslovakia) Jan Kodeš	2	6	6
(South Africa) Cliff Drysdale	6	2	4
(Spain) Andrés Gimeno	4	3
(United States) Arthur Ashe	6	6

Final
(Czechoslovakia) Jan Kodeš	1	6	2	6	4
(United States) Arthur Ashe	6	3	6	1	6

=== Top half ===
==== Section 1 ====
First round

Second round
1	(Australia) R Laver	6	6
(South Africa) R Maud	3	4
(United States) T Gorman	6	6	5
(Finland) P Saila	1	7	7
(Czechoslovakia) J Kodeš	6	6
(Sweden) L Ölander	0	2
(United States) B Lutz	6	6
(Sweden) J Zabrodsky	3	2

Third round
1	(Australia) R Laver	6	6
(Finland) P Saila	1	1
(Czechoslovakia) J Kodeš	6	6
(United States) B Lutz	4	2

Quarterfinals
1	(Australia) R Laver	6	4	6
(Czechoslovakia) J Kodeš	4	6	7

==== Section 2 ====
First round
(United States) S Smith	6	5
(Sweden) L Johansson	7	7
(South Africa) F McMillan	1	6	4
(New Zealand) B Fairlie	6	1	6
(Australia) J Alexander	5	6	6
(Sweden) M Stig	7	0	4
(United States) T Leonard	6	7
(United States) R Barth	2	5
(South Africa) C Drysdale	3	6	6
(Australia) A Stone	6	3	4
(Sweden) T Svensson	6	4	6
(Sweden) H Zahr	4	6	2
(Australia) R Emerson	6	6
(Denmark) T Ulrich	1	2
(Egypt) I El-Shafei	6	6
(Australia) B Bowrey	4	4

Second round
(Sweden) L Johansson	1	1
(New Zealand) B Fairlie	6	6
(Australia) J Alexander	6	6
(United States) T Leonard	4	4
(South Africa) C Drysdale	6	7
(Sweden) T Svensson	3	6
(Australia) R Emerson	7	3	6
(Egypt) I El-Shafei	5	6	2

Third round
(New Zealand) B Fairlie	6	4
(Australia) J Alexander	7	6
(South Africa) C Drysdale	w/o
(Australia) R Emerson

Quarterfinals
(Australia) J Alexander	6	4	3
(South Africa) C Drysdale	7	4	6

=== Bottom half ===
==== Section 3 ====
First round
(Denmark) J Leschly	6	6
(South Africa) T Ryan	2	2
(United Kingdom) R Taylor	7	6
(Romania) I Năstase	5	4
(Sweden) K Johansson	2	1
(United Kingdom) M Cox	6	6
(Socialist Federal Republic of Yugoslavia) Ž Franulović	4	6	6
(Sweden) B Borg	6	3	3
(United Kingdom) G Stilwell	6	6	6
(Sweden) B Åberg	7	4	3
(Australia) D Crealy	1	4
(Spain) A Gimeno	6	6
(Sweden) O Bengtson	6	6
(United States) J Borowiak	2	4
(Australia) R Ruffels	4	5
(Australia) K Rosewall	6	7

Second round
(Denmark) J Leschly	6	3
(United Kingdom) R Taylor	7	6
(United Kingdom) M Cox	7	6
(Socialist Federal Republic of Yugoslavia) Ž Franulović	6	3
(United Kingdom) G Stilwell	6	2	2
(Spain) A Gimeno	4	6	6
(Sweden) O Bengtson	4	3
(Australia) K Rosewall	6	6

Third round
(United Kingdom) R Taylor	6	4	6
(United Kingdom) M Cox	1	6	7
(Spain) A Gimeno	7	7
(Australia) K Rosewall	6	6

Quarterfinals
(United Kingdom) M Cox	3	5
(Spain) A Gimeno	6	7

==== Section 4 ====
First round

Second round
(Sweden) J-E Lundqvist	4	2
(United States) A Ashe	6	6
(Australia) B Carmichael	6	4	5
(United States) M Riessen	1	6	7
(Australia) P Dent	3	7	1
(United States) C Pasarell	6	6	6
(Australia) F Stolle	6	6
2	(Netherlands) T Okker	7	7

Third round
(United States) A Ashe	6	6
(United States) M Riessen	3	1
(United States) C Pasarell	1	2
2	(Netherlands) T Okker	6	6

Quarterfinals
(United States) A Ashe	6	6
2	(Netherlands) T Okker	3	3
