= 1972 U.S. Pro Tennis Championships – Doubles =

Doubles
- 1972 U.S. Pro Tennis Championships

Final
- Champions: (Australia) John Newcombe (Australia) Tony Roche
- Runners-up: (United States) Arthur Ashe (United States) Bob Lutz
- Score: 6–3, 1–6, 7–6

Details
- Draw: 16

Events
| Singles | Doubles |
- U.S. Pro Tennis Championships

The 1972 U.S. Pro Tennis Championships was a men's tennis tournament played on outdoor hard courts at the Longwood Cricket Club in Boston, United States and was part of the 1972 World Championship Tennis circuit. It was the 45th edition of the tournament and was held from August 7 through August 13, 1972.

== Draw ==
Key

- Q = Qualifier
- WC = Wild card
- LL = Lucky loser
- Alt = Alternate
- ITF = ITF entry
- PR = Protected ranking
- SR = Special ranking
- SE = Special exempt
- JE = Junior exempt
- JR = Junior Accelerator Programme entrant
- CO = College Accelerator Programme entrant
- NG = Next Gen Accelerator Program entrant
- w/o = Walkover
- r = Retired
- d = Defaulted

=== Finals ===
First round
(Netherlands) T Okker (United States) M Riessen | 3 | 6 | 7
(United States) R Barth (United States) T Leonard | 6 | 2 | 5
(United States) A Ashe (United States) B Lutz | 6 | 7
(Australia) R Laver (South Africa) D Schroder | 4 | 6
(Socialist Federal Republic of Yugoslavia) N Pilić (Australia) A Stone | 6 | 6
(United States) F Froehling (United States) C Pasarell | 2 | 4
(Australia) B Carmichael (Australia) R Ruffels | 3 | 6 | 6
(United States) J Borowiak (Pakistan) H Rahim | 6 | 3 | 4
(Australia) T Addison (South Africa) B Maud | 6 | 7
(Australia) J Alexander (Australia) P Dent | 4 | 6
(Egypt) I El Shafei (New Zealand) B Fairlie | 7 | 2 | 7
(South Africa) C Drysdale (United Kingdom) R Taylor | 6 | 6 | 6
(Australia) K Rosewall (Australia) F Stolle | 6 | 6
(United Kingdom) M Cox (United Kingdom) G Stilwell | 4 | 1
(Australia) J Newcombe (Australia) T Roche | 6 | 7
(United Kingdom) G Battrick (United States) C Richey | 3 | 5

Quarterfinals
(Netherlands) T Okker (United States) M Riessen | 6 | 6 | 5
(United States) A Ashe (United States) B Lutz | 4 | 7 | 7
(Socialist Federal Republic of Yugoslavia) N Pilić (Australia) A Stone | 7 | 6
(Australia) B Carmichael (Australia) R Ruffels | 6 | 4
(Australia) T Addison (South Africa) B Maud | 6 | 7
(Egypt) I El Shafei (New Zealand) B Fairlie | 2 | 6
(Australia) K Rosewall (Australia) F Stolle | 3 | 4
(Australia) J Newcombe (Australia) T Roche | 6 | 6

Semifinals
(United States) A Ashe (United States) B Lutz | 6 | 2 | 7
(Socialist Federal Republic of Yugoslavia) N Pilić (Australia) A Stone | 4 | 6 | 5
(Australia) T Addison (South Africa) B Maud | 5 | 5
(Australia) J Newcombe (Australia) T Roche | 7 | 7

Final
(United States) A Ashe (United States) B Lutz | 3 | 6 | 6
(Australia) J Newcombe (Australia) T Roche | 6 | 1 | 7
