= 1971 Stockholm Open – Doubles =

Doubles
- 1971 Stockholm Open

Final
- Champion: (United States) Stan Smith (United States) Tom Gorman
- Runner-up: (United States) Arthur Ashe (United States) Bob Lutz
- Score: 6–4, 6–3

Events
Singles	Doubles
← 1970 ·	Stockholm Open	· 1972 →

The 1971 Stockholm Open was a tennis tournament played on hard courts and part of the 1971 Pepsi-Cola Grand Prix and took place in Stockholm, Sweden. The tournament was held from November 1 through November 7, 1971. Stan Smith and Tom Gorman defeated Arthur Ashe and Bob Lutz, 6–4, 6–3, in the final.

== Seeds ==
1. (Netherlands) Tom Okker / (United States) Marty Riessen (quarterfinals)
2. (Australia) Roy Emerson / (Australia) Rod Laver (second round)

== Draw ==
=== Key ===
- Q = Qualifier
- WC = Wild card
- LL = Lucky loser
- Alt = Alternate
- ITF = ITF entry
- PR = Protected ranking
- SR = Special ranking
- SE = Special exempt
- JE = Junior exempt
- JR = Junior Accelerator Programme entrant
- CO = College Accelerator Programme entrant
- NG = Next Gen Accelerator Program entrant
- w/o = Walkover
- r = Retired
- d = Defaulted

=== Finals ===
Semifinals
(United States) Arthur Ashe (United States) Bob Lutz	6	7
(Australia) Bob Carmichael (Australia) Ray Ruffels	0	6
(Australia) Ken Rosewall (Australia) Fred Stolle	4	4
(United States) Tom Gorman (United States) Stan Smith	6	6

Final
(United States) Arthur Ashe (United States) Bob Lutz	3	4
(United States) Tom Gorman (United States) Stan Smith	6	6

=== Top half ===
First round
(Australia) B Carmichael (Australia) R Ruffels	6	6
(Australia) D Crealy (South Africa) F McMillan	4	3
(Sweden) B Åberg (Sweden) L Ölander	2	4
(Sweden) O Bengtson (Denmark) J Leschly	6	6
(Sweden) B Borg (Sweden) M Stig	4	4
(United States) J Borowiak (United States) T Leonard	6	6
(United States) R Barth (Denmark) T Ulrich	7	6
(Finland) P Säilä (Paraguay) J Zabrodiek	6	4

Second round
1	(Netherlands) T Okker (United States) M Riessen	7	6
(United Kingdom) M Cox (United Kingdom) G Stilwell	5	3
(United States) A Ashe (United States) B Lutz	6	6
(Australia) B Bowrey (South Africa) T Ryan	0	4
(Australia) B Carmichael (Australia) R Ruffels	7	5
(Sweden) O Bengtson (Denmark) J Leschly	6	4
(United States) J Borowiak (United States) T Leonard	6	6
(United States) R Barth (Denmark) T Ulrich	3	3

Quarterfinals
1	(Netherlands) T Okker (United States) M Riessen	4	6
(United States) A Ashe (United States) B Lutz	6	7
(Australia) B Carmichael (Australia) R Ruffels	6	7
(United States) J Borowiak (United States) T Leonard	3	5

Semifinals
(United States) A Ashe (United States) B Lutz	6	7
(Australia) B Carmichael (Australia) R Ruffels	0	6

=== Bottom half ===
First round
(United States) C Pasarell (United Kingdom) R Taylor	4	7	4
(South Africa) B Maud (Australia) A Stone	6	6	6
(Sweden) T Svensson (Sweden) H Zahr	3	4
(Australia) J Alexander (Australia) P Dent	6	6
(South Africa) C Drysdale (Spain) A Gimeno	6	6
(Sweden) K Johansson (Sweden) L Johansson	3	4
(Socialist Federal Republic of Yugoslavia) Ž Franulović (Czechoslovakia) J Kodeš	1	2
(Australia) K Rosewall (Australia) F Stolle	6	6

Second round
(South Africa) B Maud (Australia) A Stone	7	6	6
(Australia) J Alexander (Australia) P Dent	6	7	4
(South Africa) C Drysdale (Spain) A Gimeno	5	6
(Australia) K Rosewall (Australia) F Stolle	7	7
(Egypt) I El Shafei (New Zealand) B Fairlie	4	3
(United States) T Gorman (United States) S Smith	6	6
(Sweden) J-E Lundqvist (Romania) I Năstase	6	6
2	(Australia) R Emerson (Australia) R Laver	4	4

Quarterfinals
(South Africa) B Maud (Australia) A Stone	7	6	4
(Australia) K Rosewall (Australia) F Stolle	6	7	6
(United States) T Gorman (United States) S Smith	6	3	6
(Sweden) J-E Lundqvist (Romania) I Năstase	3	6	3

Semifinals
(Australia) K Rosewall (Australia) F Stolle	4	4
(United States) T Gorman (United States) S Smith	6	6
