= 1971 Rothmans Open – Doubles =

Tennis tournament event

Doubles
- 1971 Rothmans Open

Final
- Champion: (Australia) Ken Rosewall (Australia) Fred Stolle
- Runner-up: (South Africa) Robert Maud (South Africa) Frew McMillan
- Score: 6–7, 6–2, 6–3, 6–3

Details
- Draw: 16

Events
Singles	Doubles
Bologna Indoor	· 1974 →

The 1971 Rothmans Open – Doubles was an event of the 1971 Rothmans Open men's tennis tournament that was played at the Hampton Roads Coliseum in Bologna, Italy from 8 November through 14 November 1971. The draw consisted of 16 teams. Ken Rosewall and Fred Stolle won the doubles title, defeating Robert Maud and Frew McMillan in the final, 6–7, 6–2, 6–3, 6–3.

== Draw ==
=== Key ===
- Q = Qualifier
- WC = Wild card
- LL = Lucky loser
- Alt = Alternate
- ITF = ITF entry
- PR = Protected ranking
- SR = Special ranking
- SE = Special exempt
- JE = Junior exempt
- JR = Junior Accelerator Programme entrant
- CO = College Accelerator Programme entrant
- NG = Next Gen Accelerator Program entrant
- w/o = Walkover
- r = Retired
- d = Defaulted

First Round
(South Africa) Cliff Drysdale (Australia) Rod Laver	6	6
(Australia) Dick Crealy (Australia) Allan Stone	3	2
(United States) Charlie Pasarell (Socialist Federal Republic of Yugoslavia) Nikola Pilić	6	6	6
(Australia) Bill Bowrey (Australia) Owen Davidson	3	7	1
(Australia) Ken Rosewall (Australia) Fred Stolle	6	6
(United States) Jeff Borowiak (United States) Tom Leonard	2	4
(Italy) Adriano Panatta (Italy) Nicola Pietrangeli	7	6
(Australia) John Alexander (Australia) Phil Dent	6	3
(United States) Arthur Ashe (United States) Bob Lutz	6	6
(Socialist Federal Republic of Yugoslavia) Željko Franulović (United Kingdom) Roger Taylor	4	4
(Australia) Bob Carmichael (Australia) Ray Ruffels	7	7
(United States) Roy Barth (Denmark) Torben Ulrich	5	6
(South Africa) Frew McMillan (South Africa) Bob Maud	w/o
(Egypt) Ismail El Shafei (New Zealand) Brian Fairlie
(Netherlands) Tom Okker (United States) Marty Riessen	7	6
(United Kingdom) Mark Cox (United Kingdom) Graham Stilwell	5	1

Quarterfinals
(South Africa) Cliff Drysdale (Australia) Rod Laver	4	6
(United States) Charlie Pasarell (Socialist Federal Republic of Yugoslavia) Nikola Pilić	6	7
(Australia) Ken Rosewall (Australia) Fred Stolle	7	7
(Italy) Adriano Panatta (Italy) Nicola Pietrangeli	6	6
(United States) Arthur Ashe (United States) Bob Lutz	6	6
(Australia) Bob Carmichael (Australia) Ray Ruffels	2	4
(South Africa) Frew McMillan (South Africa) Bob Maud	w/o
(Netherlands) Tom Okker (United States) Marty Riessen

Semifinals
(United States) Charlie Pasarell (Socialist Federal Republic of Yugoslavia) Nikola Pilić	5	3
(Australia) Ken Rosewall (Australia) Fred Stolle	7	6
(United States) Arthur Ashe (United States) Bob Lutz	6	7	4
(South Africa) Frew McMillan (South Africa) Bob Maud	7	5	6

Final
(Australia) Ken Rosewall (Australia) Fred Stolle	6	6	6	6
(South Africa) Frew McMillan (South Africa) Bob Maud	7	2	3	3
