= 1971 Stockholm Open =

- Date: 1–7 November
- Edition: 3rd
- Category: WCT circuit
- Draw: 64S / 32D
- Prize money: $50,000
- Location: Stockholm, Sweden
- Venue: Kungliga tennishallen

Champions

Singles
- (United States) Arthur Ashe

Doubles
- (United States) Tom Gorman / (United States) Stan Smith
← 1970 ·	Stockholm Open	· 1972 →

The 1971 Stockholm Open was a men's tennis tournament played on indoor hard courts and part of the 1971 World Championship Tennis circuit and took place at the Kungliga tennishallen in Stockholm, Sweden. The tournament was held from 1 November through 7 November 1971. Arthur Ashe won the singles title and $10,000 first prize money.

== Finals ==
=== Singles ===
(United States) Arthur Ashe defeated (Czechoslovakia) Jan Kodeš, 6–1, 3–6, 6–2, 1–6, 6–4

=== Doubles ===
(United States) Tom Gorman / (United States) Stan Smith defeated (United States) Arthur Ashe / (United States) Bob Lutz, 6–3, 6–4
