= 1971 Torneo Godó =

- Date: 18–24 October
- Edition: 18th
- Category: WCT
- Draw: 64S / 32D
- Prize money: $70,000
- Surface: Clay / outdoor
- Location: Barcelona, Spain
- Venue: Real Club de Tenis Barcelona

Champions

Singles
- (Spain) Manuel Orantes

Doubles
- (Socialist Federal Republic of Yugoslavia) Željko Franulović / (Spain) Juan Gisbert
- Torneo Godó

The 1971 Torneo Godó or Trofeo Conde de Godó was a men's tennis tournament that took place on outdoor clay courts in Barcelona, Spain. It was the 18th edition of the event and was part of the 1971 World Championship Tennis circuit, although it was also open to non-WCT players. It was held from 18 October until 24 October 1971. Manuel Orantes, an independent pro, won the singles title.

== Finals ==
=== Singles ===
(Spain) Manuel Orantes defeated (United States) Bob Lutz 6–4, 6–3, 6–4

=== Doubles ===
(Socialist Federal Republic of Yugoslavia) Željko Franulović / (Spain) Juan Gisbert defeated (South Africa) Cliff Drysdale / (Spain) Andrés Gimeno 7–6, 6–2, 7–6
