= 1971 Rothmans Open =

- Date: 8–14 November
- Edition: 1st
- Category: WCT circuit
- Draw: 41S / 16D
- Prize money: $50,000
- Surface: Carpet / indoor
- Location: Bologna, Italy

Champions

Singles
- (Australia) Rod Laver

Doubles
- (Australia) Ken Rosewall / (Australia) Fred Stolle
Bologna Indoor	· 1974 →

The 1971 Rothmans Open, also known as the Italian International Open and Bologna WCT, was a men's tennis tournament played on indoor carpet courts that was part of the 1971 World Championship Tennis circuit and took place in Bologna, Italy. It was the first edition of the tournament and was held from 8 November through 14 November 1971. Rod Laver won the singles title and earned $10,000 first prize money.

== Finals ==
=== Singles ===
(Australia) Rod Laver defeated (United States) Arthur Ashe 6–3, 6–4, 6–4

=== Doubles ===
(Australia) Ken Rosewall / (Australia) Fred Stolle defeated (South Africa) Robert Maud / (South Africa) Frew McMillan 6–7, 6–2, 6–3, 6–3
