= 1972 U.S. Pro Tennis Championships =

- Date: July 31 – August 6
- Edition: 45th
- Category: WCT circuit
- Draw: 32S / 16D
- Prize money: $50,000
- Surface: Hard / outdoor
- Location: Chestnut Hill, Massachusetts, United States
- Venue: Longwood Cricket Club

Champions

Singles
- (United States) Bob Lutz

Doubles
- (Australia) John Newcombe / (Australia) Tony Roche
← 1971 ·	U.S. Pro Tennis Championships	· 1973 →

The 1972 U.S. Pro Tennis Championships was a men's tennis tournament played on outdoor hard courts at the Longwood Cricket Club in Chestnut Hill, Massachusetts in the United States and was part of the 1972 World Championship Tennis circuit. It was the 45th edition of the tournament and was held from July 31 through August 6, 1972. Bob Lutz defeated John Newcombe, Rod Laver and Cliff Drysdale prior to beating Tom Okker in the Finals.

== Finals ==
=== Singles ===
(United States) Bob Lutz defeated (Netherlands) Tom Okker, 6–4, 2–6, 6–4, 6–4

=== Doubles ===
(Australia) John Newcombe / (Australia) Tony Roche defeated (United States) Arthur Ashe / (United States) Bob Lutz, 6–3, 1–6, 7–6
