= 1971 Masters =

1971 Masters may refer to:

- 1971 Masters Tournament, golf
- 1971 Pepsi-Cola Masters, tennis
