= 1971 Aryamehr Cup =

- Date: 10–16 May
- Edition: 1st
- Category: WCT
- Draw: 32S / 16D
- Prize money: $50,000
- Surface: Clay / outdoor
- Location: Tehran, Iran
- Venue: Imperial Country Club

Champions

Singles
- (United States) Marty Riessen

Doubles
- (Australia) John Newcombe / (Australia) Tony Roche
- Aryamehr Cup

The 1971 Aryamehr Cup was a men's professional tennis tournament played on outdoor clay courts at the Imperial Country Club in Tehran in Iran. The event was part of the 1971 World Championship Tennis circuit. It was the first edition of the tournament and was held from 10 May through 16 May 1971. Marty Riessen won the singles title.

== Finals ==
=== Singles ===
(United States) Marty Riessen defeated (Australia) John Alexander 6–7, 6–1, 6–3, 7–6

=== Doubles ===
(Australia) John Newcombe / (Australia) Tony Roche defeated (Australia) Bob Carmichael / (Australia) Ray Ruffels 6–4, 6–7, 6–1
