= 1971 World Championship Tennis Finals =

- Date: November 18–26
- Edition: 1st
- Category: World Championship Tennis
- Draw: 8S
- Prize money: $100,000
- Surface: Carpet / indoor
- Location: Houston, Texas, United States; Dallas, Texas, United States (final)
- Venue: Hofheinz Pavilion; Memorial Auditorium (final)

Champions

Singles
- (Australia) Ken Rosewall
- WCT Finals

The 1971 World Championship Tennis Finals was a men's tennis tournament played on indoor Sportface carpet courts. It was the first edition of the WCT Finals and the concluding event of the 1971 World Championship Tennis circuit. The eight top players in ranking points after the initial 20 tournaments of the circuit qualified for the play-off event. The quarterfinals and semifinals were played at the Hofheinz Pavilion in Houston, Texas from November 19 through November 21 while the final, watched by 8,200 spectators, was played at the Memorial Auditorium in Dallas, Texas, United States on November 26. Ken Rosewall win the event and the accompanying $50,000 first-prize money. Neil Armstrong presented the prizes.

== Final ==
=== Singles ===
(Australia) Ken Rosewall defeated (Australia) Rod Laver 6–4, 1–6, 7–6^{(7–3)}, 7–6^{(7–4)}

- It was Rosewall's 8th title of the year and the 16th of his open professional career.

== See also ==
- 1971 Pepsi-Cola Masters
- Laver–Rosewall rivalry
