= 1971 U.S. Pro Tennis Championships =

- Date: August 2–8
- Edition: 44th
- Category: WCT circuit
- Draw: 32S / 16D
- Prize money: $50,000
- Surface: Hard / outdoor
- Location: Chestnut Hill, Massachusetts, United States
- Venue: Longwood Cricket Club

Champions

Singles
- (Australia) Ken Rosewall

Doubles
- (Australia) Roy Emerson / (Australia) Rod Laver
| ← 1970 · | U.S. Pro Tennis Championships | · 1972 → |

The 1971 U.S. Pro Tennis Championships was a men's tennis tournament played on outdoor hard courts at the Longwood Cricket Club in Chestnut Hill, Massachusetts in the United States and was part of the 1971 World Championship Tennis circuit. It was the 44th edition of the tournament and was held from August 2 through August 8, 1971. Sixth-seeded Ken Rosewall won the singles title, his third U.S. Pro title, and the accompanying $10,000 first-prize money. (Note: Rosewall switched from a wooden to an aluminum racket during his quarterfinal match against Arthur Ashe. He was the ninth consecutive Australian winner of the singles title.) The final was watched by 5,500 spectators.

== Finals ==
=== Singles ===
(Australia) Ken Rosewall defeated (South Africa) Cliff Drysdale 6–4, 6–3, 6–0

=== Doubles ===
(Australia) Roy Emerson / (Australia) Rod Laver defeated (Netherlands) Tom Okker / (United States) Marty Riessen 6–4, 6–4
