= Bob Lutz (tennis) =

American tennis player (born 1947)

- Country (sports): United States
- Born: August 29, 1947 (age 79) Lancaster Pa.USA
- Height: 5 ft 11 in (1.80 m)
- Turned pro: 1970 (amateur from 1965)
- Retired: 1982
- Plays: Right-handed (one-handed backhand)
- Prize money: $1,165,276

Singles
- Career record: 468–303 in pre Open-Era & Open Era
- Career titles: 11
- Highest ranking: No. 7 (1972, Bud Collins)

Grand Slam singles results
- Australian Open: SF (1971)
- French Open: 4R (1971)
- Wimbledon: QF (1969)
- US Open: 4R (1967, 1971, 1972, 1978, 1982)

Other tournaments
- WCT Finals: SF (1976)

Doubles
- Career record: 494–215
- Career titles: 43
- Highest ranking: No. 6 (April 30, 1977)

Grand Slam doubles results
- Australian Open: W (1970)
- French Open: F (1974)
- Wimbledon: F (1974, 1980, 1981)
- US Open: W (1968, 1974, 1978, 1980)

Robert Lutz (born August 29, 1947) is an American former amateur and a professional tennis player of the 1960s and 1970s. He and Stan Smith were one of the best doubles teams of all time. Bud Collins ranked Lutz as world No. 7 in singles in 1972. From 1967 to 1977, he was ranked amongst the top-10 American players eight times, with his highest ranking being No. 5 in both 1968 and 1970. During his career he won 11 singles and 43 doubles titles.

== Career ==
Lutz won the 1967 NCAA singles title, and with Stan Smith, won the NCAA doubles crown in 1967 and 1968. He won the men's singles in the Ojai Tennis Tournament in 1966.

During his career, he won 11 singles titles, the most important being the U.S. Pro Tennis Championships in 1972 and the Paris Masters in 1978. He reached 15 other singles finals, including Cincinnati in 1974. He won 43 doubles titles, 37 of which were won with Stan Smith, and he reached 30 other doubles finals. With Smith, he formed the only team to win the doubles title at U.S. Championships on four different surfaces (clay, grass, hard and indoor). His doubles titles include the US Open in 1980, 1978, 1974, and 1968; the Australian Open in 1970 and Cincinnati in 1969. In addition, he played on five winning Davis Cup teams between 1968 and 1981 and had a 14–2 record playing doubles. Lutz was nominated for the ITF Tennis Hall of Fame thanks to these achievements.

== Honors and personal life ==
He was inducted into the Collegiate Tennis Hall of Fame in 1984. Lutz, a 1971 graduate of the University of Southern California, was inducted into the school's Hall of Fame in 2009. He has been living in San Clemente, California since 1973 with his wife Sharon and their daughters Samantha and Allison.

== Grand Slam finals ==
=== Doubles ===
Result	Year	Championship	Surface	Partner	Opponents	Score
Win	1968	US Open	Grass	(United States) Stan Smith	(United States) Arthur Ashe (Spain) Andrés Gimeno	11–9, 6–1, 7–5
Win	1970	Australian Open	Grass	(United States) Stan Smith	(Australia) John Alexander (Australia) Phil Dent	8–6, 6–3, 6–4
Loss	1974	French Open	Clay	(United States) Stan Smith	(Australia) Dick Crealy (Australia) Onny Parun	3–6, 2–6, 6–3, 7–5, 1–6
Loss	1974	Wimbledon	Grass	(United States) Stan Smith	(Australia) John Newcombe (Australia) Tony Roche	6–8, 4–6, 4–6
Win	1974	US Open (2)	Clay	(United States) Stan Smith	(Chile) Patricio Cornejo (Chile) Jaime Fillol	6–3, 6–3
Win	1978	US Open (3)	Hard	(United States) Stan Smith	(United States) Marty Riessen (United States) Sherwood Stewart	1–6, 7–5, 6–3
Loss	1979	US Open	Hard	(United States) Stan Smith	(United States) Peter Fleming (United States) John McEnroe	4–6, 4–6, 4–6
Win	1980	US Open (4)	Hard	(United States) Stan Smith	(United States) Peter Fleming (United States) John McEnroe	7–6, 3–6, 6–1, 3–6, 6–3
Loss	1980	Wimbledon	Grass	(United States) Stan Smith	(Australia) Peter McNamara (Australia) Paul McNamee	6–7, 3–6, 7–6, 4–6
Loss	1981	Wimbledon	Grass	(United States) Stan Smith	(United States) Peter Fleming (United States) John McEnroe	4–6, 4–6, 4–6

== Career finals ==
=== Singles: 26 (11 wins / 15 losses) ===
Result	W/L	Date	Tournament	Surface	Opponent	Score
Loss	0–1	Aug 1968	U.S. Championships, Boston	Grass	(United States) Arthur Ashe	6–4, 3–6, 10–8, 0–6, 4–6
Win	1–1	Jun 1970	Manchester, UK	Grass	(United States) Tom Gorman	6–2, 9–7
Win	2–1	Aug 1970	Columbus, US	Hard	(United States) Tom Gorman	7–5, 1–6, 6–4, 6–2
Win	3–1	Sep 1971	Sacramento, US	Hard	(United States) Alex Olmedo	3–6, 6–4, 6–3
Win	4–1	Oct 1971	Cologne WCT, Germany	Carpet (i)	(United States) Jeff Borowiak	6–3, 6–7, 6–3, 6–2
Loss	4–2	Oct 1971	Barcelona WCT, Spain	Clay	(Spain) Manuel Orantes	4–6, 3–6, 4–6
Win	5–2	Aug 1972	Boston WCT, US	Hard	(Netherlands) Tom Okker	6–4, 2–6, 6–4, 6–4
Loss	5–3	Oct 1972	Essen WCT, Germany	Carpet (i)	(Socialist Federal Republic of Yugoslavia) Nikola Pilić	6–4, 4–6, 6–3, 4–6, 6–7
Loss	5–4	Nov 1972	Rome, Italy	Carpet (i)	(United States) Arthur Ashe	2–6, 6–3, 3–6, 6–3, 6–7
Loss	5–5	Feb 1973	Philadelphia WCT, US	Carpet (i)	(United States) Stan Smith	6–7, 6–7, 6–4, 4–6
Loss	5–6	Aug 1974	Cincinnati, US	Hard	(United States) Marty Riessen	6–7, 6–7
Win	6–6	Apr 1975	Tokyo WCT, Japan	Carpet	(United States) Stan Smith	6–4, 6–4
Loss	6–7	Aug 1975	Columbus, US	Clay	(India) Vijay Amritraj	4–6, 5–7
Loss	6–8	Oct 1975	Sydney Indoor, Australia	Hard (i)	(United States) Stan Smith	6–7, 2–6
Loss	6–9	Feb 1976	Rome WCT, Italy	Carpet (i)	(United States) Arthur Ashe	2–6, 6–0, 3–6
Loss	6–10	Feb 1976	Rotterdam WCT, Netherlands	Carpet (i)	(United States) Arthur Ashe	3–6, 3–6
Loss	6–11	Oct 1976	Maui, US	Hard	(United States) Harold Solomon	3–6, 7–5, 5–7
Loss	6–12	Feb 1977	Ocean City, US	Hard	(United States) Vitas Gerulaitis	6–3, 1–6, 2–6
Loss	6–13	Mar 1977	Washington Indoor, US	Carpet (i)	(United States) Brian Gottfried	1–6, 2–6
Loss	6–14	Aug 1978	Columbus, US	Clay	(United States) Arthur Ashe	3–6, 4–6
Win	7–14	Nov 1978	Paris Indoor, France	Hard (i)	(United States) Tom Gullikson	6–2, 6–2, 7–6
Win	8–14	Nov 1979	Taipei, Taiwan	Carpet	(United States) Pat DuPré	6–3, 6–4, 2–6, 6–3
Win	9–14	Aug 1980	Columbus, US	Hard	(Australia) Terry Rocavert	6–4, 6–3
Win	10–14	Aug 1980	Stowe, US	Hard	(South Africa) Johan Kriek	6–3, 6–1
Win	11–14	Nov 1980	Cologne, Germany	Carpet (i)	(United States) Nick Saviano	6–4, 6–0
Loss	11–15	May 1983	Tampa, US	Carpet	(United States) Johan Kriek	2–6, 4–6

Source: ATP

=== Doubles: 76 (43 wins / 33 losses) ===
Result	W/L	Date	Tournament	Surface	Partner	Opponents	Score
Win	1–0	Sep 1968	US Open, New York	Grass	(United States) Stan Smith	(United States) Arthur Ashe (Spain) Andrés Gimeno	11–9, 6–1, 7–5
Loss	1–1	Jul 1969	Washington D.C., US	Clay	(United States) Stan Smith	(Chile) Patricio Cornejo (Chile) Jaime Fillol	6–4, 1–6, 4–6
Win	2–1	Jul 1969	Cincinnati, US	Clay	(United States) Stan Smith	(United States) Arthur Ashe (United States) Charlie Pasarell	6–3, 6–4
Win	3–1	Jan 1970	Australian Open, Sydney	Grass	(United States) Stan Smith	(Australia) John Alexander (Australia) Phil Dent	8–6, 6–3, 6–4
Loss	3–2	Sep 1970	Los Angeles, US	Hard	(United States) Stan Smith	(Netherlands) Tom Okker (United States) Marty Riessen	6–7, 2–6
Win	4–2	Oct 1970	Berkeley, US	Hard	(United States) Stan Smith	(United States) Roy Barth (United States) Tom Gorman	6–2, 7–5, 4–6, 6–2
Loss	4–3	May 1971	Dallas WCT, US	Carpet (i)	(United States) Charlie Pasarell	(Netherlands) Tom Okker (United States) Marty Riessen	3–6, 4–6
Loss	4–4	Nov 1971	Stockholm, Sweden	Hard (i)	(United States) Arthur Ashe	(United States) Tom Gorman (United States) Stan Smith	4–6, 3–6
Win	5–4	Feb 1972	Philadelphia WCT, US	Carpet (i)	(United States) Arthur Ashe	(Australia) John Newcombe (Australia) Tony Roche	6–3, 6–7, 6–3
Loss	5–5	Jul 1972	Louisville WCT, US	Clay	(United States) Arthur Ashe	(Australia) John Alexander (Australia) Phil Dent	4–6, 3–6
Loss	5–6	Aug 1972	Boston WCT, US	Hard	(United States) Arthur Ashe	(Australia) John Newcombe (Australia) Tony Roche	3–6, 6–1, 6–7
Loss	5–7	Nov 1972	Rotterdam WCT, Netherlands	Carpet (i)	(United States) Arthur Ashe	(Australia) Roy Emerson (Australia) John Newcombe	6–7, 6–7
Win	6–7	Apr 1973	Brussels WCT, Belgium	Carpet (i)	(United States) Stan Smith	(Australia) John Alexander (Australia) Phil Dent	6–4, 7–6
Win	7–7	Apr 1973	Johannesburg WCT, South Africa	Hard	(United States) Stan Smith	(South Africa) Frew McMillan (Australia) Allan Stone	6–1, 6–4, 6–4
Win	8–7	May 1973	World Doubles WCT, Montreal	Carpet (i)	(United States) Stan Smith	(Netherlands) Tom Okker (United States) Marty Riessen	6–2, 7–6, 6–0
Win	9–7	Mar 1974	Atlanta WCT, US	Clay	(United States) Stan Smith	(United States) Brian Gottfried (United States) Dick Stockton	6–3, 3–6, 7–6
Win	10–7	Apr 1974	New Orleans WCT, US	Other	(United States) Stan Smith	(Australia) Owen Davidson (Australia) John Newcombe	4–6, 6–4, 7–6
Loss	10–8	Jun 1974	French Open, Paris	Clay	(United States) Stan Smith	(Australia) Dick Crealy (New Zealand) Onny Parun	3–6, 2–6, 6–3, 7–5, 1–6
Loss	10–9	Jun 1974	Nottingham, UK	Grass	(United States) Stan Smith	(United States) Charlie Pasarell (United States) Erik van Dillen	4–6, 7–9
Loss	10–10	Jul 1974	Wimbledon, London	Grass	(United States) Stan Smith	(Australia) John Newcombe (Australia) Tony Roche	6–8, 4–6, 4–6
Win	11–10	Aug 1974	Boston, US	Clay	(United States) Stan Smith	(West Germany) Hans-Jürgen Pohmann (United States) Marty Riessen	3–6, 6–4, 6–3
Loss	11–11	Aug 1974	Columbus, US	Hard	(United States) Tom Gorman	(India) Anand Amritraj (India) Vijay Amritraj	def.
Win	12–11	Sep 1974	US Open, New York	Grass	(United States) Stan Smith	(Chile) Patricio Cornejo (Chile) Jaime Fillol	6–3, 6–3
Win	13–11	Sep 1974	San Francisco, US	Carpet	(United States) Stan Smith	(Australia) John Alexander (Australia) Syd Ball	6–4, 7–6
Win	14–11	Feb 1975	Fort Worth WCT, US	Hard	(United States) Stan Smith	(Australia) John Alexander (Australia) Phil Dent	6–7, 7–6, 6–3
Win	15–11	Apr 1975	Tokyo Indoor, Japan	Carpet (i)	(United States) Stan Smith	(Australia) John Alexander (Australia) Phil Dent	6–4, 6–7, 6–2
Win	16–11	Apr 1975	Houston, US	Clay	(United States) Stan Smith	(United States) Mike Estep (New Zealand) Russell Simpson	7–5, 7–6
Win	17–11	Jul 1975	Washington D.C., US	Clay	(United States) Stan Smith	(United States) Brian Gottfried (Mexico) Raúl Ramírez	7–5, 2–6, 6–1
Win	18–11	Aug 1975	Columbus Open, US	Clay	(United States) Stan Smith	(West Germany) Jürgen Fassbender (West Germany) Hans-Jürgen Pohmann	6–2, 6–7, 6–3
Win	19–11	Jan 1976	Indianapolis WCT, US	Carpet (i)	(United States) Stan Smith	(United States) Vitas Gerulaitis (United States) Tom Gorman	6–2, 6–4
Win	20–11	Feb 1976	Barcelona WCT, Spain	Clay	(United States) Stan Smith	(Poland) Wojciech Fibak (West Germany) Karl Meiler	6–3, 6–3
Win	21–11	Feb 1976	Rome WCT, Italy	Clay	(United States) Stan Smith	(Australia) Dick Crealy (South Africa) Frew McMillan	6–7, 6–3, 6–4
Loss	21–12	May 1976	World Doubles WCT, Kansas City	Carpet (i)	(United States) Stan Smith	(Poland) Wojciech Fibak (West Germany) Karl Meiler	3–6, 6–2, 6–3, 3–6, 4–6
Loss	21–13	May 1976	Las Vegas, US	Hard	(United States) Stan Smith	(United States) Arthur Ashe (United States) Charlie Pasarell	4–6, 2–6
Win	22–13	Sep 1976	Los Angeles, US	Hard	(United States) Stan Smith	(United States) Arthur Ashe (United States) Charlie Pasarell	6–2, 3–6, 6–3
Loss	22–14	Mar 1977	Memphis, US	Hard	(United States) Stan Smith	(United States) Fred McNair (United States) Sherwood Stewart	6–4, 6–7, 6–7
Win	23–14	Mar 1977	Washington Indoor, US	Carpet (i)	(United States) Stan Smith	(United States) Brian Gottfried (Mexico) Raúl Ramírez	6–3, 7–5
Loss	23–15	Apr 1977	Los Angeles PSW U.S.	Hard	(United States) Stan Smith	(South Africa) Bob Hewitt (South Africa) Frew McMillan	3–6, 4–6
Win	24–15	May 1977	Las Vegas, US	Hard	(United States) Stan Smith	(South Africa) Bob Hewitt (Mexico) Raúl Ramírez	6–3, 3–6, 6–4
Win	25–15	Aug 1977	Columbus, US	Clay	(United States) Stan Smith	(United States) Peter Fleming (United States) Gene Mayer	4–6, 7–5, 6–2
Loss	25–16	Aug 1977	Boston, US	Clay	(United States) Stan Smith	(United States) Brian Gottfried (South Africa) Bob Hewitt	3–6, 4–6
Win	26–16	Oct 1977	Maui, US	Hard	(United States) Stan Smith	(United States) Brian Gottfried (Mexico) Raúl Ramírez	7–6, 6–4
Win	27–16	Dec 1977	Johannesburg WCT, South Africa	Hard	(United States) Stan Smith	(United States) Peter Fleming (South Africa) Raymond Moore	6–3, 7–5, 6–7, 7–6
Loss	27–17	Jan 1978	Masters, New York City	Carpet	(United States) Stan Smith	(South Africa) Bob Hewitt (South Africa) Frew McMillan	5–7, 6–7, 3–6
Win	28–17	Feb 1978	Springfield, US	Carpet	(United States) Stan Smith	(Czechoslovakia) Jan Kodeš (United States) Marty Riessen	6–3, 6–3
Win	29–17	Mar 1978	Washington Indoor, US	Carpet (i)	(United States) Stan Smith	(United States) Arthur Ashe (United States) John McEnroe	6–7, 7–5, 6–1
Loss	29–18	Apr 1978	Rotterdam WCT, Netherlands	Carpet (i)	(United States) Stan Smith	(United States) Fred McNair (Mexico) Raúl Ramírez	2–6, 3–6
Loss	29–19	May 1978	World Doubles WCT, US	Carpet (i)	(United States) Stan Smith	(Poland) Wojciech Fibak (Netherlands) Tom Okker	7–6, 4–6, 0–6, 3–6
Win	30–19	Sep 1978	US Open, New York	Hard	(United States) Stan Smith	(United States) Marty Riessen (United States) Sherwood Stewart	1–6, 7–5, 6–3
Loss	30–20	Oct 1978	San Francisco, US	Carpet	(United States) Stan Smith	(United States) Peter Fleming (United States) John McEnroe	7–5, 4–6, 4–6
Loss	30–21	Nov 1978	Stockholm, Sweden	Hard (i)	(United States) Stan Smith	(Poland) Wojciech Fibak (Netherlands) Tom Okker	3–6, 2–6
Win	31–21	Feb 1979	Denver, US	Carpet (i)	(United States) Stan Smith	(Poland) Wojciech Fibak (Netherlands) Tom Okker	7–6, 6–3
Win	32–21	Mar 1979	Washington Indoor, US	Carpet (i)	(United States) Stan Smith	(Australia) Bob Carmichael (United States) Brian Teacher	6–4, 7–5, 3–6, 7–6
Loss	32–22	Mar 1979	New Orleans, US	Carpet	(United States) Stan Smith	(United States) Peter Fleming (United States) John McEnroe	1–6, 3–6
Win	33–22	Jul 1979	Newport, US	Grass	(United States) Stan Smith	(Australia) John James (Australia) Chris Kachel	6–4, 7–6
Win	34–22	Aug 1979	Columbus, US	Clay	(United States) Brian Gottfried	(United States) Tim Gullikson (United States) Tom Gullikson	4–6, 6–3, 7–6
Win	35–22	Aug 1979	Cleveland, US	Hard	(United States) Stan Smith	(Paraguay) Francisco González (United States) Fred McNair	6–3, 6–4
Loss	35–23	Aug 1979	Cincinnati, US	Hard	(United States) Stan Smith	(United States) Brian Gottfried (Romania) Ilie Năstase	6–1, 3–6, 6–7
Loss	35–24	Sep 1979	US Open, New York	Hard	(United States) Stan Smith	(United States) Peter Fleming (United States) John McEnroe	2–6, 4–6
Win	36–24	Nov 1979	Hong Kong	Hard	(United States) Pat DuPré	(United States) Steve Denton (United States) Mark Turpin	6–3, 6–4
Loss	36–25	Nov 1979	Taipei, Taiwan	Carpet	(United States) Pat DuPré	(Australia) Mark Edmondson (Australia) John Marks	1–6, 6–3, 4–6
Win	37–25	Apr 1980	Tulsa, US	Hard (i)	(United States) Dick Stockton	(Paraguay) Francisco González (United States) Fred McNair	2–6, 7–6, 6–2
Win	38–25	Apr 1980	Las Vegas, US	Hard	(United States) Stan Smith	(Poland) Wojciech Fibak (United States) Gene Mayer	6–2, 7–5
Loss	38–26	Jul 1980	Wimbledon, London	Grass	(United States) Stan Smith	(Australia) Peter McNamara (Australia) Paul McNamee	6–7, 3–6, 7–6, 4–6
Win	39–26	Aug 1980	Stowe, US	Hard	(South Africa) Bernard Mitton	(Romania) Ilie Năstase (United States) Ferdi Taygan	6–4, 6–3
Win	40–26	Sep 1980	US Open, New York	Hard	(United States) Stan Smith	(United States) Peter Fleming (United States) John McEnroe	7–6, 3–6, 6–1, 3–6, 6–3
Loss	40–27	Sep 1980	Sawgrass Doubles, US	Hard	(United States) Stan Smith	(United States) Brian Gottfried (Mexico) Raúl Ramírez	6–7, 4–6, 6–2, 6–7
Win	41–27	Oct 1980	Vienna, Austria	Carpet (i)	(United States) Stan Smith	(Switzerland) Heinz Günthardt (Czechoslovakia) Pavel Složil	6–1, 6–2
Loss	41–28	Nov 1980	Stockholm, Sweden	Carpet (i)	(United States) Stan Smith	(Switzerland) Heinz Günthardt (Australia) Paul McNamee	7–6, 3–6, 2–6
Win	42–28	Dec 1980	Johannesburg, South Africa	Hard	(United States) Stan Smith	(Switzerland) Heinz Günthardt (Australia) Paul McNamee	6–7, 6–3, 6–4
Loss	42–29	Jul 1981	Wimbledon, London	Grass	(United States) Stan Smith	(United States) Peter Fleming (United States) John McEnroe	4–6, 4–6, 4–6
Loss	42–30	Aug 1981	Stowe, US	Hard	(United States) Brian Gottfried	(South Africa) Johan Kriek (United States) Larry Stefanki	6–2, 1–6, 2–6
Loss	42–31	Aug 1981	Cincinnati, US	Hard	(United States) Stan Smith	(United States) John McEnroe (United States) Ferdi Taygan	6–7, 3–6
Loss	42–32	Sep 1981	Sawgrass Doubles, US	Hard	(United States) Stan Smith	(Switzerland) Heinz Günthardt (Australia) Peter McNamara	6–7, 6–3, 6–7, 7–5, 4–6
Loss	42–33	Aug 1982	La Costa WCT, US	Hard	(Mexico) Raúl Ramírez	(United States) Fritz Buehning (United States) Johan Kriek	6–3, 6–7, 3–6
Win	43–33	Dec 1982	Hartford WCT, US	Carpet	(United States) Dick Stockton	(United States) Mike Cahill (United States) Tracy Delatte	7–6, 6–3

Source: ATP
