= Roy Barth =

American tennis player (born 1947)

- Full name: Roy Barth
- Country (sports): United States
- Born: March 30, 1947 (age 79) San Diego, California, U.S.
- Turned pro: 1969
- Retired: 1975
- Official website: www.roybarth.com

Singles
- Career record: 29–118
- Career titles: 0

Grand Slam singles results
- Australian Open: 1R (1971)
- French Open: 1R (1970)
- Wimbledon: 1R (1968, 1969, 1970, 1971)
- US Open: 4R (1969)

Doubles
- Career record: 45–94
- Career titles: 1

Grand Slam doubles results
- Australian Open: 1R (1971)
- French Open: 2R (1970)
- Wimbledon: 2R (1969)
- US Open: 3R (1974)

Roy Barth (born March 30, 1947) is a former professional tennis player from the United States.

== Biography ==
Barth, born and raised in San Diego, was a good enough junior tennis player to be selected for America's Junior Davis Cup team. He played varsity tennis while attending UCLA in the late 1960s and had success in doubles with Steve Tidball. The pair were runners-up to Bob Lutz and Stan Smith for the NCAA Division 1 doubles title in 1968. He twice earned All-American honours, in 1968 and 1969.

After coming back from two sets down to defeat Miguel Olvera in the first round of the 1969 US Open, Barth made it to the fourth round, which would remain his best Grand Slam performance. Barth, who reached a highest ranking of 8th nationally, competed in all four Grand Slam tournaments, but all of his nine singles matches won were on home soil.

Competing professionally from 1969, Barth went on to make two Grand Prix finals, both in doubles. He was runner-up in the doubles at the Pacific Coast Championships in 1970, then in 1974 won the Pennsylvania Lawn Tennis Championships in Merion with Humphrey Hose.

A finalist at the Wimbledon All England Plate in 1970, Barth also had noted performances at the US Open in the 1970s. He won the first two sets of his match against Björn Borg at the 1973 US Open, before the Swede came back to win in five. The following year at the 1974 US Open he also took former champion Ilie Năstase to five sets.

In 1975, Barth played on the World Team Tennis Tour as a member of the Indiana Loves.

After retiring from professional tennis, Barth moved to Charleston, South Carolina, to become the Director of Tennis of the new Kiawah Island Golf and Tennis Resort, growing the program to earn the #1 Tennis Resort in the United States ranking by Tennis Magazine and the #1 Tennis Resort in the World twelve times between 2005 and 2019 by tennisresortsonline.com.

In 2006, to celebrate Barth's 30th year of employment, the owners of Kiawah renamed their East Beach Tennis Center the Roy Barth Tennis Center. In 2018, after 42 years as director of the tennis program, Barth stepped down, turning the program over to his son, Jonathan. Barth is currently the Director of Tennis Emeritus and still works with tennis players at Kiawah.

As a volunteer, Barth served as President of the USTA South Carolina District, Captain of the USTA Italia Cup, Chairman of the USTA Davis Cup Committee, and President of the Professional Tennis Registry (PTR).

Barth has been inducted into six Halls of Fame: Hoover High School Sports Hall of Fame in San Diego (1995), The South Carolina Tennis Hall of Fame (1997), The Southern Tennis Hall of Fame (1999), The San Diego Tennis Hall of Fame (2012), The Intercollegiate Tennis Hall of Fame (2019), and the Professional Tennis Registry (PTR) Hall of Fame (2020).

In October 2020, Barth published Point of Impact, his personal story woven though the history of tennis and a series of life lessons. In it, he suggests that tennis lessons are life lessons. He channeled the lessons he learned on the court into tools for managing the challenges he faced off the court. Billie Jean King agrees. "Roy's perspective is right on target," she wrote in the book's foreword.

== Honors ==
- 1965 USTA Boy's 18's Sportsmanship Award
- 1992 PTR Professional of the Year
- 2006 PTR Master Professional
- 2007 USTA Family of the Year
- 2013 PTR International Master Professional
- 2014 USTA Southern—Charlie Morris Service Award
- 2016 USTA Southern—Jacobs Bowl Service Award

== Grand Prix career finals ==
=== Doubles: 2 (1–1) ===
Result	W-L	Date	Tournament	Surface	Partner	Opponents	Score
Loss	0–1	Oct 1970	Berkeley, U. S.	Hard	(United States) Tom Gorman	(United States) Bob Lutz (United States) Stan Smith	2–6, 5–7, 6–4, 2–6
Win	1–1	Aug 1974	Merion, U. S.	Grass	(Venezuela) Humphrey Hose	(United States) Mike Machette (United States) Fred McNair	7–6, 6–2
