= Brian Fairlie =

New Zealand tennis player (born 1948)

- Country (sports): New Zealand
- Born: 13 June 1948 (age 78) Christchurch, New Zealand
- Height: 1.73 m (5 ft 8 in)
- Turned pro: 1968 (amateur from 1966)
- Retired: 1979
- Plays: Right-handed (one-handed backhand)

Singles
- Career record: 187–186 (Open era)
- Career titles: 2

Grand Slam singles results
- Australian Open: 3R (1976)
- French Open: 4R (1977)
- Wimbledon: 3R (1977, 1978)
- US Open: QF (1970)

Doubles
- Career record: 174–156
- Career titles: 4
- Highest ranking: No. 27 (30 August 1977)

Grand Slam doubles results
- Australian Open: QF (1977^{Dec}, 1978)
- French Open: SF (1971)
- Wimbledon: 3R (1969, 1970, 1977)
- US Open: 2R (1972)

Brian Fairlie (born 13 June 1948) is a New Zealand tennis player. During his career from 1968 to 1979, he won four titles in doubles, all with the Egyptian player Ismail El Shafei, and 10 singles titles in the Open era (and at least two more in 1967).

== Playing career ==
=== Juniors ===
Fairlie was the 1967 Boys' Singles champion of the Australian Championships.

=== Professional ===
Fairlie's best result in a Grand Slam was reaching the semi-finals of men's doubles at the French Open in 1971 with partner Frew McMillan. A year earlier, he reached the singles quarterfinals of the U.S. Open, losing to Tony Roche.

While his highest ATP singles ranking was World No. 24 (in September 1973), Fairlie was ranked inside the world's Top 20 in the late 1960s and early 1970s.

In 1969, his first full year on the circuit, he upset former Wimbledon and U.S. Open champion John Newcombe in the quarterfinals of the Heineken Open in Auckland. The tournament's website describes the atmosphere at the event that year: "There was wild excitement in a packed stadium when Kiwi Brian Fairlie pulled off an upset win over Newcombe in five hard-fought sets. When he went on to face Laver, the gates had to be closed against the huge crowds wanting to get in."

In 1972 he won the Midland RC International a WCT event that year. In both 1975 and 1976, Fairlie reached the finals of this tournament, losing on both occasions to fellow New Zealander Onny Parun. Also in 1972 he won the Wellington Open Championships.

In 1976, Fairlie played in an Australian Open match notable for having the 13th oldest combined age in Grand Slam history. His age and the age of Frank Sedgman, his opponent, averaged 37 years, 10 months, and 9 days.

In winning the second of his two singles titles (in Manila, Philippines in 1976), he lost only one set during the entire tournament.

=== Davis Cup ===
From 1966 through 1979, he played in 48 Davis Cup matches for New Zealand, winning 13 in singles and seven in doubles.

=== Team Tennis ===
In 1974, the inaugural year of World Team Tennis, he became a member of the Philadelphia Freedoms; the team posted the league's best record for the year at 39–5.

== Career finals ==
=== Singles: 6 (2 titles / 4 runner-ups) ===
Result	W/L	Date	Tournament	Surface	Opponent	Score
Win	1–0	Jan 1973	London WCT, England	Hard (i)	(United Kingdom) Mark Cox	2–6, 6–2, 6–3, 6–4
Loss	1–1	Feb 1973	Cologne, West Germany	Carpet (i)	(Czechoslovakia) Jan Kodeš	1–6, 3–6, 1–6
Loss	1–2	Jan 1975	Auckland, New Zealand	Grass	(New Zealand) Onny Parun	6–4, 4–6, 4–6, 7–6, 4–6
Loss	1–3	Mar 1975	London, England	Carpet (i)	(United Kingdom) Mark Cox	1–6, 5–7
Loss	1–4	Dec 1975	Auckland, New Zealand	Grass	(New Zealand) Onny Parun	2–6, 3–6, 6–4, 3–6
Win	2–4	Nov 1976	Manila, Philippines	Clay	(Australia) Ray Ruffels	7–5, 6–7, 7–6

=== Doubles: 18 (4 titles / 14 runner-up) ===
Result	W/L	Date	Tournament	Surface	Partner	Opponents	Score
Loss	0–1	Jan 1971	Auckland, New Zealand	Grass	(South Africa) Ray Moore	(Australia) Bob Carmichael (Australia) Ray Ruffels	3–6, 7–6, 4–6, 6–4, 3–6
Loss	0–2	Sep 1972	Los Angeles, U.S.	Hard	(Egypt) Ismail El Shafei	(United States) Pancho Gonzales (United States) Jimmy Connors	3–6, 6–4, 6–7
Loss	0–3	Oct 1972	Alamo WCT, U.S.	Hard	(Egypt) Ismail El Shafei	(Netherlands) Tom Okker (United States) Marty Riessen	6–7, 4–6
Loss	0–4	Nov 1972	Gothenburg, Sweden	Carpet (i)	(Egypt) Ismail El Shafei	(Netherlands) Tom Okker (United States) Marty Riessen	2–6, 6–7
Loss	0–5	Mar 1973	Chicago, U.S.	Carpet (i)	(Egypt) Ismail El Shafei	(Australia) Ken Rosewall (Australia) Fred Stolle	7–6, 4–6, 2–6
Loss	0–6	Apr 1973	Cleveland, U.S.	Carpet (i)	(Egypt) Ismail El Shafei	(Australia) Ken Rosewall (Australia) Fred Stolle	2–6, 3–6
Loss	0–7	Aug 1973	Tanglewood, U.S.	Clay	(Egypt) Ismail El Shafei	(Australia) Bob Carmichael (South Africa) Frew McMillan	3–6, 4–6
Win	1–7	Apr 1974	St. Louis, U.S.	Clay	(Egypt) Ismail El Shafei	(Australia) Geoff Masters (Australia) Ross Case	7–6, 6–7, 7–6
Loss	1–8	Jan 1975	Auckland, New Zealand	Grass	(Australia) Onny Parun	(Australia) Bob Carmichael (Australia) Ray Ruffels	6–7, ret.
Loss	1–9	Apr 1975	Charlotte, US	Clay	(Egypt) Ismail El Shafei	(Chile) Patricio Cornejo (Chile) Jaime Fillol	3–6, 7–5, 4–6
Loss	1–10	Mar 1976	Mexico City, Mexico	Clay	(Egypt) Ismail El Shafei	(United States) Brian Gottfried (Mexico) Raúl Ramírez	4–6, 6–7
Loss	1–11	Oct 1976	Brisbane, Australia	Grass	(Egypt) Ismail El Shafei	(Australia) Syd Ball (Australia) Kim Warwick	4–6, 4–6
Win	2–11	Oct 1976	Sydney, Australia	Hard (i)	(Egypt) Ismail El Shafei	(Australia) Syd Ball (Australia) Kim Warwick	7–5, 6–7, 7–6
Loss	2–12	Nov 1976	Tokyo, Japan	Clay	(Egypt) Ismail El Shafei	(Australia) Bob Carmichael (Australia) Ken Rosewall	4–6, 4–6
Win	3–12	Jul 1977	Newport, U.S.	Grass	(Egypt) Ismail El Shafei	(United States) Tim Gullikson (United States) Tom Gullikson	6–7, 6–3, 7–6
Win	4–12	Mar 1978	Cairo, Egypt	Clay	(Egypt) Ismail El Shafei	(Argentina) Lito Álvarez (United States) George Hardie	6–3, 7–5, 6–2
Loss	4–13	Jul 1978	Cincinnati, U.S.	Clay	(Egypt) Ismail El Shafei	(United States) Gene Mayer (Mexico) Raúl Ramírez	3–6, 3–6
Loss	4–14	Aug 1978	New Orleans, U.S.	Carpet (i)	(Egypt) Ismail El Shafei	(United States) Erik van Dillen (United States) Dick Stockton	6–7, 3–6
