= 1971 in tennis =

This page covers all the important events in the sport of tennis in 1971. It provides the results of notable tournaments throughout the year on both the men's and the women's tennis circuits.

== Australian Open ==
Category	Champion(s)	Finalist(s)	Score
Men's singles	(Australia) Ken Rosewall	(United States) Arthur Ashe	6–1, 7–5, 6–3
Women's singles	(Australia) Margaret Court	(Australia) Evonne Goolagong	2–6, 7–6, 7–5
Men's doubles	(Australia) John Newcombe (Australia) Tony Roche	(Netherlands) Tom Okker (United States) Marty Riessen	6–2, 7–6
Women's doubles	(Australia) Evonne Goolagong (Australia) Margaret Court	(Australia) Jill Emmerson (Australia) Lesley Hunt	6–0, 6–0

== French Open ==
Category	Champion(s)	Finalist(s)	Score
Men's singles	(Czechoslovakia) Jan Kodeš	(Romania) Ilie Năstase	8–6, 6–2, 2–6, 7–5 (Note: It was Kodeš' 2nd career Grand Slam singles title and his 2nd (consecutive) title at the French Open.)
Women's singles	(Australia) Evonne Goolagong	(Australia) Helen Gourlay	6–3, 7–5 (Note: It was Goolagong's first career Grand Slam singles title.)
Men's doubles	(United States) Arthur Ashe (United States) Marty Riessen	(United States) Tom Gorman (United States) Stan Smith	6–8, 4–6, 6–3, 6–4, 11–9 (Note: It was Ashe's 1st career Grand Slam doubles title and his 1st and only title at the French Open.) (Note: It was Riessen's 1st career Grand Slam doubles title and his 1st and only title at the French Open.)
Women's doubles	(France) Gail Sherriff Chanfreau (France) Françoise Dürr	(Australia) Helen Gourlay (Australia) Kerry Harris	6–4, 6–1 (Note: It was Chanfreau's third career Grand Slam doubles title, her second during the Open Era and her third title at the French Open.) (Note: It was Dürr's sixth career Grand Slam doubles title, her fifth during the Open Era and her fifth (consecutive) and last title at the French Open.)
Mixed doubles	(France) Françoise Dürr (France) Jean-Claude Barclay	(United Kingdom) Winnie Shaw (Soviet Union) Toomas Leius	6–2, 6–4 (Note: It was Dürr's 2nd career Grand Slam mixed doubles title and her 2nd title at the French Open.) (Note: It was Barclay's 2nd career Grand Slam mixed doubles title and his 2nd title at the French Open.)

== Wimbledon ==
Category	Champion(s)	Finalist(s)	Score
Men's singles	(Australia) John Newcombe	(United States) Stan Smith	6–3, 5–7, 2–6, 6–4, 6–4 (Note: It was Newcombe's 4th career Grand Slam title (his 2nd in the Open Era), and his 3rd (and last) Wimbledon title.)
Women's singles	(Australia) Evonne Goolagong	(Australia) Margaret Court	6–4, 6–1 (Note: It was Goolagong's 2nd career Grand Slam title, and her 1st Wimbledon title.)
Men's doubles	(Australia) 'Roy Emerson (Australia) Rod Laver	(United States) Arthur Ashe (United States) Dennis Ralston	4–6, 9–7, 6–8, 6–4, 6–4
Women's doubles	(United States) Rosie Casals (United States) Billie Jean King	(Australia) Margaret Court (Australia) Evonne Goolagong	6–3, 6–2
Mixed doubles	(Australia) Owen Davidson (United States) Billie Jean King	(United States) Marty Riessen (Australia) Margaret Court	3–6, 6–2, 15–13

== US Open ==
Category	Champion(s)	Finalist(s)	Score
Men's singles	(United States) Stan Smith	(Czechoslovakia) Jan Kodeš	3–6, 6–3, 6–2, 7–6^{(5–3)} (Note: It was Smith's 1st career Grand Slam singles title and his 1st and only at the US Open.)
Women's singles	(United States) Billie Jean King	(United States) Rosemary Casals	6–4, 7–6 (Note: It was King's 6th career Grand Slam singles title, her 2nd during the Open Era and her 2nd at the US Open.)
Men's doubles	(Australia) John Newcombe (United Kingdom) Roger Taylor	(United States) Stan Smith (United States) Erik van Dillen	6–7, 6–3, 7–6, 4–6, [5-3] (Note: It was Newcombe's 12th career Grand Slam doubles title, his 6th during the Open Era and his 2nd US Open and 1st of the open era.) (Note: It was Taylor's 1st career Grand Slam doubles title.)
Women's doubles	(United States) Rosemary Casals (Australia) Judy Tegart Dalton	(France) Gail Chanfreau (France) Françoise Dürr	6–3, 6–3 (Note: It was Casals' 6th career Grand Slam doubles title, her 4th during the Open Era and her 2nd at the US Open.) (Note: It was Tegart Dalton's 8th and last career Grand Slam doubles title, her 5th during the Open Era and her 2nd at the US Open.)
Mixed doubles	(United States) Billie Jean King (Australia) Owen Davidson	(Netherlands) Betty Stöve (South Africa) Robert Maud	6–3, 7–5
