= List of Australian Open singles finalists during the Open Era =

Australian Open singles finalists
- Location: Melbourne; Australia
- Created: 1969 (58 finals, including 2026)
- Men's most: 11: Novak Djokovic
- Men's most consecutive: 3: Mats Wilander; Ivan Lendl; Novak Djokovic
- Women's most: 8: Serena Williams
- Women's most consecutive: 6: Evonne Goolagong Cawley; Martina Hingis
- Most meetings: Men's (4 times): Djokovic vs. Murray (4–0); Women's (3 times): Navratilova vs. Evert (2–1)
- Official website

The Australian Open is a Grand Slam tennis tournament held annually in Melbourne, Australia at the Melbourne & Olympic Parks grounds. Since 1969, the tournament became open to professionals, so it is now called the Australian Open. The senior men's and women's tournaments are open to any player with a world ranking, although players below number 100 in the world rankings generally have to enter a preliminary qualification tournament or receive a wildcard to gain entry.

The men who have reached the final at least four times in the Open Era are Mats Wilander, Ivan Lendl, Stefan Edberg, Andre Agassi, Roger Federer, Novak Djokovic, Andy Murray, and Rafael Nadal. Wilander reached the final four times, three times while the event was held on grass and once on hard courts. He won the title twice on grass and once on the other surface. Lendl also reached the final four times, once on grass and three times on hard courts. Both of his titles were on the latter surface. Edberg made the final five times, twice on grass and three times on hard courts. Both of his titles were on grass. Agassi was undefeated in his four appearances in the final between 1995 and 2003, which all on hard courts. Federer has reached the final seven times and won the title six times, all on hard courts, which the first three was on Rebound Ace and the last three on Plexicushion surface. Djokovic is a record eleven-time finalist, winning his first ten appearances in the finals. Murray is a five-time finalist, but lost all of those appearances. Nadal reached six finals, winning twice.

The women who have reached the final at least four times in the Open Era are Margaret Court, Evonne Goolagong Cawley, Chris Evert, Martina Navratilova, Steffi Graf, Monica Seles, Martina Hingis, Serena Williams, and Maria Sharapova. Court reached the final and won the title four times between 1969 and 1973. Goolagong Cawley reached the final seven times between 1971 and 1977, winning four titles. Evert reached the final six times between 1974 and 1988, five on grass and once on hard courts. Both of her titles were on grass. All of Navratilova's six finals between 1975 and 1987 were on grass, with her winning three titles. Graf reached five finals, all on hard courts, between 1987 and 1994. She won four of those finals. Seles was undefeated in her four finals between 1991 and 1996, all on hard courts. Hingis reached six consecutive finals on hard courts between 1997 and 2002, winning three times. Williams played eight finals since 2003, all on hard courts, with three on Rebound Ace and the last five finals on Plexicushion. She won her first six finals as well as her eighth. In her four final appearances since 2007, Sharapova won the title in 2008.

== Men ==
During the 58 times that this tournament has been held in the Open Era, 57 men have reached the Australian Open men's singles final. The final has included men from 21 different nationalities. Twelve of the 57 men have been from the United States, and eleven have been from Australia. Other countries well represented include Serbia, Switzerland, Sweden, Spain, Russia, the United Kingdom, South Africa, Germany, France, Czechoslovakia, and Chile.

- * = Champion

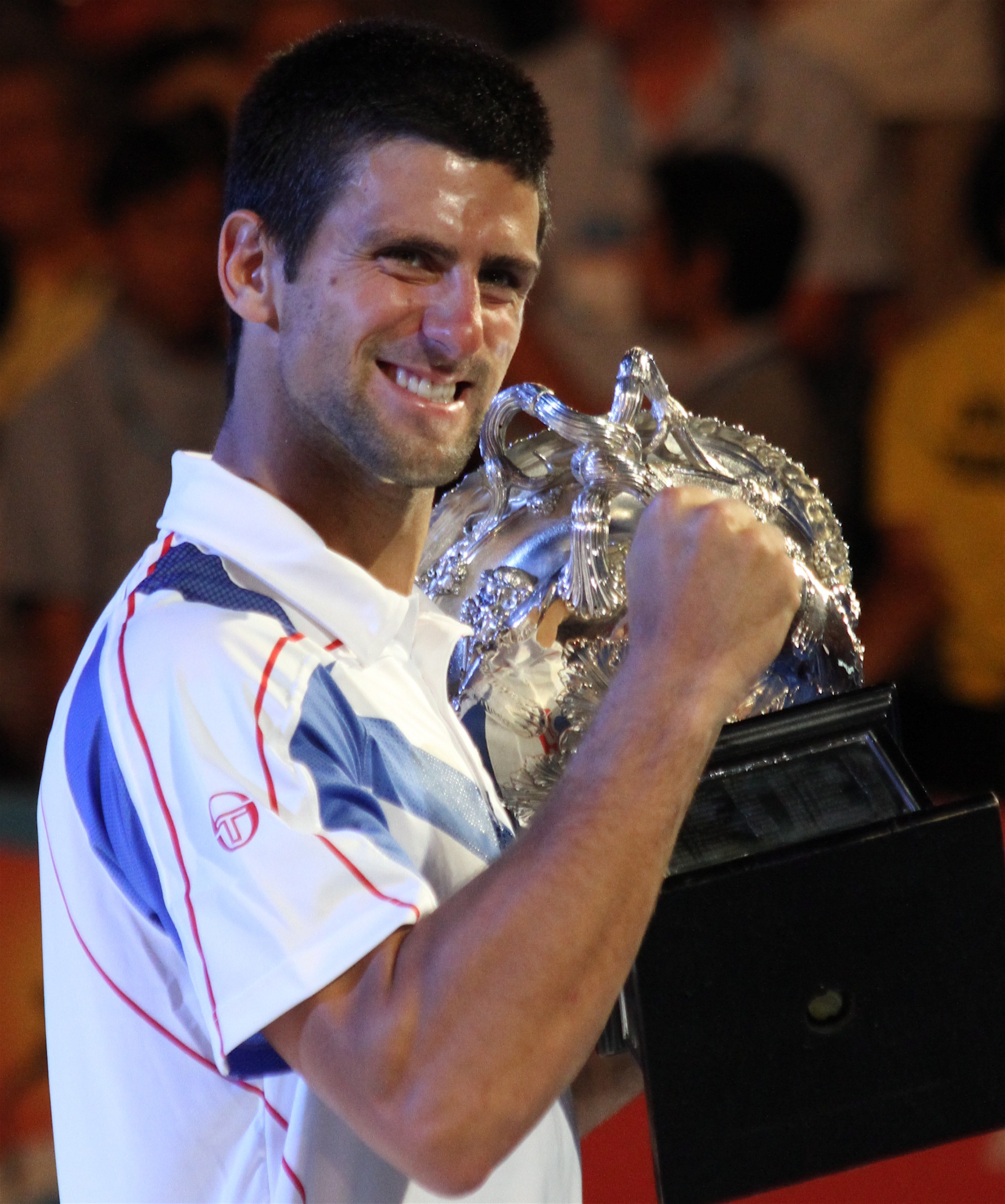
Novak Djokovic, an eleven-time finalist (ten wins).

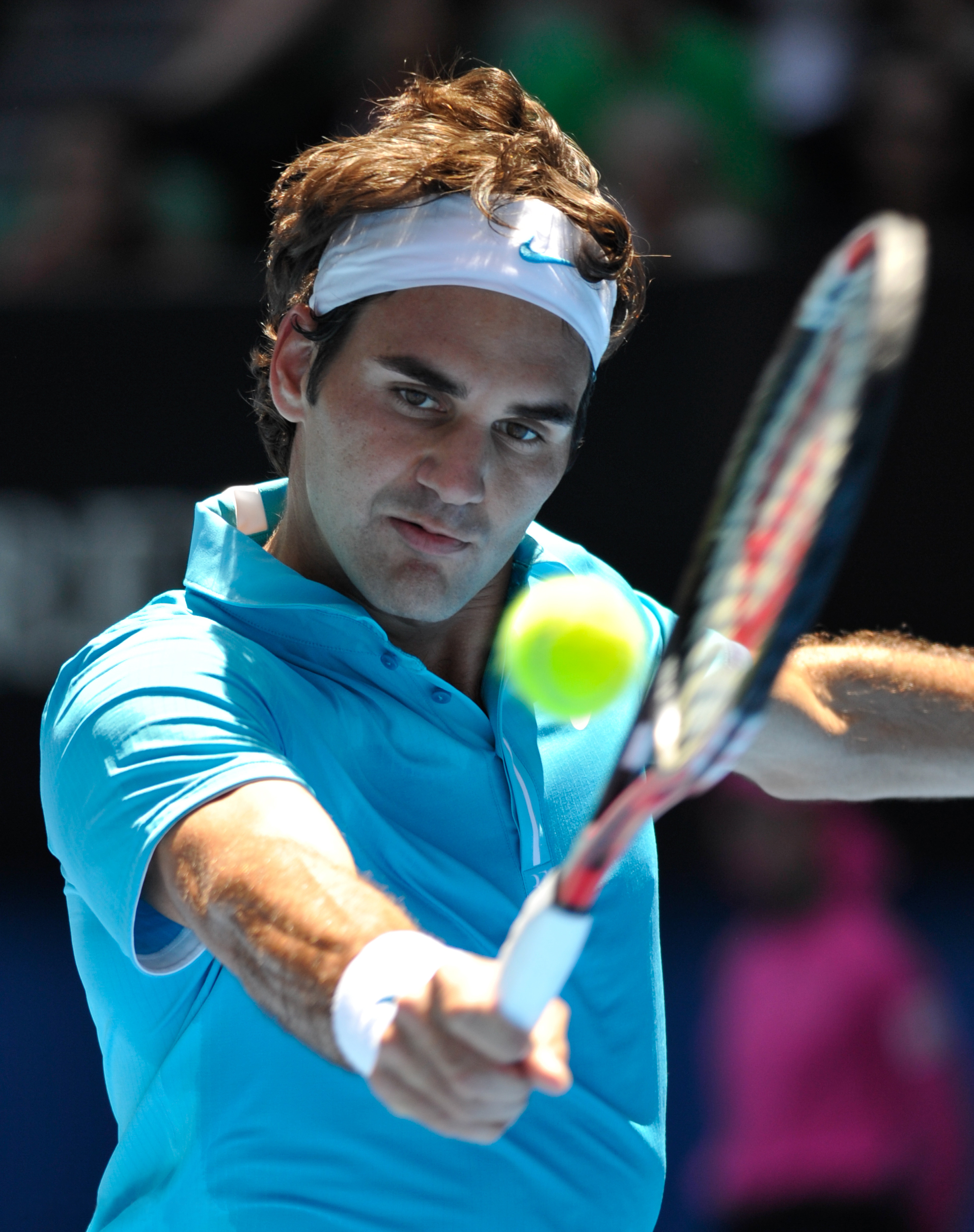
Roger Federer, a seven-time finalist (six wins).

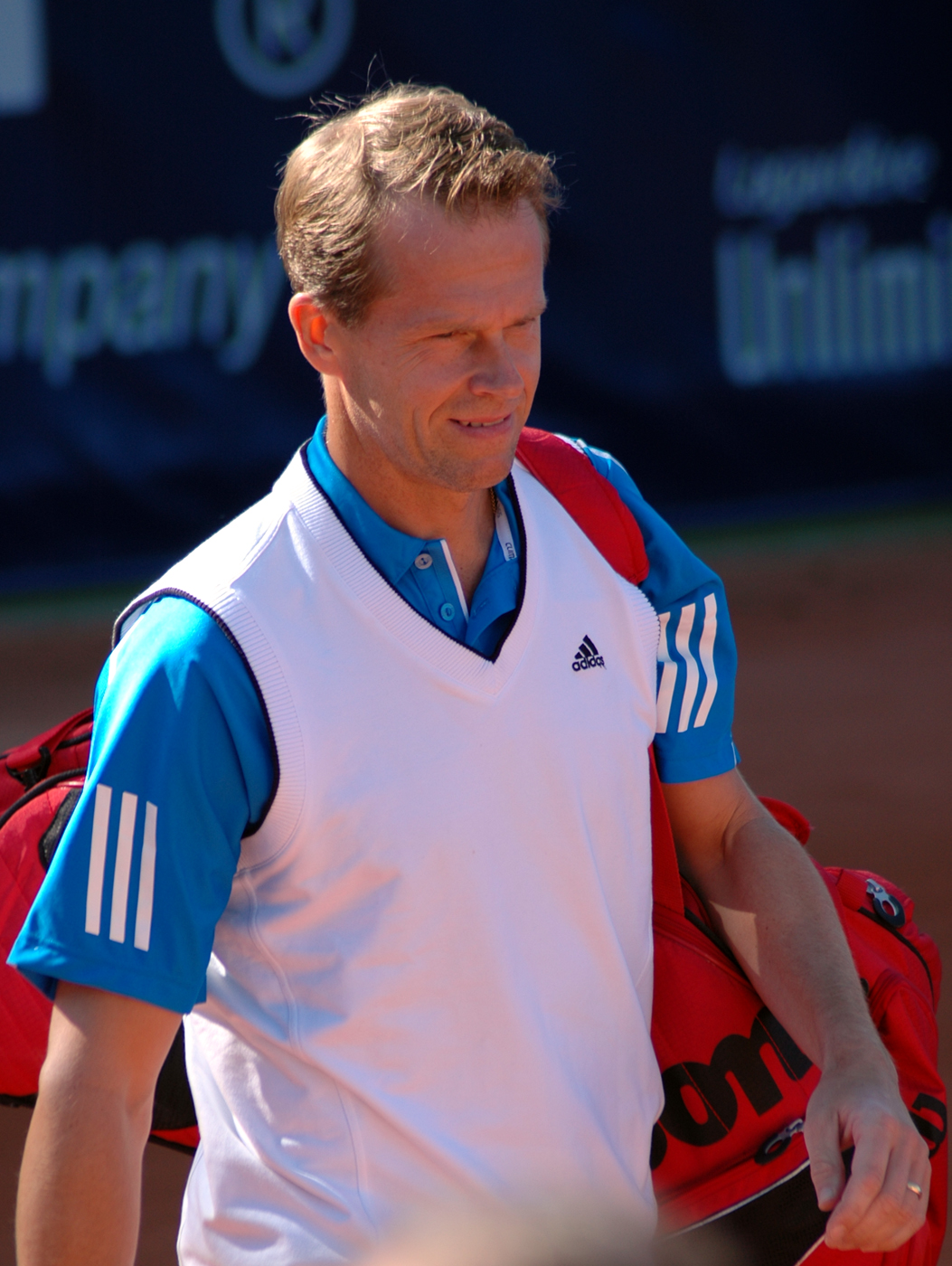
Stefan Edberg, a five-time finalist (two wins).

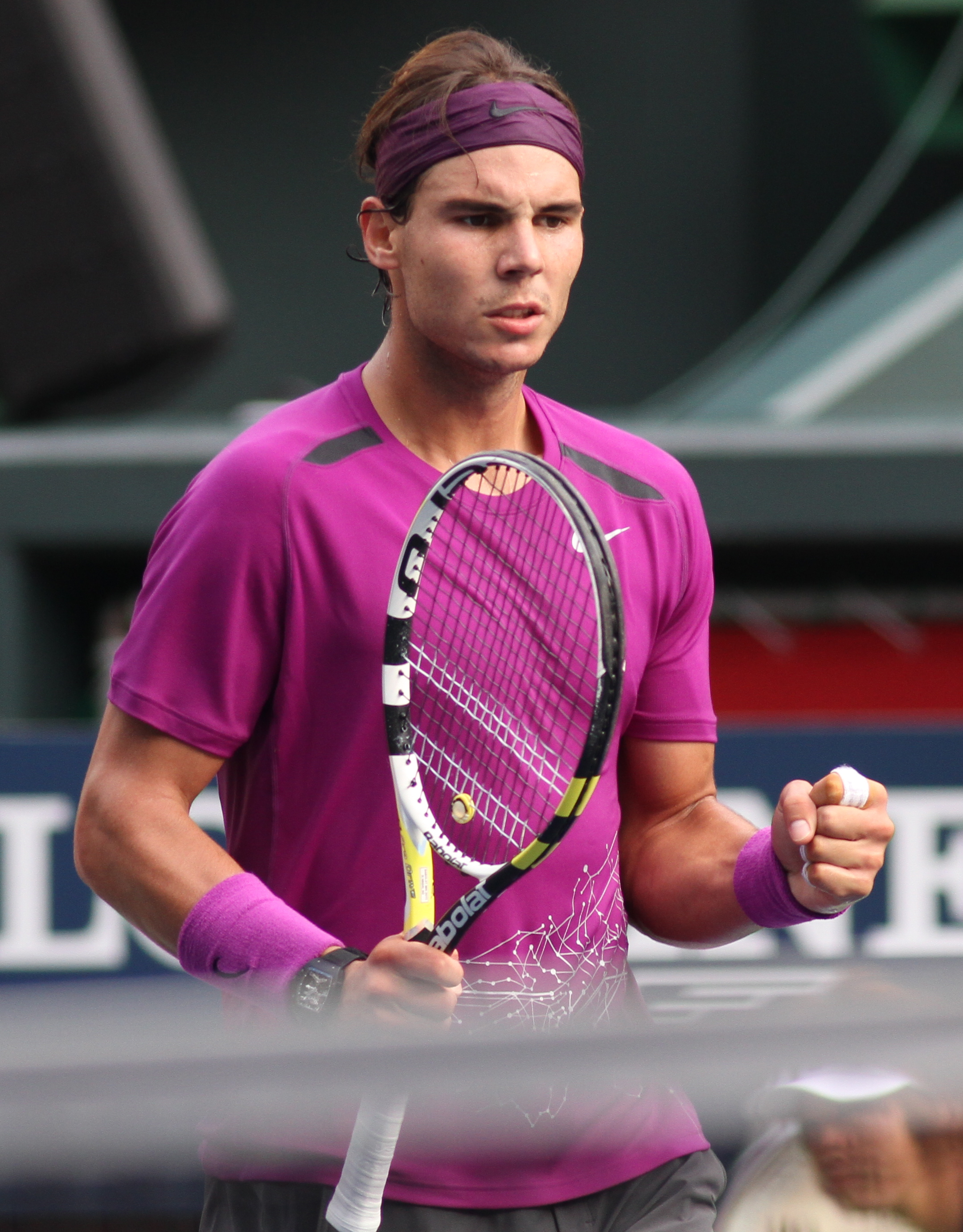
Rafael Nadal, a six-time finalist two wins).

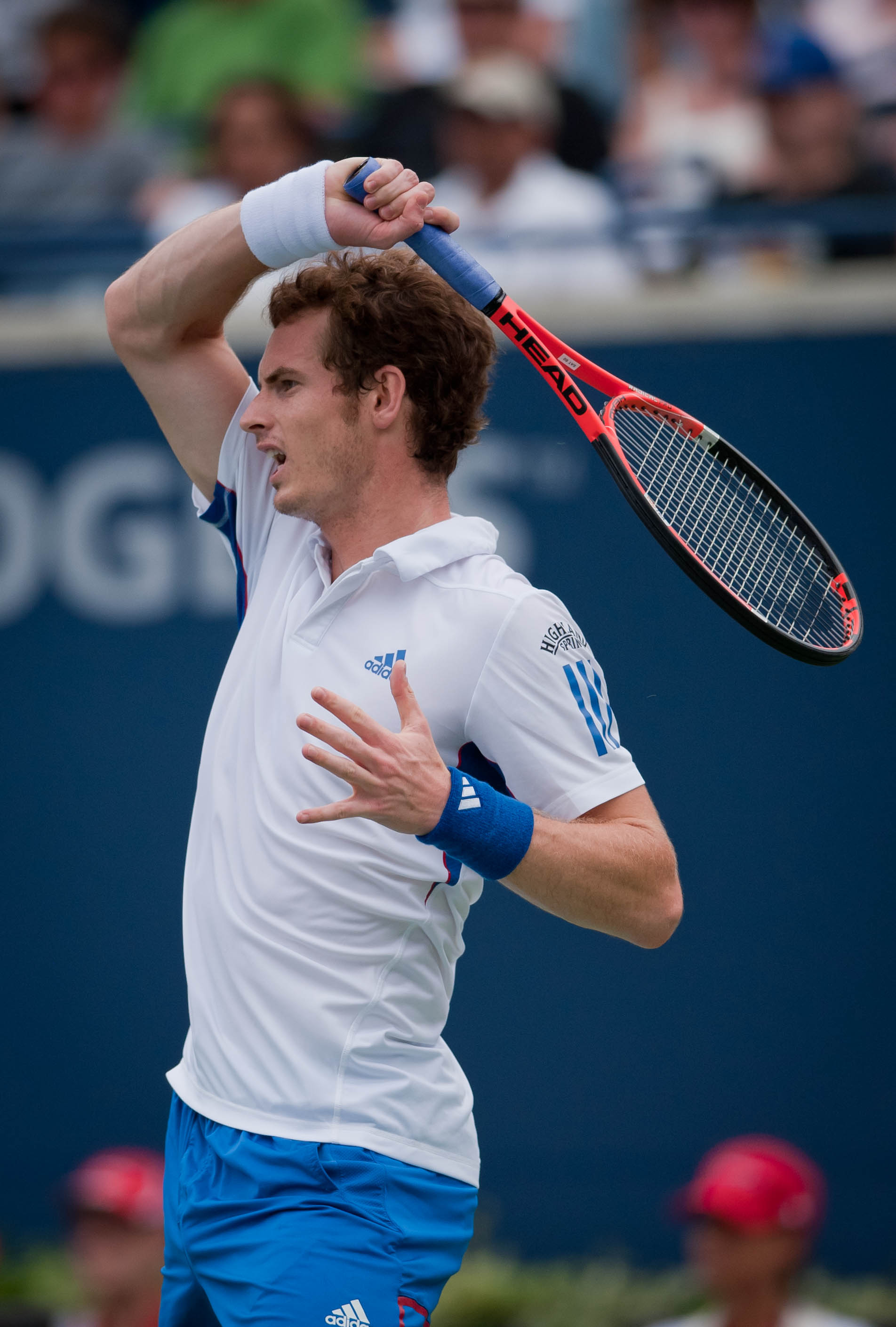
Andy Murray, a five-time finalist (no wins).

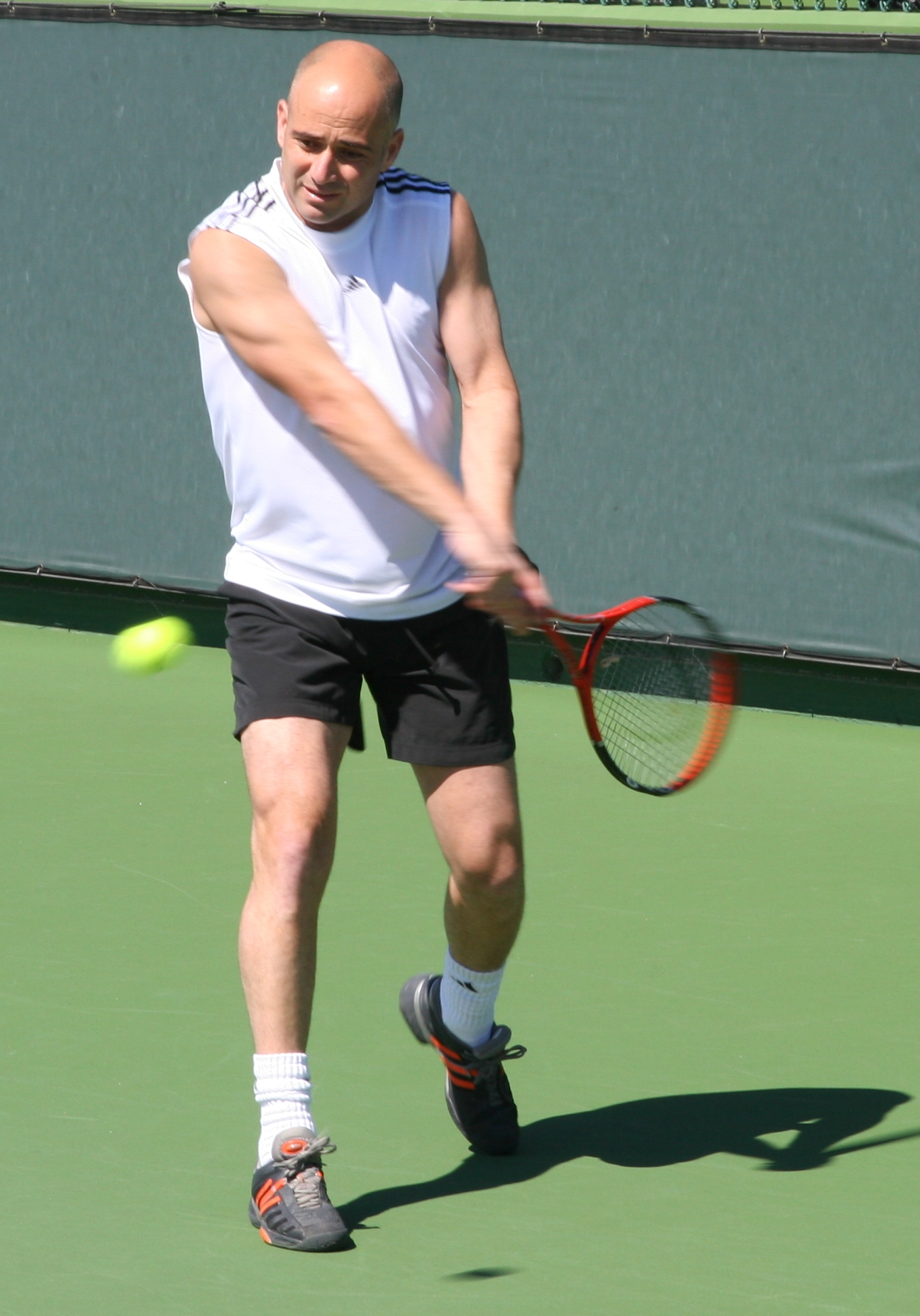
Andre Agassi, a four-time finalist (four wins).

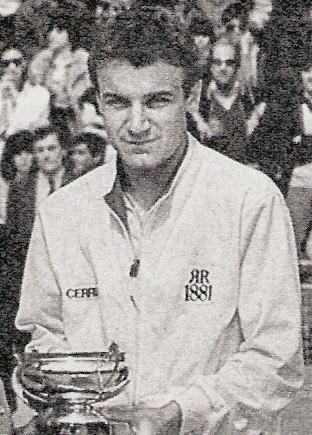
Mats Wilander, a four-time finalist (three wins).

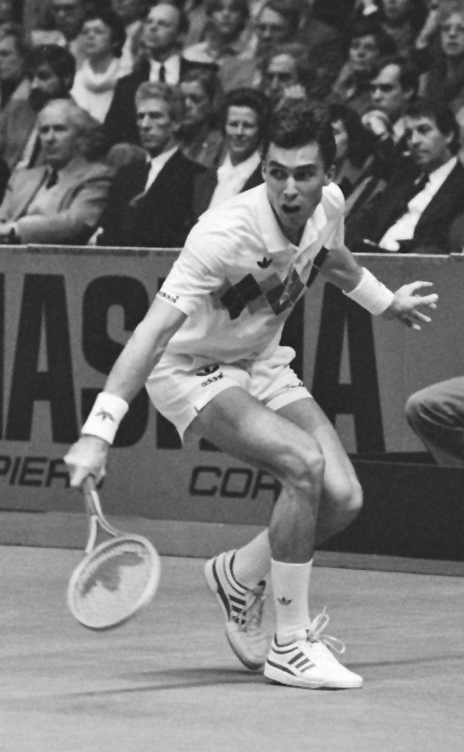
Ivan Lendl, a four-time finalist (two wins).

Country	Player	Finals	Win–Loss	Year(s)
SRB	Novak Djokovic	11	10–1	2008*, 2011*, 2012*, 2013*, 2015*, 2016*, 2019*, 2020*, 2021*, 2023*, 2026
SUI	Roger Federer	7	6–1	2004*, 2006*, 2007*, 2009, 2010*, 2017*, 2018*
ESP	Rafael Nadal	6	2–4	2009*, 2012, 2014, 2017, 2019, 2022*
SWE	Stefan Edberg	5	2–3	1985*, 1987*, 1990, 1992, 1993
GBR	Andy Murray	5	0–5	2010, 2011, 2013, 2015, 2016
USA	Andre Agassi	4	4–0	1995*, 2000*, 2001*, 2003*
SWE	Mats Wilander	4	3–1	1983*, 1984*, 1985, 1988*
CZS	Ivan Lendl	4	2–2	1983, 1989*, 1990*, 1991
AUS	John Newcombe	3	2–1	1973*, 1975*, 1976
ARG	Guillermo Vilas	3	2–1	1977(Jan), 1978*, 1979*
USA	Pete Sampras	3	2–1	1994*, 1995, 1997*
RUS	Marat Safin	3	1–2	2002, 2004, 2005*
RUS	Daniil Medvedev	3	0–3	2021, 2022, 2024
AUS	Ken Rosewall	2	2–0	1971*, 1972*
RSA^{[a]} USA	Johan Kriek	2	2–0	1981*, 1982*
GER	Boris Becker	2	2–0	1991*, 1996*
USA	Jim Courier	2	2–0	1992*, 1993*
ITA	Jannik Sinner	2	2–0	2024*, 2025*
USA	Arthur Ashe	2	1–1	1970*, 1971
USA	Jimmy Connors	2	1–1	1974*, 1975
RUS	Yevgeny Kafelnikov	2	1–1	1999*, 2000
USA	Steve Denton	2	0–2	1981, 1982
AUS	Pat Cash	2	0–2	1987, 1988
AUS	Rod Laver	1	1–0	1969*
AUS	Mark Edmondson	1	1–0	1976*
USA	Roscoe Tanner	1	1–0	1977(Jan)*
USA	Vitas Gerulaitis	1	1–0	1977(Dec)*
USA	Brian Teacher	1	1–0	1980*
CZE	Petr Korda	1	1–0	1998*
SWE	Thomas Johansson	1	1–0	2002*
SUI	Stan Wawrinka	1	1–0	2014*
ESP	Carlos Alcaraz	1	1–0	2026*
ESP	Andrés Gimeno	1	0–1	1969
AUS	Dick Crealy	1	0–1	1970
AUS	Malcolm Anderson	1	0–1	1972
NZL	Onny Parun	1	0–1	1973
AUS	Phil Dent	1	0–1	1974
GBR	John Lloyd	1	0–1	1977(Dec)
AUS	John Marks	1	0–1	1978
USA	John Sadri	1	0–1	1979
AUS	Kim Warwick	1	0–1	1980
RSA	Kevin Curren	1	0–1	1984
CZS	Miloslav Mečíř	1	0–1	1989
USA	Todd Martin	1	0–1	1994
USA	Michael Chang	1	0–1	1996
ESP	Carlos Moyá	1	0–1	1997
CHI	Marcelo Ríos	1	0–1	1998
SWE	Thomas Enqvist	1	0–1	1999
FRA	Arnaud Clément	1	0–1	2001
GER	Rainer Schüttler	1	0–1	2003
AUS	Lleyton Hewitt	1	0–1	2005
CYP	Marcos Baghdatis	1	0–1	2006
CHI	Fernando González	1	0–1	2007
FRA	Jo-Wilfried Tsonga	1	0–1	2008
CRO	Marin Čilić	1	0–1	2018
AUT	Dominic Thiem	1	0–1	2020
GRE	Stefanos Tsitsipas	1	0–1	2023
GER	Alexander Zverev	1	0–1	2025

=== Most recent final ===
Year	Country	Champion	Country	Runner-up
2026	ESP	Carlos Alcaraz	SRB	Novak Djokovic

=== Multiple-time opponents in the Open Era ===
In 2016, Novak Djokovic and Andy Murray reached the same final for an unprecedented fourth time in six years; no other pair of players have contested more than two Australian Open finals in the Open era, and only the four finals between Roger Federer and Rafael Nadal at the French Open matches the record in any of the other Slams during the Open Era, and like Djokovic, Nadal won all 4 finals.

Opponents		Record	Finals meetings
(South Africa) / (United States) **Johan Kriek**	(United States) Steve Denton	2–0	1981, 1982
(United States) **Jim Courier**	(Sweden) Stefan Edberg	2–0	1992, 1993
(Switzerland) Roger Federer	(Spain) Rafael Nadal	1–1	2009 (Nadal), 2017 (Federer)
(Serbia) **Novak Djokovic**	(United Kingdom) Andy Murray	4–0	2011, 2013, 2015, 2016
(Serbia) **Novak Djokovic**	(Spain) Rafael Nadal	2–0	2012, 2019

=== Most consecutive finals in the Open Era ===
Player	Number	Years	Results	
Player	Number	Years	Won	Lost
(Sweden) Mats Wilander	3	1983–85	2	1
(Czechoslovakia) Ivan Lendl	3	1989–91	2	1
(Serbia) Novak Djokovic	3	2011–13	3	0
(Serbia) Novak Djokovic	3	2019–21	3	0
(United States) Arthur Ashe	2	1970–71	1	1
(Australia) Ken Rosewall	2	1971–72	2	0
(United States) Jimmy Connors	2	1974–75	1	1
(Australia) John Newcombe	2	1975–76	1	1
(Argentina) Guillermo Vilas	2	1978–79	2	0
(South Africa) / (United States) Johan Kriek	2	1981–82	2	0
(United States) Steve Denton	2	1981–82	0	2
(Sweden) Stefan Edberg	2	1985–87	2	0
(Australia) Pat Cash	2	1987–88	0	2
(United States) Jim Courier	2	1992–93	2	0
(Sweden) Stefan Edberg	2	1992–93	0	2
(United States) Pete Sampras	2	1994–95	1	1
(Russia) Yevgeny Kafelnikov	2	1999–2000	1	1
(United States) Andre Agassi	2	2000–01	2	0
(Switzerland) Roger Federer	2	2006–07	2	0
(Switzerland) Roger Federer	2	2009–10	1	1
(United Kingdom) Andy Murray	2	2010–11	0	2
(Serbia) Novak Djokovic	2	2015–16	2	0
(United Kingdom) Andy Murray	2	2015–16	0	2
(Switzerland) Roger Federer	2	2017–18	2	0
(Russia) Daniil Medvedev	2	2021–22	0	2
(Italy) Jannik Sinner	2	2024–25	2	0

Bolded years^ indicates active or current streak

== Women ==
During the 58 times that this tournament has been held in the Open Era, 51 women have reached the Australian Open women's singles final. The final has included women from 20 different nationalities. Fifteen of the 48 women have been from the United States, and seven have been from Australia. Other countries well represented include Germany, Czechoslovakia, France, Russia, Spain, Belgium, China, and Belarus.

- * = Champion

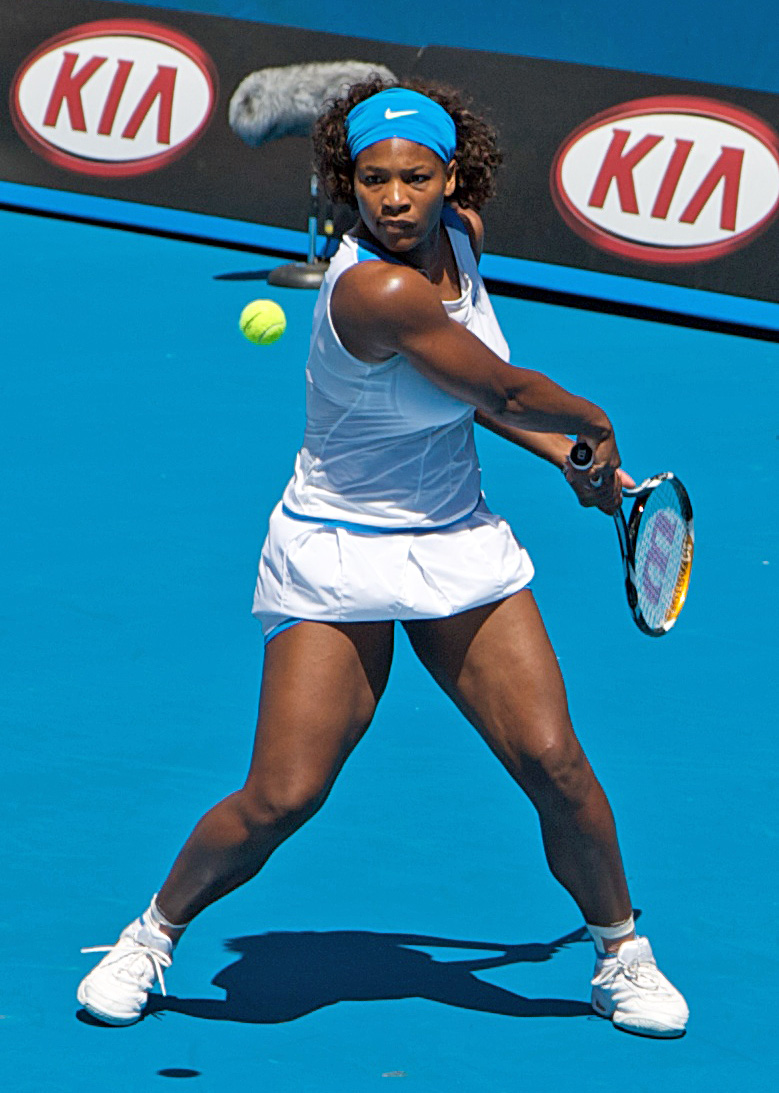
Serena Williams, an eight-time finalist (seven wins).

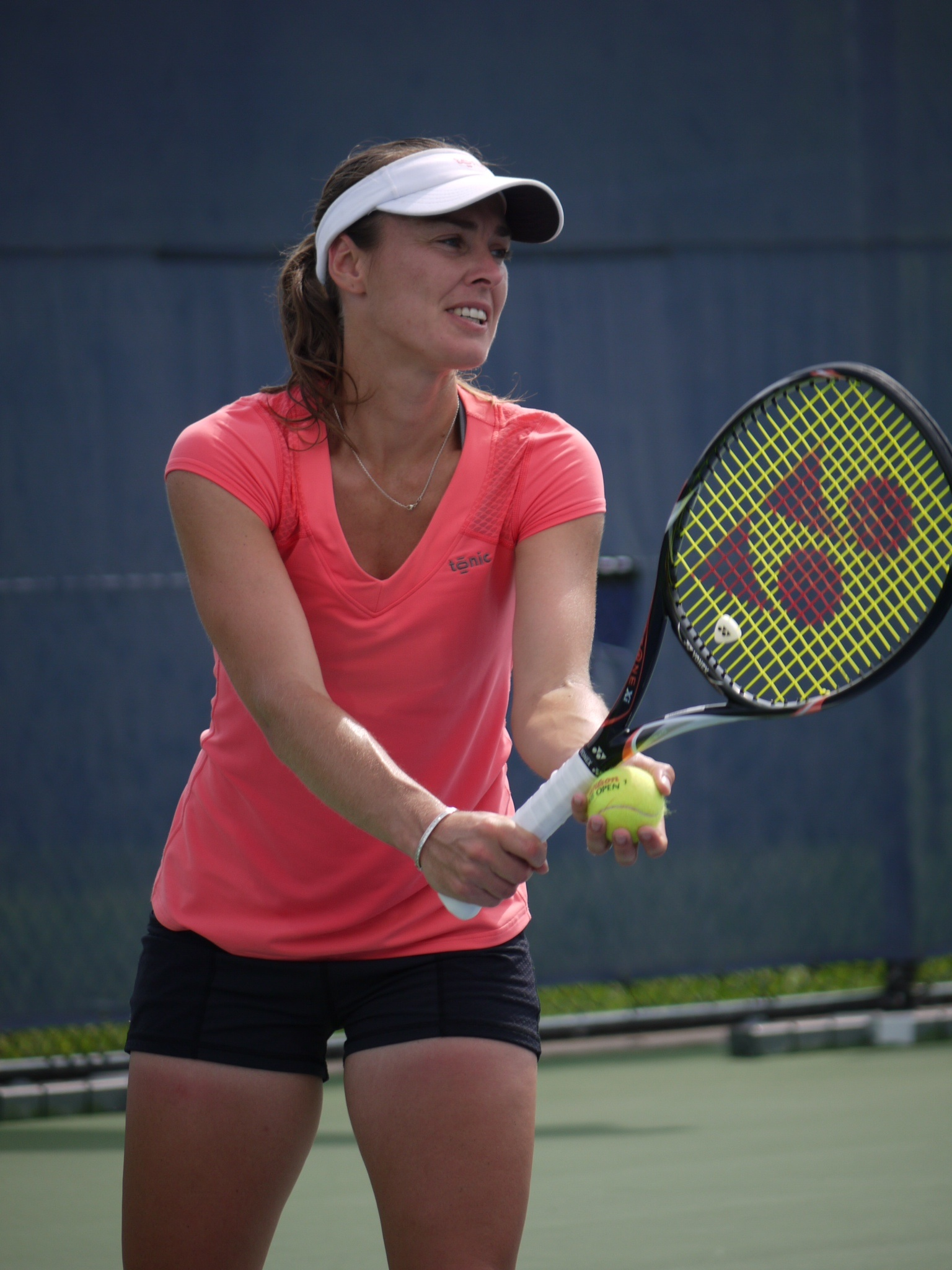
Martina Hingis, a six-time finalist (three wins).

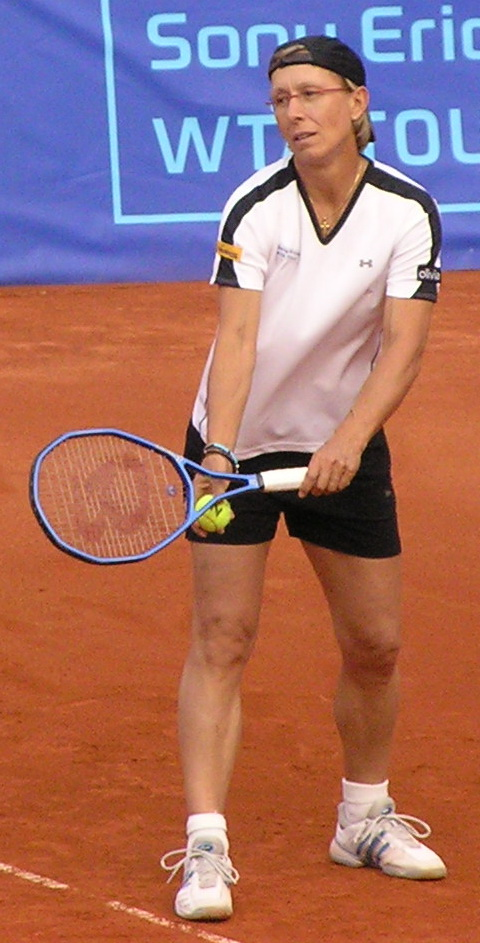
Martina Navratilova, a six-time finalist (three wins).

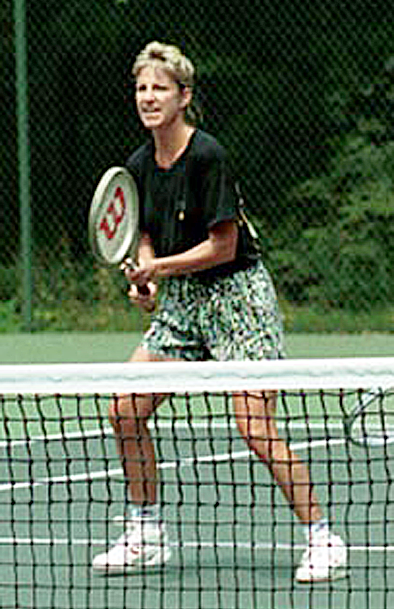
Chris Evert, a six-time finalist (two wins).

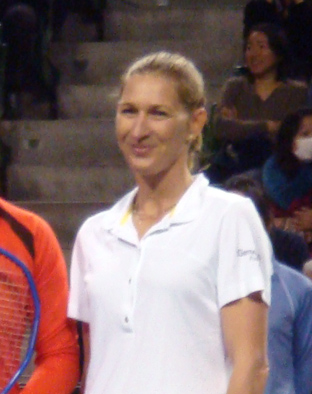
Steffi Graf, a five-time finalist (four wins).

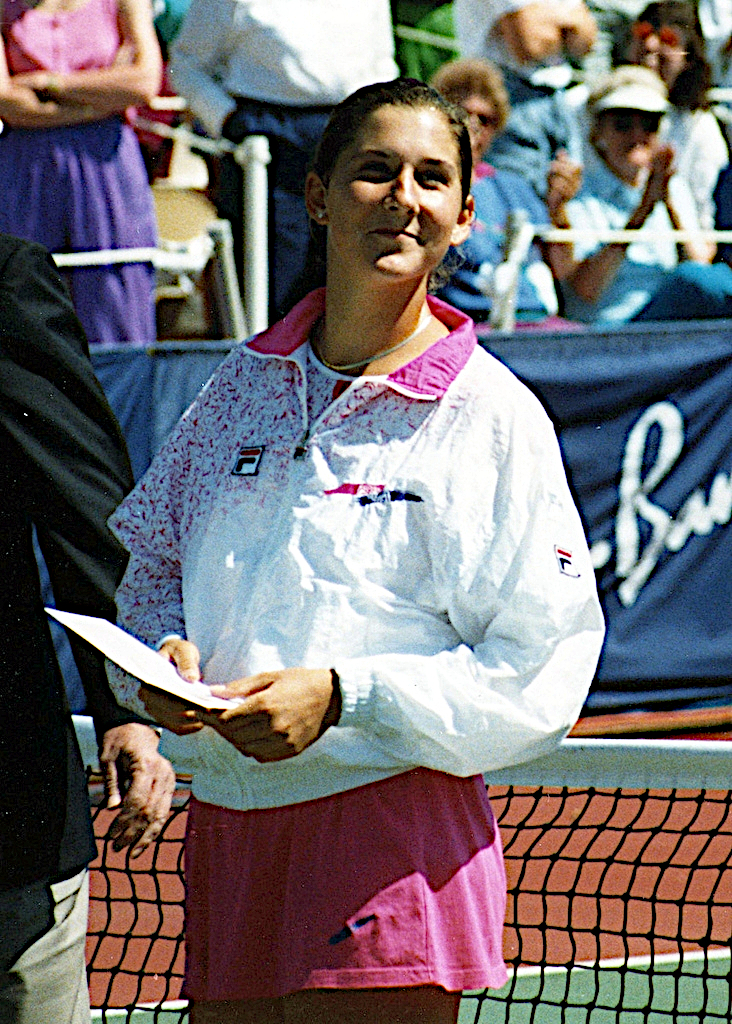
Monica Seles, a four-time finalist (four wins).

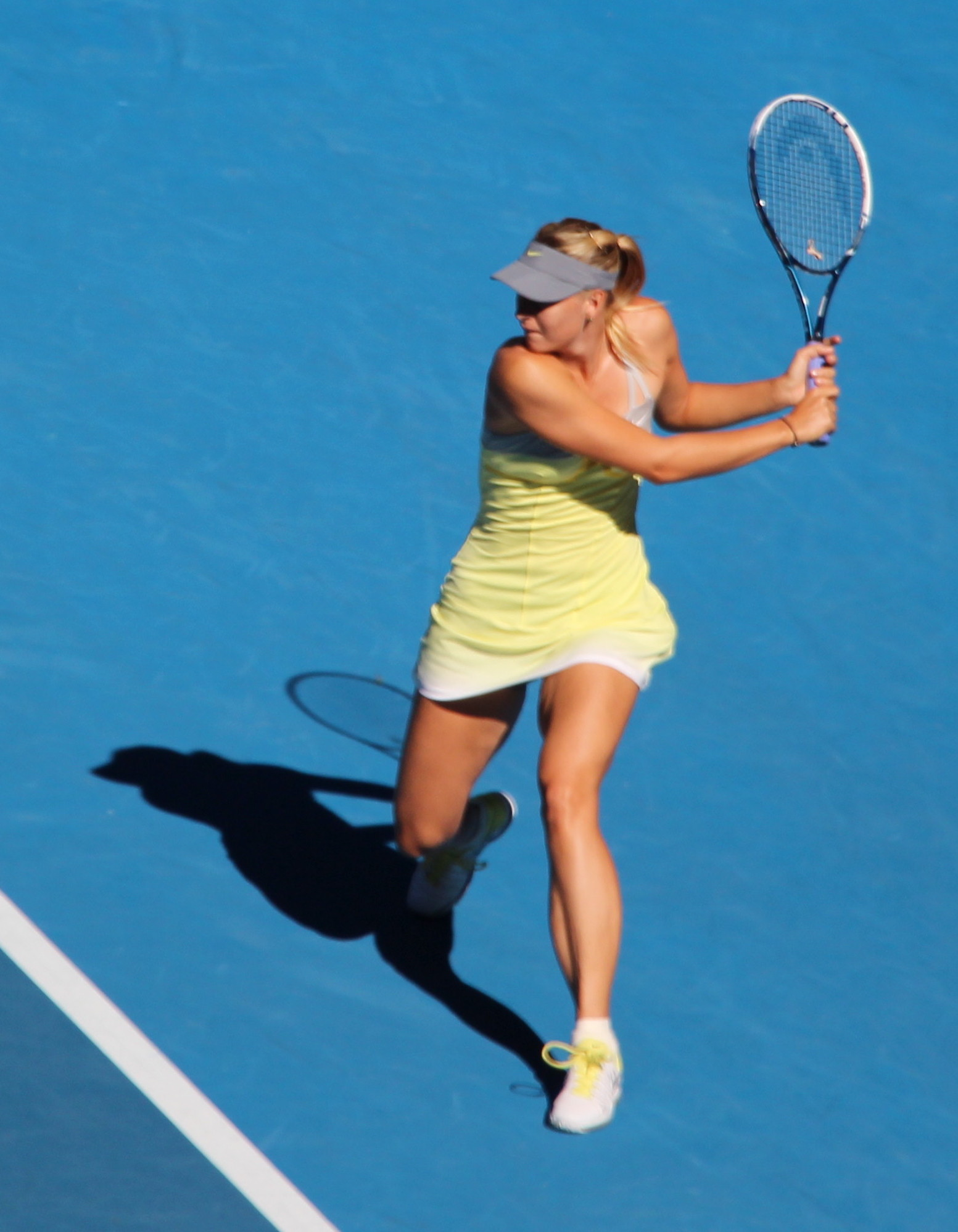
Maria Sharapova, a four-time finalist (one win).

Country	Player	Finals	Win–Loss	Year(s)
USA	Serena Williams	8	7–1	2003*, 2005*, 2007*, 2009*, 2010*, 2015*, 2016, 2017*
AUS	Evonne Goolagong Cawley	7	4–3	1971, 1972, 1973, 1974*, 1975*, 1976*, 1977(Dec)*
USA ^{[b]}	Martina Navratilova	6	3–3	1975, 1981*, 1982, 1983*, 1985*, 1987
SUI	Martina Hingis	6	3–3	1997*, 1998*, 1999*, 2000, 2001, 2002
USA	Chris Evert	6	2–4	1974, 1981, 1982*, 1984*, 1985, 1988
GER	Steffi Graf	5	4–1	1988*, 1989*, 1990*, 1993, 1994*
AUS	Margaret Court	4	4–0	1969*, 1970*, 1971*, 1973*
YUG; USA^{[c]}	Monica Seles	4	4–0	1991*, 1992*, 1993*, 1996*
BLR	Aryna Sabalenka	4	2–2	2023*, 2024*, 2025, 2026
RUS	Maria Sharapova	4	1–3	2007, 2008*, 2012, 2015
BEL	Justine Henin	3	1–2	2004*, 2006, 2010
CHN	Li Na	3	1–2	2011, 2013, 2014*
CZS	Hana Mandliková	2	2–0	1980*, 1987*
USA	Jennifer Capriati	2	2–0	2001*, 2002*
BLR	Victoria Azarenka	2	2–0	2012*, 2013*
JPN	Naomi Osaka	2	2–0	2019*, 2021*
AUS	Kerry Melville Reid	2	1–1	1970, 1977(Jan)*
FRA	Mary Pierce	2	1–1	1995*, 1997
FRA	Amélie Mauresmo	2	1–1	1999, 2006*
USA	Lindsay Davenport	2	1–1	2000*, 2005
BEL	Kim Clijsters	2	1–1	2004, 2011*
KAZ	Elena Rybakina	2	1–1	2023, 2026*
CZS	Helena Suková	2	0–2	1984, 1989
USA	Mary Joe Fernández	2	0–2	1990, 1992
ESP	Arantxa Sánchez Vicario	2	0–2	1994, 1995
USA	Venus Williams	2	0–2	2003, 2017
UK	Virginia Wade	1	1–0	1972*
AUS	Chris O'Neil	1	1–0	1978*
USA	Barbara Jordan	1	1–0	1979*
GER	Angelique Kerber	1	1–0	2016*
DEN	Caroline Wozniacki	1	1–0	2018*
USA	Sofia Kenin	1	1–0	2020*
AUS	Ashleigh Barty	1	1–0	2022*
USA	Madison Keys	1	1–0	2025*
USA	Billie Jean King	1	0–1	1969
GER	Renáta Tomanová	1	0–1	1976
AUS	Dianne Fromholtz Balestrat	1	0–1	1977(Jan)
AUS	Helen Gourlay Cawley	1	0–1	1977(Dec)
USA	Betsy Nagelsen	1	0–1	1978
USA	Sharon Walsh	1	0–1	1979
AUS	Wendy Turnbull	1	0–1	1980
USA	Kathy Jordan	1	0–1	1983
CZS	Jana Novotná	1	0–1	1991
GER	Anke Huber	1	0–1	1996
ESP	Conchita Martínez	1	0–1	1998
SRB	Ana Ivanovic	1	0–1	2008
RUS	Dinara Safina	1	0–1	2009
SVK	Dominika Cibulková	1	0–1	2014
ROU	Simona Halep	1	0–1	2018
CZE	Petra Kvitová	1	0–1	2019
ESP	Garbiñe Muguruza	1	0–1	2020
USA	Jennifer Brady	1	0–1	2021
USA	Danielle Collins	1	0–1	2022
CHN	Zheng Qinwen	1	0–1	2024

=== Most recent final ===
Year	Country	Winner	Country	Runner-up
2026	KAZ	Elena Rybakina	BLR	Aryna Sabalenka

=== Multiple-time opponents in the Open Era ===
Opponents		Record	Finals meetings
(United States) **Martina Navratilova**	(United States) Chris Evert	2–1	1981 (Navratilova), 1982 (Evert), 1985 (Navratilova)
(Australia) **Margaret Court**	(Australia) Evonne Goolagong Cawley	2–0	1971, 1973
(United States) **Jennifer Capriati**	(Switzerland) Martina Hingis	2–0	2001, 2002
(United States) **Serena Williams**	(United States) Venus Williams	2–0	2003, 2017
(United States) **Serena Williams**	(Russia) Maria Sharapova	2–0	2007, 2015
(Kazakhstan) **Elena Rybakina**	(Belarus) Aryna Sabalenka	1–1	2023 (Sabalenka), 2026 (Rybakina)

=== Most consecutive finals in the Open Era ===
Player	Number	Years	Results	
Player	Number	Years	Won	Lost
(Australia) Evonne Goolagong Cawley	6	1971–76	3	3
(Switzerland) Martina Hingis	6	1997–2002	3	3
(Belarus) Aryna Sabalenka	4	**2023–26**	3	1
(United States) Martina Navratilova	3	1981–83	2	1
(Germany) Steffi Graf	3	1988–90	3	0
(Australia) Margaret Court	3	1969–71	3	0
(Socialist Federal Republic of Yugoslavia) Monica Seles	3	1991–93	3	0
(United States) Serena Williams	3	2015–17	2	1
(United States) Chris Evert	2	1981–82	1	1
(United States) Chris Evert	2	1984–85	1	1
(United States) Martina Navratilova	2	1985–87	1	1
(Germany) Steffi Graf	2	1993–94	1	1
(Spain) Arantxa Sánchez Vicario	2	1994–95	0	2
(United States) Jennifer Capriati	2	2001–02	2	0
(Russia) Maria Sharapova	2	2007–08	1	1
(United States) Serena Williams	2	2009–10	2	0
(Belarus) Victoria Azarenka	2	2012–13	2	0
(China) Li Na	2	2013–14	1	1

Bolded years^ indicates active or current streak

== See also ==
- List of French Open singles finalists during the Open Era
- List of Wimbledon singles finalists during the Open Era
- List of US Open singles finalists during the Open Era

== Notes ==
- ^{A} Johan Kriek was born in South Africa but became a United States citizen in 1982.
- ^{B} Martina Navratilova was born in Czechoslovakia but lost her citizenship in 1975. She became a United States citizen in 1981. Her Czech citizenship was restored in 2008.
- ^{C} Monica Seles was born in Yugoslavia but became a United States citizen in 1994.
