= 1964 Australian Championships – Women's singles =

Women's singles
- 1964 Australian Championships

Final
- Champion: (Australia) Margaret Smith
- Runner-up: (Australia) Lesley Turner
- Score: 6–3, 6–2

Details
- Draw: 27
- Seeds: 8

Events
Singles	men	women
Doubles	men	women
- Australian Championships

First-seeded Margaret Smith was the four-time defending champion, and successfully defended her title, defeating Lesley Turner 6–3, 6–2 in the final to win the women's singles tennis title at the 1964 Australian Championships.

== Seeds ==
The seeded players are listed below. Margaret Smith is the champion; others show the round in which they were eliminated.

1. (Australia) Margaret Smith(champion)
2. (Australia) Lesley Turner (finalist)
3. (Australia) Jan Lehane (semifinals)
4. (Australia) Robyn Ebbern (semifinals)
5. (Australia) Judy Tegart (quarterfinals)
6. (Australia) Madonna Schacht (quarterfinals)
7. (Australia) Jill Blackman (quarterfinals)
8. (United Kingdom) Rita Bentley (first round)

== Draw ==
=== Key ===
- Q = Qualifier
- WC = Wild card
- LL = Lucky loser
- r = Retired

=== Finals ===
Quarterfinals
1	(Australia) Margaret Smith	4	6	6
6	(Australia) Madonna Schacht	6	1	1
3	(Australia) Jan Lehane	6	6
(Australia) Helen Gourlay	2	0
5	(Australia) Judy Tegart	2	4
4	(Australia) Robyn Ebbern	6	6
7	(Australia) Jill Blackman	1	3
2	(Australia) Lesley Turner	6	6

Semifinals
1	(Australia) Margaret Smith	6	6
3	(Australia) Jan Lehane	4	2
4	(Australia) Robyn Ebbern	3	1
2	(Australia) Lesley Turner	6	6

Finals
1	(Australia) Margaret Smith	6	6
2	(Australia) Lesley Turner	3	2

=== Earlier rounds ===
==== Section 1 ====
First round
(Australia) Hawton	6	6
(Australia) Krantzcke	3	3
6	(Australia) Schacht	6	6
(Australia) Boucaut	0	1
(Australia) Whitely	6	6
(Australia) Sherriff	1	2
(Australia) Melville	6	6
(Australia) Van Haren	2	4
(Australia) Dening	2	6	6
8	(United Kingdom) Bentley	6	1	3
(Australia) Gourlay	3	6	6
(Australia) Starr	6	3	0

Second round
1	(Australia) Smith	6	6
(Australia) Hawton	1	0
6	(Australia) Schacht	6	5	6
(Australia) Whitely	4	7	4
3	(Australia) Lehane	6	6
(Australia) Melville	2	0
(Australia) Dening	4	4
(Australia) Gourlay	6	6

Quarterfinals
1	(Australia) Smith	4	6	6
6	(Australia) Schacht	6	1	1
3	(Australia) Lehane	6	6
(Australia) Gourlay	2	0

Semifinals
1	(Australia) Smith	6	6
3	(Australia) Lehane	4	2

==== Section 2 ====
First round
(Australia) Sherriff	6	6
(Australia) Toyne	1	0
(Australia) Gibson	7	6
(Japan) Miyagi	5	2
(Australia) Jenkins	7	4	6
(Australia) Turner	5	6	3
7	(Australia) Blackman	6	6
(Australia) Bellamy	1	3
(Australia) Kynaston	6	6
(Australia) Eastburn	2	2

Second round
(Australia) Sherriff	3	6	2
5	(Australia) Tegart	6	3	6
(Australia) Gibson	6	6	4
4	(Australia) Ebbern	4	8	6
(Australia) Jenkins	4	2
7	(Australia) Blackman	6	6
(Australia) Kynaston	1	2
2	(Australia) Turner	6	6

Quarterfinals
5	(Australia) Tegart	2	4
4	(Australia) Ebbern	6	6
7	(Australia) Blackman	1	3
2	(Australia) Turner	6	6

Semifinals
4	(Australia) Ebbern	3	1
2	(Australia) Turner	6	6

Preceded by 1963 U.S. National Championships – Women's singles	Grand Slam women's singles	Succeeded by 1964 French Championships – Women's singles
