= 1971 Australian Open =

- Date: 7–14 March 1971
- Edition: 59th
- Category: Grand Slam (ITF) / (WCT)
- Surface: Grass / Outdoor
- Location: Sydney, Australia
- Venue: White City Tennis Club

Champions

Men's singles
- (Australia) Ken Rosewall

Women's singles
- (Australia) Margaret Court

Men's doubles
- (Australia) John Newcombe / (Australia) Tony Roche

Women's doubles
- (Australia) Evonne Goolagong / (Australia) Margaret Court
- Australian Open

The 1971 Australian Open, also known under its sponsored name Dunlop Australian Open, was a tennis tournament played on outdoor grass courts at the White City Stadium in Sydney, New South Wales, Australia from 7 to 14 March. The tournament was originally scheduled to be played in Melbourne but was moved to Sydney on account of a $125,000 sponsorship deal with Dunlop. The tournament date was moved from its regular January slot to March to accommodate scheduling requirements made by the commercial promoters World Championship Tennis and National Tennis League. It was the 59th edition of the Australian Open, the 17th and final one held in Sydney, and the first Grand Slam tournament of the year. The tournament was part of the 1971 World Championship Tennis circuit. The singles titles were won by Australians Ken Rosewall and Margaret Court. The tiebreak was introduced for all sets except the deciding set.

The competition for mixed doubles was not held from 1970 to 1986.

== Seniors ==
=== Men's singles ===
(Australia) Ken Rosewall defeated (United States) Arthur Ashe 6–1, 7–5, 6–3

=== Women's singles ===
(Australia) Margaret Court defeated (Australia) Evonne Goolagong 2–6, 7–6, 7–5

=== Men's doubles ===
(Australia) John Newcombe / (Australia) Tony Roche defeated (Netherlands) Tom Okker / (United States) Marty Riessen 6–2, 7–6

=== Women's doubles ===
(Australia) Evonne Goolagong / (Australia) Margaret Court defeated (Australia) Jill Emmerson / (Australia) Lesley Hunt 6–0, 6–0

Preceded by 1970 US Open	Grand Slams	Succeeded by 1971 French Open
