= Janet Fallis =

Australian tennis player

- Country (sports): Australia

Singles

Grand Slam singles results
- Australian Open: 3R (1974)

Doubles

Grand Slam doubles results
- Australian Open: QF (1971)

Janet Fallis is an Australian former professional tennis player of the 1970s.

Fallis won a girls' doubles title at the 1970 Australian Open partnering Janet Young, with whom she reached the women's doubles quarter-finals of the 1971 Australian Open. She made it to the singles third round in 1974, losing to the top-seeded Chris Evert. Her best result on the WTA Tour was a doubles runner-up finish at the 1974 NSW Open.

== WTA Tour finals ==
=== Doubles (0–1) ===
Result	Date	Tournament	Tier	Surface	Partner	Opponents	Score
Loss	Jan 1974	New South Wales Open	Sydney, Australia	Hard	(Australia) Pam Whytcross	(United States) Ann Kiyomura (Japan) Kazuko Sawamatsu	3–6, 3–6
