= 1971 Australian Open – Women's doubles =

Women's doubles
- 1971 Australian Open

Final
- Champions: (Australia) Evonne Goolagong (Australia) Margaret Court
- Runners-up: (Australia) Jill Emmerson (Australia) Lesley Hunt
- Score: 6–0, 6–0

Details
- Draw: 14
- Seeds: 4

Events
Singles	men	women		boys	girls
Doubles	men	women	mixed	boys	girls
- Australian Open

Evonne Goolagong and Margaret Court defeated Jill Emmerson and Lesley Hunt 6–0, 6–0 in the final to win the women's doubles title at the 1971 Australian Open.

== Seeds ==
The first and second seeds received a bye into the second round.

1. (Australia) Margaret Court / (Australia) Evonne Goolagong (champions)
2. (Australia) Patricia Coleman / (United Kingdom) Winnie Shaw (semifinals)
3. (Australia) Helen Gourlay / (Australia) Kerry Harris (semifinals)
4. (Australia) Jill Emmerson / (Australia) Lesley Hunt (final)

== Draw ==
Key

- Q = Qualifier
- WC = Wild card
- LL = Lucky loser
- Alt = Alternate
- ITF = ITF entry
- PR = Protected ranking
- SR = Special ranking
- SE = Special exempt
- JE = Junior exempt
- JR = Junior Accelerator Programme entrant
- CO = College Accelerator Programme entrant
- NG = Next Gen Accelerator Program entrant
- w/o = Walkover
- r = Retired
- d = Defaulted

First round
(Australia) S O'Connor (Australia) C Sieler	3	0
(Australia) J O'Neill (Australia) C Zeeman	6	6
3	(Australia) H Gourlay (Australia) K Harris	6	6
(Australia) A Coleman (Australia) M Tesch	0	4
(United States) P Hogan (United States) S Walsh	6	6
(Australia) S Hole (Australia) V Lancaster	2	4
(Australia) A Avis (Australia) N Eastburn	3	6	6
(Australia) J Fallis (Australia) J Young	6	4	7
(Australia) P Edwards (Australia) S Walsham	3	1
4	(Australia) J Emmerson (Australia) L Hunt	6	6
(Australia) B Hawcroft (Australia) H Kayser	6	6
(Australia) L Bowrey (Australia) N Marsh	4	4

Quarterfinals
1	(Australia) M Court (Australia) E Goolagong	6	6
(Australia) J O'Neill (Australia) C Zeeman	1	2
3	(Australia) H Gourlay (Australia) K Harris	6	6
(United States) P Hogan (United States) S Walsh	4	3
(Australia) J Fallis (Australia) J Young	3	1
4	(Australia) J Emmerson (Australia) L Hunt	6	6
(Australia) B Hawcroft (Australia) H Kayser	6	5	1
2	(Australia) P Coleman (United Kingdom) W Shaw	3	7	6

Semifinals
1	(Australia) M Court (Australia) E Goolagong	6	7
3	(Australia) H Gourlay (Australia) K Harris	4	5
4	(Australia) J Emmerson (Australia) L Hunt	6	6
2	(Australia) P Coleman (United Kingdom) W Shaw	2	4

Final
1	(Australia) M Court (Australia) E Goolagong	6	6
4	(Australia) J Emmerson (Australia) L Hunt	0	0
