= 1971 Australian Open – Women's singles =

Women's singles
- 1971 Australian Open

Final
- Champion: (Australia) Margaret Court
- Runner-up: (Australia) Evonne Goolagong
- Score: 2–6, 7–6^{(7–0)}, 7–5

Details
- Draw: 30
- Seeds: 8

Events
Singles	men	women		boys	girls
Doubles	men	women	mixed	boys	girls
- Australian Open

Two-time defending champion Margaret Court defeated Evonne Goolagong in the final, 2–6, 7–6^{(7–0)}, 7–5 to win the women's singles tennis title at the 1971 Australian Open. It was her tenth Australian Open singles title, sixth consecutive major singles title, and 21st major singles title overall.

== Seeds ==
The first and second seeds receive a bye into the second round.

1. (Australia) Margaret Court (champion)
2. (Australia) Evonne Goolagong (finalist)
3. (Australia) Lesley Turner Bowrey (withdrew before the tournament began)
4. (France) Gail Chanfreau (first round)
5. (United States) Patti Hogan (second round)
6. (Australia) Kerry Harris (first round)
7. (United Kingdom) Winnie Shaw (semifinals)
8. (Australia) Helen Gourlay (quarterfinals)

== Draw ==
Key

- Q = Qualifier
- WC = Wild card
- LL = Lucky loser
- Alt = Alternate
- ITF = ITF entry
- PR = Protected ranking
- SR = Special ranking
- SE = Special exempt
- JE = Junior exempt
- JR = Junior Accelerator Programme entrant
- CO = College Accelerator Programme entrant
- NG = Next Gen Accelerator Program entrant
- w/o = Walkover
- r = Retired
- d = Defaulted

=== Finals ===
Quarterfinals
1	(Australia) Margaret Court	6	6
8	(Australia) Helen Gourlay	0	4
(Australia) Lesley Hunt	6	6
(Australia) Jan O'Neill	4	4
(Australia) Norma Marsh	0	6
7	(United Kingdom) Winnie Shaw	6	7
(United States) Sharon Walsh	3	4
2	(Australia) Evonne Goolagong	6	6

Semifinals
1	(Australia) Margaret Court	6	6
(Australia) Lesley Hunt	0	3
7	(United Kingdom) Winnie Shaw	6	1
2	(Australia) Evonne Goolagong	7	6

Final
1	(Australia) Margaret Court	2	7	7
2	(Australia) Evonne Goolagong	6	6	5

=== Earlier rounds ===
==== Section 1 ====
First round
(Australia) H Taylor	0	0
(Australia) P Coleman	6	6
(Australia) C Sieler	3	4
(Australia) B Hawcroft	6	6
(Australia) V Lancaster	3	6	1
8	(Australia) H Gourlay	6	3	6
5	(United States) P Hogan	6	6
(Australia) S Walsham	4	2
(Australia) A Avis	3	4
(Australia) L Hunt	6	6
(Australia) J O'Neill	6	6
(Australia) D Fromholtz	3	0
(Australia) N Eastburn
4	(France) G Chanfreau	w/o

Second round
1	(Australia) M Court	6	6
(Australia) P Coleman	1	1
(Australia) B Hawcroft	5	4
8	(Australia) H Gourlay	7	6
5	(United States) P Hogan	3	4
(Australia) L Hunt	6	6
(Australia) J O'Neill	6	6
(Australia) N Eastburn	1	0

Quarterfinals
1	(Australia) M Court	6	6
8	(Australia) H Gourlay	0	4
(Australia) L Hunt	6	6
(Australia) J O'Neill	4	4

Semifinals
1	(Australia) M Court	6	6
(Australia) L Hunt	0	3

==== Section 2 ====
First round
(Australia) J Fallis	7	3	5
(Australia) S Hole	6	6	7
(Australia) M Tesch	1	2
(Australia) N Marsh	6	6
(Australia) C Zeeman	1	1
(Australia) L Bowrey	6	6
(Australia) J Young	1	0
7	(United Kingdom) W Shaw	6	6
6	(Australia) K Harris	3	6
(Australia) P Edwards	6	7
(Australia) A Coleman	2	2
(United States) S Walsh	6	6
(Australia) H Kayser	6	5
(Australia) K Athorne	0	0	r

Second round
(Australia) S Hole	2	3
(Australia) N Marsh	6	6
(Australia) L Bowrey	0	6	4
7	(United Kingdom) W Shaw	6	1	6
(Australia) P Edwards	3	1
(United States) S Walsh	6	6
(Australia) H Kayser	1	1
2	(Australia) E Goolagong	6	6

Quarterfinals
(Australia) N Marsh	0	6
7	(United Kingdom) W Shaw	6	7
(United States) S Walsh	3	4
2	(Australia) E Goolagong	6	6

Semifinals
7	(United Kingdom) W Shaw	6	1
2	(Australia) E Goolagong	7	6

Preceded by 1970 US Open – Women's singles	Grand Slam women's singles	Succeeded by 1971 French Open – Women's singles
