= 1971 Australian Open – Men's doubles =

Men's doubles
- 1971 Australian Open

Final
- Champions: (Australia) John Newcombe (Australia) Tony Roche
- Runners-up: (Netherlands) Tom Okker (United States) Marty Riessen
- Score: 6–2, 7–6

Details
- Draw: 28
- Seeds: 8

Events
Singles	men	women		boys	girls
Doubles	men	women	mixed	boys	girls
- Australian Open

John Newcombe and Tony Roche defeated Tom Okker and Marty Riessen 6–2, 7–6 in the final to win the men's doubles title at the 1971 Australian Open.

== Seeds ==
The top four seeds receive a bye into the second round.

1. (Australia) John Newcombe / (Australia) Tony Roche (champions)
2. (Australia) Roy Emerson / (Australia) Rod Laver (quarterfinals)
3. (Australia) Ken Rosewall / (Australia) Fred Stolle (quarterfinals)
4. (Netherlands) Tom Okker / (United States) Marty Riessen (final)
5. (United States) Arthur Ashe / (United States) Dennis Ralston (semifinals)
6. (Australia) William Bowrey / (Australia) Owen Davidson (quarterfinals)
7. (Spain) Andrés Gimeno / (United Kingdom) Roger Taylor (first round)
8. (South Africa) Cliff Drysdale / (Australia) Greg Perkins (first round)

== Draw ==
Key

- Q = Qualifier
- WC = Wild card
- LL = Lucky loser
- Alt = Alternate
- ITF = ITF entry
- PR = Protected ranking
- SR = Special ranking
- SE = Special exempt
- JE = Junior exempt
- JR = Junior Accelerator Programme entrant
- CO = College Accelerator Programme entrant
- NG = Next Gen Accelerator Program entrant
- w/o = Walkover
- r = Retired
- d = Defaulted

=== Finals ===
Semifinals
1	(Australia) John Newcombe (Australia) Tony Roche	6	6
5	(United States) Arthur Ashe (United States) Dennis Ralston	4	3
4	(Netherlands) Tom Okker (United States) Marty Riessen	7	7
(United States) Robert Lutz (United States) Charlie Pasarell	6	6

Final
1	(Australia) John Newcombe (Australia) Tony Roche	6	7
4	(Netherlands) Tom Okker (United States) Marty Riessen	2	6

=== Section 1 ===
First round
(Australia) G Pollard (Australia) R Wilson	6	3	6
(South Africa) R Maud (South Africa) F McMillan	3	6	3
(Australia) J Cooper (Australia) C Dibley	6	6
(United Kingdom) J Feaver (Australia) E McCabe	1	4
(Australia) P Doerner (Australia) B Phillips-Moore	6	6
8	(South Africa) C Drysdale (Australia) G Perkins	2	4
5	(United States) A Ashe (United States) D Ralston	6	6
(Australia) A Shapter (Australia) C Stubs	2	4
(Australia) B Carmichael (Australia) R Ruffels	3	5
(Australia) J Alexander (Australia) P Dent	6	7
(Australia) R Case (Australia) G Masters	6	6
(Australia) A Gardiner (United States) J Ward	2	2

Second round
1	(Australia) J Newcombe (Australia) T Roche	6	6	6
(Australia) G Pollard (Australia) R Wilson	7	2	2
(Australia) J Cooper (Australia) C Dibley	6	6
(Australia) P Doerner (Australia) B Phillips-Moore	7	7
5	(United States) A Ashe (United States) D Ralston	7	6
(Australia) J Alexander (Australia) P Dent	5	4
(Australia) R Case (Australia) G Masters	2	1
3	(Australia) K Rosewall (Australia) F Stolle	6	6

Quarterfinals
1	(Australia) J Newcombe (Australia) T Roche	6	6
(Australia) P Doerner (Australia) B Phillips-Moore	1	3
5	(United States) A Ashe (United States) D Ralston	7	7
3	(Australia) K Rosewall (Australia) F Stolle	6	5

Semifinals
1	(Australia) J Newcombe (Australia) T Roche	6	6
5	(United States) A Ashe (United States) D Ralston	4	3

=== Section 2 ===
First round
(Australia) M Anderson (South Africa) R Moore	4	5
(Egypt) I El Shafei (New Zealand) B Fairlie	6	7
(Australia) S Ball (Australia) B Giltinan	6	4	6
(United States) R Barth (Denmark) T Ulrich	3	6	3
(Australia) W Wright (United States) J Zwieg	w/o
6	(Australia) W Bowrey (Australia) O Davidson
7	(Spain) A Gimeno (United Kingdom) R Taylor	3	4
(Australia) D Crealy (Australia) A Stone	6	6
(Australia) G Thomson (Australia) K Warwick	4	1
(United States) R Lutz (United States) C Pasarell	6	6
(United Kingdom) M Cox (United Kingdom) G Stilwell	6	6
(Australia) M Rose (Australia) F Sedgman	3	2

Second round
4	(Netherlands) T Okker (United States) M Riessen	6	6
(Egypt) I El Shafei (New Zealand) B Fairlie	2	3
(Australia) S Ball (Australia) B Giltinan	3	6
6	(Australia) W Bowrey (Australia) O Davidson	6	7
(Australia) D Crealy (Australia) A Stone	6	3
(United States) R Lutz (United States) C Pasarell	7	6
(United Kingdom) M Cox (United Kingdom) G Stilwell	6	2
2	(Australia) R Emerson (Australia) R Laver	7	6

Quarterfinals
4	(Netherlands) T Okker (United States) M Riessen	6	6
6	(Australia) W Bowrey (Australia) O Davidson	2	3
(United States) R Lutz (United States) C Pasarell	6	6
2	(Australia) R Emerson (Australia) R Laver	4	3

Semifinals
4	(Netherlands) T Okker (United States) M Riessen	7	7
(United States) R Lutz (United States) C Pasarell	6	6
