= Jill Emmerson =

Australian tennis player

- Full name: Jill Alison Emmerson
- Country (sports): Australia
- Born: 24 July 1942 (age 82)
- Plays: Right-handed

Singles

Grand Slam singles results
- Australian Open: QF (1964)
- French Open: QF (1963)
- Wimbledon: 3R (1965)

Doubles

Grand Slam doubles results
- Australian Open: F (1971)
- French Open: F (1966)
- Wimbledon: QF (1965)

Jill Alison Emmerson (born 24 July 1942) is an Australian former tennis player from Sydney. She competed under her maiden name Jill Blackman until the late 1960s.

Emmerson was a singles quarterfinalist at the 1963 French Championships and 1964 Australian Championships. In 1966, she and Fay Toyne made the women's doubles final of the French Championships, which they lost in three sets to Margaret Smith and Judy Tegart. She made another grand slam doubles final in 1971 at the Australian Open, where she and partner Lesley Hunt were beaten by Margaret Court and Evonne Goolagong.

== Grand Slam finals ==
=== Doubles (2 runner-ups) ===
Result	Year	Championship	Surface	Partner	Opponents	Score
Loss	1966	French Championships	Clay	(Australia) Fay Toyne	(Australia) Margaret Smith (Australia) Judy Tegart	6–4, 1–6, 1–6
Loss	1971	Australian Open	Grass	(Australia) Lesley Hunt	(Australia) Margaret Court (Australia) Evonne Goolagong	0–6, 0–6

== See also ==
- List of Australian Open women's doubles finals
- List of French Open women's doubles finals
