= 1971 Australian Open – Men's singles =

Men's singles
- 1971 Australian Open

Final
- Champion: (Australia) Ken Rosewall
- Runner-up: (United States) Arthur Ashe
- Score: 6–1, 7–5, 6–3

Details
- Draw: 48
- Seeds: 16

Events
Singles	men	women		boys	girls
Doubles	men	women	mixed	boys	girls
- Australian Open

Ken Rosewall defeated defending champion Arthur Ashe in the final, 6–1, 7–5, 6–3 to win the men's singles tennis title at the 1971 Australian Open. It was his third Australian Open singles title and seventh Grand Slam tournament singles title overall. Rosewall did not lose a set during the tournament, the first man to do so at a Grand Slam tournament in the Open Era. He also remained the only man to do so at the Australian Open until Roger Federer joined him in 2007.

== Seeds ==
All seeds receive a bye into the second round.

1. (Australia) Rod Laver (third round)
2. (Australia) Ken Rosewall (champion)
3. (United States) Arthur Ashe (finals)
4. (Netherlands) Tom Okker (semifinals)
5. (Australia) Tony Roche (third round)
6. (Australia) Roy Emerson (quarterfinals)
7. (Australia) John Newcombe (third round)
8. (United Kingdom) Roger Taylor (third round)
9. (Spain) Andrés Gimeno (second round)
10. (United States) Marty Riessen (quarterfinals)
11. (United States) Dennis Ralston (third round)
12. (South Africa) Cliff Drysdale (quarterfinals)
13. (Socialist Federal Republic of Yugoslavia) Nikola Pilić (second round)
14. (Australia) Fred Stolle (third round)
15. (United Kingdom) Mark Cox (quarterfinals)
16. (United Arab Republic) Ismail El Shafei (third round)

== Draw ==
Key

- Q = Qualifier
- WC = Wild card
- LL = Lucky loser
- Alt = Alternate
- ITF = ITF entry
- PR = Protected ranking
- SR = Special ranking
- SE = Special exempt
- JE = Junior exempt
- JR = Junior Accelerator Programme entrant
- CO = College Accelerator Programme entrant
- NG = Next Gen Accelerator Program entrant
- w/o = Walkover
- r = Retired
- d = Defaulted

=== Final eight ===
Quarterfinals
15	(United Kingdom) Mark Cox	2	1	2
(United States) Robert Lutz	6	6	6
3	(United States) Arthur Ashe	7	7	2	6
12	(South Africa) Cliff Drysdale	6	6	6	2
10	(United States) Marty Riessen	3	3	3
4	(Netherlands) Tom Okker	6	6	6
6	(Australia) Roy Emerson	4	4	3
2	(Australia) Ken Rosewall	6	6	6

Semifinals
(United States) Robert Lutz	4	4	6
3	(United States) Arthur Ashe	6	6	7
4	(Netherlands) Tom Okker	2	6	4
2	(Australia) Ken Rosewall	6	7	6

Final
3	(United States) Arthur Ashe	1	5	3
2	(Australia) Ken Rosewall	6	7	6

=== Section 1 ===
First round
(Australia) A Gardiner	6	4	2
(Australia) C Dibley	7	6	6
(South Africa) R Maud	6	4	6	4	6
(Australia) J Cooper	3	6	2	6	7
(South Africa) G Forbes	2	4	4
(Australia) P Dent	6	6	6
(United States) R Lutz	6	6	7
(Australia) M Rose	3	4	5

Second round
1	(Australia) R Laver	7	6	6
(Australia) C Dibley	5	3	1
(Australia) J Cooper	3	6	4
15	(United Kingdom) M Cox	6	7	6
8	(United Kingdom) R Taylor	6	7	6
(Australia) P Dent	3	6	4
(United States) R Lutz	6	7	7
9	(Spain) A Gimeno	4	5	5

Third round
1	(Australia) R Laver	3	6	3	6
15	(United Kingdom) M Cox	6	4	6	7
8	(United Kingdom) R Taylor	7	1	6	3	2
(United States) R Lutz	6	6	3	6	6

Quarterfinals
15	(United Kingdom) M Cox	2	1	2
(United States) R Lutz	6	6	6

=== Section 2 ===
First round
(United Kingdom) J Feaver	6	2	4
(Australia) R Ruffels	7	6	6
(Australia) F Sedgman	6	6	6
(United States) R Barth	3	1	1
(Denmark) T Ulrich	6	1	1
(New Zealand) B Fairlie	7	6	6
(United Kingdom) R Wilson	4	4	6
(South Africa) R Moore	6	6	7

Second round
3	(United States) A Ashe	6	6	6	0	7
(Australia) R Ruffels	4	1	7	6	5
(Australia) F Sedgman	5	6	6
14	(Australia) F Stolle	7	7	7
12	(South Africa) C Drysdale	6	6	7	7
(New Zealand) B Fairlie	1	7	6	6
(South Africa) R Moore	3	6	1
5	(Australia) T Roche	6	7	6

Third round
3	(United States) A Ashe	5	6	6	6
14	(Australia) F Stolle	7	1	3	4
12	(South Africa) C Drysdale	4	6	6	7	6
5	(Australia) T Roche	6	4	7	6	1

Quarterfinals
3	(United States) A Ashe	7	7	2	6
12	(South Africa) C Drysdale	6	6	6	2

=== Section 3 ===
First round
(Australia) G Masters	7	3	4	1
(United States) C Pasarell	5	6	6	6
(Australia) M Anderson	7	6	6
(Australia) W Bowrey	6	2	4
(Australia) B Giltinan	6	6	6
(Japan) O Ishiguro	4	4	1
(Australia) B Phillips-Moore	6	3	1	6	6
(Australia) J Alexander	3	6	6	3	3

Second round
7	(Australia) J Newcombe	7	3	6	7
(United States) C Pasarell	6	6	4	5
(Australia) M Anderson	6	4	3	r.
10	(United States) M Riessen	7	6	2
13	(Socialist Federal Republic of Yugoslavia) N Pilić	w/o
(Australia) B Giltinan
(Australia) B Phillips-Moore	4	2	3
4	(Netherlands) T Okker	6	6	6

Third round
7	(Australia) J Newcombe	7	1	6	6
10	(United States) M Riessen	6	6	7	7
(Australia) B Giltinan	3	2	4
4	(Netherlands) T Okker	6	6	6

Quarterfinals
10	(United States) M Riessen	3	3	3
4	(Netherlands) T Okker	6	6	6

=== Section 4 ===
First round
(United Kingdom) G Stilwell	4	4	7	4
(Australia) O Davidson	6	6	6	6
(Australia) S Ball	4	7	6	7
(Australia) R Case	6	5	4	6
(South Africa) F McMillan	7	6	1	2
(Australia) D Crealy	5	7	6	6
(Australia) A Stone	6	4	2
(Australia) B Carmichael	7	6	6

Second round
6	(Australia) R Emerson	7	6	6
(Australia) O Davidson	5	3	2
(Australia) S Ball	4	4	3
11	(United States) D Ralston	6	6	6
16	(Egypt) I El Shafei	6	7	6
(Australia) D Crealy	4	5	1
(Australia) B Carmichael	5	5	5
2	(Australia) K Rosewall	7	7	7

Third round
6	(Australia) R Emerson	6	2	6	6
11	(United States) D Ralston	3	6	3	4
16	(Egypt) I El Shafei	0	2	6
2	(Australia) K Rosewall	6	6	7

Quarterfinals
6	(Australia) R Emerson	4	4	3
2	(Australia) K Rosewall	6	6	6

Preceded by 1970 U.S. Open	Grand Slam men's singles	Succeeded by 1971 French Open
