= Carol Sherriff =

Australian tennis player

- Full name: Carol Campling (née Sherriff)
- Country (sports): Australia
- Born: 20 October 1946 (age 78)
- Plays: Right-handed

Singles

Grand Slam singles results
- Australian Open: 2R (1966)
- French Open: 2R (1965, 1968)
- Wimbledon: 2R (1965, 1966, 1967, 1968)

Doubles

Grand Slam doubles results
- Australian Open: QF (1966, 1971, 1976)
- French Open: SF (1965)
- Wimbledon: QF (1969)

Carol Sherriff (born 20 October 1946) is an Australian former professional tennis player.

Sherriff, a right-handed player from Sydney, is a daughter of tennis coach Ross Sherriff and younger sister of Gail Sherriff, better known as Gail Chanfreau.

The sisters reached the doubles semi-finals of the 1965 French Championships together. They played against each other in the second round of the 1966 Wimbledon Championships, which was the only known occasion since 1884 that two sisters had faced off at Wimbledon. The match attracted attention from the local press and was won in three sets by her sister Gail.

From 1970 she competed as Carol Zeeman, after marrying South African tennis player Colin Zeeman. She has since remarried and is now Carol Campling.
