= Evonne Goolagong Cawley =

Australian tennis player

Evonne Goolagong Cawley AC MBE
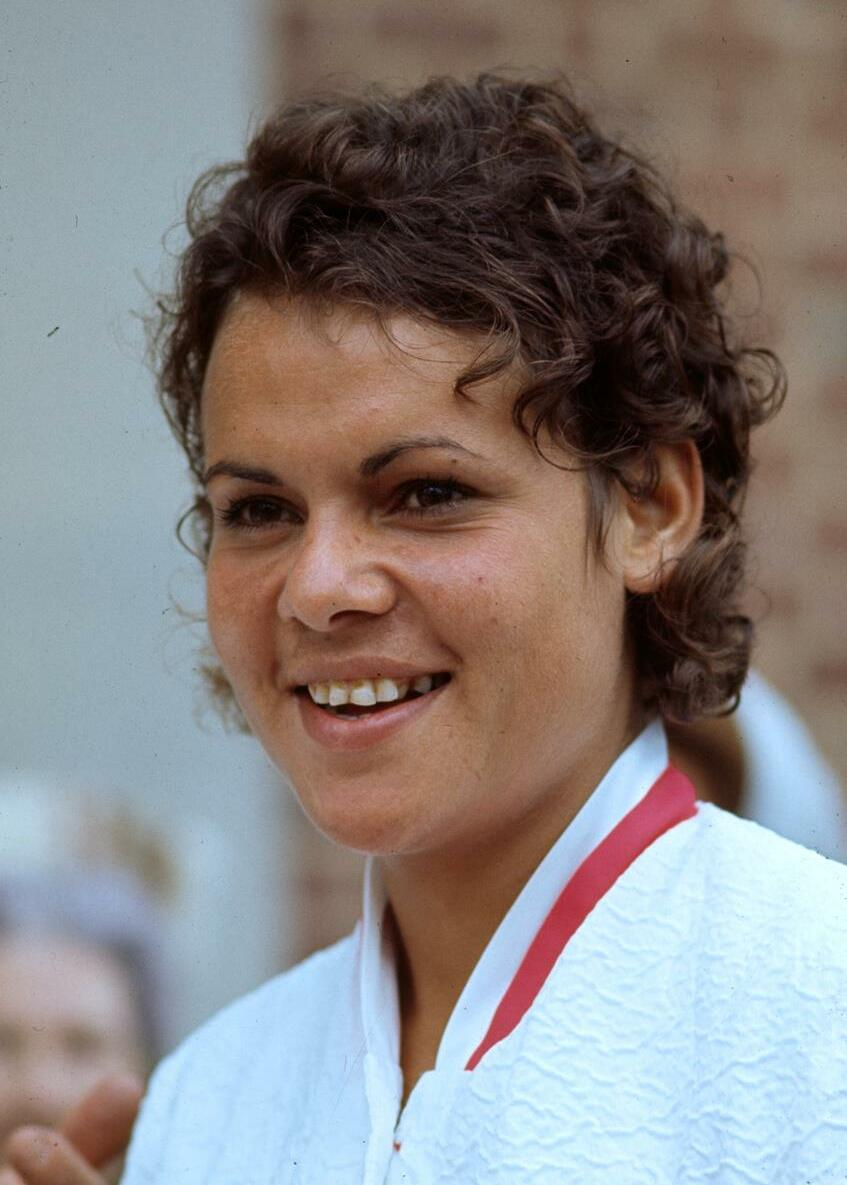
- Goolagong in 1973
- Full name: Evonne Fay Goolagong Cawley
- Country (sports): Australia
- Born: 31 July 1951 (age 75) Griffith, New South Wales, Australia
- Height: 1.68 m (5 ft 6 in)
- Retired: 1983
- Plays: Right-handed (one-handed backhand)
- Prize money: US$ 1,399,431
- Int. Tennis HoF: 1988 (member page)

Singles
- Career record: 704–165
- Career titles: 86
- Highest ranking: No. 1 (1971, Lance Tingay); No. 1 (26 April 1976, WTA)

Grand Slam singles results
- Australian Open: W (1974, 1975, 1976, 1977^{Dec})
- French Open: W (1971)
- Wimbledon: W (1971, 1980)
- US Open: F (1973, 1974, 1975, 1976)

Other tournaments
- Tour Finals: W (1974, 1976)

Doubles
- Career record: 18–16
- Career titles: 46

Grand Slam doubles results
- Australian Open: W (1971, 1974, 1975, 1976, 1977^{Dec})
- French Open: SF (1971)
- Wimbledon: W (1974)
- US Open: SF (1972, 1973, 1974)

Mixed doubles
- Career titles: 1

Grand Slam mixed doubles results
- French Open: W (1972)
- Wimbledon: F (1972)

Team competitions
- Fed Cup: W (1971, 1973, 1974)

Evonne Fay Goolagong Cawley (née Goolagong; born 31 July 1951) is an Australian former professional tennis player of Wiradjuri descent. She was ranked as the world No. 1 in women's singles by the Women's Tennis Association (WTA), and was one of the world's leading players in the 1970s and early 1980s. Goolagong won 86 WTA Tour-level singles titles, including seven singles majors, and 46 doubles titles, including seven doubles majors.

At the age of 19, Goolagong won the French Open singles and the Australian Open doubles championships (the latter with Margaret Court). She won the women's singles tournament at Wimbledon in 1971, becoming the second woman in the Open Era to complete the Channel Slam (winning the French Open and Wimbledon in the same year). Goolagong is the only woman to beat Court, Martina Navratilova, and Chris Evert in a major final. In 1980 she won Wimbledon again, this time as a mother and becoming the first mother to win the title in 66 years. She represented Australia in three Fed Cup competitions, winning the title in 1971, 1973 and 1974, and was Fed Cup captain for three consecutive years. After retiring from professional tennis in 1983, Goolagong played in senior invitational competitions, endorsed a variety of products, worked as a touring professional, and held sports-related leadership roles.

Goolagong was named Australian of the Year in 1971. She was appointed as a Member of the Order of the British Empire in 1972 and as an Officer of the Order of Australia in 1982. Goolagong was inducted into the Sport Australia Hall of Fame in 1985, the International Tennis Hall of Fame in 1988, and the Aboriginal Sporting Hall of Fame in 1989. She leads the Goolagong National Development Camp for Indigenous boys and girls, which encourages Indigenous youth to stay in school.

== Early life ==
Evonne Fay Goolagong was born in Griffith, New South Wales and shortly afterwards moved to Barellan. She was the third of eight children in an Australian Aboriginal (Wiradjuri) family. Her father, Ken Goolagong, was a sheep shearer, and her mother, Melinda, was a homemaker. Evonne Goolagong grew up during the time of the stolen generations in Australia, and was directly impacted by it:

Lucky not to be taken away by the stolen generation because I've had to hide a few times under the bed. We visited my cousin in Griffith, which is where I was born, in the mission there. Every time a shiny car would come down the road, my mum used to say "you better run and hide, the welfare man's going to take you away." So I remember hiding very nervously under the bed, 'cause I didn't want to get taken away.

Despite the widespread disadvantage and prejudice Aboriginal people experienced in Australia, Goolagong was able to play tennis in Barellan from childhood, thanks to an area resident, Bill Kurtzman, who saw her peering through the fence at the local courts and encouraged her to come in and play.

In 1965, Vic Edwards, the proprietor of a tennis school in Sydney, was tipped off by two of his assistants, travelled to Barellan to take a look at the young Goolagong, and immediately saw her potential. He persuaded her parents to allow her to move to Sydney, where she attended Willoughby Girls High School. There, she completed her School Certificate in 1968 and, at the same time, lived with the family of Edwards, who had become her legal guardian, coach, and manager.

== Playing career ==
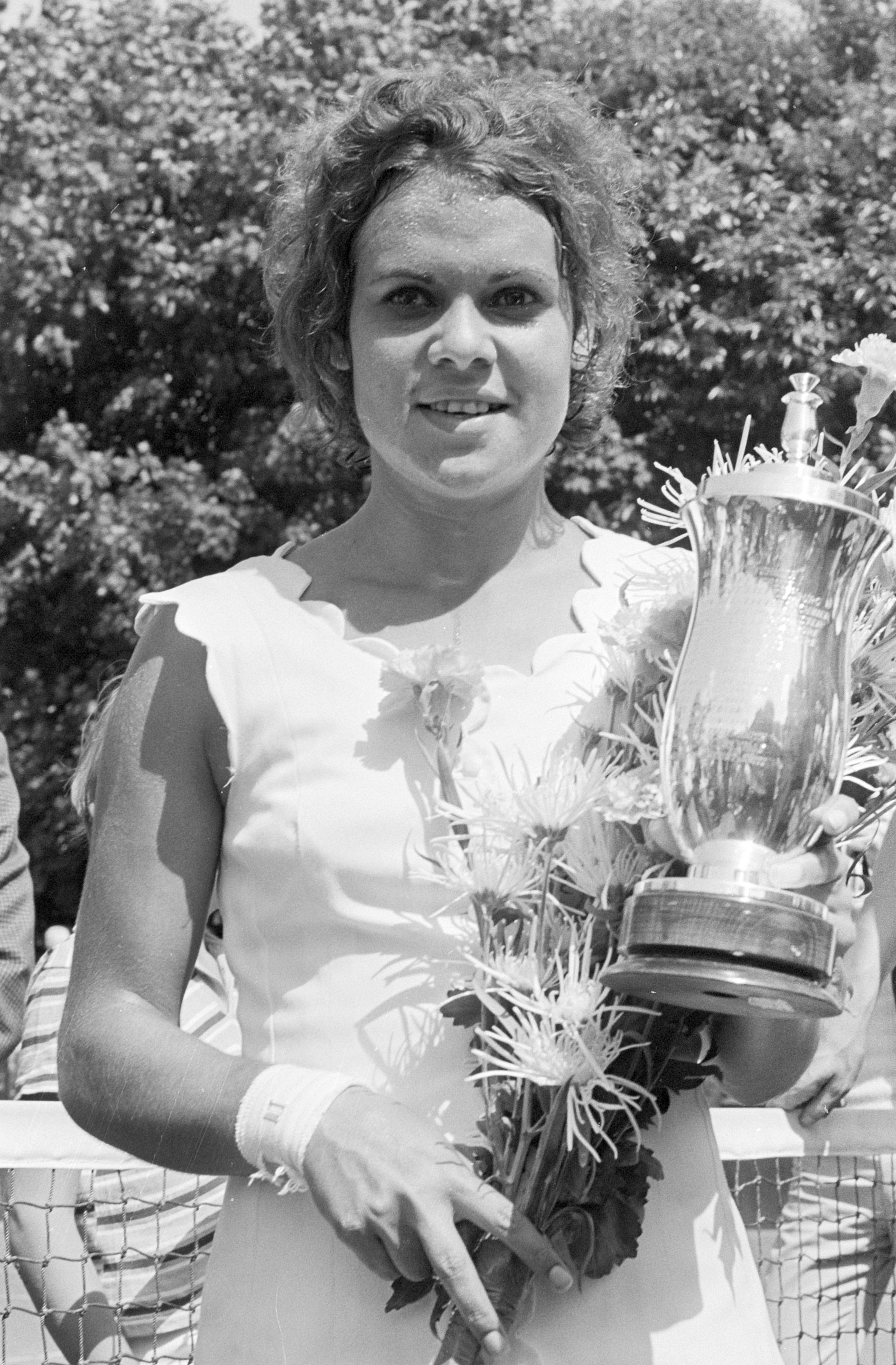
Goolagong at the 1971 Dutch Open

=== Overall record ===
With seven championships, Goolagong is 12th on the women's list of all-time singles Grand Slam winners, and ended her career with 86 singles titles. She took singles and doubles titles at the Australian Open and Wimbledon and singles and mixed doubles titles at the French Open. She never won the US Open. She won seven Grand Slam singles titles in her career, reaching a total of 18 Grand Slam singles finals.

Goolagong reached four consecutive US Open singles finals, from 1973 to 1976, but lost them all. She is the only player in U.S. Championships history to have lost four consecutive finals. Goolagong made seven consecutive finals at the Australian Open, winning three titles in a row. Despite reaching the final at her first two appearances in 1971 and 1972, after 1973 Goolagong did not compete at the Roland-Garros for a decade. The French Tennis Federation banned all World Team Tennis contracted players from the 1974 event, with the player's unions instigating legal action against the French authorities. As Jimmy Connors and Goolagong were the reigning Australian Open champions, they spearheaded the legal action as they were being deprived of the opportunity to attain the tennis calendar Grand Slam as a result of the decision. Connors admitted this was a huge distraction and later wrote both he and Goolagong were "hung out to dry". Goolagong boycotted the event even after the ban was lifted, but returned in 1983 for her final Grand Slam singles appearance. She lost in the last thirty-two to Chris Evert and did not compete in any further Grand Slam singles events. Her last appearance at Grand Slam level came at the following 1983 Wimbledon Championships when she partnered with Sue Barker to a first-round defeat in the doubles, having withdrawn from the singles event earlier.

Her career win/loss percentage was 81.0% (704–165). Her win/loss performance in all Grand Slam singles tournaments was 82.1% (133–29), at the French Open 84.2% (16–3), at Wimbledon 83.3% (50–10), at the US Open 81.3% (26–6), and at the Australian Open 80.4% (41–10).

Goolagong was ranked No. 1 in the world in women's tennis for two weeks in 1976, but it was not reported at the time because incomplete data was used to calculate the rankings. This was discovered in December 2007, 31 years later. She was the second woman to hold the top spot, but the 16th at the time she was finally recognised.

=== 1970s ===
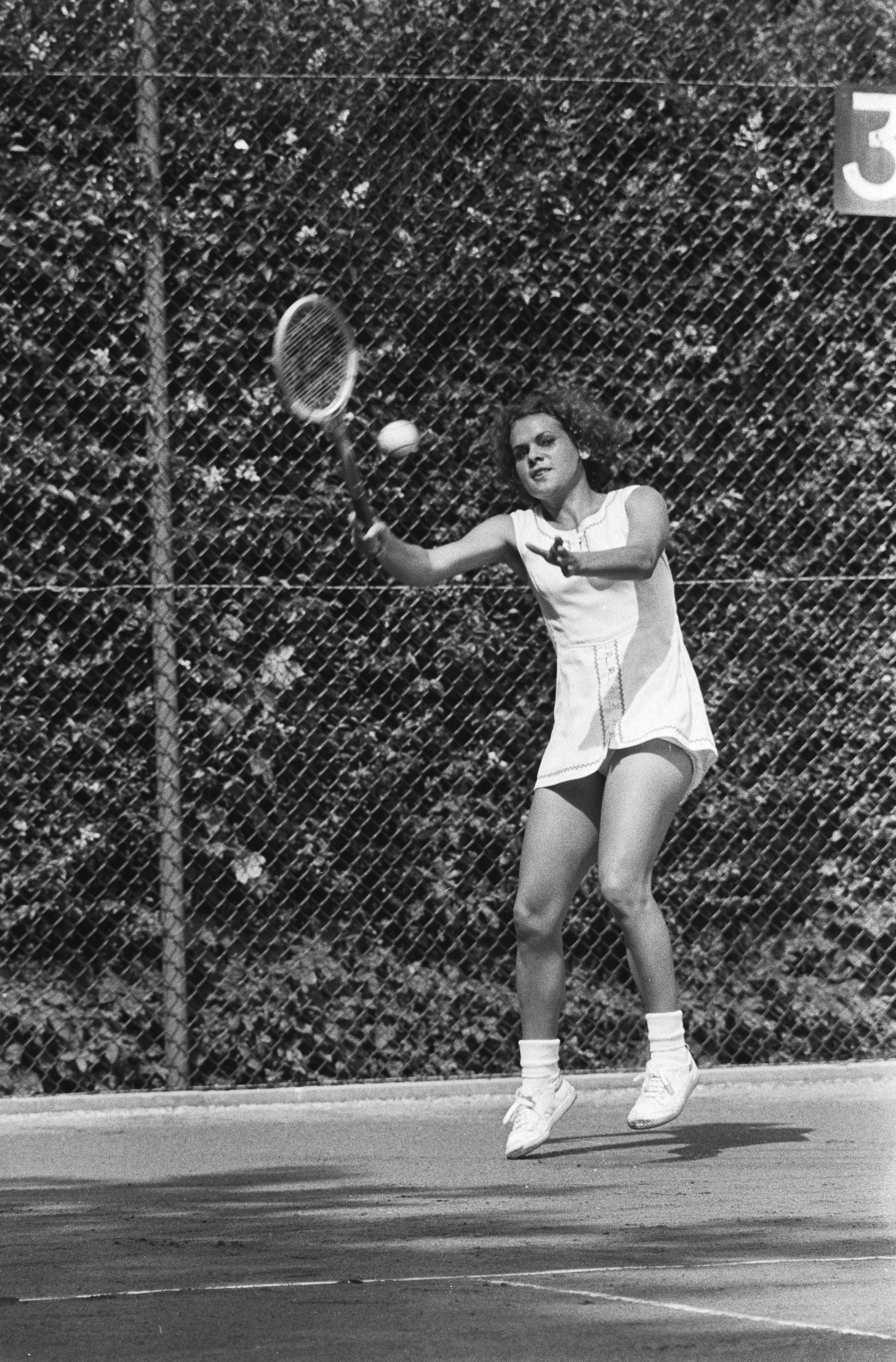
Goolagong in 1971

During the 1970s, Goolagong Cawley played in 17 Grand Slam singles finals, a period record for any player, man or woman. From her first Grand Slam singles final appearance in January 1971, to December 1977 when she won her last Grand Slam title of the 1970s, she played in 21 Grand Slam events. Her only four defeats prior to the finals came at the 1972 US Open in the third round; 1974 Wimbledon, where she was defeated in the quarterfinals; and at the semifinal stages of the French Open and Wimbledon in 1973. To start the decade, she was defeated at the 1970 Australian Open in the quarterfinals and in the second round of the 1970 Wimbledon. In 1971, 1975, 1976 and 1977, Goolagong reached the final of every Grand Slam championship in which she competed.

Between 1973 and 1977, she reached the final of almost every Grand Slam singles event she entered. The exceptions were: Roland-Garros, where she lost to Margaret Court in the semifinals in 1973; and Wimbledon, where she played in only two finals in that period, 1975 and 1976, losing both; she lost in 1973 to eventual champion Billie Jean King in the semifinals; and in 1974 to Australian Kerry Melville at the quarterfinal stage; she did not enter in 1977, the year her daughter was born. Also in 1974, she teamed with Peggy Michel, her teammate on the Pittsburgh Triangles of the World Team Tennis league, to win the ladies' doubles title. She won the women's doubles title at the Australian Open five times and in Roland Garros once, as well as mixed doubles at Roland Garros once.

Following her victory at the season-ending WTA Championships in 1976—known at the time as the Virginia Slims Championships—her seventh tournament victory of the year, Goolagong continued to play on the WTA Tour until 1983, but never again played a full season. After her victory over Chris Evert in the WTA Championships, she only played in three competitive tournaments for the remainder of 1976, losing in both finals to Evert (Wimbledon and US Open) and the Sydney quarterfinals in November, which she played while four months pregnant. She focused instead on WTT Team Tennis, winning the WTT Championship as a member of the Pittsburgh Triangles in 1975 and playing exhibition events.

Goolagong realised during the 1976 US Open final that she was pregnant and after one more tournament for the year, she did not play again on the regular tour until the summer of 1977, continuing through to Wimbledon 1978. The year 1976 had been her best season to date, winning seven titles, rising to number one in the world and losing only to Chris Evert, which she did five times and once to Dianne Fromholtz in Sydney, which she played in the second trimester of her pregnancy. No other players were able to score a victory over her in the year.

After attempting a comeback in the summer of 1977, Goolagong decided to wait for the Australian season beginning later in the year for a full return. Her return to the tour proper kick-started a highly successful run of play, during which she won ten tournaments including the Australian Open in a run of five consecutive tournament wins and reached the final in two others, including the season-ending WTA Championships, where she lost to Martina Navratilova.

At the Virginia Slims of Boston in March 1978, Goolagong beat both Navratilova and Evert back-to-back to win the title. It was her only post pregnancy victory over Navratilova and one of only two she scored over Evert. Prior to her first pregnancy, Goolagong led Navratilova 11–4 in their rivalry, but she lost 11 of their 12 matches after her daughter was born to trail 12–15 at the end of her career. From being un-ranked at the beginning of her return, Goolagong's ranking rose to No. 3 in the world, but during Wimbledon 1978, a career-threatening ankle injury forced her to miss the remainder of 1978, other than the exhibition Emeron Cup event played in December, where she played with her ankle heavily strapped and lost to both Navratilova and Virginia Wade in straight sets. She did not return to competitive play until March 1979, when she won four tournaments and ended the year ranked No. 4 in the world.

=== 1980s ===
Injuries and illness at the beginning of 1980 kept her away from the tour for many weeks in the first six months of the year and only reached four finals, but she returned in triumph at Wimbledon, yet only played three further tournaments and the exhibition Lion's Cup for the remainder of the year after her final Grand Slam victory. For her Wimbledon triumph, Goolagong beat four top 10 players (Hana Mandlíková #9, Wendy Turnbull #6, Tracy Austin #2 and Chris Evert #3), the only champion in Wimbledon history to do so. She also beat two former Grand Slam finalists in earlier rounds, Sharon Walsh and Betty Stöve. She withdrew from the US Open, where she had been seeded fourth, due to a recurring back injury and the early stages of her second pregnancy, but she did play the Lion's Cup (losing to Evert) and the Australian Open championships at the end of the year despite being four and five months pregnant respectively. Other players, including Wendy Turnbull, publicly decried the decision by Tennis Australia to pay Goolagong appearance fees to compete at the Australian Open from 1980 onwards. Goolagong defended the decision to accept the fees to compete in her later autobiography.

Goolagong was then absent for almost all of 1981, returning to tournament play in Australia towards the end of the year and after losing in the first round in Perth, she reached the quarterfinals of the only other two tournaments she played for the year, losing to Evert in Sydney, and at the Australian Open to Navratilova. Her comeback was inconsistent and she did not play again until March 1982 when she pushed Evert to three sets and defeated reigning French Open champion Hana Mandlikova in the Citizen Cup played on clay in March 1982.

Goolagong then lost her first matches of all her next three tournaments; pulling out in the final set of the Family Circle Cup to Joanne Russell; losing to Pam Teeguarden at the Dow Classic and at Wimbledon 1982, where she was given a protected seeding of 16th by the All England Club, losing her only match to Zina Garrison. For the remainder of the year, Cawley played little, but did win two of her three matches in the Federation Cup. Cawley did not play competitively again until November when she lost in the first round to Sue Barker in Brisbane, but reached her only singles final at Sydney, where after defeating world no.3 Andrea Jaeger, she lost in three sets to Navratilova. She followed this with a three-set loss to Candy Reynolds in the last 32 of the Australian Open. Despite the lack of play, Cawley ended the year ranked 17th and was given a spot in the WTA season ending championship, where she lost to Pam Shriver.

In 1983, she failed to reach the quarterfinal of any event and played her last Grand Slam singles match at the French Open, where she lost to Evert in the third round. At the Dow Classic in Edgbaston, she lost in the last 16 to Anne White, before withdrawing from Wimbledon. Despite not playing the singles, she partnered Sue Barker in the Wimbledon doubles event, losing in the first round, her last Grand Slam appearance.

A brief return to competitive play came in 1985, when in May 1985, Goolagong accepted an invitation to compete at the Australian Indoor Championship, played on carpet. She lost her only match to another Australian veteran, Amanda Tobin Evans.

Goolagong considered retiring when she gave birth to Kelly, her first child. However she was able to balance family life with tennis and continued playing professionally.

She is the only mother to have won the Wimbledon title since Dorothea Lambert Chambers in 1914.

== Life after touring ==
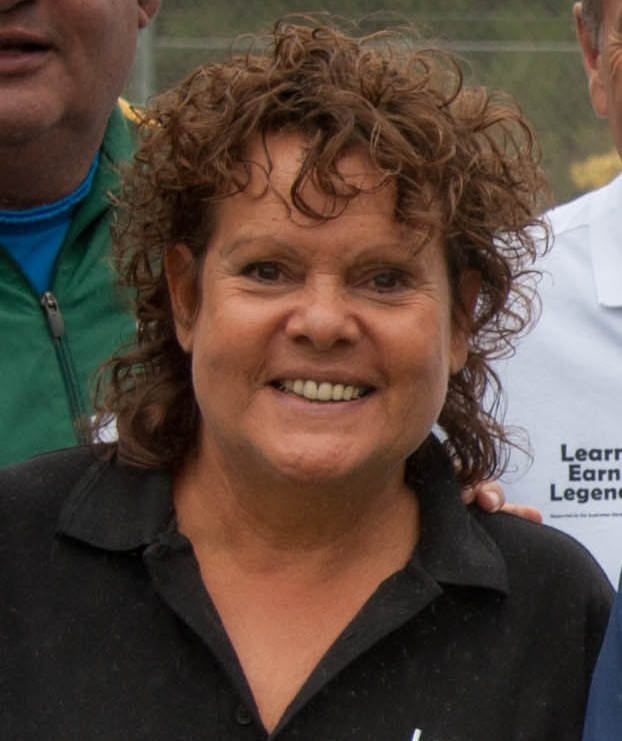
Goolagong in 2012

Beginning during her playing days, Goolagong endorsed many products and appeared in numerous television and print commercials, extending these further once she retired from competitive play. Her various commercials included KFC (in which she appeared with her husband Roger), Geritol and Sears, where she also promoted her own sports clothing brand 'Go Goolagong'.

A one-off return to competitive action came at the 1985 Australian Indoor Championship organised by the ITF, but Goolagong lost her only match.

In 1988, she was inducted into the International Tennis Hall of Fame.

In 1990, Goolagong began to play in senior invitational competitions, returning to Wimbledon to compete in the inaugural ladies senior invitational doubles, alongside compatriot Kerry Melville Reid.

Goolagong spent some time as a touring professional at the Hilton Head Racquet Club in South Carolina before returning to Australia.

Goolagong was a member of the Board of the Australian Sports Commission from 1995 to 1997 and since 1997 has held the position of Sports Ambassador to Aboriginal and Torres Strait Islander Communities. She was appointed captain of the Australian Fed Cup team in 2002. In 2003, she was the winner for the Oceania region of the International Olympic Committee's 2003 "Women and Sports Trophy". She also runs an annual "Goolagong National Development Camp", with the aim of encouraging Aboriginal children to stay in school through playing competitive tennis.

On 10 October 2023, Goolagong was one of 25 Australians of the Year who signed an open letter supporting the Yes vote in the Indigenous Voice referendum, initiated by psychiatrist Patrick McGorry.

== Awards and recognition ==
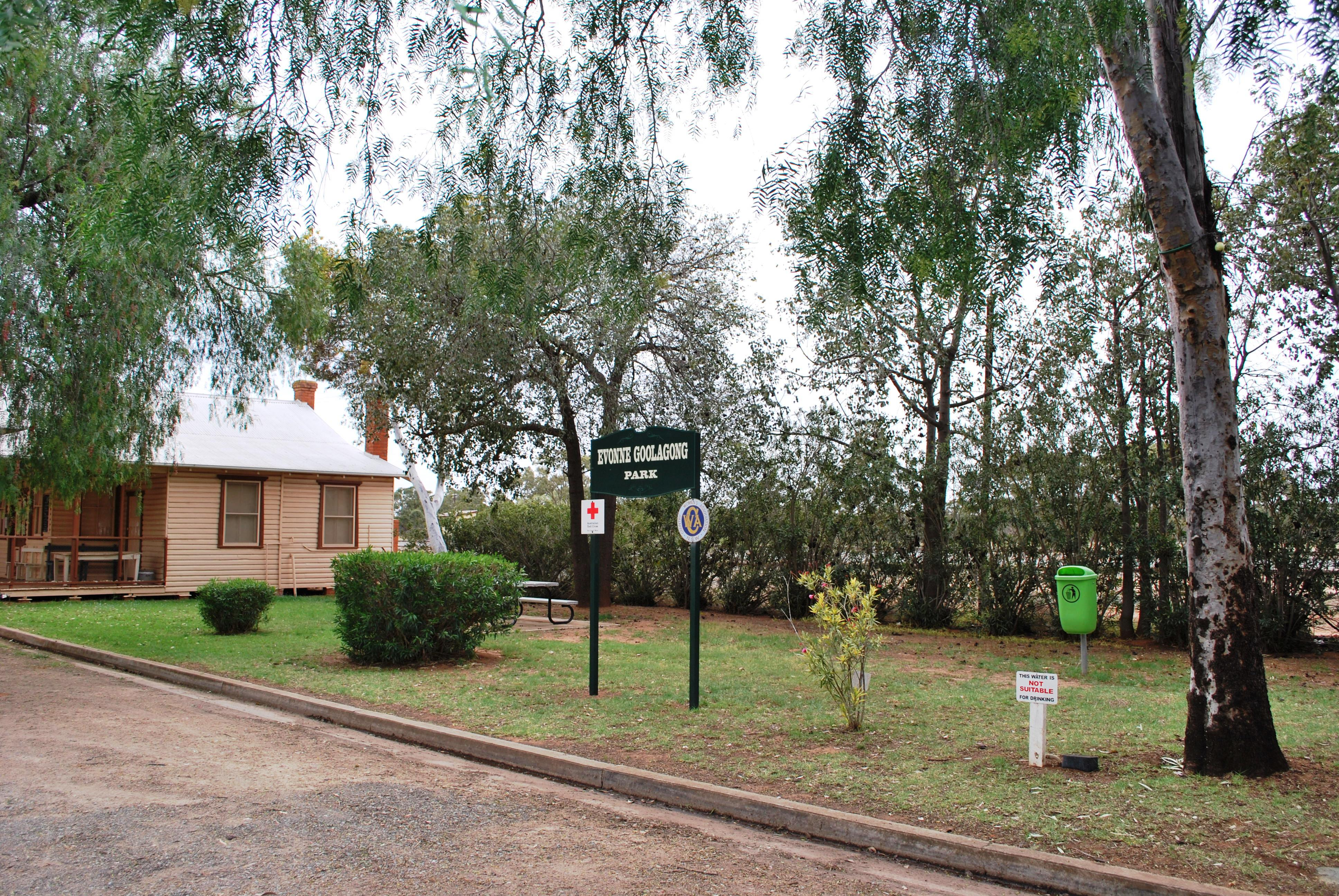
Evonne Goolagong Park, Barellan

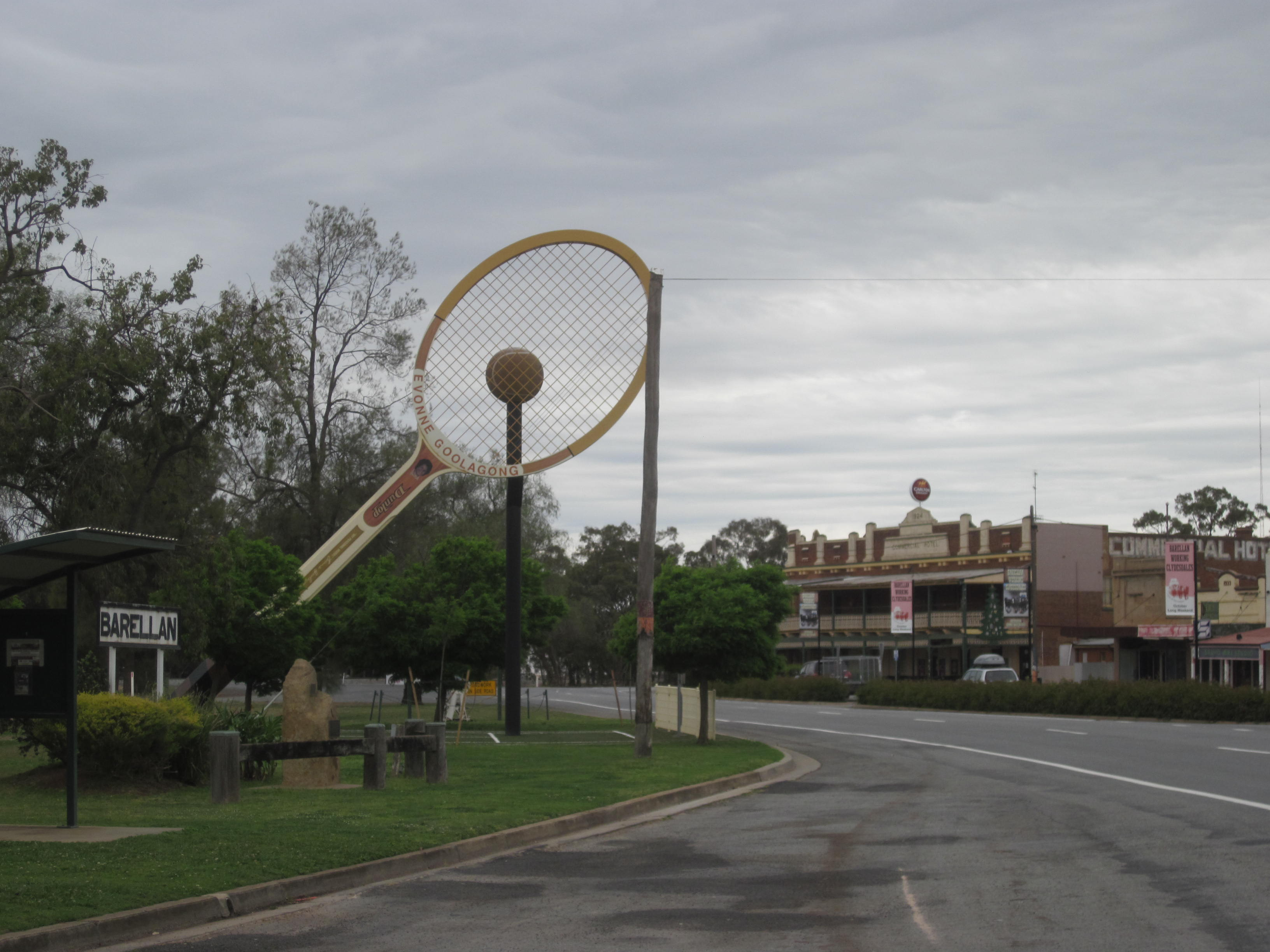
The "big" tennis racquet at Barellan, New South Wales, commemorates the achievements of Evonne Goolagong.

Goolagong was awarded Australian of the Year in 1971. She was appointed a Member of the Order of the British Empire in 1972 and made an Officer of the Order of Australia in 1982. In 1985 she was inducted into the Sport Australia Hall of Fame. In 1988, Goolagong was inducted into the International Tennis Hall of Fame. In 2018, she was advanced to a Companion of the Order of Australia "for eminent service to tennis as a player at the national and international level, as an ambassador, supporter and advocate for the health, education and wellbeing of young Indigenous people through participation in sport, and as a role model".

In 1972, she played in a segregated South African tournament. To spare her the discrimination experienced by non-whites, the South African authorities classified her as an honorary white.

In 1978 and 1980, she was awarded the WTA Sportsmanship Award.

The Evonne Goolagong Cawley Trophy, awarded to the female champion at the Brisbane International, is named in her honour.

In 1993, the State Transit Authority named a RiverCat ferry in Sydney after her. This rivercat travels daily from Parramatta to Circular Quay.

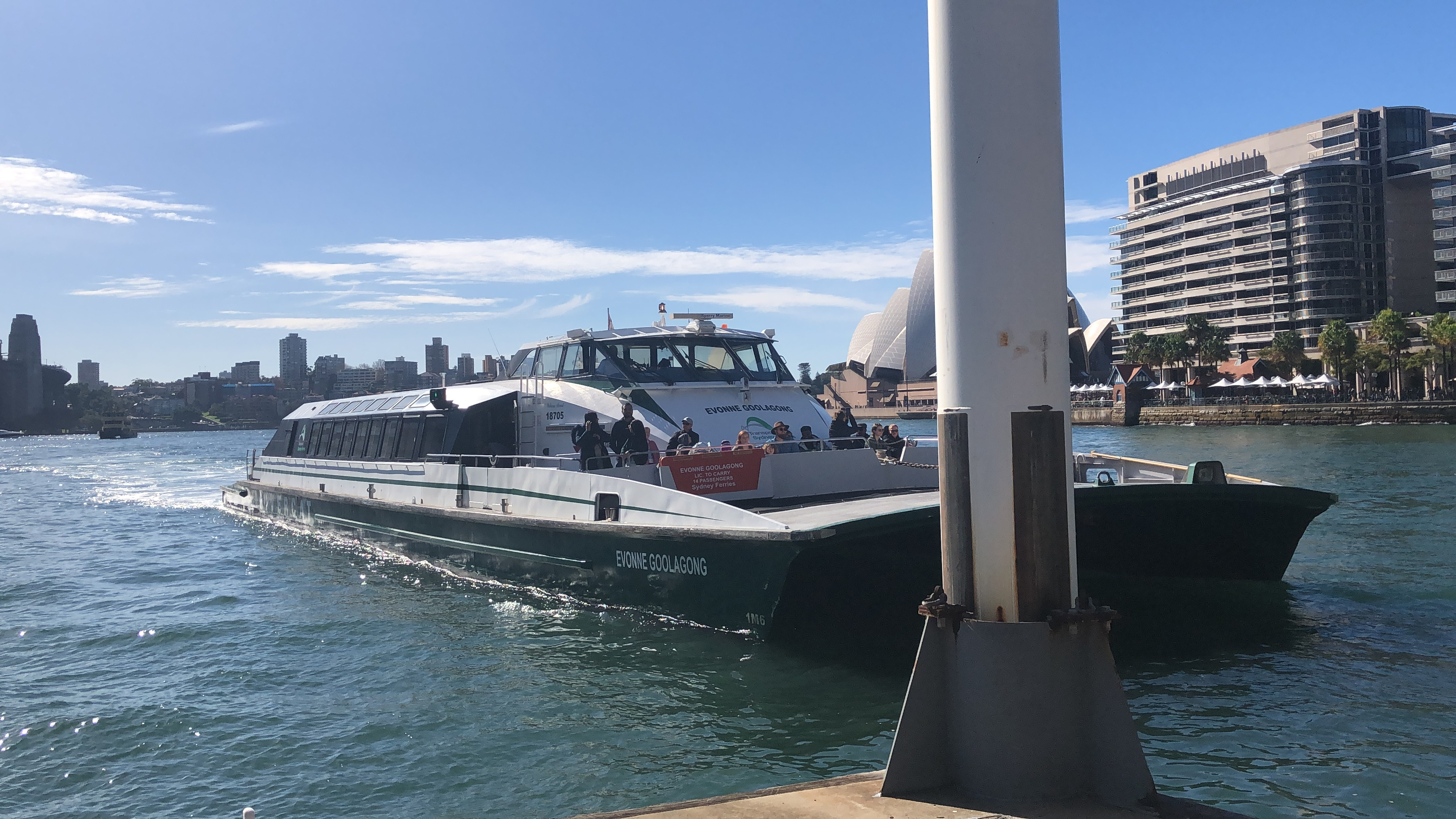
(Now Withdrawn and Scrapped) Rivercat MV Evonne Goolagong at Circular Quay as it came from the Parramatta River

The National Museum of Australia holds the Evonne Goolagong Cawley collection of memorabilia. This includes her 1971 and 1980 Wimbledon singles trophies, the trophy from her 1974 doubles win and two racquets used in these tournaments. The museum's collection also includes a signed warm-up jacket and a dress with a bolero style top designed by Ted Tinling in the early 1970s.

In 2001, Goolagong was inducted into the Victorian Honour Roll of Women for her achievements as a tennis player.

A 13.8-metre (45 ft) long replica of a tennis racquet used by Goolagong has been built in Evonne Goolagong Park in Goolagong's hometown of Barellan. Goolagong unveiled the exact scale model of the wooden Dunlop racquet during Barellan's centenary celebrations on 3 October 2009.

In February 2016, Goolagong and ten other Australian tennis players were honoured by Australia Post as the recipients of the 2016 Australia Post Legends Award and appeared on a postage stamp set named Australian Legends of Singles Tennis.

In April 2016, Goolagong was awarded an honorary doctorate from the University of South Australia in recognition of her distinguished service to the community.

In June 2018, the International Tennis Federation (ITF) presented her with its highest accolade, the Philippe Chatrier Award for her contributions to tennis.

In 2025, she was awarded the National Sportsperson Lifetime Achievement Award at the National Aboriginal and Torres Strait Islander Sports Awards.

Goolagong is generally regarded as one of the all-time greats of women's tennis.

== Personal life ==
When Victor Edwards became her coach, Goolagong went to live with him and his family. He became her legal guardian as well as her coach and manager. Goolagong later said that Edwards made sexual advances to her. When she met former junior British tennis player Roger Cawley in 1971, her relationship with Edwards became strained, but she was legally tied to him as he controlled every aspect of her career and finances until her marriage to Cawley on 19 June 1975 in Canterbury, England. Goolagong severed all contact with Edwards at that point, although he remained her official coach for Wimbledon 1975. During the tournament, Edwards sat on the opposite side of the players' box from Roger Cawley at her matches, and Edwards and his protégée were no longer on speaking terms. Cawley became her coach, hitting partner, and manager from the time they married. Following her wedding, she settled in Naples, Florida.

Goolagong's father, Ken, was killed after being hit by a car in 1974, shortly after Edwards had refused to release any of her money to purchase a new family vehicle when requested. Her mother, Melinda, died in 1991. Her first child, a daughter, was born in the US. Her son, Morgan Kiema Cawley, played in the National Soccer League. Goolagong is the maternal great aunt of National Rugby League player Latrell Mitchell, born Latrell Goolagong.

Goolagong's brother Ian was an amateur tennis player who never pursued the sport professionally, but he partnered with Evonne in the mixed doubles tournament at Wimbledon in 1982 (the pair lost their only match). As of 2015, Ian Goolagong was the president and coach at the Lalor Tennis Club in Victoria.

In the 2020s, Goolagong Cawley battled a number of health issues. Her husband suffered multiple heart attacks, while Cawley herself underwent hip surgery, after being diagnosed with Giant Cell Arteritis, an inflammatory condition which causes stiffness, soreness, and throbbing headaches, which led to her experiencing bad side effects (such as a bloated face and raised cholesterol) from prescribed treatments like prednisolone and tocilizumab. As well as battling RSV, Cawley suffered a hard fall causing concussion, followed by ongoing vertigo, trouble focusing, memory issues, fatigue, and sensitivity to light and noise.

In 2026, she published a second autobiographical memoir ''Only Ever Evonne'', which chronicled her recent health issues, while retelling her life story in more detail; including incidents of racism in her youth and her relationship with Vic Edwards, including his unwanted and unrequited sexual advances.

== In the arts and popular culture ==
A play based on the life of Goolagong Cawley called Sunshine Super Girl, written and directed by Andrea James, was to have premièred with the Melbourne Theatre Company in 2020, but the event was cancelled owing to the COVID-19 pandemic in Australia. Instead, it premiered in Griffith, New South Wales, in October 2020 before a run at the Sydney Festival in January 2021, produced by Performing Lines.

A three-part drama miniseries entitled Goolagong, directed by Wayne Blair, with Lila McGuire in the title role, aired on ABC TV in January 2026. On 15 May 2026, the BBC announced that it had acquired the drama for BBC Four and BBC iPlayer, to be shown in June.

== Career statistics ==
=== Grand Slam tournament performance timeline ===
Key
**W**	F	SF	QF	#R	RR	Q#	DNQ	A	NH

(W) winner; (F) finalist; (SF) semifinalist; (QF) quarterfinalist; (#R) rounds 4, 3, 2, 1; (RR) round-robin stage; (Q#) qualification round; (DNQ) did not qualify; (A) absent; (NH) not held; (SR) strike rate (events won / competed); (W–L) win–loss record.

Tournament	1967	1968	1969	1970	1971	1972	1973	1974	1975	1976	1977		1978	1979	1980	1981	1982	1983	SR	W–L	Win %
Australian Open	3R	3R	2R	QF	F	F	F	**W**	**W**	**W**	A	**W**	A	A	2R	QF	2R	A	4 / 14	41–10	80.4
French Open	A	A	A	A	**W**	F	SF	A	A	A	A		A	A	A	A	A	3R	1 / 4	16–3	84.2
Wimbledon	A	A	A	2R	**W**	F	SF	QF	F	F	A		SF	SF	**W**	A	2R	A	2 / 11	49–9	84.5
US Open	A	A	A	A	A	3R	F	F	F	F	A		A	QF	A	A	A	A	0 / 6	26–6	81.3
Win–loss	2–1	2–1	1–1	3–2	16–1	15–4	18–4	14–2	15–2	16–2	5–0		4–1	9–2	7–1	2–1	1–2	2–1	7 / 35	132–28	82.5
Year-end ranking	–	–	–	–	–	–	–	–	5	2	–		3	4	5	–	17	37			

Note: The Australian Open was held twice in 1977, in January and December. Goolagong won the December edition. She was seeded fourth for the 1980 US Open Championships, but withdrew from the tournament before play began.

=== Grand Slam tournament finals ===
==== Singles: 18 (7–11) ====
Result	Year	Championship	Surface	Opponent	Score
Loss	1971	Australian Open	Grass	(Australia) Margaret Court	6–2, 6–7^{(0–7)}, 5–7
Win	1971	French Open	Clay	(Australia) Helen Gourlay	6–3, 7–5
Win	1971	Wimbledon	Grass	(Australia) Margaret Court	6–4, 6–1
Loss	1972	Australian Open	Grass	(United Kingdom) Virginia Wade	4–6, 4–6
Loss	1972	French Open	Clay	(United States) Billie Jean King	3–6, 3–6
Loss	1972	Wimbledon	Grass	(United States) Billie Jean King	3–6, 3–6
Loss	1973	Australian Open	Grass	(Australia) Margaret Court	4–6, 5–7
Loss	1973	US Open	Grass	(Australia) Margaret Court	6–7^{(2–7)}, 7–5, 2–6
Win	1974	Australian Open	Grass	(United States) Chris Evert	7–6^{(7–5)}, 4–6, 6–0
Loss	1974	US Open	Grass	(United States) Billie Jean King	6–3, 3–6, 5–7
Win	1975	Australian Open (2)	Grass	(Czechoslovakia) Martina Navratilova	6–3, 6–2
Loss	1975	Wimbledon	Grass	(United States) Billie Jean King	0–6, 1–6
Loss	1975	US Open	Clay	(United States) Chris Evert	7–5, 4–6, 2–6
Win	1976	Australian Open (3)	Grass	(Czechoslovakia) Renáta Tomanová	6–2, 6–2
Loss	1976	Wimbledon	Grass	(United States) Chris Evert	3–6, 6–4, 6–8
Loss	1976	US Open	Clay	(United States) Chris Evert	3–6, 0–6
Win	1977	Australian Open^{(Dec)} (4)	Grass	(Australia) Helen Gourlay	6–3, 6–0
Win	1980	Wimbledon (2)	Grass	(United States) Chris Evert	6–1, 7–6^{(7–4)}

==== Doubles: 7 (6–1) ====
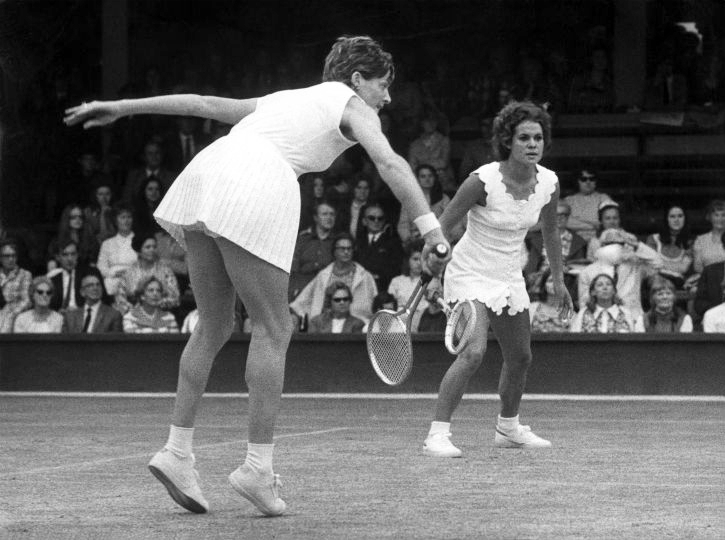
Evonne Goolagong (right) partnering Margaret Court in a doubles semifinal at the 1971 Wimbledon Championships

Result	Year	Championship	Surface	Partner	Opponents	Score
Win	1971	Australian Open	Grass	(Australia) Margaret Court	(Australia) Jill Emmerson (Australia) Lesley Hunt	6–0, 6–0
Loss	1971	Wimbledon	Grass	(Australia) Margaret Court	(United States) Rosemary Casals (United States) Billie Jean King	3–6, 2–6
Win	1974	Australian Open (2)	Grass	(United States) Peggy Michel	(Australia) Kerry Harris (Australia) Kerry Melville	7–5 6–3
Win	1974	Wimbledon	Grass	(United States) Peggy Michel	(Australia) Helen Gourlay (Australia) Karen Krantzcke	2–6, 6–4, 6–3
Win	1975	Australian Open (3)	Grass	(United States) Peggy Michel	(Australia) Margaret Court (Soviet Union) Olga Morozova	7–6, 7–6
Win	1976	Australian Open (4)	Grass	(Australia) Helen Gourlay	(Czechoslovakia) Renáta Tomanová (Australia) Lesley Turner Bowrey	8–1
Win	1977	Australian Open [Dec.] (5)	Grass	(Australia) Helen Gourlay	(United States) Mona Guerrant (Australia) Kerry Melville Reid	Shared - rained out

Note: The shared women's doubles title at the Australian Open in 1977 (December) is not traditionally counted in Goolagong's win total because the finals were never played. Evonne Cawley is occasionally credited incorrectly with winning the 1977 Ladies Doubles event at Wimbledon, due to the confusion regarding the married name of her compatriot Helen Gourlay who in fact took the trophy. Both women were listed in tournaments as Mrs. R. Cawley (Goolagong was Mrs. R. A. Cawley and Gourlay Mrs. R. L. Cawley). Goolagong Cawley did not participate at Wimbledon 1977.

==== Mixed doubles: 2 (1–1) ====
Result	Year	Championship	Surface	Partner	Opponents	Score
Win	1972	French Open	Clay	(Australia) Kim Warwick	(France) Françoise Dürr (France) Jean-Claude Barclay	6–2, 6–4
Loss	1972	Wimbledon	Grass	(Australia) Kim Warwick	(United States) Rosemary Casals (Romania) Ilie Năstase	4–6, 4–6

=== Records ===
- These records were attained in the Open Era of tennis.
- Records in **bold** indicate peer-less achievements.

Championship	Years	Record accomplished	Player tied
Australian Open	1971–1976	6 consecutive finals	Martina Hingis
Australian Open	1975–1977^{[b]}	3 wins without losing a set	Steffi Graf
Australian Open	1974–1976	3 consecutive titles	Margaret Court; Steffi Graf; Monica Seles; Martina Hingis
**French Open**	**1971**	**Won title on the first attempt**	**Stands alone**
Wimbledon	1980	Won Wimbledon as a mother	Dorothea Lambert Chambers
**Wimbledon**	**1980**	**Only singles champion to defeat four top ten seeds (Mandlikova #9, Turnbull #6, Austin #2, Evert-Lloyd #3)**	**Stands alone**
**US Open**	**1973–1976**	**4 consecutive runner-ups**	**Stands alone**

== Footnotes ==
- ^{a} Margaret Osborne duPont and Althea Gibson also hold these records; however, they attained those in the pre-Open Era.
- ^{b} The Australian Open was held twice in 1977, in January and December. Goolagong Cawley did not play in the January edition but made the final in the December tournament.

== See also ==
- List of female tennis players
- Tennis performance timeline comparison (women) (1884–1977)
- Tennis performance timeline comparisons

== Bibliography ==
- 1st Autobiography: Evonne Goolagong Cawley; Phil Jarrett (1993). Home! The Evonne Goolagong Story. Simon & Schuster. ISBN 0731803817.
- Biography: Andrea James (2024). Sunshine Super Girl: The Evonne Goolagong Story. Currency plays. ISBN 9781760626754.
- 2nd Autobiography: Evonne Goolagong Cawley (2026). Only Ever Evonne. Allen & Unwin. ISBN 9781761473586.

Sporting positions
Preceded by Chris Evert	World No. 1; 26 April 1976 - 10 May 1976	Succeeded by Chris Evert
Awards
Preceded by Cardinal Sir Norman Gilroy	Australian of the Year Award; 1971	Succeeded by Shane Gould
