= 1972 World Championship Tennis circuit =

Professional male tennis circuit

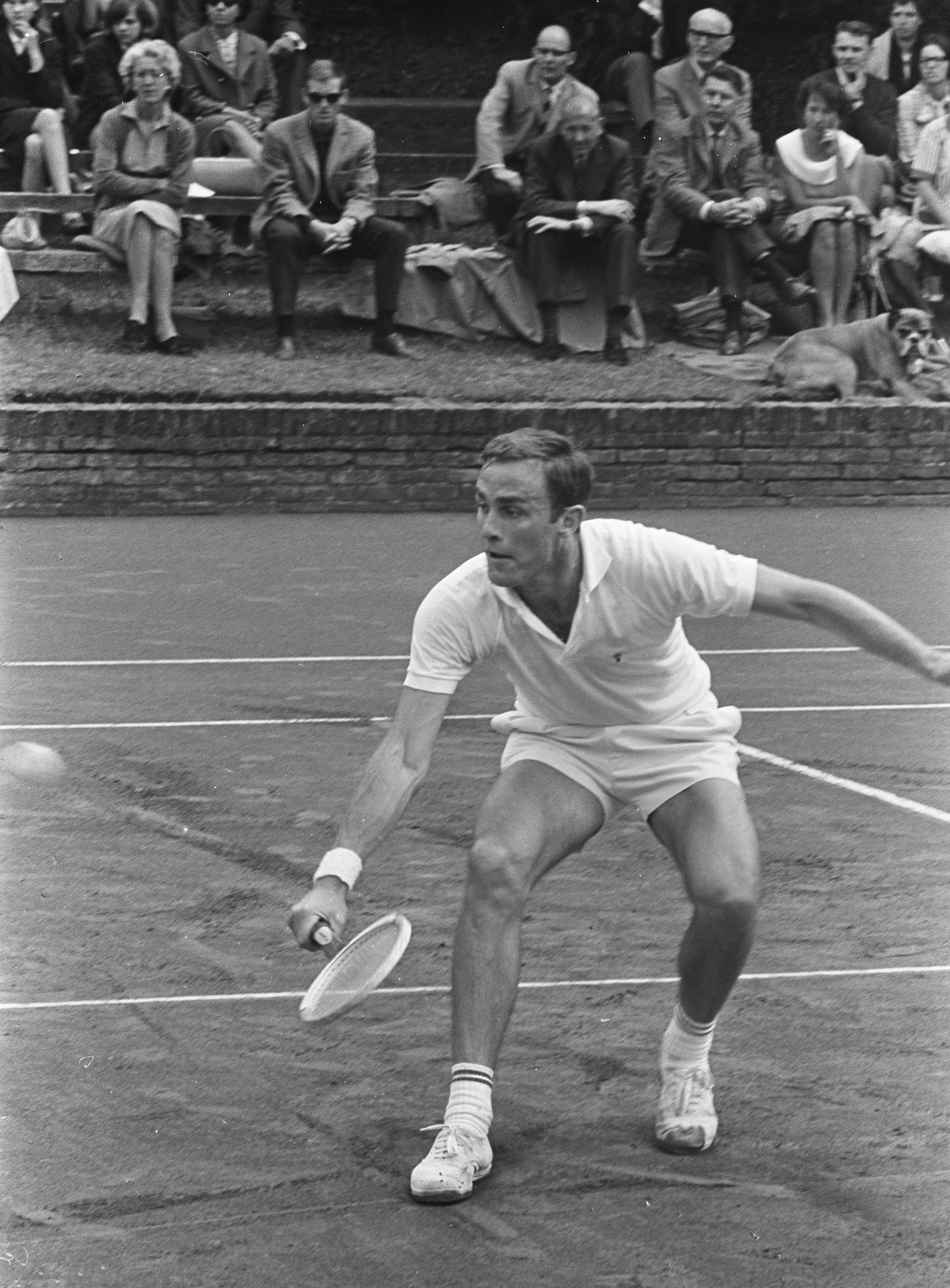
- Newcombe won 6 tour titles

Details
- Duration: 6 February 1972 – 26 November 1972
- Edition: 5th
- Tournaments: 25

Achievements (singles)
- Most titles: (Australia) John Newcombe (6)
- Most finals: (Australia) Rod Laver (7) (Australia) Ken Rosewall (7)
- Points leader: (Australia) John Newcombe

The 1972 World Championship Tennis circuit was one of the two rival professional male tennis circuits of 1972. It was organized by World Championship Tennis (WCT). The circuit included twenty-three regular events, and two circuit finals, one taking place in May, counting for the second half of the 1971 season, and the first part of the 1972 season, and a smaller one taking place in November, counting for the second half of the 1972 season, from July through November.

== Schedule ==
This is the complete schedule of events on the 1972 WCT circuit, with player progression documented until the quarterfinals stage.

Key

WCT Finals
Regular series

=== February ===
Week	Tournament	Champions	Runners-up	Semifinalists	Quarterfinalists
2 Feb	Fidelity WCT; Richmond, United States; Regular series Carpet (i) – $50,000 – 32S/16D; Singles – Doubles	(Australia) Rod Laver; 2–6, 6–3, 7–5, 6–3	(South Africa) Cliff Drysdale	(United States) Arthur Ashe (Australia) John Newcombe	(United States) Robert Lutz (Australia) Roy Emerson (United States) Charlie Pasarell (United Kingdom) Roger Taylor
2 Feb	Fidelity WCT; Richmond, United States; Regular series Carpet (i) – $50,000 – 32S/16D; Singles – Doubles	(Netherlands) Tom Okker (United States) Marty Riessen; 7–6, 7–6	(Australia) John Newcombe (Australia) Tony Roche	(United States) Arthur Ashe (Australia) John Newcombe	(United States) Robert Lutz (Australia) Roy Emerson (United States) Charlie Pasarell (United Kingdom) Roger Taylor
8 Feb	U.S. Professional Indoor; Philadelphia, United States; Regular series Carpet (i) – $50,000 – 32S/16D; Singles – Doubles	(Australia) Rod Laver; 4–6, 6–2, 6–2, 6–2	(Australia) Ken Rosewall	(United States) Arthur Ashe (Netherlands) Tom Okker	(United States) Marty Riessen (South Africa) Cliff Drysdale (United States) Jeff Borowiak (United States) Robert Lutz
8 Feb	U.S. Professional Indoor; Philadelphia, United States; Regular series Carpet (i) – $50,000 – 32S/16D; Singles – Doubles	(United States) Arthur Ashe (United States) Robert Lutz; 6–3, 6–7, 6–3	(Australia) John Newcombe (Australia) Tony Roche	(United States) Arthur Ashe (Netherlands) Tom Okker	(United States) Marty Riessen (South Africa) Cliff Drysdale (United States) Jeff Borowiak (United States) Robert Lutz
20 Feb	Canadian Open (WCT); Toronto, Ontario, Canada; Regular series Carpet (i) – $50,000 – 32S/16D	(Australia) Rod Laver; 6–1, 6–4	(Australia) Ken Rosewall	(Netherlands) Tom Okker (United States) Charlie Pasarell	(United Kingdom) Roger Taylor (Australia) Roy Emerson (Australia) Fred Stolle (United States) Marty Riessen
20 Feb	Canadian Open (WCT); Toronto, Ontario, Canada; Regular series Carpet (i) – $50,000 – 32S/16D	(Australia) Bob Carmichael (Australia) Ray Ruffels; 6–4, 4–6, 6–4	(Australia) Roy Emerson (Australia) Rod Laver	(Netherlands) Tom Okker (United States) Charlie Pasarell	(United Kingdom) Roger Taylor (Australia) Roy Emerson (Australia) Fred Stolle (United States) Marty Riessen

=== March ===
Week	Tournament	Champions	Runners-up	Semifinalists	Quarterfinalists
5 Mar	Saga Bay Tennis Classic; Hollywood, United States; Regular series Hard – $50,000 – 32S/16D	(Australia) Ken Rosewall; 3–6, 6–2, 6–4	(South Africa) Cliff Drysdale	(Australia) Fred Stolle (United States) Charlie Pasarell	(United Kingdom) Roger Taylor (Egypt) Ismail El Shafei (United Kingdom) Mark Cox (United States) Arthur Ashe
5 Mar	Saga Bay Tennis Classic; Hollywood, United States; Regular series Hard – $50,000 – 32S/16D	(Netherlands) Tom Okker (United States) Marty Riessen; 7–5, 6–4	(Australia) Roy Emerson (Australia) Rod Laver	(Australia) Fred Stolle (United States) Charlie Pasarell	(United Kingdom) Roger Taylor (Egypt) Ismail El Shafei (United Kingdom) Mark Cox (United States) Arthur Ashe
16 Mar	Kemper International Tennis Tournament; Chicago, United States; Regular series Carpet (i) – $50,000 – 32S/16D	(Netherlands) Tom Okker; 4–6, 6–2, 6–3	(United States) Arthur Ashe	(United States) Robert Lutz (Australia) Ken Rosewall	(United States) Charlie Pasarell (United States) Marty Riessen (Australia) John Alexander (United States) Robert Lutz
16 Mar	Kemper International Tennis Tournament; Chicago, United States; Regular series Carpet (i) – $50,000 – 32S/16D	(Netherlands) Tom Okker (United States) Marty Riessen; 6–2, 6–3	(Australia) Roy Emerson (Australia) Rod Laver	(United States) Robert Lutz (Australia) Ken Rosewall	(United States) Charlie Pasarell (United States) Marty Riessen (Australia) John Alexander (United States) Robert Lutz
26 Mar	Macon International Tennis Tournament; Macon, United States; Regular series Carpet – $50,000 – 32S/16D	(United Kingdom) Mark Cox; 6–3, 6–7^{(9–11)}, 6–3	(Australia) Roy Emerson	(United Kingdom) Graham Stilwell (United Kingdom) Roger Taylor	(Socialist Federal Republic of Yugoslavia) Nikola Pilić (United States) Jeff Borowiak (Netherlands) Tom Okker (Australia) Phil Dent
26 Mar	Macon International Tennis Tournament; Macon, United States; Regular series Carpet – $50,000 – 32S/16D	(Australia) Roy Emerson (Netherlands) Tom Okker; 7–6, 6–2	(United Kingdom) Mark Cox (United Kingdom) Graham Stilwell	(United Kingdom) Graham Stilwell (United Kingdom) Roger Taylor	(Socialist Federal Republic of Yugoslavia) Nikola Pilić (United States) Jeff Borowiak (Netherlands) Tom Okker (Australia) Phil Dent

=== April ===
Week	Tournament	Champions	Runners-up	Semifinalists	Quarterfinalists
3 Apr	River Oaks Tennis Tournament; Houston, United States; Regular series Clay – $50,000 – 32S/16D; Singles – Doubles	(Australia) Rod Laver; 6–2, 6–4	(Australia) Ken Rosewall	(Netherlands) Tom Okker (United Kingdom) Roger Taylor	(Australia) William Bowrey (Australia) John Alexander (Australia) John Newcombe (Socialist Federal Republic of Yugoslavia) Nikola Pilić
3 Apr	River Oaks Tennis Tournament; Houston, United States; Regular series Clay – $50,000 – 32S/16D; Singles – Doubles	(Australia) Roy Emerson (Australia) Rod Laver; 6–3, 6–3	(Australia) Ken Rosewall (Australia) Fred Stolle	(Netherlands) Tom Okker (United Kingdom) Roger Taylor	(Australia) William Bowrey (Australia) John Alexander (Australia) John Newcombe (Socialist Federal Republic of Yugoslavia) Nikola Pilić
9 Apr	Rothmans International Quebec; Quebec City, Canada; Regular series Carpet (i) – $50,000 – 32S/16D	(United States) Marty Riessen; 7–5, 6–2, 7–5	(Australia) Rod Laver	(South Africa) Cliff Drysdale (United States) Arthur Ashe	(United States) Charlie Pasarell (United Kingdom) Roger Taylor (Australia) Roy Emerson (Australia) Ken Rosewall
9 Apr	Rothmans International Quebec; Quebec City, Canada; Regular series Carpet (i) – $50,000 – 32S/16D	(Australia) Bob Carmichael (Australia) Ray Ruffels; 4–6, 6–3, 7–5	(Australia) Terry Addison (Australia) John Alexander	(South Africa) Cliff Drysdale (United States) Arthur Ashe	(United States) Charlie Pasarell (United Kingdom) Roger Taylor (Australia) Roy Emerson (Australia) Ken Rosewall
18 Apr	Charlotte Tennis Classic; Charlotte, United States; Regular series Clay – $50,000 – 32S/16D; Singles – Doubles	(Australia) Ken Rosewall; 2–6, 6–2, 6–2	(United States) Cliff Richey	(South Africa) Cliff Drysdale (Australia) John Alexander	(United Kingdom) Mark Cox (Australia) William Bowrey (Netherlands) Tom Okker (United States) Marty Riessen
18 Apr	Charlotte Tennis Classic; Charlotte, United States; Regular series Clay – $50,000 – 32S/16D; Singles – Doubles	(Netherlands) Tom Okker (United States) Marty Riessen; 6–4, 4–6, 7–6	(Australia) John Newcombe (Australia) Tony Roche	(South Africa) Cliff Drysdale (Australia) John Alexander	(United Kingdom) Mark Cox (Australia) William Bowrey (Netherlands) Tom Okker (United States) Marty Riessen
24 Apr	United Bank Classic; Denver, United States; Regular series Carpet (i) – $50,000 – 32S; Singles	(Australia) Rod Laver; 4–6, 6–3, 6–4	(United States) Marty Riessen	(Australia) Roy Emerson (Netherlands) Tom Okker	(United States) Robert Lutz (Australia) John Newcombe (United States) Arthur Ashe (Australia) John Alexander
24 Apr	United Bank Classic; Denver, United States; Regular series Carpet (i) – $50,000 – 32S; Singles	(Australia) Roy Emerson (Australia) Rod Laver; 1–6, 6–4, 6–3	(South Africa) Cliff Drysdale (United Kingdom) Roger Taylor	(Australia) Roy Emerson (Netherlands) Tom Okker	(United States) Robert Lutz (Australia) John Newcombe (United States) Arthur Ashe (Australia) John Alexander

=== May ===
Week	Tournament	Champions	Runners-up	Semifinalists	Quarterfinalists
1 May	Alan King Tennis Classic; Las Vegas, United States; Regular series Hard – $50,000 – 32S/16D	(Australia) John Newcombe; 6–3, 6–4	(South Africa) Cliff Drysdale	(United States) Marty Riessen (United States) Frank Froehling	(Australia) Rod Laver (United Kingdom) Roger Taylor (Netherlands) Tom Okker (Australia) Ken Rosewall
1 May	Alan King Tennis Classic; Las Vegas, United States; Regular series Hard – $50,000 – 32S/16D	(Australia) Roy Emerson (Australia) Rod Laver default	(Australia) John Newcombe (Australia) Tony Roche	(United States) Marty Riessen (United States) Frank Froehling	(Australia) Rod Laver (United Kingdom) Roger Taylor (Netherlands) Tom Okker (Australia) Ken Rosewall
8 May	WCT Finals; Dallas, United States; WCT Finals; Carpet (i) – $50,000 – 8S; Singles	(Australia) Ken Rosewall; 4–6, 6–0, 6–3, 6–7^{(3–7)}, 7–6^{(7–5)}	(Australia) Rod Laver	(United States) Marty Riessen (United States) Arthur Ashe	(Australia) John Newcombe (South Africa) Cliff Drysdale (Netherlands) Tom Okker (United States) Robert Lutz

=== July ===
Week	Tournament	Champions	Runners-up	Semifinalists	Quarterfinalists
1 Jul	Holton Tennis Classic; St. Louis, United States; Regular series Carpet (i) – $50,000 – 32S/16D	(Australia) John Newcombe; 6–3, 6–3	(Socialist Federal Republic of Yugoslavia) Nikola Pilić	(South Africa) Cliff Drysdale (United States) Charlie Pasarell	(Australia) Tony Roche (Netherlands) Tom Okker (United States) Marty Riessen (United States) Cliff Richey
1 Jul	Holton Tennis Classic; St. Louis, United States; Regular series Carpet (i) – $50,000 – 32S/16D	(Australia) John Newcombe (Australia) Tony Roche; 7–6, 6–2	(Australia) John Alexander (Australia) Phil Dent	(South Africa) Cliff Drysdale (United States) Charlie Pasarell	(Australia) Tony Roche (Netherlands) Tom Okker (United States) Marty Riessen (United States) Cliff Richey
17 Jul	Washington Star International; Washington, United States; Regular series Clay – $50,000 – 32S/16D; Singles – Doubles	(Australia) Tony Roche; 3–6, 7–6, 6–4	(United States) Marty Riessen	(Australia) Ray Ruffels (Australia) John Newcombe	(Australia) John Alexander (United States) Cliff Richey (United States) Arthur Ashe (Egypt) Ismail El Shafei
17 Jul	Washington Star International; Washington, United States; Regular series Clay – $50,000 – 32S/16D; Singles – Doubles	(Netherlands) Tom Okker (United States) Marty Riessen; 3–6, 6–3, 6–2	(Australia) John Newcombe (Australia) Tony Roche	(Australia) Ray Ruffels (Australia) John Newcombe	(Australia) John Alexander (United States) Cliff Richey (United States) Arthur Ashe (Egypt) Ismail El Shafei
24 Jul	First National Tennis Classic; Louisville, United States; Regular series Clay – $50,000 – 32S/16D	(United States) Arthur Ashe; 6–4, 6–4	(United Kingdom) Mark Cox	(Australia) John Newcombe (South Africa) Cliff Drysdale	(United States) Marty Riessen (Australia) Tony Roche (Netherlands) Tom Okker (Socialist Federal Republic of Yugoslavia) Nikola Pilić
24 Jul	First National Tennis Classic; Louisville, United States; Regular series Clay – $50,000 – 32S/16D	(Australia) John Alexander (United States) Phil Dent; 6–4, 6–3	(United States) Arthur Ashe (United States) Robert Lutz	(Australia) John Newcombe (South Africa) Cliff Drysdale	(United States) Marty Riessen (Australia) Tony Roche (Netherlands) Tom Okker (Socialist Federal Republic of Yugoslavia) Nikola Pilić

=== August ===
Week	Tournament	Champions	Runners-up	Semifinalists	Quarterfinalists
6 Aug	U.S. Pro Tennis Championships; Boston, United States; Hard – $50,000 – 32S/16D; Singles – Doubles	(United States) Robert Lutz; 6–4, 2–6, 6–4, 6–4	(Netherlands) Tom Okker	(South Africa) Cliff Drysdale (United States) Arthur Ashe	(Australia) Rod Laver (United States) Marty Riessen (Socialist Federal Republic of Yugoslavia) Nikola Pilić (Australia) Tony Roche
6 Aug	U.S. Pro Tennis Championships; Boston, United States; Hard – $50,000 – 32S/16D; Singles – Doubles	(Australia) Tony Roche (Australia) John Newcombe; 6–3, 1–6, 7–6	(United States) Arthur Ashe (United States) Robert Lutz	(South Africa) Cliff Drysdale (United States) Arthur Ashe	(Australia) Rod Laver (United States) Marty Riessen (Socialist Federal Republic of Yugoslavia) Nikola Pilić (Australia) Tony Roche
13 Aug	Cleveland Classic; Cleveland, United States; Regular series Hard – $50,000 – 32S/16D	(United Kingdom) Mark Cox; 6–3, 4–6, 4–6, 6–3, 6–4	(Australia) Ray Ruffels	(United Kingdom) Roger Taylor (South Africa) Cliff Drysdale	(Australia) Ken Rosewall (Socialist Federal Republic of Yugoslavia) Nikola Pilić (United States) Marty Riessen (Egypt) Ismail El Shafei
13 Aug	Cleveland Classic; Cleveland, United States; Regular series Hard – $50,000 – 32S/16D	(South Africa) Cliff Drysdale (United Kingdom) Roger Taylor; 7–6, 6–3	(United States) Frank Froehling (United States) Charlie Pasarell	(United Kingdom) Roger Taylor (South Africa) Cliff Drysdale	(Australia) Ken Rosewall (Socialist Federal Republic of Yugoslavia) Nikola Pilić (United States) Marty Riessen (Egypt) Ismail El Shafei
20 Aug	Colonial Nat'l Invitation Tennis Tournament; Fort Worth, United States; Regular series Hard – 32S/16D	(Australia) John Newcombe; 5–7, 1–6, 7–5, 6–4, 6–4	(Australia) Ken Rosewall	(Netherlands) Tom Okker (United States) Arthur Ashe	(Australia) John Alexander (Australia) Tony Roche (United Kingdom) Graham Stilwell (United States) Marty Riessen
20 Aug	Colonial Nat'l Invitation Tennis Tournament; Fort Worth, United States; Regular series Hard – 32S/16D	(Netherlands) Tom Okker (United States) Marty Riessen; 6–2, 6–2	(Australia) Ken Rosewall (Australia) Fred Stolle	(Netherlands) Tom Okker (United States) Arthur Ashe	(Australia) John Alexander (Australia) Tony Roche (United Kingdom) Graham Stilwell (United States) Marty Riessen

=== September ===
Week	Tournament	Champions	Runners-up	Semifinalists	Quarterfinalists
11 Sep	Rothmans International; Montreal, Quebec, Canada; Regular series Hard – 32S/16D	(United States) Arthur Ashe; 7–5, 4–6, 6–2, 6–3	(Australia) Roy Emerson	(Egypt) Ismail El Shafei (Netherlands) Tom Okker	(Australia) John Newcombe (United States) Marty Riessen (South Africa) Cliff Drysdale (United States) Cliff Richey
11 Sep	Rothmans International; Montreal, Quebec, Canada; Regular series Hard – 32S/16D	(Netherlands) Tom Okker (United States) Marty Riessen; 6–1, 4–6, 7–6	(South Africa) Bob Maud (Australia) Ken Rosewall	(Egypt) Ismail El Shafei (Netherlands) Tom Okker	(Australia) John Newcombe (United States) Marty Riessen (South Africa) Cliff Drysdale (United States) Cliff Richey

=== October ===
Week	Tournament	Champions	Runners-up	Semifinalists	Quarterfinalists
1 Oct	Redwood Bank Pacific Coast Championships; Alamo, United States; Regular series Hard – 32S/16D	(Australia) John Newcombe; 6–1, 6–1, 7–5	(South Africa) Cliff Drysdale	(Netherlands) Tom Okker (United States) Arthur Ashe	(Australia) Terry Addison (United Kingdom) Mark Cox (Australia) John Alexander (Australia) Roy Emerson
1 Oct	Redwood Bank Pacific Coast Championships; Alamo, United States; Regular series Hard – 32S/16D	(Netherlands) Tom Okker (United States) Marty Riessen; 7–6, 6–4	(Egypt) Ismail El Shafei (New Zealand) Brian Fairlie	(Netherlands) Tom Okker (United States) Arthur Ashe	(Australia) Terry Addison (United Kingdom) Mark Cox (Australia) John Alexander (Australia) Roy Emerson
22 Oct	Rothmans International; Vancouver, British Columbia, Canada; Regular series Carpet – 32S/16D	(Australia) John Newcombe; 6–7, 7–6, 7–6, 7–5	(United States) Marty Riessen	(United Kingdom) Mark Cox (United States) Robert Lutz	(Australia) Roy Emerson (Netherlands) Tom Okker (New Zealand) Brian Fairlie (United States) Arthur Ashe
22 Oct	Rothmans International; Vancouver, British Columbia, Canada; Regular series Carpet – 32S/16D	(Australia) John Newcombe (Australia) Fred Stolle; 7–6, 6–0	(South Africa) Cliff Drysdale (Australia) Allan Stone	(United Kingdom) Mark Cox (United States) Robert Lutz	(Australia) Roy Emerson (Netherlands) Tom Okker (New Zealand) Brian Fairlie (United States) Arthur Ashe
29 Oct	Canada Dry International; Essen, West Germany; Regular series Carpet (i) – 32S/16D	(Socialist Federal Republic of Yugoslavia) Nikola Pilić; 4–6, 6–4, 3–6, 6–4, 7–6	(United States) Robert Lutz	(United States) Cliff Richey (Egypt) Ismail El Shafei	(Australia) John Newcombe (West Germany) Wilhelm Bungert (Netherlands) Tom Okker (United States) Arthur Ashe

=== November ===
Week	Tournament	Champions	Runners-up	Semifinalists	Quarterfinalists
5 Nov	Swedish Pro Tennis Championships; Gothenburg, Sweden; Regular series Carpet (i) – $50,000 – 32S/16D; Singles – Doubles	(Australia) John Newcombe; 6–0, 6–3, 6–1	(Australia) Roy Emerson	(Netherlands) Tom Okker (United Kingdom) Mark Cox	(Australia) Allan Stone (United Kingdom) Roger Taylor (Pakistan) Haroon Rahim (United States) Jeff Borowiak
5 Nov	Swedish Pro Tennis Championships; Gothenburg, Sweden; Regular series Carpet (i) – $50,000 – 32S/16D; Singles – Doubles	(Netherlands) Tom Okker (United States) Marty Riessen; 6–2, 7–6	(Egypt) Ismail El Shafei (New Zealand) Brian Fairlie	(Netherlands) Tom Okker (United Kingdom) Mark Cox	(Australia) Allan Stone (United Kingdom) Roger Taylor (Pakistan) Haroon Rahim (United States) Jeff Borowiak
18 Nov	Rotterdam Indoors; Rotterdam, Netherlands; Regular series Carpet (i) – $50,000 – 32S/16D; Singles – Doubles	(United States) Arthur Ashe; 3–6, 6–2, 6–1	(Netherlands) Tom Okker	(Australia) John Newcombe (United Kingdom) Mark Cox	(United States) Charlie Pasarell (United States) Robert Lutz (United Kingdom) Robin Drysdale (United States) Marty Riessen
18 Nov	Rotterdam Indoors; Rotterdam, Netherlands; Regular series Carpet (i) – $50,000 – 32S/16D; Singles – Doubles	(Australia) Roy Emerson (Australia) John Newcombe; 6–2, 6–3	(United States) Arthur Ashe (United States) Robert Lutz	(Australia) John Newcombe (United Kingdom) Mark Cox	(United States) Charlie Pasarell (United States) Robert Lutz (United Kingdom) Robin Drysdale (United States) Marty Riessen
26 Nov	WCT Winter Finals; Rome, Italy; WCT Finals; Carpet (i) – $25,000 – 8S; Singles	(United States) Arthur Ashe; 6–2, 3–6, 6–3, 3–6, 7–6	(United States) Robert Lutz	(Netherlands) Tom Okker (South Africa) Cliff Drysdale	(Socialist Federal Republic of Yugoslavia) Nikola Pilić (United States) Marty Riessen (United Kingdom) Mark Cox (Australia) John Newcombe

== Statistical information ==
These tables present the number of singles (S), and doubles (D) titles won by each player and each nation during the season, within all the tournament categories of the 1972 WCT circuit: the WCT Finals, and the regular series tournaments. The players/nations are sorted by: 1) total number of titles (a doubles title won by two players representing the same nation counts as only one win for the nation); 2) importance of those titles (a WCT Finals win equalling two regular tournaments wins); 3) a singles > doubles hierarchy; 4) alphabetical order (by family names for players).

=== Titles won by player ===
Total titles	Player	Finals	Regular series		All titles	
Total titles	Player	S	S	D	S	D
10	(Australia) John Newcombe		6	4	6	4
10	(Netherlands) Tom Okker		1	9	1	9
10	(United States) Marty Riessen		1	9	1	9
7	(Australia) Rod Laver		5	2	5	2
5	(United States) Arthur Ashe	1	3	1	4	1
3	(Australia) Ken Rosewall	1	2		3	0
3	(Australia) Tony Roche		1	2	1	2
3	(Australia) Roy Emerson			3	0	3
2	(United States) Robert Lutz		1	1	1	1
2	(Australia) Bob Carmichael			2	0	2
2	(Australia) Ray Ruffels			2	0	2
1	(United Kingdom) Mark Cox		1		1	0
1	(Socialist Federal Republic of Yugoslavia) Nikola Pilić		1		1	0
1	(United States) Stan Smith		1		1	0
1	(Australia) John Alexander			1	0	1
1	(United States) Jimmy Connors			1	0	1
1	(United States) Phil Dent			1	0	1
1	(South Africa) Cliff Drysdale			1	0	1
1	(United States) Pancho Gonzales			1	0	1
1	(Australia) Fred Stolle			1	0	1
1	(United Kingdom) Roger Taylor			1	0	1

=== Titles won by nation ===
Total titles	Nation	Finals	Regular series		All titles	
Total titles	Nation	S	S	D	S	D
22	Australia	1	13	8	14	8
19	United States	1	6	12	7	12
10	Netherlands		1	9	1	9
2	United Kingdom		1	1	1	1
1	Yugoslavia		1		1	0
1	South Africa			1	0	1

== Standings ==
These are the standings of the top twenty singles players on the WCT circuit, at the end of the 1971 World Championship Tennis circuit, and after each edition of the WCT Finals in the 1972 season.

1971 Standings
#	Player
1	(Australia) Rod Laver
2	(Netherlands) Tom Okker
3	(Australia) Ken Rosewall
4	(South Africa) Cliff Drysdale
5	(United States) Arthur Ashe
6	(Australia) John Newcombe
7	(United States) Marty Riessen
8	(United States) Robert Lutz
9	(Australia) Roy Emerson
10	(Spain) Andrés Gimeno
11	(United States) Charlie Pasarell
12	(Australia) John Alexander
13	(United States) Dennis Ralston
14	(Australia) Ray Ruffels
=	(Egypt) Ismail El Shafei
=	(Socialist Federal Republic of Yugoslavia) Nikola Pilić
17	(South Africa) Bob Maud
18	(United Kingdom) Mark Cox
19	(United Kingdom) Roger Taylor
20	(Australia) Fred Stolle

1972 Standings (May)
#	Player
1	(Australia) Rod Laver
2	(Australia) Ken Rosewall
3	(Netherlands) Tom Okker
4	(South Africa) Cliff Drysdale
5	(United States) Marty Riessen
6	(United States) Arthur Ashe
7	(United States) Robert Lutz
8	(Australia) John Newcombe
9	(Australia) Roy Emerson
=	(United States) Charlie Pasarell
11	(Australia) John Alexander
12	(United Kingdom) Roger Taylor
13	(Spain) Andrés Gimeno
14	(United Kingdom) Mark Cox
15	(United States) Jeff Borowiak
16	(Australia) Fred Stolle
=	(Socialist Federal Republic of Yugoslavia) Nikola Pilić
18	(Egypt) Ismail El Shafei
19	(Australia) Bob Carmichael
20	(Australia) Ray Ruffels

1972 Standings (November)
#	Player
1	(Australia) John Newcombe
2	(United States) Arthur Ashe
3	(Netherlands) Tom Okker
4	(United Kingdom) Mark Cox
5	(South Africa) Cliff Drysdale
=	(United States) Marty Riessen
7	(United States) Robert Lutz
=	(Socialist Federal Republic of Yugoslavia) Nikola Pilić
9	(Australia) Roy Emerson
=	(Australia) Tony Roche
=	(Egypt) Ismail El Shafei
12	(United States) Cliff Richey
13	(United States) Charlie Pasarell
14	(Australia) Ray Ruffels
15	(Australia) Ken Rosewall
=	(United Kingdom) Roger Taylor
17	(Australia) John Alexander
18	(Australia) Bob Carmichael
=	(Australia) Allan Stone
=	(Pakistan) Haroon Rahim
=	(United States) Jeff Borowiak

== See also ==
- 1972 Grand Prix circuit
- 1972 USLTA Indoor Circuit
- Association of Tennis Professionals
- International Tennis Federation
