= 1972 Rotterdam Indoors =

- Date: 12–18 November
- Edition: 1st
- Category: World Championship Tennis
- Prize money: $50,000
- Surface: Carpet / indoor
- Location: Rotterdam, Netherlands
- Venue: Rotterdam Ahoy

Champions

Singles
- (United States) Arthur Ashe

Doubles
- (Australia) Roy Emerson / (Australia) John Newcombe
- Rotterdam Indoors

The 1972 Rotterdam Indoors was a men's tennis tournament played on indoor carpet courts. It was the inaugural edition of the event known that year as the Rotterdam Indoors, and was part of the 1972 World Championship Tennis circuit. It took place at the Rotterdam Ahoy indoor sporting arena in Rotterdam, Netherlands, from 12 November through 18 November 1972. Second-seeded Arthur Ashe won the singles title.

The singles field included Toronto, Las Vegas, St. Louis, Fort Worth, Alamo, Vancouver and Gothenburg WCT champion John Newcombe, US Open runner-up, Louisville and Montreal WCT titlist Arthur Ashe, and Chicago WCT winner, Boston WCT and Stockholm finalist Tom Okker. Also lined up were Briton Robin Drysdale, Cleveland WCT champion Mark Cox, Robert Lutz, Marty Riessen and Nikola Pilić.

== Finals ==
=== Singles ===
(United States) Arthur Ashe defeated (Netherlands) Tom Okker, 3–6, 6–2, 6–1

- It was Arthur Ashe's 3rd title of the year, and his 11th overall. It was his 3rd WCT title of the year, and overall.

=== Doubles ===
(Australia) Roy Emerson / (Australia) John Newcombe defeated (United States) Arthur Ashe / (United States) Robert Lutz, 6–2, 6–3
