= 1973 Charlotte Tennis Classic =

- Date: April 17–22
- Edition: 3rd
- Category: World Championship Tennis
- Draw: 32S / 16D
- Prize money: $50,000
- Surface: Clay / outdoor
- Location: Charlotte, North Carolina, U.S.
- Venue: Olde Providence Racquet Club

Champions

Singles
- (Australia) Ken Rosewall

Doubles
- (Netherlands) Tom Okker / (United States) Marty Riessen
← 1972 ·	Carolinas International Tennis Tournament	· 1974 →

The 1973 Charlotte Tennis Classic, also known by its sponsored name North Carolina National Bank Tennis Classic, was a men's tennis tournament played on outdoor clay courts that was part of group B of the World Championship Tennis (WCT) circuit. It was the third edition of the tournament and was held from April 17 through April 22, 1973 at the Julian J. Clark Tennis Stadium on the grounds of the Olde Providence Racquet Club in Charlotte, North Carolina in the United States. First-seeded Ken Rosewall won his second successive singles title at the event and earned $10,000 first-prize money.

== Finals ==
=== Singles ===
(Australia) Ken Rosewall defeated (United States) Arthur Ashe 6–3, 7–6^{(7–1)}

=== Doubles ===
(Netherlands) Tom Okker / (United States) Marty Riessen defeated (United States) Tom Gorman / (United States) Erik van Dillen 7–6, 3–6, 6–3
