= 1972 River Oaks Tennis Tournament =

- Date: April 3–9
- Edition: 38th
- Category: World Championship Tennis (WCT)
- Draw: 31S / 14D
- Prize money: $50,000
- Surface: Clay / outdoor
- Location: Houston, Texas, U.S.
- Venue: River Oaks Country Club

Champions

Singles
- (Australia) Rod Laver

Doubles
- (Australia) Roy Emerson / (Australia) Rod Laver
- River Oaks International Tennis Tournament

The 1972 River Oaks Tennis Tournament, also known as the River Oaks Invitational, was a men's tennis tournament played on outdoor clay courts at the River Oaks Country Club in Houston, Texas in the United States. It was the 38th edition of the tournament and was held from April 3 through April 9, 1972. The tournament was part of the 1972 World Championship Tennis circuit and offered total prize money of $50,000. The singles title was won by first-seeded Rod Laver who earned $10,000 first-prize money.

== Finals ==
=== Singles ===
(Australia) Rod Laver defeated (Australia) Ken Rosewall 6–2, 6–4

=== Doubles ===
(Australia) Roy Emerson / (Australia) Rod Laver defeated (Australia) Ken Rosewall / (Australia) Fred Stolle 6–3, 6–3

== See also ==
- Laver–Rosewall rivalry
