= 1972 Swedish Pro Tennis Championships – Singles =

Singles
- 1972 Swedish Pro Tennis Championships

Final
- Champion: (Australia) John Newcombe
- Runner-up: (Australia) Roy Emerson
- Score: 6–0, 6–3, 6–1

Details
- Draw: 32

Events
Singles	Doubles
Swedish Pro Tennis Championships	· 1973 →

The 1972 Swedish Pro Tennis Championships – Singles was an event of the 1972 Swedish Pro Tennis Championships men's tennis tournament played at the Scandinavium in Gothenburg, Sweden from 30 October until 5 November 1972. The draw consisted of 32 players. John Newcombe was the defending singles champion. He retained the singles title, defeating Roy Emerson in the final, 6–0, 6–3, 6–1.

== Seeds ==
Seeds unavailable.

== Draw ==
=== Key ===
- Q = Qualifier
- WC = Wild card
- LL = Lucky loser
- Alt = Alternate
- SE = Special exempt
- PR = Protected ranking
- ITF = ITF entry
- JE = Junior exempt
- w/o = Walkover
- r = Retired
- d = Defaulted
- SR = Special ranking

=== Finals ===
Semifinals
(Australia) John Newcombe	6	7
(Netherlands) Tom Okker	4	5
(Australia) Roy Emerson	6	6
(United Kingdom) Mark Cox	1	3

Final
(Australia) John Newcombe	6	6	6
(Australia) Roy Emerson	0	3	1

=== Top half ===
First round
(Australia) J Newcombe	6	6
(United States) T Leonard	3	2
(United States) D Stockton	6	6
(Australia) B Carmichael	3	1
(Australia) A Stone	6	6
(United States) F Froehling	2	4
(United States) M Riessen	6	4	6
(United States) R Barth	2	6	1
(Netherlands) T Okker	6	6
(Sweden) K Johansson	1	3
(Egypt) I El Shafei	7	7
(Australia) J Alexander	6	5
(Socialist Federal Republic of Yugoslavia) N Pilić	6	6
(Australia) F Stolle	3	2
(United Kingdom) R Taylor	6	7
(Sweden) ON Bengtson	3	6

Second round
(Australia) J Newcombe	6	7	6
(United States) D Stockton	7	6	1
(Australia) A Stone	6	6
(United States) M Riessen	1	0
(Netherlands) T Okker	6	6
(Egypt) I El Shafei	1	0
(Socialist Federal Republic of Yugoslavia) N Pilić	4	3
(United Kingdom) R Taylor	6	6

Quarterfinals
(Australia) J Newcombe	6	7
(Australia) A Stone	3	6
(Netherlands) T Okker	6	6
(United Kingdom) R Taylor	3	4

Semifinals
(Australia) J Newcombe	6	7
(Netherlands) T Okker	4	5

=== Bottom half ===
First round
(Pakistan) H Rahim	6	6
(United Kingdom) G Battrick	4	4
(United States) R Lutz	6	6
(South Africa) R Maud	2	2
(Australia) R Emerson	6	6
(Australia) T Addison	2	3
(South Africa) C Drysdale	6	4	6
(Australia) P Dent	4	6	1
(United States) C Pasarell	6	4
(Sweden) B Borg	7	6
(United Kingdom) M Cox	7	7
(New Zealand) B Fairlie	6	6
(United States) J Borowiak	6	3	7
(United States) A Ashe	1	6	6
(United States) C Richey	6	6
(United Kingdom) G Stilwell	4	4

Second round
(Pakistan) H Rahim	6	7
(United States) R Lutz	2	6
(Australia) R Emerson	6	6
(South Africa) C Drysdale	2	4
(Sweden) B Borg	3	7	4
(United Kingdom) M Cox	6	6	6
(United States) J Borowiak	6	2	7
(United States) C Richey	4	6	6

Quarterfinals
(Pakistan) H Rahim	4	6	6
(Australia) R Emerson	6	4	7
(United Kingdom) M Cox	7	6
(United States) J Borowiak	6	2

Semifinals
(Australia) R Emerson	6	6
(United Kingdom) M Cox	1	3
