= 1972 Swedish Pro Tennis Championships – Doubles =

Doubles
- 1972 Swedish Pro Tennis Championships

Final
- Champions: (Netherlands) Tom Okker (United States) Marty Riessen
- Runners-up: (Egypt) Ismail El Shafei (New Zealand) Brian Fairlie
- Score: 6–2, 7–6

Events
Singles	Doubles
Swedish Pro Tennis Championships	· 1973 →

Tom Okker and Marty Riessen won in the final 6–2, 7–6, against Ismail El Shafei and Brian Fairlie.

== Seeds ==
Seeds unavailable.

== Draw ==
=== Key ===
- Q = Qualifier
- WC = Wild card
- LL = Lucky loser
- Alt = Alternate
- SE = Special exempt
- PR = Protected ranking
- ITF = ITF entry
- JE = Junior exempt
- w/o = Walkover
- r = Retired
- d = Defaulted
- SR = Special ranking

=== Draw ===
First round
(United States) A Ashe (United States) R Lutz	7	7
(Sweden) ON Bengtson (Sweden) B Borg	6	6
(Australia) R Emerson (Sweden) K Johansson	7	6
(Socialist Federal Republic of Yugoslavia) N Pilić (Australia) A Stone	5	4
(Egypt) I El Shafei (New Zealand) B Fairlie	w/o
(Australia) J Newcombe (Australia) F Stolle
(South Africa) C Drysdale (United Kingdom) R Taylor	7	7
(Australia) T Addison (Australia) B Carmichael	5	6
(Australia) J Alexander (Australia) P Dent	6	6	7
(United States) J Borowiak (Pakistan) H Rahim	7	4	5
(United Kingdom) M Cox (United Kingdom) G Stilwell	1	6	7
(United States) R Barth (United States) T Leonard	6	4	6
(South Africa) R Maud (United States) D Stockton	7	6	7
(United States) F Froehling (United States) C Pasarell	5	7	6
(Netherlands) T Okker (United States) M Riessen	6	6
(United Kingdom) G Battrick (United States) C Richey	4	3

Quarterfinals
(United States) A Ashe (United States) R Lutz
(Australia) R Emerson (Sweden) K Johansson	w/o
(Egypt) I El Shafei (New Zealand) B Fairlie	4	7	6
(South Africa) C Drysdale (United Kingdom) R Taylor	6	6	4
(Australia) J Alexander (Australia) P Dent	6	6
(United Kingdom) M Cox (United Kingdom) G Stilwell	3	4
(South Africa) R Maud (United States) D Stockton	2	6
(Netherlands) T Okker (United States) M Riessen	6	7

Semifinals
(Australia) R Emerson (Sweden) K Johansson	2	3
(Egypt) I El Shafei (New Zealand) B Fairlie	6	6
(Australia) J Alexander (Australia) P Dent	5	7	4
(Netherlands) T Okker (United States) M Riessen	7	6	6

Final
(Egypt) I El Shafei (New Zealand) B Fairlie	2	6
(Netherlands) T Okker (United States) M Riessen	6	7
