= 1972 River Oaks Tennis Tournament – Singles =

Singles
- 1972 River Oaks Tennis Tournament

Final
- Champion: (Australia) Rod Laver
- Runner-up: (Australia) Ken Rosewall
- Score: 6–2, 6–4

Details
- Draw: 31
- Seeds: 12

Events
Singles	Doubles
← 1971 ·	River Oaks International	· 1973 →

The 1972 River Oaks Tennis Tournament – Singles was an event of the 1972 River Oaks Tennis Tournament men's tennis tournament and was held at the River Oaks Country Club in Houston, Texas in the United States from April 3 through April 9, 1972. Cliff Richey was the defending champion but did not compete in this edition. First-seeded Rod Laver won the singles title, defeating second-seeded Ken Rosewall in the final, 6–2, 6–4.

== Seeds ==
1. (Australia) Rod Laver (champion)
2. (Australia) Ken Rosewall (finals
3. (Netherlands) Tom Okker (semifinals)
4. (South Africa) Cliff Drysdale (first round)
5. (United States) Arthur Ashe (second round)
6. (United States) Bob Lutz (second round)
7. (United States) Marty Riessen (second round)
8. (United States) Charlie Pasarell (second round)
9. (Australia) John Newcombe (quarterfinals)
10. (Australia) Roy Emerson (first round)
11. (Australia) John Alexander (quarterfinals)
12. (United Kingdom) Roger Taylor (semifinals)

== Draw ==
=== Key ===
- Q = Qualifier
- WC = Wild card
- LL = Lucky loser
- Alt = Alternate
- SE = Special exempt
- PR = Protected ranking
- ITF = ITF entry
- JE = Junior exempt
- w/o = Walkover
- r = Retired
- d = Defaulted
- SR = Special ranking

=== Finals ===
Semifinals
1	(Australia) Rod Laver	6	6
3	(Netherlands) Tom Okker	2	1
12	(United Kingdom) Roger Taylor	6	3	4
2	(Australia) Ken Rosewall	4	6	6

Final
1	(Australia) Rod Laver	6	6
2	(Australia) Ken Rosewall	2	4

=== Top half ===
First round
1	(Australia) Rod Laver	6	7
(Australia) Fred Stolle	1	5
(South Africa) Bob Maud	w	o
(United States) Frank Froehling
7	(United States) Marty Riessen	6	6
(Australia) Ray Ruffels	4	1
6	(United States) Bob Lutz	3	6	6
(Australia) Allan Stone	6	3	3
11	(Australia) John Alexander	6	6
(New Zealand) Brian Fairlie	0	0
10	(Australia) Roy Emerson	3	1
(Australia) Tony Roche	6	6
3	(Netherlands) Tom Okker	6	6
(Australia) Bob Carmichael	1	0

Second round
1	(Australia) Rod Laver	6	6
(South Africa) Bob Maud	3	2
(Australia) Bill Bowrey	6	3	6
7	(United States) Marty Riessen	2	6	4
6	(United States) Bob Lutz	7	4	2
11	(Australia) John Alexander	6	6	6
(Australia) Tony Roche	4	7	6
3	(Netherlands) Tom Okker	6	5	7

Quarterfinals
1	(Australia) Rod Laver	6	7
(Australia) Bill Bowrey	2	5
11	(Australia) John Alexander	6	4
3	(Netherlands) Tom Okker	7	6

Semifinals
1	(Australia) Rod Laver	6	6
3	(Netherlands) Tom Okker	2	1

=== Bottom half ===
First round
4	(South Africa) Cliff Drysdale	3	2
(United Kingdom) Mark Cox	6	6
12	(United Kingdom) Roger Taylor	6	6
(United States) Roy Barth	3	1
9	(Australia) John Newcombe	6	7
(United States) Jeff Borowiak	2	5
8	(United States) Charlie Pasarell	5	6	6
(United States) Tom Leonard	7	4	3
5	(United States) Arthur Ashe	6	7
(Egypt) Ismail El Shafei	3	6
(Socialist Federal Republic of Yugoslavia) Niki Pilić	6	7
(Australia) Owen Davidson	2	6
(United Kingdom) Graham Stilwell	w	o
(Australia) Phil Dent
(Australia) Terry Addison	4	1
2	(Australia) Ken Rosewall	6	6

Second round
(United Kingdom) Mark Cox	6	4	4
12	(United Kingdom) Roger Taylor	1	6	6
9	(Australia) John Newcombe	6	7
8	(United States) Charlie Pasarell	3	5
5	(United States) Arthur Ashe	3	4
(Socialist Federal Republic of Yugoslavia) Niki Pilić	6	6
(United Kingdom) Graham Stilwell	4	4
2	(Australia) Ken Rosewall	6	6

Quarterfinals
12	(United Kingdom) Roger Taylor	6	6
9	(Australia) John Newcombe	4	3
(Socialist Federal Republic of Yugoslavia) Niki Pilić	3	5
2	(Australia) Ken Rosewall	6	7

Semifinals
12	(United Kingdom) Roger Taylor	6	3	4
2	(Australia) Ken Rosewall	4	6	6

== See also ==
- Laver–Rosewall rivalry
