= 1968 Pacific Coast International =

1968 Pacific Coast International Open
- Date: September 30 – October 6
- Edition: 80th
- Category: Grand Prix
- Surface: Hard / outdoor
- Location: Berkeley, US
- Venue: Berkeley Tennis Club

Champions

Women's singles
- (Australia) Margaret Court

Singles
- (United States) Stan Smith

Men's doubles
- (United States) Bob Lutz / (United States) Stan Smith

Women's doubles
- (Brazil) Maria Bueno / (United States) Margaret Court

Mixed doubles
- (Australia) Margaret Court / (United States) Stan Smith
← 1967 ·	Pacific Coast Championships	· 1969 →

The 1968 Pacific Coast International Open was a combined men's and women's tennis tournament played on outdoor hard courts at the Berkeley Tennis Club in Berkeley, California in the United States. It was the 80th edition of the tournament, the first one in the Open Era, and ran from September 30 through October 6, 1968. Stan Smith and Margaret Court won the singles titles.

== Finals ==
=== Men's singles ===
(United States) Stan Smith defeated (United States) Jim McManus 10–8, 6–1, 6–1

=== Women's singles ===
(Australia) Margaret Court defeated (Brazil) Maria Bueno 6–4, 7–5

=== Men's doubles ===
(United States) Bob Lutz / (United States) Stan Smith defeated (United States) Jim McManus / (United States) Jim Osborne 10–8, 11–9

=== Women's doubles ===
(Brazil) Maria Bueno / (Australia) Margaret Court defeated (South Africa) Maryna Godwin / (South Africa) Esmé Emmanuel 6–2, 6–4

=== Mixed's doubles ===
(Australia) Margaret Court / (United States) Stan Smith defeated (Australia) Judy Tegart / (United States) Jim McManus 8–10, 6–2, 6–2
