= 1972 Charlotte Tennis Classic – Singles =

Singles
- 1972 Charlotte Tennis Classic

Final
- Champion: (Australia) Ken Rosewall
- Runner-up: (United States) Cliff Richey
- Score: 2–6, 6–2, 6–2

Details
- Draw: 31
- Seeds: 12

Events
Singles	Doubles
- Carolinas International Tennis Tournament

The 1972 Charlotte Tennis Classic – Singles was an event of the 1972 Charlotte Tennis Classic tennis tournament played at the Julian J. Clark Tennis Stadium in Charlotte, North Carolina in the United States from April 18 through April 23, 1972. Arthur Ashe was the defending singles champion but lost in the first round. Second-seeded Ken Rosewall won the singles title, defeating unseeded Cliff Richey in the final, 2–6, 6–2, 6–2.

== Seeds ==
1. (Australia) Rod Laver (first round)
2. (Australia) Ken Rosewall (champion)
3. (Netherlands) Tom Okker (quarterfinals)
4. (South Africa) Cliff Drysdale (semifinali)
5. (United States) Arthur Ashe (first round)
6. (United States) Bob Lutz (second round)
7. (United States) Marty Riessen (quarterfinals)
8. (United States) Charlie Pasarell (second round)
9. (United States) John Newcombe (second round)
10. (Australia) Roy Emerson (second round)
11. (United Kingdom) Roger Taylor (second round)
12. (Australia) John Alexander (semifinals)

== Draw ==
Key

- Q = Qualifier
- WC = Wild card
- LL = Lucky loser
- Alt = Alternate
- ITF = ITF entry
- PR = Protected ranking
- SR = Special ranking
- SE = Special exempt
- JE = Junior exempt
- JR = Junior Accelerator Programme entrant
- CO = College Accelerator Programme entrant
- NG = Next Gen Accelerator Program entrant
- w/o = Walkover
- r = Retired
- d = Defaulted

=== Finals ===
Semifinals
(United States) Cliff Richey	6	6
4	(South Africa) Cliff Drysdale	2	3
12	(Australia) John Alexander	4	3
2	(Australia) Ken Rosewall	6	6

Final
(United States) Cliff Richey	6	3	2
2	(Australia) Ken Rosewall	2	6	6

=== Top half ===
First round
1	(Australia) Rod Laver	6	2	3
(United Kingdom) Mark Cox	4	6	6
(Socialist Federal Republic of Yugoslavia) Niki Pilić	6	6
(Australia) Ray Ruffels	3	3
(Australia) Fred Stolle	6	6
(Australia) Terry Addison	3	1
(United States) Cliff Richey	6	7
8	(United States) Charlie Pasarell	0	6
(Egypt) Ismail El Shafei	6	6
5	(United States) Arthur Ashe	4	1
(Australia) Bill Bowrey	6	7
(United States) Roy Barth	4	6
10	(Australia) Roy Emerson	6	6
(United States) Tom Leonard	3	0
(South Africa) Bob Maud	5	6	2
4	(South Africa) Cliff Drysdale	7	0	6

Second round
(United Kingdom) Mark Cox	4	6	7
(Socialist Federal Republic of Yugoslavia) Niki Pilić	6	4	6
(Australia) Fred Stolle	4	6	1
(United States) Cliff Richey	6	4	6
(Egypt) Ismail El Shafei	4	6	6
(Australia) Bill Bowrey	6	4	7
10	(Australia) Roy Emerson	4	3
4	(South Africa) Cliff Drysdale	6	6

Quarterfinals
(United Kingdom) Mark Cox	6	3	1
(United States) Cliff Richey	1	6	6
(Australia) Bill Bowrey	2	2
4	(South Africa) Cliff Drysdale	6	6

Semifinals
(United States) Cliff Richey	6	6
4	(South Africa) Cliff Drysdale	2	3

=== Bottom half ===
First round
3	(Netherlands) Tom Okker	6	6
(Australia) Tony Roche	4	2
11	(United Kingdom) Roger Taylor	6	7
(Australia) Owen Davidson	2	5
12	(Australia) John Alexander	6	7	6
(Australia) Allan Stone	7	6	1
6	(United States) Bob Lutz	6	6
(United States) Frank Froehling	1	3
(United Kingdom) Graham Stilwell	6	6
(United States) Jeff Borowiak	3	1
(New Zealand) Brian Fairlie	1	5
9	(Australia) John Newcombe	6	7
(Australia) Bob Carmichael	2	4
2	(Australia) Ken Rosewall	6	6

Second round
3	(Netherlands) Tom Okker	6	6	6
11	(United Kingdom) Roger Taylor	2	7	0
12	(Australia) John Alexander	3	6	6
6	(United States) Bob Lutz	6	3	2
7	(United States) Marty Riessen	5	6	6
(United Kingdom) Graham Stilwell	7	4	1
9	(Australia) John Newcombe	2	5
2	(Australia) Ken Rosewall	6	7

Quarterfinals
3	(Netherlands) Tom Okker	2	4
12	(Australia) John Alexander	6	6
7	(United States) Marty Riessen	2	0
2	(Australia) Ken Rosewall	6	6

Semifinals
12	(Australia) John Alexander	4	3
2	(Australia) Ken Rosewall	6	6
