= 1972 Swedish Pro Tennis Championships =

- Date: 30 October – 5 November
- Edition: 1st
- Category: World Championship Tennis
- Draw: 32S / 16D
- Prize money: $50,000
- Surface: Carpet / indoor
- Location: Gothenburg, Sweden
- Venue: Scandinavium

Champions

Singles
- (Australia) John Newcombe

Doubles
- (Netherlands) Tom Okker / (United States) Marty Riessen
Swedish Pro Tennis Championships	· 1973 →

The 1972 Swedish Pro Tennis Championships was a men's tennis tournament played on indoor carpet courts. It was the 1st edition of Swedish Pro Tennis Championships, and was part of the 1972 World Championship Tennis circuit. It took place at the Scandinavium in Gothenburg, Sweden, from 30 October until 5 November 1972.

The singles line up featured Toronto, Las Vegas, St. Louis, Fort Worth, Alamo and Vancouver WCT winner John Newcombe, US Open runner-up, Louisville and Montreal WCT champion Arthur Ashe, and Chicago WCT finalist, Boston WCT and Stockholm finalist Tom Okker. Also competing were Cleveland WCT winner Mark Cox, Richmond, Miami, Las Vegas and Alamo WCT runner-up Cliff Drysdale, Marty Riessen, Robert Lutz and Nikola Pilić.

== Finals ==
=== Singles ===
(Australia) John Newcombe defeated (Australia) Roy Emerson, 6–0, 6–3, 6–1

- It was Newcombe's 6th title of the year, and his 18th overall. It was his 6th WCT title of the year, and his 11th overall.

=== Doubles ===
(Netherlands) Tom Okker / (United States) Marty Riessen defeated (Egypt) Ismail El Shafei / (New Zealand) Brian Fairlie, 6–2, 7–6

== See also ==
- 1972 Swedish Open
- 1972 Stockholm Open
