= 1972 River Oaks Tennis Tournament – Doubles =

Doubles
- 1972 River Oaks Tennis Tournament

Final
- Champion: (Australia) Roy Emerson (Australia) Rod Laver
- Runner-up: (Australia) Ken Rosewall (Australia) Fred Stolle
- Score: 6–3, 6–3

Details
- Draw: 14

Events
Singles	Doubles
← 1971 ·	River Oaks International	· 1973 →

The 1972 River Oaks Tennis Tournament – Doubles was an event of the 1972 River Oaks Tennis Tournament men's tennis tournament and was held at the River Oaks Country Club in Houston, Texas in the United States from April 3 through April 9, 1972. Onny Parun and Milan Holeček were the defending doubles champion but did not take part in this edition. Roy Emerson and Rod Laver won the doubles title, defeating second-seeded Ken Rosewall and Fred Stolle in the final, 6–3, 6–3.

== Draw ==
=== Key ===
- Q = Qualifier
- WC = Wild card
- LL = Lucky loser
- Alt = Alternate
- SE = Special exempt
- PR = Protected ranking
- ITF = ITF entry
- JE = Junior exempt
- w/o = Walkover
- r = Retired
- d = Defaulted
- SR = Special ranking

First Round
(Netherlands) Tom Okker (United States) Marty Riessen	6	6
(South Africa) Cliff Drysdale (United Kingdom) Roger Taylor	2	2
(Egypt) Ismail El Shafei (New Zealand) Brian Fairlie	7	6
(Australia) John Alexander (United States) Charlie Pasarell	5	3
(Australia) Ken Rosewall (Australia) Fred Stolle	6	6
(Australia) John Newcombe (Australia) Tony Roche	3	4
(United States) Arthur Ashe (United States) Bob Lutz	6	7	6
(Australia) Bill Bowrey (Australia) Owen Davidson	7	6	4
(Australia) Bob Carmichael (Australia) Ray Ruffels	7	6
(United States) Roy Barth (United States) Tom Leonard	6	2
(United Kingdom) Mark Cox (United Kingdom) Graham Stilwell	6	6
(South Africa) Bob Maud (United States) Doug Stone	3	1

Quarterfinals
(United States) Jeff Borowiak (Socialist Federal Republic of Yugoslavia) Nikola Pilić	3	6	6
(Netherlands) Tom Okker (United States) Marty Riessen	6	3	4
(Egypt) Ismail El Shafei (New Zealand) Brian Fairlie	3	2
(Australia) Ken Rosewall (Australia) Fred Stolle	6	6
(United States) Arthur Ashe (United States) Bob Lutz	3	4
(Australia) Bob Carmichael (Australia) Ray Ruffels	6	6
(United Kingdom) Mark Cox (United Kingdom) Graham Stilwell	6	6	6
(Australia) Roy Emerson (Australia) Rod Laver	4	7	7

Semifinals
(United States) Jeff Borowiak (Socialist Federal Republic of Yugoslavia) Nikola Pilić	4	6
(Australia) Ken Rosewall (Australia) Fred Stolle	6	7
(Australia) Bob Carmichael (Australia) Ray Ruffels	6	3
(Australia) Roy Emerson (Australia) Rod Laver	7	6

Final
(Australia) Ken Rosewall (Australia) Fred Stolle	3	3
(Australia) Roy Emerson (Australia) Rod Laver	6	6
