= 1972 South African Open (tennis) =

- Date: 8–13 April
- Edition: 69th
- Category: Grand Prix A series
- Draw: 64S / 32D
- Surface: Hard / outdoor
- Location: Johannesburg, South Africa
- Venue: Ellis Park Tennis Stadium
- Attendance: 85,000

Champions

Men's singles
- (United States) Cliff Richey

Women's singles
- (Australia) Evonne Goolagong

Men's doubles
- (South Africa) Bob Hewitt / (South Africa) Frew McMillan

Women's doubles
- (Australia) Evonne Goolagong / (Australia) Helen Gourlay

Mixed doubles
- (United Kingdom) Virginia Wade / (Italy) Martin Mulligan
- South African Open

The 1972 South African Open, also known by its sponsored name South African Breweries Open, was a combined men's and women's tennis tournament played on outdoor hard courts at the Ellis Park Tennis Stadium in Johannesburg, South Africa that was part of the 1972 Commercial Union Assurance Grand Prix. It was the 69th edition of the tournament and was held from 8 April through 13 April 1972. The tournament had a record attendance of 85,000. World Championship Tennis (WCT) players were barred from participating in the event. Cliff Richey won the men's singles titles and the accompanying £2,570 first-prize money while Evonne Goolagong earned £1,030 first-prize money for her singles title.

== Finals ==
=== Men's singles ===
(United States) Cliff Richey defeated (Spain) Manuel Orantes 6–4, 7–5, 3–6, 6–4

=== Women's singles ===
(Australia) Evonne Goolagong defeated (United Kingdom) Virginia Wade 4–6, 6–3, 6–0

=== Men's doubles ===
(South Africa) Bob Hewitt / (South Africa) Frew McMillan defeated (France) Georges Goven / (South Africa) Ray Moore 6–2, 6–2, 6–4

=== Women's doubles ===
(Australia) Evonne Goolagong / (Australia) Helen Gourlay defeated (United Kingdom) Winnie Shaw / (United Kingdom) Joyce Williams 6–4, 6–4

=== Mixed doubles ===
(United Kingdom) Virginia Wade / (Italy) Martin Mulligan defeated (South Africa) Patricia Pretorius / (South Africa) Frew McMillan 6–0, 4–6, 6–4
