= 1972 Rotterdam Indoors – Doubles =

Doubles
- 1972 Rotterdam Indoors

Final
- Champions: (Australia) Roy Emerson (Australia) John Newcombe
- Runners-up: (United States) Arthur Ashe (United States) Robert Lutz
- Score: 6–2, 6–3

Details
- Draw: 14

Events
Singles	Doubles
- Rotterdam Indoors

Roy Emerson and John Newcombe won in the final 6–2, 6–3, against Arthur Ashe and Robert Lutz.

== Seeds ==
Seeds unavailable.

== Draw ==
Key

- Q = Qualifier
- WC = Wild card
- LL = Lucky loser
- Alt = Alternate
- ITF = ITF entry
- PR = Protected ranking
- SR = Special ranking
- SE = Special exempt
- JE = Junior exempt
- JR = Junior Accelerator Programme entrant
- CO = College Accelerator Programme entrant
- NG = Next Gen Accelerator Program entrant
- w/o = Walkover
- r = Retired
- d = Defaulted

=== Draw ===
First round
(United States) A Ashe (United States) R Lutz	6	2	6
(Australia) T Addison (Australia) B Carmichael	4	6	4
(United States) F Froehling (United States) C Pasarell	2	6	3
(United Kingdom) M Cox (United Kingdom) G Stilwell	6	4	6
(South Africa) C Drysdale (United Kingdom) R Taylor	6	6
(United Kingdom) G Battrick (United States) C Richey	1	2
(Socialist Federal Republic of Yugoslavia) N Pilić (Australia) A Stone	4	6	7
(Australia) J Alexander (Australia) P Dent	6	0	6
(United States) J Borowiak (Pakistan) H Rahim	6	3	7
(Egypt) I El Shafei (New Zealand) B Fairlie	2	6	6
(South Africa) R Maud (United States) D Stockton	7	6	6
(Netherlands) T Okker (United States) M Riessen	6	7	4

Quarterfinals
(United States) R Barth (United States) T Leonard	2	4
(United States) A Ashe (United States) R Lutz	6	6
(United States) F Froehling (United States) C Pasarell	6	6
(South Africa) C Drysdale (United Kingdom) R Taylor	3	4
(Socialist Federal Republic of Yugoslavia) N Pilić (Australia) A Stone	7	6
(United States) J Borowiak (Pakistan) H Rahim	6	4
(South Africa) R Maud (United States) D Stockton	3	6	3
(Australia) R Emerson (Australia) J Newcombe	6	3	6

Semifinals
(United States) A Ashe (United States) R Lutz	7	7
(United States) F Froehling (United States) C Pasarell	6	6
(Socialist Federal Republic of Yugoslavia) N Pilić (Australia) A Stone	5	3
(Australia) R Emerson (Australia) J Newcombe	7	6

Final
(United States) A Ashe (United States) R Lutz	2	3
(Australia) R Emerson (Australia) J Newcombe	6	6
