= 1972 Charlotte Tennis Classic – Doubles =

Doubles
- 1972 Charlotte Tennis Classic

Final
- Champion: (Netherlands) Tom Okker (United States) Marty Riessen
- Runner-up: (Australia) John Newcombe (Australia) Tony Roche
- Score: 6–4, 4–6, 7–6

Details
- Draw: 15

Events
Singles	Doubles
- Carolinas International Tennis Tournament

The 1972 Charlotte Tennis Classic – Doubles was an event of the 1972 Charlotte Tennis Classic tennis tournament played at the Julian J. Clark Tennis Stadium in Charlotte, North Carolina, in the United States from April 18 through April 23, 1972. Marty Riessen and Tony Roche were the defending champions, but did not compete together in this edition. Tom Okker and Marty Riessen won the doubles title, defeating John Newcombe and Tony Roche in the final, 6–4, 4–6, 7–6.

== Draw ==
Key

- Q = Qualifier
- WC = Wild card
- LL = Lucky loser
- Alt = Alternate
- ITF = ITF entry
- PR = Protected ranking
- SR = Special ranking
- SE = Special exempt
- JE = Junior exempt
- JR = Junior Accelerator Programme entrant
- CO = College Accelerator Programme entrant
- NG = Next Gen Accelerator Program entrant
- w/o = Walkover
- r = Retired
- d = Defaulted

First Round
(Netherlands) Tom Okker (United States) Marty Riessen	6	6
(Australia) John Alexander (Australia) Terry Addison	2	4
(Australia) Bill Bowrey (Australia) Owen Davidson	7	5	7
(United Kingdom) Mark Cox (United Kingdom) Graham Stilwell	5	7	6
(South Africa) Cliff Drysdale (United Kingdom) Roger Taylor	7	6
(United States) Arthur Ashe (United States) Bob Lutz	5	2
(Australia) Ken Rosewall (Australia) Fred Stolle	2	6	6
(United States) Roy Barth (United States) Tom Leonard	6	3	2
(Australia) John Newcombe (Australia) Tony Roche	7	6
(United States) Frank Froehling (United States) Charlie Pasarell	6	4
(United States) Jeff Borowiak (Socialist Federal Republic of Yugoslavia) Nikola Pilić	6	6
(South Africa) Bob Maud (United States) Doug Stone	2	4
(Egypt) Ismail El Shafei (New Zealand) Brian Fairlie	w/o
(Australia) Roy Emerson (Australia) Rod Laver

Quarterfinals
(Netherlands) Tom Okker (United States) Marty Riessen	3	6	6
(Australia) Bill Bowrey (Australia) Owen Davidson	6	3	4
(Australia) Bob Carmichael (Australia) Ray Ruffels	6	6	6
(South Africa) Cliff Drysdale (United Kingdom) Roger Taylor	4	7	3
(Australia) Ken Rosewall (Australia) Fred Stolle	4	7	3
(Australia) John Newcombe (Australia) Tony Roche	6	6	6
(United States) Jeff Borowiak (Socialist Federal Republic of Yugoslavia) Nikola Pilić	2	7	6
(Egypt) Ismail El Shafei (New Zealand) Brian Fairlie	6	5	1

Semifinals
(Netherlands) Tom Okker (United States) Marty Riessen	6	7
(Australia) Bob Carmichael (Australia) Ray Ruffels	3	5
(Australia) John Newcombe (Australia) Tony Roche	6	6
(United States) Jeff Borowiak (Socialist Federal Republic of Yugoslavia) Nikola Pilić	4	3

Final
(Netherlands) Tom Okker (United States) Marty Riessen	6	4	7
(Australia) John Newcombe (Australia) Tony Roche	4	6	6
