= 1972 Rotterdam Indoors – Singles =

Singles
- 1972 Rotterdam Indoors

Final
- Champion: (United States) Arthur Ashe
- Runner-up: (Netherlands) Tom Okker
- Score: 3–6, 6–2, 6–1

Details
- Draw: 32
- Seeds: 8

Events
Singles	Doubles
Rotterdam Indoors	· 1974 →

Arthur Ashe won the singles title of the 1972 Rotterdam Indoors defeating Tom Okker in the final 3–6, 6–2, 6–1. Mark Cox won the match for third place against John Newcombe 6–3, 6–4.

== Seeds ==
1. (Australia) John Newcombe (semifinals)
2. (United States) Arthur Ashe (champion)
3. (Netherlands) Tom Okker (final)
4. (United Kingdom) Robin Drysdale (quarterfinals)
5. (United Kingdom) Mark Cox (semifinals)
6. (United States) Robert Lutz (quarterfinals)
7. (United States) Marty Riessen (quarterfinals)
8. (Socialist Federal Republic of Yugoslavia) Nikola Pilić (first round)

== Draw ==
=== Key ===
- Q = Qualifier
- WC = Wild card
- LL = Lucky loser
- Alt = Alternate
- SE = Special exempt
- PR = Protected ranking
- ITF = ITF entry
- JE = Junior exempt
- w/o = Walkover
- r = Retired
- d = Defaulted
- SR = Special ranking

=== Finals ===
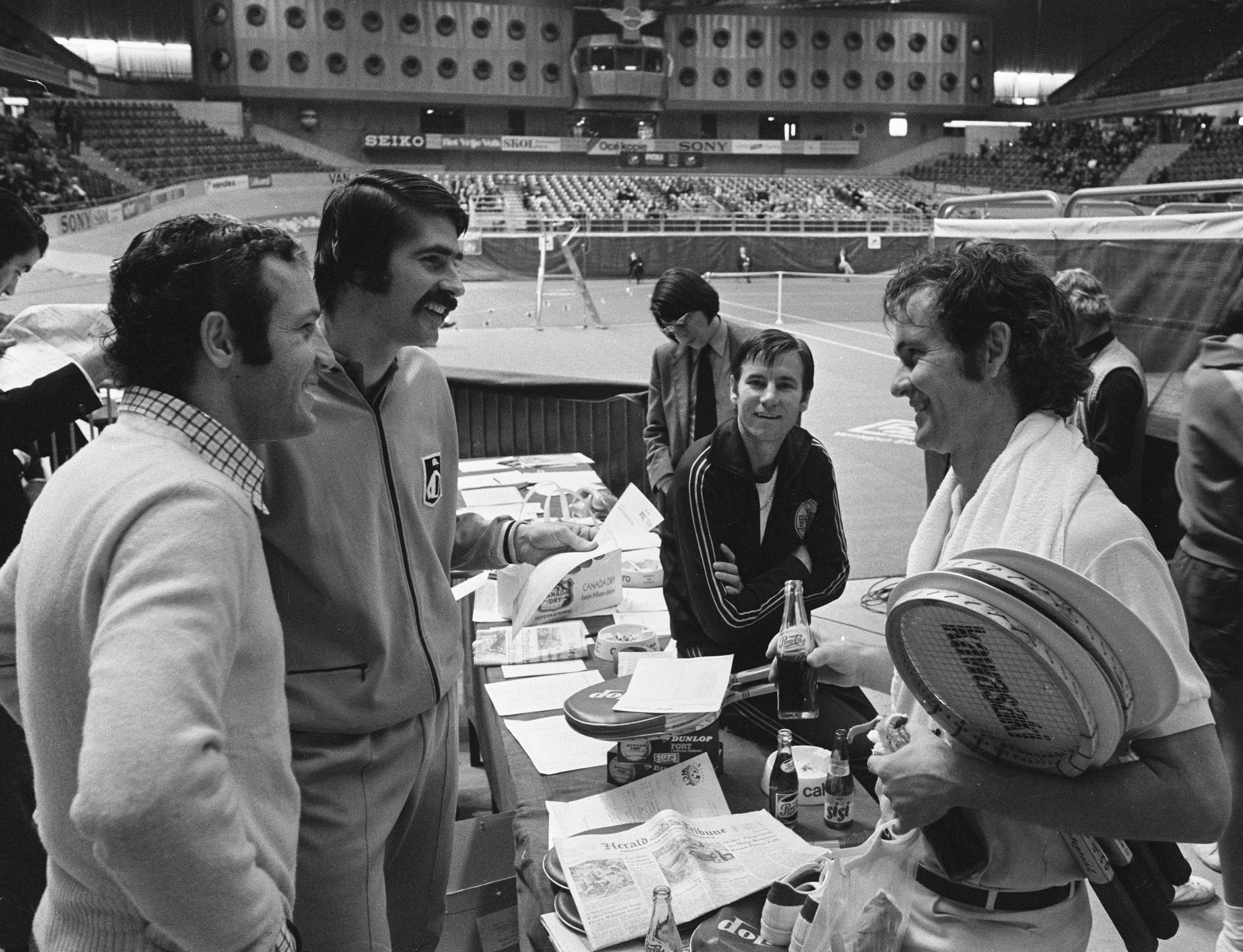
From left to right: Tom Okker, Marty Riessen, Nikola Pilić, Cliff Richey

Semifinals
1	(Australia) John Newcombe	4	6
3	(Netherlands) Tom Okker	6	7
5	(United Kingdom) Mark Cox	3	6	5
2	(United States) Arthur Ashe	6	2	7

Final
3	(Netherlands) Tom Okker	6	2	1
2	(United States) Arthur Ashe	3	6	6

=== Top half ===
First round
1	(Australia) J Newcombe	6	6
(United States) T Leonard	3	2
8	(Socialist Federal Republic of Yugoslavia) N Pilić	4	6
(United States) D Stockton	6	7
(United States) C Pasarell	4	6	6
(United Kingdom) G Battrick	6	1	4
3	(Netherlands) T Okker	6	3	6
(Pakistan) H Rahim	3	6	2
(United Kingdom) R Taylor	6	6
(United States) R Barth	2	4
6	(United States) R Lutz	2	6	7
(South Africa) R Maud	6	2	6

Second round
1	(Australia) J Newcombe	6	6
(Australia) P Dent	3	3
(United States) D Stockton	6	1	4
(United States) C Pasarell	4	6	6
3	(Netherlands) T Okker	6	6
(United Kingdom) R Taylor	0	2
6	(United States) R Lutz	6	6
(United States) F Froehling	0	2

Quarterfinals
1	(Australia) J Newcombe	6	6
(United States) C Pasarell	3	4
3	(Netherlands) T Okker	6	6
6	(United States) R Lutz	3	2

Semifinals
1	(Australia) J Newcombe	4	5
3	(Netherlands) T Okker	6	7

=== Bottom half ===
First round
(Australia) B Carmichael	1	6	6
(Netherlands) J Hordijk	6	4	2
(United Kingdom) G Stilwell	6	6	3
5	(United Kingdom) M Cox	2	7	6
(Australia) R Emerson	3	4
(Australia) A Stone	6	6
(Australia) J Alexander	5	5
4	(United Kingdom) R Drysdale	7	7
(United States) C Richey	6	6
(Australia) T Addison	2	2
(United States) J Borowiak	7	4	6
(Egypt) I El Shafei	5	6	4
(New Zealand) B Fairlie	7	3	3
2	(United States) A Ashe	6	6	6

Second round
(Australia) B Carmichael	6	6
5	(United Kingdom) M Cox	4	2
(Australia) A Stone	2	4
4	(United Kingdom) R Drysdale	6	6
(United States) C Richey	3	2
7	(United States) M Riessen	6	6
(United States) J Borowiak	6	1	3
2	(United States) A Ashe	3	6	6

Quarterfinals
5	(United Kingdom) M Cox	7	7
4	(United Kingdom) R Drysdale	5	6
7	(United States) M Riessen	2	4
2	(United States) A Ashe	6	6

Semifinals
5	(United Kingdom) M Cox	3	6	5
2	(United States) A Ashe	6	2	7
