= 1976 National Tennis Foundation Open =

- Date: January 29– February 1
- Edition: 3rd
- Category: USLTA-IPA Indoor Circuit
- Draw: 18S
- Prize money: $15,000
- Surface: Carpet / indoor
- Location: Cleveland, Ohio, U.S.
- Venue: Public Hall

Champions

Singles
- (Pakistan) Haroon Rahim
← 1973 ·	Grand Prix Cleveland	· 1978 →

The 1976 National Tennis Foundation Open, also known as the Cleveland WCT, was a men's tennis tournament held on indoor carpet courts at Public Hall in Cleveland, Ohio in the United States that was part of the USLTA-IPA Indoor Circuit. It was the third edition of the tournament and was held from January 29 through February 1, 1976. Unseeded Haroon Rahim won the singles title and earned $4,000 first-prize money after defeating first-seeded Alex Metreveli in the final.

== Finals ==
=== Singles ===
(Pakistan) Haroon Rahim defeated (Soviet Union) Alex Metreveli 6–4, 6–4

- It was Rahim's first singles title of his career.
