= 1973 Cleveland Tennis Classic =

- Date: April 9–15
- Edition: 2nd
- Category: World Championship Tennis
- Draw: 32S / 16D
- Prize money: $50,000
- Surface: Carpet / indoor
- Location: Cleveland, Ohio, U.S.

Champions

Singles
- (Australia) Ken Rosewall

Doubles
- (Australia) Ken Rosewall / (Australia) Fred Stolle
← 1972 ·	Grand Prix Cleveland	· 1976 →

The 1973 Cleveland Tennis Classic, also known as the Cleveland WCT, was a men's tennis tournament held on indoor carpet courts in Cleveland, Ohio in the United States that was part of the Group B circuit of the World Championship Tennis. It was the second edition of the tournament and was held between April 9 and April 15, 1973. Fifth-seeded Ken Rosewall won the singles title and earned $10,000 first-prize money as well as 10 WCT ranking points.

== Finals ==
=== Singles ===
(Australia) Ken Rosewall defeated (United Kingdom) Roger Taylor 6–3, 6–4

- It was Rosewall's 2nd singles title of the year and the 30th of his career in the Open Era.

=== Doubles ===
(Australia) Ken Rosewall / (Australia) Fred Stolle defeated (Egypt) Ismail El Shafei / (New Zealand) Brian Fairlie 6–2, 6–3
