= Sugar Bowl International Championships =

Defunct tennis tournament
- Founded: 1934; 91 years ago
- Abolished: 1978; 47 years ago
- Location: New Orleans, Louisiana, United States

The Sugar Bowl International Championships was a men's and women's international tennis tournament founded in 1934. The championships were held New Orleans, Louisiana, United States. The event was part of the Sugar Bowl American football festival.

== History ==
In 1934 the Sugar Bowl Tennis Tournament was established that was won by Wilmer Allison. In 1935 the first Sugar Bowl football tournament was staged this tournament was then added to its "annual festival of sports". The tournament operated in much the same way as the national collegiate level Intercollegiate Championships with separate adult divisions (events) for men's and women's singles, doubles and so on. In 1946 a junior tournament was included in the schedule. The tournament was open to international players and was officially part of the ILTF Circuit until 1979.

Former winners of the men's adult division singles included; Frank Parker, Don McNeil, Bobby Riggs, Pancho Segura, Ted Schroeder, Gardnar Mulloy and Cliff Richey. The tournament is still being staged today as the Allstate Sugar Bowl Tennis Classic which is a USTA National Tournament for juniors only. The adult division ended in 1979. The tournament has been known by various names including the Sugar Bowl Invitation, the Sugar Bowl Tennis Championships, The tournament usually preceded the main football event.

== Event names ==
- Sugar Bowl Tennis Tournament (1934–49)
- Sugar Bowl Tennis Championships (1950–1954)
- Sugar Bowl Invitation (1955–1964)
- Sugar Bowl Tennis Championships (1965–1967)
- Sugar Bowl Tennis Classic (1968–1972)
- Sugar Bowl International Championships 1973–1978)

== See also ==
- Cotton Bowl Classic
- Orange Bowl
