= 1974 Charlotte Tennis Classic =

- Date: April 15–21
- Edition: 4th
- Category: World Championship Tennis
- Draw: 32S / 16D
- Prize money: $50,000
- Surface: Clay / outdoor
- Location: Charlotte, North Carolina, U.S.
- Venue: Olde Providence Racquet Club

Champions

Singles
- (United States) Jeff Borowiak

Doubles
- (United Kingdom) Buster Mottram / (Mexico) Raúl Ramírez
- Carolinas International Tennis Tournament

The 1974 Charlotte Tennis Classic, also known by its sponsored name North Carolina National Bank Tennis Classic, was a men's tennis tournament played on outdoor clay courts that was part of the blue group of the World Championship Tennis (WCT) circuit. It was the fourth edition of the tournament and was held from April 15 through April 21, 1974 at the Julian J. Clark Tennis Stadium on the grounds of the Olde Providence Racquet Club in Charlotte, North Carolina in the United States. Eighth-seeded Jeff Borowiak won the singles title.

== Finals ==
=== Singles ===
(United States) Jeff Borowiak defeated (United States) Dick Stockton 6–4, 5–7, 7–6^{(7–5)}

- It was Borowiak's first singles title of his career.

=== Doubles ===
(United Kingdom) Buster Mottram / (Mexico) Raúl Ramírez defeated (Australia) Owen Davidson / (Australia) John Newcombe 6–3, 1–6, 6–3
