= 1972 Rothmans International Quebec =

- Date: 9–16 April
- Edition: 2nd
- Category: World Championship Tennis (WCT)
- Draw: 32S / 16D
- Prize money: $50,000
- Surface: Carpet / indoor (Sportface)
- Location: Quebec City, Quebec, Canada
- Venue: Laval University
- Attendance: 10,454

Champions

Singles
- (United States) Marty Riessen

Doubles
- (Australia) Bob Carmichael / (Australia) Ray Ruffels
- Quebec WCT

The 1972 Rothmans International Quebec, also known as the Quebec International Open or Quebec WCT, was a men's professional tennis tournament that was part of the 1972 World Championship Tennis circuit. It was held on indoor carpet courts at the Laval University sports centre in Quebec City, Quebec in Canada. It was the second edition of the tournament and was held from 9 April through 16 April 1972. Seventh-seeded Marty Riessen won the singles title and earned $10,000 first-prize money.

== Finals ==
=== Singles ===
(United States) Marty Riessen defeated (Australia) Rod Laver 7–5, 6–2, 7–5

- It was Riessen's only singles title of the year and the 5th of his career in the Open Era.

=== Doubles ===
(Australia) Bob Carmichael / (Australia) Ray Ruffels defeated (Australia) Terry Addison / (Australia) John Alexander 4–6, 6–3 7–5
