= 1972 Charlotte Tennis Classic =

- Date: April 18–23
- Edition: 2nd
- Category: World Championship Tennis
- Draw: 32S / 16D
- Prize money: $50,000
- Surface: Clay / outdoor
- Location: Charlotte, North Carolina, U.S.
- Venue: Olde Providence Racquet Club

Champions

Singles
- (Australia) Ken Rosewall

Doubles
- (Netherlands) Tom Okker / (United States) Marty Riessen
- Carolinas International Tennis Tournament

The 1972 Charlotte Tennis Classic, also known by its sponsored name North Carolina National Bank Tennis Classic, was a men's tennis tournament played on outdoor clay courts that was part of the World Championship Tennis (WCT) circuit. It was the second edition of the tournament and was held from April 18 through April 23, 1972 at the Julian J. Clark Tennis Stadium, owned by the Olde Providence Racquet Club in Charlotte, North Carolina in the United States. Second-seeded Ken Rosewall won the singles title.

== Finals ==
=== Singles ===
(Australia) Ken Rosewall defeated (United States) Cliff Richey 2–6, 6–2, 6–2

=== Doubles ===
(Netherlands) Tom Okker / (United States) Marty Riessen defeated (Australia) John Newcombe / (Australia) Tony Roche 6–4, 4–6, 7–6
