= Rufus Cormier =

American lawyer (born 1948)

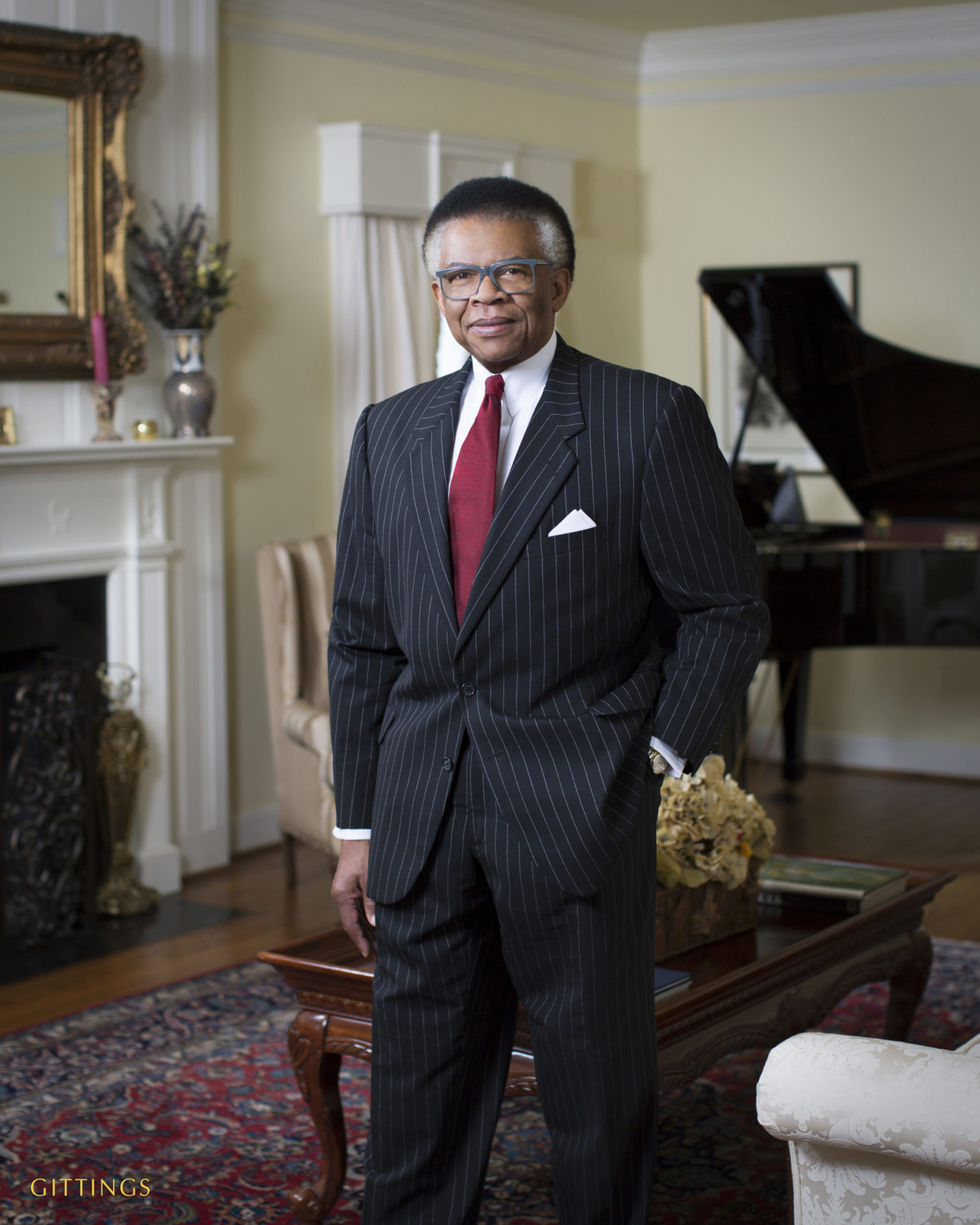
- Born: March 2, 1948 (age 78); Beaumont, Texas, U.S.
- Occupation: Lawyer

Rufus Cormier (born March 2, 1948) is an American lawyer and the first African American partner of Baker Botts LLP firm.

== Early life and education ==
Cormier grew up in the town of Beaumont, Texas. He graduated in 1970 and received his J.D. degree in 1973 from Yale University Law School. He studied here with Clarence Thomas, Robert Reich, and the future first couple, Bill and Hillary Clinton, who refer to the Cormier as long-time friends.

== Football career ==
He moved to Dallas to play varsity football at Southern Methodist University (SMU). He played on the varsity team for Coach Hayden Fry, who joined the University on the condition that he would be able to recruit African American players, integrating the Southwest conference with Jerry LeVias, his school's first Black scholarship football player who joined the team a year before Cormier. In 1968, Cormier was named the Bluebonnet Bowl Most Valuable Player.

== Law Career ==
In 1974, he joined the Baker Botts LLP firm, where, in 1981, he became the first African American partner at this law firm. One of his most recognizable cases was his work as the special assistant for the lead counsel to the House Judiciary Committee for the Nixon impeachment inquiry. As an attorney, he was the first black member of River Oaks Country Club.

== Personal life ==
He married his class fellow, Yvonne. They have three children: Michelle, Geoffrey, and Claire.

== Awards ==
- The Leon Jaworski Award from the Houston Bar Association Auxiliary to honour his lifetime of volunteer service.
- Anti-Defamation League’s Karen H. Susman Jurisprudence Award
- The Silver Anniversary Mustang Award from Southern Methodist University.

== Boards ==
In 1991, Cormier was appointed to the Board of Regents at Texas Southern University, and he served on the board of directors for the Memorial Hermann Healthcare System, the Center For Houston’s Future, and the Gulf Coast Legal Foundation. In addition, he served on the executive board of SMU School of Law.
