= Cotton Bowl Classic (tennis) =

Tournament information
- Founded: 1957
- Location: Texas; Dallas; United States
- Venue: Kiest Tennis Center (KTC)
- Surface: Hard / outdoor

The Cotton Bowl Classic or also the Dallas Cotton Bowl Tennis Classic is a collegiate combined men's and women's outdoor hard court tennis tournament founded in 1957 as the Cotton Bowl Indoor an indoor event. It is currently played annually at the Kiest Tennis Center (KTC), in Dallas, Texas, United States and is open to players aged 18 to 22.

== History ==
The Cotton Bowl Indoor tennis tournament was originally played on indoor courts at the Fair Park Recreation Building, from December 28 to December 31, 1957.

The tournament is sponsored by the Cotton Bowl Council and Dallas Tennis Association, in collaboration with the Dallas Park and Recreation Department.

It is currently played at the Kiest Tennis Center (KTC), Dallas, Texas, United States.

== See also ==
- Orange Bowl
- Sugar Bowl International Championships
