= 1969 Pacific Coast International Open =

- Date: September 29 – October 5
- Edition: 81st
- Draw: 32S / 16D
- Prize money: $20,000
- Surface: Hard / outdoor
- Location: Berkeley, US
- Venue: Berkeley Tennis Club

Champions

Singles
- (United States) Stan Smith (Australia) Margaret Court

Doubles
- (Brazil) Bob Lutz / (United States) Stan Smith (Australia) Margaret Court / (Australia) Lesley Hunt
- Pacific Coast Championships

The 1969 Pacific Coast International Open was a tennis tournament played on outdoor hard courts at the Berkeley Tennis Club in Berkeley, California in the United States. It was the 81st edition of the tournament and ran from September 29 through October 5, 1969. The prize money for the event was $20,000. Stan Smith won the men's singles title. Margaret Court won the women's singles title, and $1,000 prize money.

== Finals ==
=== Men's singles ===
(United States) Stan Smith defeated (United States) Cliff Richey 6–2, 6–3

=== Men's doubles ===
(Brazil) Thomaz Koch / (United States) Stan Smith defeated (Australia) Terry Addison / (Australia) Ray Keldie 6–1, 6–3

=== Women's singles ===
(Australia) Margaret Court defeated (United Kingdom) Winnie Shaw 6–4, 5–7, 6–0

=== Women's doubles ===
(Australia) Margaret Court / (Australia) Lesley Hunt defeated (Australia) Kerry Harris / (United Kingdom) Winnie Shaw 6–3, 6–4
