= Swedish Pro Tennis Championships =

Defunct tennis tournament
- Event name: Gothenburg (1972–73)
- Tour: WCT Circuit (1972–73)
- Founded: 1972
- Abolished: 1973
- Location: Gothenburg, Sweden (1972–73)
- Surface: Carpet (i) (1972–73)

Swedish Pro Tennis Championships was a men's tennis championship only played in 1972 and 1973.

== History ==
The Swedish Pro Tennis Championships were created in Gothenburg, Sweden, as part of the 1972 WCT circuit, as one of the four non-American events of the tour, with the Canada International of Essen, Germany, and the Rotterdam Indoors of Rotterdam, Netherlands. The first tournament in 1972 (which field included a sixteen-year-old Björn Borg), saw the victory of eventual WCT year-end No. 1 John Newcombe, and the second, of 1973's Group A leader Stan Smith. Like many events of the WCT, the Swedish Pro was quickly discontinued as the circuit was searching for new locations to improve its list of tournaments. Gothenburg continued to host Sweden's national championships, as well as Davis Cup ties, and several exhibitions, like the 1976-Rod Laver/Björn Borg challenge match, but the city's international tennis tournament was never revived.

== Past finals ==
=== Singles ===
Year	Champions	Runners-up	Score
1973	(United States) Stan Smith	(Australia) John Alexander	5–7, 6–4, 6–2
1972	(Australia) John Newcombe	(Australia) Roy Emerson	6–0, 6–3, 6–1

=== Doubles ===
Year	Champions	Runners-up	Score
1973	(Australia) Roy Emerson (Australia) Rod Laver	(Socialist Federal Republic of Yugoslavia) Nikola Pilić (Australia) Allan Stone	6–7, 6–4, 6–1
1972	(Netherlands) Tom Okker (United States) Marty Riessen	(Egypt) Ismail El Shafei (New Zealand) Brian Fairlie	6–2, 7–6
