= 1972 First National Tennis Classic =

1972 Louisville WCT
- Date: July 24–30
- Edition: 3rd
- Category: World Championship Tennis (WCT)
- Draw: 32S / 16D
- Prize money: $50,000
- Surface: Clay / outdoor
- Location: Louisville, Kentucky, U.S.
- Venue: Louisville Tennis Center

Champions

Singles
- (United States) Arthur Ashe

Doubles
- (Australia) John Alexander / (United States) Phil Dent
← 1971 ·	Louisville Open	· 1973 →

The 1972 First National Tennis Classic, also known as the Louisville WCT, was a men's tennis tournament played on outdoor clay courts at the Louisville Tennis Center in Louisville, Kentucky, United States. It was the third edition of the tournament and was held from July 24 through July 30, 1972. The tournament was part of the 1972 World Championship Tennis circuit and offered total prize money of $50,000. The singles final was won by ninth-seeded Arthur Ashe who earned $10,000 first-prize money.

== Finals ==
=== Singles ===
(United States) Arthur Ashe defeated (United Kingdom) Mark Cox 6–4, 6–4

=== Doubles ===
(Australia) John Alexander / (United States) Phil Dent defeated (United States) Arthur Ashe / (Australia) Bob Lutz 6–4, 6–3
