= 1973 Swedish Pro Tennis Championships =

- Date: 23–29 April
- Edition: 2nd
- Category: World Championship Tennis
- Draw: 32S / 16D
- Prize money: $50,000
- Surface: Carpet / indoor
- Location: Gothenburg, Sweden
- Venue: Scandinavium

Champions

Singles
- (United States) Stan Smith

Doubles
- (Australia) Roy Emerson / (Australia) Rod Laver
← 1972 ·	Swedish Pro Tennis Championships

The 1973 Swedish Pro Tennis Championships was a men's tennis tournament played on indoor carpet courts. It was the 2nd and final edition of Swedish Pro Tennis Championships, and was part of the 1973 World Championship Tennis circuit. It took place at the Scandinavium in Gothenburg, Sweden, from 23 April through 29 April 1973. First-seeded Stan Smith won the singles title.

== Finals ==
=== Singles ===
(United States) Stan Smith defeated (Australia) John Alexander, 5–7, 6–4, 6–2

- It was Smith's 6th title of the year, and his 22nd overall. It was his 6th WCT title of the year, and his 7th overall.

=== Doubles ===
(Australia) Roy Emerson / (Australia) Rod Laver defeated (Croatia) Nikola Pilić / (Australia) Allan Stone, 6–7, 6–4, 6–1

== See also ==
- 1973 Swedish Open
- 1973 Stockholm Open
