= 1972 Cleveland Classic =

Men's tennis tournament

- Date: August 7–13
- Edition: 1st
- Category: World Championship Tennis
- Draw: 32S / 16D
- Prize money: $50,000
- Surface: Hard / outdoor
- Location: Cleveland, Ohio, United States
- Venue: Public Hall

Champions

Singles
- (United Kingdom) Mark Cox

Doubles
- (South Africa) Cliff Drysdale / (United Kingdom) Roger Taylor
Grand Prix Cleveland	· 1973 →

The 1972 Cleveland Classic, also known as the Cleveland WCT, was a men's tennis tournament played on outdoor hard courts that was part of the World Championship Tennis (WCT) circuit. It was the inaugural edition of the tournament and was held from August 7 through August 13, 1972 at Public Hall in Cleveland, Ohio in the United States. Sixth-seeded Mark Cox won the singles title and earned $10,000 first-prize money after defeating Ray Ruffels in the final.

== Finals ==
=== Singles ===
(United Kingdom) Mark Cox defeated (Australia) Ray Ruffels 6–3, 4–6, 4–6, 6–3, 6–4

=== Doubles ===
(South Africa) Cliff Drysdale / (United Kingdom) Roger Taylor defeated (United States) Frank Froehling / (United States) Charlie Pasarell 7–6, 6–3
