= River Oaks International Tennis Tournament =

River Oaks International
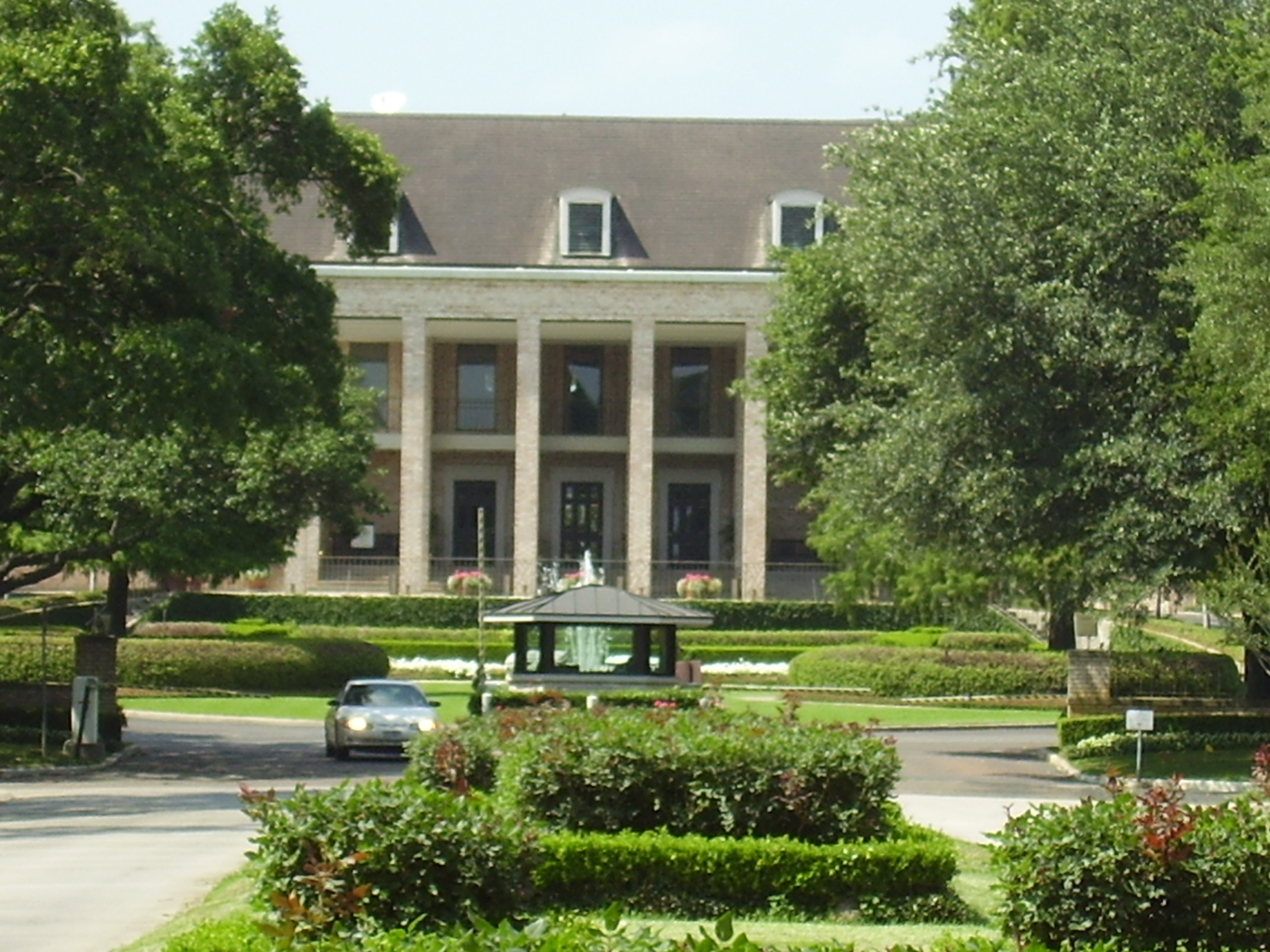

Defunct tennis tournament
- Tour: Grand Prix (1971); WCT (1972–1977); Grand Prix (1978–1981); WCT (1982–1984)
- Founded: 1931
- Abolished: 2007
- Editions: 73
- Location: Houston, Texas, U.S.
- Venue: River Oaks Country Club
- Surface: Clay / outdoor

The River Oaks International Tennis Tournament, also known as the River Oaks Invitational Tennis Tournament, was a men's tennis tournament held in early spring from 1931 until 2007 at the River Oaks Country Club, Houston, Texas, United States. The tournament was the oldest in the country to still be played at its original site, in the original stadium. The tournament was founded by cotton broker Jack Norton. From the very beginning, the River Oaks International was an invitational amateur tournament, and was not associated with the professional tennis associations. From the start, the field was filled with a few stars and then local candidates filled out the rest of the field. The inaugural edition in April 1931, which made a loss of $1,500, was won by 19-year-old Ellsworth Vines. The tournament was not held during the World War II years 1942–1945.

In 1971 the tournament was part of the Grand Prix tennis circuit while from 1973 until 1984 (Note: From 1978 until 1981 the World Championship Tennis tour was part of the Grand Prix circuit.) it formed part of the World Championship Tennis circuit. One of the landmark tournament events was in 1974, the championship match was broadcast before a national audience; thirty-four-year-old Rod Laver, met heir apparent, seventeen-year-old Björn Borg. Laver, who in 1961 became the first foreign player to win the singles title, won in straight sets and became the first man to hold four singles championships at River Oaks.

In 2008, the River Oaks International was merged with one of the oldest, and last remaining clay court tournaments in the United States, the U.S. Men's Clay Court Championships.

== Finals ==
=== Singles ===
Year	Champions	Runners-up	Score
1931	(United States) Ellsworth Vines	(United States) Bruce Barnes	6–3, 6–4, 10–8
1932	(United States) Wilmer Allison	(United States) Jake Hess	8–6, 6–3, 6–2
1933	(United States) Frank Parker	(United States) George Lott	7–5, 10–12, 6–4, 6–2
1934	(United States) Lester Stoefen	(United States) Wilmer Allison	6–2, 6–2, 6–2
1935	(United States) Bryan Grant	(United States) Wilmer Allison	6–3, 1–6, 6–4, 6–4
1936	(United States) Bryan Grant	(United States) Wilmer Allison	6–4, 4–6, 6–4, 6–0
1937	(United States) Bryan Grant	(United States) Wilmer Allison	4–6, 6–3, 6–3, 7–5
1938	(United States) Wayne Sabin	(United States) Ernest Sutter	6–4, 4–6, 4–6, 6–0, 6–2
1939	(United States) Frank Guernsey	(United States) Frank Kovacs	4–6, 7–5, 6–1, 6–3
1940	(United States) Robert Riggs	(United States) Bryan Grant	7–5, 6–3, 7–5
1941	(United States) Frank Kovacs	(United States) Bryan Grant	6–4, 2–6, 7–5, 6–3
1942	No competition (due to WWII)		
1943	No competition (due to WWII)		
1944	No competition (due to WWII)		
1945	No competition (due to WWII)		
1946	(United States) Gardnar Mulloy	(United States) William Talbert	6–4, 4–6, 6–3, 5–7, 6–4
1947	(United States) Jack Kramer	(United States) Gardnar Mulloy	6–1, 6–0, 6–2
1948	(United States) Frank Parker	(United States) William Talbert	9–7, 6–2, 6–1
1949	(United States) Ted Schroeder	(United States) William Talbert	6–4, 4–6, 6–1, 6–4
1950	(United States) Robert Falkenburg	(United States) Ted Schroeder	6–0, 15–13, 3–6, 6–4
1951	(United States) Arthur Larsen	(United States) Herbert Flam	6–4, 7–5, 3–6, 10–8
1952	(United States) Gardnar Mulloy	(United States) Arthur Larsen	6–3, 3–6, 3–6, 8–6, 6–4
1953	(United States) Gardnar Mulloy	(United States) Vic Seixas	6–4, 5–7, 6–4, 6–2
1954	(United States) Dick Savitt	(United States) Ham Richardson	4–6, 6–3, 6–4, 7–5
1955	(United States) Tony Trabert	(United States) Vic Seixas	6–0, 6–1, 6–4
1956	(United States) Ham Richardson	(United States) Vic Seixas	7–5, 6–0, 3–6, 6–4
1957	(United States) Herbert Flam	(Australia) Mervyn Rose	7–5, 6–1, 6–4
1958	(United States) Barry MacKay	(Chile) Luis Ayala	8–10, 6–4, 6–3, 6–3
1959	(United States) Bernard Bartzen	(United States) Dick Savitt	2–6, 7–5, 4–6, 0–2 retired
1960	(United States) Barry MacKay	(Australia) Neale Fraser	7–5, 6–3, 6–4
1961	(Australia) Rod Laver	(Australia) Roy Emerson	7–5, 7–5, 1–6, 6–3
1962	(Australia) Rod Laver	(Australia) Roy Emerson	6–1, 7–5, 7–5
1963	(Spain) Manuel Santana	(United States) Chuck McKinley	6–4, 13-11, 3–6, 2–6, 6–4
1964	(Australia) Roy Emerson	(Socialist Federal Republic of Yugoslavia) Nikola Pilić	6–1, 6–4, 6–2
1965	(India) Ramanathan Krishnan	(United States) Cliff Richey	6–4, 2–6, 6–4, 6–3
1966	(Australia) Marty Mulligan	(Socialist Federal Republic of Yugoslavia) Nikola Pilić	6–2, 3–6, 6–4, 0–6, 4–5
1967	(Australia) John Newcombe	(Australia) Tony Roche	6–2, 7–5, 6–3
1968	(United States) Cliff Richey	(Socialist Federal Republic of Yugoslavia) Boro Jovanović	6–4, 6–1, 6–0
1969	(Socialist Federal Republic of Yugoslavia) Željko Franulović	(Mexico) Rafael Osuna	7–5, 6–3, 6–2
1970	(United States) Clark Graebner	(United States) Cliff Richey	2–6, 6–3, 5–7, 6–3, 6–2
1971	(United States) Cliff Richey	(United States) Clark Graebner	6–1, 6–2, 6–2
1972	(Australia) Rod Laver	(Australia) Ken Rosewall	6–2, 6–4
1973	(Australia) Ken Rosewall	(Australia) Fred Stolle	6–4, 6–1, 7–5
1974	(Australia) Rod Laver	(Sweden) Björn Borg	7–6, 6–2
1975	(Australia) Ken Rosewall	(South Africa) Cliff Drysdale	6–4, 6–7, 6–4
1976	(United States) Harold Solomon	(Australia) Ken Rosewall	6–4, 1–6, 6–1
1977	(Italy) Adriano Panatta	(United States) Vitas Gerulaitis	7–6, 6–7, 6–1
1978	(United States) Brian Gottfried	(Romania) Ilie Năstase	3–6, 6–2, 6–1
1979	(Spain) José Higueras	(United States) Gene Mayer	6–3, 2–6, 7–6
1980	(Czechoslovakia) Ivan Lendl	(United States) Eddie Dibbs	6–1, 6–3
1981	(Argentina) Guillermo Vilas	(United States) Sammy Giammalva Jr.	6–2, 6–4
1982	(Czechoslovakia) Ivan Lendl	(Argentina) José Luis Clerc	3–6, 7–6, 6–0, 1–4 retired
1983	(Czechoslovakia) Ivan Lendl	(Australia) Paul McNamee	6–2, 6–0, 6–3
1984	(United States) Mark Dickson	(United States) Sammy Giammalva Jr.	6–3, 6–2
1985	(Australia) Paul McNamee	(Sweden) Anders Järryd	7–6, 4–6, 6–4
1986	(United States) Jimmy Arias	(Sweden) Mats Wilander	6–2, 2–6, 6–1
1987	(United States) Jimmy Arias	(Sweden) Jonas Svensson	6–2, 6–4
1988	(France) Henri Leconte	(United States) Michael Chang	4–6, 7–6, 6–3
1989	(Sweden) Magnus Gustafsson	(Socialist Federal Republic of Yugoslavia) Bruno Orešar	6–2, 6–0
1990	(United States) Richey Reneberg	(Sweden) Magnus Gustafsson	6–4, 6–4
1991	(Sweden) Magnus Gustafsson	(Sweden) Magnus Larsson	6–7, 7–6, 6–1
1992	(United States) Bryan Shelton	(United States) Jeff Tarango	4–6, 6–3, 6–2
1993	(United States) Richey Reneberg	(United States) Todd Martin	5–7, 6–3, 6–3
1994	(Sweden) Magnus Larsson	(United States) Richey Reneberg	6–4, 6–2
1995	(Sweden) Mikael Tillström	(Australia) Richard Fromberg	6–3, 6–4
1996	(Norway) Christian Ruud	(United States) Jeff Tarango	3–6, 6–3, 7–5
1997	(Australia) Jason Stoltenberg	(United States) Alex O'Brien	6–2, 4–6, 7–5
1998	(Argentina) Mariano Zabaleta	(Belgium) Xavier Malisse	7–6, 6–2
1999	(United States) Vince Spadea	(Australia) Jason Stoltenberg	6–4, 6–2
2000	(Sweden) Magnus Larsson	(Switzerland) Roger Federer	3–6, 6–1, 7–5
2001	(Romania) Andrei Pavel	(Norway) Christian Ruud	6–3, 6–4
2002	(Switzerland) Michel Kratochvil	(South Africa) Wayne Ferreira	6–4, 4–6, 7–6
2003	(United States) James Blake	(South Africa) Wayne Ferreira	6–2, 4–6, 6–3
2004	(Czech Republic) Jiří Novák & (United States) Hugo Armando		Title shared
2005	(United States) James Blake	(Russia) Dmitri Tursunov	6–2, 6–3
2006	(Romania) Victor Hănescu	(Argentina) Juan Mónaco	6–7, 6–4, 7–5
2007	(Russia) Dmitri Tursunov	(Chile) Nicolás Massú	2–6, 1–0 retired
2008	see U.S. Men's Clay Court Championships		

== See also ==
- U.S. Men's Clay Court Championships
