= River Oaks Country Club =

Prestigious country club in Houston Texas

Coordinates: 29.753°N 95.426°W

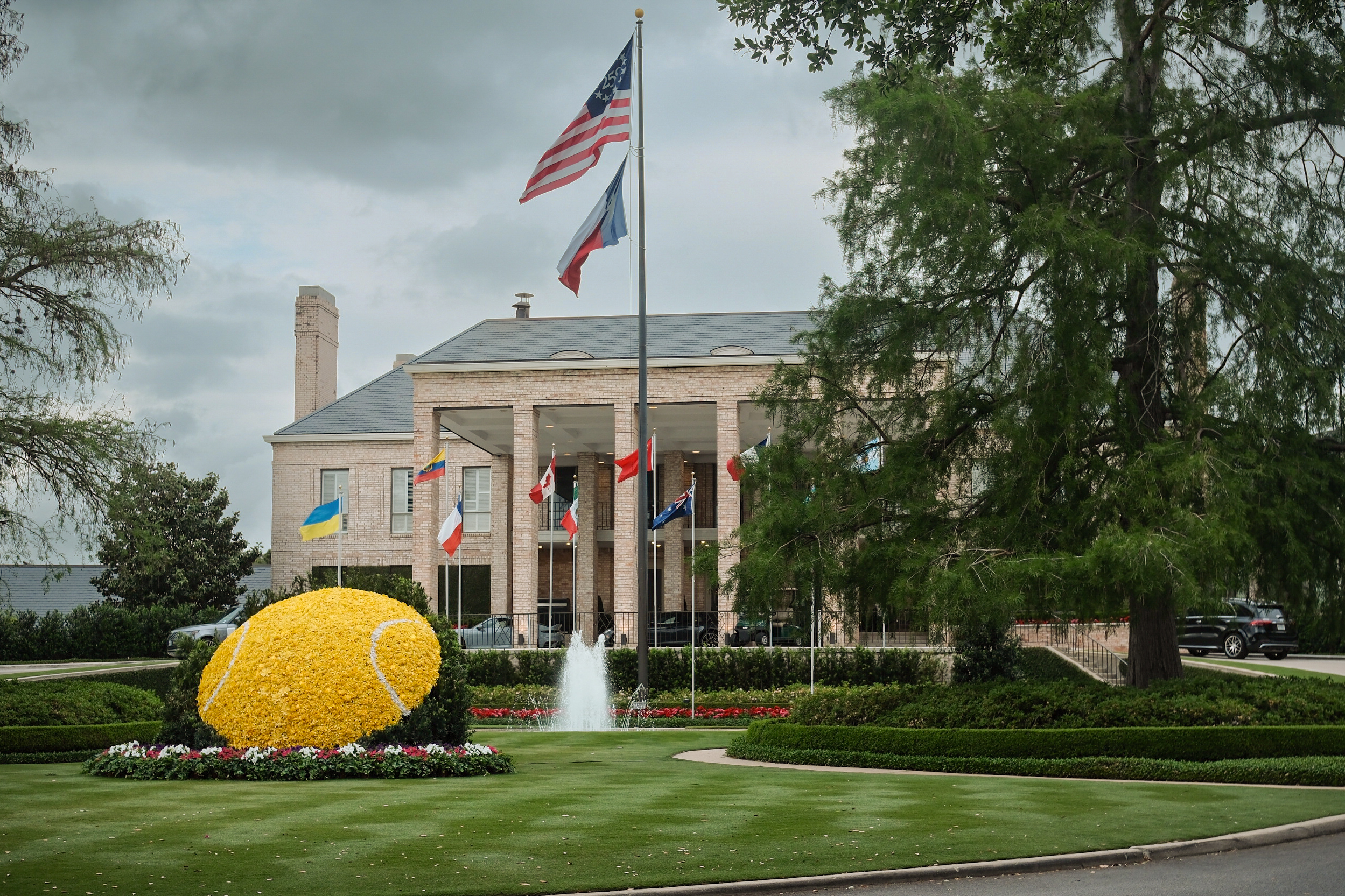
The River Oaks Country Club

River Oaks Country Club is a country club in the River Oaks neighborhood in Houston, Texas. The club has hosted the River Oaks International Tennis Tournament since 1931. It is located at 1600 River Oaks Boulevard, Houston TX 77019.

== History ==
Location in the United States

River Oaks Country Club was founded in 1923 in the River Oaks neighborhood in Houston. Architect John F. Staub was hired to design the original two-story Spanish revival clubhouse. The club house was built south of the golf course that was designed by Donald Ross. The current clubhouse was built in the 1960s on the same site as the original.

Location in Texas

River Oaks' golf course was the venue for the PGA Tour's Western Open in 1940, and the Houston Open in 1937, 1938, and 1946.

River Oaks has been home to the River Oaks International Tennis Tournament from 1931 until it was merged with the oldest clay court tournaments in the United States, the U.S Men's Clay Court Championships. On May 8, 2007, the United States Tennis Association awarded River Oaks the U.S. Men's Clay Court Championships starting in 2008, taking over the event from Westside Tennis Club. Other cities that competed for the event were Atlanta, Winston-Salem, North Carolina, and Ponte Vedra Beach, Florida. The tournament purse is $415,000 with a winner's share of $65,850.

The new venue for the clay court championships was to feature American red clay courts that were installed in 2005, with a stadium capacity of 3,000. Temporary seating for 500 was to be installed for the second court.

Around 1993, River Oaks and some other area country clubs began claiming a new tax break. That same year, an article in the Houston Post alleged that even though River Oaks and two other area country clubs had bylaws stating that membership was open to people of all races, they covertly discriminated against black people. Admitting only white members for 73 years, River Oaks admitted its first black member, Baker Botts attorney Rufus Cormier, in 1997.

As of 2018, River Oaks had a waiting list of applicants for membership.

== See also ==
- 2012 U.S. Men's Clay Court Championships
- Houston Country Club
- Royal Oaks Country Club
- List of tennis stadiums by capacity
