= Carolinas International Tennis Tournament =

Defunct tennis tournament
- Tour: ILTF (1965–69) men (1965–72) women Independent (1970); ILTF Grand Prix Circuit (1971); WCT tour (1972–1977)
- Founded: 1965
- Abolished: 1977
- Editions: 8
- Location: Charlotte, North Carolina, U.S.
- Venue: Olde Providence Racquet Club
- Surface: Hard / outdoor (1971); Clay / outdoor (1970, 1972–1977)

The Carolinas International Tennis Tournament, also known by its sponsored name North Carolina National Bank Tennis Classic, was a combined men's and women's tennis tournament founded in 1965. Also known as the Carolinas Invitational it was played at the Julian J. Clark Tennis Stadium on the grounds of the Olde Providence Racquet Club in Charlotte, North Carolina from 1965 through 1977. The inaugural edition was part of the Grand Prix tennis circuit while the following editions were part of the World Championship Tennis (WCT) circuit. The event was held on outdoor hard courts in 1971, and on outdoor clay courts in 1970 and from 1972 through 1977.

== Finals ==
=== Men's singles (spring) ===
Year	Champions	Runners-up	Score
1969	(United Kingdom) Mark Cox	(Czechoslovakia) Jan Kodeš	13–11, 6–2
1970	(United States) Cliff Richey	(Australia) Bob Carmichael	6–4, 6–4.
1971	(United States) Arthur Ashe	(United States) Stan Smith	6–3, 6–3
1972	(Australia) Ken Rosewall	(United States) Cliff Richey	2–6, 6–2, 6–2
1973	(Australia) Ken Rosewall	(United States) Arthur Ashe	6–3, 7–6
1974	(United States) Jeff Borowiak	(United States) Dick Stockton	6–4, 5–7, 7–6
1975	(Mexico) Raúl Ramírez	(United States) Roscoe Tanner	3–6, 6–4, 6–3
1976	(Australia) Tony Roche	(United States) Vitas Gerulaitis	6–3, 3–6, 6–1
1977	(Italy) Corrado Barazzutti	(United States) Eddie Dibbs	7–6, 6–0

=== Men's singles (autumn) ===
(incomplete roll)

Year	Champions	Runners-up	Score
1970	(United States) Cliff Richey	(United States) Erik van Dillen	6–3, 7–6.
1975	(India) Vijay Amritraj	(United States) Ilie Năstase	3–6, 7–5, 6–4.

=== Men's doubles ===
Year	Champions	Runners-up	Score
1971	(United States) Marty Riessen (Australia) Tony Roche	(United States) Arthur Ashe (United States) Dennis Ralston	Not available
1972	(Netherlands) Tom Okker (United States) Marty Riessen	(Australia) John Newcombe (Australia) Tony Roche	6–4, 4–6, 7–6
1973	(Netherlands) Tom Okker (United States) Marty Riessen	(United States) Tom Gorman (United States) Erik van Dillen	7–6, 3–6, 6–3
1974	(United Kingdom) Buster Mottram (Mexico) Raúl Ramírez	(Australia) Owen Davidson (Australia) John Newcombe	6–3, 1–6, 6–3
1975	(Chile) Patricio Cornejo (Chile) Jaime Fillol	(Egypt) Ismail El Shafei (New Zealand) Brian Fairlie	6–3, 5–7, 6–4
1976	(Australia) John Newcombe (Australia) Tony Roche	(United States) Vitas Gerulaitis (United States) Gene Mayer	6–3, 7–5
1977	(Netherlands) Tom Okker (Australia) Ken Rosewall	(Italy) Corrado Barazzutti (Italy) Adriano Panatta	6–1, 3–6, 7–6

=== Women's singles (spring) ===
(incomplete roll)

Year	Champions	Runners-up	Score
1969	(Australia) Margaret Court	(United States) Judy Tegart	6–1, 6–1
1970	(United States) Nancy Richey	(Czechoslovakia) Alena Palmeova	6–0, 6–0

=== Women's singles (autumn) ===
(incomplete roll)

Year	Champions	Runners-up	Score
1970	(United States) Nancy Richey	(United States) Chris Evert	6–4, 6–1
