= Cliff Richey =

American tennis player

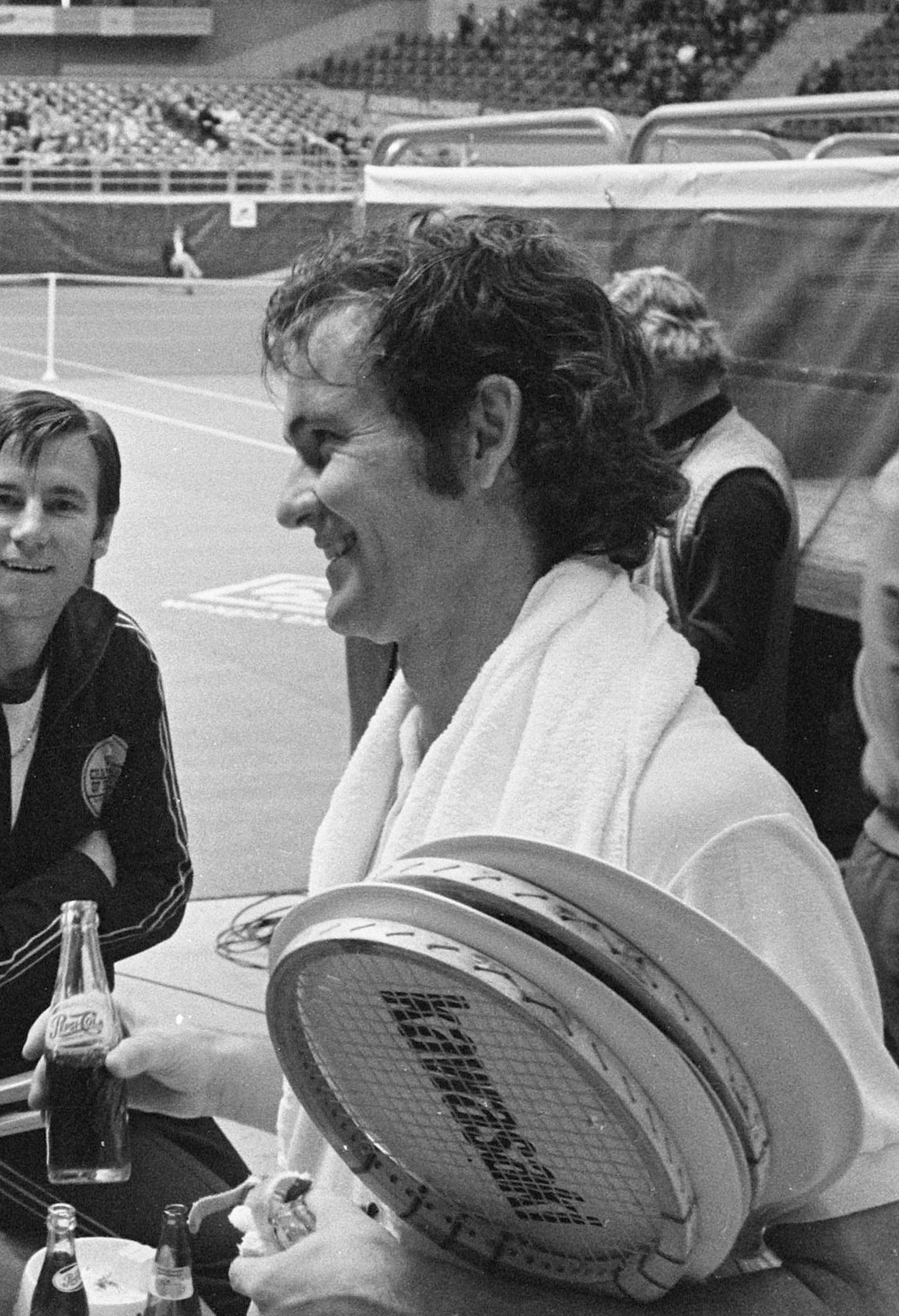
- Richey in 1972
- Full name: George Clifford Richey Jr.
- Country (sports): United States
- Residence: San Angelo, Texas, US
- Born: December 31, 1946 (age 79) San Angelo, Texas, US
- Height: 1.75 m (5 ft 9 in)
- Turned pro: 1962 (amateur)
- Retired: 1979
- Plays: Right-handed (one-handed backhand)

Singles
- Career record: 761–322
- Career titles: 45
- Highest ranking: No. 6 (1970, Martini-Rossi panel)

Grand Slam singles results
- Australian Open: QF (1967)
- French Open: SF (1970)
- Wimbledon: QF (1971)
- US Open: SF (1970, 1972)

Other tournaments
- Tour Finals: RR (1971)

Doubles
- Career record: 62–100
- Career titles: 1

Grand Slam doubles results
- Australian Open: QF (1967)
- French Open: QF (1971)
- Wimbledon: 2R (1967, 1968, 1969)
- US Open: 2R (1971)

Grand Slam mixed doubles results
- French Open: QF (1969)
- Wimbledon: 2R (1964, 1966, 1967)
- US Open: QF (1970)

Team competitions
- Davis Cup: W (1969, 1970)

George Clifford Richey Jr. (born December 31, 1946) is an American former amateur and professional tennis player who was active during the 1960s and 1970s. Richey achieved a highest singles ranking of World No. 6 and reached at least the quarterfinal stage of the singles event at all four Grand Slam tournaments.

== Career ==
Richey was the American junior national tennis champion in 1962 (16 years) and 1963 (18 years) and in 1964 he won the boys' singles title at the French Championships. He won his first senior singles in October 1962 at the Permian Basin Invitation in Midland, Texas against Butch Newman.

Richey was a member of the American team which won the 1969 Davis Cup against Romania but did not actively participate. He was an active member of the team that won the 1970 Davis Cup, winning both his singles matches in the final against West Germany, and was voted the most valuable player. In September 1971, Richey quit the Davis Cup team before the final against Romania citing his disagreement with the USLTA over the choice of surface and the lack of consultation with players. In total, Richey played in seven Davis Cup ties between 1966 and 1970 and compiled a record of ten wins and three losses.

Richey was the winner of the first Grand Prix tennis circuit, organized in 1970, finishing ahead of Arthur Ashe and Ken Rosewall. His career-high singles ranking was World No. 6, achieved in 1970, and No. 1 in the U.S for that same year. The No. 1 ranking was decided by the outcome of the semifinal match at the Pacific Coast Championships against his direct competitor, Stan Smith, and ultimately came down to just a single point when both players had a match-point at 4–4 in the sudden death tiebreak of the final set.

Richey reached the semifinal of a Grand Slam tournament on three occasions. His first semifinal appearance was at the 1970 French Open where he lost to Yugoslav Željko Franulović in a five-set match after leading two-sets-to-one and 5–1 in the fourth set and having failed to convert two match points. At the 1970 US Open later that year Richey again reached the semifinal which he lost in straight sets to Australian Tony Roche. His last Grand Slam semifinal appearance came two years later at the 1972 US Open where he defeated Rod Laver in the fourth round but was beaten in the semis in straight sets by compatriot Arthur Ashe. His best singles result at the Wimbledon Championships was reaching the quarterfinal in 1971 in which he lost to Ken Rosewall in a close four-hour five-set match.

During the first years of the Open Era, which started in 1968, Richey chose to be an independent professional but in April 1972 he became a contract professional when he signed a four-year contract with Lamar Hunt to join the World Championship Tennis tour.

He is the brother of Nancy Richey, a Hall of Fame tennis player who won two Grand Slam singles tournaments. They were the first brother-sister combination to both be concurrently ranked in the US Top Ten. They were ranked in the Top Three concurrently in 1965, 1967, 1969 and 1970. He won his final singles title at the Johannesburg Open in 1978 against Colin Dowdeswell.

== Career finals ==
=== Singles: 72 (45 titles, 27 runners-up) ===
Category + (Titles)
ILTF (27)
ILTF Grand Prix/ILTF Independent/WCT Circuit (18)

Titles by surface
Clay – outdoor (24)
Grass – outdoor (3)
Hard – outdoor (10)
Carpet – indoor (3)
Hard – indoor (3)

Result	No.	Date	Tournament	Location	Surface	Opponent	Score
Win	1.	1962	Permian Basin Invitation	Midland	Clay	(United States) Butch Newman	6–3, 8–10, 8–6
Win	2.	1962	San Angelo Open	San Angelo	Hard	(United States) David Kent	6–2, 6–1
Win	3.	1963	Texas State Championships	Dallas	Hard	(United States) Bill Lust	6–2, 6–2, 6–4
Loss	1.	1963	Sugar Bowl Invitation	New Orleans	Clay	(United States) Ham Richardson	8–6, 5–7, 6–3, 4–6, 1–6
Win	4.	1964	Pittsburgh Golf Club Invitation Indoors	Pittsburgh	Hard (i)	(United States) Butch Newman	6–3, 4–6, 7–5
Win	5.	1964	Sugar Bowl Invitation	New Orleans	Clay	(United States) Ham Richardson	6–0, 6–2, 9–11, 4–6, 8–6
Loss	2.	1965	Pittsburgh Golf Club Invitation Indoors	Pittsburgh	Grass	(United States) Ron Holmberg	6–4, 5–7, 1–6
Win	6.	1965	Dallas Invitational	Dallas	Clay	(United States) Ham Richardson	4–6, 6–4, 6–2
Loss	3.	1965	River Oaks Championships	Houston	Grass	(India) Ramanathan Krishnan	4–6, 6–2, 4–6, 3–6
Win	7.	1965	Western States Championships	Milwaukee	Clay	(United States) Marty Riessen	5–7, 6–4, 6–3, 6–3
Loss	4.	1965	U.S. Clay Court Championships	Houston	Clay	(United States) Dennis Ralston	4–6, 6–4, 4–6, 3–6
Win	8.	1966	South American Championships	Buenos Aires	Clay	(Brazil) Thomaz Koch	6–3, 6–2, 2–6, 6–0
Loss	5.	1966	St. Petersburg Masters Invitational	St. Petersburg	Clay	(Socialist Federal Republic of Yugoslavia) Niki Pilic	7–9, 5–7, 6–8
Loss	6.	1966	Caribe Hilton International	San Juan	Hard	(United States) Arthur Ashe	6–3, 4–6, 3–6
Loss	7.	1966	Western Australian Championships	Perth	Grass	(United States) Arthur Ashe	6–3, 2–6, 3–6, 4–6
Win	9.	1966	West of England Championships	Bristol	Grass	(Canada) Mike Belkin	6–1, 6–3
Win	10.	1966	Western States Championships	Indianapolis	Clay	(United States) Dennis Ralston	6–1, 1–6, 6–1, 6–2
Loss	8.	1966	Newport Casino Invitational	Newport	Grass	(United States) Dennis Ralston	12–14, 9–11, 6–8
Win	11.	1966	U.S. Clay Court Championships	Houston	Clay	(United States) Frank Froehling	13–11, 6–1, 6–3
Win	12.	1967	Peru International Championships	Lima	Clay	(Chile) Patricio Cornejo (2nd)	Round Robin
Win	13.	1967	Porto Alegre International	Porto Alegre	Clay	(Netherlands) Tom Okker	4–6, 6–3, 3–6, 6–8
Win	14.	1967	Tulsa Invitation	Tulsa	?	(United States) Clark Graebner	6–2, 6–1
Win	15.	1967	South American Championships	Buenos Aires	Clay	(Brazil) José Mandarino	7–5, 6–8, 6–3, 6–3
Loss	9.	1967	Atlanta Invitation	Atlanta	Hard	(United States) Marty Riessen	5–7, 2–6, 4–6
Win	16.	1967	River Plate International Championships	Buenos Aires	Clay	(United States) Clark Graebner	3–6, 6–4, 7–5
Loss	10.	1967	Pacific Coast Championships	Berkeley	Hard	(United States) Charles Pasarell	5–7, 6–8
Win	17.	1967	Permian Basin Invitation	Midland	Clay	(United States) Jim Parker	6–4, 6–4
Loss	11.	1968	Altamira International Invitation	Caracas	Hard	(United States) Marty Riessen	1–6, 6–8, 1–6
Win	18.	1968	River Oaks Championships	Houston	Grass	(Socialist Federal Republic of Yugoslavia) Boro Jovanović	6–4, 6–1, 6–0
Win	19.	1968	U.S. National Indoor Championships	Houston	Hard (i)	(United States) Clark Graebner	6–4, 6–4, 6–4
Loss	12.	1968	Western States Championships	Indianapolis	?	(Chile) Jaime Fillol	1-6, 5–7, 2–6
Win	20.	1968	Sugar Bowl Tennis Classic	New Orleans	Clay	(United States) Ron Holmberg	6–4, 6–4, 4–6, 8–6
↓ Open era ↓
Win	21.	1969	Omaha International	Omaha	Clay	(Mexico) Joaquín Loyo-Mayo	6–4, 6–2
Win	22.	1969	Curaçao International Championships	Willemstad	Hard	(United Kingdom) Mark Cox	6–4, 6–2
Win	23.	1969	Thunderbird Invitational	Phoenix	Hard	(Spain) Manuel Santana	6–4, 6–4
Win	24.	1969	Pennsylvania Grass Court Championships	Haverford	Grass	(Australia) Bob Carmichael	6–4, 7–9, 6–2, 6–4
Loss	13.	1969	Pacific Southwest Championships	Los Angeles	Hard	(United States) Pancho Gonzales	0–6, 5–7
Win	25.	1969	Western Championships	Cincinnati	Clay	(Australia) Allan Stone	6–1, 6–2
Win	26.	1969	Sugar Bowl Tennis Classic	New Orleans	Clay	(United States) Jim Osborne	6–4, 6–4, 6–2
Loss	14.	1969	Pacific Coast International Open	Berkeley	Hard	(United States) Stan Smith	2–6, 3–6
Win	27.	1969	Canadian Open	Toronto	Clay	(United States) Butch Buchholz	6–4, 5–7, 6–4, 6–0
Win	28.	1970	Carolinas International Classic	Charlotte	Hard	(United States) Erik van Dillen	6–3, 7–6
Win	29.	1970	Washington Star International	Washington, D.C.	Clay	(United States) Arthur Ashe	7–5, 6–2, 6–1
Win	30.	1970	Charlotte Invitation	Charlotte	Clay	(Australia) Bob Carmichael	6–4, 6–4
Loss	15.	1970	Caribe Hilton International Championships	San Juan	Hard	(United States) Arthur Ashe	4–6, 3–6, 6–1, 3–6,
Win	31.	1970	Austin Smith Championships	Fort Lauderdale	Clay	(United States) Clark Graebner	6–3, 7–5
Win	32.	1970	Macon Indoor	Macon	Carpet (i)	(United States) Arthur Ashe	3–6, 6–3, 8–6
Loss	15.	1970	British Covered Court Championships	London	Carpet (i)	(Australia) Rod Laver	3–6, 4–6, 5–7
Loss	16.	1970	River Oaks International	Houston	Clay	(United States) Clark Graebner	6–2, 3–6, 7–5, 3–6, 2–6
Win	33.	1970	Atlanta Invitational	Atlanta	?	(United States) Frank Froehling	6–2, 6–2
Loss	17.	1970	U.S. International Indoor Championships	Salisbury	Hard (i)	(Romania) Ilie Năstase	6–8, 3–6, 6–4, 9–7, 6–0
Win	34.	1970	U.S. Clay Court Championships	Indianapolis	Clay	(United States) Stan Smith	6–2, 10–8, 3–6, 6–1
Loss	18.	1970	Western Championships	Cincinnati	Clay	(Australia) Ken Rosewall	9–7, 7–9, 6–8
Loss	19.	1970	Pacific Coast International Open	Berkeley	Hard	(United States) } Arthur Ashe	4–6, 2–6, 4–6
Win	35.	1971	Des Moines International Indoors	Des Moines	Carpet (i)	(Czechoslovakia) Vladimír Zedník	6–1, 6–3
Loss	19.	1971	Midlands International	Omaha	Carpet (i)	(Romania) Ilie Năstase	4–6, 3–6, 1–6
Win	36.	1971	Fort Lauderdale Open	Fort Lauderdale	Clay	(South Africa) Pat Cramer	6–7, 6–7, 6–3, 6–4, 6–2
Win	37.	1971	Glenwood Manor Invitation	Overland Park	?	(Peru) Alex Olmedo	7–5, 5–7, 6–2
Loss	20.	1971	Caribe Hilton International Championships	San Juan	Hard	(United States) Stan Smith	3–6, 3–6
Win	38.	1971	River Oaks International	Houston	Clay	(United States) Clark Graebner	6–1, 6–2, 6–2
Loss	21.	1971	U.S. International Indoor Championships	Salisbury	Hard (i)	(United States) Clark Graebner	6–2, 6–7, 6–1, 6–7, 0–6
Loss	22.	1971	U.S. Clay Court Championships	Houston	Clay	(Socialist Federal Republic of Yugoslavia) Željko Franulović	3–6, 4–6, 6–0, 3–6
Win	39.	1972	Bretton Woods WCT	Bretton Woods	Clay	(United States) Jeff Borowiak	6–1, 6–0
Win	40.	1972	Rothmans International Tennis Tournament	London	Carpet (i)	(United States) Clark Graebner	6–1, 6–0
Loss	23.	1972	Carolinas International Tennis Tournament	Charlotte	Clay	(Australia) Ken Rosewall	6–2, 2–6, 2–6
Win	41.	1972	South African Open	London	Hard	(Spain) Manuel Orantes	6–4, 7–5, 3–6, 6–4
Loss	24.	1973	WCT Munich	Charlotte	Carpet (i)	(United States) Stan Smith	1–6, 5–7
Win	42.	1974	Lakeway WCT	Lakeway	Hard	(Australia) John Alexander	7–6, 6–1
Loss	25.	1974	Australian Indoor Championships	Charlotte	Hard (i)	(Australia) John Newcombe	4–6, 3–6, 4–6
Loss	26.	1976	Boca Raton IPA Classic	Boca Raton	Clay	(Australia) Butch Walts	6–4, 4–6, 4–6
Win	43.	1976	Bermuda Tennis Classic	Hamilton	Hard	(United States) Gene Mayer	7–6, 6–2
Loss	27.	1976	Sun Devil Open	Tempe	Hard (i)	(Australia) Dick Stockton	1–6, 4–6
Win	44.	1977	Bahamas International Open	Freeport	Hard	(United States) John McEnroe	7–5, 4–6, 6–2
Win	45.	1978	Johannesburg Open	Johannesburg	Hard	(United Kingdom) Colin Dowdeswell	6–2, 6–4

== Personal life ==
Golf highlights:

- Founding member, Celebrity Players' Tour (1997)
- Played celebrity golf tour for 15 years (1992–2007)
- Won tour events in Jamaica (2004) and Baltimore (2006)
- Scratch golfer (74.5 career stroke average; career best round 63)

Mental health awareness fundraising and activism:

- Richey organized tennis and golf tournaments to benefit charities:
- Angelo Catholic School (1986, 1987, 1988, 1989, 1990)
- James Phillips Williams Memorial [Dyslexia] Foundation (1991, 1992, 1993)
- Mental Health/Mental Retardation (MHMR) (1999)
- United Way (2005, 2006, 2007, 2009)
- Nominated for Frank M. Adams Award for Outstanding Volunteer Service (2000)

Public lectures and presentations:

- Keynote presentation, Texas state convention for executive directors of MHMR (2000)
- Community legislative forums (1999, 2000)
- Invited lectures to college campuses and psychology classes (2006, 2007, 2008)
- Keynote address, MHMR banquet (Palestine, TX, 2000)
- 2010 Mental Health America/TX Boots, Bells, and Hearts award
- 2010 Texas Council of MHMR's Annual Conference, Keynote Speaker, Woodlands TX
- 2010 National Alliance on Mental Illness (NAMI) National Convention, breakfast presentation
- Fourteen-city book tour for Acing Depression: A Tennis Champion's Toughest Match, 2010
- 2010 Lecture at the Grand Rounds, New York State Psychiatric Institute, Columbia University to Faculty and trainees
- 2010 Keynote speaker Montana State Convention on Mental Illness, Billings, Montana

== Works ==
- Richey, Cliff; Kallendorf, Hilaire Richey; Connors, Jimmy (April 1, 2010). Acing Depression: A Tennis Champion's Toughest Match. New Chapter Press. ISBN 978-0-942257-66-3.
