= 1972 Pacific Southwest Open – Doubles =

Doubles
- 1972 Pacific Southwest Open

Final
- Champion: (United States) Jimmy Connors (United States) Pancho Gonzales
- Runner-up: (Egypt) Ismail El Shafei (New Zealand) Brian Fairlie
- Score: 6–3, 7–6

Details
- Draw: 45
- Seeds: 4

Events
Singles	Doubles
← 1971 ·	Los Angeles Open	· 1973 →

The 1972 Pacific Southwest Open – Men's doubles was an event of the 1972 Pacific Southwest Open tennis tournament and was played on outdoor hard courts at the Los Angeles Tennis Center in Los Angeles, California, in the United States, between September 18 and September 24, 1970. John Alexander and Phil Dent were the defending Pacific Southwest Open doubles champions but were defeated in the quarterfinals. Unseeded Jimmy Connors and Pancho Gonzales won the title by defeating unseeded Ismail El Shafei and Brian Fairlie in the final, 6–3, 7–6.

== Seeds ==
1. (South Africa) Bob Hewitt / (South Africa) Frew McMillan (third round)
2. (Netherlands) Tom Okker / (United States) Marty Riessen (semifinals)
3. (United States) Arthur Ashe / (United States) Bob Lutz (third round)
4. (Romania) Ilie Năstase / (Spain) Manuel Orantes (second round)

Click on the seed number of a player to go to their draw section.

== Draw ==
=== Key ===
- Q = Qualifier
- WC = Wild card
- LL = Lucky loser
- Alt = Alternate
- ITF = ITF entry
- PR = Protected ranking
- SR = Special ranking
- SE = Special exempt
- JE = Junior exempt
- JR = Junior Accelerator Programme entrant
- CO = College Accelerator Programme entrant
- NG = Next Gen Accelerator Program entrant
- w/o = Walkover
- r = Retired
- d = Defaulted

=== Finals ===
Quarterfinals
2	(Netherlands) Tom Okker (United States) Marty Riessen	6	6	6
(United States) Dick Dell (United States) Sherwood Stewart	0	7	4
(United States) Jimmy Connors (United States) Pancho Gonzales	6	6
(Australia) Terry Addison (Australia) Bob Carmichael	4	4
(Australia) John Alexander (Australia) Phil Dent	6	3
(Egypt) Ismail El Shafei (New Zealand) Brian Fairlie	7	6
(Australia) Fred Stolle (United Kingdom) Roger Taylor	6	6
(Socialist Federal Republic of Yugoslavia) Nikola Pilić (Australia) Allan Stone	4	4

Semifinals
2	(Netherlands) Tom Okker (United States) Marty Riessen	5	4
(United States) Jimmy Connors (United States) Pancho Gonzales	7	6
(Egypt) Ismail El Shafei (New Zealand) Brian Fairlie	7	7
(Australia) Fred Stolle (United Kingdom) Roger Taylor	6	6

Final
(United States) Jimmy Connors (United States) Pancho Gonzales	6	7
(Egypt) Ismail El Shafei (New Zealand) Brian Fairlie	3	6

=== Top half ===
==== Section 1 ====
First Round

Second Round
2	(Netherlands) Tom Okker (United States) Marty Riessen	6	6
(United States) William Brown (United States) Franklin Robbins	1	1
(United States) Jeff Borowiak (Pakistan) Haroon Rahim	6	6
(United States) Steve Krulevitz (United Kingdom) Stephen Warboys	2	3
(United States) Frank Froehling (United States) Charlie Pasarell	4	2
(United States) Mike Estep (United States) Charles Owens	6	6
(United Kingdom) Mark Cox (United Kingdom) Graham Stilwell	4	7	6
(United States) Dick Dell (United States) Sherwood Stewart	6	6	7

Third Round
2	(Netherlands) Tom Okker (United States) Marty Riessen	6	7
(United States) Jeff Borowiak (Pakistan) Haroon Rahim	2	6
(United States) Mike Estep (United States) Charles Owens	6	6
(United States) Dick Dell (United States) Sherwood Stewart	7	7

Quarterfinals
2	(Netherlands) Tom Okker (United States) Marty Riessen	6	6	6
(United States) Dick Dell (United States) Sherwood Stewart	0	7	4

==== Section 2 ====
First Round
(France) Pierre Barthès (United States) Billy Martin	5	6	6
(United States) Rick Fisher (United States) Paul Sidone	7	2	2
(United States) Jimmy Connors (United States) Pancho Gonzales	6	6	6
(United States) Tom Edlefsen (Mexico) Marcello Lara	7	0	4
(United States) Roy Barth (United States) Tom Leonard	6	5	6
(New Zealand) Onny Parun (New Zealand) Jeff Simpson	4	7	2
(Australia) Terry Addison (Australia) Bob Carmichael	7	6
(United States) Scott Carnahan (United States) William Wright	6	2
(Sweden) Björn Borg (Sweden) Ove Bengtson	2	6	3
(United States) Eddie Dibbs (United States) Dennis Ralston	6	3	6
(Australia) Colin Dibley (Australia) Ian Fletcher	6	6
(United States) Joe Ragland (United States) Mark Shires	3	3
(United States) Brian Gottfried (United States) Paul Gerken	6	2	6
(South Africa) Bob Maud (Rhodesia) Andrew Pattison	4	6	4

Second Round
3	(United States) Arthur Ashe (United States) Bob Lutz	7	6
(France) Pierre Barthès (United States) Billy Martin	6	4
(United States) Jimmy Connors (United States) Pancho Gonzales	6	3	6
(United States) Roy Barth (United States) Tom Leonard	3	6	1
(Australia) Terry Addison (Australia) Bob Carmichael	6	6
(United States) Eddie Dibbs (United States) Dennis Ralston	3	3
(Australia) Colin Dibley (Australia) Ian Fletcher	6	6
(United States) Brian Gottfried (United States) Paul Gerken	0	1

Third Round
3	(United States) Arthur Ashe (United States) Bob Lutz	7	4	3
(United States) Jimmy Connors (United States) Pancho Gonzales	6	6	6
(Australia) Terry Addison (Australia) Bob Carmichael	3	6	7
(Australia) Colin Dibley (Australia) Ian Fletcher	6	2	5

Quarterfinals
(United States) Jimmy Connors (United States) Pancho Gonzales	6	6
(Australia) Terry Addison (Australia) Bob Carmichael	4	4

=== Bottom half ===
==== Section 3 ====
First Round
(France) Jean-Baptiste Chanfreau (France) Wanaro N'Godrella	6	6	4
(Chile) Jaime Fillol (United States) Jim McManus	7	4	6
(United States) Gene Stuart Malin; Unknown	2	2
(United States) Tom Gorman (United States) Erik van Dillen	6	6
(South Africa) Pat Cramer (South Africa) Raymond Moore	3	6	2
(India) Anand Amritraj (India) Vijay Amritraj	6	4	6
(Jamaica) Richard Russell (South Africa) Rayno Seegers
(Australia) John Alexander (Australia) Phil Dent	w/o
Unknown; Unknown	4	0
(United States) Alex Olmedo (United States) Roscoe Tanner	6	6
(Czechoslovakia) Milan Holeček (United States) Dick Stockton	4	0
(Egypt) Ismail El Shafei (New Zealand) Brian Fairlie	6	6

Second Round
(Chile) Jaime Fillol (United States) Jim McManus	4	7	6
(United States) Tom Gorman (United States) Erik van Dillen	6	5	4
(India) Anand Amritraj (India) Vijay Amritraj	5	7	2
(Australia) John Alexander (Australia) Phil Dent	7	6	6
(United States) Alex Olmedo (United States) Roscoe Tanner	6	2
(Egypt) Ismail El Shafei (New Zealand) Brian Fairlie	7	6
(United Kingdom) Gerald Battrick (France) Patrice Dominguez	6	4	7
4	(Romania) Ilie Năstase (Spain) Manuel Orantes	3	6	6

Third Round
(Chile) Jaime Fillol (United States) Jim McManus	6	3	4
(Australia) John Alexander (Australia) Phil Dent	4	6	6
(Egypt) Ismail El Shafei (New Zealand) Brian Fairlie	6	6
(United Kingdom) Gerald Battrick (France) Patrice Dominguez	0	4

Quarterfinals
(Australia) John Alexander (Australia) Phil Dent	6	3
(Egypt) Ismail El Shafei (New Zealand) Brian Fairlie	7	6

==== Section 4 ====
First Round

Second Round
(Argentina) Lito Álvarez (United States) Jeff Austin	6	6	6
(Australia) Ross Case (Australia) Geoff Masters	7	3	4
(United States) Mike Machette (Mexico) Raúl Ramírez	6	3	4
(Australia) Fred Stolle (United Kingdom) Roger Taylor	4	6	6
(United States) Robert Kreiss (United States) Mike Kreiss
(Socialist Federal Republic of Yugoslavia) Nikola Pilić (Australia) Allan Stone	w/o
(United States) John Andrews (India) Sashi Menon	4	6	2
1	(South Africa) Bob Hewitt (South Africa) Frew McMillan	6	3	6

Third Round
(Argentina) Lito Álvarez (United States) Jeff Austin	6	6
(Australia) Fred Stolle (United Kingdom) Roger Taylor	7	7
(Socialist Federal Republic of Yugoslavia) Nikola Pilić (Australia) Allan Stone	6	7
1	(South Africa) Bob Hewitt (South Africa) Frew McMillan	4	6

Quarterfinals
(Australia) Fred Stolle (United Kingdom) Roger Taylor	6	6
(Socialist Federal Republic of Yugoslavia) Nikola Pilić (Australia) Allan Stone	4	4
