= 1972 Pacific Southwest Open – Singles =

Singles
- 1972 Pacific Southwest Open

Final
- Champion: (United States) Stan Smith
- Runner-up: (United States) Roscoe Tanner
- Score: 6–4, 6–4

Details
- Draw: 64 (8Q)
- Seeds: 16

Events
Singles	Doubles
← 1971 ·	Los Angeles Open	· 1973 →

The 1972 Pacific Southwest Open – Singles was an event of the 1972 Pacific Southwest Open tennis tournament and was played on outdoor hard courts at the Los Angeles Tennis Center in Los Angeles, California in the United States between September 18 and September 24, 1970. The draw comprised 64 players of which 16 were seeded. Eight players qualified via a 64-man qualifying and a 203-man pre-qualifying event. Pancho Gonzales was the defending Pacific Southwest Open champion but was defeated in the quarterfinals. Third-seeded Stan Smith won the title by defeating 13th-seeded Roscoe Tanner in the final, 6–4, 6–4.

== Seeds ==
1. (Romania) Ilie Năstase (third round)
2. (United States) Arthur Ashe (third round)
3. (United States) Stan Smith (champion)
4. (Australia) Ken Rosewall (quarterfinals)
5. (Spain) Manuel Orantes (quarterfinals)
6. (United States) Marty Riessen (third round)
7. (United States) Bob Lutz (first round)
8. (Netherlands) Tom Okker (semifinals)
9. (Australia) Fred Stolle (first round)
10. (United States) Charlie Pasarell (first round)
11. (United Kingdom) Mark Cox (second round)
12. (United States) Tom Gorman (semifinals)
13. (United States) Roscoe Tanner (final)
14. (South Africa) Bob Hewitt (third round)
15. (United States) Jimmy Connors (third round)
16. (United Kingdom) Roger Taylor (second round)

Click on the seed number of a player to go to their draw section.

== Draw ==
=== Key ===
- Q = Qualifier
- WC = Wild card
- LL = Lucky loser
- Alt = Alternate
- ITF = ITF entry
- PR = Protected ranking
- SR = Special ranking
- SE = Special exempt
- JE = Junior exempt
- JR = Junior Accelerator Programme entrant
- CO = College Accelerator Programme entrant
- NG = Next Gen Accelerator Program entrant
- w/o = Walkover
- r = Retired
- d = Defaulted

=== Finals ===
Quarterfinals
13	(United States) Roscoe Tanner	7	6
5	(Spain) Manuel Orantes	6	4
4	(Australia) Ken Rosewall	7	2	3
8	(Netherlands) Tom Okker	5	6	6
(South Africa) Raymond Moore	6	6	3
3	(United States) Stan Smith	7	4	6
12	(United States) Tom Gorman	6	4	6
(Australia) Bob Carmichael	4	6	3

Semifinals
13	(United States) Roscoe Tanner	6	7
8	(Netherlands) Tom Okker	4	6
3	(United States) Stan Smith	6	3	6
12	(United States) Tom Gorman	4	6	3

Final
13	(United States) Roscoe Tanner	4	4
3	(United States) Stan Smith	6	6

=== Top half ===
==== Section 1 ====
First Round
1	(Romania) Ilie Năstase	6	7
(Australia) John Cooper	2	5
(France) Pierre Barthès	6	1
(United States) Tom Edlefsen	7	6
13	(United States) Roscoe Tanner	6	7	6
(Australia) Ian Fletcher	7	6	3
(United States) Pancho Gonzales	6	7
(Sweden) Ove Bengtson	4	6
5	(Spain) Manuel Orantes	6	6
(South Africa) Bob Maud	4	2
(United States) Frank Froehling	5	2
(France) Patrice Dominguez	7	6
10	(United States) Charlie Pasarell	6	3	6
(United States) Jim McManus	4	6	7
(Australia) John Alexander	6	6
(United States) Alex Olmedo	3	4

Second Round
1	(Romania) Ilie Năstase	7	6
(United States) Tom Edlefsen	6	3
13	(United States) Roscoe Tanner	7	7
(United States) Pancho Gonzales	6	6
5	(Spain) Manuel Orantes	6	6	7
(France) Patrice Dominguez	7	4	5
(United States) Jim McManus	6	3
(Australia) John Alexander	7	6

Third Round
1	(Romania) Ilie Năstase	7	4	2
13	(United States) Roscoe Tanner	5	6	6
5	(Spain) Manuel Orantes	6	6	7
(Australia) John Alexander	4	7	6

Quarterfinals
13	(United States) Roscoe Tanner	7	6
5	(Spain) Manuel Orantes	6	4

==== Section 2 ====
First Round
4	(Australia) Ken Rosewall	6	6
(South Africa) Pat Cramer	2	2
(Pakistan) Haroon Rahim	6	6	6
(United States) Roy Barth	4	7	3
15	(United States) Jimmy Connors	6	6
(United States) Paul Gerken	4	2
(Egypt) Ismail El Shafei	6	6
(United States) Jeff Austin	4	4
8	(Netherlands) Tom Okker	6	6
(India) Anand Amritraj	2	0
(Australia) Colin Dibley	4	2
(United States) Mike Estep	6	6
11	(United Kingdom) Mark Cox	7	6
(France) Wanaro N'Godrella	6	2
(United States) Jeff Borowiak	6	5	6
(Australia) Ross Case	3	7	3

Second Round
4	(Australia) Ken Rosewall	6	6
(Pakistan) Haroon Rahim	3	4
15	(United States) Jimmy Connors	6	6
(Egypt) Ismail El Shafei	2	4
8	(Netherlands) Tom Okker	6	6
(United States) Mike Estep	1	3
11	(United Kingdom) Mark Cox	4	4
(United States) Jeff Borowiak	6	6

Third Round
4	(Australia) Ken Rosewall	6	6
15	(United States) Jimmy Connors	3	2
8	(Netherlands) Tom Okker	6	6
(United States) Jeff Borowiak	3	4

Quarterfinals
4	(Australia) Ken Rosewall	7	2	3
8	(Netherlands) Tom Okker	5	6	6

=== Bottom half ===
==== Section 3 ====
First Round
(United States) William Brown	2^{r}
(Chile) Jaime Fillol	4
(Czechoslovakia) Milan Holeček	6	6
9	(Australia) Fred Stolle	1	3
(South Africa) Raymond Moore	6	7
(New Zealand) Onny Parun	1	5
(Mexico) Raúl Ramírez	7	6
7	(United States) Bob Lutz	6	3
(Australia) Allan Stone	4	3
(Socialist Federal Republic of Yugoslavia) Nikola Pilić	6	6
(United States) Brian Gottfried	7	3	4
14	(South Africa) Bob Hewitt	5	6	6
(New Zealand) Brian Fairlie	7	6
(United Kingdom) Gerald Battrick	6	2
(India) Vijay Amritraj	2	6
3	(United States) Stan Smith	6	7

Second Round
(Chile) Jaime Fillol	7	6
(Czechoslovakia) Milan Holeček	6	3
(South Africa) Raymond Moore	6	6
(Mexico) Raúl Ramírez	3	4
(Socialist Federal Republic of Yugoslavia) Nikola Pilić	6	0
14	(South Africa) Bob Hewitt	7	6
(New Zealand) Brian Fairlie	7	3	3
3	(United States) Stan Smith	6	6	6

Third Round
(Chile) Jaime Fillol	3	7	6
(South Africa) Raymond Moore	6	6	7
14	(South Africa) Bob Hewitt	3	6	3
3	(United States) Stan Smith	6	4	6

Quarterfinals
(South Africa) Raymond Moore	6	6	3
3	(United States) Stan Smith	7	4	6

==== Section 4 ====
First Round
(United States) Dick Stockton	4
(Australia) Ray Ruffels	2^{r}
(United States) Rick Fisher	3	5
12	(United States) Tom Gorman	6	7
(France) Jean-Baptiste Chanfreau	7	6	1
(South Africa) Frew McMillan	6	7	6
(Australia) Geoff Masters	4	2
6	(United States) Marty Riessen	6	6
(United States) Erik van Dillen	6	6	3
(Australia) Bob Carmichael	7	3	6
(United States) Charles Owens	6	3	1
16	(United Kingdom) Roger Taylor	1	6	6
(United Kingdom) Graham Stilwell	3	1
(Rhodesia) Andrew Pattison	6	6
(United States) Eddie Dibbs	7	3	5
2	(United States) Arthur Ashe	6	6	7

Second Round
(United States) Dick Stockton	3	4
12	(United States) Tom Gorman	6	6
(South Africa) Frew McMillan	2	4
6	(United States) Marty Riessen	6	6
(Australia) Bob Carmichael	7	6
16	(United Kingdom) Roger Taylor	5	2
(Rhodesia) Andrew Pattison	4	4
2	(United States) Arthur Ashe	6	6

Third Round
12	(United States) Tom Gorman	7	6	6
6	(United States) Marty Riessen	5	7	2
(Australia) Bob Carmichael	6	4	6
2	(United States) Arthur Ashe	3	6	3

Quarterfinals
12	(United States) Tom Gorman	6	4	6
(Australia) Bob Carmichael	4	6	3
