= 1973 Rainier International Tennis Classic – Singles =

Tennis tournament event

Singles
- 1973 Rainier International Tennis Classic

Final
- Champion: (Netherlands) Tom Okker
- Runner-up: (Australia) John Alexander
- Score: 7–5, 6–4

Details
- Draw: 32

Events
Singles	Doubles
← 1972 ·	Rainier International Tennis Classic	· 1974 →

The 1973 Rainier International Tennis Classic – Singles was an event of the 1973 Rainier International Tennis Classic tennis tournament played at the Seattle Center Arena in Seattle, Washington, in the United States between September 10 and September 16, 1973. Ilie Năstase was the defending champion, but did not compete in this edition. Second-seeded Tom Okker won the singles title, defeating John Alexander 7–5, 6–4 in the final.

== Seeds ==
1. (United States) Arthur Ashe (quarterfinals)
2. (Netherlands) Tom Okker (champion)
3. (United States) Tom Gorman (semifinals)
4. (United States) Cliff Richey (semifinals)
5. (United Kingdom) Mark Cox (quarterfinals)
6. (United States) Brian Gottfried (quarterfinals)
7. (Chile) Jaime Fillol (first round)
8. (Australia) John Alexander (final)

== Draw ==
=== Key ===
- Q = Qualifier
- WC = Wild card
- LL = Lucky loser
- Alt = Alternate
- SE = Special exempt
- PR = Protected ranking
- ITF = ITF entry
- JE = Junior exempt
- w/o = Walkover
- r = Retired
- d = Defaulted
- SR = Special ranking

=== Finals ===
Semifinals
2	(Netherlands) Tom Okker	6	7
3	(United States) Tom Gorman	3	6
4	(United States) Cliff Richey	6	6	6
8	(Australia) John Alexander	7	0	7

Final
2	(Netherlands) Tom Okker	7	6
8	(Australia) John Alexander	5	4

=== Top half ===
First Round
2	(Netherlands) Tom Okker	6	6
(United States) William Higgins	4	3
(South Africa) Frew McMillan	6	7
(United States) William Brown	3	6
7	(Chile) Jaime Fillol	1	6	5
(United States) Robert Kreiss	6	2	7
(Denmark) Torben Ulrich	6	6
(South Africa) Terry Ryan	2	3
3	(United States) Tom Gorman	6	6
(Pakistan) Saeed Meer	2	2
(Czech Republic) Milan Holeček	3	6	6
(Australia) Kim Warwick	6	2	7
5	(United Kingdom) Mark Cox	6	6
(Australia) William Lloyd	2	2
(United States) Mike Estep	6	5	0^{d}
(South Africa) Pat Cramer	4	7	0

Second Round
2	(Netherlands) Tom Okker	6	6
(South Africa) Frew McMillan	1	4
(United States) Robert Kreiss	3	6
(Denmark) Torben Ulrich	6	7
3	(United States) Tom Gorman	6	2	6
(Australia) Kim Warwick	0	6	3
5	(United Kingdom) Mark Cox	6	6
(South Africa) Pat Cramer	2	1

Quarterfinals
2	(Netherlands) Tom Okker	6	6
(Denmark) Torben Ulrich	2	2
3	(United States) Tom Gorman	4	6	6
5	(United Kingdom) Mark Cox	6	1	4

Semifinals
2	(Netherlands) Tom Okker	6	7
3	(United States) Tom Gorman	3	6

=== Bottom half ===
First Round
(United States) Dick Knight	6	3	4
(Australia) John Bartlett	2	6	6
(France) Jean-Baptiste Chanfreau	2	6
6	(United States) Brian Gottfried	6	7
(United States) Robert McKinley	7	7
(United States) Brian Teacher	6	6
(United States) Steve Faulk	3	1
4	(United States) Cliff Richey	6	6
(Australia) Bob Carmichael	6	6
(United States) Steve Tidball	4	2
(United Kingdom) Gerald Battrick	6	1	6
8	(Australia) John Alexander	4	6	7
(United States) Sherwood Stewart	6	6
(United Kingdom) Graham Stilwell	3	2
(United States) Gary Groslimond	2	5
1	(United States) Arthur Ashe	6	7

Second Round
(Australia) John Bartlett	4	4
6	(United States) Brian Gottfried	6	6
(United States) Robert McKinley	0	4
4	(United States) Cliff Richey	6	6
(Australia) Bob Carmichael	4	7	4
8	(Australia) John Alexander	6	5	6
(United States) Sherwood Stewart	4	4
1	(United States) Arthur Ashe	6	6

Quarterfinals
6	(United States) Brian Gottfried	4	6	2
4	(United States) Cliff Richey	6	2	6
8	(Australia) John Alexander	6	6
1	(United States) Arthur Ashe	1	2

Semifinals
4	(United States) Cliff Richey	6	6	6
8	(Australia) John Alexander	7	0	7
