= 1973 Rainier International Tennis Classic – Doubles =

Tennis tournament event

Doubles
- 1973 Rainier International Tennis Classic

Final
- Champion: (United States) Tom Gorman (Netherlands) Tom Okker
- Runner-up: (Australia) Bob Carmichael (South Africa) Frew McMillan
- Score: 2–6, 6–4, 7–6

Details
- Draw: 16

Events
Singles	Doubles
← 1972 ·	Rainier International Tennis Classic	· 1974 →

The 1973 Rainier International Tennis Classic – Doubles was an event of the 1973 Rainier International Tennis Classic tennis tournament played at the Seattle Center Arena in Seattle, Washington in the United States between September 10 and September 16, 1973. Geoff Masters and Ross Case were the defending champions, but did not compete in this edition. Tom Gorman and Tom Okker won the doubles title, defeating Bob Carmichael and Frew McMillan in the final 7–5, 6–4.

== Draw ==
=== Key ===
- Q = Qualifier
- WC = Wild card
- LL = Lucky loser
- Alt = Alternate
- SE = Special exempt
- PR = Protected ranking
- ITF = ITF entry
- JE = Junior exempt
- w/o = Walkover
- r = Retired
- d = Defaulted
- SR = Special ranking

First Round
(Australia) Bob Carmichael (South Africa) Frew McMillan	6	6
(United States) Gary Groslimond (United States) Steve Tidball	4	4
(France) Jean-Baptiste Chanfreau (Pakistan) Saeed Meer	7	6	3
(Canada) Tony Bardsley (United States) William Brown	5	7	6
(Australia) John Alexander (United Kingdom) Mark Cox	6	6
(United States) William Higgins (United States) Dick Knight	4	3
(South Africa) Pat Cramer (South Africa) Terry Ryan	7	7
(United States) Cliff Richey (Denmark) Torben Ulrich	6	6
(Chile) Jaime Fillol (Czech Republic) Milan Holeček	6	3	7
(Australia) John Bartlett (United States) Robert McKinley	3	6	6
(Australia) William Lloyd (Australia) Kim Warwick	6	6	1
(United Kingdom) Gerald Battrick (United Kingdom) Graham Stilwell	7	4	6
(United States) Brian Gottfried (United States) Sherwood Stewart	6	6
(Australia) Steve Docherty (United States) Mike Prineas	3	4
(United States) Steve Faulk (United States) Robert Kreiss	5	4
(United States) Tom Gorman (Netherlands) Tom Okker	7	6

Quarterfinals
(Australia) Bob Carmichael (South Africa) Frew McMillan	6	7
(Canada) Tony Bardsley (United States) William Brown	4	6
(Australia) John Alexander (United Kingdom) Mark Cox	7	6
(South Africa) Pat Cramer (South Africa) Terry Ryan	6	0
(Chile) Jaime Fillol (Czech Republic) Milan Holeček	0	6
(United Kingdom) Gerald Battrick (United Kingdom) Graham Stilwell	6	7
(United States) Brian Gottfried (United States) Sherwood Stewart	3	4
(United States) Tom Gorman (Netherlands) Tom Okker	6	6

Semifinals
(Australia) Bob Carmichael (South Africa) Frew McMillan	6	6	6
(Australia) John Alexander (United Kingdom) Mark Cox	3	7	3
(United Kingdom) Gerald Battrick (United Kingdom) Graham Stilwell	7	3	4
(United States) Tom Gorman (Netherlands) Tom Okker	5	6	6

Final
(Australia) Bob Carmichael (South Africa) Frew McMillan	6	4	6
(United States) Tom Gorman (Netherlands) Tom Okker	2	6	7
