= 1973 Rainier International Tennis Classic =

- Date: September 10–16
- Edition: 2nd
- Category: Grand Prix (Group C)
- Draw: 32S / 16D
- Prize money: $37,500
- Surface: Carpet / indoor
- Location: Seattle, Washington, U.S.
- Venue: Seattle Center Arena

Champions

Singles
- (Netherlands) Tom Okker

Doubles
- (United States) Tom Gorman / (Netherlands) Tom Okker
- Rainier International Tennis Classic

The 1973 Rainier International Tennis Classic, also known as the Seattle International, was a men's tennis tournament staged at the Seattle Center Arena in Seattle, Washington in the United States that was part of the Grand Prix circuit and categorized as a Group C event. The tournament was played on indoor carpet courts and was held from September 10 until September 16, 1973. It was the second and last edition of the tournament and second-seeded Tom Okker won the singles title and earned $7,500 first-prize money as well as 20 ranking points.

== Finals ==
=== Singles ===
(Netherlands) Tom Okker defeated (Australia) John Alexander 7–5, 6–4

- It was Okker's 4th singles title of the year and the 24th of his career in the Open Era.

=== Doubles ===
(United States) Tom Gorman / (Netherlands) Tom Okker defeated (Australia) Bob Carmichael / (South Africa) Frew McMillan 2–6, 6–4, 7–6
