= 1971 Rothmans International Quebec – Doubles =

Tennis tournament event

Doubles
- 1971 Rothmans International Quebec

Final
- Champion: (Australia) Roy Emerson (Australia) Rod Laver
- Runner-up: (Netherlands) Tom Okker (United States) Marty Riessen
- Score: 7–6, 6–2

Details
- Draw: 15

Events
Singles	Doubles
- Quebec WCT

The 1971 Rothmans International Quebec – Doubles was an event of the 1971 Rothmans International Quebec men's tennis tournament held at the Laval University sports centre in Quebec City, Quebec in Canada from 26 July through 1 August 1971. The draw comprised 15 teams. Roy Emerson and Rod Laver won the doubles title, defeating Tom Okker and Marty Riessen in the final, 7–6, 6–2.

== Draw ==
Key

- Q = Qualifier
- WC = Wild card
- LL = Lucky loser
- Alt = Alternate
- ITF = ITF entry
- PR = Protected ranking
- SR = Special ranking
- SE = Special exempt
- JE = Junior exempt
- JR = Junior Accelerator Programme entrant
- CO = College Accelerator Programme entrant
- NG = Next Gen Accelerator Program entrant
- w/o = Walkover
- r = Retired
- d = Defaulted

First Round
(South Africa) Cliff Drysdale (Socialist Federal Republic of Yugoslavia) Nikola Pilić	7	7
(Australia) John Alexander (Australia) Phil Dent	5	6
(Australia) Ken Rosewall (Australia) Fred Stolle	7	6
(Egypt) Ismail El Shafei (New Zealand) Brian Fairlie	5	4
(Australia) Bob Carmichael (Australia) Ray Ruffels	7	7
(United States) Roy Barth (Denmark) Torben Ulrich	6	6
(United States) Bob Lutz (United States) Charlie Pasarell	7	6
(United Kingdom) Mark Cox (United Kingdom) Graham Stilwell	6	4
(Australia) Bill Bowrey (Australia) Owen Davidson	6	3	6
(United States) Arthur Ashe (United States) Ronald Holmberg	3	6	3
(South Africa) Frew McMillan (South Africa) Bob Maud	6	6
(Spain) Andrés Gimeno (United Kingdom) Roger Taylor	4	4
(Australia) Roy Emerson (Australia) Rod Laver	6	7	7
(United States) Tom Leonard (Australia) Allan Stone	7	6	6

Quarterfinals
(Netherlands) Tom Okker (United States) Marty Riessen	6	3	7
(South Africa) Cliff Drysdale (Socialist Federal Republic of Yugoslavia) Nikola Pilić	1	6	6
(Australia) Ken Rosewall (Australia) Fred Stolle	6	4	7
(Australia) Bob Carmichael (Australia) Ray Ruffels	2	6	6
(United States) Bob Lutz (United States) Charlie Pasarell	w/o
(Australia) Bill Bowrey (Australia) Owen Davidson
(South Africa) Frew McMillan (South Africa) Bob Maud	1	3
(Australia) Roy Emerson (Australia) Rod Laver	6	6

Semifinals
(Netherlands) Tom Okker (United States) Marty Riessen	6	7
(Australia) Ken Rosewall (Australia) Fred Stolle	3	6
(United States) Bob Lutz (United States) Charlie Pasarell	6	3
(Australia) Roy Emerson (Australia) Rod Laver	7	6

Final
(Netherlands) Tom Okker (United States) Marty Riessen	6	2
(Australia) Roy Emerson (Australia) Rod Laver	7	6
