= 1973 Pacific Southwest Open – Doubles =

Doubles
- 1973 Pacific Southwest Open

Final
- Champion: (Czechoslovakia) Jan Kodeš (Czechoslovakia) Vladimír Zedník
- Runner-up: (United States) Jimmy Connors (Romania) Ilie Năstase
- Score: 6–2, 6–4

Details
- Draw: 32
- Seeds: 4

Events
Singles	Doubles
← 1972 ·	Los Angeles Open	· 1974 →

The 1973 Pacific Southwest Open – Men's doubles was an event of the 1973 Pacific Southwest Open tennis tournament and was played on outdoor hard courts at the Los Angeles Tennis Center in Los Angeles, California, in the United States between September 17 and September 23, 1973. The draw comprised 32 teams of which four were seeded. Jimmy Connors and Pancho Gonzales were the defending Pacific Southwest Open doubles champions but did not compete together in this edition. Unseeded Jan Kodeš and Vladimír Zedník won the title by defeating third-seeded Jimmy Connors and Ilie Năstase in the final, 6–2, 6–4.

== Seeds ==
1. (Netherlands) Tom Okker / (United States) Marty Riessen (first round)
2. (United States) Stan Smith / (United States) Erik van Dillen (quarterfinals)
3. (United States) Jimmy Connors / (Romania) Ilie Năstase (final)
4. (Australia) Bob Carmichael / (South Africa) Frew McMillan (second round)

== Draw ==
=== Key ===
- Q = Qualifier
- WC = Wild card
- LL = Lucky loser
- Alt = Alternate
- ITF = ITF entry
- PR = Protected ranking
- SR = Special ranking
- SE = Special exempt
- JE = Junior exempt
- JR = Junior Accelerator Programme entrant
- CO = College Accelerator Programme entrant
- NG = Next Gen Accelerator Program entrant
- w/o = Walkover
- r = Retired
- d = Defaulted

=== Finals ===
Semifinals
(Australia) Roy Emerson (Australia) Ken Rosewall	4	3
3	(United States) Jimmy Connors (Romania) Ilie Năstase	6	6
(United States) Alex Olmedo (Mexico) Raúl Ramírez	6	6	6
(Czechoslovakia) Jan Kodeš (Czechoslovakia) Vladimír Zedník	3	7	7

Final
3	(United States) Jimmy Connors (Romania) Ilie Năstase	2	4
(Czechoslovakia) Jan Kodeš (Czechoslovakia) Vladimír Zedník	6	6

=== Top half ===
First Round
2	(United States) Stan Smith (United States) Erik van Dillen	6	6
(United States) Dick Leach (West Germany) Horst Ritter	3	2
(South Africa) Raymond Moore (New Zealand) Onny Parun	3	5
(Australia) William Lloyd (Australia) Kim Warwick	6	7
(Australia) Roy Emerson (Australia) Ken Rosewall	3	6	6
(United States) John Fort (United States) Greg Peebles	6	3	4
(United States) Mike Estep (United States) Brian Gottfried	6	7
(United States) Sandy Mayer (United States) Billy Martin	2	6
3	(United States) Jimmy Connors (Romania) Ilie Năstase	6	7
(Chile) Hans Gildemeister (United States) Peter Pearson	2	5
(Sweden) Ove Bengtson (United States) Jim McManus	3	6
(France) Jean-Baptiste Chanfreau (South Africa) Pat Cramer	6	7
(Australia) John Alexander (Australia) Phil Dent	7	6
(United States) Paul Gerken (United States) Robert McKinley	6	4
(United States) Charlie Pasarell (United States) Dennis Ralston	6	6
(Sweden) Birger Andersson (Sweden) Tenny Svensson	2	3

Second Round
2	(United States) Stan Smith (United States) Erik van Dillen	w/o
(Australia) William Lloyd (Australia) Kim Warwick
(Australia) Roy Emerson (Australia) Ken Rosewall	6	7
(United States) Mike Estep (United States) Brian Gottfried	4	6
3	(United States) Jimmy Connors (Romania) Ilie Năstase	4	6	6
(France) Jean-Baptiste Chanfreau (South Africa) Pat Cramer	6	4	4
(Australia) John Alexander (Australia) Phil Dent	6	6	6
(United States) Charlie Pasarell (United States) Dennis Ralston	4	7	3

Quarterfinals
2	(United States) Stan Smith (United States) Erik van Dillen	7	3	6
(Australia) Roy Emerson (Australia) Ken Rosewall	6	6	7
3	(United States) Jimmy Connors (Romania) Ilie Năstase	3	6	6
(Australia) John Alexander (Australia) Phil Dent	6	3	4

Semifinals
(Australia) Roy Emerson (Australia) Ken Rosewall	4	3
3	(United States) Jimmy Connors (Romania) Ilie Năstase	6	6

=== Bottom half ===
First Round
(United States) Roy Barth (United States) Steve Tidball	4	7	3
(United States) John Andrews (India) Sashi Menon	6	6	6
(Czechoslovakia) Milan Holeček (France) Patrick Proisy	4	1
(United States) Arthur Ashe (United States) Roscoe Tanner	6	6
(United Kingdom) John Lloyd (New Zealand) Jeff Simpson	4	4
(United States) Alex Olmedo (Mexico) Raúl Ramírez	6	6
(United States) Jeff Borowiak (Australia) John Bartlett	5	4
4	(Australia) Bob Carmichael (South Africa) Frew McMillan	7	6
(United States) Steve Faulk (United States) Robert Kreiss	4	6	7
(United States) Pancho Gonzales (United States) Cliff Richey	6	3	5
(Australia) Barry Phillips-Moore (Pakistan) Haroon Rahim	7	0	4
(Czechoslovakia) Jan Kodeš (Czechoslovakia) Vladimír Zedník	6	6	6
(United States) Dick R. Bohrnstedt (United States) Mike Machette	4	4
(United States) Jeff Austin (United States) Fred McNair	6	6
(United States) Tom Edlefsen (United States) Tom Leonard	7	6	6
1	(Netherlands) Tom Okker (United States) Marty Riessen	5	7	3

Second Round
(United States) John Andrews (India) Sashi Menon	6	6	4
(United States) Arthur Ashe (United States) Roscoe Tanner	3	7	6
(United States) Alex Olmedo (Mexico) Raúl Ramírez	4	7	6
4	(Australia) Bob Carmichael (South Africa) Frew McMillan	6	5	3
(United States) Steve Faulk (United States) Robert Kreiss	6	3	6
(Czechoslovakia) Jan Kodeš (Czechoslovakia) Vladimír Zedník	4	6	7
(United States) Jeff Austin (United States) Fred McNair	3	4
(United States) Tom Edlefsen (United States) Tom Leonard	6	6

Quarterfinals
(United States) Arthur Ashe (United States) Roscoe Tanner	6	7	3
(United States) Alex Olmedo (Mexico) Raúl Ramírez	7	6	6
(Czechoslovakia) Jan Kodeš (Czechoslovakia) Vladimír Zedník	6	7
(United States) Tom Edlefsen (United States) Tom Leonard	4	5

Semifinals
(United States) Alex Olmedo (Mexico) Raúl Ramírez	6	6	6
(Czechoslovakia) Jan Kodeš (Czechoslovakia) Vladimír Zedník	3	7	7
