= 1971 Rothmans International Quebec – Singles =

Tennis tournament event

Singles
- 1971 Rothmans International Quebec

Final
- Champion: (Netherlands) Tom Okker
- Runner-up: (Australia) Rod Laver
- Score: 6–3, 7–6, 6–7, 6–4

Details
- Draw: 30

Events
Singles	Doubles
- Quebec WCT

The 1971 Rothmans International Quebec – Singles was an event of the 1971 Rothmans International Quebec men's tennis tournament held at the Laval University sports centre in Quebec City, Quebec in Canada from 26 July through 1 August 1971. The draw comprised 30 players. Tom Okker won the singles title, defeating Rod Laver in the final, 6–3, 7–6, 6–7, 6–4.

== Draw ==
Key

- Q = Qualifier
- WC = Wild card
- LL = Lucky loser
- Alt = Alternate
- ITF = ITF entry
- PR = Protected ranking
- SR = Special ranking
- SE = Special exempt
- JE = Junior exempt
- JR = Junior Accelerator Programme entrant
- CO = College Accelerator Programme entrant
- NG = Next Gen Accelerator Program entrant
- w/o = Walkover
- r = Retired
- d = Defaulted

=== Finals ===
Semifinals
(United States) Bob Lutz	3	6	5
(Netherlands) Tom Okker	6	3	7
(South Africa) Cliff Drysdale	3	6
(Australia) Rod Laver	6	7

Final
(Netherlands) Tom Okker	6	7	6
(Australia) Rod Laver	3	6	7

=== Top half ===
First Round
(Australia) John Alexander	5	6
(South Africa) Frew McMillan	7	7
(United States) Bob Lutz	4	6	6
(United States) Roy Barth	6	4	4
(Australia) Bob Carmichael	6	7
(United States) Marty Riessen	2	6
(United States) Charlie Pasarell	7	7
(United Kingdom) Roger Taylor	6	6
(Socialist Federal Republic of Yugoslavia) Nikola Pilić	7	6
(Australia) Fred Stolle	6	4
(Netherlands) Tom Okker	6	6
(United States) Ronald Holmberg	2	2

Second Round
(United States) Arthur Ashe	6	3	6
(Denmark) Torben Ulrich	2	6	1
(South Africa) Frew McMillan	1	5
(United States) Bob Lutz	6	7
(Australia) Bob Carmichael	6	6
(United States) Charlie Pasarell	7	7
(Socialist Federal Republic of Yugoslavia) Nikola Pilić	5	4
(Netherlands) Tom Okker	7	6

Quarterfinals
(United States) Arthur Ashe	5	3
(United States) Bob Lutz	7	6
(United States) Charlie Pasarell	4	2
(Netherlands) Tom Okker	6	6

Semifinals
(United States) Bob Lutz	3	6	5
(Netherlands) Tom Okker	6	3	7

=== Bottom half ===
First Round
(South Africa) Cliff Drysdale	6	6
(Australia) Bill Bowrey	4	4
(Australia) Owen Davidson	6	6
(New Zealand) Brian Fairlie	1	2
(Australia) Ray Ruffels	7	4	6
(United Kingdom) Mark Cox	6	6	2
(Australia) Ken Rosewall	6	7
(United Kingdom) Graham Stilwell	4	5
(Australia) Roy Emerson	6	7
(United States) Tom Leonard	2	6
(Spain) Andrés Gimeno	6	7
(Australia) Phil Dent	2	6
(Egypt) Ismail El Shafei	4	2
(Australia) Allan Stone	6	6
(South Africa) Bob Maud	4	6	6
(Australia) Rod Laver	6	4	7

Second Round
(South Africa) Cliff Drysdale	6	7
(Australia) Owen Davidson	2	6
(Australia) Ray Ruffels	6	6
(Australia) Ken Rosewall	4	4
(Australia) Roy Emerson	7	7
(Spain) Andrés Gimeno	6	6
(Australia) Allan Stone	5	2
(Australia) Rod Laver	7	6

Quarterfinals
(South Africa) Cliff Drysdale	6	6
(Australia) Ray Ruffels	2	2
(Australia) Roy Emerson	6	6	6
(Australia) Rod Laver	3	7	7

Semifinals
(South Africa) Cliff Drysdale	3	6
(Australia) Rod Laver	6	7
