= 1973 Rothmans International Quebec =

- Date: 2–7 October
- Edition: 3rd
- Category: Grand Prix circuit (Group B)
- Draw: 32S / 16D
- Prize money: $50,000
- Surface: Carpet / indoor
- Location: Quebec City, Quebec, Canada
- Venue: Laval University

Champions

Singles
- (United States) Jimmy Connors

Doubles
- (Australia) Bob Carmichael / (South Africa) Frew McMillan
- Quebec WCT

The 1973 Rothmans International Quebec, also known as the Quebec International Open, was a men's professional tennis tournament that was part of Group B of the 1973 Grand Prix tennis circuit. It was held on indoor carpet courts at the Laval University sports centre in Quebec City, Quebec in Canada. It was the third and last edition of the tournament and was held from 2 October through 7 October 1973. Jimmy Connors won the singles title and earned $9,000 first-prize money.

== Finals ==
=== Singles ===
(United States) Jimmy Connors defeated (United States) Marty Riessen 6–1, 6–3, 6–7, 6–0

- It was Connors' 10th singles title of the year and the 16th of his career.

=== Doubles ===
(Australia) Bob Carmichael / (South Africa) Frew McMillan defeated (United States) Jimmy Connors / (United States) Marty Riessen 6–2, 7–6
