= 1971 Rothmans International Quebec =

- Date: 26 July – 1 August
- Edition: 1st
- Category: World Championship Tennis (WCT)
- Draw: 32S / 16D
- Prize money: $50,000
- Surface: Carpet / indoor
- Location: Quebec City, Quebec, Canada
- Venue: Laval University

Champions

Singles
- (Netherlands) Tom Okker

Doubles
- (Australia) Roy Emerson / (Australia) Rod Laver
- Quebec WCT

The 1971 Rothmans International Quebec, also known as the Quebec International Open or Quebec WCT, was a men's professional tennis tournament that was part of the 1971 World Championship Tennis circuit. It was held on indoor carpet courts at Laval University in Quebec City, Quebec in Canada. It was the inaugural edition of the tournament and was held from 26 July through 1 August 1971. Tom Okker won the singles title and earned $10,000 first-prize money.

== Finals ==
=== Singles ===
(Netherlands) Tom Okker defeated (Australia) Rod Laver 6–3, 7–6, 6–7, 6–4

- It was Okker's 2nd singles title of the year and the 19th of his career in the Open Era.

=== Doubles ===
(Australia) Roy Emerson / (Australia) Rod Laver defeated (Netherlands) Tom Okker / (United States) Marty Riessen 7–6, 6–2
