= 1972 Pacific Southwest Open =

- Date: September 18–24
- Edition: 46th
- Category: Grand Prix (Grade A)
- Draw: 64S / 64D
- Prize money: $60,000
- Surface: Hard / outdoor
- Location: Los Angeles, California, U.S.
- Venue: Los Angeles Tennis Center

Champions

Singles
- (United States) Stan Smith

Doubles
- (United States) Jimmy Connors / (United States) Pancho Gonzales
← 1971 ·	Pacific Southwest Open	· 1973 →

The 1972 Pacific Southwest Open was a men's tennis tournament played on outdoor hard courts at the Los Angeles Tennis Center in Los Angeles, California in the United States. The tournament was classified as Grade A and was part of the Grand Prix tennis circuit. It was the 46th edition of the tournament and ran from September 18 through September 24, 1972. Third-seeded Stan Smith won the singles title.

== Finals ==
=== Singles ===
(United States) Stan Smith defeated (United States) Roscoe Tanner 6–4, 6–4

=== Doubles ===
(United States) Jimmy Connors / (United States) Pancho Gonzales defeated (Egypt) Ismail El Shafei / (New Zealand) Brian Fairlie 6–3, 7–6
