= 1973 Pacific Southwest Open – Singles =

Singles
- 1973 Pacific Southwest Open

Final
- Champion: (United States) Jimmy Connors
- Runner-up: (Netherlands) Tom Okker
- Score: 7–5, 7–6^{(11–9)}

Details
- Draw: 64
- Seeds: 2

Events
Singles	Doubles
← 1972 ·	Los Angeles Open	· 1974 →

The 1973 Pacific Southwest Open – Men's singles was an event of the 1973 Pacific Southwest Open tennis tournament and was played on outdoor hard courts at the Los Angeles Tennis Center in Los Angeles, California, in the United States, between September 17 and September 23, 1973. The draw comprised 64 players of which 16 were seeded. Eight players qualified via a 64-man qualifying and a 203-man pre-qualifying event. Stan Smith was the defending Pacific Southwest Open champion but was defeated in the quarterfinals. Unseeded Jimmy Connors won the title by defeating unseeded Tom Okker in the final, 7–5, 7–6^{(11–9)}.

== Seeds ==
1. (United States) Stan Smith (quarterfinals)
2. (Romania) Ilie Năstase (semifinals)

Click on the seed number of a player to go to their draw section.

== Draw ==
=== Key ===
- Q = Qualifier
- WC = Wild card
- LL = Lucky loser
- Alt = Alternate
- ITF = ITF entry
- PR = Protected ranking
- SR = Special ranking
- SE = Special exempt
- JE = Junior exempt
- JR = Junior Accelerator Programme entrant
- CO = College Accelerator Programme entrant
- NG = Next Gen Accelerator Program entrant
- w/o = Walkover
- r = Retired
- d = Defaulted

=== Finals ===
Quarterfinals
1	(United States) Stan Smith	6	4	6
(United States) Jimmy Connors	3	6	7
(Mexico) Raúl Ramírez	7	6
(United States) Charlie Pasarell	6	2
(Netherlands) Tom Okker	6	6
(Australia) Ken Rosewall	2	3
(South Africa) Raymond Moore	3	4
2	(Romania) Ilie Năstase	6	6

Semifinals
(United States) Jimmy Connors	6	6
(Mexico) Raúl Ramírez	4	2
(Netherlands) Tom Okker	2	7	6
2	(Romania) Ilie Năstase	6	5	2

Final
(United States) Jimmy Connors	7	7
(Netherlands) Tom Okker	5	6

=== Top half ===
==== Section 1 ====
First Round
1	(United States) Stan Smith	6	6
(United States) Mike Machette	4	4
(United States) Roy Barth	7	4	6
(United States) Dick R. Bohrnstedt	6	6	7
(United States) Paul Gerken	6	4	6
(United States) Tom Leonard	4	6	4
(France) Patrick Proisy	3	1
(Chile) Jaime Fillol	6	6
(United States) Jimmy Connors	6	7
(United States) Jim McManus	2	6
(United States) Pancho Gonzales	6	6
(United States) Tom Edlefsen	4	2
(Sweden) Björn Borg	6	6	4
(Australia) Paul Kronk	7	4	6
(United States) Erik van Dillen	6	6
(United States) Robert McKinley	3	2

Second Round
1	(United States) Stan Smith	5	6	6
(United States) Dick R. Bohrnstedt	7	2	3
(United States) Paul Gerken	7	6	7
(Chile) Jaime Fillol	5	7	6
(United States) Jimmy Connors	7	6
(United States) Pancho Gonzales	6	3
(Australia) Paul Kronk	3	7	6
(United States) Erik van Dillen	6	6	4

Third Round
1	(United States) Stan Smith	6	6
(United States) Paul Gerken	3	3
(United States) Jimmy Connors	6	6
(Australia) Paul Kronk	1	2

Quarterfinals
1	(United States) Stan Smith	6	4	6
(United States) Jimmy Connors	3	6	7

==== Section 2 ====
First Round
(United States) Arthur Ashe	6	6
(Sweden) Birger Andersson	1	2
(Australia) Bob Carmichael	3	3
(Sweden) Tenny Svensson	6	6
(United States) Roscoe Tanner	7	7
(United States) Jeff Austin	6	6
(Mexico) Raúl Ramírez	6	6
(United States) Fred McNair	1	2
(United States) Marty Riessen	6	7
(United States) Dennis Ralston	2	5
(Australia) Phil Dent	6	6
(Australia) Kim Warwick	2	2
(Argentina) Lito Álvarez	4	6
(United States) Robert Kreiss	6	7
(United States) Charlie Pasarell	6	6	6
(United Kingdom) John Lloyd	2	7	2

Second Round
(United States) Arthur Ashe	7	6
(Sweden) Tenny Svensson	5	3
(United States) Roscoe Tanner	3	6
(Mexico) Raúl Ramírez	6	7
(United States) Marty Riessen	4	7	6
(Australia) Phil Dent	6	6	2
(United States) Robert Kreiss	6	2
(United States) Charlie Pasarell	7	6

Third Round
(United States) Arthur Ashe	4	6	3
(Mexico) Raúl Ramírez	6	4	6
(United States) Marty Riessen	6	6
(United States) Charlie Pasarell	7	7

Quarterfinals
(Mexico) Raúl Ramírez	7	6
(United States) Charlie Pasarell	6	2

=== Bottom half ===
==== Section 3 ====
First Round
(United States) Alex Olmedo	1	3
(Czechoslovakia) Jiří Hřebec	6	6
(United States) John Andrews	6	3	3
(Australia) Roy Emerson	3	6	6
(Sweden) Kjell Johansson	2	2
(New Zealand) Onny Parun	6	6
(United States) Steve Tidball	2	3
(Netherlands) Tom Okker	6	6
(Czechoslovakia) Vladimír Zedník	3	6
(South Africa) Frew McMillan	6	7
(United States) Jeff Borowiak	6	6
(United States) Brian Gottfried	3	3
(United States) Brian Teacher	4	4
(United States) Sandy Mayer	6	6
(France) Jean-Baptiste Chanfreau	3	4
(Australia) Ken Rosewall	6	6

Second Round
(Czechoslovakia) Jiří Hřebec	4	0
(Australia) Roy Emerson	6	6
(New Zealand) Onny Parun	6	3
(Netherlands) Tom Okker	7	6
(South Africa) Frew McMillan	3	4
(United States) Jeff Borowiak	6	6
(United States) Sandy Mayer	5	1
(Australia) Ken Rosewall	7	6

Third Round
(Australia) Roy Emerson	4	3
(Netherlands) Tom Okker	6	6
(United States) Jeff Borowiak	6	2
(Australia) Ken Rosewall	7	6

Quarterfinals
(Netherlands) Tom Okker	6	6
(Australia) Ken Rosewall	2	3

==== Section 4 ====
First Round
(Australia) Barry Phillips-Moore	6	7
(Sweden) Ove Bengtson	2	6
(New Zealand) Jeff Simpson	5	2
(United States) Cliff Richey	7	6
(Pakistan) Haroon Rahim	7	3	4
(South Africa) Raymond Moore	6	6	6
(South Africa) Pat Cramer	7	6
(Czechoslovakia) Jan Kodeš	6	3
(Australia) John Bartlett	6	4
(United States) Mike Estep	7	6
(United States) Billy Martin	0	3
(Australia) John Alexander	6	6
(Czechoslovakia) Milan Holeček	7	6
(France) Georges Goven	6	2
(Argentina) Tito Vázquez	3	4
2	(Romania) Ilie Năstase	6	6

Second Round
(Australia) Barry Phillips-Moore	4	3
(United States) Cliff Richey	6	6
(South Africa) Raymond Moore	6	3	6
(South Africa) Pat Cramer	3	6	4
(United States) Mike Estep	5	4
(Australia) John Alexander	7	6
(Czechoslovakia) Milan Holeček	3	6	2
2	(Romania) Ilie Năstase	6	2	6

Third Round
(United States) Cliff Richey	6	6	3
(South Africa) Raymond Moore	2	7	6
(Australia) John Alexander	3	2
2	(Romania) Ilie Năstase	6	6

Quarterfinals
(South Africa) Raymond Moore	3	4
2	(Romania) Ilie Năstase	6	6
