= 1972 Rainier International Tennis Classic =

- Date: September 11–17
- Edition: 1st
- Category: Grand Prix (Group C)
- Draw: 32S / 4D
- Prize money: $25,000
- Surface: Hard / outdoor
- Location: Seattle, Washington, U.S.

Champions

Singles
- (Romania) Ilie Năstase

Doubles
- (Australia) Geoff Masters / (Australia) Ross Case
Rainier International Tennis Classic	· 1973 →

The 1972 Rainier International Tennis Classic was a men's tennis tournament staged Seattle, Washington in the United States that was part of the Grand Prix circuit and categorized as a Group C event. The tournament was played on outdoor hard courts and was held from September 11 until September 17, 1972. It was the inaugural edition of the tournament and Ilie Năstase won the singles title.

== Finals ==
=== Singles ===
(Romania) Ilie Năstase defeated (United States) Tom Gorman 6–4, 3–6, 6–3

- It was Năstase's 10th singles title of the year and the 22nd of his career.

=== Doubles ===
(Australia) Geoff Masters / (Australia) Ross Case defeated (France) Jean-Baptiste Chanfreau / (France) Wanaro N'Godrella 4–6, 7–6, 6–4
