= 1973 Pacific Southwest Open =

- Date: September 17–23
- Edition: 47th
- Category: Grand Prix (Grade A)
- Draw: 64S / 32D
- Prize money: $75,000
- Surface: Hard / outdoor
- Location: Los Angeles, California, US
- Venue: Los Angeles Tennis Center

Champions

Singles
- (United States) Jimmy Connors

Doubles
- (Czechoslovakia) Jimmy Connors / (Czechoslovakia) Vladimír Zedník
- Pacific Southwest Open

The 1973 Pacific Southwest Open was a men's tennis tournament played on outdoor hard courts at the Los Angeles Tennis Center in Los Angeles, California in the United States. The tournament was classified as Grade A and was part of the Grand Prix tennis circuit. It was the 47th edition of the tournament and ran from September 17 through September 23, 1973. Jimmy Connors won the singles title and the $11,000 first place prize money.

== Finals ==
=== Singles ===
(United States) Jimmy Connors defeated (Netherlands) Tom Okker 7–5, 7–6^{(11–9)}

- It was Connors' 9th singles title of the year and the 15th of his career.

=== Doubles ===
(Czechoslovakia) Jan Kodeš / (Czechoslovakia) Vladimír Zedník defeated (United States) Jimmy Connors / (Romania) Ilie Năstase 6–2, 6–4
