= World of Doubles =

Defunct tennis tournament
- Event name: ATP World of Doubles
- Tour: Grand Prix circuit
- Founded: 1976
- Abolished: 1982
- Editions: 7
- Surface: Hard (1976–81); Clay (1982)

The World of Doubles was a defunct Grand Prix affiliated men's tennis tournament played from 1976 to 1982. It was held in Woodlands, Texas in the United States from 1976 to 1979 and in Sawgrass, Florida from 1980 to 1982. It was held on outdoor hard courts until 1981, when it switched to outdoor clay courts. The team of Brian Gottfried and Raúl Ramírez won the title three times.

== Finals ==
Year	Champion	Runner-up	Score
1976	(United States) Brian Gottfried (Mexico) Raúl Ramírez	(Australia) Phil Dent (Australia) Allan Stone	6–1, 6–4, 5–7, 7–6
1977	(Netherlands) Tom Okker (United States) Marty Riessen	(United States) Tim Gullikson (United States) Tom Gullikson	3–6, 6–3, 6–3, 4–6, 6–1
1978	(Poland) Wojciech Fibak (Netherlands) Tom Okker	(United States) Marty Riessen (United States) Sherwood Stewart	7–6, 3–6, 4–6, 7–6, 6–3
1979	(United States) Marty Riessen (United States) Sherwood Stewart	(Australia) Bob Carmichael (United States) Tim Gullikson	6–3, 2–2, RET.
1980	(United States) Brian Gottfried (Mexico) Raúl Ramírez	(United States) Robert Lutz (United States) Stan Smith	7–6, 6–4, 2–6, 7–6
1981	(Switzerland) Heinz Günthardt (Australia) Peter McNamara	(United States) Robert Lutz (United States) Stan Smith	7–6, 3–6, 7–6, 5–7, 6–4
1982	(United States) Brian Gottfried (Mexico) Raúl Ramírez	(Australia) Mark Edmondson (Australia) Kim Warwick	W/O

== See also ==
- WCT World Doubles
