= 1971 Pacific Southwest Open =

Tennis tournament

- Date: September 20–26
- Edition: 45th
- Category: Grand Prix
- Draw: 64S / 32D
- Prize money: $60,000
- Surface: Hard / outdoor
- Location: Los Angeles, California, U.S.
- Venue: Los Angeles Tennis Center

Champions

Men's singles
- (United States) Pancho Gonzales

Women's singles
- (United States) Billie Jean King and (United States) Rosie Casals

Men's doubles
- (Australia) John Alexander / (Australia) Phil Dent

Women's doubles
- (United States) Rosie Casals / (United States) Billie Jean King
← 1970 ·	Los Angeles Open	· 1972 →

The 1971 Pacific Southwest Open was a combined men's and women's tennis tournament played on outdoor hard courts at the Los Angeles Tennis Center in Los Angeles, California in the United States and was part of the 1971 Grand Prix tennis circuit. It was the 45th edition of the tournament and ran from September 20 through September 26, 1971. Pancho Gonzales, aged 43, won the men's singles title and $10,000 first prize money.

The women's singles title was divided between Billie Jean King and Rosie Casals. 1971 was the last year this tournament was a combined men's and women's event. That year, a separate Los Angeles based professional women's tournament was inaugurated: The LA Women's Tennis Championships.

== Finals ==
=== Men's singles ===
(United States) Pancho Gonzales defeated (United States) Jimmy Connors 2–6, 6–3, 6–3

=== Women's singles ===
(United States) Billie Jean King defeated (United States) Rosie Casals 6–6, div.

=== Men's doubles ===
(Australia) John Alexander / (Australia) Phil Dent defeated (United States) Frank Froehling / (United States) Clark Graebner 7–6, 6–4

=== Women's doubles ===
(United States) Rosie Casals / (United States) Billie Jean King defeated (France) Françoise Dürr / (Australia) Judy Tegart Dalton 6–2, 5–7, 7–6
