= Rainier Seattle Tennis Classic =

Rainier International Tennis Classic

Defunct tennis tournament
- Tour: Grand Prix circuit
- Founded: 1972
- Abolished: 1976
- Editions: 3
- Location: Seattle, United States
- Surface: Hard / outdoor

The Rainier Seattle Tennis Classic was a men's tennis tournament played in outdoor hard courts in Seattle, Washington founded in 1972 as the Rainier International Tennis Classic that was staged until 1973, then revived again in 1976 and rebranded. The event was part of the Grand Prix tennis circuit.

== Finals ==
=== Singles ===
Year	Champions	Runners-up	Score
1972	(Romania) Ilie Năstase	(United States) Tom Gorman	6–4, 3–6, 6–3
1973	(Netherlands) Tom Okker	(Australia) John Alexander	7–5, 6–4
1976	(United States) Jeff Borowiak	(United States) Tom Gorman	6–4, 7–6

=== Doubles ===
Year	Champions	Runners-up	Score
1972	(Australia) Ross Case (Australia) Geoff Masters	(France) Jean-Baptiste Chanfreau (France) Wanaro N'Godrella	4–6, 7–6, 6–4
1973	(United States) Tom Gorman (Netherlands) Tom Okker	(Australia) Bob Carmichael (South Africa) Frew McMillan	2–6, 6–4, 7–6
1976	(United States) Marty Riessen (United States) Tom Gorman	(United States) Charlie Pasarell (South Africa) Ray Moore	7–5, 7–6
