= Quebec WCT =

Quebec WCT / Quebec Open

Defunct tennis tournament
- Event name: Rothman's International WCT
- Tour: World Championship Tennis (1971–72); Grand Prix tennis circuit (1973)
- Founded: 1971
- Abolished: 1973
- Editions: 3
- Location: PEPS, Quebec City, Quebec, Canada
- Surface: Hard / Indoor

The Quebec WCT (also known as Quebec Open in 1973) was a men's tennis tournament played in Quebec City, Quebec, Canada as part of the World Championship Tennis from 1971 to 1972 and the Grand Prix tennis circuit in 1973.

== Finals ==
=== Singles ===
Year	Champions	Runners-up	Score
1971	(Netherlands) Tom Okker	(Australia) Rod Laver	6–3, 7–6, 6–7, 6–4
1972	(United States) Marty Riessen	(Australia) Rod Laver	7–5, 6–2, 7–5
1973	(United States) Jimmy Connors	(United States) Marty Riessen	6–1, 6–4, 6–7, 6–0

=== Doubles ===
Year	Champions	Runners-up	Score
1971	(Australia) Roy Emerson (Australia) Rod Laver	(Netherlands) Tom Okker (United States) Marty Riessen	7–6, 6–2
1972	(Australia) Bob Carmichael (Australia) Ray Ruffels	(Australia) Terry Addison (Australia) John Alexander	4–6, 6–3 7–5
1973	(Australia) Bob Carmichael (South Africa) Frew McMillan	(United States) Jimmy Connors (United States) Marty Riessen	6–2, 7–6
