= Tom Gorman (tennis) =

American tennis player

- Country (sports): United States
- Born: January 19, 1946 (age 80) Seattle, Washington, US
- Height: 5 ft 11 in (1.80 m)
- Turned pro: 1968 (amateur from 1966)
- Retired: 1981
- Plays: Right-handed (one-handed backhand)

Singles
- Career record: 415–293 in pre Open-Era & Open Era
- Career titles: 9
- Highest ranking: No. 8 (1973, World's Top 10)

Grand Slam singles results
- Australian Open: 2R (1970, 1977^{Jan})
- French Open: SF (1973)
- Wimbledon: SF (1971)
- US Open: SF (1972)

Other tournaments
- Tour Finals: SF (1972)

Doubles
- Career record: 205–168
- Career titles: 9

Team competitions
- Davis Cup: W (1972)

Tom Gorman (born January 19, 1946) is a retired American tennis player and coach. He won nine singles and nine doubles titles during his career and reached the semifinals in the three of the four Grand Slam events. His ATP ranking peaked at No. 8 in 1973.

== Career ==
He attended Seattle Preparatory School and was the Washington State high school tennis champion three years in a row. Gorman attended and graduated from Seattle University and was a two time All-American. He played in professional tour events in the 1960s, 1970s, and 1980s.

Gorman was ranked as high as world No. 8 (consensus) for the year 1973 and No. 10 on the ATP rankings (achieving that ranking on May 1 and June 3, 1974).

Gorman won nine singles titles in his career, the biggest coming in 1975 at Cincinnati. He also won nine doubles titles, including the Paris Open in 1971, the same year he reached the French Open doubles final with compatriot Stan Smith. Gorman defeated Björn Borg to win the Stockholm Indoor event in November 1973.

He reached the semifinal round in singles at Wimbledon in 1971, after defeating the top seed and four-time Wimbledon champion Rod Laver in the quarterfinal in straight sets. Gorman later called it the best match he ever played. He also reached the semifinals at the US Open (in 1972), and the French Open (in 1973), in both cases losing to eventual champion Ilie Năstase.

Gorman was a member of the winning U.S. Davis Cup team in 1972. Gorman was appointed captain of the U.S. Davis Cup team in 1985, succeeding Arthur Ashe, and held that position for eight years. He led the team to victory in 1990 and 1992. In 1992 he captained the American dream team made up of champions Andre Agassi, Jim Courier, John McEnroe, and Pete Sampras, faced with the task of dealing with entourages and egos. Gorman holds the record for most match wins (18) by a U.S. Davis Cup captain, shared wth Patrick McEnroe and is the most current American to have won the Davis Cup as a player and a captain.

He was named coach of the Men's U.S Olympic Tennis teams in Seoul, South Korea and Barcelona, Spain. He guided the American doubles team of Ken Flach and Robert Seguso to a gold medal in the doubles competition in Seoul in 1988.

Gorman received praise for his sportsmanship during his 1972 Masters semifinal against Stan Smith in Barcelona. He had injured his back during the course of match, but opened up a 7–6, 6–7, 7–5, 5–4 40–30 lead and held a match point. Knowing that if he were to win the match he would be in no condition to play in the final against Ilie Năstase, he told the umpire that he could not continue and retired. This allowed Smith to instead play in the final, where he was beaten by Năstase in five sets.

In November 2008, Gorman was named Director of Tennis at La Quinta Resort & Club and PGA West which he, along with other top American players including Arthur Ashe, Stan Smith, and Charlie Pasarell, help found in La Quinta, California. He retired from La Quinta in September 2015.

Gorman was appointed to the seven person International Tennis Federation Davis Cup Committee for a two-year term in 2012–14.

== Family ==
Gorman and his wife Danni have two grown daughters, Hailey and KellyAnn, and they make their home at Reynolds Lake Oconee in Greensboro, GA. He retired from La Quinta in September 2015.

== Career finals ==
=== Singles: 24 (9 titles / 15 runner-ups) ===
Result	W-L	Date	Tournament	Surface	Opponent	Score
Loss	0–1	Jul 1968	Cincinnati, US	Clay	(United States) William Harris	6–3, 2–6, 2–6
Loss	0–2	Jun 1969	Beckenham, UK	Grass	(Sweden) Ove Bengtson	4–6, 5–7
Win	1–2	Mar 1970	Caracas, Venezuela	Hard	(United Kingdom) Gerald Battrick	6–2, 6–4, 3–6, 6–4
Loss	1–3	Jun 1970	Manchester, UK	Grass	(United States) Bob Lutz	2–6, 7–9
Loss	1–4	Aug 1970	Columbus, US	Clay	(United States) Bob Lutz	5–7, 6–1, 4–6, 2–6
Loss	1–5	Nov 1970	London, UK	Carpet (i)	(Australia) John Alexander	7–5, 6–7, 6–7
Win	2–5	Aug 1971	Columbus, US	Clay	(United States) Jimmy Connors	6–7, 7–6, 4–6, 7–6, 6–3
Loss	2–6	Sep 1972	Seattle, US	Other	(Romania) Ilie Năstase	4–6, 6–3, 3–6
Loss	2–7	Nov 1972	London, UK	Carpet (i)	(Romania) Ilie Năstase	4–6, 3–6
Win	3–7	Mar 1973	Caracas, Venezuela	Hard	(France) Francois Jauffret	6–3, 7–6, 6–3
Win	4–7	Apr 1973	Vancouver WCT, Canada	Other	(Czechoslovakia) Jan Kodeš	3–6, 6–2, 7–5
Win	5–7	Nov 1973	Stockholm, Sweden	Hard (i)	(Sweden) Björn Borg	6–3, 4–6, 7–6^{(7–5)}
Loss	5–8	Feb 1974	Richmond WCT, US	Carpet (i)	(Romania) Ilie Năstase	2–6, 3–6
Loss	5–9	Mar 1974	Miami WCT, US	Hard	(South Africa) Cliff Drysdale	4–6, 5–7
Loss	5–10	Mar 1974	Rotterdam, Netherlands	Carpet (i)	(Netherlands) Tom Okker	6–4, 6–7, 1–6
Loss	5–11	Jun 1974	Beckenham, UK	Grass	(India) Vijay Amritraj	7–6, 2–6, 4–6
Win	6–11	Aug 1975	Cincinnati, US	Clay	(United States) Sherwood Stewart	7–5, 2–6, 6–4
Win	7–11	Nov 1975	Hong Kong	Hard	(United States) Sandy Mayer	6–3, 6–1, 6–1
Win	8–11	Jan 1976	Baltimore, US	Carpet (i)	(Romania) Ilie Năstase	7–5, 6–3
Win	9–11	Apr 1976	Sacramento, US	Carpet (i)	(Australia) Bob Carmichael	6–2, 6–4
Loss	9–12	Nov 1977	Hong Kong	Hard	(Australia) Ken Rosewall	3–6, 7–5, 4–6, 4–6
Loss	9–13	Jan 1978	Baltimore, US	Carpet (i)	(South Africa) Cliff Drysdale	5–7, 3–6
Loss	9–14	Nov 1978	Taipei, Taiwan	Carpet (i)	(United States) Brian Teacher	3–6, 3–6, 3–6
Loss	9–15	Mar 1979	San José, Costa Rica	Hard	(South Africa) Bernard Mitton	4–6, 4–6, 3–6

Source: ATP

=== Doubles: 19 (9 titles / 10 runner-ups) ===
Result	W-L	Date	Tournament	Surface	Partner	Opponents	Score
Loss	0–1	Oct 1970	Berkeley, US	Hard	(United States) Roy Barth	(United States) Bob Lutz (United States) Stan Smith	2–6, 5–7, 6–4, 2–6
Win	1–1	May 1971	Paris, France	Clay	(United States) Stan Smith	(France) Pierre Barthès (France) François Jauffret	3–6, 7–5, 6–2
Loss	1–2	Jun 1971	French Open, Paris	Clay	(United States) Stan Smith	(United States) Arthur Ashe (United States) Marty Riessen	6–4, 3–6, 4–6, 9–11
Win	2–2	Nov 1971	Stockholm, Sweden	Hard (i)	(United States) Stan Smith	(United States) Arthur Ashe (United States) Bob Lutz	6–3, 6–4
Win	3–2	Feb 1973	Copenhagen WCT, Denmark	Carpet (i)	(United States) Erik van Dillen	(United Kingdom) Mark Cox (United Kingdom) Graham Stilwell	6–4, 6–4
Loss	3–3	Apr 1973	Vancouver WCT, Canada	Other	(United States) Erik van Dillen	(France) Pierre Barthès (United Kingdom) Roger Taylor	7–5, 3–6, 6–7
Loss	3–4	Apr 1973	Charlotte WCT, US	Clay	(United States) Erik van Dillen	(Netherlands) Tom Okker (United States) Marty Riessen	6–7, 6–3, 3–6
Win	4–4	Jul 1973	Nottingham, UK	Grass	(United States) Erik van Dillen	(Australia) Bob Carmichael (South Africa) Frew McMillan	6–4, 6–1
Loss	4–5	Aug 1973	South Orange, US	Hard	(United States) Pancho Gonzales	(United States) Jimmy Connors (Romania) Ilie Năstase	7–6, 3–6, 2–6
Win	5–5	Sep 1973	Seattle, US	Other	(Netherlands) Tom Okker	(Australia) Bob Carmichael (South Africa) Frew McMillan	2–6, 6–4, 7–6
Win	6–5	Oct 1973	Osaka, Japan	Hard	(United States) Jeff Borowiak	(Japan) Jun Kamiwazumi (Australia) Ken Rosewall	6–4, 7–6
Win	7–5	Jul 1974	Chicago, US	Carpet (i)	(United States) Marty Riessen	(United States) Brian Gottfried (Mexico) Raúl Ramírez	4–6, 6–3, 7–5
Win	8–5	Jul 1974	Washington, D.C., US	Clay	(United States) Marty Riessen	(Chile) Patricio Cornejo (Chile) Jaime Fillol	7–5, 6–1
Loss	8–6	Aug 1974	Columbus, US	Hard	(United States) Bob Lutz	(India) Anand Amritraj (India) Vijay Amritraj	DEF
Loss	8–7	Jan 1976	Indianapolis WCT, US	Carpet (i)	(United States) Vitas Gerulaitis	(United States) Bob Lutz (United States) Stan Smith	2–6, 4–6
Win	9–7	Apr 1976	Sacramento, US	Carpet (i)	(United States) Sherwood Stewart	(United States) Mike Cahill (United States) John Whitlinger	3–6, 6–4, 6–4
Loss	9–8	Feb 1977	San Jose, US	Hard	(Australia) Geoff Masters	(South Africa) Bob Hewitt (South Africa) Frew McMillan	2–6, 3–6
Loss	9–9	Nov 1977	Taipei, Taiwan	Hard	(Australia) Steve Docherty	(United States) Pat DuPré (United States) Chris Delaney	6–7, 6–7
Loss	9–10	Nov 1978	Tokyo Indoor, Japan	Carpet (i)	(United States) Pat DuPré	(Australia) Ross Case (Australia) Geoff Masters	3–6, 4–6

Source: ATP

== Grand Slam performance timeline ==
=== Singles ===
Key
W	F	SF	QF	#R	RR	Q#	DNQ	A	NH

(W) winner; (F) finalist; (SF) semifinalist; (QF) quarterfinalist; (#R) rounds 4, 3, 2, 1; (RR) round-robin stage; (Q#) qualification round; (DNQ) did not qualify; (A) absent; (NH) not held; (SR) strike rate (events won / competed); (W–L) win–loss record.

Tournament	1966	1967	1968	1969	1970	1971	1972	1973	1974	1975	1976	1977		1978	1979	1980	SR
Australian Open	A	A	A	A	2R	A	A	A	A	A	A	2R	1R	A	A	A	0 / 3
French Open	A	A	A	1R	2R	3R	1R	SF	2R	2R	1R	A		A	A	A	0 / 9
Wimbledon	A	A	A	1R	4R	SF	4R	A	4R	1R	2R	1R		3R	1R	1R	0 / 11
US Open	1R	2R	1R	3R	4R	1R	SF	4R	2R	1R	A	A		1R	4R	A	0 / 13
Strike rate	0 / 1	0 / 1	0 / 1	0 / 3	0 / 4	0 / 3	0 / 3	0 / 2	0 / 3	0 / 3	0 / 2	0 / 5		0 / 2	0 / 2	0 / 1	0 / 36

Note: The Australian Open was held twice in 1977, in January and December.

Source: World Tennis
