= Tom Okker =

Dutch tennis player (born 1944)

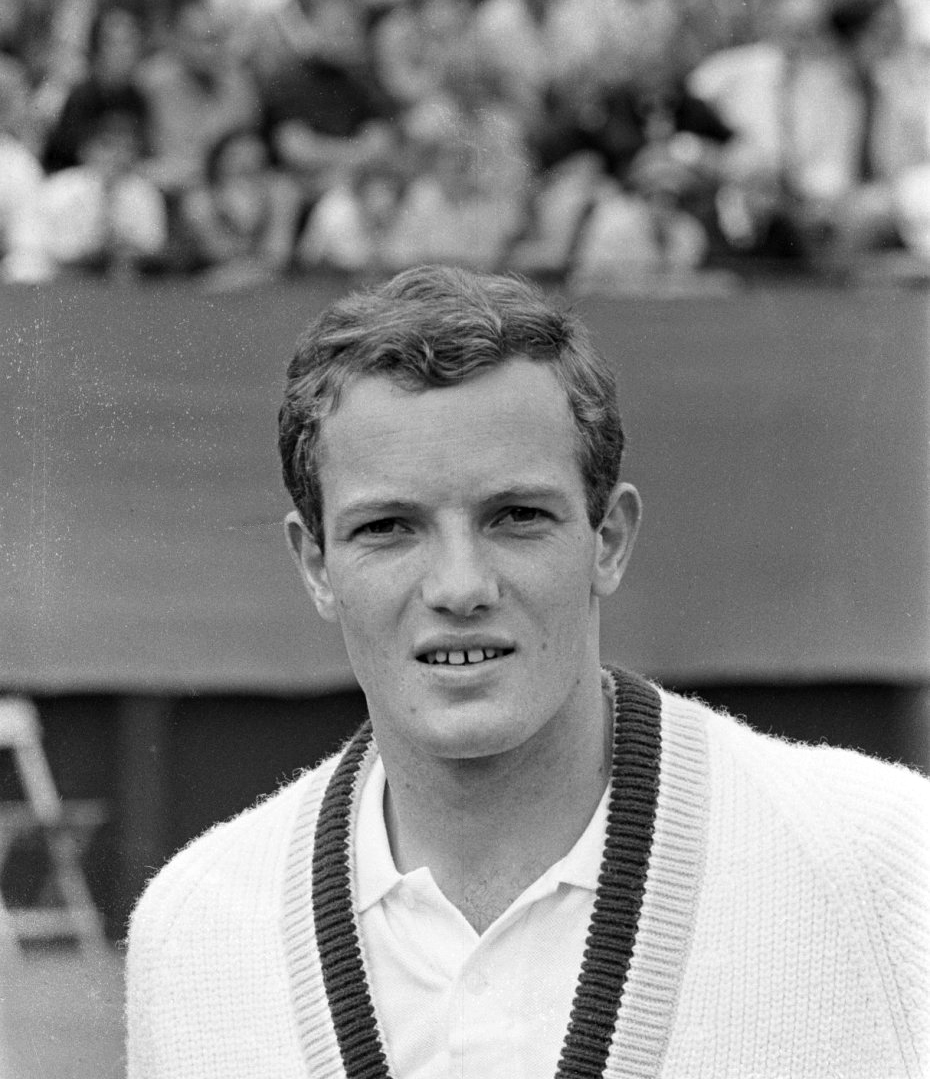
- Full name: Thomas Samuel Okker
- Country (sports): Netherlands
- Residence: Hazerswoude-Dorp, Netherlands
- Born: 22 February 1944 (age 82) Amsterdam, Netherlands
- Height: 1.77 m (5 ft 10 in)
- Turned pro: 1968 (amateur from 1964)
- Retired: 1981
- Plays: Right-handed (one-handed backhand)
- Prize money: $1,257,200

Singles
- Career record: 798–335 in pre Open-Era & Open Era
- Career titles: 40 (35 listed by ATP)
- Highest ranking: No. 3 (2 March 1974)

Grand Slam singles results
- Australian Open: SF (1971)
- French Open: SF (1969)
- Wimbledon: SF (1978)
- US Open: F (1968)

Other tournaments
- Tour Finals: F (1973)
- WCT Finals: SF (1971)

Doubles
- Career record: 550–152
- Career titles: 68
- Highest ranking: No. 1 (5 February 1979)

Grand Slam doubles results
- Australian Open: F (1971)
- French Open: W (1973)
- Wimbledon: F (1969)
- US Open: W (1976)
Medal record
Representing Netherlands
Tennis
Maccabiah Games
Gold medal – first place	1965 Israel	Men's singles
Gold medal – first place	1965 Israel	Mixed doubles

Thomas Samuel Okker (born 22 February 1944), nicknamed "the Flying Dutchman", is a Dutch former tennis player who was active from the mid-1960s until 1980. He won the 1973 French Open Doubles, the 1976 US Open Doubles, and two gold medals at the 1965 Maccabiah Games in Israel. He was ranked among the world's top-ten singles players for seven consecutive years, 1968–74, reaching a career high of world No. 3 in 1974. He also was ranked world No. 1 in doubles in 1979.

== Early life ==
Okker was born in Amsterdam, is Jewish on his father's side, and identifies as Jewish. Okker's father was imprisoned by the Nazis during World War II, but managed to go into hiding by assuming the papers and identity of another man. His grandfather, Simon Okker, was an Olympic fencer who placed fifth at the Athens Olympics (1906). Two weeks after Tom’s birth, his grandfather was murdered in Auschwitz.

== Tennis career ==
He played his first tournament at Wolfsburg, West Germany, on clay in 1963. Okker was the Dutch champion from 1964 through 1968.

In 1968, his first year as a registered professional, he won in singles and in doubles (with Marty Riessen) at the Italian Open. At Wimbledon, Okker reached the quarterfinals in 1968 and the semifinals in 1978. He achieved his best result in a Grand Slam tournament at the 1968 US Open, where he competed as a registered professional player, a professional player allowed to compete for prize money but playing under the control of their national associations and eligible to play in Davis Cup. Okker reached the final after defeating Pancho Gonzales in the quarterfinal and Ken Rosewall in the semifinal. He lost the final to Arthur Ashe in five sets. Okker was awarded the first prize money at the 1968 U.S. Open, as Ashe was still considered an amateur player rather than a registered professional. In February 1969, Okker signed a four-year contract with the Lamar Hunt's World Championship Tennis.

In his career, won 39 singles titles. He also was the runner-up in 39 singles tournaments.

Okker is also among the most successful men's doubles players of all time. He won two Grand Slam doubles titles, at the US Open in 1976 (with Riessen) and the French Open (with John Newcombe) in 1973. In total, Okker won 68 doubles events, a record that was finally broken by Todd Woodbridge in 2005. Okker's other doubles titles include the 1973 Italian Open, 1973 London Grass Courts (with Riessen), 1973 Spanish Open (with Ilie Năstase), 1975 Opel International (with Arthur Ashe), and 1978 WCT World Doubles (with Wojtek Fibak).

One of the first tennis professionals to win at least US$1 million in career prize money, Okker's WTC career earnings stood at $1,257,200 when he retired in 1980 ($4,913,000 today).

=== Davis Cup ===
Between 1964 and 1981, Okker represented the Netherlands in the Davis Cup, playing in 13 ties and accumulating a 15–20 win–loss record.

=== Maccabiah Games ===
In 1965, Okker won both the singles and the mixed doubles titles at the 1965 Maccabiah Games in Israel. This event is open to all Israelis and to non-Israeli Jews.

=== Style of play ===
He was among the first players of his era to hit the ball with heavy topspin.

== Halls of Fame ==
Okker was inducted into the International Jewish Sports Hall of Fame in 2003.

He was nominated for consideration in 2018, but not inducted into the International Tennis Hall of Fame.

== Personal life ==
Okker and his wife Anna-Marie have three children together. Since the mid-1980s Okker has been involved in art and was a founding partner in the Jaski art gallery in Amsterdam, specializing in works of the CoBrA movement. In 2005, he founded art gallery Tom Okker Art bv in Hazerswoude-Dorp, Netherlands, where he now lives.

== Grand Slam finals ==
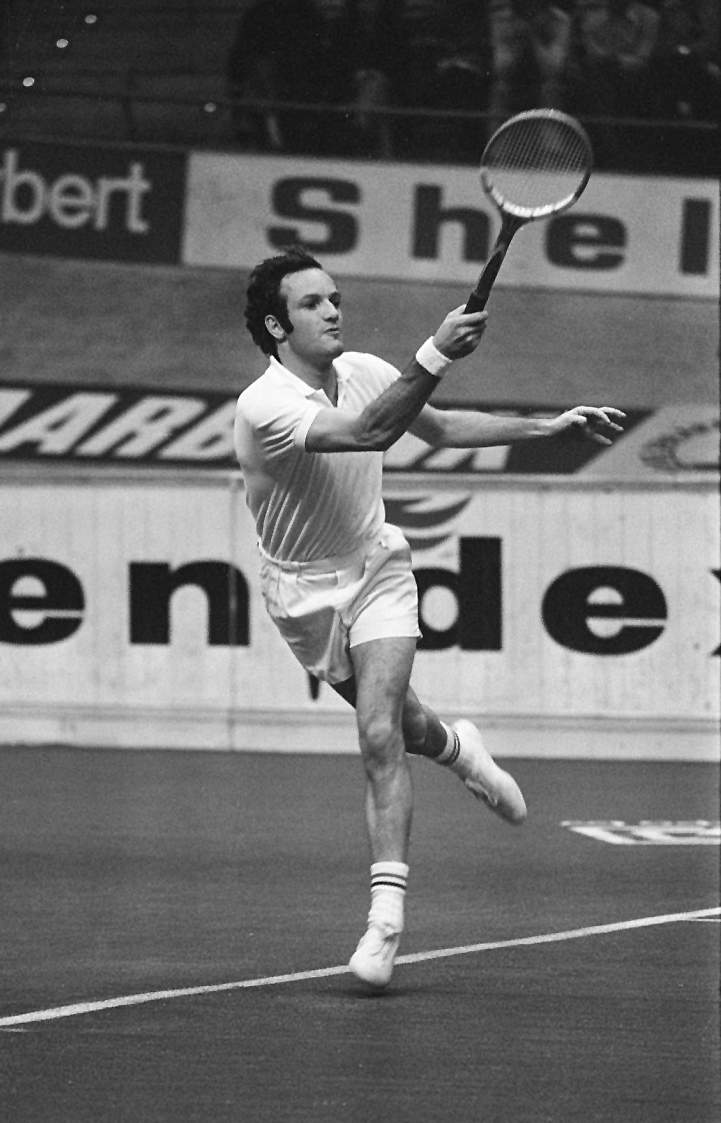
Tom Okker at the 1972 Rotterdam Indoors

=== Singles: 1 (1 runner-up) ===
Result	Year	Championship	Surface	Opponent	Score
Loss	1968	US Open	Grass	(United States) Arthur Ashe	12–14, 7–5, 3–6, 6–3, 3–6

=== Doubles: 5 (2 titles, 3 runner-ups) ===
Result	Year	Championship	Surface	Partner	Opponents	Score
Loss	1969	Wimbledon	Grass	(United States) Marty Riessen	(Australia) John Newcombe (Australia) Tony Roche	5–7, 9–11, 3–6
Loss	1971	Australian Open	Grass	(United States) Marty Riessen	(Australia) John Newcombe (Australia) Tony Roche	2–6, 6–7
Win	1973	French Open	Clay	(Australia) John Newcombe	(United States) Jimmy Connors (Romania) Ilie Năstase	6–1, 3–6, 6–3, 5–7, 6–4
Loss	1975	US Open	Grass	(United States) Marty Riessen	(United States) Jimmy Connors (Romania) Ilie Năstase	4–6, 6–7
Win	1976	US Open	Grass	(United States) Marty Riessen	(Australia) Paul Kronk (Australia) Cliff Letcher	6–4, 6–4

== Career finals ==
=== Singles: 79 (41 titles, 38 runner-ups) ===
Result	W-L	Date	Tournament	Surface	Opponent	Score
Win	1.	Jun 1965	Manchester, UK	Grass	(United Kingdom) Roger Taylor	7–5, 6–3
Loss	1.	Jul 1965	Hilversum, Netherlands	Clay	(Australia) John Newcombe	6–2, 3–6, 6–1, 6–3
Loss	2.	Apr 1966	Bournemouth, UK	Clay	(Australia) Ken Fletcher	5–7, 4–6
Win	1.	Jul 1966	Hilversum, Netherlands	Clay	(Australia) Bob Hewitt	6–3, 6–3, 2–6, 6–3
Win	2.	Feb 1967	Paris, France	Wood (i)	(Czechoslovakia) Jan Kodeš	6–2, 3–6, 6–3, 6–4
Win	2.	Feb 1967	Brussels, Belgium	(i)	(Australia) Jim Moore	6–2, 6–1, 6–0
Loss	3.	May 1967	Brussels, Belgium	Clay	(Australia) Roy Emerson	6–3, 3–6, 7–5, 6–4
Win	3.	Jun 1967	Bristol, UK	Grass	(South Africa) Cliff Drysdale	6–2, 5–7, 8–6
Loss	4.	Nov 1967	Porto Alegre, Brazil	Clay	(United States) Cliff Richey	4–6, 6–3, 3–6, 6–8
Loss	5.	Nov 1967	Rio de Janeiro, Brazil	Clay	(Brazil) Thomaz Koch	4–6, 9–11, 6–3, 3–6
Win	4.	Dec 1967	East London, South Africa	Clay	(United Kingdom) Mark Cox	9–7, 7–5
Loss	6.	Jan 1968	Bloemfontein, South Africa	Hard	(United States) Marty Riessen	5–7, 3–6
Win	5.	Mar 1968	Kingston, Jamaica	Hard (i)	(Spain) Manuel Orantes	6–2, 6–4
Win	6.	Mar 1968	Barranquilla, Colombia	Clay	(United States) Marty Riessen	8–6, 6–3, 6–3
Loss	8.	Mar 1968	Willemstad, Curaçao	Clay	(United States) Marty Riessen	5–7, 6–3, 11–9, 2–6, 2–6
Win	7.	Apr 1968	Johannesburg, South Africa	Hard	(United States) Marty Riessen	12–10, 6–1, 6–4
↓ Open era ↓
Win	8.	May 1968	Rome, Italy	Clay	(South Africa) Bob Hewitt	10–8, 6–8, 6–1, 1–6, 6–0
Loss	9.	Jun 1968	West Berlin, Germany	Clay	(Spain) Manuel Santana	8–6, 4–6, 1–6, 2–6
Win	9.	Jun 1968	Saltsjöbaden, Sweden	Clay	(Sweden) Jan-Erik Lundqvist	6–3, 3–6, 5–7
Loss	10.	Jun 1968	Lugano, Switzerland	Clay	(Romania) Ion Țiriac	8–6, 5–7, 0–6
Loss	11.	Jun 1968	London, UK	Grass	(United States) Clark Graebner	final rained out
Win	10.	Jul 1968	Dublin, Ireland	Grass	(Australia) Lew Hoad	6–1, 6–2
Loss	12.	Jul 1968	Gstaad, Switzerland	Clay	(South Africa) Cliff Drysdale	3–6, 3–6, 0–6
Loss	13.	Sep 1968	US Open, New York	Grass	(United States) Arthur Ashe	12–14, 7–5, 3–6, 6–3, 3–6
Loss	14.	Apr 1969	Johannesburg, South Africa	Hard	(Australia) Rod Laver	3–6, 8–10, 3–6
Win	11.	Apr 1969	Monte Carlo, Monaco	Clay	(Australia) John Newcombe	8–10, 6–1, 7–5, 6–3
Win	12.	May 1969	Tokyo, Japan	Hard (i)	(Australia) Roy Emerson	5–7, 6–2, 7–5
Win	13.	May 1969	Brussels, Belgium	Clay	(Socialist Federal Republic of Yugoslavia) Željko Franulović	6–4, 1–6, 6–2, 6–3
Win	14.	May 1969	Amsterdam, Netherlands	Clay	(Spain) Andrés Gimeno	Round robin
Win	15.	Jul 1969	Milwaukee, US	Clay	(United States) Marty Riessen	Round robin
Loss	15.	Jul 1969	Gstaad, Switzerland	Clay	(Australia) Roy Emerson	1–6, 14–12, 4–6, 4–6
Win	16.	Aug 1969	Hilversum, Netherlands	Hard	(United Kingdom) Roger Taylor	10–8, 7–9, 6–4, 6–4
Loss	16.	Aug 1969	Hamburg, Germany	Clay	(Australia) Tony Roche	1–6, 7–5, 5–7, 6–8
Win	17.	Aug 1969	Newport, US	Grass	(United States) Dennis Ralston	4–6, 6–5, 6–1
Loss	17.	Oct 1969	Tucson, US	Hard	(Australia) Tony Roche	6–9, 1–6
Loss	18.	Nov 1969	Casablanca, Morocco	Clay	(Australia) Tony Roche	Round robin
Win	18.	Nov 1969	Paris Masters, France	Carpet (i)	(United States) Butch Buchholz	8–6, 6–2, 6–1
Loss	19.	Jan 1970	Auckland, New Zealand	Grass	(United Kingdom) Roger Taylor	4–6, 4–6, 1–6
Win	19.	May 1970	Brussels, Belgium	Clay	(Romania) Ilie Năstase	6–3, 6–4, 0–6, 4–6, 6–4
Win	20.	May 1970	Atlanta WCT, US	Hard	(United States) Dennis Ralston	6–4, 10–8, 6–2
Loss	20.	Jul 1970	Gstaad, Switzerland	Clay	(Australia) Tony Roche	5–7, 5–7, 3–6
Win	21.	Jul 1970	Leicester, UK	Grass	(United Kingdom) Roger Taylor	6–1, 10–8
Win	22.	Aug 1970	Hilversum, Netherlands	Hard	(United Kingdom) Roger Taylor	4–6, 6–0, 6–1, 6–3
Win	23.	Aug 1970	Hamburg, Germany	Clay	(Romania) Ilie Năstase	4–6, 6–3, 6–3, 6–4
Loss	21.	Oct 1970	West Berlin, Germany	Clay	(Australia) Rod Laver	Round robin
Loss	22.	Mar 1971	New York, US	Hard (i)	(Australia) Rod Laver	5–7, 2–6, 1–6
Loss	23.	Apr 1971	Monte Carlo, Monaco	Clay	(Romania) Ilie Năstase	6–3, 6–8, 1–6, 1–6
Loss	24.	Jul 1971	Gstaad, Switzerland	Clay	(Australia) John Newcombe	2–6, 7–5, 6–1, 5–7, 3–6
Win	24.	Jul 1971	Louisville WCT, US	Clay	(South Africa) Cliff Drysdale	3–6, 6–4, 6–1
Win	25.	Aug 1971	Quebec WCT, Canada	Indoor	(Australia) Rod Laver	6–3, 7–6, 6–7, 6–4
Loss	25.	Aug 1971	Toronto, Canada	Clay	(Australia) John Newcombe	6–7, 6–3, 2–6, 6–7
Loss	26.	Oct 1971	Vancouver WCT, Canada	Hard (i)	(Australia) Ken Rosewall	2–6, 2–6, 4–6
Win	26.	Mar 1972	Chicago WCT, US	Carpet (i)	(United States) Arthur Ashe	4–6, 6–2, 6–3
Loss	27.	Aug 1972	Boston WCT, US	Hard	(United States) Bob Lutz	4–6, 6–2, 4–6, 4–6
Loss	28.	Nov 1972	Stockholm, Sweden	Hard (i)	(United States) Stan Smith	4–6, 3–6
Loss	29.	Nov 1972	Rotterdam WCT, Netherlands	Carpet (i)	(United States) Arthur Ashe	6–3, 2–6, 1–6
Win	27.	Mar 1973	Washington WCT, US	Carpet (i)	(United States) Arthur Ashe	6–3, 6–7, 7–6
Win	28.	Jul 1973	Hilversum, Netherlands	Clay	(Spain) Andrés Gimeno	2–6, 6–4, 6–4, 6–7, 6–3
Loss	30.	Jul 1973	Washington, D.C., US	Clay	(United States) Arthur Ashe	4–6, 2–6
Win	29.	Aug 1973	Toronto, Canada	Clay	(Spain) Manuel Orantes	6–3, 6–2, 6–1
Win	30.	Sep 1973	Seattle, US	Hard (i)	(Australia) John Alexander	7–5, 6–4
Loss	31.	Sep 1973	Los Angeles, US	Hard	(United States) Jimmy Connors	5–7, 6–7
Win	31.	Sep 1973	Chicago, US	Carpet (i)	(Australia) John Newcombe	3–6, 7–6, 6–3
Win	32.	Oct 1973	Madrid, Spain	Clay	(Chile) Jaime Fillol	4–6, 6–3, 6–3, 7–5
Win	33.	Nov 1973	London, UK	Carpet (i)	(Romania) Ilie Năstase	6–3, 6–4
Loss	32.	Dec 1973	Masters, Boston	Carpet (i)	(Romania) Ilie Năstase	3–6, 5–7, 6–4, 3–6
Win	34.	Feb 1974	Toronto WCT, Canada	Carpet (i)	(Romania) Ilie Năstase	6–3, 6–4
Loss	33.	Mar 1974	Washington WCT, US	Carpet (i)	(Romania) Ilie Năstase	3–6, 3–6
Win	35.	Mar 1974	Rotterdam, Netherlands	Carpet (i)	(United States) Tom Gorman	4–6, 7–6, 6–1
Loss	34.	Aug 1974	Boston, US	Clay	(Sweden) Björn Borg	6–7, 1–6, 1–6
Loss	35.	Nov 1974	Stockholm, Sweden	Hard (i)	(United States) Arthur Ashe	2–6, 2–6
Loss	36.	Mar 1975	Rotterdam WCT, Netherlands	Carpet (i)	(United States) Arthur Ashe	6–3, 2–6, 4–6
Loss	37.	Apr 1975	Johannesburg WCT, South Africa	Hard	(United Kingdom) Buster Mottram	4–6, 2–6
Loss	38.	Apr 1975	Stockholm WCT, Sweden	Carpet (i)	(United States) Arthur Ashe	4–6, 2–6
Win	36.	Jun 1975	Nottingham, UK	Grass	(Australia) Tony Roche	6–1, 3–6, 6–3
Win	37.	Nov 1975	Paris Masters, France	Hard (i)	(United States) Arthur Ashe	6–3, 2–6, 6–3, 3–6, 6–4
Win	38.	Feb 1977	Richmond WCT, US	Carpet (i)	(United States) Vitas Gerulaitis	3–6, 6–3, 6–4
Loss	39.	Jul 1978	Hilversum, Netherlands	Clay	(Hungary) Balázs Taróczy	6–2, 1–6, 2–6, 4–6
Win	39.	Oct 1979	Tel Aviv, Israel	Hard	(Sweden) Per Hjertquist	6–4, 6–3

=== Doubles: 104 (68 titles, 36 runner-ups) ===
Result	W-L	Date	Tournament	Surface	Partner	Opponents	Score
Win	1.	1968	Rome, Italy	Clay	(United States) Marty Riessen	(Greece) Nicholas Kalogeropoulos (Australia) Allan Stone	6–3, 6–4, 6–2
Loss	1.	1968	Gstaad, Switzerland	Clay	(Australia) Mal Anderson	(Australia) John Newcombe (United States) Dennis Ralston	10–8, 10–12, 14–12, 3–6, 3–6
Win	2.	1968	Hamburg, Germany	Clay	(United States) Marty Riessen	(Australia) John Newcombe (Australia) Tony Roche	6–4, 6–4, 7–5
Win	3.	1969	Philadelphia, US	Carpet (i)	(United States) Marty Riessen	(Australia) John Newcombe (Australia) Tony Roche	8–6, 6–4
Loss	2.	1969	Wimbledon, London	Grass	(United States) Marty Riessen	(Australia) John Newcombe (Australia) Tony Roche	5–7, 9–11, 3–6
Win	4.	1969	Gstaad, Switzerland	Clay	(United States) Marty Riessen	(Australia) Mal Anderson (Australia) Roy Emerson	6–1, 6–4
Win	5.	1969	Hamburg, Germany	Clay	(United States) Marty Riessen	(France) Jean-Claude Barclay (West Germany) Jürgen Fassbender	6–1, 6–2, 6–4
Win	6.	1970	London Queen's Club, England	Grass	(United States) Marty Riessen	(United States) Arthur Ashe (United States) Charlie Pasarell	6–4, 6–4
Loss	3.	1970	Gstaad, Switzerland	Clay	(United States) Marty Riessen	(South Africa) Cliff Drysdale (United Kingdom) Roger Taylor	2–6, 3–6, 2–6
Loss	4.	1970	Hamburg, Germany	Clay	(Socialist Federal Republic of Yugoslavia) Nikola Pilić	(South Africa) Bob Hewitt (South Africa) Frew McMillan	3–6, 5–7, 2–6
Win	7.	1970	Los Angeles, US	Hard	(United States) Marty Riessen	(United States) Bob Lutz (United States) Stan Smith	7–6, 6–2
Loss	5.	1971	Australian Open, Sydney	Grass	(United States) Marty Riessen	(Australia) John Newcombe (Australia) Tony Roche	2–6, 6–7
Loss	6.	1971	Monte Carlo, Monaco	Clay	(United Kingdom) Roger Taylor	(Romania) Ilie Năstase (Romania) Ion Țiriac	6–1, 3–6, 3–6, 6–8
Win	8.	1971	Chicago WCT, US	Carpet (i)	(United States) Marty Riessen	(Australia) John Newcombe (Australia) Tony Roche	7–6, 4–6, 7–6
Win	9.	1971	Dallas WCT, US	Carpet (i)	(United States) Marty Riessen	(United States) Bob Lutz (United States) Charlie Pasarell	6–3, 6–4
Win	10.	1971	London Queen's Club, England	Grass	(United States) Marty Riessen	(United States) Erik van Dillen (United States) Stan Smith	8–6, 4–6, 10–8
Loss	7.	1971	Gstaad, Switzerland	Clay	(Australia) John Newcombe	(Australia) John Alexander (Australia) Phil Dent	7–5, 3–6, 4–6
Win	11.	1971	Washington, D.C., US	Clay	(United States) Marty Riessen	(Australia) Bob Carmichael (Australia) Ray Ruffels	7–6, 6–2
Loss	8.	1971	Quebec WCT, Canada	Indoor	(United States) Marty Riessen	(Australia) Roy Emerson (Australia) Rod Laver	6–7, 2–6
Loss	9.	1971	Boston WCT, US	Clay	(United States) Marty Riessen	(Australia) Roy Emerson (Australia) Rod Laver	4–6, 4–6
Win	12.	1971	Montreal, Canada	Clay	(United States) Marty Riessen	(United States) Arthur Ashe (United States) Dennis Ralston	6–3, 6–3, 6–1
Win	13.	1971	Cologne, Germany	Carpet (i)	(United States) Marty Riessen	(Australia) Roy Emerson (Australia) Rod Laver	6–7, 3–6, 7–6, 6–3, 6–4
Win	14.	1972	Richmond WCT, US	Carpet (i)	(United States) Marty Riessen	(Australia) John Newcombe (Australia) Tony Roche	7–6, 7–6
Win	15.	1972	Miami WCT, US	Hard	(United States) Marty Riessen	(Australia) Roy Emerson (Australia) Rod Laver	7–5, 6–4
Win	16.	1972	Chicago WCT, US	Carpet (i)	(United States) Marty Riessen	(Australia) Roy Emerson (Australia) Rod Laver	6–2, 6–3
Win	17.	1972	Charlotte WCT, US	Clay	(United States) Marty Riessen	(Australia) John Newcombe (Australia) Tony Roche	6–4, 4–6, 7–6
Win	18.	1972	Washington, D.C.., US	Clay	(United States) Marty Riessen	(Australia) John Newcombe (Australia) Tony Roche	3–6, 6–3, 6–2
Win	19.	1972	Fort Worth WCT, US	Hard	(United States) Marty Riessen	(Australia) Ken Rosewall (Australia) Fred Stolle	6–2, 6–2
Win	20.	Sep 1972	Montreal WCT, Canada	Hard	(United States) Marty Riessen	(South Africa) Robert Maud (Australia) Ken Rosewall	6–1, 4–6, 7–6
Win	21.	1972	Alamo WCT, US	Outdoor	(United States) Marty Riessen	(New Zealand) Brian Fairlie (Egypt) Ismail El Shafei	7–6, 6–4
Win	22.	1972	Stockholm, Sweden	Hard (i)	(United States) Marty Riessen	(Australia) Colin Dibley (Australia) Roy Emerson	7–5, 7–6
Win	23.	1972	Gothenburg WCT, Sweden	Carpet (i)	(United States) Marty Riessen	(New Zealand) Brian Fairlie (Egypt) Ismail El Shafei	6–2, 7–6
Win	24.	1973	London WCT, England	Hard (i)	(United States) Marty Riessen	(United States) Arthur Ashe (United States) Roscoe Tanner	6–3, 6–3
Win	25.	1973	Milan WCT, Italy	Carpet (i)	(United States) Marty Riessen	(Australia) Ken Rosewall (Australia) Fred Stolle	6–3, 6–3
Loss	10.	1973	Cologne WCT, Germany	Carpet (i)	(United States) Marty Riessen	(United Kingdom) Mark Cox (United Kingdom) Graham Stilwell	6–7, 3–6
Win	26.	1973	Washington WCT, US	Carpet (i)	(United States) Marty Riessen	(United States) Arthur Ashe (United States) Roscoe Tanner	4–6, 7–6, 6–2
Win	27.	1973	Houston, US	Clay	(United States) Marty Riessen	(United States) Arthur Ashe (United States) Roscoe Tanner	7–5, 7–5
Win	28.	1973	Charlotte WCT, US	Clay	(United States) Marty Riessen	(United States) Erik van Dillen (United States) Tom Gorman	7–6, 3–6, 6–3
Loss	11.	1973	Denver WCT, US	Carpet (i)	(United States) Marty Riessen	(United States) Arthur Ashe (United States) Roscoe Tanner	6–3, 3–6, 6–7
Loss	12.	1973	World Doubles WCT, Montreal	Carpet (i)	(United States) Marty Riessen	(United States) Bob Lutz (United States) Stan Smith	2–6, 6–7, 0–6
Win	29.	1973	French Open, Paris	Clay	(Australia) John Newcombe	(United States) Jimmy Connors (Romania) Ilie Năstase	6–1, 3–6, 6–3, 5–7, 6–4
Win	30.	1973	Rome, Italy	Clay	(Australia) John Newcombe	(Australia) Ross Case (Australia) Geoff Masters	6–2, 6–3, 6–4
Win	31.	1973	London Queen's Club, England	Grass	(United States) Marty Riessen	(Australia) Ray Keldie (South Africa) Raymond Moore	6–4, 7–5
Win	32.	1973	Seattle, US	Hard	(United States) Tom Gorman	(Australia) Bob Carmichael (South Africa) Frew McMillan	2–6, 6–4, 7–6
Win	33.	1973	Barcelona, Spain	Clay	(Romania) Ilie Năstase	(Spain) Antonio Muñoz (Spain) Manuel Orantes	4–6, 6–3, 6–2
Win	34.	1973	Madrid, Spain	Clay	(Romania) Ilie Năstase	(Australia) Bob Carmichael (South Africa) Frew McMillan	6–3, 6–0
Win	35.	1973	Johannesburg, South Africa	Hard	(United States) Arthur Ashe	(Australia) Lew Hoad (South Africa) Robert Maud	6–2, 4–6, 6–2, 6–4
Loss	13.	1974	Toronto WCT, Canada	Carpet (i)	(United States) Marty Riessen	(Mexico) Raúl Ramírez (Australia) Tony Roche	3–6, 6–2, 4–6
Loss	14.	1974	Miami WCT, US	Hard	(United States) Marty Riessen	(Australia) John Alexander (Australia) Phil Dent	6–4, 4–6, 5–7
Loss	15.	1974	Washington WCT, US	Carpet (i)	(United States) Marty Riessen	(South Africa) Bob Hewitt (South Africa) Frew McMillan	6–7, 3–6
Win	36.	1974	Stockholm, Sweden	Hard (i)	(United States) Marty Riessen	(South Africa) Bob Hewitt (South Africa) Frew McMillan	2–6, 6–3, 6–4
Loss	16.	1974	Johannesburg, South Africa	Hard	(United States) Marty Riessen	(South Africa) Bob Hewitt (South Africa) Frew McMillan	6–7, 4–6, 3–6
Loss	17.	1975	Bologna WCT, Italy	Carpet (i)	(United States) Arthur Ashe	(Italy) Paolo Bertolucci (Italy) Adriano Panatta	3–6, 6–3, 3–6
Win	37.	1975	Barcelona WCT, Spain	Carpet (i)	(United States) Arthur Ashe	(Italy) Paolo Bertolucci (Italy) Adriano Panatta	7–5, 6–1
Loss	18.	1975	Monte Carlo WCT, Monaco	Clay	(United States) Arthur Ashe	(South Africa) Bob Hewitt (South Africa) Frew McMillan	3–6, 2–6
Win	38.	1975	Johannesburg WCT, South Africa	Hard	(United States) Arthur Ashe	(South Africa) Bob Hewitt (South Africa) Frew McMillan	6–3, 6–2
Win	39.	1975	Stockholm WCT, Sweden	Carpet (i)	(United States) Arthur Ashe	(France) Patrice Dominguez (Australia) Kim Warwick	6–3, 7–6
Loss	19.	1975	Nottingham, England	Grass	(United States) Marty Riessen	(United States) Charlie Pasarell (United States) Roscoe Tanner	2–6, 3–6
Loss	20.	1975	US Open, New York	Clay	(United States) Marty Riessen	(United States) Jimmy Connors (Romania) Ilie Năstase	4–6, 6–7
Loss	21.	1975	Paris Masters, France	Hard (i)	(Romania) Ilie Năstase	(Poland) Wojciech Fibak (West Germany) Karl Meiler	4–6, 6–7
Win	40.	Nov 1975	Hong Kong	Hard	(Australia) Ken Rosewall	(Australia) Bob Carmichael (United States) Sandy Mayer	6–3, 6–4
Loss	22.	1976	Columbus WCT, US	Carpet (i)	(United States) Arthur Ashe	(South Africa) Bob Hewitt (South Africa) Frew McMillan	6–7, 4–6
Loss	23.	1976	Richmond WCT, US	Carpet (i)	(United States) Arthur Ashe	(United States) Brian Gottfried (Mexico) Raúl Ramírez	4–6, 5–7
Loss	24.	1976	Rotterdam WCT, Netherlands	Carpet (i)	(United States) Arthur Ashe	(Australia) Rod Laver (South Africa) Frew McMillan	1–6, 7–6, 6–7
Win	41.	1976	Basel, Switzerland	Carpet (i)	(South Africa) Frew McMillan	(Czechoslovakia) Jiří Hřebec (Czechoslovakia) Jan Kodeš	6–4, 7–6, 6–4
Loss	25.	1976	Johannesburg WCT, South Africa	Hard	(South Africa) Frew McMillan	(United States) Marty Riessen (United States) Roscoe Tanner	2–6, 5–7
Loss	26.	1976	Stockholm WCT, Sweden	Carpet (i)	(Italy) Adriano Panatta	(Soviet Union) Alex Metreveli (Romania) Ilie Năstase	4–6, 5–7
Win	42.	1976	US Open, New York	Clay	(United States) Marty Riessen	(Australia) Paul Kronk (Australia) Cliff Letcher	6–4, 6–4
Win	43.	1976	Paris Masters, France	Hard (i)	(United States) Marty Riessen	(United States) Fred McNair (United States) Sherwood Stewart	6–2, 6–2
Loss	27.	1976	Stockholm, Sweden	Hard (i)	(United States) Marty Riessen	(South Africa) Bob Hewitt (South Africa) Frew McMillan	4–6, 6–4, 4–6
Win	44.	1977	Birmingham WCT, US	Carpet (i)	(Poland) Wojciech Fibak	(United States) Billy Martin (United States) Bill Scanlon	6–3, 6–4
Loss	28.	1977	Philadelphia WCT, US	Carpet (i)	(Poland) Wojciech Fibak	(South Africa) Bob Hewitt (South Africa) Frew McMillan	1–6, 6–1, 3–6
Win	45.	1977	Richmond WCT, US	Carpet (i)	(Poland) Wojciech Fibak	(Australia) Ross Case (Australia) Tony Roche	6–4, 6–4
Win	46.	1977	Mexico City WCT, Mexico	Hard	(Poland) Wojciech Fibak	(Romania) Ilie Năstase (Italy) Adriano Panatta	6–2, 6–3
Win	47.	1977	Toronto Indoor WCT, Canada	Carpet (i)	(Poland) Wojciech Fibak	(Australia) Ross Case (Australia) Tony Roche	6–4, 6–1
Win	48.	1977	Rotterdam, Netherlands	Carpet (i)	(Poland) Wojciech Fibak	(India) Vijay Amritraj (United States) Dick Stockton	6–4, 6–4
Loss	29.	1977	Monte Carlo WCT, Monaco	Clay	(Poland) Wojciech Fibak	(France) François Jauffret (Czechoslovakia) Jan Kodeš	6–2, 3–6, 2–6
Win	49.	Apr 1977	Charlotte WCT, US	Carpet (i)	(Australia) Ken Rosewall	(Italy) Corrado Barazzutti (Italy) Adriano Panatta	6–1, 3–6, 7–6
Win	50.	1977	Woodlands Doubles, US	Hard	(United States) Marty Riessen	(United States) Tim Gullikson (United States) Tom Gullikson	3–6, 6–3, 6–3, 4–6, 6–1
Win	51.	1977	Stockholm, Sweden	Hard (i)	(Poland) Wojciech Fibak	(United States) Brian Gottfried (Mexico) Raúl Ramírez	6–3, 6–3
Loss	30.	1978	St. Louis WCT, US	Carpet	(Poland) Wojciech Fibak	(South Africa) Bob Hewitt (South Africa) Frew McMillan	3–6, 2–6
Win	52.	1978	Houston WCT, US	Clay	(Poland) Wojciech Fibak	(United States) Tom Leonard (United States) Mike Machette	7–5, 7–5
Win	53.	1978	World Doubles WCT, US	Carpet (i)	(Poland) Wojciech Fibak	(United States) Bob Lutz (United States) Stan Smith	6–7, 6–4, 6–0, 6–3
Win	54.	1978	Hamburg, Germany	Clay	(Poland) Wojciech Fibak	(Spain) Antonio Muñoz (Paraguay) Víctor Pecci	6–2, 6–4
Loss	31.	1978	Munich, Germany	Clay	(West Germany) Jürgen Fassbender	(Romania) Ion Țiriac (Argentina) Guillermo Vilas	6–3, 4–6, 6–7
Win	55.	1978	Gstaad, Switzerland	Clay	(Australia) Mark Edmondson	(South Africa) Bob Hewitt (Australia) Kim Warwick	6–4, 1–6, 6–1, 6–4
Win	56.	1978	Hilversum, Netherlands	Clay	(Hungary) Balázs Taróczy	(Australia) Bob Carmichael (Australia) Mark Edmondson	7–6, 4–6, 7–5
Win	57.	1978	Toronto, Canada	Clay	(Poland) Wojciech Fibak	(Switzerland) Colin Dowdeswell (Switzerland) Heinz Günthardt	6–3, 7–6
Win	58.	1978	Woodlands Doubles, US	Hard	(Poland) Wojciech Fibak	(United States) Marty Riessen (United States) Sherwood Stewart	7–6, 3–6, 4–6, 7–6, 6–3
Win	59.	1978	Stockholm, Sweden	Hard (i)	(Poland) Wojciech Fibak	(United States) Bob Lutz (United States) Stan Smith	6–3, 6–2
Loss	32.	1979	Birmingham, US	Carpet (i)	(Romania) Ilie Năstase	(United States) Stan Smith (United States) Dick Stockton	2–6, 3–6
Win	60.	1979	Philadelphia, US	Carpet (i)	(Poland) Wojciech Fibak	(United States) Peter Fleming (United States) John McEnroe	5–7, 6–1, 6–3
Loss	33.	1979	Denver, US	Carpet (i)	(Poland) Wojciech Fibak	(United States) Bob Lutz (United States) Stan Smith	6–7, 3–6
Win	61.	1979	Memphis, US	Carpet (i)	(Poland) Wojciech Fibak	(South Africa) Frew McMillan (United States) Dick Stockton	6–4, 6–4
Win	62.	1979	Stuttgart Indoor, Germany	Hard (i)	(Poland) Wojciech Fibak	(Australia) Bob Carmichael (United States) Brian Teacher	6–3, 5–7, 7–6
Win	63.	1979	Munich, Germany	Clay	(Poland) Wojciech Fibak	(West Germany) Jürgen Fassbender (France) Jean-Louis Haillet	7–6, 7–5
Win	64.	1979	Hilversum, Netherlands	Clay	(Hungary) Balázs Taróczy	(Czechoslovakia) Jan Kodeš (Czechoslovakia) Tomáš Šmíd	6–1, 6–3
Win	65.	1979	Tel Aviv, Israel	Hard	(Romania) Ilie Năstase	(United States) Mike Cahill (Australia) Colin Dibley	7–5, 6–4
Loss	34.	1979	Stockholm, Sweden	Hard (i)	(Poland) Wojciech Fibak	(United States) Peter Fleming (United States) John McEnroe	4–6, 4–6
Loss	35.	1980	Masters Doubles WCT, London	Carpet (i)	(Poland) Wojciech Fibak	(United States) Brian Gottfried (Mexico) Raúl Ramírez	6–3, 4–6, 4–6, 6–3, 3–6
Win	66.	1980	Birmingham, US	Carpet (i)	(Poland) Wojciech Fibak	(Argentina) José Luis Clerc (Romania) Ilie Năstase	6–3, 6–3
Win	67.	1980	Cairo, Egypt	Clay	(Egypt) Ismail El Shafei	(France) Christophe Freyss (France) Bernard Fritz	6–3, 3–6, 6–3
Win	68.	1980	Hilversum, Netherlands	Clay	(Hungary) Balázs Taróczy	(United States) Tony Giammalva (United Kingdom) Buster Mottram	7–5, 6–3, 7–6
Loss	36.	1980	Bangkok, Thailand	Carpet (i)	(United States) Dick Stockton	(United States) Ferdi Taygan (United States) Brian Teacher	6–7, 6–7

== Grand Slam singles performance timeline ==
Key
W	F	SF	QF	#R	RR	Q#	DNQ	A	NH

(W) winner; (F) finalist; (SF) semifinalist; (QF) quarterfinalist; (#R) rounds 4, 3, 2, 1; (RR) round-robin stage; (Q#) qualification round; (DNQ) did not qualify; (A) absent; (NH) not held; (SR) strike rate (events won / competed); (W–L) win–loss record.

Tournament	1964	1965	1966	1967	1968	1969	1970	1971	1972	1973	1974	1975	1976	1977	1978	1979	1980	1981	SR
Australian Open	A	2R	3R	A	A	1R	QF	SF	A	A	A	A	A	A	A	A	A	A	0 / 5
French Open	A	2R	4R	QF	A	SF	A	A	A	QF	A	A	A	A	1R	A	A	A	0 / 6
Wimbledon	2R	1R	4R	2R	QF	QF	2R	4R	A	A	4R	QF	3R	4R	SF	QF	3R	1R	0 / 16
US Open	1R	A	A	A	F	1R	4R	SF	3R	4R	4R	2R	3R	A	1R	1R	1R	A	0 / 13
Grand Slam SR	0 / 2	0 / 3	0 / 3	0 / 2	0 / 2	0 / 4	0 / 3	0 / 3	0 / 1	0 / 2	0 / 2	0 / 2	0 / 2	0 / 1	0 / 3	0 / 2	0 / 2	0 / 1	0 / 40
Year-end ranking	N/A									4	6	11	23	31	50	56	107	N/A	

== See also ==
- List of select Jewish tennis players

Awards
Preceded by Jan Janssen	Dutch Sportsman of the Year; 1969	Succeeded by Ard Schenk
