= Bob Carmichael =

Australian tennis player and coach

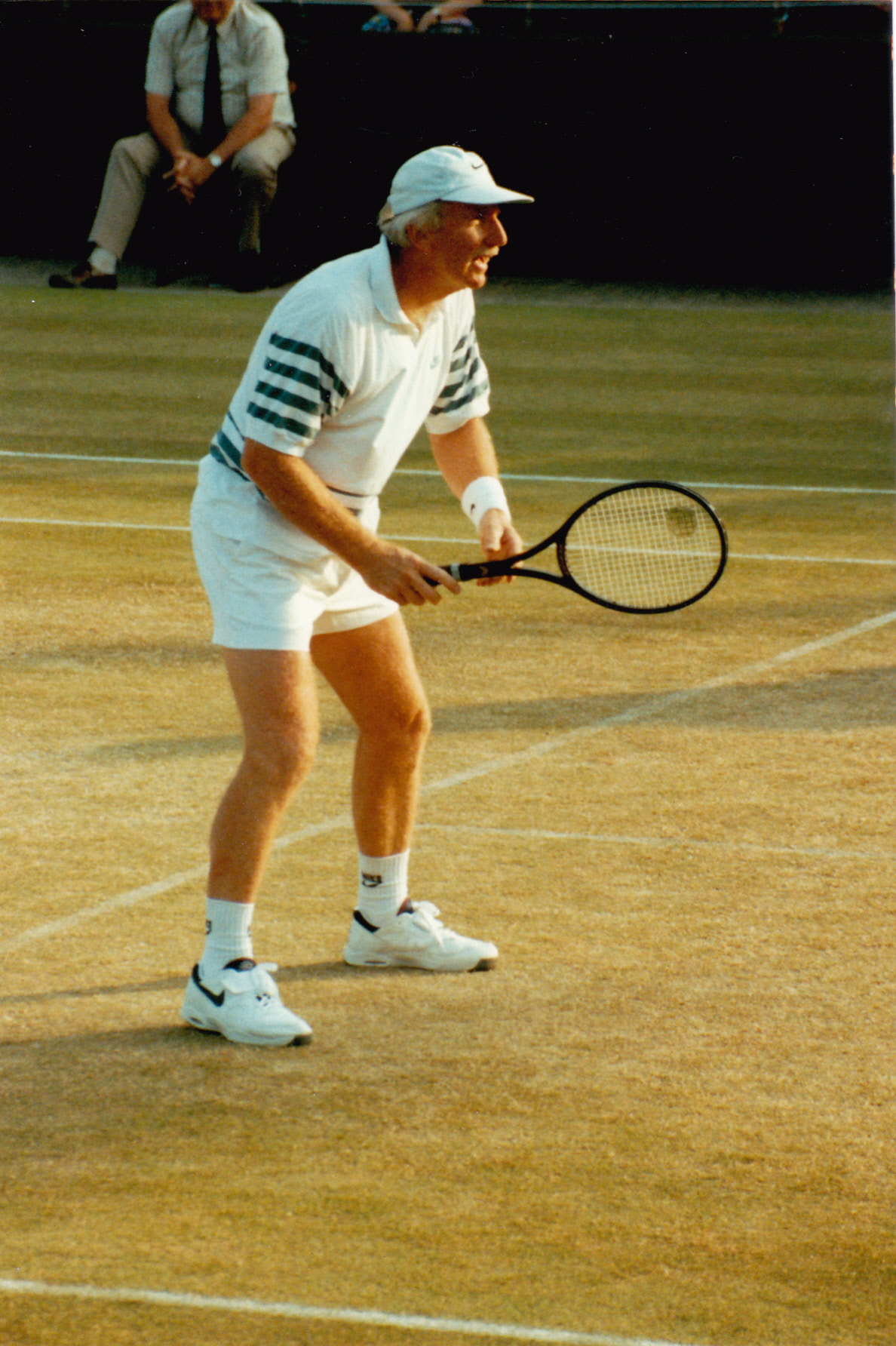
- Wimbledon 1985, Over 35's Doubles
- Country (sports): Australia
- Born: 4 July 1940 Melbourne, Australia
- Died: 18 November 2003 (aged 63) Melbourne, Australia
- Height: 183 cm (6 ft 0 in)
- Turned pro: 1968 (amateur from 1963)
- Retired: 1979
- Plays: Right-handed (one-handed backhand)

Singles
- Career record: 170–224 (Open era)
- Career titles: 1
- Highest ranking: No. 10 (1970, world's top 10)

Grand Slam singles results
- Australian Open: QF (1973)
- French Open: 4R (1968)
- Wimbledon: QF (1970)
- US Open: 4R (1971)

Doubles
- Career record: 312–215 (Open era)
- Career titles: 12

Grand Slam doubles results
- Australian Open: F (1975)
- French Open: SF (1971, 1973)
- Wimbledon: SF (1977)
- US Open: SF (1977)

Grand Slam mixed doubles results
- Wimbledon: QF (1970)

Bob "Nails" Carmichael (4 July 1940 – 18 November 2003) was an Australian tennis player and coach.

As a player, Carmichael won one singles title and 12 doubles titles, and achieved a top-ten ranking in 1970. Partnering Allan Stone, he reached the doubles final of the 1975 Australian Open.

Following his retirement in 1979, Carmichael was a coach for Tennis Australia, and the Australian Institute of Sport. He coached top-ranking professionals Patrick Rafter, Lleyton Hewitt, Darren Cahill and Leander Paes.

== Open Era career finals ==
=== Singles: 5 (1 title / 4 runner-ups) ===
Result	W-L	Date	Tournament	Surface	Opponent	Score
Loss	0–1	Aug 1969	Haverford, US	Grass	(United States) Cliff Richey	4–6, 9–7, 2–6, 4–6
Loss	0–2	Apr 1970	Charlotte, US	Clay	(United States) Cliff Richey	4–6, 4–6
Loss	0–3	Aug 1970	South Orange, US	Grass	(Australia) Rod Laver	4–6, 2–6, 2–6
Win	1–3	Mar 1971	Auckland, New Zealand	Hard	(Australia) Allan Stone	7–6, 7–6, 6–3
Loss	1–4	Apr 1976	Sacramento, US	Carpet (i)	(United States) Tom Gorman	2–6, 4–6

=== Doubles: 34 (12 titles / 22 runner-ups) ===
Result	W-L	Date	Tournament	Surface	Partner	Opponents	Score
Loss	0–1	Nov 1970	Stockholm, Sweden	Hard (i)	(Australia) Owen Davidson	(United States) Arthur Ashe (United States) Stan Smith	0–6, 7–5, 5–7
Win	1–1	Nov 1970	Buenos Aires, Argentina	Clay	(Australia) Ray Ruffels	(Socialist Federal Republic of Yugoslavia) Željko Franulović (Czechoslovakia) Jan Kodeš	7–5, 6–2, 5–7, 6–7, 6–3
Win	2–1	Mar 1971	Auckland, New Zealand	Grass	(Australia) Ray Ruffels	(New Zealand) Brian Fairlie (South Africa) Raymond Moore	6–3, 6–7, 6–4, 4–6, 6–3
Loss	2–2	May 1971	Tehran WCT, Iran	Clay	(Australia) Ray Ruffels	(Australia) John Newcombe (Australia) Tony Roche	4–6, 7–6, 1–6
Loss	2–3	Jul 1971	Washington WCT, US	Clay	(Australia) Ray Ruffels	(Netherlands) Tom Okker (United States) Marty Riessen	6–7, 2–6
Win	3–3	Aug 1971	South Orange, US	Hard	(United States) Tom Leonard	(United States) Clark Graebner (United States) Erik van Dillen	6–4, 4–6, 6–4
Win	4–3	Feb 1972	Toronto WCT, Canada	Carpet (i)	(Australia) Ray Ruffels	(Australia) Roy Emerson (Australia) Rod Laver	6–4, 4–6, 6–4
Win	5–3	Apr 1972	Quebec WCT, Canada	Hard (i)	(Australia) Ray Ruffels	(Australia) John Alexander (Australia) Terry Addison	4–6, 6–3, 7–5
Loss	5–4	Dec 1972	Johannesburg, South Africa	Hard	(Australia) Terry Addison	(Australia) John Newcombe (Australia) Fred Stolle	3–6, 4–6
Loss	5–5	Jun 1973	Nottingham, UK	Grass	(South Africa) Frew McMillan	(United States) Tom Gorman (United States) Erik van Dillen	4–6, 1–6
Loss	5–6	Jul 1973	Båstad, Sweden	Clay	(South Africa) Frew McMillan	(Socialist Federal Republic of Yugoslavia) Nikola Pilić (United States) Stan Smith	6–2, 4–6, 4–6
Loss	5–7	Jul 1973	Bretton Woods, US	Clay	(South Africa) Frew McMillan	(Australia) Rod Laver (Australia) Fred Stolle	6–7, 6–4, 5–7
Win	6–7	Aug 1973	Tanglewood, US	Other	(South Africa) Frew McMillan	(Egypt) Ismail El Shafei (New Zealand) Brian Fairlie	6–3, 6–4
Win	7–7	Aug 1973	Indianapolis, US	Clay	(South Africa) Frew McMillan	(Spain) Manuel Orantes (Romania) Ion Țiriac	6–3, 6–4
Loss	7–8	Sep 1973	Seattle, US	Hard	(South Africa) Frew McMillan	(United States) Tom Gorman (Netherlands) Tom Okker	6–2, 4–6, 6–7
Win	8–8	Oct 1973	Quebec WCT, Canada	Hard (i)	(South Africa) Frew McMillan	(United States) Jimmy Connors (United States) Marty Riessen	6–2, 7–6
Loss	8–9	Oct 1973	Madrid, Spain	Clay	(South Africa) Frew McMillan	(Romania) Ilie Năstase (Netherlands) Tom Okker	3–6, 0–6
Loss	8–10	Nov 1973	Stockholm, Sweden	Hard (i)	(South Africa) Frew McMillan	(United States) Jimmy Connors (Romania) Ilie Năstase	3–6, 7–6, 2–6
Loss	8–11	Jan 1975	Australian Open, Melbourne	Grass	(Australia) Allan Stone	(Australia) John Alexander (Australia) Phil Dent	3–6, 6–7
Win	9–11	Jan 1975	Auckland, New Zealand	Grass	(Australia) Ray Ruffels	(New Zealand) Brian Fairlie (New Zealand) Onny Parun	7–6, ret.
Loss	9–12	Apr 1975	Denver WCT, US	Carpet (i)	(Australia) Allan Stone	(Australia) Roy Emerson (Australia) Rod Laver	2–6, 6–3, 5–7
Loss	9–13	May 1975	Las Vegas, US	Hard	(South Africa) Cliff Drysdale	(Australia) John Alexander (Australia) Phil Dent	1–6, 4–6
Loss	9–14	Nov 1975	Hong Kong	Hard	(United States) Gene Mayer	(Netherlands) Tom Okker (Australia) Ken Rosewall	3–6, 4–6
Loss	9–15	May 1976	Düsseldorf, Germany	Clay	(South Africa) Raymond Moore	(Poland) Wojciech Fibak (West Germany) Karl Meiler	4–6, 6–4, 4–6
Loss	9–16	Oct 1976	Perth, Australia	Hard	(Egypt) Ismail El Shafei	(United States) Dick Stockton (United States) Roscoe Tanner	7–6, 1–6, 2–6
Win	10–16	Nov 1976	Tokyo Outdoor, Japan	Hard	(Australia) Ken Rosewall	(Egypt) Ismail El Shafei (New Zealand) Brian Fairlie	6–4, 6–4
Win	11–16	Nov 1976	Bangalore, India	Clay	(Australia) Ray Ruffels	(India) Chiradip Mukerjea (India) Bhanu Nunna	6–2, 7–6
Loss	11–17	Mar 1978	Miami, US	Carpet (i)	(United States) Brian Teacher	(United States) Tom Gullikson (United States) Gene Mayer	6–7, 3–6
Win	12–17	Jul 1978	Båstad, Sweden	Clay	(Australia) Mark Edmondson	(Hungary) Péter Szőke (Hungary) Balázs Taróczy	7–5, 6–4
Loss	12–18	Jul 1978	Hilversum, Netherlands	Clay	(Australia) Mark Edmondson	(Netherlands) Tom Okker (Hungary) Balázs Taróczy	6–7, 6–4, 5–7
Loss	12–19	Dec 1978	Sydney Outdoor, Australia	Grass	(Australia) Syd Ball	(United States) Hank Pfister (United States) Sherwood Stewart	4–6, 4–6
Loss	12–20	Mar 1979	Washington Indoor, US	Carpet (i)	(United States) Brian Teacher	(United States) Bob Lutz (United States) Stan Smith	4–6, 5–7, 6–3, 6–7
Loss	12–21	Apr 1979	Stuttgart, West Germany	Hard (i)	(United States) Brian Teacher	(Poland) Wojciech Fibak (Netherlands) Tom Okker	3–6, 7–5, 6–7
Loss	12–22	Sep 1979	Woodlands Doubles, US	Hard	(United States) Tim Gullikson	(United States) Marty Riessen (United States) Sherwood Stewart	3–6, 2–2 ret.
