= Rod Laver career statistics =

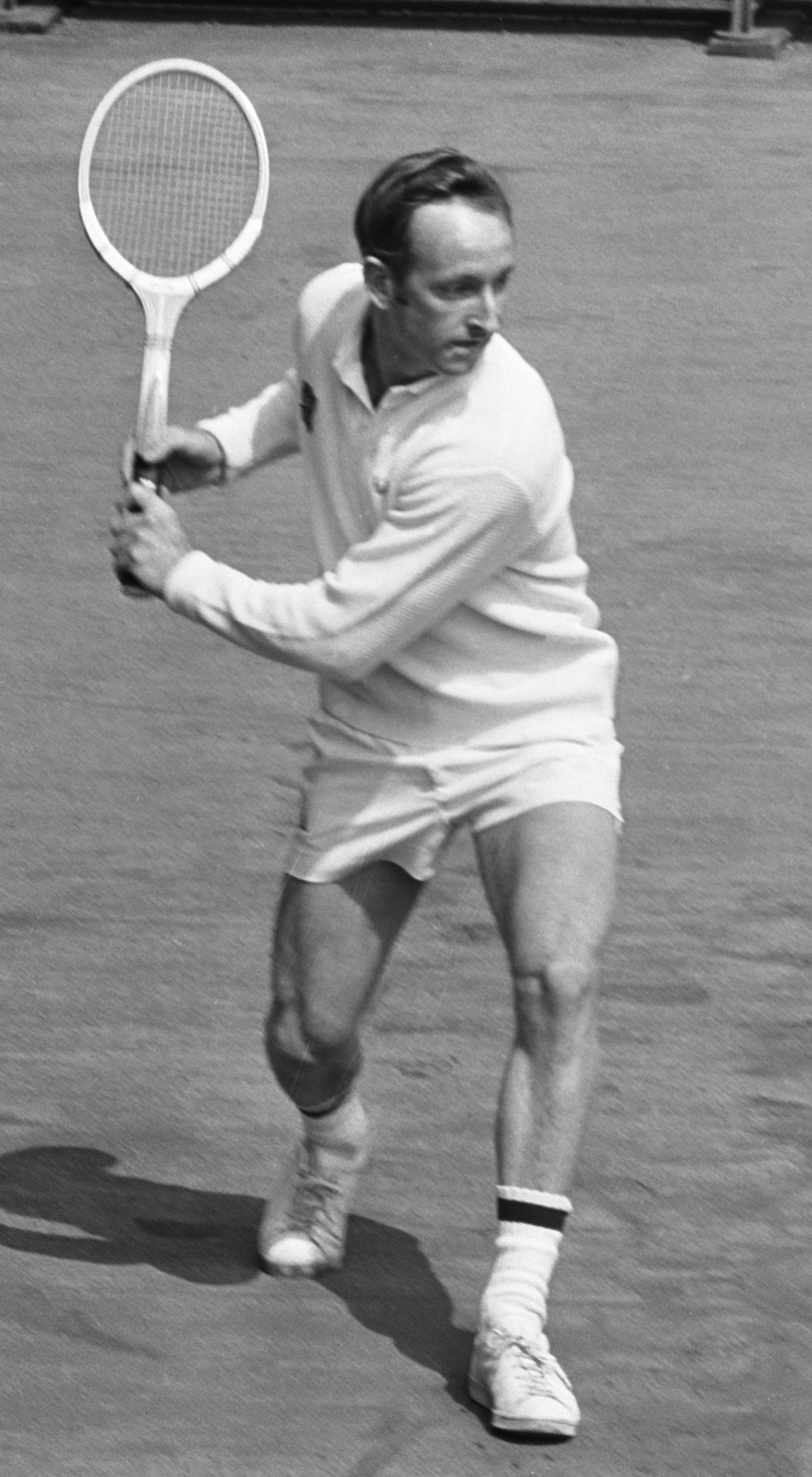
Rod Laver in May 1969 at the Amsterdam Pro tournament

This is a list of the main career statistics of Australian former tennis player Rod Laver whose playing career ran from 1956 until 1977. He played as an amateur from 1956 until the end of 1962 when he joined Jack Kramer's professional circuit. As a professional he was banned from playing the Grand Slam tournaments as well as other tournaments organized by the national associations of the International Lawn Tennis Federation (ILTF). In 1968, with the advent of the Open Era, the distinction between amateurs and professionals disappeared and Laver was again able to compete in most (Note: Power struggles between the ILTF and the commercial promoters National Tennis League (NTL) and World Championship Tennis (WCT) resulted in Laver missing a number of Grand Slam tournaments during the early 1970s.) Grand Slam events until the end of his career in 1977. During his career he won eleven Grand Slam tournaments, eight Pro Slam tournaments and five Davis Cup titles.

== Grand Slam finals ==
=== Singles: 17 finals (11 titles, 6 runner-ups) ===
Result	Year	Championship	Surface	Opponent	Score
Loss	1959	Wimbledon	Grass	(United States) Alex Olmedo	4–6, 3–6, 4–6
Win	1960	Australian Championships	Grass	(Australia) Neale Fraser	5–7, 3–6, 6–3, 8–6, 8–6
Loss	1960	Wimbledon	Grass	(Australia) Neale Fraser	4–6, 6–3, 7–9, 5–7
Loss	1960	U.S. Championships	Grass	(Australia) Neale Fraser	4–6, 4–6, 7–9
Loss	1961	Australian Championships	Grass	(Australia) Roy Emerson	6–1, 3–6, 5–7, 4–6
Win	1961	Wimbledon	Grass	(United States) Chuck McKinley	6–3, 6–1, 6–4
Loss	1961	U.S. Championships	Grass	(Australia) Roy Emerson	5–7, 3–6, 2–6
Win	1962	Australian Championships (2)	Grass	(Australia) Roy Emerson	8–6, 0–6, 6–4, 6–4
Win	1962	French Championships	Clay	(Australia) Roy Emerson	3–6, 2–6, 6–3, 9–7, 6–2
Win	1962	Wimbledon (2)	Grass	(Australia) Marty Mulligan	6–2, 6–2, 6–1
Win	1962	U.S. Championships	Grass	(Australia) Roy Emerson	6–2, 6–4, 5–7, 6–4
↓ Open Era ↓
Loss	1968	French Open	Clay	(Australia) Ken Rosewall	3–6, 1–6, 6–2, 2–6
Win	1968	Wimbledon (3)	Grass	(Australia) Tony Roche	6–3, 6–4, 6–2
Win	1969	Australian Open (3)	Grass	(Spain) Andrés Gimeno	6–3, 6–4, 7–5
Win	1969	French Open (2)	Clay	(Australia) Ken Rosewall	6–4, 6–3, 6–4
Win	1969	Wimbledon (4)	Grass	(Australia) John Newcombe	6–4, 5–7, 6–4, 6–4
Win	1969	US Open (2)	Grass	(Australia) Tony Roche	7–9, 6–1, 6–2, 6–2

=== Doubles: 12 finals (6 titles, 6 runner-ups) ===
Result	Year	Championship	Surface	Partner	Opponents	Score
Win	1959	Australian Championships	Grass	(Australia) Bob Mark	(Australia) Don Candy (Australia) Bob Howe	9–7, 6–4, 6–2
Loss	1959	Wimbledon	Grass	(Australia) Bob Mark	(Australia) Roy Emerson (Australia) Neale Fraser	6–8, 3–6, 16–14, 7–9
Win	1960	Australian Championships	Grass	(Australia) Bob Mark	(Australia) Roy Emerson (Australia) Neale Fraser	1–6, 6–2, 6–4, 6–4
Loss	1960	US National Championships	Grass	(Australia) Bob Mark	(Australia) Roy Emerson (Australia) Neale Fraser	7–9, 2–6, 4–6
Win	1961	Australian Championships	Grass	(Australia) Bob Mark	(Australia) Roy Emerson (Australia) Martin Mulligan	6–3, 7–5, 3–6, 9–11, 6–2
Win	1961	French Championships	Clay	(Australia) Roy Emerson	(Australia) Bob Howe (Australia) Bob Mark	3–6, 6–1, 6–4
↓ Open Era ↓
Loss	1968	French Open	Clay	(Australia) Roy Emerson	(Australia) Ken Rosewall (Australia) Fred Stolle	3–6, 4–6, 3–6
Win	1969	Australian Open	Grass	(Australia) Roy Emerson	(Australia) Ken Rosewall (Australia) Fred Stolle	6–4, 6–4
Loss	1969	French Open	Clay	(Australia) Roy Emerson	(Australia) John Newcombe (Australia) Tony Roche	6–4, 1–6, 6–3, 4–6, 4–6
Loss	1970	US Open	Grass	(Australia) Roy Emerson	(France) Pierre Barthès (Socialist Federal Republic of Yugoslavia) Nikola Pilić	3–6, 6–7, 6–4, 6–7
Win	1971	Wimbledon	Grass	(Australia) Roy Emerson	(United States) Arthur Ashe (United States) Dennis Ralston	4–6, 9–7, 6–8, 6–4, 6–4
Loss	1973	US Open	Grass	(Australia) Ken Rosewall	(Australia) Owen Davidson (Australia) John Newcombe	5–7, 6–2, 5–7, 5–7

=== Mixed doubles: 5 finals (3 titles, 2 runner-ups) ===
Result	Year	Championship	Surface	Partner	Opponents	Score
Loss	1959	Australian Championships	Grass	(South Africa) Renée Schuurman	(South Africa) Sandra Reynolds (Australia) Bob Mark	6–4, 11–13, 1–6
Loss	1959	French Championships	Clay	(South Africa) Renée Schuurman	(Mexico) Yola Ramírez (United Kingdom) Billy Knight	4–6, 4–6
Win	1959	Wimbledon	Grass	(United States) Darlene Hard	(Australia) Neale Fraser (Brazil) Maria Bueno	4–6, 3–6
Win	1960	Wimbledon	Grass	(United States) Darlene Hard	(Australia) Robert Howe (Brazil) Maria Bueno	13–11, 3–6, 8–6
Win	1961	French Championships	Clay	(United States) Darlene Hard	(Czechoslovakia) Věra Suková (Czechoslovakia) Jiří Javorský	0–6, 6–2, 3–6

== Pro Slam finals ==
- Before the Open Era.

=== Singles: 14 (8 titles, 6 runner-ups) ===
Result	Year	Championship	Surface	Opponent	Score
Loss	1963	French Championship	Wood (i)	(Australia) Ken Rosewall	8–6, 4–6, 7–5, 3–6, 4–6
Loss	1963	U.S. Championship	Grass	(Australia) Ken Rosewall	4–6, 2–6, 2–6
Loss	1964	French Championship	Wood (i)	(Australia) Ken Rosewall	3–6, 5–7, 6–3, 3–6
Win	1964	Wembley Championship	Wood (i)	(Australia) Ken Rosewall	7–5, 4–6, 5–7, 8–6, 8–6
Win	1964	U.S. Championship	Grass	(United States) Pancho Gonzales	4–6, 6–3, 7–5, 6–4
Loss	1965	French Championship	Wood (i)	(Australia) Ken Rosewall	3–6, 2–6, 4–6
Win	1965	Wembley Pro	Wood (i)	(Spain) Andrés Gimeno	6–2, 6–3, 6–4
Loss	1965	U.S. Championship	Grass	(Australia) Ken Rosewall	4–6, 3–6, 3–6
Loss	1966	French Championship	Wood (i)	(Australia) Ken Rosewall	3–6, 2–6, 12–14
Win	1966	Wembley Championship	Wood (i)	(Australia) Ken Rosewall	6–2, 6–2, 6–3
Win	1966	U.S. Championship	Grass	(Australia) Ken Rosewall	6–4, 4–6, 6–2, 8–10, 6–3
Win	1967	French Championship	Wood (i)	(Spain) Andrés Gimeno	6–4, 8–6, 4–6, 6–2
Win	1967	Wembley Championship	Wood (i)	(Australia) Ken Rosewall	2–6, 6–1, 1–6, 8–6, 6–2
Win	1967	U.S. Championship	Grass	(Spain) Andrés Gimeno	4–6, 6–4, 6–3, 7–5

== Performance timeline ==
Key
W	F	SF	QF	#R	RR	Q#	DNQ	A	NH

(W) winner; (F) finalist; (SF) semifinalist; (QF) quarterfinalist; (#R) rounds 4, 3, 2, 1; (RR) round-robin stage; (Q#) qualification round; (DNQ) did not qualify; (A) absent; (NH) not held; (SR) strike rate (events won / competed); (W–L) win–loss record.

Laver joined Professional tennis in 1963 and was unable to compete in the Grand Slams until the start of the Open Era at the 1968 French Open.

Tournament	Amateur career							Professional career					Open career										Titles / played	Career W–L	Career win%
Tournament	'56	'57	'58	'59	'60	'61	'62	'63	'64	'65	'66	'67	'68	'69	'70	'71	'72	'73	'74	'75	'76	'77	Titles / played	Career W–L	Career win%
Grand Slam Tournaments																							11 / 40	141–29	82.94
Australian Open	1R	1R	2R	3R	W	F	W	A	A	A	A	A	A	W	A	3R	A	A	A	A	A	A	3 / 9	22–6	78.57
French Open	1R	A	2R	3R	3R	SF	W	A	A	A	A	A	F	W	A	A	A	A	A	A	A	A	2 / 8	25–6	80.65
Wimbledon	1R	A	3R	F	F	W	W	A	A	A	A	A	W	W	4R	QF	A	A	A	A	A	2R	4 / 11	50–7	87.72
US Open	1R	A	4R	QF	F	F	W	A	A	A	A	A	4R	W	4R	A	4R	3R	A	4R	A	A	2 / 12	44–10	81.48
Pro Slam Tournaments																							8 / 15	38–7	84.44
U.S. Pro	A	A	A	A	A	A	A	F	W	F	W	W	not a Major										3 / 5	14–2	87.50
French Pro	A	A	A	A	A	A	A	F	F	F	F	W	not a Major										1 / 5	12–4	75.00
Wembley Pro	A	A	A	A	A	A	A	QF	W	W	W	W	not a Major										4 / 5	12–1	92.31
Total:																							19 / 55	179–36	83.26
Other events
Wimbledon Pro	not held											W	not held										1 / 1	3–0	100

== Season-ending championships ==
=== Masters Grand Prix (1 runner-up) ===
Tokyo 1970

Standings

Player	RR W–L	Sets W–L	Games W–L	Standings
(United States) Stan Smith	4–1	9–3	71–53	1
(Australia) Rod Laver	4–1	9–3	69–55	2
(Australia) Ken Rosewall	3–2	6–4	59–51	3
(United States) Arthur Ashe	3–2	6–7	58–53	4
(Socialist Federal Republic of Yugoslavia) Željko Franulović	1–4	5–9	55–70	5
(Czechoslovakia) Jan Kodeš	0–5	2–10	47–67	6

=== WCT (2 runner-ups) ===
Result	Year	Championship	Surface	Opponent	Score
Loss	1971	Dallas	Carpet (i)	(Australia) Ken Rosewall	4–6, 6–1, 6–7, 6–7
Loss	1972	Dallas	Carpet (i)	(Australia) Ken Rosewall	6–4, 0–6, 6–3, 6–7, 6–7

== Career finals ==
=== Singles (200 titles) ===
Overview

Amateur (53)							Professional (72)						Open Era (75)									Total
1956	1957	1958	1959	1960	1961	1962	1963	1964	1965	1966	1967	1968	1968	1969	1970	1971	1972	1973	1974	1975	1976	Total
0	2	3	1	9	16	22	6	11	17	16	19	3	10	18	15	8	5	7	6	5	1	200

==== Amateur (53 titles) ====
No.	Date	Tournament Name and Location	Surface	Opponent	Score
1.	Mar 1957	Queensland Bay, Redcliffe	Grass	(Australia) Barry Green	6–1, 6–4
2.	Apr 1957	Queensland Central, Rockhampton	Grass	(Australia) Ken Fletcher	7–5, 6–3
3.	Mar 1958	Queensland Bay, Redcliffe	Grass	(Australia) G. Gaydon	4–6, 6–4, 6–3
5.	May 1958	Maroochy Championships, Nambour	Clay	(Australia) Mal Anderson	6–3, 6–2
6.	Oct 1958	South Coast Championships, Southport	Grass	(Australia) Neil Gibson	7–9, 6–3, 6–4
7.	Mar 1959	Queensland Central, Rockhampton	Grass	(Australia) Frank Gorman	6–1, 6–2
8.	Jan 1960	Australian Championships, Brisbane	Grass	(Australia) Neale Fraser	5–7, 3–6, 6–3, 8–6, 8–6
9.	Apr 1960	Queensland Championships, Wynnum	Grass	(Australia) Neil Gibson	6–3, 6–0
10.	Apr 1960	Maroochy Championships Nambour	Clay	(Australia) Ken Fletcher	3–6, 7–5, 6–3
11.	May 1960	Vaud International Championships, Lausanne Switzerland	Clay	(Brazil) Ronald Barnes	6–4, 6–2, 6–4
12.	Jul 1960	Pennsylvania Lawn Tennis Championships, Haverford, US	Grass	(United States) Ronald Holmberg	9–7, 8–6, 6–3
13.	Aug 1960	Meadow Club Invitational, Southampton, US	Grass	(United States) Ronald Holmberg (2)	12–10, 6–3, 3–6, 2–6, 6–3
14.	Aug 1960	Eastern Grass Court Championships, South Orange, US	Grass	(United States) Donald Dell	6–1, 10–8, 6–4
15.	Aug 1960	Newport Casino Invitational, Rhode Island, US	Grass	(United States) Butch Buchholz	6–1, 6–8, 6–1, 6–2
16.	Oct 1960	Queensland Hard Court Championships, Kingaroy, Australia	Clay	(Australia) Neil Gibson	2–6, 6–4, 6–2
17.	Jan 1961	South Australian Championships, Adelaide, Australia	Grass	(United Kingdom) Mike Sangster	11–9, 3–6, 4–6, 14–12, 6–3
18.	Feb 1961	New Zealand Championships, Auckland	Grass	(Australia) Roy Emerson (2)	4–6, 6–3, 6–2, 3–6, 7–5
19.	Feb 1961	St. Andrew International Invitation, Kingston, Jamaica	Grass	(Australia) Roy Emerson (3)	4–6, 6–3, 6–4
20.	Feb 1961	Altamira Invitational, Caracas, Venezuela	Hard	(Chile) Luis Ayala	4–6, 6–4, 6–3, 4–6, 8–6
21.	Apr 1961	River Oaks Championships, Houston, Texas, US	Clay	(Australia) Roy Emerson (4)	7–5, 7–5, 1–6, 6–3
22.	Jun 1961	Wimbledon, London	Grass	(United States) Chuck McKinley	6–3, 6–1, 6–4
23.	Jul 1961	Centennial Cup, Deauville, France	Clay	(Czech Republic) Jaroslav Drobný	6–2, 6–4
24.	Jul 1961	Colonel Kuntz Cup, Deauville, France	Clay	(France) Michel Leclercq	6–2, 6–3
25.	Jul 1961	Bad Neuenahr International, Bad Neuenahr, Germany	Clay	(Chile) Luis Ayala (2)	6–4, 4–6, 6–3
26.	Aug 1961	German Championships, Hamburg, Germany	Clay	(Chile) Luis Ayala (3)	6–2, 6–8, 5–7, 6–1, 6–2
27.	Aug 1961	Austrian Championships, Pörtschach	Clay	(Australia) Roy Emerson (5)	2–6, 6–3, 7–5
28.	Oct 1961	New South Wales Metropolitan, Sydney, Australie	Grass	(South Africa) Bob Hewitt	1–6, 6–2, 6–3
29.	Oct 1961	Queensland Hard Court Championships, Gladstone, Australia (2)	Clay	(Australia) Roy Emerson (6)	7–5, 6–3
30.	Oct 1961	Queensland Championships, Brisbane, Australia	Grass	(Australia) Roy Emerson (7)	4–6, 4–6, 6–0, 8–6, 6–3
31.	Dec 1961	Victorian Championships, Melbourne	Grass	(Australia) Roy Emerson (8)	4–6, 8–6, 9–7, 6–3
32.	Dec 1961	New South Wales Championships, Sydney	Grass	(Australia) Roy Emerson (9)	8–6, 6–3, 3–6, 4–6, 6–4
33.	Dec 1961	Manly Seaside Championships, Sydney	Grass	(South Africa) Bob Hewitt (2)	6–3, 6–3
34.	Jan 1962	Australian Championships, Sydney (2)	Grass	(Australia) Roy Emerson (10)	8–6, 0–6, 6–4, 6–4
35.	Jan 1962	Tasmanian Championships, Hobart, Australia	Grass	(Australia) Neale Fraser (3)	7–5, 0–6, 0–6, 6–1, 6–2
36.	Mar 1962	Altamira Invitational, Caracas, Venezuela (2)	Hard	(Australia) Roy Emerson (11)	9–7, 6–2, 6–0
37.	Apr 1962	River Oaks Championships, Houston, Texas, US (2)	Clay	(Australia) Roy Emerson (12)	6–1, 7–5, 7–5
38.	Apr 1962	Rothmans Connaught Hard Court Championships, Chingford, UK	Clay	(Australia) Martin Mulligan	4–6, 6–4, 6–4
39.	Apr 1962	British Hard Court Championships, Bournemouth, UK	Clay	(New Zealand) Ian Crookenden	6–3, 6–3, 6–3
40.	Apr 1962	Sicilian International Championships, Palermo, Italy	Clay	(Australia) Neale Fraser (4)	6–4, 6–2, 4–6, 6–1
41.	May 1962	Italian Championships, Rome	Clay	(Australia) Roy Emerson (13)	6–2, 1–6, 3–6, 6–3, 6–1
42.	May 1962	Swiss International Championships, Lugano	Clay	(India) Ramanathan Krishnan	6–4, 6–2
43.	May 1962	French Championships, Paris	Clay	(Australia) Roy Emerson (14)	3–6, 2–6, 6–3, 9–7, 6–2
44.	Jun 1962	International Hard Court Championships, Oslo, Norway	Clay	(Sweden) Jan-Erik Lundqvist	6–1, 4–6, 6–4, 6–3
45.	Jun 1962	London Grass Court Championships, London	Grass	(Australia) Roy Emerson (15)	6–4, 7–5
46.	Jun 1962	Wimbledon Championships, London (2)	Grass	(Australia) Martin Mulligan	6–2, 6–2, 6–1
47.	Jul 1962	Irish Championships, Dublin	Grass	(United Kingdom) Robert Wilson	Walkover
48.	Jul 1962	Gstaad International, Switzerland	Clay	(Australia) Neale Fraser (5)	6–4, 6–4, 8–6
49.	Jul 1962	Dutch Championships, Hilversum, Netherlands	Clay	(India) Ramanathan Krishnan (2)	4–6, 6–3, 6–3, 7–5
50.	Jul 1962	German Championships, Hamburg, Germany (2)	Clay	(Spain) Manuel Santana	8–6, 7–5, 6–4
51.	Aug 1962	U.S. Championships, New York City	Grass	(Australia) Roy Emerson (16)	6–2, 6–4, 5–7, 6–4
52.	Oct 1962	Queensland Hard Court Championships, Warwick, Australia (3)	Clay	(Australia) Ken Fletcher	8–6, 6–3
53.	Oct 1962	Australian Hard Court Championships, Sydney	Clay	(Australia) Fred Stolle	6–2, 2–6, 6–4, 4–6, 8–6
53.	Dec 1962	Victorian Championships, Melbourne (2)	Grass	(Australia) Neale Fraser (6)	3–6, 9–7, 6–1, 6–8, 6–0

==== Professional: before the Open Era (72 titles) ====
Era total	Career (total)	Date	Tournament Name and Location	Surface	Opponent	Score
1.	54.	Aug 1963	Kitzbühel Professional Championships, Austria	Clay	(Australia) Ken Rosewall	6–3, 6–4, 6–4
2.	55.	Aug 1963	Cannes Pro Championships, France	Wood (i)	(Australia) Ken Rosewall	6–2, 6–3, 6–4
3.	56.	Aug 1963	Dutch Professional Championships, Noordwijk-on-Sea, Netherlands	Clay	(United States) Butch Buchholz	6–2, 6–3, 6–3
4.	57.	Oct 1963	Johannesburg Professional Championships, South Africa	Hard	(United Kingdom) Michael Davies	4–6, 8–6, 6–2
5.	58.	Oct 1963	Salisbury Rhodesian Professional Championships	Hard	(United States) Alex Olmedo	6–3, 10–8
6.	59.	Oct 1963	Western Cape Province Professional Championships, Cape Town, South Africa	Hard	(United States) Alex Olmedo	6–0, 6–4
7.	60.	Jan 1964	Western Australian Professional Championships (4-man round robin), Perth	Grass	(Australia) Ken Rosewall (2nd)	6–2, 6–1
8.	61.	Jun 1964	Monterey Professional Championships, California, US	?	(United States) Alex Olmedo	10–8, 6–1
9.	62.	Jul 1964	U.S. Professional Championships, Chestnut Hill, Massachusetts, US	Grass	(United States) Pancho Gonzales	4–6, 6–3, 7–5, 6–4
10.	63.	Aug 1964	Biarritz Professional Championships (4-man), France	?	(Australia) Lew Hoad	6–3, 3–6, 6–3
11.	64.	Aug 1964	Geneva Professional Championships, Switzerland	Clay (?)	(United States) Pancho Gonzales	4–6, 6–3, 6–1
12.	65.	Sep 1964	London Professional Championships, Wembley Arena, London	Wood (i)	(Australia) Ken Rosewall	7–5, 5–7, 4–6, 8–6, 8–6
13.	66.	Oct 1964	Rhodesian Professional Championships, Salisbury	?	(United States) Butch Buchholz	6–3, 4–6, 10–8
14.	67.	Oct 1964	Johannesburg Professional Championships, South Africa (2)	Hard	(Australia) Lew Hoad	10–8, 6–3
15.	68.	Oct 1964	Eastern Cape Province Professional Championships, Port Elizabeth, South Africa	?	(Australia) Frank Sedgman	8–6 (pro set)
16.	69.	Nov 1964	Egyptian Professional Championships (4-man), Cairo, Egypt	Clay	(Spain) Andrés Gimeno	6–3, 6–3
17.	70.	Nov 1964	Marseille Professional Championships (4-man), France	?	(United States) Butch Buchholz	6–2, 6–4
18.	71.	Jan 1965	South Australian Professional Championships, Adelaide, Australia	Grass	(Australia) Ken Rosewall	6–3, 6–4
19.	72.	Feb 1965	Western Australian Professional Championships, Perth (2)	Grass	(United States) Pancho Gonzales	7–5, 11–9
20.	73.	Feb 1965	Victorian Professional Championships, Melbourne	Grass	(Australia) Ken Rosewall	2–6, 6–1, 6–4
21.	74.	Feb 1965	Tasmanian Professional Championships (4-man), Hobart, Australia	Grass	(Australia) Lew Hoad	3–6, 8–6, 7–5
22.	75.	Apr 1965	Oklahoma City Professional Championships (4-man), Oklahoma, US	?	(United States) Pancho Gonzales	6–3, 6–4
23.	76.	Apr 1965	U.S. Professional ? Championships, New York City	?	(United States) Pancho Gonzales	6–3, 6–2
24.	77.	May 1965	Los Angeles Professional Championships (round robin), US	?	(United States) Pancho Gonzales	3–6, 6–3, 7–5
25.	78.	May 1965	Peacock Gap Professional Championships, San Rafael, California, US	?	(United States) Pancho Gonzales	6–1, 6–4
26.	79.	Jun 1965	Tahoe Racquet Club Professional Championships, Lake Tahoe, Nevada, US	?	(United States) Pancho Gonzales	6–3, 2–6, 6–4
27.	80.	Jul 1965	Newport Professional Championships (round robin), Rhode Island, US	Grass	(Australia) Ken Rosewall (2nd)	N/A
28.	81.	Jul 1965	Belfast Professional Championships (4-man), UK	?	(Spain) Andrés Gimeno	6–4, 6–4
29.	82.	Aug 1965	Cannes Professional Championships, France (2)	Wood (i) ?	(Spain) Andrés Gimeno	7–5, 7–5, 6–3
30.	83.	Sep 1965	London Professional Championships, Wembley Arena, London (2)	Wood (i)	(Spain) Andrés Gimeno	6–2, 6–3, 6–4
31.	84.	Oct 1965	Nairobi Professional Championships, Kenya	?	(Australia) Ken Rosewall	6–1, 4–6, 6–2
32.	85.	Oct 1965	Rhodesian Professional Championships, Salisbury (2)	?	(Australia) Ken Rosewall	3–6, 6–4, 6–1
33.	86.	Oct 1965	Durban Natal Professional Championships, South Africa	?	(Australia) Ken Rosewall	6–2, 8–6
34.	87.	Nov 1965	Western Cape Province Professional Championships, Cape Town, South Africa (2)	?	(Australia) Ken Rosewall	4–6, 6–3, 6–3
35.	88.	Jan 1966 (Note: Final.)	Queensland Professional Championships, Brisbane, Australia	Grass	(Spain) Andrés Gimeno	6–3, 6–4
36.	89.	Jan 1966	Victorian Professional Championships, Melbourne (2)	Grass	(Australia) Ken Rosewall	6–3, 6–0
37.	90.	Jan 1966	Western Australian Professional Championships, Perth (3)	Grass	(Australia) Ken Rosewall	6–2, 10–8
38.	91.	Apr 1966	Nancy Professional Championships (4-man), France	?	(Spain) Andrés Gimeno	7–5, 6–3
39.	92.	Apr 1966	Cannes Professional Championships (4-man), France (3)	Wood (i) ?	(Spain) Andrés Gimeno	7–5, 6–3
40.	93.	Jun 1966	Forest Hills Professional Championships (round robin), New York City	Grass	(Australia) Ken Rosewall	31–29
41.	94.	Jul 1966	U.S. Professional Championships, Chestnut Hill, Massachusetts, US (2)	Grass	(Australia) Ken Rosewall	6–4, 4–6, 6–2, 8–10, 6–3
42.	95.	Jul 1966	Binghamton Professional Championships (round robin), New York, US	?	(Ecuador) Pancho Segura	31–18, 31–18
43.	96.	Aug 1966	Oporto Professional Championships, Portugal	?	(France) Pierre Barthès	6–4, 8–6
44.	97.	Sep 1966	London Professional Championships, Wembley Arena, London (3)	Wood (i)	(Australia) Ken Rosewall	6–2, 6–2, 6–3
45.	98.	Oct 1966	Milan Professional Championships (4-man), Italy	?	(Spain) Andrés Gimeno	4–6, 6–1, 9–7
46.	99.	Oct 1966	South African Professional Championships, Johannesburg (3)	Hard	(Spain) Andrés Gimeno	6–4, 6–2
47.	100.	Oct 1966	Western Cape Province Professional Championships, Cape Town, South Africa (3)	?	(Australia) Ken Rosewall	5–7, 6–4, 7–5
48.	101.	Oct 1966	Natal Professional Championships, Durban, South Africa	Hard	(Spain) Andrés Gimeno	6–1 6–3
49.	102.	Nov 1966	Abidjan Professional Championships (4-man), Ivory Coast	?	(Spain) Andrés Gimeno	2–6, 6–4, 6–0
50.	103.	Nov 1966	Dakar Professional Championships (4-man), Senegal	?	(Spain) Andrés Gimeno	2–6, 6–1, 9–7
51.	104.	Mar 1967	New York Pro Championships, New York City (2)	Wood (i)	(United States) Pancho Gonzales	7–5, 14–16, 7–5, 6–2
52.	105.	Mar 1967	San Juan Pro Championships, Puerto Rico	?	(Spain) Andrés Gimeno	6–4, 3–6, 6–1
53.	106.	Mar 1967	Orlando Professional Championships, Florida, US	?	(United States) Pancho Gonzales	6–4, 2–6, 6–0
54.	107.	Mar 1967	Planters Pro Challenge Cup, Miami Beach, Florida, US	Hard	(Spain) Andrés Gimeno	6–3, 6–3
55.	108.	Mar 1967	Boston Garden Pro Championships, Boston, US	Uniturf (i)	(Australia) Ken Rosewall	6–4, 6–0
56.	109.	Mar 1967	Montreal Canadian Professional Championships, Canada	?	(United States) Dennis Ralston	17–15 6–0
57.	110.	Apr 1967	Paris Pro Championships, France	?	(Australia) Ken Rosewall	6–0, 10–8, 10–8
58.	111.	Apr 1967	Marseille Professional Championships (4-man), France (2)	?	(United States) Dennis Ralston	6–4, 6–3
59.	112.	May 1967	Pacific Professional Championships, San Diego, California, US	?	(United States) Dennis Ralston	6–4, 12–10
60.	113.	Jun 1967	Madison Square Garden Professional Championships, New York City, US	?	(Australia) Ken Rosewall	6–4, 6–4
61.	114.	Jun 1967	World Professional Championships, Oklahoma City, Oklahoma, US (2)	?	(Australia) Ken Rosewall	6–2, 3–6, 6–4
62.	115.	Jul 1967	U.S. Professional Championships, Chestnut Hill, Massachusetts, US (3)	Grass	(Spain) Andrés Gimeno	4–6, 6–4, 6–3, 7–5
63.	116.	Jul 1967	Newport Professional Championships (round robin), Rhode Island, US (2)	Grass	(Spain) Andrés Gimeno (2nd)	N/A
64.	117.	Jul 1967	Binghamton Pro Championships, Binghamton, US (2)	?	(Spain) Andrés Gimeno	6–1, 6–3
65.	118.	Aug 1967	Colonial Professional Championships, Fort Worth, Texas, US	?	(United States) Dennis Ralston	8–6, 6–0
66.	119.	Aug 1967	Wimbledon World Professional Championships, London	Grass	(Australia) Ken Rosewall	6–2, 6–2, 12–10
67.	120.	Sep 1967	Johannesburg Professional Championships, South Africa (4)	Hard	(Australia) Ken Rosewall	6–1, 8–6
68.	121.	Oct 1967	French Professional Championships, Paris	?	(Spain) Andrés Gimeno	6–4, 8–6, 4–6, 6–2
69.	122.	Oct 1967	London Professional Championships, Wembley Arena, London (4)	Wood (i)	(Australia) Ken Rosewall	2–6, 6–1, 1–6, 8–6, 6–2
70.	123	Mar 1968	*NTL Sao Paulo Pro Championships, Brazil	?	(United States) Pancho Gonzales	6–2, 3–6, 7–5
71.	124.	Mar 1968	NTL Buenos Aires Pro Championships, Argentina	?	(United States) Pancho Gonzales	7–5, 5–7, 6–4
72.	125.	Apr 1968	*BBC2 World Pro Invitation Championships (4-man), London	Carpet	(Australia) Ken Rosewall	6–3, 10–8

- * 3 titles listed by the ATP website

==== Professional: Open Era (75 titles) ====
Era total	Career (total)	Date	Tournament Name and Location	Surface	Opponent	Score
1.	126.	Apr 1968	NTL Professional Championships, London	Hard (i)	(Australia) Ken Rosewall	6–0, 6–1, 6–0
2.	127.	May 1968	Madison Square Garden Professional Championships, New York City (2)	Carpet (i)	(Australia) Ken Rosewall	4–6, 6–3, 9–7, 6–4
3.	128.	Jun 1968 (Note: The final was postponed due to rain and as the players had to leave for England to play tournaments, including Wimbledon, it was rescheduled and played on 10 September.)	U.S. Pro Tennis Championships, Boston, Massachusetts, US (4)	Grass	(Australia) John Newcombe	6–4, 6–4, 9–7
4.	129.	Jun 1968	Wimbledon, London (3)	Grass	(Australia) Tony Roche	6–3, 6–4, 6–2
5.	130.	Jul 1968	French Professional Championships, Paris (2)	Clay	(Australia) John Newcombe	6–2, 6–2, 6–3
6.	131.	Sep 1968	Pacific Southwest Open, Los Angeles	Hard	(Australia) Ken Rosewall	4–6, 6–0, 6–0
7.	132.	Oct 1968	NTL South Texas, Corpus Christi, US	Hard	(Spain) Andrés Gimeno	6–2, 6–4
8.	133.	Nov 1968	São Paulo, Brazil (4-man round robin)	Clay (i)	Round-robin (Note: Andrés Gimeno, Fred Stolle, Roy Emerson finished tied for second)	won RR 3–0
9.	134.	Nov 1968	La Paz, Bolivia (4-man round robin)	Clay	Round-robin	won RR 3–0
10.	135.	Dec 1968	Dixie Tennis Classic, Vanderbilt University, Nashville (4-man)	Wood (i)	(Australia) Ken Rosewall	6–2, 6–3
11.	136.	Jan 1969	Australian Open, Brisbane (3)	Grass	(Spain) Andrés Gimeno	6–3, 6–4, 7–5
12.	137.	Feb 1969	U.S. Professional Indoor, Philadelphia, US	Carpet (i)	(Australia) Tony Roche	7–5, 6–4, 6–4
13.	138.	Feb 1969	Orlando Professional Championships, Florida, US (Note: Not listed by the ATP.) (2)	Clay	(Australia) Ken Rosewall	6–3, 6–2
14.	139.	Mar 1969	Los Angeles Professional Championships, US (2)	Carpet (i)	(United States) Marty Riessen	6–4, 10–8
15.	140.	Mar 1969	South African Open, Johannesburg	Hard	(Netherlands) Tom Okker	6–3, 10–8, 6–3
16.	141.	Apr 1969	Anaheim Pro Invitational, Anaheim, California, US	Carpet (i)	(United States) Ronald Holmberg	31–16, 31–28
17.	142.	May 1969	Madison Square Garden Invitational, New York City (3)	Carpet (i)	(Australia) Roy Emerson	6–2, 4–6, 6–1
18.	143.	May 1969	BBC2 World Professional Championship, Wembley Arena, London	Carpet	(Australia) Ken Rosewall	8–6, 6–0
19.	144.	May 1969	French Open, Paris (2)	Clay	(Australia) Ken Rosewall	6–4, 6–3, 6–4
20.	145.	Jun 1969	Wimbledon, London (4)	Grass	(Australia) John Newcombe	6–4, 5–7, 6–4, 6–4
21.	146.	Jul 1969	U.S. Pro Tennis Championships, Boston, Massachusetts, US (5)	Hard	(Australia) John Newcombe	7–5, 6–2, 4–6, 6–1
22.	147.	Aug 1969	Saint Louis Professional Championships, Missouri, US	?	(Australia) Fred Stolle	7–5, 3–6, 7–5
23.	148.	Aug 1969	Fort Worth Professional Championships, Fort Worth, Texas, US (2)	Hard	(Australia) Ken Rosewall	6–3, 6–2
24.	149.	Aug 1969	Binghamton Professional Championships, New York, US (3)	?	(United States) Pancho Gonzales	6–1, 6–2
25.	150.	Aug 1969	Baltimore Professional Championships, Maryland, US (3)	Carpet (i)	(United States) Pancho Gonzales	6–3, 3–6, 7–5, 4–6, 8–6
26.	151.	Aug 1969	US Open, New York City (2)	Grass	(Australia) Tony Roche	7–9, 6–1, 6–2, 6–2
27.	152.	Nov 1969	British Covered Court Championships, London (2)	Carpet (i)	(Australia) Tony Roche	6–4, 6–1, 6–3
28.	153.	Dec 1969	Madrid Professional Championships, Spain	?	(United Kingdom) Roger Taylor	6–3, 6–2
29.	154.	Feb 1970	U.S. Pro Indoor Philadelphia, US (2)	Carpet	(Australia) Tony Roche	6–3, 8–6, 6–2
30.	155.	Mar 1970	Dunlop Slazenger International WCT, Sydney	Grass	(Australia) Ken Rosewall	3–6, 6–2, 3–6, 6–2, 6–3
31.	156.	Mar 1970	South African Open, Johannesburg (2)	Hard	(South Africa) Frew McMillan	4–6, 6–2, 6–1, 6–2
32.	157.	May 1970	Rawlings Classic WCT, Saint Louis, Missouri, US (2)	Carpet	(Australia) Ken Rosewall	6–1, 6–4
33.	158.	Jun 1970	Rothman's Open, Queen's Club, London (2)	Grass	(Australia) John Newcombe	6–4, 6–3
34.	159.	Jul 1970	Tennis Champions Classic, New York	?	(Australia) Ken Rosewall	6–4, 6–3, 6–3
35.	160.	Jul 1970	First National Classic, Louisville, Kentucky, US	Clay	(Australia) John Newcombe	6–3, 6–3
36.	161.	Aug 1970	Bretton Woods (4-man), US	Clay	(Australia) Roy Emerson	6–3, 6–3
37.	162.	Aug 1970	Rothman's Canadian Open, Toronto	Clay	(United Kingdom) Roger Taylor	6–0, 4–6, 6–3
38.	163.	Aug 1970	National Invitation Tournament WCT, Fort Worth, Texas, US (3)	Hard	(Australia) Roy Emerson	6–3, 7–5
39.	164.	Aug 1970	Marlboro Open, South Orange, New Jersey, US (2)	Grass	(Australia) Bob Carmichael	6–4, 6–2, 6–2
40.	165.	Sep 1970	Pacific Southwest Open, Los Angeles, US (2)	Hard	(Australia) John Newcombe	4–6, 6–4, 7–6^{(7–5)}
41.	166.	Sep 1970	Rothman's International WCT, Vancouver, Canada	Carpet	(Australia) Roy Emerson	6–2, 6–1, 6–2
42.	167.	Oct 1970	Berlin, Bonn, Germany (4-man round robin)	Carpet	(Netherlands) Tom Okker (2nd)	N/A
43.	168.	Nov 1970	Wembley Championships, London, U.K. (5)	Carpet	(United States) Cliff Richey	6–3, 6–4, 7–5
44.	169.	Feb 1971	Rothman's International, London	Hard (i)	(Socialist Federal Republic of Yugoslavia) Nikola Pilić	6–4, 6–0, 6–2
45.	170.	Mar 1971	Tennis Champions Classic, New York (2)	?	(Netherlands) Tom Okker	7–5, 6–2, 6–1
46.	171.	May 1971	Italian Open WCT, Rome (2)	Clay	(Czech Republic) Jan Kodeš	7–5, 6–3, 6–3
47.	172.	Aug 1971	Colonial Championships WCT, Fort Worth, Texas, US (4)	Hard	(United States) Marty Riessen	2–6, 6–4, 3–6, 7–5, 6–3
48.	173.	Aug 1971	CBS Classic (4-man), Hilton Head, South Carolina, US	Clay	(Australia) John Newcombe	6–2, 7–5
49.	174	Aug 1971	Baton Rouge, US	Hard	(Australia) Roy Emerson	6–7, 7–5, 6–1
50.	175.	Sep 1971	Redwood Bank Pacific Coast Open, Berkeley, California, US	Hard	(Australia) Ken Rosewall	6–4, 6–4, 7–6
51.	176.	Nov 1971	Rothman's Open WCT, Bologna, Italy	Carpet	(United States) Arthur Ashe	6–3, 6–4, 6–4
52.	177.	Feb 1972	Richmond WCT, Richmond, US	Carpet	(South Africa) Cliff Drysdale	2–6, 6–3, 7–5, 6–3
53.	178.	Feb 1972	U.S. Pro Indoor, Philadelphia, US	Carpet	(Australia) Ken Rosewall	4–6, 6–2, 6–2, 6–2
54.	179.	Feb 1972	Toronto WCT, Canada	Carpet	(Australia) Ken Rosewall	6–4, 6–1
55.	180.	Apr 1972	Houston WCT, US	Clay	(Australia) Ken Rosewall	6–2, 6–4
56.	181.	Apr 1972	Denver WCT, US	Carpet	(United States) Marty Riessen	4–6, 6–3, 6–4
57.	182.	Jan 1973	Miami WCT, US	Hard	(United States) Dick Stockton	7–6, 6–3, 7–5
58.	183.	Jan 1973	Richmond WCT, Richmond, US	Carpet	(Australia) Roy Emerson	6–4, 6–3
59.	184.	Feb 1973	Toronto WCT, Canada	Carpet	(Australia) Roy Emerson	6–3, 6–4
60.	185.	Mar 1973	Hilton Head CBS Classic, US	Clay	(United States) Stan Smith	6–2, 6–4
61.	186.	Sep 1973	Hilton Head World Invitational Tennis Classic (4-man), US	Hard	(United States) Stan Smith	7–6, 7–5
62.	187.	Oct 1973	Hong Kong	Hard	(United States) Charlie Pasarell	6–3, 3–6, 6–2, 6–2
63.	188.	Nov 1973	Australian Indoor Championships, Sydney, Australia	Hard (i)	(Australia) John Newcombe	3–6, 7–5, 6–3, 3–6, 6–4
64.	189.	Jan 1974	U.S. Pro Indoor, Philadelphia, US	Carpet	(United States) Arthur Ashe	6–1, 6–4, 3–6, 6–4
65.	190.	Mar 1974	Palm Desert WCT, US	Hard	(United States) Roscoe Tanner	6–4, 6–2
66.	191.	Apr 1974	Tokyo WCT, Japan	Hard	(Spain) Juan Gisbert	5–7, 6–2, 6–0
67.	192.	Apr 1974	Houston, US	Clay	(Sweden) Björn Borg	7–6, 6–2
68.	193.	May 1974	Las Vegas WCT, US	Hard	(United States) Marty Riessen	6–2, 6–2
69.	194.	Aug 1974	Bretton Woods, US	Clay	(United States) Harold Solomon	6–4, 6–3
70.	195.	Jan 1975	WCT Puerto Rico CBS Classic, San Juan	Hard	(United States) Arthur Ashe	6–3, 7–5
71.	196.	Feb 1975	La Costa WCT, US	Hard	(Australia) Allan Stone	6–2, 6–2
72.	197.	Mar 1975	São Paulo WCT, Brazil	Carpet	(United States) Charlie Pasarell	6–4, 6–4
73.	198.	Mar 1975	Caracas WCT, Venezuela	Hard	(Mexico) Raúl Ramírez	7–6, 6–2
74.	199.	Mar 1975	Orlando WCT, US	Hard	(United States) Vitas Gerulaitis	6–3, 6–4
75	200.	Jan 1976	Detroit, US	Carpet	(United Kingdom) Mark Cox	6–3, 6–4

Notes and sources for this section

This list of 200 singles titles from 1956 through 1976 may be incomplete.

- Association of Tennis Professionals website
- Collins, Bud; Laver, Rodney George (1973). The Education of a Tennis Player. New York: Simon and Schuster. ISBN 0-671-21533-7.
- International Tennis Federation (1970). BP Yearbook of World Tennis 1970. London. Edited by Barrett, John.
- International Tennis Federation (1971). World of Tennis '71. London. Edited by Barrett, John.
- International Tennis Federation (1972). World of Tennis '72. London. Edited by Barrett, John.
- International Tennis Federation (1973). World of Tennis '73. London. Edited by Barrett, John.
- International Tennis Federation (1974). World of Tennis '74. London. Edited by Barrett, John.
- International Tennis Federation (1975). World of Tennis '75. London. Edited by Barrett, John.
- International Tennis Federation (1976). World of Tennis '76. London. Edited by Barrett, John.
- Laver, Betty (2001). Rod Laver: The Red-headed Rocket from Rockhampton. Gladstone, Qld: Betty Laver. ISBN 0-9579932-0-X.
- McCauley, Joe (2003). The History of Professional Tennis. London.
- Sutter, Michel (1992). Vainqueurs-Winners 1946–1991. Paris. (forewords by Arthur Ashe and Mark Miles).

==== Singles runner-ups during the Open Era (27) ====
As listed on the website of the Association of Tennis Professionals.

Result	No.	Date	Tournament	Surface	Opponent	Score
Loss	1.	Apr 1968	Bournemouth, UK	Clay	(Australia) Ken Rosewall	6–3, 2–6, 0–6, 3–6
Loss	2.	Jun 1968	French Open, Paris	Clay	(Australia) Ken Rosewall	3–6, 1–6, 6–2, 2–6
Loss	3.	Jul 1968	Los Angeles NTL, US	Carpet (i)	(United States) Pancho Gonzales	6–1, 3–6, 4–6
Loss	4.	Nov 1968	Buenos Aires, Argentina	Clay	(Australia) Roy Emerson	7–9, 4–6, 4–6
Loss	5.	Jan 1969	Sydney, Australia	Grass	(Australia) Tony Roche	4–6, 6–4, 7–9, 10–12
Loss	6.	Feb 1969	Auckland, New Zealand	Grass	(Australia) Tony Roche	1–6, 4–6, 6–4, 3–6
Loss	7.	Feb 1969	Hollywood, US	Clay	(Australia) Tony Roche	3–6, 7–9, 4–6
Loss	8.	Feb 1969	Oakland, US	Carpet (i)	(Australia) Tony Roche	6–4, 4–6, 9–11
Loss	9.	Nov 1969	Barcelona, Spain	Clay	(Spain) Andrés Gimeno	8–10, 6–2, 6–3, 4–6, 1–6
Loss	10.	Mar 1970	Los Angeles NTL, US		(United States) Dennis Ralston	5–7, 6–4, 1–6
Loss	11.	May 1970	Las Vegas WCT, US	Hard	(United States) Pancho Gonzales	1–6, 5–7, 7–5, 3–6
Loss	12.	Jun 1970	Bristol, UK	Grass	(Socialist Federal Republic of Yugoslavia) Nikola Pilić	3–6, 6–1, 3–6
Loss	13.	Jul 1970	Dublin, Ireland	Grass	(Australia) Tony Roche	3–6, 1–6
Loss	14.	Aug 1970	Boston, US	Hard	(Australia) Tony Roche	6–3, 4–6, 2–6, 2–6
Loss	15.	Oct 1970	Barcelona, Spain	Clay	(Spain) Manuel Santana	4–6, 3–6, 4–6
Loss	16.	Dec 1970	Masters, Tokyo	Carpet	(United States) Stan Smith	6–4, 3–6, 4–6
Loss	17.	Feb 1971	Philadelphia WCT, US	Carpet	(Australia) John Newcombe	6–7^{(5–7)}, 6–7^{(1–7)}, 4–6
Loss	18.	Apr 1971	Miami WCT, US	Hard	(South Africa) Cliff Drysdale	2–6, 4–6, 6–3, 4–6
Loss	19.	Aug 1971	Quebec WCT, Canada	Hard	(Netherlands) Tom Okker	3–6, 6–7, 7–6, 1–6
Loss	20.	Oct 1971	Wembley, UK	Hard (i)	(Romania) Ilie Năstase	6–3, 3–6, 6–3, 4–6, 4–6
Loss	21.	Nov 1971	Dallas, US	Carpet	(Australia) Ken Rosewall	4–6, 6–1, 6–7^{(3–7)}, 6–7^{(4–7)}
Loss	22.	Apr 1972	Quebec WCT, Canada	hard	(United States) Marty Riessen	5–7, 2–6, 5–7
Loss	23.	May 1972	Dallas WCT, US	Carpet	(Australia) Ken Rosewall	6–4, 0–6, 3–6, 7–6^{(7–3)}, 6–7^{(5–7)}
Loss	24.	Mar 1973	Atlanta WCT, US	Clay	(United States) Stan Smith	3–6, 4–6
Loss	25.	Apr 1973	St. Louis WCT, US	Carpet	(United States) Stan Smith	4–6, 6–3, 4–6
Loss	26.	Apr 1973	Brussels WCT, Belgium	Carpet	(United States) Stan Smith	2–6, 4–6, 1–6
Loss	27.	Nov 1974	Hilton Head, US	Clay	(Romania) Ilie Năstase	7–5, 6–7, 4–6

=== Doubles Open Era (28 titles / 14 runner-ups) ===
Result	W–L	Date	Tournament	Surface	Partner	Opponents	Score
Loss	0–1	Jun 1968	French Open, Paris	Clay	(Australia) Roy Emerson	(Australia) Ken Rosewall (Australia) Fred Stolle	3–6, 4–6, 3–6
Win	1–1	Apr 1968	Bournemouth, UK	Grass	(Australia) Roy Emerson	(Spain) Andrés Gimeno (United States) Pancho Gonzales	8–6, 4–6, 6–3, 6–2
Win	2–1	Jan 1969	Australian Open, Melbourne	Grass	(Australia) Roy Emerson	(Australia) Ken Rosewall (Australia) Fred Stolle	6–4, 6–4
Loss	2–2	Jun 1969	French Open, Paris	Clay	(Australia) Roy Emerson	(Australia) John Newcombe (Australia) Tony Roche	6–4, 1–6, 6–3, 4–6, 4–6
Win	3–2	Nov 1969	Stockholm, Sweden	Hard (i)	(Australia) Roy Emerson	(Spain) Andrés Gimeno (Australia) Fred Stolle	6–4, 6–2
Loss	3–3	Jun 1970	St. Louis WCT, US	Carpet	(Australia) Roy Emerson	(Spain) Andrés Gimeno (Australia) John Newcombe	4–6, 2–6
Win	4–3	Aug 1970	Boston, US	Hard	(Australia) Roy Emerson	(United Arab Republic) Ismail El Shafei (Denmark) Torben Ulrich	6–1, 7–6
Loss	4–4	Aug 1970	Louisville, US	Hard	(Australia) Roy Emerson	(Australia) John Newcombe (Australia) Tony Roche	6–8, 7–5, 4–6
Loss	4–5	Sep 1970	South Orange, US	Hard	(Spain) Andrés Gimeno	(Chile) Patricio Cornejo (Chile) Jaime Fillol	6–3, 6–7, 6–7
Loss	4–6	Sep 1970	US Open, New York City	Grass	(Australia) Roy Emerson	(France) Pierre Barthès (Socialist Federal Republic of Yugoslavia) Nikola Pilić	7–5, 4–6, 2–6, 6–7
Loss	4–7	Apr 1971	Miami WCT, US	Hard	(Australia) Roy Emerson	(Australia) John Newcombe (Australia) Tony Roche	6–7, 6–7
Win	5–7	Jul 1971	Wimbledon, London	Grass	(Australia) Roy Emerson	(United States) Arthur Ashe (United States) Dennis Ralston	4–6, 9–7, 6–8, 6–4, 6–4
Win	6–7	Aug 1971	Quebec WCT, Canada	Carpet (i)	(Australia) Roy Emerson	(Netherlands) Tom Okker (United States) Marty Riessen	7–6, 6–3
Win	7–7	Aug 1971	Boston WCT, US	Hard	(Australia) Roy Emerson	(Netherlands) Tom Okker (United States) Marty Riessen	6–4, 6–4
Win	8–7	Oct 1971	Berkeley, US	Hard	(Australia) Roy Emerson	(Australia) Ken Rosewall (Australia) Fred Stolle	6–3, 6–3
Win	9–7	Oct 1971	Vancouver WCT, Canada	Outdoor	(Australia) Roy Emerson	(Australia) John Alexander (Australia) Phil Dent	5–7, 6–7, 6–0, 7–5, 7–6
Loss	9–8	Oct 1971	Cologne WCT, Germany	Carpet	(Australia) Roy Emerson	(Netherlands) Tom Okker (United States) Marty Riessen	7–6, 6–3, 6–7, 3–6, 4–6
Win	10–8	Apr 1972	Houston WCT, US	Clay	(Australia) Roy Emerson	(Australia) Ken Rosewall (Australia) Fred Stolle	6–3, 6–3
Win	11–8	May 1972	Las Vegas WCT, US	Hard	(Australia) Roy Emerson	(Australia) John Newcombe (Australia) Tony Roche	w.o.
Loss	11–9	Feb 1972	Toronto WCT, Canada	Carpet	(Australia) Roy Emerson	(Australia) Bob Carmichael (Australia) Ray Ruffels	4–6, 6–4, 4–6
Loss	11–10	Mar 1972	Miami WCT, US	Hard	(Australia) Roy Emerson	(Netherlands) Tom Okker (United States) Marty Riessen	5–7, 4–6
Loss	11–11	Mar 1972	Chicago WCT, US	Carpet	(Australia) Roy Emerson	(Netherlands) Tom Okker (United States) Marty Riessen	2–6, 3–6
Win	12–11	Jan 1973	Miami WCT, US	Hard	(Australia) Roy Emerson	(Australia) Terry Addison (Australia) Colin Dibley	6–4, 6–4
Win	13–11	Jan 1973	La Costa WCT, US	Hard	(Australia) Roy Emerson	(Socialist Federal Republic of Yugoslavia) Nikola Pilić (Australia) Allan Stone	6–7, 6–3, 6–4
Win	14–11	Feb 1973	Richmond WCT, US	Carpet	(Australia) Roy Emerson	(Australia) Terry Addison (Australia) Colin Dibley	3–6, 6–3, 6–4
Loss	14–12	Feb 1973	Philadelphia WCT, US	Carpet	(Australia) Roy Emerson	(United States) Brian Gottfried (United States) Dick Stockton	6–4, 3–6, 4–6
Loss	14–13	Feb 1973	Toronto WCT, Canada	Carpet	(Australia) Roy Emerson	(Australia) John Alexander (Australia) Phil Dent	6–3, 4–6, 4–6, 2–6
Win	15–14	Mar 1973	Atlanta WCT, US	Clay	(Australia) Roy Emerson	(South Africa) Robert Maud (Rhodesia) Andrew Pattison	7–6, 6–3
Win	16–14	Apr 1973	Gothenburg WCT, Sweden	Carpet	(Australia) Roy Emerson	(Socialist Federal Republic of Yugoslavia) Nikola Pilić (Australia) Allan Stone	6–7, 6–4, 6–1
Win	17–14	Jul 1973	Bretton Woods, US	Clay	(Australia) Fred Stolle	(Australia) Bob Carmichael (South Africa) Frew McMillan	7–6, 4–6, 7–5
Win	18–14	Aug 1973	Toronto, Canada	Hard	(Australia) Ken Rosewall	(Australia) Owen Davidson (Australia) John Newcombe	7–5, 7–6
Loss	11–14	Sep 1973	US Open, New York City	Grass	(Australia) Ken Rosewall	(Australia) Owen Davidson (Australia) John Newcombe	5–7, 6–2, 5–7, 5–7
Win	19–14	Oct 1973	Tehran, Iran	Clay	(Australia) John Newcombe	(Australia) Ross Case (Australia) Geoff Masters	7–6, 6–2
Win	20–14	Nov 1973	Hong Kong	Hard	(Australia) Colin Dibley	(United States) Paul Gerken (United States) Brian Gottfried	6–3, 5–7, 17–15
Win	21–14	Nov 1973	Sydney, Australia	Hard (i)	(Australia) John Newcombe	(Australia) Mal Anderson (Australia) Ken Rosewall	7–6, 6–2
Win	22–14	Apr 1974	Houston, US	Clay	(Australia) Colin Dibley	(United States) Arthur Ashe (United States) Roscoe Tanner	4–6, 7–6, 6–4
Win	23–14	May 1974	Las Vegas, Nevada, US	Hard	(Australia) Roy Emerson	(South Africa) Frew McMillan (Australia) John Newcombe	6–7, 6–4, 6–4
Win	24–14	Aug 1974	Bretton Woods, US	Clay	(United States) Jeff Borowiak	(France) Georges Goven (France) François Jauffret	6–3, 6–2
Win	25–14	Apr 1975	Denver WCT, US	Carpet	(Australia) Roy Emerson	(Australia) Bob Carmichael (Australia) Allan Stone	6–2, 3–6, 7–5
Win	26–14	Feb 1976	Philadelphia WCT, US	Carpet (i)	(United States) Dennis Ralston	(South Africa) Bob Hewitt (South Africa) Frew McMillan	7–6^{(8–6)}, 7–6^{(7–3)}
Win	27–14	Feb 1976	Rotterdam WCT, Netherlands	Carpet	(South Africa) Frew McMillan	(United States) Arthur Ashe (Netherlands) Tom Okker	6–1, 6–7, 7–6
Win	28–14	Apr 1976	Houston WCT, US	Clay	(Australia) Ken Rosewall	(United States) Charlie Pasarell (Australia) Allan Stone	6–4, 6–2

== Davis Cup ==
Laver won 16 out of 20 Davis Cup singles matches and all four of his doubles. Laver was a member of the victorious Australian Davis Cup teams in 1959, 1960, 1961, 1962 and 1973.

Zone	Round	Date	Opponents	Tie score	Location	Surface	Match	Opponent	W–L	Rubber score
1959 Davis Cup
NCA	SF	18–20 Jul 1959	Mexico	4–1	Mexico City	Clay	Singles 2	Mario Llamas	L	4–6, 4–6, 3–6
NCA	SF	18–20 Jul 1959	Mexico	4–1	Mexico City	Clay	Singles 4	Tony Palafox	W	6–3, 6–8, 4–6, 7–5, 6–3
NCA	F	24–26 Jul 1959	Canada	5–0	Montreal	Grass	Singles 2	Robert Bedard	W	8–6, 6–3, 6–4
NCA	F	24–26 Jul 1959	Canada	5–0	Montreal	Grass	Singles 5	François Godbout	W	7–9, 6–4, 6–2, 6–1
AIZ	F	31 Jul–2 Aug 1959	Cuba	5–0	Montreal	Grass	Doubles (Emerson)	Orlando Garrido; Reynaldo Garrido	W	6–4, 6–4, 6–4
IZ	SF	7–10 Jul 1959	Italy	4–1	Philadelphia	Grass	Singles 1	Nicola Pietrangeli	W	6–4, 2–6, 6–3, 6–3
IZ	SF	7–10 Jul 1959	Italy	4–1	Philadelphia	Grass	Singles 4	Orlando Sirola	W	4–6, 6–4, 6–0, 6–3
IZ	F	14–16 Aug 1959	India	4–1	Boston	Grass	Singles 1	Ramanathan Krishnan	L	1–6, 4–6, 10–8, 4–6
IZ	F	14–16 Aug 1959	India	4–1	Boston	Grass	Singles 4	Premjit Lall	W	6–2, 10–8, 6–4
CR	F	28–31 Aug 1959	United States	3–2	New York City	Grass	Singles 1	Barry MacKay (tennis)	L	5–7, 4–6, 1–6
CR	F	28–31 Aug 1959	United States	3–2	New York City	Grass	Singles 4	Alex Olmedo	L	7–9, 6–4, 8–10, 10–12
1960 Davis Cup
CR	F	26–28 Dec 1960	Italy	4–1	Sydney	Grass	Singles 2	Nicola Pietrangeli	W	8–6, 6–4, 6–3
CR	F	26–28 Dec 1960	Italy	4–1	Sydney	Grass	Singles 4	Orlando Sirola	W	9–7, 6–2, 6–3
1961 Davis Cup
CR	F	26–28 Dec 1961	Italy	5–0	Melbourne	Grass	Singles 2	Orlando Sirola	W	6–1, 6–4, 6–3
CR	F	26–28 Dec 1961	Italy	5–0	Melbourne	Grass	Singles 4	Nicola Pietrangeli	W	6–3, 3–6, 4–6, 6–3, 8–6
1962 Davis Cup
CR	F	26–28 Dec 1962	Mexico	5–0	Brisbane	Grass	Singles 1	Rafael Osuna	W	6–2, 6–1, 7–5
CR	F	26–28 Dec 1962	Mexico	5–0	Brisbane	Grass	Doubles (Emerson)	Rafael Osuna; Tony Palafox	W	7–5, 6–2, 6–4
CR	F	26–28 Dec 1962	Mexico	5–0	Brisbane	Grass	Singles 5	Tony Palafox	W	6–1, 4–6, 6–4, 8–6
1973 Davis Cup
IZ	SF	16–18 Nov 1973	Czechoslovakia	4–1	Melbourne	Grass	Singles 1	Jan Kodeš	W	6–3, 7–5, 7–5
IZ	SF	16–18 Nov 1973	Czechoslovakia	4–1	Melbourne	Grass	Doubles (Rosewall)	Jan Kodeš; Vladimir Zednik	W	6–4, 14–12, 7–9, 8–6
IZ	SF	16–18 Nov 1973	Czechoslovakia	4–1	Melbourne	Grass	Singles 4	Jiří Hřebec	W	6–1, 4–6, 6–4, 8–6
CR	F	30 Nov–2 Dec 1973	United States	5–0	Cleveland	Carpet (i)	Singles 2	Tom Gorman	W	8–10, 8–6, 6–8, 6–3, 6–1
CR	F	30 Nov–2 Dec 1973	United States	5–0	Cleveland	Carpet (i)	Doubles (Newcombe)	Stan Smith; Erik van Dillen	W	6–1, 6–2, 6–4
CR	F	30 Nov–2 Dec 1973	United States	5–0	Cleveland	Carpet (i)	Singles 5	Stan Smith	W	6–3, 6–4, 3–6, 6–2

== See also ==
- Laver–Rosewall rivalry
