= List of tennis title leaders in the Open Era =

This article lists the tennis players who have won the most tour-level professional tournament titles since the Open Era began in 1968. The current top-level events are on the ATP Tour for men and the WTA Tour for women.

As of 2026, Martina Navratilova has won an Open Era record 354 career titles: 167 singles, 177 doubles, and 10 mixed doubles. Her singles and doubles victories are also the most by any player. The most titles by a male is 155 by John McEnroe: 77 in singles, 77 in doubles and 1 in mixed doubles. Jimmy Connors holds the record for most career men's singles tournament titles in the Open Era with 109.

== Singles titles ==
=== Men's singles leaders ===
Currently active players

Player	Titles
(United States) Jimmy Connors	109
(Switzerland) Roger Federer	103
(Serbia) Novak Djokovic	102
(Czech Republic) (United States) Ivan Lendl	94
(Spain) Rafael Nadal	92
(United States) John McEnroe	77
(Australia) Rod Laver	72
(Sweden) Björn Borg	66
(Romania) Ilie Năstase	64
(United States) Pete Sampras	64
(Argentina) Guillermo Vilas	62
(United States) Andre Agassi	60
(Germany) Boris Becker	49
(United States) Stan Smith	48
(United Kingdom) Andy Murray	46
(United States) Arthur Ashe	45
(Austria) Thomas Muster	44
(Sweden) Stefan Edberg (Note: Tennis was a demonstration event at the 1984 Olympics, therefore doesn't count towards Edberg's total.)	41
(Australia) John Newcombe	41
(Australia) Ken Rosewall	40
Minimum 40 titles (correct as of Oct 2026)

Open Era title leaders composition

=== Women's singles leaders ===
Currently active players

Player	Titles
(Czechoslovakia) (United States) Martina Navratilova	167
(United States) Chris Evert	157
(West Germany) Steffi Graf	107
(Australia) Margaret Court	92
(United States) Serena Williams	73
(Australia) Evonne Goolagong	68
(United States) Billie Jean King	67
(United Kingdom) Virginia Wade	55
(United States) Lindsay Davenport	55
(Socialist Federal Republic of Yugoslavia) (United States) Monica Seles	53
(United States) Venus Williams	49
(Belgium) Justine Henin	43
(Switzerland) Martina Hingis	43
(Belgium) Kim Clijsters	41
minimum 40 titles (correct as of Dec 2025)

== Overall titles (singles & doubles) ==
=== Men leaders ===
Currently active players

Player	Singles	Doubles	Mixed	Total	Span
(United States) John McEnroe	77	77	1	155	1977–06
(United States) Mike Bryan	0	124	4	128	1998–20
(United States) Bob Bryan	0	119	7	126	1998–20
(United States) Jimmy Connors	109	16	0	125	1972–96
(Switzerland) Roger Federer	103	8	0	111	1998–22
(Romania) Ilie Năstase	64	45	2	111	1968–89
(United States) Stan Smith	49	56	0	105	1968–86
(Spain) Rafael Nadal	92	11	0	103	2001–24
(Serbia) Novak Djokovic	102	1	0	103	2003–
(Australia) Rod Laver	72	28	0	100	1968–79
(Czechoslovakia) (United States) Ivan Lendl	94	6	0	100	1978–94
(Netherlands) Tom Okker	35	68	0	103	1968–82
(Canada) Daniel Nestor	0	91	4	95	1991–18
(Australia) Todd Woodbridge	2	83	6	91	1988–05
(Mexico) Raúl Ramírez	19	60	0	79	1973–83
(United States) Brian Gottfried	25	54	0	79	1972–85
(Argentina) Guillermo Vilas	62	16	0	78	1968–92
(South Africa) Bob Hewitt	7	65	6	78	1968–83
(Australia) Mark Woodforde	4	67	5	76	1984–00
(Australia) John Newcombe	41	33	0	74	1968–83
(South Africa) Frew McMillan	2	63	5	70	1968–83
(Sweden) Björn Borg	66	4	0	70	1973–93
(United States) Marty Riessen	9	53	7	69	1968–81
(Poland) Wojtek Fibak	15	52	0	67	1973–89
(Sweden) Anders Järryd	8	59	0	67	1980–96
(United States) Pete Sampras	64	2	0	66	1988–02
(India) Leander Paes	1	54	10	65	1991–21
(Spain) Emilio Sánchez	15	50	0	65	1984–97
(Czechoslovakia) Tomáš Šmíd	9	55	0	64	1976–92
(Germany) Boris Becker	49	15	0	64	1984–99
(United States) Peter Fleming	3	60	0	63	1973–88
(United States) Andre Agassi	60	1	0	61	1986–06
(Sweden) Jonas Björkman	6	54	0	60	1991–08
(India) Mahesh Bhupathi	0	52	8	60	1995–16
(Sweden) Stefan Edberg	41	18	0	59	1983–96
(Serbia and Montenegro) (Serbia) Nenad Zimonjić	0	54	5	59	1995–21
(United States) Arthur Ashe	45	14	0	59	1968–79
(Belarus) Max Mirnyi	1	52	5	58	1996–18
(Spain) Manuel Orantes	34	22	0	56	1968–83
(The Bahamas) Mark Knowles	0	55	1	56	1992–12
(Netherlands) Paul Haarhuis	1	54	0	55	1989–03
(Australia) Ken Rosewall	40	14	0	54	1968–80
(United States) Sherwood Stewart	1	51	2	54	1968–85
(Ecuador) Andrés Gómez	21	33	0	54	1979–95
(United States) Robert Lutz	11	43	0	54	1968–85
(Russia) Yevgeny Kafelnikov	26	27	0	53	1992–03
(United States) Rick Leach	0	46	4	50	1987–06
(United Kingdom) Andy Murray	46	3	0	49	2005–24
(Spain) Sergio Casal	1	47	1	49	1981–95
(Netherlands) Jacco Eltingh	4	44	0	48	1988–98
(Croatia) Mate Pavić	0	43	3	46	2011–
(Austria) Thomas Muster	44	1	0	45	1985–99
(Brazil) Marcelo Melo	0	42	0	42	1998–
(France) Nicolas Mahut	4	37	0	41	2000–25
(Australia) Tony Roche	21	18	1	40	1968–78
(Australia) Mark Edmondson	6	34	0	40	1975–88
(Sweden) Mats Wilander	33	7	0	40	1981–96
(Czech Republic) Martin Damm	0	40	0	40	1990–11
(United Kingdom) Jamie Murray	0	34	5	39	2004–26
(Hungary) Balázs Taróczy	13	26	0	39	1972–90
(France) Yannick Noah	23	16	0	39	1977–96
(France) Guy Forget	11	28	0	39	1982–00
(Romania) Horia Tecău	0	38	1	39	2003–22
(Brazil) Bruno Soares	0	35	3	38	2001–22
(Australia) John Fitzgerald	6	30	2	38	1988–03
(Netherlands) Jean-Julien Rojer	0	37	1	38	2003–
(Australia) Patrick Galbraith	0	36	2	38	1989–99
(Switzerland) Heinz Günthardt	5	30	2	37	1976–90
(Spain) Marcel Granollers	4	33	0	37	2003–
(United States) Rajeev Ram	2	32	2	36	2004–2026
(United States) Andy Roddick	32	4	0	36	2000–15
(United States) Ken Flach	0	34	2	36	1983–96
(Czech Republic) Cyril Suk	0	32	4	36	1988–06
(Czech Republic) Pavel Složil	2	32	1	35	–86
(United States) Vitas Gerulaitis	26	9	0	35	1968–89
(Australia) John Alexander	7	28	0	35	1969–85
(Zimbabwe) Kevin Ullyett	0	34	1	35	1990–10
(Croatia) Nikola Mektić	0	34	1	35	2006–
(United States) Michael Chang	34	0	0	34	1988–03
(South Africa) Kevin Curren	6	25	3	34	1979–93
(Australia) Lleyton Hewitt	30	3	0	33	1998–20
(Australia) John Peers	0	30	3	33	2011–
(Croatia) Goran Ivanisevic	22	9	0	31	1988–04
(France) Fabrice Santoro	6	24	1	31	1989–10
(Australia) Jared Palmer	1	28	2	31	1991–05
(France) Michaël Llodra	5	26	0	31	1999–14
(Australia) Kim Warwick	3	26	2	31	1970–87
(Italy) Jannik Sinner	30	1	0	31	2018–
(France) Édouard Roger-Vasselin	0	30	1	31	2002–
(Spain) Carlos Alcaraz	30	0	0	30	2018–
(Czech Republic) David Rikl	0	30	0	30	1989–05
(Spain) Javier Sánchez Vicario	4	26	0	30	1986–00
(Croatia) Ivan Dodig	1	24	4	29	2004–25
(Germany) Alexander Zverev	26	3	0	29	2013–
(United States) Jim Courier	23	6	0	29	1988–00
(Spain) David Ferrer	27	2	0	29	2000–19
(India) Vijay Amritraj	15	14	0	29	1970–93
(United States) Robert Seguso	0	29	0	29	1983–99
(United States) Gene Mayer	14	15	0	29	1973–86
(Argentina) Horacio Zeballos	1	28	0	29	2003–
(Brazil) Gustavo Kuerten	20	8	0	28	1995–08
(Italy) Adriano Panatta	10	18	0	28	1969–83
(Germany) Michael Stich	18	10	0	28	1988–97
(Australia) Phil Dent	3	25	0	28	1967–83
(United States) Jim Pugh	1	22	5	28	1985–96
(United States) Roscoe Tanner	15	13	0	28	1973–86
(Poland) Łukasz Kubot	0	27	0	27	2002–23
(India) Rohan Bopanna	0	26	1	27	2003–25
(United States) Paul McNamee	2	24	1	27	1973–88
(Romania) Ion Țiriac	5	22	0	27	1958–79
(Chile) Hans Gildemeister	4	23	0	27	1973–87
(Argentina) José Luis Clerc	25	2	0	27	1977–95
(Czech Republic) Jan Kodeš	9	17	0	26	1968–83
(Chile) Jaime Fillol	9	16	1	26	1968–85
(South Africa) Wayne Ferreira	15	11	0	26	1989–05
(Australia) Paul Hanley	0	26	0	26	1997–14
(United States) / (New Zealand) Michael Venus	0	25	0	25	2009–
(Finland) Henri Kontinen	0	24	1	25	2008–21
(Czech Republic) Jiří Novák	7	18	0	25	1993–07
(Switzerland) Jakob Hlasek	5	20	0	25	1983–96
(United States) Scott Davis	3	22	0	25	1983–98
(United States) Jim Grabb	2	23	0	25	1986–00
(Spain) Tomás Carbonell	2	22	1	25	1987–01
(Czech Republic) Daniel Vacek	0	25	0	25	1990–03
(Russia) Daniil Medvedev	25	0	0	25	2014-
minimum 25 overall titles (correct as of February 2026)

=== Women leaders ===
Currently active players

Player	Singles	Doubles	Mixed	Total	Span
(Czechoslovakia) (United States) Martina Navratilova	167	177	10	354	1975–06
(United States) Chris Evert	157	32	0	189	1972–89
(Australia) Margaret Court	92	48	7	147	1968–77
(United States) Pam Shriver	21	111	1	133	1979–97
(United States) Rosemary Casals	11	112	3	126	1968–91
(Germany) Steffi Graf	107	11	0	118	1982–99
(Switzerland) Martina Hingis	43	64	7	114	1994–17
(Czech Republic) Jana Novotná	24	76	4	104	1987–99
(Spain) A. Sánchez Vicario	29	69	4	102	1985–02
(United States) Billie Jean King	78	16	7	101	1968–83
(United States) Serena Williams	73	23	2	98	1995–22
(United States) Lindsay Davenport	55	38	0	93	1993–08
(United States) Lisa Raymond	4	79	5	88	1993–15
(Soviet Union) (Belarus) Natasha Zvereva	4	80	2	86	1988–02
(Czech Republic) Helena Suková	10	69	5	84	1981–98
(Netherlands) Betty Stöve	1	75	4	80	1964–82
(Australia) E. Goolagong Cawley	68	11	1	80	1968–83
(United States) Venus Williams	49	22	2	73	1994–
(United States) Gigi Fernández	2	69	0	71	1983–97
(Soviet Union) (Latvia) Larisa Neiland	2	65	4	71	1982–99
(Australia) Wendy Turnbull	9	55	5	69	1970–89
(Zimbabwe) Cara Black	1	60	5	66	1998–15
(Australia) Rennae Stubbs	0	60	2	62	1986–11
(Socialist Federal Republic of Yugoslavia) (United States) Monica Seles	53	6	0	59	1989–08
(United Kingdom) Virginia Wade	55	0	0	55	1968–86
(South Africa) (United States) Liezel Huber	0	53	2	55	1993–17
(Belgium) Kim Clijsters	41	11	0	52	1999–22
(Italy) Sara Errani	9	36	4	49	2002–
(Argentina) Paola Suárez	4	44	0	48	1991–12
(Slovenia) Katarina Srebotnik	4	39	5	48	1995–20
(Spain) V. Ruano Pascual	3	43	1	47	1992–10
(United States) Kathy Jordan	3	42	2	47	1979-91
(India) Sania Mirza	1	43	3	47	2003–23
(Czechoslovakia) (Australia) Hana Mandlíková	27	19	0	46	1978–90
(Spain) Conchita Martínez	33	13	0	46	1988–06
(United States) Anne Smith	3	38	5	46	1978–91
(Japan) Ai Sugiyama	6	38	1	45	1992–09
(Belgium) Justine Henin	43	2	0	45	1999–11
(United States) Lori McNeil	10	33	1	44	1983–02
(Czech Republic) Kateřina Siniaková	5	36	2	43	2012–
(Australia) Elizabeth Smylie	3	36	3	42	1982–97
(Argentina) Gabriela Sabatini	27	14	0	41	1985–96
(Chinese Taipei) Hsieh Su-wei	3	36	2	41	2001–
(Australia) Samantha Stosur	9	28	3	40	1999–23
(Spain) Anabel Medina Garrigues	11	28	0	39	1997–18
(Russia) Maria Sharapova	36	3	0	39	2001–20
(United States) Zina Garrison	14	20	3	37	1982–97
(Russia) Nadia Petrova	13	24	0	37	1999–17
(Czech Republic) Květa Peschke	1	35	0	36	1993–22
(Chinese Taipei) Latisha Chan	0	33	3	36	2004–25
(United States) Tracy Austin	30	4	1	35	1978–94
(Italy) Roberta Vinci	10	25	0	35	1999–18
(United States) Bethanie Mattek-Sands	0	30	5	35	1999–25
(Russia) Svetlana Kuznetsova	18	16	0	34	2000–21
(Belarus) Victoria Azarenka	21	10	3	34	2003–
(Czech Republic) Barbora Strýcová	2	32	0	34	2003–23
(France) Kristina Mladenovic	1	30	3	34	2009–
(Belgium) Elise Mertens	10	24	0	34	2013–
(Germany) Claudia Kohde-Kilsch	8	25	0	33	1980–94
(France) Nathalie Tauziat	8	25	0	33	1984–03
(Denmark) Caroline Wozniacki	30	2	0	32	2005–25
(Soviet Union) / (Russia) / (Kazakhstan) Elena Likhovtseva	3	27	2	32	1992-08
(Hungary) Tímea Babos	3	29	0	32	2011–26
(Netherlands) Manon Bollegraf	1	26	4	31	1985–00
(Czech Republic) Petra Kvitová	31	0	0	31	2006–25
(Czech Republic) Barbora Krejčíková	8	20	3	31	2014–
(Russia) Vera Zvonareva	12	16	2	30	2000–
(Belarus) Aryna Sabalenka	24	6	0	30	2015–
(France) Mary Pierce	18	10	1	29	1989–08
(France) Amélie Mauresmo	25	3	0	28	1993–09
(Romania) Virginia Ruzici	12	16	0	28	1975-87
(Czech Republic) Andrea Sestini Hlaváčková	0	27	1	28	2004–22
(Italy) Flavia Pennetta	11	17	0	28	2000–15
(United States) Betsy Nagelsen	3	25	0	28	1973-96
(United States) Patty Fendick	3	25	0	28	1982-95
(Australia) Ash Barty	15	12	0	27	2010–22
(Czech Republic) Lucie Hradecká	0	26	1	27	2004–22
(France) Julie Halard-Decugis	12	15	0	27	1986–00
(Spain) María José Martínez Sánchez	5	21	0	26	1998–20
(United States) Candy Reynolds	0	26	0	26	?–88
(Romania) Simona Halep	24	1	0	25	2006–25
(China) Peng Shuai	2	23	0	25	2001–22
(Argentina) Mercedes Paz	3	22	0	25	1984–98
(United States) Barbara Potter	6	19	0	25	1978-89
(Slovakia) Janette Husárová	0	25	0	25	1991-16
(Poland) Iga Świątek	25	0	0	25	2016–
minimum 25 overall titles (correct as of January 2026)

== Gallery ==
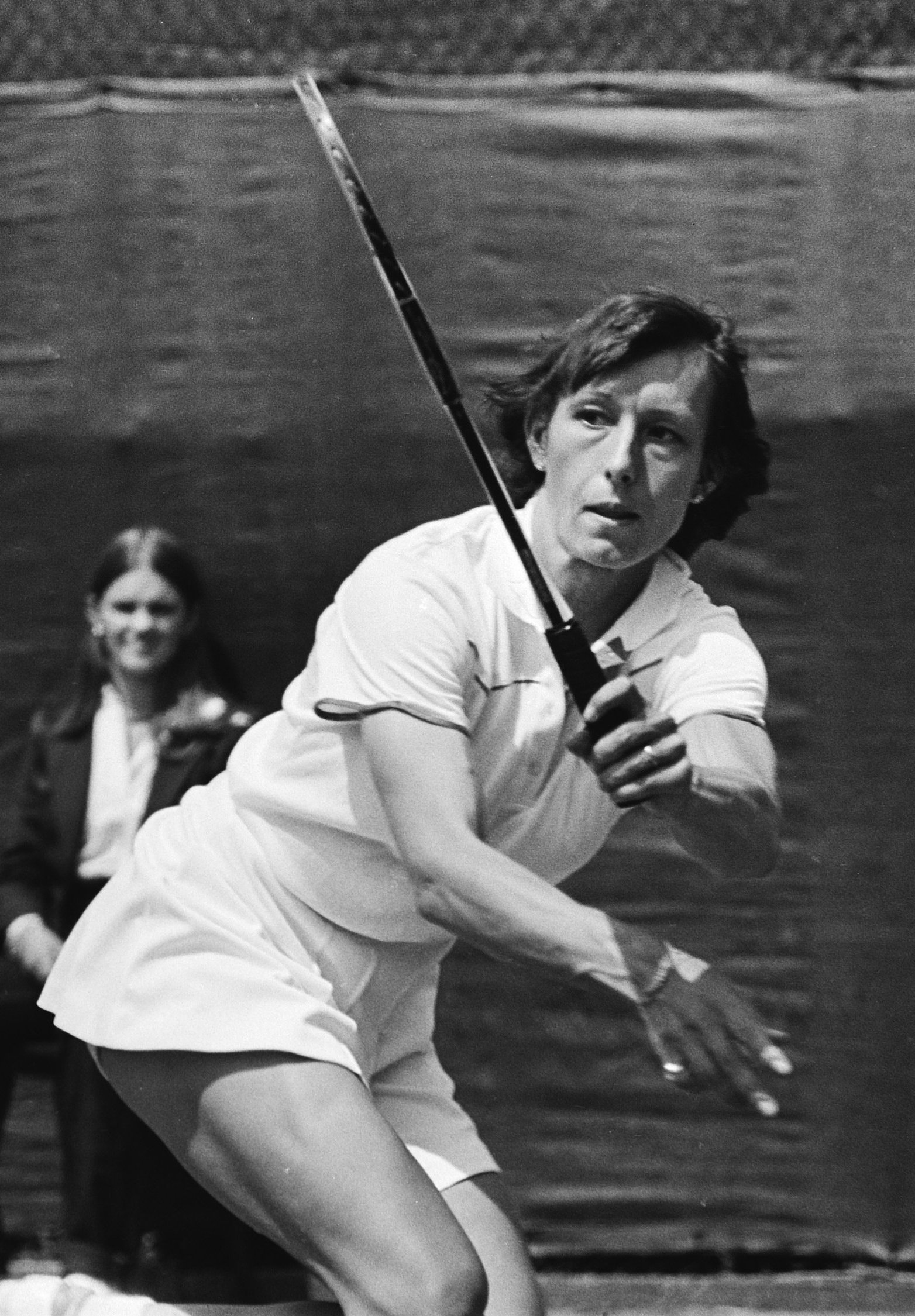
Martina Navratilova, won the most singles titles (167), doubles titles (177), and total titles (354) in the Open Era.

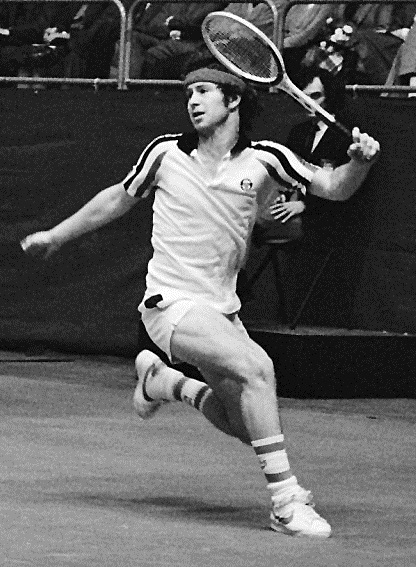
John McEnroe, won the most men's titles (singles & doubles) in the Open Era (155).

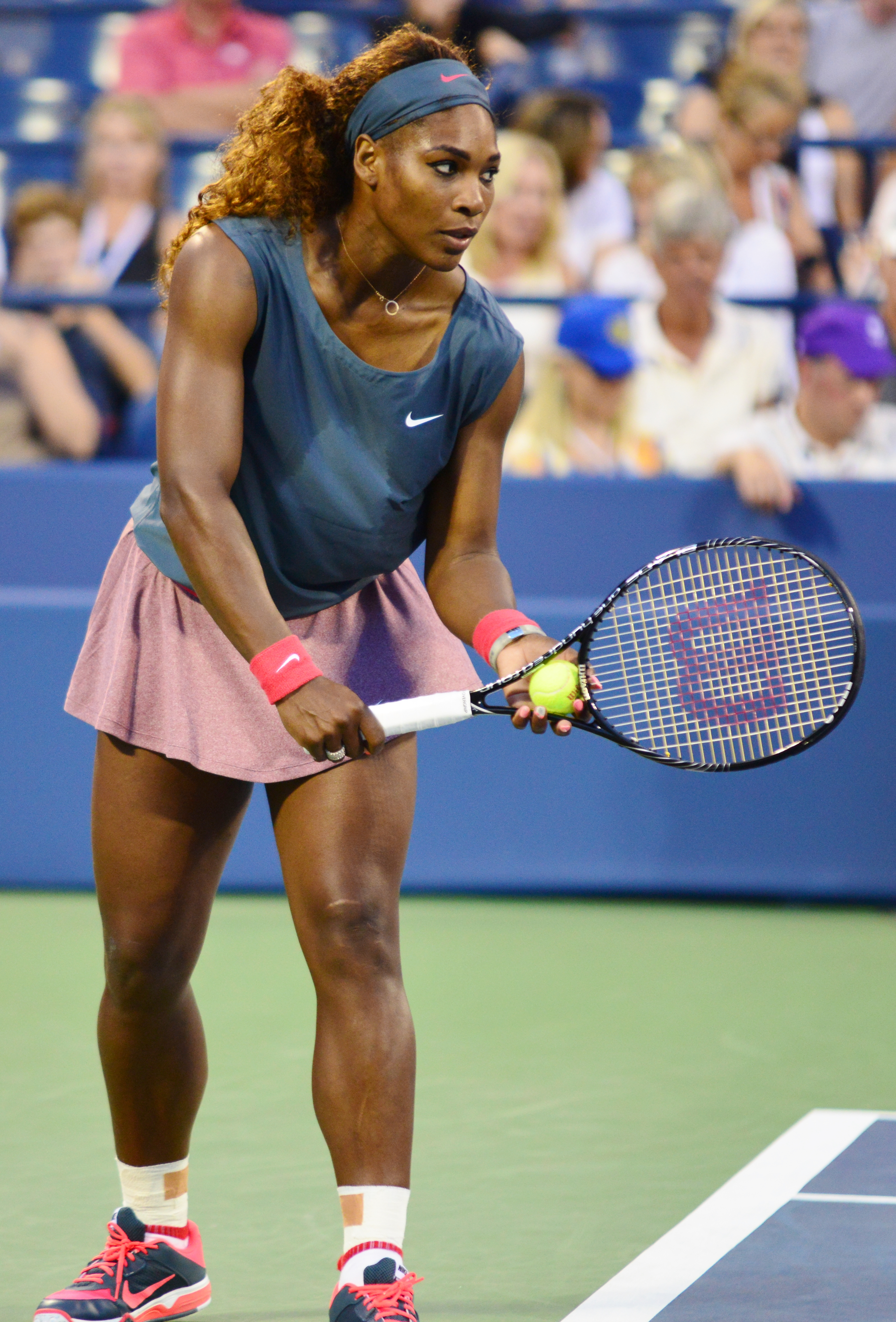
Serena Williams, won the most women's singles major titles in the Open Era (23).

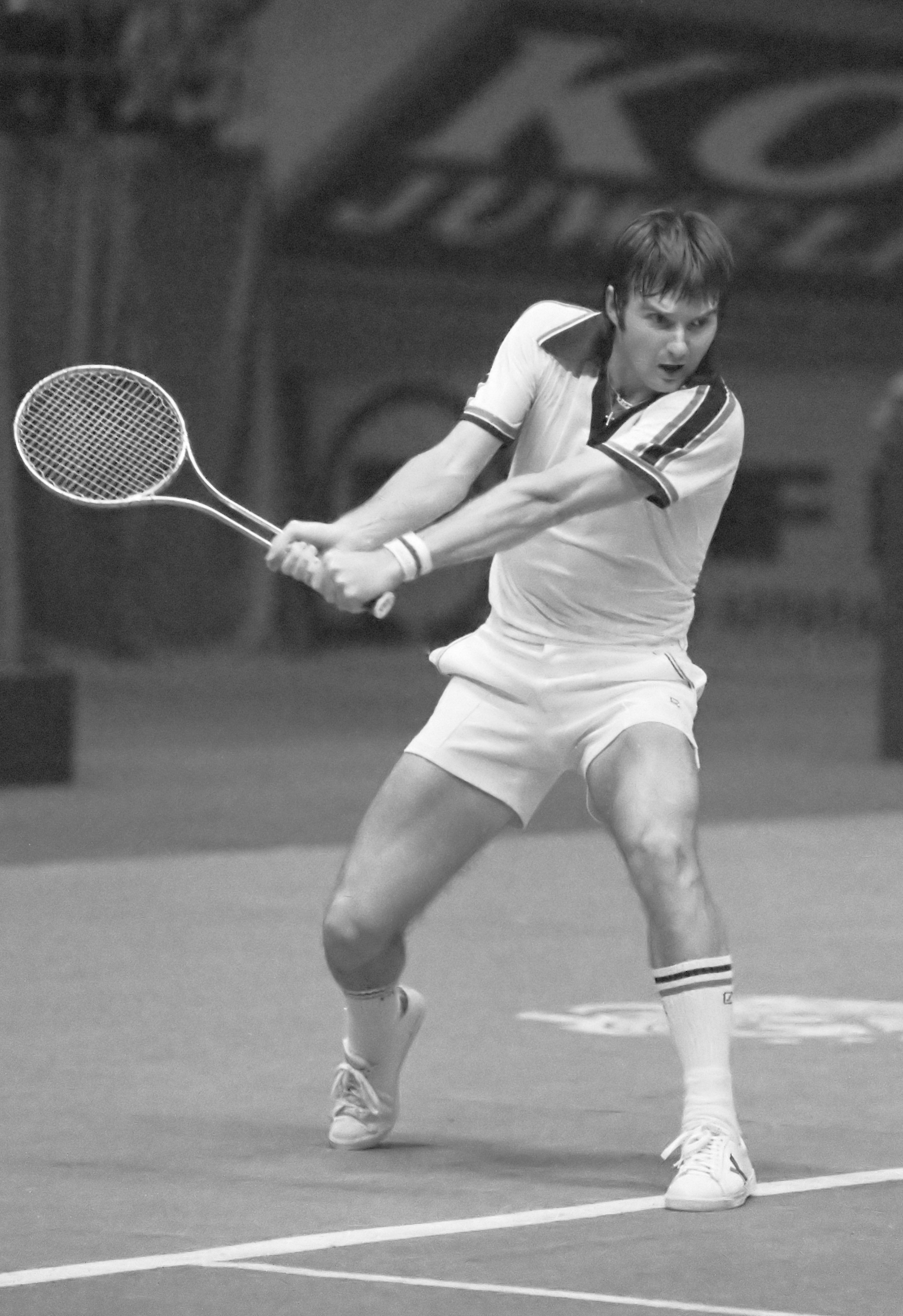
Jimmy Connors, won the most men's singles titles in the Open Era (109).

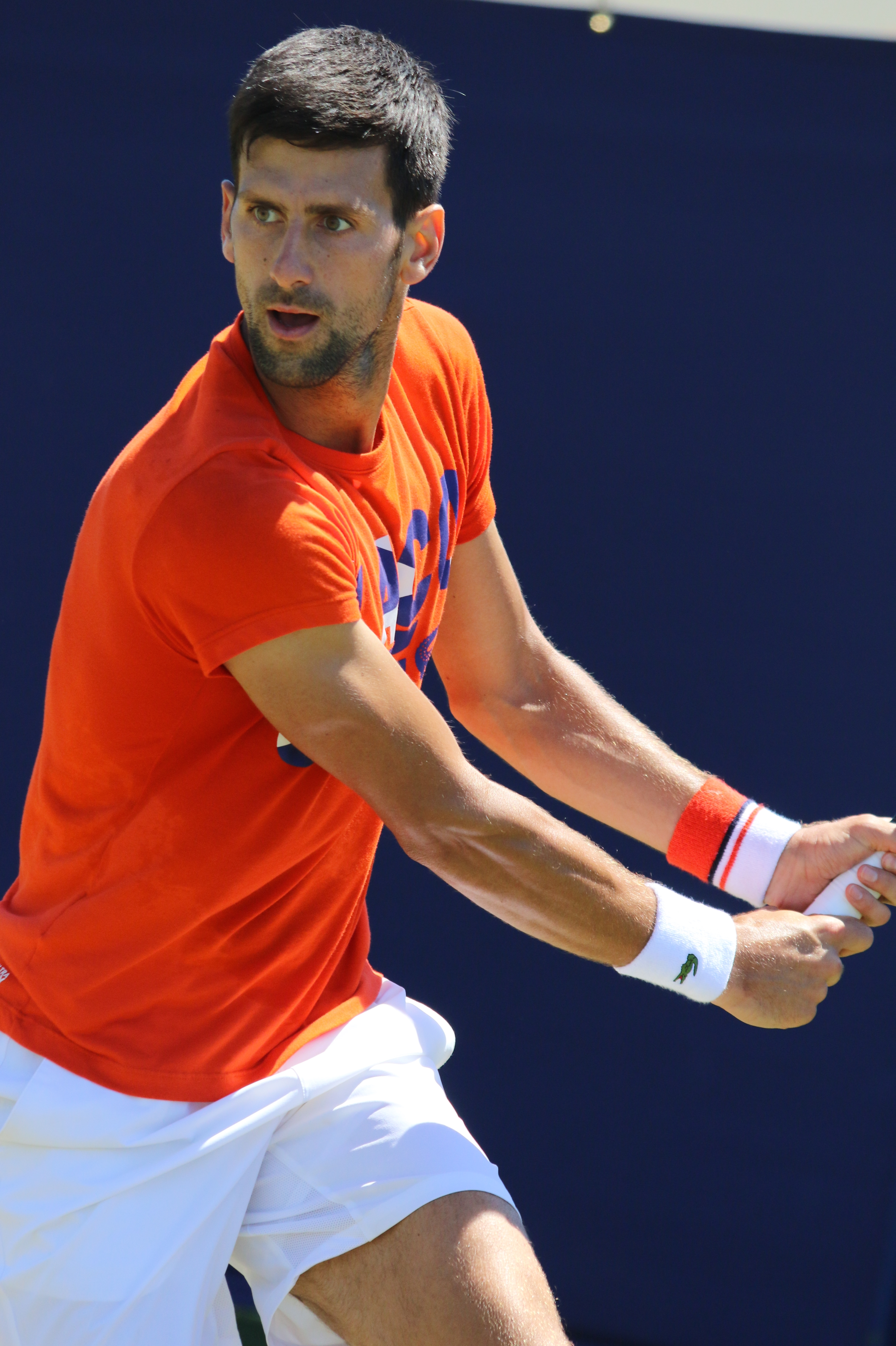
Novak Djokovic, won the most all-time men's singles major titles (24).

Chris Evert, won the most women's singles titles on clay in the Open Era (70).

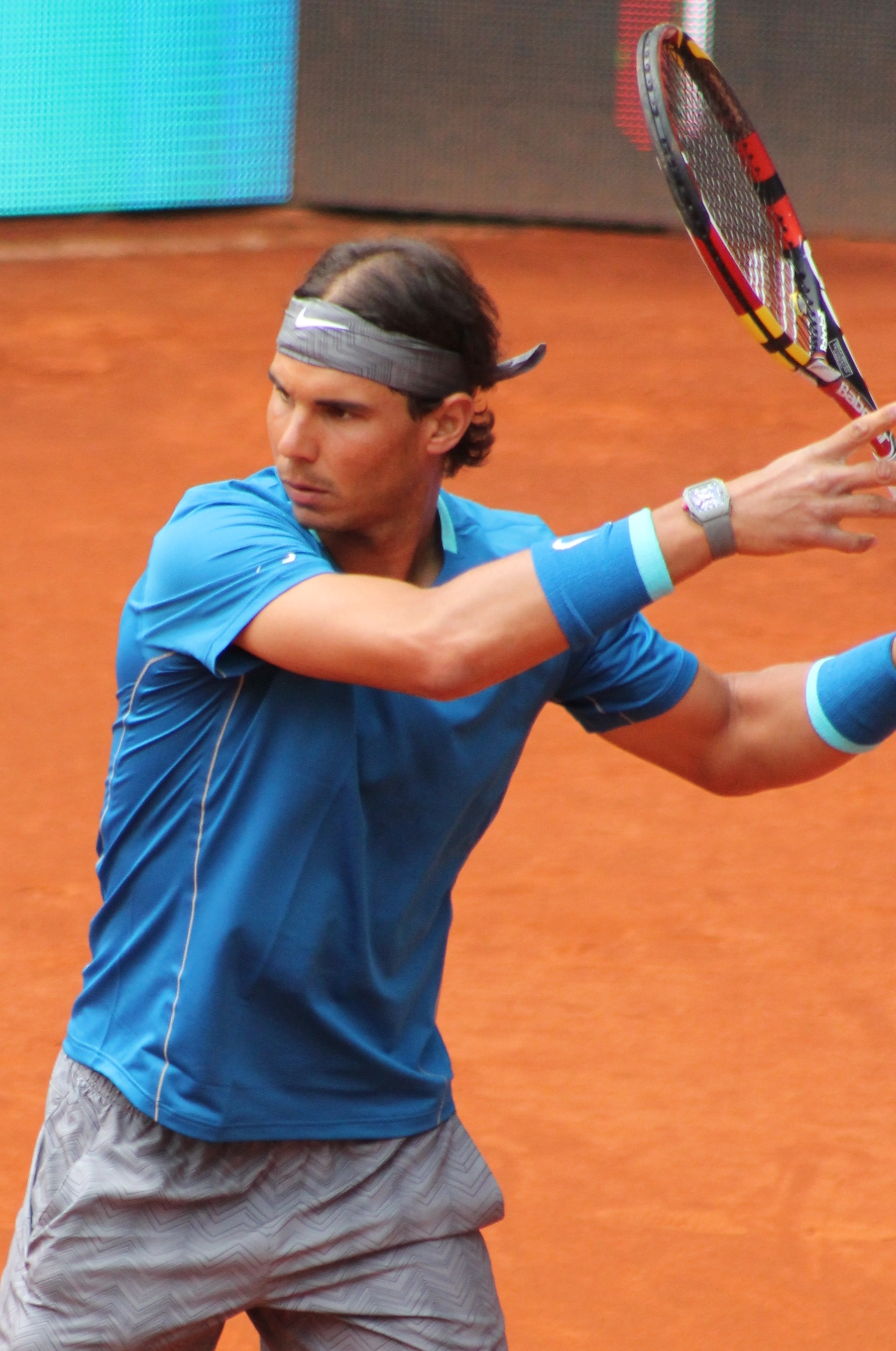
Rafael Nadal, won the most men's singles titles on clay in the Open Era (63).

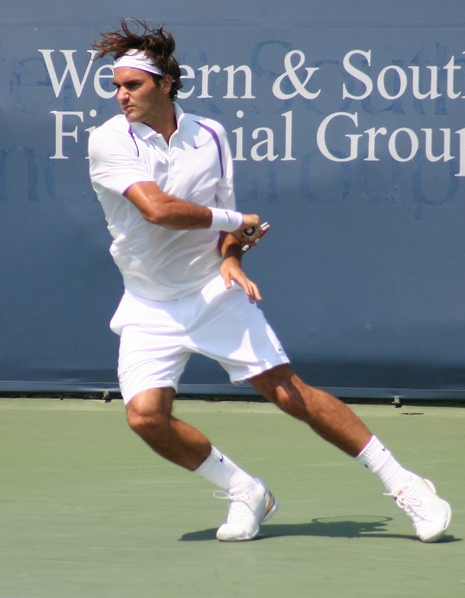
Roger Federer, won the most men's singles titles on grass in the Open Era (19).

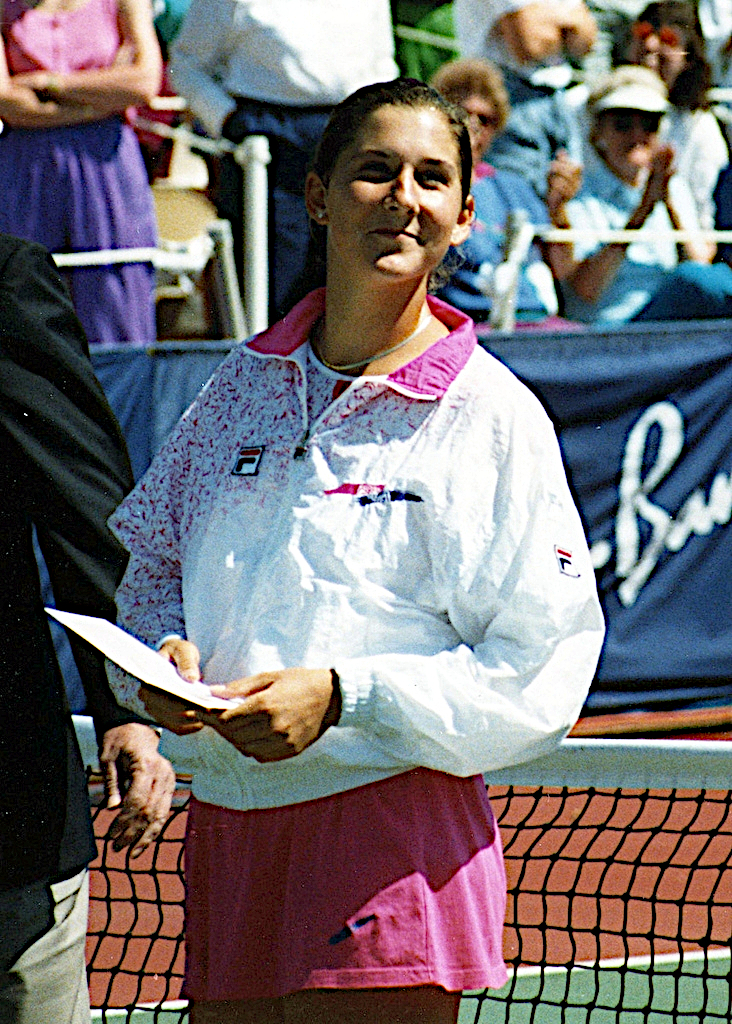
Monica Seles, won the most major titles as a teenager in the Open Era (8).

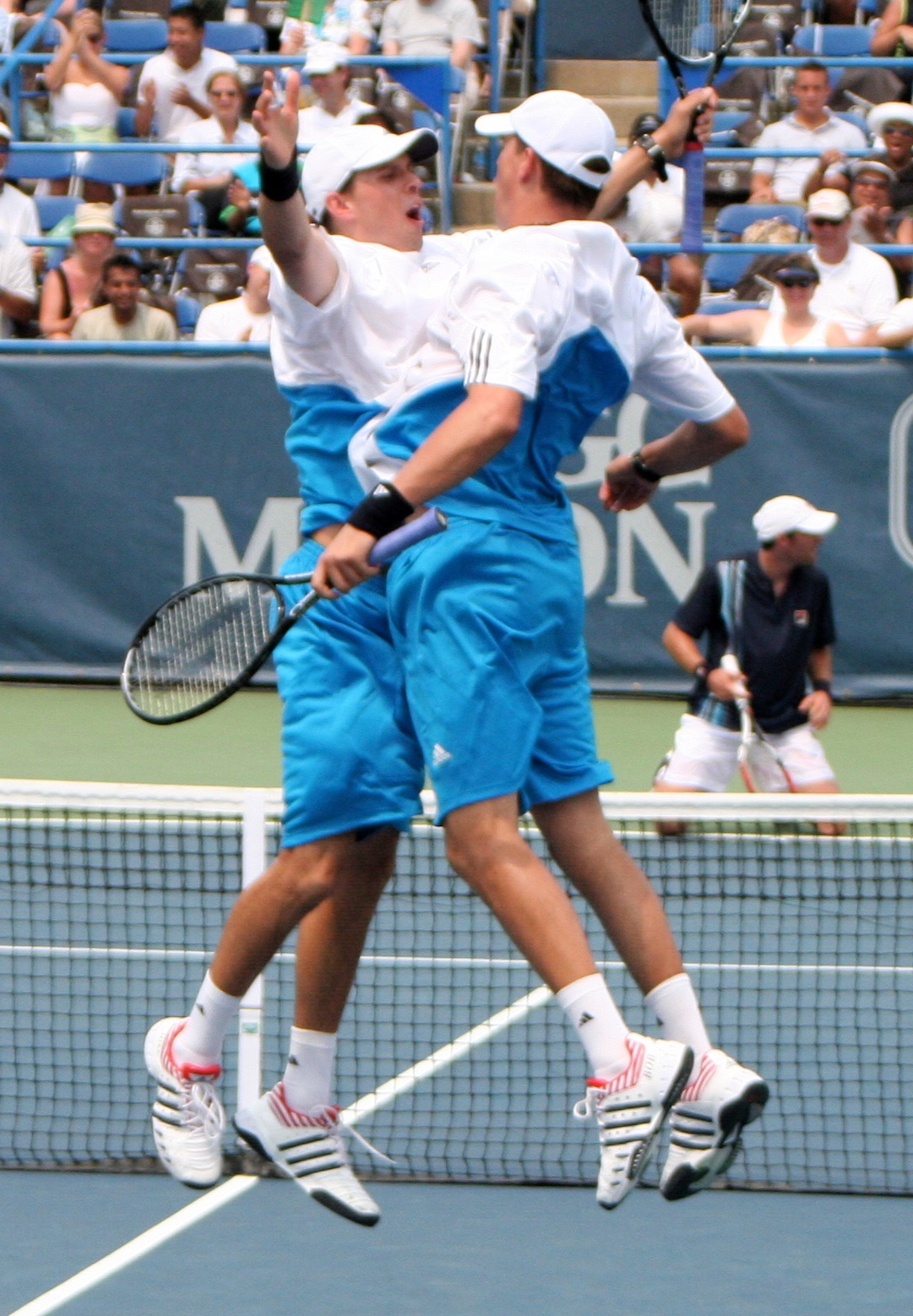
Bryan brothers, together they won more doubles titles than any other team (119).

== See also ==
- Open Era tennis records – Men's singles
- Open Era tennis records – Women's singles
- ATP Tour records
- WTA Tour records
- Chronological list of men's Grand Slam tennis champions
- Chronological list of women's Grand Slam tennis champions
- List of ATP Tour top-level tournament singles champions
- Top-level tournament statistics
