= San Juan Open =

Defunct Grand Prix affiliated men's tennis tournament

Defunct tennis tournament
- Event name: San Juan Open (1980–81)
- Tour: Grand Prix circuit
- Founded: 1980
- Abolished: 1981
- Editions: 2
- Location: San Juan, Puerto Rico
- Surface: Hard

The San Juan Open is a defunct Grand Prix affiliated men's tennis tournament played from 1980 to 1981. It was held in San Juan, Puerto Rico and played on outdoor hard courts. It was the successor tournament to the WCT Puerto Rico mens event staged once in 1975.

== Finals ==
=== Singles ===
Year	Champions	Runners-up	Score
1980	(Mexico) Raúl Ramírez	(Australia) Phil Dent	6–3, 6–2
1981	(United States) Eliot Teltscher	(United States) Tim Gullikson	6–4, 6–2

=== Doubles ===
Year	Champions	Runners-up	Score
1980	(Australia) Paul Kronk (Australia) Paul McNamee	(South Africa) Robert Trogolo (United States) Mark Turpin	7–6, 6–3
1981	(United States) Tim Mayotte (United States) Chris Mayotte	(United States) Tim Gullikson (United States) Eliot Teltscher	6–4, 7–6
