= San Juan Invitational =

Defunct tennis tournament
- Event name: Garcia Classic (sponsored name)
- Tour: Pro Tennis Tour
- Founded: 1973; 52 years ago
- Abolished: 1973; 52 years ago
- Location: San Juan, Puerto Rico
- Venue: Racquet Club Hotel
- Surface: Hard / outdoor

The San Juan Invitational , or the (Garcia Classic its sponsored name) was a men's professional tennis hard court tennis tournament played for one edition in March 1973. It was played at the Racquet Club, the Racquet Club Hotel, San Juan, Puerto Rico when it was discontinued. Also known as the Racquet Club International, it was the successor tournament to the earlier San Juan Pro Championships also played at the same venue, and was also a round robin tournament.

== History ==
The San Juan Pro Championships were first held at the Racquet Club, Racquet Club Hotel (later called the Caribe Inn Hotel), San Juan, Puerto Rico in March 1967 and played on outdoor hard courts for one edition only. In March 1973 the same venue revived a successor tournament to this one called the San Juan Invitational, that was a round robin tournament also held for one edition only.

== Finals ==
=== Singles ===
Year	Champion	2nd	Score
1973	(Soviet Union) Alex Metreveli	(United States) Harold Solomon	6–3, 2–6, 6–4
