= Maroochy Championships =

Defunct tennis tournament
- Tour: ILTF World Circuit
- Founded: 1931; 94 years ago
- Abolished: 1984; 41 years ago
- Location: Nambour, Australia
- Surface: Clay / outdoor

The Maroochy Championships was a combined clay court tennis tournament founded in 1931 as the Maroochy District Championships. Also known as the Maroochy May Day Open Championships it was played in Nambour, Shire of Maroochy, Queensland, Australia. It ran annually with breaks until 1984.
