= Miami Grand Prix (tennis) =

Defunct tennis tournament
- Event name: WCT Miami Pro Championships (1968); Aventura Tennis Classic (1971); Saga Bay Tennis Classic (1972-74); Miami Grand Prix Tennis Classic (1977); Miami Grand Prix Coca Cola Classic (1978)
- Tour: WCT circuit Grand Prix circuit
- Founded: 1968
- Abolished: 1978
- Editions: 9
- Location: North Miami Beach; Miami, Florida, US
- Surface: Hard / outdoor Clay / outdoor Carpet / indoor

The Miami Grand Prix is a defunct men's tennis tournament founded in 1968 as the WCT Miami Pro Championships when it was part of the WCT Circuit from 1968, 1971–1974 and the Grand Prix tennis circuit from 1977–1978. The event was played on outdoor asphalt hard courts in 1968, 1971–1974, then switching to outdoor clay courts in 1977, and becoming an indoor carpet courts event in 1978. The tournament was last held in Hollywood, Miami, Florida, United States.

== History ==
In February 1968 the event was named the WCT Miami Pro Championships, also referred to as the Miami Tennis Classic. The tournament was discontinued again, but was revived as the Aventura Tennis Classic in 1971, a WCT event held in Aventura Florida. In 1972 the tournament was rebranded again as the Saga Bay Tennis Classic and was played in Hollywood, Florida until 1974 when it was discontinued again, and ceased to part of the WCT Circuit. In 1977 the event was reestablished as the Miami Grand Prix Tennis Classic, a one star category ILTF Grand Prix Circuit event that was played in Hollywood, Miami, Florida, United States until the end of its run. In 1978 it was branded as the Miami Grand Prix Coca Cola Classic for sponsorship reasons.

== Past finals ==
=== Singles ===
Year	Champions	Runners-up	Score
1968	(United States) Butch Buchholz	(Australia) Tony Roche	31–22, 31–26
1969–70	Not held		
1971	(South Africa) Cliff Drysdale	(Australia) Rod Laver	6–2, 6–4, 3–6, 6–4.
1972	(Australia) Ken Rosewall	(South Africa) Cliff Drysdale	3–6, 6–2, 6–4
1973	(Australia) Rod Laver	(United States) Dick Stockton	7–6, 6–3, 7–5
1974	(South Africa) Cliff Drysdale	(United States) Tom Gorman	6–4, 7–5
1975–76	Not held		
1977	(United States) Eddie Dibbs	(Mexico) Raúl Ramírez	6–0, 6–3
1978	(Romania) Ilie Năstase	(United States) Tom Gullikson	6–3, 7–5

=== Doubles ===
Year	Champions	Runners-up	Score
1971	(Australia) John Newcombe (Australia) Tony Roche	(Australia) Roy Emerson (Australia) Rod Laver	7–6, 7–6
1972	(Netherlands) Tom Okker (United States) Marty Riessen	(Australia) Roy Emerson (Australia) Rod Laver	7–5, 6–4
1973	(Australia) Roy Emerson (Australia) Rod Laver	(Australia) Terry Addison (Australia) Colin Dibley	6–4, 6–4
1974	(Australia) John Alexander (Australia) Phil Dent	(Netherlands) Tom Okker (United States) Marty Riessen	4–6, 6–4, 7–5
1975–76	Not held		
1977	(United States) Brian Gottfried (Mexico) Raúl Ramírez	(Australia) Paul Kronk (Australia) Cliff Letcher	7–5, 6–4
1978	(United States) Tom Gullikson (United States) Gene Mayer	(Australia) Bob Carmichael (United States) Brian Teacher	7–6, 6–3

== Event names ==
- WCT Miami Pro Championships (1968)
- Miami Aventura Tennis Classic (1971)
- Miami Saga Bay Tennis Classic (1972–74)
- Miami Grand Prix Tennis Classic (1977)
- Miami Grand Prix Coca Cola Classic (1978)

== Sources ==
- ATP Tour: Tournaments: North Miami Beach: Overview
