= San Juan Pro Championships =

Defunct tennis tournament
- Tour: Pro Tennis Tour
- Founded: 1967; 58 years ago
- Abolished: 1967; 58 years ago
- Location: San Juan, Puerto Rico
- Venue: Racquet Club; Racquet Club Hotel
- Surface: Hard / outdoor
- Draw: 8
- Prize money: S15,000

The San Juan Pro Championships was a men's professional tennis hard court tennis tournament played for one edition in 1967. It was played at the Racquet Club, Racquet Club Hotel, San Juan, Puerto Rico when it was discontinued.

== History ==
The San Juan Pro Championships were first held at the Racquet Club, Racquet Club Hotel (later called the Caribe Inn Hotel), San Juan, Puerto Rico in March 1967 and played on outdoor hard courts for one edition only. In March 1973 the same venue revived a successor tournament to this one called the San Juan Invitational, that was a round robin tournament also held for one edition only.

== Finals ==
1st & 2nd Place Final
Year	Champion	2nd	Score
1967	(Australia) Rod Laver	(Spain) Andrés Gimeno	6–4, 3–6, 6–3.

3rd & 4th Place Final
Year	3rd	4th	Score
1967	(United States) Butch Buchholz	(Chile) Luis Ayala	10–5.
