= Cannes Pro Championships =

Defunct tennis tournament
- Tour: Pro Tennis Tour
- Founded: 1922; 103 years ago
- Abolished: 1968; 57 years ago
- Location: Cannes; France
- Venue: Cannes LTC
- Surface: Clay

The Cannes Pro Championships was a men's professional clay court tennis tournament founded in 1922. The first event was staged only three times till 1926. Also known as the Cannes Professional Championships in 1962 it was revived and ran annually until 1968. The event was part of the European leg of the Pro Tennis Tour. The equivalent amateur event between 1922 and 1967 was called the Cannes Championships.
