= Colonial National Invitational (tennis) =

Colonial National Invitation

Defunct tennis tournament
- Tour: WCT (1970–1973)
- Founded: 1962
- Abolished: 1973
- Editions: 12
- Location: Fort Worth, Texas, U.S.
- Venue: Colonial Country Club
- Surface: Hard / outdoor

The Colonial National Invitation was a men's tennis tournament played at the Colonial Country Club in Fort Worth, Texas, United States from 1962 to 1973. The club hired Tut Bartzen as a tennis pro and made him responsible for hosting the tournament. The inaugural edition in 1962 was an amateur-only event. In 1967 it became a professional tournament, which meant that amateurs could not compete. The total prize money for the tournament that year was $15,000 and the first-prize, won by Rod Laver, was $1,700. The following year, 1968, a women's professional event was added which was won by Ann Haydon Jones. The tournament was part of the WCT Tour from 1970 to 1973 and was held on outdoor hard courts.

== Finals ==
=== Singles ===
Year	Champions	Runners-up	Score
1962	(Australia) Roy Emerson	(United States) Chuck McKinley	4–6, 6–2, 6–3
1963	(United States) Chuck McKinley	(United States) Ham Richardson	6–3, 3–6, 10–8
1964	(Mexico) Rafael Osuna	(Spain) Manuel Santana	3–6, 6–3, 6–2
1965	(United States) Arthur Ashe	(Australia) Fred Stolle	6–3, 6–4
1966	(Mexico) Rafael Osuna	(South Africa) Cliff Drysdale	6–2, 3–6, 6–3
1967	(Australia) Rod Laver	(United States) Dennis Ralston	8–6, 6–0
1968	(Australia) Ken Rosewall	(Spain) Andrés Gimeno	6–4, 6–3
1969	(Australia) Rod Laver	(Australia) Ken Rosewall	6–3, 6–2
1970	(Australia) Rod Laver	(Australia) Roy Emerson	6–3, 7–5
1971	(Australia) Rod Laver	(United States) Marty Riessen	2–6, 6–4, 3–6, 7–5, 6–3
1972	(Australia) John Newcombe	(Australia) Ken Rosewall	5–7, 1–6, 7–5, 6–4, 6–4
1973	(United States) Eddie Dibbs	(United States) Brian Gottfried	7–5, 6–2, 6–4

=== Doubles ===
Year	Champions	Runners-up	Score
1962	(Mexico) Rafael Osuna (Mexico) Antonio Palafox	(Australia) Roy Emerson (Australia) Fred Stolle	6–1, 6–4
1963	(Mexico) Rafael Osuna (Mexico) Antonio Palafox	(United States) Ronnie Fischer (United States) Cliff Buchholz	6–3, 6–2
1964	(France) Pierre Darmon (France) Jean-Noël Grinda	(Spain) José Luis Arilla (Spain) Manuel Santana	Not played, shared
1965	(United States) Arthur Ashe (United States) Ham Richardson	(Australia) Roy Emerson (Australia) Fred Stolle	3–6, 14–12, 6–4
1971	(Australia) Roy Emerson (Australia) Rod Laver	(Netherlands) Tom Okker (United States) Marty Riessen	6–4, 7–5
1972	(Netherlands) Tom Okker (United States) Marty Riessen	(Australia) Ken Rosewall (Australia) Fred Stolle	6–2, 6–2
1973	(United States) Brian Gottfried (United States) Dick Stockton	(Australia) Owen Davidson (Australia) John Newcombe	7–6, 6–4
