= WCT Puerto Rico =

Defunct tennis tournament held in Palmas del Mar, Puerto Rico

Defunct tennis tournament
- Event name: CBS Tennis Classic San Juan
- Tour: WCT Circuit
- Founded: 1975
- Abolished: 1975
- Location: Palmas del Mar, Puerto Rico
- Surface: Hard / outdoor

The WCT Puerto Rico was a World Championship Tennis affiliated men's hard court tennis tournament staged one time in 1975. Also known as the CBS Tennis Classic San Juan for sponsorship reasons. The event was part of the WCT Circuit.

== History ==
In 1973 Caribe Hilton Invitational tournament ended after 20 years. In 1975 this men's successor event was established for one season only called the CBS Tennis Classic for sponsorship reasons, its tour name was the WCT Puerto Rico, but was played at Palmas del Mar, Puerto Rico, 45 miles from San Juan. In 1980 international tennis returned to San Juan with the staging of the San Juan Open until 1981.

== Finals ==
=== Singles ===
Year	Champions	Runners-up	Score
1975	(Australia) Rod Laver	(United States) Arthur Ashe	6–3, 7–5

== Sources ==
- ITF/Tournament/WCT Puerto Rico/1975.
