= Marty Riessen =

American tennis player

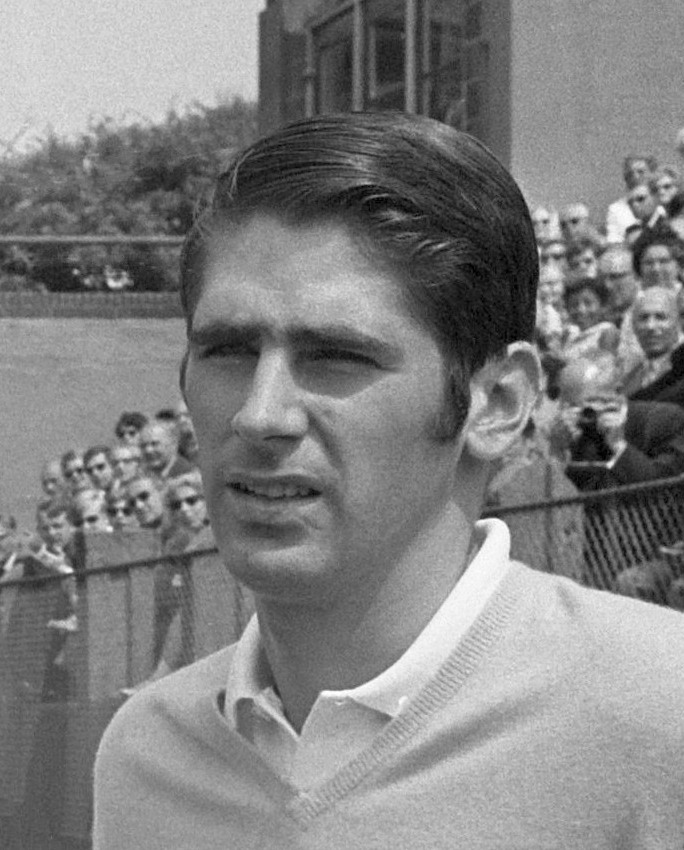
- Marty Riessen in 1968
- Country (sports): United States
- Residence: Santa Barbara, California
- Born: December 4, 1941 (age 84) Hinsdale, Illinois, US
- Height: 6 ft 1 in (1.85 m)
- Turned pro: 1968 (amateur from 1958)
- Retired: 1981
- Plays: Right-handed (one-handed backhand)
- College: Northwestern University

Singles
- Career record: 675–226 in pre Open-Era & Open Era
- Career titles: 9
- Highest ranking: No. 8 (1971, Lance Tingay)

Grand Slam singles results
- Australian Open: QF (1971)
- French Open: 4R (1971, 1974)
- Wimbledon: QF (1965)
- US Open: QF (1963, 1971)

Other tournaments
- WCT Finals: SF (1972)

Doubles
- Career record: 428–157
- Career titles: 53
- Highest ranking: No. 3 (March 3, 1980)

Grand Slam doubles results
- Australian Open: F (1971)
- French Open: W (1971)
- Wimbledon: F (1969)
- US Open: W (1976)

Grand Slam mixed doubles results
- Australian Open: W (1969)
- French Open: W (1969)
- Wimbledon: W (1975)
- US Open: W (1969, 1970, 1972, 1980)

Marty Riessen (born December 4, 1941) is an American former amateur and professional tennis player active from the 1960s to the 1980s. He was ranked as high as No. 11 in the world in singles on the ATP rankings in September 1974, though was ranked as high as world No. 8 by Lance Tingay of The Daily Telegraph in 1971 before the computer rankings. Renowned for his doubles play, Riessen was also a regular doubles partner of Australian tennis great Margaret Court, winning six of his seven major mixed titles and a career Grand Slam alongside her. Additionally a winner of two men's doubles Grand Slams, his highest doubles ranking was No. 3 in March 1980.

== Career ==
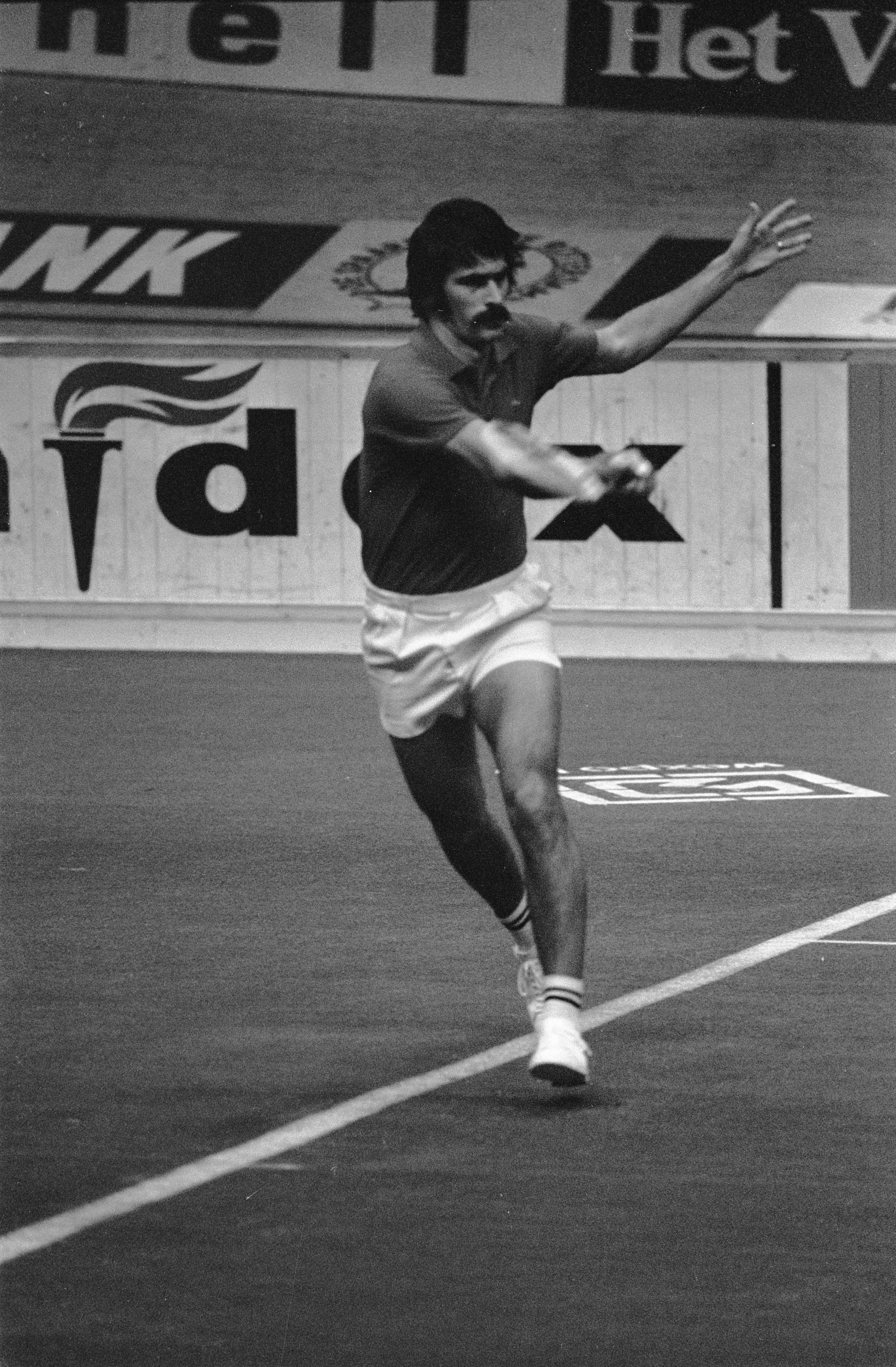
Marty Riessen at the 1972 Rotterdam Indoors tournament

Riessen played collegiate tennis at Northwestern University, where he reached the National Collegiate Athletic Association (NCAA) singles finals three times: 1962 (falling to Rafael Osuna of University of Southern California); 1963 and 1964 (falling to Dennis Ralston of USC both times). He was a semifinalist at the NCAA Doubles Championship with Clark Graebner in 1963 and 1964.

He won six singles titles in the open era, with the biggest coming in Cincinnati in 1974. (He won numerous other pre-open era titles, including two other Cincinnati titles in the pre-Open Era.) He also reached the quarterfinals in singles at both the Australian Open and the US Open in 1971.

He also won 53 doubles titles, including the US Open (in 1976), the French Open (1971, with Arthur Ashe), and seven ATP Masters Series events: Paris Indoor (1976), Canada (1971 & 1970), Monte Carlo (1970), Hamburg (1968 and 1969), and Rome (1968). He reached the doubles final at the US Open in 1978 and 1975, the Australian Open in 1971, and Wimbledon in 1969.

He was a member of the U.S. Davis Cup team in 1963, 1965, 1967, 1973 and 1981.

== Grand Slam finals ==
=== Doubles: 6 (2–4) ===
Result	Year	Championship	Surface	Partner	Opponents	Score
Loss	1969	Wimbledon	Grass	(Netherlands) Tom Okker	(Australia) John Newcombe (Australia) Tony Roche	5–7, 9–11, 3–6
Loss	1971	Australian Open	Grass	(Netherlands) Tom Okker	(Australia) John Newcombe (Australia) Tony Roche	2–6, 6–7
Win	1971	French Open	Clay	(United States) Arthur Ashe	(United States) Tom Gorman (United States) Stan Smith	6–8, 4–6, 6–3, 6–4, 11–9
Loss	1975	US Open	Clay	(Netherlands) Tom Okker	(United States) Jimmy Connors (Romania) Ilie Năstase	4–6, 6–7
Win	1976	US Open	Clay	(Netherlands) Tom Okker	(Australia) Paul Kronk (Australia) Cliff Letcher	6–4, 6–4
Loss	1978	US Open (2)	Hard	(United States) Sherwood Stewart	(South Africa) Robert Maud (Australia) Ken Rosewall	6–1, 5–7, 3–6

=== Mixed doubles: 9 (7–2) ===
Result	Year	Championship	Surface	Partner	Opponents	Score
Win	1969	Australian Open	Grass	(Australia) Margaret Smith Court	(Australia) Fred Stolle (United Kingdom) Ann Haydon-Jones	Shared, final not played
Win	1969	French Open	Clay	(Australia) Margaret Smith Court	(France) Jean-Claude Barclay (France) Françoise Dürr	6–3, 6–2
Win	1969	US Open	Grass	(Australia) Margaret Smith Court	(United States) Dennis Ralston (France) Françoise Dürr	7–5, 6–3
Win	1970	US Open (2)	Grass	(Australia) Margaret Smith Court	(South Africa) Frew McMillan (Australia) Judy Tegart Dalton	6–4, 6–4
Loss	1971	Wimbledon	Grass	(Australia) Margaret Smith Court	(Australia) Owen Davidson (United States) Billie Jean King	6–3, 2–6, 13–15
Win	1972	US Open (3)	Grass	(Australia) Margaret Smith Court	(Romania) Ilie Năstase (United States) Rosemary Casals	6–3, 7–5
Loss	1973	US Open	Grass	(Australia) Margaret Smith Court	(Australia) Owen Davidson (United States) Billie Jean King	3–6, 6–3, 6–7
Win	1975	Wimbledon	Grass	(Australia) Margaret Smith Court	(Australia) Allan Stone (Netherlands) Betty Stöve	6–4, 7–5
Win	1980	US Open (4)	Hard	(Australia) Wendy Turnbull	(South Africa) Frew McMillan (Netherlands) Betty Stöve	7–5, 6–2

== Open Era career finals ==
=== Singles: 22 (9 titles / 13 runner-ups) ===
Result	W-L	Date	Tournament	Surface	Opponent	Score
Win	1–0	1969	Perth, Australia	Grass	(Australia) Ken Rosewall	6–3, 6–4, 2–6, 2–6, 6–1
Win	2–0	1970	Wembley, UK	Carpet (i)	(Australia) Ken Rosewall	6–4, 6–2
Win	3–0	1970	Tucson WCT, US		(Australia) Roy Emerson	6–1, 6–4
Loss	3–1	1970	Paris Masters, France	Carpet (i)	(United States) Arthur Ashe	6–7, 4–6, 3–6
Win	4–1	1971	Tehran WCT, Iran	Clay	(Australia) John Alexander	6–7, 6–1, 6–3, 7–6
Loss	4–2	1971	Washington WCT, US	Hard	(Australia) Ken Rosewall	2–6, 5–7, 1–6
Loss	4–3	1971	Fort Worth WCT, US	Hard	(Australia) Rod Laver	6–2, 4–6, 6–3, 5–7, 3–6
Win	5–3	1972	Quebec WCT, Canada	Hard (i)	(Australia) Rod Laver	7–5, 6–2, 7–5
Loss	5–4	1972	Denver WCT, US	Carpet (i)	(Australia) Rod Laver	6–4, 3–6, 4–6
Loss	5–5	1972	Washington WCT, US	Clay	(Australia) Tony Roche	6–3, 6–7, 4–6
Loss	5–6	1972	Vancouver WCT, Canada	Hard	(Australia) John Newcombe	7–6, 6–7, 6–7, 5–7
Win	6–6	1973	Milan WCT, Italy	Carpet (i)	(United States) Roscoe Tanner	7–6, 6–0, 7–6
Loss	6–7	1973	Copenhagen WCT, Denmark	Carpet (i)	(United Kingdom) Roger Taylor	2–6, 3–6, 6–7
Loss	6–8	1973	Quebec WCT, Canada	Hard (i)	(United States) Jimmy Connors	1–6, 4–6, 7–6, 0–6
Loss	6–9	1974	Las Vegas, US	Hard	(Australia) Rod Laver	2–6, 2–6
Loss	6–10	1974	Chicago, US	Hard	(United States) Stan Smith	6–3, 1–6, 4–6
Win	7–10	1974	Cincinnati, US	Hard	(United States) Bob Lutz	7–6, 7–6
Win	8–10	1975	Philadelphia WCT, US	Carpet (i)	(United States) Vitas Gerulaitis	7–6, 5–7, 6–2, 6–7, 6–3
Loss	8–11	1977	La Costa, US	Hard	(United States) Brian Gottfried	3–6, 2–6
Loss	8–12	1979	Baltimore WCT, US	Carpet (i)	(United States) Harold Solomon	5–7, 4–6
Loss	8–13	1979	Dayton, US	Carpet (i)	(United States) Butch Walts	3–6, 4–6
Win	9–13	1979	Lafayette, US	Carpet	(United States) Pat DuPré	6–4, 5–7, 6–2

=== Doubles: 80 (52 titles / 28 runner-ups) ===
Result	W-L	Date	Tournament	Surface	Partner	Opponents	Score
Win	1–0	1968	Rome, Italy	Clay	(Netherlands) Tom Okker	(Greece) Nicholas Kalogeropoulos (Australia) Allan Stone	6–3, 6–4, 6–2
Win	2–0	1968	Hamburg, Germany	Clay	(Netherlands) Tom Okker	(Australia) John Newcombe (Australia) Tony Roche	6–4, 6–4, 7–5
Win	3–0	1969	Philadelphia, US	Carpet (i)	(Netherlands) Tom Okker	(Australia) John Newcombe (Australia) Tony Roche	8–6, 6–4
Loss	3–1	1969	Wimbledon, London	Grass	(Netherlands) Tom Okker	(Australia) John Newcombe (Australia) Tony Roche	5–7, 9–11, 3–6
Win	4–1	1969	Gstaad, Switzerland	Clay	(Netherlands) Tom Okker	(Australia) Mal Anderson (Australia) Roy Emerson	6–1, 6–4
Win	5–1	1969	Hamburg, Germany	Clay	(Netherlands) Tom Okker	(France) Jean-Claude Barclay (West Germany) Jürgen Fassbender	6–1, 6–2, 6–4
Win	6–1	1970	Monte Carlo, Monaco	Clay	(United Kingdom) Roger Taylor	(France) Pierre Barthès (Socialist Federal Republic of Yugoslavia) Nikola Pilić	6–3, 6–4, 6–2
Win	7–1	1970	London Queen's Club, UK	Grass	(Netherlands) Tom Okker	(United States) Arthur Ashe (United States) Charlie Pasarell	6–4, 6–4
Loss	7–2	1970	Gstaad, Switzerland	Clay	(Netherlands) Tom Okker	(South Africa) Cliff Drysdale (United Kingdom) Roger Taylor	2–6, 3–6, 2–6
Win	8–2	1970	Toronto, Canada	Clay	(Australia) Bill Bowrey	(South Africa) Cliff Drysdale (Australia) Fred Stolle	6–3, 6–2
Win	9–2	1970	Los Angeles, US	Hard	(Netherlands) Tom Okker	(United States) Bob Lutz (United States) Stan Smith	7–6, 6–2
Loss	9–3	1971	Australian Open, Melbourne	Grass	(Netherlands) Tom Okker	(Australia) John Newcombe (Australia) Tony Roche	2–6, 6–7
Win	10–3	1971	Chicago WCT, US	Hard (i)	(Netherlands) Tom Okker	(Australia) John Newcombe (Australia) Tony Roche	7–6, 4–6, 7–6
Win	11–3	1971	Dallas WCT, US	Carpet	(Netherlands) Tom Okker	(United States) Bob Lutz (United States) Charlie Pasarell	6–3, 6–4
Win	12–3	1971	French Open, Paris	Clay	(United States) Arthur Ashe	(United States) Tom Gorman (United States) Stan Smith	6–8, 4–6, 6–3, 6–4, 11–9
Win	13–3	1971	London Queen's Club, UK	Grass	(Netherlands) Tom Okker	(United States) Erik van Dillen (United States) Stan Smith	8–6, 4–6, 10–8
Win	14–3	1971	Washington, D.C., US	Clay	(Netherlands) Tom Okker	(Australia) Bob Carmichael (Australia) Ray Ruffels	7–6, 6–2
Loss	14–4	1971	Quebec WCT, Canada	Hard (i)	(Netherlands) Tom Okker	(Australia) Roy Emerson (Australia) Rod Laver	6–7, 2–6
Loss	14–5	1971	Boston WCT, US	Clay	(Netherlands) Tom Okker	(Australia) Roy Emerson (Australia) Rod Laver	4–6, 4–6
Win	15–5	1971	Montreal, Canada	Clay	(Netherlands) Tom Okker	(United States) Arthur Ashe (United States) Dennis Ralston	6–3, 6–3, 6–1
Win	16–5	1971	Cologne, Germany	Carpet (i)	(Netherlands) Tom Okker	(Australia) Roy Emerson (Australia) Rod Laver	6–7, 3–6, 7–6, 6–3, 6–4
Win	17–5	1972	Richmond WCT, US	Carpet	(Netherlands) Tom Okker	(Australia) John Newcombe (Australia) Tony Roche	7–6, 7–6
Win	18–5	1972	Miami WCT, US	Hard	(Netherlands) Tom Okker	(Australia) Roy Emerson (Australia) Rod Laver	7–5, 6–4
Win	19–5	1972	Chicago WCT, US	Hard	(Netherlands) Tom Okker	(Australia) Roy Emerson (Australia) Rod Laver	6–2, 6–3
Win	20–5	1972	Charlotte WCT, US	Clay	(Netherlands) Tom Okker	(Australia) John Newcombe (Australia) Tony Roche	6–4, 4–6, 7–6
Win	21–5	1972	Washington, D.C., US	Clay	(Netherlands) Tom Okker	(Australia) John Newcombe (Australia) Tony Roche	3–6, 6–3, 6–2
Win	22–5	1972	Fort Worth WCT, US	Hard	(Netherlands) Tom Okker	(Australia) Ken Rosewall (Australia) Fred Stolle	6–2, 6–2
Win	23–5	1972	Montreal WCT, Canada	Outdoor	(Netherlands) Tom Okker	(South Africa) Robert Maud (Australia) Ken Rosewall	6–1, 4–6, 7–6
Win	24–5	1972	Alamo WCT, US	Outdoor	(Netherlands) Tom Okker	(New Zealand) Brian Fairlie (Egypt) Ismail El Shafei	7–6, 6–4
Win	25–5	1972	Stockholm, Sweden	Hard (i)	(Netherlands) Tom Okker	(Australia) Colin Dibley (Australia) Roy Emerson	7–5, 7–6
Win	26–5	1972	Gothenburg WCT, Sweden	Carpet (i)	(Netherlands) Tom Okker	(New Zealand) Brian Fairlie (Egypt) Ismail El Shafei	6–2, 7–6
Win	27–5	1973	London WCT, UK	Carpet (i)	(Netherlands) Tom Okker	(United States) Arthur Ashe (United States) Roscoe Tanner	6–3, 6–3
Win	28–5	1973	Milan WCT, Italy	Carpet (i)	(Netherlands) Tom Okker	(Australia) Ken Rosewall (Australia) Fred Stolle	6–3, 6–3
Loss	28–6	1973	Cologne WCT, Germany	Carpet (i)	(Netherlands) Tom Okker	(United Kingdom) Mark Cox (United Kingdom) Graham Stilwell	6–7, 3–6
Win	29–6	1973	Washington WCT, US	Carpet (i)	(Netherlands) Tom Okker	(United States) Arthur Ashe (United States) Roscoe Tanner	4–6, 7–6, 6–2
Win	30–6	1973	Houston, US	Clay	(Netherlands) Tom Okker	(United States) Arthur Ashe (United States) Roscoe Tanner	7–5, 7–5
Win	31–6	1973	Charlotte WCT, US	Clay	(Netherlands) Tom Okker	(United States) Erik van Dillen (United States) Tom Gorman	7–6, 3–6, 6–3
Loss	31–7	1973	Denver WCT, US	Carpet (i)	(Netherlands) Tom Okker	(United States) Arthur Ashe (United States) Roscoe Tanner	6–3, 3–6, 6–7
Loss	31–8	1973	World Doubles WCT, Montreal	Carpet (i)	(Netherlands) Tom Okker	(United States) Bob Lutz (United States) Stan Smith	2–6, 6–7, 0–6
Win	32–8	1973	London Queen's Club, UK	Grass	(Netherlands) Tom Okker	(Australia) Ray Keldie (South Africa) Raymond Moore	6–4, 7–5
Loss	32–9	1973	Quebec WCT, Canada	Hard (i)	(United States) Jimmy Connors	(Australia) Bob Carmichael (South Africa) Frew McMillan	2–6, 6–7
Loss	32–10	1974	Toronto WCT, Canada	Carpet (i)	(Netherlands) Tom Okker	(Mexico) Raúl Ramírez (Australia) Tony Roche	3–6, 6–2, 4–6
Loss	32–11	1974	Miami WCT, US	Hard	(Netherlands) Tom Okker	(Australia) John Alexander (Australia) Phil Dent	6–4, 4–6, 5–7
Loss	32–12	1974	Washington WCT, US	Carpet (i)	(Netherlands) Tom Okker	(South Africa) Bob Hewitt (South Africa) Frew McMillan	6–7, 3–6
Win	33–12	1974	Chicago, US	Hard (i)	(United States) Tom Gorman	(United States) Brian Gottfried (Mexico) Raúl Ramírez	4–6, 6–3, 7–5
Win	34–12	1974	Washington, D.C., US	Clay	(United States) Tom Gorman	(Chile) Patricio Cornejo (Chile) Jaime Fillol	7–5, 6–1
Loss	34–13	1974	Boston, US	Clay	(West Germany) Hans-Jürgen Pohmann	(United States) Bob Lutz (United States) Stan Smith	6–3, 4–6, 3–6
Win	35–13	1974	Stockholm, Sweden	Hard (i)	(Netherlands) Tom Okker	(South Africa) Bob Hewitt (South Africa) Frew McMillan	2–6, 6–3, 6–4
Loss	35–14	1974	Johannesburg, South Africa	Hard	(Netherlands) Tom Okker	(South Africa) Bob Hewitt (South Africa) Frew McMillan	6–7, 4–6, 3–6
Loss	35–15	1975	Nottingham, UK	Grass	(Netherlands) Tom Okker	(United States) Charlie Pasarell (United States) Roscoe Tanner	2–6, 3–6
Loss	35–16	1975	US Open, New York	Clay	(Netherlands) Tom Okker	(United States) Jimmy Connors (Romania) Ilie Năstase	4–6, 6–7
Loss	35–17	1975	Los Angeles, US	Hard	(South Africa) Cliff Drysdale	(India) Anand Amritraj (India) Vijay Amritraj	6–7, 6–4, 4–6
Loss	35–18	1976	Memphis WCT, US	Hard (i)	(United States) Roscoe Tanner	(India) Anand Amritraj (India) Vijay Amritraj	3–6, 4–6
Win	36–18	1976	La Costa, US	Hard	(United States) Roscoe Tanner	(United States) Peter Fleming (United States) Gene Mayer	7–6, 7–6
Win	37–18	1976	Johannesburg WCT, South Africa	Hard	(United States) Roscoe Tanner	(South Africa) Frew McMillan (Netherlands) Tom Okker	6–2, 7–5
Win	38–18	1976	South Orange, US	Clay	(United States) Fred McNair	(United States) Vitas Gerulaitis (Romania) Ilie Năstase	7–5, 4–6, 6–2
Win	39–18	1976	US Open, New York	Clay	(Netherlands) Tom Okker	(Australia) Paul Kronk (Australia) Cliff Letcher	6–4, 6–4
Win	40–18	1976	Paris Masters, France	Carpet (i)	(Netherlands) Tom Okker	(United States) Fred McNair (United States) Sherwood Stewart	6–2, 6–2
Loss	40–19	1976	Stockholm Open, Sweden	Hard (i)	(Netherlands) Tom Okker	(South Africa) Bob Hewitt (South Africa) Frew McMillan	4–6, 6–4, 4–6
Loss	40–20	1977	Palm Springs, US	Hard	(United States) Roscoe Tanner	(South Africa) Bob Hewitt (South Africa) Frew McMillan	6–7, 6–7
Win	41–20	1977	Woodlands Doubles, US	Hard	(Netherlands) Tom Okker	(United States) Tim Gullikson (United States) Tom Gullikson	3–6, 6–3, 6–3, 4–6, 6–1
Win	42–20	1977	San Francisco, US	Hard (i)	(United States) Dick Stockton	(United States) Fred McNair (United States) Sherwood Stewart	6–4, 1–6, 6–4
Loss	42–21	1977	Hong Kong	Hard	(United States) Roscoe Tanner	(Australia) Syd Ball (Australia) Kim Warwick	6–7, 3–6
Loss	42–22	1978	Springfield, US	Carpet (i)	(Czechoslovakia) Jan Kodeš	(United States) Bob Lutz (United States) Stan Smith	3–6, 3–6
Loss	42–23	1978	US Open, New York	Hard	(United States) Sherwood Stewart	(South Africa) Robert Maud (Australia) Ken Rosewall	6–1, 5–7, 3–6
Loss	42–24	1978	Woodlands Doubles, US	Hard	(United States) Sherwood Stewart	(Poland) Wojtek Fibak (Netherlands) Tom Okker	6–7, 6–3, 6–4, 6–7, 3–6
Win	43–24	1979	Baltimore WCT, US	Carpet (i)	(United States) Sherwood Stewart	(India) Anand Amritraj (South Africa) Cliff Drysdale	7–6, 6–4
Win	44–24	1979	Las Vegas, US	Hard	(United States) Sherwood Stewart	(Italy) Adriano Panatta (Mexico) Raúl Ramírez	4–6, 6–4, 7–6
Loss	44–25	1979	London Queen's Club, UK	Grass	(United States) Sherwood Stewart	(United States) Tim Gullikson (United States) Tom Gullikson	4–6, 4–6
Loss	44–26	1979	Surbiton, UK	Grass	(United States) Pat DuPré	(United States) Tim Gullikson (United States) Tom Gullikson	3–6, 7–6, 6–8
Win	45–26	1979	Washington, D.C., US	Clay	(United States) Sherwood Stewart	(United States) Brian Gottfried (Mexico) Raúl Ramírez	2–6, 6–3, 6–4
Win	46–26	1979	Louisville, US	Hard	(United States) Sherwood Stewart	(India) Vijay Amritraj (Mexico) Raúl Ramírez	6–2, 1–6, 6–1
Win	47–26	1979	Lafayette, US	Carpet	(United States) Sherwood Stewart	(United States) Victor Amaya (United States) Eric Friedler	6–4, 6–4
Win	48–26	1979	Woodlands Doubles, US	Hard	(United States) Sherwood Stewart	(Australia) Bob Carmichael (United States) Tim Gullikson	6–3, 2–2 ret.
Win	49–26	1979	Los Angeles, US	Carpet	(United States) Sherwood Stewart	(Poland) Wojtek Fibak (South Africa) Frew McMillan	6–4, 6–4
Win	50–26	1979	Tokyo Indoor, Japan	Carpet (i)	(United States) Sherwood Stewart	(United States) Mike Cahill (United States) Terry Moor	6–4, 7–6
Win	51–26	1980	Baltimore WCT, US	Carpet (i)	(United States) Tim Gullikson	(United States) Brian Gottfried (South Africa) Frew McMillan	2–6, 6–3, 6–4
Loss	51–27	1980	Houston, US	Clay	(United States) Sherwood Stewart	(Australia) Peter McNamara (Australia) Paul McNamee	4–6, 4–6
Loss	51–28	1980	Tokyo Indoor, Japan	Carpet (i)	(United States) Sherwood Stewart	(United States) Victor Amaya (United States) Hank Pfister	3–6, 6–3, 6–7
Win	52–28	1981	Philadelphia, US	Carpet (i)	(United States) Sherwood Stewart	(United States) Brian Gottfried (Mexico) Raúl Ramírez	6–2, 6–2

== Grand Slam performance timeline ==
Key
W	F	SF	QF	#R	RR	Q#	DNQ	A	NH

(W) winner; (F) finalist; (SF) semifinalist; (QF) quarterfinalist; (#R) rounds 4, 3, 2, 1; (RR) round-robin stage; (Q#) qualification round; (DNQ) did not qualify; (A) absent; (NH) not held; (SR) strike rate (events won / competed); (W–L) win–loss record.

Tournament	1958	1959	1960	1961	1962	1963	1964	1965	1966	1967	1968	1969	1970	1971	1972	1973	1974	1975	1976	1977		1978	1979	1980	SR	W–L	Win %
Australian Open	A	A	A	A	A	A	A	A	3R	A	A	3R	A	QF	A	A	A	A	A	3R	A	A	A	A	0 / 4	7–4	63.6
French Open	A	A	A	A	A	A	A	A	1R	A	1R	2R	A	4R	A	A	4R	A	A	A		A	A	A	0 / 5	7–3	70.0
Wimbledon	A	A	A	2R	A	A	2R	QF	3R	3R	3R	1R	4R	4R	A	A	2R	4R	2R	2R		3R	2R	1R	0 / 16	25–16	61.0
US Open	1R	1R	2R	3R	3R	QF	3R	4R	4R	2R	2R	4R	1R	QF	3R	2R	4R	1R	3R	2R		3R	2R	1R	0 / 23	39–22	63.9
Win–loss	0–0	0–1	1–1	3–2	2–1	4–1	3–2	7–2	6–3	3–2	2–2	5–4	3–2	12–4	3–1	1–1	7–3	3–2	3–2	4–3		4–2	2–2	0–2	0 / 48	78–45	63.4
