= 1972 Holton Tennis Classic =

- Date: June 26 – July 2
- Edition: 2nd
- Category: World Championship Tennis (WCT)
- Draw: 32S / 16D
- Prize money: $50,000
- Surface: Hard / outdoor
- Location: St. Louis, Missouri, United States
- Venue: Dwight Davis Tennis Center, Forest Park

Champions

Singles
- (Australia) John Newcombe

Doubles
- (Australia) John Newcombe / (Australia) Tony Roche
← 1970 ·	St. Louis WCT	· 1973 →

The 1972 Holton Tennis Classic, also known as the St. Louis WCT, was a men's professional tennis tournament that was part of the 1972 World Championship Tennis circuit. It was held on outdoor hard courts at the Dwight Davis Tennis Center in Forest Park in St. Louis, Missouri in the United States. It was the second edition of the tournament and was held from June 26 through July 2, 1972. Seventh-seeded John Newcombe won the singles title and earned $10,000 first-prize money.

== Finals ==
=== Singles ===
(Australia) John Newcombe defeated (Socialist Federal Republic of Yugoslavia) Nikola Pilić 6–3, 6–3

- It was Newcombe's 2nd singles title of the year and the 14th of his career in the Open Era.

=== Doubles ===
(Australia) John Newcombe / (Australia) Tony Roche defeated (Australia) John Alexander / (Australia) Phil Dent 7–6, 6–2
