= 1970 Rawlings Tennis Classic – Singles =

Tennis tournament event

Singles
- 1970 Rawlings Tennis Classic

Final
- Champion: (Australia) Rod Laver
- Runner-up: (Australia) Ken Rosewall
- Score: 6–1, 6–4

Details
- Draw: 20
- Seeds: 8

Events
Singles	Doubles
St. Louis WCT	· 1972 →

The 1970 Rawlings Tennis Classic – Singles was an event of the 1970 Rawlings Tennis Classic men's tennis tournament that was played at the Dwight Davis Tennis Center in Forest Park in St. Louis, Missouri in the United States from May 26 through June 4, 1970. The draw comprised 20 players and eight were seeded. First-seeded Rod Laver won the singles title, defeating second-seeded Ken Rosewall in the final, 6–1, 6–4. The final was played indoor at the Washington University Field House due to bad weather. Roy Emerson won 6–4, 6–1 against Fred Stolle in a third-place playoff match.

== Seeds ==
1. (Australia) Rod Laver (champion)
2. (Australia) Ken Rosewall (final)
3. (Australia) Fred Stolle (semifinals)
4. (United States) Dennis Ralston (quarterfinals)
5. (Spain) Andrés Gimeno (second round)
6. (Australia) Roy Emerson (semifinals)
7. (United States) Marty Riessen (second round)
8. (Australia) John Newcombe (quarterfinals)

== Draw ==
=== Key ===
- Q = Qualifier
- WC = Wild card
- LL = Lucky loser
- Alt = Alternate
- ITF = ITF entry
- PR = Protected ranking
- SR = Special ranking
- SE = Special exempt
- JE = Junior exempt
- JR = Junior Accelerator Programme entrant
- CO = College Accelerator Programme entrant
- NG = Next Gen Accelerator Program entrant
- w/o = Walkover
- r = Retired
- d = Defaulted

=== Finals ===
Semifinals
1	(Australia) Rod Laver	4	7	6
6	(Australia) Roy Emerson	6	5	3
3	(Australia) Fred Stolle	2	1
2	(Australia) Ken Rosewall	6	6

Final
1	(Australia) Rod Laver	6	6
2	(Australia) Ken Rosewall	1	4

=== Top half ===
First Round
6	(Australia) Roy Emerson	6	6
(United States) Larry Miller	4	1
(Denmark) Torben Ulrich	6	6
(United Kingdom) Graham Stilwell	3	3

Second Round
1	(Australia) Rod Laver	6	6
(United States) Ronald Holmberg	4	2
(Egypt) Ismail El Shafei	8	8
7	(United States) Marty Riessen	6	6
4	(United States) Dennis Ralston	6	6
(United States) Ray Moore	4	3
6	(Australia) Roy Emerson	6	6
(Denmark) Torben Ulrich	0	2

Quarterfinals
1	(Australia) Rod Laver	6	5	6
(Egypt) Ismail El Shafei	2	7	1
4	(United States) Dennis Ralston	4	4
6	(Australia) Roy Emerson	6	6

Semifinals
1	(Australia) Rod Laver	4	7	6
6	(Australia) Roy Emerson	6	5	3

=== Bottom half ===
First Round
(France) Pierre Barthès	6	3	6
(South Africa) Cliff Drysdale	2	6	2
5	(Spain) Andrés Gimeno	6	6
(United States) Dick Horowitz	3	1

Second Round
(France) Pierre Barthès	6	7
5	(Spain) Andrés Gimeno	4	5
3	(Australia) Fred Stolle	6	6
(Australia) Bill Bowrey	4	1
8	(Australia) John Newcombe	6	6
(Socialist Federal Republic of Yugoslavia) Nikola Pilić	3	1
(United Kingdom) Mark Cox	4	2
2	(Australia) Ken Rosewall	6	6

Quarterfinals
(France) Pierre Barthès	4	4
3	(Australia) Fred Stolle	6	6
8	(Australia) John Newcombe	6	5
2	(Australia) Ken Rosewall	8	7

Semifinals
3	(Australia) Fred Stolle	2	1
2	(Australia) Ken Rosewall	6	6

== See also ==
- Laver–Rosewall rivalry
