= 1970 Rawlings Tennis Classic – Doubles =

Tennis tournament event

Doubles
- 1970 Rawlings Tennis Classic

Final
- Champion: (Spain) Andrés Gimeno (Australia) John Newcombe
- Runner-up: (Australia) Roy Emerson (Australia) Rod Laver
- Score: 6–4, 6–2

Details
- Draw: 10
- Seeds: 4

Events
Singles	Doubles
St. Louis WCT	· 1972 →

The 1970 Rawlings Tennis Classic – Doubles was an event of the 1970 Rawlings Tennis Classic men's tennis tournament that was played at the Dwight Davis Tennis Center in Forest Park in St. Louis, Missouri in the United States< The event was scheduled from May 26 through June 1, 1970 but the final was delayed due to a power outage followed by bad weather at which point the doubles finalists Andrés Gimeno and John Newcombe had to travel to Casablanca, Morocco for the Moroccan Pro Championships. Subsequently, the doubles final was rescheduled to and played on August 24, 1970. The draw comprised 10 teams of which four were seeded. Fourth-seeded Andrés Gimeno and John Newcombe won the doubles title, defeating second-seeded Roy Emerson and Rod Laver in the final, 6–4, 6–2. The final was played indoor at the Washington University Field House due to bad weather.

== Seeds ==
1. (Australia) Ken Rosewall / (Australia) Fred Stolle (semifinals)
2. (Australia) Roy Emerson / (Australia) Rod Laver (final)
3. (Spain) Andrés Gimeno / (Australia) John Newcombe (champions)
4. (France) Pierre Barthès / (Socialist Federal Republic of Yugoslavia) Nikola Pilić (first round)

== Draw ==
=== Key ===
- Q = Qualifier
- WC = Wild card
- LL = Lucky loser
- Alt = Alternate
- ITF = ITF entry
- PR = Protected ranking
- SR = Special ranking
- SE = Special exempt
- JE = Junior exempt
- JR = Junior Accelerator Programme entrant
- CO = College Accelerator Programme entrant
- NG = Next Gen Accelerator Program entrant
- w/o = Walkover
- r = Retired
- d = Defaulted

First Round
3	(Spain) Andrés Gimeno (Australia) John Newcombe	3	8	6
(United Kingdom) Mark Cox (United Kingdom) Graham Stilwell	6	6	2
(Australia) Bill Bowrey (United States) Marty Riessen	6	6	8
4	(France) Pierre Barthès (Socialist Federal Republic of Yugoslavia) Nikola Pilić	8	3	6

Quarterfinals
1	(Australia) Ken Rosewall (Australia) Fred Stolle	6	6
(Egypt) Ismail El Shafei (Denmark) Torben Ulrich	4	0
3	(Spain) Andrés Gimeno (Australia) John Newcombe	6	6
(South Africa) Cliff Drysdale (South Africa) Ray Moore	4	3
(United States) Ronald Holmberg (United States) Dennis Ralston	3	8	6
(Australia) Bill Bowrey (United States) Marty Riessen	6	6	4
(United States) Dick Horowitz (United States) Larry Miller	0	0
2	(Australia) Roy Emerson (Australia) Rod Laver	6	6

Semifinals
1	(Australia) Ken Rosewall (Australia) Fred Stolle	4	6	3
3	(Spain) Andrés Gimeno (Australia) John Newcombe	6	3	6
(United States) Ronald Holmberg (United States) Dennis Ralston	5	3
2	(Australia) Roy Emerson (Australia) Rod Laver	7	6

Final
3	(Spain) Andrés Gimeno (Australia) John Newcombe	6	6
2	(Australia) Roy Emerson (Australia) Rod Laver	4	2
