= 1970 Rawlings Tennis Classic =

- Date: May 25– June 1
- Edition: 1st
- Category: World Championship Tennis (WCT)
- Draw: 20S / 10D
- Prize money: $30,000
- Surface: Hard / outdoor Hard / indoor (final)
- Location: St. Louis, Missouri, United States
- Venue: Dwight Davis Tennis Center, Forest Park; Washington University Field House (final)

Champions

Singles
- (Australia) Rod Laver

Doubles
- (Spain) Andrés Gimeno / (Australia) John Newcombe
St. Louis WCT	· 1972 →

The 1970 Rawlings Tennis Classic, also known as the St. Louis WCT, was a men's professional tennis tournament that was part of the 1970 World Championship Tennis circuit. It was held on outdoor hard courts at the Dwight Davis Tennis Center in Forest Park in St. Louis, Missouri in the United States. It was the inaugural edition of the tournament and was scheduled from May 25 through June 1, 1970 but both finals were delayed due to a power outage on the day before the finals and rain on the day of the finals. The singles finalists then had to travel to New York to compete in the Tennis Champions Classic before returning. Due to persistent bad weather the singles final was played indoor at the Washington University Field House on June 4, 1970. First-seeded Rod Laver won the singles title and earned $8,000 first-prize money. The doubles finalists Andrés Gimeno and John Newcombe had to travel to Casablanca, Morocco for the Moroccan Pro Championships and their final was rescheduled and played on August 24, 1970. This was followed by a Rawlings Challenge Cup match between tournament winner Rod Laver and Wimbledon champion John Newcombe which was won by Laver 6–3, 8–6.

== Finals ==
=== Singles ===
(Australia) Rod Laver defeated (Australia) Ken Rosewall 6–1, 6–4

- It was Laver's 4th singles title of the year and the 32nd of his career in the Open Era.

=== Doubles ===
(Spain) Andrés Gimeno / (Australia) John Newcombe defeated (Australia) Roy Emerson / (Australia) Rod Laver 6–4, 6–2

== See also ==
- Laver–Rosewall rivalry
