= 1977 St. Louis Tennis Classic =

- Date: March 16–20
- Edition: 7th
- Category: World Championship Tennis (WCT)
- Draw: 16S / 8D
- Prize money: $100,000
- Surface: Carpet / indoor
- Location: St. Louis, Missouri, United States
- Venue: The Arena
- Attendance: 43,333

Champions

Singles
- (United States) Jimmy Connors

Doubles
- (United States) Brian Gottfried / (Mexico) Raúl Ramírez
← 1976 ·	St. Louis WCT	· 1978 →

The 1977 St. Louis Tennis Classic, also known as the St. Louis WCT, was a men's professional tennis tournament that was part of the 1977 World Championship Tennis circuit. It was played on indoor carpet courts at The Arena in St. Louis, Missouri in the United States. It was the seventh edition of the tournament and was held from March 16 through March 20, 1977. First-seeded Jimmy Connors won the singles title and earned $30,000 first-prize money.

== Finals ==
=== Singles ===
(United States) Jimmy Connors defeated (Australia) John Alexander 7–6^{(7–4)}, 6–2

- It was Connors' 2nd singles title of the year and the 55th of his career.

=== Doubles ===
(Romania) Ilie Năstase / (Italy) Adriano Panatta defeated (India) Vijay Amritraj / (United States) Dick Stockton 6–4, 3–6, 7–6

- It was Năstase's 1st doubles title of the year and the 33rd of his career. It was Panatta's 1st doubles title of the year and the 9th of his career.
