= 1974 Holton Tennis Classic =

- Date: April 22–28
- Edition: 4th
- Category: World Championship Tennis (WCT)
- Draw: 32S / 16D
- Prize money: $50,000
- Surface: Carpet / indoor
- Location: St. Louis, Missouri, United States
- Venue: Kiel Auditorium

Champions

Singles
- (United States) Stan Smith

Doubles
- (Egypt) Ismail El Shafei / (New Zealand) Brian Fairlie
← 1973 ·	St. Louis WCT	· 1975 →

The 1974 Holton Tennis Classic, (named after its sponsor the Holton Capital Group) also known as the St. Louis Tennis Classic or tour name St. Louis WCT, was a men's professional tennis tournament that was part of the blue Group of the 1974 World Championship Tennis circuit. It was held on indoor carpet courts at the Kiel Auditorium in St. Louis, Missouri in the United States. It was the fourth edition of the tournament and was held from April 22 through April 28, 1974. Second-seeded Stan Smith won his second consecutive singles title at the event and earned $10,000 first-prize money.

== Finals ==
=== Singles ===
(United States) Stan Smith defeated (Soviet Union) Alex Metreveli 6–2, 3–6, 6–2

- It was Smith' 2nd singles title of the year and the 45th of his career in the Open Era.

=== Doubles ===
(Egypt) Ismail El Shafei / (New Zealand) Brian Fairlie defeated (Australia) Ross Case / (Australia) Geoff Masters 7–6, 6–7, 7–6
