= 1975 St. Louis Tennis Classic =

- Date: April 7–13
- Edition: 5th
- Category: World Championship Tennis (WCT)
- Draw: 32S / 16D
- Prize money: $60,000
- Surface: Carpet / indoor
- Location: St. Louis, Missouri, United States
- Venue: Kiel Auditorium

Champions

Singles
- (United States) Vitas Gerulaitis

Doubles
- (Australia) Colin Dibley / (Australia) Ray Ruffels
← 1974 ·	St. Louis WCT	· 1976 →

The 1975 St. Louis Tennis Classic, also known as the St. Louis WCT, was a men's professional tennis tournament that was part of the Blue Group of the 1975 World Championship Tennis circuit. It was played on indoor carpet courts at the Kiel Auditorium in St. Louis, Missouri in the United States. It was the fifth edition of the tournament and was held from April 7 through April 13, 1975. Fourth-seeded Vitas Gerulaitis won the singles title and earned $12,000 first-prize money.

== Finals ==
=== Singles ===
(United States) Vitas Gerulaitis defeated (United States) Roscoe Tanner 2–6, 6–2, 6–3

- It was Gerulaitis' 2nd and last singles title of the year and the 3rd of his career.

=== Doubles ===
(Australia) Colin Dibley / (Australia) Ray Ruffels defeated (Australia) Ross Case / (Australia) Geoff Masters 6–4, 6–4
