= 1973 Holton Tennis Classic – Singles =

Tennis tournament event

Singles
- 1973 Holton Tennis Classic

Final
- Champion: (United States) Stan Smith
- Runner-up: (Australia) Rod Laver
- Score: 6–4, 3–6, 6–4

Details
- Draw: 32
- Seeds: 12

Events
| Singles | Doubles |
- St. Louis WCT

The 1973 Holton Tennis Classic – Singles was an event of the 1973 Holton Tennis Classic men's tennis tournament that was played at the Kiel Auditorium in St. Louis, Missouri in the United States from March 26 through April 1, 1973. The draw comprised 36 players and 12 of them were seeded. John Newcombe was the defending champion but did not compete in this edition. Second-seeded Stan Smith won the singles title, defeating first-seeded Rod Laver in the final, 6–4, 3–6, 6–4 and earned $10,000 first-prize money.

== Seeds ==
1. (Australia) Rod Laver (final)
2. (United States) Stan Smith (champion)
3. (Australia) Roy Emerson (first round)
4. (United States) Bob Lutz (quarterfinals)
5. (United States) Dick Stockton (first round)
6. (Australia) Colin Dibley (first round)
7. (Australia) John Alexander (quarterfinals)
8. (United States) Cliff Richey (quarterfinals)
9. (Socialist Federal Republic of Yugoslavia) Nikola Pilić (semifinals)
10. (Australia) Phil Dent (second round)
11. (Chile) Jaime Fillol (second round)
12. (South Africa) Bob Maud (first round)

== Draw ==
Key

- Q = Qualifier
- WC = Wild card
- LL = Lucky loser
- Alt = Alternate
- ITF = ITF entry
- PR = Protected ranking
- SR = Special ranking
- SE = Special exempt
- JE = Junior exempt
- JR = Junior Accelerator Programme entrant
- CO = College Accelerator Programme entrant
- NG = Next Gen Accelerator Program entrant
- w/o = Walkover
- r = Retired
- d = Defaulted

=== Finals ===
Semifinals
1 | (Australia) Rod Laver | 6 | 6
9 | (Socialist Federal Republic of Yugoslavia) Nikola Pilić | 3 | 3
(South Africa) Cliff Drysdale | 3 | 3
2 | (United States) Stan Smith | 6 | 6

Final
1 | (Australia) Rod Laver | 4 | 6 | 4
2 | (United States) Stan Smith | 6 | 3 | 6

=== Top half ===
First Round
1 | (Australia) Rod Laver | 6 | 6
(New Zealand) Onny Parun | 3 | 4
(United States) Roy Barth | 6 | 0 | 6
(Czechoslovakia) Milan Holeček | 3 | 6 | 3
(Chile) Patricio Cornejo | 1 | 3
(Sweden) Ove Bengtson | 6 | 6
(United Kingdom) Gerald Battrick | 7 | 3 | 6
5 | (United States) Dick Stockton | 5 | 6 | 3
8 | (United States) Cliff Richey | 6 | 4 | 6
(United States) Charlie Pasarell | 1 | 6 | 4
(United States) Jim McManus | 6 | 6
12 | (South Africa) Bob Maud | 2 | 3
9 | (Socialist Federal Republic of Yugoslavia) Nikola Pilić | 6 | 6
(Brazil) José Edison Mandarino | 0 | 1
(United States) Brian Gottfried | 4 | 6 | 7^{10}
3 | (Australia) Roy Emerson | 6 | 4 | 6^{8}

Second Round
1 | (Australia) Rod Laver | 6 | 7^{7}
(United States) Roy Barth | 2 | 6^{0}
(Sweden) Ove Bengtson | 3 | 6 | 3
(United Kingdom) Gerald Battrick | 6 | 4 | 6
8 | (United States) Cliff Richey | 6 | 7^{7}
(United States) Jim McManus | 3 | 6^{2}
9 | (Socialist Federal Republic of Yugoslavia) Nikola Pilić | 6 | 6
(United States) Brian Gottfried | 2 | 3

Quarterfinals
1 | (Australia) Rod Laver | 6 | 3 | 6
(United Kingdom) Gerald Battrick | 3 | 6 | 2
8 | (United States) Cliff Richey | 6 | 6^{5} | 6^{4}
9 | (Socialist Federal Republic of Yugoslavia) Nikola Pilić | 4 | 7^{7} | 7^{7}

Semifinals
1 | (Australia) Rod Laver | 6 | 6
9 | (Socialist Federal Republic of Yugoslavia) Nikola Pilić | 3 | 3

=== Bottom half ===
First Round
4 | (United States) Bob Lutz | 6 | 6
(United States) Butch Buchholz | 3 | 2
(Australia) Terry Addison | 0 | 4
10 | (Australia) Phil Dent | 6 | 6
(South Africa) Frew McMillan | 1 | 1
(Australia) Allan Stone | 6 | 6
(South Africa) Cliff Drysdale | 6 | 7^{9}
6 | (Australia) Colin Dibley | 4 | 6^{7}
7 | (Australia) John Alexander | 6 | 6
(Rhodesia) Andrew Pattison | 3 | 4
11 | (Chile) Jaime Fillol | 6 | 6
(Australia) Barry Phillips-Moore | 2 | 4
(United States) Tom Edlefsen | 1 | 6^{3}
(United States) Frank Froehling | 6 | 7^{7}
(United States) Harold Solomon | 2 | 4
2 | (United States) Stan Smith | 6 | 6

Second Round
4 | (United States) Bob Lutz | 6 | 6
10 | (Australia) Phil Dent | 3 | 2
(Australia) Allan Stone | 4 | 6^{3}
(South Africa) Cliff Drysdale | 6 | 7^{7}
7 | (Australia) John Alexander | 6 | 7^{7}
11 | (Chile) Jaime Fillol | 4 | 6^{4}
(United States) Frank Froehling | 4 | 0
2 | (United States) Stan Smith | 6 | 6

Quarterfinals
4 | (United States) Bob Lutz | 1 | 3
(South Africa) Cliff Drysdale | 6 | 6
7 | (Australia) John Alexander | 6 | 0 | 6^{1}
2 | (United States) Stan Smith | 4 | 6 | 7^{7}

Semifinals
(South Africa) Cliff Drysdale | 3 | 3
2 | (United States) Stan Smith | 6 | 6
