= Great Forest Park Balloon Race =

Annual hot air ballon festival in St. Louis, US

Coordinates: 38°38′17″N 90°17′06″W

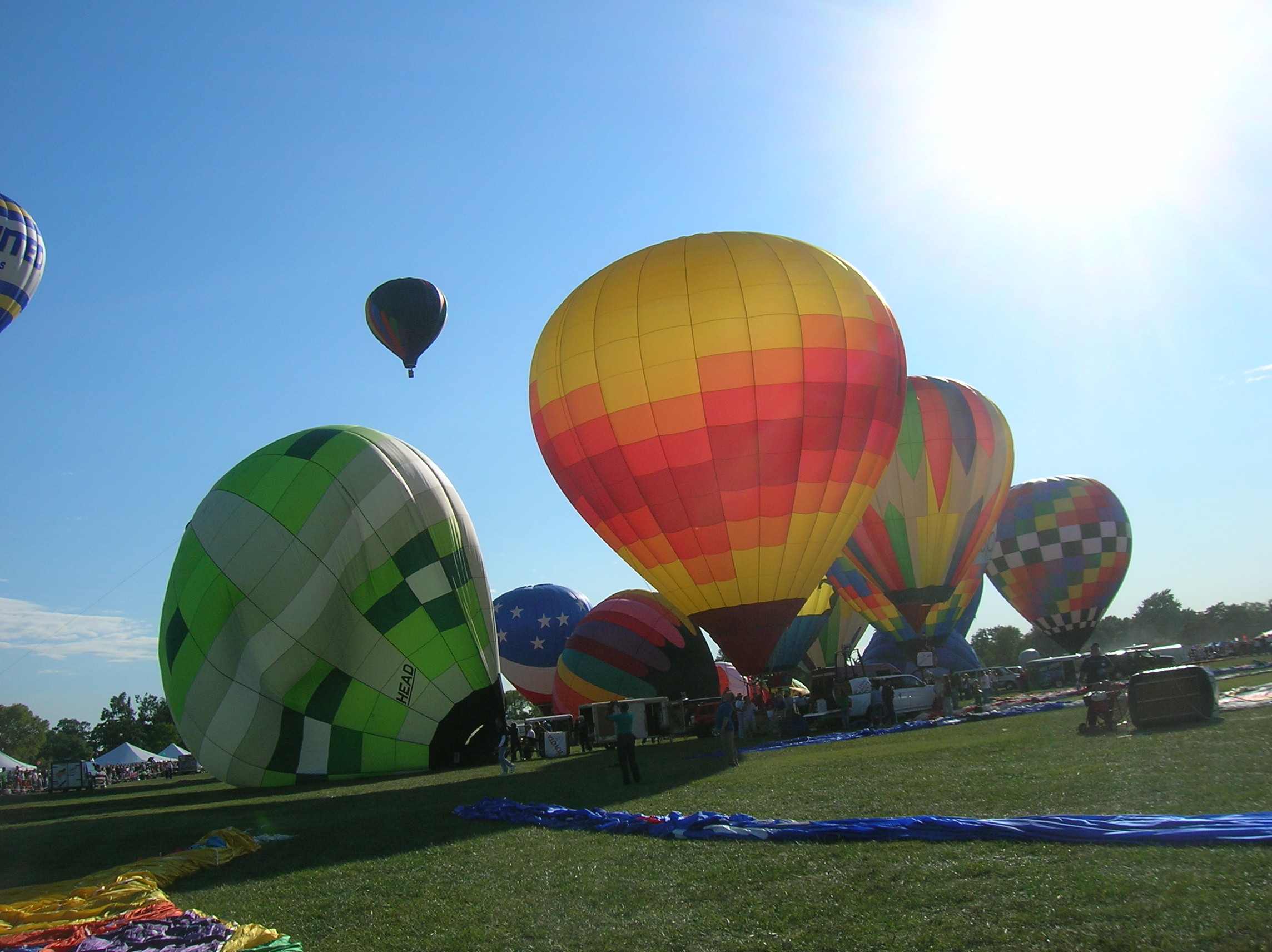
- Genre: Hot air balloon festival
- Dates: 20-21 September 2024
- Frequency: Annual
- Locations: Forest Park, St. Louis, Missouri
- Years active: 53
- Participants: 70
- Attendance: 130,000
- Website: http://www.greatforestparkballoonrace.com

The Great Forest Park Balloon Race is an annual hot air balloon festival held in Forest Park in St. Louis, Missouri. With more than 70 entrants and 130,000 spectators, it is the most well-attended single-day hot air balloon race in the United States.

== History ==
The first race was launched by Nikki Caplan and John O'Toole in December 1973 at a gathering of six balloons and twenty spectators. In 1977, organization of the race passed from Caplan and O'Toole to a group of four novice balloonists who continue to coordinate the event today. These men are John Marlow, John Schaumburg, Ted Staley, and Dan Schettler, who formed a ballooning group known as the Mississippi River Balloon Transit Company. This company now is the host of the largest and most well attended balloon race. On May 23, 2000, the race was honored by the American Folklife Center at the Library of Congress as a local legacy after a nomination by then-Minority Leader of the United States House of Representatives Dick Gephardt. So now, the Great Forest Park Balloon Race is forever documented through photographs, advertisements, media, and pilot rewards.

No race was held in 2020.

== Current status ==
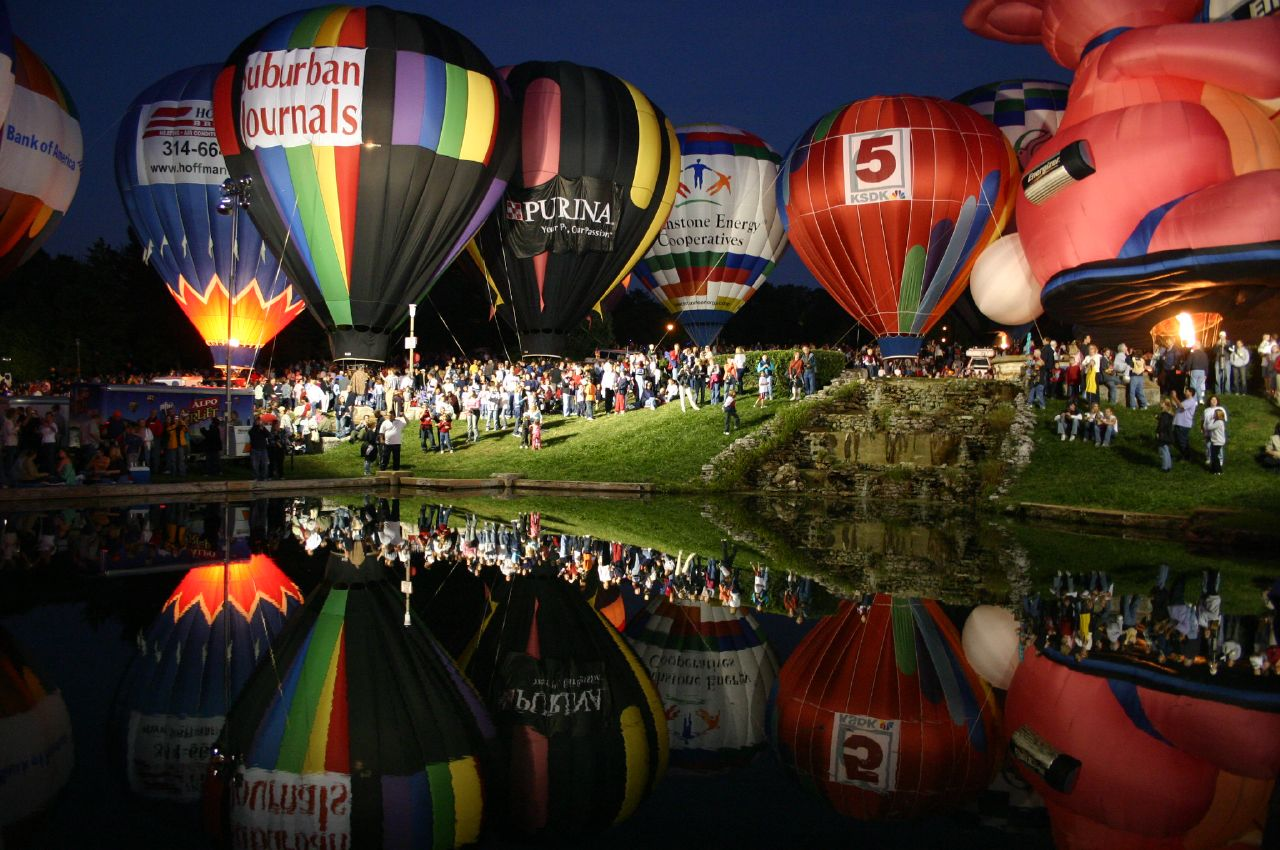
Balloon Glow in September 2005

On the day before the race, the hot air balloons participate in the Balloon Glow, a night glow opportunity for spectators to walk among inflated balloons illuminated by their burners. In addition to the Balloon Glow and a fireworks show, during the week of the event, a free public orchestral concert by the Saint Louis Symphony Orchestra is held on nearby Art Hill, adjacent to the Saint Louis Art Museum. During the race, the balloonists attempt to "chase" a 166-foot balloon of a pink bunny after taking off from the Central Fields in Forest Park. The goal is to follow the bunny until it lands, and then each pilot drops a sandbag or birdseed bag as close as possible to the bunny balloon. The winner is decided based on which pilot's sandbag, or birdseed bag, is the closest to the bunny. Due to its urban location in the city of St. Louis, the race is considered "particularly prestigious and challenging", and participation is by invitation only. At times, landing sites have included backyards, baseball diamonds, golf courses, street intersections, and the convent grounds of the School Sisters of Notre Dame. The balloon race is accompanied by a festival that includes food and drink, inflatable castles, and a climbing wall.
