= Memorial to the Confederate Dead (St. Louis) =

Confederate memorial in St. Louis, Missouri, U.S.

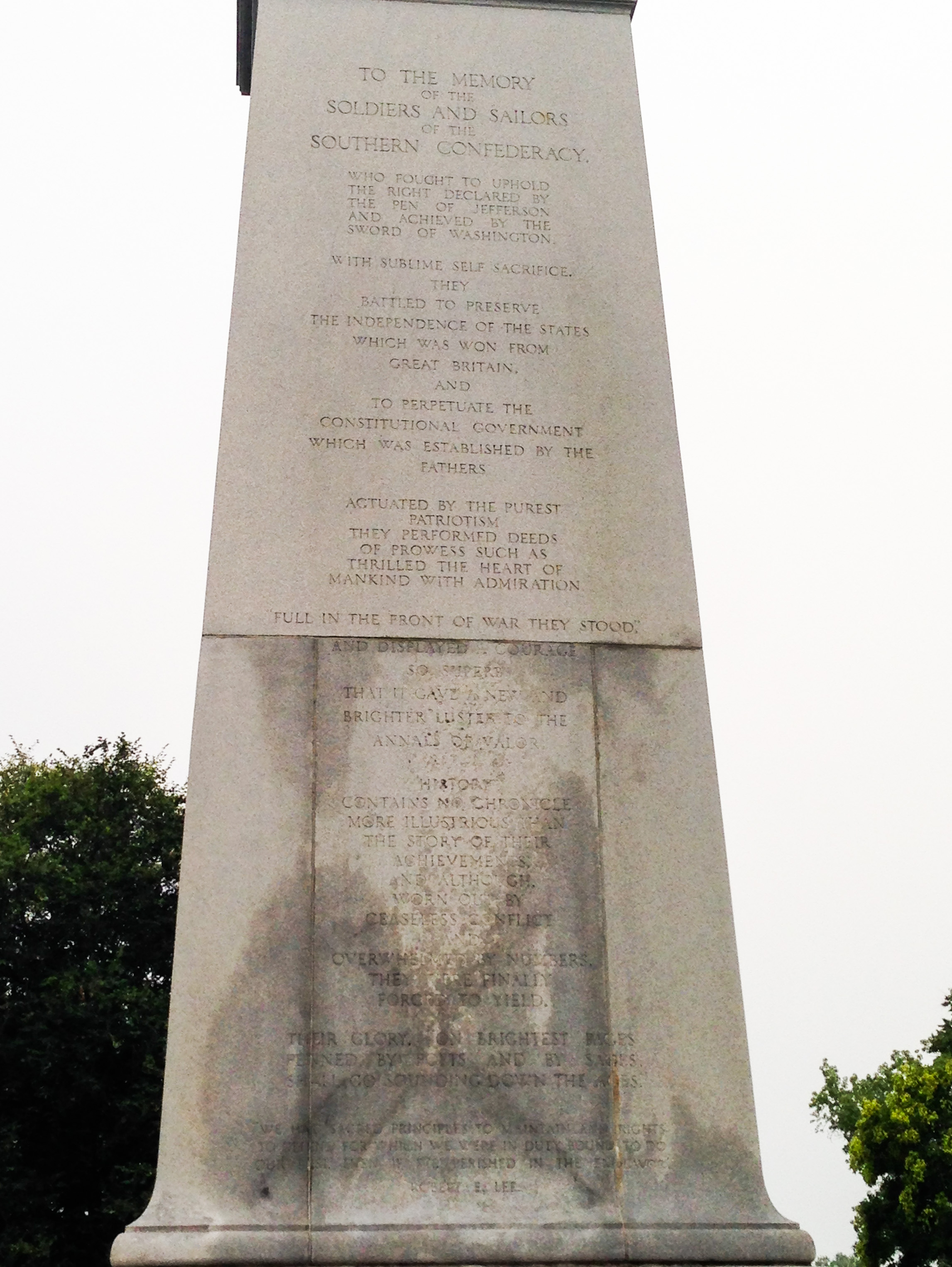
- One view of the Memorial to the Confederate Dead in Forest Park, June 2015
- Interactive map of Memorial to the Confederate Dead
- Location: St. Louis, Missouri, United States
- Coordinates: 38.644317°N 90.279642°W

The Memorial to the Confederate Dead is a Confederate memorial in Missouri.

Around 1899, the Ladies’ Confederate Monument Association began raising funds to erect a monument in St. Louis to soldiers who had fought against the United States. After some $23,000 ($434,619 today) was raised, mostly from the United Daughters of the Confederacy, the monument was installed in Forest Park, the city's largest park. It was dedicated on December 4, 1914.

It was rededicated in 1964 on its 50th anniversary.

In 2015, St. Louis Mayor Francis Slay launched an effort to have the monument removed. He appointed a committee of business and civic interests, which later that year recommended its removal.

in June 2017, the monument was removed from Forest Park, one of at least 36 Confederate memorials removed that year from locations around the country.

As of 2022, it awaits a new home outside St. Louis City and County limits, per an agreement between the city and Missouri Civil War Museum in Jefferson Barracks.

== See also ==
- List of Confederate monuments and memorials
- Removal of Confederate monuments and memorials
