= 1978 St. Louis Tennis Classic =

- Date: February 6–12
- Edition: 8th
- Category: Grand Prix (WCT)
- Draw: 32S / 16D
- Prize money: $175,000
- Surface: Carpet / indoor
- Location: St. Louis, Missouri, United States
- Venue: Checkerdome
- Attendance: 38,425

Champions

Singles
- (United States) Sandy Mayer

Doubles
- (South Africa) Bob Hewitt / (South Africa) Frew McMillan
- St. Louis WCT

The 1978 St. Louis Tennis Classic, also known as the St. Louis WCT, was a men's professional tennis tournament that was part of the World Championship Tennis series of tournaments that were incorporated into the 1978 Grand Prix circuit. It was played on indoor carpet courts at the Checkerdome in St. Louis, Missouri in the United States. It was the eighth and last edition of the tournament and was held from February 6 through February 12, 1978. Unseeded Sandy Mayer won the singles title and earned $30,000 first-prize money.

== Finals ==
=== Singles ===
(United States) Sandy Mayer defeated (Australia) John Alexander 7–6^{(7–3)}, 6–4

- It was Mayer's only singles title of the year and the 8th of his career.

=== Doubles ===
(South Africa) Bob Hewitt / (South Africa) Frew McMillan defeated (Poland) Wojciech Fibak / (Netherlands) Tom Okker 6–3, 6–2

- It was Hewitt's 3rd doubles title of the year and the 43rd of his career. It was McMillan's 4th doubles title of the year and the 51st of his career.
