= 1976 St. Louis Tennis Classic =

- Date: February 17–22
- Edition: 6th
- Category: World Championship Tennis (WCT)
- Draw: 16S / 8D
- Prize money: $60,000
- Surface: Carpet / indoor (Supreme)
- Location: St. Louis, Missouri, United States
- Venue: Kiel Auditorium

Champions

Singles
- (Argentina) Guillermo Vilas

Doubles
- (United States) Brian Gottfried / (Mexico) Raúl Ramírez
- St. Louis WCT

The 1976 St. Louis Tennis Classic, also known as the St. Louis WCT, was a men's professional tennis tournament that was part of the Blue Group of the 1976 World Championship Tennis circuit. It was played on indoor carpet courts at the Kiel Auditorium in St. Louis, Missouri in the United States. It was the sixth edition of the tournament and was held from February 17 through February 22, 1976. First-seeded Guillermo Vilas won the singles title and earned $17,000 first-prize money.

== Finals ==
=== Singles ===
(Argentina) Guillermo Vilas defeated (India) Vijay Amritraj 4–6, 6–0, 6–4

- It was Vilas' 1st singles title of the year and the 14th of his career.

=== Doubles ===
(United States) Brian Gottfried / (Mexico) Raúl Ramírez defeated (Australia) John Alexander / (Australia) Phil Dent 6–4, 6–2
