= 1973 Holton Tennis Classic =

- Date: March 26 – April 1
- Edition: 3rd
- Category: World Championship Tennis (WCT)
- Draw: 32S / 16D
- Prize money: $50,000
- Surface: Carpet / indoor
- Location: St. Louis, Missouri, United States
- Venue: Kiel Auditorium

Champions

Singles
- (United States) Stan Smith

Doubles
- (Sweden) Ove Nils Bengtson / (United States) Jim McManus
- St. Louis WCT

The 1973 Holton Tennis Classic, also known as the St. Louis WCT, was a men's professional tennis tournament that was part of Group A of the 1973 World Championship Tennis circuit. It was held on indoor carpet courts at the Kiel Auditorium in St. Louis, Missouri in the United States. It was the third edition of the tournament and was held from March 26 through April 1, 1973. Second-seeded Stan Smith won the singles title and earned $10,000 first-prize money.

== Finals ==
=== Singles ===
(United States) Stan Smith defeated (Australia) Rod Laver 6–4, 3–6, 6–4

- It was Smith' 3rd singles title of the year and the 38th of his career in the Open Era.

=== Doubles ===
(Sweden) Ove Nils Bengtson / (United States) Jim McManus defeated (Australia) Terry Addison / (Australia) Colin Dibley 6–2, 7–5
