= St. Louis WCT =

Defunct tennis tournament
- Tour: WCT Tour
- Founded: 1970
- Abolished: 1978
- Editions: 8
- Location: St. Louis, Missouri, United States
- Surface: Carpet / indoor Clay / outdoor (1974–75)

The St. Louis WCT was a men's tennis tournament played in St. Louis, Missouri from 1970 to 1978. The event was part of the WCT Tour and was held on indoor carpet courts except from 1974 to 1975, when it was held on outdoor clay courts.

The inaugural 1970 edition was sponsored by the Rawling's Sporting Goods Company; the event's title name was the Rawling's Tennis Classic.

The following year 1971 the company sponsored another indoor WCT event the Dallas Tennis Classic as the Rawlings Classic Dallas.

From 1972 to 1974 the Holton Capital Group was the event main sponsors.

== Finals ==
=== Singles ===
| Year | Champions | Runners-up | Score |
|---|---|---|---|
| 1970 | (Australia) Rod Laver | (Australia) Ken Rosewall | 6–1, 6–4 |
| 1971 | Not held | | |
| 1972 | (Australia) John Newcombe | (Socialist Federal Republic of Yugoslavia) Nikola Pilić | 6–3, 6–3 |
| 1973 | (United States) Stan Smith | (Australia) Rod Laver | 6–4, 3–6, 6–4 |
| 1974 | (United States) Stan Smith | (Soviet Union) Alex Metreveli | 6–2, 3–6, 6–2 |
| 1975 | (United States) Vitas Gerulaitis | (United States) Roscoe Tanner | 2–6, 6–2, 6–3 |
| 1976 | (Argentina) Guillermo Vilas | (India) Vijay Amritraj | 4–6, 6–0, 6–4 |
| 1977 | (United States) Jimmy Connors | (Australia) John Alexander | 7–6^{(7–4)}, 6–2 |
| 1978 | (United States) Sandy Mayer | (United States) Eddie Dibbs | 7–6, 6–4 |

=== Doubles ===
| Year | Champions | Runners-up | Score |
|---|---|---|---|
| 1970 | (Spain) Andrés Gimeno (Australia) John Newcombe | (Australia) Roy Emerson (Australia) Rod Laver | 6–4, 6–0 |
| 1971 | Not held | | |
| 1972 | (Australia) John Newcombe (Australia) Tony Roche | (Australia) John Alexander (Australia) Phil Dent | 7–6, 3–6, 6–4 |
| 1973 | (Sweden) Ove Nils Bengtson (United States) Jim McManus | (Australia) Terry Addison (Australia) Colin Dibley | 6–2, 7–5 |
| 1974 | (Egypt) Ismail El Shafei (New Zealand) Brian Fairlie | (Australia) Ross Case (Australia) Geoff Masters | 7–6, 6–7, 7–6 |
| 1975 | (Australia) Colin Dibley (Australia) Ray Ruffels | (Australia) Ross Case (Australia) Geoff Masters | 6–4, 6–4 |
| 1976 | (United States) Brian Gottfried (Mexico) Raúl Ramírez | (Australia) John Alexander (Australia) Phil Dent | 6–4, 6–2 |
| 1977 | (Romania) Ilie Năstase (Italy) Adriano Panatta | (India) Vijay Amritraj (United States) Dick Stockton | 6–4, 3–6, 7–6 |
| 1978 | (South Africa) Bob Hewitt (South Africa) Frew McMillan | (Poland) Wojciech Fibak (Netherlands) Tom Okker | 6–3, 6–2 |
