= Dwight Davis Tennis Center =

Missouri tennis facility

Coordinates: 38.6427°N 90.2848°W

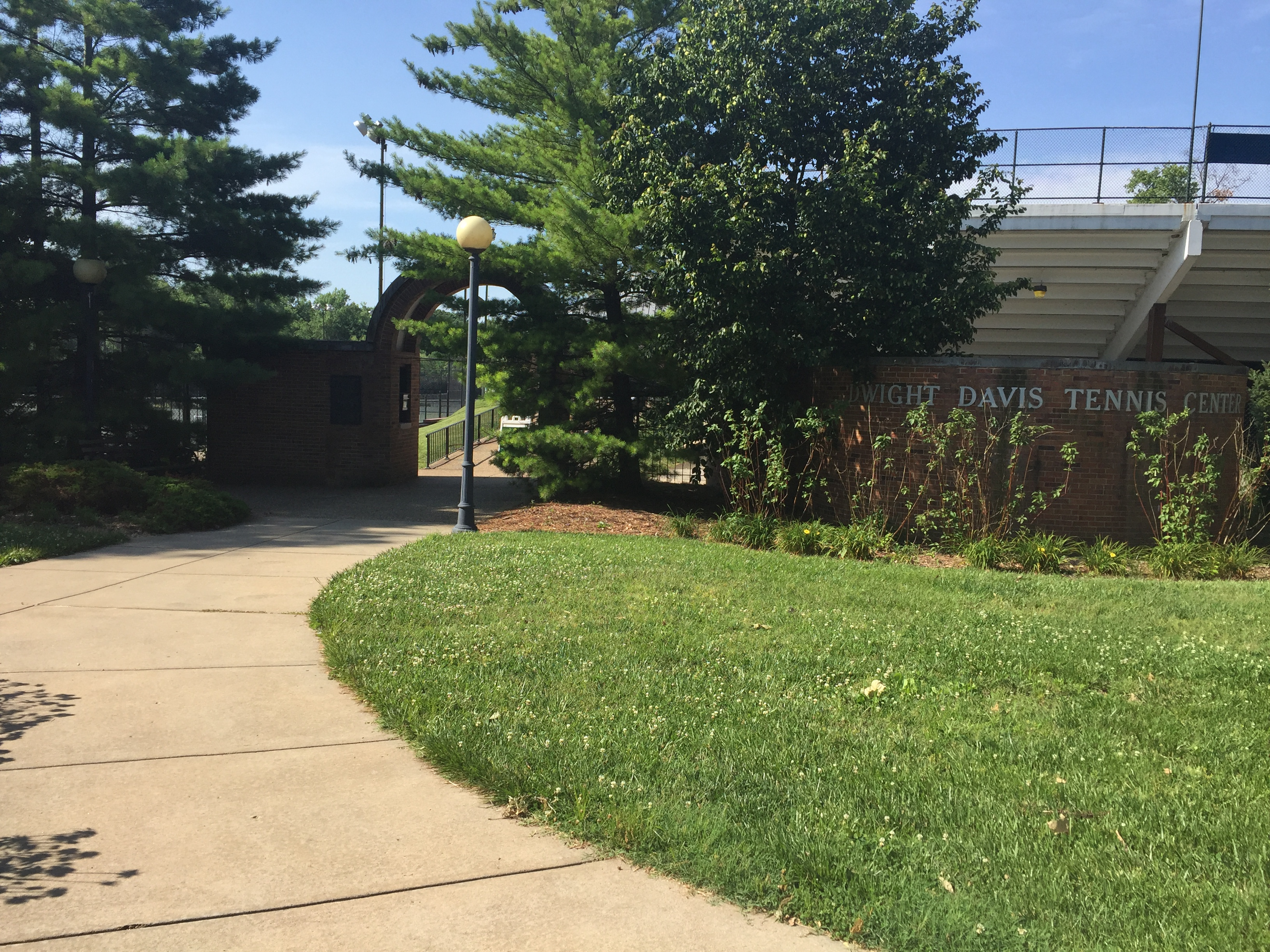
Dwight Davis Tennis Center

Dwight Davis Tennis Center is a public tennis facility in Forest Park, St. Louis, Missouri. The center has 18 lighted tennis courts and 4 pickleball courts. The pickleball courts were added in 2017 and are painted on its Stadium Court which has adjacent seating for 1,100 spectators. The tennis courts formerly at this location were called the Jefferson Memorial courts. In 1966, the Jefferson Memorial courts were renovated, expanded and renamed the Dwight Davis Tennis Courts in honor of prominent St. Louis politician and namesake of the Davis Cup, Dwight F. Davis.

The site was one of several St. Louis sites featured in the book of archival photographs titled "Forest Park: The Jewel of St. Louis", published by St. Louis Post-Dispatch Books.

Dwight Davis Tennis Center is a 501(c) nonprofit. It was first registered with the State of Missouri in 1964 by founders S.E. Freund, Harry G, Burrus, Harry Lueke and Thomas W. White. Apted-Hulling Inc. took over management of the Dwight Davis Tennis Center in April 2004. Dwight Davis Tennis Center hosted the World Team Tennis Tour and was the home court for the St. Louis Aces. Apted-Hulling purchased the St. Louis Aces in 2004 and the team later folded effective January 1, 2012 after Apted-Hulling was unable to find a buyer for the franchise.
