= 1968 Men's National Tennis League =

1968 Men's NTL League
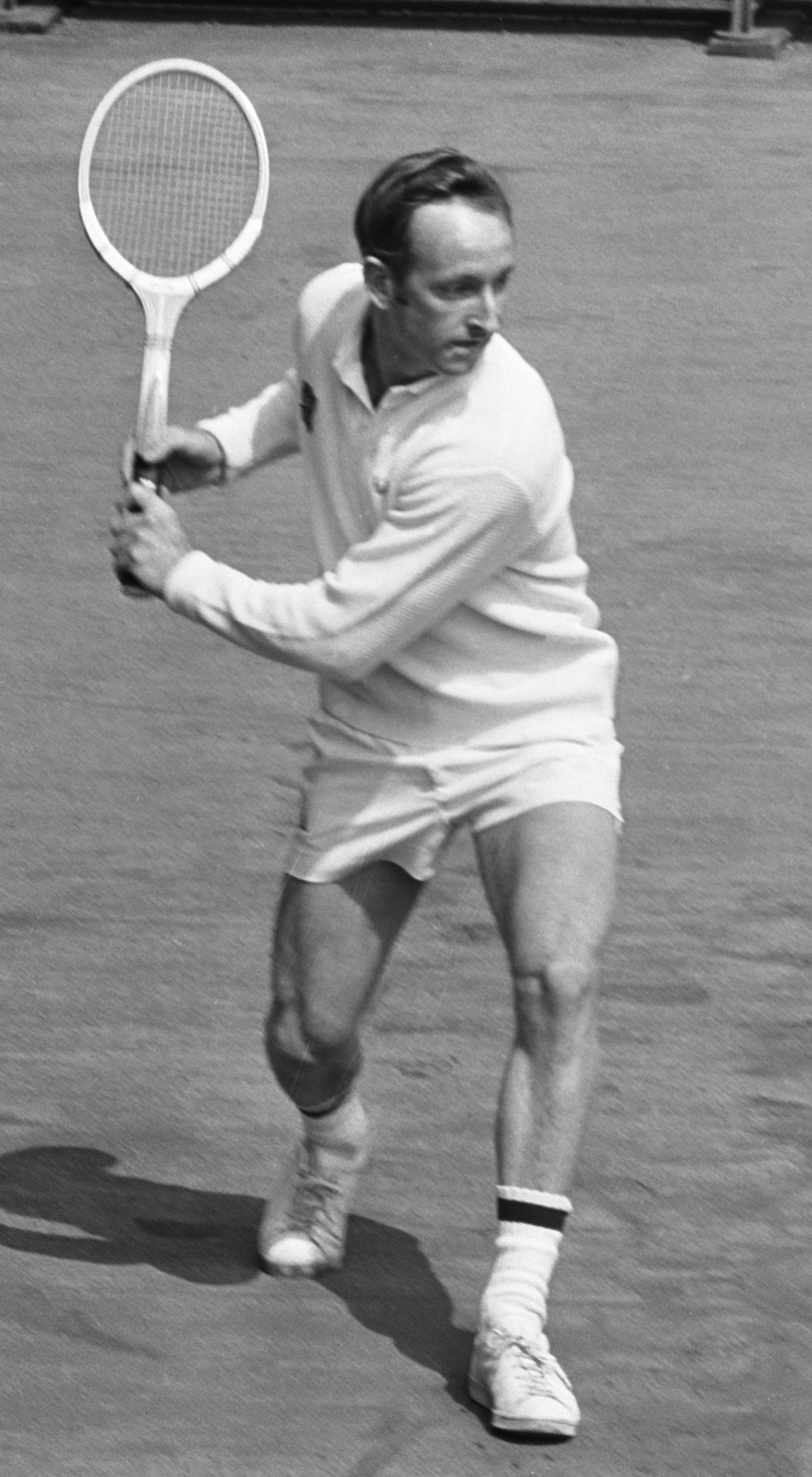
- Laver won most title's this year

Details
- Duration: 18 March – 2 November
- Edition: 1st
- Tournaments: 18
- Categories: (Pro)

Achievements (singles)
- Most titles: (Australia) Rod Laver (7)
- Most finals: (Australia) Rod Laver (8)

The 1968 Men's National Tennis League (NTL) was the inaugural series of professional tennis tournaments founded by George McCall, among others: Rod Laver, Roy Emerson, Ken Rosewall, Andrés Gimeno, Pancho Gonzales and Fred Stolle.

== History ==
In 1967 two new professional tennis organizations were formed: the National Tennis League, organized by former U.S. Davis Cup captain George MacCall, and World Championship Tennis (WCT), which was founded by New Orleans promoter Dave Dixon and funded by Dallas oil and football tycoon Lamar Hunt. At the time the two professional tours signed a significant number of the world’s top players, professional and amateur.

In 1968 Men's National Tennis League offered prize money totaling US$400,000. It began in March with the opening tournament held in São Paulo, Brazil that was won by Rod Laver and ended with the final tournament held in Lima, Peru in November that was won by Fred Stolle.

== Legend ==
Key

- Q = Qualifier
- WC = Wild card
- LL = Lucky loser
- Alt = Alternate
- ITF = ITF entry
- PR = Protected ranking
- SR = Special ranking
- SE = Special exempt
- JE = Junior exempt
- JR = Junior Accelerator Programme entrant
- CO = College Accelerator Programme entrant
- NG = Next Gen Accelerator Program entrant
- w/o = Walkover
- r = Retired
- d = Defaulted

== Calendar ==
This is the complete schedule of events on the 1968 National Tennis League, with player progression partially documented until the quarterfinals stage.

=== March ===
Week	Tournament	Champions	Runners-up	Semifinalists	Quarterfinalists
18 Mar	São Paulo Pro Championships; São Paulo, Brazil; Clay (i); Singles	(Australia) Rod Laver; 7–5, 5–7, 6–4	(United States) Pancho Gonzales		
23 Mar	Buenos Aires Pro Championships; Buenos Aires, Argentina; Clay; Singles	(Australia) Rod Laver; 7–5, 5–7, 6–4	(United States) Pancho Gonzales	(Spain) Andrés Gimeno (3rd) (Australia) Fred Stolle (4th)	
27 Mar	NTL Bogotá Pro Championships; Bogotà, Colombia; Clay (i); Singles - Doubles	(Spain) Andrés Gimeno; 11–13, 6–3, 6–4	(Australia) Fred Stolle	(Australia) Rod Laver (3rd) (United States) Pancho Gonzales (4th)	
27 Mar	NTL Bogotá Pro Championships; Bogotà, Colombia; Clay (i); Singles - Doubles	(Australia) Rod Laver (Australia) Fred Stolle; 10–5	(Spain) Andrés Gimeno (United States) Pancho Gonzales	(Australia) Rod Laver (3rd) (United States) Pancho Gonzales (4th)	

=== April ===
Week	Tournament	Champions	Runners-up	Semifinalists	Quarterfinalists
10 Apr	NTL Hollywood Pro Challenge Cup; Hollywood, United States; Clay; Singles	(Australia) Roy Emerson; 6–1, 6–1	(Australia) Ken Rosewall	(United States) Pancho Gonzales (3rd) (Australia) Rod Laver (4th)	(South Africa) John Hammill (United States) Crawford Henry (Cuba) Rey Garrido (Australia) Peter Cawthorn
18 Apr	BBC2 World Pro Invitation Championships; Wembley, Great Britain; Carpet (i); Singles	(Australia) Rod Laver; 6–3, 10–8	(Australia) Ken Rosewall	(Australia) Roy Emerson (United States) Pancho Gonzales	
20 Apr	NTL Paris Pro Championships; Paris, France; Clay	(Australia) Ken Rosewall; 6–3, 6–4	(Spain) Andrés Gimeno	(United States) Pancho Gonzales (Australia) Rod Laver	(Australia) Fred Stolle (Australia) Roy Emerson

=== May ===
Week	Tournament	Champions	Runners-up	Semifinalists	Quarterfinalists
5 May	NTL Wembley Invitation; Wembley, Great Britain; Wood (i)	(Australia) Rod Laver; 6–0, 6–1, 6–0	(Australia) Ken Rosewall		
5 May	NTL Wembley Invitation; Wembley, Great Britain; Wood (i)	(Australia) Rod Laver (Australia) Roy Emerson; 12–10, 6–4	(Spain) Andrés Gimeno (United States) Pancho Gonzales		
18 May	NTL Madison Square Garden Pro Championships; New York City, United States; Carpet (i); Singles - Doubles	(Australia) Rod Laver; 4–6, 6–3, 9–7, 6–4	(Australia) Ken Rosewall	(Australia) Roy Emerson (Spain) Andrés Gimeno	(Australia) Lew Hoad (United States) Pancho Gonzales (Peru) Alex Olmedo (Australia) Fred Stolle

=== July ===
Week	Tournament	Champions	Runners-up	Semifinalists	Quarterfinalists
20 Jul	NTL Los Angeles Pro Championships; Los Angeles, United States; Carpet (i)	(United States) Pancho Gonzales; 1–6, 6–3, 6–4	(Australia) Rod Laver	(Australia) Roy Emerson (Australia) Ken Rosewall	
25 Jul	NTL Oakland Pro Championships; Oakland Coliseum Arena; Oakland, United States; Carpet (i)	(Australia) Fred Stolle; 7–5, 6–3	(United States) Pancho Gonzales	(Australia) Roy Emerson	
25 Jul	NTL Oakland Pro Championships; Oakland Coliseum Arena; Oakland, United States; Carpet (i)	(United States) Rosie Casals (Australia) Fred Stolle; 7–5, 6–3	(France) Françoise Dürr (United States) Pancho Gonzales	(Australia) Roy Emerson	

=== August ===
Week	Tournament	Champions	Runners-up	Semifinalists	Quarterfinalists
11 Aug	NTL Masters Championships; Highland Racquet & Riding Club; Binghamton, United States; Carpet (i)	(Spain) Andrés Gimeno; 6–4, 6–1	(Australia) Fred Stolle	(Australia) Roy Emerson (Australia) Rod Laver	
11 Aug	NTL Masters Championships; Highland Racquet & Riding Club; Binghamton, United States; Carpet (i)	(Australia) Rod Laver (Australia) Fred Stolle; 3–6, 6–3, 6–4	(Australia) Roy Emerson (Spain) Andrés Gimeno	(Australia) Roy Emerson (Australia) Rod Laver	
18 Aug	NTL Colonial Pro Championships; Highland Racquet & Riding Club; Fort Worth, United States	(Australia) Ken Rosewall; 6–4, 6–2	(Spain) Andrés Gimeno	(Australia) Mal Anderson (Australia) Fred Stolle	(United States) Tut Bartzen (Australia) Roy Emerson (United States) Pancho Gonzales (Australia) Rod Laver
18 Aug	NTL Colonial Pro Championships; Highland Racquet & Riding Club; Fort Worth, United States	(Australia) Ken Rosewall (Australia) Fred Stolle; 10–8, 6–4	(Australia) Roy Emerson (Australia) Rod Laver	(Australia) Mal Anderson (Australia) Fred Stolle	(United States) Tut Bartzen (Australia) Roy Emerson (United States) Pancho Gonzales (Australia) Rod Laver

=== September ===
Week	Tournament	Champions	Runners-up	Semifinalists	Quarterfinalists
30 Sep	NTL Midland Championships; Midland, Texas, United States; Singles - Doubles	(United States) Pancho Gonzales; 7–5, 6–3	(Australia) Roy Emerson	(Spain) Andrés Gimeno (Australia) Rod Laver	(United States) Pancho Segura (Australia) Fred Stolle
30 Sep	NTL Midland Championships; Midland, Texas, United States; Singles - Doubles	(Spain) Andrés Gimeno (United States) Pancho Gonzales; 6–4, 3–6, 6–4	(Australia) Roy Emerson (Australia) Rod Laver	(Spain) Andrés Gimeno (Australia) Rod Laver	(United States) Pancho Segura (Australia) Fred Stolle

=== October ===
Week	Tournament	Champions	Runners-up	Semifinalists	Quarterfinalists
7 Oct	NTL South Texas Pro Championships; Corpus Christi, United States; Singles - Doubles	(Australia) Rod Laver; 6–2, 6–4	(Spain) Andrés Gimeno	(Australia) Roy Emerson (Australia) Fred Stolle	(United States) Pancho Gonzales (United States) Pancho Segura
7 Oct	NTL South Texas Pro Championships; Corpus Christi, United States; Singles - Doubles	Doubles final cancelled due to rain		(Australia) Roy Emerson (Australia) Fred Stolle	(United States) Pancho Gonzales (United States) Pancho Segura

=== November ===
Week	Tournament	Champions	Runners-up	Semifinalists	Quarterfinalists
3 Nov	NTL Lima Pro Championships; Lima, Peru; Clay	(Australia) Fred Stolle; 3–0 matches	Round Robin (Spain) Andrés Gimeno (Australia) Rod Laver (Australia) Roy Emerson		
6 Nov	NTL La Paz Pro Round Robin; La Paz, Bolivia; Clay	(Australia) Rod Laver; 3–0 matches	Round Robin (Spain) Andrés Gimeno (Australia) Fred Stolle (Australia) Roy Emerson		
8 Nov	São Paulo Pro Championships; São Paulo, Brazil; Clay (i); Singles	(Australia) Rod Laver; 3–0 matches	Round Robin (Spain) Andrés Gimeno (Australia) Fred Stolle (Australia) Roy Emerson		
10 Nov	NTL French Tour; Lyon & Marseille, France; Clay	(Australia) Ken Rosewall (won Lyon event) (United States) Pancho Gonzales (won Marseille event) joint 1st			

== Prize money ==
=== Men's ===
NTL official earnings
#	Player	$US
1	(Australia) Rod Laver	70,359
2	(Australia) Ken Rosewall	61,307
3	(United States) Pancho Gonzales	38,987
4	(Spain) Andrés Gimeno	36,524
5	(Australia) Roy Emerson	35,188
6	(Australia) Fred Stolle	34,335

== See also ==
- 1968 World Championship Tennis circuit
