= 1969 World Championship Tennis circuit =

1969 WCT circuit
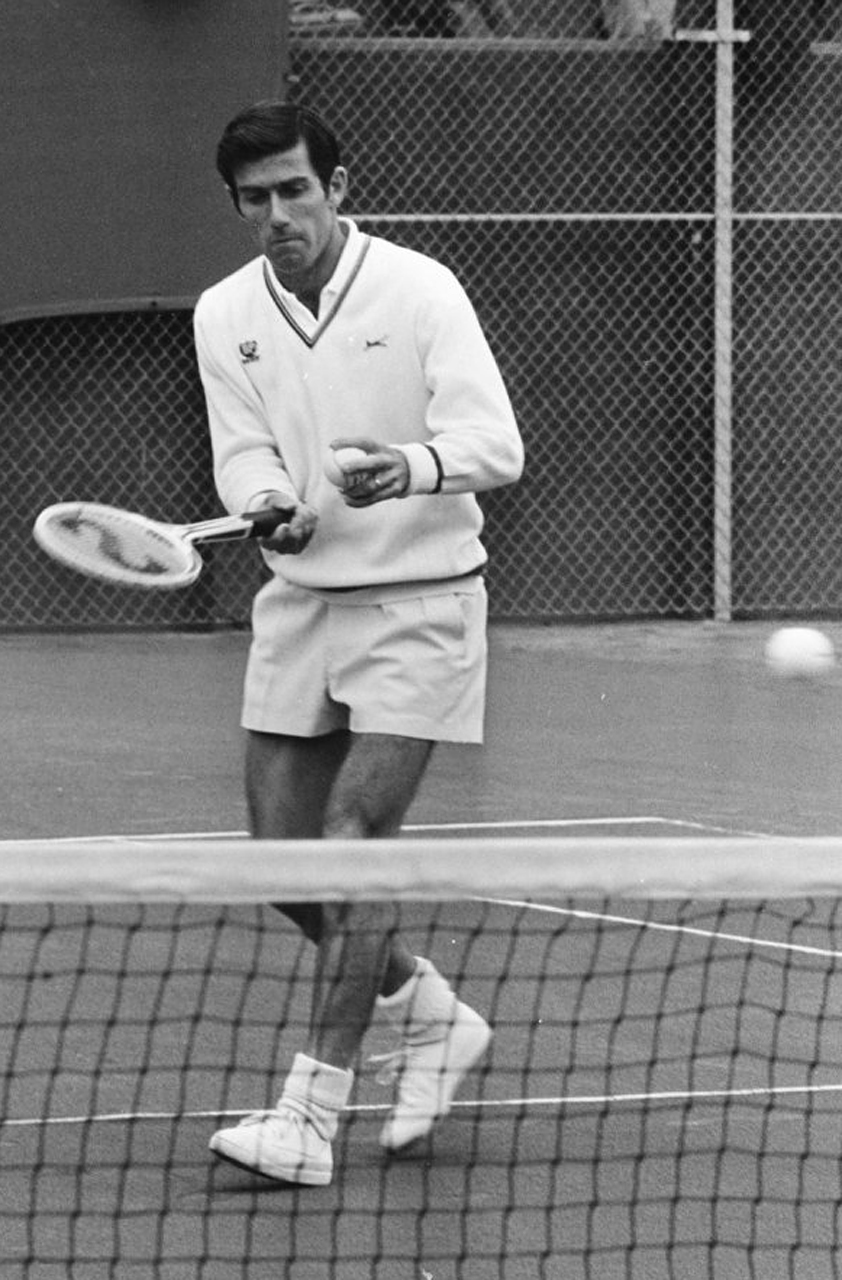
- Rosewall in 1970 one of the three title winners this year

Details
- Duration: February 3, 1969 – April 29, 1969
- Edition: 2nd
- Tournaments: 4

Achievements (singles)
- Most titles: Two players (1)

The 1969 World Championship Tennis circuit was the second edition of the (WCT) one of the two rival professional male tennis tours of 1969 the other being the 1969 Men's National Tennis League. The tour began on February 3 in Philadelphia, United States and ended on April 29 in Midland, Texas, United States.

== Calendar ==
=== Legend ===
Regular series

=== February ===
Date	Tournament	Winner	Finalist	Semifinalist	Quarter finalist
February 3–9	Philadelphia International Indoor Open Championships; Philadelphia, United States; Carpet (i); Singles – Doubles	(Australia) Rod Laver; 7–5, 6–4, 6–4	(Australia) Tony Roche	(Australia) Ken Rosewall (Netherlands) Tom Okker	(United States) Charlie Pasarell (Spain) Andrés Gimeno (United States) Pancho Gonzales (Czechoslovakia) Jan Kodeš
February 3–9	Philadelphia International Indoor Open Championships; Philadelphia, United States; Carpet (i); Singles – Doubles	(Netherlands) Tom Okker (United States) Marty Riessen; 8–6, 6–4	(Australia) John Newcombe (Australia) Tony Roche	(Australia) Ken Rosewall (Netherlands) Tom Okker	(United States) Charlie Pasarell (Spain) Andrés Gimeno (United States) Pancho Gonzales (Czechoslovakia) Jan Kodeš

=== May ===
Date	Tournament	Winner	Finalist	Semifinalist	Quarter finalist
April 29 – May 5	1969 WCT Midland; Midland, United States; Singles – Doubles	(Australia) Ken Rosewall; 5–7, 6–1, 7–5	(United States) Pancho Gonzales	(Spain) Andrés Gimeno (Australia) Fred Stolle	

=== October ===
Date	Tournament	Champions	Runners-up	Semifinalists	Quarterfinalists
3 Oct	Tucson (WCT); Tucson, United States; Hard	(Australia) Tony Roche; 9–7, 6–1	(Netherlands) Tom Okker	3rd Place (United States) Marty Riessen 4th Place (United States) Butch Buchholz	(South Africa) Raymond Moore (France) Pierre Barthès (Socialist Federal Republic of Yugoslavia) Nikola Pilić (United Kingdom) Roger Taylor

== See also ==
- 1969 Men's National Tennis League

== Sources ==
- Association of Tennis Professionals:Results archive 1969
- Gitlin, Marty (2011). Billie Jean King: Tennis Star & Social Activist: Tennis Star & Social Activist. ABDO. ISBN 9781617149467.
