= 1969 Men's National Tennis League =

1969 Men's NTL League
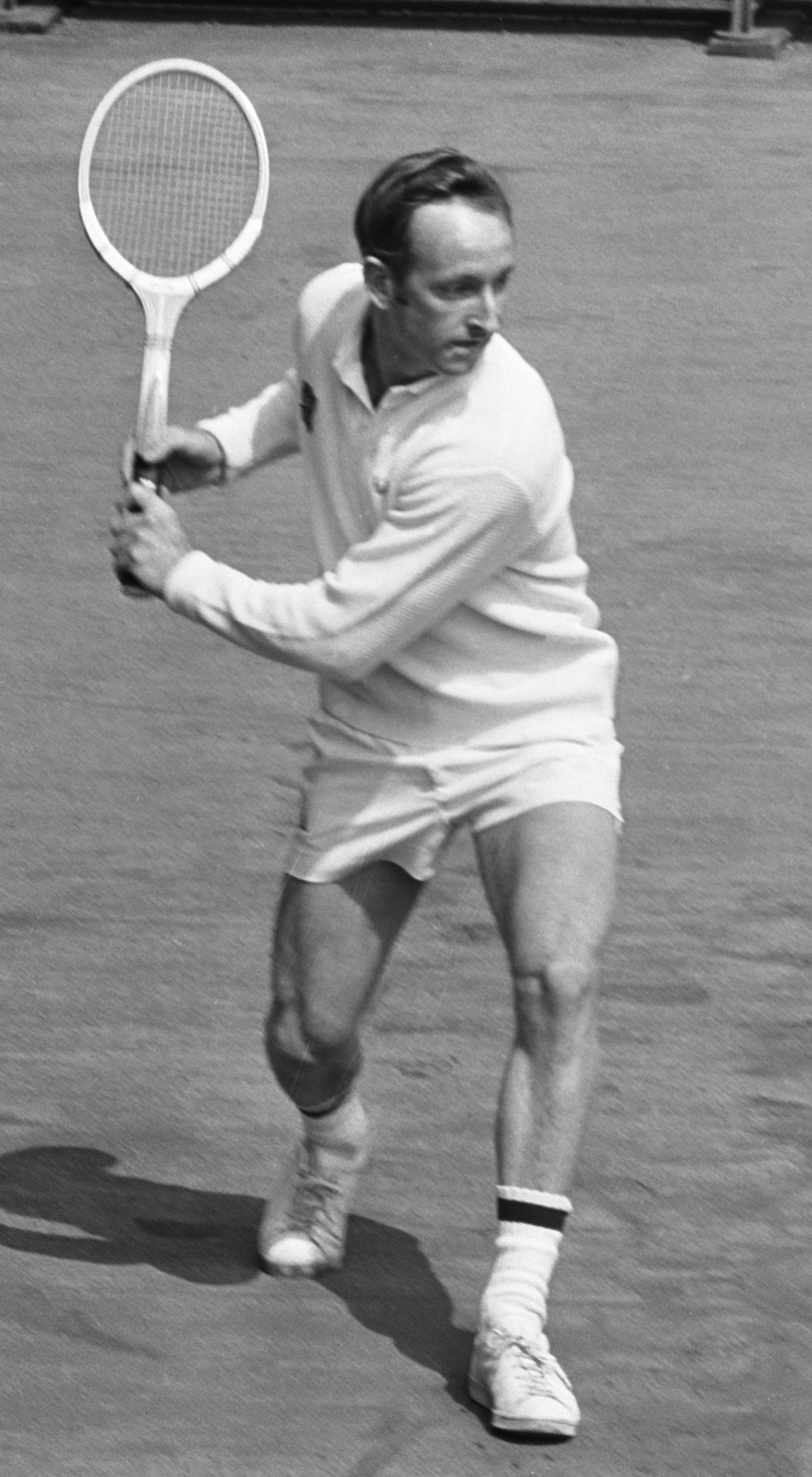
- Laver won most title's this year

Details
- Duration: 12 February – 28 October
- Edition: 2nd
- Tournaments: 9
- Categories: (Pro)

Achievements (singles)
- Most titles: (Australia) Rod Laver (6)
- Most finals: (Australia) Rod Laver (7)

The 1969 Men's National Tennis League (NTL) was the final edition of the tour founded by George MacCall the league and players contracts were bought by World Championship Tennis. The tour started in Orlando, United States, 12 February and finished in Cologne, West Germany, 20 October 1969.

== Legend ==
Pro tournaments
Regular tournaments

Key

- Q = Qualifier
- WC = Wild card
- LL = Lucky loser
- Alt = Alternate
- ITF = ITF entry
- PR = Protected ranking
- SR = Special ranking
- SE = Special exempt
- JE = Junior exempt
- JR = Junior Accelerator Programme entrant
- CO = College Accelerator Programme entrant
- NG = Next Gen Accelerator Program entrant
- w/o = Walkover
- r = Retired
- d = Defaulted

== Calendar ==
This is the complete schedule of events on the 1969 National Tennis League, with player progression partially documented until the quarterfinals stage.

=== February ===
Week	Tournament	Champions	Runners-up	Semifinalists	Quarterfinalists
10 Feb	Orlando Invitational Pro Championships; Orlando, Florida, United States; Clay	(Australia) Rod Laver; 6–3, 6–2	(Australia) Ken Rosewall	(United States) Pancho Gonzales (Australia) Roy Emerson	k.o. 4 players only
10 Feb	Orlando Invitational Pro Championships; Orlando, Florida, United States; Clay	(Australia) Rod Laver (Australia) Roy Emerson; 6–4, 6–2	(United States) Pancho Gonzales (Australia) Roy Emerson	(United States) Pancho Gonzales (Australia) Roy Emerson	k.o. 4 players only
10 Feb	Hollywood Pro Championships; Hollywood, United States	(Australia) Tony Roche; 6–3, 9–7, 6–4	(Australia) Rod Laver	(Spain) Andrés Gimeno (Netherlands) Tom Okker	(United States) Butch Buchholz (Australia) Roy Emerson (Australia) John Newcombe (Australia) Ken Rosewall
24 Feb	Oakland Pro Championships; Oakland, United States	(Australia) Tony Roche; 4–6, 6–4, 11–9	(Australia) Rod Laver	(United States) Marty Riessen (Australia) Ken Rosewall	(United States) Pancho Gonzales (Australia) John Newcombe (United States) Dennis Ralston (Australia) Fred Stolle

=== March ===
Date	Tournament	Winner	Finalist	Semifinalist	Quarterfinalist
3–8 Mar	NTL Los Angeles Pro Championships; Los Angeles, United States; Carpet (i)	(Australia) Rod Laver; 6–4, 10–8	(United States) Marty Riessen	(Australia) Roy Emerson (Australia) John Newcombe	(South Africa) Raymond Moore (United States) Dennis Ralston (Australia) Ken Rosewall (Australia) Fred Stolle

=== August ===
Date	Tournament	Winner	Finalist	Semifinalist	Quarterfinalist
6 Aug	St. Louis Pro Championships; St. Louis, United States; Hard	(Australia) Rod Laver; 7–5, 3–6, 7–5	(Australia) Fred Stolle		
4–10 Aug	Binghamton Pro Masters; Binghamton, United States; Clay	(Australia) Rod Laver; 6–1, 6–2	(United States) Pancho Gonzales	(United States) Pancho Segura (Australia) Fred Stolle; Round robin	Round robin
11–17 Aug	Colonial Pro Invitation; Fort Worth, United States; Hard	(Australia) Rod Laver; 6–3, 6–2	(Australia) Ken Rosewall	(Netherlands) Tom Okker (Australia) Tony Roche	(France) Pierre Barthès (United States) Butch Buchholz (United States) Ronald Holmberg (South Africa) Raymond Moore
21 August	NTL Baltimore Pro Championships; Baltimore, United States; Grass	(Australia) Rod Laver; 6–3, 3–6, 6–3, 3–6, 9–7	(United States) Pancho Gonzales	3rd place (Australia) Fred Stolle 4th place (Australia) Roy Emerson	Round robin (Australia) Ken Rosewall (Spain) Andrés Gimeno

=== October ===
Date	Tournament	Winner	Finalist	Semifinalist	Quarterfinalist
18–20 Oct	Spoga Cup; Cologne, West Germany	(Spain) Andrés Gimeno; 6–3, 19–17	(Australia) Roy Emerson	(United States) Marty Riessen (Australia) Ken Rosewall	(France) Pierre Barthès (Australia) Rod Laver (Netherlands) Tom Okker (Australia) Tony Roche
18–20 Oct	Spoga Cup; Cologne, West Germany	(France) Pierre Barthès (Australia) Tony Roche; 10–7	(Spain) Andrés Gimeno (Australia) Ken Rosewall	(United States) Marty Riessen (Australia) Ken Rosewall	(France) Pierre Barthès (Australia) Rod Laver (Netherlands) Tom Okker (Australia) Tony Roche

== Prize money rankings ==
Rank	Name	Period	Prize money
1.	(Australia) Rod Laver	30 weeks	$123,405
2.	(Australia) Roy Emerson	30 weeks	$62,655
3.	(Australia) Ken Rosewall	20 weeks	$46,800
4.	(United States) Pancho Gonzales	22 weeks	$46,320
5.	(Australia) Fred Stolle	28 weeks	$43,115
6.	(Spain) Andrés Gimeno	21 weeks	$35,115

== See also ==
- 1969 World Championship Tennis circuit
- Grand Prix tennis tournaments
- USTA
- International Tennis Federation

== Sources ==
- MacCambridge, Michael (2012). Lamar Hunt: A Life in Sports. Andrews McMeel Publishing. ISBN 9781449423391.
- McCauley, Joe; Trabert, Tony; Collins, Bud (2000). The History of Professional Tennis. The Short Run Book Company Limited. Exeter. England.
- Robertson, Max (1974). Encyclopaedia of Tennis. Allen & Unwin. ISBN 9780047960420.
