= 1968 World Championship Tennis circuit =

1968 WCT circuit
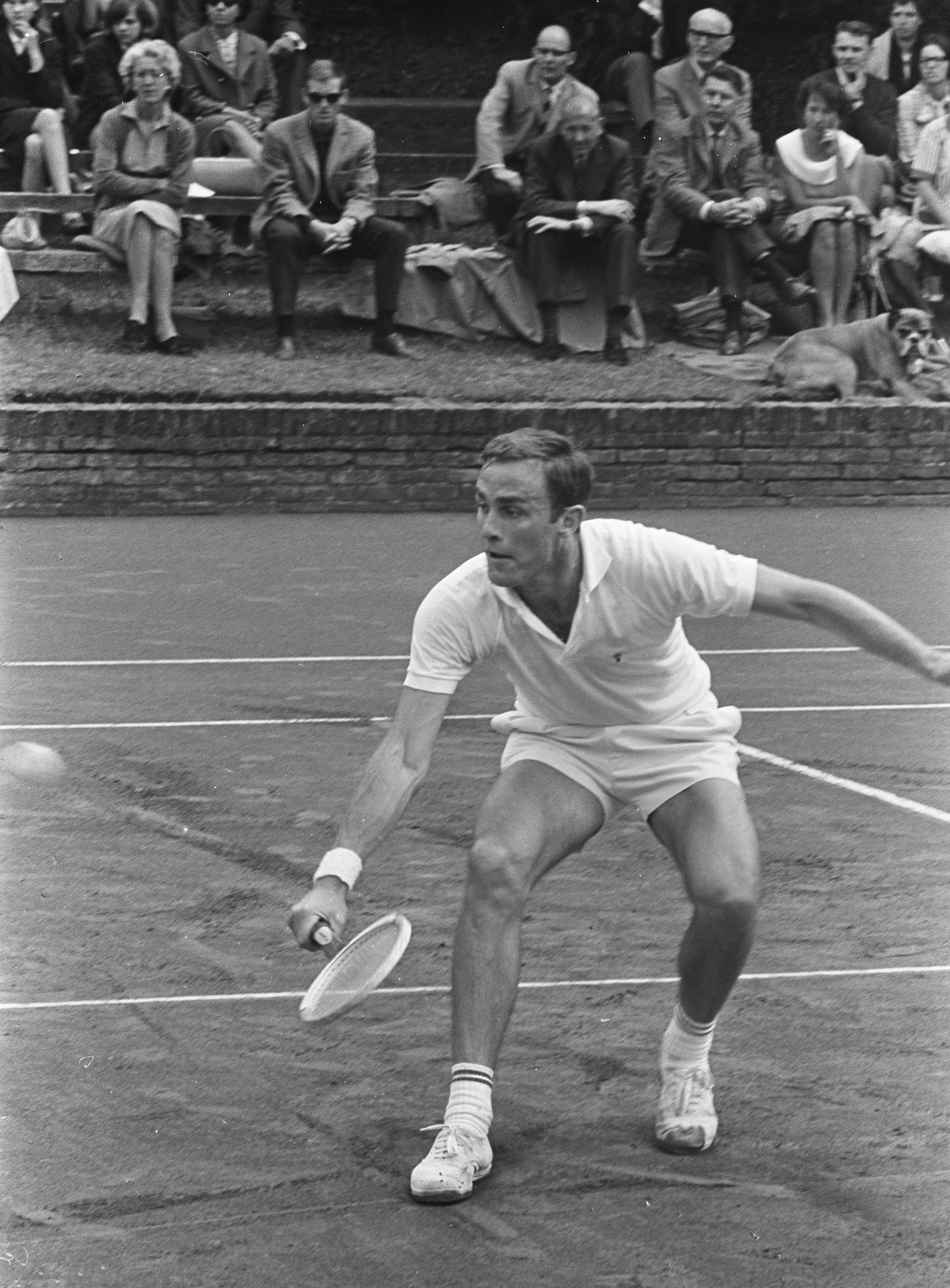
- Newcombe won 7 titles during the tour

Details
- Duration: 20 January 1968 – 8 November 1968
- Edition: 1st
- Tournaments: 27

Achievements (singles)
- Most titles: (Australia) John Newcombe (7)
- Most finals: (United States) Dennis Ralston (10) (Australia) John Newcombe (10)

The 1968 World Championship Tennis circuit was the inaugural tour of the (WCT) one of the two rival professional male tennis tours of 1968 the other being the National Tennis League. The tour began on 22 January in Sydney, Australia and ended on 13 October in Durban, South Africa.

== Calendar ==
This is the complete schedule of events on the 1968 WCT circuit, with player progression documented until the quarterfinals stage.

=== January ===
Week	Tournament	Champions	Runners-up	Semifinalists	Quarterfinalists
20 Jan	1968 New South Wales Pro WCT; Sydney, Australia; Singles – Doubles	(Australia) Tony Roche; 96–33	(Socialist Federal Republic of Yugoslavia) Nikola Pilić	N/A	Round robin (Australia) John Newcombe (South Africa) Cliff Drysdale (United States) Butch Buchholz (United Kingdom) Roger Taylor (France) Pierre Barthès (United States) Dennis Ralston

=== February ===
Week	Tournament	Champions	Runners-up	Semifinalists	Quarterfinalists
1 Feb	1968 WCT World Cup; Kansas City, St Louis, United States	N/A			
8 Feb	1968 Shreveport WCT; Shreveport, United States	(United States) Dennis Ralston; 31–23, 31–25	(United States) Butch Buchholz	(Australia) Tony Roche (Australia) John Newcombe	(South Africa) Cliff Drysdale (France) Pierre Barthès (United Kingdom) Roger Taylor (Socialist Federal Republic of Yugoslavia) Nikola Pilić
9 Feb	WCT Miami Pro Championships; Miami, United States	(United States) Butch Buchholz; 31–22, 31–26	(Australia) Tony Roche	3rd place (France) Pierre Barthès 4th place (South Africa) Cliff Drysdale	(Australia) John Newcombe (Socialist Federal Republic of Yugoslavia) Nikola Pilić (United Kingdom) Roger Taylor (United States) Dennis Ralston
13 Feb	1968 Houston WCT; Houston, United States	(United States) Butch Buchholz; 31-28	(United States) Dennis Ralston	N/A	Round robin (Australia) John Newcombe (South Africa) Cliff Drysdale (United Kingdom) Roger Taylor (France) Pierre Barthès (Socialist Federal Republic of Yugoslavia) Nikola Pilić (Australia) Tony Roche
16 Feb	1968 New Orleans WCT; New Orleans, United States	(South Africa) Cliff Drysdale; 31-29	(Australia) John Newcombe	N/A	Round robin (United States) Butch Buchholz (Australia) Tony Roche (United Kingdom) Roger Taylor (France) Pierre Barthès (Socialist Federal Republic of Yugoslavia) Nikola Pilić (United States) Dennis Ralston
20 Feb	WCT Orlando Pro Championships; Orlando, United States	(United States) Dennis Ralston; 31-28	(Socialist Federal Republic of Yugoslavia) Nikola Pilić	N/A	Round robin (United States) Butch Buchholz (Australia) Tony Roche (United Kingdom) Roger Taylor (France) Pierre Barthès (South Africa) Cliff Drysdale (Australia) John Newcombe
27 Feb	1968 Tulsa WCT; Tulsa, United States	(South Africa) Cliff Drysdale; 31-24	(United States) Dennis Ralston	N/A	Round robin (United States) Butch Buchholz (Australia) Tony Roche (United Kingdom) Roger Taylor (France) Pierre Barthès (Socialist Federal Republic of Yugoslavia) Nikola Pilić (Australia) John Newcombe

=== March ===
Week	Tournament	Champions	Runners-up	Semifinalists	Quarterfinalists
22 Mar	1968 San Diego WCT; San Diego, United States	(United States) Butch Buchholz; 31–21, 31–15	(United States) Dennis Ralston	3rd place (Australia) John Newcombe 4th place (United Kingdom) Roger Taylor	(Australia) Tony Roche (United Kingdom) Mike Davies (France) Pierre Barthès (Socialist Federal Republic of Yugoslavia) Nikola Pilić
28 Mar	1968 WCT Los Altos Hills Pro; Los Altos Hills, United States	(Socialist Federal Republic of Yugoslavia) Nikola Pilić; 31–26, 31–30	(United States) Dennis Ralston	3rd place (Australia) Tony Roche 4th place (France) Pierre Barthès	(United States) Butch Buchholz (South Africa) Cliff Drysdale (Australia) John Newcombe (United Kingdom) Roger Taylor

=== April ===
Week	Tournament	Champions	Runners-up	Semifinalists	Quarterfinalists
1 Apr	1968 WCT Bakersfield Pro; Bakersfield, United States	(Australia) John Newcombe; 31–12, 31–22	(South Africa) Cliff Drysdale	3rd place (United States) Butch Buchholz 4th place (France) Pierre Barthès	(Socialist Federal Republic of Yugoslavia) Nikola Pilić (United States) Dennis Ralston (United Kingdom) Roger Taylor (Australia) Tony Roche
5 Apr	1968 Fresno Pro WCT; Fresno, United States	(United States) Butch Buchholz; 31–23, 31–29	(Australia) Tony Roche	3rd place (South Africa) Cliff Drysdale 4th place (United Kingdom) Roger Taylor	(Socialist Federal Republic of Yugoslavia) Nikola Pilić (France) Pierre Barthès (Australia) John Newcombe (United States) Dennis Ralston
20 Apr	1968 WCT Evansville Pro Classic; Evansville, United States	(Australia) John Newcombe; 31–17, 31–17	(Socialist Federal Republic of Yugoslavia) Nikola Pilić	3rd place (United States) Dennis Ralston 4th place (France) Pierre Barthès	(Australia) Tony Roche (United States) Butch Buchholz (South Africa) Cliff Drysdale (United Kingdom) Roger Taylor

=== May ===
Week	Tournament	Champions	Runners-up	Semifinalists	Quarterfinalists
4 May	1968 WCT Twin Cities Pro; Minneapolis, United States	(United States) Dennis Ralston; 31–26, 19–31, 5–4	(Australia) John Newcombe	3rd place (United States) Butch Buchholz 4th place (Socialist Federal Republic of Yugoslavia) Nikola Pilić	(Australia) Tony Roche (United Kingdom) Roger Taylor (South Africa) Cliff Drysdale (France) Pierre Barthès
10 May	1968 Buffalo Pro WCT; Buffalo, United States	(United States) Butch Buchholz; 31–26, 31–22	(United States) Dennis Ralston	3rd place (France) Pierre Barthès 4th place (South Africa) Cliff Drysdale	(Australia) Tony Roche (Australia) John Newcombe (Socialist Federal Republic of Yugoslavia) Nikola Pilić (United Kingdom) Roger Taylor
31 May	1968 Baltimore Pro WCT; Baltimore, United States	(United States) Dennis Ralston; 6–0, 6–4	(Australia) Tony Roche	3rd place (United Kingdom) Roger Taylor 4th place (South Africa) Cliff Drysdale	(France) Pierre Barthès (United States) Butch Buchholz (Socialist Federal Republic of Yugoslavia) Nikola Pilić (Australia) John Newcombe

=== July ===
Week	Tournament	Champions	Runners-up	Semifinalists	Quarterfinalists
26 Jul	1968 WCT Båstad Pro; Båstad, Sweden	(United States) Dennis Ralston; 6–3, 7–5, 6–1	(Socialist Federal Republic of Yugoslavia) Nikola Pilić	Round robin (United Kingdom) Roger Taylor (Australia) John Newcombe	N/A

=== August ===
Week	Tournament	Champions	Runners-up	Semifinalists	Quarterfinalists
1 Aug	1968 WCT Cannes Pro; Cannes, France	(Australia) John Newcombe; 7–5, 6–2	(United States) Marty Riessen	3rd place (Australia) Mal Anderson 4th place (United Kingdom) Roger Taylor	(Socialist Federal Republic of Yugoslavia) Nikola Pilić (South Africa) Cliff Drysdale (France) Pierre Barthès (Australia) Tony Roche
12 Aug	1968 WCT Newport Casino; Newport, United States	(United States) Marty Riessen; 21–10, 9–21, 21–19,	(South Africa) Cliff Drysdale	3rd place (Australia) John Newcombe 4th place (Socialist Federal Republic of Yugoslavia) Nikola Pilić	Round robin (France) Pierre Barthès (United States) Butch Buchholz (United Kingdom) Roger Taylor (United States) Barry MacKay (tennis)

=== September ===
Week	Tournament	Champions	Runners-up	Semifinalists	Quarterfinalists
26 Sep	1968 Transvaal WCT; Pretoria, South Africa	(Australia) John Newcombe; 11–9, 4–6, 6–3	(Australia) Tony Roche	3rd place (United States) Butch Buchholz 4th place (United States) Marty Riessen	(Socialist Federal Republic of Yugoslavia) Nikola Pilić (South Africa) Raymond Moore (South Africa) Cliff Drysdale (United Kingdom) Roger Taylor
26 Sep	1968 Transvaal WCT; Pretoria, South Africa	(United States) Butch Buchholz (United States) Marty Riessen	(Australia) Tony Roche (Australia) John Newcombe	3rd place (United States) Butch Buchholz 4th place (United States) Marty Riessen	(Socialist Federal Republic of Yugoslavia) Nikola Pilić (South Africa) Raymond Moore (South Africa) Cliff Drysdale (United Kingdom) Roger Taylor

=== October ===
Week	Tournament	Champions	Runners-up	Semifinalists	Quarterfinalists
2 Oct	1968 Johannesburg WCT; Johannesburg, South Africa	(Australia) Tony Roche; 6–2, 9–7	(United States) Butch Buchholz	3rd place (Australia) John Newcombe 4th place (South Africa) Cliff Drysdale	(United States) Marty Riessen (France) Pierre Barthès (United Kingdom) Roger Taylor (Socialist Federal Republic of Yugoslavia) Nikola Pilić
2 Oct	1968 Johannesburg WCT; Johannesburg, South Africa	(South Africa) Cliff Drysdale (United Kingdom) Roger Taylor	(France) Pierre Barthès (South Africa) Raymond Moore	3rd place (Australia) John Newcombe 4th place (South Africa) Cliff Drysdale	(United States) Marty Riessen (France) Pierre Barthès (United Kingdom) Roger Taylor (Socialist Federal Republic of Yugoslavia) Nikola Pilić
6 Oct	1968 Natal Pro WCT; Durban, South Africa	(Australia) John Newcombe; 6–3, 6–4	(Australia) Tony Roche	3rd place (South Africa) Raymond Moore 4th (United States) Marty Riessen	(France) Pierre Barthès (United States) Butch Buchholz (South Africa) Cliff Drysdale (Socialist Federal Republic of Yugoslavia) Nikola Pilić
6 Oct	1968 Natal Pro WCT; Durban, South Africa	(South Africa) Cliff Drysdale (United Kingdom) Roger Taylor	(Australia) Tony Roche (Australia) John Newcombe	3rd place (South Africa) Raymond Moore 4th (United States) Marty Riessen	(France) Pierre Barthès (United States) Butch Buchholz (South Africa) Cliff Drysdale (Socialist Federal Republic of Yugoslavia) Nikola Pilić
9 Oct	1968 WCT Border Pro; East London, South Africa	(Australia) John Newcombe; 10–6	(South Africa) Cliff Drysdale	(Socialist Federal Republic of Yugoslavia) Nikola Pilić (France) Pierre Barthès	(South Africa) Raymond Moore (United States) Marty Riessen (Australia) Tony Roche (United Kingdom) Roger Taylor
10 Oct	1968 WCT Eastern Province Pro; Port Elizabeth, South Africa	(United Kingdom) Roger Taylor; 10–8	(Australia) Tony Roche	(Australia) John Newcombe (Socialist Federal Republic of Yugoslavia) Nikola Pilić	(South Africa) Cliff Drysdale (France) Pierre Barthès (United States) Butch Buchholz (South Africa) Raymond Moore
11 Oct	1968 WCT Western Province Pro; Cape Town, South Africa	(Australia) Tony Roche; 6–2, 6–1	(South Africa) Cliff Drysdale	(United States) Butch Buchholz (France) Pierre Barthès	(South Africa) Raymond Moore (United States) Marty Riessen (Australia) John Newcombe (Socialist Federal Republic of Yugoslavia) Nikola Pilić
11 Oct	1968 WCT Western Province Pro; Cape Town, South Africa	(Australia) Tony Roche (Australia) John Newcombe (South Africa) Cliff Drysdale (United Kingdom) Roger Taylor divided title		(United States) Butch Buchholz (France) Pierre Barthès	(South Africa) Raymond Moore (United States) Marty Riessen (Australia) John Newcombe (Socialist Federal Republic of Yugoslavia) Nikola Pilić
16 Oct	WCT Kimberley Pro; Kimberley, South Africa	(Australia) John Newcombe; 10–6	(Australia) Tony Roche	(France) Pierre Barthès (United States) Marty Riessen	(United Kingdom) Roger Taylor (United States) Butch Buchholz (South Africa) Cliff Drysdale (Socialist Federal Republic of Yugoslavia) Nikola Pilić

=== November ===
Week	Tournament	Champions	Runners-up	Semifinalists	Quarterfinalists
7 Nov	1968 Vienna Pro WCT; Vienna, Austria	(Australia) Tony Roche; 6–4, 7–5	(Australia) John Newcombe	3rd place (United Kingdom) Roger Taylor 4th place (Socialist Federal Republic of Yugoslavia) Nikola Pilić	

== See also ==
- 1968 Men's National Tennis League
