= Hollywood Pro Challenge Cup =

Defunct tennis tournament
- Tour: Pro Tennis Tour; National Tennis League
- Founded: 1966; 60 years ago
- Abolished: 1969; 57 years ago
- Location: Hollywood, Florida, United States
- Venue: David Park
- Surface: Clay / outdoor

The Hollywood Pro Challenge Cup was a men's professional tennis tournament first held in 1966. Later also known as the Hollywood Pro Championships. The tournament was part of Pro Tennis Tour from inception, and also the inaugural 1968 Men's National Tennis League. It was played at David Park, Hollywood, Florida, United States until 1968.

== History ==
The Hollywood Pro Challenge Cup was first held in December 1966 in Hollywood, Florida, United States. The inaugural winner of this Pancho Gonzales who defeated Rod Laver. The tournament was not held on a permanent basis and was staged again until 1968. On 6 March 1968 the National Tennis League announced a new men's tennis tour offering prize money worth US$400,000. The NTL Hollywood Pro Challenge Cup was part of that tour for that season, under the sponsorship name the Burger King Challenge Cup.

== Finals ==
Year	Location	Winners	Runners-up	Score
1966	Hollywood	(United States) Pancho Gonzales	(Australia) Rod Laver	6–4, 6–2.
1967	Hollywood	(United States) Pancho Gonzales	(Australia) Rod Laver	6–4, 6–2.
1968	Hollywood	(Australia) Tony Roche	(Australia) Rod Laver	6–3, 9–7, 6–4.

== Event names ==
- Hollywood Pro Challenge Cup (1966)
- NTL Hollywood Pro Challenge Cup (tour name) (1968)
- Burger King Challenge Cup (sponsorship name) (1968)
- Hollywood Pro Championships (1969)
