= São Paulo Pro Championships =

Defunct tennis tournament
- Tour: National Tennis League
- Founded: 1968; 57 years ago
- Abolished: 1968; 57 years ago
- Location: São Paulo, Brazil
- Surface: Clay / indoor

The São Paulo Pro Championships also known as the NTL São Paulo Pro Championships was a men's professional tennis tournament held only one time in 1968. The tournament was part of inaugural National Tennis League and played in São Paulo, Brazil.

== History ==
On 6 March 1968 the National Tennis League announced a new men's tennis tour offering prize money worth US$400,000. The São Paulo Pro Championships were staged for two editions only the first from 23 to 25 March 1968, and the second using a round robin format from 4 November to 6 November 1968. The championships were played in São Paulo, Brazil.

== Finals ==
=== (Spring) ===
Year	Champions	Runners-up	Score
1968	(Australia) Rod Laver	(United States) Pancho Gonzales	def.

=== (Autumn) ===
Round Robin Event

Standings	Player	Matches
First	(Australia) Rod Laver	3–0.
Second	(Australia) Roy Emerson	1–2.
Second	(Spain) Andrés Gimeno	1–2.
Second	(Australia) Fred Stolle	1–2.

== Event names ==
- NTL São Paulo Pro Championships (March 1968)
- NTL São Paulo Round Robin Pro Championships (November 1968)
