= NTL Wembley Invitation =

Defunct tennis tournament
- Tour: NTL Pro Tour
- Founded: 1968; 57 years ago
- Abolished: 1968; 57 years ago
- Location: London, England
- Venue: Empire Pool
- Surface: Wood / indoor
- Prize money: £8000 (combined)

The NTL Wembley Invitation was a men's and women's professional tennis tournament held only one time in 1968. Also called the Wembley International Invitation. It was played on indoor courts at the Empire Pool, London, England from May 3 to May 7.

== History ==
The NTL Wembley Invitation was an National Tennis League tennis tournament that was part of the 1968 NTL Pro Tour for one season only. The tournament included a men's singles event, a women's singles, two doubles events and a mixed doubles for a combined £8000 prize fund, or £139,462 inflation adjusted to 2024.

The entrants for then men's competition included; Andrés Gimeno, Roy Emerson, Rod Laver, Pancho Gonzales, Ken Rosewall and Fred Stolle. The women's competition featured Rosie Casals, Francoise Durr, Ann Haydon Jones and Billie Jean King. It was played on indoor courts at the Empire Pool, London, England.

== Finals ==
=== Men's singles ===
Year	Champions	Runners-up	Score
1968	(Australia) Rod Laver	(Australia) Ken Rosewall	6–0, 6–1, 6–0.

=== Men's doubles ===
Year	Champions	Runners-up	Score
1968	(Australia) Roy Emerson (Australia) Rod Laver	(Spain) Andrés Gimeno (United States) Pancho Gonzales	12–10, 6–4

=== Women's singles ===
Year	Champions	Runners-up	Score
1968	(United States) Billie Jean King	(United Kingdom) Ann Haydon Jones	4–6, 9–7, 7–5

=== Women's doubles ===
Year	Champions	Runners-up	Score
1968	(United States) Rosie Casals (United States) Billie Jean King	(France) Francoise Durr (United Kingdom) Ann Haydon Jones	7–5, 6–3

== See also ==
- 1968 Men's National Tennis League
