= Baltimore Professional Championships =

Defunct tennis tournament
- Tour: WCT Circuit (1968); NTL Tour (1969)
- Founded: 1968; 57 years ago
- Abolished: 1969; 56 years ago
- Location: Baltimore (1968, 1969)
- Venue: Baltimore Civic Center
- Surface: Carpet / indoor

The Baltimore Professional Championships also known as the NTL Baltimore Pro Championships was a men's international professional indoor tennis tournament founded in 1968. It was first played at the Baltimore Civic Center in Baltimore, Maryland, United States. It was held until 1969 when it was discontinued.

== History ==
The Baltimore Pro Championships was a men's tennis tournament established in 1968 as the Baltimore Pro Tennis Classic, a $6000 event that was part of the 1968 WCT Circuit that year. Its tour name was the WCT Baltimore Pro Championships. It was the successor tournament to the earlier College Park Pro Championships that was an indoor event held at the University of Maryland, College Park in 1964. It was first played on indoor carpet courts at the Baltimore Civic Center in Baltimore, Maryland, United States. In 1969 the tournament was part the NTL Pro Tour that year and was branded as the NTL Baltimore Pro Championships after which the event was discontinued.

== Finals ==
=== Men's singles ===
(Incomplete roll)

| Year | Champions | Runners-up | Score |
|---|---|---|---|
| 1968 | (United States) Dennis Ralston | (Australia) Tony Roche | 6–0, 6–4. |
| 1969 | (Australia) Rod Laver | (United States) Pancho Gonzales | 6–3, 3–6, 7–5, 4–6, 8–6. |

== Tour names ==
- WCT Baltimore Pro Championships (1968)
- NTL Baltimore Pro Championships (1969)
