= Buenos Aires Pro Championships =

Defunct tennis tournament
- Tour: National Tennis League
- Founded: 1968; 57 years ago
- Abolished: 1968; 57 years ago
- Location: Buenos Aires, Argentina
- Surface: Clay / outdoor

The Buenos Aires Pro Championships and officially known as the NTL Buenos Aires Pro Championships was a men's professional clay court tennis tournament held only one time in 1968. The tournament was part of inaugural National Tennis League and played Buenos Aires, Argentina.

== History ==
On 6 March 1968 the National Tennis League announced a new men's tennis tour offering prize money worth US$400,000. NTL Buenos Aires Championships were staged for one edition only from 23 to 25 March 1968. The championships were played in Buenos Aires, Argentina. The winner of the tournament was Australian player Rod Laver who defeated American player Pancho Gonzales in three sets.

== Finals ==
=== Singles ===
Year	Champions	Runners-up	Score
1968	(Australia) Rod Laver	(United States) Pancho Gonzales	7-5, 5–7, 6–4.
