= 1969 Philadelphia International Indoor Open Championships – Singles =

Singles
- 1969 Philadelphia International Indoor Open Championships

Final
- Champion: (Australia) Rod Laver
- Runner-up: (Australia) Tony Roche
- Score: 7–5, 6–4, 6–4

Details
- Draw: 32
- Seeds: 8

Events
Singles	Doubles
- U.S. Pro Indoor

Manuel Santana was the defending champion, but did not participate this year.

Rod Laver won the title, defeating Tony Roche 7–5, 6–4, 6–4 in the final.

== Seeds ==
1. (Australia) Rod Laver (champion)
2. (United States) Arthur Ashe (first round)
3. (Australia) Tony Roche (final)
4. (Australia) Ken Rosewall (semifinals)
5. (Australia) John Newcombe (second round)
6. (Netherlands) Tom Okker (semifinals)
7. (United States) Pancho Gonzales (quarterfinals)
8. (Australia) Roy Emerson (first round)

== Draw ==
Key

- Q = Qualifier
- WC = Wild card
- LL = Lucky loser
- Alt = Alternate
- ITF = ITF entry
- PR = Protected ranking
- SR = Special ranking
- SE = Special exempt
- JE = Junior exempt
- JR = Junior Accelerator Programme entrant
- CO = College Accelerator Programme entrant
- NG = Next Gen Accelerator Program entrant
- w/o = Walkover
- r = Retired
- d = Defaulted

=== Finals ===
Semifinals
1	(Australia) Rod Laver	6	6
4	(Australia) Ken Rosewall	4	2
3	(Australia) Tony Roche	6	6
6	(Netherlands) Tom Okker	1	4

Final
1	(Australia) Rod Laver	7	6	6
3	(Australia) Tony Roche	5	4	4

=== Top half ===
First round
1	(Australia) R Laver	6	6
(France) P Barthès	3	1
(United States) H Fitzgibbon	4	12
(United States) EB Buchholz	6	14
(Socialist Federal Republic of Yugoslavia) N Pilić	6	3	6
(Socialist Federal Republic of Yugoslavia) Ž Franulović	4	6	4
(United States) C Pasarell	6	6
8	(Australia) R Emerson	3	2
5	(Australia) J Newcombe	6	5	6
(United Kingdom) Peter Curtis	2	7	2
(United States) J McManus	6	3	0
(Spain) A Gimeno	4	6	6
(United States) D Ralston	4	5
(South Africa) R Moore	6	7
(Romania) I Năstase	1	4
4	(Australia) K Rosewall	6	6

Second round
1	(Australia) R Laver	6	7
(United States) EB Buchholz	1	5
(Socialist Federal Republic of Yugoslavia) N Pilić	2	3
(United States) C Pasarell	6	6
5	(Australia) J Newcombe	5	3
(Spain) A Gimeno	7	6
(South Africa) R Moore	4	1
4	(Australia) K Rosewall	6	6

Quarterfinals
1	(Australia) R Laver	6	6
(United States) C Pasarell	1	3
(Spain) A Gimeno	3	5
4	(Australia) K Rosewall	6	7

Semifinals
1	(Australia) R Laver	6	6
4	(Australia) K Rosewall	4	2

=== Bottom half ===
First round
3	(Australia) T Roche	6	6
(United States) P Segura	4	2
(Australia) K Fletcher	2	2
(United States) M Riessen	6	6
(Brazil) T Koch	7	3	9
(United States) R Holmberg	5	6	7
(Denmark) T Ulrich	3	6	2
7	(United States) RP Gonzales	6	3	6
6	(Netherlands) T Okker	6	6
(Sweden) ON Bengtson	3	3
(United Kingdom) R Taylor	6	6
(United States) R Lutz	3	3
(United States) S Smith	6	6
(Jamaica) R Russell	4	3
(Czechoslovakia) J Kodeš	6	4	6
2	(United States) A Ashe	4	6	2

Second round
3	(Australia) T Roche	9	6
(United States) M Riessen	8	2
(Brazil) T Koch	3	5
7	(United States) RP Gonzales	6	7
6	(Netherlands) T Okker	4	6	13
(United Kingdom) R Taylor	6	3	11
(United States) S Smith	2	6	2
(Czechoslovakia) J Kodeš	6	2	6

Quarterfinals
3	(Australia) T Roche	6	6
7	(United States) RP Gonzales	3	3
6	(Netherlands) T Okker	6	6
(Czechoslovakia) J Kodeš	3	1

Semifinals
3	(Australia) T Roche	6	6
6	(Netherlands) T Okker	1	4
