= NTL Bogotá Pro Championships =

Defunct tennis tournament
- Tour: NTL Pro Tour
- Founded: 1968; 57 years ago
- Abolished: 1968; 57 years ago
- Location: Bogotá, Colombia
- Surface: Clay / indoor

The NTL Bogotá Pro Championships was a men's professional tennis tournament staged only one time in 1968. The tournament was part of NTL Pro Tour, and was played in Bogotá, Colombia.

== History ==
On 6 March 1968 the National Tennis League announced a new men's tennis tour offering prize money worth US$400,000. The NTL Bogotá Pro Championships was third leg of NTL Pro Tour for one season only. The event was son by Spanish player Andrés Gimeno who defeated Australian player Fred Stolle.

== Finals ==
Year	Location	Champions	Runners-up	Score
1968	Bogota	(Spain) Andrés Gimeno	(Australia) Fred Stolle	11–13, 6–3, 6–4.
