= Midland RC International =

Defunct tennis tournament
- Tour: ILTF (1964-66); Pro Tennis Tour (1967); NTL Pro Tour (1968); WCT Circuit (1969–70); Independent (1971–72)
- Founded: 1964; 62 years ago
- Abolished: 1972; 54 years ago
- Location: Midland, Texas, United States
- Venue: Midland Racquet Club
- Surface: Hard / outdoor

The Midland RC International was a men's and women's professional tennis tournament first founded in 1964 as the Midland Racquet Club National Invitational. It was first played on outdoor hard courts at the Midland Racquet Club, Midland, Texas, United States. The event ran for five editions and was usually staged late September to mid October annually until 1972.

== History ==
The Midland RC International was a men's and women's professional tennis tournament founded in 1964 as the Midland Racquet Club National Invitational. It was played at the Midland Racquet Club, Midland, Texas, United States. The inaugural edition of the event was part of the National Tennis League and was branded as the NTL Midland Championships. In 1969 the event became part of the WCT Circuit and was branded as the WCT Midland Pro Championships. In 1970 the tournament was rebranded as the Midland (Texas) Pro Invitational, and still part of the WCT Circuit. In 1971 the event was dropped from the WCT tour and became part of the ILTF Independent Circuit for that year. In 1972 the tournament was reinstated as a WCT event and branded as the Midland RC International.

== Finals ==
=== Men's singles ===
(incomplete roll)

| Year | Champions | Runners-up | Score |
|---|---|---|---|
| 1964 | (United States) Chuck McKinley | (United States) Dennis Ralston | 6–4, 7–5. |
| 1965 | (United States) Marty Riessen | (Mexico) Antonio Palafox | 6–3, 6–2. |
| 1968 | (United States) Pancho Gonzales | (Australia) Roy Emerson | 7–5, 6–3. |
| 1969 | (Australia) Ken Rosewall | (United States) Pancho Gonzales | 5–7, 6–1, 7–5. |
| 1970 | (United Kingdom) Roger Taylor | (Australia) John Newcombe | 2–6, 7–6, 6–1. |
| 1971 | (Socialist Federal Republic of Yugoslavia) Nikola Pilić | (United Kingdom) Mark Cox | 7–6, 7–6, 6–3. |
| 1972 | (New Zealand) Brian Fairlie | (Pakistan) Haroon Rahim | 7–5, 6–3, 7–6. |

=== Men's doubles ===
(incomplete roll)

| Year | Champions | Runners-up | Score |
|---|---|---|---|
| 1964 | (United States) Chuck McKinley (United States) Dennis Ralston | (Mexico) Rafael Osuna (Mexico) Antonio Palafox | 11–9, 6-3 |
| 1965 | (United States) Clark Graebner (United States) Marty Riessen | (United States) Chuck McKinley (United States) Dennis Ralston | 6–2, 6-2 |

=== Women's singles ===
(incomplete roll)

| Year | Champions | Runners-up | Score |
|---|---|---|---|
| 1964 | (United States) Nancy Richey | (United States) Karen Susman | 6–3, 6–4 |
| 1969 | (United States) Billie Jean King | (United States) Rosie Casals | 6–4, 5–7, 6–0 |

=== Mixed doubles ===
(incomplete roll)

| Year | Champions | Runners-up | Score |
|---|---|---|---|
| 1964 | (United States) Ham Richardson (United States) Billie Jean Moffitt King | (France) Pierre Darmon (France) Rosie Darmon | 9–7, 6-3 |

== Event names ==
- Midland Racquet Club National Invitational (1964-1966)
- Midland Invitational Pro Championships (1967)
- NTL Midland Championships (1968)
- WCT Midland Pro Championships (1969) men
- Midland Racquet Club Invitational (1969) women
- Midland (Texas) Pro Invitational (1970, 1971)
- Midland RC International (1972)

== Sources ==
- ATP Tour: Tournaments: Midland: overview
