= Madison Square Garden Pro =

Defunct tennis tournament
- Founded: 1954
- Abolished: 1969
- Editions: 5
- Location: New York City; United States
- Venue: Madison Square Garden
- Surface: Hard court (indoors)

The Madison Square Garden Pro was a men's tennis event for professionals. Also known as the Madison Square Garden Pro Championships. In 1954 it was the opening four-man tournament of the 1954 World Pro Tour. In 1966 and 1967 a tournament was held at Madison Square Garden on the pro circuit. The 1968 and 1969 tournaments contained players from the WCT and NTL tours (four players from each tour). From 1977 to 1989 the Masters Grand Prix finals were played at Madison Square Garden. A separate women's event was held in 1968.

== Men's singles ==
Year	Date	Champion	Runner-up	Score
1954	Jan 3–4	(United States) Pancho Gonzales	(Ecuador) Pancho Segura	7–9, 6–4, 6–4
1966	Mar 21–26	(Australia) Ken Rosewall	(Australia) Rod Laver	6–3, 6–3
1967	Jun 6–9	(Australia) Rod Laver	(Australia) Ken Rosewall	6–4, 6–4
1968	Nov 27– Dec 1	(Australia) Tony Roche	(United States) Pancho Gonzales	6–3, 6–4
1969	May 15–17	(Australia) Rod Laver	(Australia) Roy Emerson	6–2, 4–6, 6–1

== Women's singles ==
Year	Date	Champion	Runner-up	Score
1968	May 18–19	(United Kingdom) Anne Haydon Jones	(United States) Billie Jean King	6–4, 6–4

== See also ==
- Madison Square Garden Open Tennis Championship (USLTA event played at same venue from 1968 to 1970)
- Major professional tennis tournaments before the Open Era
- Tennis Pro Tours
