= BBC2 World Pro Invitation Championships =

Defunct tennis tournament
- Tour: NTL Pro Tour
- Founded: 1968; 57 years ago
- Abolished: 1968; 57 years ago
- Location: London, England
- Venue: Empire Pool
- Surface: Carpet / indoor

The BBC2 World Pro Invitation Championships was a professional tennis tournament staged only one time in 1968. The tournament was played at the Empire Pool, Wembley, London, England and was part of NTL Pro Tour that year.

== History ==
On 6 March 1968 the National Tennis League announced a new men's tennis tour offering prize money worth US$400,000. The BBC2 World Pro Invitation Championships was fifth leg of NTL Pro Tour and was held on 18 April 1968. It featured four players including Roy Emerson, Pancho Gonzales, Rod Laver and Ken Rosewall. The event was won by Rod Laver who defeated Ken Rosewall in the final in straight sets.

== Finals ==
| Year | Location | Champions | Runners-up | Score |
|---|---|---|---|---|
| 1968 | Wembley | (Australia) Rod Laver | (Australia) Ken Rosewall | 6–3, 10–8. |
