= La Paz Round Robin Championships =

Defunct tennis tournament
- Tour: ILTF World Circuit (1966); NTL Pro Tour (1968)
- Founded: 1966; 59 years ago
- Abolished: 1968; 57 years ago
- Location: La Paz, Bolivia
- Surface: Clay / outdoor

The La Paz Round Robin Championships and later known as the NTL La Paz Pro Round Robin was a men's tennis tournament founded in November 1966. It was held for two editions only and was played on outdoor clay courts in La Paz, Bolivia. In 1969 it was not renewed as a National Tennis League event and was discontinued.

== History ==
The inaugural La Paz Pro Championships was a men's tennis tournament first held from November 6 to 8 1966, and was played on outdoor clay courts in La Paz, Bolivia. The 1968 edition was played from November 1 to 3, and was part of the National Tennis League that year. The event functioned as round robin tournament. In 1969 it was not renewed as a National Tennis League event and was discontinued.

== Results ==
=== 1966 ===
Players	(Chile) Bravo	(Spain) Arilla	(Sweden) Ölander	(Italy) Pietrangeli
(Chile) Jaime Pinto Bravo		6–3, 5–7, 6–8	6–4, 7–5	6–2, 4–6, 3–6
(Spain) José Luis Arilla	3–6, 7–5, 8–6		4–6, 3–6	2–6, 3–6
(Sweden) Lars Ölander	6–4, 7–5	6–4, 6–3		6–3, 1–6, 6–3
(Italy) Nicola Pietrangeli	2–6, 6–4, 6–3	6–2, 6–3	3-6, 6–1, 3-6

Standings
Position	Name	RR W/L
1st	(Sweden) Lars Ölander	3–0
2nd	(Chile) Jaime Pinto Bravo	2–1
=	(Italy) Nicola Pietrangeli	2–1
4th	(Spain) José Luis Arilla	1–2

=== 1968 ===
Players	(Australia) Emerson	(Spain) Gimeno	(Australia) Laver	(Australia) Stolle
(Australia) Roy Emerson		1–6, 6–4, 4–6	4–6, 2–6	6–2, 6–4
(Spain) Andrés Gimeno	6–1, 4–6, 6–4		2–6, 6–2, 2–6	3–6, 6–2, 4–6
(Australia) Rod Laver	6–4, 6–2	6–4, 3–6, 7–5		6–3, 5–7, 9–7
(Australia) Fred Stolle	3–6, 6–2, 4–6	6–1, 5–6, 6–1	3–6, 7–5, 7–9

Standings
Position	Name	RR W/L
1st	(Australia) Rod Laver	3–0
2nd	(Australia) Roy Emerson	2–1
=	(Spain) Andrés Gimeno	2–1
=	(Australia) Fred Stolle	2–1
