= College Park Pro Championships =

Defunct tennis tournament
- Tour: Pro Tennis Tour
- Founded: 1964; 61 years ago
- Abolished: 1964; 61 years ago
- Location: College Park, Maryland, United States
- Venue: College Park Tennis Center
- Surface: Wood / indoor

The College Park Pro Championships was a men's international professional indoor tennis tournament founded in 1964. It was first played at the College Park Tennis Center in College Park, Maryland, United States. It was held one time when it was discontinued.

== History ==
The Baltimore Pro Championships was a men's tennis tournament established in 1964. It was an indoor tennis event played at the College Park Tennis Center, University of Maryland, College Park, Maryland, United States. It was the precursor tournament to the later Baltimore Professional Championships also an indoor event held Baltimore in 1968.

The tournament featured a draw of ten that included the following players; Alex Olmedo, Andrés Gimeno, Barry MacKay (tennis), Butch Buchholz, Frank Sedgman, Ken Rosewall, Lew Hoad, Mike Davies, Pancho Gonzales and Rod Laver competing in an elimination round format. It was played from May 19 to May 24, 1964. The tournament was discontinued.

== Final ==
=== Singles ===
(Incomplete roll)

Year	Champions	Runners-up	Score
1964	(Spain) Andrés Gimeno	(Australia) Lew Hoad	4–6, 6–2, 10–8.
