= NTL Lima Pro Championships =

Defunct tennis tournament
- Tour: NTL Pro Tour (1968)
- Founded: 1968; 57 years ago
- Abolished: 1968; 57 years ago
- Location: Lima, Peru
- Surface: Clay / outdoor

The NTL Lima Pro Championships also known NTL Lima Round Robin was a men's and women's tennis tournament founded in November 1968. It was held for one edition only and was played on outdoor clay courts in Lima, Peru. In 1969 it was not renewed as a National Tennis League event and was discontinued.

== History ==
The inaugural Lima Pro Championships was a men's and women's tennis tournament first held from November 1 to 3 1968, and was played on outdoor clay courts in La Paz, Bolivia. The 1968 edition was part of the National Tennis League that year and branded as the NTL Lima Round Robin, or NTL Lima Pro Championships. The event functioned as round robin tournament. In 1969 it was not renewed as a National Tennis League event and was discontinued.

== Results ==
=== Men's RR ===
Players	(Australia) Emerson	(Spain) Gimeno	(Australia) Laver	(Australia) Stolle
(Australia) Roy Emerson		1–6, 4–6	8–6, 6–4	4–6, 3–6
(Spain) Andrés Gimeno	6–1, 6–4		6–1, 6–2	6–2, 2–6, 3–6
(Australia) Rod Laver	6–8, 4–6	1–6, 2–6		6–4, 3–6, 2–6
(Australia) Fred Stolle	6–4, 6–3	2–6, 6–2, 6–3	4–6, 6–2, 6–2

Standings
Position	Name	RR W/L
1st	(Australia) Fred Stolle	3–0
2nd	(Spain) Andrés Gimeno	2–1
3rd	(Australia) Roy Emerson	1–2
4th	(Australia) Rod Laver	0–3
