= South Texas Pro Championships =

Defunct tennis tournament
- Tour: NTL Pro Tour (1968); WCT Circuit (1970)
- Founded: 1968; 58 years ago
- Abolished: 1970; 56 years ago
- Location: Corpus Christi, Texas, United States
- Venue: HEB Tennis Center
- Surface: Hard / outdoor

The South Texas Pro Championships or officially the South Texas Professional Championships was a men's and women's professional tennis tournament founded in 1968. It was first played on outdoor hard courts at the HEB Tennis Center, Corpus Christi, Texas, United States. The event ran for TWO editions and was usually staged in October, before moving to February annually until 1970.

== History ==
The South Texas Pro Championships was a men's and women's professional tennis tournament founded in 1968. It was played at the HEB Tennis Center, Corpus Christi, Texas, United States. The inaugural edition of the event was part of the National Tennis League and was branded as the NTL South Texas Championships. The event was not held in 1969. In 1970 the event became part of the WCT Circuit and was branded as the WCT South Texas Professional Championships (Corpus Christi). The 1968 edition was held in October that year, and in 1970 its scheduling was changed to February that year.

== Finals ==
=== Men's singles ===
(incomplete roll)

Year	Champions	Runners-up	Score
1968	(Australia) Rod Laver	(Spain) Andrés Gimeno	6–2, 6–4.
1970	(Australia) Ken Rosewall	(Australia) John Newcombe	6–2, 6–0.

== Event tour names ==
- NTL South Texas Pro Championships (1968)
- WCT South Texas Professional Championships (1970)

== Sources ==
- ATP Tour: Tournaments: Corpus Christi: overview
