= Orlando Professional Championships =

Defunct tennis tournament
- Tour: Pro Tennis Tour (1942, 1964-1967); WCT Circuit (1968); ILTF World Circuit (1969)
- Founded: 1942; 83 years ago
- Abolished: 1969; 56 years ago
- Location: Orlando, Florida, United States
- Venue: Orlando Tennis Club; Orlando Sports Stadium
- Surface: Clay / outdoor Carpet / indoor

The Orlando Professional Championships also known WCT Orlando Pro Championships was a men's professional tennis tournament founded in 1942. It was held in Orlando, Florida, United States. In 1968 it was part of the WCT Circuit. In 1969 it became part of National Tennis League then was discontinued.

== History ==
The Orlando Professional Championships was a men's and women's tennis tournament sanctioned by the Professional Lawn Tennis Association, and first held from 24 January to 2 February 1942, and was played on outdoor clay courts of the Orlando Tennis Club in Orlando, Florida, United States. That event was discontinued, but in 1964 the tournament was revived at the same venue. The 1968 edition was part of the WCT Circuit that year and branded as the WCT Orlando Pro Championships, and was held at the Orlando Sports Stadium and played on indoor astroturf courts. In 1969 it was not renewed as a WCT Circuit event and instead became part of the National Tennis League for one season only, when it was branded as the Orlando Invitational Pro Championships. This tournament was succeeded by a new Orlando tennis event in 1974, called the WCT Orlando Classic played at the Vistana Racquet Club.

== Finals ==
=== Men's singles ===
(Incomplete roll)

Year	Champions	Runners-up	Score
1942	(United States) Wayne Sabin	(United States) Keith Gledhill	4–6, 6–3, 8–6, 6–2.
1964	(United States) Pancho Gonzales	(United States) Pancho Segura	6–2, 6–3, 6–3.
1965	(United States) Pancho Gonzales (2)	(United States) Pancho Segura	6–1, 6–1.
1966	(United States) Pancho Gonzales (3)	(Australia) Rod Laver	6–3, 6–0.
1967	(Australia) Rod Laver	(United States) Pancho Gonzales	6–4, 2–6, 6–0.
1968	(United States) Dennis Ralston	(Socialist Federal Republic of Yugoslavia) Niki Pilic	31–28 RR Final.
↓ Open era ↓
1969	(Australia) Rod Laver (2)	(United States) Ken Rosewall	6–3, 6–2.

== Event names ==
- Orlando Professional Championships (1942, 1964–1967)
- WCT Orlando Pro Championships (1968)
- Orlando Invitational Pro Championships (1969)
