= 1969 Philadelphia International Indoor Open Championships – Doubles =

Doubles
- 1969 Philadelphia International Indoor Open Championships

Final
- Champion: (Netherlands) Tom Okker (United States) Marty Riessen
- Runner-up: (Australia) John Newcombe (Australia) Tony Roche
- Score: 8–6, 6–4

Events
Singles	Doubles
- U.S. Pro Indoor

Tom Okker and Marty Riessen won the title, defeating John Newcombe and Tony Roche 8–6, 6–4 in the final.

== Seeds ==
1. (Australia) John Newcombe / (Australia) Tony Roche (final)
2. (United States) Robert Lutz / (United States) Stan Smith (quarterfinals)

== Draw ==
Key

- Q = Qualifier
- WC = Wild card
- LL = Lucky loser
- Alt = Alternate
- ITF = ITF entry
- PR = Protected ranking
- SR = Special ranking
- SE = Special exempt
- JE = Junior exempt
- JR = Junior Accelerator Programme entrant
- CO = College Accelerator Programme entrant
- NG = Next Gen Accelerator Program entrant
- w/o = Walkover
- r = Retired
- d = Defaulted

=== Draw ===
Quarterfinals
1	(Australia) J Newcombe (Australia) T Roche	w/o
(Australia) I Fletcher (Denmark) T Ulrich
(United States) EB Buchholz (United States) D Ralston	8	4
(Australia) R Emerson (Australia) R Laver	10	6
(United States) RP Gonzales (Australia) K Rosewall	w/o
(United States) A Ashe (United States) C Pasarell
(Netherlands) T Okker (United States) M Riessen	10	7
2	(United States) R Lutz (United States) S Smith	8	5

Semifinals
1	(Australia) J Newcombe (Australia) T Roche	13	4	13
(Australia) R Emerson (Australia) R Laver	11	6	11
(United States) RP Gonzales (Australia) K Rosewall	3	4
(Netherlands) T Okker (United States) M Riessen	6	6

Final
1	(Australia) J Newcombe (Australia) T Roche	6	4
(Netherlands) T Okker (United States) M Riessen	8	6
