= 1969 Philadelphia International Indoor Open Championships =

- Date: February 5–9
- Edition: 2nd
- Category: World Championship Tennis
- Prize money: $30,000
- Surface: Carpet / indoor
- Location: Philadelphia, PA, United States
- Venue: Spectrum
- Attendance: 44,538

Champions

Singles
- (Australia) Rod Laver

Doubles
- (Netherlands) Tom Okker / (United States) Marty Riessen
- U.S. Pro Indoor

The 1969 Philadelphia International Indoor Open Championships was a men's WCT tennis tournament played on indoor carpet courts. It was played at the Spectrum in Philadelphia, Pennsylvania in the United States. It was the second edition of the tournament and was held from February 5 through February 9, 1969. Total attendance for the five-day event was 44,538. First-seeded Rod Laver won the singles title.

== Finals ==
=== Singles ===
(Australia) Rod Laver defeated (Australia) Tony Roche 7–5, 6–4, 6–4

- It was Laver's 3rd title of the year and the 6th of his professional career.

=== Doubles ===
(Netherlands) Tom Okker / (United States) Marty Riessen defeated (Australia) John Newcombe / (Australia) Tony Roche 8–6, 6–4

- It was Okker's 1st title of the year and the 4th of his professional career. It was Riessen's 1st title of the year and the 3rd of his professional career.
