= Tony Roche =

Australian tennis player (born 1945)

Tony Roche AO MBE
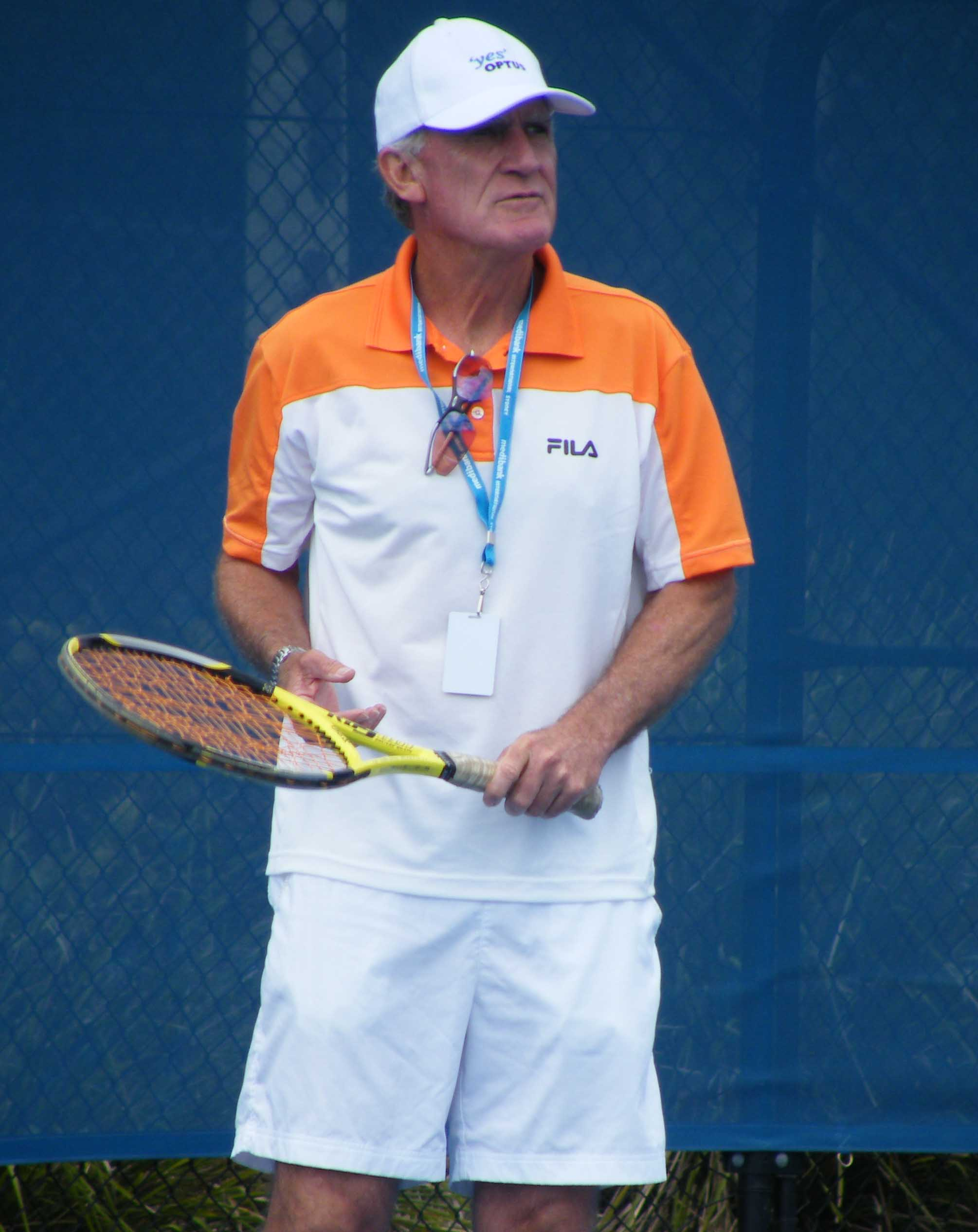
- Full name: Anthony Dalton Roche
- Country (sports): Australia
- Residence: Turramurra, New South Wales, Australia
- Born: 17 May 1945 (age 81) Wagga Wagga, Australia
- Height: 1.77 m (5 ft 10 in)
- Turned pro: 1968 (amateur from 1963)
- Retired: 1979
- Plays: Left-handed (one-handed backhand)
- Prize money: US$ 529,199
- Int. Tennis HoF: 1986 (member page)

Singles
- Career record: 838-338 (71.2%)
- Career titles: 46
- Highest ranking: No. 2 (1969, Lance Tingay)

Grand Slam singles results
- Australian Open: SF (1965, 1967, 1969, 1975)
- French Open: W (1966)
- Wimbledon: F (1968)
- US Open: F (1969, 1970)

Doubles
- Career record: 208–94 (Open era)
- Career titles: 18 (Open era)
- Highest ranking: No. 1 (1965)

Grand Slam doubles results
- Australian Open: W (1965, 1967, 1971, 1976, 1977)
- French Open: W (1967, 1969)
- Wimbledon: W (1965, 1968, 1969, 1970, 1974)
- US Open: W (1967)

Grand Slam mixed doubles results
- Australian Open: W (1966)
- Wimbledon: W (1976)

Team competitions
- Davis Cup: W (1965, 1966, 1967, 1977)

Anthony Dalton Roche AO MBE (born 17 May 1945), professionally known as Tony Roche is an Australian former professional tennis player.

A native of Tarcutta, Roche played junior tennis in the New South Wales regional city of Wagga Wagga. He won one Grand Slam singles title, the 1966 French Open at Roland Garros, and 15 Grand Slam doubles titles (12 of these with John Newcombe).

In 1968, Roche won the WCT/NTL combined professional championship in men's singles in the final event of the season at Madison Square Garden. He was ranked World No. 2 by Lance Tingay of The Daily Telegraph in 1969.

He won the U.S. Pro Championships in 1970 at Longwood in Boston. Roche won the New South Wales Open twice, in 1969 and 1976. He won a key Davis Cup singles match in 1977.

He also coached multi-Grand Slam winning world No. 1s Ivan Lendl, Patrick Rafter, Roger Federer and Lleyton Hewitt.

== Playing career ==
=== Amateur ===
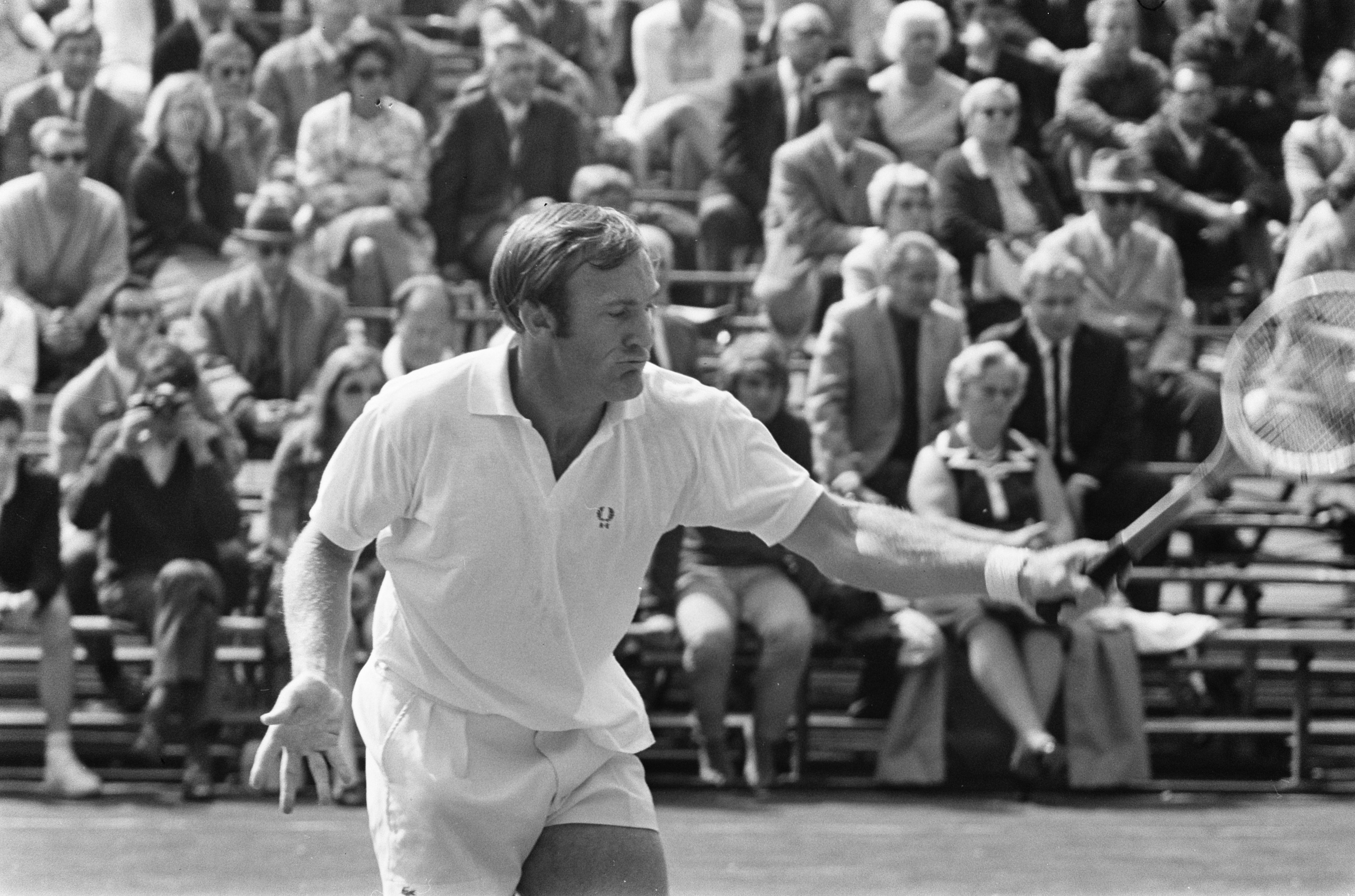
Roche at the Amsterdam tournament in 1969

Roche started to play tennis at school when he was nine. His father, who worked as a butcher, and his mother were both recreational tennis players and encouraged his interest. Roche grew up playing in Australia under the tutelage of Harry Hopman, who also coached other Australian tennis players such as Rod Laver and Ken Rosewall.

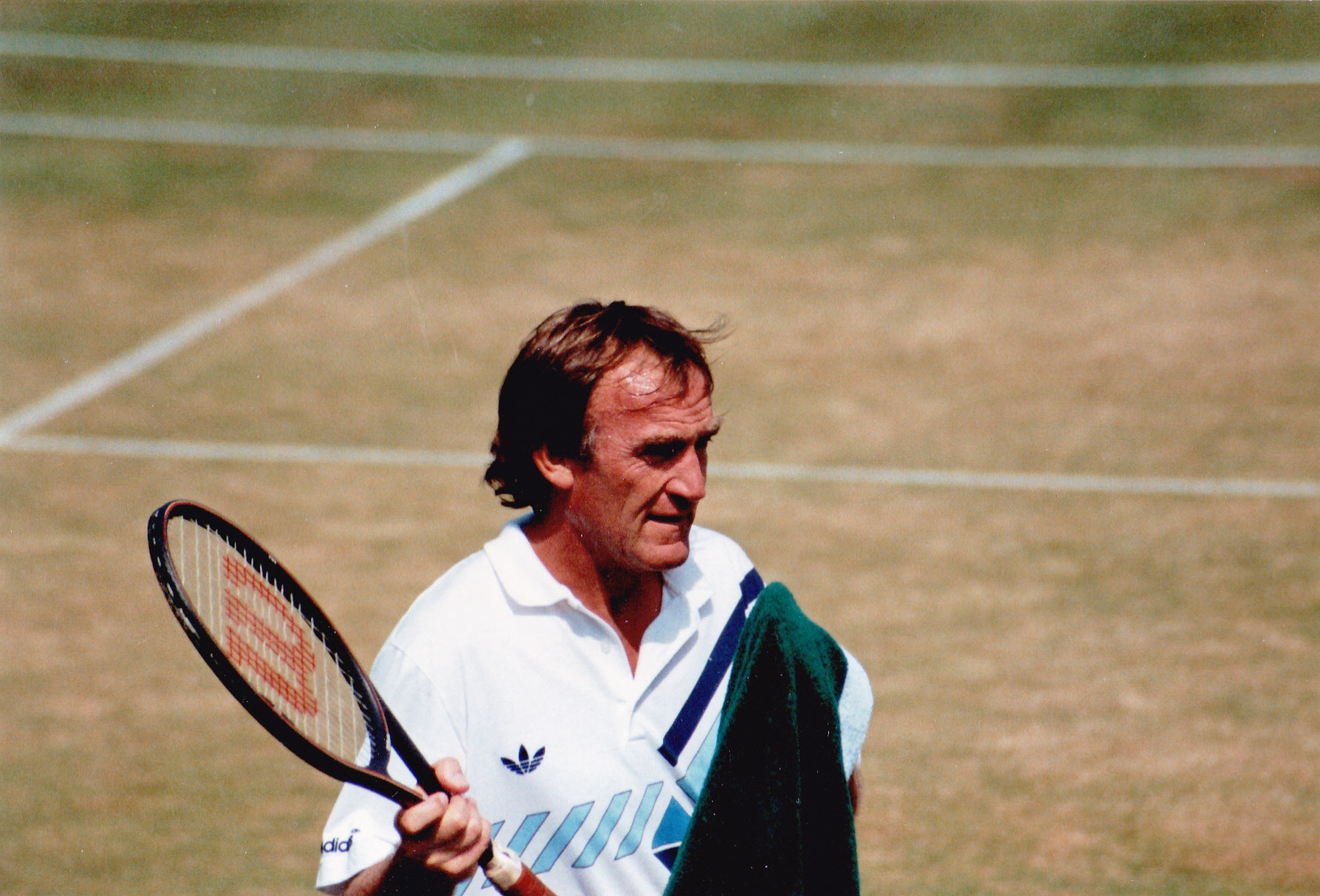
Roche at Wimbledon circa 1983 in mixed doubles

Roche won one singles Grand Slam tournament, the 1966 French Open at Roland Garros, defeating István Gulyás in straight sets in the final. He was runner-up at the French Championships in 1965, where he beat Roy Emerson in four sets in the semi finals before losing to Fred Stolle and 1967, when he lost to Emerson in the final.

=== Professional ===
In January 1968, Roche turned professional, signing with World Championship Tennis, joining other pros like John Newcombe, Cliff Drysdale, Nikola Pilić and Roger Taylor to form the "Handsome Eight". Roche was guaranteed $125,000 annually, an amount equivalent to the annual salary of Willie Mays, the top paid baseball player.

Roche was the leading money winner on the WCT tour in 1968. In the 1968 final in the combined WCT/NTL professional event at Madison Square Garden, Roche defeated Rod Laver in the semifinal and Pancho Gonzales in the final. At Wimbledon 1968 Roche beat Ken Rosewall in the fourth round in straight sets. "Roche played brilliantly. Rosewall never got going and netted shots that should have been winners". He lost in the final in straight sets to Rod Laver. "Roche played a more consistent game, but Laver produced the flashes of genius that won the big points".

Roche held a personal head-to-head edge over Laver during the latter's Grand Slam season of 1969, 5 to 4. At the News South Wales Open in Sydney, Roche beat Laver in the final in four sets. Rod didn't serve well "so Laver had to call upon his impromptu brilliance so many times to win points. He just couldn't keep it up against the tighter play of Roche." The following week Roche and Laver played a classic match against each other in the 1969 Australian Open at Brisbane, two days after Roche had won a five set quarter final against John Newcombe. The Laver-Roche semi final was one of the longest matches played at that stage in tennis history (they were on court for 4 hours and 45 minutes in searing heat). Roche "displayed phenomenal fighting qualities to come from two sets down to get back on level terms with Laver" but Laver won the fifth set. Roche lost in the French Open semi finals to Rosewall and the Wimbledon semi finals to Newcombe. Roche contested the final match of Laver's Grand Slam run that year, the 1969 U.S. Open final, after beating Newcombe in five sets in the semi finals in intense humidity. Laver beat Roche in four sets. The match started late due to rain and the court was dried by a helicopter to get it into a playable condition.

Roche won the U.S. Pro Championships at Longwood, Boston in 1970, defeating Laver in a hard fought five set final. He lost in the 1970 US Open final in four sets against Ken Rosewall.

Roche missed much of the 1972 and 1973 seasons due to an elbow injury to his playing arm. He had surgery and then visited a faith healer in Manila. He returned to regular play in 1974 and in December that year won his first title in more than two years when he beat Phil Dent in the final in five sets on a windy day to win the New South Wales championships. At the 1975 Australian Open, Roche led Newcombe 5-2 in the fifth set and had 3 match points before losing their semi final. After beating Ken Rosewall in the fourth round, Roche lost in five sets in the Wimbledon 1975 semi finals to Arthur Ashe.

Roche won his fourth New South Wales title (his first title was in the amateur era) by volleying well to beat Dick Stockton in the 1976 final in four sets. Perhaps one of his greatest achievements came in 1977, playing singles in the finals of the Davis Cup tournament versus Italy, nearly 10 years since he had last played for Australia. In the tie, Roche upset top Italian Adriano Panatta in three straight sets to lead Australia to a 3–1 victory, winning the Davis Cup. One of his last great victories was in the final of Queen's in 1978, when the 33-year-old Roche beat 19-year-old John McEnroe in "as good a final as Queen's have had".

Shoulder and elbow injuries cut short his career after having finished in the top 10 for six consecutive years.

== Coaching career ==
After completing his playing career, Roche has developed a highly successful career as a tennis coach. He was the player-coach of the Denver Racquets who won the first World Team Tennis in competition 1974, and he was named WTT Coach of the Year. Ivan Lendl hired Roche in 1985 as a full-time coach for Roche's advice on volleying. Lendl dreamed of winning Wimbledon, and because Roche had been a fine grass court player, he sought his tutelage. Roche also coached former world no. 1 Patrick Rafter from 1997 to the end of his career in 2002. Roche coached world no. 1 Roger Federer from 2005 to 12 May 2007. It is reputed this was on a "handshake agreement" with no contract; Roche was paid by the week. Federer hired Roche for the opposite reason that Lendl hired him: to work on his clay-court game (as Roche had won the 1966 French Championships). He also coached two-time Grand Slam singles titlist Lleyton Hewitt, who was aiming to get his career back on track after a number of unsuccessful years on the ATP Tour.

== Honours ==
Roche was made a Member of the Order of the British Empire (MBE) in the 1981 Birthday Honours and an Officer of the Order of Australia (AO) in 2001. He entered the International Tennis Hall of Fame alongside doubles partner and close friend John Newcombe in 1986. In 1990 he was inducted into the Sport Australia Hall of Fame. He received an Australian Sports Medal in 2000 and a Centenary Medal in 2001.

== Grand Slam finals ==
=== Singles: 6 (1 title / 5 runners-up) ===
Result	Year	Championship	Surface	Opponent	Score
Loss	1965	French Championships	Clay	(Australia) Fred Stolle	6–3, 0–6, 2–6, 3–6
Win	1966	French Championships	Clay	(Hungary) István Gulyás	6–1, 6–4, 7–5
Loss	1967	French Championships	Clay	(Australia) Roy Emerson	1–6, 4–6, 6–2, 2–6
↓ Open Era ↓
Loss	1968	Wimbledon	Grass	(Australia) Rod Laver	3–6, 4–6, 2–6
Loss	1969	US Open	Grass	(Australia) Rod Laver	9–7, 1–6, 2–6, 2–6
Loss	1970	US Open	Grass	(Australia) Ken Rosewall	6–2, 4–6, 6–7, 3–6

=== Doubles: 15 (13 titles / 2 runners-up) ===
Result	Year	Championship	Surface	Partner	Opponents	Score
Loss	1964	French Championships	Clay	(Australia) John Newcombe	(Australia) Roy Emerson (Australia) Ken Fletcher	5–7, 3–6, 6–3, 5–7
Win	1965	Australian Championships	Grass	(Australia) John Newcombe	(Australia) Roy Emerson (Australia) Fred Stolle	3–6, 4–6, 13–11, 6–3, 6–4
Win	1965	Wimbledon Championships	Grass	(Australia) John Newcombe	(Australia) Ken Fletcher (South Africa) Bob Hewitt	7–5, 6–3, 6–4
Loss	1966	Australian Championships (2)	Grass	(Australia) John Newcombe	(Australia) Roy Emerson (Australia) Fred Stolle	9–7, 3–6, 8–6, 12–14, 10–12
Win	1967	Australian Championships (2)	Grass	(Australia) John Newcombe	(Australia) Bill Bowrey (Australia) Owen Davidson	3–6, 6–3, 7–5, 6–8, 8–6
Win	1967	French Championships	Clay	(Australia) John Newcombe	(Australia) Roy Emerson (Australia) Ken Fletcher	6–3, 9–7, 12–10
Win	1967	U.S. Championships	Grass	(Australia) John Newcombe	(Australia) Bill Bowrey (Australia) Owen Davidson	6–8, 9–7, 6–3, 6–3
↓ Open Era ↓
Win	1968	Wimbledon (2)	Grass	(Australia) John Newcombe	(Australia) Ken Fletcher (Australia) Ken Rosewall	3–6, 8–6, 5–7, 14–12, 6–3
Win	1969	French Open (2)	Clay	(Australia) John Newcombe	(Australia) Roy Emerson (Australia) Rod Laver	4–6, 6–1, 3–6, 6–4, 6–4
Win	1969	Wimbledon (3)	Grass	(Australia) John Newcombe	(Netherlands) Tom Okker (United States) Marty Riessen	7–5, 11–9, 6–3
Win	1970	Wimbledon (4)	Grass	(Australia) John Newcombe	(Australia) Ken Rosewall (Australia) Fred Stolle	10–8, 6–3, 6–1
Win	1971	Australian Open (3)	Grass	(Australia) John Newcombe	(Netherlands) Tom Okker (United States) Marty Riessen	6–2, 7–6
Win	1974	Wimbledon (5)	Grass	(Australia) John Newcombe	(United States) Bob Lutz (United States) Stan Smith	8–6, 6–4, 6–4
Win	1976	Australian Open (4)	Grass	(Australia) John Newcombe	(Australia) Ross Case (Australia) Geoff Masters	7–6, 6–4
Win	1977^{(J)}	Australian Open (5)	Grass	(United States) Arthur Ashe	(United States) Charlie Pasarell (United States) Erik van Dillen	6–4, 6–4

=== Mixed doubles: 5 (2 titles / 3 runners-up) ===
Result	Year	Championship	Surface	Partner	Opponents	Score
Loss	1965	Wimbledon Championships	Grass	(Australia) Judy Tegart	(Australia) Margaret Smith (Australia) Ken Fletcher	10–12, 3–6
Win	1966	Australian Championships	Grass	(Australia) Judy Tegart	(Australia) Robyn Ebbern (Australia) William Bowrey	6–1, 6–3
Loss	1967	Australian Championships	Grass	(Australia) Judy Tegart	(Australia) Lesley Turner (Australia) Owen Davidson	7–9, 4–6
↓ Open Era ↓
Loss	1969	Wimbledon (2)	Grass	(Australia) Judy Tegart	(United Kingdom) Ann Haydon (Australia) Fred Stolle	2–6, 3–6
Win	1976	Wimbledon	Grass	(France) Françoise Dürr	(United States) Rosemary Casals (United States) Dick Stockton	6–3, 2–6, 7–5

== Grand Slam Singles performance timeline ==
Key
W	F	SF	QF	#R	RR	Q#	DNQ	A	NH

(W) winner; (F) finalist; (SF) semifinalist; (QF) quarterfinalist; (#R) rounds 4, 3, 2, 1; (RR) round-robin stage; (Q#) qualification round; (DNQ) did not qualify; (A) absent; (NH) not held; (SR) strike rate (events won / competed); (W–L) win–loss record.

Tournament	1963	1964	1965	1966	1967	1968	1969	1970	1971	1972	1973	1974	1975	1976	1977		1978	1979	Career SR
Australian Open	A	QF	SF	QF	SF	A	SF	QF	3R	A	A	2R	SF	QF	3R	1R	QF	3R	0 / 14
French Open	1R	2R	F	W	F	A	SF	A	A	A	A	A	A	A	A		A	A	1 / 6
Wimbledon	1R	2R	2R	QF	2R	F	SF	QF	1R	A	A	3R	SF	4R	A		1R	A	0 / 13
US Open	3R	QF	A	3R	A	4R	F	F	A	A	A	3R	2R	A	A		A	A	0 / 8
Grand Slam SR	0 / 3	0 / 4	0 / 3	1 / 4	0 / 3	0 / 2	0 / 4	0 / 3	0 / 2	0 / 0	0 / 0	0 / 3	0 / 3	0 / 2	0 / 2		0 / 2	0 / 1	1 / 41

== Open Era career finals ==
=== Singles: 41 (21 titles / 20 runners-up) ===
Result	W-L	Date	Tournament	Surface	Opponent	Score
Win	1–0	1968	Sydney WCT, Australia	Carpet	(Socialist Federal Republic of Yugoslavia) Nikola Pilić	96–33
Loss	1–1	1968	Miami WCT, US	Carpet	(Australia) Butch Buchholz	22–31, 26–31
Loss	1–2	1968	Fresno WCT, US	Carpet	(Australia) Butch Buchholz	23–31, 29–31
Loss	1–3	1968	Baltimore WCT, US	Carpet	(Australia) Dennis Ralston	0–6, 4–6
Loss	1–4	1968	Wimbledon, London	Grass	(Australia) Rod Laver	3–6, 4–6, 2–6
Loss	1–5	1968	Pretoria WCT, South Africa	Hard	(Australia) John Newcombe	9–11, 6–4, 3–6
Win	2–5	1968	Johannesburg WCT, South Africa	Hard	(United States) Butch Buchholz	6-2, 9-7
Loss	2–6	1968	Durban WCT, South Africa	Hard	(Australia) John Newcombe	3–6, 4–6
Loss	2–7	1968	Port Elizabeth WCT, South Africa	Hard	(Australia) Roger Taylor	8–10
Win	3–7	1968	Cape Town WCT, South Africa	Hard	(United States) Cliff Drysdale	6–2, 6–1
Loss	3–8	1968	Kimberley WCT, South Africa	Hard	(Australia) John Newcombe	8–10
Win	4–8	1968	Vienna WCT, Austria	Hard (i)	(United States) John Newcombe	6–4, 7–5
Win	5–8	1968	New York City, US	Carpet	(United States) Pancho Gonzales	6–3, 6–4
Loss	5–9	1969	Hobart, Australia	Grass	(Australia) Fred Stolle	3–6, 6–0, 4–6, 1–6
Win	6–9	1969	Sydney, Australia	Grass	(Australia) Rod Laver	6–4, 4–6, 9–7, 12–10
Win	7–9	1969	Auckland, New Zealand	Grass	(Australia) Rod Laver	6–1, 6–4, 4–6, 6–3
Loss	7–10	1969	Philadelphia WCT, US	Carpet	(Australia) Rod Laver	5–7, 4–6, 4–6
Win	8–10	1969	Hollywood, US	Clay	(Australia) Rod Laver	6–3, 9–7, 6–4
Win	9–10	1969	Oakland, US	Carpet	(Australia) Rod Laver	4–6, 6–4, 11–9
Loss	9–11	1969	Rome, Italy	Clay	(Australia) John Newcombe	3–6, 6–4, 2–6, 7–5, 3–6
Win	10–11	1969	Hamburg, Germany	Clay	(Netherlands) Tom Okker	6–1, 5–7, 8–6, 7–5
Loss	10–12	1969	US Open, New York	Grass	(Australia) Rod Laver	9–7, 1–6, 2–6, 2–6
Win	11–12	1969	Tucson, US	Hard	(Australia) Tom Okker	9–7, 6–1
Win	12–12	1969	Vienna, Austria	Hard	(Australia) Tom Okker	w/o
Loss	12–13	1969	Wembley, UK	Carpet (i)	(Australia) Rod Laver	4–6, 1–6, 3–6
Win	13–13	1970	Australia	Grass	(Australia) John Newcombe	5–7, 7–5, 7–5
Loss	13–14	1970	Melbourne, Australia	Grass	(Australia) John Newcombe	4–6, 4–6, 6–4 ret.
Loss	13–15	1970	Philadelphia WCT, US	Carpet	(Australia) Rod Laver	3–6, 6–8, 2–6
Win	14–15	1970	Dublin, Ireland	Grass	(Australia) Rod Laver	6–3, 6–1
Win	15–15	1970	Gstaad, Switzerland	Clay	(Netherlands) Tom Okker	7–5, 7–5, 6–3
Win	16–15	1970	Boston, US	Hard	(Australia) Rod Laver	3–6, 6–4, 1–6, 6–2, 6–2
Loss	16–16	1970	US Open, New York	Grass	(Australia) Ken Rosewall	6–2, 4–6, 6–7, 3–6
Win	17–16	1972	Washington WCT, US	Clay	(United States) Marty Riessen	3–6, 7–6, 6–4
Loss	17–17	1973	Kansas City, US	Hard	(Australia) Charlie Pasarell	1–6, 6–3, 3–6
Loss	17–18	1974	Bombay, India	Clay	(New Zealand) Onny Parun	3–6, 3–6, 6–7
Win	18–18	1974	Sydney, Australia	Grass	(Australia) Phil Dent	7–6, 4–6, 3–6, 6–2, 8–6
Loss	18–19	1975	Nottingham, UK	Grass	(Netherlands) Tom Okker	1–6, 6–3, 3–6
Win	19–19	1976	Charlotte WCT, US	Carpet	(United States) Vitas Gerulaitis	6–3, 3–6, 6–1
Win	20–19	1976	Sydney Outdoor, Australia	Grass	(United States) Dick Stockton	6–3, 3–6, 6–3, 6–4
Loss	20–20	1977	Brisbane, Australia	Grass	(United States) Vitas Gerulaitis	7–6, 1–6, 1–6, 5–7
Win	21–20	1978	London/Queen's Club, UK	Grass	(United States) John McEnroe	8–6, 9–7

=== Doubles 31 (13 titles / 18 runners-up) ===
Result	W-L	Date	Tournament	Surface	Partner	Opponents	Score
Win	1–0	Jul 1968	Wimbledon, London	Grass	(Australia) John Newcombe	(Australia) Ken Rosewall (Australia) Fred Stolle	3–6, 8–6, 5–7, 14–12, 6–3
Loss	1–1	Aug 1968	Hamburg, Germany	Clay	(Australia) John Newcombe	(Netherlands) Tom Okker (United States) Marty Riessen	4–6, 4–6, 5–7
Loss	1–2	Jan 1969	Hobart, Australia	Grass	(Australia) Fred Stolle	(Australia) Mal Anderson (United Kingdom) Roger Taylor	5–7, 3–6, 6–4, 6–1, 4–6
Loss	1–3	Feb 1969	Philadelphia WCT, US	Carpet	(Australia) John Newcombe	(Netherlands) Tom Okker (United States) Marty Riessen	6–8, 4–6
Win	2–3	Jun 1969	French Open, Paris	Clay	(Australia) John Newcombe	(Australia) Roy Emerson (Australia) Rod Laver	4–6, 6–1, 3–6, 6–4, 6–4
Win	3–3	Jul 1969	Wimbledon, London	Grass	(Australia) John Newcombe	(Netherlands) Tom Okker (United States) Marty Riessen	7–5, 11–9, 6–3
Win	4–3	Jul 1970	Wimbledon, London	Grass	(Australia) John Newcombe	(Australia) Ken Rosewall (Australia) Fred Stolle	10–8, 6–3, 6–1
Win	5–3	Aug 1970	Louisville, US	Hard	(Australia) John Newcombe	(Australia) Roy Emerson (Australia) Rod Laver	8–6, 5–7, 6–4
Win	6–3	Mar 1971	Australian Open, Melbourne	Grass	(Australia) John Newcombe	(Netherlands) Tom Okker (United States) Marty Riessen	6–2, 7–6
Win	7–3	Apr 1971	Miami WCT, US	Hard	(Australia) John Newcombe	(Australia) Roy Emerson (Australia) Rod Laver	7–6, 7–6
Loss	7–4	Mar 1971	Chicago WCT, US	Carpet	(Australia) John Newcombe	(Netherlands) Tom Okker (United States) Marty Riessen	6–7, 6–4, 6–7
Win	8–4	May 1971	Rome, Italy	Clay	(Australia) John Newcombe	(Spain) Andrés Gimeno (United Kingdom) Roger Taylor	6–4, 6–4
Win	9–4	May 1971	Tehran WCT, Iran	Clay	(Australia) John Newcombe	(Australia) Bob Carmichael (Australia) Ray Ruffels	6–4, 6–7, 6–1
Loss	9–5	Feb 1972	Richmond WCT, US	Carpet	(Australia) John Newcombe	(Netherlands) Tom Okker (United States) Marty Riessen	6–7, 6–7
Loss	9–6	Feb 1972	Philadelphia WCT, US	Carpet	(Australia) John Newcombe	(United States) Arthur Ashe (United States) Bob Lutz	3–6, 7–6, 3–6
Loss	9–7	Apr 1972	Charlotte WCT, US	Clay	(Australia) John Newcombe	(Netherlands) Tom Okker (United States) Marty Riessen	4–6, 6–4, 6–7
Loss	9–8	May 1972	Las Vegas WCT, US	Hard	(Australia) John Newcombe	(Australia) Roy Emerson (Australia) Rod Laver	DEF
Win	10–8	Jul 1972	St. Louis WCT, US	Carpet	(Australia) John Newcombe	(Australia) John Alexander (Australia) Phil Dent	7–6, 6–2
Loss	10–9	Jul 1972	Washington WCT, US	Clay	(Australia) John Newcombe	(Netherlands) Tom Okker (United States) Marty Riessen	6–3, 3–6, 2–6
Win	11–9	Aug 1972	Boston WCT, US	Hard	(Australia) John Newcombe	(United States) Arthur Ashe (United States) Bob Lutz	6–3, 1–6, 7–6
Win	12–9	Feb 1974	Toronto WCT, Canada	Carpet	(Mexico) Raúl Ramírez	(Netherlands) Tom Okker (United States) Marty Riessen	6–3, 2–6, 6–4
Loss	12–10	Apr 1974	Monte Carlo WCT, Monaco	Clay	(Spain) Manuel Orantes	(Australia) John Alexander (Australia) Phil Dent	6–7, 6–4, 6–7, 3–6
Win	13–10	Jul 1974	Wimbledon, London	Grass	(Australia) John Newcombe	(United States) Bob Lutz (United States) Stan Smith	8–6, 6–4, 6–4
Loss	13–11	Oct 1974	Sydney Indoor, Australia	Hard (i)	(Australia) John Newcombe	(Australia) Ross Case (Australia) Geoff Masters	4–6, 4–6
Win	14–11	Jan 1976	Australian Open, Melbourne	Grass	(Australia) John Newcombe	(Australia) Ross Case (Australia) Geoff Masters	7–6, 6–4
Win	15–11	Apr 1976	Charlotte WCT, US	Carpet	(Australia) John Newcombe	(United States) Vitas Gerulaitis (United States) Gene Mayer	6–3, 7–5
Win	16–11	1977	Australian Open, Melbourne	Grass	(United States) Arthur Ashe	(United States) Charlie Pasarell (United States) Erik van Dillen	6–4, 6–4
Loss	16–12	Feb 1977	Richmond WCT, US	Carpet	(Australia) Ross Case	(Poland) Wojtek Fibak (Netherlands) Tom Okker	4–6, 4–6
Loss	16–13	Feb 1977	Toronto Indoor WCT, Canada	Carpet	(Australia) Ross Case	(Poland) Wojtek Fibak (Netherlands) Tom Okker	4–6, 1–6
Win	17–13	Oct 1977	Sydney Indoor, Australia	Hard (i)	(Australia) John Newcombe	(Australia) Ross Case (Australia) Geoff Masters	6–7, 6–3, 6–1
Win	18–13	Oct 1978	Sydney Indoor, Australia	Hard (i)	(Australia) John Newcombe	(Australia) Mark Edmondson (Australia) John Marks	6–4, 6–3

Source: ATP
