= National Tennis League =

Men's professional tennis governing body

- Sport: Professional tennis
- Abbreviation: NTL
- Founded: 1968-1969
- Location: United States
- Replaced: 1970 by WCT

National Tennis League (NTL) was a tour for professional male tennis players established in 1967 by George MacCall. In 1970 it was sold to the World Championship Tennis (WCT), a competing professional tennis league run by Lamar Hunt.

== History ==
The National Tennis League (NTL) was formed by former U.S. Davis Cup captain George MacCall in 1967, as a governing body to an American professional tennis tour. MacCall signed several players to contracts, including Arthur Ashe, Rod Laver, Roy Emerson and Stan Smith.

The NTL followed in the wake of MacCall's departure from the existing International Professional Tennis Association (IPTA), which had been created by promoter Wallace Dill in 1966, and preceded the creation of World Championship Tennis (WCT), formed by Lamar Hunt and David Dixon The NTL differed from the IPTA and from WCT in being the first to sign women to professional contracts in addition to men.

In 1968 Billie Jean King became the first woman of the Open Era to sign a pro contract to tour, in a group with Rosie Casals, Françoise Dürr and Ann Haydon-Jones as the women's section of the National Tennis League. "On April 1, 1968, we signed with the National Tennis League, as George MacCall's troupe was called. Frankie (Durr) and Rosie (Casals) received a guarantee of $20,000 per annum for two years, mine (Ann Haydon-Jones) was $25,000 and Billie Jean King's was $40,000. George envisaged us playing a lot of matches and tournaments amongst ourselves and did not expect us to be as much involved in open tennis as later proved to be the case....We joined the six men that he already controlled - Emerson, Laver, Gimeno, Gonzales, Rosewall and Stolle. A group of ten was an attractive proposition to offer and he believed he was going to do very well from it. His main problem was one of administration. He had to keep flying all over the world to tie up arrangements with the various associations but didn't leave sufficient time to organize his professional tours in America, the most important part of the operation, and didn't seem to be able or willing to delegate."

In June 1969 Fred Podesta's formed Tennis Champions Inc. and became the parent company of the NTL with Podesta as president and MacCall as executive director.

Nevertheless, except for the 1969 and 1971 tournaments, many of the best players missed the Australian Open, because of the remoteness, the inconvenient dates (around Christmas and New Year's Day), and the low prize money. In 1970 the National Tennis League (NTL), which employed Rod Laver, Ken Rosewall, Andrés Gimeno, Pancho Gonzales, Roy Emerson and Fred Stolle, prevented its players from entering the tournament because the guarantees were insufficient. The tournament was ultimately won by Arthur Ashe.

Both professional organizations, the NTL and WCT, banned their contracted players from contesting the grand slams at some stage during their short tenure and this made the International Lawn Tennis Federation, the predecessor of the current ITF, very nervous. That was the catalyst that led to the abandonment of the distinction between amateur and professional tennis players and by 1968, the beginning of the Open Era, all tennis players could compete in all tennis tournaments George MacCall sold the NTL's player contracts to Lamar Hunt in July 1970. He became the first Commissioner of World Team Tennis in 1974. Some of the players he signed to contracts were: Rod Laver, Ken Rosewall, Roy Emerson, Pancho Gonzales, Fred Stolle, Billie Jean King and Rosie Casals. He traveled the world to sign players. Many tournaments had to get their players through George.

== NTL tours ==
- 1968 Men's National Tennis League
- 1969 Men's National Tennis League

== 1969 NTL earnings ==
Source.

1. Rod Laver: 30 weeks, $123,405
2. Roy Emerson: 30 weeks, $62,655
3. Ken Rosewall: 20 weeks, $46,800
4. Pancho Gonzales: 22 weeks, $46,320
5. Fred Stolle: 28 weeks, $43,115
6. Andrés Gimeno: 21 weeks, $35,115

== See also ==
- Grand Prix tennis tournaments
- USTA
- International Tennis Federation
