= 1973 World Championship Tennis circuit =

Tennis circuit

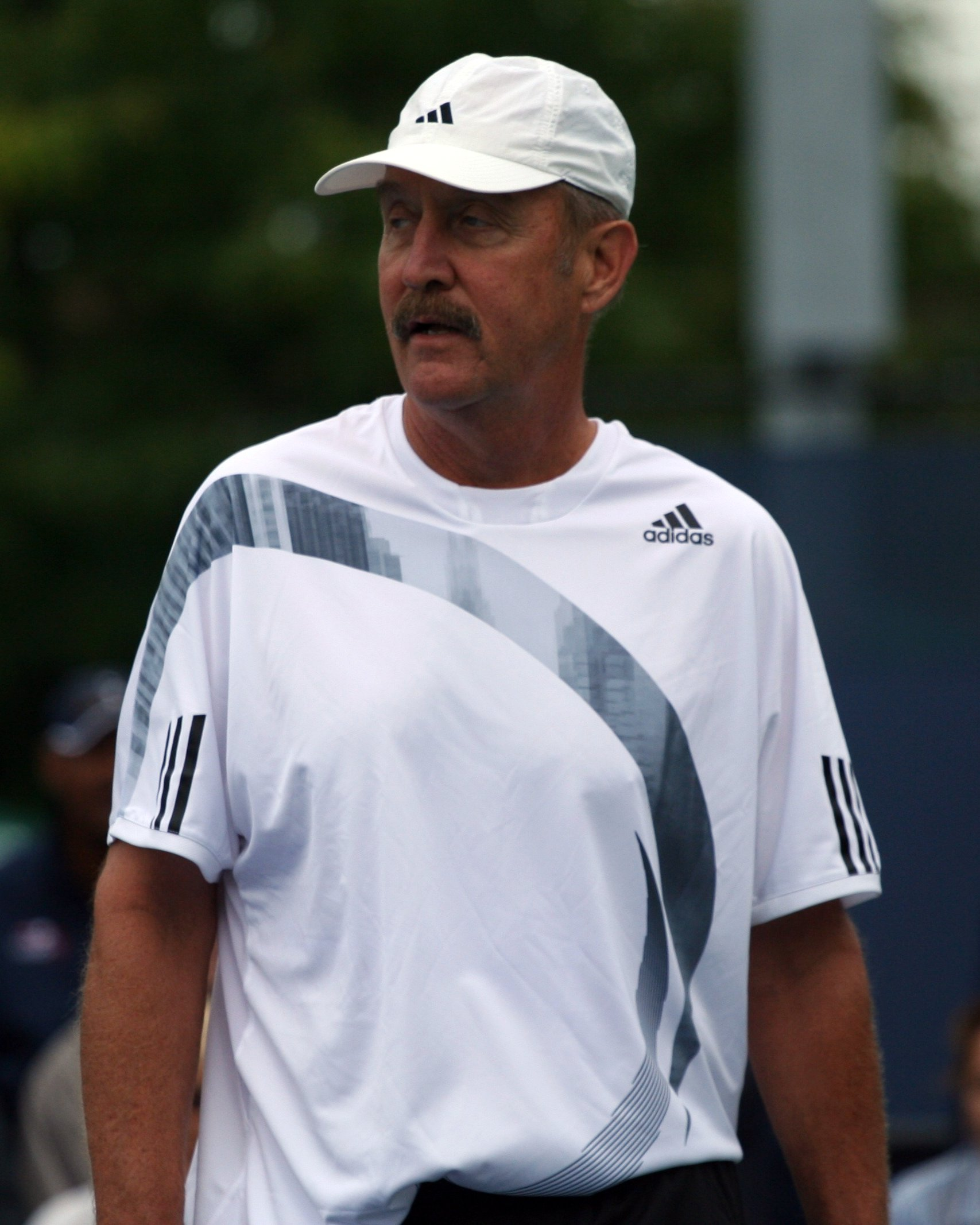
- Smith won 7 titles

Details
- Duration: 15 January 1973 – 9 May 1973
- Edition: 6th
- Tournaments: 23

Achievements (singles)
- Most titles: (United States) Stan Smith (7)
- Most finals: (United States) Stan Smith (8)
- Points leader: (United States) Stan Smith (75)

The 1973 World Championship Tennis circuit was one of the two rival professional male tennis circuits of 1973. It was organized by World Championship Tennis (WCT). In April 1972 WCT signed an agreement with the International Lawn Tennis Federation (ILTF) as a result of which the 1973 men's tennis season was divided in a WCT section, which ran from January until May, and a Grand Prix circuit which was held from May onward. The WCT Circuit divided the players into two groups of 32 players, with each group playing 11 tournaments of the 22 tournaments. The four highest ranked players from each group qualified for the season finals in Dallas. The total available prize money was almost $1,250,000.

== Schedule ==
The schedule of events on the 1973 WCT circuit, with player progression documented until the quarterfinals stage.

Key

Tour Finals
Group A Tournaments
Group B Tournaments

=== January ===
Week	Tournament	Champions	Runners-up	Semifinalists	Quarterfinalists
15 Jan	Saga Bay Classic; Miami, United States; Group A Hard – $50,000 – 32S/16D	(Australia) Rod Laver; 7–6^{(7–2)}, 6–3, 7–5	(United States) Dick Stockton	(United States) Bob Lutz (Australia) John Alexander	(Australia) Roy Emerson (United States) Jim McManus (United States) Cliff Richey (United States) Stan Smith
15 Jan	Saga Bay Classic; Miami, United States; Group A Hard – $50,000 – 32S/16D	(Australia) Roy Emerson (Australia) Rod Laver; 6–4, 6–4	(Australia) Terry Addison (Australia) Colin Dibley	(United States) Bob Lutz (Australia) John Alexander	(Australia) Roy Emerson (United States) Jim McManus (United States) Cliff Richey (United States) Stan Smith
18 Jan	Rothmans International; Deeside and London, Great Britain; Group B Hard (i) – $50,000 – 32S/16D	(New Zealand) Brian Fairlie; 2–6, 6–2, 6–2, 7–6	(United Kingdom) Mark Cox	(United States) Arthur Ashe (United States) Marty Riessen	(Netherlands) Tom Okker (Australia) Ken Rosewall (Soviet Union) Alex Metreveli (Australia) Dick Crealy
18 Jan	Rothmans International; Deeside and London, Great Britain; Group B Hard (i) – $50,000 – 32S/16D	(Netherlands) Tom Okker (United States) Marty Riessen; 6–3, 6–3	(United States) Arthur Ashe (United States) Roscoe Tanner	(United States) Arthur Ashe (United States) Marty Riessen	(Netherlands) Tom Okker (Australia) Ken Rosewall (Soviet Union) Alex Metreveli (Australia) Dick Crealy
22 Jan	Michelob Pro–Celebrity Classic; La Costa, United States; Group A Hard – $50,000 – 32S/16D	(Australia) Colin Dibley; 6–3, 7–6^{(8–6)}	(United States) Stan Smith	(Australia) Rod Laver (Australia) Roy Emerson	(United States) Tom Edlefsen (Australia) John Alexander (United States) Harold Solomon (United States) Phil Dent
22 Jan	Michelob Pro–Celebrity Classic; La Costa, United States; Group A Hard – $50,000 – 32S/16D	(Australia) Roy Emerson (Australia) Rod Laver; 6–7, 6–3, 6–4	(Socialist Federal Republic of Yugoslavia) Nikola Pilić (Australia) Allan Stone	(Australia) Rod Laver (Australia) Roy Emerson	(United States) Tom Edlefsen (Australia) John Alexander (United States) Harold Solomon (United States) Phil Dent
29 Jan	Astor Cup Professional Championships; Milan, Italy; Group B Carpet – $50,000 – 32S/16D	(United States) Marty Riessen; 7–6^{(7–4)}, 6–0, 7–6^{(7–3)}	(United States) Roscoe Tanner	(Australia) Ken Rosewall (United States) Tom Gorman	(Australia) Dick Crealy (Australia) Bob Carmichael (United Kingdom) Mark Cox (Netherlands) Tom Okker
29 Jan	Astor Cup Professional Championships; Milan, Italy; Group B Carpet – $50,000 – 32S/16D	(Netherlands) Tom Okker (United States) Marty Riessen; 6–3, 6–3	(Australia) Ken Rosewall (Australia) Fred Stolle	(Australia) Ken Rosewall (United States) Tom Gorman	(Australia) Dick Crealy (Australia) Bob Carmichael (United Kingdom) Mark Cox (Netherlands) Tom Okker
29 Jan	Fidelity Tournament; Richmond, United States; Group A Carpet – $50,000 – 32S/16D; Singles – Doubles	(Australia) Rod Laver; 6–4, 6–3	(Australia) Roy Emerson	(Australia) John Alexander (United States) Dick Stockton	(United States) Cliff Richey (United States) Bob Lutz (United States) Stan Smith (Australia) Phil Dent
29 Jan	Fidelity Tournament; Richmond, United States; Group A Carpet – $50,000 – 32S/16D; Singles – Doubles	(Australia) Roy Emerson (Australia) Rod Laver; 3–6, 6–3, 6–4	(Australia) Terry Addison (Australia) Colin Dibley	(Australia) John Alexander (United States) Dick Stockton	(United States) Cliff Richey (United States) Bob Lutz (United States) Stan Smith (Australia) Phil Dent

=== February ===
Week	Tournament	Champions	Runners-up	Semifinalists	Quarterfinalists
6 Feb	U.S. Professional Indoor; Philadelphia, United States; Group A Carpet – $50,000 – 32S/16D; Singles – Doubles	(United States) Stan Smith; 7–6^{(7–2)}, 7–6^{(7–5)}, 4–6, 6–4	(United States) Robert Lutz	(South Africa) Bob Maud (Socialist Federal Republic of Yugoslavia) Niki Pilić	(United States) Cliff Richey (United States) Dick Stockton (Australia) Rod Laver (Australia) Colin Dibley
6 Feb	U.S. Professional Indoor; Philadelphia, United States; Group A Carpet – $50,000 – 32S/16D; Singles – Doubles	(United States) Brian Gottfried (United States) Dick Stockton; 4–6, 6–3, 6–4	(Australia) Roy Emerson (Australia) Rod Laver	(South Africa) Bob Maud (Socialist Federal Republic of Yugoslavia) Niki Pilić	(United States) Cliff Richey (United States) Dick Stockton (Australia) Rod Laver (Australia) Colin Dibley
11 Feb	Rothmans International; Toronto, Ontario, Canada; Group A Carpet – $50,000 – 32S/16D	(Australia) Rod Laver; 6–3, 6–4	(Australia) Roy Emerson	(United States) Stan Smith (Chile) Jaime Fillol	(United States) Cliff Richey (Australia) Allan Stone (Sweden) Ove Bengtson (United States) Dick Stockton
11 Feb	Rothmans International; Toronto, Ontario, Canada; Group A Carpet – $50,000 – 32S/16D	(Australia) John Alexander (Australia) Phil Dent; 3–6, 6–4, 6–4, 6–2	(Australia) Roy Emerson (Australia) Rod Laver	(United States) Stan Smith (Chile) Jaime Fillol	(United States) Cliff Richey (Australia) Allan Stone (Sweden) Ove Bengtson (United States) Dick Stockton
12 Feb	Professional Championships; Copenhagen, Denmark; Group B Carpet – $50,000 – 32S/16D	(United Kingdom) Roger Taylor; 6–2, 6–3, 7–6^{(7–1)}	(United States) Marty Riessen	(New Zealand) Brian Fairlie (Australia) Ken Rosewall	(United Kingdom) Mark Cox (Czechoslovakia) Jan Kodeš (United States) Erik van Dillen (Australia) Dick Crealy
12 Feb	Professional Championships; Copenhagen, Denmark; Group B Carpet – $50,000 – 32S/16D	(United States) Tom Gorman (United States) Erik van Dillen; 6–4, 6–4	(United Kingdom) Mark Cox (United Kingdom) Graham Stilwell	(New Zealand) Brian Fairlie (Australia) Ken Rosewall	(United Kingdom) Mark Cox (Czechoslovakia) Jan Kodeš (United States) Erik van Dillen (Australia) Dick Crealy
19 Feb	World Professional Championships; Cologne, West Germany; Group B Carpet – $50,000 – 32S/16D	(Czechoslovakia) Jan Kodeš; 6–1, 6–3, 6–1	(Australia) Brian Fairlie	(United Kingdom) Mark Cox (Soviet Union) Alex Metreveli	(United States) Marty Riessen (Australia) Ken Rosewall (Pakistan) Haroon Rahim (United Arab Republic) Ismail El Shafei
19 Feb	World Professional Championships; Cologne, West Germany; Group B Carpet – $50,000 – 32S/16D	(United Kingdom) Mark Cox (United Kingdom) Graham Stilwell; 7–6, 6–3	(Netherlands) Tom Okker (United States) Marty Riessen	(United Kingdom) Mark Cox (Soviet Union) Alex Metreveli	(United States) Marty Riessen (Australia) Ken Rosewall (Pakistan) Haroon Rahim (United Arab Republic) Ismail El Shafei
26 Feb	Kemper International; Chicago, United States; Group B Carpet – $50,000 – 32S/16D	(United States) Arthur Ashe; 3–6, 7–6^{(11–9)}, 7–6^{(7–2)}	(United Kingdom) Roger Taylor	(United States) Tom Gorman (Australia) Dick Crealy	(United States) Marty Riessen (Netherlands) Tom Okker (Australia) Ken Rosewall (South Africa) Ray Moore
26 Feb	Kemper International; Chicago, United States; Group B Carpet – $50,000 – 32S/16D	(Australia) Ken Rosewall (Australia) Fred Stolle; 6–7, 6–4, 6–2	(Egypt) Ismail El Shafei (Australia) Brian Fairlie	(United States) Tom Gorman (Australia) Dick Crealy	(United States) Marty Riessen (Netherlands) Tom Okker (Australia) Ken Rosewall (South Africa) Ray Moore

=== March ===
Week	Tournament	Champions	Runners-up	Semifinalists	Quarterfinalists
19 Mar	Peachtree Corners Classic; Atlanta, United States; Group A Carpet – $50,000 – 32S/16D; Singles – Doubles	(United States) Stan Smith; 6–3, 6–4	(Australia) Rod Laver	(United States) Cliff Richey (South Africa) Cliff Drysdale	(New Zealand) Onny Parun (United States) Dick Stockton (Australia) Allan Stone (South Africa) Robert Maud
19 Mar	Peachtree Corners Classic; Atlanta, United States; Group A Carpet – $50,000 – 32S/16D; Singles – Doubles	(Australia) Roy Emerson (Australia) Rod Laver; 7–6, 6–3	(South Africa) Robert Maud (Rhodesia) Andrew Pattison	(United States) Cliff Richey (South Africa) Cliff Drysdale	(New Zealand) Onny Parun (United States) Dick Stockton (Australia) Allan Stone (South Africa) Robert Maud
19 Mar	Union Trust Classic; Washington, United States; Group B Carpet – $50,000 – 32S/16D; Singles – Doubles	(Netherlands) Tom Okker; 6–3, 6–7^{(4–7)}, 7–6^{(7–3)}	(United States) Arthur Ashe	(United Kingdom) Roger Taylor (Australia) Ken Rosewall	(South Africa) Ray Moore (United Kingdom) Mark Cox (Australia) Dick Crealy (Soviet Union) Alex Metreveli
19 Mar	Union Trust Classic; Washington, United States; Group B Carpet – $50,000 – 32S/16D; Singles – Doubles	(Netherlands) Tom Okker (United States) Marty Riessen; 4–6, 7–6, 6–2	(United States) Arthur Ashe (United States) Roscoe Tanner	(United Kingdom) Roger Taylor (Australia) Ken Rosewall	(South Africa) Ray Moore (United Kingdom) Mark Cox (Australia) Dick Crealy (Soviet Union) Alex Metreveli
26 Mar	Holton Tennis Classic; St. Louis, United States; Group A Carpet – $50,000 – 32S/16D; Singles	(United States) Stan Smith; 6–4, 3–6, 6–4	(Australia) Rod Laver	(South Africa) Cliff Drysdale (Socialist Federal Republic of Yugoslavia) Niki Pilić	(Australia) John Alexander (United Kingdom) Gerald Battrick (United States) Bob Lutz (United States) Cliff Richey
26 Mar	Holton Tennis Classic; St. Louis, United States; Group A Carpet – $50,000 – 32S/16D; Singles	(Sweden) Ove Nils Bengtson (United States) Jim McManus; 6–2, 7–5	(Australia) Terry Addison (Australia) Colin Dibley	(South Africa) Cliff Drysdale (Socialist Federal Republic of Yugoslavia) Niki Pilić	(Australia) John Alexander (United Kingdom) Gerald Battrick (United States) Bob Lutz (United States) Cliff Richey
26 Mar	Rothmans International; Vancouver, British Columbia, Canada; Group B Carpet – $50,000 – 32S/16D	(United States) Tom Gorman; 3–6, 6–2, 7–5	(Czechoslovakia) Jan Kodeš	(United States) Roscoe Tanner (Australia) Ken Rosewall	(Australia) Fred Stolle (United States) Erik van Dillen (France) Pierre Barthès (South Africa) Ray Moore
26 Mar	Rothmans International; Vancouver, British Columbia, Canada; Group B Carpet – $50,000 – 32S/16D	(France) Pierre Barthès (United Kingdom) Roger Taylor; 5–7, 6–3, 7–6	(United States) Tom Gorman (United States) Erik van Dillen	(United States) Roscoe Tanner (Australia) Ken Rosewall	(Australia) Fred Stolle (United States) Erik van Dillen (France) Pierre Barthès (South Africa) Ray Moore

=== April ===
Week	Tournament	Champions	Runners-up	Semifinalists	Quarterfinalists
2 Apr	River Oaks International Tennis Tournament; Houston, United States; Group B Clay – $50,000 – 32S/16D	(Australia) Ken Rosewall; 6–4, 6–1, 7–5	(Australia) Fred Stolle	(Czechoslovakia) Jan Kodeš (Netherlands) Tom Okker	(United States) Arthur Ashe (Czechoslovakia) Vladimír Zedník (United States) Marty Riessen (New Zealand) Brian Fairlie
2 Apr	River Oaks International Tennis Tournament; Houston, United States; Group B Clay – $50,000 – 32S/16D	(Netherlands) Tom Okker (United States) Marty Riessen; 7–5, 7–5	(United States) Arthur Ashe (United States) Roscoe Tanner	(Czechoslovakia) Jan Kodeš (Netherlands) Tom Okker	(United States) Arthur Ashe (Czechoslovakia) Vladimír Zedník (United States) Marty Riessen (New Zealand) Brian Fairlie
2 Apr	Munich WCT; Munich, West Germany; Group A Carpet – $50,000 – 32S/16D	(United States) Stan Smith; 6–1, 7–5	(United States) Cliff Richey	(Australia) John Alexander (United States) Brian Gottfried	(United States) Robert Lutz (Australia) Rod Laver (Sweden) Ove Bengtson (United States) Dick Stockton
2 Apr	Munich WCT; Munich, West Germany; Group A Carpet – $50,000 – 32S/16D	(Socialist Federal Republic of Yugoslavia) Nikola Pilić (Australia) Allan Stone; 7–5, 5–7, 6–4	(South Africa) Cliff Drysdale (United States) Cliff Richey	(Australia) John Alexander (United States) Brian Gottfried	(United States) Robert Lutz (Australia) Rod Laver (Sweden) Ove Bengtson (United States) Dick Stockton
9 Apr	Brussels WCT; Brussels, Belgium; Group A Carpet – $50,000 – 32S/16D	(United States) Stan Smith; 6–2, 6–4, 6–1	(Australia) Rod Laver	(United States) Dick Stockton (Australia) Roy Emerson	(United States) Cliff Richey (South Africa) Cliff Drysdale (Sweden) Ove Bengtson (Australia) John Alexander
9 Apr	Brussels WCT; Brussels, Belgium; Group A Carpet – $50,000 – 32S/16D	(United States) Robert Lutz (United States) Stan Smith; 6–4, 7–6	(Australia) John Alexander (Australia) Phil Dent	(United States) Dick Stockton (Australia) Roy Emerson	(United States) Cliff Richey (South Africa) Cliff Drysdale (Sweden) Ove Bengtson (Australia) John Alexander
9 Apr	Cleveland Tennis Classic; Cleveland, United States; Group B Carpet – $50,000 – 32S/16D	(Australia) Ken Rosewall; 6–3, 6–4	(United Kingdom) Roger Taylor	(South Africa) Raymond Moore (New Zealand) Brian Fairlie	(United States) Arthur Ashe (France) Jean-Baptiste Chanfreau (United States) Marty Riessen (Czechoslovakia) Jan Kodeš
9 Apr	Cleveland Tennis Classic; Cleveland, United States; Group B Carpet – $50,000 – 32S/16D	(Australia) Ken Rosewall (Australia) Fred Stolle; 6–2, 6–3	(Egypt) Ismail El Shafei (New Zealand) Brian Fairlie	(South Africa) Raymond Moore (New Zealand) Brian Fairlie	(United States) Arthur Ashe (France) Jean-Baptiste Chanfreau (United States) Marty Riessen (Czechoslovakia) Jan Kodeš
16 Apr	Carolinas International Tennis Tournament; Charlotte, United States; Group B Clay – $50,000 – 32S/16D	(Australia) Ken Rosewall; 6–3, 7–6^{(7–1)}	(United States) Arthur Ashe	(United States) Roscoe Tanner (United Kingdom) Mark Cox	(United States) Tom Gorman (Australia) Bob Carmichael (Socialist Federal Republic of Yugoslavia) Željko Franulović (United States) Marty Riessen
16 Apr	Carolinas International Tennis Tournament; Charlotte, United States; Group B Clay – $50,000 – 32S/16D	(Netherlands) Tom Okker (United States) Marty Riessen; 7–6, 3–6, 6–3	(United States) Tom Gorman (United States) Erik van Dillen	(United States) Roscoe Tanner (United Kingdom) Mark Cox	(United States) Tom Gorman (Australia) Bob Carmichael (Socialist Federal Republic of Yugoslavia) Željko Franulović (United States) Marty Riessen
16 Apr	Johannesburg WCT; Johannesburg, South Africa; Group A Hard – $50,000 – 32S/16D	(United States) Brian Gottfried; W/O (Note: Fillol defaulted before the final due to illness (flu).)	(Chile) Jaime Fillol	(Sweden) Ove Bengtson (New Zealand) Onny Parun	(United States) Robert Lutz (Rhodesia) Andrew Pattison (Australia) Colin Dibley (United Kingdom) Gerald Battrick
16 Apr	Johannesburg WCT; Johannesburg, South Africa; Group A Hard – $50,000 – 32S/16D	(United States) Robert Lutz (United States) Stan Smith; 6–1, 6–4, 6–4	(South Africa) Frew McMillan (Australia) Allan Stone	(Sweden) Ove Bengtson (New Zealand) Onny Parun	(United States) Robert Lutz (Rhodesia) Andrew Pattison (Australia) Colin Dibley (United Kingdom) Gerald Battrick
23 Apr	United Bank Classic; Denver, United States; Group B Carpet – $50,000 – 32S/16D	(United Kingdom) Mark Cox; 6–1, 6–1	(United States) Arthur Ashe	(United States) Roscoe Tanner (Australia) Ross Case	(New Zealand) Brian Fairlie (United States) Marty Riessen (United States) Tom Leonard (United Kingdom) Roger Taylor
23 Apr	United Bank Classic; Denver, United States; Group B Carpet – $50,000 – 32S/16D	(United States) Arthur Ashe (United States) Roscoe Tanner; 3–6, 6–3, 7–6	(Netherlands) Tom Okker (United States) Marty Riessen	(United States) Roscoe Tanner (Australia) Ross Case	(New Zealand) Brian Fairlie (United States) Marty Riessen (United States) Tom Leonard (United Kingdom) Roger Taylor
23 Apr	Swedish Pro Tennis Championships; Gothenburg, Sweden; Group A Carpet – $50,000 – 32S/16D	(United States) Stan Smith; 5–7, 6–4, 6–2	(Australia) John Alexander	(United Kingdom) Gerald Battrick (Australia) Rod Laver	(Sweden) Ove Bengtson (United States) Cliff Richey (Australia) Roy Emerson (United States) Dick Stockton
23 Apr	Swedish Pro Tennis Championships; Gothenburg, Sweden; Group A Carpet – $50,000 – 32S/16D	(Australia) Roy Emerson (Australia) Rod Laver; 6–7, 6–4, 6–1	(Socialist Federal Republic of Yugoslavia) Nikola Pilić (Australia) Allan Stone	(United Kingdom) Gerald Battrick (Australia) Rod Laver	(Sweden) Ove Bengtson (United States) Cliff Richey (Australia) Roy Emerson (United States) Dick Stockton

=== May ===
Week	Tournament	Champions	Runners-up	Semifinalists	Quarterfinalists
3 May	Masters Doubles WCT; Montreal, Quebec, Canada; Tour Finals; Carpet – $200,000 – 8D	(United States) Robert Lutz (United States) Stan Smith; 6–2, 7–6^{(7–1)}, 6–0	(Netherlands) Tom Okker (United States) Marty Riessen	(Australia) Emerson / (Australia) Laver (Australia) Rosewall / (Australia) Stolle	(Australia) Addison / (Australia) Dibley (Socialist Federal Republic of Yugoslavia) Pilić / (Australia) Stone (United Kingdom) Cox / (United Kingdom) Stilwell (United States) Ashe / (United States) Tanner
9 May	WCT Finals; Dallas, United States; Tour Finals; Carpet – $100,000 – 8S; Singles	(United States) Stan Smith; 6–3, 6–3, 4–6, 6–4	(United States) Arthur Ashe	(Australia) Rod Laver (Australia) Ken Rosewall	(Australia) John Alexander (Australia) Roy Emerson (United States) Marty Riessen (United Kingdom) Roger Taylor

== Statistical information ==
=== Titles won by player ===
Key

Tour Finals
Regular Tournaments
All titles

Total	Player	Singles	Doubles	Singles	Doubles	Singles	Doubles
10	Stan Smith (USA)	1	1	6	2	7	3
8	Rod Laver (AUS)			3	5	3	5
6	Marty Riessen (USA)			1	5	1	5
6	Tom Okker (NED)			1	5	1	5
5	Ken Rosewall (AUS)			3	2	3	2
5	Roy Emerson (AUS)				5		5
3	Robert Lutz (USA)		1		2		3
2	Roger Taylor (GBR)			1	1	1	1
2	Arthur Ashe (USA)			1	1	1	1
2	Tom Gorman (USA)			1	1	1	1
2	Brian Gottfried (USA)			1	1	1	1
2	Mark Cox (GBR)			1	1	1	1
2	Fred Stolle (AUS)				2		2
1	Brian Fairlie (AUS)			1		1	
1	Colin Dibley (AUS)			1		1	
1	Jan Kodeš (TCH)			1		1	
1	Dick Stockton (USA)				1	1	
1	John Alexander (AUS)				1		1
1	Phil Dent (AUS)				1		1
1	Erik Van Dillen (USA)				1		1
1	Graham Stilwell (GBR)				1		1
1	Pierre Barthès (FRA)				1		1
1	Ove Bengtson (SWE)				1		1
1	Jim McManus (USA)				1		1
1	Nikola Pilić (YUG)				1		1
1	Allan Stone (AUS)				1		1
1	Roscoe Tanner (USA)				1		1

=== Titles won by nation ===
Key

Tour Finals
Group A Tournaments
Group B Tournaments
All titles

Total	Nation	Singles	Doubles	Singles	Doubles	Singles	Doubles	Singles	Doubles
23	United States (USA)	1	1	7	4	3	7	11	12
17	Australia (AUS)			4	7	4	2	8	9
6	Netherlands (NED)					1	5	1	5
4	Great Britain (GBR)					2	2	2	2
1	Czechoslovakia (TCH)					1		1	
1	France (FRA)						1		1
1	Sweden (SWE)				1				1
1	Yugoslavia (YUG)				1				1

== Standings ==
Key

Qualified for Tour Finals

Group A
Rk	Name	Country	Matches Played	Matches Won	Points	Prize Money (USD)
1	Stan Smith	USA	46	41	75	154,100
2	Rod Laver	AUS	44	37	63	78,200
3	Roy Emerson	AUS	29	20	28	41,350
3	John Alexander	AUS	33	22	28	31,300
5	Cliff Richey	USA	34	23	27	24,350
6	Dick Stockton	USA	31	20	25	23,200
7	Bob Lutz	USA	27	17	21	41,800
8	Brian Gottfried	USA	20	10	20	20,300
9	Colin Dibley	AUS	23	13	18	22,750
10	Jaime Fillol	CHI	22	13	17	14,300

Group B
Rk	Name	Country	Matches Played	Matches Won	Points	Prize Money (USD)
1	Ken Rosewall	AUS	42	34	53	66,400
2	Arthur Ashe	USA	36	26	41	63,150
3	Marty Riessen	USA	36	26	35	47,200
4	Roger Taylor	GBR	31	21	34	42,800
4	Mark Cox	GBR	33	23	34	31,950
6	Brian Fairlie	AUS	32	22	33	30,900
7	Jan Kodeš	TCH	27	19	28	23,800
8	Tom Okker	NED	29	19	25	34,400
9	Roscoe Tanner	USA	27	16	24	25,250
10	Tom Gorman	USA	25	16	23	28,200

== See also ==
- 1973 Grand Prix circuit
- 1973 USLTA Indoor Circuit
