= 1970 Virginia Slims of Richmond =

- Date: November 5–8
- Edition: 1st
- Category: Virginia Slims
- Draw: 10S / ?D
- Prize money: $8,200
- Surface: Clay (Green) / indoor
- Location: Richmond, Virginia, U.S.
- Venue: Westwood Racquet Club
- Attendance: 7,000

Champions

Singles
- (United States) Billie Jean King

Doubles
- (United States) Rosie Casals / (United States) Billie Jean King
Virginia Slims of Richmond	· 1972 →

The 1970 Virginia Slims of Richmond was a women's tennis tournament played on indoor clay courts at the Westwood Racquet Club in Richmond, Virginia in the United States. It was the inaugural edition of the tournament and was held from November 5 through November 8, 1970. It was the second Virginia Slims tournament after the 1970 Houston Women's Invitation in September and was not sanctioned by the United States Lawn Tennis Association (USLTA). First-seeded Billie Jean King won the singles title and earned $2,400 first-prize money.

== Finals ==
=== Singles ===
(United States) Billie Jean King defeated (United States) Nancy Richey 6–3, 6–3

=== Doubles ===
(United States) Rosie Casals / (United States) Billie Jean King defeated (United States) Mary-Ann Curtis / (United States) Valerie Ziegenfuss 6–4, 6–4

== Prize money ==
Event	W	F	SF	QF
Singles	$2,400	$1,200	$600	$300
