= 1973 Peachtree Corners Classic =

- Date: March 19–25
- Edition: 2nd
- Category: World Championship Tennis (WCT)
- Draw: 32S / 16D
- Prize money: $50,000
- Surface: Carpet / indoor
- Location: Atlanta, Georgia, US
- Venue: Alexander Memorial Coliseum
- Attendance: 47,524

Champions

Singles
- (United States) Stan Smith

Doubles
- (Australia) Roy Emerson / (Australia) Rod Laver
← 1970 ·	Atlanta WCT	· 1974 →

The 1973 Peachtree Corners Classic, also known as the Atlanta WCT, was a men's tennis tournament played on indoor carpet courts at the Alexander Memorial Coliseum in Atlanta, Georgia in the United States that was part of Group A of the 1973 World Championship Tennis circuit. It was the second edition of the tournament and was held from March 19 through March 25, 1973. Second-seeded Stan Smith won the singles title and the accompanying $10,000 first-prize money.

== Finals ==
=== Singles ===
(United States) Stan Smith defeated (Australia) Rod Laver 6–3, 6–4

- It was Smith' 2nd singles title of the year and the 37th of his career in the Open Era.

=== Doubles ===
(Australia) Roy Emerson / (Australia) Rod Laver defeated (South Africa) Robert Maud / (Rhodesia) Andrew Pattison 7–6, 6–3
