= 1973 Peachtree Corners Classic – Doubles =

Tennis tournament event

Doubles
- 1973 Peachtree Corners Classic

Final
- Champion: (Australia) Roy Emerson (Australia) Rod Laver
- Runner-up: (South Africa) Robert Maud (Rhodesia) Andrew Pattison
- Score: 7–6, 6–3

Details
- Draw: 16
- Seeds: 6

Events
Singles	Doubles
← 1970 ·	Atlanta WCT	· 1974 →

The 1973 Peachtree Corners Classic – Doubles was an event of the 1973 Peachtree Corners Classic men's tennis tournament that was played at the Alexander Memorial Coliseum in Atlanta, Georgia in the United States from March 19 through March 25, 1973. The draw comprised 16 players of which six were seeded. Tom Okker and Marty Riessen were the defending doubles champions, but did not compete in this edition. First-seeded Roy Emerson and Rod Laver won the doubles title, defeating unseeded Robert Maud and Andrew Pattison in the final, 7–6, 6–3.

== Seeds ==
1. (Australia) Roy Emerson / (Australia) Rod Laver (champions)
2. (Socialist Federal Republic of Yugoslavia) Nikola Pilić / (Australia) Allan Stone (semifinals)
3. (United States) Brian Gottfried / (United States) Dick Stockton (first round)
4. (Australia) Terry Addison / (Australia) Colin Dibley (quarterfinals)
5. (Australia) John Alexander / (Australia) Phil Dent (quarterfinals)
6. (United States) Bob Lutz / (United States) Stan Smith (semifinals)

== Draw ==
=== Key ===
- Q = Qualifier
- WC = Wild card
- LL = Lucky loser
- Alt = Alternate
- ITF = ITF entry
- PR = Protected ranking
- SR = Special ranking
- SE = Special exempt
- JE = Junior exempt
- JR = Junior Accelerator Programme entrant
- CO = College Accelerator Programme entrant
- NG = Next Gen Accelerator Program entrant
- w/o = Walkover
- r = Retired
- d = Defaulted

First Round
2	(Socialist Federal Republic of Yugoslavia) Nikola Pilić (Australia) Allan Stone	7	7
(United States) Crawford Henry (South Africa) Frew McMillan	6	5
(United Kingdom) Gerald Battrick (Australia) Barry Phillips-Moore	4	0
(United States) Roy Barth (United States) Tom Edlefsen	6	6
5	(Australia) John Alexander (Australia) Phil Dent	5	6	7
(Sweden) Ove Bengtson (Canada) John McManus	7	3	5
(South Africa) Bob Maud (Rhodesia) Andrew Pattison	6	6	6
3	(United States) Brian Gottfried (United States) Dick Stockton	7	2	4
4	(Australia) Terry Addison (Australia) Colin Dibley	6	6
(Brazil) José Edison Mandarino (United States) Harold Solomon	3	3
(South Africa) Cliff Drysdale (United States) Cliff Richey	4	1
6	(United States) Bob Lutz (United States) Stan Smith	6	6
(United States) Frank Froehling (United States) Charlie Pasarell	6	5	5
(Czechoslovakia) Milan Holeček (New Zealand) Onny Parun	4	7	7
(Chile) Patricio Cornejo (Chile) Jaime Fillol	4	4
1	(Australia) Roy Emerson (Australia) Rod Laver	6	6

Quarterfinals
2	(Socialist Federal Republic of Yugoslavia) Nikola Pilić (Australia) Allan Stone	6	6
(United States) Roy Barth (United States) Tom Edlefsen	2	3
5	(Australia) John Alexander (Australia) Phil Dent	6	6	4
(South Africa) Bob Maud (Rhodesia) Andrew Pattison	3	7	6
4	(Australia) Terry Addison (Australia) Colin Dibley	2	2
6	(United States) Bob Lutz (United States) Stan Smith	6	6
(Czechoslovakia) Milan Holeček (New Zealand) Onny Parun	4	6
1	(Australia) Roy Emerson (Australia) Rod Laver	6	7

Semifinals
2	(Socialist Federal Republic of Yugoslavia) Nikola Pilić (Australia) Allan Stone	2	4
(South Africa) Bob Maud (Rhodesia) Andrew Pattison	6	6
6	(United States) Bob Lutz (United States) Stan Smith	6	7	5
1	(Australia) Roy Emerson (Australia) Rod Laver	7	6	7

Final
(South Africa) Bob Maud (Rhodesia) Andrew Pattison	6	3
1	(Australia) Roy Emerson (Australia) Rod Laver	7	6
