= 1970 Campionati Internazionali di Sicilia =

- Date: April
- Edition: 22nd
- Category: Independent
- Surface: Clay / outdoor
- Location: Palermo, Italy

Champions

Singles
- (Hungary) István Gulyás

Doubles
- (Romania) Ilie Năstase / (Romania) Ion Țiriac
- Campionati Internazionali di Sicilia

The 1970 Campionati Internazionali di Sicilia, also known as the Palermo Open, was a men's tennis tournament played on outdoor clay courts in Palermo, Italy. It was the 22nd edition of the tournament and was held in April 1970. It was an independent event, i.e. not part of the 1970 Grand Prix or World Championship Tennis circuits. István Gulyás won the singles title.

== Finals ==
=== Singles ===
(Hungary) István Gulyás defeated (Romania) Ilie Năstase 6–1, 6–4, 6–4

=== Doubles ===
(Romania) Ilie Năstase / (Romania) Ion Țiriac defeated (United Kingdom) John Clifton / (United Kingdom) David Lloyd 17–15, 11–9, 6–1
