= 1970 Atlanta Tennis Classic =

- Date: May 6–10
- Edition: 1st
- Category: World Championship Tennis (WCT)
- Draw: 16S / 8D
- Prize money: $25,000
- Surface: Hard / outdoor
- Location: Atlanta, Georgia, US
- Venue: DeKalb Tennis Center

Champions

Singles
- (Netherlands) Tom Okker

Doubles
- (Netherlands) Tom Okker / (United States) Marty Riessen
Atlanta WCT	· 1973 →

The 1970 Atlanta Tennis Classic, also known as the Atlanta WCT, was a men's tennis tournament played on outdoor hard courts at the DeKalb Tennis Center in Atlanta, Georgia in the United States that was part of the 1970 World Championship Tennis season. It was the inaugural edition of the tournament and was held from May 6 through May 10, 1970. Tom Okker, who survived a match point in his semifinals match against John Newcombe, won the singles title and the accompanying $5,000 first-prize money.

== Finals ==
=== Singles ===
(Netherlands) Tom Okker defeated (United States) Dennis Ralston 6–4, 10–8, 6–2

- It was Okker's 2nd singles title of the year and the 21st of his career in the Open Era.

=== Doubles ===
(Netherlands) Tom Okker / (United States) Marty Riessen defeated (Australia) Roy Emerson / (Ecuador) Pancho Segura 6–4, 6–2

== Prize money ==
Event	W	F	3rd	4th	QF	1R
Singles	$5,000	$3,000	$1,800	$1,200	$900	$500
