= 1973 Peachtree Corners Classic – Singles =

Tennis tournament event

Singles
- 1973 Peachtree Corners Classic

Final
- Champion: (United States) Stan Smith
- Runner-up: (Australia) Rod Laver
- Score: 6–3, 6–4

Details
- Draw: 32
- Seeds: 12

Events
Singles	Doubles
← 1970 ·	Atlanta WCT	· 1974 →

The 1973 Peachtree Corners Classic – Singles was an event of the 1973 Peachtree Corners Classic men's tennis tournament that was played at the Alexander Memorial Coliseum in Atlanta, Georgia in the United States from March 19 through March 25, 1973. The draw comprised 32 players and 12 were seeded. Tom Okker was the defending champion, but did not compete in this edition. Second-seeded Stan Smith won the singles title, defeating first-seeded Rod Laver in the final, 6–3, 6–4.

== Seeds ==
1. (Australia) Rod Laver (final)
2. (United States) Stan Smith (champion)
3. (Australia) Roy Emerson (second round, withdrew)
4. (United States) Bob Lutz (first round)
5. (United States) Dick Stockton (quarterfinals)
6. (Australia) Colin Dibley (second round)
7. (Australia) John Alexander (second round)
8. (United States) Cliff Richey (semifinals)
9. (Socialist Federal Republic of Yugoslavia) Nikola Pilić (second round)
10. (Australia) Phil Dent (second round)
11. (Chile) Jaime Fillol (second round)
12. (South Africa) Bob Maud (quarterfinals)

== Draw ==
=== Key ===
- Q = Qualifier
- WC = Wild card
- LL = Lucky loser
- Alt = Alternate
- ITF = ITF entry
- PR = Protected ranking
- SR = Special ranking
- SE = Special exempt
- JE = Junior exempt
- JR = Junior Accelerator Programme entrant
- CO = College Accelerator Programme entrant
- NG = Next Gen Accelerator Program entrant
- w/o = Walkover
- r = Retired
- d = Defaulted

=== Finals ===
Semifinals
2	(United States) Stan Smith	6	6
8	(United States) Cliff Richey	3	2
(South Africa) Cliff Drysdale	2	1
1	(Australia) Rod Laver	6	6

Final
2	(United States) Stan Smith	6	6
1	(Australia) Rod Laver	3	4

=== Top half ===
First Round
2	(United States) Stan Smith	6	6
(Brazil) José Edison Mandarino	2	2
9	(Socialist Federal Republic of Yugoslavia) Nikola Pilić	6	6
(Rhodesia) Andrew Pattison	2	3
(New Zealand) Onny Parun	7^{7}	6
(Chile) Patricio Cornejo	6^{5}	3
(Australia) Terry Addison	1	2
6	(Australia) Colin Dibley	6	6
8	(United States) Cliff Richey	6	7
(Australia) Barry Phillips-Moore	4	5
(Czechoslovakia) Milan Holeček	1	5
11	(Chile) Jaime Fillol	6	7
(Sweden) Ove Bengtson	3	1
(Australia) Allan Stone	6	6
(United States) Jim McManus	1	3
3	(Australia) Roy Emerson	6	6

Second Round
2	(United States) Stan Smith	6	6
9	(Croatia) Nikola Pilić	4	2
(New Zealand) Onny Parun	7^{7}	6
6	(Australia) Colin Dibley	6^{5}	1
8	(United States) Cliff Richey	6	5	6
11	(Chile) Jaime Fillol	1	7	2
(Australia) Allan Stone	w/o
3	(Australia) Roy Emerson

Quarterfinals
2	(United States) Stan Smith	6	3	6
(New Zealand) Onny Parun	4	6	3
8	(United States) Cliff Richey	6	6
(Australia) Allan Stone	2	1

Semifinals
2	(United States) Stan Smith	6	6
8	(United States) Cliff Richey	3	2

=== Bottom half ===
First Round
4	(United States) Bob Lutz	3	4
(South Africa) Cliff Drysdale	6	6
(South Africa) Frew McMillan	3	4
10	(Australia) Phil Dent	6	6
12	(South Africa) Bob Maud	7^{7}	6
(United States) Crawford Henry	6^{5}	1
(United States) Roy Barth	2	1
7	(Australia) John Alexander	6	6
5	(United States) Dick Stockton	3	6	6
(United Kingdom) Gerald Battrick	6	3	4
(United States) Brian Gottfried	6	4	6
(United States) Frank Froehling	4	6	2
(United States) Charlie Pasarell	7^{7}	2	4
(United States) Harold Solomon	6^{5}	6	6
(United States) Tom Edlefsen	5	5
1	(Australia) Rod Laver	7	7

Second Round
(South Africa) Cliff Drysdale	7	3	6
10	(Australia) Phil Dent	5	6	4
12	(South Africa) Bob Maud	3	7^{8}	6
7	(Australia) John Alexander	6	6^{6}	0
5	(United States) Dick Stockton	6	6
(United States) Brian Gottfried	3	4
(United States) Harold Solomon	3	4
1	(Australia) Rod Laver	6	6

Quarterfinals
(South Africa) Cliff Drysdale	6	6
12	(South Africa) Bob Maud	2	3
5	(United States) Dick Stockton	4	6	5
1	(Australia) Rod Laver	6	4	7

Semifinals
(South Africa) Cliff Drysdale	2	1
1	(Australia) Rod Laver	6	6
