= 1973 Virginia Slims of Richmond =

- Date: March 14–18
- Edition: 3rd
- Category: Virginia Slims circuit
- Draw: 32S / ?D
- Prize money: $25,000
- Surface: Clay (Green) / indoor
- Location: Richmond, Virginia, U.S.
- Venue: Westwood Racquet Club

Champions

Singles
- (Australia) Margaret Court

Doubles
- (Australia) Margaret Court / (Australia) Lesley Hunt
← 1972 ·	Virginia Slims of Richmond

The 1973 Virginia Slims of Richmond was a women's tennis tournament played on indoor clay courts at the Westwood Racquet Club in Richmond, Virginia in the United States that was part of the 1973 Virginia Slims World Championship Series. It was the third edition of the tournament and was held from March 14 through March 18, 1973. First-seeded Margaret Court won the singles title and earned $6,000 first-prize money.

== Finals ==
=== Singles ===
(Australia) Margaret Court defeated (United States) Janet Newberry 6–2, 6–1

=== Doubles ===
(Australia) Margaret Court / (Australia) Lesley Hunt defeated (Australia) Karen Krantzcke / (Netherlands) Betty Stöve 6–2, 7–6^{(5–4)}

== Prize money ==
Event	W	F	3rd	4th	QF	Round of 16	Round of 32
Singles	$6,000	$3,000	$1,900	$1,600	$1,000	?	?
