= 1973 Fidelity Tournament =

- Date: January 30 – February 4
- Edition: 8th
- Category: World Championship Tennis (WCT)
- Draw: 32S / 16D
- Prize money: $50,000
- Surface: Carpet / indoor
- Location: Richmond, Virginia, US
- Venue: Richmond Coliseum
- Attendance: 27,000+

Champions

Singles
- (Australia) Rod Laver

Doubles
- (Australia) Roy Emerson / (Australia) Rod Laver
- Richmond WCT

The 1973 Fidelity Tournament, also known as the Richmond WCT, was a men's professional tennis tournament that was part of the Group A of the 1973 World Championship Tennis circuit. It was held on indoor carpet courts at the Richmond Coliseum in Richmond, Virginia in the United States. It was the eighth edition of the tournament and was held from January 30 through February 4, 1973. First-seeded Rod Laver won his second consecutive singles title at the event and earned $10,000 first-prize money.

== Finals ==
=== Singles ===
(Australia) Rod Laver defeated (Australia) Roy Emerson 6–4, 6–3

- It was Laver's 2nd singles title of the year and the 57th of his career in the Open Era.

=== Doubles ===
(Australia) Roy Emerson / (Australia) Rod Laver defeated (Australia) Terry Addison / (Australia) Colin Dibley 3–6, 6–3, 6–4
