= 1972 Fidelity WCT Tournament =

- Date: February 2–6
- Edition: 7th
- Category: World Championship Tennis (WCT)
- Draw: 29S / 14D
- Prize money: $50,000
- Surface: Carpet / indoor
- Location: Richmond, Virginia, US
- Venue: Richmond Coliseum

Champions

Singles
- (Australia) Rod Laver

Doubles
- (Netherlands) Tom Okker / (United States) Marty Riessen
- Richmond WCT

The 1972 Fidelity WCT Tournament, also known as the Richmond WCT, was a men's professional tennis tournament that was part of the Group A of the 1972 World Championship Tennis circuit. It was held on indoor carpet courts at the Richmond Coliseum in Richmond, Virginia in the United States. It was the seventh edition of the tournament and was held from February 2 through February 6, 1972. First-seeded Rod Laver won the singles title and earned $10,000 first-prize money.

== Finals ==
=== Singles ===
(Australia) Rod Laver defeated (South Africa) Cliff Drysdale 2–6, 6–3, 7–5, 6–3

- It was Laver's 1st singles title of the year and the 51st of his career in the Open Era.

=== Doubles ===
(Netherlands) Tom Okker / (United States) Marty Riessen defeated (Australia) John Newcombe / (Australia) Tony Roche 7–6, 7–6

== See also ==
- 1972 Virginia Slims of Richmond - women's tournament
