= 1973 Union Trust Classic =

- Date: March 19–25
- Edition: 2nd
- Category: WCT (Group B)
- Draw: 32S / 16D
- Prize money: $50,000
- Surface: Carpet / indoor
- Location: Merrifield, Virginia, United States
- Venue: Four Seasons Tennis Club

Champions

Singles
- (Netherlands) Tom Okker

Doubles
- (Netherlands) Tom Okker / (United States) Marty Riessen
← 1972 ·	Washington Indoor	· 1974 →

The 1973 Union Trust Classic, also known as the Washington Indoor, was a men's tennis tournament played on indoor carpet courts at the Four Seasons Tennis Club in Merrifield, Virginia in the United States that was part of Group B of the 1973 World Championship Tennis circuit. It was the second edition of the tournament and was held from March 19 through March 25, 1973. Unseeded Tom Okker won the singles title and earned $10,000 first-prize money after his opponent in the final, fifth-seeded Arthur Ashe, failed to convert two matchpoints in the final set.

== Finals ==
=== Singles ===
(Netherlands) Tom Okker defeated (United States) Arthur Ashe 6–3, 6–7^{(4–7)}, 7–6^{(7–3)}

- It was Okker's 1st singles title of the year and the 28th of his career.

=== Doubles ===
(Netherlands) Tom Okker / (United States) Marty Riessen defeated (United States) Arthur Ashe / (United States) Roscoe Tanner 4–6, 7–6, 6–2

== See also ==
- 1973 Washington Star International
