= 1973 Copenhagen WCT =

- Date: 11–17 February
- Edition: 1st
- Category: World Championship Tennis (WCT)
- Draw: 32S / 16D
- Prize money: $50,000
- Surface: Carpet / indoor
- Location: Copenhagen, Denmark

Champions

Singles
- (United Kingdom) Roger Taylor

Doubles
- (United States) Tom Gorman / (United States) Erik van Dillen
Copenhagen Open	· 1974 →

The 1973 Copenhagen WCT, also known as the Copenhagen Professional Championships, was a men's tennis tournament played on indoor carpet courts in Copenhagen, Denmark. The tournament was part of Group B of the 1973 World Championship Tennis circuit. It was the inaugural edition of the event and was held from 11 February until 17 February 1973. Unseeded Roger Taylor won the singles title.

== Finals ==
=== Singles ===
(United Kingdom) Roger Taylor defeated (United States) Marty Riessen 6–2, 6–3, 7–6^{(7–1)}

=== Doubles ===
(United States) Tom Gorman / (United States) Erik van Dillen defeated (United Kingdom) Mark Cox / (United Kingdom) Graham Stilwell 6–4, 6–4
