= 1972 Fidelity WCT Tournament – Singles =

Tennis tournament event

Singles
- 1972 Fidelity WCT Tournament

Final
- Champion: (Australia) Rod Laver
- Runner-up: (South Africa) Cliff Drysdale
- Score: 2–6, 6–3, 7–5, 6–3

Details
- Draw: 29

Events
Singles	Doubles
← 1971 ·	Richmond WCT	· 1973 →

The 1972 Fidelity WCT Tournament – Singles was an event of the 1972 Fidelity WCT Tournament men's tennis tournament played at the Richmond Coliseum in Richmond, Virginia in the United States from February 2 through February 6, 1972. The draw consisted of 29 players. Ilie Năstase was the defending champion but did not compete in this edition. Rod Laver won the singles title, defeating Cliff Drysdale in the final, 2–6, 6–3, 7–5, 6–3.

== Draw ==
=== Key ===
- Q = Qualifier
- WC = Wild card
- LL = Lucky loser
- Alt = Alternate
- SE = Special exempt
- PR = Protected ranking
- ITF = ITF entry
- JE = Junior exempt
- w/o = Walkover
- r = Retired
- d = Defaulted
- SR = Special ranking

=== Finals ===
Semifinals
(Australia) Rod Laver	6	7
(United States) Arthur Ashe	2	6
(South Africa) Cliff Drysdale	4	6	6
(Australia) John Newcombe	6	4	3

Final
(Australia) Rod Laver	2	6	7	6
(South Africa) Cliff Drysdale	6	3	5	3

=== Top half ===
First Round
(Australia) Rod Laver	6	6
(United States) Roy Barth	3	2
(Socialist Federal Republic of Yugoslavia) Nikola Pilić	6	6
(Australia) Tony Roche	4	2
(United Kingdom) Graham Stilwell	7	7
(New Zealand) Brian Fairlie	6	5
(United States) Bob Lutz	6	6
(United States) Tom Leonard	3	4
(Australia) Roy Emerson	6	6
(Australia) Bill Bowrey	2	2
(United States) Jeff Borowiak	6	6	7
(Australia) Owen Davidson	2	7	5
(United States) Arthur Ashe	6	6
(Australia) Terry Addison	4	4

Second Round
(Australia) Rod Laver	6	6
(Socialist Federal Republic of Yugoslavia) Nikola Pilić	1	1
(United Kingdom) Graham Stilwell	2	1
(United States) Bob Lutz	6	6
(Australia) Roy Emerson	3	6	6
(Australia) John Alexander	6	3	3
(United States) Jeff Borowiak	7	6	2
(United States) Arthur Ashe	6	7	6

Quarterfinals
(Australia) Rod Laver	3	6	6
(United States) Bob Lutz	6	4	4
(Australia) Roy Emerson	5	2
(United States) Arthur Ashe	7	6

Semifinals
(Australia) Rod Laver	6	7
(United States) Arthur Ashe	2	6

=== Bottom half ===
First Round
(South Africa) Cliff Drysdale	6	7
(Egypt) Ismail El Shafei	1	5
(Australia) Bob Carmichael	6	5	6
(United Kingdom) Mark Cox	4	7	3
(United States) Marty Riessen	6	6
(United States) Frank Froehling	2	2
(Australia) John Newcombe	7	7
(Australia) Fred Stolle	6	6
(Australia) Ray Ruffels	6	3	7
(Australia) Phil Dent	2	6	6
(United Kingdom) Roger Taylor	7	6
(Netherlands) Tom Okker	6	3

Second Round
(South Africa) Cliff Drysdale	6	6
(Australia) Bob Carmichael	1	3
(United States) Charlie Pasarell	4	6	6
(United States) Marty Riessen	6	3	4
(Australia) John Newcombe	6	6
(Australia) Ray Ruffels	4	4
(Australia) Allan Stone	6	6
(United Kingdom) Roger Taylor	7	7

Quarterfinals
(South Africa) Cliff Drysdale	6	6
(United States) Charlie Pasarell	4	3
(Australia) John Newcombe	7	3	6
(United Kingdom) Roger Taylor	5	6	4

Semifinals
(South Africa) Cliff Drysdale	4	6	6
(Australia) John Newcombe	6	4	3
