= 1972 Fidelity WCT Tournament – Doubles =

Tennis tournament event

Doubles
- 1972 Fidelity WCT Tournament

Final
- Champion: (Netherlands) Tom Okker (United States) Marty Riessen
- Runner-up: (Australia) John Newcombe (Australia) Tony Roche
- Score: 7–6, 7–6

Details
- Draw: 14

Events
| Singles | Doubles |
| ← 1971 · | Richmond WCT | · 1973 → |

The 1972 Fidelity WCT Tournament – Doubles was an event of the 1972 Fidelity WCT Tournament men's tennis tournament played at the Richmond Coliseum in Richmond, Virginia in the United States from February 2 through February 6, 1972. The draw consisted of 14 teams players. Arthur Ashe and Dennis Ralston were the defending doubles champions but did not compete together in this edition. Tom Okker and Marty Riessen won the doubles title, defeating John Newcombe and Tony Roche in the final, 7–6, 7–6.

== Draw ==
=== Key ===
- Q = Qualifier
- WC = Wild card
- LL = Lucky loser
- Alt = Alternate
- SE = Special exempt
- PR = Protected ranking
- ITF = ITF entry
- JE = Junior exempt
- w/o = Walkover
- r = Retired
- d = Defaulted
- SR = Special ranking

First Round
(Australia) Fred Stolle (Australia) Allan Stone | 6 | 6
(Australia) Terry Addison (United States) Jeff Borowiak | 3 | 4
(Australia) John Newcombe (Australia) Tony Roche | 6 | 6
(Australia) Bill Bowrey (Australia) Owen Davidson | 1 | 4
(United Kingdom) Mark Cox (United Kingdom) Graham Stilwell | 7 | 3 | 6
(Australia) John Alexander (Australia) Phil Dent | 6 | 6 | 1
(United States) Arthur Ashe (United States) Bob Lutz | 6 | 7
(United States) Roy Barth (United States) Tom Leonard | 4 | 5
(Egypt) Ismail El Shafei (New Zealand) Brian Fairlie | 6 | 6
(South Africa) Cliff Drysdale (United Kingdom) Roger Taylor | 2 | 2
(Netherlands) Tom Okker (United States) Marty Riessen | 6 | 2
(United States) Frank Froehling (United States) Charlie Pasarell | 2 | 1^{r}

Quarterfinals
(Australia) Roy Emerson (Australia) Rod Laver | 7 | 6
(Australia) Fred Stolle (Australia) Allan Stone | 5 | 3
(Australia) John Newcombe (Australia) Tony Roche | 7 | 6
(United Kingdom) Mark Cox (United Kingdom) Graham Stilwell | 5 | 2
(Australia) Bob Carmichael (Australia) Ray Ruffels | 6 | 4 | 7
(United States) Arthur Ashe (United States) Bob Lutz | 4 | 6 | 6
(Egypt) Ismail El Shafei (New Zealand) Brian Fairlie | 3 | 6
(Netherlands) Tom Okker (United States) Marty Riessen | 6 | 7

Semifinals
(Australia) Roy Emerson (Australia) Rod Laver | 4 | 6
(Australia) John Newcombe (Australia) Tony Roche | 6 | 7
(Australia) Bob Carmichael (Australia) Ray Ruffels | 1 | 6 | 2
(Netherlands) Tom Okker (United States) Marty Riessen | 6 | 2 | 6

Final
(Australia) John Newcombe (Australia) Tony Roche | 6 | 6
(Netherlands) Tom Okker (United States) Marty Riessen | 7 | 7
