= 1973 Michelob Pro–Celebrity Classic =

- Date: January 22–28
- Edition: 1st
- Category: World Championship Tennis (WCT)
- Draw: 32S / 16D
- Prize money: $50,000
- Surface: Hard / outdoor
- Location: La Costa, California, U.S.
- Venue: La Costa Country Club

Champions

Singles
- (Australia) Colin Dibley

Doubles
- (Australia) Roy Emerson / (Australia) Rod Laver
- La Costa WCT

The 1973 Michelob Pro–Celebrity Classic, also known as the La Costa WCT, was a men's tennis tournament played on outdoor hard courts at the La Costa Country Club in La Costa, California in the United States. The tournament was part of Group A of the 1973 World Championship Tennis circuit. It was the inaugural edition of the event and was held from January 22 through January 28, 1973. Unseeded Colin Dibley won the singles title and earned $10,000 first-prize money.

== Finals ==
=== Singles ===
(Australia) Colin Dibley defeated (United States) Stan Smith 6–3, 7–6^{(8–6)}

- It was Dibley's 1st singles title of the year and the 3rd of his career.

=== Doubles ===
(Australia) Roy Emerson / (Australia) Rod Laver defeated (Socialist Federal Republic of Yugoslavia) Nikola Pilić / (Australia) Allan Stone 6–7, 6–3, 6–4
