= 1970 World Championship Tennis circuit =

1970 WCT circuit
Details
- Duration: 21 January 1970 – 18 October 1970
- Edition: 3rd
- Tournaments: 17

Achievements (singles)
- Most titles: (Australia) Rod Laver (6)
- Most finals: (Australia) Rod Laver (9)
- Prize money leader: (Australia) Rod Laver ($201,453)

The 1970 season of the World Championship Tennis (WCT) circuit was one of the two rival professional male tennis circuits of 1970. It was organized by World Championship Tennis (WCT).

== Tournament schedule ==
Week	Tournament	Location	Draw	Prize Money	Winner	Finalist	Score
21 Jan	Tennis Champions Classic (Note: The Tennis Champions Classic consisted of a series of matches played in various American cities (as well as one in Brisbane, Australia) on nine different dates between January and June and culminating in the semifinals in June and the final played on July 17, 1970, between Rod Laver and Ken Rosewall. The opening round as well as the semifinal and final were played at the Madison Square Garden in New York. The tournament was organized by the National Tennis League (NTL) but included WCT players.)	Various cities		$200,000	(Australia) Rod Laver	(Australia) Ken Rosewall	6–4, 6–3, 6–3
9 Feb	U.S. Pro Indoor	Philadelphia, PA, U.S.	32	$62,500	(Australia) Rod Laver	(Australia) Tony Roche	6–3, 8–6, 6–2
14 Feb	Hollywood Tennis Classic	Hollywood, Florida, U.S.	8S		(Australia) Ken Rosewall	(Spain) Andrés Gimeno	3–6, 6–2, 3–6, 7–6, 6–3
22 Feb	South Texas Pro Championships	Corpus Christi, Texas, U.S.			(Australia) Ken Rosewall	(Australia) John Newcombe	6–2, 6–0
1 Mar	Los Angeles Tennis Classic	Los Angeles, U.S.			(United States) Dennis Ralston	(Australia) Rod Laver	6–4, 4–6, 6–1
11 Mar	World Cup Boston	Boston, U.S.			Australia	(United States) USA	5–2
16 Mar	Dunlop-Slazenger International Open	Sydney, Australia	32S	$28,000	(Australia) Rod Laver	(Australia) Ken Rosewall	3–6, 6–2, 3–6, 6–2, 6–3
18 Apr	Dallas Morning News Tennis Classic	Dallas, Texas, U.S.	Carpet	$25,000	(Spain) Andrés Gimeno	(Australia) Roy Emerson	6–2, 6–3, 6–2
10 May	Atlanta Tennis Classic	Atlanta, U.S.	Hard	$25,000	(Netherlands) Tom Okker	(United States) Dennis Ralston	6–4, 10–8, 6–2
17 May	Howard Hughes Invitational	Las Vegas, U.S.		$50,000	(United States) Pancho Gonzales	(Australia) Rod Laver	6–1, 7–5, 5–7, 6–3
1 Jun	Rawlings Tennis Classic	St. Louis, U.S.	32S	$30,000	(Australia) Rod Laver	(Australia) Ken Rosewall	6–1, 6–4
7 Jun	Moroccan Pro Championships	Casablanca, Morocco	16S		(Australia) John Newcombe	(Spain) Andrés Gimeno	6–4, 6–4, 6–4
2 Aug	Louisville Tennis Classic	Louisville, U.S.	16S	$25,000	(Australia) Rod Laver	(Australia) John Newcombe	6–3, 6–3
23 Aug	Colonial National Invitational	Fort Worth, U.S.		$22,500	(Australia) Rod Laver	(Australia) Roy Emerson	6–3, 7–5
4 Oct	Rothmans Vancouver International	Vancouver, BC, Canada		$40,000	(Australia) Rod Laver	(Australia) Roy Emerson	6–2, 6–1, 6–2
11 Oct	Midland Pro Invitational	Midland, U.S.			(United Kingdom) Roger Taylor	(Australia) John Newcombe	2–6, 7–6, 6–1
18 Oct	Tucson Dunlop Classic	Tucson, U.S.			(United States) Marty Riessen	(Australia) Roy Emerson	6–1, 6–4

== Prize money standings ==
Player	Prize Money
(Australia) Rod Laver	$201,453 (Note: Laver became the first tennis professional to earn more than $200,000 prize money in a year.)
(Australia) Ken Rosewall	$140,455
(Australia) Roy Emerson	$96,845
(Australia) John Newcombe	$78,251
(United States) Pancho Gonzales	$77,365
(Australia) Tony Roche	$67,232
(Netherlands) Tom Okker	$61,797
(Australia) Fred Stolle	$43,448
(United Kingdom) Roger Taylor	$42,101
(Spain) Andrés Gimeno	$41,375

== See also ==
- 1970 Grand Prix circuit
