= Virginia Slims of Richmond =

Defunct tennis tournament
- Event name: Virginia Slims of Richmond
- Tour: WTA Tour
- Founded: 1968
- Abolished: 1973
- Editions: 3
- Location: Richmond, Virginia, U.S.
- Venue: Westwood Racquet Club
- Surface: Clay / indoor

The Virginia Slims of Richmond is a defunct WTA Tour affiliated women's tennis tournament founded in 1968 as the Westwood Indoor Invitation. It was held at the Westwood Racquet Club in Richmond, Virginia in the United States and played on indoor clay courts. The 1970 invitational tournament was the second women's only tennis tournament after the 1970 Houston Women's Invitation.

== History ==
In 1927 the Westwood Golf Club was established as a public club that was active till 1935 when it was closed down. In 1939 it reopened as a private members club called the Westwood Supper Club. In the mid 1940s the venue changed its name to "The Officer's Club of Virginia". In 1955 new tennis courts were constructed at the venue. In 1967 the club changed its name to the Westwood Racquet Club. In 1968 it established a new tennis event called the "Westwood Indoor Invitation usually held in November that ran until 1969. In November 1970, a group of professional women tennis players called the "Original Nine" played in a historical tournament at Westwood. this first all-women's tennis event known as the "Virginia Slims Invitational" that was part of the 1970 ILTF Women's Tennis Circuit that year. Philip Morris, Inc. was the tournaments title sponsor with Westwood Racquet Club as host venue. In 1971 the event was not held however in 1972 it was revived as the Virginia Slims of Richmond that ran til 1973.

== Past finals ==
=== Singles ===
Year	Champions	Runners-up	Score
Westwood Indoor Invitation
1968	(United States) Peaches Bartkowicz	(United States) Stephanie DeFina	6–1, 6–2.
1969	(United States) Peaches Bartkowicz (2)	(United States) Linda Tuero	6–2, 6–0.
Virginia Slims Invitational
1970	(United States) Billie Jean King	(United States) Nancy Richey	6–3, 6–3
Virginia Slims of Richmond
1971	Not held		
1972	(United States) Billie Jean King (2)	(United States) Nancy Richey	6–3, 6–4
1973	(Australia) Margaret Court	(United States) Janet Newberry	6–2, 6–1

=== Doubles ===
Year	Champions	Runners-up	Score
Westwood Indoor Invitation
1968	(Brazil) Maria Bueno (United States) Nancy Richey	(United States) Marilyn Aschner (United States) Peaches Bartkowicz	6–1, 6–2
1969	(United States) Peaches Bartkowicz (United States) Stephanie DeFina	(United States) Darlene Hard (United States) Val Ziegenfuss	6–3, 2–6, 6–3
Virginia Slims Invitational
1970	(United States) Rosemary Casals (United States) Billie Jean King	(United States) Mary-Ann Curtis (United States) Valerie Ziegenfuss	6–4, 6–4
1971	Not held		
Virginia Slims of Richmond
1972	(United States) Rosemary Casals (2) (United States) Billie Jean King (2)	(Australia) Karen Krantzcke (Australia) Judy Tegart	7–5, 7–6
1973	(Australia) Margaret Court (Australia) Lesley Hunt	(Australia) Karen Krantzcke (Netherlands) Betty Stöve	6–2, 7–6^{(5–4)}

== Additional notes ==
In 1959 the Westwood Country Club of St. Louis also established a Westwood Invitation tournament a combined men's and women's tournament played on outdoor clay courts, as opposed to this event that was played on clay indoors. The Westwood Invitation of St.Louis ran until 1969.

== See also ==
- Richmond WCT – men's tournament
