= 1973 Union Trust Classic – Doubles =

Tennis tournament event

Doubles
- 1973 Union Trust Classic

Final
- Champion: (Netherlands) Tom Okker (United States) Marty Riessen
- Runner-up: (United States) Arthur Ashe (United States) Roscoe Tanner
- Score: 4–6, 7–6, 6–2

Details
- Draw: 16
- Seeds: 4

Events
Singles	Doubles
← 1972 ·	Hampton Grand Prix	· 1974 →

The 1973 Union Trust Classic – Doubles was an event of the 1973 Union Trust Classic men's tennis tournament that was played in Merrifield, Virginia in the United States from March 19 through March 25, 1973. The draw comprised 16 teams and four of them were seeded. Cliff Richey and Tom Edlefsen were the defending doubles champions but did not take part in this edition. First-seeded Tom Okker and Marty Riessen won the title, defeating unseeded Arthur Ashe and Roscoe Tanner in the final, 4–6, 7–6, 6–2.

== Seeds ==
1. (Netherlands) Tom Okker / (United States) Marty Riessen (champions)
2. (United Kingdom) Mark Cox / (United Kingdom) Graham Stilwell (semifinals)
3. (Australia) Ken Rosewall / (Australia) Fred Stolle (quarterfinals)
4. (United States) Tom Gorman / (United States) Erik van Dillen (first round)

== Draw ==
=== Key ===
- Q = Qualifier
- WC = Wild card
- LL = Lucky loser
- Alt = Alternate
- ITF = ITF entry
- PR = Protected ranking
- SR = Special ranking
- SE = Special exempt
- JE = Junior exempt
- JR = Junior Accelerator Programme entrant
- CO = College Accelerator Programme entrant
- NG = Next Gen Accelerator Program entrant
- w/o = Walkover
- r = Retired
- d = Defaulted

First Round
2	(United Kingdom) Mark Cox (United Kingdom) Graham Stilwell	7	1	7
(Socialist Federal Republic of Yugoslavia) Željko Franulović (Czechoslovakia) Jan Kodeš	6	6	6
(Australia) Ross Case (Australia) Dick Crealy	7	7
(United States) Fred Drilling (India) Premjit Lall	6	5
(United States) Arthur Ashe (United States) Roscoe Tanner	6	6
(Australia) Bob Carmichael (United States) Dennis Ralston	4	4
(South Africa) Ray Moore (Denmark) Torben Ulrich	6	6	3
3	(Australia) Ken Rosewall (Australia) Fred Stolle	7	3	6
4	(United States) Tom Gorman (United States) Erik van Dillen	6	7	6
(France) Pierre Barthès (United Kingdom) Roger Taylor	7	5	7
(United States) Jeff Borowiak (Pakistan) Haroon Rahim
(France) Jean-Baptiste Chanfreau (United States) Tom Leonard	w/o
(Socialist Federal Republic of Yugoslavia) Boro Jovanović (Soviet Union) Alex Metreveli	6	6	6
(Czechoslovakia) František Pála (Czechoslovakia) Vladimír Zedník	7	4	2
(Egypt) Ismail El Shafei (New Zealand) Brian Fairlie	3	6	1
1	(Netherlands) Tom Okker (United States) Marty Riessen	6	0	6

Quarterfinals
2	(United Kingdom) Mark Cox (United Kingdom) Graham Stilwell	6	6
(Australia) Ross Case (Australia) Dick Crealy	3	4
(United States) Arthur Ashe (United States) Roscoe Tanner	6	3	6
3	(Australia) Ken Rosewall (Australia) Fred Stolle	4	6	3
(France) Pierre Barthès (United Kingdom) Roger Taylor	6	6
(France) Jean-Baptiste Chanfreau (United States) Tom Leonard	4	3
(Socialist Federal Republic of Yugoslavia) Boro Jovanović (Soviet Union) Alex Metreveli	3	6	0
1	(Netherlands) Tom Okker (United States) Marty Riessen	6	3	6

Semifinals
2	(United Kingdom) Mark Cox (United Kingdom) Graham Stilwell	4	6
(United States) Arthur Ashe (United States) Roscoe Tanner	6	7
(France) Pierre Barthès (United Kingdom) Roger Taylor	4	2
1	(Netherlands) Tom Okker (United States) Marty Riessen	6	6

Final
(United States) Arthur Ashe (United States) Roscoe Tanner	6	6	2
1	(Netherlands) Tom Okker (United States) Marty Riessen	4	7	6
