= 1973 Union Trust Classic – Singles =

Tennis tournament event

Singles
- 1973 Union Trust Classic

Final
- Champion: (Netherlands) Tom Okker
- Runner-up: (United States) Arthur Ashe
- Score: 6–3, 6–7^{(4–7)}, 7–6^{(7–3)}

Details
- Draw: 32
- Seeds: 4

Events
Singles	Doubles
← 1972 ·	Hampton Grand Prix	· 1974 →

The 1973 Union Trust Classic – Singles was an event of the 1973 Union Trust Classic men's tennis tournament that was played in Merrifield, Virginia in the United States from March 19 through March 25, 1973. The draw comprised 32 players and four players were seeded. Stan Smith was the defending singles champion but did not take part in this edition. Unseeded Tom Okker won the title, defeating unseeded Arthur Ashe in the final, 6–3, 6–7^{(4–7)}, 7–6^{(7–3)}.

== Seeds ==
1. (United States) Marty Riessen (second round)
2. (New Zealand) Brian Fairlie (first round)
3. (United Kingdom) Roger Taylor (semifinals)
4. (United Kingdom) Mark Cox (quarterfinals)

== Draw ==
=== Key ===
- Q = Qualifier
- WC = Wild card
- LL = Lucky loser
- Alt = Alternate
- ITF = ITF entry
- PR = Protected ranking
- SR = Special ranking
- SE = Special exempt
- JE = Junior exempt
- JR = Junior Accelerator Programme entrant
- CO = College Accelerator Programme entrant
- NG = Next Gen Accelerator Program entrant
- w/o = Walkover
- r = Retired
- d = Defaulted

=== Finals ===
Semifinals
(Netherlands) Tom Okker	6	3	6
3	(United Kingdom) Roger Taylor	4	6	4
(United States) Arthur Ashe	6	5	6
(Australia) Ken Rosewall	4	7	4

Final
(Netherlands) Tom Okker	6	6^{4}	7^{7}
(United States) Arthur Ashe	3	7^{7}	6^{3}

=== Top half ===
First Round
2	(New Zealand) Brian Fairlie	3	6
(United States) Erik van Dillen	6	7
(Netherlands) Tom Okker	6	6
(Australia) Ross Case	1	3
(South Africa) Raymond Moore	7	4	6
(France) Pierre Barthès	5	6	2
(India) Premjit Lall	3	4
(Czechoslovakia) Jan Kodeš	6	6
(Australia) Dick Crealy	7	6
(Czechoslovakia) Vladimír Zedník	6	1
(United States) Butch Buchholz	1	5
(United States) Roscoe Tanner	6	7
(Czechoslovakia) František Pála	w/o
(Pakistan) Haroon Rahim
(United States) Dennis Ralston	3	6
3	(United Kingdom) Roger Taylor	6	7

Second Round
(United States) Erik van Dillen	4	2
(Netherlands) Tom Okker	6	6
(South Africa) Ray Moore	4	6	6
(Czechoslovakia) Jan Kodeš	6	3	1
(Australia) Dick Crealy	7	6
(United States) Roscoe Tanner	5	4
(Czechoslovakia) František Pála	3	7	2
3	(United Kingdom) Roger Taylor	6	6	6

Quarterfinals
(Netherlands) Tom Okker	6	6
(South Africa) Ray Moore	4	4
(Australia) Dick Crealy	3	6	3
3	(United Kingdom) Roger Taylor	6	0	6

Semifinals
(Netherlands) Tom Okker	6	3	6
3	(United Kingdom) Roger Taylor	4	6	4

=== Bottom half ===
First Round
4	(United Kingdom) Mark Cox	6	7
(Denmark) Torben Ulrich	2	6
(United Kingdom) Graham Stilwell	1	1
(United States) Tom Leonard	6	6
(Socialist Federal Republic of Yugoslavia) Boro Jovanović	6	1	4
(United States) Jeff Borowiak	2	6	6
(Egypt) Ismail El Shafei	3	7	0
(United States) Arthur Ashe	6	6	6
(Australia) Ken Rosewall	6	6
(Socialist Federal Republic of Yugoslavia) Željko Franulović	3	4
(United States) Tom Gorman	4	2
(Australia) Fred Stolle	6	6
(Soviet Union) Alex Metreveli	7	3	6
(Australia) Bob Carmichael	5	6	1
(France) Jean-Baptiste Chanfreau	3	5
1	(United States) Marty Riessen	6	7

Second Round
4	(United Kingdom) Mark Cox	6	7
(United States) Tom Leonard	2	6
(United States) Jeff Borowiak	6	2	3
(United States) Arthur Ashe	4	6	6
(Australia) Ken Rosewall	6	6
(Australia) Fred Stolle	3	1
(Soviet Union) Alex Metreveli	6	5	6
1	(United States) Marty Riessen	0	7	1

Quarterfinals
4	(United Kingdom) Mark Cox	2	1
(United States) Arthur Ashe	6	6
(Australia) Ken Rosewall	6	6
(Soviet Union) Alex Metreveli	4	2

Semifinals
(United States) Arthur Ashe	6	5	6
(Australia) Ken Rosewall	4	7	4
