= 1973 Fidelity Tournament – Singles =

Tennis tournament event

Singles
- 1973 Fidelity Tournament

Final
- Champion: (Australia) Rod Laver
- Runner-up: (Australia) Roy Emerson
- Score: 6–4, 6–3

Details
- Draw: 32
- Seeds: 10

Events
| Singles | Doubles |
| ← 1972 · | Richmond WCT | · 1974 → |

The 1973 Fidelity Tournament – Singles was an event of the 1973 Fidelity Tournament men's tennis tournament played at the Richmond Coliseum in Richmond, Virginia in the United States from January 30 through February 4, 1973. The draw comprised 32 players and 10 of them were seeded. Rod Laver was the defending champion. First-seeded Laver won the singles title, defeating seventh-seeded Roy Emerson 6–4, 6–3 in the final.

== Seeds ==
1. (Australia) Rod Laver (champion)
2. (United States) Dick Stockton (semifinals)
3. (Australia) John Alexander (semifinals)
4. (United States) Bob Lutz (quarterfinals)
5. (United States) Stan Smith (quarterfinals)
6. (United States) Cliff Richey (quarterfinals)
7. (Australia) Roy Emerson (final)
8. (United States) Jim McManus (first round)
9. (Rhodesia) Andrew Pattison (second round)
10. (United Kingdom) Gerald Battrick (first round)

== Draw ==
=== Key ===
- Q = Qualifier
- WC = Wild card
- LL = Lucky loser
- Alt = Alternate
- SE = Special exempt
- PR = Protected ranking
- ITF = ITF entry
- JE = Junior exempt
- w/o = Walkover
- r = Retired
- d = Defaulted
- SR = Special ranking

=== Finals ===
Semifinals
1 | (Australia) Rod Laver | 7^{7} | 6
3 | (Australia) John Alexander | 6^{3} | 3
7 | (Australia) Roy Emerson | 6 | 6
2 | (United States) Dick Stockton | 4 | 4

Final
1 | (Australia) Rod Laver | 6 | 6
7 | (Australia) Roy Emerson | 4 | 3

=== Top half ===
First Round
1 | (Australia) Rod Laver | 7 | 4 | 6
(South Africa) Frew McMillan | 5 | 6 | 1
(Australia) Allan Stone | 6^{2} | 5
(United States) Frank Froehling | 7^{7} | 7
(United States) Brian Gottfried | 6 | 6
(New Zealand) Onny Parun | 3 | 1
(Brazil) José Edison Mandarino | 0 | 3
6 | (United States) Cliff Richey | 6 | 6
5 | (United States) Stan Smith | 6 | 6
(Australia) Barry Phillips-Moore | 3 | 3
(South Africa) Bob Hewitt | 2^{r}
(United States) Charlie Pasarell | 3
(Socialist Federal Republic of Yugoslavia) Nikola Pilić | 7^{7} | 6
(United States) Harold Solomon | 6^{3} | 3
(United States) Roy Barth | 2 | 2
3 | (Australia) John Alexander | 6 | 6

Second Round
1 | (Australia) Rod Laver | 6 | 7
(United States) Frank Froehling | 3 | 5
(United States) Brian Gottfried | 0 | 2
6 | (United States) Cliff Richey | 6 | 6
5 | (United States) Stan Smith | 7 | 5 | 6
(United States) Charlie Pasarell | 5 | 7 | 2
(Socialist Federal Republic of Yugoslavia) Nikola Pilić | 6^{4} | 6^{7}
3 | (Australia) John Alexander | 7^{7} | 7^{9}

Quarterfinals
1 | (Australia) Rod Laver | 6 | 6
6 | (United States) Cliff Richey | 4 | 3
5 | (United States) Stan Smith | 6 | 3 | 4
3 | (Australia) John Alexander | 4 | 6 | 6

Semifinals
1 | (Australia) Rod Laver | 7^{7} | 6
3 | (Australia) John Alexander | 6^{3} | 3

=== Bottom half ===
First Round
4 | (United States) Bob Lutz | 6 | 6
(Czechoslovakia) Milan Holeček | 2 | 2
(South Africa) Cliff Drysdale
9 | (Rhodesia) Andrew Pattison | w/o
10 | (United Kingdom) Gerald Battrick | 4 | 6 | 5
(South Africa) Bob Maud | 6 | 3 | 7
(Australia) Terry Addison | 1 | 6 | 4
7 | (Australia) Roy Emerson | 6 | 2 | 6
8 | (United States) Jim McManus | 3 | 4
(Chile) Jaime Fillol | 6 | 6
(Australia) Phil Dent | 6 | 6
(United States) Tom Edlefsen | 2 | 2
(Sweden) Ove Bengtson | 3 | 2
(Australia) Colin Dibley | 6 | 6
(Chile) Patricio Cornejo | 5 | 3
2 | (United States) Dick Stockton | 7 | 6

Second Round
4 | (United States) Bob Lutz | 6 | 6
9 | (Rhodesia) Andrew Pattison | 3 | 3
(South Africa) Bob Maud | 6 | 6^{5} | 1
7 | (Australia) Roy Emerson | 3 | 7^{7} | 6
(Chile) Jaime Fillol | 6^{6} | 2
(Australia) Phil Dent | 7^{8} | 6
(Australia) Colin Dibley | 6^{4} | 6^{3}
2 | (United States) Dick Stockton | 7^{7} | 7^{7}

Quarterfinals
4 | (United States) Bob Lutz | 4 | 6 | 2
7 | (Australia) Roy Emerson | 6 | 3 | 6
(Australia) Phil Dent | 6 | 6^{3} | 6^{7}
2 | (United States) Dick Stockton | 2 | 7^{7} | 7^{9}

Semifinals
7 | (Australia) Roy Emerson | 6 | 6
2 | (United States) Dick Stockton | 4 | 4
