= 1973 Fidelity Tournament – Doubles =

Tennis tournament event

Doubles
- 1973 Fidelity Tournament

Final
- Champion: (Australia) Roy Emerson (Australia) Rod Laver
- Runner-up: (Australia) Terry Addison (Australia) Colin Dibley
- Score: 3–6, 6–3, 6–4

Details
- Draw: 16
- Seeds: 6

Events
Singles	Doubles
← 1972 ·	Richmond WCT	· 1974 →

The 1973 Fidelity Tournament – Doubles was an event of the 1973 Fidelity Tournament men's tennis tournament played at the Richmond Coliseum in Richmond, Virginia in the United States from January 30 through February 4, 1973. The draw comprised 16 teams and four of them were seeded. Tom Okker and Marty Riessen were the defending doubles champions but did not compete in this edition. First-seeded Roy Emerson and Rod Laver won the doubles title, defeating the second-seeded team of Terry Addison and Colin Dibley in the final, 3–6, 6–3, 6–4.

== Seeds ==
1. (Australia) Roy Emerson / (Australia) Rod Laver (Champions)
2. (Australia) Terry Addison / (Australia) Colin Dibley (Final)
3. (South Africa) Bob Maud / (Zimbabwe) Andrew Pattison (First round)
4. (Croatia) Nikola Pilić / (Australia) Allan Stone (Quarterfinals)
5. (United States) Bob Lutz / (United States) Stan Smith (Semifinals)
6. (Australia) John Alexander / (Australia) Phil Dent (First round)

== Draw ==
=== Key ===
- Q = Qualifier
- WC = Wild card
- LL = Lucky loser
- Alt = Alternate
- SE = Special exempt
- PR = Protected ranking
- ITF = ITF entry
- JE = Junior exempt
- w/o = Walkover
- r = Retired
- d = Defaulted
- SR = Special ranking

First Round
1	(Australia) Roy Emerson (Australia) Rod Laver	6	6
(Chile) Patricio Cornejo (Chile) Jaime Fillol	2	1
(United States) Frank Froehling (United States) Charlie Pasarell	w/o
(South Africa) Bob Hewitt (South Africa) Frew McMillan
6	(Australia) John Alexander (Australia) Phil Dent	6	6	4
(United States) Brian Gottfried (United States) Dick Stockton	7	3	6
(United Kingdom) Gerald Battrick (Australia) Barry Phillips-Moore	6	4	6
3	(South Africa) Bob Maud (Zimbabwe) Andrew Pattison	4	6	3
4	(Socialist Federal Republic of Yugoslavia) Nikola Pilić (Australia) Allan Stone	6	5	6
(United States) Roy Barth (United States) Tom Edlefsen	3	7	4
(South Africa) Cliff Drysdale (United States) Cliff Richey
5	(United States) Bob Lutz (United States) Stan Smith	w/o
(Brazil) José Edison Mandarino (United States) Harold Solomon	1	2
(Sweden) Ove Bengtson (United States) Jim McManus	6	6
(Czechoslovakia) Milan Holeček (New Zealand) Onny Parun	5	4
2	(Australia) Terry Addison (Australia) Colin Dibley	7	6

Quarterfinals
1	(Australia) Roy Emerson (Australia) Rod Laver	6	6
(United States) Frank Froehling (United States) Charlie Pasarell	4	1
(United States) Brian Gottfried (United States) Dick Stockton	6	4	4
(United Kingdom) Gerald Battrick (Australia) Barry Phillips-Moore	4	6	6
4	(Socialist Federal Republic of Yugoslavia) Nikola Pilić (Australia) Allan Stone	7	3	6
5	(United States) Bob Lutz (United States) Stan Smith	6	6	7
(Sweden) Ove Bengtson (United States) Jim McManus	5	3
2	(Australia) Terry Addison (Australia) Colin Dibley	7	6

Semifinals
1	(Australia) Roy Emerson (Australia) Rod Laver	7	6
(United Kingdom) Gerald Battrick (Australia) Barry Phillips-Moore	6	2
5	(United States) Bob Lutz (United States) Stan Smith	3	6	1
2	(Australia) Terry Addison (Australia) Colin Dibley	6	3	6

Final
1	(Australia) Roy Emerson (Australia) Rod Laver	3	6	6
2	(Australia) Terry Addison (Australia) Colin Dibley	6	3	4
