= 1972 Virginia Slims of Richmond =

- Date: March 21–26
- Edition: 2nd
- Category: Virginia Slims Pro Tour; Grand Prix Circuit
- Draw: 32S / ?D
- Prize money: $18,000
- Surface: Clay (Green) / indoor
- Location: Richmond, Virginia, U.S.
- Venue: Westwood Racquet Club

Champions

Singles
- (United States) Billie Jean King

Doubles
- (United States) Rosie Casals / (United States) Billie Jean King
- Virginia Slims of Richmond

The 1972 Virginia Slims of Richmond was a women's tennis tournament played on indoor clay courts at the Westwood Racquet Club in Richmond, Virginia in the United States that was part of the 1972 Women's Tennis Circuit. It was the second edition of the tournament and was held from March 21 through March 26, 1972. Third-seeded Billie Jean King won the singles title and earned $3,400 first-prize money.

== Finals ==
=== Singles ===
(United States) Billie Jean King defeated (United States) Nancy Gunter 6–3, 6–4

=== Doubles ===
(United States) Rosie Casals / (United States) Billie Jean King defeated (Australia) Judy Dalton / (Australia) Karen Krantzcke 7–5, 7–6

== Prize money ==
Event	W	F	3rd	4th	QF	Round of 16	Round of 32
Singles	$3,400	$2,200	$1,600	$1,300	$800	$400	$100

== See also ==
- 1972 Fidelity WCT Tournament - men's tournament
