= 1974 Peachtree Corners Classic =

- Date: March 25–31
- Edition: 3rd
- Category: World Championship Tennis (WCT)
- Draw: 32S / 16D
- Prize money: $50,000
- Surface: Carpet / indoor
- Location: Atlanta, Georgia, US
- Venue: Alexander Memorial Coliseum
- Attendance: 45,614

Champions

Singles
- (United States) Dick Stockton

Doubles
- (United States) Bob Lutz / (United States) Stan Smith
- Atlanta WCT

The 1974 Peachtree Corners Classic, also known as the Atlanta WCT, was a men's tennis tournament played on indoor carpet courts at the Alexander Memorial Coliseum in Atlanta, Georgia in the United States that was part of the Blue Group of the 1974 World Championship Tennis circuit. It was the third edition of the tournament and was held from March 25 through March 31, 1974. Seventh-seeded Dick Stockton won the singles title and the accompanying $10,000 first-prize money

== Finals ==
=== Singles ===
(United States) Dick Stockton defeated (Czechoslovakia) Jiří Hřebec 6–2, 6–1

- It was Stockton's first singles title of his career.

=== Doubles ===
(United States) Bob Lutz / (United States) Stan Smith defeated (United States) Brian Gottfried / (United States) Dick Stockton 6–3, 3–6, 7–6
