= WCT Atlanta Championships =

Defunct tennis tournament
- Tour: World Championship Tennis
- Founded: 1969
- Abolished: 1986
- Editions: 12
- Location: Atlanta, Georgia, US
- Venue: DeKalb Tennis Center (1969-70); Alexander Memorial Coliseum (1973-75); Omni Coliseum (1976)
- Surface: Hard / outdoors (1969-1970); Carpet / indoors (1973–1976)

The WCT Atlanta Championships was a men's tennis tournament played in Atlanta, Georgia founded in 1969 as the Atlanta Tennis Classic. It ran annually with breaks until 1986. The event was first part of the WCT Circuit from 1970 to 1976, then part of the ITF Grand Prix Circuit from 1978 to 1981, 1985 to 1986. It was played on outdoor hard courts in 1969 and 1970, and on indoor carpet courts at the Alexander Memorial Coliseum in 1973–76.

This tournament was replaced in the tour calendar by the Atlanta Tennis Challenge (1992-2001), that was later succeeded by the Atlanta Open (2010-2024).

== Past finals ==
=== Singles ===
Included:

Year	Champions	Runners-up	Score
1969	(United States) Butch Buchholz	(Australia) John Newcombe	6–4, 5–7, 6–4, 5–7, 6–2
1970	(Netherlands) Tom Okker	(United States) Dennis Ralston	6–4, 10–8, 6–2
1971–72	Not held		
1973	(United States) Stan Smith	(Australia) Rod Laver	6–3, 6–4
1974	(United States) Dick Stockton	(Czech Republic) Jiří Hřebec	6–2, 6–1
1975	(United Kingdom) Mark Cox	(Australia) John Alexander	6–3, 7–6
1976	(Romania) Ilie Năstase	(United States) Jeff Borowiak	6–2, 6–4
1977	Not held		
1978	(United States) Stan Smith	(United States) Eliot Teltscher	4–6, 6–1, 2–1, ret
1979	(United States) Eliot Teltscher	(Australia) John Alexander	6–3, 4–6, 6–2
1980	(United States) Eliot Teltscher	(United States) Terry Moor	6–2, 6–2
1981	(United States) Mel Purcell	(France) Gilles Moretton	6–4, 6–2
1982-84	Not held		
1985	(United States) John McEnroe	(United States) Paul Annacone	7–6, 7–6, 6–2
1986	(South Africa) Kevin Curren	(United States) Tim Wilkison	7–6, 7–6

=== Doubles ===
Year	Champions	Runners-up	Score
1973	(Australia) Roy Emerson (Australia) Rod Laver	(South Africa) Robert Maud (Rhodesia) Andrew Pattison	7–6, 6–3
1974	(United States) Robert Lutz (United States) Stan Smith	(United States) Brian Gottfried (United States) Dick Stockton	6–3, 3–6, 7–6
1975	(India) Anand Amritraj (India) Vijay Amritraj	(United Kingdom) Mark Cox (South Africa) Cliff Drysdale	6–3, 6–2
1976	(Australia) John Alexander (Australia) Phil Dent	(Poland) Wojciech Fibak (Germany) Karl Meiler	6–3, 6–4

== Event Names ==
Official

- Atlanta Tennis Classic (1970-1976)
- Atlanta Open (1978-1981)
- WCT Atlanta Championships (1985-1986)

Tour

- WCT Atlanta (1970-1976)

Sponsored

- Peachtree Corners Classic (1973-1974)
- First National Bank Classic (Atlanta) (1975)
- Phoenix Cup (1976)
- Atlanta Journal Constitution Open (1978-1980)
- Atlanta Journal-Constitution Championships (1981)

== See also ==
- Atlanta Open - men's tournament (since 2010)
- WTA Atlanta – women's tournament (1975–1983)
